= 2003 LSU Tigers football team =

American college football season

2003 LSU Tigers football

Coaches' Poll (BCS) national champion NFF national champion SEC champion SEC Western Division co-champion Sugar Bowl champion

SEC Championship Game, W 34–13 vs. Georgia

Sugar Bowl (BCS NCG), W 21–14 vs. Oklahoma
- Conference: Southeastern Conference
- Western Division

Ranking
- Coaches: No. 1
- AP: No. 2
- Record: 13–1 (7–1 SEC)
- Head coach: Nick Saban (4th season)
- Offensive coordinator: Jimbo Fisher (4th season)
- Offensive scheme: Pro-style
- Defensive coordinator: Will Muschamp (2nd season)
- Base defense: 4–3
- Home stadium: Tiger Stadium

2003 Southeastern Conference football standings
	Conf.			Overall
Team	W		L	W		L
Eastern Division
No. 7 Georgia xy	6	–	2	11	–	3
No. 15 Tennessee x	6	–	2	10	–	3
No. 24 Florida x	6	–	2	8	–	5
South Carolina	2	–	6	5	–	7
Vanderbilt	1	–	7	2	–	10
Kentucky	1	–	7	4	–	8
Western Division
No. 2 LSU xy$#	7	–	1	13	–	1
No. 13 Ole Miss x	7	–	1	10	–	3
Auburn	5	–	3	8	–	5
Arkansas	4	–	4	9	–	4
Alabama	2	–	6	4	–	9
Mississippi State	1	–	7	2	–	10
Championship: LSU 34, Georgia 13
# – BCS National Champion; $ – BCS representative as conference champion; x – Division champion/co-champions; y – Championship game participant; Rankings from AP Poll

The 2003 LSU Tigers football team represented Louisiana State University (LSU) during the 2003 NCAA Division I-A football season. Led by fourth-year head coach Nick Saban, the LSU Tigers played their home games at Tiger Stadium in Baton Rouge, Louisiana.

The Tigers compiled an 11–1 regular season record, going 7–1 in SEC play to finish tied for first in the SEC West, with the lone loss coming against SEC East foe Florida. Due to defeating the other co-division champion, Ole Miss, LSU was selected to play in the SEC Championship Game, defeating no. 5 Georgia 34–13. LSU was selected to play the Oklahoma Sooners in the Sugar Bowl for the Bowl Championship Series (BCS) national title. LSU won the BCS National Championship Game, the first national football championship for LSU since 1958.

The 2003 college football regular season ended with three one-loss teams in BCS contention: the LSU Tigers, Oklahoma Sooners, and USC Trojans. USC ended the regular season ranked No. 1 and LSU No. 2 in both the AP Poll and the Coaches' Poll. Media controversy ensued when the BCS computer-based selection system chose LSU and Oklahoma as the participants in the BCS title game, largely based on an assessment of the relative difficulty of the three teams' 2003 schedules. During the bowl games, LSU beat No. 3 Oklahoma 21–14 in the Sugar Bowl (designated as the BCS National Championship Game for the 2003–04 season), while USC defeated the No. 4 Michigan Wolverines 28–14 in the Rose Bowl. LSU was ranked No. 1 in the final Coaches' Poll (which was contractually obligated to rank the BCS champion No. 1) while USC remained No. 1 in the final AP Poll, resulting in a non-consensus national title - the last time this has happened. Several experts have viewed the 2003 Tigers as having one of the greatest defenses in college football history.

== Schedule ==
Date	Time	Opponent	Rank	Site	TV	Result	Attendance
August 30	7:00 p.m.	Louisiana–Monroe*	No. 14	Tiger Stadium; Baton Rouge, LA		W 49–7	89,148
September 6	9:00 p.m.	at Arizona*	No. 13	Arizona Stadium; Tucson, AZ	TBS	W 59–13	46,110
September 13	7:00 p.m.	No. 1 (I-AA) Western Illinois*	No. 12	Tiger Stadium; Baton Rouge, LA		W 35–7	87,164
September 20	2:30 p.m.	No. 7 Georgia	No. 11	Tiger Stadium; Baton Rouge, LA (College GameDay)	CBS	W 17–10	92,251
September 27	8:00 p.m.	at Mississippi State	No. 7	Davis Wade Stadium; Starkville, MS (rivalry)	ESPN2	W 41–6	45,835
October 11	2:30 p.m.	Florida	No. 6	Tiger Stadium; Baton Rouge, LA (rivalry)	CBS	L 7–19	92,077
October 18	6:45 p.m.	at South Carolina	No. 10	Williams–Brice Stadium; Columbia, SC	ESPN2	W 33–7	82,525
October 25	7:00 p.m.	No. 17 Auburn	No. 9	Tiger Stadium; Baton Rouge, LA (Tiger Bowl)	ESPN	W 31–7	92,085
November 1	7:00 p.m.	Louisiana Tech*^{†}	No. 7	Tiger Stadium; Baton Rouge, LA	PPV	W 49–10	91,879
November 15	6:45 p.m.	at Alabama	No. 3	Bryant–Denny Stadium; Tuscaloosa, AL (rivalry)	ESPN	W 27–3	83,818
November 22	2:30 p.m.	at No. 15 Ole Miss	No. 3	Vaught–Hemingway Stadium; Oxford, MS (Magnolia Bowl)	CBS	W 17–14	62,552
November 28	1:30 p.m.	Arkansas	No. 3	Tiger Stadium; Baton Rouge, LA (rivalry)	CBS	W 55–24	92,213
December 6	8:00 p.m.	vs. No. 5 Georgia	No. 3	Georgia Dome; Atlanta, GA (SEC Championship Game / College GameDay)	CBS	W 34–13	74,913
January 4, 2004	7:15 p.m.	vs. No. 3 Oklahoma*	No. 2	Louisiana Superdome; New Orleans, LA (Sugar Bowl / College GameDay)	ABC	W 21–14	79,342
*Non-conference game; ^{†}Homecoming; Rankings from AP Poll released prior to the game; All times are in Central time

== Rankings ==
Ranking movements Legend: ██ Increase in ranking ██ Decrease in ranking ( ) = First-place votes
	Week																
Poll	Pre	1	2	3	4	5	6	7	8	9	10	11	12	13	14	15	Final
AP	14	13	12	11	7	6	6	10	9	7	4	3	3	3	3	2 (21)	2 (17)
Coaches	15	13	11	10	7	6	6	10	9	8	4	3	3	3	3	2 (18)	1 (60)
BCS	Not released								12	7	7	4	4	3	3	2	Not released

== Roster ==
Quarterbacks: 12 Marcus Randall; 15 Matt Flynn; 18 Matt Mauck; 4 JaMarcus Russell; 8 Ty Barrett; 19 Michael Harrison; Running backs: 22 Torey Bennett; 2 Shyrone Carey; 23 Jason Spadoni; 25 Justin Vincent; 10 Joseph Addai; 32 Barrington Edwards; 22 Alley Broussard; Fullbacks: 24 Tyler Olivier; 49 Michael Ricks; 35 Brandon Nowlin; 40 Shawn Jordan; 44 Kevin Steltz; 11 Jason Lile; Wide receivers: 86 Junior Joseph; 13 Steve Mares; 14 Michael Clayton; 9 Devery Henderson; 87 Blain Bech; 4 Michael Russo; 81 Dwayne Bowe; 85 Craig Davis; 17 Bennie Brazell; 38 Gino Giambelluca; 8 Terrell Clayton; 80 Schirra Fields; 5 Skyler Green; 42 Andre Gill; 1 Amp Hill	Tight ends: 47 Eric Edwards; 82 David Jones; 84 Andrew Wright; 83 Kory Hebert; 88 Demetri Robinson; 89 Keith Zinger; Center: 59 Doug Planchard; 55 Ben Wilkerson; 61 Jimmy Courtenay; Offensive line: 65 Steve Arflin; 62 Brandon Hurley; 69 Garett Wibel; 75 Brian Johnson; 71 Nate Livings; 68 Terrell McGill; 72 Stephen Peterman; 67 Bradley Sowa; 74 Josh Dicharry; 64 Rudy Niswanger; 62 Harold Bicknell; 73 Will Arnold; 66 Jerry Sevin; 76 Andrew Whitworth; 63 Mac McLachlan; 60 Rodney Reed; 78 Paris Hodges; 77 Peter Dyakowski; Defensive line: 59 Leo Desselle; Defensive end: 79 Sean Merrill; 84 Marcus Spears; 52 Ryan Willis; 96 Carnell Stewart; 97 Brandon Washington; 94 Marquise Hill; 48 Kirston Pittman; 53 Tory Collins	Defensive tackle: 98 Torran Williams; 92 Bryce Wyatt; 50 Jarrod Carter; 89 Timothy Binion; 90 Melvin Oliver; 95 Kyle Williams; 93 Chad Lavalais; Linebackers: 99 Jason LeDoux; 45 Willie Demps; 35 Mark Martin; 19 Darius Ingram; 63 Patrick McGibboney; 57 Dave Peterson; 34 Dorsett Buckels; 27 Eric Alexander; 40 Barrett Dupuy; 52 Joey Noto; 47 Dustin Adams; 35 Micah Metrailer; 91 Alonzo Manuel; 56 Kenneth Hollis; 42 Phillip Maxwell; 46 Cameron Vaughn; 58 Lionel Turner; 51 Dominic Cooper; 54 Brian West; 55 Chris McCauley; 7 Adrian Mayes; Defensive backs: 37 Daniel Francis; 38 Vernon Russell, Jr.; 6 Ryan Gilbert; 28 Jeff Cook; 39 Troy Hankton; 9 Corey Meredith; 28 Greg Hercules; 44 Patrick Babinecz; 30 LaRon Landry; 33 Jonathan Zenon; 26 Nick Child; 31 Jessie Daniels; 41 Marcques Lewis	Cornerbacks: 13 Corey Webster; 24 Keron Gordon; 29 Travis Daniels; 1 Ronnie Prude; 21 Randall Gay; Safeties: 8 Jack Hunt; 43 Chad White; Punters: 16 Ross Cockrell; 80 Donnie Jones; 36 Patrick Fisher; Kickers: 35 Andre Boagni; 6 Colt David; 41 Chris Jackson; 39 Ryan Gaudet; Long snappers: 86 Steve Damen; 70 Gant Petty

== Game summaries ==
=== Louisiana–Monroe ===
Team	1	2	3	4	Total
Indians	0	0	0	7	7
• No. 14 Tigers	0	21	21	7	49

- Date: August 30
- Location: Tiger Stadium, Baton Rouge, Louisiana
- Game start: 7:00 p.m. CDT

Statistics	ULM	LSU
First downs	11	23
Total yards	240	474
Rushing yards	59	168
Passing yards	181	306
Turnovers	2	1
Time of possession	24:45	35:15

Team	Category	Player	Statistics
Louisiana–Monroe	Passing	Steven Jyles	14/30, 180 yards, INT
Louisiana–Monroe	Rushing	Kevin Payne	16 rushes, 64 yards, TD
Louisiana–Monroe	Receiving	Mack Vincent	2 receptions, 46 yards
LSU	Passing	Matt Mauck	13/28, 153 yards, 3 TD, INT
LSU	Rushing	Joseph Addai	15 rushes, 81 yards
LSU	Receiving	Michael Clayton	6 receptions, 152 yards, 2 TD

=== At Arizona ===
Team	1	2	3	4	Total
• No. 13 Tigers	17	21	7	14	59
Wildcats	0	0	0	13	13

- Date: September 6
- Location: Arizona Stadium, Tucson, Arizona
- Game start: 7:00 p.m. MST
- Television network: TBS

Statistics	LSU	ARIZ
First downs	28	10
Total yards	481	182
Rushing yards	182	91
Passing yards	299	91
Turnovers	4	3
Time of possession	36:13	23:47

Team	Category	Player	Statistics
LSU	Passing	Matt Mauck	10/11, 150 yards, TD
LSU	Rushing	Joseph Addai	18 rushes, 86 yards, 2 TD
LSU	Receiving	Michael Clayton	6 receptions, 109 yards, TD
Arizona	Passing	Ryan O'Hara	7/20, 70 yards, INT
Arizona	Rushing	Clarence Farmer	8 rushes, 61 yards, TD
Arizona	Receiving	Sean Jones	3 receptions, 27 yards

=== No. 1 (I-AA) Western Illinois ===
Team	1	2	3	4	Total
No. 1 (I-AA) Leathernecks	0	0	7	0	7
• No. 12 Tigers	6	7	15	7	35

- Date: September 13
- Location: Tiger Stadium, Baton Rouge, Louisiana
- Game start: 7:00 p.m. CST
- Game attendance: 87,164
- Game weather: 79 deg F, Wind E 5–10, 74% humidity

Scoring summary
Q1	08:18	LSU	Michael Clayton 10 yd pass from Matt Mauck (Ryan Gaudet kick failed)	LSU 6–0
Q2	0:42	LSU	Shyrone Carey 1 yd run (Chris Jackson kick)	LSU 13–0
Q3	10:08	WIU	Terrence Hall 3 yd pass from Russ Michna (Justin Langan kick)	LSU 13-7
Q3	5:00	LSU	Skyler Green 8 yd pass from Matt Mauck (Matt Mauck rush)	LSU 21–7
Q3	2:26	LSU	Skyler Green 40 yd pass from Matt Mauck (Chris Jackson kick)	LSU 28-7
Q4	8:29	AUB	D. Henderson 16 yd pass from Matt Mauck (Chris Jackson kick)	LSU 35–7

Statistics	WIU	LSU
First downs	12	31
Total yards	208	457
Rushing yards	13	152
Passing yards	195	305
Turnovers	3	3
Time of possession	27:59	32:01

Team	Category	Player	Statistics
Western Illinois	Passing	Russ Michna	17/39, 195 yards, TD, 3 INT
Western Illinois	Rushing	Travis Glasford	16 rushes, 21 yards
Western Illinois	Receiving	Travis Glasford	4 receptions, 43 yards
LSU	Passing	Matt Mauck	23/32, 305 yards, 4 TD
LSU	Rushing	Shyrone Carey	21 rushes, 124 yards, TD
LSU	Receiving	Michael Clayton	11 receptions, 162 yards, TD

=== No. 7 Georgia ===
Team	1	2	3	4	Total
No. 7 Bulldogs	3	0	0	7	10
• No. 11 Tigers	0	7	3	7	17

- Date: September 20
- Location: Tiger Stadium, Baton Rouge, Louisiana
- Game start: 2:30 p.m. CDT
- TV announcers (CBS): Verne Lundquist, Todd Blackledge and Jill Arrington

Scoring summary
Q1	6:20	UGA	Billy Bennett 33 yard field goal	UGA 3–0
Q2	3:10	LSU	Shyrone Carey 21 yard run (Ryan Gaudet kick)	LSU 7–3
Q3	6:23	LSU	Ryan Gaudet 47 yard field goal	LSU 10–3
Q4	4:25	UGA	Tyson Browning 93 yard pass from David Greene (Billy Bennett kick)	Tie 10–10
Q4	1:22	LSU	Skyler Green 34 yard pass from Matt Mauck (Ryan Gaudet kick)	LSU 17–10

Statistics	UGA	LSU
First downs	23	16
Total yards	411	285
Rushing yards	97	105
Passing yards	314	180
Turnovers	3	2
Time of possession	26:43	33:17

Team	Category	Player	Statistics
Georgia	Passing	David Greene	20/44, 314 yards, TD, 2 INT
Georgia	Rushing	Michael Cooper	18 rushes, 73 yards
Georgia	Receiving	Tyson Browning	2 receptions, 104 yards, TD
LSU	Passing	Matt Mauck	14/29, 180 yards, TD, INT
LSU	Rushing	Shyrone Carey	18 rushes, 73 yards, TD
LSU	Receiving	Skyler Green	4 receptions, 78 yards, TD

=== At Mississippi State ===
Team	1	2	3	4	Total
• No. 7 Tigers	7	17	10	7	41
Bulldogs	0	0	0	6	6

- Date: September 27
- Location: Davis Wade Stadium, Starkville, Mississippi
- Game start: 8:00 p.m. CST

Statistics	LSU	MSST
First downs	17	18
Total yards	354	239
Rushing yards	163	31
Passing yards	191	208
Turnovers	2	4
Time of possession	27:06	32:54

Team	Category	Player	Statistics
LSU	Passing	Matt Mauck	12/19, 171 yards, TD, INT
LSU	Rushing	Justin Vincent	6 rushes, 58 yards, TD
LSU	Receiving	Devery Henderson	7 receptions, 114 yards, TD
Mississippi State	Passing	Kevin Fant	19/30, 191 yards, TD, 2 INT
Mississippi State	Rushing	Fred Reid	6 rushes, 29 yards
Mississippi State	Receiving	Justin Jenkins	5 receptions, 61 yards, TD

=== Florida ===
Team	1	2	3	4	Total
• Gators	10	3	6	0	19
No. 6 Tigers	7	0	0	0	7

- Date: October 11
- Location: Tiger Stadium, Baton Rouge, Louisiana
- Game start: 2:30 p.m. CDT
- Game attendance: 92,077
- Game weather: Cloudy, 76 °F (24 °C)
- Referee: Terry Brown
- TV announcers (CBS): Verne Lundquist, Todd Blackledge, and Jill Arrington

Scoring summary
1	11:51	LSU	Skyler Green 80-yard punt return (Ryan Gaudet kick)	LSU 7–0
1	6:51	FLA	Ran Carthon 22-yard pass from Chris Leak (Matt Leach kick)	Tied 7–7 (Drive: 13 plays, 80 yards, 5:00)
1	3:17	FLA	Matt Leach 29-yard field goal	FLA 10–7 (Drive: 6 plays, 18 yards, 1:43)
2	5:37	FLA	Matt Leach 50-yard field goal	FLA 13–7 (Drive: 6 plays, 32 yards, 1:58)
3	5:21	FLA	Ciatrick Fason 35-yard pass from Chris Leak (pass failed)	FLA 19–7 (Drive: 6 plays, 48 yards, 1:58)

Statistics	FLA	LSU
First downs	18	14
Total yards	310	287
Rushing yards	81	56
Passing yards	229	231
Turnovers	1	3
Time of possession	30:20	29:40

Team	Category	Player	Statistics
Florida	Passing	Chris Leak	18/30, 229 yards, 2 TD
Florida	Rushing	Ciatrick Fason	7 rushes, 92 yards
Florida	Receiving	Carlos Perez	3 receptions, 58 yards
LSU	Passing	Matt Mauck	19/33, 231 yards, 2 INT
LSU	Rushing	Joseph Addai	10 rushes, 39 yards
LSU	Receiving	Devery Henderson	5 receptions, 109 yards

=== At South Carolina ===
Team	1	2	3	4	Total
• No. 10 Tigers	6	13	7	7	33
Gamecocks	0	0	7	0	7

- Date: October 18
- Location: Williams–Brice Stadium, Columbia, South Carolina
- Game start: 7:45 p.m. EDT

Statistics	LSU	SCAR
First downs	27	11
Total yards	482	254
Rushing yards	263	0
Passing yards	219	254
Turnovers	1	1
Time of possession	41:43	18:17

Team	Category	Player	Statistics
LSU	Passing	Matt Mauck	24/30, 199 yards, 2 TD, INT
LSU	Rushing	Alley Broussard	19 rushes, 108 yards
LSU	Receiving	Justin Vincent	4 receptions, 46 yards
South Carolina	Passing	Dondrial Pinkins	15/32, 254 yards, TD
South Carolina	Rushing	Demetris Summers	8 rushes, 16 yards
South Carolina	Receiving	Matthew Thomas	4 receptions, 102 yards, TD

=== No. 17 Auburn ===
Team	1	2	3	4	Total
No. 17 Auburn	0	0	0	7	7
• No. 9 LSU	21	0	10	0	31

- Date: October 25
- Location: Tiger Stadium, Baton Rouge, Louisiana
- Game start: 7:00 p.m. CDT

Scoring summary
Q1	13:01	LSU	Devery Henderson 64 yard pass from Matt Mauck (Ryan Gaudet kick)	LSU 7–0
Q1	7:43	LSU	Michael Clayton 18 yard pass from Matt Mauck (Ryan Gaudet kick)	LSU 14–0
Q1	2:58	LSU	Alley Broussard 5 yard run (Ryan Gaudet kick)	LSU 21–0
Q3	8:28	LSU	Ryan Gaudet 33 yard field goal	LSU 24–0
Q3	3:46	LSU	Devery Henderson 16 yard pass from Matt Mauck (Ryan Gaudet kick)	LSU 31–0
Q4	6:10	AUB	Anthony Mix 6 yard pass from Jason Campbell (Philip Yost kick)	LSU 31–7

Statistics	AUB	LSU
First downs		
Total yards		
Rushing yards		
Passing yards		
Turnovers		
Time of possession		

Team	Category	Player	Statistics
Auburn	Passing		
Auburn	Rushing		
Auburn	Receiving		
LSU	Passing		
LSU	Rushing		
LSU	Receiving		

=== Louisiana Tech ===
Team	1	2	3	4	Total
Bulldogs	0	3	7	0	10
• No. 7 Tigers	28	21	0	0	49

- Date: November 1
- Location: Tiger Stadium, Baton Rouge, Louisiana
- Game start: 7:00 p.m. EST

Statistics	LT	LSU
First downs		
Total yards		
Rushing yards		
Passing yards		
Turnovers		
Time of possession		

Team	Category	Player	Statistics
Louisiana Tech	Passing		
Louisiana Tech	Rushing		
Louisiana Tech	Receiving		
LSU	Passing		
LSU	Rushing		
LSU	Receiving		

=== At Alabama ===
Team	1	2	3	4	Total
• No. 3 Tigers	10	7	7	3	27
Crimson Tide	0	0	0	3	3

- Date: November 15
- Location: Bryant–Denny Stadium, Tuscaloosa, Alabama
- Game start: 6:45 p.m. CST

Scoring summary
Q1	10:34	LSU	Chris Jackson 20 yard field goal	LSU 3–0
Q1	9:16	LSU	Michael Clayton 23 yard pass from Matt Mauck (Chris Jackson kick)	LSU 10–0
Q2	2:03	LSU	Eric Edwards 3 yard pass from Matt Mauck (Chris Jackson kick)	LSU 17–0
Q3	9:15	LSU	Alley Broussard 4 yard run (Chris Jackson kick)	LSU 24–0
Q4	10:11	LSU	Chris Jackson 33 yard field goal	LSU 27–0
Q4	6:39	ALA	Brian Bostick 27 yard field goal	LSU 27–3

Statistics	LSU	ALA
First downs		
Total yards		
Rushing yards		
Passing yards		
Turnovers		
Time of possession		

Team	Category	Player	Statistics
LSU	Passing		
LSU	Rushing		
LSU	Receiving		
Alabama	Passing		
Alabama	Rushing		
Alabama	Receiving		

=== At No. 15 Ole Miss ===
Team	1	2	3	4	Total
• No. 3 Tigers	3	7	0	7	17
No. 15 Rebels	7	0	0	7	14

- Date: November 22
- Location: Vaught–Hemingway Stadium, Oxford, Mississippi
- Game start: 2:30 p.m. CST
- TV announcers (CBS): Verne Lundquist, Todd Blackledge and Jill Arrington

Scoring summary
Q1	13:54	MISS	Travis Johnson 6 yard interception return (Jonathan Nichols kick)	MISS 7–0
Q1	6:44	LSU	Chris Jackson 45 yard field goal	MISS 7–3
Q2	2:42	LSU	Michael Clayton 9 yard pass from Matt Mauck (Chris Jackson kick)	LSU 10–7
Q4	14:50	LSU	Devery Henderson 53 yard pass from Matt Mauck (Chris Jackson kick)	LSU 17–7
Q4	10:51	MISS	Brandon Jacobs 10 yard pass from Eli Manning (Jonathan Nichols kick)	LSU 17–14

Statistics	LSU	MISS
First downs		
Total yards		
Rushing yards		
Passing yards		
Turnovers		
Time of possession		

Team	Category	Player	Statistics
LSU	Passing		
LSU	Rushing		
LSU	Receiving		
Ole Miss	Passing		
Ole Miss	Rushing		
Ole Miss	Receiving		

=== Arkansas ===
Team	1	2	3	4	Total
Razorbacks	10	7	0	7	24
• No. 3 Tigers	10	24	21	0	55

- Date: November 28
- Location: Tiger Stadium, Baton Rouge, Louisiana
- Game start: 1:30 p.m. CST

Statistics	ARK	LSU
First downs		
Total yards		
Rushing yards		
Passing yards		
Turnovers		
Time of possession		

Team	Category	Player	Statistics
Arkansas	Passing		
Arkansas	Rushing		
Arkansas	Receiving		
LSU	Passing		
LSU	Rushing		
LSU	Receiving		

=== Vs. No. 5 Georgia (SEC Championship Game) ===
Team	1	2	3	4	Total
• No. 3 Tigers	8	9	7	10	34
No. 5 Bulldogs	0	3	10	0	13

- Date: December 6
- Location: Georgia Dome, Atlanta
- Game start: 8:00 p.m. EST
- Game weather: Indoors
- TV announcers (CBS): Verne Lundquist, Todd Blackledge and Jill Arrington

Statistics	LSU	UGA
First downs		
Total yards		
Rushing yards		
Passing yards		
Turnovers		
Time of possession		

Team	Category	Player	Statistics
LSU	Passing		
LSU	Rushing		
LSU	Receiving		
Arizona	Passing		
Arizona	Rushing		
Arizona	Receiving		

=== Vs. No. 3 Oklahoma (Sugar Bowl – BCS NCG) ===
Team	1	2	3	4	Total
No. 3 Sooners	0	7	0	7	14
• No. 2 Tigers	7	7	7	0	21

- Date: January 4
- Location: Louisiana Superdome, New Orleans, Louisiana
- Game start: 7:00 p.m. CST
- Game attendance: 79,342
- Game weather: Indoors
- Referee: Dennis Hennigan
- TV announcers (ABC): Brent Musburger and Gary Danielson

Scoring summary
Q1	11:38	LSU	Skyler Green 24 yard run (Ryan Gaudet kick)	LSU 7–0
Q2	7:31	OKLA	Kejuan Jones 1 yard run (Trey DiCarlo kick)	Tie 7–7
Q2	4:21	LSU	Justin Vincent 18 yard run (Ryan Gaudet kick)	LSU 14–7
Q3	14:13	LSU	Marcus Spears 20 yard interception return (Ryan Gaudet kick)	LSU 21–7
Q4	11:01	OKLA	Kejuan Jones 1 yard run (Trey DiCarlo kick)	LSU 21–14

Statistics	OKLA	LSU
First downs		
Total yards		
Rushing yards		
Passing yards		
Turnovers		
Time of possession		

Team	Category	Player	Statistics
Oklahoma	Passing		
Oklahoma	Rushing		
Oklahoma	Receiving		
LSU	Passing		
LSU	Rushing		
LSU	Receiving		

== LSU Tigers in the 2004 NFL draft ==
Player	Position	Round	Pick	Overall	NFL team
Michael Clayton	Wide receiver	1	15	15	Tampa Bay Buccaneers
Devery Henderson	Wide receiver	2	18	50	New Orleans Saints
Marquise Hill	Defensive end	2	31	63	New England Patriots
Stephen Peterman	Offensive Guard	3	20	83	Dallas Cowboys
Chad Lavalais	Defensive tackle	5	10	142	Atlanta Falcons
Donnie Jones	Punter	7	23	224	Seattle Seahawks
Matt Mauck	Quarterback	7	24	225	Denver Broncos
