= 2003 Vanderbilt Commodores football team =

American college football season

2003 Vanderbilt Commodores football
- Conference: Southeastern Conference
- Eastern Division
- Record: 2–10 (1–7 SEC)
- Head coach: Bobby Johnson (2nd season)
- Offensive coordinator: Ted Cain (2nd season)
- Offensive scheme: Multiple
- Defensive coordinator: Bruce Fowler (2nd season)
- Base defense: 4–3
- Captains: Jay Cutler; Justin Geisinger; Jovan Haye
- Home stadium: Vanderbilt Stadium

2003 Southeastern Conference football standings
	Conf.			Overall
Team	W		L	W		L
Eastern Division
No. 7 Georgia xy	6	–	2	11	–	3
No. 15 Tennessee x	6	–	2	10	–	3
No. 24 Florida x	6	–	2	8	–	5
South Carolina	2	–	6	5	–	7
Vanderbilt	1	–	7	2	–	10
Kentucky	1	–	7	4	–	8
Western Division
No. 2 LSU xy$#	7	–	1	13	–	1
No. 13 Ole Miss x	7	–	1	10	–	3
Auburn	5	–	3	8	–	5
Arkansas	4	–	4	9	–	4
Alabama	2	–	6	4	–	9
Mississippi State	1	–	7	2	–	10
Championship: LSU 34, Georgia 13
# – BCS National Champion; $ – BCS representative as conference champion; x – Division champion/co-champions; y – Championship game participant; Rankings from AP Poll

The 2003 Vanderbilt Commodores football team represented Vanderbilt University as a member of the Eastern Division of the Southeastern Conference (SEC) during the 2003 NCAA Division I-A football season. Led by second-year head coach Bobby Johnson, the Commodores compiled an overall record of 2–10 with a mark of 1–7 in conference play, tying for fifth place at the bottom the SEC's Eastern Division standings. The team played home games at Vanderbilt Stadium in Nashville, Tennessee.

The 2003 season was Vanderbilt's 21st consecutive losing campaign, but the Commodores ended their 23-game consecutive losing streak to SEC teams with a win over Kentucky in the second to last game of the year.

== Schedule ==
Date	Time	Opponent	Site	TV	Result	Attendance	Source
August 30	11:30 a.m.	Ole Miss	Vanderbilt Stadium; Nashville, TN (rivalry)	JPS	L 21–24	29,411	
September 6	6:00 p.m.	Chattanooga*	Vanderbilt Stadium; Nashville, TN		W 51–6	26,176	
September 13	11:30 a.m.	Auburn	Vanderbilt Stadium; Nashville, TN	JPS	L 7–45	37,703	
September 20	6:00 p.m.	at No. 20 TCU*	Amon G. Carter Stadium; Fort Worth, TX		L 14–30	37,192	
September 27	6:00 p.m.	Georgia Tech*	Vanderbilt Stadium; Nashville, TN (rivalry)	PPV	L 17–24 ^{OT}	25,007	
October 4	1:30 p.m.	at Mississippi State	Davis Wade Stadium; Starkville, MS		L 21–30	40,156	
October 11	1:00 p.m.	Navy*^{†}	Vanderbilt Stadium; Nashville, TN		L 27–37	25,417	
October 18	1:00 p.m.	No. 4 Georgia	Vanderbilt Stadium; Nashville, TN (rivalry)	PPV	L 8–27	27,823	
October 25	6:00 p.m.	at South Carolina	Williams–Brice Stadium; Columbia, SC	PPV	L 24–35	77,227	
November 8	12:00 p.m.	at No. 17 Florida	Ben Hill Griffin Stadium; Gainesville, FL	PPV	L 17–35	90,122	
November 15	1:00 p.m.	Kentucky	Vanderbilt Stadium; Nashville, TN (rivalry)		W 28–17	26,440	
November 22	12:00 p.m.	at No. 9 Tennessee	Neyland Stadium; Knoxville, TN (rivalry)	PPV	L 0–48	105,462	
*Non-conference game; ^{†}Homecoming; Rankings from AP Poll released prior to the game; All times are in Central time

== Roster ==
2003 Vanderbilt Commodores football team roster
Players
Coaches
Offense

Pos.	#	Name	Class
QB	6	Jay Cutler	So

Defense

Pos.	#	Name	Class
DE	91	Jovan Haye	So
DT	95	Ralph McKenzie	So
DE	96	Robert Dinwiddie	Jr
DE	97	Antron Dillon	Fr

Special teams

Pos.	#	Name	Class

Head coach

- Bobby Johnson

Coordinators/assistant coaches

Legend

- (C) Team captain
- (S) Suspended
- (I) Ineligible
- Injured
- Redshirt

Roster
Last update: 2003-12-22

== Team players drafted into the NFL ==
No players from the 2003 Vanderbilt team were drafted.
