= 2004 Cotton Bowl Classic =

2004 SBC Cotton Bowl Classic
- 68th Cotton Bowl Classic
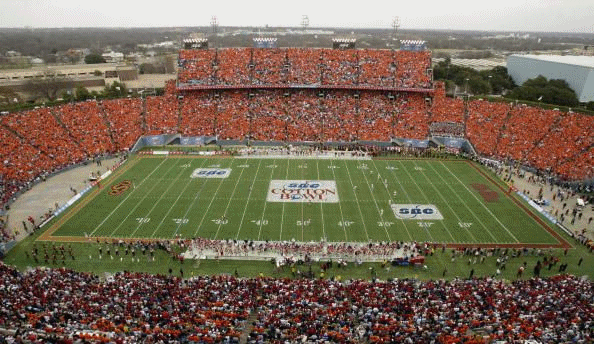
- The Cotton Bowl during the Cotton Bowl Classic between the Oklahoma State Cowboys and the Ole Miss Rebels.
Oklahoma State Cowboys	Ole Miss Rebels
(9–3)	(9–3)
Big 12	SEC
28	31
Head coach: Les Miles	Head coach: David Cutcliffe
AP / Coaches / BCS; 21 / 22 / 21	AP / Coaches / BCS; 16 / 18 / 19
	1	2	3	4	Total
Oklahoma State	7	7	0	14	28
Ole Miss	7	10	7	7	31
- Date: January 2, 2004
- Season: 2003
- Stadium: Cotton Bowl
- Location: Dallas, Texas
- MVP: QB Eli Manning (Ole Miss); DE Josh Cooper (Ole Miss)
- Referee: Bill LeMonnier (Big Ten)
- Attendance: 73,928

United States TV coverage
- Network: Fox
- Announcers: Thom Brennaman, Tim Green and Bill Maas

The 2004 Cotton Bowl Classic was a post-season college football bowl game between the Oklahoma State Cowboys and the Ole Miss Rebels on January 2, 2004, at the Cotton Bowl in Dallas, Texas. It was the final game of the 2003 NCAA Division I-A football season for each team and resulted in a 31–28 Ole Miss victory. Ole Miss represented the Southeastern Conference (SEC) while Oklahoma State represented the Big 12 Conference. It was Ole Miss's first January bowl victory since the 1970 Sugar Bowl and first Cotton Bowl Classic appearance since 1962.

== Game summary ==
Ole Miss quarterback Eli Manning completed 21 of 33 pass attempts, threw for two touchdowns, and he ran for one additional touchdown to lead the Rebels to a Cotton Bowl Classic win in a game that was not decided until the final minutes as the Rebels built a 31–14 lead, then held on after the Cowboys made it 31–28 with 4:38 to go. Vernand Morency had two touchdowns for OSU.
