= 2003 SEC Championship Game =

- Conference Championship
- 2003 SEC Championship logo
Georgia Bulldogs	LSU Tigers
(10–2)	(11–1)
13	34
Head coach: Mark Richt	Head coach: Nick Saban
AP / Coaches / BCS; 5 / 5 / 7	AP / Coaches / BCS; 3 / 3 / 3
	1	2	3	4	Total
Georgia	0	3	10	0	13
LSU	8	9	7	10	34
- Date: December 6, 2003
- Season: 2003
- Stadium: Georgia Dome
- Location: Atlanta, Georgia
- MVP: RB Justin Vincent, LSU
- Favorite: LSU by 3
- National anthem: Georgia Redcoat Marching Band; Tiger Marching Band
- Referee: Tom Ritter
- Halftime show: Georgia Redcoat Marching Band; Tiger Marching Band
- Attendance: 74,913

United States TV coverage
- Network: CBS
- Announcers: Verne Lundquist (play-by-play); Todd Blackledge (color); Jill Arrington (sideline)

2003 Southeastern Conference football standings
	Conf.			Overall
Team	W		L	W		L
Eastern Division
No. 7 Georgia xy	6	–	2	11	–	3
No. 15 Tennessee x	6	–	2	10	–	3
No. 24 Florida x	6	–	2	8	–	5
South Carolina	2	–	6	5	–	7
Vanderbilt	1	–	7	2	–	10
Kentucky	1	–	7	4	–	8
Western Division
No. 2 LSU xy$#	7	–	1	13	–	1
No. 13 Ole Miss x	7	–	1	10	–	3
Auburn	5	–	3	8	–	5
Arkansas	4	–	4	9	–	4
Alabama	2	–	6	4	–	9
Mississippi State	1	–	7	2	–	10
Championship: LSU 34, Georgia 13
# – BCS National Champion; $ – BCS representative as conference champion; x – Division champion/co-champions; y – Championship game participant; Rankings from AP Poll

The 2003 SEC Championship Game was won by the LSU Tigers 34–13 over the Georgia Bulldogs. The game was played in the Georgia Dome in Atlanta.
