= Eric Wilbur =

American football player (born 1984)

No. 11, 15
- Position: Punter / Placekicker

Personal information
- Born: December 12, 1984 (age 41); Winter Park, Florida, U.S.
- Listed height: 6 ft 2 in (1.88 m)
- Listed weight: 200 lb (91 kg)

Career information
- High school: Trinity Prep (Winter Park)
- College: Florida
- NFL draft: 2007: undrafted

Career history
- Houston Texans (2007)*; Jacksonville Jaguars (2007)*; New York Jets (2009)*; Hamilton Tiger-Cats (2010); Omaha Nighthawks (2011); Edmonton Eskimos (2012)*; Winnipeg Blue Bombers (2012)*; Toronto Argonauts (2012)
- * Offseason or practice squad member only

Awards and highlights
- BCS national champion (2007); Second-team All-SEC (2003)

Career CFL statistics
- Punts: 88
- Punting yards: 3,781
- Average punt: 43
- Singles: 5
- Stats at CFL.ca (archive)

Eric Wilbur (born December 12, 1984) is an American former professional football player who was a punter for two seasons in the Canadian Football League (CFL). Wilbur played college football for the Florida Gators. He was signed by the Houston Texans of the National Football League (NFL) as an undrafted free agent in 2007, and has also played for the Hamilton Tiger-Cats and the Toronto Argonauts of the CFL.

== Early life ==
Wilbur was born in Winter Park, Florida. He attended Trinity Preparatory School in Winter Park, and played high school football for the Trinity Prep Saints. At Trinity, he played receiver, defensive back, returner, and kicker. He was selected as the number one kicker in the state of Florida and was ranked as the number seven prospect by SuperPrep. Following his senior season, he was chosen as first-team all-state kicker and was picked to play in the U. S. Army All-American Bowl.

== College career ==
Wilbur accepted an athletic scholarship to attend the University of Florida in Gainesville, Florida, where he played for coach Ron Zook and coach Urban Meyer's Gators teams from 2003 to 2006.

As a freshman, he ranked second in the Southeastern Conference (SEC) with 44.8 yards per punt which was the second highest in Florida's school history. He led all true freshman nationally and ranked eighth in the nation with his punt yardage average. Wilbur also tied the Florida record for most punts in a season. Against the Tennessee Volunteers, he kicked a 75-yard punt, which was a career high for him and was the fourth longest punt in school history. He was named a Freshman All-American by Rivals.com and a member of the Sporting News All-Freshman Team.

During his sophomore season, Wilbur was an honorable mention All-SEC selection. He was also named to the SEC Academic Honor Roll and was named co-outstanding special teams player at the end of the year.

Wilbur ranked sixth nationally with an average of 41.4 yards per punt as a junior and his 56 punts were third behind Blake McAdams who had 69 for Ole Miss and Britton Colquitt of Tennessee with 59. He collected 2,459 punt yards which was the highest in the SEC. His longest punt of the year was a 63-yarder against Iowa in the Outback Bowl. For the first time in his career, Wilbur handled the kickoffs against Wyoming.

During his senior year, Wilbur was named a semifinalist for the Ray Guy Award.

== Professional career ==
=== National Football League ===
Wilbur went undrafted in the 2007 NFL draft and was signed by the Houston Texans on May 1, 2007. He was released on August 8.

Wilbur was signed by the Jacksonville Jaguars on August 8, 2007. The Florida punter worked out for Jacksonville on a Tuesday, signed a contract, and was let go before the team even took the field for practice on Wednesday. Wilbur was signed by the New York Jets on April 15, 2009. He was waived on June 10, 2009.

=== Hamilton Tiger-Cats ===
Wilbur was signed by the Hamilton Tiger-Cats on August 4, 2010.

=== Omaha Nighthawks ===
Wilbur was signed by the Omaha Nighthawks of the United Football League on July 11, 2011.

=== Edmonton Eskimos ===
On February 1, 2012, Wilbur was signed by the Edmonton Eskimos.

=== Winnipeg Blue Bombers ===
After Edmonton had signed non-import free agent punter Burke Dales, the club traded Wilbur to the Winnipeg Blue Bombers for a conditional sixth round pick in the 2013 CFL draft on February 23, 2012. On June 21, 2012, Wilbur was released by the Blue Bombers.

=== Toronto Argonauts ===
On September 6, 2012, Wilbur was signed by the Toronto Argonauts as a replacement for injured starting kicker Swayze Waters. After appearing in one game, Wilbur was released by the Argonauts on September 11, 2012.

== Personal ==
Wibur is married to the former Ali Peek, a sports reporter and University of Florida alumna.

When he was signed by the Toronto Argonauts in 2012, Wilbur was then working as a bar manager at the Jesse Black Saloon in Casselberry, Florida.

== See also ==
- 2006 Florida Gators football team
- Florida Gators
- List of University of Florida alumni
