= 2003 Auburn Tigers football team =

American college football season

2003 Auburn Tigers football

Music City Bowl champion

Music City Bowl, W 28–14 vs. Wisconsin
- Conference: Southeastern Conference
- Western Division
- Record: 8–5 (5–3 SEC)
- Head coach: Tommy Tuberville (5th season)
- Offensive coordinator: Hugh Nall (1st season)
- Offensive scheme: Pro-style
- Defensive coordinator: Gene Chizik (2nd season)
- Base defense: 4–3
- Home stadium: Jordan–Hare Stadium

2003 Southeastern Conference football standings
	Conf.			Overall
Team	W		L	W		L
Eastern Division
No. 7 Georgia xy	6	–	2	11	–	3
No. 15 Tennessee x	6	–	2	10	–	3
No. 24 Florida x	6	–	2	8	–	5
South Carolina	2	–	6	5	–	7
Vanderbilt	1	–	7	2	–	10
Kentucky	1	–	7	4	–	8
Western Division
No. 2 LSU xy$#	7	–	1	13	–	1
No. 13 Ole Miss x	7	–	1	10	–	3
Auburn	5	–	3	8	–	5
Arkansas	4	–	4	9	–	4
Alabama	2	–	6	4	–	9
Mississippi State	1	–	7	2	–	10
Championship: LSU 34, Georgia 13
# – BCS National Champion; $ – BCS representative as conference champion; x – Division champion/co-champions; y – Championship game participant; Rankings from AP Poll

The 2003 Auburn Tigers football team represented Auburn University in the 2003 NCAA Division I-A football season. Auburn began the season with high expectations, but stumbled out of the gate before finishing the season with a disappointing 8–5 record, including a 5–3 record in the SEC, good for third place in the conference's Western Division. The Tigers, coached by Tommy Tuberville, began the season ranked #6 in both the AP Poll and the Coaches' Poll, but opened with consecutive losses to Southern California and Georgia Tech, dropping out of both polls.

The Tigers won their next four games, but remained unranked in either poll until the week after pulling a 10–3 upset win over Arkansas in Fayetteville on October 11, when they re-entered the AP Poll at #19 and the Coaches' Poll at #25. Following a victory over Mississippi State the following week, the Tigers climbed to #17 and #21 in the two polls, but after a 31–7 loss to eventual national champion LSU on October 25, the Tigers did not appear in either poll for the remainder of the season. However, several computer rating systems did include Auburn in their final rankings. The Tigers were ranked #17 by the BCS participating system of The New York Times, #18 by Entropy, and #19 consensus ranking by CollegeTop25.com.

After consecutive losses to Ole Miss, led by Eli Manning, and Georgia, the Tigers concluded a disappointing regular season by defeating arch rival Alabama, 28–23. In the postseason, Auburn knocked off Wisconsin 28–14 in the Music City Bowl, in Nashville, Tennessee.

The disappointment of the season led university president William Walker, athletic director David Housel, and other trustees to take a plane owned by trustee Bobby Lowder to meet in secret with Louisville Cardinals head coach Bobby Petrino about replacing Tuberville. This occurred prior to the Alabama game, but newspapers in Montgomery and Louisville discovered the flight and broke the news. The visit caused controversy and Tuberville was ultimately retained.

== Schedule ==
Date	Time	Opponent	Rank	Site	TV	Result	Attendance
August 30	2:30 pm	No. 8 USC*	No. 6	Jordan–Hare Stadium; Auburn, AL	CBS	L 0–23	86,063
September 6	2:30 pm	at Georgia Tech*	No. 17	Bobby Dodd Stadium; Atlanta, GA (rivalry)	ABC	L 3–17	55,000
September 13	11:30 am	at Vanderbilt		Vanderbilt Stadium; Nashville, TN	JPS	W 45–7	37,703
September 27	4:00 pm	No. 3 (I-AA) Western Kentucky*		Jordan–Hare Stadium; Auburn, AL	PPV	W 48–3	85,046
October 4	6:45 pm	No. 7 Tennessee		Jordan–Hare Stadium; Auburn, AL (rivalry)	ESPN	W 28–21	86,063
October 11	11:30 am	at No. 7 Arkansas		Donald W. Reynolds Razorback Stadium; Fayetteville, AR	JPS	W 10–3	74,026
October 18	1:30 pm	Mississippi State	No. 19	Jordan–Hare Stadium; Auburn, AL	PPV	W 45–13	86,063
October 25	6:45 pm	at No. 9 LSU	No. 17	Tiger Stadium; Baton Rouge, LA (rivalry)	ESPN	L 7–31	92,085
November 1	1:30 pm	Louisiana–Monroe*		Jordan–Hare Stadium; Auburn, AL		W 73–7	81,061
November 8	2:30 pm	No. 20 Ole Miss		Jordan–Hare Stadium; Auburn, AL (rivalry)	CBS	L 20–24	86,063
November 15	2:30 pm	at No. 7 Georgia		Sanford Stadium; Athens, GA (Deep South's Oldest Rivalry)	CBS	L 7–26	92,058
November 22	6:45 pm	Alabama		Jordan–Hare Stadium; Auburn, AL (Iron Bowl)	ESPN	W 28–23	86,063
December 31	11:00 am	vs. Wisconsin*		The Coliseum; Nashville, TN (Music City Bowl)	ESPN	W 28–14	55,109
*Non-conference game; Rankings from AP Poll released prior to the game; All times are in Central time

== Roster ==
2003 Auburn Tigers football team roster
Players
Coaches
Offense

Pos.	#	Name	Class
WR	1	Devin Aromashodu	So
RB	23	Ronnie Brown	Jr
QB	17	Jason Campbell	Jr
QB	12	Brandon Cox	Fr
G	65	Monreko Crittenden	Sr
WR	85	Silas Daniels	Jr
G	76	Tim Duckworth	Fr
OT	77	King Dunlap	Fr
RB	5	Brandon Jacobs	Jr
WR	81	Jeris McIntyre	Sr
OT	73	Marcus McNeill	So
TE	9	Anthony Mix	So
WR	2	Ben Obomanu	So
G	79	Jonathan Palmer	Fr
G	66	Troy Reddick	So
RB	22	Tre Smith	So
RB	32	Carl Stewart	Fr
QB	13	Josh Sullivan	Fr
WR	86	Courtney Taylor	Fr
TE	8	Cooper Wallace	So
RB	24	Carnell Williams	Jr

Defense

Pos.	#	Name	Class
SS	33	Eric Brock	Fr
LB	11	Karlos Dansby	Sr
SS	21	Karibi Dede	Fr
DE	54	Quentin Groves	Fr
DT	90	Ben Grubbs	Fr
DE	48	Marquies Gunn	Fr
FS	35	Will Herring	Fr
CB	6	Kevin Hobbs	Jr
CB	4	David Irons	Jr
NG	58	T. J. Jackson	So
DT	53	Spencer Johnson	Sr
CB	20	Pat Lee	Fr
DE	75	Stanley McClover	Fr
DE	83	Jay Ratliff	Jr
CB	14	Carlos Rogers	Jr
LB	56	LeMarcus Rowell	So
LB	54	Dontarrious Thomas	Sr
NG	97	Josh Thompson	Fr
DE	82	Reggie Torbor	Sr
LB	51	Travis Williams	So

Special teams

Pos.	#	Name	Class
P	30	Kody Bliss	Fr
K	37	John Vaughn	Fr

Head coach

- Tommy Tuberville

Coordinators/assistant coaches

Legend

- (C) Team captain
- (S) Suspended
- (I) Ineligible
- Injured
- Redshirt

Roster

== Captains ==
Position	Player
LB	Karlos Dansby
WR	Jeris McIntyre
LB	Dontarrious Thomas
