= 2003 Kentucky Wildcats football team =

American college football season

2003 Kentucky Wildcats football
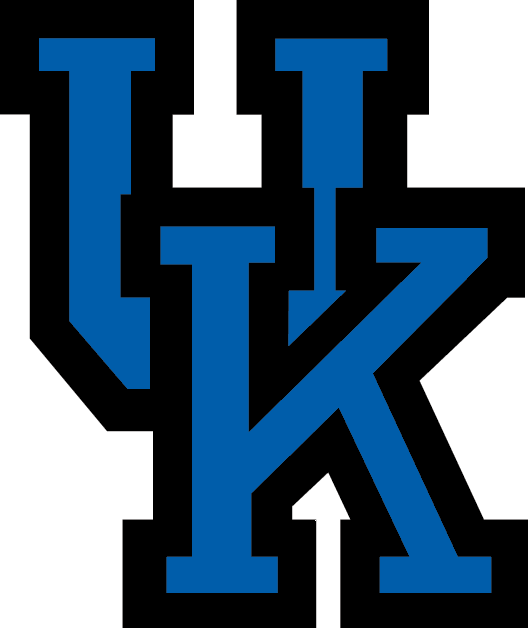
- Conference: Southeastern Conference
- Eastern Division
- Record: 4–8 (1–7 SEC)
- Head coach: Rich Brooks (1st season)
- Offensive coordinator: Ron Hudson (1st season)
- Offensive scheme: Pro-style
- Defensive coordinator: Mike Archer (4th season)
- Base defense: 4–3
- Home stadium: Commonwealth Stadium

2003 Southeastern Conference football standings
	Conf.			Overall
Team	W		L	W		L
Eastern Division
No. 7 Georgia xy	6	–	2	11	–	3
No. 15 Tennessee x	6	–	2	10	–	3
No. 24 Florida x	6	–	2	8	–	5
South Carolina	2	–	6	5	–	7
Vanderbilt	1	–	7	2	–	10
Kentucky	1	–	7	4	–	8
Western Division
No. 2 LSU xy$#	7	–	1	13	–	1
No. 13 Ole Miss x	7	–	1	10	–	3
Auburn	5	–	3	8	–	5
Arkansas	4	–	4	9	–	4
Alabama	2	–	6	4	–	9
Mississippi State	1	–	7	2	–	10
Championship: LSU 34, Georgia 13
# – BCS National Champion; $ – BCS representative as conference champion; x – Division champion/co-champions; y – Championship game participant; Rankings from AP Poll

The 2003 Kentucky Wildcats football team represented the University of Kentucky during the 2003 NCAA Division I-A football season. The team participated as members of the Southeastern Conference in the Eastern Division. They played their home games at Commonwealth Stadium in Lexington, Kentucky, United States.

The team was coached by Rich Brooks.

== Schedule ==
Date	Time	Opponent	Site	TV	Result	Attendance
August 31	6:30 pm	Louisville*	Commonwealth Stadium; Lexington, Kentucky (Battle for the Governor's Cup)	ESPN2	L 24–40	70,467
September 6	7:00 pm	Murray State*	Commonwealth Stadium; Lexington, Kentucky		W 37–6	63,306
September 13	7:45 pm	at Alabama	Bryant–Denny Stadium; Tuscaloosa, Alabama	ESPN	L 17–27	83,818
September 20	5:00 pm	at Indiana*	Memorial Stadium; Bloomington, Indiana (rivalry)		W 34–17	34,829
September 27	12:30 pm	No. 25 Florida	Commonwealth Stadium; Lexington, Kentucky (rivalry)	JPS	L 21–24	70,579
October 9	7:45 pm	at South Carolina	Williams-Brice Stadium; Columbia, South Carolina	ESPN	L 21–27	78,592
October 18	7:00 pm	Ohio*	Commonwealth Stadium; Lexington, Kentucky	PPV	W 35–14	61,107
October 25	12:30 pm	Mississippi State^{†}	Commonwealth Stadium; Lexington, Kentucky	JPS	W 42–7	57,141
November 1	7:00 pm	Arkansas	Commonwealth Stadium; Lexington, Kentucky	ESPN2	L 63–71 ^{7OT}	66,124
November 15	2:00 pm	at Vanderbilt	Vanderbilt Stadium; Nashville, Tennessee (rivalry)		L 17–28	26,440
November 22	12:30 pm	No. 6 Georgia^{†}	Sanford Stadium; Athens, Georgia	JPS	L 10–30	92,058
November 29	12:30 pm	No. 7 Tennessee	Commonwealth Stadium; Lexington, Kentucky (Battle for the Barrel)	JPS	L 7–20	65,733
*Non-conference game; ^{†}Homecoming; Rankings from AP Poll released prior to the game; All times are in Eastern time

== Roster ==
Player	Class	Position	Summary
Jared Lorenzen	SR	QB	101 Cmp, 336, Att, 2221 Yds, 16 TD
Shane Boyd	JR	QB	15 Cmp, 43 Att, 205 Yds, 2 TD
Arliss Beach*	SO	RB	103 Att, 366 Yds, 3.6 Avg
Alexis Bwenge*	SO	RB	72 Att, 318 Yds, 4.4 Avg
Draak Davis	JR	RB	68 Att, 194 yds, 2.9 Avg
Ronald Johnson	SO	RB	20 Att, 84 Yds, 4.2 Avg
Monquantae Gibson	FR	RB	6 Att, 12 Yds, 2.0 Avg
Justin Sprowles	SO	RB	1 Att, 3 Yds, 3.0 Avg
Andrew Hopewell	SO	RB	24 Yds, 24.0 Avg
Tommy Cook*	JR	WR	21 Rec, 222 Yds, 10.6 Avg
Derek Abney*	SR	WR	51 Rec, 616 Yds, 12.1 Avg
Keenan Burton	FR	WR	20 Rec, 221 Yds, 11.1 Avg
Chris Bernard	SR	WR	33 Rec, 532 Yds, 16.1 Avg
Glenn Holt	SO	WR	14 Rec, 164 Yds, 11.7 Avg
Maurice Marchman	FR	WR	1 Rec, 25 Yds, 25.0 Avg
Win Gaffron III	SR	TE	6 Rec, 97 Yds, 16.2 Avg
Jeremiah Drobney	SO	TE	9 Rec, 88 Yds, 9.8 Avg
Bruce Fowler	FR	TE	3 Rec, 36 Yds, 12.0 Avg
Antonio Hall*		OL	
Matt Huff*		OL	
Sylvester Miller*		OL	
Jason Rollins*		OL	
Nick Seitze*		OL	
Nate VanSickel		OL	
Sevin Sucurovic	JR	K	
Taylor Begley	SO	K	
Vincent Burns*	JR	DL	
Jeremy Caudill*		DL	
Lamar Mills*		DL	
Ellery Moore		DL	
Chad Anderson*	SO	DL	
Deion Holts*		LB	
Durrell White*		LB	
Dustin Williams*		LB	
Raymond Fontaine		LB	
Justin Haydock	JR	LB	
Muhammad Abdullah*	SO	DB	
Earven Flowers*	JR	DB	
Bo Smith	SO	DB	
Mike Williams*	JR	DB	
Leonard Burress	SR	DB	
Antoine Huffman	SO	DB	
Claude Sagaille	JR	DB	
Anthony Thornton	JR	P	

Starters are marked with an asterisk (*).
