= 2003 Florida Gators football team =

American college football season

2003 Florida Gators football

SEC Eastern Division co-champion

Outback Bowl, L 17–37 vs. Iowa
- Conference: Southeastern Conference
- Eastern Division

Ranking
- Coaches: No. 25
- AP: No. 24
- Record: 8–5 (6–2 SEC)
- Head coach: Ron Zook (2nd season)
- Offensive coordinator: Ed Zaunbrecher (2nd season)
- Offensive scheme: Spread
- Defensive coordinator: Charlie Strong (1st season)
- Base defense: 4–3
- Captains: Daryl Dixon; Keiwan Ratliff; Max Starks; Ben Troupe
- Home stadium: Ben Hill Griffin Stadium

2003 Southeastern Conference football standings
	Conf.			Overall
Team	W		L	W		L
Eastern Division
No. 7 Georgia xy	6	–	2	11	–	3
No. 15 Tennessee x	6	–	2	10	–	3
No. 24 Florida x	6	–	2	8	–	5
South Carolina	2	–	6	5	–	7
Vanderbilt	1	–	7	2	–	10
Kentucky	1	–	7	4	–	8
Western Division
No. 2 LSU xy$#	7	–	1	13	–	1
No. 13 Ole Miss x	7	–	1	10	–	3
Auburn	5	–	3	8	–	5
Arkansas	4	–	4	9	–	4
Alabama	2	–	6	4	–	9
Mississippi State	1	–	7	2	–	10
Championship: LSU 34, Georgia 13
# – BCS National Champion; $ – BCS representative as conference champion; x – Division champion/co-champions; y – Championship game participant; Rankings from AP Poll

The 2003 Florida Gators football team represented the University of Florida as a member of the Eastern Division in the Southeastern Conference (SEC) during the 2003 NCAA Division I-A football season. Led by second-year head Ron Zook, the Gators compiled an overall record of 8–5 with mark of 6–2 in conference play, sharing the SEC's Eastern Division title with Georgia and Tennessee. Florida was invited to the Outback Bowl, where the Gators lost Iowa. The team played home games at Ben Hill Griffin Stadium on the university's Gainesville, Florida campus.

Consensus All-American Keiwan Ratliff set the school single-season interception mark in 2003 with 9.

== Schedule ==
Date	Opponent	Rank	Site	TV	Result	Attendance	Source
August 30	San Jose State*		Ben Hill Griffin Stadium; Gainesville, FL	PPV	W 65–3	90,011	
September 6	at No. 3 Miami (FL)*	No. 21	Miami Orange Bowl; Miami, FL (rivalry)	ABC	L 33–38	79,932	
September 13	Florida A&M*	No. 19	Ben Hill Griffin Stadium; Gainesville, FL	PPV	W 63–3	90,087	
September 20	No. 12 Tennessee	No. 17	Ben Hill Griffin Stadium; Gainesville, FL (rivalry)	CBS	L 10–24	90,332	
September 27	at Kentucky	No. 25	Commonwealth Stadium; Lexington, KY (rivalry)	JPS	W 24–21	70,579	
October 4	Ole Miss	No. 24	Ben Hill Griffin Stadium; Gainesville, FL	JPS	L 17–20	90,101	
October 11	at No. 6 LSU		Tiger Stadium; Baton Rouge, LA (rivalry)	CBS	W 19–7	92,077	
October 18	at No. 11 Arkansas		Razorback Stadium; Fayetteville, AR	CBS	W 33–28	73,934	
November 1	vs. No. 4 Georgia	No. 23	Alltel Stadium; Jacksonville, FL (rivalry)	CBS	W 16–13	84,411	
November 8	Vanderbilt^{†}	No. 17	Ben Hill Griffin Stadium; Gainesville, FL	PPV	W 35–17	90,122	
November 15	at South Carolina	No. 15	Williams–Brice Stadium; Columbia, SC	JPS	W 24–22	81,523	
November 29	No. 9 Florida State*	No. 11	Ben Hill Griffin Stadium; Gainesville, FL (rivalry, College GameDay)	CBS	L 34–38	90,407	
January 1, 2004	vs. No. 13 Iowa*	No. 17	Raymond James Stadium; Tampa, FL (Outback Bowl)	ESPN	L 17–37	65,372	
*Non-conference game; ^{†}Homecoming; Rankings from AP Poll released prior to the game

== Game summaries ==
=== San Jose State ===
Team	1	2	3	4	Total
San Jose St	3	0	0	0	3
• Florida	3	27	14	21	65

- Date: August 30
- Location: Ben Hill Griffin Stadium, Gainesville, Florida
- Game start: 6:00 p.m. EST
- Elapsed time: 3:25
- Game attendance: 90,011
- Game weather: Warm and humid • 82 °F (28 °C) • Wind 5 E
- Referee: Jay Vines

Scoring summary
Q1	SJSU	Carr 47 yard field goal	SJSU 3–0
Q1	FLA	Leach 20 yard field goal	Tie 3–3
Q2	FLA	Leach 37 yard field goal	FLA 6–3
Q2	FLA	Carthon 2 yard run (Leach kick)	FLA 13–3
Q2	FLA	Kight 21 yard pass from Martin (Leach kick)	FLA 20–3
Q2	FLA	Scott 38 yard interception return (Leach kick)	FLA 27–3
Q2	FLA	Leach 30 yard field goal	FLA 30–3
Q3	FLA	Carthon 2 yard run (Leach kick)	FLA 37–3
Q3	FLA	Kight 16 yard pass from Leak (Leach kick)	FLA 44–3
Q4	FLA	Lewis 22 yard fumble return (Leach kick)	FLA 51–3
Q4	FLA	Jackson 29 yard pass from Dickey (Leach kick)	FLA 58–3
Q4	FLA	Orr 72 yard interception return (Leach kick)	FLA 65–3

=== Miami (FL) ===
Team	1	2	3	4	Total
Florida	10	9	14	0	33
• Miami (FL)	10	0	15	13	38

- Date: September 6
- Location: Orange Bowl
- Game start: 8:00 p.m. EST
- Elapsed time: 3:42
- Game attendance: 79,932
- Game weather: Cloudy 67% Hum • 87 °F (31 °C) • Wind 14 SW

=== Florida A&M ===
Team	1	2	3	4	Total
Florida A&M	3	0	0	0	3
• Florida	14	21	7	21	63

- Date: September 13
- Location: Ben Hill Griffith Stadium
- Game start: 6:00 p.m. EST

=== Tennessee ===
Team	1	2	3	4	Total
• Tennessee	0	7	10	7	24
Florida	3	0	0	7	10

- Date: September 20
- Location: Ben Hill Griffith Stadium
- Game start: 12:00 p.m. EST

=== Kentucky ===
Team	1	2	3	4	Total
• Florida	0	3	0	21	24
Kentucky	7	7	7	0	21

- Date: September 27
- Location: Commonwealth Stadium
- Game start: 12:30 p.m. EST

=== Ole Miss ===
Team	1	2	3	4	Total
• Ole Miss	3	7	3	7	20
Florida	7	10	0	0	17

- Date: October 4
- Location: Ben Hill Griffith Stadium
- Game start: 12:30 p.m. EST

=== LSU ===
Team	1	2	3	4	Total
• Florida	10	3	6	0	19
LSU	7	0	0	0	7

- Date: October 11
- Location: Tiger Stadium

=== Arkansas ===
Team	1	2	3	4	Total
• Florida	0	13	13	7	33
Arkansas	7	0	0	21	28

- Date: October 18
- Location: Donald W. Reynolds Razorback Stadium

=== Georgia ===
Team	1	2	3	4	Total
Georgia	0	3	0	10	13
• Florida	0	3	7	6	16

- Date: November 1
- Location: Alltel Stadium

=== Vanderbilt ===
Team	1	2	3	4	Total
Vanderbilt	7	3	0	7	17
• Florida	14	7	7	7	35

- Date: November 8
- Location: Ben Hill Griffith Stadium

=== South Carolina ===
Team	1	2	3	4	Total
• Florida	0	7	17	0	24
South Carolina	9	7	6	0	22

- Date: November 15
- Location: Williams–Brice Stadium

=== Florida State ===
Florida State Seminoles (9–2) at Florida Gators (8–3)

Quarter	1	2	3	4	Total
Florida State	7	10	7	14	38
Florida	3	3	18	10	34

at Ben Hill Griffith Stadium • Gainesville, Florida

- Date: November 29
- Game time: 3:20 p.m. EST
- Game weather: Fair • 54 °F (12 °C) • Wind 10 NW
- Game attendance: 90,407
- Referee: Jack Childress
- TV: CBS
- Box Score

Game information

Florida St

- Rix
  14/19, 256 Yds, 3 TD
- Washington
  15 Rush, 65 Yds
- Robinson
  5 Rec, 102 Yds, TD

Florida

- Leak
  22/36, 273 Yds, 2 TD
- Carthon
  13 Rush, 62 Yds
- Troupe
  4 Rec, 121 Yds, 2 TD

Scoring summary

Quarter	Time	Drive			Team	Scoring information	Score	
Quarter	Time	Plays	Yards	TOP	Team	Scoring information	FSU	FLA
1	6:05	11	46	4:27	Florida	47-yard field goal by Leach	0	3
1	1:46	8	78	4:19	Florida St	Robinson 35-yard touchdown reception from Rix, Beitia kick good	7	3
2	7:31	11	57	6:29	Florida St	28-yard field goal by Beitia	10	3
2	5:31	5	21	2:00	Florida	47-yard field goal by Leach	10	6
2	5:02	2	23	0:29	Florida St	Henshaw 20-yard touchdown reception from Rix, Beitia kick good	17	6
3	13:25	5	78	1:35	Florida	Troupe 25-yard touchdown reception from Leak, 2-point run good	17	14
3	7:44	9	41	3:30	Florida	42-yard field goal by Leach	17	17
3	6:10				Florida	Fumble recovery returned 77 yards for touchdown by Ratliff, Leach kick good	17	24
3	2:49				Florida St	Fumble recovery returned 25 yards for touchdown by Watkins, Beitia kick good	24	24
4	8:01	11	81	3:24	Florida	28-yard field goal by Leach	24	27
4	5:01	8	80	3:00	Florida St	Rix 1-yard touchdown run, Beitia kick good	31	27
4	2:50	9	60	2:11	Florida	Troupe 25-yard touchdown reception from Leak, Leach kick good	31	34
4	0:55	5	72	1:55	Florida St	Sam 52-yard touchdown reception from Rix, Beitia kick good	38	34
"TOP" = time of possession. For other American football terms, see Glossary of American football.							38	34

=== Outback Bowl ===
Team	1	2	3	4	Total
• Iowa	7	13	14	3	37
Florida	7	0	3	7	17

- Date: January 1
- Location: Raymond James Stadium

== Roster ==
2003 Florida Gators football team roster
Players
Coaches
Offense

Pos.	#	Name	Class
WR	81	Dallas Baker	Fr
OT	67	Steven Bell	Sr
WR	16	Vernell Brown	So
OL	66	Todd Bunce	Fr
OT	72	Lance Butler	So
TE	85	Hunter Cain	So
WR	5	Andre Caldwell	Fr
TE	83	Darrell Carpenter	Jr
OL	71	Ryan Carter	Fr
RB	33	Ran Carthon	Sr
RB	20	Joe Cohen	Fr
OT	78	Jonathan Colon	Jr
WR	41	Casey Conner	Sr
WR	6	Jemalle Cornelius	Fr
C	68	Mike Degory	So
QB	17	Gavin Dickey	Fr
RB	4	Ciatrick Fason	So
TE	82	Otto Graham	So
OL	65	Billy Griffin	Jr
OL	64	Anthony Guerrero	Jr
RB	48	Tyler Guettler	Fr
G	74	Randy Hand	So
FB	45	Eddie Hatch	So
WR	37	Tim Higgins	Fr
WR	8	Chad Jackson	Fr
RB	46	Pat Kelley	Fr
TE	88	David Kenner	Jr
WR	2	Kelvin Kight	Sr
OL	60	Zach King	Fr
QB	9	Matt Kynes	Fr
FB	42	Billy Latsko	Fr
RB	27	DaJuan Lawrence	Fr
QB	12	Chris Leak	Fr
WR	22	Reggie Lewis	Fr
QB	10	Ingle Martin	So
G	63	Jonathan Marvin	So
OL	52	Slyvester McGrew	Sr
OL	73	Carlton Medder	Fr
QB	14	Justin Midgett	Fr
WR	28	Kyle Morgan	So
WR	87	Jimmy Newmeyer	So
OL	70	Chris Parker	Fr
WR	23	Carlos Perez	Sr
OL	79	Steve Rissler	Fr
WR	11	O.J. Small	Jr
G	75	Shannon Snell	Sr
OT	77	Max Starks	Sr
OL	62	James Stone	Fr
RB	25	Skyler Thornton	Fr
WR	3	Kenneth Tookes	Fr
TE	84	Ben Troupe	Sr
WR	80	Reggie Vickers	Jr
RB	24	Jimtavis Walker	Fr
OT	76	Tavares Washington	Jr
RB	21	DeShawn Wynn	Fr

Defense

Pos.	#	Name	Class
S	32	Zephrin Augustine	Jr
S	7	Cory Bailey	Jr
CB	36	Nick Brooks	Fr
DB	45	Adam Brown	Fr
LB	28	Richard Brown	Fr
LB	52	Alvin Butler	Fr
CB	24	Deshawn Carter	So
LB	92	Taurean Charles	Fr
LB	49	Shane Cimcock	So
LB	55	Channing Crowder	Fr
LB	13	Brian Crum	Fr
S	34	Daryl Dixon	Sr
DT	62	Ronald Dowdy	Jr
DB	39	William Foxe	Fr
LB	30	Earl Everett	Fr
LB	43	Matt Farrior	Sr
LB	40	Reid Fleming	Sr
LB	54	Doug Guziec	Fr
DE	93	Steven Harris	Fr
DE	27	Travis Harris	Jr
S	46	Jarvis Herring	So
DT	90	Michael Hill	Fr
DB	35	Reynaldo Hill	Jr
DT	56	Eric Holcombe	Jr
CB	49	Terrence Holmes	Fr
LB	29	Dwight Jackson	Sr
CB	19	Matt Jackson	Sr
CB	31	Johnny Lamar	Sr
DE	86	Darrell Lee	Sr
LB	99	Howard Lingard	Fr
CB	26	Jermaine McCollum	Fr
CB	18	Tremaine McCollum	Fr
DE	57	Bobby McCray	Sr
LB	47	Todd McCullough	Jr
DT	95	Ray McDonald	Fr
DT	98	Clint McMillan	Fr
DT	61	Mo Mitchell	Jr
DE	97	Tranelle Morant	Fr
DE	94	Jarvis Moss	Fr
DB	37	Matt Nedeff	Jr
DT	96	Dwayne Norris	Jr
S	22	Tre Orr	Jr
DT	58	Kenny Parker	Jr
DE	85	MacKenzie Pierre	Fr
CB	1	Keiwan Ratliff	Sr
DE	59	Julian Riley	Fr
LB	51	Bryan Royal	So
DE	89	Jeremy Sandow	Sr
LB	53	Alik Scott	So
S	9	Guss Scott	Sr
DB	28	Jermaine Thomas	Fr
DT	44	Marcus Thornton	Fr
DB	15	Demetric Webb	Fr

Special teams

Pos.	#	Name	Class
P	97	Nick Fleming	So
LS	69	Casey Griffith	Sr
PK	39	Chris Hetland	Fr
P	18	Jason Hunter	Jr
PK	14	Matt Leach	Jr
LS	73	Jonathan Lively	Jr
P	92	Sean Morton	Sr
PK	12	Eric Nappy	Fr
LS	50	Jay Patella	Fr
PK	38	Matt Piotrowicz	Jr
PK	93	Brendt Talcott	Sr
PK	95	Jeff Whitaker	Jr
P	10	Eric Wilbur	Fr

Head coach

- Ron Zook

Coordinators/assistant coaches

- Jerry Anderson
- Dwayne Dixon
- Larry Fedora
- Mike Locksley
- Bill Miller
- Charlie Strong
- Joe Wickline
- Mike Woodford
- Ed Zaunbrecher

Legend

- (C) Team captain
- (S) Suspended
- (I) Ineligible
- Injured
- Redshirt

Roster
Last update: 27 January 2018

== Players drafted into the NFL ==
Round	Pick	Player	Position	NFL club
2	40	Ben Troupe	TE	Tennessee Titans
2	49	Keiwan Ratliff	CB	Cincinnati Bengals
3	75	Max Starks	OT	Pittsburgh Steelers
3	95	Guss Scott	SS	New England Patriots
7	249	Bobby McCray	DE	Jacksonville Jaguars

== Bibliography ==
- 2009 Southeastern Conference Football Media Guide, Florida Year-by-Year Records, Southeastern Conference, Birmingham, Alabama, p. 60 (2009).
- 2012 Florida Football Media Guide, University Athletic Association, Gainesville, Florida, pp. 107–116 (2012).
- Carlson, Norm, University of Florida Football Vault: The History of the Florida Gators, Whitman Publishing, LLC, Atlanta, Georgia (2007). ISBN 0-7948-2298-3.
