= Tory Collins =

American football player (born 1982)

Profile
- Position: Defensive tackle

Personal information
- Born: December 29, 1982 (age 43); New Orleans, Louisiana, U.S.
- Listed height: 6 ft 2 in (1.88 m)
- Listed weight: 280 lb (127 kg)

Career information
- High school: Alcee Fortier (New Orleans)
- College: Northwestern State

Career history
- 2007: Chicago Bears
- 2008: BC Lions
- 2010: Hamilton Tiger-Cats, Alaska Wild
- 2011: Sioux Falls Storm

Awards and highlights
- BCS national champion (2003)[; All-American (Twice)

Tory Collins (born December 29, 1982) is an American former professional football player who played in the National Football League (NFL), Canadian Football League (CFL), Arena Football League (AFL) and Indoor Football League (IFL). He played college football for the Northwestern State Demons.

== Playing career ==
=== College career ===
Collins was a defensive tackle from Northwestern State University. He transferred to Northwestern State after originally playing at LSU.

=== Professional career ===
Collins played in three NFL games with the Chicago Bears during their 2007 season. In those games he recorded 2 Sacks against Houston Texans 3 Tackles for loss and 1 single tackle in a loss to the Cleveland Browns.

== Personal life ==
Collins hails from New Orleans, Louisiana, where his family lived until their home was destroyed by Hurricane Katrina in 2005. He cited his desire to help his family as one of his biggest motivations to excel as a professional athlete. Collins also played to honor the memory of Marquise Hill, a former NFL player and close friend, who died on May 28, 2007.
