= 2003 Arkansas Razorbacks football team =

American college football season

2003 Arkansas Razorbacks football

Independence Bowl champion

Independence Bowl, W 27–14 vs. Missouri
- Conference: Southeastern Conference
- Western Division
- Record: 9–4 (4–4 SEC)
- Head coach: Houston Nutt (6th season)
- Offensive coordinator: Roy Wittke (1st season)
- Offensive scheme: Pro-style
- Defensive coordinator: Dave Wommack (2nd season)
- Base defense: 4–3
- Captains: Jimmy Beasley; Tony Bua; Bo Lacy; Caleb Miller; Justin Scott; George Wilson
- Home stadium: Donald W. Reynolds Razorback Stadium; War Memorial Stadium

2003 Southeastern Conference football standings
	Conf.			Overall
Team	W		L	W		L
Eastern Division
No. 7 Georgia xy	6	–	2	11	–	3
No. 15 Tennessee x	6	–	2	10	–	3
No. 24 Florida x	6	–	2	8	–	5
South Carolina	2	–	6	5	–	7
Vanderbilt	1	–	7	2	–	10
Kentucky	1	–	7	4	–	8
Western Division
No. 2 LSU xy$#	7	–	1	13	–	1
No. 13 Ole Miss x	7	–	1	10	–	3
Auburn	5	–	3	8	–	5
Arkansas	4	–	4	9	–	4
Alabama	2	–	6	4	–	9
Mississippi State	1	–	7	2	–	10
Championship: LSU 34, Georgia 13
# – BCS National Champion; $ – BCS representative as conference champion; x – Division champion/co-champions; y – Championship game participant; Rankings from AP Poll

The 2003 Arkansas Razorbacks football team represented the University of Arkansas as a member of the Southeastern Conference (SEC) during the 2003 NCAA Division I-A football season. Led by sixth-year head coach Houston Nutt, the Razorbacks compiled an overall record 9–4 with a mark of 4–4 in conference play, placing fourth in the SEC's Western Division.. Arkansas was invited to the Independence Bowl, where the Razorbacks defeated Missouri. The team played home games at Razorback Stadium in Fayetteville, Arkansas and War Memorial Stadium in Little Rock, Arkansas.

On November 1, Arkansas beat Kentucky in a game that went to seven overtimes. At the time, it tied the record for the most overtimes in an National Collegiate Athletic Association (NCAA) football game.

Seven Razorbacks were named to the 2003 All-SEC football team after the regular season: RB Cedric Cobbs, WR George Wilson, TE Jason Peters, OT Shawn Andrews, LB Caleb Miller, CB Ahmad Carroll, and S Tony Bua. Andrews was also awarded the Jacobs Blocking Trophy, given to the best offensive lineman in the SEC, for the second consecutive year. Andrews was also named a consensus All-American for the second straight season as well.

== Schedule ==
Date	Time	Opponent	Rank	Site	TV	Result	Attendance
September 6	6:00 pm	Tulsa*		Donald W. Reynolds Razorback Stadium; Fayetteville, AR		W 45–13	69,442
September 13	11:00 am	at No. 6 Texas*		Darrell K Royal–Texas Memorial Stadium; Austin, TX (rivalry)	ABC	W 38–28	83,271
September 20	6:00 pm	North Texas*	No. 14	War Memorial Stadium; Little Rock, AR		W 31–7	55,825
September 27	2:30 pm	at Alabama	No. 9	Bryant–Denny Stadium; Tuscaloosa, AL	CBS	W 34–31 ^{2OT}	83,818
October 11	11:30 am	Auburn^{†}	No. 7	Donald W. Reynolds Razorback Stadium; Fayetteville, AR	JPS	L 3–10	74,026
October 18	2:30 pm	Florida	No. 11	Donald W. Reynolds Razorback Stadium; Fayetteville, AR	CBS	L 28–33	73,934
October 25	6:15 pm	at Ole Miss	No. 21	Vaught–Hemingway Stadium; Oxford, MS (rivalry)	ESPN2	L 7–19	58,717
November 1	6:00 pm	at Kentucky		Commonwealth Stadium; Lexington, KY	ESPN2	W 71–63 ^{7OT}	66,124
November 6	6:30 pm	South Carolina		War Memorial Stadium; Little Rock, AR	ESPN	W 28–6	55,617
November 15	1:00 pm	New Mexico State*		Donald W. Reynolds Razorback Stadium; Fayetteville, AR		W 48–20	53,725
November 22	1:00 pm	Mississippi State		Donald W. Reynolds Razorback Stadium; Fayetteville, AR		W 52–6	62,547
November 28	1:30 pm	at No. 3 LSU		Tiger Stadium; Baton Rouge, LA (rivalry])	CBS	L 24–55	92,213
December 31	6:30 pm	vs. Missouri*		Independence Stadium; Shreveport, LA (Independence Bowl, rivalry)	ESPN	W 27–14	49,625
*Non-conference game; ^{†}Homecoming; Rankings from AP Poll released prior to the game; All times are in Central time

== Game summaries ==
=== Tulsa ===
	1	2	3	4	Total
Golden Hurricane	3	0	3	7	13
Razorbacks	7	21	7	10	45

=== At No. 6 Texas ===
	1	2	3	4	Total
Razorbacks	14	7	7	10	38
No. 6 Longhorns	7	7	0	14	28

=== North Texas ===
	1	2	3	4	Total
Mean Green	7	0	0	0	7
No. 14 Razorbacks	7	24	0	0	31

=== At Alabama ===
	1	2	3	4	OT	2OT	Total
No. 9 Razorbacks	7	3	7	14	3	0	34
Crimson Tide	7	3	21	0	0	0	31

=== Auburn ===
	1	2	3	4	Total
Tigers	0	7	0	3	10
No. 7 Razorbacks	0	0	3	0	3

=== Florida ===
	1	2	3	4	Total
Gators	0	13	13	7	33
No. 11 Razorbacks	7	0	0	21	28

=== At Ole Miss ===
	1	2	3	4	Total
No. 21 Razorbacks	0	7	0	0	7
Rebels	7	3	3	6	19

=== At Kentucky ===
	1	2	3	4	OT	2OT	3OT	4OT	5OT	6OT	7OT	Total
Razorbacks	7	14	0	3	7	7	3	8	6	8	8	71
Wildcats	7	0	7	10	7	7	3	8	6	8	0	63

- (Q1, 7:57) ARK DeCori Birmingham 10 yard run (Chris Balseiro kick)
- (Q1, 0:10) UK Andrew Hopewell 6 yard blocked punt return (Taylor Begley kick)
- (Q2, 8:54) ARK – Richard Smith 26 yard pass from Matt Jones (Chris Balseiro kick)
- (Q2, 6:45) ARK – Tom Crowder recovered blocked punt in end zone (Chris Balseiro kick)
- (Q3, 3:44) UK – Alexis Bwenge 51 yard pass from Jared Lorenzen (Taylor Begley kick)
- (Q4, 7:11) UK – Taylor Begley 34 yard field goal
- (Q4, 3:22) ARK – Chris Balseiro 37 yard field goal
- (Q4, 1:38) UK – Chris Bernard 13 yard pass from Jared Lorenzen (Taylor Begley kick)
- (OT) ARK – Mark Pierce 1 yard run (Chris Balseiro kick)
- (OT) UK – Alexis Bwenge 2 yard run (Taylor Begley kick)
- (2OT) UK – Alexis Bwenge 7 yard run (Taylor Begley kick)
- (2OT) ARK – Jason Peters 7 yard pass from Matt Jones (Chris Balseiro kick)
- (3OT) ARK – Chris Balseiro 25 yard field goal
- (3OT) UK – Taylor Begley 24 yard field goal
- (4OT) UK – Jared Lorenzen 1 yard run (Derek Abney run)
- (4OT) ARK – Matt Jones 3 yard run (Mark Pierce pass from Matt Jones)
- (5OT) ARK – George Wilson 15 yard pass from Matt Jones (pass failed)
- (5OT) UK – Jared Lorenzen 2 yard run (pass failed)
- (6OT) UK – Jared Lorenzen 1 yard run (Tommy Cook run)
- (6OT) ARK – Mark Pierce 2 yard run (George Wilson pass from Matt Jones)
- (7OT) ARK – DeCori Birmingham 25 yard run (Jason Peters pass from Matt Jones)

=== South Carolina ===
	1	2	3	4	Total
Gamecocks	3	0	3	0	6
Razorbacks	7	7	7	7	28

=== New Mexico State ===
	1	2	3	4	Total
Aggies	0	10	7	3	20
Razorbacks	0	14	28	6	48

=== Mississippi State ===
	1	2	3	4	Total
Bulldogs	3	3	0	0	6
Razorbacks	0	21	21	10	52

=== At No. 3 LSU ===
	1	2	3	4	Total
Razorbacks	10	7	0	7	24
No. 3 Tigers	10	24	21	0	55

=== Vs. Missouri—Independence Bowl ===
	1	2	3	4	Total
Tigers	7	0	7	0	14
Razorbacks	3	18	3	3	27

- (Q1, 8:50) ARK – Chris Balseiro 33 yard field goal
- (Q1, 6:50) MIZZ – Zack Abron 1 yard run (Michael Matheny kick)
- (Q2, 13:09) ARK – Chris Balseiro 28 yard field goal
- (Q2, 7:24) ARK – Matt Jones 1 yard run (George Wilson pass from Matt Jones)
- (Q2, 5:59) ARK – Cedric Cobbs 41 yard run (Chris Balseiro kick)
- (Q3, 5:21) ARK – Chris Balseiro 25 yard field goal
- (Q3, 0:39) MIZZ – Brad Smith 5 yard run (Michael Matheny kick)
- (Q4, 12:57) ARK – Chris Balseiro 24 yard field goal

Arkansas RB Cedric Cobbs and LB Caleb Miller were named the bowl games Offensive and Defensive MVPs, respectively.
