= 2003 Ole Miss Rebels football team =

American college football season

2003 Ole Miss Rebels football

SEC Western Division co-champion Cotton Bowl Classic champion

Cotton Bowl Classic, W 31–28 vs. Oklahoma State
- Conference: Southeastern Conference
- Western Division

Ranking
- Coaches: No. 14
- AP: No. 13
- Record: 10–3 (7–1 SEC)
- Head coach: David Cutcliffe (5th season)
- Offensive coordinator: John Latina (4th season)
- Offensive scheme: Pro-style
- Defensive coordinator: Chuck Driesbach (2nd season)
- Base defense: 3–4
- Captains: Charlie Anderson; Chris Collins; Eli Manning; Jesse Mitchell
- Home stadium: Vaught–Hemingway Stadium

2003 Southeastern Conference football standings
	Conf.			Overall
Team	W		L	W		L
Eastern Division
No. 7 Georgia xy	6	–	2	11	–	3
No. 15 Tennessee x	6	–	2	10	–	3
No. 24 Florida x	6	–	2	8	–	5
South Carolina	2	–	6	5	–	7
Vanderbilt	1	–	7	2	–	10
Kentucky	1	–	7	4	–	8
Western Division
No. 2 LSU xy$#	7	–	1	13	–	1
No. 13 Ole Miss x	7	–	1	10	–	3
Auburn	5	–	3	8	–	5
Arkansas	4	–	4	9	–	4
Alabama	2	–	6	4	–	9
Mississippi State	1	–	7	2	–	10
Championship: LSU 34, Georgia 13
# – BCS National Champion; $ – BCS representative as conference champion; x – Division champion/co-champions; y – Championship game participant; Rankings from AP Poll

The 2003 Ole Miss Rebels football team represented the University of Mississippi during the 2003 NCAA Division I-A football season. Coached by David Cutcliffe, the Rebels played their home games at Vaught–Hemingway Stadium.

In the Egg Bowl, Ole Miss beat Mississippi State by a score of 31–0. Ole Miss held the lead in the series at 57–37–6.

== Schedule ==
Date	Time	Opponent	Rank	Site	TV	Result	Attendance
August 30	11:30 am	at Vanderbilt		Vanderbilt Stadium; Nashville, TN (rivalry)	JPS	W 24–21	29,411
September 6	11:00 am	at Memphis*		Liberty Bowl Memorial Stadium; Memphis, TN (rivalry)	ESPN2	L 34–44	51,914
September 13	6:00 pm	Louisiana–Monroe*		Vaught–Hemingway Stadium; Oxford, MS		W 59–14	50,654
September 27	6:00 pm	Texas Tech*		Vaught–Hemingway Stadium; Oxford, MS		L 45–49	54,649
October 4	11:30 am	at No. 24 Florida		Ben Hill Griffin Stadium; Gainesville, FL	JPS	W 20–17	90,101
October 11	1:00 pm	Arkansas State*^{†}		Vaught–Hemingway Stadium; Oxford, MS		W 55–0	51,286
October 18	11:30 am	Alabama		Vaught–Hemingway Stadium; Oxford, MS (rivalry)	JPS	W 43–28	60,825
October 25	6:15 pm	No. 21 Arkansas		Vaught–Hemingway Stadium; Oxford, MS (rivalry)	ESPN2	W 19–7	58,717
November 1	11:30 am	South Carolina	No. 20	Vaught–Hemingway Stadium; Oxford, MS	JPS	W 43–40	56,878
November 8	2:30 pm	at Auburn	No. 20	Jordan-Hare Stadium; Auburn, AL (rivalry)	CBS	W 24–20	86,063
November 22	2:30 pm	No. 3 LSU	No. 15	Vaught–Hemingway Stadium; Oxford, MS (rivalry)	CBS	L 14–17	62,552
November 27	6:30 pm	at Mississippi State	No. 17	Davis Wade Stadium; Starkville, MS (Egg Bowl)	ESPN	W 31–0	53,582
January 2	10:00 am	vs. No. 21 Oklahoma State*	No. 16	Cotton Bowl; Dallas, TX (Cotton Bowl Classic)	FOX	W 31–28	73,928
*Non-conference game; ^{†}Homecoming; Rankings from AP Poll released prior to the game; All times are in Central time

== Game summaries ==
=== Vanderbilt ===
Ole Miss Rebels (0–0) at Vanderbilt Commodores (0–0)

Quarter	1	2	3	4	Total
Rebels	0	6	8	10	24
Commdores	0	7	7	7	21

at Vanderbilt Stadium • Nashville, TN

- Date: Saturday, August 30, 2003
- Game time: 11:30 A.M. CST
- Game weather: cloudy • Temperature: 79 °F (26 °C)
- Game attendance: 29,411
- Referee: Steve Shaw
- TV: JPS

Game information

Second Quarter

- (14:00) Ole Miss – 51 yard field goal by Jonathan Nichols is good.
  Ole Miss 3–0; 11 plays, 42 yards, 12:00
- (5:05) Vanderbilt – Jay Cutler pass right side complete to Curtis Brancheau for a 1 yard touchdown. (Extra point by Tolga Ertugral is good.)
  Vanderbilt 7–3; 10 plays, 60 yards, 5:24
- (0:03) Ole Miss – 20 yard field goal by Jonathan Nichols is good.
  Vanderbilt 7–6; 9 plays, 58 yards, 5:25

Third Quarter

- (11:35) Vanderbilt – Benji Walker pass left side complete to Erik Davis for a 50 yard touchdown. (Extra point by Tolga Ertugral is good.)
  Vanderbilt 14–6; 1 play, 50 yards, 0:00
- (6:45) Ole Miss – Vashon Pearson rushed up the middle for a 1 yard touchdown. (2-pt. conversion attempt successful.)
  Tied 14–14; 8 plays, 73 yards, 3:29

Fourth Quarter

- (14:30) Vanderbilt – Jay Cutler pass right side complete to Brandon Smith for a 2 yard touchdown. (Extra point by Tolga Ertugral is good.)
  Vanderbilt 21–14; 5 plays, 43 yards, 12:05
- (9:35) Ole Miss – Eli Manning pass right side complete to Mike Espy for a 23 yard touchdown. (Extra point by Jonathan Nichols is good.)
  Tied 21–21; 5 plays, 73 yards, 1:40
- (4:49) Ole Miss – 54 yard field goal by Jonathan Nichols is good.
  Ole Miss 24–21; 8 plays, 55 yards, 1:41

Statistics	Ole Miss	Vanderbilt
First downs	19	19
Total yards	370	399
Rushes/yards	33/95	38/101
Passing yards	275	298
Passing: Comp–Att–Int	22–33–0	21–33–1
Time of possession	29:06	30:54

Team	Category	Player	Statistics
Ole Miss	Passing	Eli Manning	22/33, 275 yards, 1 TD, 0 INT
Ole Miss	Rushing	Tremaine Turner	13 carries, 55 yards, 0 TD
Ole Miss	Receiving	Chris Collins	6 receptions, 91 yards, 0 TD
Vanderbilt	Passing	Jay Cutler	20/32, 248 yards, 2 TD, 1 INT
Vanderbilt	Rushing	Kwane Doster	14 carries, 41 yards, 0 TD
Vanderbilt	Receiving	Erik Davis	6 receptions, 138 yards, 1 TD

=== Memphis ===
Ole Miss Rebels (1–0) at Memphis Tigers (1–0)

Quarter	1	2	3	4	Total
Rebels	0	17	17	0	34
Tigers	7	14	0	23	44

at Liberty Bowl Memorial Stadium • Memphis, TN

- Date: Saturday, September 6, 2003
- Game time: 11:00 A.M. CST
- Game weather: clear skies • Temperature: 74 °F (23 °C)
- Game attendance: 51,914
- Referee: Steve Landis
- TV: ESPN2

Game information

First Quarter

- (13:25) Memphis – Danny Wimprine pass right side complete to DeAngelo Williams for a 19 yard touchdown. (Extra point by Stephen Gostkowski is good.)
  Memphis 7–0; 3 plays, 26 yards, 1:40

Second Quarter

- (14:50) Memphis – DeAngelo Williams rushed right side for a 43 yard touchdown. (Extra point by Stephen Gostkowski is good.)
  Memphis 14–0; 5 plays, 69 yards, 10:20
- (12:10) Ole Miss – Eli Manning pass right side complete to Kerry Johnson for a 12 yard touchdown. (Extra point by Jonathan Nichols is good.)
  Memphis 14–7; 8 plays, 80 yards, 2:31
- (9:32) Ole Miss – 30 yard field goal by Jonathan Nichols is good.
  Memphis 14–10; 5 plays, 4 yards, 0:56
- (2:15) Ole Miss – Eli Manning pass left side complete to Taye Biddle for a 17 yard touchdown. (Extra point by Jonathan Nichols is good.)
  Ole Miss 17–14; 13 plays, 70 yards, 5:07
- (0:14) Memphis – Danny Wimprine pass across the middle complete to Maurice Avery for a 31 yard touchdown. (Extra point by Stephen Gostkowski is good.)
  Memphis 21–17; 10 plays, 77 yards, 1:43

Third Quarter

- (10:37) Ole Miss – Eli Manning pass right side complete to Lorenzo Townsend for a 5 yard touchdown. (Extra point by Jonathan Nichols is good.)
  Ole Miss 24–21; 1 play, 5 yards, 0:00
- (9:12) Ole Miss – Eli Manning pass right side complete to Bill Flowers for a 40 yard touchdown. (Extra point by Jonathan Nichols is good.)
  Ole Miss 31–21; 1 play, 40 yards, 0:00
- (1:31) Ole Miss – 25 yard field goal by Jonathan Nichols is good.
  Ole Miss 34–21; 12 plays, 50 yards, 4:03

Fourth Quarter

- (14:43) Memphis – DeAngelo Williams rushed left side for a 20 yard touchdown. (Extra point by Stephen Gostkowski is good.)
  Ole Miss 34–28 6 plays, 70 yards, 10:59
- (10:29) Memphis – 21 yard field goal by Stephen Gostkowski is good.
  Ole Miss 34–31; 8 plays, 76 yards, 2:06
- (6:40) Memphis – Danny Wimprine pass right side complete to Tavarious Davis for a 92 yard touchdown. (Extra point by Stephen Gostkowski is good.)
  Memphis 38–34; 3 plays, 91 yards, 0:18
- (3:35) Memphis – 42 yard field goal by Stephen Gostkowski is good.
  Memphis 41–34; 4 plays, 8 yards, 2:05
- (0:53) Memphis – 17 yard field goal by Stephen Gostkowski is good.
  Memphis 44–34; 7 plays, 35 yards, 2:23

Statistics	Ole Miss	Memphis
First downs	22	17
Total yards	408	506
Rushes/yards	30/116	36/117
Passing yards	292	389
Passing: Comp–Att–Int	26–48–2	19–34–0
Time of possession	33:02	26:58

Team	Category	Player	Statistics
Ole Miss	Passing	Eli Manning	26/48, 292 yards, 4 TD, 2 INT
Ole Miss	Rushing	Tremaine Turner	10 carries, 43 yards, 0 TD
Ole Miss	Receiving	Bill Flowers	6 receptions, 97 yards, 1 TD
Memphis	Passing	Danny Wimprine	18/32, 355 yards, 3 TD, 1 INT
Memphis	Rushing	DeAng Williams	28 carries, 135 yards, 2 TD
Memphis	Receiving	Tavariou Davis	3 receptions, 113 yards, 1 TD

=== Louisiana–Monroe ===
Louisiana–Monroe Indians (0–2) at Ole Miss Rebels (1–1)

Quarter	1	2	3	4	Total
Indians	7	0	0	7	14
Rebels	7	17	21	14	59

at Vaught–Hemingway Stadium • Oxford, MS

- Date: Saturday, September 13, 2003
- Game time: 6:00 P.M. CST
- Game weather: partly cloudy • Temperature: 77 °F (25 °C)
- Game attendance: 50,654
- Referee: Rogers Redding

Game information

First Quarter

- (13:10) Ole Miss – Eli Manning pass right side complete to Chris Collins for a 18 yard touchdown. (Extra point by Jonathan Nichols is good.)
  Ole Miss 7–0; 7 plays, 34 yards, 0:50
- (5:46) Louisiana–Monroe – Steven Jyles pass left side complete to Mack Vincent for a 24 yard touchdown.
  Tied 7–7; 9 plays, 49 yards, 2:00

Second Quarter

- (14:50) Ole Miss – Eli Manning rushed right side for a 3 yard touchdown. (Extra point by Jonathan Nichols is good.)
  Ole Miss 14–7; 14 plays, 76 yards, 14:10
- (3:00) Ole Miss – Vashon Pearson rushed up the middle for a 1 yard touchdown. (Extra point by Jonathan Nichols is good.)
  Ole Miss 21–7; 8 plays, 26 yards, 2:12
- (0:03) Ole Miss – 30 yard field goal by Jonathan Nichols is good.
  Ole Miss 24–7; 6 plays, 64 yards, 1:58

Third Quarter

- (10:38) Ole Miss – Eli Manning pass right side complete to Chris Collins for a 5 yard touchdown. (Extra point by Jonathan Nichols is good.)
  Ole Miss 31–7; 11 plays, 63 yards, 4:12
- (9:47) Ole Miss – Daniel Da Prato pass across the middle intercepted by Travis Johnson. Returned for a 45 yard touchdown.
  Ole Miss 38–7; 1 play, 44 yards, 0:00
- (6:50) Ole Miss – Eli Manning pass left side complete to Taye Biddle for a 49 yard touchdown. (Extra point by Jonathan Nichols is good.)
  Ole Miss 45–7; 3 plays, 62 yards, 0:40

Fourth Quarter

- (15:00) Ole Miss – Micheal Spurlock pass left side complete to Lorenzo Townsend for a 2 yard touchdown. (Extra point by Jonathan Nichols is good.)
  Ole Miss 52–7; 10 plays, 65 yards, 13:25
- (10:47) Louisiana–Monroe – Daniel Da Prato pass left side complete to Floyd Smith for a 20 yard touchdown. (Extra point by Tyler Kuecker is good.)
  Ole Miss 52–14; 9 plays, 80 yards, 4:01
- (2:25) Ole Miss – Jamal Pittman rushed up the middle for a 1 yard touchdown. (Extra point by Jonathan Nichols is good.)
  Ole Miss 59–14; 9 plays, 69 yards, 3:59

Statistics	Louisiana–Monroe	Ole Miss
First downs	21	30
Total yards	307	565
Rushes/yards	31/29	47/225
Passing yards	129	340
Passing: Comp–Att–Int	26–44–2	24–30–0
Time of possession	29:20	30:40

Team	Category	Player	Statistics
Louisiana–Monroe	Passing	Steven Jyles	14/21, 160 yards, 1 TD, 0 INT
Louisiana–Monroe	Rushing	Kevin Payne	16 carries, 34 yards, 0 TD
Louisiana–Monroe	Receiving	Floyd Smith	9 receptions, 128 yards, 1 TD
Ole Miss	Passing	Eli Manning	21/26, 353 yards, 3 TD, 0 INT
Ole Miss	Rushing	Jamal Pittman	13 carries, 75 yards, 1 TD
Ole Miss	Receiving	Chris Collins	9 carries, 121 yards, 2 TD

== Awards and honors ==
- Eli Manning: Johnny Unitas Golden Arm Award, Maxwell Award
- Jonathan Nichols: Lou Groza Award

== Team players in the NFL ==
Player	Round	Pick	Position	Club
Eli Manning	1	1	Quarterback	New York Giants
Stacy Andrews	4	123	Tackle	Cincinnati Bengals
Von Hutchins	6	173	Defensive back	Indianapolis Colts
Charlie Anderson	6	200	Defensive end	Houston Texans
