= 2003 South Carolina Gamecocks football team =

American college football season

2003 South Carolina Gamecocks football
- Conference: Southeastern Conference
- Eastern Division
- Record: 5–7 (2–6 SEC)
- Head coach: Lou Holtz (5th season)
- Offensive coordinator: Skip Holtz (5th season)
- Offensive scheme: Spread
- Defensive coordinator: Chris Cosh (1st season)
- Base defense: 4–3
- Home stadium: Williams-Brice Stadium

2003 Southeastern Conference football standings
	Conf.			Overall
Team	W		L	W		L
Eastern Division
No. 7 Georgia xy	6	–	2	11	–	3
No. 15 Tennessee x	6	–	2	10	–	3
No. 24 Florida x	6	–	2	8	–	5
South Carolina	2	–	6	5	–	7
Vanderbilt	1	–	7	2	–	10
Kentucky	1	–	7	4	–	8
Western Division
No. 2 LSU xy$#	7	–	1	13	–	1
No. 13 Ole Miss x	7	–	1	10	–	3
Auburn	5	–	3	8	–	5
Arkansas	4	–	4	9	–	4
Alabama	2	–	6	4	–	9
Mississippi State	1	–	7	2	–	10
Championship: LSU 34, Georgia 13
# – BCS National Champion; $ – BCS representative as conference champion; x – Division champion/co-champions; y – Championship game participant; Rankings from AP Poll

The 2003 South Carolina Gamecocks football team represented the University of South Carolina in the Southeastern Conference (SEC) during the 2003 NCAA Division I-A football season. The Gamecocks were led by Lou Holtz in his fifth season as head coach and played their home games in Williams–Brice Stadium in Columbia, South Carolina.

After starting the final two games of last season, Dondrial Pinkins was the Gamecocks' starting quarterback in 2003. South Carolina started 2–0 and ranked No. 25 after a blowout upset win over No. 15 Virginia, the first ranked opponent they had beaten since 2001, and the highest-ranked opponent they had beaten since 2000. However, out of the next five games, the Gamecocks lost three, all to top-10 opponents. South Carolina won one more game, against Vanderbilt, before ending the season on a four-game losing streak. This included a historic blowout loss to archrival Clemson in front of one of the largest crowds that Williams–Brice Stadium has ever held.

The Gamecocks finished the season with a final record of 5–7, but this would be their last losing season until 2015.

== Schedule ==
Date	Time	Opponent	Rank	Site	TV	Result	Attendance	Source
August 30	7:00 pm	Louisiana–Lafayette*		Williams–Brice Stadium; Columbia, SC	CSS	W 14–7	82,227	
September 6	12:30 pm	No. 15 Virginia*		Williams–Brice Stadium; Columbia, SC	JPS	W 31–7	80,150	
September 13	3:30 pm	at No. 8 Georgia	No. 25	Sanford Stadium; Athens, GA (rivalry)	CBS	L 7–31	92,058	
September 20	7:00 pm	UAB*		Williams–Brice Stadium; Columbia, SC		W 42–10	80,523	
September 27	7:45 pm	at No. 8 Tennessee		Neyland Stadium; Knoxville, TN (rivalry)	ESPN	L 20–23 ^{OT}	107,881	
October 9	7:45 pm	Kentucky		Williams–Brice Stadium; Columbia, SC	ESPN	W 27–21	78,592	
October 18	7:45 pm	No. 10 LSU		Williams–Brice Stadium; Columbia, SC	ESPN	L 7–33	82,525	
October 25	7:00 pm	Vanderbilt^{†}		Williams–Brice Stadium; Columbia, SC	PPV	W 35–24	77,227	
November 1	12:30 pm	at No. 20 Ole Miss		Vaught–Hemingway Stadium; Oxford, MS	JPS	L 40–43	56,878	
November 6	7:30 pm	at Arkansas		War Memorial Stadium; Little Rock, AR	ESPN	L 6–28	55,617	
November 15	12:30 pm	No. 15 Florida		Williams–Brice Stadium; Columbia, SC	JPS	L 22–24	81,523	
November 22	7:00 pm	Clemson*		Williams–Brice Stadium; Columbia, SC (rivalry)	ESPN2	L 17–63	83,987	
*Non-conference game; ^{†}Homecoming; Rankings from AP Poll released prior to the game; All times are in Eastern time

== Roster ==
2003 South Carolina Gamecocks football team roster
Players			Coaches
Offense: Pos. / # / Name / Class; WR / 82 / Troy Williamson / So	Defense: Pos. / # / Name / Class; S / 11 / Rodriques Wilson / Jr	Special teams: Pos. / # / Name / Class	Head coach: Lou Holtz; Coordinators/assistant coaches: John Gutekunst (Defensive backs coach); Legend: (C) Team captain; (S) Suspended; (I) Ineligible; Injured; Redshirt; Roster
