= 2003 Georgia Bulldogs football team =

American college football season

2003 Georgia Bulldogs football

SEC Eastern Division co-champion Capital One Bowl champion

SEC Championship Game, L 13–34 vs. LSU

Capital One Bowl, W 34–27 ^{OT} vs. Purdue
- Conference: Southeastern Conference
- Eastern Division

Ranking
- Coaches: No. 6
- AP: No. 7
- Record: 11–3 (6–2 SEC)
- Head coach: Mark Richt (3rd season)
- Offensive coordinator: Neil Callaway (3rd season)
- Offensive scheme: Pro-style
- Defensive coordinator: Brian VanGorder (3rd season)
- Base defense: 4–3
- Home stadium: Sanford Stadium

2003 Southeastern Conference football standings
	Conf.			Overall
Team	W		L	W		L
Eastern Division
No. 7 Georgia xy	6	–	2	11	–	3
No. 15 Tennessee x	6	–	2	10	–	3
No. 24 Florida x	6	–	2	8	–	5
South Carolina	2	–	6	5	–	7
Vanderbilt	1	–	7	2	–	10
Kentucky	1	–	7	4	–	8
Western Division
No. 2 LSU xy$#	7	–	1	13	–	1
No. 13 Ole Miss x	7	–	1	10	–	3
Auburn	5	–	3	8	–	5
Arkansas	4	–	4	9	–	4
Alabama	2	–	6	4	–	9
Mississippi State	1	–	7	2	–	10
Championship: LSU 34, Georgia 13
# – BCS National Champion; $ – BCS representative as conference champion; x – Division champion/co-champions; y – Championship game participant; Rankings from AP Poll

The 2003 Georgia Bulldogs football team represented the University of Georgia as a member of the Southeastern Conference (SEC) during the 2003 NCAA Division I-A football season. Led by third-year head coach Mark Richt, the Bulldogs compiled an overall record of 11–3 with a mark of 6–2 in conference play, sharing the SEC's Eastern Division title with Florida and Tennessee. Georgia advanced to the SEC Championship Game, where the Bulldogs lost to the eventual Bowl Championship Series (BCS) champion, LSU. The Bulldogs finished the season with an overtime win in the Capital One Bowl over Purdue. The team played home games at Sanford Stadium in Athens, Georgia.

== Schedule ==
Date	Time	Opponent	Rank	Site	TV	Result	Attendance	Source
August 30	12:00 p.m.	at Clemson*	No. 9	Memorial Stadium; Clemson, SC (rivalry)	ABC	W 30–0	82,034	
September 6	1:00 p.m.	Middle Tennessee*	No. 8	Sanford Stadium; Athens, GA	PPV	W 29–10	92,058	
September 13	3:30 p.m.	No. 25 South Carolina	No. 8	Sanford Stadium; Athens, GA (rivalry)	CBS	W 31–7	92,058	
September 20	3:30 p.m.	at No. 11 LSU	No. 7	Tiger Stadium; Baton Rouge, LA (College GameDay)	CBS	L 10–17	92,251	
October 4	3:30 p.m.	Alabama	No. 12	Sanford Stadium; Athens, GA (rivalry)	CBS	W 37–23	92,058	
October 11	7:45 p.m.	at No. 13 Tennessee	No. 8	Neyland Stadium; Knoxville, TN (rivalry)	ESPN2	W 41–14	107,517	
October 18	2:00 p.m.	at Vanderbilt	No. 5	Vanderbilt Stadium; Nashville, TN (rivalry)	PPV	W 27–8	27,823	
October 25	1:00 p.m.	UAB*^{†}	No. 5	Sanford Stadium; Athens, GA		W 16–13	92,058	
November 1	3:30 p.m.	vs. No. 23 Florida	No. 4	Alltel Stadium; Jacksonville, FL (rivalry)	CBS	L 13–16	84,411	
November 15	3:30 p.m.	Auburn	No. 6	Sanford Stadium; Athens, GA (Deep South's Oldest Rivalry)	CBS	W 26–7	92,058	
November 22	12:30 p.m.	Kentucky	No. 6	Sanford Stadium; Athens, GA	JPS	W 30–10	92,058	
November 29	1:00 p.m.	at Georgia Tech*	No. 5	Bobby Dodd Stadium; Atlanta, GA (Clean, Old-Fashioned Hate)	ABC	W 34–17	55,000	
December 6	8:00 p.m.	vs. No. 3 LSU	No. 5	Georgia Dome; Atlanta, GA (SEC Championship Game, College GameDay)	CBS	L 13–34	74,913	
January 1, 2004	1:00 p.m.	vs. No. 12 Purdue*	No. 11	Florida Citrus Bowl; Orlando, FL (Capital One Bowl)	ABC	W 34–27 ^{OT}	64,565	
*Non-conference game; ^{†}Homecoming; Rankings from AP Poll released prior to the game; All times are in Eastern time

== Rankings ==
Ranking movements Legend: ██ Increase in ranking ██ Decrease in ranking
	Week																
Poll	Pre	1	2	3	4	5	6	7	8	9	10	11	12	13	14	15	Final
AP	11	8	8	7	12	11	8	4	4	4	9	7	6	5	5	11	7
Coaches	9	8	8	7	12	12	10	5	5	4	9	6	6	5	5	11	6
BCS	Not released								4	5	10	9	6	7	7	12	Not released

== Game summaries ==
=== Clemson ===
Team	1	2	3	4	Total
• Georgia	10	3	3	14	30
Clemson	0	0	0	0	0

- Date: August 30
- Location: Memorial Stadium, Clemson, South Carolina
- Game start: 12:00 p.m. EST

Scoring summary
Q1	9:21	UGA	Fred Gibson 56 yard pass from David Greene (Billy Bennett kick)	UGA 7–0
Q1	1:50	UGA	Billy Bennett 34 yard field goal	UGA 10–0
Q2	11:09	UGA	Billy Bennett 30 yard field goal	UGA 13–0
Q3	4:32	UGA	Billy Bennett 42 yard field goal	UGA 16–0
Q4	5:53	UGA	David Greene 3 yard run (Billy Bennett kick)	UGA 23–0
Q4	2:42	UGA	D.J. Shockley 29 yard run (Billy Bennett kick)	UGA 30–0

== Roster ==
2003 Georgia Bulldogs football team roster
Players
Coaches
Offense

Pos.	#	Name	Class
QB	14	David Greene	Jr
OT	74	Max Jean-Gilles	So
QB	3	D. J. Shockley	So

Defense

Pos.	#	Name	Class
CB	22	Decory Bryant	Jr
LB	10	Thomas Davis	So
CB	23	Tim Jennings	So
DB	6	Sean Jones	Sr
DE	47	David Pollack	Jr

Special teams

Pos.	#	Name	Class

Head coach

- Mark Richt

Coordinators/assistant coaches

Legend

- (C) Team captain
- (S) Suspended
- (I) Ineligible
- Injured
- Redshirt

Roster
