= Josh Thompson (gridiron football) =

American gridiron football player (born 1985)

Profile
- Position: Defensive tackle

Personal information
- Born: March 15, 1985 (age 41); Statesboro, Georgia
- Listed height: 6 ft 0 in (1.83 m)
- Listed weight: 300 lb (136 kg)

Career information
- College: Auburn
- NFL draft: 2008: undrafted

Career history
- St. Louis Rams (2008)*; Montreal Alouettes (2009)*
- * Offseason or practice squad member only
- Stats at CFL.ca (archive)

Joshua Eric Thompson (born March 15, 1985) is an American former football defensive tackle. He was signed by the St. Louis Rams as an undrafted free agent in 2008. He played college football at Auburn. He has also played for the Montreal Alouettes of the Canadian Football League.
