= Marquise Hill =

American football player (1982–2007)

No. 91
- Position: Defensive end

Personal information
- Born: August 7, 1982; New Orleans, Louisiana, U.S.
- Died: May 28, 2007 (aged 24); Lake Pontchartrain, Louisiana, U.S.
- Listed height: 6 ft 7 in (2.01 m)
- Listed weight: 300 lb (136 kg)

Career information
- High school: De La Salle (New Orleans, Louisiana)
- College: LSU
- NFL draft: 2004: 2nd round, 63rd overall pick

Career history
- New England Patriots (2004–2006)

Awards and highlights
- Super Bowl champion (XXXIX); BCS national champion (2003)

Career NFL statistics
- Games played: 13
- Stats at Pro Football Reference

Marquise Hill (August 7, 1982 – May 28, 2007) was an American professional football defensive end for the New England Patriots of the National Football League (NFL). He was selected by the Patriots in the second round of the 2004 NFL draft. He played college football at LSU.

== Early life ==
Hill attended De La Salle High School in New Orleans, where he was named as an All-American and the best defensive lineman in the nation by many publications. He was recruited by LSU. He participated in the first-ever U.S. Army All-American Bowl game on December 30, 2000.

== College career ==
Hill played college football as a defensive end for the LSU Tigers from 2001 to 2003 during their national championship season.

== Professional career ==
Hill was selected by the New England Patriots in the second round with the 63rd overall pick in the 2004 NFL draft. He played in one game in 2004 and played in eight games in the 2005 season, making three tackles.

== Death ==
On the evening of May 27, 2007, Hill and his friend, Ashley Blazio, fell off a jet ski in Lake Pontchartrain, north of New Orleans. Neither of them wore personal flotation or tracking devices. According to Hill's agent, who spoke with Blazio, Hill "ended up saving her life, keeping her calm until she could grab onto a buoy." Blazio was rescued and sent to Tulane Medical Center. Coast Guard units searched the area. Hill's body was found by the Louisiana Department of Wildlife and Fisheries around 2:20 PM CDT on May 28.

Throughout their near-perfect 2007 season, the Patriots team wore a "91" insignia (Hill's number in his tenure with New England) on the back of their helmets in his honor. Teammate Jarvis Green, who had also been Hill's teammate at LSU, wore Hill's shoulder pads for the season. The Patriots built a tribute to Hill, including those pads and pictures of Hill, at their facility.

== See also ==
- List of American football players who died during their careers
