= 2003 Tennessee Volunteers football team =

American college football season

2003 Tennessee Volunteers football

SEC Eastern Division co-champion

Peach Bowl, L 14–27 vs. Clemson
- Conference: Southeastern Conference
- Eastern Division

Ranking
- Coaches: No. 16
- AP: No. 15
- Record: 10–3 (6–2 SEC)
- Head coach: Phillip Fulmer (11th season)
- Offensive coordinator: Randy Sanders (5th season)
- Offensive scheme: Pro-style
- Defensive coordinator: John Chavis (9th season)
- Base defense: Multiple 4–3
- Home stadium: Neyland Stadium

2003 Southeastern Conference football standings
	Conf.			Overall
Team	W		L	W		L
Eastern Division
No. 7 Georgia xy	6	–	2	11	–	3
No. 15 Tennessee x	6	–	2	10	–	3
No. 24 Florida x	6	–	2	8	–	5
South Carolina	2	–	6	5	–	7
Vanderbilt	1	–	7	2	–	10
Kentucky	1	–	7	4	–	8
Western Division
No. 2 LSU xy$#	7	–	1	13	–	1
No. 13 Ole Miss x	7	–	1	10	–	3
Auburn	5	–	3	8	–	5
Arkansas	4	–	4	9	–	4
Alabama	2	–	6	4	–	9
Mississippi State	1	–	7	2	–	10
Championship: LSU 34, Georgia 13
# – BCS National Champion; $ – BCS representative as conference champion; x – Division champion/co-champions; y – Championship game participant; Rankings from AP Poll

The 2003 Tennessee Volunteers football team represented the University of Tennessee in the 2003 NCAA Division I-A football season. The team was coached by Phillip Fulmer. The Vols played their home games in Neyland Stadium and competed in the Eastern Division of the Southeastern Conference (SEC). The Vols finished the season 10–3, 6–2 in SEC play, and lost the Peach Bowl 27–14 to Clemson.

== Schedule ==
Date	Time	Opponent	Rank	Site	TV	Result	Attendance
August 30	3:00 pm	Fresno State*	No. 12	Neyland Stadium; Knoxville, Tennessee	ESPN2	W 24–6	103,860
September 6	4:00 pm	Marshall*	No. 12	Neyland Stadium; Knoxville, Tennessee	ESPN2	W 34–24	106,520
September 20	12:00 pm	at No. 17 Florida	No. 12	Ben Hill Griffin Stadium; Gainesville, Florida (Third Saturday in September)	CBS	W 24–10	90,332
September 27	7:45 pm	South Carolina	No. 8	Neyland Stadium; Knoxville, Tennessee (rivalry)	ESPN	W 23–20 ^{OT}	107,881
October 4	7:45 pm	at Auburn	No. 7	Jordan–Hare Stadium; Auburn, Alabama (rivalry)	ESPN	L 21–28	86,063
October 11	7:45 pm	No. 8 Georgia	No. 13	Neyland Stadium; Knoxville, Tennessee (rivalry)	ESPN2	L 14–41	107,517
October 25	3:30 pm	at Alabama	No. 22	Bryant–Denny Stadium; Tuscaloosa, Alabama (Third Saturday in October)	CBS	W 51–43 ^{5OT}	83,818
November 1	4:00 pm	Duke*^{†}	No. 19	Neyland Stadium; Knoxville, Tennessee	PPV	W 23–6	104,772
November 8	12:00 pm	at No. 6 Miami (FL)*	No. 18	Miami Orange Bowl; Miami, Florida	ABC	W 10–6	69,722
November 15	12:30 pm	Mississippi State	No. 9	Neyland Stadium; Knoxville, Tennessee	JPS	W 59–21	104,223
November 22	1:00 pm	Vanderbilt	No. 9	Neyland Stadium; Knoxville, Tennessee (rivalry)	PPV	W 48–0	100,496
November 29	12:30 pm	at Kentucky	No. 7	Commonwealth Stadium; Lexington, Kentucky (Battle for the Barrel)	JPS	W 20–7	65,733
January 2	4:30 pm	vs. Clemson*	No. 6	Georgia Dome; Atlanta (Peach Bowl)	ESPN	L 14–27	75,125
*Non-conference game; ^{†}Homecoming; Rankings from AP Poll released prior to the game; All times are in Eastern time

== Personnel ==
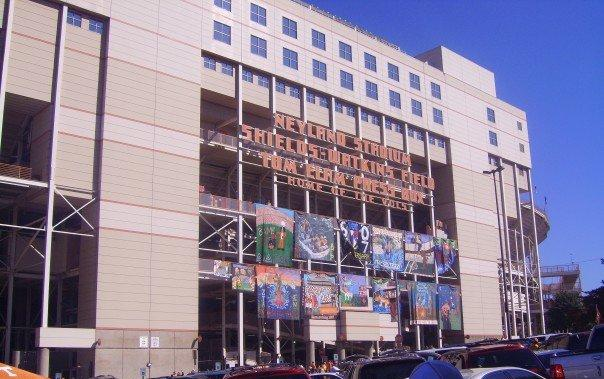
Neyland Stadium hosted seven Tennessee home games in 2003.

=== Roster ===
2003 Tennessee Volunteers football team roster
Players
Coaches
Offense

Pos.	#	Name	Class
QB	7	Casey Clausen	Sr
WR	10	Mark Jones	Sr
C	64	Scott Wells	Sr

Defense

Pos.	#	Name	Class
LB	2	Kevin Burnett	Jr
DB	8	Gibril Wilson	Sr
LB	44	Omar Gaither	So

Special teams

Pos.	#	Name	Class
P	47	Dustin Colquitt	Jr

Head coach

- Phillip Fulmer

Coordinators/assistant coaches

- Randy Sanders – Offensive coordinator/quarterbacks
- Woody McCorvey – Running backs
- Pat Washington – Wide receivers
- Greg Adkins – Tight ends/assistant offensive line/recruiting coordinator
- Jimmy Ray Stephens – Offensive line
- John Chavis – Defensive coordinator/linebackers
- Dan Brooks – Defensive line
- Larry Slade – Defensive backs
- Steve Caldwell – Special teams/defensive ends
- Shane Beamer – Graduate assistant
- Marcus Satterfield – Graduate assistant

Legend

- (C) Team captain
- (S) Suspended
- (I) Ineligible
- Injured
- Redshirt

Roster

== Team players drafted into the NFL ==
Player	Position	Round	Pick	NFL club
Gibril Wilson	Safety	5	136	New York Giants
Troy Fleming	Fullback	6	191	Tennessee Titans
Mark Jones	Wide receiver	7	206	Tampa Bay Buccaneers
Scott Wells	Guard	7	251	Green Bay Packers
