= Daniel Francis (American football) =

American football player (born 1984)

No. 35, 19
- Position: Defensive back

Personal information
- Born: September 9, 1984 (age 42); Lafayette, Louisiana, U.S.
- Listed height: 5 ft 11 in (1.80 m)
- Listed weight: 175 lb (79 kg)

Career information
- High school: Port Barre (LA)
- College: Louisiana State
- NFL draft: 2007: undrafted

Career history
- 2007: Washington Redskins*
- 2009–2010: Saskatchewan Roughriders
- 2011: Hamilton Tiger-Cats
- * Offseason or practice squad member only

Awards and highlights
- BCS national champion (2003)

Daniel James Francis (born September 9, 1984) is an American former professional football defensive back. He was signed by the Washington Redskins as an undrafted free agent in 2007. He played college football for the LSU Tigers.
