= 2003 NCAA Division I-A football rankings =

- Season: 2003
- Bowl season: 2003–04 bowl games
- Preseason No. 1: Oklahoma
- End of season champions: USC (AP); LSU (Coaches)
- Conference with most teams in final AP poll: Big 10, SEC (5)

Two human polls and one formulaic ranking make up the 2003 NCAA Division I-A football rankings. Unlike most sports, college football's governing body, the National Collegiate Athletic Association (NCAA), does not bestow a National Championship title for Division I-A football. That title is primarily bestowed by different polling agencies. There are several polls that currently exist. The main weekly polls are the AP Poll and Coaches Poll. About halfway through the season the Bowl Championship Series (BCS) standings are released.

== Legend ==
	Increase in ranking
	Decrease in ranking
	Not ranked previous week
	Selected for BCS National Championship Game
(#–#)	Win–loss record
(Italics)	Number of first place votes
т	Tied with team above or below also with this symbol

== AP Poll ==
	Preseason	Week 1 Sep 1	Week 2 Sep 7	Week 3 Sep 14	Week 4 Sep 21	Week 5 Sep 28	Week 6 Oct 5	Week 7 Oct 12	Week 8 Oct 19	Week 9 Oct 26	Week 10 Nov 2	Week 11 Nov 9	Week 12 Nov 16	Week 13 Nov 23	Week 14 Nov 30	Week 15 Dec 7	Week 16 (Final) Jan 5	
1.	Oklahoma (32)	Oklahoma (1–0) (30)	Oklahoma (2–0) (47)	Oklahoma (3–0) (50)	Oklahoma (4–0) (55)	Oklahoma (4–0) (57)	Oklahoma (5–0) (59)	Oklahoma (6–0) (61)	Oklahoma (7–0) (62)	Oklahoma (8–0) (62)	Oklahoma (9–0) (65)	Oklahoma (10–0) (65)	Oklahoma (11–0) (65)	Oklahoma (12–0) (65)	Oklahoma (12–0) (65)	USC (11–1) (42)	USC (12–1) (48)	1.
2.	Ohio State (27)	Ohio State (1–0) (25)	Miami (FL) (2–0) (2)	Miami (FL) (3–0) (3)	Miami (FL) (4–0) (3)	Miami (FL) (4–0) (3)	Miami (FL) (5–0) (1)	Miami (FL) (6–0) (3)	Miami (FL) (7–0) (3)	Miami (FL) (7–0) (3)	USC (8–1)	USC (8–1)	USC (9–1)	USC (10–1)	USC (10–1)	LSU (12–1) (21)	LSU (13–1) (17)	2.
3.	Miami (FL) (2)	Miami (FL) (1–0) (2)	Ohio State (2–0) (8)	Michigan (3–0) (4)	USC (3–0) (2)	Ohio State (5–0) (5)	Ohio State (5–0) (5)	Virginia Tech (6–0)	Virginia Tech (6–0)	USC (7–1)	Florida State (8–1)	LSU (8–1)	LSU (9–1)	LSU (10–1)	LSU (11–1)	Oklahoma (12–1) (2)	Oklahoma (12–2)	3.
4.	Michigan (2)	USC (1–0) (6)	USC (2–0) (4)	USC (3–0) (2)	Ohio State (4–0) (5)	Virginia Tech (4–0)	Virginia Tech (5–0)	Georgia (5–1)	Georgia (6–1)	Georgia (7–1)	LSU (8–1)	Ohio State (9–1)	Ohio State (10–1)	Michigan (10–2)	Michigan (10–2)	Michigan (10–2)	Ohio State (11–2)	4.
5.	Texas	Michigan (1–0) (2)	Michigan (2–0) (2)	Ohio State (3–0) (6)	Virginia Tech (3–0)	Florida State (5–0)	Florida State (5–0)	USC (5–1)	USC (6–1)	Florida State (7–1)	Virginia Tech (7–1)	Michigan (8–2)	Michigan (9–2)	Georgia (9–2)	Georgia (10–2)	Texas (10–2)	Miami (FL) (11–2)	5.
6.	Auburn (1)	Texas (1–0)	Texas (2–0)	Kansas State (4–0)	Florida State (4–0)	LSU (5–0)	LSU (5–0)	Washington State (5–1)	Florida State (6–1)	Washington State (7–1)	Miami (FL) (7–1)	Texas (8–2)	Georgia (8–2)	Texas (9–2)	Texas (10–2)	Tennessee (10–2)	Michigan (10–3)	6.
7.	Kansas State (1)	Kansas State (2–0)	Kansas State (3–0)	Georgia (3–0)	LSU (4–0)	Tennessee (4–0)	Arkansas (4–0)	Florida State (5–1)	Washington State (6–1)	LSU (7–1)	Ohio State (8–1)	Georgia (7–2)	Texas (9–2)	Tennessee (9–2)	Tennessee (10–2)	Ohio State (10–2)	Georgia (11–3)	7.
8.	USC	Georgia (1–0)	Georgia (2–0)	Virginia Tech (2–0)	Tennessee (3–0)	Arkansas (4–0)	Georgia (4–1)	Ohio State (5–1)	Ohio State (6–1)	Ohio State (7–1)	Michigan (8–2)	Washington State (8–2)	Washington State (9–2)	Ohio State (10–2)	Ohio State (10–2)	Kansas State (11–3)	Iowa (10–3)	8.
9.	Virginia Tech	Virginia Tech (1–0)	Virginia Tech (2–0)	Pittsburgh (2–0)	Arkansas (3–0)	Michigan (4–1)	USC (4–1)	Iowa (5–1)	LSU (6–1)	Michigan State (7–1)	Georgia (7–2)	Tennessee (7–2)	Tennessee (8–2)	Florida State (9–2)	Florida State (10–2)	Florida State (10–2)	Washington State (10–3)	9.
10.	Pittsburgh	Pittsburgh (0–0)	Florida State (2–0)	Florida State (3–0)	Oregon (4–0)	USC (3–1)	Nebraska (5–0)	LSU (5–1)	Purdue (6–1)	Virginia Tech (6–1)	Iowa (7–2)	TCU (9–0)	TCU (10–0)	Miami (FL) (9–2)	Miami (FL) (10–2)	Miami (FL) (10–2)	Miami (OH) (13–1)	10.
11.	Georgia	Florida State (1–0)	Pittsburgh (2–0)	LSU (3–0)	Michigan (3–1)	Georgia (3–1)	Texas (4–1)	Arkansas (4–1)	Michigan State (7–1)	Michigan (7–2)	Texas (7–2)	Purdue (8–2)	Florida State (9–2)	Florida (8–3)	Purdue (9–3)	Georgia (10–3)	Florida State (10–3)	11.
12.	Tennessee	Tennessee (1–0)	LSU (1–0)	Tennessee (2–0)	Georgia (3–1)	Nebraska (4–0)	Washington State (5–1)	Northern Illinois (6–0)	Northern Illinois (7–0)	Nebraska (7–1)	Washington State (7–2)	Virginia Tech (7–2)	Virginia Tech (8–2)	Purdue (9–3)	Iowa (9–3)	Purdue (9–3)	Texas (10–3)	12.
13.	Florida State	LSU (1–0)	Tennessee (2–0)	Texas (1–1)	Iowa (4–0)	Texas (3–1)	Tennessee (4–1)	Purdue (5–1)	Michigan (6–2)	Iowa (6–2)	TCU (8–0)	Florida State (8–2)	Florida (8–3)	Iowa (9–3)	Kansas State (10–3)	Iowa (9–3)	Ole Miss (10–3)	13.
14.	LSU	NC State (1–0)	Wisconsin (1–0)	Arkansas (2–0)	Texas (2–1)	Washington State (4–1)	Iowa (5–1)	Wisconsin (6–1)	Nebraska (6–1)	Oklahoma State (7–1)	Michigan State (7–2)	Miami (FL) (7–2)	Miami (FL) (8–2)	Kansas State (10–3)	Miami (OH) (11–1)	Miami (OH) (12–1)	Kansas State (11–4)	14.
15.	Maryland	Virginia (1–0)	Notre Dame (1–0)	Nebraska (3–0)	Nebraska (3–0)	Pittsburgh (3–1)	Pittsburgh (3–1)	Michigan State (6–1)	TCU (7–0)	TCU (8–0)	Bowling Green (7–1)	Florida (6–3)	Ole Miss (8–2)	Miami (OH) (10–1)	Washington State (9–3)	Washington State (9–3)	Tennessee (10–3)	15.
16.	NC State	Purdue (0–0)	Arizona State (1–0)	Arizona State (2–0)	Kansas State (4–1)	Kansas State (4–1)	Northern Illinois (5–0)	TCU (6–0)	Iowa (5–2)	Texas (6–2)	Purdue (7–2)	Pittsburgh (7–2)	Purdue (8–3)	Washington State (9–3)	Florida (8–4)	Ole Miss (9–3)	Boise State (13–1)	16.
17.	Washington	Auburn (0–1)	Colorado (2–0)	Florida (2–1)	Pittsburgh (2–1)	Northern Illinois (4–0)	Minnesota (6–0)	Michigan (5–2)	Auburn (5–2)	Bowling Green (7–1)	Florida (6–3)	Ole Miss (8–2)	Iowa (8–3)	Ole Miss (8–3)	Ole Miss (9–3)	Florida (8–4)	Maryland (10–3)	17.
18.	Virginia	Wisconsin (1–0)	Nebraska (2–0)	Iowa (3–0)	Washington (2–1)	Washington (3–1)	Purdue (4–1)	Auburn (4–2)	Oklahoma State (6–1)	Purdue (6–2)	Tennessee (6–2)	Nebraska (8–2)	Miami (OH) (9–1)	Boise State (10–1)	Boise State (11–1)	Boise State (12–1)	Purdue (9–4)	18.
19.	Purdue	Notre Dame (0–0)	Wake Forest (2–0)	Washington (1–1)	TCU (3–0)	Oregon (4–1)	TCU (5–0)	Nebraska (5–1)	Texas (5–2)	Tennessee (5–2)	Nebraska (7–2)	Minnesota (9–2)	Kansas State (9–3)	TCU (10–1)	TCU (11–1)	TCU (11–1)	Nebraska (10–3)	19.
20.	Notre Dame	Arizona State (0–0)	Florida (2–0)	TCU (2–0)	Northern Illinois (3–0)	TCU (4–0)	Michigan (4–2)	Texas (4–2)	Wisconsin (6–2)	Ole Miss (6–2)	Ole Miss (7–2)	Iowa (7–3)	Boise State (9–1)	Pittsburgh (8–3)	Bowling Green (10–2)	West Virginia (8–4)	Minnesota (10–3)	20.
21.	Wisconsin	Florida (1–0)	Washington (1–1)	Alabama (2–1)	Washington State (3–1)	Minnesota (5–0)	Michigan State (5–1)	Tennessee (4–2)	Arkansas (4–2)	Missouri (6–2)	Oklahoma State (7–2)	Michigan State (7–3)	Pittsburgh (7–3)	Virginia Tech (8–3)	West Virginia (8–4)	Oklahoma State (9–3)	Utah (10–2)	21.
22.	Arizona State	Washington (0–1)	TCU (2–0)	Oregon (3–0)	Purdue (2–1)	Purdue (3–1)	Kansas State (4–2)	Oregon State (5–1)	Tennessee (4–2)	Northern Illinois (7–1)	Missouri (6–2)	Northern Illinois (9–1)	Bowling Green (8–2)	Bowling Green (9–2)	Oklahoma State (9–3)	Nebraska (9–3)	Clemson (9–4)	22.
23.	Colorado State	Nebraska (1–0)	Iowa (2–0)	Missouri (3–0)	Missouri (4–0)	Iowa (4–1)	Wisconsin (5–1)	Oklahoma State (5–1)	Bowling Green (6–1)	Florida (5–3)	Northern Illinois (8–1)	Miami (OH) (8–1)	Nebraska (8–3)	Oklahoma State (9–3)	Nebraska (9–3)	Maryland (9–3)	Bowling Green (11–3)	23.
24.	Oklahoma State	Colorado (1–0)	NC State (1–1)	Washington State (2–1)	Minnesota (4–0)	Florida (3–2)	Oregon State (5–1)	Missouri (5–1)	Utah (6–1)	Minnesota (7–2)	Minnesota (8–2)	Boise State (8–1)	Oklahoma State (8–3)	West Virginia (7–4)	Maryland (9–3)	Minnesota (9–3)	Florida (8–5)	24.
25.	TCU	TCU (0–0)	South Carolina (2–0)	Purdue (1–1)	Florida (2–2)	Michigan State (4–1)	Virginia (4–1)	Minnesota (6–1)	Florida (5–3)	Pittsburgh (5–2)	Pittsburgh (6–2)	Bowling Green (7–2)	West Virginia (6–4)	Nebraska (8–3)	Minnesota (9–3)	Utah (9–2)	TCU (11–2)	25.
	Preseason	Week 1 Sep 1	Week 2 Sep 7	Week 3 Sep 14	Week 4 Sep 21	Week 5 Sep 28	Week 6 Oct 5	Week 7 Oct 12	Week 8 Oct 19	Week 9 Oct 26	Week 10 Nov 2	Week 11 Nov 9	Week 12 Nov 16	Week 13 Nov 23	Week 14 Nov 30	Week 15 Dec 7	Week 16 (Final) Jan 5	
		Dropped: Maryland; Colorado State; Oklahoma State	Dropped: Virginia; Purdue; Auburn	Dropped: Wisconsin; Notre Dame; Colorado; Wake Forest; NC State; South Carolina	Dropped: Arizona State; Alabama	Dropped: Missouri	Dropped: Washington; Oregon; Florida	Dropped: Pittsburgh; Kansas State; Virginia	Dropped: Oregon State; Missouri; Minnesota	Dropped: Auburn; Wisconsin; Arkansas; Utah	None	Dropped: Oklahoma State; Missouri	Dropped: Minnesota; Michigan State; Northern Illinois	None	Dropped: Pittsburgh; Virginia Tech	Dropped: Bowling Green	Dropped: West Virginia; Oklahoma State	

== Coaches Poll ==
	Preseason	Week 1 Aug 24	Week 2 Sep 1	Week 3 Sep 7	Week 4 Sep 14	Week 5 Sep 21	Week 6 Sep 28	Week 7 Oct 5	Week 8 Oct 12	Week 9 Oct 19	Week 10 Oct 26	Week 11 Nov 2	Week 12 Nov 9	Week 13 Nov 16	Week 14 Nov 23	Week 15 Nov 30	Week 16 Dec 7	Week 17 (Final) Jan 5	
1.	Oklahoma (29)	Oklahoma (0–0) (37)	Oklahoma (1–0) (32)	Oklahoma (2–0) (41)	Oklahoma (3–0) (46)	Oklahoma (4–0) (51)	Oklahoma (4–0) (49)	Oklahoma (5–0) (53)	Oklahoma (6–0) (58)	Oklahoma (7–0) (57)	Oklahoma (8–0) (58)	Oklahoma (9–0) (63)	Oklahoma (10–0) (63)	Oklahoma (11–0) (63)	Oklahoma (12–0) (63)	Oklahoma (12–0) (63)	USC (11–1) (37)	LSU (13–1) (60)	1.
2.	Ohio State (28)	Ohio State (0–0) (23)	Ohio State (1–0) (26)	Miami (FL) (2–0) (8)	Miami (FL) (3–0) (8)	Miami (FL) (4–0) (6)	Miami (FL) (4–0) (8)	Miami (FL) (5–0) (4)	Miami (FL) (6–0) (5)	Miami (FL) (7–0) (6)	Miami (FL) (6–0) (5)	USC (7–1)	USC (8–1)	USC (9–1)	USC (10–1)	USC (10–1)	LSU (12–1) (18)	USC (12–1) (3)	2.
3.	Miami (FL) (5)	Miami (FL) (0–0) (2)	Miami (FL) (1–0) (5)	Ohio State (2–0) (13)	USC (3–0) (1)	USC (3–0) (1)	Ohio State (5–0) (6)	Ohio State (5–0) (6)	Virginia Tech (6–0)	Virginia Tech (6–0)	USC (7–1)	Florida State (8–1)	LSU (8–1)	LSU (9–1)	LSU (10–1)	LSU (11–1)	Oklahoma (12–1) (8)	Oklahoma (12–2)	3.
4.	Texas	Texas (0–0)	Texas (1–0)	USC (2–0) (1)	Ohio State (3–0) (7)	Ohio State (4–0) (5)	Virginia Tech (4–0)	Virginia Tech (5–0)	USC (5–1)	USC (6–1)	Georgia (6–1)	LSU (8–1)	Ohio State (9–1)	Ohio State (10–1)	Michigan (10–2)	Michigan (10–2)	Michigan (10–2)	Ohio State (11–2)	4.
5.	Kansas State	Kansas State (1–0)	USC (1–0)	Texas (1–0)	Michigan (3–0) (1)	Virginia Tech (3–0)	Florida State (5–0)	Florida State (5–0)	Georgia (5–1)	Georgia (6–1)	Florida State (7–1)	Virginia Tech (7–1)	Michigan (8–2)	Michigan (9–2)	Georgia (9–2)	Georgia (10–2)	Texas (10–2)	Miami (FL) (11–2)	5.
6.	Auburn (1)	Auburn (0–0) (1)	Kansas State (2–0)	Kansas State (3–0)	Kansas State (4–0)	Florida State (4–0)	LSU (5–0)	LSU (5–0)	Washington State (5–1)	Washington State (6–1)	Washington State (7–1)	Ohio State (8–1)	Georgia (7–2)	Georgia (8–2)	Texas (9–2)	Texas (10–2)	Ohio State (10–2)	Georgia (11–3)	6.
7.	Michigan	Michigan (0–0)	Michigan (1–0)	Michigan (2–0)	Georgia (3–0)	LSU (4–0)	Tennessee (4–0)	Nebraska (5–0)	Florida State (5–1)	Florida State (6–1)	Ohio State (7–1)	Miami (FL) (6–1)	Texas (8–2)	Texas (9–2)	Ohio State (10–2)	Ohio State (10–2)	Tennessee (10–2)	Michigan (10–3)	7.
8.	USC	USC (0–0)	Georgia (1–0)	Georgia (2–0)	Virginia Tech (2–0)	Tennessee (3–0)	Nebraska (4–0)	Arkansas (4–0)	Ohio State (5–1)	Ohio State (6–1)	LSU (7–1)	Michigan (8–2)	Washington State (8–2)	Washington State (9–2)	Tennessee (9–2)	Tennessee (10–2)	Florida State (10–2)	Iowa (10–3)	8.
9.	Georgia	Georgia (0–0)	Virginia Tech (1–0)	Virginia Tech (2–0)	Florida State (3–0)	Iowa (4–0)	Arkansas (4–0)	USC (4–1)	Iowa (5–1)	LSU (6–1)	Nebraska (6–1)	Georgia (6–2)	TCU (9–0)	TCU (10–0)	Florida State (9–2)	Florida State (10–2)	Miami (FL) (10–2)	Washington State (10–3)	9.
10.	Virginia Tech	Virginia Tech (0–0)	Florida State (1–0)	Florida State (2–0)	LSU (3–0)	Michigan (3–1)	USC (3–1)	Georgia (4–1)	LSU (5–1)	Purdue (6–1)	Michigan State (6–1)	Iowa (7–2)	Purdue (8–2)	Florida State (9–2)	Miami (FL) (9–2)	Miami (FL) (10–2)	Kansas State (11–3)	Florida State (10–3)	10.
11.	Pittsburgh	Florida State (0–0)	NC State (1–0)	LSU (2–0)	Pittsburgh (2–0)	Nebraska (3–0)	Michigan (4–1)	Texas (4–1)	Arkansas (4–1)	Nebraska (6–1)	Virginia Tech (6–1)	Texas (6–2)	Florida State (8–2)	Tennessee (8–2)	Florida (8–3)	Iowa (9–3)	Georgia (10–3)	Texas (10–3)	11.
12.	Florida State	Pittsburgh (0–0)	Pittsburgh (0–0)	Pittsburgh (1–0)	Tennessee (2–0)	Georgia (3–1)	Georgia (3–1)	Washington State (5–1)	Wisconsin (6–1)	Michigan State (7–1)	Michigan (6–2)	TCU (8–0)	Virginia Tech (7–2)	Virginia Tech (7–2)	Iowa (9–3)	Purdue (9–3)	Iowa (9–3)	Miami (OH) (13–1)	12.
13.	Maryland	NC State (0–0)	LSU (1–0)	Tennessee (2–0)	Texas (1–1)	Texas (2–1)	Texas (3–1)	Minnesota (6–0)	TCU (6–0)	TCU (7–0)	TCU (8–0)	Washington State (7–2)	Tennessee (7–2)	Miami (FL) (8–2)	Purdue (9–3)	Kansas State (10–3)	Purdue (9–3)	Kansas State (11–4)	13.
14.	NC State	Maryland (0–0)	Tennessee (1–0)	Notre Dame (1–0)	Iowa (3–0)	Arkansas (3–0)	Kansas State (4–1)	Tennessee (4–1)	Nebraska (5–1)	Northern Illinois (7–0)	Iowa (6–2)	Purdue (6–2)	Miami (FL) (7–2)	Florida (8–3)	Washington State (9–3)	Washington State (9–3)	Washington State (9–3)	Ole Miss(10–3)	14.
15.	LSU	LSU (0–0)	Virginia (1–0)	Wisconsin (2–0)	Nebraska (3–0)	Oregon (4–0)	Washington State (4–1)	Iowa (5–1)	Purdue (5–1)	Michigan (6–2)	Oklahoma State (7–1)	Michigan State (6–2)	Nebraska (8–2)	Ole Miss (8–2)	Kansas State (10–3)	Miami (OH) (11–1)	Miami (OH) (12–1)	Boise State (13–1)	15.
16.	Tennessee	Tennessee (0–0)	Notre Dame (0–0)	Arizona State (1–0)	Arizona State (2–0)	Kansas State (4–1)	Minnesota (5–0)	Pittsburgh (3–1)	Northern Illinois (6–0)	Iowa (5–2)	Texas (5–2)	Nebraska (6–2)	Pittsburgh (7–2)	Purdue (8–3)	Miami (OH)	Florida (8–4)	Boise State (12–1)	Tennessee (10–3)	16.
17.	Virginia	Virginia (0–0)	Wisconsin (1–0)	Colorado (2–0)	Florida (2–1)	TCU (3–0)	Washington (3–1)	TCU (5–0)	Michigan (5–2)	Wisconsin (6–2)	Purdue (5–2)	Tennessee (6–2)	Minnesota (9–2)	Iowa (8–3)	TCU (10–1)	Boise State (11–1)	Florida (8–4)	Minnesota (10–3)	17.
18.	Notre Dame	Notre Dame (0–0)	Florida (1–0)	Nebraska (2–0)	Arkansas (2–0)	Washington (2–1)	Pittsburgh (3–1)	Northern Illinois (5–0)	Michigan State (6–1)	Texas (5–2)	Tennessee (5–2)	Minnesota (7–2)	Florida (7–3)	Kansas State (9–3)	Boise State (10–1)	Ole Miss (9–3)	Ole Miss (9–3)	Nebraska (10–3)	18.
19.	Washington	Washington (0–0)	Auburn (0–1)	Iowa (2–0)	TCU (2–0)	Pittsburgh (2–1)	Iowa (4–1)	Michigan (4–2)	Minnesota (6–1)	Oklahoma State (6–1)	Minnesota (6–2)	Florida (6–3)	Ole Miss (8–2)	Miami (OH) (9–1)	Ole Miss (8–3)	TCU (11–1)	TCU (11–1)	Purdue (9–4)	19.
20.	Wisconsin	Wisconsin (0–0)	Purdue (0–0)	Florida (1–1)	Texas A&M (2–0)	Minnesota (4–0)	Northern Illinois (4–0)	Purdue (4–1)	Texas (4–2)	Arkansas (4–2)	Bowling Green (7–1)	Bowling Green (7–1)	Iowa (7–3)	Boise State (9–1)	Virginia Tech (8–3)	Minnesota (9–3)	Minnesota (9–3)	Maryland (10–3)	20.
21.	Florida	Florida (0–0)	Arizona State (0–0)	Wake Forest (2–0)	Washington (1–1)	Washington State (3–1)	TCU (4–0)	Kansas State (4–2)	Oregon State (5–1)	Auburn (4–2)	Florida (5–3)	Pittsburgh (5–2)	Northern Illinois (9–1)	Minnesota (9–3)	Pittsburgh (8–3)	Nebraska (9–3)	Nebraska (9–3)	Utah (10–2)	21.
22.	Purdue	Purdue (0–0)	Colorado (1–0)	NC State (1–1)	Oregon (3–0)	Northern Illinois (3–0)	Oregon (4–1)	Wisconsin (5–1)	Tennessee (4–2)	Tennessee (4–2)	Northern Illinois (7–1)	Oklahoma State (7–2)	Michigan State (7–3)	Pittsburgh (7–3)	Minnesota (9–3)	Oklahoma State (9–3)	Oklahoma State (9–3)	Clemson (9–4)	22.
23.	Arizona State	Arizona State (0–0)	Iowa (1–0)	TCU (2–0)	Notre Dame (1–1)	Missouri(4–0)	Purdue (3–1)	Michigan State (5–1)	Texas Tech (5–1)	Utah	Pittsburgh (4–2)	Northern Illinois (8–1)	Boise State (8–1)	Nebraska (8–3)	Nebraska (8–3)	Bowling Green (10–2)	West Virginia (8–4)	Bowling Green (11–3)	23.
24.	Oklahoma State	Oklahoma State (0–0)	Nebraska (1–0)	Washington (1–1)	Minnesota (3–0)	Arizona State (2–1)	Florida (3–2)	Virginia (4–1)	Oklahoma State (5–1)	Minnesota (6–2)	Missouri (6–2)	Ole Miss (7–2)	Miami (OH) (8–1)	Oklahoma State (7–3)	Oklahoma State (9–3)	West Virginia (8–4)	Maryland (9–3)	TCU (11–2)	24.
25.	Penn State т; Colorado State т	Iowa (0–0)	Penn State (1–0)	Texas A&M (2–0)	Washington State (2–1)	Florida (2–2)	Air Force (5–0)	Oregon State (5–1)	Auburn (4–4)	Florida (5–3)	Louisville (7–1)	Louisville (7–1)	Kansas State (8–3)	Bowling Green (8–2)	Bowling Green (9–2)	Maryland (9–3)	Utah (9–2)	Florida (8–5)	25.
	Preseason	Week 1 Aug 24	Week 2 Sep 1	Week 3 Sep 7	Week 4 Sep 14	Week 5 Sep 21	Week 6 Sep 28	Week 7 Oct 5	Week 8 Oct 12	Week 9 Oct 19	Week 10 Oct 26	Week 11 Nov 2	Week 12 Nov 9	Week 13 Nov 16	Week 14 Nov 23	Week 15 Nov 30	Week 16 Dec 7	Week 17 (Final) Jan 5	
		Dropped: Colorado State; Penn State	Dropped: Maryland; Washington; Oklahoma State	Dropped: Virginia; Auburn; Purdue	Dropped: Wisconsin; Colorado; Wake Forest	Dropped: Texas A&M; Notre Dame	Dropped: Missouri; Arizona State	Dropped: Washington; Oregon; Florida; Air Force	Dropped: Pittsburgh; Kansas State; Virginia	Dropped: Oregon State; Texas Tech	Dropped: Wisconsin; Arkansas; Auburn; Utah	Dropped: Missouri	Dropped: Bowling Green; Oklahoma State	Dropped: Northern Illinois; Michigan State	None	Dropped: Virginia Tech; Pittsburgh	Dropped: Bowling Green	Dropped: Oklahoma State; West Virginia	

== BCS standings ==
The Bowl Championship Series (BCS) determined the two teams that competed in the BCS National Championship Game, the 2004 Sugar Bowl.

	Week 8 Oct 20	Week 9 Oct 27	Week 10 Nov 3	Week 11 Nov 10	Week 12 Nov 17	Week 13 Nov 24	Week 14 Dec 1	Week 15 (Final) Dec 7	
1.	Oklahoma (7–0)	Oklahoma (8–0)	Oklahoma (9–0)	Oklahoma (10–0)	Oklahoma (11–0)	Oklahoma (12–0)	Oklahoma (12–0)	Oklahoma (12–1)	1.
2.	Miami (FL) (7–0)	Miami (FL) (7–0)	USC (8–1)	USC (8–1)	Ohio State (10–1)	USC (10–1)	USC (10–1)	LSU (12–1)	2.
3.	Virginia Tech (6–0)	Florida State (7–1)	Florida State (8–1)	Ohio State (9–1)	USC (9–1)	LSU (10–1)	LSU (11–1)	USC (11–1)	3.
4.	Georgia (6–1)	USC (7–1)	Miami (FL) (7–1)	LSU (8–1)	LSU (9–1)	Michigan (10–2)	Michigan (10–2)	Michigan (10–2)	4.
5.	Florida State (6–1)	Georgia (7–1)	Ohio State (8–1)	Texas (8–2)	Texas (9–2)	Ohio State (10–2)	Ohio State (10–2)	Ohio State (10–2)	5.
6.	Ohio State (6–1)	Ohio State (7–1)	Virginia Tech (7–1)	TCU (9–0)	Georgia (8–2)	Texas (9–2)	Texas (10–2)	Texas (10–2)	6.
7.	USC (6–1)	LSU (7–1)	LSU (8–1)	Tennessee (7–2)	Tennessee (8–2)	Georgia (9–2)	Georgia (10–2)	Florida State (10–2)	7.
8.	Purdue (6–1)	Washington State (7–1)	Michigan (8–2)	Michigan (8–2)	TCU (10–0)	Tennessee (9–2)	Florida State (10–2)	Tennessee (10–2)	8.
9.	Washington State (6–1)	Nebraska (7–1)	TCU (8–0)	Georgia (7–2)	Michigan (9–2)	Florida State (9–2)	Tennessee (10–2)	Miami (FL) (10–2)	9.
10.	Northern Illinois (7–0)	Michigan State (7–1)	Georgia (7–2)	Washington State (8–2)	Washington State (9–2)	Miami (FL) (9–2)	Miami (FL) (10–2)	Kansas State (11–3)	10.
11.	Nebraska (6–1)	Iowa (6–2)	Iowa (7–2)	Purdue (8–2)	Florida State (9–2)	Florida (8–3)	Miami (OH) (11–1)	Miami (OH) (11–1)	11.
12.	LSU (6–1)	TCU (8–0)	Texas (7–2)	Miami (FL) (7–2)	Miami (FL) (8–2)	Iowa (9–3)	Iowa (9–3)	Georgia (10–3)	12.
13.	Michigan State (7–1)	Michigan (7–2)	Tennessee (6–2)	Florida State (8–2)	Florida (8–3)	Miami (OH) (10–1)	Purdue (9–3)	Iowa (9–3)	13.
14.	TCU (7–0)	Oklahoma State (7–1)	Purdue (7–2)	Florida (6–3)	Miami (OH) (9–1)	Purdue (9–3)	Florida (8–4)	Purdue (9–3)	14.
15.	Iowa (5–2)	Tennessee (5–2)	Washington State (7–2)	Virginia Tech (7–2)	Ole Miss (8–2)	Washington State (9–3)	Kansas State (10–3)	Florida (8–4)	15.
16.	—	Virginia Tech (6–1)	Bowling Green (7–1)	Miami (OH) (8–1)	Purdue (8–3)	Kansas State (10–3)	Washington State (9–3)	Washington State (9–3)	16.
17.	—	Bowling Green (7–1)	Florida (6–3)	Nebraska (8–2)	Virginia Tech (8–2)	TCU (10–1)	TCU (11–1)	Boise State (12–1)	17.
18.	—	Purdue (6–2)	Nebraska (7–2)	Ole Miss (8–2)	Iowa (8–3)	Ole Miss (8–3)	Bowling Green (10–2)	TCU (11–1)	18.
19.	—	Miami (OH) (7–1)	Oklahoma State (7–2)	Pittsburgh (7–2)	Kansas State (9–3)	Boise State (10–1)	Boise State (11–1)	Ole Miss (9–3)	19.
20.	—	Missouri (6–2)	Michigan State (7–2)	Iowa (7–3)	Bowling Green (8–2)	Bowling Green (9–2)	Ole Miss (9–3)	Nebraska (9–3)	20.
21.	—	Florida (5–3)	Miami (OH) (7–1)	Northern Illinois (9–1)	Oklahoma State (8–3)	Oklahoma State (9–3)	Nebraska (9–3)	Oklahoma State (9–3)	21.
22.	—	Texas (6–2)	Northern Illinois (8–1)	Minnesota (9–2)	Nebraska (8–3)	Utah (9–2)	Oklahoma State (9–3)	Utah (9–2)	22.
23.	—	Northern Illinois (7–1)	Ole Miss (7–2)	Bowling Green (7–2)	Boise State (9–1)	Nebraska (8–3)	Utah (9–2)	Maryland (9–3)	23.
24.	—	Minnesota (7–2)	Missouri (6–2)	Michigan State (7–3)	Utah (8–2)	Arkansas (8–3)	Maryland (9–3)	Bowling Green (10–3)	24.
25.	—	UCLA (6–2)	Pittsburgh (6–2)	Oklahoma State (7–3)	Pittsburgh (7–3)	Pittsburgh (8–3)	Minnesota (9–3)	Minnesota (9–3)	25.
