= 2003 Kansas State Wildcats football team =

American college football season

2003 Kansas State Wildcats football

Big 12 champion Big 12 North champion

Big 12 Championship Game, W 35–7 vs. Oklahoma

Fiesta Bowl, L 28–35 vs. Ohio State
- Conference: Big 12 Conference
- North

Ranking
- Coaches: No. 13
- AP: No. 14
- Record: 11–4 (6–2 Big 12)
- Head coach: Bill Snyder (15th season)
- Co-offensive coordinators: Del Miller (7th season); Greg Peterson (1st season)
- Offensive scheme: Spread
- Co-defensive coordinators: Bret Bielema (2nd season); Bob Elliott (2nd season)
- Base defense: 4–3
- Home stadium: KSU Stadium

2003 Big 12 Conference football standings
| | Conf. | | | Overall |
| Team | W | | L | W | | L |
|---|---|---|---|---|---|---|
North Division
| No. 14 Kansas State x$ | 6 | – | 2 | 11 | – | 4 |
| No. 19 Nebraska | 5 | – | 3 | 10 | – | 3 |
| Missouri | 4 | – | 4 | 8 | – | 5 |
| Kansas | 3 | – | 5 | 6 | – | 7 |
| Colorado | 3 | – | 5 | 5 | – | 7 |
| Iowa State | 0 | – | 8 | 2 | – | 10 |
South Division
| No. 3 Oklahoma x% | 8 | – | 0 | 12 | – | 2 |
| No. 12 Texas | 7 | – | 1 | 10 | – | 3 |
| Oklahoma State | 5 | – | 3 | 9 | – | 4 |
| Texas Tech | 4 | – | 4 | 8 | – | 5 |
| Texas A&M | 2 | – | 6 | 4 | – | 8 |
| Baylor | 1 | – | 7 | 3 | – | 9 |
Championship: Kansas State 35, Oklahoma 7
$ – BCS representative as conference champion; % – BCS at-large representative; x – Division champion/co-champions; Rankings from AP Poll

The 2003 Kansas State Wildcats football team represented Kansas State University in the 2003 NCAA Division I-A football season. The team's head coach was Bill Snyder. The Wildcats played their home games in KSU Stadium. The team finished the season with a win–loss record of 11 wins and 4 losses, and a Big 12 Conference record of 6 wins and 2 losses. They notched a stunning 35–7 victory over the #1 ranked Oklahoma Sooners in the Big 12 Championship Game. With their 1st conference championship since 1934, they earned a berth in one of the Bowl Championship Series bowl games, the 2004 Fiesta Bowl, where they were defeated by the Ohio State Buckeyes, 35–28. The Wildcats played 15 games, most in school history.

During the 2002 and 2003 seasons teams were allowed to schedule 12 games as well as a kickoff game. As a result, Kansas State became only the second team in the modern era to play a 15-game schedule. The first was the 1996 BYU Cougars.

Running back Darren Sproles led the nation in rushing, and the Wildcats scored 549 points, good for third all-time at Kansas State.

Until 2022, this was the only season in college football history in which Kansas State, Kansas, and Missouri all played in a bowl game in the same season.

== Schedule ==
| Date | Time | Opponent | Rank | Site | TV | Result | Attendance |
|---|---|---|---|---|---|---|---|
| August 23 | 6:45 p.m. | vs. California* | No. 7 | Arrowhead Stadium; Kansas City, MO (BCA Classic) | ESPN | W 42–28 | 50,823 |
| August 30 | 6:10 p.m. | Troy State* | No. 7 | KSU Stadium; Manhattan, KS | | W 41–5 | 41,812 |
| September 6 | 6:10 p.m. | McNeese State* | No. 7 | KSU Stadium; Manhattan, KS | | W 55–14 | 44,544 |
| September 13 | 1:10 p.m. | UMass* | No. 7 | KSU Stadium; Manhattan, KS | | W 38–7 | 46,102 |
| September 20 | 11:40 a.m. | Marshall* | No. 6 | KSU Stadium; Manhattan, KS | FSN | L 20–27 | 46,700 |
| October 4 | 2:30 p.m. | at No. 13 Texas | No. 16 | Darrell K Royal–Texas Memorial Stadium; Austin, TX (College GameDay) | ABC | L 20–24 | 83,643 |
| October 11 | 11:30 a.m. | at Oklahoma State | No. 22 | Boone Pickens Stadium; Stillwater, OK | FSN | L 34–38 | 46,087 |
| October 18 | 1:10 p.m. | Colorado | | KSU Stadium; Manhattan, KS (rivalry) | | W 49–20 | 51,536 |
| October 25 | 1:10 p.m. | Kansas | | KSU Stadium; Manhattan, KS (rivalry) | | W 42–6 | 51,614 |
| November 1 | 1:10 p.m. | Baylor^{†} | | KSU Stadium; Manhattan, KS | | W 38–10 | 44,885 |
| November 8 | 1:00 p.m. | at Iowa State | | Jack Trice Stadium; Ames, IA (rivalry) | | W 45–0 | 40,124 |
| November 15 | 2:30 p.m. | at No. 18 Nebraska | | Memorial Stadium; Lincoln, NE (rivalry) | ABC | W 38–9 | 78,014 |
| November 22 | 6:10 p.m. | Missouri | No. 19 | KSU Stadium; Manhattan, KS | TBS | W 24–14 | 49,685 |
| December 6 | 7:00 p.m. | vs. No. 1 Oklahoma | No. 13 | Arrowhead Stadium; Kansas City, MO (Big 12 Championship Game) | ABC | W 35–7 | 79,451 |
| January 2 | 7:15 p.m. | vs. No. 7 Ohio State* | No. 8 | Sun Devil Stadium; Tempe, AZ (Fiesta Bowl) | ABC | L 28–35 | 73,425 |
*Non-conference game; ^{†}Homecoming; Rankings from AP Poll released prior to the game; All times are in Central time

== Rankings ==
Ranking movements Legend: ██ Increase in ranking ██ Decrease in ranking — = Not ranked ( ) = First-place votes
| | Week | | | | | | | | | | | | | | | | |
| Poll | Pre | 1 | 2 | 3 | 4 | 5 | 6 | 7 | 8 | 9 | 10 | 11 | 12 | 13 | 14 | 15 | Final |
|---|---|---|---|---|---|---|---|---|---|---|---|---|---|---|---|---|---|
| AP | 7 (1) | 7 | 7 | 7 | 6 | 16 | 16 | 22 | — | — | — | — | 19 | 14 | 13 | 8 | 14 |
| Coaches | 5 | 5 | 6 | 6 | 6 | 16 | 14 | 21 | — | — | — | 25 | 18 | 15 | 13 | 10 | 13 |
| BCS | Not released | | | | | | | | — | — | — | — | 19 | 16 | 15 | 10 | Not released |

== Game summaries ==
=== Vs. California ===
California vs. #7 Kansas State

| Team | 1 | 2 | 3 | 4 | Total |
|---|---|---|---|---|---|
| Golden Bears | 7 | 7 | 0 | 14 | 28 |
| • Wildcats | 10 | 17 | 8 | 7 | 42 |

- Date: August 23
- Location: Arrowhead Stadium, Kansas City, Missouri
- Game start: 6:45 p.m. CDT
- Game attendance: 50,823
- TV announcers (ESPN): Ron Franklin, Mike Gottfried, Adrian Karsten

Scoring summary
| 1 | 12:45 | KSU | Darren Sproles 5-yard run (Joe Rheem kick) | KSU 7–0 |
| 1 | 10:39 | Cal | Vincent Strang 34-yard pass from Reggie Robertson (Tyler Fredrickson kick) | Tied 7–7 |
| 1 | 6:29 | KSU | Joe Rheem 22-yard field goal | KSU 10–7 |
| 2 | 7:37 | KSU | Travis Wilson 5-yard pass from Ell Roberson (Rheem kick) | KSU 17–7 |
| 2 | 4:25 | KSU | Joe Rheem 37-yard field goal | KSU 20–7 |
| 2 | 3:54 | KSU | James Terry 52-yard pass from Ell Roberson (Rheem kick) | KSU 27–7 |
| 2 | 1:58 | Cal | Geoff McArthur 65-yard pass from Reggie Robertson (Fredrickson kick) | KSU 27–14 |
| 3 | 8:46 | KSU | Ell Roberson 11-yard run (Roberson run) | KSU 35–14 |
| 4 | 12:34 | Cal | J. J. Arrington 22-yard pass from Aaron Rodgers (Fredrickson kick) | KSU 35–21 |
| 4 | 10:14 | KSU | Davin Dennis 28-yard pass from Ell Roberson (Rheem kick) | KSU 42–21 |
| 4 | 4:27 | Cal | J. J. Arrington 7-yard pass from Reggie Robertson (Fredrickson kick) | KSU 42–28 |

=== Troy State ===
Troy State at #7 Kansas State

| Team | 1 | 2 | 3 | 4 | Total |
|---|---|---|---|---|---|
| Trojans | 5 | 0 | 0 | 0 | 5 |
| • Wildcats | 7 | 27 | 0 | 7 | 41 |

- Date: August 30
- Location: KSU Stadium, Manhattan, KS
- Game start: 6:10 p.m. CDT
- Game attendance: 41,812

=== McNeese State ===
McNeese State at #7 Kansas State

| Team | 1 | 2 | 3 | 4 | Total |
|---|---|---|---|---|---|
| Cowboys | 0 | 7 | 7 | 0 | 14 |
| • Wildcats | 24 | 7 | 7 | 17 | 55 |

- Date: September 6
- Location: KSU Stadium, Manhattan, KS
- Game start: 6:10 p.m. CDT
- Game attendance: 44,544

=== UMass ===
UMass at #7 Kansas State

| Team | 1 | 2 | 3 | 4 | Total |
|---|---|---|---|---|---|
| Minutemen | 7 | 0 | 0 | 0 | 7 |
| • Wildcats | 3 | 21 | 7 | 7 | 38 |

- Date: September 13
- Location: KSU Stadium, Manhattan, KS
- Game start: 1:10 p.m. CDT
- Game attendance: 46,102

=== Marshall ===
Marshall at #6 Kansas State

| Team | 1 | 2 | 3 | 4 | Total |
|---|---|---|---|---|---|
| • Thundering Herd | 7 | 9 | 0 | 11 | 27 |
| Wildcats | 7 | 3 | 3 | 7 | 20 |

- Date: September 20
- Location: KSU Stadium, Manhattan, KS
- Game start: 11:40 a.m. CDT
- Game attendance: 46,700
- TV announcers (FSN): Joel Meyers, Dave Lapham, Jim Knox

=== At Texas ===
#16 Kansas State at #13 Texas

| Team | 1 | 2 | 3 | 4 | Total |
|---|---|---|---|---|---|
| Wildcats | 0 | 3 | 9 | 8 | 20 |
| • Longhorns | 7 | 10 | 0 | 7 | 24 |

- Date: October 4
- Location: Darrell K Royal–Texas Memorial Stadium, Austin, Texas
- Game start: 2:30 p.m. CDT
- Game attendance: 83,643
- TV announcers (ABC): Brent Musburger, Gary Danielson, Jack Arute

Scoring summary
| 1 | 4:10 | Texas | Tony Jeffery blocked punt return (Dusty Mangum kick) | Texas 7–0 |
| 2 | 13:30 | Texas | Dusty Mangum 22-yard field goal | Texas 10–0 |
| 2 | 3:45 | KSU | Joe Rheem 41-yard field goal | Texas 10–3 |
| 2 | 1:00 | Texas | Sloan Thomas 51-yard pass from Chance Mock (Mangum kick) | Texas 17–3 |
| 3 | 12:24 | KSU | Ell Roberson 27-yard run (Rheem kick) | Texas 17–10 |
| 3 | 10:04 | KSU | Safety | Texas 17–12 |
| 4 | 14:00 | KSU | Ell Roberson 1-yard run (Roberson run) | KSU 20–17 |
| 4 | 5:45 | Texas | Vince Young 1-yard run (Mangum kick) | Texas 24–20 |

=== At Oklahoma State ===
#22 Kansas State at Oklahoma State

| Team | 1 | 2 | 3 | 4 | Total |
|---|---|---|---|---|---|
| Wildcats | 7 | 7 | 7 | 13 | 34 |
| • Cowboys | 7 | 14 | 14 | 3 | 38 |

- Date: October 11
- Location: Boone Pickens Stadium, Stillwater, OK
- Game start: 11:30 p.m. CDT
- Game attendance: 46,087
- TV announcers (FSN): Bill Land, Gary Reasons, John Rhadigan

=== Colorado ===
Colorado at Kansas State

| Team | 1 | 2 | 3 | 4 | Total |
|---|---|---|---|---|---|
| Buffaloes | 7 | 6 | 0 | 7 | 20 |
| • Wildcats | 9 | 6 | 14 | 20 | 49 |

- Date: October 18
- Location: KSU Stadium, Manhattan, KS
- Game start: 1:10 p.m. CDT
- Game attendance: 51,536

=== Kansas ===
Kansas at Kansas State

| Team | 1 | 2 | 3 | 4 | Total |
|---|---|---|---|---|---|
| Jayhawks | 3 | 0 | 3 | 0 | 6 |
| • Wildcats | 7 | 21 | 14 | 0 | 42 |

- Date: October 25
- Location: KSU Stadium, Manhattan, KS
- Game start: 1:10 p.m. CDT
- Game attendance: 51,614

=== Baylor ===
Baylor at Kansas State

| Team | 1 | 2 | 3 | 4 | Total |
|---|---|---|---|---|---|
| Bears | 3 | 7 | 0 | 0 | 10 |
| • Wildcats | 0 | 14 | 10 | 14 | 38 |

- Date: November 1
- Location: KSU Stadium, Manhattan, KS
- Game start: 1:10 p.m. CDT
- Game attendance: 44,885

=== At Iowa State ===
Kansas State at Iowa State

| Team | 1 | 2 | 3 | 4 | Total |
|---|---|---|---|---|---|
| • Wildcats | 7 | 7 | 24 | 7 | 45 |
| Cyclones | 0 | 0 | 0 | 0 | 0 |

- Date: November 8
- Location: Jack Trice Stadium, Ames, Iowa

Scoring summary
| 1 | 5:35 | KSU | Darren Sproles 23-yard run (Joe Rheem kick) | KSU 7–0 |
| 2 | 14:55 | KSU | Thomas Hill 9-yard pass from Ell Roberson (Rheem kick) | KSU 14–0 |
| 3 | 14:49 | KSU | Darren Sproles 70-yard run (Rheem kick) | KSU 21–0 |
| 3 | 10:25 | KSU | James Terry 20-yard pass from Ell Roberson (Rheem kick) | KSU 28–0 |
| 3 | 9:18 | KSU | Darren Sproles 32-yard run (Rheem kick) | KSU 35–0 |
| 3 | 0:31 | KSU | Joe Rheem 38-yard field goal | KSU 38–0 |
| 4 | 3:41 | KSU | Dylan Meier 30-yard run (Rheem kick) | KSU 45–0 |

=== At Nebraska ===
Kansas State at #18 Nebraska

| Team | 1 | 2 | 3 | 4 | Total |
|---|---|---|---|---|---|
| • Wildcats | 7 | 0 | 10 | 21 | 38 |
| Cornhuskers | 0 | 7 | 0 | 2 | 9 |

- Date: November 15
- Location: Memorial Stadium, Lincoln, Nebraska
- Game start: 2:36 p.m. CST
- Game attendance: 78,014
- TV announcers (ABC): Brent Musburger (Play-by-play), Gary Danielson (Color), & Jack Arute (Sideline)

Scoring summary
| 1 | 1:42 | KSU | Darren Sproles 22-yard run (Joe Rheem kick) | KSU 7–0 |
| 2 | 7:45 | NEB | Mark LeFlore 5-yard pass from Jammal Lord (David Dyches kick) | Tied 7–7 |
| 3 | 9:30 | KSU | Ell Roberson 11-yard run (Rheem kick) | KSU 14–7 |
| 3 | 1:05 | KSU | Rheem 27-yard field goal | KSU 17–7 |
| 4 | 14:55 | KSU | James Terry 63-yard pass from Ell Roberson (Rheem kick) | KSU 24–7 |
| 4 | 10:00 | KSU | James Terry 37-yard pass from Ell Roberson (Rheem kick) | KSU 31–7 |
| 4 | 3:45 | NEB | Safety | KSU 31–9 |
| 4 | 1:38 | KSU | Ayo Saba 6-yard run (Rheem kick) | KSU 38–9 |

=== Missouri ===
Missouri at #19 Kansas State

| Team | 1 | 2 | 3 | 4 | Total |
|---|---|---|---|---|---|
| Tigers | 0 | 7 | 0 | 7 | 14 |
| • Wildcats | 7 | 14 | 3 | 0 | 24 |

- Date: November 22
- Location: KSU Stadium, Manhattan, KS
- Game start: 7:00 p.m. CDT
- Game attendance: 49,685
- TV announcers (TBS): Ron Thulin, Charles Davis, Craig Sager, Erin Andrews

Scoring summary
| 1 | 10:09 | KSU | Darren Sproles 5-yard run (Joe Rheem kick) | KSU 7-0 |
| 2 | 14:49 | KSU | Darren Sproles 7-yard run (Joe Rheem kick) | KSU 14-0 |
| 2 | 6:00 | MIZ | DeQuincy Howard 2-yard pass from Brad Smith (Matheny kick) | KSU 14-7 |
| 2 | 0:39 | KSU | Ell Robertson 1-yard run (Joe Rheem kick) | KSU 21-7 |
| 3 | 0:40 | KSU | Joe Rheem 40-yard field goal | KSU 24-7 |
| 4 | 3:35 | MIZ | Zack Abron 37-yard run (Matheny kick) | KSU 24-14 |

Darren Sproles ran for a school-record 273 yards in the win over Missouri. Sproles also broke the single-season rushing record for the second consecutive year.

=== Vs. Oklahoma (Big 12 Championship game) ===
#13 Kansas State Wildcats vs. #1 Oklahoma Sooners

| Team | 1 | 2 | 3 | 4 | Total |
|---|---|---|---|---|---|
| • Wildcats | 0 | 21 | 7 | 7 | 35 |
| Sooners | 7 | 0 | 0 | 0 | 7 |

- Date: December 6
- Location: Arrowhead Stadium, Kansas City, Missouri
- Game start: 7:11 p.m. CST
- Elapsed time: 3:17
- Game attendance: 79,451
- Game weather: Temperature 39 °F (4 °C); Wind: S 5 mph (8.0 km/h); Weather: Clear
- Referee: Jon Bible
- TV announcers (ABC): Brent Musburger (Play-by-play), Gary Danielson (Color), & Jack Arute (Sideline)

Scoring summary
| 1 | 12:19 | OU | Kejuan Jones 42-yard run (Trey DiCarlo kick) | OU 7–0 |
| 2 | 13:57 | KSU | Brian Casey 19-yard pass from Ell Roberson (Joe Rheem kick) | Tied 7–7 |
| 2 | 11:34 | KSU | James Terry 63-yard pass from Ell Roberson (Rheem kick) | KSU 14–7 |
| 2 | 3:18 | KSU | Darren Sproles 60-yard pass from Ell Roberson (Rheem kick) | KSU 21–7 |
| 3 | 3:02 | KSU | Antoine Polite 60-yard pass from Ell Roberson (Rheem kick) | KSU 28–7 |
| 4 | 10:24 | KSU | Ted Sims 27-yard interception return (Rheem kick) | KSU 35–7 |

Kansas State manhandled the #1 Sooners at Arrowhead Stadium to win their first conference title since 1934.

=== Vs. Ohio State (Fiesta Bowl) ===
#7 Ohio State vs. #8 Kansas State

| Team | 1 | 2 | 3 | 4 | Total |
|---|---|---|---|---|---|
| • Buckeyes | 14 | 7 | 14 | 0 | 35 |
| Wildcats | 0 | 7 | 7 | 14 | 28 |

- Date: January 2
- Location: Sun Devil Stadium, Tempe, AZ
- Game start: 7:00 p.m. CST
- Game attendance: 73,425
- Referee: Ron Cherry
- TV announcers (ABC): Tim Brant, Ed Cunningham, & Sam Ryan

Scoring summary
| 1 | 6:41 | OSU | John Hollins 7-yard blocked punt return (Mike Nugent kick) | OSU 7–0 |
| 1 | 2:49 | OSU | Santonio Holmes 6-yard pass from Craig Krenzel (Mike Nugent kick) | OSU 14–0 |
| 2 | 6:49 | OSU | Mike Jenkins 17-yard pass from Craig Krenzel (Mike Nugent kick) | OSU 21–0 |
| 2 | 3:01 | KSU | Darren Sproles 6-yard run (Joe Rheem kick) | OSU 21–7 |
| 3 | 8:59 | KSU | Ell Roberson 14-yard run (Joe Rheem kick) | OSU 21–14 |
| 3 | 4:53 | OSU | Michael Jenkins 8-yard pass from Craig Krenzel (Mike Nugent kick) | OSU 28–14 |
| 3 | 0:37 | OSU | Santonio Holmes 31-yard pass from Craig Krenzel (Mike Nugent kick) | OSU 35–14 |
| 4 | 13:25 | KSU | Ayo Saba 3-yard run (Joe Rheem kick) | OSU 35–21 |
| 4 | 2:47 | KSU | Ell Roberson 1-yard run (Joe Rheem kick) | OSU 35–28 |

== Roster ==
2003 Kansas State Wildcats football team roster
Players
Coaches
Offense

| Pos. | # | Name | Class |
|---|---|---|---|
| OT | 79 | Jon Doty | Jr |
| TE | 88 | Thomas Hill | Sr |
| TE | 86 | Brian Casey | Jr |
| OL | 53 | Nick Leckey | Sr |
| OL | 64 | Ryan Lilja | Sr |
| QB | 3 | Ell Roberson | Sr |
| FB | 44 | Travis Wilson | Sr |
| RB | 36 | Ayo Saba | So |
| QB | 14 | Jeff Schwinn | Sr |
| RB | 43 | Darren Sproles | Jr |
| WR | 5 | James Terry | Sr |
| WR | 2 | Antoine Polite | Jr |
| WR | 15 | Davin Dennis | So |

Defense

| Pos. | # | Name | Class |
|---|---|---|---|
| LB | 7 | Josh Buhl | Sr |
| LB | 18 | Bryan Hickman | Sr |
| DB | 9 | Randy Jordan | Sr |
| DE | 83 | Blake Seiler | So |
| DE | 98 | Andrew Shull | Sr |
| LB | 45 | Ted Sims | So |
| FS | 2 | Rashad Washington | Sr |
| DB | 26 | Tyler Woolfolk | Jr |

Special teams

| Pos. | # | Name | Class |
|---|---|---|---|
| K/P | 6 | Jared Brite | Sr |
| K | 15 | Joe Rheem | Jr |
| LS | 72 | Mike Wilson | Sr |
| LS | 52 | Russ Vanover | Jr |

Head coach

- Bill Snyder

Coordinators/assistant coaches

- Del Miller – Co-Offensive Coordinator & quarterbacks
- Greg Peterson – Co-Offensive coordinator & wide receivers
- Michael Smith – Running backs
- Matt Miller – Tight ends
- Bob Stanley – Offensive line
- Bret Bielema – Co-Defensive coordinator
- Bob Elliot – Co-Defensive coordinator & secondary
- Mo Latimore – interior Defensive line
- Joe Bob Clements – Defensive ends

Legend

- (C) Team captain
- (S) Suspended
- (I) Ineligible
- Injured
- Redshirt

== Statistics ==
=== Scores by quarter ===
| | 1 | 2 | 3 | 4 | Total |
|---|---|---|---|---|---|
| Kansas State | 95 | 175 | 130 | 149 | 549 |
| Opponents | 74 | 81 | 38 | 51 | 244 |

=== Team ===
| | KSU | Opp |
|---|---|---|
| Scoring | 549 | 244 |
| Points per game | 36.6 | 16.3 |
| First downs | 319 | 232 |
| Rushing | 176 | 98 |
| Passing | 127 | 121 |
| Penalty | 16 | 13 |
| Total offense | 6,615 | 4,246 |
| Avg per play | 6.2 | 4.3 |
| Avg per game | 441.0 | 283.1 |
| Fumbles-Lost | 22-13 | 13-9 |
| Penalties-Yards | 98-726 | 104-846 |
| Avg per game | 48.4 | 56.4 |

| | KSU | Opp |
|---|---|---|
| Punts-Yards | 71-2,859 | 112-4,113 |
| Avg per punt | 40.3 | 36.7 |
| Time of possession/Game | 30:24 | 29:36 |
| 3rd down conversions | 82/205 | 63/229 |
| 4th down conversions | 10/20 | 8/20 |
| Touchdowns scored | 73 | 31 |
| Field goals-Attempts | 12-17 | 8-18 |
| PAT-Attempts | 67-68 | 28-29 |
| Attendance | 376,878 | 247,868 |
| Games/Avg per Game | 8/47,110 | 4/61,967 |

=== Offense ===
==== Rushing ====
| Name | GP | Att | Gain | Loss | Net | Avg | TD | Long | Avg/G |
|---|---|---|---|---|---|---|---|---|---|
| Darren Sproles | 15 | 306 | 2,067 | 81 | 1,986 | 6.5 | 16 | 73 | 132.4 |
| Ell Roberson | 13 | 227 | 1135 | 160 | 975 | 4.3 | 15 | 33 | 75.0 |
| Total | 15 | 688 | 3,817 | 388 | 3,429 | 5.0 | 42 | 73 | 228.6 |
| Opponents | 15 | 549 | 2,113 | 486 | 1,627 | 3.0 | 6 | 45 | 108.5 |

==== Passing ====
| Name | GP-GS | Effic | Att-Cmp-Int | Yds | TD | Lng | Avg/G | Pct. |
|---|---|---|---|---|---|---|---|---|
| Ell Roberson | 13 | 143.19 | 294-152-12 | 2,545 | 24 | 63 | 195.8 | 51.7 |
| Jeff Schwin | 6 | 119.99 | 68-37-3 | 563 | 1 | 41 | 93.8 | 54.4 |
| Total | 15 | 137.50 | 371-194-17 | 3,186 | 25 | 63 | 212.4 | 52.3 |
| Opponents | 15 | 104.41 | 447-224-20 | 2,619 | 19 | 65 | 174.6 | 50.1 |

==== Receiving ====
| Name | GP | No. | Yds | Avg | TD | Long | Avg/G |
|---|---|---|---|---|---|---|---|
| James Terry | 15 | 64 | 1,232 | 19.2 | 13 | 63 | 82.1 |
| Antoine Polite | 13 | 29 | 409 | 14.1 | 1 | 36 | 31.5 |
| Total | 15 | 194 | 3,186 | 16.4 | 25 | 63 | 212.4 |
| Opponents | 15 | 224 | 2,619 | 11.7 | 19 | 65 | 174.6 |

== 2004 NFL draft ==
| Player | Position | Round | Pick | NFL club |
| Nick Leckey | Center | 6 | 167 | Arizona Cardinals |
| Rashad Washington | Strong safety | 7 | 236 | New York Jets |
