= Joel Klatt =

American college football commentator and analyst (born 1982)

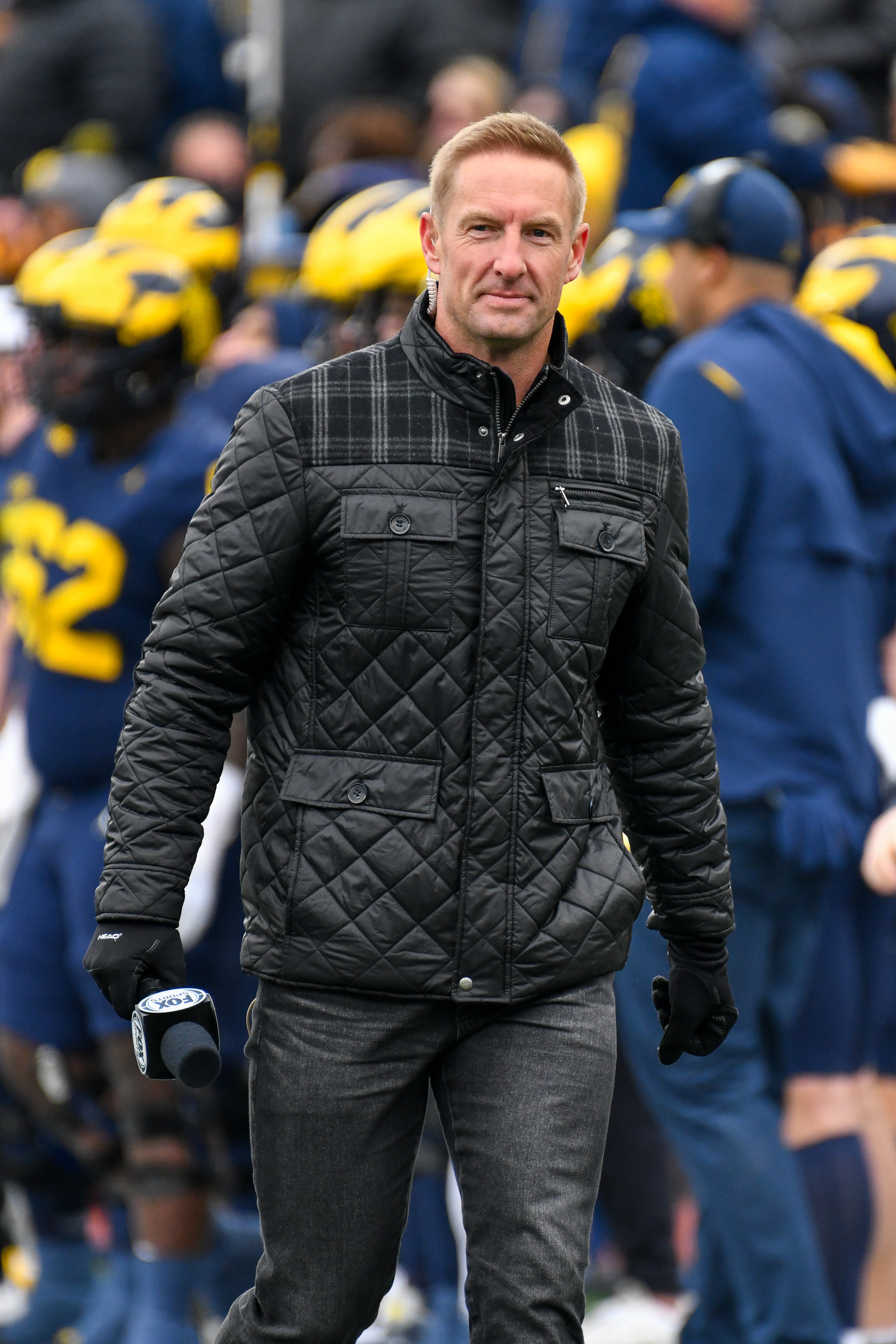
- Klatt in 2024

No. 14
- Position: Quarterback

Personal information
- Born: February 4, 1982 (age 44); Arvada, Colorado, U.S.
- Listed height: 6 ft 1 in (1.85 m)
- Listed weight: 205 lb (93 kg)

Career information
- High school: Pomona (Arvada)
- College: Colorado (2002–2005)
- NFL draft: 2006: undrafted

Career history
- New Orleans Saints (2006)*; Detroit Lions (2006)*
- * Offseason or practice squad member only

Joel Klatt (born February 4, 1982) is an American college football color commentator and analyst for Fox Sports. Klatt played college football for the Colorado Buffaloes. He was the first three-year starter at quarterback for Colorado since Kordell Stewart. He also played in Minor League Baseball for two seasons.

== Early life ==
Klatt was born in Arvada, Colorado. He was coached by his father, Gary, the head coach at Pomona High School in Arvada, Colorado. As a junior, he had four interceptions playing in the secondary, helping the team to a 9–3 record, and winning the Jefferson County league championship. As a senior at quarterback, he led the team to a 6–5 record, earned second-team all-state honors, and finished completing 78 of 125 passes (62.4%) for 1,250 yards and 16 touchdowns. He played primarily at shortstop in baseball, earning first-team all-state in his senior year and helping his team finish as runners-up in the state tournament. He set multiple records at his school in baseball: Home runs (40), runs batted in (RBIs) (66), hits (51), and slugging percentage (1.226). He also set three summer school records: Home runs (26), RBIs (99), and slugging percentage (1.147). He also played basketball as a guard. Klatt lettered in all three sports all four years of high school.

== Professional baseball ==
Klatt was drafted in the 11th round of the 2000 Major League Baseball draft by the San Diego Padres as a third baseman. He played for the Arizona League Padres in Peoria, Arizona, that summer where he led the team with 12 doubles and batted .209 with one home run and 15 RBIs in 51 games. In 2001, he played for the Idaho Falls Padres, where he batted .208 with two home runs, 10 RBIs, and three stolen bases in 45 games. In 2002, he told himself if he did not move up to the Class A-Advanced level, he would give college football a try. After he reported for spring training with the Eugene Emeralds, he realized he would never make it to the major leagues. He then left the team and walked on at the University of Colorado.

== College career ==
Klatt walked on for the Buffaloes at the University of Colorado Boulder as a quarterback in 2002. As a true freshman, he played in three games, mostly on the punt return team as a rusher and blocker against Missouri and Iowa State. Against Baylor, he went 0–3 passing. He is one of four true freshman walk-ons to see action since 1986 for Colorado and was the Scout Team Offense Award Winner for the Colorado State game. The Buffs were Big 12 North Champions that season and played in the Alamo Bowl.

The following year, Klatt earned the starting position at quarterback and went on to set 19 school records and tied one. He earned all-Big 12 honors and Colorado's John Mack Award (Colorado's Offensive Player of the Year). He was 233–358 passing for 2,614 yards and 21 touchdowns. Klatt made his first start in Colorado's first game of the season against Colorado State. He went 21–34 for 402 yards and four touchdowns, winning the game with a six-play, 75-yard drive with 40 seconds left in the game. For his performance, he was named National Player of the Week by The Sporting News, SI.com, and collegefootballnews.com, and won Big 12 Conference Offensive Player of the Week. He suffered a sprained shoulder injury during the Washington State game, causing him to miss two starts against Florida State and Baylor. He returned from the injury with a record-setting game against Kansas going 38–54 with 419 yards. His two 400-yard throwing games ranked fourth- and fifth-most passing yards in a game by a walk-on (or former walk-on) in NCAA Division I history prior to the 2005–06 season.

For the 2004 season, he started 12 games and played in all 13, being benched in the Iowa State game for lackluster performance. He was 192–334 for 2,065 yards and nine touchdowns, but had 15 interceptions. He was placed on scholarship status for this season, having played the previous two on walk-on status. He continued to set records at Colorado and led the team to the Big 12 Conference North title before losing the championship game to Oklahoma. He then went on to lead his team to victory in the Houston Bowl against UTEP. He set eight school records and recorded his first, and only, reception going for 18 yards on a throwback with Bernard Jackson against Texas A&M. He was on the official watch list for the Davey O'Brien Award (one of 42 candidates), and Street & Smith’s selected him as an honorable mention preseason All-American.

He again led Colorado to the Big 12 North Title during the 2005 season, in which he set several Colorado quarterback records. However, Klatt's college career ended in the Big 12 Championship Game against Texas, when he was knocked out after being hit by Texas linebacker Drew Kelson during the 70–3 blowout. He suffered a severe concussion that left him hospitalized for weeks after the game.

Klatt was upset by the nonchalance of the NCAA over the effects of his career-ending hit. His comments included him saying the NCAA is "terribly run", "exploits athletes", and "has its priorities out of whack." Further:

"If they want to exploit us, as athletes, and sell our jerseys and put us on video games, then perhaps they should protect us on the field better, so that we can, in the future, get that compensation and possibly go to the NFL. It seems like they’re more concerned with what guys do after the play and after they score, which is completely irrelevant to safety, or anything like that. But if a player who goes into the end zone and gets a little too excited, is that as important as someone who gets a head injury? I just think their priorities are a little out of whack."

=== Career football statistics ===
Note: Bolded statistics denote career high

| Year | Team | Games | | | Passing | | | | | | | | Rushing | | | |
| Year | Team | GP | GS | Record | Cmp | Att | Pct | Yds | Y/A | TD | Int | Rtg | Att | Yds | Avg | TD |
|---|---|---|---|---|---|---|---|---|---|---|---|---|---|---|---|---|
| 2002 | Colorado | 3 | 0 | — | 0 | 3 | 0.0 | 0 | 0.0 | 0 | 0 | 0.0 | 0 | 0 | 0.0 | 0 |
| 2003 | Colorado | 11 | 10 | 4–6 | 233 | 358 | **65.1** | 2,614 | **7.3** | **21** | 10 | **140.2** | **68** | −91 | −1.3 | 1 |
| 2004 | Colorado | 13 | 12 | 8–4 | 216 | 367 | 58.9 | 2,398 | 6.5 | 11 | **15** | 115.5 | 46 | −58 | −1.3 | **2** |
| 2005 | Colorado | 12 | 12 | 7–5 | **241** | **400** | 60.3 | **2,696** | 6.7 | 14 | 8 | 124.4 | 54 | **3** | **0.1** | 0 |
| Career | | 39 | 34 | 19–15 | 690 | 1,128 | 61.2 | 7,708 | 6.8 | 46 | 33 | 126.2 | 168 | −146 | −0.9 | 3 |
Stats sourced by Sports Reference.

== Professional football career ==
Pre-draft measurables
| Height | Weight | 40-yard dash | 20-yard shuttle | Three-cone drill | Vertical jump | Broad jump |
|---|---|---|---|---|---|---|
| 6 ft 0 7/8 in (1.85 m) | 205 lb (93 kg) | 4.84 s | 4.36 s | 7.12 s | 31.0 in (0.79 m) | 8 ft 11 in (2.72 m) |
All values from Pro Day

Klatt was not selected in the 2006 NFL draft but did attend the Detroit Lions' and New Orleans Saints' rookie mini-camps after the draft. New Orleans signed him to a free agent contract after their mini-camp but released him. The Lions claimed him off waivers less than a week later but Klatt was released before the start of the regular season.

== Personal life ==
=== College honors ===
- National Player of the Week: August 20, 2003 (vs. Colorado State)
- John Mack Award (2003) (Colorado Award: Outstanding Offensive Player)
- Best Interview (2003) (Selected by Colorado Media)
- Eddie Crowder Award (2002) (Colorado Award: Leadership)

== Broadcasting and radio career ==
Klatt's first opportunity in broadcasting came when he filled in as an analyst on Friday night high school football games in the Denver area in the fall of 2006 for FSN Rocky Mountain. He became a studio host for Fox Sports Southwest's Saturday college football coverage from 2007 to 2008. His role expanded as he became a color analyst for Fox Sports Net in 2009. He also served as a host for the Colorado Rockies' pre- and post-game shows on Root Sports Rocky Mountain. He hosted a series of sports radio shows in the Denver area from 2007 to 2012, including a popular program on the FM station 104.3 The Fan from 2011 to 2012.

He joined Fox Sports 1 (FS1) for its launch in August 2013. Klatt spent his first two seasons with FS1 and Fox broadcast network as a full-time studio analyst for the network's college football coverage, host of Fox NFL Kickoff, a part-time game analyst, primarily working Thursday night contests on FS1 and called the 2014 Pac-12 Football Championship Game on Fox. Prior to the 2015 season, Klatt was elevated to Fox Sports' lead college football game analyst, where he teams with play-by-play announcer Gus Johnson as part of Fox's Big Noon Saturday window. Klatt served as a digital host during the 2015 and 2016 U.S. Open Championships and the on-air interviewer during the 2019 U.S. Open Championship. Klatt serves as Curt Menefee's color analyst on telecasts of the XFL and USFL. Klatt also fills in for Kevin Burkhardt hosting MLB Whiparound.

Klatt is a guest commentator weekly on The Next Round, a live and on-demand streaming broadcast based in Birmingham, Alabama, hosted by Jim Dunaway, Ryan Brown, and Lance Taylor. He is also a weekly guest commentator on The Hardline, aired on KTCK's The Ticket 1310-AM and 96.7-FM stations, and based in Dallas. The show opens with the official "Joel Klatt Theme Song", performed by TC Fleming, formerly of KTCK. Klatt has had a long-running weekly guest spot on KKFN [104.3-FM] The Fan in Denver, Colorado predominantly commenting on the Denver Broncos and Colorado Buffaloes.

Klatt hosts a weekly podcast, Breaking the Huddle with Joel Klatt, which began in 2017. It is produced by Cadence13. The podcast is sponsored by Dr. Pepper. Klatt also hosts The Joel Klatt Show podcast on Fox Sports. This podcast follows the storylines and big moments of each college football season and offseason.

Klatt has appeared as an interview guest on The Hardline, The Petros and Money Show, and The Herd with Colin Cowherd.
