= 2003 Oklahoma Sooners football team =

American college football season

2003 Oklahoma Sooners football

National champion (Berryman QPRS) Big 12 South Division champion

Big 12 Championship Game, L 7–35 vs. Kansas State

Sugar Bowl (BCS NCG), L 14–21 vs. LSU
- Conference: Big 12 Conference
- South

Ranking
- Coaches: No. 3
- AP: No. 3
- Record: 12–2 (8–0 Big 12)
- Head coach: Bob Stoops (5th season)
- Co-offensive coordinators: Chuck Long (2nd season); Kevin Wilson (2nd season)
- Offensive scheme: Spread
- Co-defensive coordinators: Mike Stoops (5th season); Brent Venables (5th season)
- Base defense: 4–3
- Captains: Tommie Harris; Kory Klein; Teddy Lehman; Derrick Strait; Jason White; Renaldo Works
- Home stadium: Gaylord Family Oklahoma Memorial Stadium

2003 Big 12 Conference football standings
	Conf.			Overall
Team	W		L	W		L
North Division
No. 14 Kansas State x$	6	–	2	11	–	4
No. 19 Nebraska	5	–	3	10	–	3
Missouri	4	–	4	8	–	5
Kansas	3	–	5	6	–	7
Colorado	3	–	5	5	–	7
Iowa State	0	–	8	2	–	10
South Division
No. 3 Oklahoma x%	8	–	0	12	–	2
No. 12 Texas	7	–	1	10	–	3
Oklahoma State	5	–	3	9	–	4
Texas Tech	4	–	4	8	–	5
Texas A&M	2	–	6	4	–	8
Baylor	1	–	7	3	–	9
Championship: Kansas State 35, Oklahoma 7
$ – BCS representative as conference champion; % – BCS at-large representative; x – Division champion/co-champions; Rankings from AP Poll

The 2003 Oklahoma Sooners football team represented the University of Oklahoma in the 2003 NCAA Division I-A football season, the 109th season of Sooner football. The team was led by two-time Walter Camp Coach of the Year Award winner (winning his second one that season), Bob Stoops, in his fifth season as head coach. They played their home games at Gaylord Family Oklahoma Memorial Stadium in Norman, Oklahoma. They were a charter member of the Big 12 Conference.

Conference play began with a win over the Iowa State Cyclones in Ames, Iowa on October 4, and ended with an upset loss to the Kansas State Wildcats in the 2003 Big 12 Championship Game on December 6. The Sooners finished the regular season 12–1 (8–1 in Big 12) while winning the Big 12 South. Despite their loss in the conference championship game, they were invited to the 2004 Sugar Bowl, which served as the BCS National Championship Game that year, where they lost to the LSU Tigers, 21–14.

Following the season, Tommie Harris was selected 14th overall in the 2004 NFL draft, along with Teddy Lehman in the 2nd round, and Derrick Strait in the 3rd.

== Schedule ==
Date	Time	Opponent	Rank	Site	TV	Result	Attendance
August 30	6:00 p.m.	North Texas*	No. 1	Gaylord Family Oklahoma Memorial Stadium; Norman, OK	FSN	W 37–3	83,073
September 6	6:45 p.m.	at Alabama*	No. 1	Bryant–Denny Stadium; Tuscaloosa, AL (College GameDay)	ESPN	W 20–13	83,818
September 13	2:30 p.m.	Fresno State*	No. 1	Gaylord Family Oklahoma Memorial Stadium; Norman, OK	PPV	W 52–28	83,091
September 20	2:30 p.m.	UCLA*	No. 1	Gaylord Family Oklahoma Memorial Stadium; Norman, OK	ABC	W 59–24	83,317
October 4	6:00 p.m.	at Iowa State	No. 1	Jack Trice Stadium; Ames, IA	TBS	W 53–7	49,670
October 11	2:30 p.m.	vs. No. 11 Texas	No. 1	Cotton Bowl; Dallas, TX (Red River Shootout)	ABC	W 65–13	75,587
October 18	6:00 p.m.	No. 24 Missouri^{†}	No. 1	Gaylord Family Oklahoma Memorial Stadium; Norman, OK (rivalry)	FSN	W 34–13	83,327
October 25	6:00 p.m.	at Colorado	No. 1	Folsom Field; Boulder, CO	TBS	W 34–20	54,215
November 1	2:30 p.m.	No. 14 Oklahoma State	No. 1	Gaylord Family Oklahoma Memorial Stadium; Norman, OK (Bedlam Series) (College GameDay)	ABC	W 52–9	84,027
November 8	11:00 a.m.	Texas A&M	No. 1	Gaylord Family Oklahoma Memorial Stadium; Norman, OK	ABC	W 77–0	83,461
November 15	1:30 p.m.	Baylor	No. 1	Gaylord Family Oklahoma Memorial Stadium; Norman, OK	PPV	W 41–3	82,117
November 22	2:30 p.m.	at Texas Tech	No. 1	Jones SBC Stadium; Lubbock, TX	ABC	W 56–25	53,135
December 6	7:00 p.m.	vs. No. 12 Kansas State	No. 1	Arrowhead Stadium; Kansas City, MO (Big 12 Championship Game)	ABC	L 7–35	79,451
January 4, 2004	7:00 p.m.	vs. No. 2 LSU*	No. 3	Louisiana Superdome; New Orleans, LA (Sugar Bowl) (College GameDay)	ABC	L 14–21	79,342
*Non-conference game; ^{†}Homecoming; Rankings from AP Poll released prior to the game; All times are in Central time

== Roster ==
2003 Oklahoma Sooners football team roster
Players
Coaches
Offense

Pos.	#	Name	Class
OT	55	Jammal Brown
C	50	Vince Carter
G	70	Kelvin Chaisson
WR	9	Mark Clayton	Jr
TE	86	Lance Donley
WR	81	Brandon Jones
RB	20	Kejuan Jones
G	77	Davin Joseph
WR	29	Will Peoples
OT	60	Wes Sims
QB	18	Jason White	Jr
RB	47	Renaldo Works

Defense

Pos.	#	Name	Class
S	13	Eric Bassey
DE	80	Dan Cody
S	7	Brandon Everage
DT	97	Tommie Harris	Jr
DE	49	Jonathan Jackson
LB		Pasha Jackson
DT	93	Kory Klein
LB	11	Teddy Lehman
LB	10	Lance Mitchell
CB	28	Antonio Perkins
CB	2	Derrick Strait

Special teams

Pos.	#	Name	Class
K	83	Trey DiCarlo
P	87	Blake Ferguson

Head coach

- Bob Stoops

Coordinators/assistant coaches

- Chuck Long – Co-offensive coordinator & quarterbacks
- Kevin Wilson – Co-offensive coordinator & offensive line
- Cale Gundy – Running backs
- Darrell Wyatt – Wide receivers
- Kevin Sumlin – Tight ends & special teams coordinator
- Mike Stoops – Co-defensive coordinator & defensive backs
- Brent Venables – Co-defensive coordinator & linebackers
- Jackie Shipp – Defensive line
- Bobby Jack Wright – Defensive ends
- Mike Ekeler – Graduate assistant

Legend

- (C) Team captain
- (S) Suspended
- (I) Ineligible
- Injured
- Redshirt

Roster

== Game summaries ==
=== North Texas ===
North Texas Mean Green at #1 Oklahoma Sooners

Team	1	2	3	4	Total
North Texas	0	0	0	3	3
• #1 Oklahoma	10	13	7	7	37

- Date: August 30
- Location: Gaylord Family Oklahoma Memorial Stadium, Norman, Oklahoma
- Game start: 6:10 p.m. CST
- Elapsed time: 3:13
- Game attendance: 83,073
- Game weather: Temperature 84 °F (29 °C); Wind S 5 mph (8.0 km/h); Weather: Overcast
- Referee: Drew George
- TV announcers (FSN): Bill Land (Play-by-play), Gary Reasons (Color), & John Rhadigan (Sideline)

=== Alabama ===
#1 Oklahoma Sooners at Alabama Crimson Tide

Team	1	2	3	4	Total
• #1 Oklahoma	6	7	7	0	20
Alabama	0	3	7	3	13

- Date: September 6
- Location: Bryant–Denny Stadium, Tuscaloosa, Alabama
- Game start: 6:47 p.m. CDT
- Elapsed time: 3:27
- Game attendance: 83,818
- Game weather: Temperature 79 °F (26 °C); Wind SE 7 mph (11 km/h); Weather: Cloudy
- Referee: Tom Ahlers
- TV announcers (ESPN): Ron Franklin (Play–by–play), Mike Gottfried (Color), & Adrian Karsten (Sideline)

Scoring summary
1	12:22	OU	Trey DiCarlo 34-yard field goal	OU 3-0
1	7:10	OU	Trey DiCarlo 40-yard field goal	OU 6-0
2	4:55	ALA	Brian Bostick 44-yard field goal	OU 6-3
2	3:54	OU	Mark Clayton 46-yard pass from Jason White (Trey DiCarlo kick)	OU 13-3
3	6:53	ALA	Triandos Luke 20-yard pass from Brodie Croyle (Brian Bostick kick)	OU 13-10
3	4:31	OU	Brandon Jones 47-yard pass from Jason White (Trey DiCarlo kick)	OU 20-10
4	1:32	ALA	Brian Bostick 36-yard field goal	OU 20-13

=== Fresno State ===
Fresno State Bulldogs at #1 Oklahoma Sooners

Team	1	2	3	4	Total
Fresno State	0	0	7	21	28
• #1 Oklahoma	16	22	0	14	52

- Date: September 13
- Location: Gaylord Family Oklahoma Memorial Stadium, Norman, Oklahoma
- Game start: 2:35 p.m. CST
- Elapsed time: 3:21
- Game attendance: 83,091
- Game weather: Temperature 70 °F (21 °C); Wind W 8 mph (13 km/h); Weather: Overcast
- Referee: Cooper Castleberry
- TV announcers (PPV/KFRE-TV): Bill Land (Play-by-play), Dean Blevins (Color), and Curtis Fitzpatrick (Sideline)/Ralph Wood (Play-by-play) and Randy Rosenbloom (Color)

=== UCLA ===
UCLA Bruins at #1 Oklahoma Sooners

Team	1	2	3	4	Total
UCLA	10	0	14	0	24
• #1 Oklahoma	7	21	14	17	59

- Date: September 30
- Location: Gaylord Family Oklahoma Memorial Stadium, Norman, Oklahoma
- Game start: 2:35 p.m. CDT
- Elapsed time: 3:40
- Game attendance: 83,317
- Game weather: Temperature 79 °F (26 °C); Wind SSE 12 mph (19 km/h); Weather: Clear
- Referee: Steve Usecheck
- TV announcers (ABC): Brent Musburger (Play–by–play), Gary Danielson (Color), & Jack Arute (Sideline)

Scoring summary
Q1	OU	Works 15 yard run (DiCarlo kick)	OU 7–0
Q1	UCLA	Medlock 48 yard field goal	OU 7–3
Q1	UCLA	White 11 yard run (Medlock kick)	UCLA 10–7
Q2	OU	Wilson 12 yard pass from White (DiCarlo kick)	OU 14–10
Q2	OU	Perkins 74 yard punt return (DiCarlo kick)	OU 21–10
Q2	OU	Perkins 84 yard punt return (DiCarlo kick)	OU 28–10
Q3	OU	Donley 22 yard pass from White (DiCarlo kick)	OU 35–10
Q3	UCLA	Drew 3 yard fumble return (Medlock kick)	OU 35–17
Q3	OU	Bassey 34 yard interception return (DiCarlo kick)	OU 42–17
Q3	UCLA	Drew 91 yard kickoff return (Medlock kick)	OU 42–24
Q4	OU	Works 1 yard run (DiCarlo kick)	OU 49–24
Q4	OU	DiCarlo 41 yard field goal	OU 52–24
Q4	OU	Perkins 65 yard punt return (DiCarlo kick)	OU 59–24

Antonio Perkins became the first Division I-A player in history to have three returns for a score in one game while also breaking the NCAA single-game punt return yardage record.

=== Iowa State ===
#1 Oklahoma Sooners at Iowa State Cyclones

Team	1	2	3	4	Total
• #1 Oklahoma	3	19	10	21	53
Iowa State	0	0	0	7	7

- Date: October 4
- Location: Jack Trice Stadium, Ames, Iowa
- Game start: 6:10 p.m. CST
- Elapsed time: 3:10
- Game attendance: 49,670
- Game weather: Temperature 77 °F (25 °C); Wind NW 10 mph (16 km/h); Weather: Clear
- Referee: Hal Dowden
- TV announcers (TBS): Ron Thulin (Play-by-play), Charles Davis (Color), Erin Andrews, & Craig Sager (Sidelines)

=== Texas (Red River Shootout) ===
#1 Oklahoma Sooners vs. #11 Texas Longhorns

Team	1	2	3	4	Total
• #1 Oklahoma	14	23	14	14	65
#11 Texas	7	6	0	0	13

- Date: October 11
- Location: Cotton Bowl, Dallas
- Game start: 2:37 p.m. CST
- Elapsed time: 3:33
- Game attendance: 75,587
- Game weather: Temperature 79 °F (26 °C); Wind S 5 mph (8.0 km/h); Weather: Cloudy
- Referee: Jon Bible
- TV announcers (ABC): Brent Musburger (Play-by-play), Gary Danielson (Color), & Jack Arute (Sideline)

=== Missouri ===
#24 Missouri Tigers at #1 Oklahoma Sooners

Team	1	2	3	4	Total
#24 Missouri	3	7	0	3	13
• #1 Oklahoma	7	24	3	0	34

- Date: October 18
- Location: Gaylord Family Oklahoma Memorial Stadium, Norman, Oklahoma
- Game start: 6:05 p.m. CST
- Elapsed time: 3:16
- Game attendance: 83,327
- Game weather: Temperature 84 °F (29 °C); Wind S 9 mph (14 km/h); Weather: Clear
- Referee: John Laurie
- TV announcers (FSN): Joel Meyers (Play-by-play), Gary Reasons (Color), & John Rhadigan (Sideline)

Scoring summary
Q1	9:08	OKLA	Works 1 yard run (DiCarlo kick)	OKLA 7–0
Q1	3:11	MIZZ	Matheny 26 yard field goal	OKLA 7–3
Q2	11:55	OKLA	DiCarlo 19 yard field goal	OKLA 10–3
Q2	9:40	MIZZ	Smith 26 yard run (Matheny kick)	Tie 10–10
Q2	6:54	OKLA	Clayton 39 yard pass from White (DiCarlo kick)	OKLA 17–10
Q2	2:40	OKLA	Rankins 30 yard pass from White (DiCarlo kick)	OKLA 24–10
Q2	1:02	OKLA	Perkins 69 yard punt return (DiCarlo kick)	OKLA 31–10
Q3	3:17	OKLA	DiCarlo 30 yard field goal	OKLA 34–10
Q4	3:19	MIZZ	Mike Matheny 25 yard field goal	OKLA 34–13

=== Colorado ===
#1 Oklahoma Sooners at Colorado Buffaloes

Team	1	2	3	4	Total
• #1 Oklahoma	14	3	10	7	34
Colorado	7	0	0	13	20

- Date: October 25
- Location: Folsom Field, Boulder, Colorado
- Game start: 6:10 p.m. CST
- Elapsed time: 3:00
- Game attendance: 54,215
- Game weather: Temperature 43 °F (6 °C); Wind SE 7 mph (11 km/h); Weather: Clear
- Referee: Jon Bible
- TV announcers (TBS): Ron Thulin (Play–by–play), Charles Davis (Color), Craig Sager, & Erin Andrews (Sidelines)

Scoring summary
1	11:49	OU	Brandon Jones 54 yard pass from Jason White (Trey DiCarlo kick)	OU 7–0
1	6:03	OU	Renaldo Works 1 yard run (Trey DiCarlo kick)	OU 14–0
1	1:54	CU	D.J. Hackett 3 yard pass from Joel Klatt (Mason Crosby kick)	OU 14–7
2	4:15	OU	Trey DiCarlo 42 yard field goal	OU 17–7
3	8:17	OU	Trey DiCarlo 20 yard field goal	OU 20–7
3	1:37	OU	Mark Clayton 15 yard pass from Jason White (Trey DiCarlo kick)	OU 27–7
4	11:41	CU	Brian Calhoun 21 yard pass from Joel Klatt (Mason Crosby kick)	OU 27–14
4	5:03	CU	Derek McCoy 9 yard pass from Joel Klatt (kick blocked)	OU 27–20
4	1:59	OU	Mark Clayton 59 yard pass from Jason White (Trey DiCarlo kick)	OU 34–20

This was Oklahoma's first win in Boulder since 1988.

=== Oklahoma State (Bedlam Series) ===
#14 Oklahoma State Cowboys at #1 Oklahoma Sooners

Team	1	2	3	4	Total
#14 Oklahoma State	0	3	6	0	9
• #1 Oklahoma	10	14	14	14	52

- Date: November 1
- Location: Gaylord Family Oklahoma Memorial Stadium, Norman, Oklahoma
- Game start: 2:35 p.m. CST
- Elapsed time: 3:25
- Game attendance: 84,027
- Game weather: Temperature 57 °F (14 °C); Wind: Calm; Weather: Partly Cloudy
- Referee: Cooper Castleberry
- TV announcers (ABC): Brad Nessler (Play–by–play), Bob Griese (Color), & Lynn Swann (Sideline)

Scoring summary
1	11:05	OU	Trey DiCarlo 28-yard field goal	OU 3-0
1	4:22	OU	Kejuan Jones 2-yard run (Trey DiCarlo kick)	OU 10-0
2	11:47	OU	Kejuan Jones 3-yard run (Trey DiCarlo kick)	OU 17-0
2	6:49	OU	Brandon Jones 6-yard pass from Jason White (Trey DiCarlo kick)	OU 24-0
2	1:26	OSU	Luke Phillips 31-yard field goal	OU 24-3
3	14:34	OSU	Darrent Williams 11-yard interception return (Missed kick)	OU 24-9
3	5:29	OU	Jason White 1-yard run (Trey DiCarlo kick)	OU 31-9
3	2:13	OU	Mark Clayton 17-yard pass from Mark Bradley (Trey DiCarlo kick)	OU 38-9
4	8:50	OU	Brandon Jones 66-yard pass from Jason White (Trey DiCarlo kick)	OU 45-9
4	5:42	OU	Mark Bradley 14-yard pass from Paul Thompson (Trey DiCarlo kick)	OU 52-9

=== Texas A&M ===
Texas A&M Aggies at #1 Oklahoma Sooners

Team	1	2	3	4	Total
Texas A&M	0	0	0	0	0
• #1 Oklahoma	14	35	28	0	77

- Date: November 8
- Location: Gaylord Family Oklahoma Memorial Stadium, Norman, Oklahoma
- Game start: 11:05 a.m. CST
- Elapsed time: 3:12
- Game attendance: 83,461
- Game weather: Temperature 48 °F (9 °C); Wind E 7 mph (11 km/h); Weather: Overcast
- Referee: Randy Christal
- TV announcers (ABC): Tim Brant (Play–by–play), Ed Cunningham (Color), & Sam Ryan (Sideline)

Scoring summary
Q1	OU	Clayton 22 yard pass from White (DiCarlo kick)	OU 7–0
Q1	OU	Jones 6 yard run (DiCarlo kick)	OU 14–0
Q2	OU	Clayton 42 yard pass from White (DiCarlo kick)	OU 21–0
Q2	OU	Rankins 7 yard pass from White (DiCarlo kick)	OU 28–0
Q2	OU	Jones 7 yard run (DiCarlo kick)	OU 35–0
Q2	OU	Clayton 28 yard pass from White (DiCarlo kick)	OU 42–0
Q2	OU	Wilson 13 yard pass from White (DiCarlo kick)	OU 49–0
Q3	OU	Thompson 29 yard run (DiCarlo kick)	OU 56–0
Q3	OU	Thompson 4 yard run (DiCarlo kick)	OU 63–0
Q3	OU	Hickson 2 yard run (DiCarlo kick)	OU 70–0
Q3	OU	Strait 18 yard fumble return (DiCarlo kick)	OU 77–0

=== Baylor ===
Baylor Bears at #1 Oklahoma Sooners

Team	1	2	3	4	Total
Baylor	0	3	0	0	3
• #1 Oklahoma	24	10	0	7	41

- Date: November 15
- Location: Gaylord Family Oklahoma Memorial Stadium, Norman, Oklahoma
- Game start: 1:35 p.m. CST
- Elapsed time: 3:05
- Game attendance: 82,117
- Game weather: Temperature 66 °F (19 °C); Wind NW 6 mph (9.7 km/h); Weather: Partly Cloudy
- Referee: Walter Davenport

=== Texas Tech ===
#1 Oklahoma Sooners at Texas Tech Red Raiders

Team	1	2	3	4	Total
• #1 Oklahoma	14	21	7	14	56
Texas Tech	3	7	8	7	25

- Date: November 22
- Location: Jones SBC Stadium, Lubbock, Texas
- Game start: 2:36 p.m. CST
- Elapsed time: 3:26
- Game attendance: 53,135
- Game weather: Temperature 73 °F (23 °C); Wind SW 23 mph (37 km/h); Weather: Cloudy
- Referee: John Laurie
- TV announcers (ABC): Brent Musburger (Play–by–play), Gary Danielson (Color), & Jack Arute (Sideline)

Scoring summary
1	9:20	TTU	Keith Toogood 31-yard field goal	TTU 3-0
1	7:06	OU	Travis Wilson 28-yard pass from Jason White (Trey DiCarlo kick)	OU 7-3
1	3:31	OU	Mark Clayton 14-yard pass from Jason White (Trey DiCarlo kick)	OU 14-3
2	5:43	TTU	Wes Welker 5-yard pass from B.J. Symons (Keith Toogood kick)	OU 14-10
2	2:45	OU	Brandon Jones 27-yard pass from Jason White (Trey DiCarlo kick)	OU 21-10
2	1:41	OU	Kejuan Jones 1-yard run (Trey DiCarlo kick)	OU 28-10
2	0:18	OU	Kejuan Jones 2-yard run (Trey DiCarlo kick)	OU 35-10
3	8:29	OU	Kejuan Jones 1-yard run (Trey DiCarlo kick)	OU 42-10
3	6:48	TTU	Johnnie Mack 1-yard run (Jarrett Hicks pass from B.J. Symons)	OU 42-18
4	14:02	TTU	Taurean Henderson 1-yard run (Keith Toogood kick)	OU 42-25
4	6:33	OU	Kejuan Jones 1-yard run (Trey DiCarlo kick)	Oklahoma 49-25
4	3:11	OU	Kejuan Jones 77-yard pass from Jason White (Trey DiCarlo kick)	OU 56-25

=== Kansas State (Big 12 Championship Game) ===
#12 Kansas State Wildcats vs. #1 Oklahoma Sooners

Team	1	2	3	4	Total
• #12 Kansas State	0	21	7	7	35
#1 Oklahoma	7	0	0	0	7

- Date: December 6
- Location: Arrowhead Stadium, Kansas City, Missouri
- Game start: 7:11 p.m. CST
- Elapsed time: 3:17
- Game attendance: 79,451
- Game weather: Temperature 39 °F (4 °C); Wind S 5 mph (8.0 km/h); Weather: Clear
- Referee: Jon Bible
- TV announcers (ABC): Brent Musburger (Play-by-play), Gary Danielson (Color), & Jack Arute (Sideline)

=== LSU (Sugar Bowl) ===
#2 LSU Tigers vs. #3 Oklahoma Sooners

Team	1	2	3	4	Total
• #2 LSU	7	7	7	0	21
#3 Oklahoma	0	7	0	7	14

- Date: January 4
- Location: Louisiana Superdome, New Orleans
- Game start: 7:25 p.m. CST
- Elapsed time: 3:43
- Game attendance: 79,342
- Game weather: Indoors
- Referee: Dennis Hennigan
- TV announcers (ABC): Brent Musburger (Play-by-play), Gary Danielson (Color), & Jack Arute (Sideline)

== Statistics ==
=== Team ===
	OU	Opp
Points per Game	42.9	15.3
First downs	315	190
Rushing	115	80
Passing	173	102
Penalty	27	8
Rushing Yardage	2,043	1,585
Rushing Attempts	538	462
Avg per Rush	3.8	3.4
Avg per Game	145.9	113.2
Passing Yardage	4,109	2,050
Avg per Game	293.5	146.4
Completions-Attempts	299-480 (62.3%)	218-419 (52%)
Total Offense	6,152	3,635
Total Plays	1,018	881
Avg per Play	6	4.1
Avg per Game	439.4	259.6
Fumbles-Lost	17-6	26-12

	OU	Opp
Punts-Yards	60-2,389 (39.8 avg)	102-4,071 (39.9 avg)
Punt returns-Total Yards	56-668 (11.9 avg)	22-93 (4.2 avg)
Kick returns-Total Yards	30-656 (21.9 avg)	54-997 (18.5 avg)
Avg Time of Possession per Game	32:15	27:45
Penalties-Yards	86-673	96-808
Avg per Game	48.1	57.7
3rd Down Conversions	86/202 (42.6%)	59/209 (28.2%)
4th Down Conversions	16/29 (55.2%)	8/24 (33.3%)
Sacks By-Yards	45-269	28-208
Total TDs	78	27
Rushing	27	11
Passing	43	1
Fields Goals-Attempts	19-22 (86.4%)	9/10 (90%)
PAT-Attempts	74-76 (97.4%)	23-26 (88.5%)
Total Attendance	582,413	240,838
Games-Avg per Game	7-83,202	4-60,210

=== Scores by quarter ===
	1	2	3	4	Total
Opponents	37	57	56	64	214
Oklahoma	146	219	114	122	601

== Rankings ==
Ranking movements Legend: ██ Increase in ranking ██ Decrease in ranking
	Week																	
Poll	Pre	1	2	3	4	5	6	7	8	9	10	11	12	13	14	15	16	Final
AP	1	1*	1	1	1	1	1	1	1	1	1	1	1	1	1	1	3	3
Coaches Poll	1	1	1	1	1	1	1	1	1	1	1	1	1	1	1	1	3	3
BCS	Not released									1	1	1	1	1	1	1	1	Not released

== 2004 NFL draft ==
The 2004 NFL draft was held on April 24–25, 2004 at The Theater at Madison Square Garden in New York City. The following Oklahoma players were either selected or signed as undrafted free agents following the draft.

Round	Pick	Player	Position	NFL team
1	14	Tommie Harris	Defensive tackle	Chicago Bears
2	37	Teddy Lehman	Linebacker	Detroit Lions
3	76	Derrick Strait	Cornerback	New York Jets
