= 2003 Nebraska Cornhuskers football team =

American college football season

2003 Nebraska Cornhuskers football

Alamo Bowl champion

Alamo Bowl, W 17–3 vs. Michigan State
- Conference: Big 12 Conference
- North Division

Ranking
- Coaches: No. 18
- AP: No. 19
- Record: 10–3 (5–3 Big 12)
- Head coach: Frank Solich (6th season; regular season); Bo Pelini (interim; bowl game)
- Offensive coordinator: Barney Cotton (1st season)
- Offensive scheme: I formation
- Defensive coordinator: Bo Pelini (1st season)
- Base defense: 4–3
- Home stadium: Memorial Stadium

2003 Big 12 Conference football standings
	Conf.			Overall
Team	W		L	W		L
North Division
No. 14 Kansas State x$	6	–	2	11	–	4
No. 19 Nebraska	5	–	3	10	–	3
Missouri	4	–	4	8	–	5
Kansas	3	–	5	6	–	7
Colorado	3	–	5	5	–	7
Iowa State	0	–	8	2	–	10
South Division
No. 3 Oklahoma x%	8	–	0	12	–	2
No. 12 Texas	7	–	1	10	–	3
Oklahoma State	5	–	3	9	–	4
Texas Tech	4	–	4	8	–	5
Texas A&M	2	–	6	4	–	8
Baylor	1	–	7	3	–	9
Championship: Kansas State 35, Oklahoma 7
$ – BCS representative as conference champion; % – BCS at-large representative; x – Division champion/co-champions; Rankings from AP Poll

The 2003 Nebraska Cornhuskers football team represented the University of Nebraska–Lincoln in the 2003 NCAA Division I-A football season. The team was coached by Frank Solich and played their home games in Memorial Stadium in Lincoln, Nebraska. After the Colorado game, Solich was fired as head coach. Defensive coordinator Bo Pelini served as interim head coach for the Alamo Bowl. By firing Frank Solich, Nebraska became the first Division I-A football team to fire a Head Coach immediately following a 9-3 season or better, without a scandal, or an NCAA investigation.

== Schedule ==
Date	Time	Opponent	Rank	Site	TV	Result	Attendance	Source
August 30	2:30 pm	No. 24 Oklahoma State		Memorial Stadium; Lincoln, NE	ABC	W 17–7	78,058	
September 6	11:30 am	Utah State*	No. 23	Memorial Stadium; Lincoln, NE	FSN	W 31–7	77,284	
September 13	7:00 pm	Penn State*	No. 18	Memorial Stadium; Lincoln, NE	ABC	W 18–10	78,008	
September 25	6:45 pm	at Southern Miss*	No. 15	M. M. Roberts Stadium; Hattiesburg, MS	ESPN	W 38–14	36,125	
October 4	12:30 pm	Troy State*	No. 12	Memorial Stadium; Lincoln, NE		W 30–0	77,825	
October 11	6:00 pm	at Missouri	No. 10	Faurot Field; Columbia, MO (rivalry)	TBS	L 24–41	68,349	
October 18	11:30 am	Texas A&M^{†}	No. 18	Memorial Stadium; Lincoln, NE	FSN	W 48–12	77,604	
October 25	11:30 am	Iowa State	No. 14	Memorial Stadium; Lincoln, NE (rivalry)	PPV	W 28–0	77,483	
November 1	11:00 am	at No. 16 Texas	No. 12	Darrell K Royal–Texas Memorial Stadium; Austin, TX	ABC	L 7–31	83,308	
November 8	2:30 pm	at Kansas	No. 19	Memorial Stadium; Lawrence, KS (rivalry)	FSN	W 24–3	50,107	
November 15	2:30 pm	Kansas State	No. 18	Memorial Stadium; Lincoln, NE (rivalry)	ABC	L 9–38	78,014	
November 28	11:00 am	at Colorado	No. 25	Folsom Field; Boulder, CO (rivalry)	ABC	W 31–22	53,434	
December 29	8:00 pm	vs. Michigan State*	No. 22	Alamodome; San Antonio, TX (Alamo Bowl)	ESPN	W 17–3	56,229	
*Non-conference game; ^{†}Homecoming; Rankings from AP Poll released prior to the game; All times are in Central time

== Roster and coaching staff ==
2003 Nebraska Cornhuskers football team roster
Players
Coaches
Offense

Pos.	#	Name	Class
G	71	Jake Andersen	Jr
TE		Matt Ankerson	Fr
C	65	Greg Austin	Fr
WR	38	Brandon Biodrowski	Jr
WR	19	Andy Birkel	Fr
OL		Aaron Burbach	Fr
G	59	Brett Byford	Fr
QB	12	Joe Dailey	Fr
FB	4	Judd Davies (C)	Sr
IB	1	Josh Davis	Sr
G	67	Darren DeLone	Jr
WR		Dan Erickson	Fr
G	78	Mike Erickson	Jr
WR	28	Isaiah Fluellen	RFr
QB	17	Garth Glissman	So
IB	30	Tierre Green	Fr
G	72	Tim Green	Sr
FB	6	DeAntae Grixby	Sr
C	58	Justin Haney	RFr
IB	36	Ben Hansen	Fr
TE	11	Matt Herian	So
TE		Sean Hill	Fr
IB	9	David Horne	So
OT	51	Richie Incognito	So
WR	31	Joel Jackson	Jr
TE		Patrick Johnson	Fr
TE	47	Dusty Keiser	Jr
WR	49	Tyler Kenney	RFr
TE	46	John Knopp	So
G	75	Brandon Koch	So
FB	45	Steve Kriewald	Jr
WR		Chris LeFlore	Fr
WR	10	Mark LeFlore	So
G	66	Jermaine Leslie	RFr
WR	13	Tim Liley	Sr
C	63	Jack Limbaugh	Sr
QB	15	Brett Lindstrom	Sr
OT	74	Newton Lingenfelter	RFr
OT	76	Chris Loos	Sr
QB	5	Jammal Lord (C)	Sr
C	64	Kurt Mann	RFr
WR	18	Mike McLaughlin	So
FB	30	Grant Miller	RFr
IB	21	Robin Miller	Sr
QB		Zach Miller	Fr
TE	81	Josh Mueller	Fr
WR	84	Grant Mulkey	RFr
G	61	Brian Nelson	Sr
WR	24	Jack O'Holleran	Jr
TE	86	Adam O'Rourke	RFr
WR	8	Ryan Ommert	Sr
OL		Charlie Peacock	Fr
TE	82	Phil Peetz	Sr
TE	85	J.B. Phillips	Fr
OT	56	Gary Pike	So
WR	2	Ross Pilkington	So
WR	25	Kade Pittman	Fr
OT	69	Nick Povendo	Jr
IB	22	Cory Ross	So
TE		Andy Sand	Fr
G	54	Carson Schott	So
WR	14	Matt Schroeder	So
OT	70	Ryan Schuler	Fr
TE	83	Chris Septak	Jr
C	79	Josh Sewell	Sr
TE	80	Alex Shada	Jr
FB		Scott Siegel	Fr
OL		Jeff Speichinger	Fr
WR	35	Dusty Stamer	Jr
WR	17	Seth Starkebaum	RFr
QB	16	Mike Stuntz	Jr
G	55	Junior Tagoa'i	Sr
OT	57	Cory Timm	RFr
FB	41	Dane Todd	RFr
OT	68	Dan Vili Waldrop	Sr
OT	53	Cody Volk	Sr
OT	73	Sam Wells	Jr
WR	20	Kiffin Wigert	Jr
FB	34	Andy Wingender	Sr
TE	44	Matthew Woodward	So
WR	3	Ben Zajicek	Jr

Defense

Pos.	#	Name	Class
DE	96	Titus Adams	So
RCB	27	Willie Amos	Jr
MIKE	61	Peter Atha	So
NT	59	Ryon Bingham	Sr
CB	16	Cole Biodrowski	So
SS	21	Philip Bland	Jr
DE	34	Stewart Bradley	RFr
LCB	12	Titus Brothers	Fr
DT	65	Chris Bryant	RFr
WILL	39	Chad Buller	Sr
SS	14	Daniel Bullocks	So
FS	20	Josh Bullocks	So
FS	36	Dan Burrow	Jr
LCB	4	Terrell Butler	Sr
DE	90	Adam Carriker	RFr
BUCK	11	Ira Cooper	Jr
CB	6	Donald DeFrand	So
BUCK	48	Charlie Denman	So
DB		Ben Eisenhart	Fr
DT	97	Seppo Evwaraye	So
NT	62	Anthony Fisher	RFr
FS	15	Tyler Fisher	So
WILL	41	Jared Franzluebbers	So
DB		Travis Gingery	Fr
NT	99	Brandon Greeson	RFr
CB	26	Kevin Guse	Sr
NT	73	Jared Helming	So
BUCK	2	T.J. Hollowell	Sr
WILL	40	Lannie Hopkins	Jr
CB	29	Kellen Huston	Jr
WILL	49	Adam Ickes	So
DE	88	Trevor Johnson (C)	Sr
DT	94	Patrick Kabongo	Sr
DT	95	Nathan Krug	So
BUCK	43	Kristopher Lewin	RFr
NT	70	Jason Lohr	Sr
DE		Kevin Luhrs	Fr
FS	32	Derek Matteo	Jr
DE	50	Jeff McBride	Jr
WILL	13	Corey McKeon	Fr
RCB	1	Lornell McPherson	Jr
DE	44	Jay Moore	RFr
DE	57	Wali Muhammad	So
DE	56	Trevor Neemann	Fr
NT	63	Matt O'Shea	So
DE	98	Chris Patrick	Fr
FS	31	Jerrell Pippens	Sr
DE		Andy Poulosky	Fr
MIKE	53	Mitch Reeves	RFr
DE		Thomas Rice	Fr
RCB	28	Pat Ricketts	Sr
SS	24	Brandon Rigoni	RFr
CB	30	Joey Robison	So
BUCK	51	Bo Ruud	Fr
MIKE	38	Barrett Ruud	Jr
MIKE	42	Steve Safranek	Sr
CB	8	Andrew Shanle	RFr
DT	76	Matt Shrader	Jr
SS	23	Shane Siegel	So
MIKE	54	Chad Sievers	Jr
DT	66	Le Kevin Smith	So
DT	74	Brandon Teamer	Fr
DE	5	Benard Thomas	Jr
CB	10	Fred Thorne	Sr
SS	25	Blake Tiedtke	So
DE	93	Tyler Toline	Jr
MIKE	35	Curt Tomasevicz	Sr
LCB	3	Fabian Washington	So
CB	33	Seth White	Sr
SS	9	Delrick Williams	Sr
WILL	7	Demorrio Williams (C)	Sr

Special teams

Pos.	#	Name	Class
PK	22	Sandro DeAngelis	Jr
PK	27	David Dyches	Fr
PK	32	Dale Endorf	Sr
P		Tyler Kester	Fr
P	37	Sam Koch	So
P	19	Kyle Larson	Sr
PK		Eric Lueshen	Fr
PK		Jared Nielsen	Fr
LS		Jake Peetz	Fr

Head coach

- Frank Solich
  6th season
  25th year at Nebraska
  Alma mater: Nebraska

Coordinators/assistant coaches

- Turner Gill
  1st season as AHC/QB coach
  12th year at Nebraska
  Alma mater: Nebraska
- Barney Cotton
  1st season as OC/OL coach
  1st year at Nebraska
  Alma mater: Nebraska
- Bo Pelini
  1st season as DC/LB coach
  1st year at Nebraska
  Alma mater: Ohio State
- Tim Albin
  1st season as RB/PG coach
  1st year at Nebraska
  Alma mater: Northwestern Oklahoma
- Ron Brown
  1st season as WR coach
  17th year at Nebraska
  Alma mater: Brown
- Scott Downing
  1st season as TE/ST coach
  4th year at Nebraska
  Alma mater: Sterling
- Jeff Jamrog
  1st season as DL/DE coach
  6th year at Nebraska
  Alma mater: Nebraska
- Marvin Sanders
  1st season as Sec coach
  1st year at Nebraska
  Alma mater: Nebraska
- Jimmy Williams
  1st season as LB coach
  1st year at Nebraska
  Alma mater: Nebraska
- Boyd Epley
  35th season as S&C coach
  35th year at Nebraska
  Alma mater: Nebraska

Legend

- (C) Team captain
- (S) Suspended
- (I) Ineligible
- Injured
- Redshirt

Roster
Last update: January 16, 2011

== Depth chart ==
Defense

FS
Josh Bullocks
Jerrell Pippens
⋅

WEAK	MIDDLE	STRONG
Demorrio Williams	Barrett Ruud	T.J. Hollowell
Chad Buller	Chad Sievers	Ira Cooper
⋅	⋅	⋅

SS
Daniel Bullocks
Shane Siegel
⋅

CB
Fabian Washington
Terrell Butler
⋅

DE	DT	DT	DE
Benard Thomas	Ryon Bingham	Le Kevin Smith	Trevor Johnson
Titus Adams	Patrick Kabongo	Brandon Teamer	Adam Carriker
⋅	⋅	⋅	⋅

CB
Pat Ricketts
Lornell McPherson
⋅

Offense

WR
Mark LeFlore
Jack O'Holleran
Tim Liley
⋅

LT	LG	C	RG	RT
Richie Incognito	Mike Erickson	Josh Sewell	Jake Andersen	Dan Vil Waldrop
Nick Povendo	Tim Green	Kurt Mann	Brandon Koch	Darren DeLone
⋅	⋅	⋅	⋅	⋅

TE
Matt Herian
Phil Peetz
Dusty Keiser

WR
Ross Pilkington
Isaiah Fluellen
⋅

QB
Jammal Lord
Joe Dailey
⋅

RB
Cory Ross
Josh Davis
David Horne
⋅

FB
Judd Davies
Steve Kriewald
⋅

Special teams
PK David Dyches
P Kyle Larson
KR Josh Davis
PR Josh Davis

== Game summaries ==
=== Oklahoma State ===
Oklahoma State at Nebraska [box score]

Team	1	2	3	4	Total
Oklahoma State	7	0	0	0	7
• Nebraska	3	0	14	0	17

- Date: August 30
- Location: Memorial Stadium, Lincoln, Nebraska
- Game start: 2:37 p.m. CST
- Game attendance: 78,058
- TV announcers (ABC): Brad Nessler (Play-by-play), Bob Griese (Color), & Lynn Swann (Sideline)

=== Utah State ===
Utah State at Nebraska [box score]

Team	1	2	3	4	Total
Utah State	7	0	0	0	7
• Nebraska	6	9	13	3	31

- Date: September 6
- Location: Memorial Stadium, Lincoln, Nebraska
- Game start: 11:40 a.m. CST
- Game attendance: 77,284
- TV announcers (FSN): Joel Meyers (Play-by-play), Dave Lapham (Color), & Jim Knox (Sideline)

=== Penn State ===
Penn State at Nebraska [box score]

Team	1	2	3	4	Total
Penn State	0	10	0	0	10
• Nebraska	3	6	6	3	18

- Date: September 13
- Location: Memorial Stadium, Lincoln, Nebraska
- Game start: 7:07 p.m. CST
- Game attendance: 78,008
- TV announcers (ABC): Brad Nessler (Play-by-play), Bob Griese (Color), & Lynn Swann (Sideline)

=== Southern Miss ===
Nebraska at Southern Miss [box score]

Team	1	2	3	4	Total
• Nebraska	17	0	14	7	38
Southern Miss	0	7	0	7	14

- Date: September 25
- Location: M. M. Roberts Stadium, Hattiesburg, Mississippi
- Game start: 6:45 p.m. CST
- Game attendance: 36,125
- TV announcers (ESPN): Mike Tirico (Play-by-play), Lee Corso, Kirk Herbstreit (Colors), & Dr. Jerry Punch (Sideline)

=== Troy State ===
Troy State at Nebraska [box score]

Team	1	2	3	4	Total
Troy State	0	0	0	0	0
• Nebraska	3	7	13	7	30

- Date: October 4
- Location: Memorial Stadium, Lincoln, Nebraska
- Game start: 12:30 p.m. CST
- Game attendance: 77,825

=== Missouri ===
Nebraska at Missouri [box score]

Team	1	2	3	4	Total
Nebraska	7	3	14	0	24
• Missouri	7	7	0	27	41

- Date: October 11
- Location: Faurot Field, Columbia, Missouri
- Game start: 6:10 p.m. CST
- Game attendance: 68,349
- TV announcers (TBS): Ron Thulin (Play-by-play), Charles Davis (Color), Erin Andrews, & Craig Sager (Sidelines)

=== Texas A&M ===
Texas A&M at Nebraska [box score]

Team	1	2	3	4	Total
Texas A&M	3	0	3	6	12
• Nebraska	20	0	14	14	48

- Date: October 18
- Location: Memorial Stadium, Lincoln, Nebraska
- Game start: 11:40 a.m. CST
- Game attendance: 77,604
- TV announcers (FSN): Bill Land (Play-by-play), Dave Lapham (Color), & Jim Knox (Sideline)

=== Iowa State ===
Iowa State at Nebraska [box score]

Team	1	2	3	4	Total
Iowa State	0	0	0	0	0
• Nebraska	21	7	0	0	28

- Date: October 25
- Location: Memorial Stadium, Lincoln, Nebraska
- Game start: 11:40 a.m. CST
- Game attendance: 77,483
- TV announcers (PPV): Dave Armstrong (Play-by-play), Eric Crouch (Color), & Bill Doleman (Sideline)

=== Texas ===
Nebraska at Texas [box score]

Team	1	2	3	4	Total
Nebraska	0	0	0	7	7
• Texas	7	7	3	14	31

- Date: November 1
- Location: Darrell K Royal–Texas Memorial Stadium, Austin, Texas
- Game start: 11:10 a.m. CST
- Game attendance: 83,308
- TV announcers (ABC): Gary Thorne (Play-by-play) and David Norrie (Color)

=== Kansas ===
Nebraska at Kansas [box score]

Team	1	2	3	4	Total
• Nebraska	3	7	7	7	24
Kansas	0	3	0	0	3

- Date: November 8
- Location: Memorial Stadium, Lawrence, Kansas
- Game start: 2:40 p.m. CST
- Game attendance: 50,107
- TV announcers (FSN): Bill Land (Play-by-play), Gary Reasons (Color), & John Rhadigan (Sideline)

=== Kansas State ===
Kansas State at Nebraska [box score]

Team	1	2	3	4	Total
• Kansas State	7	0	10	21	38
Nebraska	0	7	0	2	9

- Date: November 15
- Location: Memorial Stadium, Lincoln, Nebraska
- Game start: 2:36 p.m. CST
- Game attendance: 78,014
- TV announcers (ABC): Brent Musburger (Play-by-play), Gary Danielson (Color), & Jack Arute (Sideline)

=== Colorado ===
Nebraska at Colorado [box score]

Team	1	2	3	4	Total
• Nebraska	7	14	0	10	31
Colorado	7	9	6	0	22

- Date: November 28
- Location: Folsom Field, Boulder, Colorado
- Game start: 11:10 a.m. CST
- Game attendance: 53,434
- TV announcers (ABC): Keith Jackson (Play-by-play), Dan Fouts (Color), & Todd Harris (Sideline)

=== Michigan State ===
Michigan State vs Nebraska [box score]

Team	1	2	3	4	Total
Michigan State	3	0	0	0	3
• Nebraska	3	14	0	0	17

- Date: December 29
- Location: Alamodome, San Antonio, Texas
- Game start: 8:05 p.m. CST
- Game attendance: 56,229
- TV announcers (ESPN): Mike Tirico (Play-by-play), Lee Corso Kirk Herbstreit (Colors), & Dr. Jerry Punch (Sideline)

== Rankings ==
Ranking movements Legend: ██ Increase in ranking ██ Decrease in ranking RV = Received votes
	Week																	
Poll	Pre	1	2	3	4	5	6	7	8	9	10	11	12	13	14	15	16	Final
AP	RV	RV*	23	18	15	15	12	10	19	14	12	19	18	23	25	23	22	19
Coaches Poll	RV	RV	24	18	15	11	8	7	14	11	9	16	15	23	23	21	21	18
BCS	Not released									11	9	18	17	22	23	21	20	Not released

== After the season ==
Nebraska finished in 2nd place in the Big 12 North Division and tied for 4th conference-wide, with a final record of 10–3 (5–3). Prior to the season, Head Coach Frank Solich was feeling pressure to perform after a 7–7 (3–5) record the previous year (the first non-winning season since 1961), and had significantly revamped his coaching staff for 2003.

Despite the sweeping changes and the improvements they brought, which helped Nebraska to another 9-win season, Solich was fired at the conclusion of the regular season. Defensive Coordinator Bo Pelini was named Interim Head Coach and led the Huskers to a 17–3 Alamo Bowl win over Michigan State. When new Head Coach Bill Callahan was announced in later weeks, most of the existing assistants (including Pelini) were also fired.

Pelini would later return as Callahan's replacement in 2008.

=== Awards ===
Award	Name(s)
All-America 1st team	Josh Bullocks, Kyle Larson
All-America honorable mention	Richie Incognito, Demorrio Williams
All-Big 12 1st team	Josh Bullocks, Matt Herian, Richie Incognito, Kyle Larson, Demorrio Williams
All-Big 12 2nd team	Ryon Bingham, Barrett Ruud
All-Big 12 3rd team	Fabian Washington
All-Big 12 honorable mention	Daniel Bullocks, Josh Davis, Mike Erickson, Isaiah Fluellen, T. J. Hollowell, Trevor Johnson, Jammal Lord, Josh Sewell, Dan Vili Waldrop

=== NFL and pro players ===
The following Nebraska players who participated in the 2003 season later moved on to the next level and joined a professional or semi-pro team as draftees or free agents.

Name	Team
Titus Adams	New York Jets
Ryon Bingham	San Diego Chargers
Stewart Bradley	Philadelphia Eagles
Daniel Bullocks	Detroit Lions
Josh Bullocks	New Orleans Saints
Adam Carriker	St. Louis Rams
Josh Davis	New York Jets
Aaron Golliday	Scottish Claymores
T. J. Hollowell	New York Giants
Richie Incognito	St. Louis Rams
Trevor Johnson	New York Jets
Patrick Kabongo	Detroit Lions
Sam Koch	Baltimore Ravens
Kyle Larson	Cincinnati Bengals
Jammal Lord	Houston Texans
Jay Moore	San Francisco 49ers
Chris Patrick	New York Giants
Jerrell Pippens	Chicago Bears
Andy Poulosky	Sioux City Bandits
Cory Ross	Baltimore Ravens
Barrett Ruud	Tampa Bay Buccaneers
Bo Ruud	New England Patriots
Le Kevin Smith	New England Patriots
Fabian Washington	Oakland Raiders
Demorrio Williams	Atlanta Falcons
