= 2003 Texas A&M Aggies football team =

American college football season

2003 Texas A&M Aggies football
- Conference: Big 12 Conference
- South Division
- Record: 4–8 (2–6 Big 12)
- Head coach: Dennis Franchione (1st season)
- Offensive coordinator: Les Koenning (1st season)
- Offensive scheme: Multiple
- Defensive coordinator: Carl Torbush (1st season)
- Base defense: 4–2–5
- Home stadium: Kyle Field

2003 Big 12 Conference football standings
| | Conf. | | | Overall |
| Team | W | | L | W | | L |
|---|---|---|---|---|---|---|
North Division
| No. 14 Kansas State x$ | 6 | – | 2 | 11 | – | 4 |
| No. 19 Nebraska | 5 | – | 3 | 10 | – | 3 |
| Missouri | 4 | – | 4 | 8 | – | 5 |
| Kansas | 3 | – | 5 | 6 | – | 7 |
| Colorado | 3 | – | 5 | 5 | – | 7 |
| Iowa State | 0 | – | 8 | 2 | – | 10 |
South Division
| No. 3 Oklahoma x% | 8 | – | 0 | 12 | – | 2 |
| No. 12 Texas | 7 | – | 1 | 10 | – | 3 |
| Oklahoma State | 5 | – | 3 | 9 | – | 4 |
| Texas Tech | 4 | – | 4 | 8 | – | 5 |
| Texas A&M | 2 | – | 6 | 4 | – | 8 |
| Baylor | 1 | – | 7 | 3 | – | 9 |
Championship: Kansas State 35, Oklahoma 7
$ – BCS representative as conference champion; % – BCS at-large representative; x – Division champion/co-champions; Rankings from AP Poll

The 2003 Texas A&M Aggies football team represented Texas A&M University in the college football season of 2003. The team's head football coach was Dennis Franchione. 2003 was the first year for Franchione who resigned from Alabama in late 2002. Franchione, known for his history of turning struggling football programs around, replaced R. C. Slocum who was fired after a mediocre 6–6 season in 2002.

Franchione brought the majority of his coaching staff with him to College Station. Strength and conditioning coach Ben Pollard declined an offer to go to College Station and elected to remain at Alabama. Franchione signed a contract that was set to pay him a yearly salary of US$1.7 million through 2010.

The Aggies finished the 2003 season with a 4–8 record, including a nationally televised 77–0 loss to Oklahoma, the worst loss in A&M's history. The season also marked the first losing season for the Aggies in 21 years.

== Schedule ==
| Date | Time | Opponent | Site | TV | Result | Attendance |
|---|---|---|---|---|---|---|
| August 30 | 7:00 pm | Arkansas State* | Kyle Field; College Station, TX | | W 26–11 | 75,804 |
| September 6 | 7:00 pm | Utah* | Kyle Field; College Station, TX | | W 28–26 | 74,019 |
| September 18 | 6:30 pm | at No. 8 Virginia Tech* | Lane Stadium; Blacksburg, VA | ESPN | L 19–35 | 65,115 |
| September 27 | 2:30 pm | No. 17 Pittsburgh* | Kyle Field; College Station, TX | ABC | L 26–37 | 79,116 |
| October 4 | 9:00 pm | at Texas Tech | Jones SBC Stadium; Lubbock, TX (rivalry) | FSN | L 28–59 | 51,772 |
| October 11 | 12:30 pm | Baylor | Kyle Field; College Station, TX | | W 73–10 | 73,030 |
| October 18 | 11:30 am | at No. 18 Nebraska | Memorial Stadium; Lincoln, NE | FSN | L 12–48 | 77,604 |
| October 25 | 2:30 pm | No. 18 Oklahoma State | Kyle Field; College Station, TX | ABC | L 10–38 | 79,153 |
| November 1 | 12:30 pm | Kansas | Kyle Field; College Station, TX | | W 45–33 | 68,487 |
| November 8 | 11:00 am | at No. 1 Oklahoma | Gaylord Family Oklahoma Memorial Stadium; Norman, OK | ABC | L 0–77 | 83,461 |
| November 15 | 11:30 am | at Missouri | Faurot Field; Columbia, MO | FSN | L 22–45 | 55,505 |
| November 28 | 2:30 pm | No. 6 Texas | Kyle Field; College Station, TX (rivalry) | ABC | L 15–46 | 84,094 |
*Non-conference game; Rankings from Coaches' Poll released prior to the game; All times are in Central time

== Game summaries ==
=== Arkansas State ===
| | 1 | 2 | 3 | 4 | Total |
|---|---|---|---|---|---|
| Arkansas State | 0 | 3 | 0 | 8 | 11 |
| Texas A&M | 0 | 9 | 10 | 7 | 26 |

=== Utah ===
| | 1 | 2 | 3 | 4 | Total |
|---|---|---|---|---|---|
| Utah | 0 | 0 | 13 | 13 | 26 |
| Texas A&M | 14 | 7 | 0 | 7 | 28 |

=== Virginia Tech ===
| | 1 | 2 | 3 | 4 | Total |
|---|---|---|---|---|---|
| Texas A&M | 3 | 9 | 0 | 7 | 19 |
| Virginia Tech | 7 | 7 | 7 | 14 | 35 |

=== Pittsburgh ===
| | 1 | 2 | 3 | 4 | Total |
|---|---|---|---|---|---|
| Pittsburgh | 9 | 0 | 21 | 7 | 37 |
| Texas A&M | 0 | 13 | 0 | 13 | 26 |

=== Texas Tech ===
| | 1 | 2 | 3 | 4 | Total |
|---|---|---|---|---|---|
| Texas A&M | 0 | 14 | 0 | 14 | 28 |
| Texas Tech | 17 | 14 | 21 | 7 | 59 |

=== Baylor ===
| | 1 | 2 | 3 | 4 | Total |
|---|---|---|---|---|---|
| Baylor | 3 | 7 | 0 | 0 | 10 |
| Texas A&M | 10 | 28 | 21 | 14 | 73 |

=== Nebraska ===
| | 1 | 2 | 3 | 4 | Total |
|---|---|---|---|---|---|
| Texas A&M | 3 | 0 | 3 | 6 | 12 |
| Nebraska | 20 | 0 | 14 | 14 | 48 |

=== Oklahoma State ===
| | 1 | 2 | 3 | 4 | Total |
|---|---|---|---|---|---|
| Oklahoma State | 14 | 7 | 10 | 7 | 38 |
| Texas A&M | 0 | 0 | 0 | 10 | 10 |

=== Kansas ===
| | 1 | 2 | 3 | 4 | Total |
|---|---|---|---|---|---|
| Kansas | 7 | 7 | 6 | 13 | 33 |
| Texas A&M | 7 | 7 | 24 | 7 | 45 |

=== Oklahoma ===
| | 1 | 2 | 3 | 4 | Total |
|---|---|---|---|---|---|
| Texas A&M | 0 | 0 | 0 | 0 | 0 |
| Oklahoma | 14 | 35 | 28 | 0 | 77 |

=== Missouri ===
| | 1 | 2 | 3 | 4 | Total |
|---|---|---|---|---|---|
| Texas A&M | 0 | 6 | 3 | 13 | 22 |
| Missouri | 16 | 6 | 9 | 14 | 45 |

=== Texas ===
| | 1 | 2 | 3 | 4 | Total |
|---|---|---|---|---|---|
| Texas | 14 | 6 | 16 | 10 | 46 |
| Texas A&M | 0 | 9 | 6 | 0 | 15 |
