= 2003 Big 12 Championship Game =

- 8th Big 12 Conference Championship
- 2003 Big 12 Championship logo.
Kansas State Wildcats	Oklahoma Sooners
(10–3)	(12–0)
35	7
Head coach: Bill Snyder	Head coach: Bob Stoops
AP / Coaches / BCS; 13 / 13 / 15	AP / Coaches / BCS; 1 / 1 / 1
	1	2	3	4	Total
Kansas State	0	21	7	7	35
Oklahoma	7	0	0	0	7
- Date: December 6, 2003
- Season: 2003
- Stadium: Arrowhead Stadium
- Location: Kansas City, Missouri
- MVP: QB Ell Roberson, Kansas State
- Favorite: Oklahoma by 14
- Referee: Jon Bible
- Halftime show: Dr Pepper Million Dollar Throw for Dough
- Attendance: 79,451

United States TV coverage
- Network: ABC
- Announcers: Brent Musburger, Gary Danielson and Jack Arute

2003 Big 12 Conference football standings
	Conf.			Overall
Team	W		L	W		L
North Division
No. 14 Kansas State x$	6	–	2	11	–	4
No. 19 Nebraska	5	–	3	10	–	3
Missouri	4	–	4	8	–	5
Kansas	3	–	5	6	–	7
Colorado	3	–	5	5	–	7
Iowa State	0	–	8	2	–	10
South Division
No. 3 Oklahoma x%	8	–	0	12	–	2
No. 12 Texas	7	–	1	10	–	3
Oklahoma State	5	–	3	9	–	4
Texas Tech	4	–	4	8	–	5
Texas A&M	2	–	6	4	–	8
Baylor	1	–	7	3	–	9
Championship: Kansas State 35, Oklahoma 7
$ – BCS representative as conference champion; % – BCS at-large representative; x – Division champion/co-champions; Rankings from AP Poll

The 2003 Big 12 Championship Game was a college football game played on Saturday, December 6, 2003, at Arrowhead Stadium in Kansas City. This was the 8th Big 12 Championship Game and determined the 2003 champion of the Big 12 Conference. The game featured the Kansas State Wildcats, champions of the North division, and the Oklahoma Sooners, champions of the South division. Sponsored by soft drink brand Dr Pepper, the game is officially known as the Dr Pepper Big 12 Championship Game.

== Teams ==
=== Kansas State ===
The Wildcats came into the game 10–3, with a 6–2 mark in conference play. The Wildcats lost at home to Marshall in September, and followed it up with losses to #13 Texas in Austin, and Oklahoma State in Stillwater. The Wildcats would go on to win six games in a row, including their first win in Lincoln against the Nebraska Cornhuskers since 1968, clinching their third division title, and their third Big 12 Championship Game appearance.

=== Oklahoma ===
The Sooners came into the game already being called possibly the greatest team in college football history. They were undefeated, boasting a 12–0 record, including 8–0 in conference play. They ranked first in points scored per game (48.3) and points allowed (13.1) per game. They also came in with dominant victories of 65–13 and 77–0 over Texas and Texas A&M, respectively.

== Game summary ==
In one of the most stunning upsets in national conference championship history, Kansas State upended Oklahoma, consensus No. 1 in the polls for 16 consecutive weeks, 35–7. This was the fourth consecutive win for the North Division champ in an odd-numbered year – Nebraska in 1997 and ’99, Colorado in 2001 and KSU in 2003.

Kansas State head coach Bill Snyder’s squad played fundamental football in the Wildcats’ third trip to the title game, amassing 519 yards of total offense and clutch defense in the red zone to produce victory.

On the first possession of the game, it appeared another Oklahoma rout would take place as Kejuan Jones 42-yard touchdown run just 2:49 into the game gave Oklahoma a 7–0 advantage.

Snyder's Wildcats then began a 35–0 run almost 15 minutes later in game time as tight end Brian Casey caught a 19-yard touchdown pass from quarterback Ell Roberson. After taking over at their own 27-yard line, the drive lasted four plays and 58 seconds for 73 yards.

The drive was the first of three touchdown drives on the Wildcats’ next four possessions. After the initial score, Oklahoma's offense went three-and-out and had a missed field goal and an interception during their next five possessions.

Roberson and All-America running back Darren Sproles turned the tide with a 21-point second quarter. Roberson had 30.3 yards per connection and threw three TD passes in the opening half while Sproles rumbled to an eventual championship record of 235 rushing yards.

Two of the nation's testiest defenses entering the game allowed almost 1,000 yards (917 total), but the Wildcats limited the nation's No. 1 scoring team (48.3 points per game) to a touchdown and added a defensive score to ice the game with 10:16 left to play. Sophomore linebacker Ted Sims returned an interception 27 yards for the fifth K-State touchdown of the night.

2003 Big 12 Championship

Quarter	1	2	3	4	Total
No. 13 Kansas State	0	21	7	7	35
No. 1 Oklahoma	7	0	0	0	7

at Arrowhead Stadium • Kansas City, Kansas

- Date: December 4, 2021
- Game time: 7:00 p.m. CST
- TV: ABC

Game information

First quarter
Second quarter
Third quarter
Fourth quarter

== Scoring summary ==
First quarter
OU (0–7) - Kejuan Jones 42-yard run (Trey DiCarlo kick); 12:11

Second Quarter
KSU (7–7) - Brian Casey 19-yard pass from Ell Roberson (Joe Rheem kick); 13:57
KSU (14–7) - James Terry 63-yard pass from Roberson (Rheem kick); 11:34
KSU (21–7) - Darren Sproles 60-yard pass from Roberson (Rheem kick); 3:18

Third Quarter
KSU (28–7) - Antoine Polite 10-yard pass from Roberson (Rheem kick); 3:02

Fourth Quarter
KSU (35–7) - Ted Sims 27-yard interception return (Rheem kick); 10:16

== After the game ==
Despite the blowout defeat, the Sooners would only fall to #2 in the BCS rankings and go on to play in the 2004 Sugar Bowl (National Championship game), losing to the LSU Tigers, 21–14.

Kansas State went on to lose to the Ohio State Buckeyes in the 2004 Fiesta Bowl, 35–28.
