= 2003 Missouri Tigers football team =

American college football season

2003 Missouri Tigers football

Independence Bowl, L 14–27 vs. Arkansas
- Conference: Big 12 Conference
- North Division
- Record: 8–5 (4–4 Big 12)
- Head coach: Gary Pinkel (3rd season)
- Offensive coordinator: Dave Christensen (3rd season)
- Offensive scheme: Spread
- Defensive coordinator: Matt Eberflus (3rd season)
- Base defense: 4–3
- Home stadium: Faurot Field

2003 Big 12 Conference football standings
	Conf.			Overall
Team	W		L	W		L
North Division
No. 14 Kansas State x$	6	–	2	11	–	4
No. 19 Nebraska	5	–	3	10	–	3
Missouri	4	–	4	8	–	5
Kansas	3	–	5	6	–	7
Colorado	3	–	5	5	–	7
Iowa State	0	–	8	2	–	10
South Division
No. 3 Oklahoma x%	8	–	0	12	–	2
No. 12 Texas	7	–	1	10	–	3
Oklahoma State	5	–	3	9	–	4
Texas Tech	4	–	4	8	–	5
Texas A&M	2	–	6	4	–	8
Baylor	1	–	7	3	–	9
Championship: Kansas State 35, Oklahoma 7
$ – BCS representative as conference champion; % – BCS at-large representative; x – Division champion/co-champions; Rankings from AP Poll

The 2003 Missouri Tigers football team represented the University of Missouri during the 2003 NCAA Division I-A football season. The Tigers had an overall record of 8–5, including a 4–4 record in conference play, and a 27–14 loss to Arkansas in the Independence Bowl at Shreveport. They played their home games at Faurot Field in Columbia, Missouri. They were members of the Big 12 Conference in the North Division. The team was coached by head coach Gary Pinkel.

== Schedule ==
Date	Time	Opponent	Rank	Site	TV	Result	Attendance	Source
August 30	11:00 am	vs. Illinois*		Edward Jones Dome; St. Louis, MO (rivalry)	ABC	W 22–15	63,576	
September 6	2:00 pm	at Ball State*		Ball State Stadium; Muncie, IN		W 35–7	17,371	
September 13	1:00 pm	No. 15 (I-AA) Eastern Illinois*		Faurot Field; Columbia, MO		W 37–0	49,440	
September 20	1:00 pm	Middle Tennessee*	No. 23	Faurot Field; Columbia, MO		W 41–40 ^{OT}	55,075	
September 27	11:30 am	at Kansas	No. 23	Memorial Stadium; Lawrence, KS (Border War)	FSN	L 14–35	50,071	
October 11	6:00 pm	No. 10 Nebraska		Faurot Field; Columbia, MO (rivalry)	TBS	W 41–24	68,349	
October 18	6:00 pm	at No. 1 Oklahoma	No. 24	Gaylord Family Oklahoma Memorial Stadium; Norman, OK (rivalry)	FSN	L 13–34	83,327	
October 25	11:30 am	Texas Tech		Faurot Field; Columbia, MO	FSN	W 62–31	60,192	
November 8	1:30 pm	at Colorado	No. 22	Folsom Field; Boulder, CO		L 16–21	47,722	
November 15	11:30 am	Texas A&M		Faurot Field; Columbia, MO	FSN	W 45–22	55,505	
November 22	6:00 pm	at No. 19 Kansas State		KSU Stadium; Manhattan, KS	TBS	L 14–24	49,685	
November 29	12:00 pm	Iowa State		Faurot Field; Columbia, Missouri (rivalry)	ABC	W 45–7	46,435	
December 31	6:30 pm	vs. Arkansas*		Independence Stadium; Shreveport, LA (Independence Bowl, rivalry)	ESPN	L 14–27	49,625	
*Non-conference game; Rankings from AP Poll released prior to the game; All times are in Central time
