= 2003 Texas Longhorns football team =

American college football season

2003 Texas Longhorns football

Holiday Bowl, L 20–28 vs. Washington State
- Conference: Big 12 Conference
- South Division

Ranking
- Coaches: No. 11
- AP: No. 12
- Record: 10–3 (7–1 Big 12)
- Head coach: Mack Brown (6th season)
- Offensive coordinator: Greg Davis (6th season)
- Offensive scheme: Spread
- Defensive coordinator: Carl Reese (6th season)
- Home stadium: Darrell K Royal–Texas Memorial Stadium (Capacity: 80,092)

2003 Big 12 Conference football standings
	Conf.			Overall
Team	W		L	W		L
North Division
No. 14 Kansas State x$	6	–	2	11	–	4
No. 19 Nebraska	5	–	3	10	–	3
Missouri	4	–	4	8	–	5
Kansas	3	–	5	6	–	7
Colorado	3	–	5	5	–	7
Iowa State	0	–	8	2	–	10
South Division
No. 3 Oklahoma x%	8	–	0	12	–	2
No. 12 Texas	7	–	1	10	–	3
Oklahoma State	5	–	3	9	–	4
Texas Tech	4	–	4	8	–	5
Texas A&M	2	–	6	4	–	8
Baylor	1	–	7	3	–	9
Championship: Kansas State 35, Oklahoma 7
$ – BCS representative as conference champion; % – BCS at-large representative; x – Division champion/co-champions; Rankings from AP Poll

The 2003 Texas Longhorns football team represented the University of Texas at Austin in the 2003 NCAA Division I-A football season. The team was coached by head football coach Mack Brown and led on the field by Chance Mock and redshirt freshman quarterback Vince Young.

== Schedule ==
Date	Time	Opponent	Rank	Site	TV	Result	Attendance	Source
August 31	6:00 p.m.	New Mexico State*	No. 5	Darrell K Royal–Texas Memorial Stadium; Austin, TX	FSN	W 66–7	83,096	
September 13	11:00 a.m.	Arkansas*	No. 6	Darrell K Royal–Texas Memorial Stadium; Austin, TX (rivalry)	ABC	L 28–38	83,271	
September 20	8:15 p.m.	at Rice*	No. 13	Reliant Stadium; Houston, TX (rivalry)	ESPN2	W 48–7	45,764	
September 27	6:00 p.m.	Tulane*	No. 13	Darrell K Royal–Texas Memorial Stadium; Austin, TX	TBS	W 63–18	83,120	
October 4	2:30 p.m.	No. 14 Kansas State	No. 13	Darrell K Royal–Texas Memorial Stadium; Austin, TX (College GameDay)	ABC	W 24–20	83,643	
October 11	2:30 p.m.	vs. No. 1 Oklahoma	No. 11	Cotton Bowl; Dallas, TX (Red River Shootout)	ABC	L 13–65	75,587	
October 18	11:30 a.m.	at Iowa State	No. 20	Jack Trice Stadium; Ames, IA	PPV	W 40–19	45,355	
October 25	6:00 p.m.	at Baylor	No. 19	Floyd Casey Stadium; Waco, TX (rivalry)		W 56–0	42,118	
November 1	11:00 a.m.	No. 12 Nebraska	No. 16	Darrell K Royal–Texas Memorial Stadium; Austin, TX	ABC	W 31–7	83,308	
November 8	6:00 p.m.	at No. 21 Oklahoma State	No. 11	Boone Pickens Stadium; Stillwater, OK	FSN	W 55–16	47,660	
November 15	6:00 p.m.	Texas Tech	No. 6	Darrell K Royal–Texas Memorial Stadium; Austin, TX (rivalry)	FSN	W 43–40	83,596	
November 28	2:30 p.m.	at Texas A&M	No. 6	Kyle Field; College Station, TX (rivalry)	ABC	W 46–15	84,094	
December 30	7:00 p.m.	vs. No. 15 Washington State*	No. 5	Qualcomm Stadium; San Diego, CA (Holiday Bowl)	ESPN	L 20–28	61,102	
*Non-conference game; Rankings from AP Poll released prior to the game; All times are in Central time

== Game summaries ==
=== Oklahoma State ===
#5 Texas at #22 Oklahoma State

Team	1	2	3	4	Total
• Texas	7	7	27	14	55
Oklahoma State	9	7	0	0	16

- Date: November 8
- Location: Boone Pickens Stadium, Stillwater, Oklahoma
- Game start: 6:00 p.m. CST
- TV announcers (FSN): Joel Meyers (Play-by-play), Dave Lapham (Color) & Jim Knox (Sideline)
- Source: ESPN

Scoring summary
1	11:10	OKST	Luke Phillips 52-yard field goal	OKST 3-0
1	7:46	TEX	Will Matthews 2-yard run (Dusty Mangum kick)	TEX 7-3
1	2:42	OKST	Luke Phillips 32-yard field goal	TEX 7-6
1	0:07	OKST	Luke Phillips 53-yard field goal	OKST 9-7
2	5:23	OKST	Rashaun Woods 10-yard pass from Josh Fields (Luke Phillips kick)	OKST 16-7
2	4:01	TEX	Roy Williams 67-yard pass from Vince Young (Dusty Magnum kick)	OKST 16-14
3	9:26	TEX	Cedric Benson 1-yard run (pass failed)	TEX 20-16
3	5:09	TEX	Vince Young 23-yard run (Dusty Mangum kick)	TEX 27-16
3	4:14	TEX	Michael Huff 27-yard interception return (Dusty Mangum kick)	TEX 34-16
3	0:59	TEX	Will Matthews 7-yard run (Dusty Mangum kick)	TEX 41-16
4	6:13	TEX	Will Matthews 6-yard run (Dusty Mangum kick)	TEX 48-16
4	4:26	TEX	Matt Melton 48-yard fumble return (Dusty Mangum kick)	TEX 55-16

=== Texas Tech ===
Texas Tech at #6 Texas

Team	1	2	3	4	Total
Texas Tech	6	8	14	12	40
• Texas	7	17	11	8	43

- Date: November 15
- Location: Darrell K Royal–Texas Memorial Stadium, Austin, Texas
- Game start: 6:00 p.m. CST
- Game attendance: 83,596
- TV announcers (FSN): Joel Meyers (Play-by-play), Dave Lapham (Color) & Jim Knox (Sideline)

Scoring summary
Q1		TTU	Henderson 5 yard run (kick failed)	TTU 6–0
Q1		TEX	Scaife 8 yard pass from Young (Mangum kick)	TEX 7–6
Q2		TEX	Thomas 24 yard pass from Young (Mangum kick)	TEX 14–6
Q2		TEX	Benson 5 yard run (Mangum kick)	TEX 21–6
Q2		TTU	Peters 19 yard pass from Symons (Glover pass from Symons)	TEX 21–14
Q2		TEX	Mangum 45 yard field goal	TEX 24–14
Q3		TTU	McGuire 24 yard pass from Symons (Toogood kick)	TEX 24–21
Q3		TEX	Mangum 34 yard field goal	TEX 27–21
Q3		TEX	Benson 9 yard run (Williams pass from Young)	TEX 35–21
Q3		TTU	Peters 14 yard pass from Symons (Toogood kick)	TEX 35–28
Q4		TTU	Henderson 3 yard run (kick failed)	TEX 35–34
Q4		TTU	Henderson 11 yard run (kick failed)	TTU 40–35
Q4	:46	TEX	Johnson 9 yard pass from Mock (Matthews run)	TEX 43–40
