= 2003 Oklahoma State Cowboys football team =

American college football season

2003 Oklahoma State Cowboys football

Cotton Bowl Classic, L 28–31 vs. Ole Miss
- Conference: Big 12 Conference
- South Division
- Record: 9–4 (5–3 Big 12)
- Head coach: Les Miles (3rd season)
- Offensive coordinator: Mike Gundy (4th season)
- Offensive scheme: Pro spread
- Defensive coordinator: Bill Clay (3rd season)
- Base defense: 3–4
- Home stadium: Boone Pickens Stadium

2003 Big 12 Conference football standings
	Conf.			Overall
Team	W		L	W		L
North Division
No. 14 Kansas State x$	6	–	2	11	–	4
No. 19 Nebraska	5	–	3	10	–	3
Missouri	4	–	4	8	–	5
Kansas	3	–	5	6	–	7
Colorado	3	–	5	5	–	7
Iowa State	0	–	8	2	–	10
South Division
No. 3 Oklahoma x%	8	–	0	12	–	2
No. 12 Texas	7	–	1	10	–	3
Oklahoma State	5	–	3	9	–	4
Texas Tech	4	–	4	8	–	5
Texas A&M	2	–	6	4	–	8
Baylor	1	–	7	3	–	9
Championship: Kansas State 35, Oklahoma 7
$ – BCS representative as conference champion; % – BCS at-large representative; x – Division champion/co-champions; Rankings from AP Poll

The 2003 Oklahoma State Cowboys football team represented Oklahoma State University as a member of the Big 12 Conference during the 2003 NCAA Division I-A football season. Led by third-year head coach Les Miles, the Cowboys compiled an overall record of 9–4 with a mark of 5–3 in conference play, placing third in the Big 12's South Division. Oklahoma State was invited to the Cotton Bowl Classic, where the Cowboys lost to the Ole Miss. The team played home games at Boone Pickens Stadium in Stillwater, Oklahoma.

== Schedule ==
Date	Time	Opponent	Rank	Site	TV	Result	Attendance
August 30	2:30 p.m.	at Nebraska	No. 24	Memorial Stadium; Lincoln, NE	ABC	L 7–17	78,058
September 6	6:00 p.m.	Wyoming*		Boone Pickens Stadium; Stillwater, OK		W 48–24	44,158
September 13	6:00 p.m.	Southwest Missouri State*		Boone Pickens Stadium; Stillwater, OK		W 42–3	42,152
September 20	6:00 p.m.	at SMU*		Gerald J. Ford Stadium; Dallas, TX	FSN	W 52–6	27,106
October 4	6:00 p.m.	Louisiana–Lafayette*		Boone Pickens Stadium; Stillwater, OK		W 56–3	44,700
October 11	11:30 a.m.	No. 22 Kansas State		Boone Pickens Stadium; Stillwater, OK	FSN	W 38–34	46,087
October 18	2:30 p.m.	Texas Tech^{†}	No. 23	Boone Pickens Stadium; Stillwater, OK	ABC	W 51–49	48,500
October 25	2:30 p.m.	at Texas A&M	No. 18	Kyle Field; College Station, TX	ABC	W 38–10	79,153
November 1	2:30 p.m.	at No. 1 Oklahoma	No. 14	Gaylord Family Oklahoma Memorial Stadium; Norman, OK (Bedlam Series, College GameDay)	ABC	L 9–52	84,027
November 8	6:00 p.m.	No. 11 Texas	No. 21	Boone Pickens Stadium; Stillwater, OK	FSN	L 16–55	47,660
November 15	1:00 p.m.	Kansas		Boone Pickens Stadium; Stillwater, OK		W 44–21	40,850
November 22	11:30 a.m.	at Baylor	No. 24	Floyd Casey Stadium; Waco, TX	FSN	W 38–21	23,763
January 2	1:00 p.m.	vs. No. 16 Ole Miss*	No. 21	Cotton Bowl; Dallas, TX (Cotton Bowl Classic)	FOX	L 28–31	73,928
*Non-conference game; ^{†}Homecoming; Rankings from AP Poll released prior to the game

== Game summaries ==
=== SMU ===
Team	1	2	3	4	Total
• Oklahoma State	17	21	14	0	52
SMU	0	0	6	0	6

- Date: September 20
- Location: Gerald Ford Stadium, University Park, TX
- Game start: 6:00 p.m. CST
- TV announcers (FSN): Bill Land (play-by-play), Gary Reasons (color) & John Rhadigan (sideline)
- Source: ESPN

Scoring summary
1	10:10	Oklahoma St	Rashaun Woods 2 yard pass from Josh Fields (Luke Phillips kick)	Oklahoma St 7-0
1	4:11	Oklahoma St	Luke Phillips 32 yard field goal	Oklahoma St 10-0
1	1:22	Oklahoma St	Rashaun Woods 10 yard pass from Josh Fields (Luke Phillips kick)	Oklahoma St 17-0
2	14:40	Oklahoma St	Rashaun Woods 34 yard pass from Josh Fields (Luke Phillips kick)	Oklahoma St 24-0
2	12:43	Oklahoma St	Rashaun Woods 32 yard pass from Josh Fields (Luke Phillips kick)	Oklahoma St 31-0
2	8:41	Oklahoma St	Rashaun Woods 25 yard pass from Josh Fields (Luke Phillips kick)	Oklahoma St 38-0
3	13:31	Oklahoma St	Rashaun Woods 5 yard pass from Josh Fields (Luke Phillips kick)	Oklahoma St 45-0
3	10:19	SMU	Matt Rushbrook 5 yard pass from Tate Wallis (run failed)	Oklahoma St 45-6
3	4:53	Oklahoma St	Rashaun Woods 11 yard pass from Josh Fields (Brent Baisden kick)	Oklahoma St 52-6

=== Kansas ===
Team	1	2	3	4	Total
Kansas	3	7	3	8	21
• Oklahoma State	3	13	21	7	44

- Date: November 15
- Location: Boone Pickens Stadium, Stillwater, OK
- Game start: 1:00 p.m. CST

Scoring summary
Q1	11:20	OKST	Luke Phillips 34 yard field goal	OKST 3–0
Q1	4:48	KAN	Jerod Brooks 20 yard field goal	Tie 3–3
Q2	10:41	OKST	Vernand Morency 5 yard run (Luke Phillips kick)	OKST 10–3
Q2	5:39	KAN	Moderick Johnson 13 yard pass from Brian Luke (Jerod Brooks kick)	Tie 10–10
Q2	3:01	OKST	Luke Phillips 20 yard field goal	OKST 13–10
Q2	1:08	OKST	Luke Phillips 24 yard field goal	OKST 16–10
Q3	11:52	KAN	Jerod Brooks 21 yard field goal	OKST 16–13
Q3	10:19	OKST	Vernand Morency 19 yard run (Luke Phillips kick)	OKST 23–13
Q3	6:40	OKST	Shawn Willis 4 yard run (Luke Phillips kick)	OKST 30–13
Q3	2:27	OKST	Vernand Morency 6 yard run (Luke Phillips kick)	OKST 37–13
Q4	14:55	OKST	Rashaun Woods 8 yard pass from Josh Fields (Luke Phillips kick)	OKST 44–13
Q4	:50	KAN	Mark Simmons 19 yard pass from Brian Luke (Mark Simmons pass from Brian Luke)	OKST 44–21

Vernand Morency, starting in place for an injured Tatum Bell, rushed for a career-best 269 yards and three touchdowns.
