= 2003 Iowa State Cyclones football team =

American college football season

2003 Iowa State Cyclones football
- Conference: Big 12 Conference
- North Division
- Record: 2–10 (0–8 Big 12)
- Head coach: Dan McCarney (9th season)
- Offensive coordinator: Steve Brickey (2nd season)
- Offensive scheme: Pro-style
- Defensive coordinator: John Skladany (7th season)
- Base defense: 4–3
- Captains: Jordan Carstens; Lane Danielsen; Bob Montgomery; Casey Shelton; Chris Whitaker; Joe Woodley
- Home stadium: Jack Trice Stadium

2003 Big 12 Conference football standings
	Conf.			Overall
Team	W		L	W		L
North Division
No. 14 Kansas State x$	6	–	2	11	–	4
No. 19 Nebraska	5	–	3	10	–	3
Missouri	4	–	4	8	–	5
Kansas	3	–	5	6	–	7
Colorado	3	–	5	5	–	7
Iowa State	0	–	8	2	–	10
South Division
No. 3 Oklahoma x%	8	–	0	12	–	2
No. 12 Texas	7	–	1	10	–	3
Oklahoma State	5	–	3	9	–	4
Texas Tech	4	–	4	8	–	5
Texas A&M	2	–	6	4	–	8
Baylor	1	–	7	3	–	9
Championship: Kansas State 35, Oklahoma 7
$ – BCS representative as conference champion; % – BCS at-large representative; x – Division champion/co-champions; Rankings from AP Poll

The 2003 Iowa State Cyclones football team represented Iowa State University as a member of the North Division in the Big 12 Conference during the 2003 NCAA Division I-A football season. Led by ninth-year head coach Dan McCarney, the Cyclones compiled an overall record of 2–10 with a mark of 0–8 in conference play, placing last out of six teams in the Big 12's North Division. The team played home games at Jack Trice Stadium in Ames, Iowa.

== Schedule ==
Date	Time	Opponent	Site	TV	Result	Attendance
August 30	6:00 p.m.	Northern Iowa*	Jack Trice Stadium; Ames, IA		W 17–10	48,088
September 6	1:00 p.m.	Ohio*	Jack Trice Stadium; Ames, IA		W 48–20	40,056
September 13	11:30 a.m.	No. 23 Iowa*	Jack Trice Stadium; Ames, IA (rivalry)	FSN	L 21–40	53,486
September 27	3:05 p.m.	at No. 20 Northern Illinois*	Huskie Stadium; DeKalb, IL		L 16–24	28,218
October 4	6:00 p.m.	No. 1 Oklahoma	Jack Trice Stadium; Ames, IA	TBS	L 7–53	49,670
October 11	6:00 p.m.	at Texas Tech	Jones SBC Stadium; Lubbock, TX		L 21–52	49,627
October 18	11:30 a.m.	No. 20 Texas^{†}	Jack Trice Stadium; Ames, IA	PPV	L 19–40	45,355
October 25	11:30 a.m.	at No. 14 Nebraska	Memorial Stadium; Lincoln, NE (rivalry)	PPV	L 0–28	77,483
November 8	1:00 p.m.	Kansas State	Jack Trice Stadium; Ames, IA (rivalry)		L 0–45	40,124
November 15	1:00 p.m.	Colorado	Jack Trice Stadium; Ames, IA		L 10–44	36,977
November 22	1:00 p.m.	at Kansas	Memorial Stadium; Lawrence, KS		L 7–36	34,518
November 29	12:00 p.m.	at Missouri	Faurot Field; Columbia, MO (rivalry)	ABC	L 7–45	46,435
*Non-conference game; ^{†}Homecoming; Rankings from AP Poll released prior to the game; All times are in Central time

== Roster ==
2003 Iowa State Cyclones football team roster
Players
Coaches
Offense

Pos.	#	Name	Class
QB	8	Austin Flynn	Fr
WR	22	T. J. Klith	So
QB	16	Chris Love	Jr
QB	7	Bret Meyer	Fr
OL	65	Bob Montgomery	Sr
WR	83	Jamaul Montgomery	Sr

Defense

Pos.	#	Name	Class
DB	11	Ellis Hobbs	Jr
DB	42	Nick Linder	Sr
DB	3	Bryan Ollie	Sr
DL	96	Brent Nelson	Jr
CB	18	Marc Timmons	Sr
LB	45	Joe Woodley	Sr

Special teams

Pos.	#	Name	Class
P	14	Tony Yelk	Jr

Head coach

- Dan McCarney

Coordinators/assistant coaches

Legend

- (C) Team captain
- (S) Suspended
- (I) Ineligible
- Injured
- Redshirt

Roster
Last update: 2018-04-17
