= 2003 Colorado Buffaloes football team =

American college football season

2003 Colorado Buffaloes football
- Conference: Big 12
- North Division
- Record: 5–7 (3–5 Big 12)
- Head coach: Gary Barnett (5th season)
- Offensive coordinator: Shawn Watson (4th season)
- Offensive scheme: Multiple
- Defensive coordinator: Vince Okruch (5th season)
- Base defense: Multiple 4–2–5
- MVP: D. J. Hackett
- Captains: Marwan Hage; Medford Moorer; Bobby Purify; Sean Tufts
- Home stadium: Folsom Field

2003 Big 12 Conference football standings
	Conf.			Overall
Team	W		L	W		L
North Division
No. 14 Kansas State x$	6	–	2	11	–	4
No. 19 Nebraska	5	–	3	10	–	3
Missouri	4	–	4	8	–	5
Kansas	3	–	5	6	–	7
Colorado	3	–	5	5	–	7
Iowa State	0	–	8	2	–	10
South Division
No. 3 Oklahoma x%	8	–	0	12	–	2
No. 12 Texas	7	–	1	10	–	3
Oklahoma State	5	–	3	9	–	4
Texas Tech	4	–	4	8	–	5
Texas A&M	2	–	6	4	–	8
Baylor	1	–	7	3	–	9
Championship: Kansas State 35, Oklahoma 7
$ – BCS representative as conference champion; % – BCS at-large representative; x – Division champion/co-champions; Rankings from AP Poll

The 2003 Colorado Buffaloes football team represented the University of Colorado at Boulder during the 2003 NCAA Division I-A football season. The team played their home games at Folsom Field in Boulder, Colorado. They participated in the Big 12 Conference in the North Division. They were coached by head coach Gary Barnett. Colorado missed a bowl berth for just the fourth time since 1984.

== Schedule ==
Date	Time	Opponent	Rank	Site	TV	Result	Attendance	Source
August 30	5:45 pm	vs. No. 23 Colorado State*		Invesco Field at Mile High; Denver, CO (Rocky Mountain Showdown)	ESPN	W 42–35	76,219	
September 6	1:30 pm	UCLA*	No. 24	Folsom Field; Boulder, CO	ABC	W 16–14	48,584	
September 13	1:30 pm	Washington State*	No. 17	Folsom Field; Boulder, CO	PPV	L 26–47	48,146	
September 20	1:30 pm	at No. 10 Florida State*		Doak Campbell Stadium; Tallahassee, FL	ABC	L 7–47	83,294	
October 4	10:30 am	at Baylor		Floyd Casey Stadium; Waco, TX	FSN	L 30–42	23,147	
October 11	1:30 pm	Kansas		Folsom Field; Boulder, CO		W 50–47 ^{OT}	50,477	
October 18	1:10 pm	at Kansas State		KSU Stadium; Manhattan, KS (rivalry)		L 20–49	51,536	
October 25	5:00 pm	No. 1 Oklahoma^{†}		Folsom Field; Boulder, CO	TBS	L 20–34	54,215	
November 1	5:00 pm	at Texas Tech		Jones SBC Stadium; Lubbock, TX	FSN	L 21–26	52,908	
November 8	12:30 pm	No. 22 Missouri		Folsom Field; Boulder, CO		W 21–16	47,722	
November 15	1:00 pm	at Iowa State		Jack Trice Stadium; Ames, IA		W 44–10	36,977	
November 28	10:00 am	No. 25 Nebraska		Folsom Field; Boulder, CO (rivalry)	ABC	L 22–31	53,434	
*Non-conference game; ^{†}Homecoming; Rankings from AP Poll released prior to the game; All times are in Mountain time

== Game summaries ==
=== Colorado State ===
Team	1	2	3	4	Total
• Colorado	0	28	7	7	42
Colorado State	7	7	7	14	35

- Date: August 30
- Location: Invesco Field at Mile High, Denver, Colorado
- Game start: 5:45 p.m. MST
- TV announcers (ESPN): Ron Franklin (Play-by-play), Mike Gottfried (Color), & Adrian Karsten (Sideline)

Scoring summary
Q1		CSU	Van Pelt 10 yard run (Babcock kick)	CSU 7–0
Q2		COL	Purify 6 yard run (Crosby kick)	Tie 7–7
Q2		CSU	Pittman 32 yard pass from Van Pelt (Babcock kick)	CSU 14–7
Q2		COL	McCoy 82 yard pass from Klatt (Crosby kick)	Tie 14–14
Q2		COL	Hackett 10 yard pass from Klatt (Crosby kick)	COL 21–14
Q2		COL	Donahoe 45 yard pass from Klatt (Crosby kick)	COL 28–14
Q3		CSU	Pittman 38 yard pass from Van Pelt (Babcock kick)	COL 28–21
Q3		COL	McCoy 78 yard pass from Klatt (Crosby kick)	COL 35–21
Q4		CSU	Anderson 33 yard pass from Van Pelt (Babcock kick)	COL 35–28
Q4		CSU	Van Pelt 30 yard run (Babcock kick)	Tie 35–35
Q4	:40	COL	Purify 9 yard run (Crosby kick)	COL 42–35

Joel Klatt 21/34, 402 Yds (first start at QB)

=== Colorado ===
UCLA at Colorado

Team	1	2	3	4	Total
Bruins	0	7	7	0	14
• Buffaloes	7	3	0	6	16

- Date: September 4, 2004
- Location: Folsom Field, Boulder, Colorado
- Game start: 1:37 PM
- Elapsed time: 3:23
- Game attendance: 48,534
- Game weather: Cloudy, 77 °F (25 °C), 36% humidity, 6 mph (9.7 km/h) S
- Referee: C. Castleberry
- Television network: ABC

== Roster ==
2003 Colorado Buffaloes football team roster
Players
Coaches
Offense

Pos.	#	Name	Class
TB	2	Brian Calhoun	So
WR	4	Ron Monteilh	Jr
WR	6	Stephone Robinson	Fr
QB	7	Bernard Jackson	Fr
TB	8	Daniel Jolly	Fr
WR	9	Blake Mackey	Fr
QB	10	James Cox	Fr
QB	12	Brian White	Fr
QB	13	Erik Greenberg	So
QB	14	Joel Klatt	So
WR	15	Jeremy Bloom	So
QB	15	Colt Brennan	Fr
WR	17	Daniel Gonzales	Sr
QB	19	Ben Carpenter	Fr
TB	21	Brandon Caesar	Fr
WR	22	Brendan Egan	Fr
WR	23	Tyler Littlehales	Fr
RB	23	Sam Richmond	Fr
TB	29	Ryan Enright	Fr
TB	31	Isaiah Crawford	Fr
FB	32	J.P. diZerega	Jr
FB	34	Lawrence Vickers	So
WR	38	Barry Kunkel	Sr
TB	42	Bobby Purify (C)	Sr
FB	43	Brendan Schaub	Jr
FB	44	Chad Gardner	Sr
TE	45	Quinn Sypniewski	Sr
TE	46	Dan Goettsch	Fr
WR	47	Marcus Gonzales	So
WR	48	Nick Holz	Fr
OL	52	Derek Stemrich	Jr
OL	55	Mike Sutton	Fr
OL	58	Mark Fenton	Fr
OL	61	Edwin Harrison	Fr
OL	62	Marwan Hage (C)	Sr
OL	63	Jack Tipton	Fr
OL	64	Taylor Landry	Fr
OL	65	Del Scales	Fr
OL	66	Brian Daniels	Fr
OL	69	Karl Allis	Sr
OL	70	Kharylake Martin	Fr
OL	72	Drew Shader	So
OL	73	Clint O'Neal	So
OT	74	Sam Wilder	Jr
OL	75	Fredrick Staugh	Fr
OL	77	Tyler Polumbus	Fr
OL	78	Terrance Barreau	Jr
OL	79	Gary Moore	So
WR	80	Derek McCoy	Sr
WR	81	Mike Duren	Jr
WR	82	Evan Judge	So
WR	83	Dusty Sprague	Fr
TE	84	Jake Jones	Sr
TE	84	Joe Sanders	Fr
WR	85	John Donahoe	Sr
TE	86	Jesse Wallace	Jr
TE	87	Paul Creighton	Fr
WR	88	D. J. Hackett	Sr
TE	89	Joe Klopfenstein	So
WR	90	Matt Hammond	So

Defense

Pos.	#	Name	Class
CB	1	Sammy Joseph	Fr
CB	3	Marcus Moore	Sr
CB	4	Chris Russell	Fr
S	5	J. J. Billingsley	So
CB	6	Phil Jackson	Sr
CB	7	Vance Washington	So
ILB	12	Akarika Dawn	So
DE	13	Chadd Evans	Fr
S	16	Tom Hubbard	So
SS	17	Medford Moorer (C)	Sr
S	18	Dominique Brooks	Fr
S	18	Tyrone Henderson	Fr
SS	20	Clyde Surrell	Sr
CB	21	A. J. Anderson	So
CB	22	Lorenzo Sims	Fr
CB	25	Lionel Harris	Fr
CB	26	Terrence Wheatley	Fr
SS	27	Brian Iwuh	So
DE	30	Marques Harris	Sr
ILB	33	Walter Boye-Doe	Fr
S	35	Omar Stewart	Sr
S	37	Chad Cusworth	Fr
S	44	Kyle Griffith	So
DB	46	Justin Fallhowe	So
LB	49	Thaddaeus Washington	Fr
ILB	50	Chris Hollis	So
DE	51	Alex Ligon	Fr
ILB	53	Ben Kenney	Jr
ILB	54	Sean Tufts (C)	Sr
ILB	55	Jason Ackermann	Fr
ILB	56	John Martin	Fr
DE	60	Matt McChesney	Sr
DE	68	Matt Webb	Fr
DE	82	James Garee	So
DT	92	John Guydon	Jr
DT	93	Vaka Manupuna	So
DT	94	DeAndre Fluellen	Sr
DT	95	Nick Clement	So
DT	96	Marcus Jones	Fr
DE	97	Gabe Nyenhuis	Sr
DT	98	Brandon Dabdoub	Jr
DT	99	McKenzie Tilmon	Jr

Special teams

Pos.	#	Name	Class
K	16	Mason Crosby	Fr
P	29	John Torp	Jr
K	35	J.T. Eberly	Jr
P	37	J.P. Heaton	Fr
K	39	Kevin Eberhart	Fr
SN	59	Greg Pace	So

Head coach

- Gary Barnett

Coordinators/assistant coaches

- Dave Borbely – Offensive line
- Brian Cabral – Inside linebackers
- Ted Gilmore – Wide receivers
- David Hansburg – Coordinator of football operations
- Vance Joseph – Defensive backs
- Vince Okruch – Defensive coordinator
- Shawn Simms – Running backs
- Shawn Watson – Offensive coordinator/quarterbacks

Legend

- (C) Team captain
- (S) Suspended
- (I) Ineligible
- Injured
- Redshirt

Roster
