= 2003 Texas Tech Red Raiders football team =

American college football season

2003 Texas Tech Red Raiders football

Houston Bowl champion

Houston Bowl, W 38–14 vs. Navy
- Conference: Big 12 Conference
- South Division
- Record: 8–5 (4–4 Big 12)
- Head coach: Mike Leach (4th season)
- Offensive scheme: Air raid
- Defensive coordinator: Lyle Setencich (1st season)
- Base defense: 3–4
- Home stadium: Jones SBC Stadium

2003 Big 12 Conference football standings
	Conf.			Overall
Team	W		L	W		L
North Division
No. 14 Kansas State x$	6	–	2	11	–	4
No. 19 Nebraska	5	–	3	10	–	3
Missouri	4	–	4	8	–	5
Kansas	3	–	5	6	–	7
Colorado	3	–	5	5	–	7
Iowa State	0	–	8	2	–	10
South Division
No. 3 Oklahoma x%	8	–	0	12	–	2
No. 12 Texas	7	–	1	10	–	3
Oklahoma State	5	–	3	9	–	4
Texas Tech	4	–	4	8	–	5
Texas A&M	2	–	6	4	–	8
Baylor	1	–	7	3	–	9
Championship: Kansas State 35, Oklahoma 7
$ – BCS representative as conference champion; % – BCS at-large representative; x – Division champion/co-champions; Rankings from AP Poll

The 2003 Texas Tech Red Raiders football team represented Texas Tech University as a member of the Big 12 Conference during the 2003 NCAA Division I-A football season. In their fourth season under head coach Mike Leach, the Red Raiders compiled an 8–5 record (4–4 against Big 12 opponents), finished in fourth place in Southern Division of the Big 12, defeated Navy in the 2003 Houston Bowl, and outscored opponents by a combined total of 552 to 442. The team played its home games at Jones SBC Stadium in Lubbock, Texas.

Quarterback B. J. Symons totaled 5,833 passing yards and received the Sammy Baugh Trophy, and Wes Welker totaled 1,099 receiving yards and received the Mosi Tatupu Award.

Symons' 661 passing yards in the game against Ole Miss were the 3rd-most in FBS history at the time of the game.

== Schedule ==
Date	Time	Opponent	Site	TV	Result	Attendance
August 30	6:00 PM	SMU*	Jones SBC Stadium; Lubbock, TX		W 58–10	44,364
September 6	6:00 PM	New Mexico*	Jones SBC Stadium; Lubbock, TX		W 42–28	45,844
September 20	11:00 AM	at NC State*	Carter–Finley Stadium; Raleigh, NC	ESPN2	L 21–49	53,800
September 27	6:00 PM	at Ole Miss*	Vaught–Hemingway Stadium; Oxford, MS		W 49–45	54,649
October 4	9:00 PM	Texas A&M	Jones SBC Stadium; Lubbock, TX (rivalry)	FSN	W 59–28	51,772
October 11	6:00 PM	Iowa State^{†}	Jones SBC Stadium; Lubbock, TX		W 59–21	49,627
October 18	2:30 PM	at No. 23 Oklahoma State	Boone Pickens Stadium; Stillwater, OK	ABC	L 49–51	48,500
October 25	11:30 AM	at Missouri	Faurot Field; Columbia, MO	FSN	L 31–62	60,192
November 1	6:00 PM	Colorado	Jones SBC Stadium; Lubbock, TX	FSN	W 26–21	52,908
November 8	2:00 PM	at Baylor	Floyd Casey Stadium; Waco, TX (rivalry)		W 62–14	33,102
November 15	6:00 PM	at No. 7 Texas	Darrell K Royal–Texas Memorial Stadium; Austin, TX (rivalry)	FSN	L 40–43	83,596
November 22	2:30 PM	No. 1 Oklahoma	Jones SBC Stadium; Lubbock, TX	ABC	L 25–56	53,135
December 30	3:30 PM	vs. Navy*	Reliant Stadium; Houston, TX (Houston Bowl)	ESPN	W 38–14	51,068
*Non-conference game; ^{†}Homecoming; Rankings from AP Poll released prior to the game; All times are in Central time

== Game summaries ==
=== Texas A&M ===
Team	1	2	3	4	Total
Texas A&M	0	14	0	14	28
• Texas Tech	17	14	21	7	59

- Date: October 4
- Location: Jones AT&T Stadium, Lubbock, Texas
- Game start: 9:00 p.m. CST
- Game attendance: 51,772
- TV announcers (FSN): Bill Land (Play-by-play), Gary Reasons (Color) & Jim Knox (Sideline)

Scoring summary
1	12:29	TTU	Nehemiah Glover 17 yard pass from B.J. Symons (Keith Toogood kick)	Texas Tech 7–0
1	9:01	TTU	Nehemiah Glover 19 yard pass from B.J. Symons (Keith Toogood kick)	Texas Tech 14–0
1	1:37	TTU	Keith Toogood 21 yard field goal	Texas Tech 17–0
2	9:12	TA&M	Courtney Lewis 3 yard run (Todd Pegram kick)	Texas Tech 17–7
2	5:36	TTU	Wes Welker 48 yard pass from B.J. Symons (Keith Toogood kick)	Texas Tech 24–7
2	2:06	TA&M	Jamar Taylor 4 yard pass from Reggie McNeal (Todd Pegram kick)	Texas Tech 24–14
2	:51	TTU	Jarrett Hicks 13 yard pass from B.J. Symons (Keith Toogood kick)	Texas Tech 31–14
3	13:50	TTU	Taurean Henderson 14 yard pass from B.J. Symons (Keith Toogood kick)	Texas Tech 38–14
3	10:54	TTU	Nehemiah Glover 15 yard pass from B.J. Symons (Keith Toogood kick)	Texas Tech 45–14
3	2:38	TTU	Mickey Peters 8 yard pass from B.J. Symons (Keith Toogood kick)	Texas Tech 52–14
4	13:20	TA&M	Courtney Lewis 16 yard run (Todd Pegram kick)	Texas Tech 52–21
4	11:48	TTU	Wes Welker 16 yard pass from B.J. Symons (Keith Toogood kick)	Texas Tech 59–21
4	10:03	TA&M	L'Tydrick Riley 37 yard pass from Dustin Long (Todd Pegram kick)	Texas Tech 59–28

- B.J. Symons 34/46, 505 Yards, 8 TDs (Big 12 record)

=== Colorado ===
Team	1	2	3	4	Total
Colorado	14	0	0	7	21
• Texas Tech	0	12	14	0	26

- Date: November 1
- Location: Jones AT&T Stadium, Lubbock, Texas
- Game start: 6:00 p.m. CST
- Game attendance: 52,908
- TV announcers (FSN): Bill Land (Play-by-play), Gary Reasons (Color) & Jim Knox (Sideline)

Scoring summary
Q1	COL	McCoy 32 yard pass from Klatt (Crosby kick)	COL 7–0
Q1	COL	Jolly 1 yard run (Crosby kick)	COL 14–0
Q2	TTU	Toogood 37 yard field goal	COL 14–3
Q2	TTU	Welker 58 yard punt return (kick failed)	COL 14–9
Q2	TTU	Toogood 24 yard field goal	COL 14–12
Q3	TTU	Welker 13 yard pass from Symons (Toogood kick)	TTU 19–14
Q3	TTU	Henderson 10 yard run (Toogood kick)	TTU 26–14
Q4	COL	McCoy 8 yard pass from Klatt (Crosby kick)	TTU 26–21

== Roster ==
2003 Texas Tech Red Raiders football team roster
Players
Coaches
Offense

Pos.	#	Name	Class
QB	2	B. J. Symons	Sr
WR	6	Nehemiah Glover	Jr
RB	19	Taurean Henderson	So
WR	27	Wes Welker	Sr
OL	64	Cody Campbell	Jr
OL	65	Casey Keck	Sr
C	66	Toby Cecil	Sr
OL	67	Bryan Kegans	So
OL	75	E.J. Whitley	So
OL	77	Dylan Gandy	Jr
WR	82	Carlos Francis	Sr
WR	88	Jarrett Hicks	Fr

Defense

Pos.	#	Name	Class
DB	28	Ryan Aycock	Sr

Special teams

Pos.	#	Name	Class
K	37	Ryan Bishop	Jr
K	40	Keith Toogood	Fr

Head coach

- Mike Leach

Coordinators/assistant coaches

Legend

- (C) Team captain
- (S) Suspended
- (I) Ineligible
- Injured
- Redshirt
