= 2003 Baylor Bears football team =

American college football season

2003 Baylor Bears football
- Conference: Big 12 Conference
- South Division
- Record: 3–9 (1–7 Big 12)
- Head coach: Guy Morriss (1st season)
- Offensive coordinator: Brent Pease (1st season)
- Offensive scheme: Pro set
- Defensive coordinator: John Goodner (2nd season)
- Base defense: 4–2
- Home stadium: Floyd Casey Stadium

2003 Big 12 Conference football standings
	Conf.			Overall
Team	W		L	W		L
North Division
No. 14 Kansas State x$	6	–	2	11	–	4
No. 19 Nebraska	5	–	3	10	–	3
Missouri	4	–	4	8	–	5
Kansas	3	–	5	6	–	7
Colorado	3	–	5	5	–	7
Iowa State	0	–	8	2	–	10
South Division
No. 3 Oklahoma x%	8	–	0	12	–	2
No. 12 Texas	7	–	1	10	–	3
Oklahoma State	5	–	3	9	–	4
Texas Tech	4	–	4	8	–	5
Texas A&M	2	–	6	4	–	8
Baylor	1	–	7	3	–	9
Championship: Kansas State 35, Oklahoma 7
$ – BCS representative as conference champion; % – BCS at-large representative; x – Division champion/co-champions; Rankings from AP Poll

The 2003 Baylor Bears football team (variously "Baylor", "BU", or the "Bears") represented Baylor University in the 2003 NCAA Division I-A football season. They were represented in the Big 12 Conference in the South Division. They played their home games at Floyd Casey Stadium in Waco, Texas. They were coached by head coach Guy Morriss.

== Schedule ==
Date	Time	Opponent	Site	TV	Result	Attendance	Source
August 30	6:00 p.m.	UAB*	Floyd Casey Stadium; Waco, TX		L 19–24	28,732	
September 6	7:00 p.m.	at North Texas*	Fouts Field; Denton, TX		L 14–52	29,437	
September 13	6:00 p.m.	SMU*	Floyd Casey Stadium; Waco, TX		W 10–7	30,256	
September 20	6:00 p.m.	Sam Houston State*	Floyd Casey Stadium; Waco, TX		W 27–6	27,842	
October 4	11:30 a.m.	Colorado	Floyd Casey Stadium; Waco, TX	FSN	W 42–30	23,147	
October 11	12:30 p.m.	at Texas A&M	Kyle Field; College Station, TX (Battle of the Brazos)		L 10–73	73,030	
October 18	1:00 p.m.	at Kansas	Memorial Stadium; Lawrence, KS		L 21–28	40,088	
October 25	6:00 p.m.	No. 18 Texas	Floyd Casey Stadium; Waco, TX (rivalry)		L 0–56	42,118	
November 1	1:00 p.m.	at Kansas State	KSU Stadium; Manhattan, KS		L 10–38	44,885	
November 8	2:00 p.m.	Texas Tech^{†}	Floyd Casey Stadium; Waco, TX (rivalry)		L 14–62	33,102	
November 15	1:30 p.m.	at No. 1 Oklahoma	Gaylord Family Oklahoma Memorial Stadium; Norman, OK		L 3–41	82,117	
November 22	11:30 a.m.	No. 24 Oklahoma State	Floyd Casey Stadium; Waco, TX	FSN	L 21–38	23,763	
*Non-conference game; ^{†}Homecoming; Rankings from AP Poll released prior to the game; All times are in Central time
