= 2003 Kansas Jayhawks football team =

American college football season

2003 Kansas Jayhawks football

Tangerine Bowl, L 26–56 vs. NC State
- Conference: Big 12 Conference
- North
- Record: 6–7 (3–5 Big 12)
- Head coach: Mark Mangino (2nd season)
- Offensive coordinator: Nick Quartaro (2nd season)
- Defensive coordinator: Bill Young (2nd season)
- Home stadium: Memorial Stadium (Capacity: 50,071)

2003 Big 12 Conference football standings
	Conf.			Overall
Team	W		L	W		L
North Division
No. 14 Kansas State x$	6	–	2	11	–	4
No. 19 Nebraska	5	–	3	10	–	3
Missouri	4	–	4	8	–	5
Kansas	3	–	5	6	–	7
Colorado	3	–	5	5	–	7
Iowa State	0	–	8	2	–	10
South Division
No. 3 Oklahoma x%	8	–	0	12	–	2
No. 12 Texas	7	–	1	10	–	3
Oklahoma State	5	–	3	9	–	4
Texas Tech	4	–	4	8	–	5
Texas A&M	2	–	6	4	–	8
Baylor	1	–	7	3	–	9
Championship: Kansas State 35, Oklahoma 7
$ – BCS representative as conference champion; % – BCS at-large representative; x – Division champion/co-champions; Rankings from AP Poll

The 2003 Kansas Jayhawks football team represented the University of Kansas in the 2003 NCAA Division I-A football season. They participated as members of the Big 12 Conference in the North Division. They were coached by head coach Mark Mangino and played their home games at Memorial Stadium in Lawrence, Kansas.

== Schedule ==
Date	Time	Opponent	Site	TV	Result	Attendance
August 30	6:00 p.m.	Northwestern*	Memorial Stadium; Lawrence, Kansas		L 20–28	27,775
September 6	6:00 p.m.	UNLV*	Memorial Stadium; Lawrence, Kansas		W 46–24	33,980
September 13	3:00 p.m.	at Wyoming*	War Memorial Stadium; Laramie, Wyoming		W 42–35	18,329
September 20	6:00 p.m.	Jacksonville State*	Memorial Stadium; Lawrence, Kansas		W 41–6	34,712
September 27	11:30 a.m.	No. 23 Missouri	Memorial Stadium; Lawrence, Kansas (Border War)	FSN	W 35–14	50,071
October 11	2:30 p.m.	at Colorado	Folsom Field; Boulder, Colorado		L 47–50 ^{OT}	50,477
October 18	1:00 p.m.	Baylor^{†}	Memorial Stadium; Lawrence, Kansas		W 28–21	40,088
October 25	1:10 p.m.	at Kansas State	KSU Stadium; Manhattan, Kansas (Sunflower Showdown)		L 6–42	51,614
November 1	12:30 p.m.	at Texas A&M	Kyle Field; College Station, Texas		L 33–45	68,487
November 8	2:30 p.m.	No. 19 Nebraska	Memorial Stadium; Lawrence, Kansas (rivalry)	FSN	L 3–24	50,107
November 15	1:00 p.m.	at Oklahoma State	Boone Pickens Stadium; Stillwater, Oklahoma		L 21–44	40,850
November 22	1:00 p.m.	Iowa State	Memorial Stadium; Lawrence, Kansas		W 36–7	34,518
December 22	4:30 p.m.	vs. NC State*	Citrus Bowl; Orlando, Florida (Tangerine Bowl)	ESPN	L 26–56	26,482
*Non-conference game; ^{†}Homecoming; Rankings from AP Poll released prior to the game; All times are in Central time

== Roster ==
2003 Kansas Jayhawks football team roster
Players
Coaches
Offense

Pos.	#	Name	Class
QB	4	Bill Whittemore	Sr
QB	14	Brian Luke	So

Defense

Pos.	#	Name	Class
LB	45	Kevin Kane	So
DE	92	David McMillan	Jr

Special teams

Pos.	#	Name	Class

Head coach

- Mark Mangino

Coordinators/assistant coaches

Legend

- (C) Team captain
- (S) Suspended
- (I) Ineligible
- Injured
- Redshirt

Roster
Last update: 2003-12-12
