= Davin Dennis =

American football player (born 1983)

Profile
- Position: Wide receiver

Personal information
- Born: September 24, 1983

Career information
- College: Kansas State University

Career history
- 2007-2008: San Jose Sabercats

Davin Dennis (born September 24, 1983) is a former All American Football League wide receiver for Team Michigan and a former Arena Football League wide receiver for the San Jose SaberCats.

== High school ==
Dennis attended Saint James High School in Saint James, Louisiana where he was a student and a standout in football. He was a first team All-District 9-3A selection, an All-Bayou selection, and an All-Metro selection, and the Louisiana Football Magazine named him as a first team All-State selection. He was also a teammate of New York Giants cornerback Corey Webster who played quarterback at the time. In 1999 as a junior Dennis was Webster's go-to receiver and managed to catch 61 passes for 1,031 yards and 14 touchdowns. Against E.D. White he caught 7 passes for 265 yards and 3 touchdowns, which earned him the WAFB High School Football Player of the Week award. He was also recognized by USA Today for having one of the best performances in Louisiana that week.

As a senior, he caught 45 passes for 970 yards and 13 touchdowns. In the season opener against rival school West St. John, Dennis had 6 catches for 47 yards and 3 touchdowns, returned an interception 60 yards for a score as time expired and also returned the opening kick-off 100 yards for the score which was unfortunately negated by a penalty. For his efforts, he was named River Parishes' Prep Player of the Week. He graduated from Saint James High School in 2001.

After being heavily recruited by universities such as San Diego State, Colorado and Mississippi State, Dennis eventually committed to Kansas State University in February 2001.

== College ==
In college Dennis played for Kansas State University from 2001-2005, where he was a three year starter. After redshirting in 2001 he hauled in 67 receptions for 934 yards and 7 touchdowns from 2002-2005. His shining moment came in the 2004 Tostitos Fiesta Bowl when Kansas State faced Ohio State. Dennis caught 7 passes for 113 yards in a 35-28 loss to the buckeyes. That season Kansas State won the Big 12 Conference title with a stunning 35-7 upset over then #1 ranked Oklahoma Sooners. Dennis played a key role that season and it would prove to his best season when he had 22 catches for 404 yards and 4 touchdowns. He went on to finish his senior season, graduating in 2005 with a Bachelor's Degree in Social Sciences.
