= 2004 NFL draft =

2004 American football draft

General information
- Date: April 24–25, 2004
- Location: Theater at MSG in New York City
- Networks: ESPN, ESPN2

Overview
- 255 total selections in 7 rounds
- League: NFL
- First selection: Eli Manning, QB; San Diego Chargers
- Mr. Irrelevant: Andre Sommersell, LB; Oakland Raiders
- Most selections (13): Tennessee Titans
- Fewest selections (4): Washington Redskins
- Hall of Famers: 2: WR Larry Fitzgerald; DE Jared Allen

The 2004 NFL draft was the procedure by which National Football League teams selected amateur college football players. It is officially known as the NFL Annual Player Selection Meeting. The draft was held from April 24–25, 2004, at the Theater at Madison Square Garden in New York City. No teams chose to claim any players in the supplemental draft that year.

The draft was shown on ESPN both days and eventually moved to ESPN2 both days. The draft began with the San Diego Chargers selecting Mississippi quarterback Eli Manning with the first overall selection. Due to his refusal to play for the Chargers, Manning was later traded to the New York Giants for the fourth overall pick Philip Rivers of NC State. There were 32 compensatory selections distributed among 16 teams, with the Eagles, Rams and Jets each receiving four compensatory picks. Seven wide receivers were selected in the first round, a draft record later tied in 2024. Another record set by the draft was the most trades in the first round, with 28 trades. The University of Miami set an NFL record for the most first-rounders drafted with six, which would be tied by Alabama in 2021. Ohio State set an NFL draft record having 14 total players selected through all rounds. It was the first draft to have produced two quarterbacks who each won multiple Super Bowls, with Ben Roethlisberger and Manning each winning two.

The 255 players chosen in the draft comprised:

- 32 wide receivers
- 29 cornerbacks
- 28 linebackers
- 26 offensive tackles
- 24 defensive ends
- 22 defensive tackles
- 19 safeties
- 17 quarterbacks
- 16 tight ends
- 14 running backs
- 9 centers
- 8 guards
- 4 fullbacks
- 3 kickers
- 3 punters
- 1 nose tackle

== Player selections ==
| * | = compensatory selection |
| ^ | = supplemental compensatory selection |
| ¤ | = extra selection awarded to expansion team |
| † | = Pro Bowler (Note: Players are identified as Pro Bowlers if they were selected for the Pro Bowl at any time in their career.) |
| ‡ | = Hall of Famer (Note: Players are identified as a Hall of Famer if they have been inducted into the Pro Football Hall of Fame.) |

Positions key
| Offense | Defense | Special teams |
|---|---|---|
| QB — Quarterback; RB — Running back; FB — Fullback; WR — Wide receiver; TE — Tight end; OL — Offensive lineman; T — Tackle; G — Guard; C — Center | DL — Defensive lineman; DT — Defensive tackle (Note: Includes nose tackle (NT)); DE — Defensive end; EDGE — Edge rusher; LB — Linebacker (Note: Includes middle linebacker (MLB/MIKE), weakside linebacker (WILL), strongside linebacker (SAM), off-ball linebacker, and outside linebacker (OLB)); DB — Defensive back; CB — Cornerback; S — Safety (Note: Includes free safety (FS) and strong safety (SS)) | K — Kicker (Note: Also known as a placekicker (PK)); P — Punter; LS — Long snapper; RS — Return specialist (Note: Includes kickoff and punt returners) |

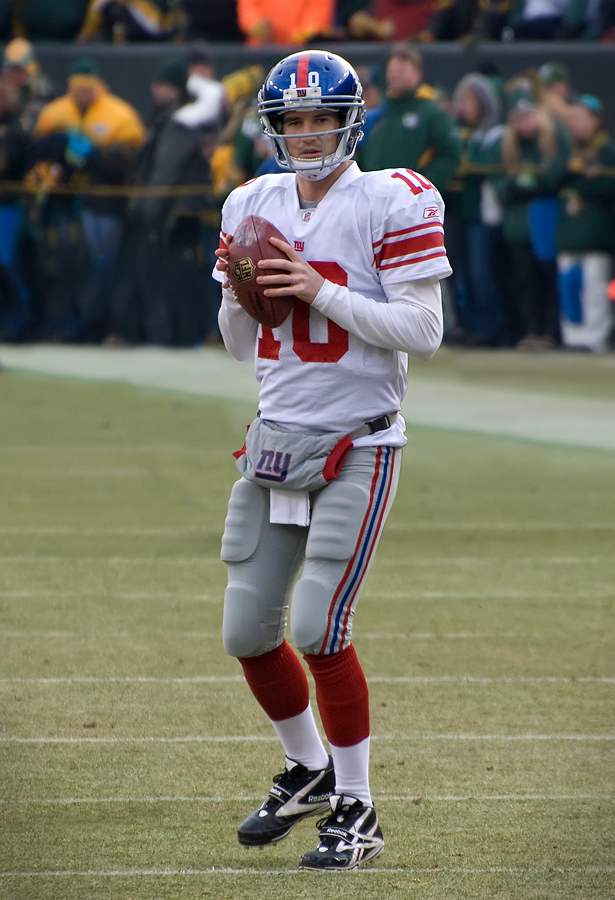
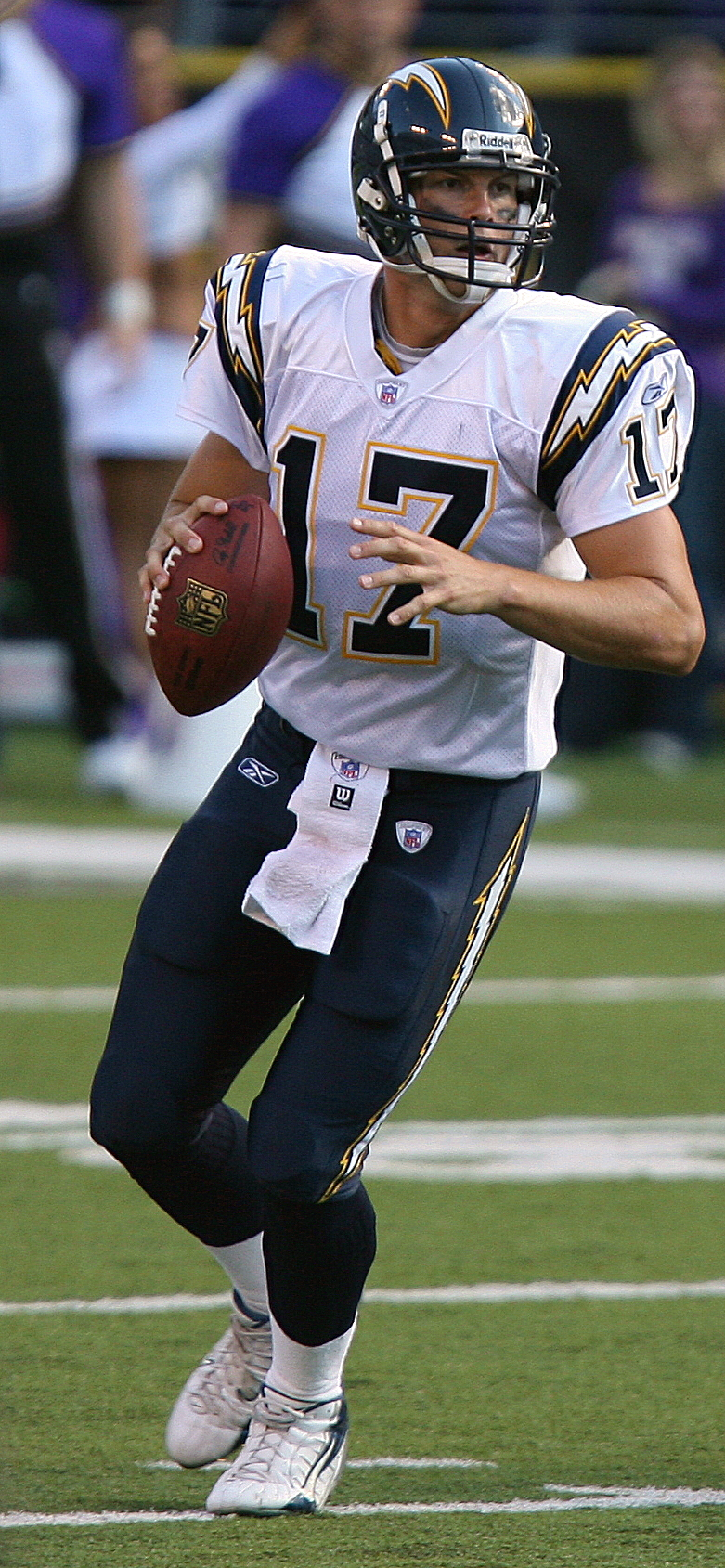
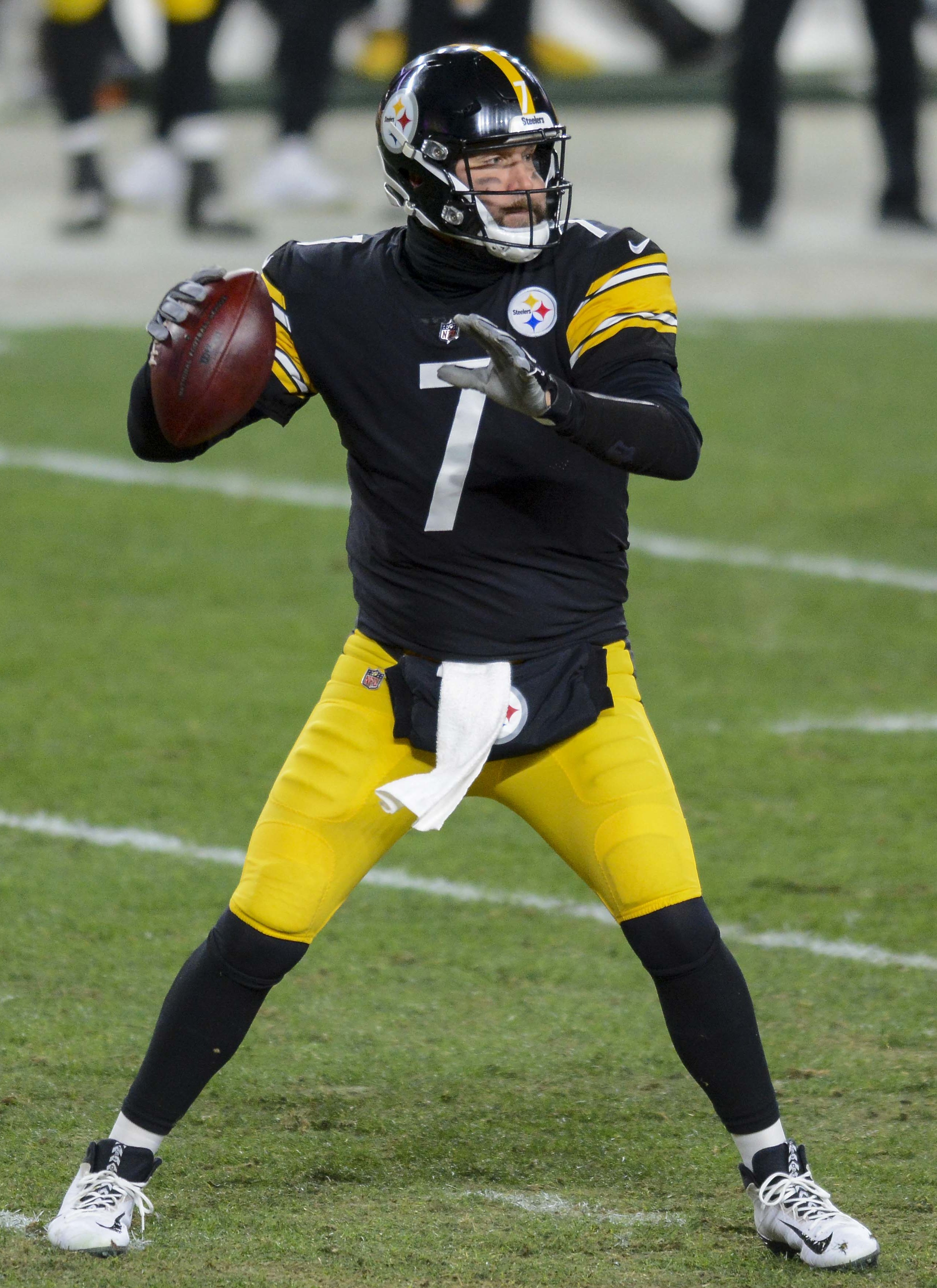
Quarterbacks Eli Manning, Philip Rivers and Ben Roethlisberger (top to bottom) each served as the franchise starters of their teams for nearly two decades.

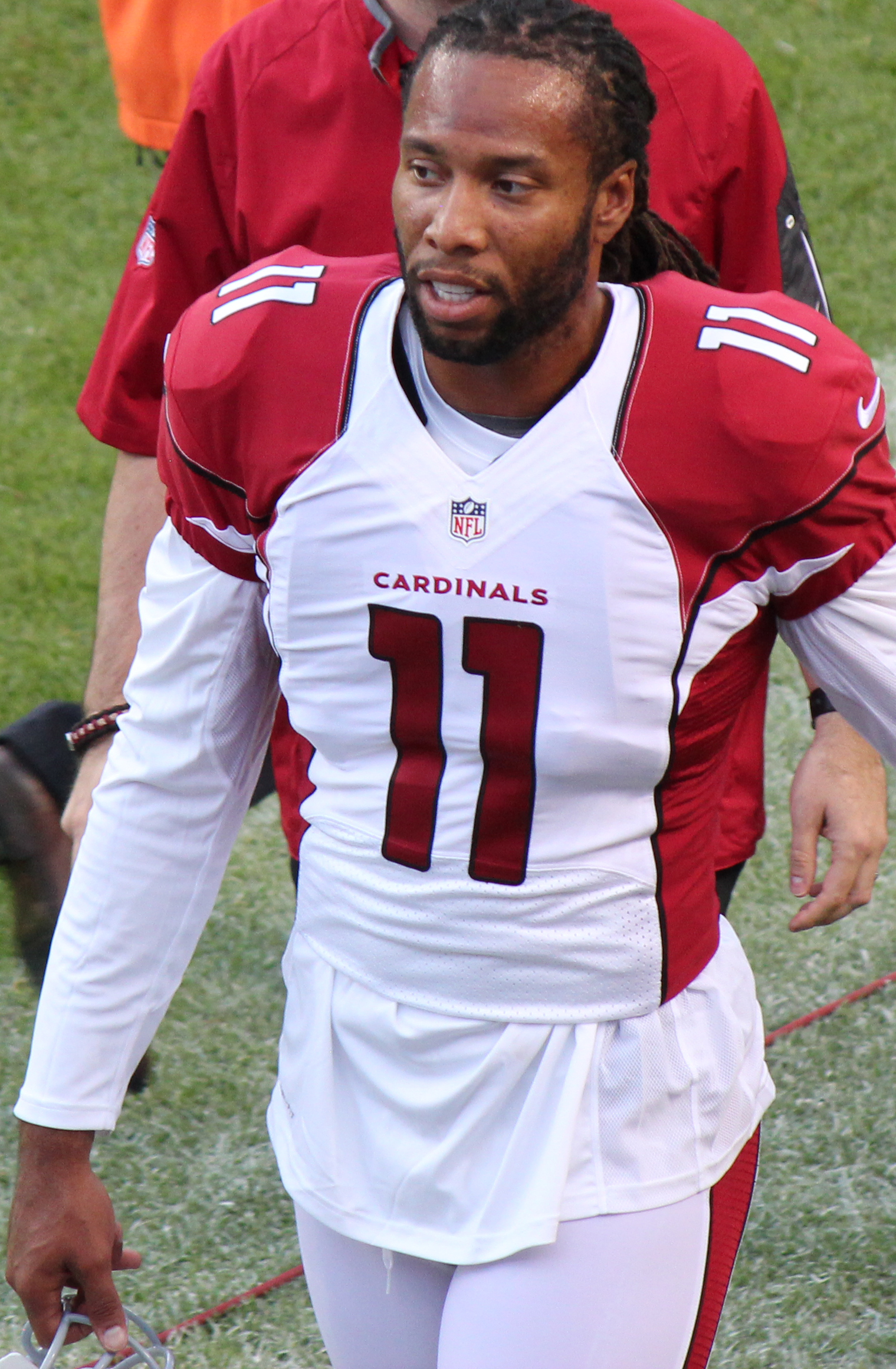
Wide receiver Larry Fitzgerald is second in NFL receiving yards and receptions.

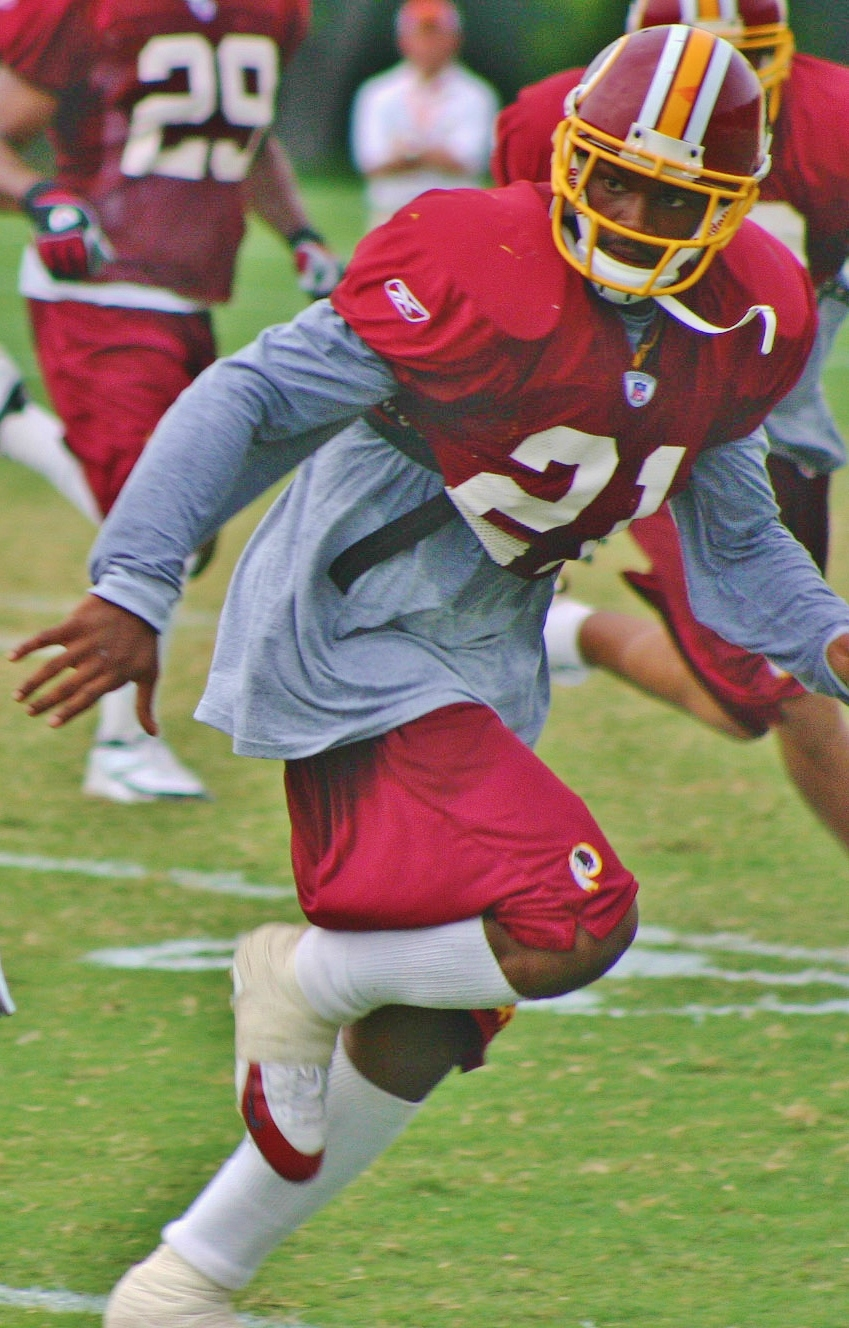
Murdered during his fourth season, safety Sean Taylor nonetheless established himself as a dominant and popular player.

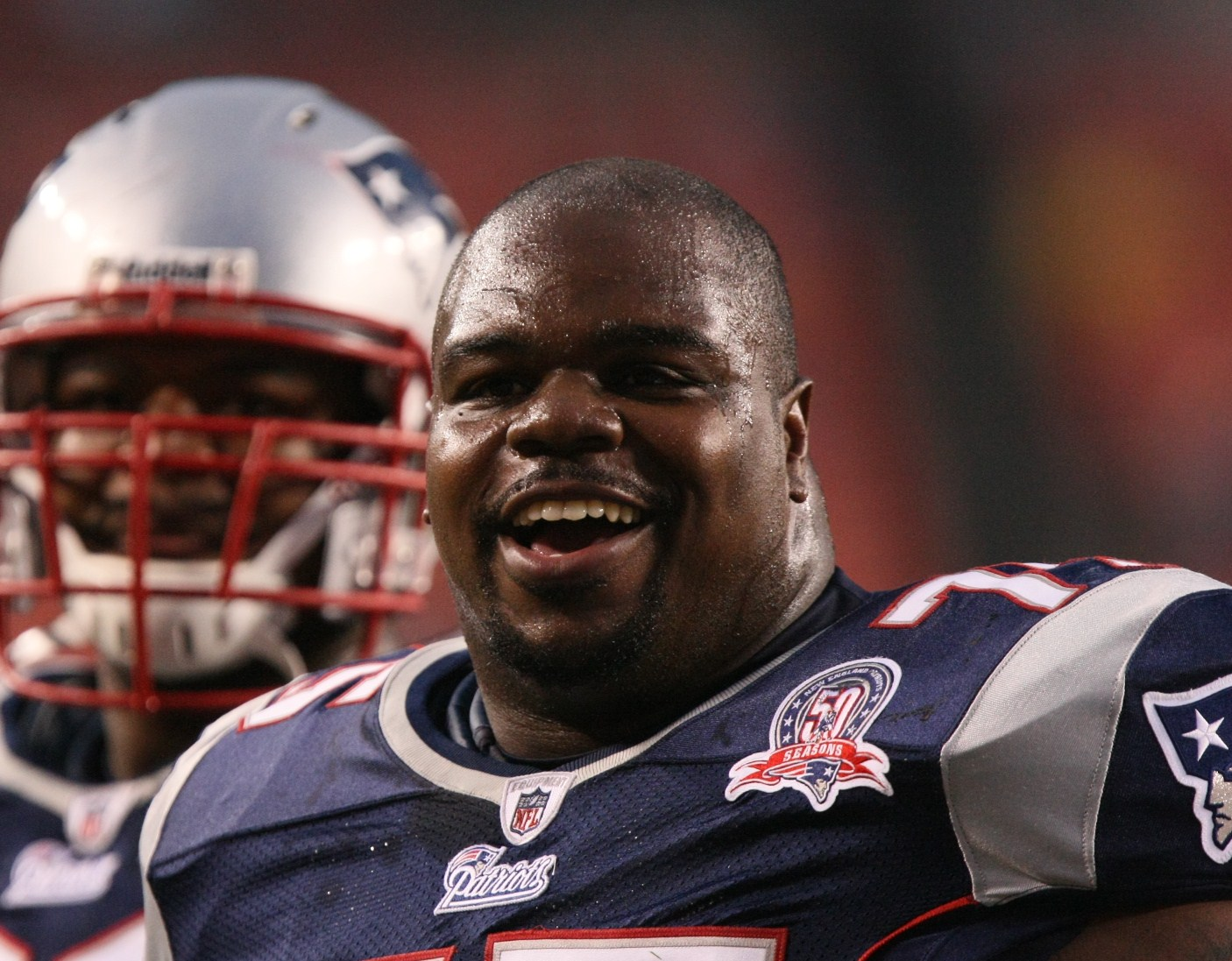
In a 13-season career, nose tackle Vince Wilfork made five Pro Bowls and won two Super Bowls.

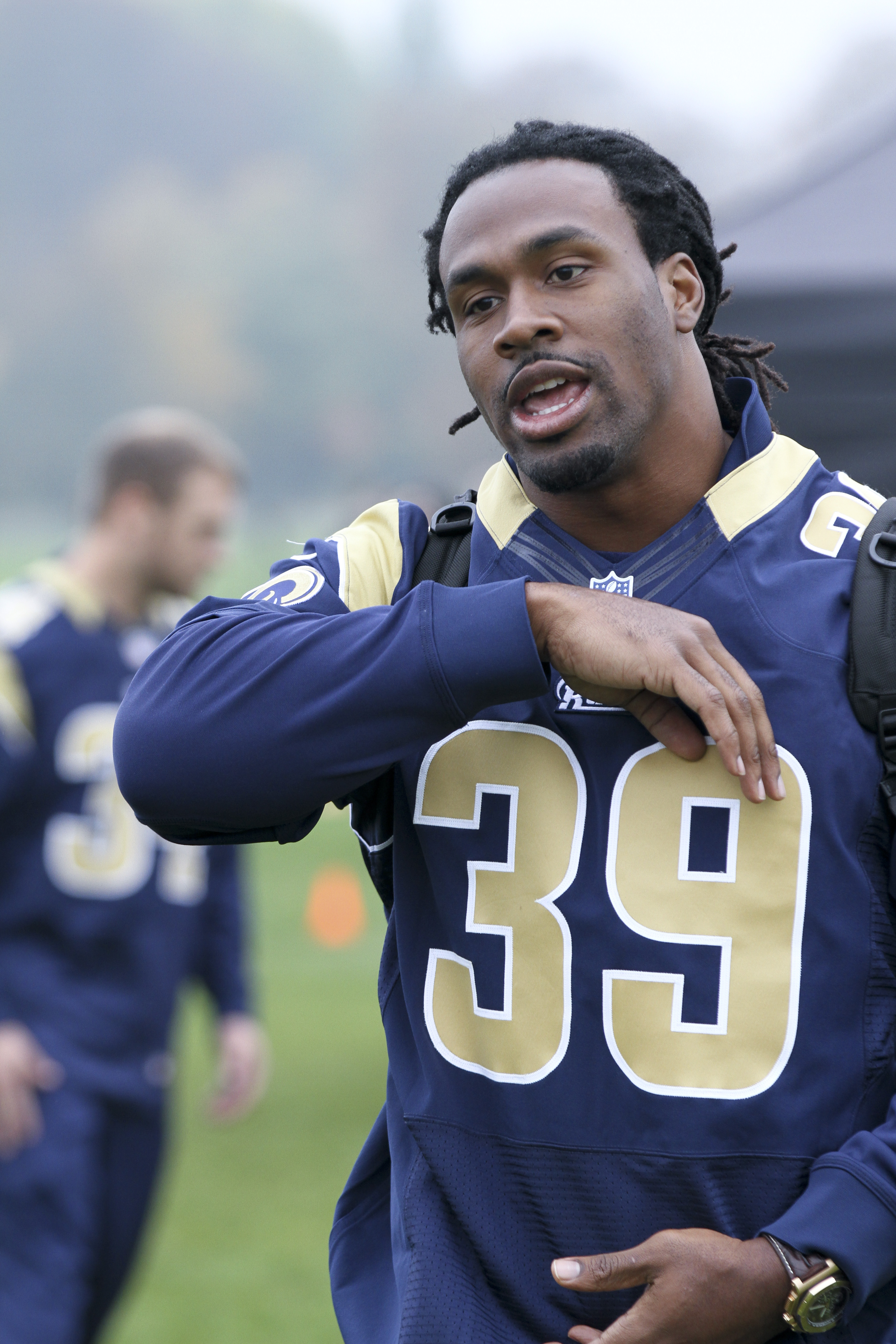
Running back Steven Jackson is the Rams' all-time leading rusher.

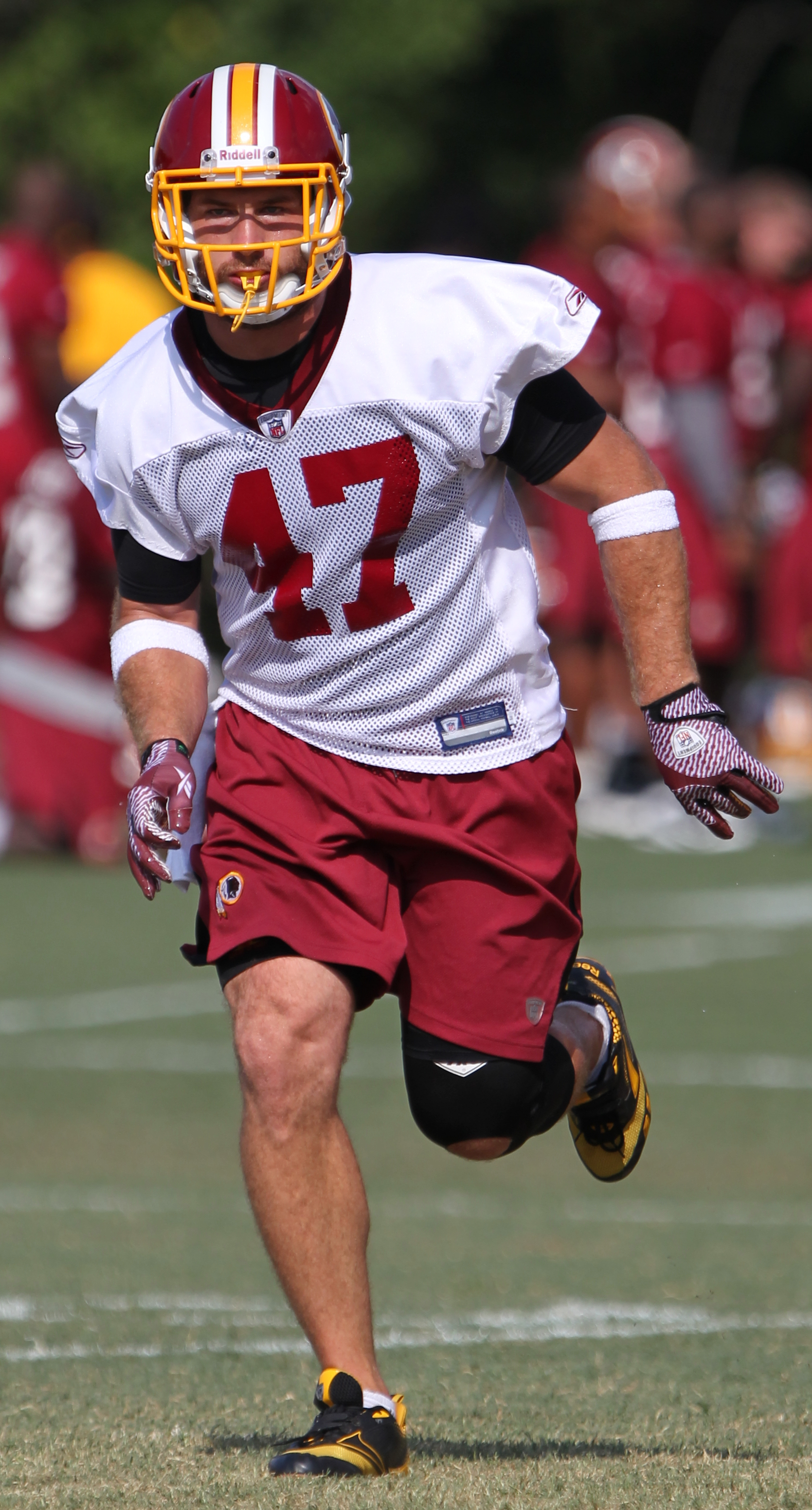
Chris Cooley has the most receptions by a tight end in Washington history.

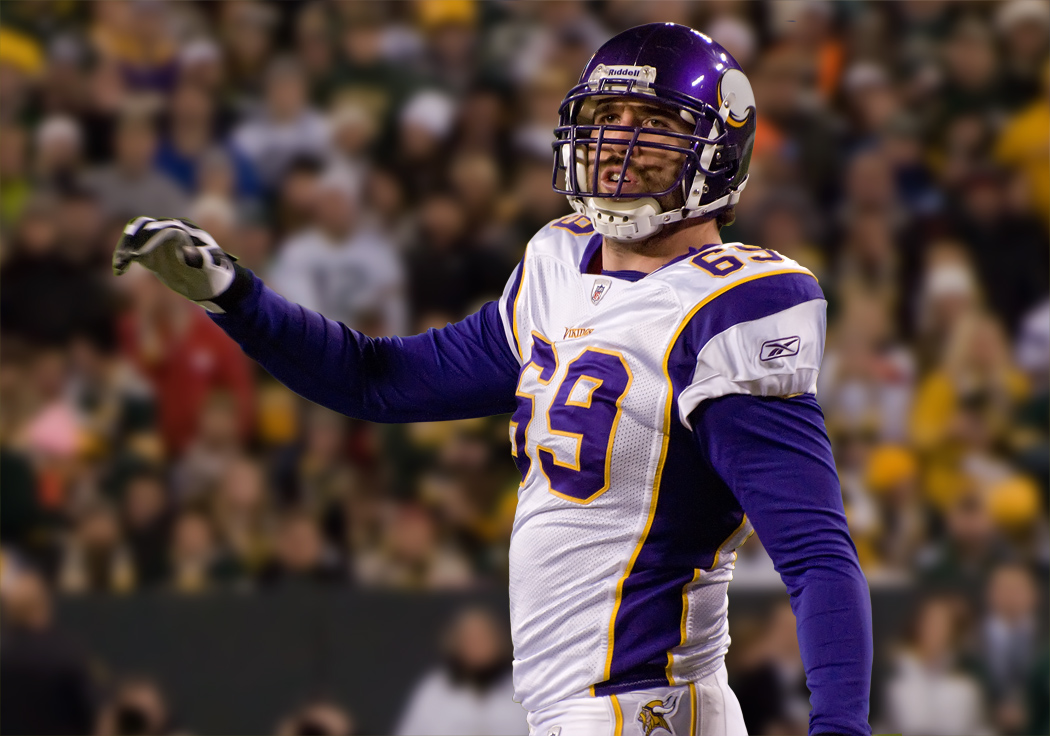
Defensive end Jared Allen twice led the league in sacks.

| Rnd. | Pick | Team | Player | Pos. | College | Notes |
|---|---|---|---|---|---|---|
| 1 | 1 | San Diego Chargers | Eli Manning ^{†} | QB | Ole Miss | traded to NY Giants (Note: No. 1: San Diego → NY Giants. San Diego traded Manning to the New York Giants in exchange for Philip Rivers and the Giants' third-round selection in this draft (#65) and their first- and fifth-round selections in 2005) |
| 1 | 2 | Oakland Raiders | Robert Gallery | T | Iowa | |
| 1 | 3 | Arizona Cardinals | Larry Fitzgerald^{‡}^{†} | WR | Pittsburgh | |
| 1 | 4 | New York Giants | Philip Rivers ^{†} | QB | NC State | traded to San Diego (Note: No. 4: NY Giants → San Diego (D). See No. 1: San Diego → NY Giants.) |
| 1 | 5 | Washington Redskins | Sean Taylor ^{†} | S | Miami (FL) | |
| 1 | 6 | Cleveland Browns | Kellen Winslow II ^{†} | TE | Miami (FL) | from Detroit (Note: No. 6: Detroit → Cleveland (D). Detroit traded a first-round selection (6th overall) to Cleveland in exchange for first- and second-round selections (7th and 37th overall).) |
| 1 | 7 | Detroit Lions | Roy Williams ^{†} | WR | Texas | from Cleveland (Note: No. 7: Cleveland → Detroit (D). See No. 6: Detroit → Cleveland.) |
| 1 | 8 | Atlanta Falcons | DeAngelo Hall ^{†} | CB | Virginia Tech | |
| 1 | 9 | Jacksonville Jaguars | Reggie Williams | WR | Washington | |
| 1 | 10 | Houston Texans | Dunta Robinson | CB | South Carolina | |
| 1 | 11 | Pittsburgh Steelers | Ben Roethlisberger ^{†} | QB | Miami (OH) | |
| 1 | 12 | New York Jets | Jonathan Vilma ^{†} | LB | Miami (FL) | |
| 1 | 13 | Buffalo Bills | Lee Evans | WR | Wisconsin | |
| 1 | 14 | Chicago Bears | Tommie Harris ^{†} | DT | Oklahoma | |
| 1 | 15 | Tampa Bay Buccaneers | Michael Clayton | WR | LSU | |
| 1 | 16 | Philadelphia Eagles | Shawn Andrews ^{†} | G | Arkansas | from San Francisco (Note: No. 16: San Francisco → Philadelphia (D). San Francisco traded a first-round selection (16th overall) to Philadelphia in exchange for first- and second-round selections (28th and 58th overall).) |
| 1 | 17 | Denver Broncos | D. J. Williams | LB | Miami (FL) | from Cincinnati (Note: No. 17: Cincinnati → Denver (D). Cincinnati traded a first-round selection (17th overall) to Denver in exchange for first- and fourth-round selections (24th and 117th overall), and CB Deltha O'Neal.) |
| 1 | 18 | New Orleans Saints | Will Smith ^{†} | DE | Ohio State | |
| 1 | 19 | Miami Dolphins | Vernon Carey | T | Miami (FL) | from Minnesota (Note: No. 19: Minnesota → Miami (D). Minnesota traded a first-round selection (19th overall) to Miami in exchange for first- and fourth-round selections (20th and 119th overall).) |
| 1 | 20 | Minnesota Vikings | Kenechi Udeze | DE | USC | from Miami (Note: No. 20: Miami → Minnesota (D). See No. 19: Minnesota → Miami.) |
| 1 | 21 | New England Patriots | Vince Wilfork ^{†} | NT | Miami (FL) | from Baltimore (Note: No. 21: Baltimore → New England (PD). Baltimore traded a first-round selection (21st overall) and a 2003 second-round selection to New England in exchange for a 2003 first-round selection.) |
| 1 | 22 | Buffalo Bills | J. P. Losman | QB | Tulane | from Dallas (Note: No. 22: Dallas → Buffalo (D). Dallas traded a first-round selection (22nd overall) to Buffalo in exchange for second- and fifth-round selections (43rd and 144th overall), and a 2005 first-round selection.) |
| 1 | 23 | Seattle Seahawks | Marcus Tubbs | DT | Texas | |
| 1 | 24 | St. Louis Rams | Steven Jackson ^{†} | RB | Oregon State | from Denver via Cincinnati (Note: No. 24: multiple trades: No. 24: Denver → Cincinnati (D). See No. 17: Cincinnati → Denver. No. 24: Cincinnati → St. Louis (D). Cincinnati traded a first-round selection (24th overall) to St. Louis in exchange for first- and fourth-round selections (26th and 123rd overall).) |
| 1 | 25 | Green Bay Packers | Ahmad Carroll | CB | Arkansas | |
| 1 | 26 | Cincinnati Bengals | Chris Perry | RB | Michigan | from St. Louis (Note: No. 26: St. Louis → Cincinnati (D). See No. 24: Cincinnati → St. Louis.) |
| 1 | 27 | Houston Texans | Jason Babin ^{†} | DE | Western Michigan | from Tennessee (Note: No. 27: Tennessee → Houston (D). Tennessee traded first- and fifth-round selections (27th and 159th overall) to Houston in exchange for second-, third-, fourth- and fifth-round selections (40th, 71st, 103rd and 138th overall).) |
| 1 | 28 | Carolina Panthers | Chris Gamble | CB | Ohio State | from Philadelphia via San Francisco (Note: No. 28: multiple trades: No. 28: Philadelphia → San Francisco (D). See No. 16: San Francisco → Philadelphia. No. 28: San Francisco → Carolina (D). San Francisco traded a first-round selection (28th overall) to Carolina in exchange for first- and fourth-round selections (31st and 127th overall).) |
| 1 | 29 | Atlanta Falcons | Michael Jenkins | WR | Ohio State | from Indianapolis (Note: No. 29: Indianapolis → Atlanta (D). Indianapolis traded first- and third-round selections (29th and 90th overall) to Atlanta in exchange for second-, third- and fourth-round selections (38th, 69th and 125th overall).) |
| 1 | 30 | Detroit Lions | Kevin Jones | RB | Virginia Tech | from Kansas City (Note: No. 30: Kansas City → Detroit (D). Kansas City traded a first-round selection (30th overall) to Detroit in exchange for second- and fourth-round selections (36th and 105th overall), and a 2005 fifth-round selection.) |
| 1 | 31 | San Francisco 49ers | Rashaun Woods | WR | Oklahoma State | from Carolina (Note: No. 31: Carolina → San Francisco (D). See No. 28: San Francisco → Carolina.) |
| 1 | 32 | New England Patriots | Benjamin Watson | TE | Georgia | |
| 2 | – | Oakland Raiders | Oakland traded a second-round selection to Houston in exchange for 2003 third- and seventh-round selections. Houston then forfeited the pick by selecting RB Tony Hollings in the 2003 supplemental draft | | | |
| 2 | 33 | Arizona Cardinals | Karlos Dansby | LB | Auburn | |
| 2 | 34 | New York Giants | Chris Snee ^{†} | G | Boston College | |
| 2 | 35 | San Diego Chargers | Igor Olshansky | DT | Oregon | |
| 2 | 36 | Kansas City Chiefs | Junior Siavii | DT | Oregon | from Detroit (Note: No. 36: Detroit → Kansas City (D). See No. 30: Kansas City → Detroit.) |
| 2 | 37 | Detroit Lions | Teddy Lehman | LB | Oklahoma | from Cleveland (Note: No. 37: Cleveland → Detroit (D). See No. 6: Detroit → Cleveland.) |
| 2 | 38 | Pittsburgh Steelers | Ricardo Colclough | CB | Tusculum | from Atlanta via Indianapolis (Note: No. 38: multiple trades: No. 38: Atlanta → Indianapolis (D). See No. 29: Atlanta → Indianapolis. No. 38: Indianapolis → Pittsburgh (D). Indianapolis traded a second-round selection (38th overall) to Pittsburgh in exchange for Pittsburgh's second- and fourth-round selections (44th and 107th).) |
| 2 | 39 | Jacksonville Jaguars | Daryl Smith | LB | Georgia Tech | |
| 2 | 40 | Tennessee Titans | Ben Troupe | TE | Florida | from Houston (Note: No. 40: Houston → Tennessee (D). See No. 27: Tennessee → Houston.) |
| 2 | 41 | Denver Broncos | Tatum Bell | RB | Oklahoma State | from Washington (Note: No. 41: Washington → Denver (PD). Washington traded a second-round selection (41st overall) and CB Champ Bailey to Denver in exchange for RB Clinton Portis.) |
| 2 | 42 | Tennessee Titans | Travis LaBoy | DE | Hawaii | from NY Jets (Note: No. 42: NY Jets → Tennessee (PD). The NY Jets traded a second-round selection (42nd overall) to Tennessee in exchange for WR Justin McCareins.) |
| 2 | 43 | Dallas Cowboys | Julius Jones | RB | Notre Dame | from Buffalo (Note: No. 43: Buffalo → Dallas (D). See No. 22: Dallas → Buffalo.) |
| 2 | 44 | Indianapolis Colts | Bob Sanders ^{†} | SS | Iowa | from Pittsburgh (Note: No. 44: Pittsburgh → Indianapolis (D). See No. 38: Indianapolis → Pittsburgh.) |
| 2 | 45 | Oakland Raiders | Jake Grove | C | Virginia Tech | from Tampa Bay (Note: No. 45: Tampa Bay → Oakland (PD). Tampa Bay traded a second-round selection (45th overall), 2002 first- and second-round selections, and a 2003 first-round selection to Oakland as compensation for signing Raiders head coach Jon Gruden.) |
| 2 | 46 | San Francisco 49ers | Justin Smiley | G | Alabama | |
| 2 | 47 | Chicago Bears | Tank Johnson | DT | Washington | |
| 2 | 48 | Minnesota Vikings | Dontarrious Thomas | LB | Auburn | from New Orleans (Note: No. 48: New Orleans → Minnesota (D). New Orleans traded a second-round selection (48th overall) to Minnesota in exchange for second- and fifth-round selections (60th and 151st overall).) |
| 2 | 49 | Cincinnati Bengals | Keiwan Ratliff | CB | Florida | |
| 2 | 50 | New Orleans Saints | Devery Henderson | WR | LSU | from Minnesota (Note: No. 50: New Orleans → Minnesota (D). See No. 48: New Orleans → Minnesota.) |
| 2 | 51 | Baltimore Ravens | Dwan Edwards | DT | Oregon State | from Baltimore via San Francisco |
| 2 | 52 | Dallas Cowboys | Jacob Rogers | T | USC | |
| 2 | 53 | Seattle Seahawks | Michael Boulware | SS | Florida State | |
| 2 | 54 | Denver Broncos | Darius Watts | WR | Marshall | |
| 2 | 55 | Jacksonville Jaguars | Greg Jones | RB | Florida State | from Green Bay Packers (Note: No. 55: Green Bay → Jacksonville (D). Green Bay Packers traded a second-round selection (55th overall) to Jacksonville in exchange for third- and fourth-round selections (70th and 102nd overall).) |
| 2 | 56 | Cincinnati Bengals | Madieu Williams | FS | Maryland | from Miami via New England (Note: No. 56: multiple trades: No. 56: Miami → New England (PD). Miami traded a second-round selection (56th overall) to New England in exchange for a 2003 third-round selection. No. 56: New England → Cincinnati (PD). New England traded a second-round selection (56th overall) to Cincinnati in exchange for RB Corey Dillon.) |
| 2 | 57 | Tennessee Titans | Antwan Odom | DE | Alabama | |
| 2 | 58 | San Francisco 49ers | Shawntae Spencer | CB | Pittsburgh | from Philadelphia (Note: No. 58: Philadelphia → San Francisco (D). See No. 16: San Francisco → Philadelphia.) |
| 2 | 59 | Cleveland Browns | Sean Jones | FS | Georgia | from Indianapolis (Note: No. 59: Indianapolis → Cleveland (D). Indianapolis traded second- and fifth-round selections (59th and 161st overall) to Cleveland in exchange for third-, fifth- and sixth-round selections (68th, 141st and 173rd overall).) |
| 2 | 60 | New Orleans Saints | Courtney Watson | LB | Notre Dame | from St. Louis (Note: No. 60: St. Louis → New Orleans (PD). St. Louis traded a second-round selection (60th overall) to New Orleans in exchange for OT Kyle Turley.) |
| 2 | 61 | Kansas City Chiefs | Kris Wilson | TE | Pittsburgh | |
| 2 | 62 | Carolina Panthers | Keary Colbert | WR | USC | |
| 2 | 63 | New England Patriots | Marquise Hill | DE | LSU | |
| 3 | 64 | Arizona Cardinals | Darnell Dockett ^{†} | DT | Florida State | |
| 3 | 65 | San Diego Chargers | Nate Kaeding ^{†} | K | Iowa | from New York Giants (Note: No. 65: NY Giants → San Diego (D). The NY Giants traded a third-round selection (65th overall), 2005 first- and fifth-round selections, and QB Philip Rivers to San Diego in exchange for QB Eli Manning.) |
| 3 | 66 | San Diego Chargers | Nick Hardwick ^{†} | C | Purdue | |
| 3 | 67 | Oakland Raiders | Stuart Schweigert | FS | Purdue | |
| 3 | 68 | Indianapolis Colts | Ben Hartsock | TE | Ohio State | from Cleveland (Note: No. 68: Cleveland → Indianapolis (D). See No. 59: Indianapolis → Cleveland.) |
| 3 | 69 | Indianapolis Colts | Gilbert Gardner | LB | Purdue | from Atlanta (Note: No. 69: Atlanta → Indianapolis (D). See No. 29: Indianapolis → Atlanta.) |
| 3 | 70 | Green Bay Packers | Joey Thomas | CB | Montana State | from Jacksonville (Note: No. 70: Jacksonville → Green Bay (D). See No. 55: Green Bay → Jacksonville.) |
| 3 | 71 | Tennessee Titans | Randy Starks ^{†} | DT | Maryland | from Houston (Note: No. 71: Houston → Tennessee (D). See No. 27: Tennessee → Houston.) |
| 3 | 72 | Green Bay Packers | Donnell Washington | DT | Clemson | from Washington via Jacksonville (Note: No. 72: multiple trades: No. 72: Washington → Jacksonville (PD). Washington traded a third-round selection (72nd overall) to Jacksonville in exchange for QB Mark Brunell. No. 72: Jacksonville → Green Bay (D). Jacksonville traded a third-round selection (72nd overall) to Green Bay in exchange for third- and fourth-round selections (86th and 118th overall).) |
| 3 | 73 | Detroit Lions | Keith Smith | CB | McNeese State | |
| 3 | 74 | Buffalo Bills | Tim Anderson | DT | Ohio State | |
| 3 | 75 | Pittsburgh Steelers | Max Starks | T | Florida | |
| 3 | 76 | New York Jets | Derrick Strait | CB | Oklahoma | |
| 3 | 77 | San Francisco 49ers | Derrick Hamilton | WR | Clemson | |
| 3 | 78 | Chicago Bears | Bernard Berrian | WR | Fresno State | |
| 3 | 79 | Tampa Bay Buccaneers | Marquis Cooper | LB | Washington | |
| 3 | 80 | Cincinnati Bengals | Caleb Miller | LB | Arkansas | |
| 3 | 81 | Washington Redskins | Chris Cooley ^{†} | TE | Utah State | from New Orleans (Note: No. 81: New Orleans → Washington (D). New Orleans traded third- and fifth-round selections (81st and 151st overall) to Washington in exchange for a fifth-round selection (139th overall) and a 2005 second-round selection.) |
| 3 | 82 | Baltimore Ravens | Devard Darling | WR | Washington State | from Minnesota (Note: No. 82: Minnesota → Baltimore (D). Minnesota traded a third-round selection (82nd overall) to Baltimore in exchange for third- and fifth-round selections (88th and 155th overall).) |
| 3 | 83 | Dallas Cowboys | Stephen Peterman | G | LSU | |
| 3 | 84 | Seattle Seahawks | Sean Locklear | G | NC State | |
| 3 | 85 | Denver Broncos | Jeremy LeSueur | CB | Michigan | |
| 3 | 86 | Jacksonville Jaguars | Jorge Cordova | LB | Nevada | from Green Bay (Note: No. 86: Green Bay → Jacksonville (D). See No. 72: Jacksonville → Green Bay.) |
| 3 | 87 | Green Bay Packers | B. J. Sander | P | Ohio State | from Miami (Note: No. 87: Miami → Green Bay (D). Miami traded a third-round selection (87th overall) to Green Bay in exchange for fourth- and fifth-round selections (102nd and 153rd overall).) |
| 3 | 88 | Minnesota Vikings | Darrion Scott | DE | Ohio State | from Baltimore (Note: No. 88: Baltimore → Minnesota (D). See No. 82: Minnesota → Baltimore.) |
| 3 | 89 | Philadelphia Eagles | Matt Ware | FS | UCLA | |
| 3 | 90 | Atlanta Falcons | Matt Schaub ^{†} | QB | Virginia | from Indianapolis (Note: No. 90: Indianapolis → Atlanta (D). See No. 29: Indianapolis → Atlanta.) |
| 3 | 91 | St. Louis Rams | Anthony Hargrove | DE | Georgia Tech | |
| 3 | 92 | Tennessee Titans | Rich Gardner | CB | Penn State | |
| 3 | 93 | Kansas City Chiefs | Keyaron Fox | LB | Georgia Tech | |
| 3 | 94 | Carolina Panthers | Travelle Wharton | T | South Carolina | |
| 3 | 95 | New England Patriots | Guss Scott | SS | Florida | |
| 3* | 96 | Cincinnati Bengals | Landon Johnson | LB | Purdue | |
| 4 | 97 | New York Giants | Reggie Torbor | DE | Auburn | |
| 4 | 98 | San Diego Chargers | Shaun Phillips ^{†} | DE | Purdue | |
| 4 | 99 | Oakland Raiders | Carlos Francis | WR | Texas Tech | |
| 4 | 100 | Arizona Cardinals | Alex Stepanovich | C | Ohio State | |
| 4 | 101 | Atlanta Falcons | Demorrio Williams | LB | Nebraska | |
| 4 | 102 | Miami Dolphins | Will Poole | CB | USC | from Jacksonville via Green Bay (Note: No. 102: multiple trades: No. 102: Jacksonville → Green Bay (D). See No. 55: Green Bay → Jacksonville. No. 102: Green Bay → Miami (D). See No. 87: Miami → Green Bay.) |
| 4 | 103 | Tennessee Titans | Bo Schobel | DE | TCU | from Houston (Note: No. 103: Houston → Tennessee (D). See No. 27: Tennessee → Houston.) |
| 4 | 104 | San Francisco 49ers | Isaac Sopoaga | DT | Hawaii | from Washington via New England and Chicago (Note: No. 104: multiple trades: No. 104: Washington → New England (PD). Washington traded a fourth-round selection (104th overall) and a 2003 third-round selection to New England in exchange for 2003 third- and fifth-round selections. No. 104: New England → Chicago (PD). New England traded a fourth-round selection (104th overall) to Chicago in return for DT Ted Washington. No. 104: Chicago → San Francisco (D). Chicago traded a fourth-round selection (104th overall) to San Francisco in exchange for fourth- and fifth-round selections (112th and 147th overall).) |
| 4 | 105 | Kansas City Chiefs | Samie Parker | WR | Oregon | from Detroit (Note: No. 105: Detroit → Kansas City (D). See No. 30: Kansas City → Detroit.) |
| 4 | 106 | Cleveland Browns | Luke McCown | QB | Louisiana Tech | |
| 4 | 107 | Indianapolis Colts | Kendyll Pope | LB | Florida State | from Pittsburgh (Note: No. 107: Pittsburgh → Indianapolis (D). See No. 38: Indianapolis → Pittsburgh.) |
| 4 | 108 | New York Jets | Jerricho Cotchery | WR | NC State | |
| 4 | 109 | Buffalo Bills | Tim Euhus | TE | Oregon State | |
| 4 | 110 | Chicago Bears | Nathan Vasher ^{†} | CB | Texas | |
| 4 | 111 | Tampa Bay Buccaneers | Will Allen | FS | Ohio State | |
| 4 | 112 | Chicago Bears | Leon Joe | LB | Maryland | from San Francisco (Note: No. 112: San Francisco → Chicago (D). See No. 104: Chicago → San Francisco.) |
| 4 | 113 | New England Patriots | Dexter Reid | FS | North Carolina | from New Orleans (Note: No. 113: New Orleans → New England (PD). New Orleans traded a fourth-round selection (113th), and 2003 third- and seventh-round selections to New England in exchange for S Tebucky Jones.) |
| 4 | 114 | Cincinnati Bengals | Matthias Askew | DT | Michigan State | |
| 4 | 115 | Minnesota Vikings | Nat Dorsey | T | Georgia Tech | |
| 4 | 116 | Seattle Seahawks | Niko Koutouvides | LB | Purdue | |
| 4 | 117 | Cincinnati Bengals | Robert Geathers | DE | Georgia | from Denver. (Note: No. 117: Denver → Cincinnati (D). See No. 17: Cincinnati → Denver.) |
| 4 | 118 | Jacksonville Jaguars | Anthony Maddox | DT | Delta State | from Green Bay (Note: No. 118: Green Bay → Jacksonville (D). See No. 72: Jacksonville → Green Bay.) |
| 4 | 119 | Minnesota Vikings | Mewelde Moore | RB | Tulane | from Miami (Note: No. 119: Miami → Minnesota (D). See No. 19: Minnesota → Miami.) |
| 4 | 120 | Jacksonville Jaguars | Ernest Wilford | WR | Virginia Tech | from Baltimore (Note: No. 120: Baltimore → Jacksonville (D). Baltimore traded a fourth-round selection (120th overall) to Jacksonville in exchange for WR Kevin Johnson.) |
| 4 | 121 | Dallas Cowboys | Bruce Thornton | CB | Georgia | |
| 4 | 122 | Houston Texans | Glenn Earl | SS | Notre Dame | from Indianapolis (Note: No. 122: Indianapolis → Houston (PD). Indianapolis traded a fourth-round selection (122nd overall) to Houston in exchange for a 2003 fifth-round selection.) |
| 4 | 123 | Cincinnati Bengals | Stacy Andrews | T | Ole Miss | from St. Louis (Note: No. 123: St. Louis → Cincinnati (D). See No. 24: Cincinnati → St. Louis.) |
| 4 | 124 | Tennessee Titans | Michael Waddell | CB | North Carolina | |
| 4 | 125 | Indianapolis Colts | Jason David | CB | Washington State | from Philadelphia via Atlanta (Note: No. 125: multiple trades: No. 125: Philadelphia → Atlanta (PD). Philadelphia traded a fourth-round selection (125th overall) and a 2003 sixth-round selection to Atlanta in exchange for LB Mark Simoneau. No. 125: Atlanta → Indianapolis (PD). See No. 29: Indianapolis → Atlanta.) |
| 4 | 126 | Kansas City Chiefs | Jared Allen^{‡}^{†} | DE | Idaho State | |
| 4 | 127 | San Francisco 49ers | Richard Seigler | LB | Oregon State | from Carolina (Note: No. 127: Carolina → San Francisco (D). See No. 28: San Francisco → Carolina.) |
| 4 | 128 | New England Patriots | Cedric Cobbs | RB | Arkansas | |
| 4* | 129 | Philadelphia Eagles | J. R. Reed | FS | South Florida | |
| 4* | 130 | St. Louis Rams | Brandon Chillar | LB | UCLA | |
| 4* | 131 | Philadelphia Eagles | Trey Darilek | G | UTEP | |
| 4* | 132 | New York Jets | Adrian Jones | T | Kansas | |
| 5 | 133 | San Diego Chargers | Dave Ball | DE | UCLA | |
| 5 | 134 | Oakland Raiders | Johnnie Morant | WR | Syracuse | |
| 5 | 135 | Arizona Cardinals | Antonio Smith ^{†} | DE | Oklahoma State | |
| 5 | 136 | New York Giants | Gibril Wilson | S | Tennessee | |
| 5 | 137 | Jacksonville Jaguars | Josh Scobee | K | Louisiana Tech | |
| 5 | 138 | Tennessee Titans | Jacob Bell | G | Miami (OH) | from Houston (Note: No. 138: Houston → Tennessee (D). See No. 27: Tennessee → Houston.) |
| 5 | 139 | New Orleans Saints | Rodney Leisle | DT | UCLA | from Washington (Note: No. 139: Washington → New Orleans (D). See No. 81: New Orleans → Washington.) |
| 5 | 140 | Detroit Lions | Alex Lewis | LB | Wisconsin | |
| 5 | 141 | Indianapolis Colts | Jake Scott | G | Idaho | from Cleveland (Note: No. 141: Cleveland → Indianapolis (D). See No. 59: Indianapolis → Cleveland.) |
| 5 | 142 | Atlanta Falcons | Chad Lavalais | DT | LSU | |
| 5 | 143 | New York Jets | Erik Coleman | S | Washington State | |
| 5 | 144 | Dallas Cowboys | Sean Ryan | TE | Boston College | from Buffalo (Note: No. 144: Buffalo → Dallas (D). See No. 22: Dallas → Buffalo.) |
| 5 | 145 | Pittsburgh Steelers | Nathaniel Adibi | LB | Virginia Tech | |
| 5 | 146 | Tampa Bay Buccaneers | Jeb Terry | G | North Carolina | |
| 5 | 147 | Chicago Bears | Claude Harriott | DE | Pittsburgh | from San Francisco (Note: No. 147: San Francisco → Chicago (D). See No. 104: Chicago → San Francisco.) |
| 5 | 148 | Chicago Bears | Craig Krenzel | QB | Ohio State | |
| 5 | 149 | Cincinnati Bengals | Maurice Mann | WR | Nevada | |
| 5 | 150 | Jacksonville Jaguars | Chris Thompson | CB | Nicholls State | from New Orleans (Note: No. 150: New Orleans → Jacksonville (PD). New Orleans traded a fifth-round selection (150th overall) to Jacksonville in exchange for CB Jason Craft.) |
| 5 | 151 | Washington Redskins | Mark Wilson | T | California | from Minnesota via New Orleans (Note: No. 151: multiple trades: No. 151: Minnesota → New Orleans (D). See No. 48: New Orleans → Minnesota. No. 151: New Orleans → Washington (D). See No.81: New Orleans → Washington.) |
| 5 | 152 | Denver Broncos | Jeff Shoate | CB | San Diego State | |
| 5 | 153 | Baltimore Ravens | Roderick Green | DE | Central Missouri State | from Green Bay via Miami (Note: No. 153: multiple trades: No. 153: Green Bay → Miami (D). See No. 87: Miami → Green Bay. No. 153: Miami → Baltimore (D). Miami traded a fifth-round selection (153rd overall) to Baltimore in exchange for fifth- and seventh-round selections (160th and 222nd overall).) |
| 5 | 154 | San Diego Chargers | Michael Turner ^{†} | RB | Northern Illinois | from Miami (Note: No. 154: Miami → San Diego (PD). Miami traded a fifth-round selection (154th overall) to San Diego in exchange for LB Junior Seau.) |
| 5 | 155 | Minnesota Vikings | Rod Davis | LB | Southern Miss | from Baltimore (Note: No. 155: Baltimore → Minnesota (D). See No. 82: Minnesota → Baltimore.) |
| 5 | 156 | New Orleans Saints | Mike Karney ^{†} | FB | Arizona State | from Dallas (Note: No. 156: Dallas → New Orleans (D). Dallas traded a fifth-round selection (156th overall) to New Orleans in exchange for sixth- and seventh-round selections (182nd and 206th overall).) |
| 5 | 157 | Seattle Seahawks | D. J. Hackett | WR | Colorado | |
| 5 | 158 | St. Louis Rams | Jason Shivers | S | Arizona State | |
| 5 | 159 | Jacksonville Jaguars | Sean Bubin | T | Illinois | from Tennessee via Houston (Note: No. 159: multiple trades: No. 159: Tennessee → Houston (D). See No. 27: Tennessee → Houston. No. 159: Houston → Jacksonville (D). Houston traded a fifth-round selection (159th overall) to Jacksonville in exchange for sixth- and seventh-round selections (175th and 210th overall).) |
| 5 | 160 | Miami Dolphins | Tony Bua | S | Arkansas | from Philadelphia via Baltimore (Note: No. 160: multiple trades: No. 160: Philadelphia → Baltimore (PD). Philadelphia traded a fifth-round selection (160th overall) to Baltimore in exchange for the Ravens giving up any potential rights they may have had to WR Terrell Owens. No. 160: Baltimore → Miami (D). See No. 153: Miami → Baltimore.) |
| 5 | 161 | Cleveland Browns | Amon Gordon | DT | Stanford | from Indianapolis (Note: No. 161: Indianapolis → Cleveland (D). See No. 59: Indianapolis → Cleveland.) |
| 5 | 162 | Philadelphia Eagles | Thomas Tapeh | FB | Minnesota | from Kansas City (Note: No. 162: Kansas City → Philadelphia (PD). Kansas City traded a fifth-round selection (162nd) and a 2005 third-round selection to Philadelphia in exchange for OT John Welbourn.) |
| 5 | 163 | Carolina Panthers | Drew Carter | WR | Ohio State | |
| 5 | 164 | New England Patriots | P. K. Sam | WR | Florida State | |
| 5* | 165 | Tennessee Titans | Rob Reynolds | LB | Ohio State | |
| 6 | 166 | Oakland Raiders | Shawn Johnson | DE | Delaware | |
| 6 | 167 | Arizona Cardinals | Nick Leckey | C | Kansas State | |
| 6 | 168 | New York Giants | Jamaar Taylor | WR | Texas A&M | |
| 6 | 169 | San Diego Chargers | Ryan Krause | TE | Nebraska–Omaha | |
| 6 | 170 | Houston Texans | Vontez Duff | CB | Notre Dame | |
| 6 | 171 | Denver Broncos | Triandos Luke | WR | Alabama | from Washington (Note: No. 171: Washington → Denver (PD). Washington traded a sixth-round selection (171st overall) to Denver in exchange for DT Lional Dalton.) |
| 6 | 172 | Detroit Lions | Kelly Butler | T | Purdue | |
| 6 | 173 | Indianapolis Colts | Von Hutchins | CB | Ole Miss | from Cleveland (Note: No. 173: Cleveland → Indianapolis (D). See No. 59: Indianapolis → Cleveland.) |
| 6 | 174 | Miami Dolphins | Rex Hadnot | G | Houston | from Atlanta (Note: No. 174: Atlanta → Miami (D). Atlanta traded a sixth-round selection (174th overall) to Miami in exchange for sixth- and seventh-round selections (186th and 219th overall).) |
| 6 | 175 | Houston Texans | Jammal Lord | RB | Nebraska | from Jacksonville (Note: No. 175: Jacksonville → Houston (D). See No. 159: Houston → Jacksonville.) |
| 6 | 176 | Cleveland Browns | Kirk Chambers | T | Stanford | from Buffalo (Note: No. 176: Buffalo → Cleveland (PD). Buffalo traded a sixth-round selection (176th overall) to Cleveland in exchange for TE Mark Campbell.) |
| 6 | 177 | Pittsburgh Steelers | Bo Lacy | T | Arkansas | |
| 6 | 178 | New York Jets | Marko Cavka | T | Sacramento State | |
| 6 | 179 | Green Bay Packers | Corey Williams | DT | Arkansas State | from San Francisco (Note: No. 179: San Francisco → Green Bay (D). San Francisco traded a sixth-round selection (179th overall) to Green Bay in exchange for sixth- and seventh-round selections (188th and 226th overall).) |
| 6 | 180 | Washington Redskins | Jim Molinaro | T | Notre Dame | from Chicago (Note: No. 180: Chicago → Washington (PD). Chicago traded a sixth-round selection (176th overall) to Washington in exchange for FB Bryan Johnson.) |
| 6 | 181 | Tampa Bay Buccaneers | Nate Lawrie | TE | Yale | |
| 6 | 182 | Oakland Raiders | Cody Spencer | LB | North Texas | from New Orleans via Dallas (Note: No. 182: multiple trades: No. 182: New Orleans → Dallas (D). See No. 156: Dallas → New Orleans. No. 182: Dallas → Oakland (D). Dallas traded a sixth-round selection (182nd overall) to Oakland in exchange for two seventh-round selections (205th and 223rd overall).) |
| 6 | 183 | Cincinnati Bengals | Greg Brooks | CB | Southern Miss | |
| 6 | 184 | Minnesota Vikings | Deandre' Eiland | S | South Carolina | |
| 6 | 185 | Philadelphia Eagles | Andy Hall | QB | Delaware | from Green Bay (Note: No. 185: Green Bay → Philadelphia (PD). Green Bay traded a sixth-round selection (185th overall) to Philadelphia in exchange for a 2003 seventh-round selection.) |
| 6 | 186 | Atlanta Falcons | Etric Pruitt | S | Southern Miss | from Miami (Note: No. 186: Miami → Atlanta (D). See No. 174: Atlanta → Miami.) |
| 6 | 187 | Baltimore Ravens | Josh Harris | QB | Bowling Green | |
| 6 | 188 | San Francisco 49ers | Andy Lee ^{†} | P | Pittsburgh | from Dallas via Green Bay (Note: No. 188: multiple trades: No. 188: Dallas → Green Bay (D). Dallas traded a sixth-round selection (188th overall) to Green Bay in exchange for WR Terry Glenn. No. 188: Green Bay → San Francisco (D). See No. 179: San Francisco → Green Bay.) |
| 6 | 189 | Seattle Seahawks | Craig Terrill | DT | Purdue | |
| 6 | 190 | Denver Broncos | Josh Sewell | C | Nebraska | |
| 6 | 191 | Tennessee Titans | Troy Fleming | FB | Tennessee | |
| 6 | 192 | Philadelphia Eagles | Dexter Wynn | CB | Colorado State | |
| 6 | 193 | Indianapolis Colts | Jim Sorgi | QB | Wisconsin | |
| 6 | 194 | Pittsburgh Steelers | Matt Kranchick | TE | Penn State | from St. Louis (Note: No. 194: St. Louis → Pittsburgh (PD). St. Louis traded a sixth-round selection (194th overall) to Pittsburgh in exchange for WR Troy Edwards.) |
| 6 | 195 | Kansas City Chiefs | Jeris McIntyre | WR | Auburn | |
| 6 | 196 | Carolina Panthers | Sean Tufts | LB | Colorado | |
| 6 | 197 | Pittsburgh Steelers | Drew Caylor | C | Stanford | from New England (Note: No. 197: New England → Pittsburgh (PD). Pittsburgh were awarded New England's sixth-round selection (197th) as compensation for New England signing Pittsburgh's restricted free agent DE Rodney Bailey.) |
| 6* | 198 | San Francisco 49ers | Keith Lewis | S | Oregon | |
| 6* | 199 | Baltimore Ravens | Clarence Moore | WR | Northern Arizona | |
| 6* | 200 | Houston Texans | Charlie Anderson | LB | Ole Miss | |
| 6* | 201 | St. Louis Rams | Jeff Smoker | QB | Michigan State | |
| 7 | 202 | Arizona Cardinals | John Navarre | QB | Michigan | |
| 7 | 203 | New York Giants | Drew Strojny | T | Duke | |
| 7 | 204 | San Diego Chargers | Ryon Bingham | DT | Nebraska | |
| 7 | 205 | Dallas Cowboys | Nate Jones | CB | Rutgers | from Oakland (Note: No. 205: Oakland → Dallas (D). See No. 182: Dallas → Oakland.) |
| 7 | 206 | Tampa Bay Buccaneers | Mark Jones | WR | Tennessee | from Washington via New Orleans and Dallas (Note: No. 206: multiple trades: No. 206: Washington → New Orleans (PD). Washington traded a seventh-round selection (206th overall) to New Orleans in exchange for DT Martin Chase. No. 206: New Orleans → Dallas (D). See No. 156: Dallas → New Orleans. No. 206: Dallas → Tampa Bay (D). Dallas traded a seventh-round selection (206th overall) to Tampa Bay in exchange for a seventh-round selection (216th overall) and FB Darian Barnes.) |
| 7 | 207 | Buffalo Bills | Dylan McFarland | T | Montana | from Detroit (Note: No. 207: Detroit → Buffalo (PD). Detroit traded a seventh-round selection (207th overall) to Buffalo in exchange for RB Olandis Gary.) |
| 7 | 208 | Cleveland Browns | Adimchinobe Echemandu | RB | California | |
| 7 | 209 | San Diego Chargers | Shane Olivea | T | Ohio State | from Atlanta (Note: No. 209: Atlanta → San Diego (PD). Atlanta traded a seventh-round selection (209th overall) to San Diego in exchange for WR Trevor Gaylor.) |
| 7 | 210 | Houston Texans | Raheem Orr | LB | Rutgers | from Jacksonville (Note: No. 210: Jacksonville → Houston (D). See No. 159: Houston → Jacksonville.) |
| 7 | 211 | Houston Texans | Sloan Thomas | WR | Texas | |
| 7 | 212 | Pittsburgh Steelers | Eric Taylor | DE | Memphis | |
| 7 | 213 | New York Jets | Darrell McClover | LB | Miami (FL) | |
| 7 | 214 | Buffalo Bills | Jonathan Smith | WR | Georgia Tech | |
| 7 | 215 | Chicago Bears | Alfonso Marshall | CB | Miami (FL) | |
| 7 | 216 | Dallas Cowboys | Patrick Crayton | WR | Northwestern Oklahoma State | from Tampa Bay (Note: No. 216: Tampa Bay → Dallas (D). See No. 206: Dallas → Tampa Bay.) |
| 7 | 217 | San Francisco 49ers | Cody Pickett | QB | Washington | |
| 7 | 218 | Cincinnati Bengals | Casey Bramlet | QB | Wyoming | |
| 7 | 219 | Atlanta Falcons | Quincy Wilson | RB | West Virginia | from New Orleans via Miami (Note: No. 219: multiple trades: No. 219: New Orleans → Miami (PD). New Orleans traded a seventh-round selection (206th overall) to Miami in exchange for LB Derrick Rodgers. No. 219: Miami → Atlanta (D). See No. 174: Atlanta → Miami.) |
| 7 | 220 | Minnesota Vikings | Jeff Dugan | TE | Maryland | |
| 7 | 221 | Miami Dolphins | Tony Pape | T | Michigan | |
| 7 | 222 | Miami Dolphins | Derrick Pope | LB | Alabama | from Baltimore (Note: No. 222: Baltimore → Miami (D). See No. 153: Miami → Baltimore.) |
| 7 | 223 | Dallas Cowboys | Jacques Reeves | CB | Purdue | from Dallas via Oakland (Note: No. 223: multiple trades: No. 223: Dallas → Oakland (PD). Dallas traded a seventh-round selection (223rd overall) to Dallas in exchange for DE Kenyon Coleman. No. 223: Oakland → Dallas (D). See No. 182: Dallas → Oakland.) |
| 7 | 224 | Seattle Seahawks | Donnie Jones | P | LSU | |
| 7 | 225 | Denver Broncos | Matt Mauck | QB | LSU | |
| 7 | 226 | San Francisco 49ers | Christian Ferrara | DT | Syracuse | from Green Bay Packers (Note: No. 226: Green Bay → San Francisco (D). See No. 179: San Francisco → Green Bay.) |
| 7 | 227 | Philadelphia Eagles | Adrien Clarke | G | Ohio State | |
| 7 | 228 | Tampa Bay Buccaneers | Casey Cramer | FB | Dartmouth | from Indianapolis (Note: No. 228: Indianapolis → Tampa Bay (PD). Indianapolis traded a seventh-round selection (228th overall) to Tampa Bay in exchange for S David Gibson.) |
| 7 | 229 | Indianapolis Colts | David Kimball | K | Penn State | from St. Louis (Note: No. 229: St. Louis → Indianapolis (PD). St. Louis traded a seventh-round selection (229th overall) to Indianapolis in exchange for S Rich Coady.) |
| 7 | 230 | Tennessee Titans | Jared Clauss | DT | Iowa | |
| 7 | 231 | Kansas City Chiefs | Kevin Sampson | T | Syracuse | |
| 7 | 232 | Carolina Panthers | Michael Gaines | TE | UCF | |
| 7 | 233 | New England Patriots | Christian Morton | CB | Illinois | |
| 7* | 234 | New York Jets | Trevor Johnson | DE | Nebraska | |
| 7* | 235 | New York Jets | Derrick Ward | RB | Ottawa | |
| 7* | 236 | New York Jets | Rashad Washington | SS | Kansas State | |
| 7* | 237 | St. Louis Rams | Erik Jensen | TE | Iowa | |
| 7* | 238 | St. Louis Rams | Larry Turner | G | Eastern Kentucky | |
| 7* | 239 | Tennessee Titans | Eugene Amano | C | Southeast Missouri State | |
| 7* | 240 | New Orleans Saints | Colby Bockwoldt | LB | BYU | |
| 7* | 241 | Tennessee Titans | Sean McHugh | TE | Penn State | |
| 7* | 242 | Philadelphia Eagles | Bruce Perry | RB | Maryland | |
| 7* | 243 | Philadelphia Eagles | Dominic Furio | C | UNLV | |
| 7* | 244 | Baltimore Ravens | Derek Abney | WR | Kentucky | |
| 7* | 245 | Oakland Raiders | Courtney Anderson | TE | San Jose State | |
| 7* | 246 | Baltimore Ravens | Brian Rimpf | G | East Carolina | |
| 7* | 247 | Denver Broncos | Brandon Miree | FB | Pittsburgh | |
| 7* | 248 | Houston Texans | B. J. Symons | QB | Texas Tech | |
| 7* | 249 | Jacksonville Jaguars | Bobby McCray | DE | Florida | |
| 7* | 250 | Denver Broncos | Bradlee Van Pelt | QB | Colorado State | |
| 7* | 251 | Green Bay Packers | Scott Wells ^{†} | G | Tennessee | |
| 7* | 252 | Tampa Bay Buccaneers | Lenny Williams | CB | Southern | |
| 7^ | 253 | New York Giants | Isaac Hilton | DE | Hampton | |
| 7^ | 254 | San Diego Chargers | Carlos Joseph | T | Miami (FL) | |
| 7^ | 255 | Oakland Raiders | Andre Sommersell | LB | Colorado State | |

== Notable undrafted players ==
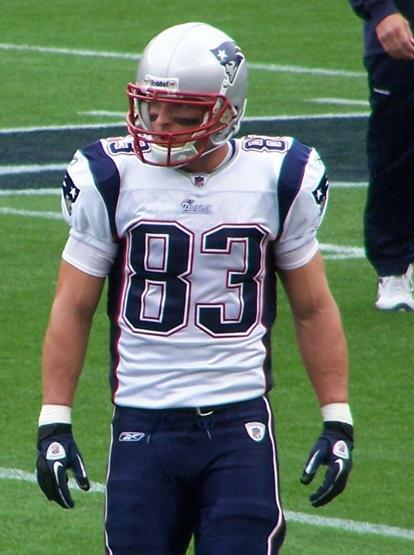
Wide receiver Wes Welker was not drafted but was named to five Pro Bowls.

| ^{†} | = Pro Bowler |

| Original NFL team | Player | Pos. | College | Notes |
|---|---|---|---|---|
| Arizona Cardinals | Rolando Cantú | G | ITESM | First NFL player trained in the Mexican university gridiron system (ONEFA) |
| Baltimore Ravens | Kory Chapman | RB | Jacksonville State | |
| Baltimore Ravens | Lance Frazier | CB | West Virginia | |
| Baltimore Ravens | Don Muhlbach ^{†} | LS | Texas A&M | |
| Baltimore Ravens | B. J. Sams | WR | McNeese State | |
| Buffalo Bills | Jabari Greer | CB | Tennessee | |
| Buffalo Bills | Jason Peters ^{†} | T | Arkansas | |
| Buffalo Bills | Shaud Williams | RB | Alabama | |
| Carolina Panthers | Jordan Carstens | DT | Iowa State | |
| Chicago Bears | Jeremy Cain | LB | UMass | |
| Chicago Bears | A. J. Ricker | C | Missouri | |
| Cincinnati Bengals | Jamall Broussard | WR | San Jose State | |
| Cincinnati Bengals | Kyle Larson | P | Nebraska | |
| Cleveland Browns | Anthony Oakley | G | Western Kentucky | |
| Dallas Cowboys | Steve Cargile | S | Columbia | |
| Dallas Cowboys | Terrance Copper | WR | East Carolina | |
| Dallas Cowboys | Ryan Fowler | LB | Duke | |
| Dallas Cowboys | Keylon Kincade | RB | SMU | |
| Dallas Cowboys | Lousaka Polite | FB | Pittsburgh | |
| Denver Broncos | Roc Alexander | S | Washington | |
| Denver Broncos | Tyson Clabo ^{†} | T | Wake Forest | |
| Detroit Lions | Dave Pearson | C | Michigan | |
| Detroit Lions | George Wilson | S | Arkansas | |
| Green Bay Packers | Vonta Leach ^{†} | FB | East Carolina | |
| Houston Texans | Kendrick Starling | RB | San Jose State | |
| Indianapolis Colts | Ben Utecht | TE | Minnesota | |
| Jacksonville Jaguars | Brian Jones | TE | Arkansas–Pine Bluff | |
| Jacksonville Jaguars | David Richardson | CB | Cal Poly | |
| Kansas City Chiefs | Ronnie Cruz | FB | Northern State | |
| Kansas City Chiefs | Ryan Lilja | G | Kansas State | |
| Kansas City Chiefs | Benny Sapp | CB | Northern Iowa | |
| Minnesota Vikings | Anthony Herrera | G | Tennessee | |
| Minnesota Vikings | Spencer Johnson | DT | Auburn | |
| Minnesota Vikings | Brock Lesnar | DT | Minnesota | |
| Minnesota Vikings | Cullen Loeffler | LS | Texas | |
| New England Patriots | Eric Alexander | LB | LSU | |
| New England Patriots | Randall Gay | CB | LSU | |
| New York Giants | Curtis Deloatch | CB | North Carolina A&T | |
| New York Giants | Jared Lorenzen | QB | Kentucky | |
| New York Giants | Jim Maxwell | LB | Gardner–Webb | |
| New York Jets | J. P. Foschi | TE | Georgia Tech | |
| Oakland Raiders | Tommy Kelly | DT | Mississippi State | |
| Philadelphia Eagles | Justin Jenkins | WR | Mississippi State | |
| Pittsburgh Steelers | Glenn Martinez | WR | Saginaw Valley State | |
| Pittsburgh Steelers | Willie Parker ^{†} | RB | North Carolina | |
| San Diego Chargers | Robb Butler | CB | Robert Morris | |
| San Diego Chargers | Malcom Floyd | WR | Wyoming | |
| San Diego Chargers | Ruvell Martin | WR | Saginaw Valley State | |
| San Diego Chargers | Wes Welker ^{†} | WR | Texas Tech | |
| San Francisco 49ers | Mike Adams ^{†} | S | Delaware | |
| San Francisco 49ers | Norm Katnik | C | USC | |
| San Francisco 49ers | Jason Wright | RB | Northwestern | |
| Seattle Seahawks | Jordan Babineaux | S | Southern Arkansas | |
| Seattle Seahawks | Michael Harden | CB | Missouri | |
| St. Louis Rams | Kelvin Kight | WR | Florida | |
| St. Louis Rams | Jamal Jones | WR | North Carolina A&T | |
| Tampa Bay Buccaneers | Jon Bradley | DT | Arkansas State | |
| Tennessee Titans | Brandon Lynch | CB | Middle Tennessee | |
| Washington Redskins | John Standeford | WR | Purdue | |

== Hall of Famers ==
- Jared Allen, defensive end from Idaho State, taken 4th round, 126th overall by the Kansas City Chiefs.

Inducted: Professional Football Hall of Fame Class of 2025.

- Larry Fitzgerald, wide receiver from Pittsburgh, taken 1st round, 3rd overall by the Arizona Cardinals.

Inducted: Professional Football Hall of Fame Class of 2026.

== Trades ==
In the explanations below, (D) denotes trades that took place during the 2004 Draft, while (PD) indicates trades completed pre-draft.

Round 1

Round 2

Round 3

Round 4

Round 5

Round 6

Round 7

== Sources ==
- "NFL Draft History: 2004 Full Draft". NFL.com. Archived from the original on October 30, 2008.
- "2004 NFL Draft". ESPN website. Archived from the original on October 1, 2004.
- "Pro Football Draft History: 2004". Pro Football Hall of Fame. Archived from the original on April 8, 2009.
- "2004 NFL Draft". pro-football-reference.com. Archived from the original on April 30, 2009.
- "2004 NFL Player Draft". databasefootball.com. Archived from the original on August 5, 2009.
