= 2004 Miami Dolphins season =

39th season in franchise history

- Owner: Wayne Huizenga
- Head coach: Dave Wannstedt (resigned November 9; 1–8 record); Jim Bates (3–4 record, interim)
- Home stadium: Pro Player Stadium

Results
- Record: 4–12
- Division place: 4th AFC East
- Playoffs: Did not qualify
- Pro Bowlers: DE Jason Taylor; CB Patrick Surtain

The 2004 Miami Dolphins season was the team's 39th overall, 35th as a member of the National Football League (NFL), and the fifth and final under head coach Dave Wannstedt, who resigned after 9 games. Defensive coordinator Jim Bates served as interim head coach for the final 7 games. The Dolphins were unable to improve upon their previous season's output of 10–6, instead only going 4–12 after starting the season 0–6. The team was adversely affected by the premature retirement of their star running back, Ricky Williams, and the trade of holdout defensive end Adewale Ogunleye for wide receiver Marty Booker, as well as career ending injuries to fullback Rob Konrad and defensive tackle Tim Bowens. With this season record below .500 the team would have their first losing season since 1988. Two of their games were postponed due to Hurricane Ivan and Hurricane Jeanne.

The Dolphins, at 2 –11 were able to upset the defending and eventual Super Bowl champion 12–1 New England Patriots, a game of the Dolphins-Patriots rivalry known as "The Night That Courage Wore Orange", and handed the Patriots their second loss of the season. During Week 6, their match with the Buffalo Bills is the only time in the NFL since 1968 that the last two winless teams have met each other.

== Offseason ==
=== NFL draft ===
2004 Miami Dolphins draft
Round	Pick	Player	Position	College	Notes
1	19	Vernon Carey	Offensive tackle	Miami (FL)	
4	102	Will Poole	Cornerback	USC	
5	160	Tony Bua	Safety	Arkansas	
6	174	Rex Hadnot	Guard	Houston	
7	221	Tony Pape	Offensive Tackle	Michigan	
7	222	Derrick Pope	Linebacker	Alabama	
Made roster † Pro Football Hall of Fame * Made at least one Pro Bowl during career

== Staff ==
2004 Miami Dolphins staff
Front office: Owner/chairman of the board – Wayne Huizenga; President – Eddie Jones; Executive vice president/chief operating officer – Bryan Wiedmeier; General manager – Rick Spielman; Head coaches: Head coach – Dave Wannstedt (Games 1-9); Assistant head coach/quarterbacks – Marc Trestman; Offensive coaches: Offensive coordinator – Chris Foerster; Running backs – Joel Collier; Wide receivers – Jerry Sullivan; Tight ends – Bernie Parmalee; Offensive line – Tony Wise; Offensive quality control/receivers – Judd Garrett; Fellowship coach-offense/special teams – Jeff Dellenbach	Defensive coaches: Defensive coordinator – Jim Bates (Interim Head Coach Games 10-16); Defensive line – Clarence Brooks; Assistant defensive line – Glenn Pires; Linebackers – Bob Sanders (Defensive Coordinator Games 10-16); Secondary – Mel Phillips; Defensive nickel package – Bill Lewis; Special teams coaches: Special teams – Keith Armstrong; Strength and conditioning: Strength and conditioning – John Gamble; Assistant strength and conditioning – Eric Fears

== Roster ==
2004 Miami Dolphins roster
Quarterbacks (QB): 7 A. J. Feeley; 17 Jason Garrett; 18 Sage Rosenfels; Running backs (RB): 43 Brock Forsey; 33 Vick King; 42 James Lynch FB; 32 Jamar Martin FB; 28 Travis Minor; 31 Sammy Morris; Wide receivers (WR): 15 Ronald Bellamy; 86 Marty Booker; 84 Chris Chambers; 82 Bryan Gilmore; 16 Maurice Mann; 88 Derrius Thompson; 83 Wes Welker; Tight ends (TE): 85 Donald Lee; 81 Randy McMichael	Offensive linemen (OL): 72 Vernon Carey OT; 66 Rex Hadnot G; 78 Jeno James G; 60 Greg Jerman G; 77 Damion McIntosh OT; 68 Seth McKinney C; 74 Wade Smith OT; 70 John St. Clair OT; 69 Taylor Whitley G; Defensive linemen (DL): 96 David Bowens DE; 93 Mario Monds DT; 98 Bryan Robinson DT; 94 Dario Romero DT; 75 Josh Shaw DT; 99 Jason Taylor DE; 91 Jay Williams DE; 90 Jeff Zgonina DT	Linebackers (LB): 50 Brendon Ayanbadejo OLB; 52 Morlon Greenwood OLB; 57 Corey Jenkins OLB; 56 Derrick Pope MLB; 59 Billy Strother MLB; 54 Zach Thomas MLB; Defensive backs (DB): 21 Deandre' Eiland SS; 20 Arturo Freeman FS; 25 Reggie Howard CB; 24 Sammy Knight SS; 29 Sam Madison CB; 27 Will Poole CB; 23 Patrick Surtain CB; 38 Quintin Williams FS; 35 Jimmy Wyrick CB; Special teams (ST): 10 Olindo Mare K; 89 Ed Perry LS; 1 Matt Turk P	Practice squad: 79 Ronald Flemons DE; 26 Leonard Henry RB; 71 Tony Pape OT; 49 Ricky Sharpe S; 61 Jamil Soriano G; 87 J. R. Tolver WR; Reserve: 36 Chris Akins S (IR); 37 Yeremiah Bell S (IR); 80 David Boston WR (IR); 95 Tim Bowens DT (IR); 51 Tony Bua OLB (IR); 64 Larry Chester DT (IR); 9 Jay Fiedler QB (IR); 30 Lamar Gordon RB (IR); 44 Rob Konrad FB (IR); 58 Eddie Moore OLB (IR); 14 Kendall Newson WR (IR); 45 Alphonso Roundtree CB (IR); 55 Junior Seau OLB (IR); 53 Renauld Williams OLB (IR); 62 Eric Wilson DT (IR); 22 Shawn Wooden S (PUP); Rookies in italics 53 active, 16 reserve, 6 practice squad

== Schedule ==
Week	Date	Opponent	Result	Record	Venue	Attendance
1	September 11	Tennessee Titans	**L** 7–17	0–1	Pro Player Stadium	69,987
2	September 19	at Cincinnati Bengals	**L** 13–16	0–2	Paul Brown Stadium	65,705
3	September 26	Pittsburgh Steelers	**L** 3–13	0–3	Pro Player Stadium	72,225
4	October 3	**New York Jets**	**L** 9–17	0–4	Pro Player Stadium	73,157
5	October 10	at **New England Patriots**	**L** 10–24	0–5	Gillette Stadium	68,756
6	October 17	at **Buffalo Bills**	**L** 13–20	0–6	Ralph Wilson Stadium	72,214
7	October 24	St. Louis Rams	**W** 31–14	1–6	Pro Player Stadium	72,945
8	November 1	at **New York Jets**	**L** 14–41	1–7	Giants Stadium	78,216
9	November 7	Arizona Cardinals	**L** 23–24	1–8	Pro Player Stadium	72,612
10	Bye					
11	November 21	at Seattle Seahawks	**L** 17–24	1–9	Qwest Field	66,644
12	November 28	at San Francisco 49ers	**W** 24–17	2–9	Monster Park	66,156
13	December 5	**Buffalo Bills**	**L** 32–42	2–10	Pro Player Stadium	73,084
14	December 12	at Denver Broncos	**L** 17–20	2–11	Invesco Field at Mile High	75,027
15	December 20	**New England Patriots**	**W** 29–28	3–11	Pro Player Stadium	73,629
16	December 26	Cleveland Browns	**W** 10–7	4–11	Pro Player Stadium	73,169
17	January 2	at Baltimore Ravens	**L** 23–30	4–12	M&T Bank Stadium	69,843
Note: Intra-division opponents are in **bold** text

=== Season summary ===
==== Week 2 ====
Team	1	2	3	4	Total
Dolphins	0	3	0	10	13
• Bengals	0	0	13	3	16

- Date: September 19
- Location: Paul Brown Stadium
- Game start: 8:30 p.m. EST
- Game attendance: 65,705
- Game weather: 72 °F or 22.2 °C, relative humidity 41%, wind 9 miles per hour (14 km/h; 7.8 kn)
- Referee: Walt Anderson
- TV announcers (ESPN): Pat Summerall, Paul Maguire, Joe Theismann, and Suzy Kolber

Scoring summary
Q2	12:39	MIA	Mare 43 yard field goal	MIA 3–0
Q3	12:01	CIN	Simmons 50 yard interception return (Graham kick)	CIN 7–3
Q3	5:11	CIN	Graham 48 yard field goal	CIN 10–3
Q3	0:13	CIN	Graham 36 yard field goal	CIN 13–3
Q4	3:39	MIA	Chambers 4 yard pass from Feeley (Mare kick)	CIN 13–10
Q4	1:53	MIA	Mare 47 yard field goal	Tie 13–13
Q4	0:02	CIN	Graham 39 yard field goal	CIN 16–13

The loss ended the Dolphins' nine-game winning streak against the Bengals, losing to them for the first time since the 1977 season.

=== "The Night That Courage Wore Orange" ===
On December 20, 2004, the 2–11 Dolphins faced the 12–1 defending and eventual Super Bowl champion Patriots on Monday Night Football in an upset win by a score of 29–28. Late in the fourth quarter, A. J. Feeley threw a game-winning touchdown to Derrius Thompson on 4th down and 10 shortly before Arturo Freeman caught a game-winning interception pass by Tom Brady to seal the game. Bleacher Report writer Thomas Galicia nicknamed the game "The Night That Courage Wore Orange".

=== Images ===
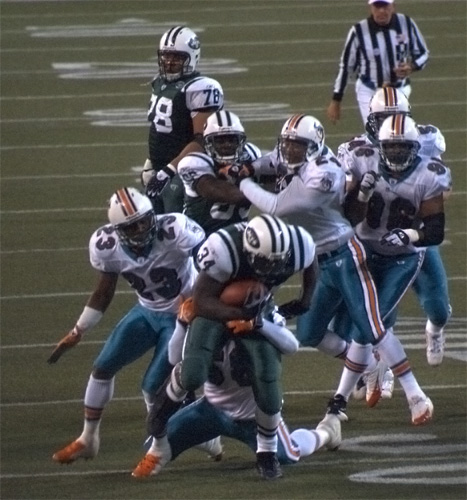
Miami at the Jets in the 2004 season, week 8

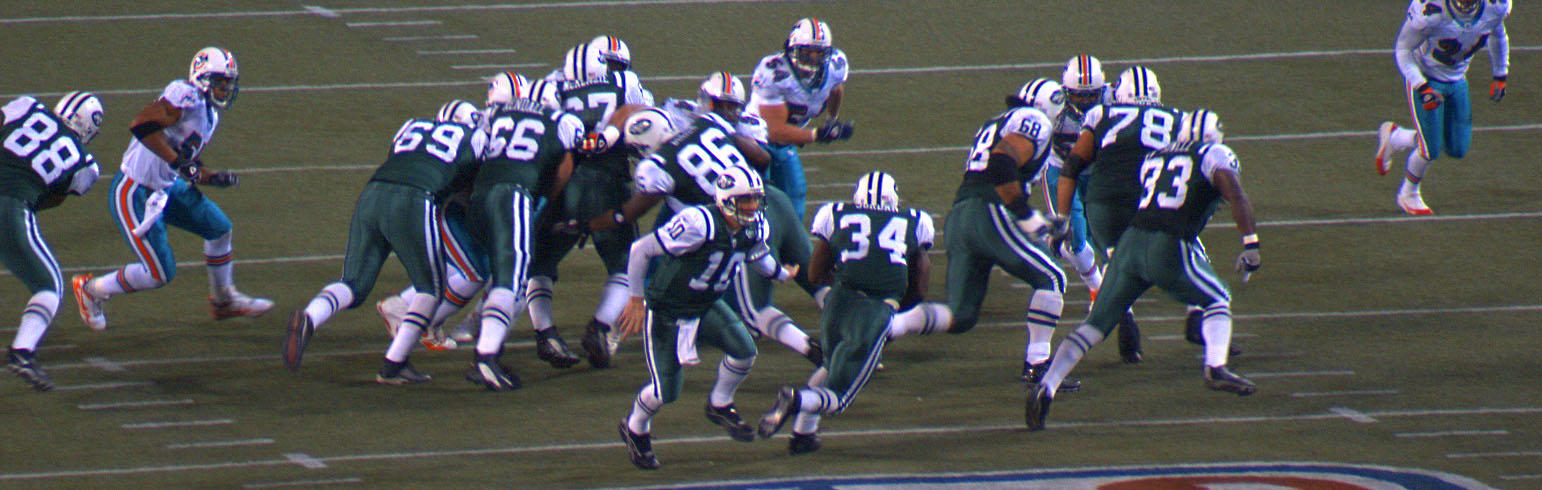
Dolphins defense is called into action, week 8

== Standings ==
AFC East
	W	L	T	PCT	DIV	CONF	PF	PA	STK
^{(2)} New England Patriots	14	2	0	.875	5–1	10–2	437	260	W2
^{(5)} New York Jets	10	6	0	.625	3–3	7–5	333	261	L2
Buffalo Bills	9	7	0	.563	3–3	5–7	395	284	L1
Miami Dolphins	4	12	0	.250	1–5	2–10	275	354	L1

AFC
#	Team	Division	W	L	T	PCT	DIV	CONF	SOS	SOV	STK
Division leaders
1	Pittsburgh Steelers	North	15	1	0	.938	5–1	11–1	.484	.479	W14
2	New England Patriots	East	14	2	0	.875	5–1	10–2	.492	.478	W2
3 (Note: Indianapolis clinched the AFC #3 seed instead of San Diego based upon head-to-head victory.)	Indianapolis Colts	South	12	4	0	.750	5–1	8–4	.500	.458	L1
4	San Diego Chargers	West	12	4	0	.750	5–1	9–3	.477	.411	W1
Wild cards
5 (Note: New York Jets clinched the AFC #5 seed instead of Denver based upon better record against common opponents (New York Jets were 5–0 to Denver’s 3–2 against San Diego, Cincinnati, Houston, and Miami).)	New York Jets	East	10	6	0	.625	3–3	7–5	.523	.406	L2
6	Denver Broncos	West	10	6	0	.625	3–3	7–5	.484	.450	W2
Did not qualify for the postseason
7 (Note: Jacksonville and Baltimore finished ahead of Buffalo because they each defeated Buffalo head-to-head.) (Note: Jacksonville finished ahead of Baltimore based upon better record against common opponents (Jacksonville were 3–2 against Baltimore’s 2–3 versus Pittsburgh, Indianapolis, Buffalo and Kansas City).)	Jacksonville Jaguars	South	9	7	0	.563	2–4	6–6	.527	.479	W1
8	Baltimore Ravens	North	9	7	0	.563	3–3	6–6	.551	.472	W1
9	Buffalo Bills	East	9	7	0	.563	3–3	5–7	.512	.382	L1
10	Cincinnati Bengals	North	8	8	0	.500	2–4	4–8	.543	.453	W2
11 (Note: Houston finished ahead of Kansas City based upon head-to-head victory.)	Houston Texans	South	7	9	0	.438	4–2	6–6	.504	.402	L1
12	Kansas City Chiefs	West	7	9	0	.438	3–3	6–6	.551	.509	L1
13 (Note: Oakland finished ahead of Tennessee based upon head-to-head victory.)	Oakland Raiders	West	5	11	0	.313	1–5	3–9	.570	.450	L2
14	Tennessee Titans	South	5	11	0	.313	1–5	3–9	.512	.463	W1
15 (Note: Miami finished ahead of Cleveland based upon head-to-head victory.)	Miami Dolphins	East	4	12	0	.250	1–5	2–10	.555	.438	L1
16	Cleveland Browns	North	4	12	0	.250	1–5	3–9	.590	.469	W1
Tiebreakers (Note: When breaking ties for three or more teams under the NFL's rules, they are first broken within divisions, then comparing only the highest-ranked remaining team from each division.)
