= 2003 Sacramento State Hornets football team =

American college football season

2003 Sacramento State Hornets football
- Conference: Big Sky Conference
- Record: 2–9 (1–6 Big Sky)
- Head coach: Steve Mooshagian (1st season)
- Home stadium: Hornet Stadium

2003 Big Sky Conference football standings
	Conf.			Overall
Team	W		L	W		L
No. 14 Montana +^	5	–	2	9	–	4
No. 10 Northern Arizona +^	5	–	2	9	–	4
No. 21 Montana State +^	5	–	2	7	–	6
No. 22 Idaho State	4	–	3	8	–	4
Weber State	4	–	3	8	–	4
Eastern Washington	3	–	4	6	–	5
Portland State	1	–	6	4	–	7
Sacramento State	1	–	6	2	–	9
+ – Conference co-champions; ^ – NCAA Division I-AA playoff participant; Rankings from The Sports Network poll

The 2003 Sacramento State Hornets football team represented California State University, Sacramento as a member of the Big Sky Conference during the 2003 NCAA Division I-AA football season. Led by first-year head coach Steve Mooshagian, Sacramento State compiled an overall record of 2–9 with a mark of 1–6 in conference play, tying for seventh place in the Big Sky. The team was outscored by its opponents 332 to 237 for the season. The Hornets played home games at Hornet Stadium in Sacramento, California.

== Schedule ==
Date	Opponent	Site	Result	Attendance	Source
August 28	at Oregon State*	Reser Stadium; Corvallis, OR	L 7–40	35,614	
September 6	Saint Mary's*	Hornet Stadium; Sacramento, CA	W 69–19	6,112	
September 13	at No. 25 Cal Poly*	Mustang Stadium; San Luis Obispo, CA	L 17–31	7,506	
September 27	No. 12 Idaho State	Hornet Stadium; Sacramento, CA	W 47–21	6,312	
October 4	UC Davis*	Hornet Stadium; Sacramento, CA (Causeway Classic)	L 27–31	15,403	
October 11	No. 14 Northern Arizona	Hornet Stadium; Sacramento, CA	L 21–24	5,107	
October 18	at Portland State	PGE Park; Portland, OR	L 7–20	4,921	
October 25	Eastern Washington	Hornet Stadium; Sacramento, CA	L 21–38	6,022	
November 1	at Montana State	Bobcat Stadium; Bozeman, MT	L 7–56	8,767	
November 8	No. 8 Montana	Hornet Stadium; Sacramento, CA	L 0–26	2,122	
November 15	at Weber State	Stewart Stadium; Ogden, UT	L 14–26	4,598	
*Non-conference game; Rankings from The Sports Network Poll released prior to the game

== Team players in the NFL ==
The following Sacramento State players were selected in the 2004 NFL draft.

Player	Position	Round	Overall	NFL team
Marko Cavka	Tackle	6	178	New York Jets
