= 2003 Eastern Washington Eagles football team =

American college football season

2003 Eastern Washington Eagles football
- Conference: Big Sky Conference
- Record: 6–5 (3–4 Big Sky)
- Head coach: Paul Wulff (4th season)
- Offensive coordinator: Beau Baldwin (1st season)
- Defensive coordinator: Jody Sears (1st season)
- Home stadium: Woodward Field; Joe Albi Stadium

2003 Big Sky Conference football standings
	Conf.			Overall
Team	W		L	W		L
No. 14 Montana +^	5	–	2	9	–	4
No. 10 Northern Arizona +^	5	–	2	9	–	4
No. 21 Montana State +^	5	–	2	7	–	6
No. 22 Idaho State	4	–	3	8	–	4
Weber State	4	–	3	8	–	4
Eastern Washington	3	–	4	6	–	5
Portland State	1	–	6	4	–	7
Sacramento State	1	–	6	2	–	9
+ – Conference co-champions; ^ – NCAA Division I-AA playoff participant; Rankings from The Sports Network poll

The 2003 Eastern Washington Eagles football team represented Eastern Washington University as a member of the Big Sky Conference during the 2003 NCAA Division I-AA football season. Led by fourth-year head coach Paul Wulff, the Eagles compiled an overall record of 6–5, with a mark of 3–4 in conference play, and finished sixth in the Big Sky. The team played home games at Woodward Field in Cheney and Joe Albi Stadium in Spokane, Washington.

== Schedule ==
Date	Opponent	Site	Result	Attendance	Source
August 30	at San Diego State*	Qualcomm Stadium; San Diego, CA	L 9–19	21,145	
September 6	at Idaho*	Kibbie Dome; Moscow, ID	W 8–5	13,556	
September 13	Central Washington*	Woodward Field; Cheney, WA	W 48–29	5,180	
September 20	Southern Utah*	Woodward Field; Cheney, WA	W 49–21	6,201	
September 27	Weber State	Woodward Field; Cheney, WA	L 23–35	5,253	
October 4	at No. 25 Idaho State	Holt Arena; Pocatello, ID	L 52–55 ^{2OT}		
October 11	Portland State	Woodward Field; Cheney, WA (rivalry)	W 42–16	6,384	
October 18	at No. 14 Northern Arizona	Walkup Skydome; Flagstaff, AZ	L 31–54	10,654	
October 25	at Sacramento State	Hornet Stadium; Sacramento, CA	W 38–21	6,022	
November 8	Montana State	Joe Albi Stadium; Spokane, WA	W 34–25	7,891	
November 15	at No. 5 Montana	Washington–Grizzly Stadium; Missoula, MT (EWU–UM Governors Cup)	L 10–41	23,329	
*Non-conference game; Rankings from The Sports Network Poll released prior to the game
