= 2003 Weber State Wildcats football team =

American college football season

2003 Weber State Wildcats football
- Conference: Big Sky Conference
- Record: 8–4 (4–3 Big Sky)
- Head coach: Jerry Graybeal (6th season)
- Home stadium: Stewart Stadium

2003 Big Sky Conference football standings
| | Conf. | | | Overall |
| Team | W | | L | W | | L |
|---|---|---|---|---|---|---|
| No. 14 Montana +^ | 5 | – | 2 | 9 | – | 4 |
| No. 10 Northern Arizona +^ | 5 | – | 2 | 9 | – | 4 |
| No. 21 Montana State +^ | 5 | – | 2 | 7 | – | 6 |
| No. 22 Idaho State | 4 | – | 3 | 8 | – | 4 |
| Weber State | 4 | – | 3 | 8 | – | 4 |
| Eastern Washington | 3 | – | 4 | 6 | – | 5 |
| Portland State | 1 | – | 6 | 4 | – | 7 |
| Sacramento State | 1 | – | 6 | 2 | – | 9 |
+ – Conference co-champions; ^ – NCAA Division I-AA playoff participant; Rankings from The Sports Network poll

The 2003 Weber State Wildcats football team represented Weber State University as a member of the Big Sky Conference during the 2003 NCAA Division I-AA football season. Led by sixth-year head coach Jerry Graybeal, the Wildcats compiled an overall record of 8–4, with a mark of 4–3 in conference play, and finished tied for fourth in the Big Sky. The team played home games at Stewart Stadium in Ogden, Utah.

== Schedule ==
| Date | Opponent | Site | Result | Attendance | Source |
|---|---|---|---|---|---|
| August 30 | Western State (CO)* | Stewart Stadium; Ogden, UT | W 38–13 | 6,503 | |
| September 6 | Southern Utah* | Stewart Stadium; Ogden, UT (Beehive Bowl) | W 13–3 | 10,311 | |
| September 13 | at Colorado State* | Hughes Stadium; Fort Collins, CO | L 7–31 | 28,611 | |
| September 20 | Montana Tech* | Stewart Stadium; Ogden, UT | W 49–14 | 6,838 | |
| September 27 | at Eastern Washington | Woodward Field; Cheney, WA | W 35–23 | 5,253 | |
| October 4 | No. 17 Northern Arizona | Stewart Stadium; Ogden, UT | L 29–48 | 5,010 | |
| October 11 | at No. 6 Montana | Washington–Grizzly Stadium; Missoula, MT | L 7–12 | 23,520 | |
| October 18 | Montana State | Stewart Stadium; Ogden, UT | L 3–26 | 7,721 | |
| October 25 | No. 17 Idaho State | Stewart Stadium; Ogden, UT | W 38–21 | | |
| November 8 | at Portland State | PGE Park; Portland, OR | W 45–21 | 4,331 | |
| November 15 | Sacramento State | Stewart Stadium; Ogden, UT | W 26–14 | 4,598 | |
| November 22 | at Saint Mary's* | Saint Mary's Stadium; Moraga, CA | W 35–15 | 1,174 | |
*Non-conference game; Rankings from The Sports Network Poll released prior to the game
