= Andre Sommersell =

Guyanese gridiron football player (born 1980)

Profile
- Position: Linebacker

Personal information
- Born: June 26, 1980 (age 46); Berbice, Guyana

Career information
- High school: Fountain Valley (Fountain Valley, California, U.S.)
- College: Colorado State
- NFL draft: 2004: 7 / Pick 255th round

Career history
- 2004: Oakland Raiders*
- 2004: Cleveland Browns*
- 2004–2005: Indianapolis Colts*
- 2005: Berlin Thunder
- 2006: Edmonton Eskimos
- * Offseason or practice squad member only

Andre Sommersell (born June 26, 1980) is a former National Football League (NFL) linebacker. He was Mr. Irrelevant in the 2004 NFL draft, and was selected 255th overall by the Oakland Raiders. Sommersell was born in Guyana but played high school football in Fountain Valley, California.

In early summer 2005, Sommersell signed with the NFL Europe team Berlin Thunder played one season in Europe.
