= 2003 Portland State Vikings football team =

American college football season

2003 Portland State Vikings football
- Conference: Big Sky Conference
- Record: 4–7 (1–6 Big Sky)
- Head coach: Tim Walsh (11th season)
- Home stadium: PGE Park

2003 Big Sky Conference football standings
	Conf.			Overall
Team	W		L	W		L
No. 14 Montana +^	5	–	2	9	–	4
No. 10 Northern Arizona +^	5	–	2	9	–	4
No. 21 Montana State +^	5	–	2	7	–	6
No. 22 Idaho State	4	–	3	8	–	4
Weber State	4	–	3	8	–	4
Eastern Washington	3	–	4	6	–	5
Portland State	1	–	6	4	–	7
Sacramento State	1	–	6	2	–	9
+ – Conference co-champions; ^ – NCAA Division I-AA playoff participant; Rankings from The Sports Network poll

The 2003 Portland State Vikings football team was an American football team that represented Portland State University during the 2003 NCAA Division I-AA football season as a member of the Big Sky Conference. In their 11th year under head coach Tim Walsh, the team compiled an 4–7 record, with a mark of 1–6 in conference play, and finished tied for seventh in the Big Sky. The Vikings played their home games at PGE Park in Portland, Oregon.

== Schedule ==
Date	Opponent	Rank	Site	Result	Attendance	Source
September 4	Texas A&M–Kingsville*		PGE Park; Portland, OR	W 34–21	10,519	
September 13	No. 20 Nicholls State*		PGE Park; Portland, OR	W 44–37	5,627	
September 20	Northern Arizona	No. 22	PGE Park; Portland, OR	L 0–23	6,832	
September 27	at Fresno State*		Bulldog Stadium; Fresno, CA	L 16–42	39,805	
October 4	at Stephen F. Austin*		Homer Bryce Stadium; Nacogdoches, TX	W 21–13	5,147	
October 11	at Eastern Washington		Woodward Field; Cheney, WA (rivalry)	L 16–42	6,384	
October 18	Sacramento State		PGE Park; Portland, OR	W 20–7	4,921	
October 25	at No. 12 Montana		Washington–Grizzly Stadium; Missoula, MT	L 14–42	23,182	
November 1	at No. 24 Idaho State		Holt Arena; Pocatello, ID	L 20–30	6,250	
November 8	Weber State		PGE Park; Portland, OR	L 21–45	4,331	
November 15	Montana State		PGE Park; Portland, OR	L 14–25		
*Non-conference game; Rankings from The Sports Network Poll released prior to the game
