= 2003 Humboldt State Lumberjacks football team =

American college football season

2003 Humboldt State Lumberjacks football
- Conference: Great Northwest Athletic Conference
- Record: 3–7 (0–3 GNAC)
- Head coach: Doug Adkins (4th season)
- Home stadium: Redwood Bowl

2003 Great Northwest Athletic Conference football standings
	Conf.			Overall
Team	W		L	W		L
Western Washington $	3	–	0	4	–	6
Central Washington	2	–	1	6	–	4
Western Oregon	1	–	2	4	–	6
Humboldt State	0	–	3	3	–	7
$ – Conference champion; First Humboldt State vs. Western Oregon game (Sept. 6) did not count as a conference game

The 2003 Humboldt State Lumberjacks football team represented Humboldt State University—now known as California State Polytechnic University, Humboldt—as a member of the Great Northwest Athletic Conference (GNAC) during the 2003 NCAA Division II football season. Led fourth-year head coach Doug Adkins, the Lumberjacks compiled an overall record of 3–7 with a mark of 0–3 in conference play, placing last out of four teams in the GNAC. The team was outscored its by opponents 268 to 198 for the season. Humboldt State played home games at the Redwood Bowl in Arcata, California.

== Schedule ==
Date	Opponent	Site	Result	Source
September 6	Western Oregon*	Redwood Bowl; Arcata, CA	L 22–23 ^{2OT}	
September 13	at Saint Mary's*	Saint Mary's Stadium; Moraga, CA	W 20–6	
September 27	Southern Oregon*	Redwood Bowl; Arcata, CA	W 31–10	
October 11	Azusa Pacific*	Redwood Bowl; Arcata, CA	W 21–7	
October 18	at Central Washington	Tomlinson Stadium; Ellensburg, WA	L 16–21	
October 25	at Southern Oregon*	Fuller Field; Ashland, OR	L 21–40	
November 1	Western Washington	Redwood Bowl; Arcata, CA	L 20–34	
November 8	at Western Oregon	McArthur Field; Monmouth, OR	L 20–24	
November 15	at South Dakota State*	Coughlin–Alumni Stadium; Brookings, SD	L 6–47	
November 22	at Cal Poly*	Mustang Stadium; San Luis Obispo, CA	L 21–56	
*Non-conference game
