= 2003 Montana Grizzlies football team =

American college football season

2003 Montana Grizzlies football

Big Sky co-champion

NCAA Division I-AA First Round, L 43–40^{2OT} vs Western Illinois
- Conference: Big Sky Conference

Ranking
- Sports Network: No. 14
- Record: 9–4 (5–2 Big Sky)
- Head coach: Bobby Hauck (1st season)
- Offensive coordinator: Rob Phenicie (1st season)
- Home stadium: Washington–Grizzly Stadium

2003 Big Sky Conference football standings
	Conf.			Overall
Team	W		L	W		L
No. 14 Montana +^	5	–	2	9	–	4
No. 10 Northern Arizona +^	5	–	2	9	–	4
No. 21 Montana State +^	5	–	2	7	–	6
No. 22 Idaho State	4	–	3	8	–	4
Weber State	4	–	3	8	–	4
Eastern Washington	3	–	4	6	–	5
Portland State	1	–	6	4	–	7
Sacramento State	1	–	6	2	–	9
+ – Conference co-champions; ^ – NCAA Division I-AA playoff participant; Rankings from The Sports Network poll

The 2003 Montana Grizzlies football team represented the University of Montana as a member of the Big Sky Conference during the 2003 NCAA Division I-AA football season. Led by first-year head coach Bobby Hauck, the Grizzlies compiled an overall record of 9–4, with a mark of 5–2 in conference play, and finished as Big Sky co-champion. Montana advanced to the NCAA Division I-AA Football Championship playoffs, where the Grizzlies lost to Western Illinois in the first round. The team played home games at Washington–Grizzly Stadium in Missoula, Montana.

== Schedule ==
Date	Time	Opponent	Rank	Site	TV	Result	Attendance	Source
August 30	4:00 pm	at No. 16 Maine*	No. 4	Alfond Stadium; Orono, ME		W 30–20	9,345	
September 6	1:05 pm	North Dakota State*	No. 3	Washington–Grizzly Stadium; Missoula, MT	MTN	L 24–25	23,102	
September 13	1:05 pm	Sam Houston State*	No. 12	Washington–Grizzly Stadium; Missoula, MT	MTN	W 38–14	23,033	
September 27	1:05 pm	Idaho*	No. 9	Washington–Grizzly Stadium; Missoula, MT (Little Brown Stein)	MTN	W 41–28	23,679	
October 4	1:05 pm	No. 20 Cal Poly*^{†}	No. 8	Washington–Grizzly Stadium; Missoula, MT	MTN	W 17–14	23,687	
October 11	1:05 pm	Weber State	No. 6	Washington–Grizzly Stadium; Missoula, MT	MTN	W 12–7	23,520	
October 18	2:05 pm	at No. 21 Idaho State	No. 5	Holt Arena; Pocatello, ID	MTN	L 40–43 ^{2OT}	11,434	
October 25	12:35 pm	Portland State	No. 12	Washington–Grizzly Stadium; Missoula, MT	MTN	W 42–14	23,182	
November 1	3:35 pm	at No. 15 Northern Arizona	No. 10	Walkup Skydome; Flagstaff, AZ	MTN	W 59–21	12,821	
November 8	7:05 pm	at Sacramento State	No. 8	Hornet Stadium; Sacramento, CA	MTN	W 26–0	2,122	
November 15	12:05 pm	Eastern Washington	No. 5	Washington-Grizzly Stadium; Missoula, MT (EWU–UM Governors Cup)	MTN	W 41–10	23,329	
November 22	12:05 pm	at Montana State	No. 4	Bobcat Stadium; Bozeman, MT (rivalry)	MTN	L 20–27	15,087	
November 29	12:05 pm	No. 10 Western Illinois*	No. 11	Washington-Grizzly Stadium; Missoula, MT (NCAA Division I-AA First Round)	MTN	L 40–43 ^{2OT}	16,222	
*Non-conference game; ^{†}Homecoming; Rankings from The Sports Network Poll released prior to the game; All times are in Mountain time

== Roster ==
2003 Montana Grizzlies football team roster
Players
Coaches
Offense

Pos.	#	Name	Class
OT	64	Dylan Brown	Jr
C	65	Garth Enger	Jr
RB	33	Justin Green	Jr
OT	72	Dylan McFarland	Sr
QB	7	Craig Ochs	Jr
OT	75	Cory Procter	Jr
OT	76	Brad Rhoades	So
OT	77	Jon Skinner	Sr
QB		Kyle Samson	Fr

Defense

Pos.	#	Name	Class
FS	4	David DeCoite	Sr
DT	99	Alan Saenz	Jr
CB	11	Vernon Smith	Sr

Special teams

Pos.	#	Name	Class

Head coach

- Bobby Hauck

Coordinators/assistant coaches

Legend

- (C) Team captain
- (S) Suspended
- (I) Ineligible
- Injured
- Redshirt

Roster

== Team players in the NFL ==
Player	Position	Round	Pick	NFL club
Dylan McFarland	Tackle	7	207	Buffalo Bills
