= 2003 Cal Poly Mustangs football team =

American college football season

2003 Cal Poly Mustangs football
- Conference: Independent
- Record: 7–4
- Head coach: Rich Ellerson (3rd season)
- Home stadium: Mustang Stadium

2003 NCAA Division I-AA independents football standings
	Conf.			Overall
Team	W		L	W		L
No. 4 Florida Atlantic ^		–		11	–	3
Cal Poly		–		7	–	4
Southeastern Louisiana		–		5	–	7
Southern Utah		–		4	–	7
Saint Mary's		–		1	–	11
FIU		–		0	–	10
Savannah State		–		0	–	12
^ – NCAA Division I-AA playoff participant; Record adjusted for 2 vacated wins by FIU; Rankings from The Sports Network poll

The 2003 Cal Poly Mustangs football team represented California Polytechnic State University, San Luis Obispo as an independent during the 2003 NCAA Division I-AA football season. Led by third-year head coach Rich Ellerson, Cal Poly compiled a record of 7–4. The team outscored its opponents 316 to 241 for the season. The Mustangs played home games at Mustang Stadium in San Luis Obispo, California.

2003 was the last season in which Cal Poly competed independent. In 2004, the Mustangs became a charter member of the Great West Football Conference.

== Schedule ==
Date	Opponent	Rank	Site	Result	Attendance	Source
September 6	at UTEP		Sun Bowl; El Paso, TX	W 34–13	26,224	
September 13	Sacramento State	No. 25	Mustang Stadium; San Luis Obispo, CA	W 31–17	7,506	
September 20	No. 11 Montana State	No. 21	Mustang Stadium; San Luis Obispo, CA	W 24–21	8,458	
September 27	at No. 25 Northern Arizona	No. 14	Walkup Skydome; Flagstaff, AZ	L 7–24	9,011	
October 4	at No. 8 Montana	No. 20	Washington–Grizzly Stadium; Missoula, MT	L 14–17	23,687	
October 11	at Akron	No. 24	Rubber Bowl; Akron, OH	L 14–45	8,319	
October 18	Saint Mary's		Mustang Stadium; San Luis Obispo, CA	W 54–10		
November 1	Southern Utah		Mustang Stadium; San Luis Obispo, CA	W 33–21		
November 8	at UC Davis		Toomey Field; Davis, CA (rivalry)	W 18–14	7,477	
November 15	Idaho State	No. 20	Mustang Stadium; San Luis Obispo, CA	L 31–38		
November 22	Humboldt State		Mustang Stadium; San Luis Obispo, CA	W 56–21		
Rankings from The Sports Network Poll released prior to the game

== Team players in the NFL ==
No Cal Poly Mustang players were selected in the 2004 NFL draft. The following finished their college career in 2003, were not drafted, but played in the NFL.

Player	Position	First NFL team
David Richardson	Defensive back	2004 Jacksonville Jaguars
