= Billy Strother =

American football player (born 1982)

No. 48, 59
- Position: Linebacker

Personal information
- Born: January 8, 1982 (age 44); Evansville, Indiana, U.S.

Career information
- College: New Mexico

Career history
- 2004: Washington Redskins*
- 2004: New Orleans Saints*
- 2004: Washington Redskins
- 2004: Miami Dolphins
- * Offseason or practice squad member only

Awards and highlights
- Second-team All-MW (2003)
- Stats at Pro Football Reference

William Gregory Strother (born January 8, 1982) is an American former professional football linebacker in the National Football League (NFL) for the Miami Dolphins and Washington Redskins. He played college football at the University of New Mexico.
