= 2003 Northern Arizona Lumberjacks football team =

American college football season

2003 Northern Arizona Lumberjacks football
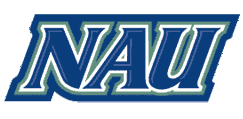

Big Sky co-champion

NCAA Division I-AA Quarterfinal, L 25–48 vs. Florida Atlantic
- Conference: Big Sky Conference

Ranking
- Sports Network: No. 10
- Record: 9–4 (5–2 Big Sky)
- Head coach: Jerome Souers (6th season)
- Home stadium: J. Lawrence Walkup Skydome

2003 Big Sky Conference football standings
	Conf.			Overall
Team	W		L	W		L
No. 14 Montana +^	5	–	2	9	–	4
No. 10 Northern Arizona +^	5	–	2	9	–	4
No. 21 Montana State +^	5	–	2	7	–	6
No. 22 Idaho State	4	–	3	8	–	4
Weber State	4	–	3	8	–	4
Eastern Washington	3	–	4	6	–	5
Portland State	1	–	6	4	–	7
Sacramento State	1	–	6	2	–	9
+ – Conference co-champions; ^ – NCAA Division I-AA playoff participant; Rankings from The Sports Network poll

The 2003 Northern Arizona Lumberjacks football team was an American football team that represented Northern Arizona University (NAU) as a member of the Big Sky Conference (Big Sky) during the 2003 NCAA Division I-AA football season. In their sixth year under head coach Jerome Souers, the Lumberjacks compiled a 9–4 record (5–2 against conference opponents), outscored opponents by a total of 409 to 305, and finished in a three-way tie for the Big Sky championship.

The Lumberjacks were invited to play in the 2003 NCAA Division I-AA playoffs and defeated No. 1 McNeese State on the road in Lake Charles, Louisiana. It was the program's first ever victory in the Division I-AA playoffs. They then advanced to the Quarterfinals, losing to No. 13 Florida Atlantic.

The team played its home games at the J. Lawrence Walkup Skydome, commonly known as the Walkup Skydome, in Flagstaff, Arizona.

The team's statistical leaders included Roger Robinson with 1,108 rushing yards and Jason Murietta with 3,472 passing yards (including 431 yards against Sacramento State), Clarence Moore with 1,184 receiving yards, and Paul Ernster with 101 points scored.

== Schedule ==
Date	Opponent	Rank	Site	Result	Attendance	Source
August 30	Saint Mary's*		Walkup Skydome; Flagstaff, AZ	W 44–3	4,152	
September 6	at No. 20 (I-A) Arizona State*		Sun Devil Stadium; Tempe, AZ	L 14–34	60,069	
September 20	at No. 22 Portland State		PGE Park; Portland, OR	W 23–0	6,832	
September 27	No. 14 Cal Poly*	No. 25	Walkup Skydome; Flagstaff, AZ	W 24–7	9,011	
October 4	at Weber State	No. 17	Stewart Stadium; Ogden, UT	W 48–29	5,010	
October 11	at Sacramento State	No. 14	Hornet Stadium; Sacramento, CA	W 24–21	5,107	
October 18	Eastern Washington	No. 14	Walkup Skydome; Flagstaff, AZ	W 54–31	10,654	
October 25	at Montana State	No. 10	Bobcat Stadium; Bozeman, MT	L 17–21	12,207	
November 1	No. 10 Montana	No. 15	Walkup Skydome; Flagstaff, AZ	L 21–59	12,821	
November 8	No. 22 Idaho State	No. 20	Walkup Skydome; Flagstaff, AZ	W 46–31	7,111	
November 15	at Sam Houston State*	No. 18	Bowers Stadium; Huntsville, TX	W 34–18	2,118	
November 29	at No. 1 McNeese State*	No. 16	Cowboy Stadium; Lake Charles, LA (NCAA Division I-AA First Round)	W 35–3	14,300	
December 6	No. 13 Florida Atlantic*	No. 16	Walkup Skydome; Flagstaff, AZ (NCAA Division I-AA Quarterfinal)	L 25–48	9,314	
*Non-conference game; Rankings from The Sports Network Poll released prior to the game
