= Rex Hadnot =

American football player (born 1982)

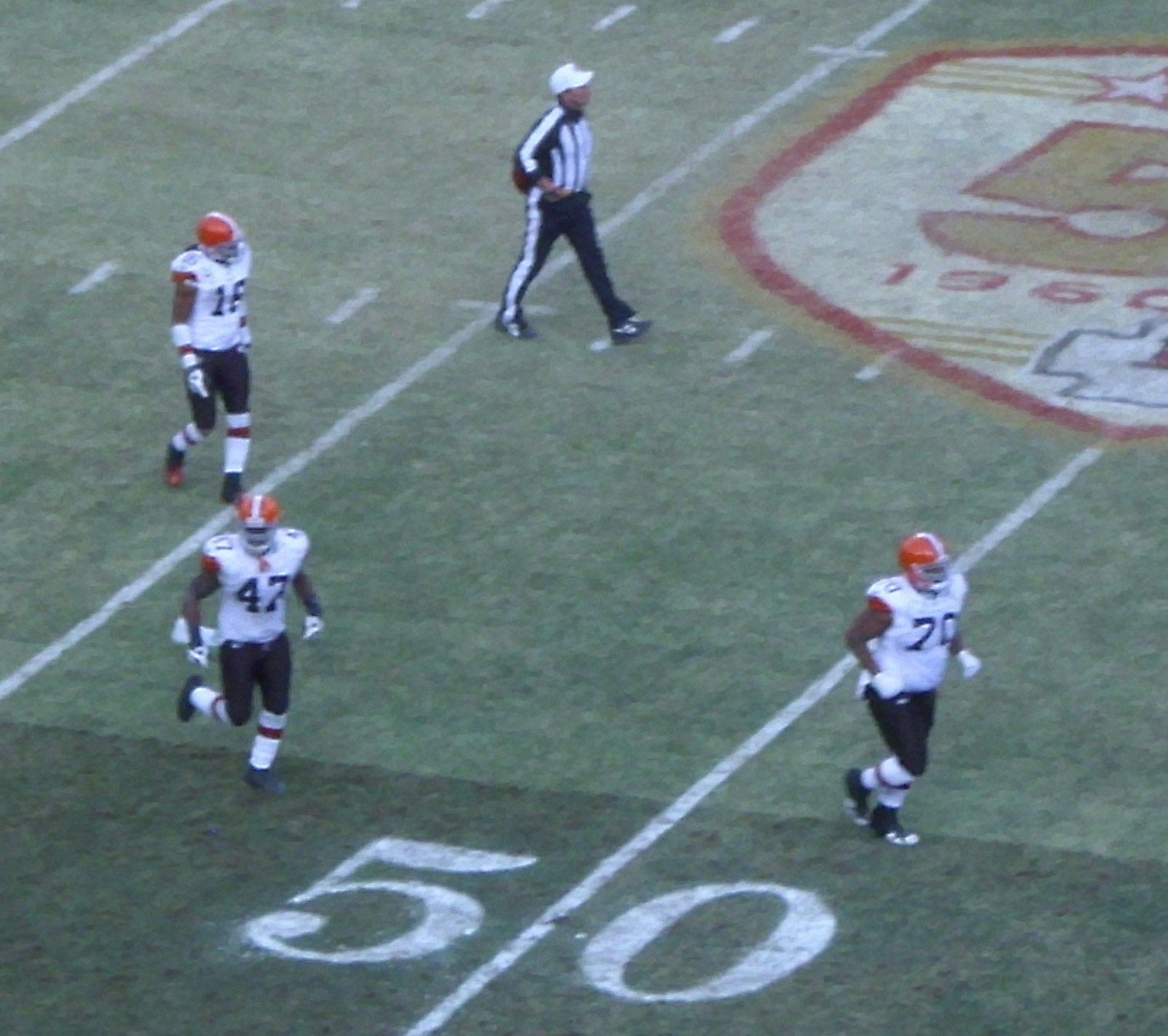
- Hadnot (bottom right) with the Browns in 2009

No. 66, 70, 67
- Position: Guard

Personal information
- Born: January 28, 1982 (age 44); Lufkin, Texas, U.S.
- Listed height: 6 ft 2 in (1.88 m)
- Listed weight: 325 lb (147 kg)

Career information
- High school: Lufkin
- College: Houston
- NFL draft: 2004: 6th round, 174th overall pick

Career history
- Miami Dolphins (2004−2007); Cleveland Browns (2008−2009); Arizona Cardinals (2010−2011); San Diego Chargers (2012)

Awards and highlights
- First-team All-Conference USA (2003); Second-team All-Conference USA (2002)

Career NFL statistics
- Games played: 130
- Games started: 96
- Fumble recoveries: 2
- Stats at Pro Football Reference

Jonathan Rex Hadnot Jr. (born January 28, 1982) is an American former professional football player who was a guard in the National Football League (NFL). He played college football for the Houston Cougars and was selected by the Miami Dolphins in the sixth round of the 2004 NFL draft.

Hadnot also played for the Cleveland Browns, Arizona Cardinals, and San Diego Chargers.

== Early life ==
Hadnot attended Lufkin High School in Lufkin, Texas, where he was named the best offensive lineman in District 12-5A in 1998. Hadnot started on the offensive line during his junior and senior years, and was named to the Second-Team All-District squad as a junior in 1997 and a First-Team All-District 12-5A selection in his senior year, when he helped lead his team to a 10–4 overall record and reached the quarterfinals of the state playoffs. His high school teammate was former NFL safety Terrence Kiel.

== College career ==
Hadnot was a four-year letterman (2000–2003) and three-year starter (2001–2003) at Houston, where he was an economics major. He chose to attend Houston over Arkansas, Auburn and Texas A&M.

He was redshirted as a freshman in 1999. Hadnot played in all 11 games as a redshirt freshman, spending the season as a backup to Nathan Woody and Darnerius Watson at the guard position. Hadnot saw some action on special teams, lining up on field goals and extra points.

As a sophomore in 2000, Hadnot started every game of the season. He did not give up a sack in over 400 passing attempts. He was named Houston Offensive Player of the Week versus Texas Christian and Southern Miss. He had a season-high 19 knockdown blocks against Southern Miss, and also had double-digit knockdown blocks against Cincinnati (12), South Florida (17) and Louisville (11). On the year, he recorded 104 knockdown blocks and 46 pancakes.

In 2002, Hadnot started every game for the second straight season, extending his starting streak to 23. He was a second-team All-Conference USA selection and did not allowed a sack in 11 of 12 games. The only sack came he allowed came in season opener versus Rice. He was named UH Offensive Player of the Week for performance against Texas, grading out at 85% against the Longhorns. On the year, he graded out at 89%.

Hadnot started all 13 games at center as a senior in 2003 after playing guard his first three seasons. He was named as a first-team All-Conference USA pick and did not allow a sack in more than 400 pass attempts. He also set team record with 196 knockdown blocks. He played in the Hula Bowl following the season.

== Professional career ==
=== Miami Dolphins ===
Hadnot was selected by the Miami Dolphins in the sixth round (174th overall) of the 2004 NFL draft. The Dolphins used a pick obtained on draft day from the Atlanta Falcons to select Hadnot.

He went on to play in 15 games, starting seven, during his rookie season. He dressed but did not play in one other. He made the first start of his NFL career at left guard in place of the injured Jeno James at Seattle on November 21. Hadnot also opened at that spot the following week at San Francisco. When James returned, Hadnot then started the final five games of the year at right guard.

Hadnot experienced a breakout year in 2005, starting all 16 games in which he played. He opened the first 13 contests at right guard and the final three at center in place of the injured Seth McKinney. Hadnot was an integral part of a line that yielded just 26 sacks - the fourth-lowest total in the NFL, and led a running game that averaged 118.6 yards an outing and 4.3 yards per rush attempt, which ranked seventh and fourth in the AFC, respectively. He took part in every offensive snap in 14 of 16 contests over the course of the year.

In 2006, Hadnot started all 16 games once again. However, like the Dolphins offensive line as a whole, Hadnot struggled and regressed from his success in 2005. Inconsistency at both guard positions as well as left tackle for most of the season had a negative effect on Hadnot's performance.

Following the 2007 season Hadnot received an extra $231,269 from the NFL's "Performance Based Pay" system, which is given by the league for players who outperform the value of their current contracts. Hadnot made the three-year veteran minimum of $425,000 during the 2006 season. It was announced on May 25, 2007, by Head Coach Cam Cameron that Rex Hadnot will switch back to right guard, leaving the center job up for grabs.

In 2008, Hadnot's rookie contract expired and he became an unrestricted free agent. The Dolphins showed no interest in re-signing him.

=== Cleveland Browns ===
On March 10, 2008, Hadnot was signed by the Cleveland Browns.

=== Arizona Cardinals ===
Hadnot signed with the Arizona Cardinals on March 10, 2010. He was released on March 18, 2012.

=== San Diego Chargers ===
Hadnot signed with the San Diego Chargers on April 30, 2012.

== Personal ==
Rex has a daughter, Kalyn Denise. Rex is a cousin of former Texas Tech running back James Hadnot, a third-round draft choice of the Kansas City Chiefs in 1980 who played with the Chiefs through 1983, and also a cousin of former NBA-ABA basketball player Jim Hadnot. He is also a cousin of Jermichael Finley, a former Texas tight end and third-round draft pick of the Green Bay Packers in 2008.
