= Dylan McFarland =

American football player (born 1980)

No. 79
- Position: Offensive tackle

Personal information
- Born: July 11, 1980 (age 46); Kalispell, Montana, U.S.
- Listed height: 6 ft 6 in (1.98 m)
- Listed weight: 290 lb (132 kg)

Career information
- High school: Flathead (MT)
- College: Montana
- NFL draft: 2004: 7th round, 207th overall pick

Career history
- Buffalo Bills (2004–2006)

Career NFL statistics
- Games played: 3
- Games started: 0
- Stats at Pro Football Reference

Dylan McFarland (born July 11, 1980) is an American former professional football player who was an offensive tackle for the Buffalo Bills in the National Football League (NFL) and the Hamburg Sea Devils in NFL Europa.

After playing college football for the Montana Grizzlies, twice earning All-American honors, McFarland was selected in the seventh round of the 2004 NFL draft with the 207th overall pick by the Bills. He spent most of his time with the Bills bouncing back and forth from the practice squad, and played maybe 18 NFL snaps in his career.
