= 2003 Montana State Bobcats football team =

American college football season

2003 Montana State Bobcats football

Big Sky co-champion

NCAA Division I-AA First Round, L 14–35 at Northern Iowa
- Conference: Big Sky Conference

Ranking
- Sports Network: No. 21
- Record: 7–6 (5–2 Big Sky)
- Head coach: Mike Kramer (4th season)
- Defensive coordinator: Pete Kwiatkowski (4th season)
- Home stadium: Bobcat Stadium

2003 Big Sky Conference football standings
	Conf.			Overall
Team	W		L	W		L
No. 14 Montana +^	5	–	2	9	–	4
No. 10 Northern Arizona +^	5	–	2	9	–	4
No. 21 Montana State +^	5	–	2	7	–	6
No. 22 Idaho State	4	–	3	8	–	4
Weber State	4	–	3	8	–	4
Eastern Washington	3	–	4	6	–	5
Portland State	1	–	6	4	–	7
Sacramento State	1	–	6	2	–	9
+ – Conference co-champions; ^ – NCAA Division I-AA playoff participant; Rankings from The Sports Network poll

The 2003 Montana State Bobcats football team was an American football team that represented Montana State University in the Big Sky Conference during the 2003 NCAA Division I-AA football season. In their fourth season under head coach Mike Kramer, the Bobcats compiled a 7–6 record (5–2 against Big Sky opponents) and finished in a three-way tie for the Big Sky championship with Montana and Northern Arizona. Montana State lost to Northern Iowa in the first round of the NCAA Division I-AA Football Championship playoffs and ranked No. 21 in the final I-AA poll by The Sports Network.

== Schedule ==
Date	Opponent	Rank	Site	Result	Attendance	Source
August 30	at Wyoming*	No. 15	War Memorial Stadium; Laramie, WY	L 10–21	17,407	
September 6	Gardner–Webb*	No. 16	Bobcat Stadium; Bozeman, MT	W 38–3	11,187	
September 20	at No. 21 Cal Poly*	No. 11	Mustang Stadium; San Luis Obispo, CA	L 21–24	8,458	
September 27	Northern Colorado*	No. 20	Bobcat Stadium; Bozeman, MT	L 10–14	11,577	
October 4	at Saint Mary's*		Saint Mary's Stadium; Moraga, CA	W 40–0	1,525	
October 11	No. 22 Idaho State^{†}		Bobcat Stadium; Bozeman, MT	L 17–23	13,527	
October 18	at Weber State		Stewart Stadium; Ogden, UT	W 26–3	7,721	
October 25	No. 10 Northern Arizona		Bobcat Stadium; Bozeman, MT	W 21–17	12,207	
November 1	Sacramento State		Bobcat Stadium; Bozeman, MT	W 56–7	8,767	
November 8	at Eastern Washington		Joe Albi Stadium; Spokane, WA	L 25–34	7,891	
November 15	at Portland State		PGE Park; Portland, OR	W 25–14		
November 22	No. 4 Montana		Bobcat Stadium; Bozeman, MT (rivalry)	W 27–20	15,087	
November 29	at No. 7 Northern Iowa*	No. 24	UNI-Dome; Cedar Falls, IA (NCAA Division I-AA First Round)	L 14–35	10,165	
*Non-conference game; ^{†}Homecoming; Rankings from The Sports Network Poll released prior to the game
