= 2003 Idaho State Bengals football team =

American college football season

2003 Idaho State Bengals football
- Conference: Big Sky Conference

Ranking
- Sports Network: No. 22
- Record: 8–4 (4–3 Big Sky)
- Head coach: Larry Lewis (5th season)
- Offensive coordinator: Bruce Barnum (3rd season)
- Offensive scheme: Pro spread
- Defensive coordinator: James Ward (4th season)
- Base defense: 4–3
- Home stadium: Holt Arena

2003 Big Sky Conference football standings
	Conf.			Overall
Team	W		L	W		L
No. 14 Montana +^	5	–	2	9	–	4
No. 10 Northern Arizona +^	5	–	2	9	–	4
No. 21 Montana State +^	5	–	2	7	–	6
No. 22 Idaho State	4	–	3	8	–	4
Weber State	4	–	3	8	–	4
Eastern Washington	3	–	4	6	–	5
Portland State	1	–	6	4	–	7
Sacramento State	1	–	6	2	–	9
+ – Conference co-champions; ^ – NCAA Division I-AA playoff participant; Rankings from The Sports Network poll

The 2003 Idaho State Bengals football team represented Idaho State University as a member of the Big Sky Conference during the 2003 NCAA Division I-AA football season. Led by fifth-year head coach Larry Lewis, the Bengals compiled an overall record of 8–4, with a mark of 4–3 in conference play, and finished tied for fourth in the Big Sky. The team played home games at Holt Arena in Pocatello, Idaho.

== Schedule ==
Date	Opponent	Rank	Site	Result	Attendance	Source
August 28	Montana Western*	No. 11	Holt Arena; Pocatello, ID	W 54–20		
September 6	at Boise State*	No. 10	Bronco Stadium; Boise, ID	L 0–62	30,664	
September 13	Northern Colorado*	No. 16	Holt Arena; Pocatello, ID	W 42–33		
September 27	at Sacramento State	No. 12	Hornet Stadium; Sacramento, CA	L 21–47	6,312	
October 4	Eastern Washington	No. 25	Holt Arena; Pocatello, ID	W 55–52 ^{2OT}		
October 11	at Montana State	No. 22	Bobcat Stadium; Bozeman, MT	W 23–17	13,527	
October 18	No. 5 Montana	No. 21	Holt Arena; Pocatello, ID	W 43–40 ^{2OT}	11,434	
October 25	at Weber State	No. 17	Stewart Stadium; Ogden, UT	L 21–38		
November 1	Portland State	No. 24	Holt Arena; Pocatello, ID	W 30–20	6,250	
November 8	at No. 20 Northern Arizona	No. 22	Walkup Skydome; Flagstaff, AZ	L 31–46	7,111	
November 15	at No. 20 Cal Poly*		Mustang Stadium; San Luis Obispo, CA	W 38–31		
November 22	Southern Utah*	No. 24	Holt Arena; Pocatello, ID	W 36–17		
*Non-conference game; Rankings from The Sports Network Poll released prior to the game
