= 2003 NCAA Division I-AA football rankings =

The 2003 NCAA Division I-AA football rankings are from the Sports Network poll of Division I-AA head coaches, athletic directors, sports information directors and media members. This is for the 2003 season.

== Legend ==
	Increase in ranking
	Decrease in ranking
	Not ranked previous week
(#–#)	Win–loss record
(Italics)	Number of first place votes
т	Tied with team above or below also with this symbol

== The Sports Network poll ==
	Preseason	Week 1 Sept 2	Week 2 Sept 9	Week 3 Sept 16	Week 4 Sept 23	Week 5 Sept 30	Week 6 Oct 7	Week 7 Oct 14	Week 8 Oct 21	Week 9 Oct 28	Week 10 Nov 4	Week 11 Nov 11	Week 12 Nov 18	Week 13 Nov 25	Week 14 Postseason	
1.	McNeese State (25)	McNeese State (1–0) (58)	Western Illinois (2–0) (41)	McNeese State (2–1) (61)	McNeese State (3–1) (76)	McNeese State (3–1) (76)	McNeese State (4–1) (74)	McNeese State (4–1) (64)	McNeese State (5–1) (91)	McNeese State (6–1) (80)	McNeese State (7–1) (74)	McNeese State (8–1) (79)	McNeese State (9–1) (80)	McNeese State (10–1) (70)	Delaware (15–1) (58)	1.
2.	Georgia Southern (16)	Georgia Southern (0–0) (8)	Georgia Southern (1–0) (42)	Western Illinois (2–1) (20)	Western Illinois (3–1) (13)	Western Illinois (3–1) (13)	Western Illinois (4–1) (18)	Western Illinois (5–1) (26)	Villanova (6–0) (11)	Delaware (8–0) (21)	Delaware (9–0) (15)	Southern Illinois (10–0) (13)	Wofford (10–1) (6)	Wofford (10–1) (5)	Colgate (15–1)	2.
3.	Western Illinois (15)	Montana (1–0) (7)	McNeese State (1–1) (19)	Western Kentucky (2–0) (15)	Western Kentucky (3–0) (12)	Villanova (4–0) (12)	Villanova (5–0) (9)	Villanova (6–0) (12)	Delaware (7–0) (2)	Southern Illinois (8–0) (2)	Southern Illinois (9–0) (8)	UMass (9–1) (3)	Delaware (10–1) (1)	Delaware (11–1) (6)	Wofford (12–2)	3.
4.	Montana (5)	Western Illinois (1–0) (13)	Western Kentucky (2–0) (7)	Northeastern (3–0) (3)	Northeastern (4–0) (1)	Delaware (4–0) (1)	Delaware (5–0) (1)	Delaware (6–0) (1)	Southern Illinois (7–0) (4)	UMass (7–1)	UMass (8–1)	Wofford (9–1) (3)	Montana (9–2) (3)	Southern Illinois (10–1) (2)	Florida Atlantic (11–3)	4.
5.	Western Kentucky (17)	Western Kentucky (1–0) (8)	Northeastern (2–0)	Villanova (3–0) (3)	Villanova (3–0) (2)	Bethune-Cookman (4–0) (1)	Furman (4–1) (1)	Montana (5–1)	UMass (6–1)	Wofford (7–1)	Wofford (8–1) (1)	Montana (8–2)	Southern Illinois (10–1)	UMass (10–2)	Northern Iowa (10–3)	5.
6.	Northeastern	Northeastern (1–0)	Villanova (2–0) (2)	Georgia Southern (1–1)	Bethune-Cookman (3–0)	Western Kentucky (3–1) (2)	Montana (4–1)	UMass (5–1)	Wofford (6–1)	Northern Iowa (7–1)	Northern Iowa (8–1) (1)	Delaware (9–1)	Colgate (11–0)	Colgate (12–0)	Western Illinois (9–4)	6.
7.	Grambling State (2)	Furman (1–0)	Bethune-Cookman (2–0)	Bethune-Cookman (2–0)	Delaware (3–0)	Furman (3–1) (1)	UMass (4–1)	Southern Illinois (6–0)	Western Illinois (5–2)	Villanova (6–1)	Villanova (7–1)	Colgate (10–0)	UMass (9–2)	Northern Iowa (9–2)	Western Kentucky (9–4)	7.
8.	Furman	Bethune-Cookman (1–0)	Furman (1–1)	Delaware (2–0)	Furman (2–1)	Montana (3–1)	Southern Illinois (5–0)	Wofford (5–1)	Western Kentucky (5–2)	Western Kentucky (6–2)	Montana (7–2)	Penn (8–0)	Northern Iowa (9–2)	Penn (10–0)	McNeese State (10–2)	8.
9.	Appalachian State	Villanova (1–0)	Fordham (2–0)	Furman (1–1)	Montana (2–1)	UMass (3–1)	Western Kentucky (3–2) (1)	Western Kentucky (4–2)	Northern Iowa (6–1)	Bethune-Cookman (6–1)	Penn (7–0)	Western Kentucky (7–3)	Penn (9–0)	Western Kentucky (8–3)	Southern Illinois (10–2)	9.
10.	Bethune-Cookman	Idaho State (1–0)	UMass (1–0)	Montana (2–1)	UMass (2–1)	Northeastern (4–1)	Wofford (4–1)	Georgia Southern (4–2)	Northern Arizona (6–1)	Montana (6–2)	Colgate (9–0)	Western Illinois (7–3)	Western Kentucky (8–3)	Western Illinois (8–3)	Northern Arizona (9–4)	10.
11.	Idaho State	Appalachian State (0–1)	Delaware (1–0)	Montana State (1–1)	Northwestern State (3–1)	Southern Illinois (4–0)	Georgia Southern (3–2)	Northern Iowa (5–1)	Bethune-Cookman (6–1)	Penn (6–0)	Western Illinois (6–3)	Northern Iowa (8–2)	Western Illinois (8–3)	Montana (9–3)	UMass (10–3)	11.
12.	Villanova	UMass (0–0)	Montana (1–1)	UMass (1–1)	Idaho State (2–1)	Wofford (3–1)	Northern Iowa (4–1)	Bethune-Cookman (5–1)	Montana (5–2)	Colgate (8–0)	Western Kentucky (6–3)	Grambling State (8–2)	Grambling State (9–2)	Grambling State (9–2)	Penn (10–0)	12.
13.	Fordham	Fordham (1–0)	Montana State (1–1)	Grambling State (2–1)	Southern Illinois (3–0)	Georgia Southern (2–2)	Bethune-Cookman (4–1)	Furman (4–2)	Penn (5–0)	Western Illinois (5–3)	Grambling State (7–2)	Villanova (7–2)	North Carolina A&T (10–1)	Florida Atlantic (9–2)	Southern (12–1)	13.
14.	UMass	Delaware (0–0)	Grambling State (1–1)	Idaho State (2–1)	Cal Poly (3–0)	Fordham (3–1)	Northern Arizona (4–1)	Northern Arizona (5–1)	Southern (7–0)	Grambling State (6–2)	North Carolina A&T (8–1)	North Carolina A&T (9–1)	Florida Atlantic (8–2)	Bethune-Cookman (9–2)	Montana (9–4)	14.
15.	Montana State	Grambling State (0–1)	Eastern Illinois (1–0)	Northwestern State (2–1)	Wofford (2–1)	Penn (2–0)	Penn (3–0)	Penn (4–0)	Grambling State (5–2)	Northern Arizona (6–2)	Florida Atlantic (7–2)	Florida Atlantic (7–2)	Bethune-Cookman (8–2)	Southern (10–1)	Bethune–Cookman (9–3)	15.
16.	Maine	Montana State (0–1)	Idaho State (1–1)	Maine (2–1)	Georgia Southern (1–2)	Northern Iowa (3–1)	Grambling State (3–2)	Grambling State (4–2)	Colgate (7–0)	Harvard (6–0)	Southern (8–1)	Bethune-Cookman (7–2)	Southern (10–1)	Northern Arizona (8–3)	North Carolina A&T (10–3)	16.
17.	Delaware	Eastern Illinois (1–0)	Stephen F. Austin (1–0)	Southern Illinois (3–0)	Fordham (3–1)	Northern Arizona (3–1)	Colgate (5–0)	Southern (6–0) (1)	Idaho State (5–2)	Florida Atlantic (6–2)	Bethune-Cookman (6–2)	Southern (9–1)	Northern Arizona (8–3)	Jacksonville State (8–3)	Grambling State (9–3)	17.
18.	Eastern Illinois	Northwestern State (1–0)	Maine (1–1)	Fordham (2–1)	Grambling State (2–2)	Grambling State (2–2)	Southern (5–0)	Colgate (6–0)	Northwestern State (6–2)	Southern (7–1)	Furman (5–3)	Northern Arizona (7–3)	Villanova (7–3)	North Carolina A&T (10–2)	Jacksonville State (8–4)	18.
19.	Wofford	Nicholls State (1–0)	Northwestern State (1–1)	Eastern Illinois (1–1)	Lehigh (3–0)	Colgate (4–0)	Northeastern (4–2)	Northwestern State (5–2)	Georgia Southern (4–3)	North Carolina A&T (7–1)	Fordham (7–2)	Fordham (8–2)	Jacksonville State (7–3)	Northern Colorado (9–2)	Northern Colorado (9–2)	19.
20.	Southeast Missouri State	Maine (0–1)	Nicholls State (1–1)	Lehigh (2–0)	Montana State (1–2)	Cal Poly (3–1)	Northwestern State (4–2)	Maine (4–2)	Harvard (5–0)	Furman (5–3)	Northern Arizona (6–3)	Cal Poly (6–3)	Northern Colorado (8–2)	Northeastern (8–4)	Northeastern (8–4)	20.
21.	Penn	Penn (0–0)	Southern Illinois (2–0)	Cal Poly (2–0)	Penn (1–0)	Northwestern State (3–2)	Maine (4–2)	Idaho State (4–2)	Florida Atlantic (6–2)	Hampton (6–1)	Northwestern State (6–3)	Jacksonville State (6–3)	Northeastern (7–4)	Idaho State (8–4)	Montana State (7–6)	21.
22.	Northwestern State	Southeast Missouri State (0–1)	Penn (0–0)	Portland State (2–0)	Colgate (3–0)	Southern (4–0)	Idaho State (3–2)	Harvard (4–0)	Furman (4–3)	Fordham (6–2)	Idaho State (6–3)	Northern Colorado (7–2)	Georgia Southern (7–4)	Georgia Southern (7–4)	Idaho State (8–4)	22.
23.	Nicholls State	Stephen F. Austin (0–0)	Eastern Kentucky (1–1)	Penn (0–0)	Illinois State (3–1)	Maine (3–2)	Harvard (3–0)	Florida Atlantic (5–2)	North Carolina A&T (6–1)	Northwestern State (6–3)	Harvard (6–1)	Northeastern (6–4)	Maine (7–4)	Villanova (7–4)	Lehigh (8–3)	23.
24.	Stephen F. Austin	Florida Atlantic (1–0)	Wofford (1–1)	Colgate (2–0)	Maine (2–2)	Lehigh (3–1)	Cal Poly (3–2)	Fordham (4–2)	Fordham (5–2)	Idaho State (5–3)	Lehigh (6–2)	Georgia Southern (6–4)	Idaho State (7–4)	Montana State (7–5)	Georgia Southern (7–4)	24.
25.	Eastern Kentucky	Wofford (0–1)	Cal Poly (1–0)	Wofford (1–1)	Northern Arizona (2–1)	Idaho State (2–2)	Fordham (3–2)	North Carolina A&T (5–1)	Hampton (5–1)	The Citadel (5–3)	Hampton (6–2)	Furman (5–4)	Fordham (8–3)	Lehigh (8–3)	Villanova (7–4)	25.
	Preseason	Week 1 Sept 2	Week 2 Sept 9	Week 3 Sept 16	Week 4 Sept 23	Week 5 Sept 30	Week 6 Oct 7	Week 7 Oct 14	Week 8 Oct 21	Week 9 Oct 28	Week 10 Nov 4	Week 11 Nov 11	Week 12 Nov 18	Week 13 Nov 25	Week 14 Postseason	
		Dropped: 25 Eastern Kentucky	Dropped: 11 Appalachian State; 22 Southeast Missouri State; 24 Florida Atlantic	Dropped: 17 Stephen F. Austin; 20 Nicholls State; 23 Eastern Kentucky	Dropped: 19 Eastern Illinois; 22 Portland State	Dropped: 20 Montana State; 23 Illinois State	Dropped: 24 Lehigh	Dropped: 19 Northeastern; 24 Cal Poly	Dropped: 20 Maine	Dropped: 19 Georgia Southern	Dropped: 25 The Citadel	Dropped: 21 Northwestern State; 22 Idaho State; 23 Harvard; 24 Lehigh; 25 Hampton	Dropped: 20 Cal Poly; 25 Furman	Dropped: 23 Maine; 25 Fordham	None	
