= DeAngelo Williams =

American football player (born 1983)

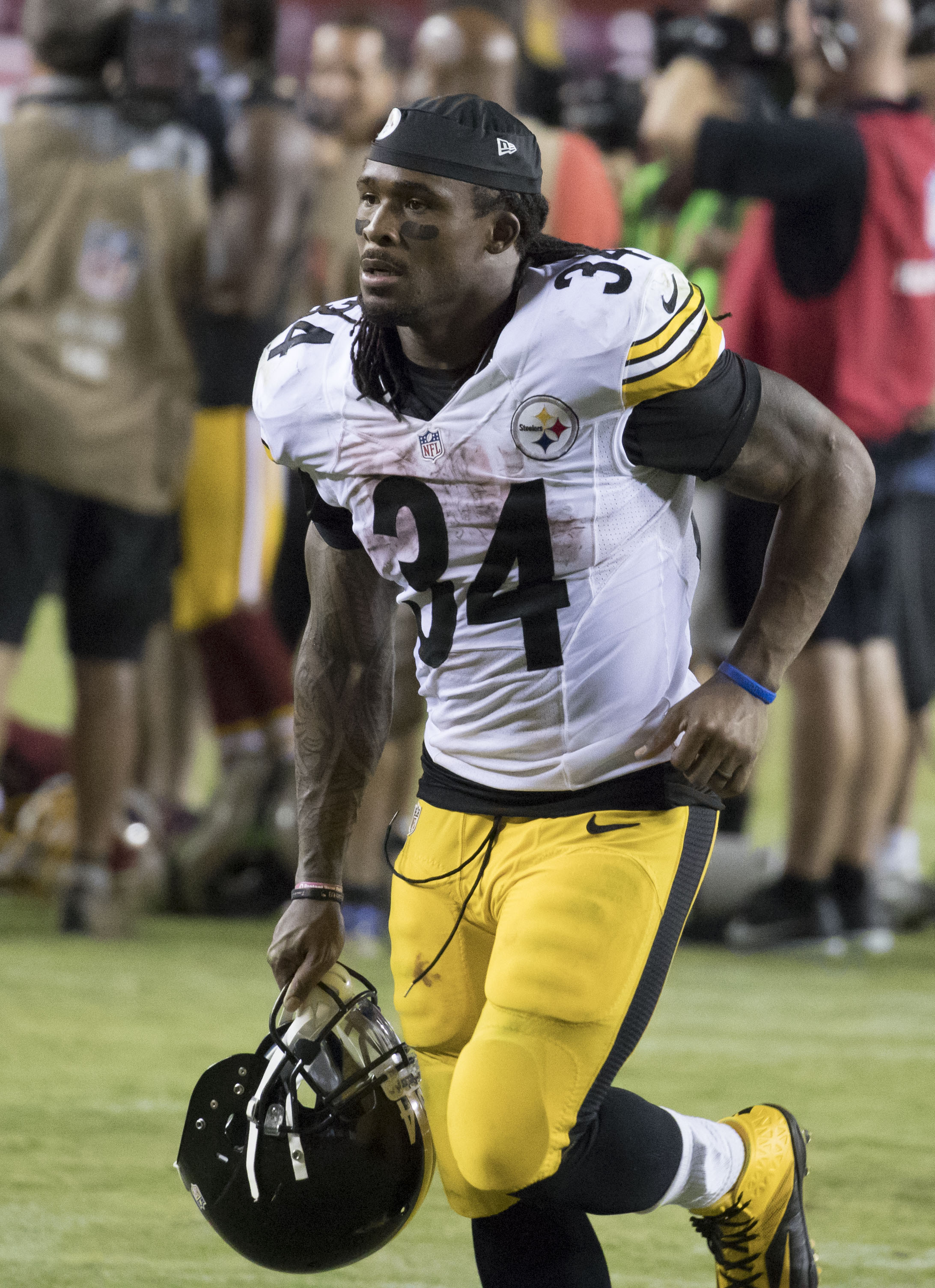
- Williams with the Pittsburgh Steelers in 2016
- Born: DeAngelo Chondon Williams; April 25, 1983 (age 43); Little Rock, Arkansas, U.S.
- Football career

No. 34
- Position: Running back

Personal information
- Listed height: 5 ft 9 in (1.75 m)
- Listed weight: 207 lb (94 kg)

Career information
- High school: Wynne (Wynne, Arkansas)
- College: Memphis (2002–2005)
- NFL draft: 2006: 1st round, 27th overall pick

Career history
- Carolina Panthers (2006–2014); Pittsburgh Steelers (2015–2016)

Awards and highlights
- Second-team All-Pro (2008); Pro Bowl (2009); 2× NFL rushing touchdowns leader (2008, 2015); First-team All-American (2005); Third-team All-American (2004); NCAA rushing yards leader (2005); NCAA rushing touchdowns leader (2004); 3× C-USA Offensive Player of the Year (2003–2005); 3× First-team All-C-USA (2003–2005); Memphis Tigers No. 20 retired

Career NFL statistics
- Rushing yards: 8,096
- Rushing average: 4.7
- Rushing touchdowns: 61
- Receptions: 236
- Receiving yards: 2,106
- Receiving touchdowns: 9
- Stats at Pro Football Reference
- College Football Hall of Fame
- Professional wrestling career
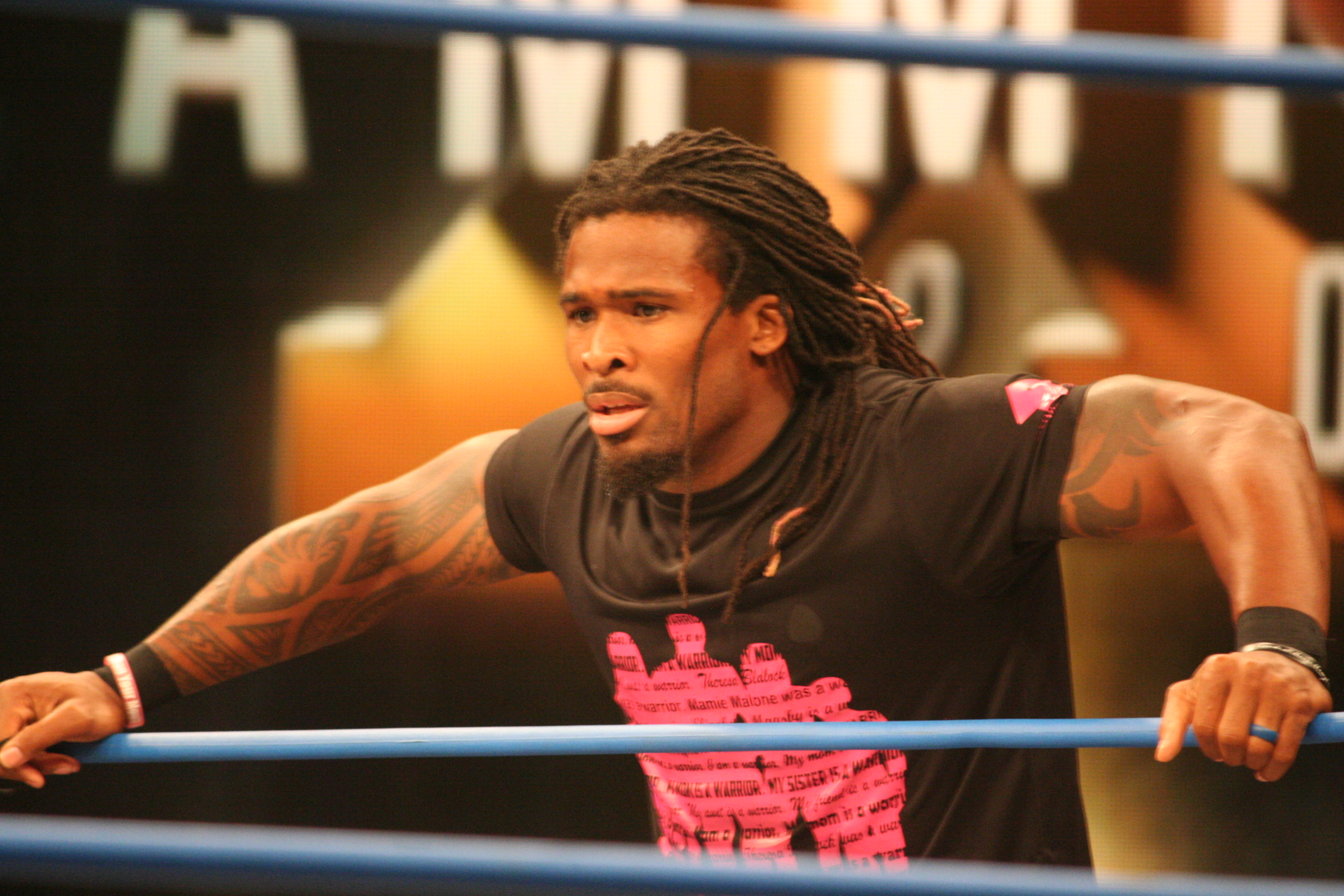
- Williams at Slammiversary in 2017
- Ring name: DeAngelo Williams
- Billed height: 5 ft 9 in (175 cm)
- Billed weight: 207 lb (94 kg)
- Trained by: Scott D'Amore
- Debut: July 2, 2017
- Website: deangelowilliams34.org

DeAngelo Chondon Williams (born April 25, 1983) is an American professional wrestler and former football running back who played in the National Football League (NFL) for 11 seasons. He played college football for the Memphis Tigers, earning first-team All-American honors in 2005. Williams was selected by the Carolina Panthers in the first round of the 2006 NFL draft. He starred in a dual role in Carolina alongside Jonathan Stewart until being released in the 2014 offseason. Williams then played for the Pittsburgh Steelers from 2015 to 2016.

== Early life ==
Williams was considered the top running back in the state of Arkansas in 2001, having played for the Yellowjackets football team at Wynne High School in Wynne, Arkansas. He missed most of his sophomore season with a broken bone in his foot. As a junior, Williams gained 1,044 yards rushing and scored 14 touchdowns, leading him to be named to the Arkansas All-State team in 2000. As a senior, he rushed for a single-season record 2,204 yards and 34 touchdowns, averaging 10.4 yards per carry while leading his squad to the state 4A championship. Williams had 939 yards rushing in four playoff games, including 26 carries for 302 yards and six touchdowns against Greenwood; in the state championship game against Stuttgart, he rushed for 194 yards on 24 attempts, scoring two rushing touchdowns, one receiving touchdown and one return touchdown. Williams was named the Arkansas Democrat-Gazette 2001 Offensive Player of the Year and was selected to the Associated Press Arkansas Super Team in 2001.

Williams was a letterman in track & field. He still holds the state 4A record in the 100-meter dash with an electronically timed 10.81 seconds. Williams helped lead Wynne to a second-place finish in the 2001 state track championships.

Williams was rated as the 25th best running back prospect in the nation, the number two overall prospect in the state of Arkansas and was named to the All-America and All-Region Team by SuperPrep. He was recruited by Ole Miss, Arkansas, and Iowa before deciding on Memphis.

== College career ==
Williams attended the University of Memphis, where he played for the Memphis Tigers football team.

=== 2002 season ===
Entering Memphis, Williams was a highly touted signee. He played in 10 games as a true freshman. In his first career game, a 52–6 victory over Murray State, Williams racked up 129 rushing yards, on 12 rushes, and a touchdown, marking the second most rushing yards in school history by a true freshman. Against Tulane, he gained 166 rushing yards, including an 86-yard touchdown, in the 38–10 victory. For his performance in the Tulane game, Williams received the Conference USA Player of the Week. While playing Louisville, he suffered a knee sprain and was forced to sit out the next week's contest against Mississippi State. Williams had a career-high two rushing touchdowns against Army, as well as 10 carries and 110 rushing yards, in the 38–10 victory. He led the team with 684 rushing yards, 103 carries and five rushing touchdowns.

=== 2003 season ===
In the 2003 regular season opener against Tennessee Tech, Williams had 61 rushing yards and a rushing touchdown in the 40–10 victory. He had career highs of 135 receiving yards and two receiving touchdowns playing against the Golden Eagles. The following week against Mississippi, Williams recorded 131 rushing yards, 36 receiving yards, and two rushing touchdowns in the 44–34 victory. He gained over 100 yards the following week against Southern Mississippi, finishing the game with 158 rushing yards, in the 23–6 loss. After a 108-yard game in a 38–16 victory over Arkansas State and another 107-yard game in a 24–10 loss to UAB the following week, Williams tied the school record with four consecutive games with at least 100 rushing yards. The game after, he broke the record after posting 119 rushing yards against Mississippi State in a 35–27 loss. Williams continued the streak against the Houston Cougars with 120 rushing yards and two touchdowns in a 45–14 victory. The next week, he had a career-high 195 rushing yards and two touchdowns, in the 41–9 victory against Tulane. Playing East Carolina, Williams made the record eight consecutive games with at least 100 rushing yards in the 41–24 victory. With the 137 yards rushing, he broke the school record for single season rushing yards. Williams continued to break records the next week, when he broke the school record for attempts in a single season. Williams had 154 rushing yard and one rushing touchdown on 27 attempts in the 37–7 victory over Louisville. The next week, in a win over Cincinnati, he posted 136 rushing yards but tore his MCL during the 21–16 victory, ending his record-breaking season. Williams ended the season with over 1,400 rushing yards, the most in school history, and leading the nation in all-purpose yards. He was named as the 2003 Conference USA Offensive Player of the Year.

=== 2004 season ===
After missing the last two regular season games and the New Orleans Bowl, Williams returned in the 2004 season opener against Mississippi. With 118 rushing yards in the 20–13 victory, he made it 11 consecutive games with over 100 rushing yards, continuing the streak he began the previous season, and having a career-high 37 attempts. While playing against Chattanooga, Williams gained 136 rushing yards, three rushing touchdowns, 87 receiving yards, and a touchdown reception in the 52–21 victory. His four touchdowns marked a career-high for a single game. His streak ended a few weeks later, at 13 when UAB held Williams to 92 rushing yards in the 35–28 loss. In the next game, against Houston, he had 33 carries for 262 rushing yards and four rushing touchdowns in the 41–14 victory. Williams' 262 rushing yards was the most by a Tiger for a home game in school history. Two weeks later against Tulane, he had 19 carries for 132 rushing yards and two rushing touchdowns in the 49–24 victory. After the Tulane game, Williams had 57 yards in a 49–10 loss against Cincinnati before going on a massively productive run for the Tigers. On November 4 against Louisville, he had 26 carries for 200 rushing yards and one rushing touchdown in the 56–49 loss. In the Tigers' next game, Williams recorded 27 carries for 199 rushing yards and two rushing touchdowns in the 30–26 victory over Southern Miss. He followed that up with 32 carries for 225 rushing yards and four rushing touchdowns against East Carolina in the 38–35 victory. In the Tigers' regular season finale against South Florida on the road, Williams had 28 carries for a school-record 263 rushing yards and two rushing touchdowns in the 31–15 victory. His junior season ended when he broke his leg while playing Bowling Green in the GMAC Bowl on December 22. Williams finished his junior year leading the nation with 22 rushing touchdowns and second with 1,948 rushing yards to go along with 18 receptions for 210 yards and a touchdown. For the second straight year, he was named as the Conference USA Offensive Player of the Year. Williams scored a total of 138 points, which broke the previous record set by Stephen Gostkowski in 2003, and 23 total touchdowns, breaking the previous mark of 14 by Dave Casinelli in 1963. Williams would hold these records until 2018, when Darrell Henderson broke them. In three separate games, Williams scored 24 total points, which remains a school record to this day albeit tied with four other players. Williams was named to the 2004 Pro Football Weekly All-America Team. He earned the Tennessee Sports Writers Association Player of the Year Award.

=== 2005 season ===
Before the 2005 season, Williams was considered to be a Heisman Trophy candidate. He was named by the Touchdown Club of Columbus as a "Player to Watch" in 2005. Williams started his senior season being held to 85 rushing yards on 24 carries in a 10–6 loss to Ole Miss but followed that up with ten consecutive games with over 100 yards rushing. While playing against Chattanooga, Williams rushed for 205 yards on 20 carries in the 59–14 victory. He recorded 223 yards on 30 carries in a 37–31 loss to Tulsa. The next week, Williams posted 236 rushing yards on 35 carries in a 27–20 victory over UTEP. The following week, he had 14 carries for 136 yards in a road loss to Central Florida. He followed that up with 33 carries for 198 yards and two touchdowns in a road win over Houston. Williams continued his productive season the next week when he accumulated 226 rushing yards on 39 carries and two touchdowns in a 27–24 victory over East Carolina. Williams' 39 carries were the second-most for a single game in school history. On November 1, he had 21 carries for 167 rushing yards in a home loss to UAB. 18 days later, Williams had 36 carries for 123 rushing yards and one rushing touchdown in a road win over Southern Miss. He finished the regular season with 127 rushing yards in a 26–3 victory over Marshall. In his final college game, the 2005 Motor City Bowl, Williams helped Memphis defeat the Akron Zips 38–31, by running for a Bowl record 238 yards and scoring three touchdowns. His performance made him the top ground-gainer in college football in 2005 with 1,964 yards. Williams was also an All-America selection by the American Football Coaches Association (AFCA) and the Walter Camp Foundation. He earned the Amateur Athlete of the Year Award at the Tennessee Sports Hall of Fame.

Williams was a finalist for the 2005 Doak Walker Award, which was awarded to Reggie Bush. He came in seventh overall in the Heisman Trophy voting. In 2005, Williams was named the inaugural winner of the ARA Sportsmanship Award, presented by the Awards and Recognition Association to the Division I football player who best exhibits sportsmanship both on and off the field. For the third straight year, he was named as the Conference USA Offensive Player of the Year.

=== Legacy ===
Williams finished his collegiate career with 6,026 rushing yards. Darrell Henderson was the closest challenger to Williams's rushing yards mark with 3,545 yards from 2016 to 2018. In addition, he totaled 55 rushing touchdowns, 19 more than Casinelli and Henderson. Williams was the only player in school history to have ten 100-yard games in a single season, a feat he accomplished in three separate seasons. As a result, his 34 100-yard rushing games are more than double the next highest total of 16 by Henderson. Williams holds the Division I National Collegiate Athletic Association (NCAA) record for 100-yard rushing games (34) and All-purpose yards (7,573). He also ranks sixth on the all-time NCAA rushing list with 6,026 yards. Starting in 2012, Memphis named their "Most Valuable Player" award as the "DeAngelo Williams MVP Award", which is given out annually at their football banquets.

== Professional career ==
=== 2006 NFL draft ===
Pre-draft measurables
| Height | Weight | Arm length | Hand span | 40-yard dash | 20-yard shuttle | Three-cone drill | Vertical jump | Broad jump | Bench press |
|---|---|---|---|---|---|---|---|---|---|
| 5 ft 9 in (1.75 m) | 214 lb (97 kg) | 30 1/2 in (0.77 m) | 9 3/8 in (0.24 m) | 4.45 s | 4.10 s | 6.57 s | 35.5 in (0.90 m) | 10 ft 1 in (3.07 m) | 25 reps |
Bench press, vertical jump, broad jump, measurables from NFL Combine. All other values from Pro Day.

In January, Williams attended the 2006 Senior Bowl in Mobile, Alabama, an annual event in which college seniors and professional prospects are evaluated by NFL personnel in preparation for the NFL draft. His height was officially measured at 5'9, which led some scouts to question his potential as an undersized back in the NFL. However, scouting reports soon placed him among the most impressive performers during the practice week leading up to the Bowl, and Williams punctuated the week with a strong, if brief, showing in the game itself, rushing for 31 yards on three carries and catching two passes for 28 yards. For the NFL Combine, Williams trained at D1 Sports Training in Nashville, Tennessee.

On March 24, at the Pro Day on the University of Memphis campus, Williams ostensibly improved his draft stock even further with an exceptional workout. He ran his 40-yard dash in 4.40 seconds with the wind and 4.48 seconds against the wind. He also impressed in the short shuttle, the three-cone drill, and the long shuttle. In addition, he recorded a 34½-inch vertical jump and a 10-foot-9 broad jump and caught the ball well in receiving drills.

=== Carolina Panthers ===
Though at one point he was considered a top ten pick, with some projecting him as high as #4 overall to the New York Jets, Williams saw his draft stock fall in weeks preceding the draft, as many teams filled their needs at the running back position via free agency. On April 29, 2006, he was selected by the Carolina Panthers in the first round with the 27th overall pick in the NFL Draft. He joined Reggie Bush, LenDale White, Laurence Maroney, and Joseph Addai, among others, in a promising draft class at running back. He became the highest drafted player out of the Memphis Tigers program since Keith Simpson was drafted 9th overall in the 1st round in 1978, and Bob Rush went 24th overall in 1977. In addition, he became the highest drafted running back from the Memphis Tigers. Williams adopted the jersey #34, which he wore in high school, and which was the same as his hero at the time, Ricky Williams.

==== 2006 season ====
Williams played in the first five games of the 2006 season and looked promising as an alternative to DeShaun Foster in the Carolina backfield, compiling an average of 5.3 yards per carry. In Week 2, against the Minnesota Vikings, he had 13 carries for 74 rushing yards and his first professional touchdown, a three-yard rush in the second quarter, in the 16–13 loss. He missed Weeks 6 through 8 with a sprained ankle. In Week 11 against the St. Louis Rams, Williams filled in for Foster, who had injured his elbow, and totaled 20 carries for 114 rushing yards in the 15–0 victory. In a Monday Night Football game against the Philadelphia Eagles, Williams started for an injured Foster and managed 74 rushing yards on 17 carries and an impressive 101 receiving yards on seven catches with a receiving touchdown in the 27–24 loss. The 35-yard reception from quarterback Jake Delhomme was Williams's first receiving touchdown as a professional. He appeared in 13 games, of which he started two. Overall, he totaled 121 carries for 501 rushing yards and one rushing touchdown to go along with 33 receptions for 313 receiving yards and one receiving touchdown.

==== 2007 season ====
In the 2007 season, Williams continued to back up DeShaun Foster. He had his first 100-yard game of the season in Week 6 against the Arizona Cardinals with 10 carries for 121 rushing yards. In the fourth quarter, he clinched the 25–10 victory with a 75-yard run, the longest in team history, only to be tackled short of the goal line. On the next play, he ran the ball to the right corner of endzone for his first touchdown of the season. The next five weeks, he had 97 total rushing yards due to limited playing time. In the final week of the regular season, Williams rushed for 121 yards on 20 carries while scoring two touchdowns in the 31–23 victory over the Tampa Bay Buccaneers. He finished the season with 144 carries for 717 rushing yards and led the team with four rushing touchdowns. He finished ninth in the NFL in yards per carry (5.0).

==== 2008 season ====
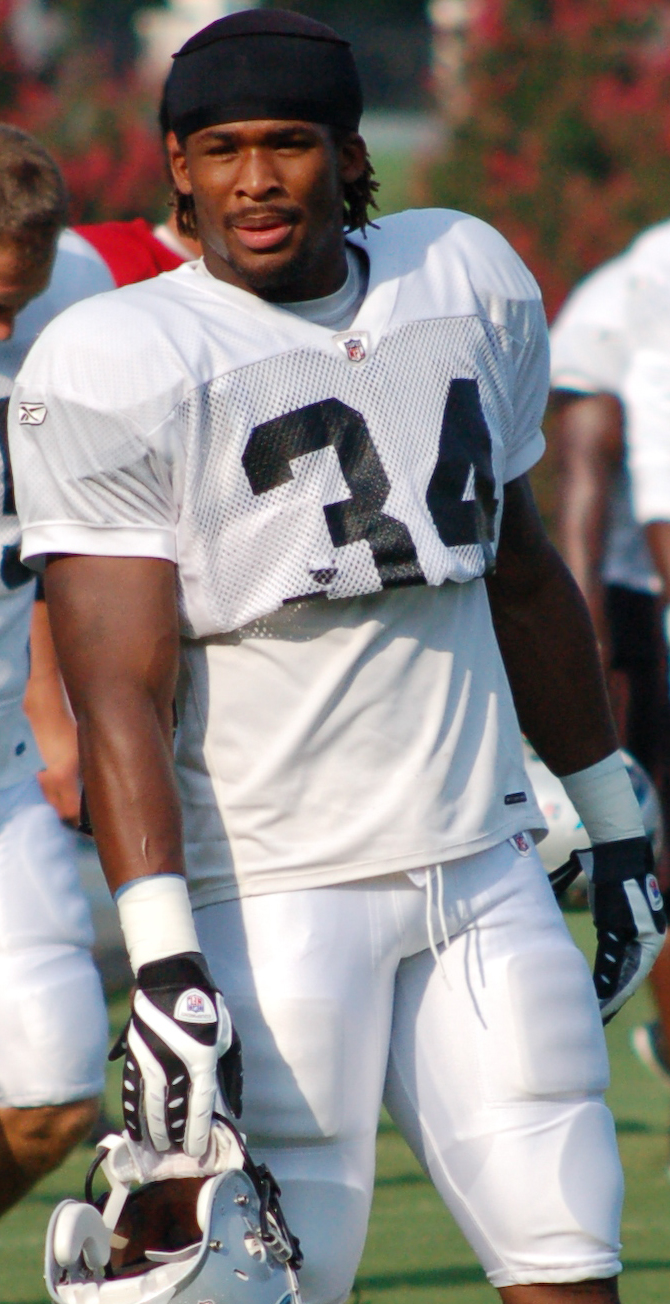
Williams in 2008

Williams established himself as the starting running back for the Panthers prior to the 2008 season. During the 2008 season, Williams shared carries with rookie first-round pick Jonathan Stewart, though Williams received a majority of the work. In Week 5, he had 20 carries for 123 rushing yards to go along with 25-yard receiving touchdown in the 34–0 victory over the Kansas City Chiefs. Starting in Week 8, Williams recorded four consecutive games rushing for at least 100 yards and a rushing touchdown with the Panthers going 3–1 in that stretch. On November 30, Williams set a franchise record for rushing touchdowns in one game by scoring four times in a Week 13 game against the Green Bay Packers where the Panthers won 35–31. In Week 14, Williams was selected FedEx Ground Player-of-the-Week after a dominating performance in which he rushed for 186 yards on 19 carries and two touchdowns against the Tampa Bay Buccaneers. He earned NFC Offensive Player of the Week honors for his effort against the Buccaneers. On December 21, in a game against the New York Giants for the number one playoff seed, Williams rushed 24 times for 108 yards and four rushing touchdowns in a 34–28 overtime loss. He closed out the regular season with 25 carries for 178 rushing yards in a 33–31 victory over the New Orleans Saints. Williams did not fumble the entire 2008 season.

Despite having a great statistical season, he was unable to make the Pro Bowl over Clinton Portis, despite having more total yards, touchdowns, and yards per carry. This is mainly attributed to Portis outperforming Williams the first half of the season, as well as the large Redskins fanbase. However, Williams did make the All-Pro team. He started all 16 games and finished the season with 273 carries for 1,515 rushing yards and 18 rushing touchdowns, to go along with 22 catches for 121 receiving yards and two receiving touchdowns. Williams credited much of his 2008 success to a discussion with Vinny Testaverde and improved pre-game preparation. After the season, Williams was voted Pro Football Weekly and the Professional Football Writers of America's Most Improved Player of the Year.

The Panthers finished with a 12–4 record, won the NFC South, and earned a first-round bye with the #2-seed. Williams made his playoff debut against the Arizona Cardinals in the Divisional Round. He had 12 carries for 63 rushing yards in the 33–13 loss.

==== 2009 season ====
Williams started the 2009 season averaging 55 yards per game in the first four games. He found the endzone twice in that stretch. In Week 6, he had 30 carries for 152 rushing yards and two rushing touchdowns in a 28–21 victory over the Tampa Bay Buccaneers. In Week 7, Williams recorded a 77-yard run against the Arizona Cardinals for the longest rushing play in franchise history, breaking his own mark set in 2007. Williams would hold this mark until Christian McCaffrey recorded an 84-yard run in 2019. In the game, Williams totaled 23 carries for 158 rushing yards in the 34–21 victory. He followed that up with 21 carries for 149 rushing yards and two rushing touchdowns in a 30–20 loss to the New Orleans Saints. Despite missing all of three games and most of two more due to injury, Williams managed to rush for 1,117 yards and seven rushing touchdowns on 216 carries, as well as receiving for 252 yards on 29 catches, earning himself a spot in the Pro Bowl. He and Jonathan Stewart became the first running back duo since the 1970 merger to rush for 1,110 yards apiece (with Stewart rushing for 1,133 yards), as well as becoming the first running back in franchise history to rush for 1,000 in consecutive seasons.

During the 2010 Pro Bowl, Williams scored a touchdown on a seven-yard run, the first by a Panthers player in team history. He finished the game with two carries for six yards and a touchdown, as well as a 15-yard reception.

==== 2010 season ====
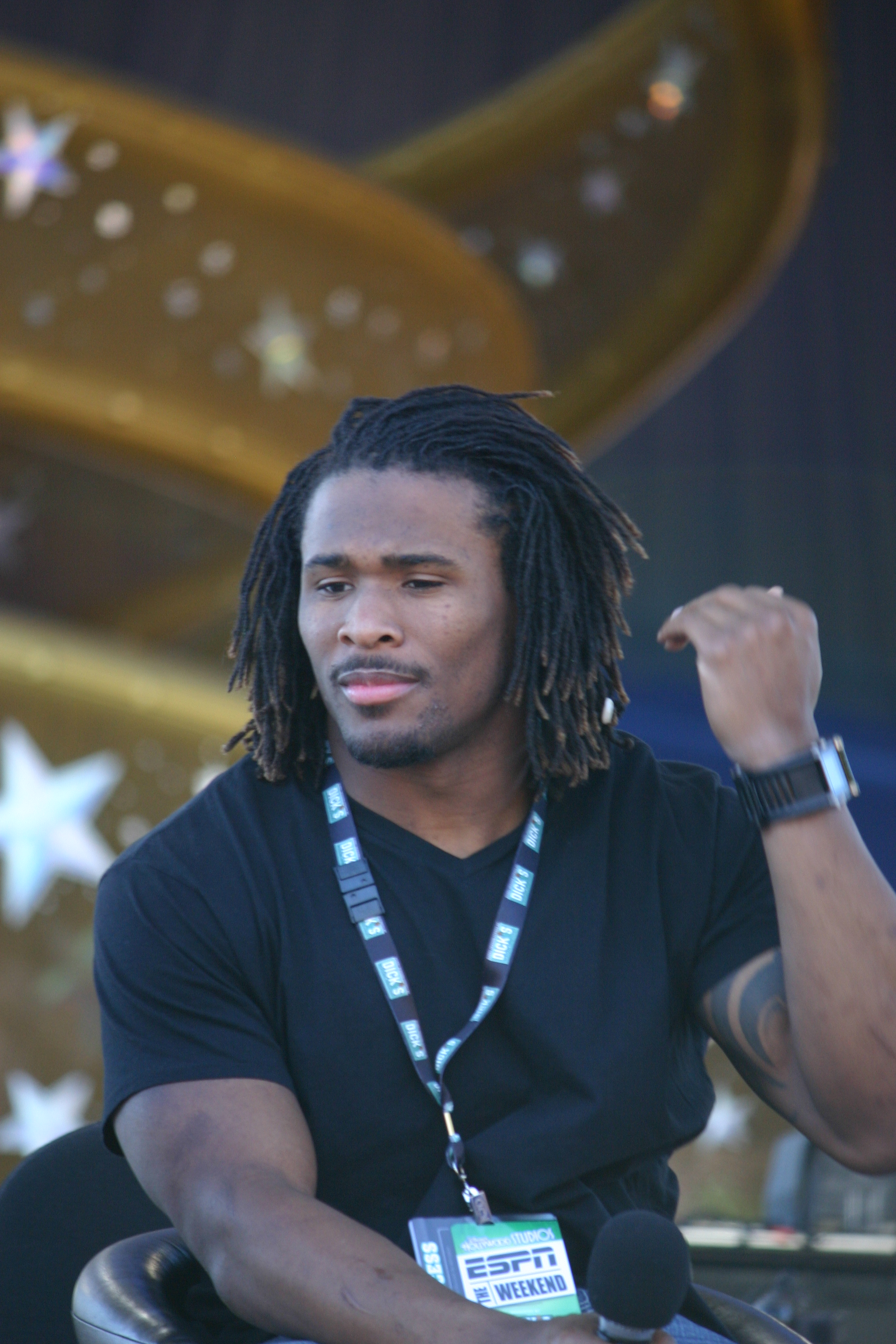
Williams at ESPN The Weekend in February 2010.

On October 24, 2010, Williams injured his right foot during the Panthers' home win against the San Francisco 49ers in Week 7. He did not play again before being placed on injured reserve on November 17, 2010, with what was announced to be a mid-foot sprain. Williams finished the year with 361 rushing yards and one rushing touchdown on 87 rushes to go along with 11 receptions for 61 receiving yards. On July 27, 2011, Williams signed a five-year, $43 million contract extension to stay with the Panthers.

==== 2011 season ====
In 2011, the Panthers drafted Cam Newton as their starting quarterback. This resulted in a three-way split for carries between Williams, Stewart, and Newton. Williams helped the trio finish third in the league in total rushing yards with 2,408. The Panthers finished first in average yards per carry and first in total touchdowns with 26. Williams finished the season with 155 carries for 836 rushing yards and seven rushing touchdowns to go along with 16 receptions for 135 receiving yards.

==== 2012 season ====
In 2012, the Panthers signed former San Diego Chargers fullback Mike Tolbert. The signing meant that Williams's carries would be split further with Stewart, Newton, and Tolbert. In Week 17, against the New Orleans Saints, he rushed 21 times for a career-high 210 rushing yards and two rushing touchdowns in the 44–38 victory. Although he played every game of the season, he only started 10 of the games. He recorded 737 yards on 173 attempts. He scored five rushing touchdowns and two receiving touchdowns.

==== 2013 season ====
In Week 3 against the New York Giants, Williams had 23 carries for 120 rushing yards in the 38–0 victory. In Week 15 against the New York Jets, he had 168 scrimmage yards and a receiving touchdown in the 30–20 victory. In the 2013 season, Williams had 201 carries, his most attempts since his Pro Bowl season in 2009. However, he did not make much out of these carries, only rushing for 843 yards. He scored three rushing touchdowns, his fewest since his injury plagued season in 2010, and one receiving touchdown. The Panthers finished with a 12–4 record, won the NFC South, and earned a first-round bye with the #2-seed. In the Divisional Round against the San Francisco 49ers, he had five carries for 13 yards in the 23–10 loss.

==== 2014 season ====
Williams rushed for 72 yards on 12 attempts in the season-opening 20–14 victory over the Tampa Bay Buccaneers. He missed the second and third games of the season against the Detroit Lions and the Pittsburgh Steelers respectively, because of a hamstring injury that he suffered during a practice in between the first two games of the season. In a Week 4 loss versus the Baltimore Ravens, Williams suffered a high ankle sprain and was taken out of the game. His cast was removed on October 6, 2014. Coach Ron Rivera has said that Williams would be able to return for Week 9 against the New Orleans Saints. In a Week 13 loss to the Minnesota Vikings, Williams fractured his right middle finger. He was listed as day to day. He missed a Week 14 victory over the New Orleans Saints due to his hand injury. He was listed as doubtful for Week 15 against Tampa Bay. After missing the final two games of the season versus the Cleveland Browns and the Atlanta Falcons respectively, Williams returned for the Wild Card Round versus the Arizona Cardinals. He saw very limited action, only carrying the ball four times for 16 yards in a 27–16 victory. In the Divisional Round against the Seattle Seahawks, Williams carried the ball two times for 14 yards in a 31–17 loss. Due to numerous injuries, Williams only appeared in six games in the 2014 regular season. He totaled 62 carries for 219 rushing yards. He was held without a touchdown for the first time in his professional career. He was released on March 10, 2015.

==== Panthers franchise records ====
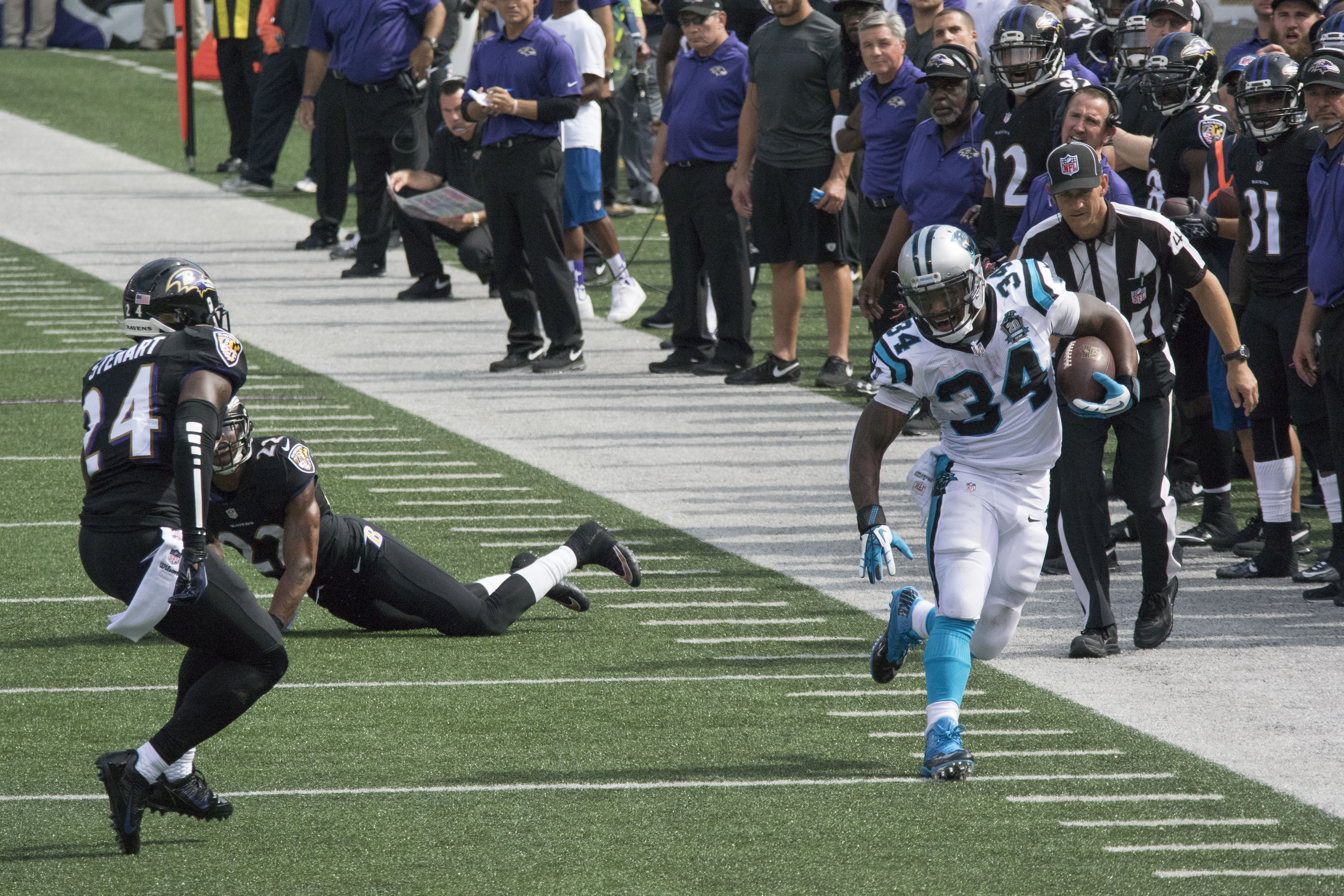
Williams (#34) in 2014

As of 2017 NFL off-season:

- Most 50+ yard rushes, career: 11
- Most rushing yards, season: 1,515 (2008)
- Most rushing touchdowns, season: 18 (2008)
- Most total touchdowns, season: 20 (2008)
- Most rushing touchdowns, game: 4 (December 21, 2008, against the New York Giants)
- Most total touchdowns, game: 4 (November 30, 2008, against the Green Bay Packers and December 21, 2008, against the New York Giants)
- Most rushing yards, game: 210 (December 30, 2012, against the New Orleans Saints)
- Most 100+ yard rushing games, career: 18
- Most 100+ yard rushing games, season: 8 (2008; with Stephen Davis)
- Most games with 2+ touchdowns, career: 11 (with Steve Smith)
- Most games with 2+ touchdowns, season: 5 (2008; with Muhsin Muhammad and Steve Smith)
- Most games with 3+ touchdowns, career: 3 (with Steve Smith)
- Most games with 3+ touchdowns, season: 3 (2008)
- Most games with 4+ touchdowns, career: 2
- Most games with 4+ touchdowns, season: 2 (2008)
- Most seasons with 1,000+ rushing yards: 2
- Most points scored in a season by a running back: 122 (2008)

=== Pittsburgh Steelers ===
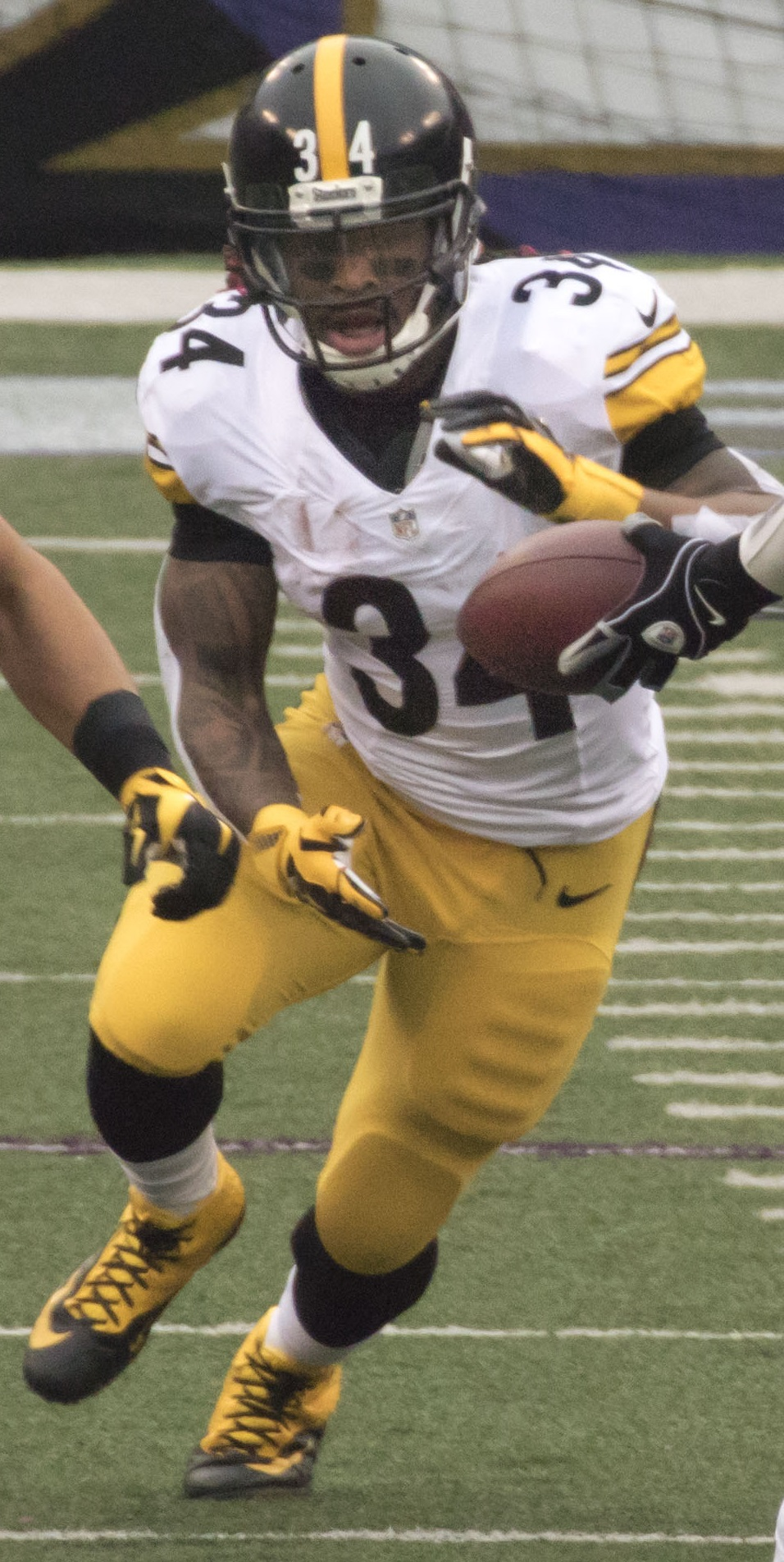
Williams in 2015

==== 2015 season ====
On March 13, 2015, Williams signed a two-year contract with the Pittsburgh Steelers. The contract was for two years and $4 million with $1.13 million guaranteed and a signing bonus of $1.13 million.

Williams made his first career start as a Steeler on September 10 in the NFL season opener against the New England Patriots. In his debut, he ran for 127 yards on 21 carries, his most in a game since 2012. In Week 2, against the San Francisco 49ers, Williams scored three touchdowns on 20 carries for 77 yards in the 43–18 victory. Despite his success in the first two weeks of the season, Williams was used as a backup once All-Pro starter Le'Veon Bell returned from his two-game suspension. In Bell's first game back, Williams received only one carry for two yards in a Week 3 12–6 victory over the St. Louis Rams. In Week 4, against the Baltimore Ravens, Williams had only two rushing attempts for five yards in the 23–20 loss. On October 28, Williams was fined $5,787 for wearing eye black that read "Find the Cure" in honor of breast cancer awareness. During a Week 8 loss to the Cincinnati Bengals, Williams rushed for 71 yards on nine carries and came in the game for Le'Veon Bell, who left with an injury. It was reported that Bell had sustained a torn MCL and would miss the rest of the season, effectively making Williams the starting running back.

In his first start since Week 2, Williams had a season-high 27 carries for 170 yards and scored two touchdowns, while accounting for 55 receiving yards on two receptions in a Week 9 victory over the Oakland Raiders. On December 13, 2015, he had 23 rushes for 76 yards and two rushing touchdowns in a win over the Cincinnati Bengals.

Already without Bell, in Week 17 on the road against the Cleveland Browns, Williams suffered an ankle injury and did not return. This injury kept him out of the Steelers' 18–16 Wild Card Round victory over Cincinnati and the following week against the eventual Super Bowl champion Denver Broncos in the Divisional Round. Williams finished the 2015 regular season with 200 carries for 907 rushing yards and tied with Devonta Freeman, Jeremy Hill, and Adrian Peterson for the league-lead with 11 rushing touchdowns. At the age of 32, he became the oldest player to at least hold a share of the NFL rushing touchdown single-season mark since Marcus Allen in 1993.

==== 2016 season ====
Williams was again called upon to serve as the Steelers lead running back after another Le'Veon Bell suspension, this time for the first three games of the season. After two weeks in the 2016 season, he was the league leader in rushing yards after rushing for 146 yards against the Washington Redskins in the season opener and 94 yards on a career-high 32 carries against the Cincinnati Bengals in the next game. For his Week 1 performance, he earned AFC Offensive Player of the Week. His production dipped later on the season and he finished with 343 rushing yards and four rushing touchdowns. The Steelers made the playoffs and advanced to the AFC Championship. In the 36–17 loss to the New England Patriots, he had 14 carries for 34 rushing yards and a rushing touchdown to go along with seven receptions for 51 yards. In addition, he had a successful two-point conversion in what was his final professional game.

=== Retirement ===
On June 25, 2018, Williams announced on Facebook that he had retired from the NFL.

== Career statistics ==
Legend
| | Led the league |
| **Bold** | Career high |

=== NFL ===
==== Regular season ====
| Year | Team | Games | | Rushing | | | | | Receiving | | | | | Kickoff returns | | | | | Fumbles | |
| Year | Team | GP | GS | Att | Yds | Avg | Lng | TD | Rec | Yds | Avg | Lng | TD | Ret | Yds | Avg | Lng | TD | Fum | Lost |
|---|---|---|---|---|---|---|---|---|---|---|---|---|---|---|---|---|---|---|---|---|
| 2006 | CAR | 13 | 2 | 121 | 501 | 4.1 | 31 | 1 | 33 | 313 | 9.5 | 41 | 1 | **32** | **623** | **19.5** | **39** | 0 | 1 | 0 |
| 2007 | CAR | 16 | 0 | 144 | 717 | 5.0 | 75 | 4 | 23 | 175 | 7.6 | 30 | 1 | 13 | 231 | 17.8 | 29 | 0 | 1 | 1 |
| 2008 | CAR | 16 | 16 | **273** | **1,515** | **5.5** | 69 | **18** | 22 | 121 | 5.5 | 25 | **2** | — | — | — | — | — | 0 | 0 |
| 2009 | CAR | 13 | 13 | 216 | 1,117 | 5.2 | **77** | 7 | 29 | 252 | 8.7 | 30 | 0 | — | — | — | — | — | 3 | **3** |
| 2010 | CAR | 6 | 6 | 87 | 361 | 4.1 | 39 | 1 | 11 | 61 | 5.5 | 14 | 0 | — | — | — | — | — | 1 | 1 |
| 2011 | CAR | 16 | 14 | 155 | 836 | 5.4 | 74 | 7 | 16 | 135 | 8.4 | 32 | 0 | — | — | — | — | — | 0 | 0 |
| 2012 | CAR | 16 | 10 | 173 | 737 | 4.3 | 65 | 5 | 13 | 187 | **14.4** | 53 | **2** | — | — | — | — | — | 2 | 2 |
| 2013 | CAR | 15 | 15 | 201 | 843 | 4.2 | 43 | 3 | 26 | 333 | 12.8 | **72** | 1 | — | — | — | — | — | 3 | 2 |
| 2014 | CAR | 6 | 6 | 62 | 219 | 3.5 | 17 | 0 | 5 | 44 | 8.8 | 30 | 0 | — | — | — | — | — | 1 | 1 |
| 2015 | PIT | 16 | 10 | 200 | 907 | 4.5 | 55 | 11 | **40** | **367** | 9.2 | 34 | 0 | — | — | — | — | — | **4** | 2 |
| 2016 | PIT | 9 | 4 | 98 | 343 | 3.5 | 17 | 4 | 18 | 118 | 6.6 | 20 | **2** | — | — | — | — | — | 0 | 0 |
| Career | | 142 | 96 | 1,730 | 8,096 | 4.7 | 77 | 61 | 236 | 2,106 | 8.9 | 72 | 9 | 45 | 854 | 19.0 | 39 | 0 | 16 | 12 |

==== Postseason ====
| Year | Team | Games | | Rushing | | | | | Receiving | | | | | Fumbles | |
| Year | Team | GP | GS | Att | Yds | Avg | Lng | TD | Rec | Yds | Avg | Lng | TD | Fum | Lost |
|---|---|---|---|---|---|---|---|---|---|---|---|---|---|---|---|
| 2008 | CAR | 1 | 1 | 12 | **63** | **5.3** | **31** | 0 | 1 | 6 | 6.0 | 6 | 0 | 0 | 0 |
| 2013 | CAR | 1 | 1 | 5 | 13 | 2.6 | 7 | 0 | 0 | 0 | 0.0 | 0 | 0 | 0 | 0 |
| 2014 | CAR | 2 | 0 | 6 | 30 | 5.0 | 12 | 0 | 2 | 2 | 1.0 | 2 | 0 | 0 | 0 |
| 2015 | PIT | 0 | 0 | Did not play due to injury | | | | | | | | | | | |
| 2016 | PIT | 3 | 0 | **16** | 36 | 2.3 | 15 | **1** | **7** | **51** | **7.3** | **10** | 0 | 0 | 0 |
| Career | | 7 | 2 | 39 | 142 | 3.6 | 31 | 1 | 10 | 59 | 5.9 | 10 | 0 | 0 | 0 |

=== College ===
Legend
| Led the NCAA |

| Season | Team | GP | Rushing | | | | | | Receiving | | | |
| Season | Team | GP | Att | Yds | Avg | Y/G | Lng | TD | Rec | Yds | Lng | TD |
|---|---|---|---|---|---|---|---|---|---|---|---|---|
| 2002 | Memphis | 10 | 103 | 684 | **6.6** | 68.4 | 31 | 5 | 5 | 51 | 32 | 0 |
| 2003 | Memphis | 11 | 243 | 1,430 | 5.9 | 130.0 | 49 | 10 | **35** | **384** | **80** | **3** |
| 2004 | Memphis | 12 | **313** | 1,948 | 6.2 | 162.3 | 75 | **22** | 18 | 210 | 68 | 1 |
| 2005 | Memphis | 11 | 310 | **1,964** | 6.3 | **178.5** | **76** | 18 | 12 | 78 | 29 | 1 |
| Career | | 44 | 969 | 6,026 | 6.2 | 137.0 | 86 | 55 | 70 | 723 | 80 | 5 |

== Professional wrestling career ==
Williams appeared on the April 2, 2017, episode of Impact Wrestling, alongside former NFL tight end Gary Barnidge, to save Moose from an attack. A week later, Williams announced he would make his debut as a professional wrestler at an upcoming pay-per-view event. Williams stated "I'm a huge, huge, huge fan of professional wrestling, and everything I'm going to do in the ring will be for the wrestlers who I have watched in the past, as well as those I still watch today. I respect the sport, the wrestlers and everything that comes with it." in a press release hyping his appearance.

Accompanied by Barnidge and Austin Dillon, Williams made his debut at Slammiversary XV on July 2, 2017, as a face, teaming with Moose (himself a former NFL player) in a victory over Chris Adonis and Eli Drake. His performance in the match received rave reviews from critics, including journalist Dave Meltzer, who stated that Williams "has the potential to be one of the greatest wrestlers I've ever seen", and compared him to other athletes turned professional wrestlers such as Matt Riddle, Jun Akiyama, and Kurt Angle. Bryan Alvarez stated that Williams was "pretty damn amazing in his first-ever match". Meltzer later stated that Williams had the best in-ring performance by a celebrity in wrestling history.

Williams announced his retirement from wrestling on July 5, 2017.

On July 2, 2018, Williams announced he would return to wrestling and wrestle again for Impact. Williams began a storyline with Austin Aries, but did not appear since after one episode.

On January 13, 2024, Williams returned to TNA at TNA Hard to Kill on the "Countdown to Hard to Kill" pre-show. Williams appeared alongside Eddie Edwards, Brian Myers, Alisha Edwards, and Moose, subsequently forming a stable called The System, thus establishing Williams as a heel. They later accompanied Moose to his main event match for the TNA World Championship against Alex Shelley. During the match, Williams and the rest of The System attempted to distract Shelley, prompting a brawl with Shelley's partners, Chris Sabin and Kushida. Moose later won the match.

== Personal life ==
Williams was born on April 25, 1983, to his mother Sandra Hill. His mother was diagnosed with breast cancer in 2004. After 10 years battling the illness, she died in May 2014. All four of his maternal aunts have also died from breast cancer. With help from the NFL, Williams is credited for starting the NFL's breast cancer awareness and wearing pink initiative. He now works with Susan G. Komen and has pink highlights in his dreadlocks to support the fight against breast cancer. In October 2019, Williams sponsored 500 mammograms to honor his mother.

Williams competed on the 32nd season of The Amazing Race with fellow former football player Gary Barnidge and finished in fourth place.

On May 30, 2026, Williams became an Ultramarathoner, completing seven loops (29 miles) in the Momentus Backyard Ultra.

== See also ==
- List of Carolina Panthers first-round draft picks
- List of Carolina Panthers records and statistics
- List of National Football League annual rushing touchdowns leaders
- List of NCAA Division I FBS career rushing touchdowns leaders
- List of college football yearly rushing leaders
