= Roddy White =

American football player (born 1981)

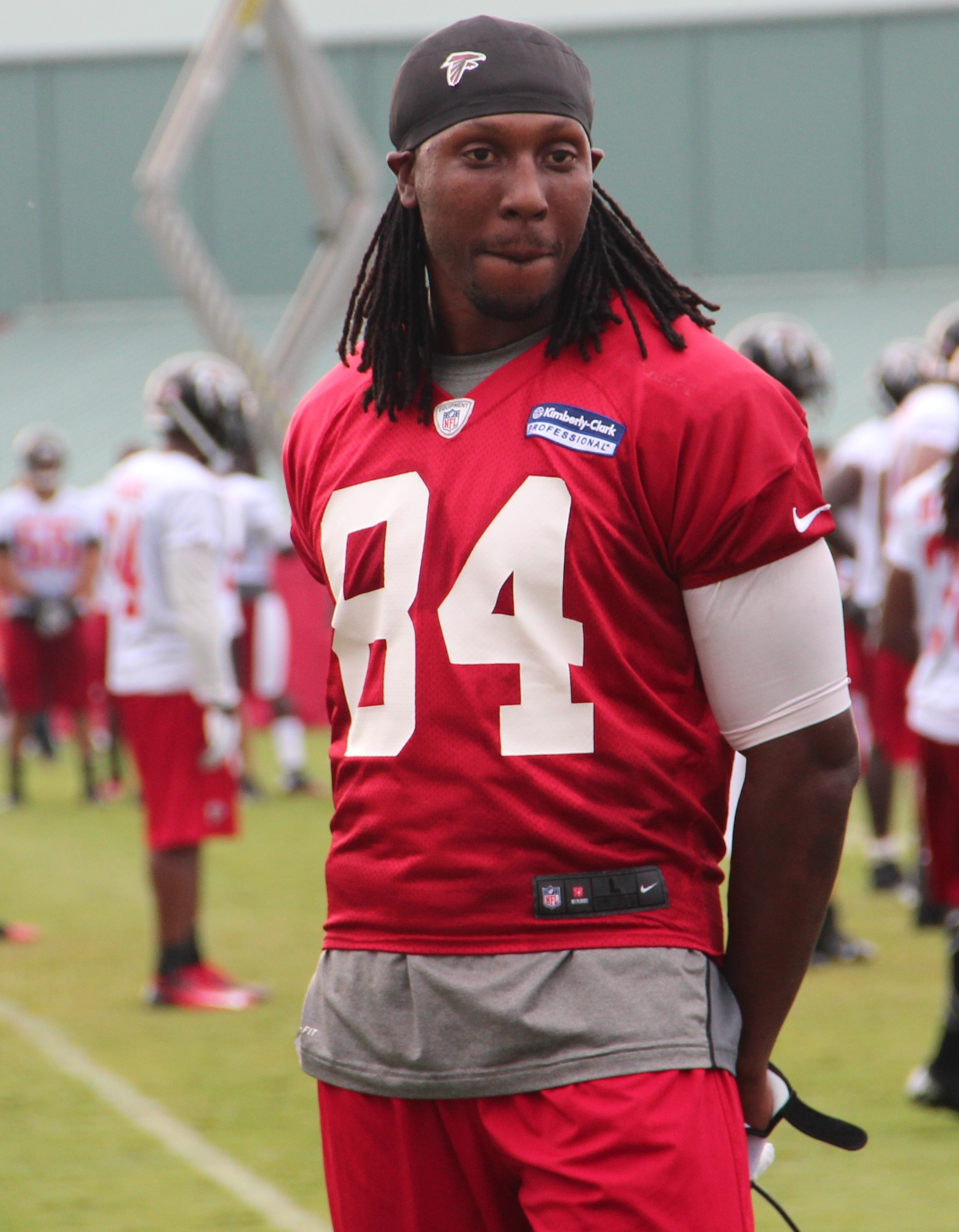
- White with the Atlanta Falcons in 2013

No. 84
- Position: Wide receiver

Personal information
- Born: November 2, 1981 (age 45); Charleston, South Carolina, U.S.
- Listed height: 6 ft 0 in (1.83 m)
- Listed weight: 211 lb (96 kg)

Career information
- High school: James Island (SC)
- College: UAB (2001–2004)
- NFL draft: 2005: 1st round, 27th overall pick

Career history
- Atlanta Falcons (2005–2015)

Awards and highlights
- First-team All-Pro (2010); 4× Pro Bowl (2008–2011); NFL receptions leader (2010); Atlanta Falcons Ring of Honor; Third-team All-American (2004); NCAA receiving yards leader (2004)

Career NFL statistics
- Receptions: 808
- Receiving yards: 10,863
- Receiving touchdowns: 63
- Stats at Pro Football Reference

Sharod Lamor "Roddy" White (born November 2, 1981) is an American former professional football player who spent his entire career as a wide receiver with the Atlanta Falcons of the National Football League (NFL). He played college football for the UAB Blazers, and was selected by the Falcons in the first round of the 2005 NFL draft.

== Early life ==
White attended James Island High School in Charleston, South Carolina, and was a four-sport letterman and standout in football, baseball, soccer, and wrestling. In football, he was a two-time All-Lowcountry honoree, a two-time All-State honoree, and was also listed as one of the top receivers in the nation on Rivals.com. In wrestling, he was a two-time South Carolina state champion, often pinning his opponent in a move that was coined the "Shanaz".

== College career ==
White attended the University of Alabama at Birmingham, where he was a standout wide receiver for the UAB Blazers football team. He caught 163 passes for 3,112 yards and 26 touchdowns in four seasons. He played under head coach Watson Brown while at UAB. White was inducted into the UAB Athletics Hall of Fame in 2017.

=== 2001 season ===
As a freshman, White recorded meaningful statistics in six games. On October 13, against the Cincinnati Bearcats, he recorded his first collegiate touchdown. On December 12, against the Pitt Panthers, he had a season-high four receptions for 75 yards. Overall, in his freshman season, he recorded 14 receptions for 236 yards and two touchdowns.

=== 2002 season ===
As a sophomore, White saw an expanded role in the Blazers offense. On October 12, against the Houston Cougars, he recorded four receptions for 94 yards and a touchdown. In the next game against the Tulane Green Wave, he recorded five receptions for 66 yards and another touchdown. On November 16, he had a career-day against the East Carolina Pirates with eight receptions for 159 yards and a touchdown. Overall, in his sophomore season, he recorded 39 receptions for 580 yards and three touchdowns.

=== 2003 season ===
As a junior, White continued his productive college career with the Blazers. On September 4, against the Southern Miss Golden Eagles, he recorded 10 receptions for 111 yards. On October 11, against the Cincinnati Bearcats, he had a breakout day with four receptions for 171 yards and two touchdowns. In the last three games of the season, he posted great results: 147 yards and two touchdowns against the Tulane Green Wave, 121 yards and a touchdown against the South Florida Bulls, and 54 yards and a touchdown against the Houston Cougars. Overall, in his junior season, he recorded 39 receptions for 844 yards and seven touchdowns.

=== 2004 season ===
As a senior, White had his best collegiate season statistically. On September 25, against the Memphis Tigers, he had eight receptions for 177 yards and three touchdowns. On October 9, against the Mississippi State Bulldogs, he had seven receptions for 123 yards and two touchdowns. He had career day against the Tulane Green Wave on October 23, with 10 receptions for 253 yards and a touchdown, and it was his fifth straight game with a touchdown score. On November 13, against the Houston Cougars, he had eight receptions for 153 yards and two touchdowns. On November 27, against the Southern Miss Golden Eagles, he had four receptions for 132 yards and a touchdown. White helped lead UAB to their first bowl game in school history. In the 2004 Hawaii Bowl, White caught six passes for 113 yards and a touchdown in the 59–40 loss to the Hawaii Warriors. He finished his senior season with 14 touchdowns on 71 receptions for an NCAA-leading 1,452 yards.

== Professional career ==
Pre-draft measurables
Height	Weight	Arm length	Hand span	40-yard dash	20-yard shuttle	Three-cone drill	Vertical jump	Broad jump	Bench press
6 ft 1 1/4 in (1.86 m)	207 lb (94 kg)	31 5/8 in (0.80 m)	9 5/8 in (0.24 m)	4.45 s	4.01 s	7.12 s	41.0 in (1.04 m)	10 ft 6 in (3.20 m)	18 reps
Measurables were taken from the NFL Combine.

=== Atlanta Falcons ===
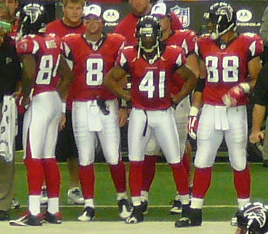
White with Chris Redman, Antoine Harris, and Tony Gonzalez in 2009.

==== 2005 season ====
White was drafted by the Atlanta Falcons in the first round of the 2005 NFL draft with the 27th overall pick. He was the sixth wide receiver to be selected that year.

Although a high ankle sprain caused him to remain on the sidelines for much of the preseason, he recovered by Week 2 and was put on the team's roster. In Week 4 against the Minnesota Vikings, he was inserted in the lineup as the No. 3 receiver. During the course of the game, he recorded 64 yards on 5 catches. However, during the rest of the season, his performance was generally spotty. He made a fantastic leaping catch over three defenders on a trick play against the New Orleans Saints during Week 14 for a 54-yard touchdown, but dropped a crucial touchdown catch the next week against the Tampa Bay Buccaneers. In spite of this, he still had 108 yards receiving in that game, the second-highest receiving total put up by a rookie wide receiver in 2005, only surpassed by Jacksonville Jaguars receiver Matt Jones (117 yards vs. the Baltimore Ravens). White ranked fifth among all rookie wide receivers in 2005 with 446 receiving yards.

==== 2006 season ====
In the 2006 season, White appeared in all 16 games and started five. He had his best game of the season against the Dallas Cowboys where he had three receptions for 104 yards. His performance in his second season increased in comparison to his rookie season. He recorded 30 receptions for 505 yards in his second season.

==== 2007 season ====
On September 23, against the Carolina Panthers, White had seven receptions for 127 yards and a touchdown. A few weeks later, against the New Orleans Saints, he had eight receptions for 110 yards and a touchdown. On November 22, against the Indianapolis Colts, he had six receptions for 104 yards and a touchdown. In the next game, against the St. Louis Rams, he had 10 receptions for a season-high 146 yards and a touchdown. In the penultimate game of his third season, he had 12 receptions for 141 yards against the Arizona Cardinals.

In a game against the New Orleans Saints, White showed his support for fellow Falcon Michael Vick by wearing a T-shirt that said "Free Mike Vick" and pulling up his jersey after scoring a touchdown. Earlier that day, Vick was sentenced to 23 months in jail on dogfighting charges. White was fined $10,000 by the league for his actions.

White became the first Falcon wide receiver since Terance Mathis in 1999 to reach 1,000 single-season receiving yards on December 23, 2007, against the Arizona Cardinals. He also finished tied for eighth among all NFL wide receivers in receiving yards in 2007 with 1,202 yards. He had six receiving touchdowns.

==== 2008 season ====
On September 21, 2008, in Week 3, he put together his first solid performance of the season with five receptions for 119 yards and a touchdown against the Kansas City Chiefs. On October 5, he had eight receptions for 132 yards and a touchdown in Week 5 against the Green Bay Packers. He followed that up the next week, he had nine receptions for 112 yards and a touchdown against the Chicago Bears. The next week, he had eight receptions for 113 yards and two touchdowns against the Philadelphia Eagles. On November 16, in Week 11, he had five receptions for 102 yards against the Denver Broncos. Two weeks later, on November 30, he had another great game with six receptions for 112 yards against the San Diego Chargers. On December 7, in Week 14, he had with best performance of the season with 10 receptions for 164 yards against the New Orleans Saints. On December 28, in the regular season finale, he had three receptions for 48 yards and a touchdown against the St. Louis Rams in the Week 17 finale.

White and the Falcons made the playoffs in the 2008 season and met the Arizona Cardinals in the Wild Card Round. The Falcons fell by a score of 30–24 as White had 11 receptions for 84 yards and a touchdown.

White's 2008 season was an improvement over the previous year, finishing fourth in the NFL in receiving yards. He finished the year with 1,382 receiving yards (career high and team record), 88 receptions (career high), and seven touchdowns (career high). He broke Alfred Jenkins's team record of 1,358 receiving yards, which stood since 1981.

On December 16, 2008, White was named to the 2009 Pro Bowl, the first of his career, along with fellow Falcons running back Michael Turner.

==== 2009 season ====
On July 31, 2009, White began a holdout, boycotting the 2009 training camp in an attempt at an early contract extension. On August 8, he signed a six-year, $48 million contract extension with $18.6 million guaranteed and $28 million over the first three years of the deal. The extension made him the fifth highest paid wide receiver in the league, behind Arizona's Larry Fitzgerald, Carolina's Steve Smith, Chicago's Brandon Marshall, and Houston's Andre Johnson.

In Week 2, on September 20, he had six receptions for 53 yards and his first touchdown of the season against the Carolina Panthers. On October 11, White set the Falcons franchise record for single-game receiving yards in a game against the San Francisco 49ers. He had eight receptions for a career-high 210 yards as well as two touchdowns, one of which was for 90 yards. This record has been broken by Julio Jones, who recorded 300 yards against the Carolina Panthers in a game during the 2016–2017 season. On November 2, in Week 8, he broke 100 receiving yards again with four receptions for 108 yards and a touchdown against the New Orleans Saints. Over a month later, on December 6, he had nine receptions for 104 yards and a touchdown against the Philadelphia Eagles in Week 13. The next week, he had eight receptions for 139 yards and two touchdowns against the Buffalo Bills. He closed out the regular season on January 3, 2010, with six receptions for 66 yards and a touchdown against the Tampa Bay Buccaneers.

White finished the 2009 season with 85 receptions, 1,153 yards, and a career-high 11 touchdowns. He became only the second Falcon player to record three straight 1,000 yard seasons. On January 26, 2010, White was selected to his second consecutive Pro Bowl.

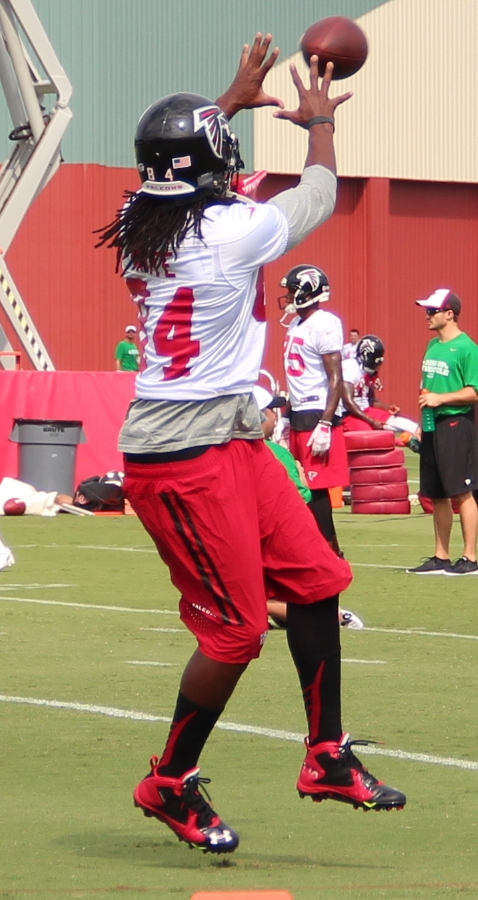
Roddy White at Falcons training camp in 2015

==== 2010 season ====
In the 2010 regular season opener, White had a career-high 13 receptions for 111 yards against the Pittsburgh Steelers. Two games later, he had five receptions for 69 yards and his first touchdown of the season against the New Orleans Saints. The next week, he had seven receptions for 104 yards against the San Francisco 49ers. For the third straight week, he put up a solid performance with five receptions for 101 yards and a touchdown against the Cleveland Browns. On October 24, he had 11 receptions for 201 yards and two touchdowns against the Cincinnati Bengals. His performance against the Bengals was his second-career game with at least 200 receiving yards. He earned NFC Offensive Player of the Week honors for his game against Cincinnati. On November 11, in Week 10, he had 12 receptions for 138 yards and two touchdowns against the Baltimore Ravens. White earned First team All-Pro honors and a Pro Bowl nomination for the 2010 season.

White and the Falcons made the playoffs in the 2010 season. In the Divisional Round, they fell to the Green Bay Packers 48–21 with White having six receptions for 57 yards and a touchdown.

In 2010, White led the NFL in receptions with 115 and the NFC in receiving yards with 1,389. He also had 10 touchdowns for the year. He was ranked 24th by his fellow players on the NFL Top 100 Players of 2011.

==== 2011 season ====
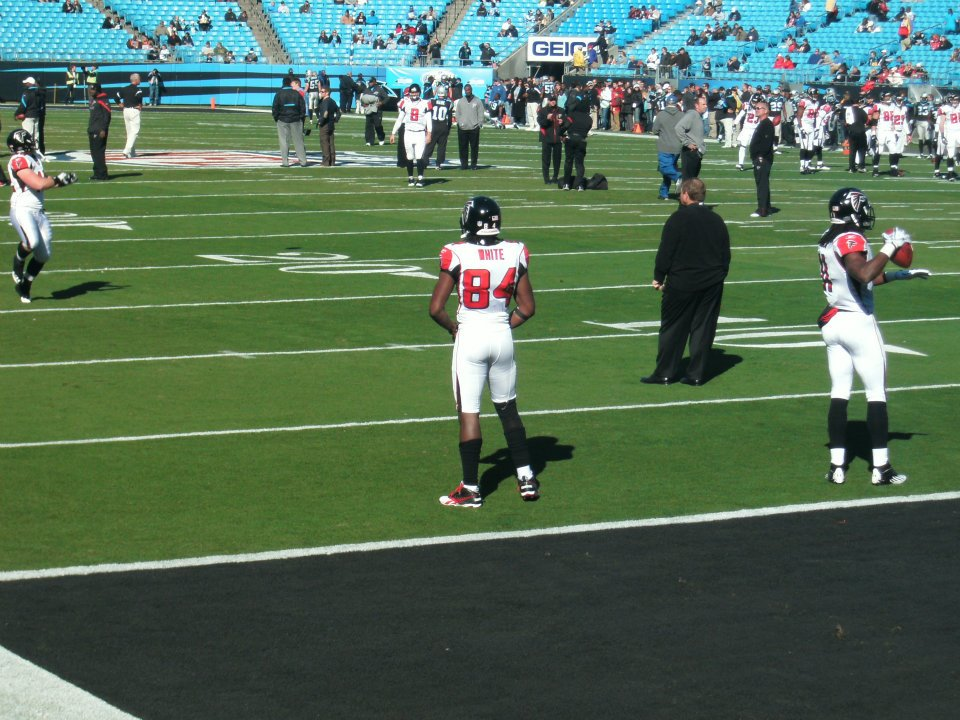
Roddy White during the 2011 season

White started off the 2011 season with eight receptions for 61 yards against the Chicago Bears on September 11. The next week, he had a quiet day with three receptions for 23 yards but had his first touchdown of the season against the Philadelphia Eagles. On September 25, in Week 3, he had nine receptions for 140 against the Tampa Bay Buccaneers. A few weeks later, in Week 11, on November 20, he had seven receptions for 147 yards against the Tennessee Titans. The next week, he had another great day with had 10 receptions for 120 yards and a touchdown against the Minnesota Vikings. The Vikings game started a stretch for White with four straight games with a touchdown. On December 15, 2011, he had 10 receptions for 135 yards and two touchdowns against the Jacksonville Jaguars in Week 15. On December 26, he had 11 receptions for 127 yards and against the New Orleans Saints. He closed out the 2011 regular season with 69 yards against the Tampa Bay Buccaneers on New Year's Day.

In the 2011 season, White started in all 16 games. He recorded 100 receptions for 1,296 yards and eight touchdowns.

White had five receptions for 52 yards in the 24–2 loss to the New York Giants in the Wild Card Round. On January 11, 2012, White was added to the NFC Pro Bowl Roster replacing Detroit Lions wide receiver Calvin Johnson due to a sore Achilles tendon.

In 2011, White broke the franchise record for receptions, passing Terence Mathis's mark of 573. He was ranked 65th by his fellow players on the NFL Top 100 Players of 2012.

==== 2012 season ====
In the 2012 season, White appeared in all 16 games and started 15.

On September 9, 2012, in the season opener, he had six receptions for 87 yards against the Kansas City Chiefs. The next week, he had eight receptions for 102 yards and his first touchdown of the season against the Denver Broncos. On September 30, he had eight receptions for 169 yards and two touchdowns against the Carolina Panthers. On November 4, he had the first of three straight weeks with 100+ receiving yards with seven receptions for 118 yards against the Dallas Cowboys. On November 11, he had seven receptions for 114 yards against the New Orleans Saints. On November 18, he continued the streak with eight receptions for 123 yards and against the Arizona Cardinals. He picked it back up in Week 14, with nine receptions for 117 yards and a touchdown against the Carolina Panthers. On December 22, in Week 15, he had eight receptions for 153 yards and two touchdowns against the Detroit Lions. He closed out his 2012 regular season on December 30 with had five receptions for 42 yards against the Tampa Bay Buccaneers.

White and the Falcons made the playoffs in the 2012 season. In the Divisional Round against the Seattle Seahawks, he had five receptions for 76 yards and a touchdown as the Falcons won 30–28. In the NFC Championship against the San Francisco 49ers, he had seven receptions for 100 yards as the Falcons fell 28–24.

Overall, he recorded 92 receptions for 1,351 yards and seven touchdowns. He was ranked 39th by his fellow players on the NFL Top 100 Players of 2013.

==== 2013 season ====
During the 2013 season, White was dealing with an ankle injury and a hamstring injury, which caused him to get off to a very slow start. Over the first five games of the season, he only recorded 14 receptions for 129 yards combined. In Week 7, White missed the first game in his nine-year NFL career ending his streak of playing in 133 straight games. On November 17, he had three receptions for 36 yards and his first touchdown of the season against the Tampa Bay Buccaneers. On December 1, in Week 13, he had with 10 receptions for a season-high 143 yards against the Buffalo Bills. On December 23, in Week 16, he had 12 receptions for 141 yards and a touchdown against the San Francisco 49ers. On December 29, he closed out the regular season with eight receptions for 91 yards and a touchdown against the Carolina Panthers as the Falcons finished with a 4–12 record. He finished the 2013 season with 63 receptions for 711 receiving yards and three receiving touchdowns.

==== 2014 season ====
On July 24, 2014, White signed a contract extension worth $30 million over four years.

In the season opener on September 7, he had five receptions for 72 yards and a touchdown against the New Orleans Saints. On October 19, in Week 7, he had nine receptions for 100 yards and a touchdown against the Baltimore Ravens. In Week 11 against the Carolina Panthers, he became the 42nd player in NFL history to reach the 10,000-receiving-yard milestone in the game. On December 28, he closed out the regular season with eight receptions for 104 yards against the Carolina Panthers as the Falcons finished with a 6–10 record. White finished the 2014 season with 80 receptions for 921 receiving yards and seven receiving touchdowns.

==== 2015 season ====
In the 2015 season, White started in all 16 games in what was his final NFL season.

Overall, White totaled 43 receptions for 506 receiving yards and one receiving touchdown. His yardage and reception totals were his fewest since his second season in the NFL in 2006.

On March 2, 2016, White was released by the Falcons.

=== Retirement ===
After not playing at all in the 2016 season, White officially announced his retirement from the NFL on April 14, 2017. On June 12, 2017, White retired as an Atlanta Falcon.

On June 24, 2017, White and Michael Vick were both honored by the Falcons with a retirement ceremony.

On June 11, 2019, the Falcons announced that White will be inducted into the Falcons Ring of Honor.

White was inducted into the Falcons Ring of Honor during the game against the Carolina Panthers on December 8, 2019.

== Career statistics ==
Legend
	Led the league
**Bold**	Career high

=== NFL ===
Year	Team	Games		Receiving					Rushing					Fumbles	
Year	Team	GP	GS	Rec	Yds	Avg	Lng	TD	Att	Yds	Avg	Lng	TD	Fum	Lost
2005	ATL	16	8	29	446	15.4	54	3	**4**	**12**	**3.0**	**16**	0	1	1
2006	ATL	16	5	30	506	**16.9**	55	0	—	—	—	—	—	1	1
2007	ATL	16	15	83	1,202	14.5	69	6	1	−2	−2.0	−2	0	**3**	**2**
2008	ATL	16	15	88	1,382	15.7	70	7	2	4	2.0	2	0	1	1
2009	ATL	16	16	85	1,153	13.6	**90**	**11**	1	2	2.0	2	0	1	0
2010	ATL	16	16	**115**	**1,389**	12.1	46	10	1	3	**3.0**	3	0	1	1
2011	ATL	16	16	100	1,296	13.0	43	8	—	—	—	—	—	1	1
2012	ATL	16	15	92	1,351	14.7	59	7	—	—	—	—	—	1	0
2013	ATL	13	13	63	711	11.3	39	3	—	—	—	—	—	2	1
2014	ATL	14	14	80	921	11.5	39	7	—	—	—	—	—	**3**	1
2015	ATL	16	16	43	506	11.8	25	1	—	—	—	—	—	1	1
Total		171	150	808	10,863	13.4	90	63	9	19	2.1	16	0	16	10

=== College ===
Legend
Led the League

Season	Team	Class	Pos	GP	Receiving			
Season	Team	Class	Pos	GP	Rec	Yds	Avg	TD
2001	UAB	FR	WR	9	14	236	16.9	2
2002	UAB	SO	WR	12	39	580	14.9	3
2003	UAB	JR	WR	12	39	844	**21.6**	7
2004	UAB	SR	WR	12	**71**	**1,452**	20.5	**14**
Career				45	163	3,112	19.1	26

== Career highlights ==
=== Awards and honors ===
NFL

- First-team All-Pro (2010)
- 4× Pro Bowl (2008–2011)
- NFL receptions leader (2010)
- Atlanta Falcons Ring of Honor
- 3× NFL Top 100 — 24th (2011), 65th (2012), 39th (2013)

College

- Third-team All-American (2004)
- NCAA receiving yards leader (2004)

=== Falcons franchise records ===
- Most receiving yards in a half (185)
- Most receptions in a playoff game (11) (tied with Julio Jones)
- Most receiving touchdowns in a career (63)
- Most career starts for a wide receiver (149)
- Most games played as a wide receiver (171)

== Personal life ==
White is the father of five children. His half-brother, Tyrone Moore Jr., was shot dead outside the Lake House Club nightclub in James Island, South Carolina on May 18, 2014. White currently coaches wide receivers at Johns Creek High School in Johns Creek, Georgia.

== Controversy ==
In 2007, White was fined $10,000 by the NFL for displaying a shirt in support of Michael Vick who was at the time serving a prison sentence for a criminal conviction related to dog fighting.

At the conclusion of the 2013 George Zimmerman trial, White was upset with the verdict of not guilty, and he posted several controversial statements on Twitter, including "Fucking Zimmerman got away with murder today wow what kind of world do we live in". He received the most backlash for the following tweet: "All them jurors should go home tonight and kill themselves for letting a grown man get away with killing a kid". After a few hours, he complained that "people on Twitter want me to get in trouble for a tweet", but he apologized the next day.

In 2014, White was criticized for reneging on a public bet he tweeted regarding a Duke win in the 2014 NCAA basketball championship. White had promised season tickets, front row at the 50-yard line. When White lost the bet, he offered a ticket to a Bears game instead. White later upheld his end of the deal and more, including two Super Bowl tickets stating, "We have talked about it for days while people were just speculating. And being a father, you have to be responsible for your actions."

== See also ==
- List of Atlanta Falcons first-round draft picks
- List of NCAA major college football yearly receiving leaders
