= 2003 Fort Worth Bowl =

2003 PlainsCapital Fort Worth Bowl
TCU Horned Frogs	Boise State Broncos
(11–1)	(12–1)
C-USA	WAC
31	34
Head coach: Gary Patterson	Head coach: Dan Hawkins
AP / Coaches / BCS; 19 / 19 / 18	AP / Coaches / BCS; 18 / 16 / 17
	1	2	3	4	Total
TCU	14	10	7	0	31
Boise State	7	17	3	7	34
- Date: December 23, 2003
- Season: 2003
- Stadium: Amon G. Carter Stadium
- Location: Fort Worth, Texas
- MVP: Ryan Dinwiddie (QB, Boise State) & Brandon Hassell (QB, TCU)
- Referee: Raymond Vaughn (MAC)
- Attendance: 38,028
- Payout: US$750,000

United States TV coverage
- Network: ESPN
- Announcers: Ron Franklin (Play-by-Play); Mike Gottfried (Analyst); Adrian Karsten (Sideline)

The 2003 Fort Worth Bowl, the inaugural edition of the game, featured the Boise State Broncos, and the TCU Horned Frogs. The title sponsor for the game was PlainsCapital Bank.

TCU scored first when running back Corey Rodgers scored on a 3-yard touchdown run, giving TCU the early 7–0 lead. Boise State responded when quarterback Ryan Dinwiddie connected with T.J. Acree for a 27-yard touchdown pass tying the game at 7. TCU reclaimed the lead at 14–7 when Brandon Hassell fired a 22-yard touchdown pass to Cory Rodgers.

In the second quarter, Brandon Hassell scored on a 21-yard touchdown run giving TCU a 21–7 lead. Ryan Dinwiddie threw a 54-yard touchdown pass to Jeff Carpenter to pull Boise State to 21–14. Running back David Mikell ran 75-yards for a touchdown, to tie the game at 21 before halftime.

In the third quarter, Nick Browne reclaimed the lead after he drilled a 32-yard field goal. Boise State responded with two field goals of their own to take a 27–24 lead into the fourth quarter. TCU running back Lonta Hobbs scored on a 7-yard touchdown run to give TCU a 31–27 lead. Ryan Dinwiddie won the game for Boise State when he fired an 18-yard touchdown pass to Derek Schouman to make the final 34–31, Boise State.
