= 2003 Army Black Knights football team =

American college football season

2003 Army Black Knights football
- Conference: Conference USA
- Record: 0–13 (0–8 C-USA)
- Head coach: Todd Berry (4th season; first 6 games); John Mumford (interim; final 7 games)
- Offensive coordinator: John Bond (4th season)
- Offensive scheme: Spread/option
- Defensive coordinator: Dennis Therrell (4th season)
- Base defense: 4–4
- Captains: Bryan Bowdish; Clint Dodson; Derrick Goodwin; Zac Hurst
- Home stadium: Michie Stadium

2003 Conference USA football standings
	Conf.			Overall
Team	W		L	W		L
Southern Miss $	8	–	0	9	–	4
No. 24 TCU	7	–	1	11	–	2
Memphis	5	–	3	9	–	4
Louisville	5	–	3	9	–	4
South Florida	5	–	3	7	–	4
Houston	4	–	4	7	–	6
UAB	4	–	4	5	–	7
Tulane	3	–	5	5	–	7
Cincinnati	2	–	6	5	–	7
East Carolina	1	–	7	1	–	11
Army	0	–	8	0	–	13
$ – Conference champion; Rankings from AP Poll

The 2003 Army Black Knights football team was an American football team that represented the United States Military Academy as a member of Conference USA (C-USA) in the 2003 NCAA Division I-A football season. The Black Knights compiled a 0–13 record, becoming the first major college football program to finish 0–13. In the annual Army–Navy Game, the Black Knights lost to Navy, 34–6.

The Black Knights struggled on both offense and defense, being outscored by a combined total of 476 to 206. Army was shutout twice during the season, which happened in back-to-back games. The Black Knights would be competitive in two games, losing by six to East Carolina (32–38) after a comeback attempt fell just short then lost by four the following week to Cincinnati (29–33), giving up what would be the game-winning touchdown midway through the 4th quarter.

Todd Berry began the year in his fourth season as the team's head coach. Berry coached the first six games before being fired following a 10–34 loss to Louisville, finishing his career at Army with an overall record of 5–35. Berry's winning percentage of .125 is the lowest of any Army head coach who coached for more than six games. Defensive line coach John Mumford was named interim head coach for the final seven games. Mumford would be retained by the Black Knights' next head coach, Bobby Ross, as well as his predecessor, Stan Brock, serving as the team's defensive coordinator from 2004 to 2008.

2003 saw Army quarterback Zac Dahman break the FBS record for the most losses in a season, with 13, breaking the previous record of 12 held by Dan Robinson of the 1998 Hawaii Rainbow Warriors.

== Schedule ==
Date	Time	Opponent	Site	TV	Result	Attendance	Source
September 6	1:00 p.m.	Connecticut*	Michie Stadium; West Point, NY		L 21–48	30,523	
September 13	3:30 p.m.	Rutgers*	Michie Stadium; West Point, NY	ESPN Plus	L 21–36	30,035	
September 20	3:30 p.m.	Tulane	Michie Stadium; West Point, NY	ESPN Plus	L 33–50	27,024	
September 27	1:00 p.m.	South Florida	Michie Stadium; West Point, NY (College GameDay)	RNN	L 0–28	30,509	
October 4	7:00 p.m.	at No. 20 TCU	Amon G. Carter Stadium; Fort Worth, TX	ESPN2	L 0–27	39,282	
October 11	3:00 p.m.	at Louisville	Papa John's Cardinal Stadium; Louisville, KY		L 10–34	40,432	
October 18	1:00 p.m.	East Carolina	Michie Stadium; West Point, NY		L 32–38	35,032	
October 25	3:00 p.m.	at Cincinnati	Nippert Stadium; Cincinnati, OH	ESPN Plus	L 29–33	22,025	
November 1	3:00 p.m.	at UAB	Legion Field; Birmingham, AL		L 9–24	22,020	
November 8	12:00 p.m.	at Air Force*	Falcon Stadium; Colorado Springs, CO (Commander-in-Chief's Trophy)		L 3–31	50,108	
November 15	12:00 p.m.	Houston	Michie Stadium; West Point, NY		L 14–34	31,638	
November 22		at Hawaii*	Aloha Stadium; Honolulu, HI	KFVE	L 28–59		
December 6		vs. Navy*	Lincoln Financial Field; Philadelphia, PA (Army–Navy Game)	CBS	L 6–34		
*Non-conference game; Rankings from AP Poll released prior to the game; All times are in Eastern time

== Game summaries ==
=== Connecticut ===
	1	2	3	4	Total
Huskies	6	28	0	14	48
Black Knights	0	0	14	7	21

Statistics	CONN	ARMY
First downs	24	20
Total yards	481	244
Rushing yards	164	44
Passing yards	317	200
Turnovers	2	1
Time of possession	26:04	33:56

Team	Category	Player	Statistics
Connecticut	Passing	Dan Orlovsky	26/36, 317 yards, 5 TD, 2 INT
Connecticut	Rushing	Terry Caulley	18 rushes, 102 yards, 2 TD
Connecticut	Receiving	Shaun Feldeisen	5 receptions, 98 yards, TD
Army	Passing	Zac Dahman	17/29, 143 yards, 2 TD, INT
Army	Rushing	Carlton Jones	15 rushes, 48 yards
Army	Receiving	Aaron Alexander	5 receptions, 68 yards, TD

=== Rutgers ===
	1	2	3	4	Total
Scarlet Knights	7	6	13	10	36
Black Knights	0	0	7	14	21

Statistics	RUTG	ARMY
First downs		
Total yards		
Rushing yards		
Passing yards		
Turnovers		
Time of possession		

Team	Category	Player	Statistics
Rutgers	Passing		
Rutgers	Rushing		
Rutgers	Receiving		
Army	Passing		
Army	Rushing		
Army	Receiving		

=== Tulane ===
	1	2	3	4	Total
Green Wave	7	15	7	21	50
Black Knights	3	3	7	20	33

Statistics	TUL	ARMY
First downs		
Total yards		
Rushing yards		
Passing yards		
Turnovers		
Time of possession		

Team	Category	Player	Statistics
Tulane	Passing		
Tulane	Rushing		
Tulane	Receiving		
Army	Passing		
Army	Rushing		
Army	Receiving		

=== South Florida ===
	1	2	3	4	Total
Bulls	0	13	0	15	28
Black Knights	0	0	0	0	0

Statistics	USF	ARMY
First downs		
Total yards		
Rushing yards		
Passing yards		
Turnovers		
Time of possession		

Team	Category	Player	Statistics
South Florida	Passing		
South Florida	Rushing		
South Florida	Receiving		
Army	Passing		
Army	Rushing		
Army	Receiving		

=== At No. 20 TCU ===
	1	2	3	4	Total
Black Knights	0	0	0	0	0
No. 20 Horned Frogs	3	3	14	7	27

Statistics	ARMY	TCU
First downs		
Total yards		
Rushing yards		
Passing yards		
Turnovers		
Time of possession		

Team	Category	Player	Statistics
Army	Passing		
Army	Rushing		
Army	Receiving		
TCU	Passing		
TCU	Rushing		
TCU	Receiving		

=== At Louisville ===
	1	2	3	4	Total
Black Knights	3	7	0	0	10
Cardinals	3	14	17	0	34

Statistics	ARMY	LOU
First downs		
Total yards		
Rushing yards		
Passing yards		
Turnovers		
Time of possession		

Team	Category	Player	Statistics
Army	Passing		
Army	Rushing		
Army	Receiving		
Louisville	Passing		
Louisville	Rushing		
Louisville	Receiving		

=== East Carolina ===
	1	2	3	4	Total
Pirates	0	21	10	7	38
Black Knights	7	7	0	18	32

Statistics	ECU	ARMY
First downs		
Total yards		
Rushing yards		
Passing yards		
Turnovers		
Time of possession		

Team	Category	Player	Statistics
East Carolina	Passing		
East Carolina	Rushing		
East Carolina	Receiving		
Army	Passing		
Army	Rushing		
Army	Receiving		

=== At Cincinnati ===
	1	2	3	4	Total
Black Knights	7	7	7	8	29
Bearcats	7	10	9	7	33

Statistics	ARMY	CIN
First downs		
Total yards		
Rushing yards		
Passing yards		
Turnovers		
Time of possession		

Team	Category	Player	Statistics
Army	Passing		
Army	Rushing		
Army	Receiving		
Cincinnati	Passing		
Cincinnati	Rushing		
Cincinnati	Receiving		

=== At UAB ===
	1	2	3	4	Total
Black Knights	0	0	0	9	9
Blazers	0	14	3	7	24

Statistics	ARMY	UAB
First downs		
Total yards		
Rushing yards		
Passing yards		
Turnovers		
Time of possession		

Team	Category	Player	Statistics
Army	Passing		
Army	Rushing		
Army	Receiving		
UAB	Passing		
UAB	Rushing		
UAB	Receiving		

=== At Air Force ===
	1	2	3	4	Total
Black Knights	0	0	3	0	3
Falcons	3	13	15	0	31

Statistics	ARMY	AFA
First downs	17	25
Total yards	199	446
Rushing yards	141	372
Passing yards	58	74
Turnovers	6	0
Time of possession	23:59	36:01

Team	Category	Player	Statistics
Army	Passing	Zac Dahman	9/27, 63 yards, 2 INT
Army	Rushing	Carlton Jones	20 rushes, 90 yards
Army	Receiving	Aaron Alexander	2 receptions, 22 yards
Air Force	Passing	Chance Harridge	8/12, 71 yards
Air Force	Rushing	Chance Harridge	12 rushes, 80 yards
Air Force	Receiving	Kris Holstege	2 receptions, 28 yards

=== Houston ===
	1	2	3	4	Total
Cougars	7	13	14	0	34
Black Knights	7	0	0	7	14

Statistics	HOU	ARMY
First downs		
Total yards		
Rushing yards		
Passing yards		
Turnovers		
Time of possession		

Team	Category	Player	Statistics
Houston	Passing		
Houston	Rushing		
Houston	Receiving		
Army	Passing		
Army	Rushing		
Army	Receiving		

=== At Hawaii ===
	1	2	3	4	Total
Black Knights	0	7	14	7	28
Warriors	17	14	14	14	59

Statistics	ARMY	HAW
First downs		
Total yards		
Rushing yards		
Passing yards		
Turnovers		
Time of possession		

Team	Category	Player	Statistics
Army	Passing		
Army	Rushing		
Army	Receiving		
Hawaii	Passing		
Hawaii	Rushing		
Hawaii	Receiving		

=== Vs. Navy ===
	1	2	3	4	Total
Midshipmen	7	6	7	14	34
Black Knights	0	6	0	0	6

Statistics	NAVY	ARMY
First downs	24	13
Total yards	414	198
Rushing yards	359	83
Passing yards	55	115
Turnovers	1	2
Time of possession	35:15	24:45

Team	Category	Player	Statistics
Navy	Passing	Craig Candeto	4/9, 55 yards, INT
Navy	Rushing	Kyle Eckel	29 rushes, 152 yards, 2 TD
Navy	Receiving	Eric Roberts	2 receptions, 31 yards
Army	Passing	Zac Dahman	16/31, 115 yards, 2 INT
Army	Rushing	Carlton Jones	16 rushes, 39 yards, TD
Army	Receiving	Aaron Alexander	5 receptions, 60 yards

== Roster ==
2003 Army Black Knights football team roster
Players
Coaches
Offense

Pos.	#	Name	Class
WR		Aaron Alexander	Jr
G		Pete Bier	So
RB		D.J. Blackledge	Jr
WR		Bruce Brown	So
WR		Blaine Cooper	So
QB		Zac Dahman	So
G		Andy Dytrych	Jr
C		David Evetts	Jr
OT		Joel Glover	Jr
G		Jake Holly	Jr
TE		Doug Horaist	Jr
RB		Carlton Jones	So
TE		Christian Montagliani	Jr
WR		Jacob Murphy	So
QB	5	Reggie Nevels	Jr
OT		Seth Nieman	Jr
OT		Regan Tatford	Jr
C		Justin Troy	So
OT		Brad Waudby	Sr
WR		William White	Jr
G		Adam Wojcik	Jr
WR		Clint Woody	Sr

Defense

Pos.	#	Name	Class
DE		Keenan Beasley	Jr
DE		Odene Braithwaite	Jr
CB		Delente Brewer	Jr
DE		Mike Clark	Jr
LB		Curt Daniels	Jr
LB		Seth Gulsby	So
LB		Brian Hill	Sr
DE		Ryan Johnson	Jr
LB		Taylor Justice	So
LB	4	Ryan Kent	Sr
DT		Trey Landry	Jr
CB		Jonathan Lewis	Jr
DT		Seth Lotts	So
LB		Matt Maimone	Jr
CB		Mario Price	So
LB		Mike Resnick	Jr
DT		Tommy Ryan	So
CB		Ray Stith	So
DT		Will Sullivan	Jr
S		Dhyan Tarver	So
LB		Greg Washington	Jr
S		Lucius Weaver	Jr

Special teams

Pos.	#	Name	Class
P		Alex Bradford	Jr
P		Tony Dyrenforth	So
K		Joe Riley	So
K		Anthony Zurisko	Sr

Head coach

- Todd Berry
  First six games
- John Mumford
  Defensive line/Interim head coach

Coordinators/assistant coaches

- John Bond
  Offensive coordinator/Quarterbacks
- Dennis Therrell
  Defensive coordinator
- Denny Creehan
  Special teams coordinator

Legend

- (C) Team captain
- (S) Suspended
- (I) Ineligible
- Injured
- Redshirt

Roster
Last update: December 12, 2019
