= 2003 TCU Horned Frogs football team =

American college football season

2003 TCU Horned Frogs football

Fort Worth Bowl vs Boise State, L 31–34
- Conference: Conference USA

Ranking
- Coaches: No. 24
- AP: No. 25
- Record: 11–2 (7–1 C-USA)
- Head coach: Gary Patterson (3rd season)
- Offensive coordinator: Mike Schultz (6th season)
- Offensive scheme: Spread
- Defensive coordinator: David Bailiff (2nd season)
- Base defense: 4–2–5
- Home stadium: Amon G. Carter Stadium

2003 Conference USA football standings
	Conf.			Overall
Team	W		L	W		L
Southern Miss $	8	–	0	9	–	4
No. 24 TCU	7	–	1	11	–	2
Memphis	5	–	3	9	–	4
Louisville	5	–	3	9	–	4
South Florida	5	–	3	7	–	4
Houston	4	–	4	7	–	6
UAB	4	–	4	5	–	7
Tulane	3	–	5	5	–	7
Cincinnati	2	–	6	5	–	7
East Carolina	1	–	7	1	–	11
Army	0	–	8	0	–	13
$ – Conference champion; Rankings from AP Poll

The 2003 TCU Horned Frogs football team represented Texas Christian University in the 2003 NCAA Division I-A football season. TCU finished with an 11–2 (7–1 C-USA) record. The team was coached by Gary Patterson and played their home games at Amon G. Carter Stadium, which is located on campus in Fort Worth.

== Schedule ==
Date	Time	Opponent	Rank	Site	TV	Result	Attendance	Source
September 1	7:00 p.m.	at Tulane	No. 25	Louisiana Superdome; New Orleans, LA	ESPN	W 38–35	28,966	
September 6	6:00 p.m.	Navy*	No. 25	Amon G. Carter Stadium; Fort Worth, TX		W 17–3	35,688	
September 20	6:00 p.m.	Vanderbilt*	No. 20	Amon G. Carter Stadium; Fort Worth, TX		W 30–14	37,192	
September 27	9:00 p.m.	at Arizona*	No. 19	Arizona Stadium; Tucson, AZ		W 13–10 ^{OT}	40,515	
October 4	6:00 p.m.	Army	No. 20	Amon G. Carter Stadium; Fort Worth, TX		W 27–0	39,282	
October 10	7:00 p.m.	at South Florida	No. 18	Raymond James Stadium; Tampa, FL	ESPN2	W 13–10	33,368	
October 18	6:00 p.m.	UAB^{†}	No. 16	Amon G. Carter Stadium; Fort Worth, TX		W 27–24	28,927	
October 25	7:00 p.m.	at Houston	No. 15	Robertson Stadium; Houston, TX		W 62–55	21,156	
November 5	6:30 p.m.	Louisville	No. 13	Amon G. Carter Stadium; Fort Worth, TX	ESPN2	W 31–28	33,681	
November 15	2:00 p.m.	Cincinnati	No. 10	Amon G. Carter Stadium; Fort Worth, TX		W 43–10	42,161	
November 20	6:30 p.m.	at Southern Miss	No. 10	M. M. Roberts Stadium; Hattiesburg, MS	ESPN	L 28–40	30,141	
November 29	2:00 p.m.	at SMU*	No. 19	Gerald J. Ford Stadium; Dallas, TX (rivalry)		W 20–13	20,112	
December 23	8:30 p.m.	Boise State*	No. 19	Amon G. Carter Stadium; Fort Worth, TX (Fort Worth Bowl)	ESPN	L 31–34	38,023	
*Non-conference game; ^{†}Homecoming; Rankings from AP Poll released prior to the game; All times are in Central time

== Rankings ==
Ranking movements Legend: ██ Increase in ranking ██ Decrease in ranking RV = Received votes
	Week																
Poll	Pre	1	2	3	4	5	6	7	8	9	10	11	12	13	14	15	Final
AP	25	25	22	20	19	20	18	16	15	15	13	10	10	19	19	19	25
Coaches	RV	RV	23	19	17	21	17	13	13	13	12	9	9	17	19	19	24
BCS	Not released								14	12	9	6	8	17	17	18	Not released

== Roster ==
2003 TCU Horned Frogs football team roster
Players
Coaches
Offense

Pos.	#	Name	Class
QB	15	Tye Gunn	So
WR	17	Cory Rodgers	Fr
RB	30	Lonta Hobbs	So
OT	55	Anthony Alabi	Jr

Defense

Pos.	#	Name	Class
CB	11	Drew Coleman	Jr
DE	21	Bo Schobel	Sr
DE	94	Robert Pollard	Sr

Special teams

Pos.	#	Name	Class
K	9	Nick Browne	Sr

Head coach

- Gary Patterson

Coordinators/assistant coaches

Legend

- (C) Team captain
- (S) Suspended
- (I) Ineligible
- Injured
- Redshirt

Roster
Last update: 2003-12-05
