= 2003 Memphis Tigers football team =

American college football season

2003 Memphis Tigers football

New Orleans Bowl champion

New Orleans Bowl, W 27–17 vs. North Texas
- Conference: Conference USA
- Record: 9–4 (5–3 C-USA)
- Head coach: Tommy West (3rd season)
- Offensive coordinator: Randy Fichtner (3rd season)
- Offensive scheme: Pro-style
- Defensive coordinator: Joe Lee Dunn (3rd season)
- Base defense: 3–3–5
- Home stadium: Liberty Bowl Memorial Stadium

2003 Conference USA football standings
	Conf.			Overall
Team	W		L	W		L
Southern Miss $	8	–	0	9	–	4
No. 24 TCU	7	–	1	11	–	2
Memphis	5	–	3	9	–	4
Louisville	5	–	3	9	–	4
South Florida	5	–	3	7	–	4
Houston	4	–	4	7	–	6
UAB	4	–	4	5	–	7
Tulane	3	–	5	5	–	7
Cincinnati	2	–	6	5	–	7
East Carolina	1	–	7	1	–	11
Army	0	–	8	0	–	13
$ – Conference champion; Rankings from AP Poll

The 2003 Memphis Tigers football team represented the University of Memphis in the 2003 NCAA Division I-A football season. Memphis competed as a member of the Conference USA. The team was led by head coach Tommy West. The Tigers played their home games at the Liberty Bowl Memorial Stadium.

== Schedule ==
Date	Time	Opponent	Site	TV	Result	Attendance	Source
August 30	7:00 pm	Tennessee Tech*	Liberty Bowl Memorial Stadium; Memphis, TN		W 40–10	26,101	
September 6	11:00 am	Ole Miss*	Liberty Bowl Memorial Stadium; Memphis, TN (rivalry)	ESPN2	W 44–34	51,914	
September 13	6:00 pm	at Southern Miss	M. M. Roberts Stadium; Hattiesburg, MS (Black and Blue Bowl)		L 6–23	29,233	
September 27	1:00 pm	Arkansas State*	Liberty Bowl Memorial Stadium; Memphis, TN (Paint Bucket Bowl)		W 38–16	38,093	
October 4	1:00 pm	UAB	Liberty Bowl Memorial Stadium; Memphis, TN (Battle for the Bones)		L 10–24	37,354	
October 11	1:30 pm	at Mississippi State*	Davis Wade Stadium; Starkville, MS		L 27–35	45,329	
October 18	7:00 pm	at Houston	Robertson Stadium; Houston, TX		W 45–14	22,623	
October 25	1:30 pm	at Tulane	Louisiana Superdome; New Orleans, LA		W 41–9	19,357	
November 1	1:00 pm	East Carolina	Liberty Bowl Memorial Stadium; Memphis, TN		W 41–24	40,131	
November 15	2:00 pm	at Louisville	Papa John's Cardinal Stadium; Louisville, KY (rivalry)		W 37–7	30,114	
November 22	1:00 pm	Cincinnati	Liberty Bowl Memorial Stadium; Memphis, TN (rivalry)		W 21–16	42,884	
November 29	1:00 pm	South Florida	Liberty Bowl Memorial Stadium; Memphis, TN		L 16–21	47,875	
December 16	6:00 pm	vs. North Texas*	Louisiana Superdome; New Orleans, L] (New Orleans Bowl)	ESPN2	W 27–17	25,184	
*Non-conference game; All times are in Central time

== Roster ==
2003 Memphis Tigers football team roster
Players
Coaches
Offense

Pos.	#	Name	Class
RB	24	Dante Brown	Sr
RB	20	DeAngelo Williams	So
QB	18	Danny Wimprine	Jr

Defense

Pos.	#	Name	Class
DT	50	Eric Taylor	Sr

Special teams

Pos.	#	Name	Class
K	32	Stephen Gostkowski	So

Head coach

- Tommy West

Coordinators/assistant coaches

- Russ Huesman
  (Tight ends coach)
- Chris Rumph
  (Outside linebackers coach)

Legend

- (C) Team captain
- (S) Suspended
- (I) Ineligible
- Injured
- Redshirt

Roster
Last update: 2003-10-04
