= 2003 New Orleans Bowl =

Memphis Tigers	North Texas Mean Green
(8–4)	(9–3)
C-USA	Sun Belt
27	17
Head coach: Tommy West	Head coach: Darrell Dickey
	1	2	3	4	Total
Memphis	7	10	0	10	27
North Texas	3	0	7	7	17
- Date: December 16, 2003
- Season: 2003
- Stadium: Louisiana Superdome
- Location: New Orleans, Louisiana
- MVP: Memphis QB Danny Wimprine
- Referee: John Smith (Big East)
- Attendance: 25,184
- Payout: US$750,000

United States TV coverage
- Network: ESPN2
- Announcers: Dave Barnett, (play by play); Chris Spielman (analyst); Bill Curry (analyst)

The 2003 New Orleans Bowl featured the North Texas Mean Green and the Memphis Tigers. It was North Texas' third consecutive New Orleans Bowl appearance.

Kicker Nick Bazaldua got North Texas on the board first with a 47-yard field goal to give the team an early 3–0 lead. Memphis quarterback Danny Wimprine scored on a 7-yard touchdown run to give Memphis a 7–3 lead. In the second quarter, Wimprine found Chris Kelley for a 10-yard touchdown pass, and a 14–3 lead. Stephen Gostkowski connected on a 21-yard field goal before halftime, to increase the lead to 17–3.

In the third quarter, running back Patrick Cobbs scored on a 35-yard touchdown run to bring the score to 17–10. In the fourth quarter, running back LaKendus Cole scored on a 5-yard touchdown run to increase the lead to 24–10. Patrick Cobbs scored his second touchdown on a 2-yard run to bring the score to 24–17. Stephen Gostkowski finished the scoring with a 42-yard field goal, to make the final 27–17.
