= 2003 South Florida Bulls football team =

American college football season

2003 South Florida Bulls football
- Conference: Conference USA
- Record: 7–4 (5–3 CUSA)
- Head coach: Jim Leavitt (7th season)
- Offensive coordinator: Mike Hobbie (3rd season)
- Offensive scheme: Multiple
- Co-defensive coordinators: Rick Kravitz (7th season); Wally Burnham (3rd season)
- Base defense: 3–4
- Home stadium: Raymond James Stadium

2003 Conference USA football standings
	Conf.			Overall
Team	W		L	W		L
Southern Miss $	8	–	0	9	–	4
No. 24 TCU	7	–	1	11	–	2
Memphis	5	–	3	9	–	4
Louisville	5	–	3	9	–	4
South Florida	5	–	3	7	–	4
Houston	4	–	4	7	–	6
UAB	4	–	4	5	–	7
Tulane	3	–	5	5	–	7
Cincinnati	2	–	6	5	–	7
East Carolina	1	–	7	1	–	11
Army	0	–	8	0	–	13
$ – Conference champion; Rankings from AP Poll

The 2003 South Florida Bulls football team represented the University of South Florida (USF) in the 2003 NCAA Division I-A football season. Their head coach was Jim Leavitt, and the USF Bulls played their home games at Raymond James Stadium in Tampa, FL. The 2003 college football season was only the 7th season overall for the Bulls, and their first season in Conference USA.

== Schedule ==
Date	Time	Opponent	Site	TV	Result	Attendance	Source
August 30	3:00 p.m.	at Alabama*	Legion Field; Birmingham, AL	ESPN	L 17–40	76,780	
September 6	7:00 p.m.	No. 19 (I-AA) Nicholls State*	Raymond James Stadium; Tampa, FL		W 27–17	26,460	
September 27	1:00 p.m.	at Army	Michie Stadium; West Point, NY (College GameDay)	RNN	W 28–0	30,509	
October 4	7:00 p.m.	Louisville	Raymond James Stadium; Tampa, FL	FSN	W 31–28 ^{2OT}	36,044	
October 10	8:00 p.m.	No. 18 TCU	Raymond James Stadium; Tampa, FL	ESPN2	L 10–13	33,368	
October 18	7:00 p.m.	Charleston Southern*	Raymond James Stadium; Tampa, FL		W 55–7	28,365	
October 25	3:00 p.m.	at Southern Miss	M. M. Roberts Stadium; Hattiesburg, MS	FSN	L 6–27	23,708	
October 31	7:30 p.m.	Cincinnati^{†}	Raymond James Stadium; Tampa, FL	ESPN2	W 24–17 ^{2OT}	28,616	
November 8	2:00 p.m.	at East Carolina	Dowdy–Ficklen Stadium; Greenville, NC		W 38–37 ^{2OT}	27,100	
November 22	7:00 p.m.	UAB	Raymond James Stadium; Tampa, FL	WFTS	L 19–22	30,216	
November 29	2:00 p.m.	at Memphis	Liberty Bowl Memorial Stadium; Memphis, TN	FSN	W 21–16	47,875	
*Non-conference game; ^{†}Homecoming; Rankings from AP Poll released prior to the game; All times are in Eastern time
