= 2003 Mississippi State Bulldogs football team =

American college football season

2003 Mississippi State Bulldogs football
- Conference: Southeastern Conference
- Western Division
- Record: 2–10 (1–7 SEC)
- Head coach: Jackie Sherrill (13th season)
- Offensive coordinator: Morris Watts (1st season)
- Defensive coordinator: Ron Cooper (1st season)
- Home stadium: Davis Wade Stadium

2003 Southeastern Conference football standings
	Conf.			Overall
Team	W		L	W		L
Eastern Division
No. 7 Georgia xy	6	–	2	11	–	3
No. 15 Tennessee x	6	–	2	10	–	3
No. 24 Florida x	6	–	2	8	–	5
South Carolina	2	–	6	5	–	7
Vanderbilt	1	–	7	2	–	10
Kentucky	1	–	7	4	–	8
Western Division
No. 2 LSU xy$#	7	–	1	13	–	1
No. 13 Ole Miss x	7	–	1	10	–	3
Auburn	5	–	3	8	–	5
Arkansas	4	–	4	9	–	4
Alabama	2	–	6	4	–	9
Mississippi State	1	–	7	2	–	10
Championship: LSU 34, Georgia 13
# – BCS National Champion; $ – BCS representative as conference champion; x – Division champion/co-champions; y – Championship game participant; Rankings from AP Poll

The 2003 Mississippi State Bulldogs football team represented Mississippi State University as a member of the Western Division of the Southern Conference (SEC) during the 2003 NCAA Division I-A football season. Led by Jackie Sherrill in his 13th and final season as head coach, the Bulldogs compiled an overall record of 2–10 with a mark of 1–7 in conference play, placing last out of six teams in the SEC's Western Division for the third consecutive season. Mississippi State played home games at Davis Wade Stadium in Starkville, Mississippi.

== Schedule ==
Date	Time	Opponent	Site	TV	Result	Attendance
August 31	8:00 pm	Oregon*	Davis Wade Stadium; Starkville, MS	ESPN2	L 34–42	52,856
September 13	7:00 pm	at Tulane*	Louisiana Superdome; New Orleans, LA		L 28–31	33,723
September 20	7:00 pm	at Houston*	Robertson Stadium; Houston, TX		L 35–42	26,233
September 27	8:00 pm	No. 7 LSU	Davis Wade Stadium; Starkville, MS (rivalry)	ESPN2	L 6–41	45,835
October 4	1:30 pm	Vanderbilt	Davis Wade Stadium; Starkville, MS		W 30–21	40,156
October 11	1:30 pm	Memphis*^{†}	Davis Wade Stadium; Starkville, MS		W 35–27	45,329
October 18	1:30 pm	at No. 19 Auburn	Jordan-Hare Stadium; Auburn, AL	PPV	L 13–45	86,063
October 25	11:30 am	at Kentucky	Commonwealth Stadium; Lexington, KY	JPS	L 17–42	57,141
November 8	11:30 am	Alabama	Davis Wade Stadium; Starkville, MS (rivalry)	JPS	L 0–38	48,242
November 15	11:30 am	at No. 9 Tennessee	Neyland Stadium; Knoxville, TN	JPS	L 21–59	104,223
November 22	1:00 pm	at Arkansas	Donald W. Reynolds Razorback Stadium; Fayetteville, AR		L 6–52	62,547
November 27	6:45 pm	No. 17 Ole Miss	Davis Wade Stadium; Starkville, MS (Egg Bowl)	ESPN	L 0–31	53,582
*Non-conference game; ^{†}Homecoming; Rankings from AP Poll released prior to the game; All times are in Central time
