= 2003 Louisville Cardinals football team =

American college football season

2003 Louisville Cardinals football

GMAC Bowl, L 28–49 vs. Miami (OH)
- Conference: Conference USA
- Record: 9–4 (5–3 C-USA)
- Head coach: Bobby Petrino (1st season)
- Offensive coordinator: Paul Petrino (1st season)
- Offensive scheme: Multiple
- Defensive coordinator: Mike Gillhamer (1st season)
- Base defense: 4–3
- Home stadium: Papa John's Cardinal Stadium

2003 Conference USA football standings
	Conf.			Overall
Team	W		L	W		L
Southern Miss $	8	–	0	9	–	4
No. 24 TCU	7	–	1	11	–	2
Memphis	5	–	3	9	–	4
Louisville	5	–	3	9	–	4
South Florida	5	–	3	7	–	4
Houston	4	–	4	7	–	6
UAB	4	–	4	5	–	7
Tulane	3	–	5	5	–	7
Cincinnati	2	–	6	5	–	7
East Carolina	1	–	7	1	–	11
Army	0	–	8	0	–	13
$ – Conference champion; Rankings from AP Poll

The 2003 Louisville Cardinals football team represented the University of Louisville in the 2003 NCAA Division I-A football season. The team, led by Bobby Petrino in his first year at the school, played their home games in Papa John's Cardinal Stadium.

== Schedule ==
Date	Time	Opponent	Site	TV	Result	Attendance	Source
August 31	6:30 pm	at Kentucky*	Commonwealth Stadium; Lexington, KY (Governor's Cup)	ESPN2	W 40–24	70,467	
September 13	1:30 pm	at Syracuse*	Carrier Dome; Syracuse, NY	WDRB	W 30–20	38,550	
September 20	3:00 pm	UTEP*	Papa John's Cardinal Stadium; Louisville, KY		W 42–14	40,205	
September 27	3:00 pm	Temple*	Papa John's Cardinal Stadium; Louisville, KY		W 21–12	38,489	
October 4	7:00 pm	at South Florida	Raymond James Stadium; Tampa, FL	ESPN Plus	L 28–31 ^{2OT}	36,044	
October 11	3:00 pm	Army	Papa John's Cardinal Stadium; Louisville, KY		W 34–10	40,432	
October 17	8:00 pm	Tulane	Papa John's Cardinal Stadium; Louisville, KY	ESPN	W 47–28	38,119	
October 25	2:00 pm	at East Carolina	Dowdy–Ficklen Stadium; Greenville, NC	WDRB	W 36–20	33,420	
November 5	7:30 pm	at No. 13 TCU	Amon G. Carter Stadium; Fort Worth, TX	ESPN2	L 28–31	33,681	
November 15	3:00 pm	Memphis	Papa John's Cardinal Stadium; Louisville, KY (rivalry)		L 7–37	30,114	
November 22	3:15 pm	Houston	Papa John's Cardinal Stadium; Louisville, KY		W 66–45	33,268	
November 28	11:00 am	at Cincinnati	Nippert Stadium; Cincinnati, OH (The Keg of Nails)	ESPN2	W 43–40	11,993	
December 18	7:30 pm	vs. No. 14 Miami (OH)*	Ladd–Peebles Stadium; Mobile, AL (GMAC Bowl)	ESPN2	L 28–49	40,620	
*Non-conference game; Rankings from AP Poll released prior to the game; All times are in Eastern time

== Roster ==
2003 Louisville Cardinals football team roster
Players
Coaches
Offense

Pos.	#	Name	Class
WR	2	Tiger Jones	Jr
QB	7	Justin Rascati	Fr
QB	17	Stefan LeFors	Jr
RB	23	Lionel Gates	Jr
RB	32	Eric Shelton	Jr
G	59	Jason Spitz	So
C	68	Dan Koons	Sr
OL	70	Will Rabatin	Jr
WR	82	J. R. Russell	Jr
WR	85	Harry Douglas	Fr
TE	89	Richard Owens	Sr

Defense

Pos.	#	Name	Class
S	1	Kerry Rhodes	Jr
CB	21	William Gay	Fr
LB	54	Robert McCune	Jr
DE	58	Elvis Dumervil	So
DT	90	Scott Lopez	Sr
DL	91	Amobi Okoye	Fr
DT	92	Montavious Stanley	So
LB	97	Brandon Johnson	So

Special teams

Pos.	#	Name	Class

Head coach

- Bobby Petrino

Coordinators/assistant coaches

Legend

- (C) Team captain
- (S) Suspended
- (I) Ineligible
- Injured
- Redshirt

Roster
