= 2003 East Carolina Pirates football team =

American college football season

2003 East Carolina Pirates football
- Conference: Conference USA
- Record: 1–11 (1–7 C-USA)
- Head coach: John Thompson (1st season)
- Offensive coordinator: Rick Stockstill (1st season)
- Offensive scheme: Multiple
- Defensive coordinator: Jerry Odom (1st season)
- Base defense: 4–3
- Home stadium: Dowdy–Ficklen Stadium

2003 Conference USA football standings
	Conf.			Overall
Team	W		L	W		L
Southern Miss $	8	–	0	9	–	4
No. 24 TCU	7	–	1	11	–	2
Memphis	5	–	3	9	–	4
Louisville	5	–	3	9	–	4
South Florida	5	–	3	7	–	4
Houston	4	–	4	7	–	6
UAB	4	–	4	5	–	7
Tulane	3	–	5	5	–	7
Cincinnati	2	–	6	5	–	7
East Carolina	1	–	7	1	–	11
Army	0	–	8	0	–	13
$ – Conference champion; Rankings from AP Poll

The 2003 East Carolina Pirates football team was an American football team that represented East Carolina University as a member of Conference USA during the 2003 NCAA Division I-A football season. In their first season under head coach John Thompson, the team compiled a 1–11 record (1–7 in Conference USA).

== Schedule ==
Date	Time	Opponent	Site	TV	Result	Attendance	Source
September 1	12:00 pm	at Cincinnati	Nippert Stadium; Cincinnati, OH	ESPN	L 3–40	28,011	
September 6	7:00 pm	West Virginia*	Dowdy–Ficklen Stadium; Greenville, NC		L 7–48	36,088	
September 13	7:00 pm	at No. 2 Miami (FL)*	Miami Orange Bowl; Miami, FL	ESPN2	L 3–38	65,825	
September 20	6:30 pm	at Wake Forest*	Groves Stadium; Winston-Salem, NC		L 16–34	28,074	
September 30	7:30 pm	Houston	Dowdy–Ficklen Stadium; Greenville, NC	ESPN2	L 13–27	33,250	
October 11	3:30 pm	North Carolina*	Dowdy–Ficklen Stadium; Greenville, NC	ESPN+	L 17–28	44,040	
October 18	1:00 pm	at Army	Michie Stadium; West Point, NY		W 38–32	35,032	
October 25	2:00 pm	Louisville	Dowdy–Ficklen Stadium; Greenville, NC		L 20–36	33,420	
November 1	2:00 pm	at Memphis	Liberty Bowl; Memphis, TN		L 24–41	40,131	
November 8	2:00 pm	South Florida^{†}	Dowdy–Ficklen Stadium; Greenville, NC		L 37–38 ^{2OT}	27,100	
November 22	2:30 pm	at Tulane	Louisiana Superdome; New Orleans, LA		L 18–28	19,226	
November 29	2:00 pm	Southern Miss	Dowdy–Ficklen Stadium; Greenville, NC		L 21–38	24,175	
*Non-conference game; ^{†}Homecoming; Rankings from AP Poll released prior to the game; All times are in Eastern time
