= 2003 Tulane Green Wave football team =

American college football season

2003 Tulane Green Wave football
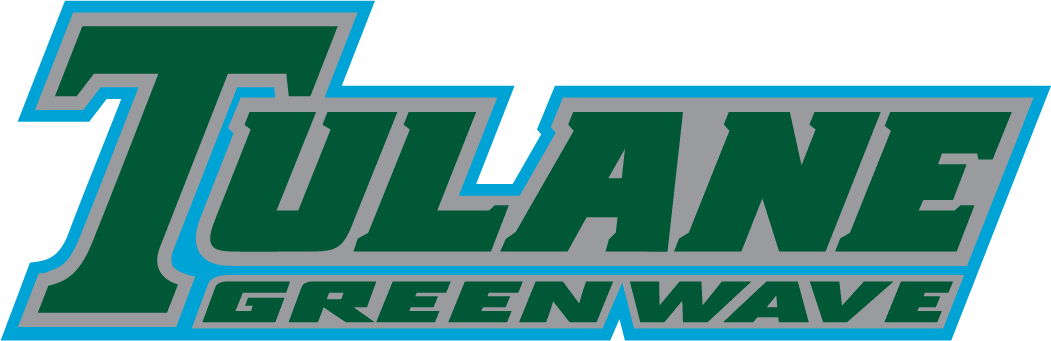
- Conference: Conference USA
- Record: 5–7 (3–5 C-USA)
- Head coach: Chris Scelfo (5th season)
- Offensive coordinator: Frank Scelfo (3rd season)
- Offensive scheme: Multiple
- Defensive coordinator: Eric Schumann (2nd season)
- Base defense: 4–3
- Home stadium: Louisiana Superdome; Tad Gormley Stadium

2003 Conference USA football standings
	Conf.			Overall
Team	W		L	W		L
Southern Miss $	8	–	0	9	–	4
No. 24 TCU	7	–	1	11	–	2
Memphis	5	–	3	9	–	4
Louisville	5	–	3	9	–	4
South Florida	5	–	3	7	–	4
Houston	4	–	4	7	–	6
UAB	4	–	4	5	–	7
Tulane	3	–	5	5	–	7
Cincinnati	2	–	6	5	–	7
East Carolina	1	–	7	1	–	11
Army	0	–	8	0	–	13
$ – Conference champion; Rankings from AP Poll

The 2003 Tulane Green Wave football team represented Tulane University in the 2003 NCAA Division I-A football season. The Green Wave played their home games at the Louisiana Superdome and Tad Gormley Stadium. They competed in Conference USA. The team was coached by head coach Chris Scelfo.

== Schedule ==
Date	Time	Opponent	Site	TV	Result	Attendance	Source
September 1	7:00 pm	No. 25 TCU	Louisiana Superdome; New Orleans, LA	ESPN	L 35–38	28,966	
September 6	7:00 pm	Northwestern State*	Tad Gormley Stadium; New Orleans, LA		W 27–24 ^{OT}	25,116	
September 14	7:00 pm	Mississippi State*	Louisiana Superdome; New Orleans, LA		W 31–28	33,723	
September 20	2:30 pm	at Army	Michie Stadium; West Point, NY	ESPN Plus	W 50–33	27,024	
September 27	6:00 pm	at No. 14 Texas*	Darrell K Royal–Texas Memorial Stadium; Austin, TX	TBS	L 18–63	83,120	
October 11	1:30 pm	Houston^{†}	Tad Gormley Stadium; New Orleans, LA		L 42–45	27,420	
October 17	7:00 pm	at Louisville	Papa John's Cardinal Stadium; Louisville, KY	ESPN	L 28–47	38,119	
October 25	1:30 pm	Memphis	Louisiana Superdome; New Orleans, LA		L 9–41	19,357	
November 1	12:30 pm	at Navy*	Navy–Marine Corps Memorial Stadium; Annapolis, MD		L 17–35	27,417	
November 8	3:00 pm	at UAB	Legion Field; Birmingham, AL		W 38–24	14,213	
November 15	2:00 pm	at Southern Miss	M. M. Roberts Stadium; Hattiesburg, MS (Battle for the Bell)	ESPN Plus	L 14–28	26,987	
November 22	1:30 pm	East Carolina	Louisiana Superdome; New Orleans, LA		W 28–18	19,226	
*Non-conference game; ^{†}Homecoming; Rankings from AP Poll released prior to the game; All times are in Central time

== 2004 NFL draft ==
Player	Position	Round	Pick	NFL Team
J. P. Losman	Quarterback	1	22	Buffalo Bills
Mewelde Moore	Running Back	4	119	Minnesota Vikings
