= 2003 Southern Miss Golden Eagles football team =

American college football season

2003 Southern Miss Golden Eagles football

C-USA champion

Liberty Bowl, L 0–17 vs. Utah
- Conference: Conference USA
- Record: 9–4 (8–0 C-USA)
- Head coach: Jeff Bower (14th season)
- Offensive coordinator: Rip Scherer (1st season)
- Offensive scheme: Pro-style
- Defensive coordinator: Tyrone Nix (3rd season)
- Base defense: 3–4
- Home stadium: M. M. Roberts Stadium

2003 Conference USA football standings
	Conf.			Overall
Team	W		L	W		L
Southern Miss $	8	–	0	9	–	4
No. 24 TCU	7	–	1	11	–	2
Memphis	5	–	3	9	–	4
Louisville	5	–	3	9	–	4
South Florida	5	–	3	7	–	4
Houston	4	–	4	7	–	6
UAB	4	–	4	5	–	7
Tulane	3	–	5	5	–	7
Cincinnati	2	–	6	5	–	7
East Carolina	1	–	7	1	–	11
Army	0	–	8	0	–	13
$ – Conference champion; Rankings from AP Poll

The 2003 Southern Miss Golden Eagles football team represented the University of Southern Mississippi in the 2003 NCAA Division I-A football season. The Golden Eagles were led by head coach Jeff Bower and played their home games at M. M. Roberts Stadium. They were a member of Conference USA.

== Schedule ==
Date	Time	Opponent	Site	TV	Result	Attendance	Source
August 30	3:00 pm	at California*	California Memorial Stadium; Berkeley, CA	HDNet	L 2–34	33,552	
September 4	6:00 pm	at UAB	Legion Field; Birmingham, AL	ESPN2	W 17–12	44,669	
September 13	6:00 pm	Memphis	M. M. Roberts Stadium; Hattiesburg, MS (Black and Blue Bowl)		W 23–6	29,233	
September 25	6:45 pm	No. 15 Nebraska*	M. M. Roberts Stadium; Hattiesburg, MS	ESPN	L 14–38	36,152	
October 4	6:00 pm	at Cincinnati	Nippert Stadium; Cincinnati, OH		W 22–20	24,522	
October 11	2:00 pm	at Alabama*	Bryant–Denny Stadium; Tuscaloosa, AL	PPV	L 3–17	83,818	
October 25	2:00 pm	South Florida	M. M. Roberts Stadium; Hattiesburg, MS		W 27–6	23,708	
November 1	2:00 pm	Louisiana–Lafayette*^{†}	M. M. Roberts Stadium; Hattiesburg, MS		W 48–3	25,649	
November 8	4:00 pm	at Houston	Robertson Stadium; Houston, TX		W 31–10	20,377	
November 15	2:00 pm	Tulane	M. M. Roberts Stadium; Hattiesburg, MS	ESPN+	W 28–14	26,987	
November 20	6:45 pm	No. 10 TCU	M. M. Roberts Stadium; Hattiesburg, MS	ESPN	W 40–28	30,141	
November 29	1:00 pm	at East Carolina	Dowdy–Ficklen Stadium; Greenville, NC		W 38–21	24,175	
December 31	2:30 pm	vs. No. 25 Utah*	Liberty Bowl Memorial Stadium; Memphis, TN (Liberty Bowl)	ESPN	L 0–17	55,989	
*Non-conference game; ^{†}Homecoming; Rankings from AP Poll released prior to the game; All times are in Central time

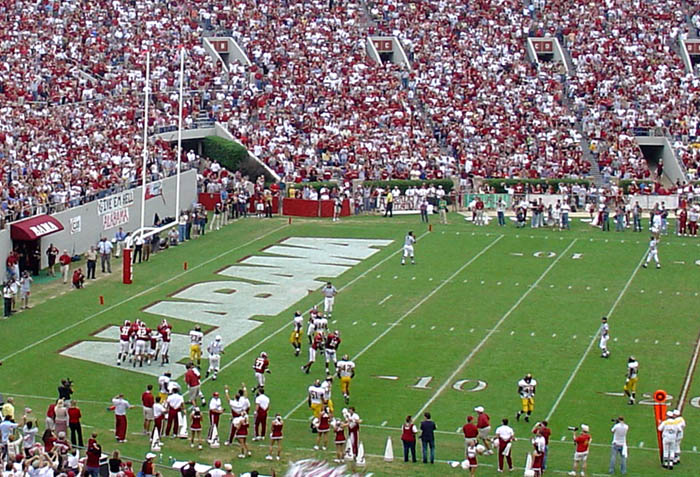
Southern Miss on the road at Alabama Crimson Tide, October 11, 2003
