= 2003 Cincinnati Bearcats football team =

American college football season

2003 Cincinnati Bearcats football
- Conference: Conference USA
- Record: 5–7 (2–6 C-USA)
- Head coach: Rick Minter (10th season)
- Offensive coordinator: Rusty Burns (2nd season)
- Offensive scheme: Spread
- Co-defensive coordinators: Mike Kolakowski (1st season); Mark Criner (1st season)
- Base defense: 4–3
- Home stadium: Nippert Stadium

2003 Conference USA football standings
	Conf.			Overall
Team	W		L	W		L
Southern Miss $	8	–	0	9	–	4
No. 24 TCU	7	–	1	11	–	2
Memphis	5	–	3	9	–	4
Louisville	5	–	3	9	–	4
South Florida	5	–	3	7	–	4
Houston	4	–	4	7	–	6
UAB	4	–	4	5	–	7
Tulane	3	–	5	5	–	7
Cincinnati	2	–	6	5	–	7
East Carolina	1	–	7	1	–	11
Army	0	–	8	0	–	13
$ – Conference champion; Rankings from AP Poll

The 2003 Cincinnati Bearcats football team represented the University of Cincinnati in the 2003 NCAA Division I-A football season. The team, coached by Rick Minter, played its home games in Nippert Stadium, as it has since 1924.

== Schedule ==
Date	Time	Opponent	Site	TV	Result	Attendance	Source
September 1	12:00 pm	East Carolina	Nippert Stadium; Cincinnati, OH	ESPN	W 40–3	28,011	
September 13	12:00 pm	at West Virginia*	Mountaineer Field; Morgantown, WV	ESPN Plus	W 15–13	51,189	
September 20	7:00 pm	Temple*	Nippert Stadium; Cincinnati, OH		W 30–24 ^{3OT}	30,405	
September 27	2:00 pm	at Miami (OH)*	Yager Stadium; Oxford, OH (Victory Bell)		L 42–37	27,512	
October 4	7:00 pm	Southern Miss	Nippert Stadium; Cincinnati, OH		L 20–22	24,522	
October 11	4:00 pm	at UAB	Legion Field; Birmingham, AL		L 14–31	17,072	
October 25	3:00 pm	Army^{†}	Nippert Stadium; Cincinnati, OH	ESPN Plus	W 33–29	22,025	
October 31	7:30 pm	at South Florida	Raymond James Stadium; Tampa, FL	ESPN2	L 17–24	28,616	
November 8	2:00 pm	Rhode Island*	Nippert Stadium; Cincinnati, OH		W 31–24	14,006	
November 15	3:00 pm	at No. 10 TCU	Amon G. Carter Stadium; Fort Worth, TX		L 10–43	42,161	
November 22	2:00 pm	at Memphis	Liberty Bowl Memorial Stadium; Memphis, TN (rivalry)		L 16–21	42,884	
November 28	11:00 am	Louisville	Nippert Stadium; Cincinnati, OH (The Keg of Nails)	ESPN2	L 40–43	11,993	
*Non-conference game; ^{†}Homecoming; Rankings from AP Poll released prior to the game; All times are in Eastern time

== Roster ==
2003 Cincinnati Bearcats football team roster
Players
Coaches
Offense

Pos.	#	Name	Class
G	70	Ryan Brown	So
TE	85	Brent Celek	Fr
QB	8	Gino Guidugli	Jr
TE	89	A. J. Lucius	Jr
WR	22	Derick Ross	So
OT	69	Jeremy Schlicher	Jr
C	66	Josh Shneyderov	Sr
G	79	Adam Shorter	Jr
OT	77	Clint Stickdorn	Jr

Defense

Pos.	#	Name	Class
DE	56	Michael Brown	So
DE	62	Trent Cole	Jr
DE	82	Angelo Craig	Fr
LB	46	Jamar Enzor	Jr
DE	91	Andre Frazier	Jr
LB	42	Tyjuan Hagler	Jr
CB	18	Daven Holly	Jr
CB	29	Zach Norton	Sr
DT	86	Mike Wright	Jr

Special teams

Pos.	#	Name	Class

Head coach

- Rick Minter

Coordinators/assistant coaches

Legend

- (C) Team captain
- (S) Suspended
- (I) Ineligible
- Injured
- Redshirt

Roster

== Awards and milestones ==
=== Conference USA honors ===
==== Offensive player of the week ====
- Week 4: Richard Hall

==== Defensive player of the week ====
- Week 3: Trent Cole

==== All-Conference USA First Team ====
- Kyle Takavitz, OG
- Trent Cole, DE

==== All-Conference USA Second Team ====
- Andre Frazier, DE
- Daven Holly, DB
- Zach Norton, DB

==== All-Conference USA Third Team ====
- Jamar Enzor, LB
