= 2003 UAB Blazers football team =

American college football season

2003 UAB Blazers football
- Conference: Conference USA
- Record: 5–7 (4–4 C-USA)
- Head coach: Watson Brown (9th season)
- Offensive coordinator: Pat Sullivan (5th season)
- Offensive scheme: Multiple
- Defensive coordinator: Wayne Bolt (1st season)
- Base defense: 4–3
- Home stadium: Legion Field

2003 Conference USA football standings
| | Conf. | | | Overall |
| Team | W | | L | W | | L |
|---|---|---|---|---|---|---|
| Southern Miss $ | 8 | – | 0 | 9 | – | 4 |
| No. 24 TCU | 7 | – | 1 | 11 | – | 2 |
| Memphis | 5 | – | 3 | 9 | – | 4 |
| Louisville | 5 | – | 3 | 9 | – | 4 |
| South Florida | 5 | – | 3 | 7 | – | 4 |
| Houston | 4 | – | 4 | 7 | – | 6 |
| UAB | 4 | – | 4 | 5 | – | 7 |
| Tulane | 3 | – | 5 | 5 | – | 7 |
| Cincinnati | 2 | – | 6 | 5 | – | 7 |
| East Carolina | 1 | – | 7 | 1 | – | 11 |
| Army | 0 | – | 8 | 0 | – | 13 |
$ – Conference champion; Rankings from AP Poll

The 2003 UAB Blazers football team represented the University of Alabama at Birmingham (UAB) as a member of the Conference USA (C-USA) during the 2003 NCAA Division I-A football season. Led by ninth-year head coach Watson Brown, the Blazers compiled an overall record of 5–7 with a mark of 4–4 in conference play, tying for sixth place in C-USA. UAB played home games at Legion Field in Birmingham, Alabama.

== Schedule ==
| Date | Time | Opponent | Site | TV | Result | Attendance | Source |
|---|---|---|---|---|---|---|---|
| August 30 | 6:00 p.m. | at Baylor* | Floyd Casey Stadium; Waco, TX | | W 24–19 | 28,732 | |
| September 4 | 6:00 p.m. | Southern Miss | Legion Field; Birmingham, AL | ESPN2 | L 12–17 | 44,669 | |
| September 13 | 6:00 p.m. | Troy State* | Legion Field; Birmingham, AL | | L 9–20 | 18,216 | |
| September 20 | 6:00 p.m. | at South Carolina* | Williams–Brice Stadium; Columbia, SC | | L 10–42 | 80,523 | |
| October 4 | 1:00 p.m. | at Memphis | Liberty Bowl Memorial Stadium; Memphis, TN (Battle for the Bones) | | W 24–10 | 37,354 | |
| October 11 | 3:00 p.m. | Cincinnati | Legion Field; Birmingham, AL | | W 31–14 | 17,072 | |
| October 18 | 6:05 p.m. | at No. 16 TCU | Amon G. Carter Stadium; Fort Worth, TX | CSS | L 24–27 | 28,927 | |
| October 25 | 12:00 p.m. | at No. 4 Georgia* | Sanford Stadium; Athens, GA | | L 13–16 | 92,058 | |
| November 1 | 3:00 p.m. | Army^{†} | Legion Field; Birmingham, AL | | W 24–9 | 22,020 | |
| November 8 | 3:00 p.m. | Tulane | Legion Field; Birmingham, AL | CSS | L 24–38 | 14,213 | |
| November 22 | 6:00 p.m. | at South Florida | Raymond James Stadium; Tampa, FL | CSS | W 22–19 | 30,216 | |
| November 29 | 4:00 p.m. | at Houston | Robertson Stadium; Houston, TX | | L 28–56 | 15,120 | |
*Non-conference game; ^{†}Homecoming; Rankings from AP Poll released prior to the game; All times are in Central time
