= 2003 Houston Cougars football team =

American college football season

2003 Houston Cougars football

Hawaii Bowl, L 48–54 vs. Hawaii
- Conference: Conference USA
- Record: 7–6 (4–4 C-USA)
- Head coach: Art Briles (1st season)
- Offensive scheme: Veer and shoot
- Defensive coordinator: Ron Harris (1st season)
- Base defense: 4–3
- Captain: Game captains
- Home stadium: Robertson Stadium

2003 Conference USA football standings
	Conf.			Overall
Team	W		L	W		L
Southern Miss $	8	–	0	9	–	4
No. 24 TCU	7	–	1	11	–	2
Memphis	5	–	3	9	–	4
Louisville	5	–	3	9	–	4
South Florida	5	–	3	7	–	4
Houston	4	–	4	7	–	6
UAB	4	–	4	5	–	7
Tulane	3	–	5	5	–	7
Cincinnati	2	–	6	5	–	7
East Carolina	1	–	7	1	–	11
Army	0	–	8	0	–	13
$ – Conference champion; Rankings from AP Poll

The 2003 Houston Cougars football team represented the University of Houston as a member of Conference USA (C-USA) during the 2003 NCAA Division I-A football season. Led by first-year head coach Art Briles, the Cougars compiled an overall record of 7–6 with a mark of 4–4 in conference play, tying for sixth place in C-USA. Houston was invited to the Hawaii Bowl, where the Cougars lost to Hawaii. The team played home games on campus, at Robertson Stadium in Houston.

== Schedule ==
Date	Time	Opponent	Site	TV	Result	Attendance	Source
August 30	7:00 pm	Rice*	Robertson Stadium; Houston, TX (rivalry)		W 48–14	25,355	
September 6	11:00 am	at No. 5 Michigan*	Michigan Stadium; Ann Arbor, MI	ESPN	L 3–50	109,580	
September 13	7:00 pm	at Louisiana–Lafayette*	Cajun Field; Lafayette, LA		W 21–14	11,127	
September 20	7:00 pm	Mississippi State*	Robertson Stadium; Houston, TX		W 42–35	26,233	
September 30	6:30 pm	at East Carolina	Dowdy–Ficklen Stadium; Greenville, NC	ESPN2	W 27–13	33,250	
October 11	1:30 pm	at Tulane	Tad Gormley Stadium; New Orleans, LA		W 45–42	27,420	
October 18	7:00 pm	Memphis	Robertson Stadium; Houston, TX		L 14–45	22,623	
October 25	7:00 pm	No. 15 TCU	Robertson Stadium; Houston, TX		L 55–62	21,136	
November 8	4:00 pm	Southern Miss^{†}	Robertson Stadium; Houston, TX		L 10–31	20,377	
November 15	12:00 pm	at Army	Michie Stadium; West Point, NY		W 34–14	31,638	
November 22	2:00 pm	at Louisville	Papa John's Cardinal Stadium; Louisville, KY		L 45–66	33,268	
November 29	4:00 pm	UAB	Robertson Stadium; Houston, TX		W 56–28	15,120	
December 25	7:00 pm	vs. Hawaii*	Aloha Stadium; Halawa, HI (Hawaii Bowl)	ESPN	L 48–54 ^{3OT}	25,551	
*Non-conference game; ^{†}Homecoming; Rankings from AP Poll released prior to the game; All times are in Central time

== Roster ==
2003 Houston Cougars football team roster
Players			Coaches
Offense: Pos. / # / Name / Class; QB / 10 / Kevin Kolb / Fr	Defense: Pos. / # / Name / Class	Special teams: Pos. / # / Name / Class	Head coach: Art Briles; Coordinators/assistant coaches: Dave Aranda (linebackers); Legend: (C) Team captain; (S) Suspended; (I) Ineligible; Injured; Redshirt; Roster
