= Christopher Vincent =

Christopher Vincent is the given names of:

- Christy Kinahan (born 1957; full name Christopher Vincent Kinahan), Irish suspected crime boss
- Chris Metzen (born 1973; full name Christopher Vincent Metzen), American game designer
- Christopher Vincent Stanich (1902–1987), New Zealand mariner

== See also ==
- Chris Vincent, disambiguation page
- Christian Vincent, a disambiguation page
- Christophe Vincent (born 1992), a French association football player
