= 2003 Arizona Wildcats football team =

American college football season

2003 Arizona Wildcats football
- Conference: Pacific-10
- Record: 2–10 (1–7 Pac-10)
- Head coach: John Mackovic (3rd season; first five games); Mike Hankwitz (interim; final seven games)
- Offensive coordinator: Mike Deal (1st season)
- Offensive scheme: Multiple
- Defensive coordinator: Mike Hankwitz (1st season)
- Base defense: 4–3
- Home stadium: Arizona Stadium

2003 Pacific-10 Conference football standings
	Conf.			Overall
Team	W		L	W		L
No. 1 USC $	7	–	1	12	–	1
No. 9 Washington State	6	–	2	10	–	3
Oregon	5	–	3	8	–	5
California	5	–	3	8	–	6
Oregon State	4	–	4	8	–	5
Washington	4	–	4	6	–	6
UCLA	4	–	4	6	–	7
Arizona State	2	–	6	5	–	7
Stanford	2	–	6	4	–	7
Arizona	1	–	7	2	–	10
$ – Conference champion; Rankings from AP Poll

The 2003 Arizona Wildcats football team represented the University of Arizona during the 2003 NCAA Division I-A football season. The team was coached by John Mackovic in his third season with the Wildcats. Arizona completed the season with a record of 2–10 (1–7 against Pac-10 opponents) and finished in last place in the Pac-10 standings.

After starting the year 1–4, Mackovic was fired and defensive coordinator Mike Hankwitz coached the team on an interim basis for the rest of the season.

== Schedule ==
Date	Time	Opponent	Site	TV	Result	Attendance
August 30	7:00 p.m.	UTEP*	Arizona Stadium; Tucson, AZ	FSNAZ	W 42–7	40,264
September 6	7:00 p.m.	No. 13 LSU*	Arizona Stadium; Tucson, AZ	TBS	L 13–59	46,110
September 13	7:00 p.m.	Oregon	Arizona Stadium; Tucson, AZ	TBS	L 10–48	40,462
September 20	10:00 a.m.	at No. 25 Purdue*	Ross–Ade Stadium; West Lafayette, IN	ESPN GamePlan	L 7–59	52,310
September 27	7:00 p.m.	No. 19 TCU*	Arizona Stadium; Tucson, AZ	FSNAZ	L 10–13 ^{OT}	40,515
October 4	2:00 p.m.	at No. 14 Washington State	Martin Stadium; Pullman, WA	FSN	L 7–30	34,923
October 11	4:00 p.m.	UCLA	Arizona Stadium; Tucson, AZ	FSN	L 21–24	44,481
October 25	12:30 p.m.	at California	California Memorial Stadium; Berkeley, CA	FSN	L 14–42	33,249
November 1	2:00 p.m.	at Oregon State	Reser Stadium; Corvallis, OR	FSN	L 23–52	36,168
November 8	4:00 p.m.	Washington^{†}	Arizona Stadium; Tucson, AZ	FSN	W 27–22	48,319
November 15	4:00 p.m.	No. 2 USC	Arizona Stadium; Tucson, AZ	TBS	L 0–45	39,201
November 28	1:00 p.m.	at Arizona State	Sun Devil Stadium; Tempe, AZ (Territorial Cup)	FSN	L 7–28	55,498
*Non-conference game; ^{†}Homecoming; Rankings from AP Poll released prior to the game; All times are in Mountain time

== Before the season ==
Arizona concluded the 2002 season with a 4–8 record, in yet another losing season under Mackovic. The last part of the season became a part of controversy that involved Mackovic mistreating players, which led to the team reporting to the school about the coach's behavior toward them. Mackovic would later apologize for his actions and promised to fix his mistakes.

During the offseason, Mackovic fired both of his coordinators to rebuild the program back to its winning ways. Several players on the team threatened to leave the roster or transfer to other schools unless Mackovic changed his attitude. Also, the Wildcats brought in a weak recruiting class, perhaps due to the Mackovic fallout. Fewer fans would attend the team's annual spring game in April as a result.

By the offseason, Mackovic would be placed on the hot seat and was favored by football analysts to be the first coach fired during the year, and that the Wildcats needed to win more games to save Mackovic's job. Arizona was picked to finish last in the Pac-10, as many believed that Arizona would not win more with Mackovic in charge.

== Game summaries ==
=== vs UTEP ===
UTEP Miners (0–0) vs Arizona Wildcats (0–0) – Game summary

Quarter	1	2	3	4	Total
Miners	0	0	0	7	7
Wildcats	21	14	7	0	42

at Arizona Stadium • Tucson, AZ

- Date: August 30, 2003
- Game time: 7:00 P.M.
- Game weather: Fair, 96 °F (36 °C)
- Game attendance: 40,264
- Referee: Jay Stricherz
- TV: Fox Sports Arizona

Game information

First quarter

- (13:51) ARIZ – Ricky Williams 41-yard pass from Nic Costa, Bobby Gill kick (Drive: 4 plays, 80 yards, 1:09; Arizona 7–0)
- (8:15) ARIZ – Nic Costa 1-yard run, Bobby Gill kick (Drive: 8 plays, 80 yards, 3:48; Arizona 14–0)
- (3:20) ARIZ – Clarence Farmer 8-yard run, Bobby Gill kick (Drive: 3 plays, 21 yards, 1:05; Arizona 21–0)

Second quarter

- (9:37) ARIZ – Lance Relford 79-yard pass from Ryan O'Hara, Bobby Gill kick (Drive: 3 plays, 83 yards, 1:03; Arizona 28–0)
- (0:54) ARIZ – Mike Bell 11-yard run, Bobby Gill kick (Drive: 4 plays, 38 yards, 1:17; Arizona 35–0)

Third quarter

- (10:45) ARIZ – Gilbert Harris 2-yard run, Bobby Gill kick (Drive: 8 plays, 95 yards, 3:09; Arizona 42–0)

Fourth quarter

- (14:49) UTEP – Joe Fleskoski 39-yard interception return, Keith Robinson kick (Arizona 42–7)

Statistics	UTEP	ARIZ
First downs	18	18
Total yards	275	446
Rushing yards	33–71	43–217
Passing yards	204	229
Passing: Comp–Att–Int	21–43–1	14–26–2
Time of possession	28:53	31:07

Team	Category	Player	Statistics
UTEP	Passing	Orlando Cruz	13/25, 121 yards, INT
UTEP	Rushing	Matt Austin	8 carries, 38 yards
UTEP	Receiving	Johnnie Lee Higgins Jr.	4 receptions, 43 yards
Arizona	Passing	Ryan O'Hara	8/16, 119 yards, TD, 2 INT
Arizona	Rushing	Mike Bell	13 carries, 119 yards, TD
Arizona	Receiving	Lance Relford	3 receptions, 88 yards, TD

Arizona opened the season by hosting UTEP. In their first meeting against the Miners since 1999, the Wildcats would dominate on all phases and cruised to a victory. UTEP's only score was an interception return early in the fourth quarter after Arizona brought in backup players with the game already out of reach. Also, the game featured Arizona Stadium having the smallest attendance for a home opener since 1997, as fewer fans attended as a result of a lack of interest due to Mackovic still being the Wildcats coach to start the season.

=== vs No. 13 LSU ===
No. 13 LSU Tigers (1–0) vs Arizona Wildcats (1–0) – Game summary

Quarter	1	2	3	4	Total
No. 13 Tigers	17	21	7	14	59
Wildcats	0	0	0	13	13

at Arizona Stadium • Tucson, AZ

- Date: September 6, 2003
- Game time: 7:00 P.M.
- Game weather: Cloudy, 83 °F (28 °C)
- Game attendance: 46,110
- Referee: Jack Wood
- TV: TBS

Game information

First quarter

- (8:35) LSU – Joseph Addai 1-yard run, Ryan Gaudet kick (Drive: 15 plays, 80 yards, 6:25; LSU 7–0)
- (5:21) LSU – Ryan Gaudet 47-yard field goal (Drive: 4 plays, 0 yards, 2:11; LSU 10–0)
- (4:23) LSU – Joseph Addai 8-yard run, Ryan Gaudet kick (Drive: 2 plays, 9 yards, 0:39; LSU 17–0)

Second quarter

- (13:52) LSU – Matt Mauck 4-yard run, Ryan Gaudet kick (Drive: 9 plays, 57 yards, 3:46; LSU 24–0)
- (9:32) LSU – Michael Clayton 48-yard pass from Matt Mauck, Ryan Gaudet kick (Drive: 5 plays, 80 yards, 2:11; LSU 31–0)
- (5:20) LSU – Devery Henderson 55-yard pass from Marcus Randall, Ryan Gaudet kick (Drive: 6 plays, 80 yards, 2:24; LSU 38–0)

Third quarter

- (10:41) LSU – Shyrone Carey 1-yard run, Chris Jackson kick (Drive: 5 plays, 38 yards, 1:57; LSU 45–0)

Fourth quarter

- (12:49) LSU – Justin Vincent 1-yard run, Chris Jackson kick (Drive: 9 plays, 65 yards, 2:49; LSU 52–0)
- (10:42) ARIZ – Zeonte Sherman 1-yard fumble return, Bobby Gill kick (LSU 52–7)
- (5:40) LSU – Skyler Green 62-yard punt return, Chris Jackson kick (LSU 59–7)
- (4:01) ARIZ – Clarence Farmer 11-yard run, kick failed (Drive: 6 plays, 45 yards, 1:33; LSU 59–13)

Statistics	LSU	ARIZ
First downs	28	10
Total yards	481	182
Rushing yards	56–182	27–91
Passing yards	299	91
Passing: Comp–Att–Int	19–25–1	10–32–2
Time of possession	36:13	23:47

Team	Category	Player	Statistics
LSU	Passing	Marcus Randall	10/15, 162 yards, TD, INT
LSU	Rushing	Joseph Addai	18 carries, 86 yards, 2 TD
LSU	Receiving	Michael Clayton	6 receptions, 109 yards, TD
Arizona	Passing	Ryan O'Hara	7/20, 70 yards, INT
Arizona	Rushing	Clarence Farmer	8 carries, 61 yards, TD
Arizona	Receiving	Sean Jones	3 receptions, 27 yards

The Wildcats hosted LSU in their next game in the first meeting between the two since 1984. Unfortunately for Arizona, the 13th-ranked Tigers would score early and would break the game open by halftime with a 38–0 lead as Arizona's fans began to head for the exits. The Wildcats would finally score in the fourth quarter to break up a shutout bid, but their big halftime deficit would be too much for them and their record evened to 1–1. Fans chanted for Mackovic to be fired near the end of the game, as they wanted the team to move on from the embattled coach.

=== vs Oregon ===
Oregon Ducks (2–0) vs Arizona Wildcats (1–1) – Game summary

Quarter	1	2	3	4	Total
Ducks	6	14	21	7	48
Wildcats	0	0	3	7	10

at Arizona Stadium • Tucson, AZ

- Date: September 13, 2003
- Game time: 7:00 P.M.
- Game weather: Clear, 90 °F (32 °C)
- Game attendance: 40,462
- Referee: David Cutaia
- TV: TBS

Game information

First quarter

- (9:42) ORE – Jared Siegel 29-yard field goal (Drive: 4 plays, 7 yards, 0:51; Oregon 3–0)
- (1:24) ORE – Jared Siegel 22-yard field goal (Drive: 13 plays, 66 yards, 3:51; Oregon 6–0)

Second quarter

- (8:56) ORE – Jason Fife 5-yard run, Jared Siegel kick (Drive: 12 plays, 51 yards, 5:17; Oregon 13–0)
- (1:02) ORE – Demetrius Williams 3-yard pass from Kellen Clemens, Jared Siegel kick (Drive: 9 plays, 48 yards, 4:03; Oregon 20–0)

Third quarter

- (11:20) ARIZ – Bobby Gill 44-yard field goal (Drive: 11 plays, 53 yards, 3:40; Oregon 20–3)
- (8:00) ORE – Demetrius Williams 65-yard pass from Kellen Clemens, Jared Siegel kick (Drive: 6 plays, 87 yards, 3:15; Oregon 27–3)
- (5:43) ORE – Kenny Washington 1-yard run, Jared Siegel kick (Drive: 4 plays, 39 yards, 1:13; Oregon 34–3)
- (2:43) ORE – Demetrius Williams 30-yard pass from Jason Fife, Jared Siegel kick (Drive: 5 plays, 49 yards, 1:46; Oregon 41–3)

Fourth quarter

- (11:47) ORE – Ryan Shaw 7-yard pass from Jason Fife, Jared Siegel kick (Drive: 13 plays, 62 yards, 3:57; Oregon 48–3)
- (3:42) ARIZ – Biren Ealy 53-yard pass from Ryan O'Hara, Bobby Gill kick (Drive: 10 plays, 97 yards, 4:14; Oregon 48–10)

Statistics	ORE	ARIZ
First downs	26	11
Total yards	493	180
Rushing yards	56–210	25–34
Passing yards	283	146
Passing: Comp–Att–Int	22–32–0	16–36–0
Time of possession	34:23	25:37

Team	Category	Player	Statistics
Oregon	Passing	Kellen Clemens	11/17, 168 yards, 2 TD
Oregon	Rushing	Chris Vincent	21 carries, 77 yards
Oregon	Receiving	Demetrius Williams	5 receptions, 139 yards, 3 TD
Arizona	Passing	Ryan O'Hara	11/27, 113 yards, TD
Arizona	Rushing	Clarence Farmer	11 carries, 42 yards
Arizona	Receiving	Biren Ealy	7 receptions, 90 yards, TD

Arizona opened Pac-10 play against Oregon. It was the third consecutive year that the Wildcats played a home game against the Ducks.

Hours before the game started, a plane with a banner that read “Hey U of A, Please Fire Mackovic” flew over the Arizona campus, as many in the Tucson community beyond Wildcat fans demanded that Mackovic be fired as coach and have the program be in a new direction.

In the game, the Wildcats would again struggle as the Ducks would dominate on both sides of the ball as Arizona was blown out again. Chants of “Fire Mackovic” would ring through the Arizona student section in the game's final minutes.

After the game, Mackovic, angry after another blowout loss, would lose his temper and trashed his office after ending postgame interviews.

=== at No. 25 Purdue ===
Arizona Wildcats (1–2) at No. 25 Purdue Boilermakers (1–1) – Game summary

Quarter	1	2	3	4	Total
Wildcats	0	0	7	0	7
No. 25 Boilermakers	7	17	14	21	59

at Ross-Ade Stadium • West Lafayette, IN

- Date: September 20, 2003
- Game time: 10:00 A.M.
- Game weather: Fair, 66 °F (19 °C)
- Game attendance: 52,310
- Referee: Dennis Lipski
- TV: ESPN GamePlan

Game information

First quarter

- (12:19) PUR – Ray Williams 35-yard pass from Kyle Orton, Ben Jones kick (Drive: 8 plays, 72 yards, 2:41; Purdue 7–0)

Second quarter

- (10:06) PUR – Jerod Void 2-yard run, Ben Jones kick (Drive: 5 plays, 21 yards, 2:04; Purdue 14–0)
- (2:18) PUR – Ben Jones 27-yard field goal (Drive: 9 plays, 36 yards, 3:45; Purdue 17–0)
- (0:40) PUR – John Standeford 81-yard pass from Kyle Orton, Ben Jones kick (Drive: 1 play, 81 yards, 0:13; Purdue 24–0)

Third quarter

- (13:33) PUR – Jerod Void 13-yard run, Ben Jones kick (Drive: 2 plays, 22 yards, 0:31; Purdue 31–0)
- (11:03) PUR – Brandon Jones 43-yard pass from Kyle Orton, Ben Jones kick (Drive: 3 plays, 69 yards, 1:18; Purdue 38–0)
- (4:09) ARIZ – Biren Ealy 36-yard pass from Kris Heavner, Bobby Gill kick (Drive: 5 plays, 47 yards, 1:25; Purdue 38–7)

Fourth quarter

- (12:30) PUR – Kyle Ingraham 8-yard pass from Brandon Kirsch, Ben Jones kick (Drive: 5 plays, 43 yards, 1:59; Purdue 45–7)
- (8:51) PUR – Jerome Brooks 2-yard run, Ben Jones kick (Drive: 8 plays, 71 yards, 2:33; Purdue 52–7)
- (4:07) PUR – Jerome Brooks 29-yard run, Ben Jones kick (Drive: 3 plays, 58 yards, 1:11; Purdue 59–7)

Statistics	ARIZ	PUR
First downs	12	28
Total yards	174	580
Rushing yards	31–66	52–292
Passing yards	108	288
Passing: Comp–Att–Int	13–31–2	19–31–1
Time of possession	25:16	34:44

Team	Category	Player	Statistics
Arizona	Passing	Kris Heavner	5/12, 55 yards, TD, INT
Arizona	Rushing	Nic Costa	3 carries, 47 yards
Arizona	Receiving	Biren Ealy	7 receptions, 84 yards, TD
Purdue	Passing	Kyle Orton	16/28, 261 yards, 3 TD, INT
Purdue	Rushing	Jerome Brooks	21 carries, 122 yards, 2 TD
Purdue	Receiving	John Standeford	4 receptions, 111 yards, TD

Arizona went on the road for the first time in the season by traveling to Purdue. It was the very first meeting between the two teams. The Boilermakers would be too much for the Wildcats in yet another blowout loss for Arizona. It was the third straight game that Arizona gave up over 40 points to its opponents.

Mackovic, still frustrated after yet another blowout loss, would have another postgame meltdown in the locker room, as he would toss footballs against lockers that nearly hit players as well as yelling obscenities and insulting them. He also threw a Gatorade cooler, a trash can, and a chair against the wall. The players would report the incidents to the university as well as their families who then became angered with Mackovic. The Pac-10 would later reprimand him for his actions and he apologized to the players, the university, and fans. The issues surrounding Mackovic and the team's losses would become speculation that the Wildcats would soon make a coaching change.

=== vs No. 19 TCU ===
No. 19 TCU Horned Frogs (3–0) vs Arizona Wildcats (1–3) – Game summary

Quarter	1	2	3	4	OT	Total
No. 19 Horned Frogs	0	7	0	3	3	13
Wildcats	0	0	7	3	0	10

at Arizona Stadium • Tucson, AZ

- Date: September 27, 2003
- Game time: 7:00 P.M.
- Game weather: Fair, 86 °F (30 °C)
- Game attendance: 40,515
- Referee: Larry Farina
- TV: Fox Sports Arizona

Game information

First quarter

- No scoring plays

Second quarter

- (2:44) TCU – Reggie Harrell 98-yard pass from Brandon Hassell, Nick Browne kick (Drive: 1 play, 98 yards, 0:13; TCU 7–0)

Third quarter

- (9:40) ARIZ – Steve Fleming 58-yard pass from Kris Heavner, Bobby Gill kick (Drive: 1 play, 58 yards, 0:10; Tied 7–7)

Fourth quarter

- (10:11) ARIZ – Bobby Gill 30-yard field goal (Drive: 7 plays, 48 yards, 3:06; Arizona 10–7)
- (1:07) TCU – Nick Browne 24-yard field goal (Drive: 13 plays, 68 yards, 4:43; Tied 10–10)

Overtime

- TCU – Nick Browne 33-yard field goal (Drive: 4 plays, 9 yards; TCU 13–10)

Statistics	TCU	ARIZ
First downs	19	10
Total yards	452	309
Rushing yards	56–206	29–33
Passing yards	246	276
Passing: Comp–Att–Int	12–24–0	14–30–4
Time of possession	35:03	24:57

Team	Category	Player	Statistics
TCU	Passing	Brandon Hassell	12/24, 246 yards, TD
TCU	Rushing	Robert Merrill	31 carries, 148 yards
TCU	Receiving	Reggie Harrell	4 receptions, 127 yards, TD
Arizona	Passing	Kris Heavner	14/29, 276 yards, TD, 3 INT
Arizona	Rushing	Clarence Farmer	13 carries, 32 yards
Arizona	Receiving	Ricky Williams	5 receptions, 131 yards

Arizona went back home and faced TCU in a rematch of the teams’ meeting from 1999 (when Arizona came back to win that game). Both teams would rely on defense which led to a low scoring game. The Wildcats led 10–7 in the fourth quarter before the Horned Frogs forced overtime with a field goal. In the first overtime period, Arizona would commit a turnover with an interception which gave the Frogs a chance at the win. TCU would convert on a field goal to win it 13-10 and handed the Wildcats yet another loss as fans chanted “Fire Mackovic” one last time. Both teams have not met since.

==== Mackovic’s firing ====
The day after Arizona's loss to TCU, Mackovic was fired as coach and that Hankwitz, the team's defensive coordinator, would take over as interim coach for the remainder of the season. Mackovic finished his Arizona tenure with a 10–18 record, and was 3–14 against Pac-10 foes.

In a press conference, Arizona announced that Mackovic's dismissal was due to the following reasons:

- Wins and losses, especially those against ranked opponents as well as Pac-10 teams
- A poor relationship with players and fans
- The inability to build a winning culture for the program and make bowl game appearances
- Failure to meet expectations by contending for a Rose Bowl
- Weak recruiting, especially before the season as the team was ranked near the bottom of the Pac-10 in terms of player commitments
- The controversies from both the previous season and this one as a result of abusing and insulting players, including the postgame locker room meltdown after the loss to Purdue
- The failure to win Pac-10 games at home and having losing streaks during the two-and-a-half-season span

At the time, the Wildcats were outscored in their losses, 179–40 after their win over UTEP in the season opener. During the losses, fans chanted for Mackovic to be fired and fans held signs that referenced his firing, including one that had his name in front of a fire blaze and another with the Terminator saying “Hey Mackovic, You Are Terminated!” (likely as a reference to the third Terminator film being released in the summer prior to the start of the season), and rejoiced after hearing the news of him being fired. When Mackovic was seen leaving the Arizona campus, a group of fans chanted “You’ve been fired” at him and sang “Na na, hey hey, goodbye” and “Hit the Road, Jack” as he departed the campus for good.

Hankwitz, who was previously on the Arizona coaching staff in the 1970s along with Mackovic under former coach Jim Young, was formerly the defensive coordinator at Texas A&M before being hired at Arizona this season. He would take over the program and attempted to fix the team's problems caused by Mackovic and promised to bring the team back to its winning ways.

=== at No. 14 Washington State ===
Arizona Wildcats (1–4) at No. 14 Washington State Cougars (4–1) – Game summary

Quarter	1	2	3	4	Total
Wildcats	0	0	7	0	7
No. 14 Cougars	13	0	3	14	30

at Martin Stadium • Pullman, WA

- Date: October 4, 2003
- Game time: 2:00 P.M.
- Game weather: Sunny, 86 °F (30 °C)
- Game attendance: 34,923
- Referee: Gordon Riese
- TV: Fox Sports Arizona

Game information

First quarter

- (9:39) WSU – Drew Dunning 22-yard field goal (Drive: 8 plays, 66 yards, 2:50; Washington State 3–0)
- (5:59) WSU – Devard Darling 84-yard pass from Matt Kegel, Drew Dunning kick (Drive: 3 plays, 87 yards, 1:00; Washington State 10–0)
- (0:00) WSU – Drew Dunning 38-yard field goal (Drive: 10 plays, 37 yards, 4:15; Washington State 13–0)

Second quarter

- No scoring plays

Third quarter

- (9:38) ARIZ – Matt Padron 5-yard pass from Nic Costa, Bobby Gill kick (Drive: 7 plays, 68 yards, 2:30; Washington State 13–7)
- (1:26) WSU – Drew Dunning 23-yard field goal (Drive: 11 plays, 65 yards, 4:41; Washington State 16–7)

Fourth quarter

- (9:02) WSU – Jason David 34-yard interception return, Drew Dunning kick (Washington State 23–7)
- (7:38) WSU – Jonathan Smith 11-yard pass from Matt Kegel, Drew Dunning kick (Drive: 3 plays, 19 yards, 1:16; Washington State 30–7)

Statistics	ARIZ	WSU
First downs	9	24
Total yards	198	513
Rushing yards	21–65	42–161
Passing yards	133	352
Passing: Comp–Att–Int	19–36–1	22–37–1
Time of possession	26:19	33:41

Team	Category	Player	Statistics
Arizona	Passing	Kris Heavner	18/35, 128 yards, INT
Arizona	Rushing	Mike Bell	10 carries, 40 yards
Arizona	Receiving	Lance Relford	4 receptions, 39 yards
Washington State	Passing	Matt Kegel	18/32, 315 yards, 2 TD, INT
Washington State	Rushing	Jonathan Smith	20 carries, 83 yards
Washington State	Receiving	Devard Darling	2 receptions, 98 yards, TD

The Wildcats visited Washington State in their first game after Mackovic was fired. Under Hankwitz, Arizona would keep close with the Cougars, but their offense continued to struggle and would lose again.

=== vs UCLA ===
UCLA Bruins (3–2) vs Arizona Wildcats (1–5) – Game summary

Quarter	1	2	3	4	Total
Bruins	3	7	7	7	24
Wildcats	7	14	0	0	21

at Arizona Stadium • Tucson, AZ

- Date: October 11, 2003
- Game time: 4:00 P.M.
- Game weather: Mostly clear, 85 °F (29 °C)
- Game attendance: 44,481
- Referee: Jack Folliard
- TV: Fox Sports Arizona

Game information

First quarter

- (12:24) ARIZ – Matt Padron 7-yard pass from Nic Costa, Bobby Gill kick (Drive: 6 plays, 80 yards, 2:36; Arizona 7–0)
- (1:30) UCLA – Justin Medlock 32-yard field goal (Drive: 4 plays, 3 yards, 1:26; Arizona 7–3)

Second quarter

- (10:02) UCLA – Tyler Ebell 18-yard run, Justin Medlock kick (Drive: 5 plays, 73 yards, 1:40; UCLA 10–7)
- (6:43) ARIZ – Clarence Farmer 1-yard pass from Nic Costa, Bobby Gill kick (Drive: 8 plays, 83 yards, 3:12; Arizona 14–10)
- (0:29) ARIZ – Biren Ealy 39-yard pass from Kris Heavner, Nick Folk kick (Drive: 2 plays, 40 yards, 0:38; Arizona 21–10)

Third quarter

- (11:17) UCLA – Manuel White 5-yard run, Justin Medlock kick (Drive: 10 plays, 80 yards, 3:43; Arizona 21–17)

Fourth quarter

- (13:41) UCLA – Rodney Leisle 55-yard interception return, Justin Medlock kick (UCLA 24–17)

Statistics	UCLA	ARIZ
First downs	16	21
Total yards	333	519
Rushing yards	34–103	42–276
Passing yards	230	243
Passing: Comp–Att–Int	19–30–2	17–31–4
Time of possession	28:44	31:16

Team	Category	Player	Statistics
UCLA	Passing	Drew Olson	15/22, 189 yards, INT
UCLA	Rushing	Tyler Ebell	14 carries, 61 yards, TD
UCLA	Receiving	Craig Bragg	6 receptions, 105 yards
Arizona	Passing	Kris Heavner	13/20, 187 yards, TD, 3 INT
Arizona	Rushing	Clarence Farmer	25 carries, 122 yards
Arizona	Receiving	Biren Ealy	5 receptions, 100 yards, TD

However, the Bruins got back in the game and a fourth-quarter interception return touchdown gave them the lead. Arizona tried to respond, but committed crucial mistakes, including a missed field goal in the final few minutes, that would ultimately cost them and UCLA gave the Wildcats yet another tough defeat and Arizona dropped to 1–6.

=== at California ===
Arizona Wildcats (1–6) at California Golden Bears (3–5) – Game summary

Quarter	1	2	3	4	Total
Wildcats	0	0	7	7	14
Golden Bears	0	21	7	14	42

at California Memorial Stadium • Berkeley, CA

- Date: October 25, 2003
- Game time: 12:30 P.M.
- Game weather: Clear, 80 °F (27 °C)
- Game attendance: 33,249
- Referee: Jack Wood
- TV: Fox Sports Arizona

Game information

First quarter

- No scoring plays

Second quarter

- (14:14) CAL – JJ Arrington 1-yard run, Tyler Fredrickson kick (Drive: 10 plays, 44 yards, 4:59; California 7–0)
- (7:20) CAL – Adimchinobe Echemandu 1-yard run, Tyler Fredrickson kick (Drive: 4 plays, 46 yards, 2:10; California 14–0)
- (3:30) CAL – Adimchinobe Echemandu 49-yard run, Tyler Fredrickson kick (Drive: 3 plays, 67 yards, 0:35; California 21–0)

Third quarter

- (12:43) ARIZ – Steve Fleming 3-yard pass from Kris Heavner, Bobby Gill kick (Drive: 6 plays, 65 yards, 2:17; California 21–7)
- (4:12) CAL – Adimchinobe Echemandu 6-yard run, Tyler Fredrickson kick (Drive: 9 plays, 71 yards, 3:19; California 28–7)

Fourth quarter

- (14:16) CAL – JJ Arrington 45-yard run, Tyler Fredrickson kick (Drive: 4 plays, 80 yards, 1:22; California 35–7)
- (8:04) CAL – Reggie Robertson 1-yard run, Tyler Fredrickson kick (Drive: 9 plays, 42 yards, 5:13; California 42–7)
- (5:37) ARIZ – Mike Bell 49-yard run, Bobby Gill kick (Drive: 5 plays, 80 yards, 2:27; California 42–14)

Statistics	ARIZ	CAL
First downs	19	25
Total yards	402	444
Rushing yards	28–201	59–327
Passing yards	201	117
Passing: Comp–Att–Int	18–34–2	11–18–0
Time of possession	24:12	35:48

Team	Category	Player	Statistics
Arizona	Passing	Kris Heavner	17/31, 186 yards, TD, INT
Arizona	Rushing	Mike Bell	19 carries, 182 yards, TD
Arizona	Receiving	Ricky Williams	6 receptions, 79 yards
California	Passing	Aaron Rodgers	9/16, 93 yards
California	Rushing	Adimchinobe Echemandu	30 carries, 201 yards, 3 TD
California	Receiving	Geoff McArthur	4 receptions, 54 yards

=== at Oregon State ===
Arizona Wildcats (1–7) at Oregon State Beavers (5–3) – Game summary

Quarter	1	2	3	4	Total
Wildcats	0	0	9	14	23
Beavers	7	28	17	0	52

at Reser Stadium • Corvallis, OR

- Date: November 1, 2003
- Game time: 2:00 P.M.
- Game weather: Fair, 45 °F (7 °C)
- Game attendance: 36,178
- Referee: David Cutaia
- TV: Fox Sports Arizona

Game information

First quarter

- (3:56) OSU – Steven Jackson 10-yard pass from Derek Anderson, Kirk Yliniemi kick (Drive: 10 plays, 78 yards, 4:27; Oregon State 7–0)

Second quarter

- (13:49) OSU – Steven Jackson 2-yard run, Kirk Yliniemi kick (Drive: 10 plays, 75 yards, 3:36; Oregon State 14–0)
- (12:39) OSU – Steven Jackson 2-yard run, Kirk Yliniemi kick (Drive: 1 play, 2 yards, 0:03; Oregon State 21–0)
- (9:00) OSU – James Newson 24-yard pass from Derek Anderson, Kirk Yliniemi kick (Drive: 4 plays, 50 yards, 1:09; Oregon State 28–0)
- (0:58) OSU – Mike Hass 4-yard pass from Derek Anderson, Kirk Yliniemi kick (Drive: 8 plays, 63 yards, 3:30; Oregon State 35–0)

Third quarter

- (12:00) OSU – Kirk Yliniemi 54-yard field goal (Drive: 4 plays, 5 yards, 1:21; Oregon State 38–0)
- (9:43) OSU – Tim Euhus 1-yard pass from Derek Anderson, Kirk Yliniemi kick (Drive: 7 plays, 68 yards, 1:09; Oregon State 45–0)
- (7:32) ARIZ – Mike Bell 10-yard run, Nick Folk kick (Drive: 5 plays, 69 yards, 2:03; Oregon State 45–7)
- (5:05) OSU – Steven Jackson 1-yard run, Kirk Yliniemi kick (Drive: 7 plays, 50 yards, 2:27; Oregon State 52–7)
- (2:16) ARIZ – Team safety (Oregon State 52–9)

Fourth quarter

- (3:33) ARIZ – Ricky Williams 27-yard pass from Kris Heavner, Nick Folk kick (Drive: 3 plays, 48 yards, 1:45; Oregon State 52–16)
- (0:55) ARIZ – Mike Jefferson 9-yard pass from Kris Heavner, Nick Folk kick (Drive: 4 plays, 17 yards, 1:08; Oregon State 52–23)

Statistics	ARIZ	OSU
First downs	14	26
Total yards	232	426
Rushing yards	36–90	44–93
Passing yards	142	333
Passing: Comp–Att–Int	13–31–1	23–40–1
Time of possession	28:19	31:41

Team	Category	Player	Statistics
Arizona	Passing	Kris Heavner	12/28, 137 yards, 2 TD, INT
Arizona	Rushing	Mike Bell	25 carries, 106 yards, TD
Arizona	Receiving	Ricky Williams	5 receptions, 65 yards, TD
Oregon State	Passing	Derek Anderson	21/32, 308 yards, 4 TD
Oregon State	Rushing	Steven Jackson	28 carries, 107 yards, 3 TD
Oregon State	Receiving	James Newson	7 receptions, 100 yards, TD

=== vs Washington ===
Washington Huskies (5–4) vs Arizona Wildcats (1–8) – Game summary

Quarter	1	2	3	4	Total
Huskies	7	7	0	8	22
Wildcats	6	7	0	14	27

at Arizona Stadium • Tucson, AZ

- Date: November 8, 2003
- Game time: 4:00 P.M.
- Game weather: Sunny, Clear, 77 °F (25 °C)
- Game attendance: 48,319
- Referee: Jack Folliard
- TV: Fox Sports Arizona

Game information

First quarter

- (6:02) WASH – Adam Seery 3-yard pass from Cody Pickett, Evan Knudson kick (Drive: 12 plays, 88 yards, 4:08; Washington 7–0)
- (4:05) ARIZ – Mike Bell 67-yard run, two-point pass failed (Drive: 5 plays, 82 yards, 1:51; Washington 7–6)

Second quarter

- (13:13) WASH – Shelton Sampson 1-yard run, Evan Knudson kick (Drive: 6 plays, 22 yards, 2:24; Washington 14–6)
- (0:26) ARIZ – Biren Ealy 10-yard pass from Kris Heavner, Nick Folk kick (Drive: 5 plays, 50 yards, 0:58; Washington 14–13)

Third quarter

- No scoring plays

Fourth quarter

- (9:58) WASH – Team safety (Washington 16–13)
- (7:28) ARIZ – Mike Bell 69-yard run, Nick Folk kick (Drive: 3 plays, 78 yards, 1:42; Arizona 20–16)
- (4:38) ARIZ – Mike Bell 37-yard run, Nick Folk kick (Drive: 3 plays, 52 yards, 0:59; Arizona 27–16)
- (3:49) WASH – Corey Williams 4-yard pass from Cody Pickett, two-point run failed (Drive: 4 plays, 77 yards, 0:40; Arizona 27–22)

Statistics	WASH	ARIZ
First downs	24	11
Total yards	452	401
Rushing yards	35–101	37–250
Passing yards	351	151
Passing: Comp–Att–Int	31–51–0	11–26–1
Time of possession	32:58	27:02

Team	Category	Player	Statistics
Washington	Passing	Cody Pickett	31/51, 351 yards, 2 TD
Washington	Rushing	Kenny James	16 carries, 77 yards
Washington	Receiving	Reggie Williams	13 receptions, 121 yards
Arizona	Passing	Kris Heavner	10/20, 151 yards, TD, INT
Arizona	Rushing	Mike Bell	26 carries, 222 yards, 3 TD
Arizona	Receiving	Ricky Williams	2 receptions, 55 yards

On homecoming weekend, the Wildcats hosted Washington and looked to end their losing streak, which was now at eight games. Arizona would hang with the Huskies early on, and by the fourth quarter, the Wildcats took control a pair of long rushing touchdowns. Washington would answer to cut into Arizona's lead and was poised to take the lead late, but would be stopped by the Wildcats on a fourth down play, and Arizona held on to win. As time ran out, Arizona fans rushed the field and celebrated as the Wildcats finally broke their losing skid and won for the first time in the post-Mackovic era.

The win was Arizona's first win over the Huskies since 1998 after a string of near-misses against them and the first time that the Wildcats defeated them at home since their memorable upset in 1992. Also, it was Hankwitz's first win as coach and Arizona's first Pac-10 home win since 2000 (when they defeated the Huskies’ rival Washington State in what turned out to be Dick Tomey’s final victory as Wildcat coach), as well as their first conference win of the season. In addition, it was Arizona’s first home win in November since 1998, when they defeated rival Arizona State that year.

A memorable moment occurred late in the game, after Wildcats stopped the Huskies on their final possession. Half of the Arizona student section chanted “Where is Mackovic?” and the other half responded with “He got fired!”, which referenced the fact that they didn't have to deal with the Wildcats blowing another late lead against the Huskies, which happened twice under Mackovic when they played in Seattle in his first two years (as well as 2000 in Tomey's last year). Now that Mackovic was no longer coach and Arizona finally winning, it led to the chants before having new chants of “U of A” when the Wildcats ran out the clock.

=== vs No. 2 USC ===
No. 2 USC Trojans (8–1) vs Arizona Wildcats (2–8) – Game summary

Quarter	1	2	3	4	Total
No. 2 Trojans	14	21	10	0	45
Wildcats	0	0	0	0	0

at Arizona Stadium • Tucson, AZ

- Date: November 15, 2003
- Game time: 4:00 P.M.
- Game weather: Clear, 66 °F (19 °C)
- Game attendance: 39,201
- Referee: Gordon Riese
- TV: TBS

Game information

First quarter

- (11:59) USC – LenDale White 1-yard run, Ryan Killeen kick (Drive: 6 plays, 59 yards, 2:04; USC 7–0)
- (7:38) USC – Mike Williams 10-yard pass from Matt Leinart, Ryan Killeen kick (Drive: 7 plays, 64 yards, 2:50; USC 14–0)

Second quarter

- (10:09) USC – Mike Williams 10-yard pass from Matt Leinart, Ryan Killeen kick (Drive: 5 plays, 81 yards, 1:55; USC 21–0)
- (4:42) USC – Mike Williams 10-yard pass from Matt Leinart, Ryan Killeen kick (Drive: 3 plays, 26 yards, 0:54; USC 28–0)
- (2:59) USC – Gregg Guenther Jr. 10-yard pass from Matt Leinart, Ryan Killeen kick (Drive: 2 plays, 32 yards, 0:15; USC 35–0)

Third quarter

- (1:03) USC – Ryan Killeen 32-yard field goal (Drive: 5 plays, 37 yards, 1:40; USC 38–0)
- (0:00) USC – LenDale White 4-yard run, Ryan Killeen kick (Drive: 1 play, 43 yards, 0:02; USC 45–0)

Fourth quarter

- No scoring plays

Statistics	USC	ARIZ
First downs	32	10
Total yards	587	195
Rushing yards	48–220	26–50
Passing yards	367	145
Passing: Comp–Att–Int	26–37–0	12–34–3
Time of possession	35:42	24:18

Team	Category	Player	Statistics
USC	Passing	Matt Leinart	22/30, 296 yards, 4 TD
USC	Rushing	LenDale White	15 carries, 90 yards, 2 TD
USC	Receiving	Mike Williams	11 receptions, 157 yards, 3 TD
Arizona	Passing	Kris Heavner	11/30, 129 yards, 3 INT
Arizona	Rushing	Sean Jones	6 carries, 25 yards
Arizona	Receiving	Ricky Williams	4 receptions, 47 yards

After defeating Washington, Arizona faced second-ranked USC in a very tough test. Unfortunately for the Wildcats, they would have no chance as the Trojans showed why they were championship contenders by dominating Arizona from start to finish for a shutout victory. By halftime, the stadium would become half empty as most of the Arizona fans headed for the exits as USC had broken the game open. It was the first time that an opponent shut out Arizona since 1991, when the Wildcats were blanked at Washington.

Near the end of the game, Arizona fans chanted “We’ve got basketball”, as they gave up on football season (despite the Wildcats having one final game against Arizona State), and turned their attention to basketball, as it been usually with that program winning.

=== at Arizona State ===
Arizona Wildcats (2–9) at Arizona State Sun Devils (4–7) – Game summary

Quarter	1	2	3	4	Total
Wildcats	7	0	0	0	7
Sun Devils	7	14	0	7	28

at Sun Devil Stadium • Tempe, AZ

- Date: November 28, 2003
- Game time: 1:00 P.M.
- Game weather: Mostly Cloudy, 66 °F (19 °C)
- Game attendance: 55,498
- Referee: David Cutaia
- TV: Fox Sports Arizona

Game information

First quarter

- (12:22) ASU – Skyler Fulton 28-yard pass from Andrew Walter, Jesse Ainsworth kick (Drive: 7 plays, 80 yards, 2:38; Arizona State 7–0)
- (5:03) ARIZ – Mike Jefferson 16-yard pass from Kris Heavner, Nick Folk kick (Drive: 15 plays, 76 yards, 7:19; Tied 7–7)

Second quarter

- (3:10) ASU – Jamaal Lewis 9-yard pass from Andrew Walter, Jesse Ainsworth kick (Drive: 12 plays, 95 yards, 5:00; Arizona State 14–7)
- (1:34) ASU – Loren Wade 40-yard run, Jesse Ainsworth kick (Drive: 3 plays, 48 yards, 0:23; Arizona State 21–7)

Third quarter

- No scoring plays

Fourth quarter

- (13:58) ASU – Derek Hagan 80-yard pass from Andrew Walter, Jesse Ainsworth kick (Drive: 1 play, 80 yards, 0:13; Arizona State 28–7)

Statistics	ARIZ	ASU
First downs	24	18
Total yards	452	484
Rushing yards	35–113	37–203
Passing yards	339	281
Passing: Comp–Att–Int	28–48–1	16–26–0
Time of possession	34:54	25:06

Team	Category	Player	Statistics
Arizona	Passing	Kris Heavner	21/32, 252 yards, TD, INT
Arizona	Rushing	Mike Bell	25 carries, 95 yards
Arizona	Receiving	Mike Jefferson	9 receptions, 115 yards, TD
Arizona State	Passing	Andrew Walter	16/26, 281 yards, 3 TD
Arizona State	Rushing	Loren Wade	18 carries, 120 yards, TD
Arizona State	Receiving	Derek Hagan	8 receptions, 155 yards, TD

The Wildcats attempted to end the season on a high note, as they traveled to Tempe for the annual rivalry game against Arizona State. However, Arizona would have trouble slowing down ASU's passing offense and made mistakes that would cost them points. In the end, the Wildcats were held to only seven points, which was their lowest in the rivalry since 1992 and lost their tenth game of the season, which was a school record. Also, the loss put the Wildcats into finishing the season last (10th place) in the Pac-10 standings with a 2–10 record.

== Awards and honors ==
- Mike Bell, RB, Second-team All-Pac-10

== Season notes ==
- The season is among the worst in Arizona history and the ten losses were the most in a single season for the Wildcats until it was broken in 2021 when Arizona would lose eleven games in that season. Fans have blamed the losses due to Mackovic's issues and the team's poor play, including turnovers, penalties, player inexperience, and a bad defense. Also, the team's offensive performance earlier in the season as well as missed field goals were factors in the losing record.
- Many players would lose interest in football after Mackovic's troubles and fans gave up their season tickets after the team's losses during the year, although the fans considered to not attend games after Mackovic's troubles late in the 2002 season.
- The early part of the season was best known for Arizona fans using chants that called for Mackovic to be fired before the ending of the Wildcats’ blowout losses, and made references to the basketball team in the home finale late in the season against USC.
- The Wildcats would not play twelve games in a season again until 2006.
- Arizona and UTEP would not meet each other again until 2017.
- Arizona lost to the two teams that would eventually share the national championship this season (LSU and USC).
- The game against Purdue was only broadcast on pay-per-view in the Arizona market as part of the now-defunct ESPN GamePlan, as national broadcasters believed that Arizona would not have a chance at a win and because of the issues surrounding Mackovic at the time.
- Arizona would not play another overtime game until 2009.
- The Wildcats would not lose another home game against UCLA until 2013.
- Arizona scored a touchdown against Oregon State for the first time since 1999, as they only scored on field goals from 2000 to 2002.
- The victory over Washington was Hankwitz's first and only win as a coach.
- The game against USC was the only home game of the season that had an attendance below 40,000, like due to the fact that the Wildcats were never expected to win against the Trojans and that most of the Arizona fans were focused on basketball.
- Arizona played three games that were aired on TBS, with all being blowout losses. Fans believed that TBS would not broadcast another Arizona game again as a result of the losses, though the network would air one Arizona game in 2005 and 2006.
- The Wildcats only scored seven points against Arizona State, which would be the fewest for Arizona in the rivalry until 2020 when they would also be held to seven points in an ugly loss.
- Arizona did not play Pac-10 foe Stanford this season.
- Arizona only made two field goals in the entire season and was one of the nation's worst special teams group. They would finish the year two for eleven in field goal tries, with the only made kicks occurring against Oregon and TCU.
- The 2–10 2003 record was an opposite of the 1993 record for the Wildcats, as they went 10–2 in that season.
- The Mackovic era was proved to be a total failure for the Wildcats, and fans rated Mackovic as the worst Arizona football coach ever (with predecessor Dick Tomey being the best). The fans also believed that Mackovic destroyed the program due to his problems and that it would take several seasons for Arizona to recover and rebuild under future coaches in order for the program to be returned to success as it was under Tomey.
- This was the last season in which the Wildcats wore white helmets full-time. They would switch to blue helmets in 2004 and would not wear the white helmets again until 2009.
- The two wins were the fewest in a season by Arizona since 1957, when they finished 1–8–1. However, in 2021, Arizona went 1–11, which tied the 1957 team record for fewest victories in a full season.

== After the season ==
Soon after the season ended, Arizona hired Oklahoma defensive coordinator Mike Stoops as the new head coach following a national search, meaning that Hankwitz would not return for the 2004 season. Stoops, who had served under his brother Bob at Oklahoma, was hired to rebuild the program and to build a winning culture that was lost under Mackovic. He would go to spend most of the decade rebuilding the team and the Wildcats would return to its winning ways by 2008 before being fired in 2011. As for Hankwitz, he would later become defensive coordinator at Northwestern.
