= 2003 Silicon Valley Football Classic =

American college football game

UCLA Bruins	Fresno State Bulldogs
(6–6)	(8–5)
9	17
Head coach: Karl Dorrell	Head coach: Pat Hill
	1	2	3	4	Total
UCLA	0	7	2	0	9
Fresno State	14	3	0	0	17
- Date: December 30, 2003
- Season: 2003
- Stadium: Spartan Stadium
- Location: San Jose, California
- MVP: Rodney Davis (Fresno St.); Garrett McIntyre (Fresno St.)
- Referee: David Witvoet (Big Ten)
- Attendance: 20,126

United States TV coverage
- Network: ESPN2
- Announcers: Gary Bender, John Cooper

The 2003 Silicon Valley Football Classic was a post-season college football bowl game between the UCLA Bruins and the Fresno State Bulldogs on December 30, 2003, at Spartan Stadium in San Jose, California. It was the fourth time the Silicon Valley Football Classic was played and the final game of the 2003 NCAA Division I-A football season for both teams. Fresno State defeated UCLA 17–9. It was the sixth time the two teams had met on the field and the first victory for Fresno State.

For the 2003 bowl season the Silicon Valley Classic had contractual tie-ins with the Western Athletic Conference (WAC) and the Pacific-10 Conference (Pac-10). The SVC organizers had a choice between UCLA and the Washington Huskies, both of whom finished the season 6–6 and bowl eligible, to represent the Pac-10. The SVC invited UCLA, citing UCLA's victory against Washington earlier in the season.

Since the beginning of the bowl in 2000, the Fresno State Bulldogs represented the WAC. Fresno State and the Tulsa Golden Hurricane finished the season tied for second in the WAC and available for the SVC. Fresno State returned to the SVC for the fourth straight year, while Tulsa went to the Humanitarian Bowl.
