= 2003 Oregon State Beavers football team =

American college football season

2003 Oregon State Beavers football

Las Vegas Bowl champion

Las Vegas Bowl, W 55–14 vs. New Mexico
- Conference: Pacific-10 Conference
- Record: 8–5 (4–4 Pac-10)
- Head coach: Mike Riley (3rd season)
- Offensive coordinator: Paul Chryst (3rd season)
- Offensive scheme: Pro-style
- Defensive coordinator: Mark Banker (1st season)
- Base defense: 4–3
- Home stadium: Reser Stadium

2003 Pacific-10 Conference football standings
| | Conf. | | | Overall |
| Team | W | | L | W | | L |
|---|---|---|---|---|---|---|
| No. 1 USC $ | 7 | – | 1 | 12 | – | 1 |
| No. 9 Washington State | 6 | – | 2 | 10 | – | 3 |
| Oregon | 5 | – | 3 | 8 | – | 5 |
| California | 5 | – | 3 | 8 | – | 6 |
| Oregon State | 4 | – | 4 | 8 | – | 5 |
| Washington | 4 | – | 4 | 6 | – | 6 |
| UCLA | 4 | – | 4 | 6 | – | 7 |
| Arizona State | 2 | – | 6 | 5 | – | 7 |
| Stanford | 2 | – | 6 | 4 | – | 7 |
| Arizona | 1 | – | 7 | 2 | – | 10 |
$ – Conference champion; Rankings from AP Poll

The 2003 Oregon State Beavers football team represented Oregon State University as a member of the Pacific-10 Conference (Pac-10) during the 2003 NCAA Division I-A football season. Led by third-year head coach Mike Riley, who returned Oregon State after helming the team in 1997 and 1998, the Beavers compiled an overall record of 8–5 with a mark of 4–4 in conference play, placing in a three-way tie for fifth in the Pac-10. Oregon State was invited to the Las Vegas Bowl, where the Beavers defeated New Mexico. The team played home games at Reser Stadium in Corvallis, Oregon.

== Schedule ==
| Date | Time | Opponent | Rank | Site | TV | Result | Attendance | Source |
|---|---|---|---|---|---|---|---|---|
| August 28 | 7:00 pm | Sacramento State* | | Reser Stadium; Corvallis, OR | FSNNW | W 40–7 | 35,614 | |
| September 5 | 7:00 pm | at Fresno State* | | Bulldog Stadium; Fresno, CA | ESPN | L 14–16 | 35,553 | |
| September 13 | 3:30 pm | New Mexico State* | | Reser Stadium; Corvallis, OR | | W 28–16 | 35,831 | |
| September 20 | 4:00 pm | Boise State* | | Reser Stadium; Corvallis, OR | FSNNW | W 26–24 | 35,963 | |
| September 27 | 7:00 pm | No. 24 Arizona State | | Reser Stadium; Corvallis, OR | FSN | W 45–17 | 36,122 | |
| October 4 | 2:00 pm | at California | | Memorial Stadium; Berkeley, CA | | W 35–21 | 39,150 | |
| October 18 | 7:00 pm | Washington | No. 22 | Reser Stadium; Corvallis, OR | TBS | L 17–38 | 37,034 | |
| October 25 | 3:30 pm | at No. 6 Washington State | | Martin Stadium; Pullman, WA | FSN | L 30–36 | 35,117 | |
| November 1 | 1:00 pm | Arizona | | Reser Stadium; Corvallis, OR | | W 52–23 | 36,187 | |
| November 15 | 1:00 pm | Stanford | | Reser Stadium; Corvallis, OR | | W 43–3 | 36,251 | |
| November 22 | 12:30 pm | at Oregon | | Autzen Stadium; Eugene, OR (Civil War) | ABC | L 20–34 | 58,102 | |
| December 6 | 1:30 pm | at No. 2 USC | | Los Angeles Memorial Coliseum; Los Angeles, CA | ABC | L 28–52 | 73,864 | |
| December 24 | 5:30 pm | vs. New Mexico* | | Sam Boyd Stadium; Whitney, NV (Las Vegas Bowl) | ESPN | W 55–14 | 25,437 | |
*Non-conference game; Rankings from AP Poll released prior to the game; All times are in Pacific time

== Game summaries ==
=== Boise State ===
Boise State at Oregon State

| Team | 1 | 2 | 3 | 4 | Total |
|---|---|---|---|---|---|
| Boise State | 0 | 17 | 0 | 7 | 24 |
| • Oregon State | 10 | 6 | 3 | 7 | 26 |

- Date: September 20
- Location: Reser Stadium, Corvallis, Oregon
- Game start: 4:00 p.m. PDT
- Source: ESPN

Scoring summary
| 1 | 12:12 | Oregon State | Kirk Yliniemi 51-yard field goal | Oregon State 3-0 |
| 1 | 10:13 | Oregon State | Joe Newton 40-yard pass from Derek Anderson (Kirk Yliniemi kick) | Oregon State 10-0 |
| 2 | 14:53 | Oregon State | Kirk Yliniemi 25-yard field goal | Oregon State 13-0 |
| 2 | 14:04 | Boise State | T.J. Acree 67-yard pass from Ryan Dinwiddie (Tyler Jones kick) | Oregon State 13-7 |
| 2 | 11:03 | Boise State | Tyler Jones 44-yard field goal | Oregon State 13-10 |
| 2 | 5:46 | Oregon State | Kirk Yliniemi 33-yard field goal | Oregon State 16-10 |
| 2 | 1:19 | Boise State | Tim Gilligan 62-yard punt return (Tyler Jones kick) | Boise St 17-16 |
| 3 | 7:45 | Oregon State | Kirk Yliniemi 37-yard field goal | Oregon State 19-17 |
| 4 | 14:45 | Oregon State | Steven Jackson 11-yard run (Kirk Yliniemi kick) | Oregon State 26-17 |
| 4 | 11:56 | Boise State | David Mikell 3-yard run (Tyler Jones kick) | Oregon State 26-24 |

=== Arizona State ===
| Team | 1 | 2 | 3 | 4 | Total |
|---|---|---|---|---|---|
| Arizona St | 0 | 7 | 3 | 7 | 17 |
| • Oregon St | 7 | 17 | 0 | 21 | 45 |

- Date: September 27
- Location: Reser Stadium
- Game start: 7:10 p.m. PST
- Elapsed time: 3:40
- Game attendance: 36,122
- Game weather: Clear; 73 °F (23 °C); wind 24 mph (39 km/h) NW
- Referee: Jay Stricherz

Scoring summary
| Q1 | 7:21 | ORST | Anderson 6 yard run (Yliniemi kick) | ORST 7–0 |
| Q2 | 6:50 | AZST | Fulton 5 yard pass from Walter (Ainsworth kick) | Tie 7–7 |
| Q2 | 4:11 | ORST | Farley 61 yard pass from Anderson (Yliniemi kick) | ORST 14–7 |
| Q2 | 2:40 | ORST | Newsom 28 yard pass from Anderson (Yliniemi kick) | ORST 21–7 |
| Q2 | :00 | ORST | Yliniemi 29 yard field goal | ORST 24–7 |
| Q3 | 1:30 | AZST | Ainsworth 34 yard field goal | ORST 24–10 |
| Q4 | 11:09 | ORST | Jackson 15 yard run (Yliniemi kick) | ORST 31–10 |
| Q4 | 9:28 | ORST | Christensen recovered fumble in end zone (Yliniemi kick) | ORST 38–10 |
| Q4 | 7:07 | AZST | Hagan 20 yard pass from Walter (Ainsworth kick) | ORST 38–17 |
| Q4 | 5:12 | ORST | Wright 2 yard run (Yliniemi kick) | ORST 45–17 |

- Steven Jackson 26 Rush, 105 Yds

== Roster ==
- QB Derek Anderson, Jr.
- CB Aric Williams, RS-Jr.

== Team players drafted into the NFL ==
| Player | Position | Round | Pick | NFL club |
|---|---|---|---|---|
| Tim Euhus | Tight end | 4 | 109 | Buffalo Bills |
