= 2003 UCLA Bruins football team =

American college football season

2003 UCLA Bruins football

Silicon Valley Football Classic, L 9–17 vs. Fresno State
- Conference: Pacific-10 Conference
- Record: 6–7 (4–4 Pac-10)
- Head coach: Karl Dorrell (1st season)
- Offensive coordinator: Steve Axman (3rd season)
- Offensive scheme: Multiple
- Defensive coordinator: Larry Kerr (1st season)
- Base defense: 4–3
- Home stadium: Rose Bowl

2003 Pacific-10 Conference football standings
	Conf.			Overall
Team	W		L	W		L
No. 1 USC $	7	–	1	12	–	1
No. 9 Washington State	6	–	2	10	–	3
Oregon	5	–	3	8	–	5
California	5	–	3	8	–	6
Oregon State	4	–	4	8	–	5
Washington	4	–	4	6	–	6
UCLA	4	–	4	6	–	7
Arizona State	2	–	6	5	–	7
Stanford	2	–	6	4	–	7
Arizona	1	–	7	2	–	10
$ – Conference champion; Rankings from AP Poll

The 2003 UCLA Bruins football team represented the University of California, Los Angeles in the 2003 NCAA Division I-A football season. They played their home games at the Rose Bowl in Pasadena, California and were led by Karl Dorrell. It was Dorrell's first season as the UCLA head coach. UCLA was ranked #20 by College Football News in the preseason polls. The Bruins finished 6–7 overall, and were tied for fifth place in the Pacific-10 Conference with a 4–4 record. The Bruins were invited to play in the Silicon Valley Football Classic vs. Fresno State on December 30, 2003.

== Schedule ==
Date	Time	Opponent	Site	TV	Result	Attendance
September 6	1:30 pm	at No. 24 Colorado*	Folsom Field; Boulder, CO	ABC	L 14–16	48,534
September 13	5:00 pm	Illinois*	Rose Bowl; Pasadena, CA	ABC	W 6–3	51,118
September 20	12:30 pm	at No. 1 Oklahoma*	Gaylord Family Oklahoma Memorial Stadium; Norman, OK	ABC	L 24–59	83,317
September 27	7:00 pm	San Diego State*	Rose Bowl; Pasadena, CA	FSNW2	W 20–10	48,690
October 4	3:30 pm	No. 18 Washington	Rose Bowl; Pasadena, CA	FSN	W 46–16	68,319
October 11	3:30 pm	at Arizona	Arizona Stadium; Tucson, AZ	FSN	W 24–21	44,481
October 18	12:30 pm	California	Rose Bowl; Pasadena, CA (rivalry)	ABC	W 23–20 ^{OT}	53,825
October 25	7:00 pm	Arizona State^{†}	Rose Bowl; Pasadena, CA	FSN	W 20–13	61,778
November 1	12:30 pm	at Stanford	Stanford Stadium; Stanford, CA (rivalry)	FSN	L 14–21	44,950
November 8	4:00 pm	at No. 12 Washington State	Martin Stadium; Pullman, WA	ABC	L 13–31	33,846
November 15	12:30 pm	Oregon	Rose Bowl; Pasadena, CA	FSN	L 13–31	56,083
November 22	12:30 pm	at No. 2 USC	Los Angeles Memorial Coliseum; Los Angeles, CA (Victory Bell)	ABC	L 22–47	93,172
December 30	7:30 pm	vs. Fresno State*	Spartan Stadium; San Jose, CA (Silicon Valley Football Classic)	ESPN2	L 9–17	20,126
*Non-conference game; ^{†}Homecoming; Rankings from AP; All times are in Pacific time

== Game summaries ==
=== Colorado ===
UCLA at Colorado

Team	1	2	3	4	Total
Bruins	0	7	7	0	14
• Buffaloes	7	3	0	6	16

- Date: September 4, 2004
- Location: Folsom Field, Boulder, Colorado
- Game start: 1:37 PM
- Elapsed time: 3:23
- Game attendance: 48,534
- Game weather: Cloudy, 77 °F (25 °C), 36% humidity, 6 mph (9.7 km/h) S
- Referee: C. Castleberry
- Television network: ABC

=== Illinois ===
Illinois at UCLA

Team	1	2	3	4	Total
Fighting Illini	0	0	3	0	3
• Bruins	3	3	0	0	6

- Date: September 13, 2003
- Location: Rose Bowl, Pasadena, California
- Game start: 5:09 PM PST
- Elapsed time: 3:04
- Game attendance: 51,118
- Game weather: Hazy, 81 °F (27 °C), 51% humidity, 3 mph (4.8 km/h) S
- Referee: Jack Wood
- Television network: ABC

=== Oklahoma ===
UCLA at Oklahoma

Team	1	2	3	4	Total
Bruins	10	0	14	0	24
• Sooners	7	21	14	17	59

- Date: September 20, 2003
- Location: Memorial Stadium, Norman, Oklahoma
- Game start: 2:35 PM PST
- Elapsed time: 3:40
- Game attendance: 51,118
- Game weather: Clear, 79 °F (26 °C), 12 mph (19 km/h) S-SE
- Referee: Steve Usecheck
- Television network: ABC

Oklahoma's Antonio Perkins set an NCAA record for punt return yards in a game with 277 yards on seven returns. He also set an NCAA record with three punt returns for touchdowns in a game.

=== San Diego State ===
San Diego State at UCLA

Team	1	2	3	4	Total
Aztecs	0	3	0	7	10
• Bruins	0	3	7	10	20

- Date: September 27, 2003
- Location: Rose Bowl, Pasadena, California
- Game start: 7:08 PM PST
- Elapsed time: 3:04
- Game attendance: 48,690
- Game weather: Partly cloudy, 75 °F (24 °C), 61% humidity
- Referee: David Cutaia
- Television network: FSN West 2

=== Washington ===
Washington at UCLA

Team	1	2	3	4	Total
Huskies	10	6	0	0	16
• Bruins	0	7	15	24	46

- Date: October 4, 2003
- Location: Rose Bowl, Pasadena, California
- Game start: 3:41 PM PST
- Elapsed time: 3:22
- Game attendance: 68,319
- Game weather: Hazy, 77 °F (25 °C), 47% humidity, 2 mph (3.2 km/h) S
- Referee: Larry Farina
- Television network: FSN

=== Arizona ===
UCLA at Arizona

Team	1	2	3	4	Total
• Bruins	3	7	7	7	24
Wildcats	7	14	0	0	21

- Date: October 11, 2003
- Location: Arizona Stadium, Tucson, Arizona
- Game start: 3:40 PM PST
- Elapsed time: 3:09
- Game attendance: 44,481
- Game weather: Mostly clear, 85 °F (29 °C), 38% humidity, 5 mph (8.0 km/h) N
- Referee: Jack Folliard
- Television network: FSN

=== California ===
California at UCLA

Team	1	2	3	4	OT	Total
Golden Bears	3	0	9	8	0	20
• Bruins	7	0	7	6	3	23

- Date: October 18, 2003
- Location: Rose Bowl, Pasadena, California
- Game start: 12:39 PM PST
- Elapsed time: 3:20
- Game attendance: 53,825
- Game weather: Bright, 93 °F (34 °C), 23% humidity, 1 mph (1.6 km/h) S
- Referee: Jay Stricherz
- Television network: ABC

=== Arizona State ===
Arizona State at UCLA

Team	1	2	3	4	Total
Sun Devils	3	10	0	0	13
• Bruins	10	0	7	3	20

- Date: October 25, 2003
- Location: Rose Bowl, Pasadena, California
- Game attendance: 61,778
- Television network: FSN

Maurice Drew's 83-yard touchdown run tied for ninth longest run from scrimmage in UCLA history, with Derek Ayers (1993 vs. BYU) and Jackie Robinson (1939 vs. Oregon). It was also the longest run from scrimmage by a true freshman in UCLA history. This was Drew's first 100-yard game. It was the 12th time in UCLA history a true freshman has reached the 100-yard mark and it was the first since DeShaun Foster in 1998 (109 yards on 15 carries vs. USC).

=== Stanford ===
UCLA at Stanford

Team	1	2	3	4	Total
Bruins	0	7	0	7	14
• Cardinal	0	14	7	0	21

- Date: November 1, 2003
- Location: Stanford Stadium, Stanford, California
- Game start: 12:30 PM PST
- Elapsed time: 3:13
- Game attendance: 44,950
- Game weather: Crisp and clear, 65 °F (18 °C), 5 mph (8.0 km/h) N
- Referee: Jack Folliard
- Television network: FSN

=== Washington State ===
UCLA at Washington State

Team	1	2	3	4	Total
Bruins	0	6	7	0	13
• #12 Cougars	14	14	0	3	31

- Date: November 8, 2003
- Location: Martin Stadium, Pullman, Washington
- Game start: 4:08 PM PST
- Elapsed time: 3:42
- Game attendance: 33,846
- Game weather: Overcast, 48 °F (9 °C)
- Referee: David Cutaia
- Television network: ABC

=== Oregon ===
Oregon at UCLA

Team	1	2	3	4	Total
• Ducks	21	10	0	0	31
Bruins	3	3	0	7	13

- Date: November 15, 2003
- Location: Rose Bowl, Pasadena, California
- Game start: 12:39 PM PST
- Elapsed time: 3:06
- Game attendance: 56,083
- Game weather: Overcast, 68 °F (20 °C), 46% humidity, no wind
- Referee: Jack Folliard

=== USC ===
UCLA at USC

Team	1	2	3	4	Total
Bruins	0	2	7	13	22
• #2 Trojans	14	19	14	0	47

- Date: November 22, 2003
- Location: Los Angeles Memorial Coliseum, Los Angeles, California
- Game start: 12:40 PM PST
- Elapsed time: 3:30
- Game attendance: 93,172
- Game weather: Clear, 63 °F (17 °C), 15 mph (24 km/h) NW
- Referee: Larry Farina
- Television network: ABC

=== Fresno State (Silicon Valley Football Classic) ===
UCLA vs. Fresno State

Team	1	2	3	4	Total
Bruins	0	7	2	0	9
• Bulldogs	14	3	0	0	17

- Date: December 30, 2003
- Location: Spartan Stadium, San Jose, California
- Game start: 7:34 PM PST
- Elapsed time: 3:17
- Game attendance: 20,126
- Game weather: Cool, 54 °F (12 °C), wind SE
- Referee: David Witvoet

== Roster ==
2003 UCLA Bruins football team roster
Players
Coaches
Offense

Pos.	#	Name	Class
WR	87	Craig Bragg	Jr
TE	19	Marcedes Lewis	So
WR	1	Tab Perry	Jr
TE		Keith Carter	So

Defense

Pos.	#	Name	Class
DE	43	Dave Ball	Sr
DE	49	Mat Ball	Sr
DE	75	Ryan Boschetti	Sr
CB	15	Marcus Cassel	So
LB	11	Brandon Chillar	Sr
DB	24	Ben Emanuel	Jr
DT	77	Rodney Leisle	Sr
DB	17	Matthew Ware	Jr

Special teams

Pos.	#	Name	Class
P	39	Chris Kluwe	Jr

Head coach

- Karl Dorrell

Coordinators/assistant coaches

- Brian Schneider Special teams coordinator / safeties / linebackers coach

Legend

- (C) Team captain
- (S) Suspended
- (I) Ineligible
- Injured
- Redshirt

Roster
Last update: 2003-08-03
