= 2003 Washington State Cougars football team =

American college football season

2003 Washington State Cougars football
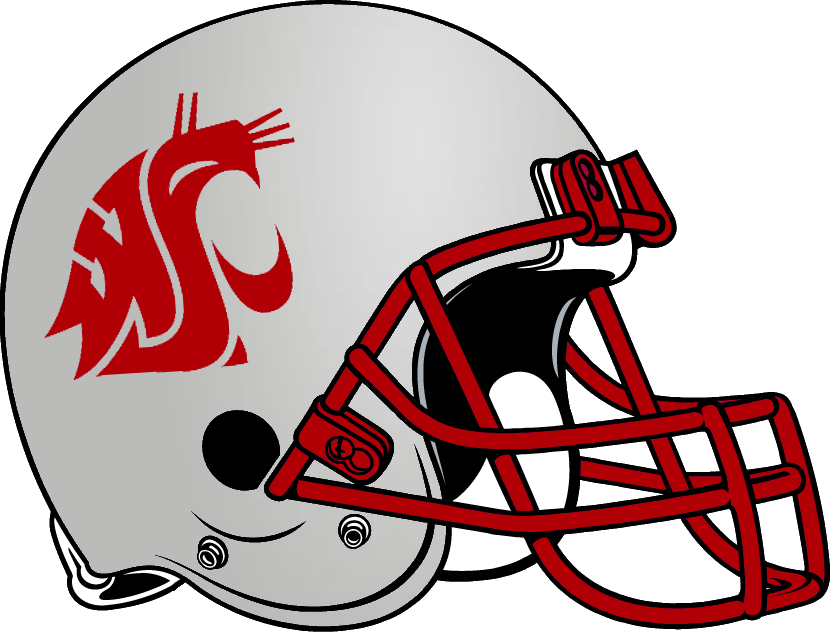

Holiday Bowl champion

Holiday Bowl, W 28–20 vs. Texas
- Conference: Pacific-10 Conference

Ranking
- Coaches: No. 9
- AP: No. 9
- Record: 10–3 (6–2 Pac-10)
- Head coach: Bill Doba (1st season)
- Offensive coordinator: Mike Levenseller (3rd season)
- Offensive scheme: Spread
- Defensive coordinator: Robb Akey (1st season)
- Base defense: 4–3
- Home stadium: Martin Stadium

2003 Pacific-10 Conference football standings
	Conf.			Overall
Team	W		L	W		L
No. 1 USC $	7	–	1	12	–	1
No. 9 Washington State	6	–	2	10	–	3
Oregon	5	–	3	8	–	5
California	5	–	3	8	–	6
Oregon State	4	–	4	8	–	5
Washington	4	–	4	6	–	6
UCLA	4	–	4	6	–	7
Arizona State	2	–	6	5	–	7
Stanford	2	–	6	4	–	7
Arizona	1	–	7	2	–	10
$ – Conference champion; Rankings from AP Poll

The 2003 Washington State Cougars football team represented Washington State University as a member of Pacific-10 Conference during the 2003 NCAA Division I-A football season. Led by first-year head coach Bill Doba, the Cougars compiled an overall record of 10–3 with a mark of 6–2 in conference play, finishing second in the Pac-10 behind champion USC. Washington State was invited to the Holiday Bowl in San Diego, where the Cougars defeated fifth-ranked Texas and moved up to ninth in the final rankings. The team played home games on campus, at Martin Stadium in Pullman, Washington.

== Schedule ==
Date	Time	Opponent	Rank	Site	TV	Result	Attendance	Source
August 30	7:30 pm	vs. Idaho*		Seahawks Stadium; Seattle, WA (Battle of the Palouse, Cougar Gridiron Classic)	FSNNW	W 25–0	50,113	
September 6	11:30 am	at No. 19 Notre Dame*		Notre Dame Stadium; Notre Dame, IN	NBC	L 26–29 ^{OT}	80,795	
September 13	12:30 pm	at No. 17 Colorado*		Folsom Field; Boulder, CO		W 47–26	48,116	
September 20	2:00 pm	New Mexico*	No. 24	Martin Stadium; Pullman, WA		W 23–13	32,344	
September 27	12:30 pm	at No. 10 Oregon	No. 21	Autzen Stadium; Eugene, OR	ABC	W 55–16	57,473	
October 4	2:00 pm	Arizona^{†}	No. 14	Martin Stadium; Pullman, WA		W 30–7	34,923	
October 18	2:00 pm	at Stanford	No. 6	Stanford Stadium; Stanford, CA		W 24–14	48,526	
October 25	3:30 pm	Oregon State	No. 6	Martin Stadium; Pullman, WA	FSN	W 36–30	35,117	
November 1	4:00 pm	at No. 3 USC	No. 6	Los Angeles Memorial Coliseum; Los Angeles	ABC	L 16–43	82,478	
November 8	4:00 pm	UCLA	No. 12	Martin Stadium; Pullman, WA	ABC	W 31–13	33,846	
November 15	12:30 pm	Arizona State	No. 8	Martin Stadium; Pullman, WA	ABC	W 34–19	30,423	
November 22	4:00 pm	at Washington	No. 8	Husky Stadium; Seattle, WA (Apple Cup)	FSN	L 19–27	74,549	
December 30	5:00 pm	vs. No. 5 Texas*	No. 15	Qualcomm Stadium; San Diego, CA (Holiday Bowl)	ESPN	W 28–20	61,102	
*Non-conference game; ^{†}Homecoming; Rankings from AP Poll released prior to the game; All times are in Pacific time

== Rankings ==
Ranking movements Legend: ██ Increase in ranking ██ Decrease in ranking RV = Received votes
	Week																
Poll	Pre	1	2	3	4	5	6	7	8	9	10	11	12	13	14	15	Final
AP	RV	RV	RV	24	21	14	12	6	6	6	12	8	8	16	15	15	9
Coaches	RV	RV	RV	25	21	15	12	6	6	6	13	8	8	14	14	14	9
BCS	Not released								9	8	15	10	10	15	16	16	Not released
