= Greg Burns (American football) =

American football player and coach (born 1972)

Current position
- Title: Cornerbacks coach
- Team: Washington State
- Conference: Pac-12

Biographical details
- Born: November 9, 1972 (age 53); Brooklyn, New York, U.S.
- Education: Washington State

Playing career
- 1991–1993, 1995: Washington State
- Position: Defensive back

Coaching career (HC unless noted)
- 1996: Washington State (GA)
- 1997: Idaho (DB)
- 1998–2001: Louisville (DB)
- 2002–2005: USC (DB)
- 2006: Tampa Bay Buccaneers (DB)
- 2007: Kansas State (DB)
- 2008–2011: Arizona State (DB)
- 2012: Purdue (DB)
- 2013: UMass (DB)
- 2014–2017: California (DB)
- 2018: Oregon State (DB)
- 2019: USC (DB)
- 2020: Arizona (CB)
- 2021–2023: UCLA (Analyst)
- 2024–2025: San Jose State (CB)
- 2026-Present: Washington State (DB)

Greg Burns (born November 9, 1972) is an American football coach and former player who is the secondary and safeties coach at Washington State University. He most recently served as analyst at UCLA, defensive backs coach at the University of Southern California, and cornerbacks coach San Jose State University.

== Playing career ==
Burns played defensive back at Washington State University where he was a four-year letter-winner. In his sophomore season he earned All-PAC-10 honors as an honorable mention.

== Coaching career ==
Burns spent a year as a graduate assistant at Washington State in 1996 and earned his master's degree from WSU in 1997. He spent the 1997 season as an assistant at Idaho. He then coached defensive backs at Louisville from 1998 to 2001. During his tenure with the Cardinals he coached six All-Conference cornerbacks. Burns them moved on to coach the secondary at USC from 2002 to 2005 under head coach Pete Carroll. At USC Burns was a coach on the Trojans back-to-back National Championships in 2003 and 2004. He would also coach two All-American Safeties during his USC tenure. In 2006 Burns moved on to the professional ranks, coaching defensive backs for the Tampa Bay Buccaneers. He then spent one season in 2007 with Kansas State as a defensive back coach. He then held the same position with Arizona State from 2008 to 2011 and Purdue in 2012. In 2013 Burns was named to the staff at UMass to serve as the teams' defensive backs coach.

In his career, Burns has coached in 10 bowl games, including four Bowl Championship Series (BCS) bowl games and two national championship games.
