= 2003 Oregon Ducks football team =

American college football season

2003 Oregon Ducks football

Sun Bowl, L 30–31 vs. Minnesota
- Conference: Pacific-10 Conference
- Record: 8–5 (5–3 Pac-10)
- Head coach: Mike Bellotti (9th season)
- Offensive coordinator: Andy Ludwig (2nd season)
- Offensive scheme: Pro spread
- Defensive coordinator: Nick Aliotti (7th season)
- Base defense: 4–3
- Captain: Game captains
- Home stadium: Autzen Stadium

2003 Pacific-10 Conference football standings
	Conf.			Overall
Team	W		L	W		L
No. 1 USC $	7	–	1	12	–	1
No. 9 Washington State	6	–	2	10	–	3
Oregon	5	–	3	8	–	5
California	5	–	3	8	–	6
Oregon State	4	–	4	8	–	5
Washington	4	–	4	6	–	6
UCLA	4	–	4	6	–	7
Arizona State	2	–	6	5	–	7
Stanford	2	–	6	4	–	7
Arizona	1	–	7	2	–	10
$ – Conference champion; Rankings from AP Poll

The 2003 Oregon Ducks football team represented the University of Oregon as a member of the Pacific-10 Conference (Pac-10) during the 2003 NCAA Division I-A football season. Led by ninth-year head coach Mike Bellotti, the Ducks compiled an overall record of 8–5 with a mark of 5–3 in conference play, tying for third place the Pac-10. Oregon was invited to the Sun Bowl, where the Ducks lost to Minnesota. The team played home games at Autzen Stadium in Eugene, Oregon.

== Schedule ==
Date	Time	Opponent	Rank	Site	TV	Result	Attendance	Source
August 30	6:00 pm	at Mississippi State*		Davis Wade Stadium; Starkville, MS	ESPN2	W 42–34	52,856	
September 6	12:30 pm	Nevada*		Autzen Stadium; Eugene, OR	OSN	W 31–23	56,471	
September 13	7:00 pm	at Arizona		Arizona Stadium; Tucson, AZ	TBS	W 48–10	40,462	
September 20	12:30 pm	No. 3 Michigan*	No. 22	Autzen Stadium; Eugene, OR	ABC	W 31–27	59,023	
September 27	12:30 pm	No. 21 Washington State	No. 10	Autzen Stadium; Eugene, OR	ABC	L 16–55	57,473	
October 3	7:00 pm	at Utah*	No. 19	Rice-Eccles Stadium; Salt Lake City, UT	ESPN2	L 13–17	44,676	
October 11	12:30 pm	at Arizona State		Sun Devil Stadium; Tempe, AZ	ABC	L 14–59	53,762	
October 25	12:30 pm	Stanford^{†}		Autzen Stadium; Eugene, OR (rivalry)		W 35–0	57,627	
November 1	7:00 pm	at Washington		Husky Stadium; Seattle, WA (rivalry)	TBS	L 10–42	72,450	
November 8	7:00 pm	California		Autzen Stadium; Eugene, OR	TBS	W 21–17	57,511	
November 15	12:30 pm	at UCLA		Rose Bowl; Pasadena, CA	FSN	W 31–13	56,083	
November 22	12:30 pm	Oregon State		Autzen Stadium; Eugene, OR (Civil War)	ABC	W 34–20	58,102	
December 31	11:30 am	vs. Minnesota*		Sun Bowl; El Paso, TX (Sun Bowl)	CBS	L 30–31	49,894	
*Non-conference game; ^{†}Homecoming; Rankings from AP Poll released prior to the game; All times are in Pacific time

== Game summaries ==
=== Mississippi State ===
Team	1	2	3	4	Total
• Oregon	28	0	14	0	42
Mississippi St	0	14	7	13	34

- Date: August 30
- Location: Davis Wade Stadium, Starkville, Mississippi
- Game start: 9:00 p.m. EST
- Source: ESPN

Scoring summary
1	13:02	Oregon	Samie Parker 55 yard pass from Kellen Clemens (Jared Siegel kick)	Oregon 7-0
1	9:41	Oregon	Terence Whitehead 9 yard run (Jared Siegel kick)	Oregon 14-0
1	5:06	Oregon	Demetrius Williams 86 yard pass from Kellen Clemens (Jared Siegel kick)	Oregon 21-0
1	1:10	Oregon	Matt Floberg 2 yard pass from Jason Fife (Jared Siegel kick)	Oregon 28-0
2	13:49	Mississippi St	Kevin Fant 1 yard run (Brent Smith kick)	Oregon 28-7
2	1:00	Mississippi St	Justin Jenkins 2 yard pass from Kevin Fant (Brent Smith kick)	Oregon 28-14
3	9:09	Mississippi St	Nick Turner 44 yard run (Brent Smith kick)	Oregon 28-21
3	6:46	Oregon	Matt Floberg 12 yard pass from Kellen Clemens (Jared Siegel kick)	Oregon 35-21
3	:24	Oregon	Jason Fife 6 yard run (Jared Siegel kick)	Oregon 42-21
4	7:39	Mississippi St	Tee Milons 14 yard pass from Kevin Fant (pass failed)	Oregon 42-27
4	3:04	Mississippi St	McKinley Scott 14 yard pass from Kevin Fant (Brent Smith kick)	Oregon 42-34

=== Nevada ===
Team	1	2	3	4	Total
Nevada	0	7	7	9	23
• Oregon	10	14	7	0	31

- Date: September 6, 2003
- Location: Autzen Stadium, Eugene, Oregon
- Game attendance: 56,471

=== Arizona ===
Team	1	2	3	4	Total
• Oregon	6	14	21	7	48
Arizona	0	0	3	7	10

- Date: September 13
- Location: Arizona Stadium, Tucson, Arizona
- Game start: 10:00 p.m. EST

Scoring summary
1	9:42	ORE	Jared Siegel 29 yard field goal	Oregon 3–0
1	1:24	ORE	Jared Siegel 22 yard field goal	Oregon 6–0
2	8:56	ORE	Jason Fife 5 yard run (Jared Siegel kick)	Oregon 13–0
2	1:02	ORE	Demetrius Williams 3 yard pass from Kellen Clemens (Jared Siegel kick)	Oregon 20–0
3	11:20	ARIZ	Bobby Gill 44 yard field goal	Oregon 20–3
3	8:00	ORE	Demetrius Williams 65 yard pass from Kellen Clemens (Jared Siegel kick)	Oregon 27–3
3	5:43	ORE	Kenny Washington 1 yard run (Jared Siegel kick)	Oregon 34–3
3	2:43	ORE	Demetrius Williams 30 yard pass from Jason Fife (Jared Siegel kick)	Oregon 41–3
4	11:47	ORE	Ryan Shaw 7 yard pass from Jason Fife (Jared Siegel kick)	Oregon 48–3
4	3:42	ARIZ	Biren Ealy 53 yard pass from Ryan O'Hara (Bobby Gill kick)	Oregon 48–10

=== Michigan ===
Team	1	2	3	4	Total
Michigan	6	0	7	14	27
• Oregon	0	21	3	7	31

- Date: September 20
- Location: Autzen Stadium, Eugene, OR
- Game start: 3:30 p.m. EST

Scoring summary
1	5:42	MICH	Jeremy LeSueur 78 yard blocked field goal return (kick failed)	MICH 6-0
2	13:44	ORE	Terrence Whitehead 19 yard run (Jared Siegel kick)	ORE 7-6
2	10:01	ORE	Jason Fife 15 yard run (Jared Siegel kick)	ORE 14-6
2	7:50	ORE	Steven Moore 61 yard punt return (Jared Siegel kick)	ORE 21-6
3	11:09	ORE	Jared Siegel 36 yard field goal	ORE 24-6
3	4:03	MICH	Jason Avant 23 yard pass from John Navarre (Adam Finley kick)	ORE 24-13
4	11:04	MICH	Steve Breaston 9 yard pass from John Navarre (John Navarre to Braylon Edwards pass)	ORE 24-21
4	6:55	ORE	Jordan Carey 1 yard blocked punt return (Jared Siegel kick)	ORE 31-21
4	2:18	MICH	Steve Breaston 36 yard pass from John Navarre (kick blocked)	ORE 31-27

- Highest ranked non-conference opponent Oregon defeated at home

=== California ===
Team	1	2	3	4	Total
California	0	10	0	7	17
• Oregon	0	7	0	14	21

- Date: November 8
- Location: Autzen Stadium • Eugene, Oregon
- Game start: 10:00 p.m. EST

Scoring summary
2	14:56	CAL	Adimchinobi Echemandu 1 yard run (Tyler Frederickson kick)	California 7-0
2	6:51	ORE	Samie Parker 13 yard pass from Jason Fife (Jared Siegel kick)	Tie 7-7
2	2:41	CAL	Tyler Frederickson 53 yard field goal	California 10-7
4	10:07	CAL	Garrett Cross 18 yard pass from Aaron Rodgers (Tyler Frederickson kick)	California 17-7
4	4:19	ORE	Tim Day 31 yard pass from Kellen Clemens (Jared Siegel kick)	California 17-14
4	:47	ORE	Terrence Whitehead 1 yard run (Jared Siegel kick)	Oregon 21-17t

=== Oregon State ===
Team	1	2	3	4	Total
Oregon State	7	3	3	7	20
• Oregon	7	7	14	6	34

- Date: November 22
- Location: Autzen Stadium, Eugene, OR
- Game start: 3:30 p.m. EST
- Television network: ABC

Scoring summary
1	11:45	OSU	Steven Jackson 3 yard run (Kirk Yliniemi kick)	OSU 7-0
1	7:46	ORE	Terrence Whitehead 15 yard pass from Kellen Clemens (Jared Siegel kick)	Tied 7-7
2	14:55	ORE	Demetrius Williams 79 yard pass from Kellen Clemens (Jared Siegel kick)	ORE 14-7
2	5:22	OSU	Kirk Yliniemi 29 yard field goal	ORE 14-10
3	9:21	ORE	Kellen Clemens 4 yard run (Jared Siegel kick)	ORE 21-10
3	7:02	OSU	Kirk Yliniemi 28 yard field goal	ORE 21-13
3	3:20	ORE	Dante Rosario 15 yard pass from Kellen Clemens (Jared Siegel kick)	ORE 28-13
4	13:38	OSU	Pat Loney 1 yard pass from Derek Anderson (Kirk Yliniemi kick)	ORE 28-20
4	6:54	ORE	Jared Siegel 18 yard field goal	ORE 31-20
4	3:36	ORE	Jared Siegel 22-yard field goal	ORE 34-20

== Personnel ==
=== Recruiting ===
College recruiting
Name	Hometown	School	Height	Weight	40^{‡}	Commit date
Dennis Dixon; QB	San Leandro, CA	San Leandro HS	6 ft 4 in (1.93 m)	179 lb (81 kg)	4.5	Feb 5, 2003
Dennis Dixon; QB	Recruit ratings: Scout: Rivals:					
Ryan Gilliam; CB	Tallahassee, FL	Lincoln HS	5 ft 10 in (1.78 m)	171 lb (78 kg)	4.4	Feb 5, 2003
Ryan Gilliam; CB	Recruit ratings: Scout: Rivals:					
Lance Broadus; LB	Woodland Hills, CA	William Howard Taft HS	6 ft 2 in (1.88 m)	223 lb (101 kg)	4.5	Feb 3, 2003
Lance Broadus; LB	Recruit ratings: Scout: Rivals:					
Johnny DuRocher; QB	Spanaway, WA	Bethel HS	6 ft 4 in (1.93 m)	205 lb (93 kg)	4.8	May 8, 2002
Johnny DuRocher; QB	Recruit ratings: Scout: Rivals:					
Jordan Carey; S	Olympia, WA	Capital HS	6 ft 0 in (1.83 m)	193 lb (88 kg)	4.4	Jan 25, 2003
Jordan Carey; S	Recruit ratings: Scout: Rivals:					
Marcus Miller; LB	Norwalk, CA	Cerritos CC	6 ft 3 in (1.91 m)	220 lb (100 kg)	4.5	Dec 18, 2002
Marcus Miller; LB	Recruit ratings: Scout: Rivals:					
Pat So'oalo; OL	Kailua, HI	Kailua HS	6 ft 6 in (1.98 m)	288 lb (131 kg)	4.9	Jan 25, 2003
Pat So'oalo; OL	Recruit ratings: Scout: Rivals:					
AJ Tuitele; S	Banning, CA	Banning HS	6 ft 0 in (1.83 m)	190 lb (86 kg)	4.5	Jun 14, 2002
AJ Tuitele; S	Recruit ratings: Scout: Rivals:					
Eddie Whitaker; TE	Van Nuys, CA	Los Angeles Valley CC	6 ft 4 in (1.93 m)	248 lb (112 kg)	4.7	Jan 12, 2003
Eddie Whitaker; TE	Recruit ratings: Scout: Rivals:					
Rodney Woods; CB	Fresno, CA	Fresno CC	5 ft 10 in (1.78 m)	180 lb (82 kg)	4.5	Jan 20, 2003
Rodney Woods; CB	Recruit ratings: Scout: Rivals:					
Paul Martinez; K	Danville, CA	San Ramon Valley HS	6 ft 2 in (1.88 m)	195 lb (88 kg)	4.9	Jan 20, 2003
Paul Martinez; K	Recruit ratings: Scout: Rivals:					
Marc Walker; CB	San Francisco, CA	CC of San Francisco	6 ft 0 in (1.83 m)	175 lb (79 kg)	4.5	Dec 18, 2003
Marc Walker; CB	Recruit ratings: Scout: Rivals:					
Victor Filipe; DT	Salt Lake City, UT	Highland HS	6 ft 4 in (1.93 m)	290 lb (130 kg)	NA	Dec 9, 2002
Victor Filipe; DT	Recruit ratings: Scout: Rivals:					
Jerome Johnson; LB	Los Angeles, CA	Susan Miller Dorsey HS	6 ft 1 in (1.85 m)	243 lb (110 kg)	4.7	Dec 16, 2002
Jerome Johnson; LB	Recruit ratings: Scout: Rivals:					
Brady Leaf; QB	Great Falls, MT	C M Russell HS	6 ft 5 in (1.96 m)	205 lb (93 kg)	4.8	Dec 25, 2002
Brady Leaf; QB	Recruit ratings: Scout: Rivals:					
Brian Paysinger; WR	Long Beach, CA	Woodrow Wilson Classical HS	6 ft 4 in (1.93 m)	190 lb (86 kg)	4.4	Jan 16, 2003
Brian Paysinger; WR	Recruit ratings: Scout: Rivals:					
Dante Rosario; LB	Dayton, OR	Dayton HS	6 ft 3 in (1.91 m)	220 lb (100 kg)	4.6	Jul 9, 2002
Dante Rosario; LB	Recruit ratings: Scout: Rivals:					
Garren Strong; WR	Cupertino, CA	Homestead HS	6 ft 3 in (1.91 m)	190 lb (86 kg)	4.5	Dec 18, 2002
Garren Strong; WR	Recruit ratings: Scout: Rivals:					
Josh Tschirgi; OL	Vancouver, WA	Skyview HS	6 ft 4 in (1.93 m)	275 lb (125 kg)	5.1	Nov 20, 2002
Josh Tschirgi; OL	Recruit ratings: Scout: Rivals:					
Brandon Bair; TE	Saint Anthony, ID	South Fremont HS	6 ft 7 in (2.01 m)	238 lb (108 kg)	NA	Feb 4, 2003
Brandon Bair; TE	Recruit ratings: Scout: Rivals:					
Marcus Maxwell; WR	Santa Clara, CA	Diablo Valley College	6 ft 3 in (1.91 m)	205 lb (93 kg)	4.5	Jan 22, 2003
Marcus Maxwell; WR	Recruit ratings: Scout: Rivals:					
Kyle Weatherspoon; WR	Lynwood, CA	Lynwood HS	6 ft 1 in (1.85 m)	182 lb (83 kg)	NA	Feb 4, 2003
Kyle Weatherspoon; WR	Recruit ratings: Scout: Rivals:					
Ramond White; LB	Henderson, NV	Green Valley HS	6 ft 4 in (1.93 m)	225 lb (102 kg)	4.5	Jan 22, 2003
Ramond White; LB	Recruit ratings: Scout: Rivals:					
Dan Kause; TE	Anaheim, CA	Servite CC	6 ft 4 in (1.93 m)	248 lb (112 kg)	4.7	Dec 9, 2002
Dan Kause; TE	Recruit ratings: Scout: Rivals:					
Overall recruit ranking: Scout: 44 Rivals: 26
‡ Refers to 40-yard dash; Note: In many cases, Scout, Rivals, 247Sports, On3, and ESPN may conflict in their listings of height, weight and 40 time.; In these cases, the average was taken. ESPN grades are on a 100-point scale.; Sources: "Oregon Football Commitment List 2003". Rivals.; "Oregon College Football Recruiting Commits 2003". Scout.; "Scout.com Team Recruiting Rankings". Scout.; "2003 Team Ranking". Rivals.com.
