= 2003 Stanford Cardinal football team =

American college football season

2003 Stanford Cardinal football
- Conference: Pacific-10 Conference
- Record: 4–7 (2–6 Pac-10)
- Head coach: Buddy Teevens (2nd season)
- Offensive coordinator: Bill Cubit (1st season)
- Offensive scheme: Spread
- Defensive coordinator: A. J. Christoff (2nd season)
- Base defense: 4–3
- Home stadium: Stanford Stadium

2003 Pacific-10 Conference football standings
	Conf.			Overall
Team	W		L	W		L
No. 1 USC $	7	–	1	12	–	1
No. 9 Washington State	6	–	2	10	–	3
Oregon	5	–	3	8	–	5
California	5	–	3	8	–	6
Oregon State	4	–	4	8	–	5
Washington	4	–	4	6	–	6
UCLA	4	–	4	6	–	7
Arizona State	2	–	6	5	–	7
Stanford	2	–	6	4	–	7
Arizona	1	–	7	2	–	10
$ – Conference champion; Rankings from AP Poll

The 2003 Stanford Cardinal football team represented Stanford University in the 2003 NCAA Division I-A football season. The team was led by head coach Buddy Teevens.

== Schedule ==
Date	Time	Opponent	Site	TV	Result	Attendance
September 6	7:00 p.m.	San Jose State*	Stanford Stadium; Stanford, CA (rivalry)		W 31–10	34,345
September 20	3:30 p.m.	at BYU*	LaVell Edwards Stadium; Provo, UT	KRON	W 18–14	61,446
September 27	12:30 p.m.	at No. 18 Washington	Husky Stadium; Seattle, WA		L 17–28	71,875
October 11	7:00 p.m.	at No. 9 USC	Los Angeles Memorial Coliseum; Los Angeles, CA (rivalry)	FSN	L 21–44	68,341
October 18	2:00 p.m.	No. 6 Washington State^{†}	Stanford Stadium; Stanford, CA		L 14–24	48,526
October 25	12:30 p.m.	at Oregon	Autzen Stadium; Eugene, OR (rivalry)		L 0–35	57,627
November 1	12:30 p.m.	UCLA	Stanford Stadium; Stanford, CA (rivalry)	FSN	W 21–14	44,950
November 8	2:00 p.m.	Arizona State	Stanford Stadium; Stanford, CA	KRON	W 37–28	26,950
November 15	1:00 p.m.	at Oregon State	Reser Stadium; Corvallis, OR		L 3–43	36,251
November 22	12:30 p.m.	California	Stanford Stadium; Stanford, CA (106th Big Game)	KGO	L 16–28	67,950
November 29	5:00 p.m.	Notre Dame*	Stanford Stadium; Stanford, CA (Legends Trophy)	ABC	L 7–57	46,500
*Non-conference game; ^{†}Homecoming; Rankings from AP Poll released prior to the game; All times are in Pacific time

== Coaching staff ==
- Buddy Teevens – Head coach
- David Kelly – Offensive coordinator and associate head coach and wide receivers
- Bill Cubit – Quarterbacks
- Wayne Moses – Running backs
- Tom Quinn – Tight ends and special teams and recruiting coordinator
- Steve Morton – Offensive line
- A.J. Christoff – Co-defensive coordinator and defensive backs
- Dave Tipton – Defensive tackles
- Peter McCarty – Defensive ends
- Tom Williams – Co-defensive coordinator and linebackers
