= Chris Vincent =

Chris Vincent may refer to:

- Chris Vincent (American football) (born 1981), am American football running back
- Chris Vincent (motorcycle sidecar racer) (1935–2021), a British motorcycle sidecar road racer
- Christy Kinahan (full name "Christopher Vincent Kinahan"; born 1957), an Irish suspected crime boss

== See also ==
- Christian Vincent, a disambiguation page
- Christophe Vincent (born 1992), French association football player
