= 2003 USC Trojans football team =

American college football season

2003 USC Trojans football

AP Poll national champion FWAA national champion Pac-10 champion Rose Bowl champion

Rose Bowl, W 28–14 vs. Michigan
- Conference: Pacific-10 Conference

Ranking
- Coaches: No. 2
- AP: No. 1
- Record: 12–1 (7–1 Pac-10)
- Head coach: Pete Carroll (3rd season)
- Offensive coordinator: Norm Chow (3rd season)
- Offensive scheme: Pro-style
- Base defense: 4–3
- Captains: Keary Colbert; Melvin Simmons
- Home stadium: Los Angeles Memorial Coliseum (c. 92,000, grass)

2003 Pacific-10 Conference football standings
	Conf.			Overall
Team	W		L	W		L
No. 1 USC $	7	–	1	12	–	1
No. 9 Washington State	6	–	2	10	–	3
Oregon	5	–	3	8	–	5
California	5	–	3	8	–	6
Oregon State	4	–	4	8	–	5
Washington	4	–	4	6	–	6
UCLA	4	–	4	6	–	7
Arizona State	2	–	6	5	–	7
Stanford	2	–	6	4	–	7
Arizona	1	–	7	2	–	10
$ – Conference champion; Rankings from AP Poll

The 2003 USC Trojans football team represented the University of Southern California in the 2003 NCAA Division I-A football season. They won their first national championship since 1978 as they were named the Associated Press and Football Writers Association of America (FWAA) national champions. However, the Trojans were denied a spot in the BCS National Championship Game by the BCS selections for the national championship game, where LSU won the Coaches' Poll title, resulting in a split national championship - the last time this has happened.

The regular season ended with three one-loss teams in BCS contention: Oklahoma, LSU and USC. USC ended the regular season ranked #1 and LSU #2 in both the AP Poll and the Coaches' Poll. USC lost one triple-overtime game at California, which finished 8–6; LSU had a 12-point home loss against a Florida team that went 8–5; Oklahoma, which had been ranked #1 for most of the season, fell to #3 after suffering a 35–7 defeat in the 2003 Big 12 Championship Game to Kansas State, which finished 11–4. Controversy erupted when the BCS computers selected Oklahoma–LSU as the BCS title game. During the bowl games, USC had a convincing 28–14 win over #4 Michigan in the Rose Bowl while LSU beat Oklahoma 21–14 in the Sugar Bowl (designated the BCS title game). USC remained #1 in the final AP Poll with 48 of the 65 votes, and LSU was ranked, by contractual obligation, #1 in the final Coaches' Poll, though three coaches did not follow instructions and voted USC #1 in that poll as well.

== Schedule ==
Date	Time	Opponent	Rank	Site	TV	Result	Attendance	Source
August 30	3:00 p.m.	at No. 6 Auburn*	No. 8	Jordan–Hare Stadium; Auburn, AL	CBS	W 23–0	86,063	
September 6	5:00 p.m.	BYU*	No. 5	Los Angeles Memorial Coliseum; Los Angeles, CA	ABC	W 35–18	75,315	
September 13	1:00 p.m.	Hawaii*	No. 4	Los Angeles Memorial Coliseum; Los Angeles, CA	FSN	W 61–32	73,654	
September 27	3:30 p.m.	at California	No. 3	California Memorial Stadium; Berkeley, CA	FSN	L 31–34 ^{3OT}	51,208	
October 4	12:30 p.m.	at Arizona State	No. 10	Sun Devil Stadium; Tempe, AZ	ABC	W 37–17	56,527	
October 11	7:00 p.m.	Stanford	No. 9	Los Angeles Memorial Coliseum; Los Angeles, CA (rivalry)	FSN	W 44–21	68,341	
October 18	11:30 a.m.	at Notre Dame*	No. 4	Notre Dame Stadium; Notre Dame, IN (rivalry)	NBC	W 45–14	80,795	
October 25	12:30 p.m.	at Washington	No. 4	Husky Stadium; Seattle, WA	ABC	W 43–23	72,015	
November 1	4:00 p.m.	No. 6 Washington State^{†}	No. 3	Los Angeles Memorial Coliseum; Los Angeles, CA	ABC	W 43–16	82,478	
November 15	4:00 p.m.	at Arizona	No. 2	Arizona Stadium; Tucson, AZ	TBS	W 45–0	39,201	
November 22	12:30 p.m.	UCLA	No. 2	Los Angeles Memorial Coliseum; Los Angeles, CA (Victory Bell)	ABC	W 47–22	93,172	
December 6	1:30 p.m.	Oregon State	No. 2	Los Angeles Memorial Coliseum; Los Angeles, CA	ABC	W 52–28	73,864	
January 1, 2004	1:30 p.m.	vs. No. 4 Michigan*	No. 1	Rose Bowl; Pasadena, CA (Rose Bowl, College GameDay)	ABC	W 28–14	93,849	
*Non-conference game; ^{†}Homecoming; Rankings from AP Poll released prior to the game; All times are in Pacific time

== Rankings ==
Ranking movements Legend: ██ Increase in ranking ██ Decrease in ranking ( ) = First-place votes
	Week																
Poll	Pre	1	2	3	4	5	6	7	8	9	10	11	12	13	14	15	Final
AP	8	4 (6)	4 (4)	4 (2)	3 (2)	10	9	5	5	3	2	2	2	2	2	1 (42)	1 (48)
Coaches	8	5	4 (1)	3 (1)	3 (1)	10	9	4	4	3	2	2	2	2	2	1 (37)	2 (3)
BCS	Not released								7	4	2	2	3	2	2	3	Not released

== Game summaries ==
=== Auburn ===
Team	1	2	3	4	Total
• USC	10	0	6	7	23
Auburn	0	0	0	0	0

- Date: August 30
- Location: Jordan–Hare Stadium • Auburn, Alabama
- Game attendance: 86,063
- Referee: Steve Shaw
- TV announcers (CBS): Verne Lundquist, Todd Blackledge and Jill Arrington

Scoring summary
1	12:38	USC	Mike Williams 5 yard pass from Matt Leinart (Ryan Killeen kick)	USC 7-0
1	3:21	USC	Ryan Killeen 28 yard field goal	USC 10-0
3	11:50	USC	Ryan Killeen 42 yard field goal	USC 13-0
3	7:22	USC	Ryan Killeen 35 yard field goal	USC 16-0
4	13:51	USC	Hershel Dennis 14 yard run (Ryan Killeen kick)	USC 23-0

USC opened the season visiting Auburn University: the Tigers were also ranked in the top 10 and had been named a pre-season favorite to be the national champion by at least one major news organization. In his first start, quarterback Matt Leinart led the Trojans on a dominating 23–0 performance.

== Personnel ==
=== Roster ===
2003 USC Trojans football team roster
Players
Coaches
Offense

Pos.	#	Name	Class
TE	86	Dominique Byrd	So
RB	5	Reggie Bush	Fr
QB	10	Matt Cassel	Jr
WR	83	Keary Colbert	Sr
TE	44	Gregg Guenther	So
TE	81	Alex Holmes	Sr
C	62	Norm Katnik	Sr
RB	37	David Kirtman	So
QB	11	Matt Leinart	So
OT	77	Jacob Rogers	Sr
G	78	Lenny Vandermade	Jr
RB	35	Lee Webb	Jr
WR	1	Mike Williams	So

Defense

Pos.	#	Name	Class
CB	8	Marcell Allmond	Sr
LB	59	Collin Ashton	So
DT	84	Shaun Cody	So
LB	6	Matt Grootegoed	Jr
DB	27	Jason Leach	Jr
DT	99	Mike Patterson	Jr

Special teams

Pos.	#	Name	Class

Head coach

- Pete Carroll

Coordinators/assistant coaches

- Norm Chow (OC)
- Ed Orgeron (AHC/DL/RC)
- Tim Davis (OL)
- Greg Burns (DB)
- Lane Kiffin (WR)
- Rocky Seto (S)
- Brennan Carroll (GA)

Legend

- (C) Team captain
- (S) Suspended
- (I) Ineligible
- Injured
- Redshirt

Roster

=== Recruiting ===
With the late arrival of quarterback John David Booty, who left high school a year early to attend USC, the Trojans' 2003 recruiting class was considered by some to be the best in the country. Its roster included many NFL draft picks over several years, including four first-round picks.

2006 NFL draft:

- Reggie Bush (Round 1, Pick 2)
- Matt Leinart (Round 1, Pick 10)
- LenDale White (Round 2, Pick 45),

2007 NFL draft:

- Steve Smith (Round 2, Pick 51)
- Eric Wright (Finished career at UNLV, Round 2, Pick 53)
- Ryan Kalil (Round 2, Pick 59)

2008 NFL draft:

- Sedrick Ellis (Round 1, Pick 7)
- Sam Baker (Round 1, Pick 21)
- Lawrence Jackson (Round 1, Pick 28)
- Terrell Thomas (Round 2, Pick 63)
- John David Booty (Round 5, Pick 137)
- Thomas Williams (Round 5, Pick 155)
- Chauncey Washington (Round 7, Pick 213)
