= 2003 Arizona State Sun Devils football team =

American college football season

2003 Arizona State Sun Devils football
- Conference: Pacific-10 Conference
- Record: 5–7 (2–6 Pac-10)
- Head coach: Dirk Koetter (3rd season)
- Defensive coordinator: Brent Guy (3rd season)
- Captains: Riccardo Stewart; Andrew Walter
- Home stadium: Sun Devil Stadium

2003 Pacific-10 Conference football standings
	Conf.			Overall
Team	W		L	W		L
No. 1 USC $	7	–	1	12	–	1
No. 9 Washington State	6	–	2	10	–	3
Oregon	5	–	3	8	–	5
California	5	–	3	8	–	6
Oregon State	4	–	4	8	–	5
Washington	4	–	4	6	–	6
UCLA	4	–	4	6	–	7
Arizona State	2	–	6	5	–	7
Stanford	2	–	6	4	–	7
Arizona	1	–	7	2	–	10
$ – Conference champion; Rankings from AP Poll

The 2003 Arizona State Sun Devils football team represented Arizona State University as a member of the Pacific-10 Conference (Pac-10) during the 2003 NCAA Division I-A football season. Led by third-year head coach Dirk Koetter, the Sun Devils compiled an overall record of 5–7 with a mark of 2–6 in conference play, tying for eighth place in the Pac-10. The team played home games at Sun Devil Stadium in Tempe, Arizona.

== Schedule ==
Date	Time	Opponent	Rank	Site	TV	Result	Attendance	Source
September 6	7:00 pm	Northern Arizona*	No. 20	Sun Devil Stadium; Tempe, AZ		W 34–14	60,069	
September 13	7:00 pm	Utah State*	No. 16	Sun Devil Stadium; Tempe, AZ		W 26–16	51,180	
September 20	3:00 pm	at No. 18 Iowa*	No. 16	Kinnick Stadium; Iowa City, IA	ESPN2	L 2–21	70,397	
September 27	7:00 pm	at Oregon State		Reser Stadium; Corvallis, OR	FSN	L 17–45	36,122	
October 4	12:30 pm	No. 10 USC		Sun Devil Stadium; Tempe, AZ	ABC	L 17–37	56,527	
October 11	12:30 pm	Oregon		Sun Devil Stadium; Tempe, AZ	ABC	W 59–14	53,762	
October 18	10:30 am	at North Carolina*		Kenan Memorial Stadium; Chapel Hill, NC		W 33–31	42,000	
October 25	7:00 pm	at UCLA		Rose Bowl; Pasadena, CA	FSN	L 13–20	61,778	
November 1	1:30 pm	California^{†}		Sun Devil Stadium; Tempe, AZ		L 23–51	48,452	
November 8	3:00 pm	at Stanford		Stanford Stadium; Stanford, CA		L 27–38	26,950	
November 15	1:30 pm	at No. 8 Washington State		Martin Stadium; Pullman, WA		L 19–34	30,423	
November 28	1:00 pm	Arizona		Sun Devil Stadium; Tempe, AZ (rivalry)	FSN	W 28–7	55,498	
*Non-conference game; ^{†}Homecoming; Rankings from AP Poll released prior to the game; All times are in Mountain time

== Roster ==
2003 Arizona State Sun Devils football team roster
Players
Coaches
Offense

Pos.	#	Name	Class
C	53	Drew Hodgdon	Jr
FB	44	Mike Karney	Sr
QB	16	Andrew Walter	Jr

Defense

Pos.	#	Name	Class

Special teams

Pos.	#	Name	Class

Head coach

- Dirk Koetter

Coordinators/assistant coaches

Legend

- (C) Team captain
- (S) Suspended
- (I) Ineligible
- Injured
- Redshirt

Roster
