= 2003 California Golden Bears football team =

American college football season

2003 California Golden Bears football

Insight Bowl champion

Insight Bowl, W 52–49 vs. Virginia Tech
- Conference: Pacific-10 Conference
- Record: 8–6 (5–3 Pac-10)
- Head coach: Jeff Tedford (2nd season)
- Offensive coordinator: George Cortez (2nd season)
- Offensive scheme: Pro-style
- Defensive coordinator: Bob Gregory (2nd season)
- Base defense: 4–3
- Captains: Lorenzo Alexander; Adimchinobe Echemandu; Donnie McCleskey; Aaron Rodgers
- Home stadium: California Memorial Stadium

2003 Pacific-10 Conference football standings
	Conf.			Overall
Team	W		L	W		L
No. 1 USC $	7	–	1	12	–	1
No. 9 Washington State	6	–	2	10	–	3
Oregon	5	–	3	8	–	5
California	5	–	3	8	–	6
Oregon State	4	–	4	8	–	5
Washington	4	–	4	6	–	6
UCLA	4	–	4	6	–	7
Arizona State	2	–	6	5	–	7
Stanford	2	–	6	4	–	7
Arizona	1	–	7	2	–	10
$ – Conference champion; Rankings from AP Poll

The 2003 California Golden Bears football team was an American football team that represented the University of California, Berkeley in the Pacific-10 Conference (Pac-10) during the 2003 NCAA Division I-A football season. In their second year under head coach Jeff Tedford, the Golden Bears compiled an 8–6 record (5–3 in Pac-10, tied for third) and outscored their opponents 457 to 341.

The Bears were led on the field by sophomore quarterback Aaron Rodgers, a junior college transfer who became the starter on September 20 against Illinois. In his second start the following week, Rodgers led Cal to a 21–7 halftime lead over third-ranked USC before being replaced due to injury in the second half by Reggie Robertson. The Bears won in triple overtime, 34–31. In late December, Cal defeated Virginia Tech 52–49 in the Insight Bowl at Phoenix; Rodgers passed for 394 yards and was the game's offensive MVP.

Rodgers tied Cal's season record with five 300-yard games and set a Cal record for the lowest percentage of passes intercepted at 1.43%. The Golden Bears' statistical leaders included Rodgers with 2,903 passing yards, Adimchinobe Echemandu with 1,195 rushing yards, and Geoff McArthur with 1,504 receiving yards.

== Schedule ==
Date	Time	Opponent	Site	TV	Result	Attendance	Source
August 23	6:45 p.m.	vs. No. 7 Kansas State*	Arrowhead Stadium; Kansas City, MO (BCA Classic)	ESPN	L 28–42	50,823	
August 30	1:00 p.m.	Southern Miss*	California Memorial Stadium; Berkeley, CA	HDNet	W 34–2	33,552	
September 6	3:00 p.m.	Colorado State*	California Memorial Stadium; Berkeley, CA	FSN	L 21–23	34,096	
September 11	4:45 p.m.	at Utah*	Rice–Eccles Stadium; Salt Lake City, UT	ESPN	L 24–31	46,768	
September 20	9:00 a.m.	at Illinois*	Memorial Stadium; Champaign, IL	ESPN Plus	W 31–24	58,363	
September 27	3:30 p.m.	No. 3 USC	California Memorial Stadium; Berkeley, CA	FSN	W 34–31 ^{3OT}	51,208	
October 4	2:00 p.m.	Oregon State	California Memorial Stadium; Berkeley, CA		L 21–35	39,150	
October 18	12:30 p.m.	at UCLA	Rose Bowl; Pasadena, CA (rivalry)	ABC	L 20–23 ^{OT}	53,825	
October 25	12:30 p.m.	Arizona	California Memorial Stadium; Berkeley, CA		W 42–14	33,249	
November 1	12:30 p.m.	at Arizona State	Sun Devil Stadium; Tempe, AZ		W 51–23	48,452	
November 8	7:00 p.m.	at Oregon	Autzen Stadium; Eugene, OR	TBS	L 17–21	57,511	
November 15	12:30 p.m.	Washington	California Memorial Stadium; Berkeley, CA		W 54–7	38,576	
November 22	12:30 p.m.	at Stanford	Stanford Stadium; Stanford, CA (Big Game)	ABC	W 28–16	67,950	
December 26	5:00 p.m.	vs. Virginia Tech*	Bank One Ballpark; Phoenix, AZ (Insight Bowl)	ESPN	W 52–49	42,364	
*Non-conference game; Rankings from AP Poll released prior to the game; All times are in Pacific time

== Game summaries ==
=== Vs. Kansas State ===
California vs. #7 Kansas State

Team	1	2	3	4	Total
Golden Bears	7	7	0	14	28
• Wildcats	10	17	8	7	42

- Date: August 23
- Location: Arrowhead Stadium, Kansas City, Missouri
- Game start: 6:45 p.m. CDT
- Game attendance: 50,823
- Television network: ESPN

Scoring summary
1	12:45	KSU	Darren Sproles 5-yard run (Joe Rheem kick)	KSU 7–0
1	10:39	Cal	Vincent Strang 34-yard pass from Reggie Robertson (Tyler Fredrickson kick)	Tied 7–7
1	6:29	KSU	Joe Rheem 22-yard field goal	KSU 10–7
2	7:37	KSU	Travis Wilson 5-yard pass from Ell Roberson (Rheem kick)	KSU 17–7
2	4:25	KSU	Joe Rheem 37-yard field goal	KSU 20–7
2	3:54	KSU	James Terry 52-yard pass from Ell Roberson (Rheem kick)	KSU 27–7
2	1:58	Cal	Geoff McArthur 65-yard pass from Reggie Robertson (Fredrickson kick)	KSU 27–14
3	8:46	KSU	Ell Roberson 11-yard run (Roberson run)	KSU 35–14
4	12:34	Cal	J. J. Arrington 22-yard pass from Aaron Rodgers (Fredrickson kick)	KSU 35–21
4	10:14	KSU	Davin Dennis 28-yard pass from Ell Roberson (Rheem kick)	KSU 42–21
4	4:27	Cal	J. J. Arrington 7-yard pass from Reggie Robertson (Fredrickson kick)	KSU 42–28

=== At Illinois ===
California at Illinois

Team	1	2	3	4	Total
• Golden Bears	7	14	7	3	31
Fighting Illini	7	0	7	10	24

- Date: September 20
- Location: Memorial Stadium, Champaign, Illinois
- Game start: 11:10 a.m. CDT
- Elapsed time: 3:23
- Game attendance: 58,363
- Game weather: Sunny, 63 °F (17 °C)
- Referee: Dave Witvoet

Scoring summary
1	7:46	ILL	E.B. Halsey 10-yard pass from Jon Beutjer (John Gockman kick)	ILL 7–0
1	3:31	Cal	J. J. Arrington 5-yard run (Tyler Fredrickson kick)	Tied 7–7
2	7:16	Cal	Geoff McArthur 14-yard pass from Aaron Rodgers (Tyler Fredrickson kick)	Cal 14–7
2	0:23	Cal	Vincent Strang 68-yard punt return (Tyler Fredrickson kick)	Cal 21–7
3	14:40	ILL	Kelvin Hayden 72-yard pass from Jon Beutjer (John Gockman kick)	Cal 21–14
3	9:29	Cal	Adimchinobe Echemandu 5-yard run (Tyler Fredrickson kick)	Cal 28–14
4	11:07	Cal	Tyler Fredrickson 32-yard field goal	Cal 31–14
4	7:27	ILL	E.B. Halsey 29-yard pass from Jon Beutjer (John Gockman kick)	Cal 31–21
4	1:44	ILL	John Gockman 34-yard field goal	Cal 31–24

=== USC ===
#3 USC at California

Team	1	2	3	4	OT	2OT	3OT	Total
USC	7	0	14	3	0	7	0	31
• California	7	14	0	3	0	7	3	34

- Date: September 27
- Location: California Memorial Stadium, Berkeley, California
- Game start: 6:30 p.m. EST
- Source: ESPN

Scoring summary
1	11:02	CAL	Aaron Rodgers 3 yard run (Tyler Frederickson kick)	CAL 7-0
1	2:47	USC	Dominique Byrd 27 yard pass from Matt Leinart (Ryan Killeen kick)	Tied 7-7
2	14:12	CAL	Garrett Cross 2 yard pass from Aaron Rodgers (Tyler Frederickson kick)	CAL 14-7
2	8:09	CAL	Burl Toler 27 yard pass from Aaron Rodgers (Tyler Frederickson kick)	CAL 21-7
3	7:26	USC	LenDale White 6 yard run (Ryan Killeen kick)	CAL 21-14
3	7:16	USC	Lofa Tatupu 26 yard interception return (Ryan Killeen kick)	Tied 21-21
4	9:04	CAL	Tyler Frederickson 51 yard field goal	CAL 24-21
4	0:16	USC	Ryan Killeen 33 yard field goal	Tied 24-24
2OT		CAL	Jonathan Makonnen 20 yard pass from Reggie Robertson (Tyler Frederickson kick)	CAL 31-24
2OT		USC	Keary Colbert 10 yard pass from Matt Leinart (Ryan Killeen kick)	Tied 31-31
3OT		CAL	Tyler Frederickson 38 yard field goal	CAL 34-31

- "They always take us lightly", said receiver Jonathan Makonnen, who had seven catches for 104 yards. "They really don't respect us. They're a talented team, but they were kind of lackadaisical out there."
- "I'm not knocking Leinart or their running backs, but I didn't see a whole lot of firepower from them", said Echemandu, the first player to rush for 100 yards against USC in 16 games. "Mike Williams is basically their whole offense."
- The loss was USC's last until the 2006 National Championship Game, in which Texas snapped USC's 34-game win streak.
- Aaron Rodgers was the starter as Cal's quarterback, but due to injury he was replaced in the second half by Reggie Robertson.

=== Washington ===
Team	1	2	3	4	Total
Washington	0	7	0	0	7
• California	13	20	7	14	54

- Date: November 15
- Location: Memorial Stadium, Berkeley, California
- Game start: 12:30 p.m. EST

Scoring summary
1	14:42	CAL	Geoff McArthur 79 yard pass from Aaron Rodgers (Tyler Frederickson kick)	California 7–0
1	9:39	CAL	Tyler Frederickson 20 yard field goal	California 10–0
1	2:36	CAL	Tyler Frederickson 20 yard field goal	California 13–0
2	14:45	CAL	Brandon Hall 13 yard pass from Aaron Rodgers (run failed)	California 19–0
2	12:06	WASH	Zach Tuiasosopo 3 yard run (Evan Knudson kick)	California 19–7
2	11:26	CAL	Vincent Strang 12 yard pass from Aaron Rodgers (Tyler Frederickson kick)	California 26–7
2	9:04	CAL	J.J. Arrington 15 yard run (Tyler Frederickson kick)	California 33–7
3	10:30	CAL	Aaron Rodgers 1 yard run (Tyler Frederickson kick)	California 40–7
4	11:59	CAL	Marcus O'Keith 48 yard run (Tyler Frederickson kick)	California 47–7
4	2:44	CAL	Michael Porter 51 yard run (Tyler Frederickson kick)	California 54–7

=== Stanford ===
California at Stanford

Team	1	2	3	4	Total
• California	0	0	7	21	28
Stanford	10	0	0	6	16

- Date: November 22
- Location: Stanford Stadium, Stanford, California
- Game start: 3:30 p.m. EST
- Source: ESPN

Scoring summary
1	12:30	STAN	Michael Sgroi 22 yard field goal	STAN 3-0
1	10:03	STAN	Luke Powell 24 yard pass from Chris Lewis (Michael Sgroi kick)	STAN 10-0
3	11:03	CAL	Geoff McArthur 44 yard pass from Aaron Rodgers (Tyler Frederickson kick)	STAN 10-7
4	14:55	CAL	Vincent Strang 14 yard pass from Aaron Rodgers (Tyler Frederickson kick)	CAL 14-10
4	10:07	CAL	Geoff McArthur 21 yard pass from Aaron Rodgers (Tyler Frederickson kick)	CAL 21-10
4	1:39	CAL	Adimchinobe Echemandu 17 yard run (Tyler Frederickson kick)	CAL 28-10
4	0:00	STAN	Mark Bradford 20 yard pass from Chris Lewis (pass failed)	CAL 28-16

- CAL: Aaron Rodgers 26/37, 359 yds
- CAL: Geoff McArthur 16 rec, 245 yds (single game record – Dameane Douglas, 1998)
- CAL: bowl eligible for first time since 1996

== Roster ==
2003 California Golden Bears football team roster
Players
Coaches
Offense

Pos.	#	Name	Class
QB	8	Aaron Rodgers	So
RB	18	Adimchinobe Echemandu	Sr
RB	30	J. J. Arrington	Jr
OL	61	Ryan O'Callaghan	So
OL	63	Mark Wilson	Sr

Defense

Pos.	#	Name	Class
S	20	Matt Giordano	Jr
DB	21	Donnie McCleskey	So
CB	22	Tim Mixon	Fr
DE	90	Ryan Riddle	Jr
DE	91	Monte Parson	Sr
DT	99	L. P. Ladouceur	Jr

Special teams

Pos.	#	Name	Class

Head coach

- Jeff Tedford

Coordinators/assistant coaches

Legend

- (C) Team captain
- (S) Suspended
- (I) Ineligible
- Injured
- Redshirt

Roster
Last update: 2003-12-13
