= Christian Vincent =

Christian Vincent may refer to:

- Christian Vincent (director) (born 1955), French film director
- Christian Vincent (actor) (born 1980), Canadian-American dancer, choreographer, actor and model

== See also ==
- Christopher Vincent, a disambiguation page
- Chris Vincent, a disambiguation page
