= 2003 Washington Huskies football team =

American college football season

2003 Washington Huskies football
- Conference: Pacific-10 Conference
- Record: 6–6 (4–4 Pac-10)
- Head coach: Keith Gilbertson (1st season)
- Offensive coordinator: John Pettas (1st season)
- Offensive scheme: Spread
- Defensive coordinator: Tim Hundley (5th season)
- Co-defensive coordinator: Phil Snow (1st season)
- Base defense: Multiple
- MVPs: Reggie Williams (offense); Charles Frederick (offense); Derrick Johnson (defense)
- Captains: Greg Carothers; Cody Pickett; Tank Johnson
- Home stadium: Husky Stadium

2003 Pacific-10 Conference football standings
	Conf.			Overall
Team	W		L	W		L
No. 1 USC $	7	–	1	12	–	1
No. 9 Washington State	6	–	2	10	–	3
Oregon	5	–	3	8	–	5
California	5	–	3	8	–	6
Oregon State	4	–	4	8	–	5
Washington	4	–	4	6	–	6
UCLA	4	–	4	6	–	7
Arizona State	2	–	6	5	–	7
Stanford	2	–	6	4	–	7
Arizona	1	–	7	2	–	10
$ – Conference champion; Rankings from AP Poll

The 2003 Washington Huskies football team was an American football team that represented the University of Washington during the 2003 NCAA Division I-A football season. In its first season under head coach Keith Gilbertson, the team compiled a 6–6 record, finished in a three-way tie for fifth place in the Pacific-10 Conference at 4–4, and was outscored by opponents 316 to 312.

== Schedule ==
Date	Time	Opponent	Rank	Site	TV	Result	Attendance	Source
August 30	12:30 p.m.	at No. 2 Ohio State*	No. 17	Ohio Stadium; Columbus, OH (College GameDay)	ABC	L 9–28	105,078	
September 6	1:00 p.m.	Indiana*	No. 22	Husky Stadium; Seattle, WA	FSN	W 38–13	71,125	
September 20	1:00 p.m.	Idaho*	No. 21	Husky Stadium; Seattle, WA	FSN	W 45–14	71,178	
September 27	12:30 p.m.	Stanford	No. 18	Husky Stadium; Seattle, WA	FSN	W 28–17	71,875	
October 4	3:30 p.m.	at UCLA	No. 18	Rose Bowl; Pasadena, CA	FSN	L 16–46	68,319	
October 11	12:30 p.m.	Nevada*		Husky Stadium; Seattle, WA	FSN	L 17–28	70,149	
October 18	7:00 p.m.	at No. 22 Oregon State		Reser Stadium; Corvallis, OR	TBS	W 38–17	37,034	
October 25	12:30 p.m.	No. 5 USC		Husky Stadium; Seattle, WA	ABC	L 23–43	72,015	
November 1	7:00 p.m.	Oregon		Husky Stadium; Seattle, WA (rivalry)	TBS	W 42–10	72,450	
November 8	3:00 p.m.	at Arizona		Arizona Stadium; Tucson, AZ	FSN	L 22–27	48,319	
November 15	12:30 p.m.	at California		California Memorial Stadium; Berkeley, CA	FSN	L 7–54	38,576	
November 22	3:30 p.m.	No. 8 Washington State		Husky Stadium; Seattle, WA (Apple Cup)	FSN	W 27–19	74,549	
*Non-conference game; Rankings from AP Poll released prior to the game; All times are in Pacific time

== Roster ==
2003 Washington Huskies football team roster
Players
Coaches
Offense

Pos.	#	Name	Class
RB	24	Rich Alexis	Sr
C	72	Todd Bachert	Sr
TE	89	Ben Bandel	Fr
OT	65	Khalif Barnes	Jr
G	76	Dan Dicks	Jr
WR	10	Charles Frederick	So
RB	8	Kenny James	Fr
OT	67	Nick Newton	Sr
QB	15	Casey Paus	So
QB	3	Cody Pickett (C)	Sr
WR	21	Sonny Shackelford	Fr
SB	4	Isaiah Stanback	Fr
FB	5	Zach Tuiasosopo	Jr
G	63	Clay Walker	Fr
WR	1	Reggie Williams	Jr

Defense

Pos.	#	Name	Class
CB	3	Roc Alexander	Sr
SS	27	Evan Benjamin	So
LB	34	Greg Carothers (C)	Sr
LB	88	Marquis Cooper	Sr
{{{pos}}}	5	Sam CharlesGaytonpos=CB	Jr
DE	22	Ty Eriks	So
LB	35	Tim Galloway	Jr
DE	56	Manase Hopoi	Jr
CB	21	Derrick Johnson	Jr
DE	99	Tank Johnson (C)	Sr
DT	91	Danny Mateaki	Fr
FS	26	Jimmy Newell	Jr
DT	59	Jerome Stevens	Sr

Special teams

Pos.	#	Name	Class
P	37	Garth Erickson	Sr
PK	10	Evan Knudson	Jr

Head coach

- Keith Gilbertson (1st year)

Coordinators/assistant coaches

- Randy Hart (AHC, DL)
- John Pettas (OC, QB)
- Tim Hundley (co-DC, LB)
- Phil Snow (co-DC, CB)
- Dan Cozzetto (OL)
- Chuck Heater (RB)
- Cornell Jackson (S)
- Bobby Kennedy (WR)
- Scott Pelluer (TE, ST)

Legend

- (C) Team captain
- (S) Suspended
- (I) Ineligible
- Injured
- Redshirt

== NFL draft ==
Four Huskies were selected in the 2004 NFL draft, which lasted seven rounds (255 selections).

Player	Position	Round	Overall	Franchise
Reggie Williams	WR	1st	9	Jacksonville Jaguars
Tank Johnson	DT	2nd	47	Chicago Bears
Marquis Cooper	LB	3rd	79	Tampa Bay Buccaneers
Cody Pickett	QB	7th	217	San Francisco 49ers
