= Christopher Vincent Stanich =

New Zealand master mariner, harbourmaster, and waterfront controller

Christopher Vincent Stanich (1902–1987) was a New Zealand master mariner, harbourmaster and waterfront controller. He was born in Sydney, New South Wales, Australia in 1902.
