= Cody Pickett =

American gridiron football player (born 1980)

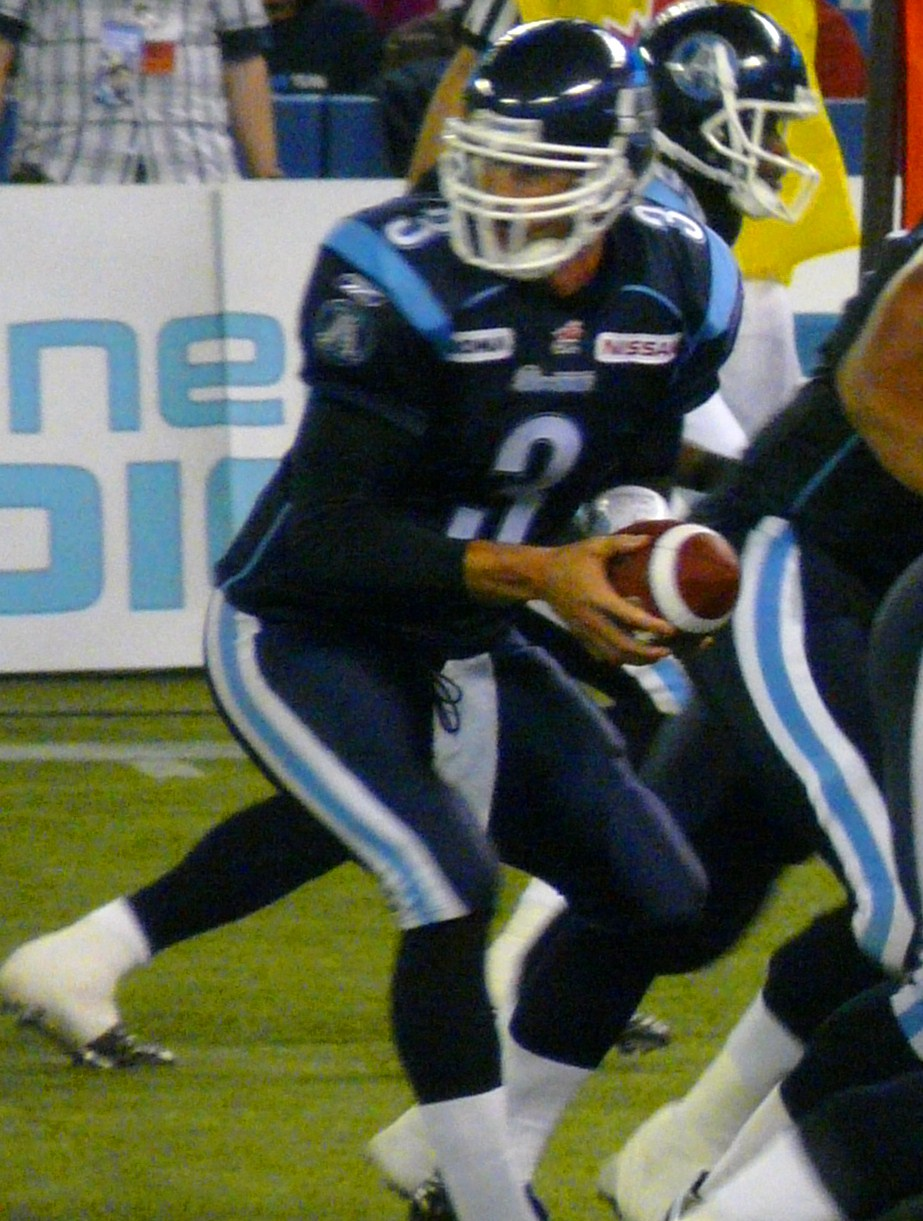
- Pickett with the Toronto Argonauts in 2008

No. 3
- Position: Quarterback

Personal information
- Born: June 30, 1980 (age 46); Caldwell, Idaho, U.S.
- Listed height: 6 ft 3 in (1.91 m)
- Listed weight: 227 lb (103 kg)

Career information
- High school: Caldwell
- College: Washington
- NFL draft: 2004: 7th round, 217th overall pick

Career history
- San Francisco 49ers (2004–2005); Houston Texans (2006)*; Rhein Fire (2007); Oakland Raiders (2007)*; Toronto Argonauts (2007–2009); Montreal Alouettes (2010); Calgary Stampeders (2010)
- * Offseason or practice squad member only

Awards and highlights
- 2× Second-team All-Pac-10 (2002, 2003)

Career NFL statistics
- Passing attempts: 45
- Passing completions: 18
- Completion percentage: 40.0%
- TD–INT: 0–4
- Passing yards: 195
- Passer rating: 16.4
- Stats at Pro Football Reference

Career CFL statistics
- TD–INT: 4–5
- Passing yards: 2,163
- Stats at CFL.ca (archived)

Cody J. Pickett (born June 30, 1980) is an American former professional football player who was a quarterback in the National Football League (NFL) and Canadian Football League (CFL). He played college football for the Washington Huskies and was selected in the seventh round of the 2004 NFL draft by the San Francisco 49ers.

== Early life ==
Born and raised on a ranch in Caldwell, Idaho, Pickett was a four-sport athlete at Caldwell High School and graduated in 1999. He lettered in football, basketball, golf, and rodeo, in which he was a national champion. Originally recruited by Jim Lambright at Washington, Pickett accepted a scholarship from new head coach Rick Neuheisel to play for the Huskies.

Pickett's family home was located off Chicken Dinner Road, near Caldwell.

== College career ==
As a true freshman at Washington in 1999, Pickett was the backup to starter Marques Tuiasosopo and saw limited action; he was granted a medical redshirt for an ailing back in the last half of the season. He was the backup again to Tuiasosopo in 2000; the Huskies went 11–1, won the Rose Bowl over Purdue, and finished third in the final polls.

Pickett was the starting quarterback at UW for three seasons from 2001–03, where his primary target was wide receiver Reggie Williams. Rather than enter the 2003 NFL draft in the spring, Pickett chose to return to Washington for his senior season at age 23. His senior season saw a head coaching change, as Neuheisel was dismissed in the summer of 2003 and replaced with Keith Gilbertson. He was considered a Heisman Trophy candidate and written up in Sports Illustrated, but a shoulder injury that year hurt his chances.

Pickett held the Huskies' single-season record for passing yards (4,458) from 2002 until 2022, when Michael Penix Jr. passed for 4,641 yards. However, Pickett played 12 games in 2002 while Penix played 13 games in 2022, so Pickett holds the single-season record for passing yards per game.

=== Awards and honors ===
- Honorable mention Academic All-Pac-10 (2000)
- Honorable mention All-Pac-10 (2001)
- Huskies Offensive Most Valuable Player (2002)
- Second-team All-Pac-10 (2002)
- Honorable mention SI All-American (2002)
- Honorable mention CollegeFootballNews.com All-American (2002)

== Professional career ==
Pre-draft measurables
Height	Weight	Arm length	Hand span	40-yard dash	10-yard split	20-yard split	20-yard shuttle	Three-cone drill	Vertical jump	Broad jump	Wonderlic
6 ft 3 1/2 in (1.92 m)	233 lb (106 kg)	31 3/8 in (0.80 m)	9 5/8 in (0.24 m)	4.81 s	1.71 s	2.78 s	4.30 s	7.19 s	30.5 in (0.77 m)	9 ft 1 in (2.77 m)	20
All values from NFL Combine

Pickett was selected in the seventh round (217th overall) of the 2004 NFL draft by the San Francisco 49ers. Pickett started the 2005 season as the fourth-string quarterback, but became the starter after Tim Rattay was traded, and Alex Smith and Ken Dorsey were injured. Pickett played on special teams most of the season, an unusual role for a quarterback. He also played safety and wide receiver during practice.

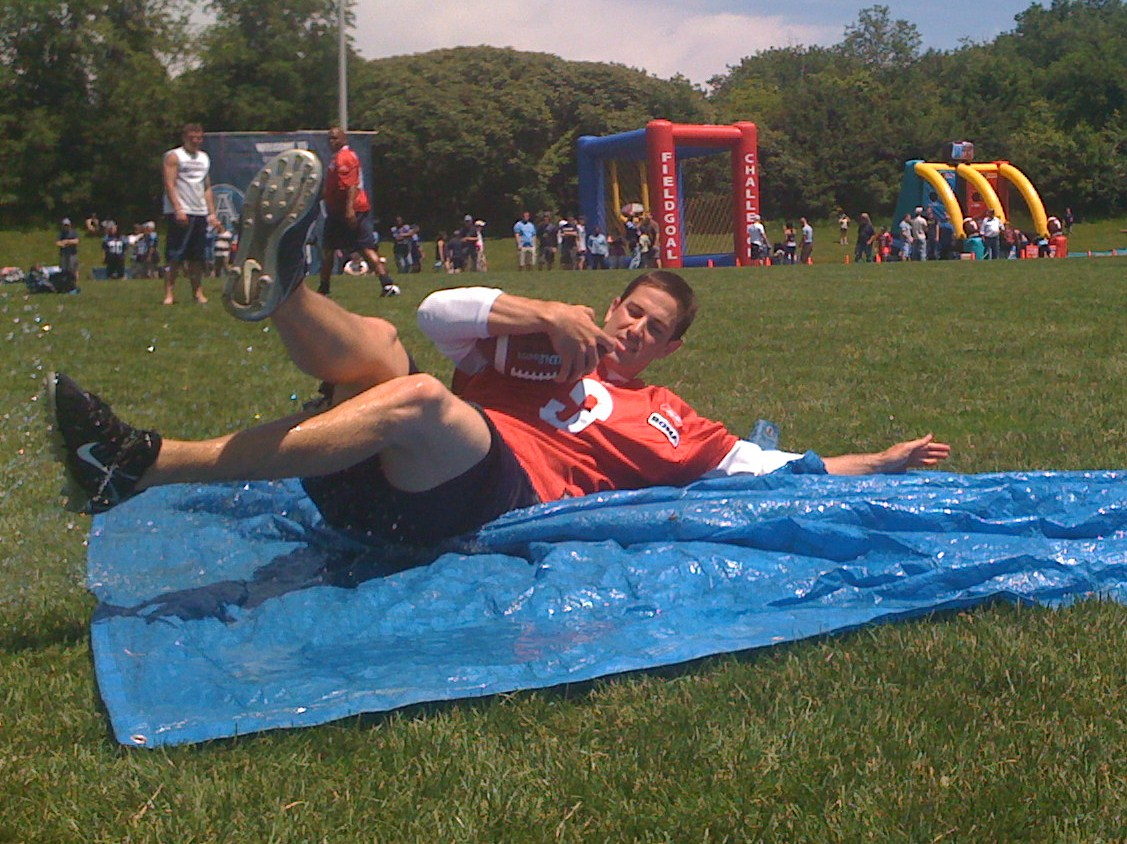
Pickett demonstrates a quarterback slide at a 2009 Argonauts training camp fan day.

Pickett was traded on July 27, 2006, to the Houston Texans for a conditional draft pick in the 2007 NFL draft. He was released by the Texans on September 1, 2006. Pickett was selected to the 2007 Rhein Fire NFL Europe team as a free agent and was their starting quarterback.

In July 2007, the Oakland Raiders signed Pickett to a one-year contract, but released him on August 1.

On September 18, 2007, Pickett was signed as a free agent by the Toronto Argonauts of the CFL. Pickett made his first CFL game appearance on September 12, 2008, against the visiting Winnipeg Blue Bombers at Rogers Centre in relief of starting quarterback Kerry Joseph. He made his first CFL start on September 20, 2008, against the Calgary Stampeders at McMahon Stadium.

On August 11, 2009, head coach Bart Andrus named Cody Pickett as the starting quarterback for the team's next game, against the B.C. Lions.

On February 21, 2010, Pickett was released by the Argonauts. On March 8, 2010, Pickett was signed by the Montreal Alouettes. On June 7, 2010, Cody Pickett was released by the Montreal Alouettes. On June 15, 2010, Pickett was signed by the Calgary Stampeders.

Following the 2010 CFL season, Pickett retired from pro football and returned to Idaho.

== Career statistics ==
=== NFL ===
Year	Team	GP	GS	Passing								Rushing			
Year	Team	GP	GS	Cmp	Att	Pct	Yds	Y/A	TD	Int	Rtg	Att	Yds	Avg	TD
2004	SF	1	0	4	10	40.0	55	5.5	0	2	18.7	1	5	5.0	0
2005	SF	5	2	14	35	40.0	140	4.0	0	2	28.3	13	42	3.2	0
Career		6	2	18	45	40.0	195	4.3	0	4	16.4	14	47	3.4	0

=== College ===
Year	Team	Passing								Rushing			
Year	Team	Cmp	Att	Pct	Yds	Y/A	TD	Int	Rtg	Att	Yds	Avg	TD
1999	Washington	0	4	0.0	0	0.0	0	1	-50.0	0	0	0.0	0
2000	Washington	1	2	50.0	12	6.0	0	0	100.4	0	0	0.0	0
2001	Washington	169	301	56.1	2,403	8.0	10	14	124.9	83	60	0.7	5
2002	Washington	365	612	59.6	4,458	7.3	28	14	131.4	86	-185	-2.2	3
2003	Washington	257	454	56.6	3,043	6.7	15	13	118.1	80	-60	-0.8	3
Career		792	1,373	57.7	9,916	7.2	53	42	125.0	249	-186	-0.7	11

== Personal life ==
Pickett's father is Dee Pickett, a championship roper on professional rodeo circuit and the 1984 World Champion Cowboy, inducted into the ProRodeo Hall of Fame in August 2003. Dee also played college football; a junior college transfer, he was the starting quarterback at Boise State in 1976 and 1977.

In a May 21, 1990 edition of Sports Illustrated, the letters to the editor page published a letter from Pickett, then aged 9, expressing his boyhood admiration for Michael Jordan and excitement over receiving a custom-made Jordan quilt for Christmas. A picture of Pickett was included and printed in the issue, alongside the letter.

In the offseason, Pickett coached his younger sister's basketball team, Team 208, a travel team representing the Boise, Idaho area. He is the current head coach for the Eagle High School boys basketball team in Eagle, Idaho.

== See also ==
- Washington Huskies football statistical leaders
