= Chris Vincent (American football) =

American football player (born 1981)

Profile
- Position: Running back

Personal information
- Born: September 3, 1981 (age 45); Philadelphia, Pennsylvania, U.S.
- Listed height: 6 ft 1 in (1.85 m)
- Listed weight: 224 lb (102 kg)

Career information
- College: Oregon
- NFL draft: 2007: undrafted

Career history
- Detroit Lions (2007)*; Arizona Cardinals (2008–2009)*
- * Offseason or practice squad member only

Christopher Adam Vincent (born September 3, 1981) is an American former football running back.

Vincent attended Neshaminy High School in Langhorne, Pennsylvania and was enrolled at Valley Forge Military Academy for a Prep year. He signed with Louisiana State University and signed a letter of intent in February before transferring to the University of Oregon later in the year. He was signed by the Detroit Lions as an undrafted free agent in 2007. Vincent was also a member of the Arizona Cardinals.
