= Andrew Walter =

American football player (born 1982)

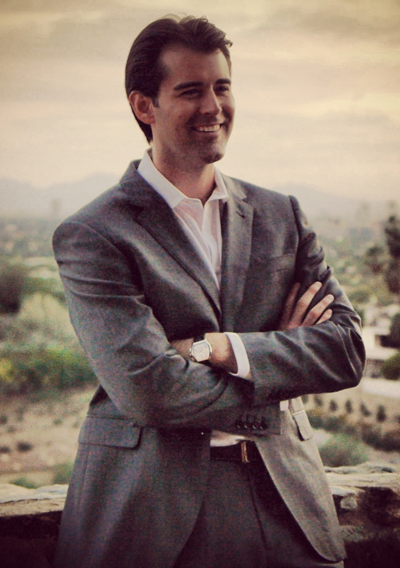
- Walter in 2013

No. 16
- Position: Quarterback

Personal information
- Born: May 11, 1982 (age 44); Phoenix, Arizona, U.S.
- Listed height: 6 ft 6 in (1.98 m)
- Listed weight: 230 lb (104 kg)

Career information
- High school: Grand Junction (Grand Junction, Colorado)
- College: Arizona State (2000–2004)
- NFL draft: 2005: 3rd round, 69th overall pick

Career history
- Oakland Raiders (2005–2008); New England Patriots (2009)*
- * Offseason or practice squad member only

Awards and highlights
- Second-team All-Pac-10 (2004)

Career NFL statistics
- Passing attempts: 333
- Passing completions: 174
- Completion percentage: 52.3%
- TD–INT: 3–16
- Passing yards: 1,919
- Passer rating: 52.6
- Stats at Pro Football Reference

Andrew Scott Walter (born May 11, 1982) is an American former professional football player who was a quarterback in the National Football League (NFL). He played college football for the Arizona State Sun Devils and was selected by the Oakland Raiders in the third round of the 2005 NFL draft. He was also a member of the New England Patriots. After his playing career, he ran for office in the Arizona House of Representatives.

== Early life ==
Walter is an Arizona native, born in Phoenix. He moved to Colorado at the age of 10, where he later attended Grand Junction High School in Grand Junction, Colorado. He was an all-conference selection as a junior and senior and a USA Today honorable mention All-American.

== College career ==
Prior to his NFL career, Walter played quarterback for his hometown school, Arizona State University (ASU) where he earned a BA in communication. Walter completed his collegiate career with numerous Pacific-10 Conference records including, most career touchdowns (85) and most yards passing in a game (536). He also set numerous school records, which include most passing yards (10,616), most completions (777), most touchdowns (85), and total offense (10,142).

=== 2001 season ===
Walter's redshirt freshman season at Arizona State University saw limited playing time behind sophomore starter Jeff Krohn, including reserve duty in a losing effort against the University of Oregon. After a 4–7 record under new head coach Dirk Koetter and only one win in the Pacific-10 Conference, Krohn transferred out of ASU following the season.

=== 2002 season ===
With an opening at quarterback, Walter seemed to be the favorite going into the season to start. This turned out not to be the case, however, when Walter was kept as the backup after redshirt freshman, Chad Christiansen, had impressive spring and fall practices.

In September 2002 the Sun Devils fell behind the San Diego State University Aztecs 22–0. Christiansen was largely ineffective and was replaced by Walter. Walter entered the game with a protective boot due to an injury he sustained during the previous week of practice. The injury did not prove to be a factor as Walter connected with wide receiver Shaun McDonald for a 72-yard touchdown pass on his first play from scrimmage. Walter's second pass from scrimmage also ended up as a touchdown. ASU came back to beat the Aztecs, 39–28, in the largest come-from-behind win in ASU history.

Later in the season, ASU put together an impressive win streak, and beat No. 6 Oregon at Autzen Stadium in Eugene, Oregon, where the Ducks had lost only one game at Autzen over the previous four seasons. After falling behind 21–0 in the second quarter, Walter led the Sun Devils to a 45–42 upset win over the Ducks, breaking a Pac-10 single game record for passing with 536 yards.

ASU ended the regular season with an 8–5 record and nearly upset the Kansas State Wildcats, who were favored by 17 points over the Devils, in the 2002 Holiday Bowl. Although ASU narrowly lost the contest 34–27 (relinquishing the lead only once, in the closing minute of the game), Walter achieved the ASU single season passing record with 3,877 yards.

=== 2003 season ===
2003 was marked as a disappointing season for Walter and the Sun Devils. ASU started the season ranked at No. 15 but put up disappointing performances against traditionally weaker opponents Northern Arizona University and Utah State University. The Sun Devils suffered their first loss at the University of Iowa, losing 21–2 to the Hawkeyes. Despite the Sun Devils achieving a 5–7 record (2–6 in the Pac-10), Walter still threw for 3,044 yards, including the game-winning touchdown against North Carolina as time expired. Walter also earned the Territorial Cup MVP when ASU beat their arch-rivals the University of Arizona at Sun Devil Stadium. At the end of the 2003 season, Walter decided to forgo his opportunity to jump into the NFL and decided to stay at Arizona State for his last year of eligibility.

=== 2004 season ===
Walter's senior campaign featured a number of highs and lows. Walter lead the Sun Devils to a comeback year where the Devils piled up an 8–3 record and clinched a berth in the Vitalis Sun Bowl. Walter also surpassed practically every ASU quarterback in every statistic. Walter also surpassed NFL legend John Elway as the Pac-10's all time touchdown leader. During the 2004 season, Walter helped the Devils defeat No. 15 Iowa 44–7. His low point of the season came when Walter went down in the fourth quarter during the regular season finale against Arizona and suffered a third degree shoulder separation, forcing him to miss the Sun Devils' post-season Sun Bowl game (a 27–23 victory over Purdue).

== Professional career ==
Pre-draft measurables
Height	Weight	40-yard dash
6 ft 6 1/8 in (1.98 m)	233 lb (106 kg)	4.86 s
All values from NFL Combine/Pro Day

=== Oakland Raiders ===
Walter was selected by the Oakland Raiders in the third round (69th overall) of the 2005 NFL draft. Walter spent his 2005 rookie season as the third-string quarterback for the Raiders behind Kerry Collins and backup quarterback Marques Tuiasosopo. Walter played in only two preseason games because of a groin injury, one that eventually required surgery at the conclusion of the 2005 season.

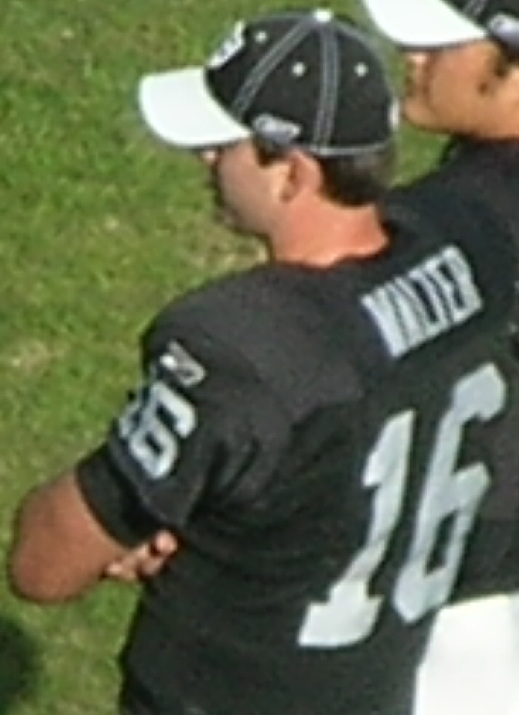
Walter in 2008

Entering the 2006 season, Walter was expected to compete for the starting quarterback position with Tuiasosopo and Aaron Brooks. After a poor performance by Brooks in Week 1, Walter replaced him late in the game. The next week, Walter once again replaced Brooks due to poor performance including two fumbled snaps. Following the announcement that Brooks would miss 2–4 weeks with an injured pectoral muscle, Walter started the Week 4 game against the Cleveland Browns. On October 22, he led the Raiders to their first win of the year, defeating the Arizona Cardinals. However, Brooks returned in November and re-took the starting quarterback job from Walter, who would only start one more game in 2006. After the season, the Raiders drafted JaMarcus Russell with the first overall pick in the 2007 NFL draft. Walter would begin the season as the Raiders' third quarterback, with veterans Daunte Culpepper and Josh McCown seeing time over Walter, who was only active for one game in 2007. Walter was listed as the No. 2 quarterback heading into the December 9 game against the Green Bay Packers. Walter entered the Packers game early in the fourth quarter in relief of McCown and completed 5 of 8 passes for 38 yards as the Raiders lost to the Packers by a score of 38–7. Walter was inserted into the game instead of rookie JaMarcus Russell, who had made his NFL debut a week earlier, due to head coach Lane Kiffin not wanting to play Russell when the offense was performing poorly. It was also apparently the coldest weather Russell had ever been in.

With Russell taking the starting job in 2008, Walter continued to serve as the Raiders' third quarterback. He was active for just two games in 2008, starting one but posting only a 43.8 completion percentage. Walter was released by the Raiders on July 30, 2009, finishing his Oakland career with a 52.3 completion percentage.

=== New England Patriots ===
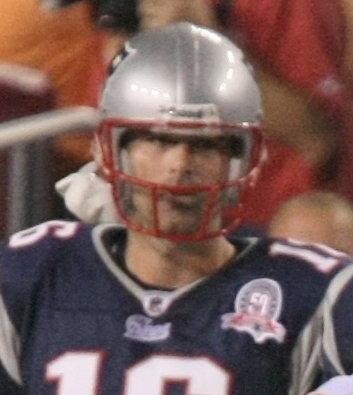
Walter in 2009

Walter was signed by the New England Patriots on August 3, 2009 after the team waived quarterback Matt Gutierrez. He was released on September 4.

== Career statistics ==
=== NFL ===
Year	Team	Games			Passing								Rushing				Sacks		Fumbles (Note: Fumbles lost data taken from Pro Football Reference career game log)	
Year	Team	GP	GS	Record	Cmp	Att	Pct	Yds	Y/A	TD	Int	Rtg	Att	Yds	Avg	TD	Sck	SckY	Fum	Lost
2005	OAK	0	0	DNP																
2006	OAK	12	8	2–6	147	276	53.3	1,677	6.1	3	13	55.8	14	30	2.1	0	46	256	13	7
2007	OAK	1	0	–	5	8	62.5	38	4.8	0	0	74.0	0	0	0.0	0	0	0	0	0
2008	OAK	2	1	0–1	22	49	44.9	204	4.2	0	3	31.3	5	19	3.8	0	5	39	2	0
Career		15	9	2–7	174	333	52.3	1,919	5.8	3	16	52.6	19	49	2.6	0	51	295	15	7

=== College ===
Season	Team	Passing								Rushing			
Season	Team	Cmp	Att	Pct	Yds	Y/A	TD	Int	Rtg	Att	Yds	Y/A	TD
2001	Arizona State	38	86	44.2	546	6.3	3	2	104.4	28	−22	−0.8	0
2002	Arizona State	274	483	56.7	3,877	8.0	28	15	137.1	56	-216	-3.9	0
2003	Arizona State	221	421	52.5	3,044	7.2	24	10	127.3	33	-125	-3.8	0
2004	Arizona State	244	426	57.3	3,150	7.4	30	9	138.4	58	-112	-1.9	0
Career		777	1,416	54.9	10,617	7.5	85	36	132.6	175	-475	-2.7	0

== Post-football career ==
After his NFL career ended at age 27, Walter was the first player to participate in the NFL Player Development Internship Program in commercial real estate at CB Richard Ellis in Phoenix. Walter then returned to Arizona State University to earn an MBA from the W.P. Carey School of Business.

Walter lost in the 2014 Republican primary election against Wendy Rogers for the House of Representatives seat in Arizona's 9th congressional district.
