= 2003–04 NCAA football bowl games =

College football postseason game series

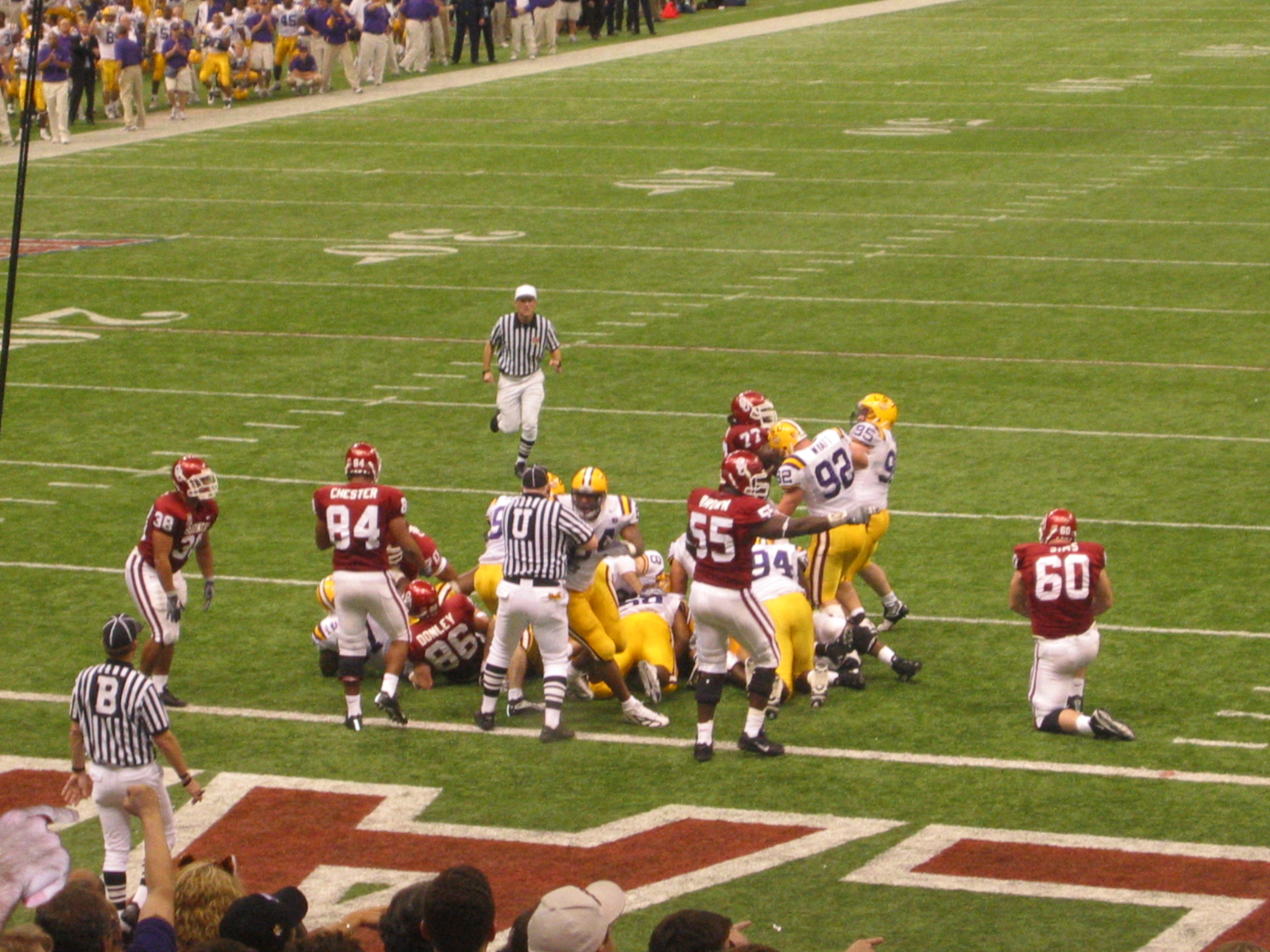
- Gameplay during the BCS National Championship Sugar Bowl for the 2003 season
- Season: 2003
- Number of bowls: 28
- All-star games: 5
- Bowl games: December 16, 2003 – January 4, 2004
- National Championship: 2004 Sugar Bowl
- Location of Championship: Louisiana Superdome, New Orleans, Louisiana
- Champions: LSU Tigers (BCS/Coaches) & USC Trojans (AP)
- Bowl Challenge Cup winner: ACC
Bowl record by conference
Conference	Bowls	Record	Final AP poll
Big Ten	8	3–5 (0.375)	5
Big 12	8	2–6 (0.250)	5
SEC	7	5–2 (0.714)	5
ACC	6	5–1 (0.833)	2
Pac-10	6	4–2 (0.667)	2
Big East	5	2–3 (0.400)	2
Conference USA	5	1–4 (0.200)	1
WAC	4	3–1 (0.750)	1
Mountain West	3	1–2 (0.333)	1
MAC	2	2–0 (1.000)	1
Sun Belt	1	0–1 (0.000)	0
Independents	1	0–1 (0.000)	0

The 2003–04 NCAA football bowl games were a series of 28 post-season games (including the Bowl Championship Series) played in December 2003 and January 2004 for Division I-A football teams and their all-stars. The post-season began with the New Orleans Bowl on December 16, 2003, and concluded on January 31, 2004, with the season-ending Gridiron Classic.

A total of 28 team-competitive games, and two all-star games, were played. To fill the 56 available bowl slots, four teams with non-winning seasons participated in bowl games—all four had a .500 (6–6) season. While teams that did not have winning seasons were invited to bowl games, seven teams with winning records were left out: Northern Illinois (10–2); Connecticut (9-3); Marshall and Toledo (both 8–4); Air Force and Akron (both 7–5); and South Florida (7–4).

== Poll rankings ==
The below table lists top teams (per polls taken after the completion of the regular season and any conference championship games), their win–loss records (prior to bowl games), and the bowls they later played in. The AP column represents rankings per the AP Poll, while the BCS column represents the Bowl Championship Series rankings.

AP	BCS	Team	W–L	Bowl
1	3	USC Trojans	11–1	Rose Bowl †
2	2	LSU Tigers	12–1	Sugar Bowl †
3	1	Oklahoma Sooners	12–1	Sugar Bowl †
4	4	Michigan Wolverines	10–2	Rose Bowl †
5	6	Texas Longhorns	10–2	Holiday Bowl
6	8	Tennessee Volunteers	10–2	Peach Bowl
7	5	Ohio State Buckeyes	10–2	Fiesta Bowl †
8	10	Kansas State Wildcats	11–3	Fiesta Bowl †
9	7	Florida State Seminoles	10–2	Orange Bowl †
10	9	Miami Hurricanes	10–2	Orange Bowl †
11	12	Georgia Bulldogs	10–3	Capital One Bowl
12	14	Purdue Boilermakers	9–3	Capital One Bowl
13	13	Iowa Hawkeyes	9–3	Outback Bowl
14	11	Miami (Ohio) RedHawks	12–1	GMAC Bowl
15	—	Washington State Cougars	9–3	Holiday Bowl
16	—	Ole Miss Rebels	9–3	Cotton Bowl Classic
17	15	Florida Gators	8–4	Outback Bowl
18	—	Boise State Broncos	12–1	Fort Worth Bowl
19	—	TCU Horned Frogs	11–1	Fort Worth Bowl
20	—	West Virginia Mountaineers	8–4	Gator Bowl
21	—	Oklahoma State Cowboys	9–3	Cotton Bowl Classic
22	—	Nebraska Cornhuskers	9–3	Alamo Bowl
23	—	Maryland Terrapins	9–3	Gator Bowl
24	—	Minnesota Golden Gophers	9–3	Sun Bowl
25	—	Utah Utes	9–2	Liberty Bowl

† denotes a BCS bowl game

== Schedule ==
Non BCS Contests
Date	Game	Site	Time (US EST)	TV	Matchup (pre-game record)	AP pre-game rank	USA Today pre-game rank
12/16	New Orleans Bowl	Louisiana Superdome; New Orleans, Louisiana	7 PM	ESPN2	Memphis 27 (8–4), North Texas 17 (9–3)	NR; NR	NR; NR
12/18	GMAC Bowl	Ladd–Peebles Stadium; Mobile, Alabama	7:30 PM	ESPN2	Miami (Ohio) 49 (12–1), Louisville 28 (9–3)	#14; NR	#15; NR
12/22	Tangerine Bowl	Citrus Bowl; Orlando, Florida	5:30 PM	ESPN	North Carolina State 56 (7–5), Kansas 26 (6–6)	NR; NR	NR; NR
12/23	Fort Worth Bowl	Amon G. Carter Stadium; Fort Worth, Texas	7:30 PM	ESPN2	Boise State 34 (12–1), TCU 31 (11–1)	#18 #19	#16 #19
12/24	Las Vegas Bowl	Sam Boyd Stadium; Whitney, Nevada	7:30 PM	ESPN	Oregon State 55 (7–5), New Mexico 14 (8–4)	NR; NR	NR; NR
12/25	Hawai'i Bowl	Aloha Stadium; Honolulu, Hawaii	8:00 PM	ESPN	Hawaii 54 (8–5), Houston 48 (7–5)	NR; NR	NR; NR
12/26	Motor City Bowl	Ford Field; Detroit, Michigan	5:00 PM	ESPN	Bowling Green 28 (10–3), Northwestern 24 (6–6)	NR; NR	NR; NR
12/26	Insight Bowl	Bank One Ballpark; Phoenix, Arizona	8:30 PM	ESPN	California 52 (7–6), Virginia Tech 49 (8–4)	NR; NR	NR; NR
12/27	Continental Tire Bowl	Bank of America Stadium; Charlotte, North Carolina	11:00 AM	ESPN2	Virginia 23 (7–5), Pittsburgh 16 (8–4)	NR; NR	NR; NR
12/29	Alamo Bowl	Alamodome; San Antonio, Texas	9:00 PM	ESPN	Nebraska 17 (9–3), Michigan State 3 (8–4)	#22; NR	#21; NR
12/30	Houston Bowl	Reliant Stadium; Houston, Texas	4:30 PM	ESPN	Texas Tech 38 (7–5), Navy 14 (8–4)	NR; NR	NR; NR
12/30	Holiday Bowl	Qualcomm Stadium; San Diego, California	8:00 PM	ESPN	Washington State 28 (9–3), Texas 20 (10–2)	#15 #5	#14 #5
12/30	Silicon Valley Football Classic	Spartan Stadium; San Jose, California	10:30 PM	ESPN2	Fresno State 17 (8–5), UCLA 9 (6–6)	NR; NR	NR; NR
12/31	Music City Bowl	LP Field; Nashville, Tennessee	12:00 PM	ESPN	Auburn 28 (7–5), Wisconsin 14 (7–5)	NR; NR	NR; NR
12/31	Sun Bowl	Sun Bowl Stadium; El Paso, Texas	2:00 PM	CBS	Minnesota 31 (9–3), Oregon 30 (8–4)	#24; NR	#20; NR
12/31	Liberty Bowl	Liberty Bowl Memorial Stadium; Memphis, Tennessee	3:30 PM	ESPN	Utah 17 (9–2), Southern Miss 0 (9–3)	#25; NR	#25; NR
12/31	Independence Bowl	Independence Stadium; Shreveport, Louisiana	7:30 PM	ESPN	Arkansas 27 (8–4), Missouri 14 (8–4)	NR; NR	NR; NR
12/31	San Francisco Bowl	Pacific Bell Park; San Francisco, California	10:30 PM	ESPN2	Boston College 32 (7–5), Colorado State 21 (7–5)	NR; NR	NR; NR
1/1	Outback Bowl	Raymond James Stadium; Tampa, Florida	11:00 AM	ESPN	Iowa 37, (9–3); Florida 17 (8–4)	#13 #17	#12 #17
1/1	Gator Bowl	Alltel Stadium; Jacksonville, Florida	12:30 PM	NBC	Maryland 41, (9–3); West Virginia 7 (8–4)	#23 #20	#24 #23
1/1	Capital One Bowl	Citrus Bowl; Orlando, Florida	1:00 PM	ABC	Georgia 34, (10–3); Purdue 27 (9–3)	#11 #12	#11 #13
1/2	Cotton Bowl Classic	Cotton Bowl; Dallas, Texas	2:00 PM	FOX	Mississippi 31, (9–3); Oklahoma State 28 (9–3)	#16 #21	#18 #22
1/2	Peach Bowl	Georgia Dome; Atlanta, Georgia	4:30 PM	ESPN	Clemson 27 (8–5), Tennessee 14 (10–2)	NR #6	NR #7
1/3	Humanitarian Bowl	Bronco Stadium; Boise, Idaho	12 PM	ESPN	Georgia Tech 52 (6–6), Tulsa 10 (8–4)	NR; NR	NR; NR
Bowl Championship Series
Date	Game	Site	Time (US EST)	TV	Matchup	AP rank	BCS rank
1/1	Rose Bowl	Rose Bowl; Pasadena, California	4:30 PM	ABC	USC 28 (11–1) (Pac-10 Champion), Michigan (Big Ten Champion) 14 (10–2)	#1 #4	#3 #4
1/1	Orange Bowl	Dolphin Stadium; Miami Gardens, Florida	8:30 PM	ABC	Miami 16 (10–2) (Big East Champion), Florida State (ACC Champion) 14 (10–2)	#10 #9	#9 #7
1/2	Fiesta Bowl	Sun Devil Stadium; Tempe, Arizona	8 PM	ABC	Ohio State 35 (10–2), Kansas State 28 (11–3) (Big 12 Champion)	#7 #8	#5 #10
1/4	Sugar Bowl (BCS National Championship Game)	Louisiana Superdome; New Orleans, Louisiana	8 PM	ABC	LSU 21 (12–1) (SEC Champion), Oklahoma 14 (12–1)	#2 #3	#2 #1

== Conference bowl representation ==
Conference	Bowl Appearances					Top 25 (December 7 Polls)			
Conference	#	Record	%	Winners	Losers	#	Teams	AP Rank	CP Rank
Mid-American	2	2–0	1.000	Miami (Ohio); Bowling Green		1	Miami (Ohio)	#14	#15
ACC	6	5–1	0.833	Maryland; Georgia Tech; Clemson; NC State; Virginia	Florida State	2	Florida State	#9	#8
ACC	6	5–1	0.833	Maryland; Georgia Tech; Clemson; NC State; Virginia	Florida State	2	Maryland	#23	#24
Western Athletic	4	3–1	0.750	Boise State; Hawaii; Fresno State	Tulsa	1	Boise State	#18	#16
SEC	7	5–2	0.714	LSU; Georgia; Mississippi; Auburn; Arkansas	Tennessee; Florida	5	LSU	#2	#2
SEC	7	5–2	0.714	LSU; Georgia; Mississippi; Auburn; Arkansas	Tennessee; Florida	5	Tennessee	#6	#7
SEC	7	5–2	0.714	LSU; Georgia; Mississippi; Auburn; Arkansas	Tennessee; Florida	5	Georgia	#11	#11
SEC	7	5–2	0.714	LSU; Georgia; Mississippi; Auburn; Arkansas	Tennessee; Florida	5	Mississippi	#16	#18
SEC	7	5–2	0.714	LSU; Georgia; Mississippi; Auburn; Arkansas	Tennessee; Florida	5	Florida	#17	#17
Pac-10	6	4–2	0.667	USC; Washington State; Oregon State; California	Oregon; UCLA	2	USC	#1	#1
Pac-10	6	4–2	0.667	USC; Washington State; Oregon State; California	Oregon; UCLA	2	Washington State	#15	#14
Big East	5	2–3	0.400	Miami; Boston College	West Virginia; Virginia Tech; Pittsburgh	2	Miami	#10	#9
Big East	5	2–3	0.400	Miami; Boston College	West Virginia; Virginia Tech; Pittsburgh	2	West Virginia	#20	#23
Big 10	8	3–5	0.375	Ohio State; Iowa; Minnesota	Michigan; Purdue; Michigan State; Wisconsin; Northwestern	5	Michigan	#4	#4
Big 10	8	3–5	0.375	Ohio State; Iowa; Minnesota	Michigan; Purdue; Michigan State; Wisconsin; Northwestern	5	Ohio State	#7	#6
Big 10	8	3–5	0.375	Ohio State; Iowa; Minnesota	Michigan; Purdue; Michigan State; Wisconsin; Northwestern	5	Iowa	#13	#12
Big 10	8	3–5	0.375	Ohio State; Iowa; Minnesota	Michigan; Purdue; Michigan State; Wisconsin; Northwestern	5	Purdue	#12	#13
Big 10	8	3–5	0.375	Ohio State; Iowa; Minnesota	Michigan; Purdue; Michigan State; Wisconsin; Northwestern	5	Minnesota	#24	#20
Mountain West	3	1–2	0.333	Utah	New Mexico; Colorado State	1	Utah	#25	#25
Big 12	8	2–6	0.250	Nebraska; Texas Tech	Oklahoma; Texas; Kansas State; Oklahoma State; Kansas; Missouri	5	Oklahoma	#3	#3
Big 12	8	2–6	0.250	Nebraska; Texas Tech	Oklahoma; Texas; Kansas State; Oklahoma State; Kansas; Missouri	5	Texas	#5	#5
Big 12	8	2–6	0.250	Nebraska; Texas Tech	Oklahoma; Texas; Kansas State; Oklahoma State; Kansas; Missouri	5	Kansas State	#8	#10
Big 12	8	2–6	0.250	Nebraska; Texas Tech	Oklahoma; Texas; Kansas State; Oklahoma State; Kansas; Missouri	5	Nebraska	#22	#21
Big 12	8	2–6	0.250	Nebraska; Texas Tech	Oklahoma; Texas; Kansas State; Oklahoma State; Kansas; Missouri	5	Oklahoma State	#21	#22
Conference USA	5	1–4	0.200	Memphis	TCU; Louisville; Houston; Southern Miss	1	TCU	#19	#19
Sun Belt	1	0–1	0.000		North Texas	0	none		
Independents	1	0–1	0.000		Navy	0	none		

== All-star games ==
Date	Game	Winning Team		Losing Team		Venue	City
January 10, 2004	East–West Shrine Game	West Team	28	East Team	7	SBC Park	San Francisco, California
January 17, 2004	Las Vegas All-American Classic	West Team	14	East Team	7	Sam Boyd Stadium	Las Vegas, Nevada
January 17, 2004	Hula Bowl	South (Aina)	26	North (Kai)	7	War Memorial Stadium	Wailuku, Hawaii
January 24, 2004	Senior Bowl	South Team	28	North Team	10	Ladd–Peebles Stadium	Mobile, Alabama
January 31, 2004	Gridiron Classic	North All-Stars	35	South All-Stars	31	The Villages Polo Stadium	The Villages, Florida
