= Gregg Brandon =

American football coach (born 1956)

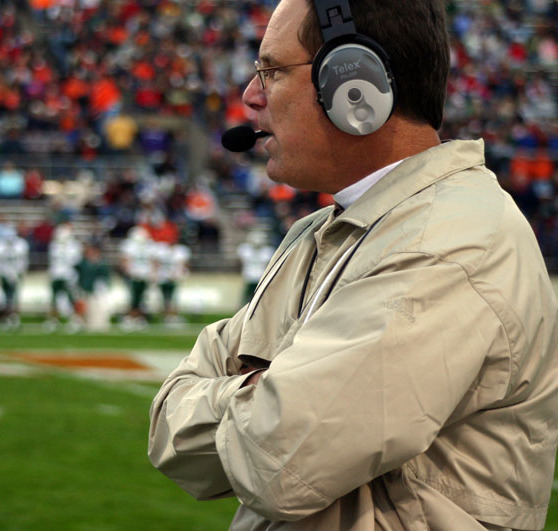

Biographical details
- Born: February 29, 1956 (age 70); Tucson, Arizona, U.S.

Playing career
- 1974: Mesa
- 1975–1977: Northern Colorado
- Position: Wide receiver

Coaching career (HC unless noted)
- 1978–1980: Ellicott HS (CO)
- 1981–1984: Weber State (TE/ST)
- 1985: Weber State (LB)
- 1986: Weber State (WR/TE)
- 1987–1990: Wyoming (WR)
- 1991: Utah State (LB)
- 1992–1998: Northwestern (WR)
- 1999–2000: Colorado (WR)
- 2001–2002: Bowling Green (AHC/OC)
- 2003–2008: Bowling Green
- 2009: Virginia (OC)
- 2010: Las Vegas Locomotives (TE)
- 2011–2012: Wyoming (OC/QB)
- 2013–2014: New Mexico State (OC/QB)
- 2015–2021: Colorado Mines
- 2024: Cologne Centurions

Head coaching record
- Overall: 103–45 (college)
- Bowls: 2–1
- Tournaments: 4–4 (NCAA D-II playoffs)

Accomplishments and honors

Championships
- 4 RMAC (2016, 2018, 2019, 2021); 1 UFL (2010)

Gregg Brandon (born February 29, 1956) is an American college football coach and former player. He was most recently the head football coach at the Colorado School of Mines, a position he had held from 2015 until his retirement after the 2021 season. Prior to that, he was the offensive coordinator at New Mexico State University and coached tight ends in the United Football League (UFL) for the Las Vegas Locomotives. He also spent two years as the offensive coordinator at the University of Wyoming and was offensive coordinator for the Virginia Cavaliers for the duration of the 2009 season. He was head coach for the Bowling Green Falcons, but was fired following the conclusion of the 2008 season, after six years at the helm, which included three bowl appearances and shares of two division titles. Brandon had previously been an assistant coach and offensive coordinator at Bowling Green under head coach Urban Meyer before Meyer left for the University of Utah in 2003.

== Playing career ==
Brandon played football at Air Academy High School in Colorado Springs, Colorado. He went on to compete at the collegiate level as both a defensive back and wide receiver at Mesa College—now known as Colorado Mesa University—in 1974 and the University of Northern Colorado from 1975 to 1977. He graduated from Northern Colorado in 1978 with a bachelor's degree in education.

== Coaching career ==
=== Early career ===
Brandon began his coaching career as head football coach at Ellicott High School in Ellicott, Colorado. He spent three seasons there, 1978 to 1980, before joining the college ranks at Weber State University, under Mike Price, where he coached the next six seasons, 1981 to 1986. He coached the tight ends and special teams in his first four seasons, the linebackers in his fifth year and the receivers and tight ends during his final year in Ogden.

In 1987 was then named receivers coach at Wyoming, where he worked the next four years, 1987 to 1990. During his tenure with head coach Paul Roach, the Cowboys posted a 35–15 record, including a 16–0 run in Western Athletic Conference play in 1987 and 1988, and played in three bowls (1987 Holiday Bowl, 1988 Holiday Bowl, and 1990 Copper Bowl). In 1991, he returned to the state of Utah, where he coached the linebackers for one season at Utah State.

The following year, Brandon joined the Northwestern staff as receivers coach. He was also Northwestern's recruiting coordinator for his last two seasons there (1997–1998). In his seven seasons at Northwestern, Brandon assembled an extremely talented group of receivers, including D'Wayne Bates, the second all-time leading receiver in Big Ten history. Bates was a semifinalist for the Biletnikoff Award and an All-America candidate. Brandon returned to the West, spending two seasons at Colorado under Gary Barnett, where he coached the receivers and kickoff return units both years and was the team's passing-game coordinator in 2000 and recruiting coordinator in 1999.

=== Bowling Green ===
Brandon joined the Falcons as an assistant head coach and offensive coordinator following the 2000 season under head coach Urban Meyer. Following Meyer's departure to Utah in 2002, Gregg Brandon was named the 16th head football coach in Bowling Green's history.

In his first season as Bowling Green's head coach, Brandon lead the Falcons to an 11–3 record, a national ranking. and an appearance in the 2003 MAC Championship Game, where they lost the Miami RedHawks at Doyt Perry Stadium. The Falcons were invited to a bowl game, defeating Northwestern, 28–24 at the Motor City Bowl at Ford Field in Detroit, Michigan.

The following season, Brandon went 9–3 including taking the Falcons to a second consecutive bowl game, defeating Memphis 52–35 at the 2004 GMAC Bowl in Mobile, Alabama. The Falcons finished 6–5 in 2005 after losing a hard-fought game against arch rival, Toledo in multiple overtimes, a game that had the Falcons won would have sent them to their second MAC Championship and then potentially to a bowl game for the third straight year.

Brandon suffered his first and only losing season in 2006, finishing 4–8 including losses to rivals Kent State, Miami (OH), and Toledo, as well as becoming the first team to lose to Temple in 20-games. Brandon's Falcons put the prior season behind them as they posted an 8–5 record during their 2007 campaign earning a share of the MAC East Division title, but missing out on the opportunity to play in the MAC Championship game due to a tiebreaker. Brandon led the team to its third bowl under his tenure, losing to Tulsa, 63–7, in the GMAC Bowl.

Coming into the 2008 season, the Falcons were picked to be the beast of the MAC East and were projected to reach the MAC Championship Game as well as their second straight bowl game. However, the Falcons had a disappointing campaign, going 6–6. Following the Falcons double-overtime loss in their home finale against Buffalo, Brandon showed irritation with the fans for their poor attendance at the game as it had championship implications. Despite being bowl eligible and winning their first road contest at arch rival Toledo since 1994, Brandon was fired by athletic director Greg Christopher after six years as Bowling Green's head coach and posting a 44–30 record.

=== Virginia ===
On December 18, 2008, Brandon accepted the position of offensive coordinator at the University of Virginia, replacing Mike Groh (son of then current Virginia head coach, Al Groh), who stepped down a week before Brandon's hiring. Brandon had been named a leading candidate for the position soon after Groh's resignation.

=== Colorado School of Mines ===
On December 29, 2014, Brandon became the head football coach of the Colorado School of Mines. Brandon is the first ever School of Mines coach to lead the team to the National Semifinals in Division 2.

In 2021, Brandon was accused of barging into a civil engineering lecture by professor Ning Lu with a group and harassing the professor and nearly 100 students by blowing a whistle, turning off the projector, and shouting at everyone to get out so the team could use the room. An HR representative and the school's sports director, David Hasburg, later apologized, in person, to Lu's class for the incident. Brandon retained his position.

Brandon announced his retirement as head coach in January 2022.

=== Cologne Centurions ===
In 2024, Brandon named head coach of the Cologne Centurions of the European League of Football. He was replaced part way through the season by defensive coordinator Jag Bal.

== Family ==
Brandon is married to the former Robyn Mitchell and has two sons.

== Head coaching record ==
=== College ===
Year	Team	Overall	Conference	Standing	Bowl/playoffs	Coaches/AFCA^{#}	AP^{°}
Bowling Green Falcons (Mid-American Conference) (2003–2008)
2003	Bowling Green	11–3	7–2	1st (West)	W Motor City	23	23
2004	Bowling Green	9–3	6–2	3rd (West)	W GMAC		
2005	Bowling Green	6–5	5–3	2nd (East)			
2006	Bowling Green	4–8	3–5	4th (East)			
2007	Bowling Green	8–5	6–2	T–1st (East)	L GMAC		
2008	Bowling Green	6–6	4–4	T–2nd (East)			
Bowling Green:		44–30	33–20				
Colorado Mines Orediggers (Rocky Mountain Athletic Conference) (2015–2021)
2015	Colorado Mines	8–3	6–3	T–3rd			
2016	Colorado Mines	10–3	8–2	T–1st	L NCAA Division II Second Round	15	
2017	Colorado Mines	7–4	7–3	3rd			
2018	Colorado Mines	10–2	9–1	T–1st	L NCAA Division II First Round	18	
2019	Colorado Mines	12–1	10–0	1st	L NCAA Division II Second Round	8	
2020–21	No team—COVID-19						
2021	Colorado Mines	12–2	8–1	T–1st	L NCAA Division II Semifinal	3	
Colorado Mines:		59–15	48–10				
Total:		103–45					
National championship Conference title Conference division title or championship game berth
