= Alan Gooch =

American sports executive (born c. 1960)

Biographical details
- Born: c. 1960

Playing career
- 1978: Sterling
- 1981–1982: UCF
- Position: Defensive back

Coaching career (HC unless noted)
- 1983–1985: UCF (DB)
- 1986–1997: UCF (RB)
- 1998–2003: UCF (AHC)
- 2003: UCF (interim HC)

Head coaching record
- Overall: 0–2

Accomplishments and honors

Awards
- AFCA NCAA Division I-A Assistant COY (1997)

Alan Gooch (born c. 1960) is an American sports executive and former college football coach. He is the executive director of the Orlando Sports Foundation (OSF), which raises funds and awareness for cancer research and sponsors the Cure Bowl, a bowl game played each December in Orlando, Florida. Gooch spent most of this coaching career as an assistant at his alma mater, the University of Central Florida (UCF). In 1997, he was the inaugural recipient of the AFCA NCAA Division I-A Assistant Football Coach of the Year. Gooch served as the interim head coach for the final two games of UCF's 2003 season following the dismissal of Mike Kruczek.

== Early life and playing career ==
Gooch graduated in 1978 from Clearwater High School in Clearwater, Florida, where he played high school football as a linebacker and running back. He accepted a scholarship to play college football at Sterling College in Sterling, Kansas under head coach Les Unruh. As a freshman in 1978, Gooch saw playing time for the Sterling Warriors at free safety following an injury to fellow Clearwater native Tim Mann. Gooch returned to Florida to attend the University of Central Florida (UCF), where he lettered for the UCF Knights football team in 1981 and 1982. Following his senior season in 1982, he was invited to try out for the Pittsburgh Maulers of the United States Football League (USFL).

== Coaching career ==
Gooch's began coaching at UCF in 1983. He initially coached the team's defensive backs before later mentoring the running backs and serving as recruiting coordinator. In 1997, the American Football Coaches Association (AFCA) honored Gooch as the inaugural AFCA NCAA Division I-A Assistant Football Coach of the Year. He gained attention that season when he learned sign language to communicate with Dwight Collins, a deaf running back for the UCF Knights. Collins and Gooch were recognized at ESPN's annual ESPY Awards in December 1997, in which Collins received The Most Courageous Player Award.

Gooch served as the interim head football coach for the final two games of UCF's 2003 season following the dismissal of Mike Kruczek. With Gooch at the helm, UCF lost two home games to close out the season, to Marshall on November 19 and to the No. 15-ranked Miami RedHawks, led by quarterback Ben Roethlisberger on November 28.

Gooch has the distinction of being one of only two NCAA Division I-A.FBS coaches to rise from player to assistant coach and to head coach without leaving their alma mater. Gooch was inducted into the UCF Athletics Hall of Fame in 2006, and in 2007 he was named "Educator of the Decade" by the UCF College of Education.

== Business and philanthropy career ==
In 2007, Gooch founded Tizon Commercial, LLC, a consortium of real estate professionals representing clients in investor acquisitions, dispositions, leasing, and tenant services, both domestically and internationally. He presently is on the board of directors of the Cure Bowl.

== Head coaching record ==
Year	Team	Overall	Conference	Standing	Bowl/playoffs
UCF Knights (Mid-American Conference) (2002)
2003	UCF	0–2	0–2	5th (East)	
UCF:		0–2	0–2		
Total:		0–2			
