= 2003 Motor City Bowl =

Northwestern Wildcats	Bowling Green Falcons
(6–6)	(10–3)
Big Ten	MAC
24	28
Head coach: Randy Walker	Head coach: Gregg Brandon
	AP / Coaches / BCS; NR / NR / 24
	1	2	3	4	Total
Northwestern	7	3	7	7	24
Bowling Green	0	7	7	14	28
- Date: December 26, 2003
- Season: 2003
- Stadium: Ford Field
- Location: Detroit, Michigan
- MVP: Josh Harris; Jason Wright
- Favorite: Northwestern by 12.5
- Referee: Jerome Boger (C-USA)
- Attendance: 51,286

United States TV coverage
- Network: ESPN
- Announcers: Dave Barnett (Play-by-Play); Rod Gilmore (Analyst)

The 2003 Motor City Bowl was a post-season college football bowl game between the Northwestern Wildcats and the Bowling Green Falcons on December 26, 2003, at Ford Field in Detroit, Michigan. Northwestern led early after shutting down Bowling Green's running game but Bowling Green made a comeback in the second half led by a strong passing game under quarterback Josh Harris and won 28–24. It was the seventh time the Motor City Bowl had been played and the final game of the 2003 NCAA Division I FBS football season for both teams.

The game between the Mid-American Conference (MAC) team Bowling Green and Big Ten Conference Northwestern was played at neutral-site Ford Field. As then organized the Motor City Bowl matched a MAC team and a team from either the Big Ten, the Big East Conference, or an at-large team. Bowling Green accepted a bid for the Motor City Bowl after losing to Miami (OH) in the MAC Championship Game. It was Bowling Green's first appearance in a bowl game since the 1992 Las Vegas Bowl. Northwestern was the first Big Ten team to play in the Motor City Bowl and had not appeared in a bowl game since the 2000 Alamo Bowl. Bowling Green and Northwestern last played each other on November 17, 2001, a meeting that Bowling Green won 42–43.

The Motor City Bowl was one of two bowl appearances by the MAC; the other was by Miami in the 2003 GMAC Bowl. Miami defeated Louisville 49–28, making the MAC 2–0 in bowl games that year. Unusually for the Motor City Bowl there were two MVPs: Bowling Green quarterback Josh Harris and Northwestern running back Jason Wright. Harris passed for 386 yards, including three touchdown passes, and rushed for Bowling Green's fourth touchdown. Harris' completion record of 38/50 and total offense of 454 yards set Motor City Bowl records. Wright had 21 carries for 237 yards, including a 77-yard touchdown run which was the second-longest in Motor City Bowl history.
