= Jeff Woodruff =

American football player and coach (born 1957)

Current position
- Title: Head coach
- Team: Andress HS (TX)

Biographical details
- Born: February 22, 1957 (age 69); Ravenna, Ohio, U.S.
- Education: Kent State University (1979)

Playing career
- 1978: Kent State
- Positions: Quarterback, punter

Coaching career (HC unless noted)
- 1979: Kent State (GA)
- 1980–1982: Washington (GA)
- 1983: Nevada (DB)
- 1984–1991: Washington (QB)
- 1992–1993: Washington (OC)
- 1996–1997: Cholla HS (AZ)
- 1998–1999: Arizona (RB)
- 2000–2003: Eastern Michigan
- 2004–2006: UTEP (TE)
- 2007–2011: UTEP (Asst. HC/TE)
- 2012–2013: Oaks Christian School (CA)
- 2015–present: Andress HS (TX)

Head coaching record
- Overall: 9–34 (college)

Jeffrey Allen Woodruff (born February 22, 1957) is an American football coach, currently the head coach at Andress High School in El Paso, Texas. He was the head coach at Eastern Michigan University, the assistant head coach and tight ends coach at the University of Texas at El Paso, and the head coach of Oaks Christian School in Westlake Village, California.

== Coaching career ==
A quarterback and punter at Kent State University, Woodruff began his coaching career at his alma mater as a graduate assistant and tight ends coach in 1979. He joined the University of Washington staff in Seattle as a graduate assistant under head coach Don James in 1980, then moved to the University of Nevada in 1983 for a season as the secondary coach and recruiting coordinator. Woodruff returned to the UW staff in 1984 as quarterbacks coach as the Huskies won the Orange Bowl; the undefeated 1991 team won a second consecutive Rose Bowl and shared the national title. He succeeded Keith Gilbertson as the Huskies' offensive coordinator in 1992 under James and continued in 1993 under new head coach Jim Lambright.

After leaving the Washington program in January 1994, Woodruff moved to Arizona and was the head coach at Cholla High School in Tucson, then joined the University of Arizona staff as an assistant in 1998 under head coach Dick Tomey.

Woodruff was hired as head coach at Eastern Michigan University in 2000 and compiled a 9–34 (.209) record in four seasons. The Eagles posted a 3–8 record in his first season, which turned out to be the best of his tenure. Following a 38–10 loss to Central Michigan in 2003 on November 1, athletic director Dave Diles, Jr. fired Woodruff and stated, "Jeff Woodruff has helped develop our program with quality young men, but the team is not on the competitive level that we felt should be after four years."

After Eastern Michigan, Woodruff was hired by UTEP as tight ends coach for the Miners in 2004 under head coach Mike Price, and was elevated to assistant head coach in 2007.

== Head coaching record ==
=== College ===
Year	Team	Overall	Conference	Standing	Bowl/playoffs
Eastern Michigan Eagles (Mid-American Conference) (2000–2003)
2000	Eastern Michigan	3–8	2–5	5th (West)	
2001	Eastern Michigan	2–9	1–6	6th (West)	
2002	Eastern Michigan	3–9	1–7	7th (West)	
2003	Eastern Michigan	1–8	0–5	6th (West)	
Eastern Michigan:		9–34	4–23		
Total:		9–34			
