= 2003 MAC Championship Game =

2003 Marathon MAC Championship Game
- Conference Championship
Miami RedHawks	Bowling Green Falcons
(11–1)	(10–2)
49	27
Head coach: Terry Hoeppner	Head coach: Gregg Brandon
AP / Coaches / BCS; 14 / 15 / 11	AP / Coaches / BCS; 20 / 23 / 18
	1	2	3	4	Total
Miami	7	14	21	7	49
Bowling Green	7	10	3	7	27
- Date: December 4, 2003
- Season: 2003
- Stadium: Doyt Perry Stadium
- Location: Bowling Green, Ohio
- MVP: Ben Roethlisberger (QB, Miami)
- Favorite: Miami by 7
- Referee: Todd Geerlings
- Attendance: 24,813

United States TV coverage
- Network: ESPN2
- Announcers: Mike Tirico, Kirk Herbstreit, Lee Corso, Dr. Jerry Punch

2003 Mid-American Conference football standings
	Conf.			Overall
Team	W		L	W		L
East Division
No. 10 Miami (OH) x$	8	–	0	13	–	1
Marshall	6	–	2	8	–	4
Akron	5	–	3	7	–	5
Kent State	4	–	4	5	–	7
UCF	2	–	6	3	–	9
Ohio	1	–	7	2	–	10
Buffalo	1	–	7	1	–	11
West Division
No. 23 Bowling Green x	7	–	1	11	–	3
Northern Illinois	6	–	2	10	–	2
Toledo	6	–	2	8	–	4
Western Michigan	4	–	4	5	–	7
Ball State	3	–	5	4	–	8
Eastern Michigan	2	–	6	3	–	9
Central Michigan	1	–	7	3	–	9
Championship: Miami 49, Bowling Green 27
$ – Conference champion; x – Division champion/co-champions; Rankings from AP Poll

The 2003 MAC Championship Game was played on December 4, 2003 at Doyt Perry Stadium in Bowling Green, Ohio. The game featured the winner of each division of the Mid-American Conference. The game featured the Miami RedHawks, of the East Division, and the Bowling Green Falcons, of the West Division. The RedHawks beat the Falcons 49–27. Miami quarterback Ben Roethlisberger threw for a game-record 440 yards in the process.

To date, this is the last MAC Championship game to be hosted by one of the schools involved. Subsequent contests have been played at Ford Field in Detroit.
