= 2004 NCAA football bowl games =

In college football, 2004 NCAA football bowl games may refer to:

- 2003–04 NCAA football bowl games, for games played in January 2004 as part of the 2003 season.
- 2004–05 NCAA football bowl games, for games played in December 2004 as part of the 2004 season.
