= 2003 Kent State Golden Flashes football team =

American college football season

2003 Kent State Golden Flashes football
- Conference: Mid-American Conference
- East
- Record: 5–7 (4–4 MAC)
- Head coach: Dean Pees (6th season)
- Offensive coordinator: Doug Martin (1st season)
- Offensive scheme: Spread
- Base defense: 4–3
- Home stadium: Dix Stadium

2003 Mid-American Conference football standings
	Conf.			Overall
Team	W		L	W		L
East Division
No. 10 Miami (OH) x$	8	–	0	13	–	1
Marshall	6	–	2	8	–	4
Akron	5	–	3	7	–	5
Kent State	4	–	4	5	–	7
UCF	2	–	6	3	–	9
Ohio	1	–	7	2	–	10
Buffalo	1	–	7	1	–	11
West Division
No. 23 Bowling Green x	7	–	1	11	–	3
Northern Illinois	6	–	2	10	–	2
Toledo	6	–	2	8	–	4
Western Michigan	4	–	4	5	–	7
Ball State	3	–	5	4	–	8
Eastern Michigan	2	–	6	3	–	9
Central Michigan	1	–	7	3	–	9
Championship: Miami 49, Bowling Green 27
$ – Conference champion; x – Division champion/co-champions; Rankings from AP Poll

The 2003 Kent State Golden Flashes football team represented the Kent State University during the 2003 NCAA Division I-A football season. Kent State competed as a member of the Mid-American Conference (MAC), and played their home games at Dix Stadium. The Golden Flashes were led by fifth-year head coach Dean Pees, who resigned following the conclusion of the season.

== Schedule ==
Date	Time	Opponent	Site	TV	Result	Attendance
August 28	7:30 pm	at Akron	Rubber Bowl; Akron, OH (Wagon Wheel)		W 41–38	26,814
September 6	7:00 pm	at No. 10 Pittsburgh*	Heinz Field; Pittsburgh, PA		L 3–43	56,531
September 13	6:00 pm	Youngstown State (I-AA)*	Dix Stadium; Kent, OH		W 16–13	20,172
September 20	1:00 pm	at Penn State*	Beaver Stadium; University Park, PA		L 10–32	102,078
September 27	2:00 pm	Central Florida	Dix Stadium; Kent, OH		W 36–16	6,728
October 4	2:00 pm	Ball State	Dix Stadium; Kent, OH		L 17–34	10,261
October 11	4:30 pm	at Marshall	Marshall University Stadium; Huntington, WV		L 33–49	33,537
October 18	2:00 pm	Connecticut*	Dix Stadium; Kent, OH		L 31–34 ^{OT}	8,228
October 24	2:00 pm	Miami (OH)	Dix Stadium; Kent, OH	ESPN Plus	L 30–38	10,693
November 8	2:00 pm	at Ohio	Peden Stadium; Athens, OH		W 37–33	14,827
November 15	6:00 pm	at No. 25 Bowling Green	Doyt Perry Stadium; Bowling Green, OH (Anniversary Award)		L 33–42	12,035
November 22	4:00 pm	Buffalo	Dix Stadium; Kent, OH		W 34–24	7,196
*Non-conference game; Rankings from AP Poll released prior to the game; All times are in Eastern time
