= 2003 Ohio Bobcats football team =

American college football season

2003 Ohio Bobcats football
- Conference: Mid-American Conference
- East
- Record: 2–10 (1–7 MAC)
- Head coach: Brian Knorr (3rd season)
- Offensive coordinator: Greg Gregory (3rd season)
- Defensive coordinator: Tim DeRuyter (2nd in stint; 6th overall season)
- Home stadium: Peden Stadium

2003 Mid-American Conference football standings
	Conf.			Overall
Team	W		L	W		L
East Division
No. 10 Miami (OH) x$	8	–	0	13	–	1
Marshall	6	–	2	8	–	4
Akron	5	–	3	7	–	5
Kent State	4	–	4	5	–	7
UCF	2	–	6	3	–	9
Ohio	1	–	7	2	–	10
Buffalo	1	–	7	1	–	11
West Division
No. 23 Bowling Green x	7	–	1	11	–	3
Northern Illinois	6	–	2	10	–	2
Toledo	6	–	2	8	–	4
Western Michigan	4	–	4	5	–	7
Ball State	3	–	5	4	–	8
Eastern Michigan	2	–	6	3	–	9
Central Michigan	1	–	7	3	–	9
Championship: Miami 49, Bowling Green 27
$ – Conference champion; x – Division champion/co-champions; Rankings from AP Poll

The 2003 Ohio Bobcats football team represented Ohio University during the 2003 NCAA Division I-A football season. Ohio competed as a member of the Mid-American Conference (MAC) in the East Division. The Bobcats were led by third year head coach Brian Knorr. They played their home games in Peden Stadium in Athens, Ohio.

== Schedule ==
Date	Time	Opponent	Site	TV	Result	Attendance
August 28	7:00 pm	Southeast Missouri State*	Peden Stadium; Athens, OH		W 17–3	10,173
September 6	2:00 pm	at Iowa State*	Jack Trice Stadium; Ames, IA		L 20–48	40,056
September 13	2:00 pm	Minnesota*	Peden Stadium; Athens, OH	ESPN+	L 20–42	20,227
September 27	4:00 pm	Western Michigan	Peden Stadium; Athens, OH		L 32–39	14,281
October 4	7:30 pm	at No. 17 Northern Illinois	Huskie Stadium; DeKalb, IL	ONN	L 23–30 ^{OT}	21,736
October 11	2:00 pm	UCF^{†}	Peden Stadium; Athens, OH	ONN	W 28–0	21,109
October 18	7:00 pm	at Kentucky*	Commonwealth Stadium; Lexington, KY	ESPNGP	L 14–35	61,107
October 25	1:00 pm	at Buffalo	University at Buffalo Stadium; Amherst, NY		L 17–26	4,423
November 8	2:00 pm	Kent State	Peden Stadium; Athens, OH		L 33–37	14,827
November 15	12:00 pm	at Akron	Rubber Bowl; Akron, OH		L 28–35	9,102
November 22	2:30 pm	No. 18 Miami (OH)	Peden Stadium; Athens, OH (Battle of the Bricks)	FSN	L 31–49	14,327
November 28	12:00 pm	at Marshall	Marshall University Stadium; Huntington, WV (Battle for the Bell)	FSN	L 0–28	19,113
*Non-conference game; ^{†}Homecoming; Rankings from AP Poll released prior to the game; All times are in Eastern time
