= 2003 Ball State Cardinals football team =

American college football season

2003 Ball State Cardinals football
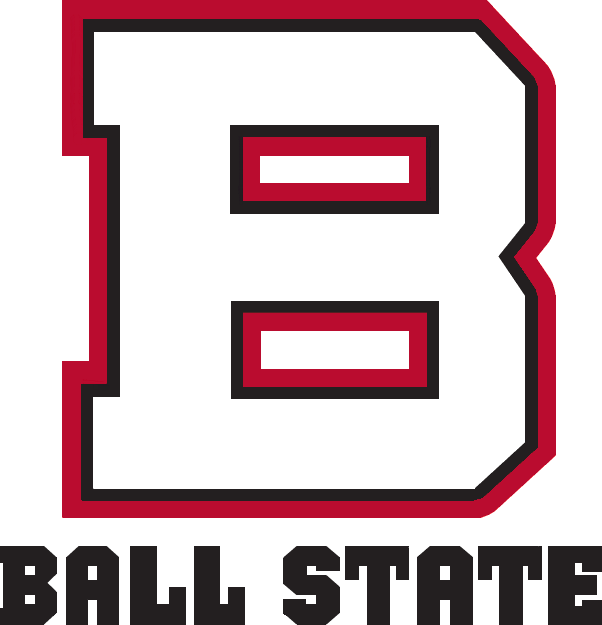
- Conference: Mid-American Conference
- West
- Record: 4–8 (3–5 MAC)
- Head coach: Brady Hoke (1st season)
- Offensive coordinator: Don Treadwell (1st season)
- Home stadium: Ball State Stadium

2003 Mid-American Conference football standings
	Conf.			Overall
Team	W		L	W		L
East Division
No. 10 Miami (OH) x$	8	–	0	13	–	1
Marshall	6	–	2	8	–	4
Akron	5	–	3	7	–	5
Kent State	4	–	4	5	–	7
UCF	2	–	6	3	–	9
Ohio	1	–	7	2	–	10
Buffalo	1	–	7	1	–	11
West Division
No. 23 Bowling Green x	7	–	1	11	–	3
Northern Illinois	6	–	2	10	–	2
Toledo	6	–	2	8	–	4
Western Michigan	4	–	4	5	–	7
Ball State	3	–	5	4	–	8
Eastern Michigan	2	–	6	3	–	9
Central Michigan	1	–	7	3	–	9
Championship: Miami 49, Bowling Green 27
$ – Conference champion; x – Division champion/co-champions; Rankings from AP Poll

The 2003 Ball State Cardinals football team represented Ball State University during the 2003 NCAA Division I-A football season. The Cardinals were led by Brady Hoke in his first season as the program's 14th head coach. The Cardinals played their home games at Ball State Stadium as members of the West Division of the Mid-American Conference (MAC). They finished the season 4–8, 3–5 in MAC play to finish in fourth place in the West Division.

== Schedule ==
Date	Opponent	Site	Result	Attendance
August 28	Indiana State*	Ball State Stadium; Muncie, IN (Blue Key Victory Bell)	W 31–7	23,549
September 6	Missouri*	Ball State Stadium; Muncie, IN	L 7–35	17,371
September 13	at No. 11 Pittsburgh*	Heinz Field; Pittsburgh, PA	L 21–42	44,117
September 20	Central Michigan	Ball State Stadium; Muncie, IN	W 27–14	10,289
September 27	at Boston College*	Alumni Stadium; Chestnut Hill, MA	L 29–53	42,353
October 4	at Kent State	Dix Stadium; Kent, OH	W 34–17	10,261
October 18	Miami (OH)	Ball State Stadium; Muncie, IN	L 3–49	18,396
October 25	Toledo	Ball State Stadium; Muncie, IN	W 38–14	10,327
November 1	at No. 21 Northern Illinois	Huskie Stadium; DeKalb, IL (rivalry)	L 23–48	24,121
November 8	at Western Michigan	Waldo Stadium; Kalamazoo, MI	L 20–28	8,662
November 15	at Eastern Michigan	Rynearson Stadium; Ypsilanti, MI	L 14–38	5,075
November 22	No. 22 Bowling Green	Ball State Stadium; Muncie, IN	L 14–41	8,325
*Non-conference game; Rankings from AP Poll released prior to the game
