= Mike DeBord =

American football coach (1956–2025)

Biographical details
- Born: February 7, 1956; Muncie, Indiana, U.S.
- Died: April 15, 2025 (aged 69)

Playing career
- 1975-1977: Manchester (IN)
- Position: Offensive lineman

Coaching career (HC unless noted)
- 1982–1983: Franklin (IN) (OL)
- 1984: Fort Hays State (OL)
- 1985–1986: Fort Hays State (OC/QB/WR)
- 1987–1988: Eastern Illinois (OL)
- 1988–1989: Ball State (OL)
- 1990–1991: Colorado State (OL)
- 1992: Northwestern (OL)
- 1993–1996: Michigan (OL)
- 1997–1999: Michigan (OC)
- 2000–2003: Central Michigan
- 2004–2005: Michigan (ST/RC)
- 2006–2007: Michigan (OC/TE)
- 2008: Seattle Seahawks (AOL)
- 2009: Seattle Seahawks (TE)
- 2010–2012: Chicago Bears (TE)
- 2015–2016: Tennessee (OC/QB)
- 2017–2018: Indiana (AHC/OC/TE)
- 2019: San Diego Fleet (OC)
- 2020: Michigan (OA)
- 2021: Kansas (OC/QB)

Administrative career (AD unless noted)
- 2013–2014: Michigan (sport admin)

Head coaching record
- Overall: 12–34

Accomplishments and honors

Awards
- The Sporting News' National Assistant Coach of the Year (1997)

Mike DeBord (February 7, 1956 – April 15, 2025) was an American college football coach who was a longtime assistant for the Michigan Wolverines and a head coach for the Central Michigan Chippewas. He was the offensive coordinator for the Wolverines for five seasons (1997–1999, 2006–2007) including Michigan's 1997 campaign, in which the team won part of a national championship. He was the head football coach at Central Michigan University from 2000 to 2003, compiling a record of 12–34.

DeBord worked as an assistant coach at the University of Michigan for a total of 11 seasons, from 1993 to 1999 and again from 2004 to 2007. He coached professionally as an assistant coach in the National Football League (NFL), with the Seattle Seahawks (2008–2009) and the Chicago Bears (2010–2012). He was also the offensive coordinator of the San Diego Fleet of the Alliance of American Football (AAF), and was the associate head coach and offensive coordinator at Indiana University prior to joining the AAF.

== Playing career ==
DeBord graduated from Wes-Del High School in Delaware County, Indiana. He started for four years on the offensive line at Manchester College, receiving all-conference, all-district and honorable mention NAIA All-America honors during the 1977 season when he was captain. DeBord later earned a master's degree from Ball State in 1981 while serving as a graduate assistant.

== Coaching career ==
=== Early years ===
Debord's coaching career began in 1978 at South Decatur HS. In 1982, DeBord embarked on a college coaching journey that included stops at Franklin College, Fort Hays State University, Eastern Illinois University, Ball State University, Colorado State University and Northwestern University before joining the Michigan staff under head coach Gary Moeller.

==== First stint at Michigan ====
At Michigan, he served as offensive line coach from 1992 to 1996. In 1997, he was promoted to offensive coordinator. During DeBord's first year as offensive coordinator in 1997, Michigan won their first national championship since 1948.

=== Central Michigan ===
DeBord was hired as the head football coach at Central Michigan by athletic director Herb Deromedi in 2000. He would go on to post a 12–34 record, resigning after the 2003 season. DeBord never won more than four games in a season in his time at Central Michigan.

=== Assistant coach ===
==== Return to Michigan ====
DeBord rejoined the Wolverines in 2004 as special teams and recruiting coordinator for head coach Lloyd Carr, taking over the role filled by the retiring Bobby Morrison. DeBord served in that capacity for two seasons before succeeding Terry Malone as offensive coordinator and tight ends coach in 2006. Malone had previously replaced DeBord when DeBord took the head coaching job at Central Michigan in 2000.

DeBord was a candidate for the head coaching position at Michigan following the retirement of Lloyd Carr in 2007. The job ultimately went to Rich Rodriguez, who fired all Michigan assistant coaches except running backs coach Fred Jackson. As the offensive coordinator at Michigan, DeBord posted a 52–11 regular season record and a post season record of 4–1.

==== NFL ====
On March 5, 2008, the Seattle Seahawks announced that DeBord had been hired as the assistant offensive line coach. DeBord was promoted to tight end coach for the 2009 season.

On February 2, 2010, the Chicago Bears announced DeBord as their new tight ends coach, after coming to terms for the 2010 season. DeBord was dismissed by new head coach Marc Trestman on January 17, 2013.

==== Tennessee ====
On February 5, 2015, DeBord was hired by Tennessee head coach Butch Jones as offensive coordinator, replacing Mike Bajakian, who left to become quarterbacks coach for the Tampa Bay Buccaneers. Jones had previously worked under DeBord as an assistant coach at Central Michigan. On January 3, 2017, it was announced that DeBord would be leaving Tennessee to become the offensive coordinator for Indiana.

==== Indiana ====
On January 4, 2017, Indiana head coach Tom Allen hired DeBord as offensive coordinator, replacing Kevin Johns, who departed the position for offensive coordinator and quarterbacks coach with the Western Michigan Broncos. On December 30, 2018, DeBord announced his retirement from football.

==== San Diego Fleet (AAF) ====
In January 2019, San Diego Fleet offensive coordinator Jon Kitna departed the team to become quarterbacks coach of the Dallas Cowboys. To take his place, the Fleet hired DeBord, reuniting him with Fleet head coach and former Bears colleague Mike Martz.

==== Third stint at Michigan ====
DeBord rejoined the Michigan football team on March 4, 2020, as an offensive analyst under head coach Jim Harbaugh.

==== Kansas ====
DeBord was hired as the offensive coordinator for Kansas on February 2, 2021. He was not retained when Les Miles was fired in March 2021 following reports of misconduct when he was coaching LSU and replaced by Buffalo head coach Lance Leipold with Leipold hiring Andy Kotelnicki as his offensive coordinator.

== Sports administration ==
On February 1, 2013, DeBord was hired by Michigan athletic director Dave Brandon to be the sports administrator for the school's Olympic sports teams. In this role he worked with the field hockey, men's and women's cross country, men's and women's gymnastics, men's and women's track and field, and men's and women's tennis programs.

== Personal life and death ==
Debord suffered a major stroke in September 2021. He died of complications from that stroke on April 15, 2025, at the age of 69.

He was inducted into the Indiana Football Hall of Fame in 2005.

== Head coaching record ==
Year	Team	Overall	Conference	Standing	Bowl/playoffs
Central Michigan Chippewas (Mid-American Conference) (2000–2003)
2000	Central Michigan	2–9	2–6	6th (West)	
2001	Central Michigan	3–8	2–6	5th (West)	
2002	Central Michigan	4–8	2–6	5th (West)	
2003	Central Michigan	3–9	1–7	7th (West)	
Central Michigan:		12–34	7–25		
Total:		12–34			
