= 2003 Buffalo Bulls football team =

American college football season

2003 Buffalo Bulls football
- Conference: Mid-American Conference
- East Division
- Record: 1–11 (1–7 MAC)
- Head coach: Jim Hofher (3rd season)
- Captains: Mark Graham; Jeff Mills; Lamar Wilcher
- Home stadium: University at Buffalo Stadium

2003 Mid-American Conference football standings
	Conf.			Overall
Team	W		L	W		L
East Division
No. 10 Miami (OH) x$	8	–	0	13	–	1
Marshall	6	–	2	8	–	4
Akron	5	–	3	7	–	5
Kent State	4	–	4	5	–	7
UCF	2	–	6	3	–	9
Ohio	1	–	7	2	–	10
Buffalo	1	–	7	1	–	11
West Division
No. 23 Bowling Green x	7	–	1	11	–	3
Northern Illinois	6	–	2	10	–	2
Toledo	6	–	2	8	–	4
Western Michigan	4	–	4	5	–	7
Ball State	3	–	5	4	–	8
Eastern Michigan	2	–	6	3	–	9
Central Michigan	1	–	7	3	–	9
Championship: Miami 49, Bowling Green 27
$ – Conference champion; x – Division champion/co-champions; Rankings from AP Poll

The 2003 Buffalo Bulls football team represented the University at Buffalo as a member of the Mid-American Conference (MAC) during the 2003 NCAA Division I-A football season. Led by third-year head coach Jim Hofher, the Bulls compiled an overall record of 1–11 with a mark of 1–7 in conference play, tying for sixth place at the bottom of the standings in the MAC's East Division. The team played home games at the University at Buffalo Stadium in Amherst, New York.

== Schedule ==
Date	Time	Opponent	Site	TV	Result	Attendance	Source
August 30	7:00 pm	at Rutgers*	Rutgers Stadium; Piscataway, NJ		L 10–24	25,011	
September 6	12:00 pm	at No. 23 Iowa*	Kinnick Stadium; Iowa City, IA	ESPN Plus	L 7–56	54,471	
September 13	6:00 pm	Colgate*	University at Buffalo Stadium; Amherst, NY		L 15–38	20,324	
September 20	6:00 pm	Connecticut*	University at Buffalo Stadium; Amherst, NY		L 7–38	10,107	
September 27	6:00 pm	Akron	University at Buffalo Stadium; Amherst, NY		L 21–38	6,385	
October 4	6:00 pm	at UCF	Florida Citrus Bowl; Orlando, FL		L 10–19	22,540	
October 11	2:00 pm	at Miami (OH)	Yager Stadium; Oxford, OH		L 3–59	23,683	
October 18	1:00 pm	Marshall^{†}	University at Buffalo Stadium; Amherst, NY	ESPN+	L 16–26	10,118	
October 25	1:00 pm	Ohio	University at Buffalo Stadium; Amherst, NY		W 26–17	4,423	
November 1	7:00 pm	at Toledo	Glass Bowl; Toledo, OH		L 29–56	18,001	
November 8	1:00 pm	No. 23 Northern Illinois	University at Buffalo Stadium; Amherst, NY		L 9–40	5,127	
November 22	4:00 pm	at Kent State	Dix Stadium; Kent, OH		L 24–34	7,196	
*Non-conference game; ^{†}Homecoming; Rankings from Coaches' Poll released prior to the game; All times are in Eastern time

== Roster ==
2003 Buffalo Bulls football team roster
Players
Coaches
Offense

Pos.	#	Name	Class
QB	7	Randall Secky	Jr
WR	85	Matt Knueven	Jr

Defense

Pos.	#	Name	Class
DB	2	Mark Graham	Sr

Special teams

Pos.	#	Name	Class

Head coach

- Jim Hofher

Coordinators/assistant coaches

Legend

- (C) Team captain
- (S) Suspended
- (I) Ineligible
- Injured
- Redshirt

Roster
Last update: 2003-12-04
