= 2003 Eastern Michigan Eagles football team =

American college football season

2003 Eastern Michigan Eagles football
- Conference: Mid-American Conference
- West Division
- Record: 3–9 (2–6 MAC)
- Head coach: Jeff Woodruff (4th season; first 9 games); Al Lavan (interim, final 3 games)
- Offensive coordinator: Tim Salem (1st season)
- Defensive coordinator: Tim Rose (1st season)
- Home stadium: Rynearson Stadium

2003 Mid-American Conference football standings
| | Conf. | | | Overall |
| Team | W | | L | W | | L |
|---|---|---|---|---|---|---|
East Division
| No. 10 Miami (OH) x$ | 8 | – | 0 | 13 | – | 1 |
| Marshall | 6 | – | 2 | 8 | – | 4 |
| Akron | 5 | – | 3 | 7 | – | 5 |
| Kent State | 4 | – | 4 | 5 | – | 7 |
| UCF | 2 | – | 6 | 3 | – | 9 |
| Ohio | 1 | – | 7 | 2 | – | 10 |
| Buffalo | 1 | – | 7 | 1 | – | 11 |
West Division
| No. 23 Bowling Green x | 7 | – | 1 | 11 | – | 3 |
| Northern Illinois | 6 | – | 2 | 10 | – | 2 |
| Toledo | 6 | – | 2 | 8 | – | 4 |
| Western Michigan | 4 | – | 4 | 5 | – | 7 |
| Ball State | 3 | – | 5 | 4 | – | 8 |
| Eastern Michigan | 2 | – | 6 | 3 | – | 9 |
| Central Michigan | 1 | – | 7 | 3 | – | 9 |
Championship: Miami 49, Bowling Green 27
$ – Conference champion; x – Division champion/co-champions; Rankings from AP Poll

The 2003 Eastern Michigan Eagles football team represented Eastern Michigan University in the 2003 NCAA Division I-A football season. Eastern Michigan competed as a member of the Mid-American Conference (MAC) West Division. The team was coached by Jeff Woodruff in his final season at EMU. Following the 38–10 loss to Central Michigan, Woodruff, who had compiled a 9–34 record in 3 3/4 seasons, was fired on November 3. Running backs coach Al Lavan was named the interim coach while the school conducted a national search for the new permanent coach, and under his leadership the team won two of their final three games. After the end of the season, Northwestern running backs coach Jeff Genyk was hired as the new EMU head coach.

== Schedule ==
| Date | Time | Opponent | Site | Result | Attendance | Source |
|---|---|---|---|---|---|---|
| August 28 | 7:00 pm | East Tennessee State* | Rynearson Stadium; Ypsilanti, MI | W 28–21 | 11,725 | |
| September 4 | 7:00 pm | Western Illinois* | Rynearson Stadium; Ypsilanti, MI | L 12–34 | 11,123 | |
| September 13 | 6:00 pm | at Akron | Rubber Bowl; Akron, OH | L 17–24 | 10,262 | |
| September 20 | 1:30 pm | at Navy* | Navy–Marine Corps Memorial Stadium; Annapolis, MD | L 7–39 | 27,627 | |
| September 27 | 6:00 pm | Maryland* | Rynearson Stadium; Ypsilanti, MI | L 13–37 | 19,628 | |
| October 4 | 2:00 pm | Western Michigan | Rynearson Stadium; Ypsilanti, MI | L 3–31 | 19,963 | |
| October 11 | 7:00 pm | at Toledo | Glass Bowl; Toledo, OH | L 14–49 | 22,807 | |
| October 18 | 6:00 pm | Bowling Green | Rynearson Stadium; Ypsilanti, MI | L 20–33 | 6,154 | |
| November 1 | 1:00 pm | at Central Michigan | Kelly/Shorts Stadium; Mount Pleasant, MI (rivalry) | L 10–38 | 8,391 | |
| November 8 | 12:00 pm | UCF | Rynearson Stadium; Ypsilanti, MI | W 19–13 | 5,150 | |
| November 15 | 1:00 pm | Ball State | Rynearson Stadium; Ypsilanti, MI | W 38–14 | 5,075 | |
| November 22 | 2:05 pm | at Northern Illinois | Huskie Stadium; DeKalb, IL | L 24–38 | 16,589 | |
*Non-conference game; All times are in Eastern time

EMU was briefly scheduled to host the South Florida Bulls in 2003. The Rynearson Stadium game had originally been scheduled for 2002, but the Bulls paid EMU a $50,000 postponement fee to delay the game to 2003, allowing USF a 2002 game at Arkansas. However, EMU dropped USF from the 2003 schedule with no advance notice.

== Game summaries ==
=== East Tennessee State ===
| | 1 | 2 | 3 | 4 | Total |
|---|---|---|---|---|---|
| Buccaneers | 0 | 14 | 7 | 0 | 21 |
| Eagles | 7 | 7 | 7 | 7 | 28 |

EMU opened the season with the East Tennessee State Buccaneers, a Division I-AA team in the Southern Conference. East Tennessee State had a 4–8 record in 2002, and 2003 would be the final year for their football program, which had been losing nearly $1 million per year from 1999 through 2003.

Scoring summary

1st Quarter

- 1:16 EMU – Anthony Sherrell 68 yard pass from Chinedu Okoro (Andrew Wellock kick) 7–0 EMU

2nd Quarter

- 10:26 EMU – Anthony Sherrell 38 yard run (Andrew Wellock kick) 14–0 EMU
- 8:56 East Tennessee State – Scott Brumett 70 yard interception return (Jonathan Godfrey kick) 14–7 EMU
- 0:57 East Tennessee State – Brian Matthews 34 yard pass from Carl Meadows (Jonathan Godfrey kick) 14–14

3rd Quarter

- 7:12 East Tennessee State – Gavin Varner 1 yard run (Jonathan Godfrey kick) 14–21 East Tennessee State
- 4:02 EMU – Chinedu Okoro 1 yard run (Andrew Wellock kick) 21–21

4th Quarter

- 7:49 EMU – Eric Deslauriers 44 yard pass from Chinedu Okoro (Andrew Wellock kick) 28–21 EMU

=== Western Illinois ===
| | 1 | 2 | 3 | 4 | Total |
|---|---|---|---|---|---|
| Leathernecks | 7 | 7 | 6 | 14 | 34 |
| Eagles | 3 | 3 | 3 | 3 | 12 |

Following the Leathernecks' win over EMU, Western Illinois received its first-ever #1 ranking in the national Division I-AA polls, though they lost the ranking the following week with a 35–7 loss to the eventual I-A national champions, the LSU Tigers.

Scoring summary

1st Quarter

- 11:02 Western Illinois – Travis Glasford 2 yard run (Justin Langan kick) 0–7 Western Illinois
- 4:14 EMU – Andrew Wellock 38 yard field goal 3–7 Western Illinois

2nd Quarter

- 13:01 EMU – Andrew Wellock 33 yard field goal 6–7 Western Illinois
- 2:01 Western Illinois – James Norris 95 yard punt return (Justin Langan kick) 6–14 Western Illinois

3rd Quarter

- 13:27 EMU – Andrew Wellock 35 yard field goal 9–14 Western Illinois
- 8:41 Western Illinois – Travis Glasford 1 yard run (Justin Langan missed kick) 9–20 Western Illinois

4th Quarter

- 13:18 EMU – Andrew Wellock 25 yard field goal 12–20 Western Illinois
- 7:22 Western Illinois – Russ Michna 15 yard run (Justin Langan kick) 12–27 Western Illinois
- 3:56 Western Illinois – Travis Glasford 11 yard run (Justin Langan kick) 12–34 Western Illinois

=== Akron ===
| | 1 | 2 | 3 | 4 | Total |
|---|---|---|---|---|---|
| Eagles | 0 | 10 | 7 | 0 | 17 |
| Zips | 7 | 14 | 0 | 3 | 24 |

Scoring summary

1st Quarter

- 3:42 Akron – Matt Cherry 58 yard punt return (Jason Swiger kick) 0–7 Akron

2nd Quarter

- 14:17 Akron – Miquel Irvin 16 yard pass from Charlie Frye (Jason Swiger kick) 0–14 Akron
- 11:06 EMU – Anthony Sherrell 13 yard run (Andrew Wellock kick) 7–14 Akron
- 4:15 Akron – Charlie Frye 2 yard run (Jason Swiger kick) 7–21 Akron
- 1:20 EMU – Andrew Wellock 43 yard field goal 10–21 Akron

3rd Quarter

- 3:49 EMU – Chinedu Okoro 1 yard run (Andrew Wellock kick) 17–21 Akron

4th Quarter

- 5:14 Akron – Jason Swiger 23 yard field goal 17–24 Akron

=== Navy ===
| | 1 | 2 | 3 | 4 | Total |
|---|---|---|---|---|---|
| Eagles | 0 | 0 | 0 | 7 | 7 |
| Midshipmen | 8 | 3 | 14 | 14 | 39 |

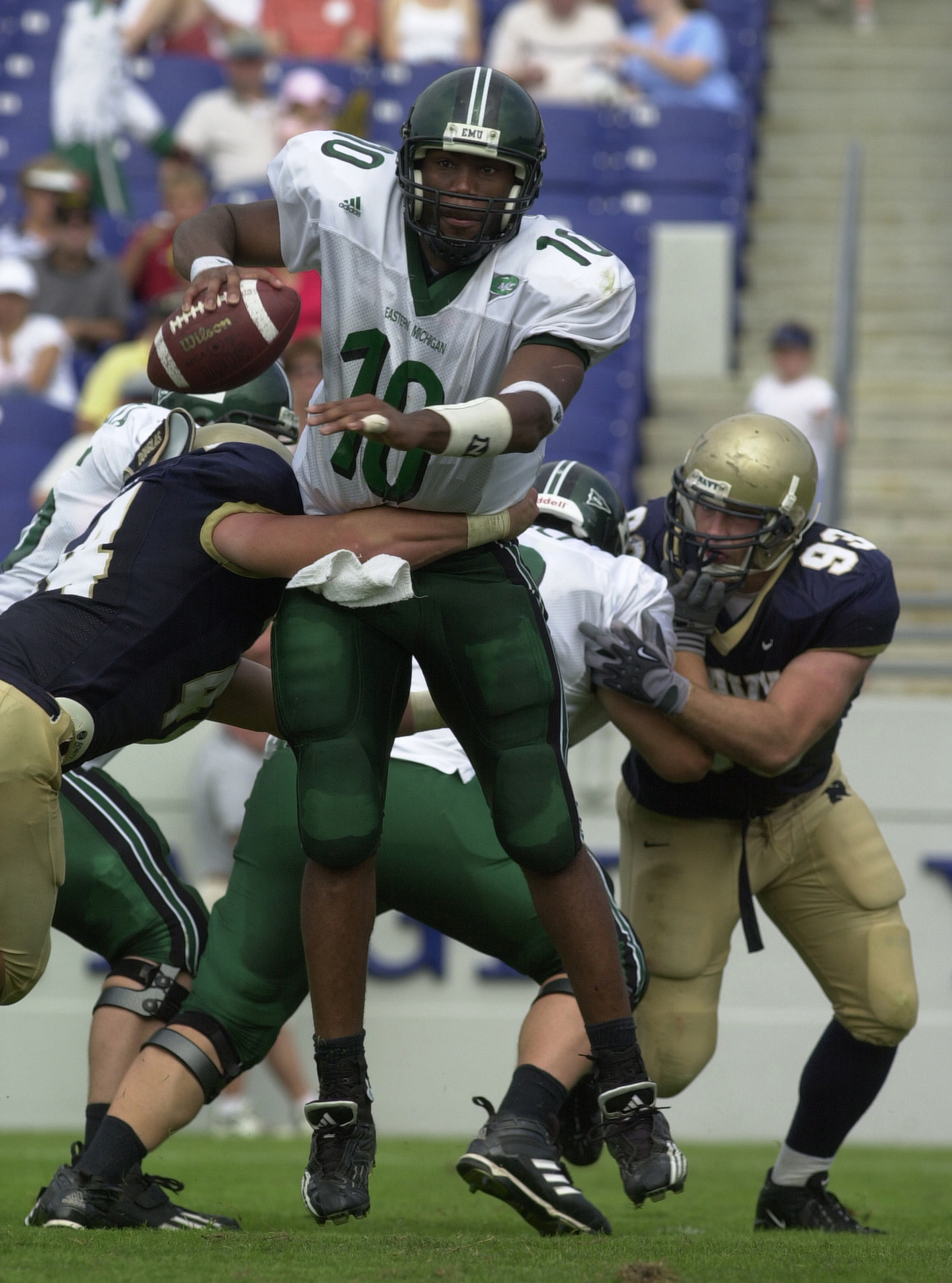
EMU junior quarterback Chinedu Okoro being tackled by Navy junior linebacker Lane Jackson.

With their win over EMU, the Midshipmen won consecutive home games for the first time since 1997. EMU's offense committed six turnovers, including four interceptions thrown by Chinedu Okoro, about which head coach Jeff Woodruff commented, "You can’t beat a high school team giving up five turnovers...Mathematically, you are out of the game with that. That was frustrating because the defense was playing well."

Scoring summary

1st Quarter

- 1:12 Navy – Eric Roberts 15 yard pass from Craig Candeto (Amir Jenkins pass from Craig Candeto) 0–8 Navy

2nd Quarter

- 7:57 Navy – Geoff Blumenfeld 29 yard field goal 0–11 Navy

3rd Quarter

- 12:23 Navy – Tony Lane 32 yard run (Geoff Blumenfeld kick) 0–18 Navy
- 8:17 Navy – Trey Hines 17 yard run (Geoff Blumenfeld kick) 0–25 Navy

4th Quarter

- 13:50 Navy – Craig Candeto 3 yard run (Geoff Blumenfeld kick) 0–32 Navy
- 12:28 Navy – Bronston Carroll 2 yard run (Geoff Blumenfeld kick) 0–39 Navy
- 7:13 EMU – Chris R. Roberson 13 yard pass from Chinedu Okoro (Andrew Wellock kick) 7–39 Navy

=== Maryland ===
| | 1 | 2 | 3 | 4 | Total |
|---|---|---|---|---|---|
| Terrapins | 6 | 10 | 7 | 14 | 37 |
| Eagles | 3 | 7 | 3 | 0 | 13 |

This game was the first — and so far, the only — occasion on which a team from an AQ conference played at Rynearson Stadium.

Scoring summary

1st Quarter

- 12:07 Maryland – Domonique Foxworth 44 yard interception return (Nick Novak kick failed) 0–6 Maryland
- 2:09 EMU – Andrew Wellock 42 yard field goal 3–6 Maryland

2nd Quarter

- 4:56 Maryland – Josh Allen 1 yard run (Nick Novak kick) 3–13 Maryland
- 0:23 EMU – Kevin Zureki 8 yard pass from Chinedu Okoro (Andrew Wellock kick) 10–13 Maryland
- 0:02 Maryland – Nick Novak 27 yard field goal 10–16 Maryland

3rd Quarter

- 10:54 EMU – Andrew Wellock 25 yard field goal 13–16 Maryland
- 5:42 Maryland – Josh Allen 8 yard run (Nick Novak kick) 13–23 Maryland

4th Quarter

- 14:54 Maryland – Scott McBrien 9 yard run (Nick Novak kick) 13–30 Maryland
- 9:16 Maryland – Dan Melendez 14 yard pass from Scott McBrien (Nick Novak kick) 13–37 Maryland

=== Western Michigan ===
| | 1 | 2 | 3 | 4 | Total |
|---|---|---|---|---|---|
| Broncos | 0 | 0 | 14 | 17 | 31 |
| Eagles | 0 | 3 | 0 | 0 | 3 |

Scoring summary

1st Quarter

2nd Quarter

- 13:34 EMU – Andrew Wellock 32 yard field goal 3–0 EMU

3rd Quarter

- 11:30 Western Michigan – Greg Jennings 34 yard pass from Chad Munson (Robert Menchinger kick) 3–7 Western Michigan
- 5:42 Western Michigan – Philip Reed 9 yard run (Robert Menchinger kick) 3–14 Western Michigan

4th Quarter

- 10:23 Western Michigan – Greg Jennings 22 yard pass from Chad Munson (Robert Menchinger kick) 3–21 Western Michigan
- 8:46 Western Michigan – Robert Menchinger 22 yard field goal 3–24 Western Michigan
- 2:49 Western Michigan – Tyson Devree 16 yard pass from Chad Munson (Robert Menchinger kick) 3–31 Western Michigan

=== Toledo ===
| | 1 | 2 | 3 | 4 | Total |
|---|---|---|---|---|---|
| Eagles | 7 | 0 | 7 | 0 | 14 |
| Rockets | 14 | 28 | 7 | 0 | 49 |

Scoring summary

1st Quarter

- 12:57 Toledo – Trinity Dawson 5 yard run (Jason Robbins kick) 0–7 Toledo
- 7:17 EMU – Chris R. Roberson 4 yard pass from Chinedu Okoro (Andrew Wellock kick) 7–7
- 0:04 Toledo – Trinity Dawson 1 yard run (Jason Robbins kick) 7–14 Toledo

2nd Quarter

- 11:35 Toledo – Astin Martin 1 yard run (Jason Robbins kick) 7–21 Toledo
- 6:42 Toledo – Trinity Dawson 8 yard pass from Bruce Gradkowski (Jason Robbins kick) 7–28 Toledo
- 4:13 Toledo – Steve Odom 12 yard pass from Bruce Gradkowski (Jason Robbins kick) 7–35 Toledo
- 0:31 Toledo – Terrance Hudson 19 yard pas from Bruce Gradkowski (Jason Robbins kick) 7–42 Toledo

3rd Quarter

- 3:29 EMU – Anthony Sherrell 3 yard run (Andrew Wellock kick) 14–42 Toledo
- 0:00 Toledo – Steve Odom 80 yard punt return (Jason Robbins kick) 14–49 Toledo

4th Quarter

=== Bowling Green ===
| | 1 | 2 | 3 | 4 | Total |
|---|---|---|---|---|---|
| Falcons | 14 | 12 | 0 | 7 | 33 |
| Eagles | 7 | 7 | 3 | 3 | 20 |

Scoring summary

1st Quarter

- 13:19 Bowling Green – P.J. Pope 1 yard run (Shaun Suisham kick) 0–7 Bowling Green
- 10:38 EMU – Kevin Zureki 40 yard pass from Chinedu Okoro (Andrew Wellock kick) 7–7
- 3:45 Bowling Green – Josh Harris 20 yard run (Shaun Suisham kick) 7–14 Bowling Green

2nd Quarter

- 14:12 Bowling Green – Shaun Suisham 24 yard field goal 7–17 Bowling Green
- 10:56 EMU – Anthony Sherrell 3 yard run (Andrew Wellock kick) 14–17 Bowling Green
- 6:59 Bowling Green – Josh Harris 4 yard run (Shaun Suisham missed kick) 14–23 Bowling Green
- 0:22 Bowling Green – Shaun Suisham 23 yard field goal 14–26 Bowling Green

3rd Quarter

- 2:15 EMU – Andrew Wellock 40 yard field goal 17–26 Bowling Green

4th Quarter

- 12:59 Bowling Green – Josh Harris 5 yard run (Shaun Suisham kick) 17–33 Bowling Green
- 8:08 EMU – Andrew Wellock 29 yard field goal 20–33 Bowling Green

=== Central Michigan ===
Following the 38–10 loss to Central Michigan, EMU's eight consecutive loss, Jeff Woodruff, who had compiled a 9–34 record in 3 3/4 seasons, was fired on November 3. Running backs coach Al Lavan was named the interim coach while the school conducted a national search for the new permanent coach.

| | 1 | 2 | 3 | 4 | Total |
|---|---|---|---|---|---|
| Eagles | 7 | 3 | 0 | 0 | 10 |
| Chippewas | 0 | 10 | 14 | 14 | 38 |

Scoring summary

1st Quarter

- 10:33 EMU – Anthony Sherrell 1 yard run (Andrew Wellock kick) 7–0 EMU

2nd Quarter

- 14:57 EMU – Andrew Wellock 21 yard field goal 10–0 EMU
- 8:52 Central Michigan – Joseph Staley 29 yard pass from Derrick Vickers (Mike Gruzwalski kick) 10–7 EMU
- 2:26 Central Michigan – Mike Gruzwalski 33 yard field goal 10–10

3rd Quarter

- 11:03 Central Michigan – Jerry Seymour 14 yard run (Mike Gruzwalski kick) 10–17 Central Michigan
- 0:23 Central Michigan – Troy Peyerk 12 yard pass from Derrick Vickers (Mike Gruzwalski kick) 10–24 Central Michigan

4th Quarter

- 9:42 Central Michigan – Jerry Seymour 16 yard run (Mike Gruzwalski kick) 10–31 Central Michigan
- 4:41 Central Michigan – Jerry Seymour 15 yard run (Mike Gruzwalski kick) 10–38 Central Michigan

=== Central Florida ===
| | 1 | 2 | 3 | 4 | Total |
|---|---|---|---|---|---|
| Knights | 0 | 13 | 0 | 0 | 13 |
| Eagles | 10 | 7 | 0 | 2 | 19 |

In Al Lavan's first game as interim head coach, the Eagles snapped an eight-game losing streak with a 19–13 win over Central Florida. After the two offenses combined for 20 second-quarter points, neither offense scored in the second half of the game.

Scoring summary

1st Quarter

- 12:50 EMU – Alonzo Harris 15 yard pass from Ken Bohnet (Andrew Wellock kick) 7–0 EMU
- 4:13 EMU – Andrew Wellock 39 yard field goal 10–0 EMU

2nd Quarter

- 13:50 Central Florida – Dontavius Wilcox 8 yard run (Matt Prater kick) 10–7 Central Michigan
- 9:31 Central Florida – Matt Prater 40 yard field goal 10–10
- 4:25 EMU – Anthony Sherrell 16 yard run (Andrew Wellock kick) 17–10 EMU
- 0:50 Central Florida – Matt Prater 46 yard field goal 17–13 EMU

3rd Quarter

4th Quarter

- 3:42 EMU – Matt Kudu safety 19–13 EMU

=== Ball State ===
| | 1 | 2 | 3 | 4 | Total |
|---|---|---|---|---|---|
| Cardinals | 0 | 0 | 7 | 7 | 14 |
| Eagles | 0 | 14 | 17 | 7 | 38 |

With a win over Ball State, the Eagles achieved back-to-back wins over Division I-A opponents for the first time in more than three years; they had last done this in November 2000, in Jeff Woodruff's first season as head coach.

Scoring summary

1st Quarter

2nd Quarter

- 14:58 EMU – Ken Bohnet 1 yard run (Andrew Wellock kick) 7–0 EMU
- 5:29 EMU – Anthony Sherrell 1 yard run (Andrew Wellock kick) 14–0 EMU

3rd Quarter

- 9:37 EMU – Andrew Wellock 32 yard field goal 17–0 EMU
- 7:44 EMU – Anthony Sherrell 1 yard run (Andrew Wellock kick) 24–0 EMU
- 4:00 EMU – Anthony Sherrell 1 yard run (Andrew Wellock kick) 31–0 EMU
- 1:31 Ball State – Dante Ridgeway 1 yard pass from Andy Roesch (Brian Jackson kick) 31–7 EMU

4th Quarter

- 11:18 EMU – Anthony Sherrell 9 yard run (Andrew Wellock kick) 38–7 EMU
- 3:47 Ball State – Ryan Hahaj 20 yard pass from Andy Roesch (Brian Jackson kick) 38–14 EMU

=== Northern Illinois ===
| | 1 | 2 | 3 | 4 | Total |
|---|---|---|---|---|---|
| Eagles | 14 | 3 | 0 | 7 | 24 |
| Huskies | 7 | 10 | 13 | 8 | 38 |

Scoring summary

1st Quarter

- Northern Illinois – Shatone Powers 8 yard pass from Josh Haldi (Steve Azar kick) 0–7 Northern Illinois
- EMU – Anthony Sherrell 2 yard run (Andrew Wellock kick) 7–7
- EMU – Anthony Sherrell 15 yard run (Andrew Wellock kick) 14–7 EMU

2nd Quarter

- Northern Illinois – Steve Azar 28 yard field goal 14–10 EMU
- Northern Illinois – Michael Turner 59 yard run (Steve Azar kick) 14–17 Northern Illinois
- EMU – Andrew Wellock 36 yard field goal 17–17

3rd Quarter

- Northern Illinois – Steve Azar 23 yard field goal 17–20 Northern Illinois
- Northern Illinois – Michael Turner 31 yard run (Steve Azar kick) 17–27 Northern Illinois
- Northern Illinois – Steve Azar 44 yard field goal 17–30 Northern Illinois

4th Quarter

- EMU – Kevin Zureki 20 yard pass from A. J. Bennett (Andrew Wellock kick) 24–30 Northern Illinois
- Northern Illinois – Michael Turner 3 yard run (Josh Haldi run for two-point conversion) 24–38 Northern Illinois

== Roster ==
2003 Eastern Michigan Eagles football team roster
Players
Coaches
Offense

| Pos. | # | Name | Class |
|---|---|---|---|
| WR | 5 | Chris Talley | Jr |
| WR | 6 | Chris Roberson | Jr |
| WR | 7 | LaGarian Houston | Fr |
| QB | 8 | Jeff Crooks | Sr |
| TE | 82 | Kevin Zureki | Sr |

Defense

| Pos. | # | Name | Class |
|---|---|---|---|
| DB | 2 | Yves Dieudonne | So |
| DB | 14 | Jereme Perry | Jr |
| LB | 37 | Mike Salvatori | Sr |

Special teams

| Pos. | # | Name | Class |

Head coach

- Jeff Woodruff

Coordinators/assistant coaches

- Tim Salem
  (Offensive coordinator & quarterbacks)

Legend

- (C) Team captain
- (S) Suspended
- (I) Ineligible
- Injured
- Redshirt

Roster
