= Ellicott High School =

Location
- 375 South Ellicott Highway; Ellicott, Colorado 80808; United States
- Coordinates: 38°49′36″N 104°23′10″W

Information
- Type: Public high school
- School district: Ellicott School District 22
- NCES School ID: 080375000485
- Principal: Jeffrey Zick
- Teaching staff: 18.65 (on an FTE basis)
- Grades: 9–12
- Enrollment: 252 (2023-2024)
- Student to teacher ratio: 13.51
- Colors: Purple, Gold, White
- Athletics conference: CHSAA
- Nickname: Thunderhawks
- Website: www.ellicottschools.org/domain/30

Ellicott High School is a public high school in Ellicott, Colorado, United States. It is part of the Ellicott School District 22.

== Athletics ==
=== Teams ===
Ellicott's athletic teams are nicknamed the Thunderhawks and the school's colors are purple, gold, and white. Ellicott teams compete in the following sports:

- Baseball
- Basketball
- Boys' soccer
- Cross Country
- Football
- Volleyball
- Track
- Wrestling
- Girls' soccer

=== State championships ===
- Girls' basketball
  - 1994 Colorado AA State Champions
  - 1995 Colorado AA State Champions
