= 2003 Western Michigan Broncos football team =

Football team

2003 Western Michigan Broncos football
- Conference: Mid-American Conference
- West Division
- Record: 5–7 (4–4 MAC)
- Head coach: Gary Darnell (7th season)
- Offensive coordinator: Brian Rock (4th season)
- MVP: Jason Feldpausch
- Home stadium: Waldo Stadium

2003 Mid-American Conference football standings
	Conf.			Overall
Team	W		L	W		L
East Division
No. 10 Miami (OH) x$	8	–	0	13	–	1
Marshall	6	–	2	8	–	4
Akron	5	–	3	7	–	5
Kent State	4	–	4	5	–	7
UCF	2	–	6	3	–	9
Ohio	1	–	7	2	–	10
Buffalo	1	–	7	1	–	11
West Division
No. 23 Bowling Green x	7	–	1	11	–	3
Northern Illinois	6	–	2	10	–	2
Toledo	6	–	2	8	–	4
Western Michigan	4	–	4	5	–	7
Ball State	3	–	5	4	–	8
Eastern Michigan	2	–	6	3	–	9
Central Michigan	1	–	7	3	–	9
Championship: Miami 49, Bowling Green 27
$ – Conference champion; x – Division champion/co-champions; Rankings from AP Poll

The 2003 Western Michigan Broncos football team represented Western Michigan University in the Mid-American Conference (MAC) during the 2003 NCAA Division I-A football season. In their seventh season under head coach Gary Darnell, the Broncos compiled a 7–5 record (5–3 against MAC opponents), finished in a tie for third place in the MAC's West Division, and were outscored by their opponents, 370 to 331. The team played its home games in Waldo Stadium in Kalamazoo, Michigan.

The team's statistical leaders included Chad Munson with 2,123 passing yards, Philip Reed with 744 rushing yards, and Greg Jennings with 1,050 receiving yards. Linebacker Jason Babin was selected by The Sporting News as a second-team All-American.

== Schedule ==
Date	Time	Opponent	Site	TV	Result	Attendance	Source
August 30	3:40 p.m.	at Michigan State*	Spartan Stadium; East Lansing, MI	ESPN Plus	L 21–26	72,923	
September 6	7:00 p.m.	William & Mary*	Waldo Stadium; Kalamazoo, MI		W 56–24	25,316	
September 13	2:00 p.m.	Virginia*	Waldo Stadium; Kalamazoo, MI		L 16–59	21,982	
September 27	4:00 p.m.	at Ohio	Peden Stadium; Athens, OH		W 39–32	14,281	
October 4	2:00 p.m.	at Eastern Michigan	Rynearson Stadium; Ypsilanti, MI		W 31–3	19,963	
October 11	2:00 p.m.	Bowling Green	Waldo Stadium; Kalamazoo, MI		L 21–32	23,843	
October 18	4:00 p.m.	at No. 18 Northern Illinois	Huskie Stadium; DeKalb, IL		L 10–37	28,221	
October 25	2:30 p.m.	Marshall	Waldo Stadium; Kalamazoo, MI	FSN	L 21–41	15,878	
November 1	12:00 p.m.	at Connecticut*	Rentschler Field; East Hartford, CT		L 27–41	32,851	
November 8		Ball State	Waldo Stadium; Kalamazoo, MI		W 28–20	8,662	
November 15		Central Michigan	Waldo Stadium; Kalamazoo, MI (rivalry)		W 44–21		
November 22	7:00 p.m.	at Toledo	Glass Bowl; Toledo, OH		L 17–34	15,191	
*Non-conference game; Rankings from AP Poll released prior to the game; All times are in Eastern time

== Roster ==
2003 Western Michigan Broncos football team roster
Players
Coaches
Offense

Pos.	#	Name	Class
WR	15	Greg Jennings	So
TE	85	Tony Scheffler	So

Defense

Pos.	#	Name	Class

Special teams

Pos.	#	Name	Class

Head coach

- Gary Darnell

Coordinators/assistant coaches

Legend

- (C) Team captain
- (S) Suspended
- (I) Ineligible
- Injured
- Redshirt
