= 2003 UCF Golden Knights football team =

American college football season

2003 UCF Golden Knights football
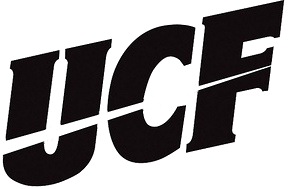
- Conference: Mid-American Conference
- East Division
- Record: 3–9 (2–6 MAC)
- Head coach: Mike Kruczek (6th season; first 10 games); Alan Gooch (interim, last 2 games)
- Offensive coordinator: Robert McFarland (3rd season)
- Defensive coordinator: Bill D'Ottavio (2nd season)
- Home stadium: Florida Citrus Bowl

2003 Mid-American Conference football standings
	Conf.			Overall
Team	W		L	W		L
East Division
No. 10 Miami (OH) x$	8	–	0	13	–	1
Marshall	6	–	2	8	–	4
Akron	5	–	3	7	–	5
Kent State	4	–	4	5	–	7
UCF	2	–	6	3	–	9
Ohio	1	–	7	2	–	10
Buffalo	1	–	7	1	–	11
West Division
No. 23 Bowling Green x	7	–	1	11	–	3
Northern Illinois	6	–	2	10	–	2
Toledo	6	–	2	8	–	4
Western Michigan	4	–	4	5	–	7
Ball State	3	–	5	4	–	8
Eastern Michigan	2	–	6	3	–	9
Central Michigan	1	–	7	3	–	9
Championship: Miami 49, Bowling Green 27
$ – Conference champion; x – Division champion/co-champions; Rankings from AP Poll

The 2003 UCF Golden Knights football team represented the University of Central Florida in the 2003 NCAA Division I-A football season. After signing a three-year contract extension to begin the season, head coach Mike Kruczek was fired following a 3–7 start. Kruczek was replaced on an interim basis by Assistant coach and former player Alan Gooch who finished out the dismal 3–9 season.

With three games remaining, senior starting quarterback Ryan Schnieder was suspended from the team, effectively ending his college career.

2003 marked the Golden Knights second season in the Mid-American Conference, in the East Division.

== Schedule ==
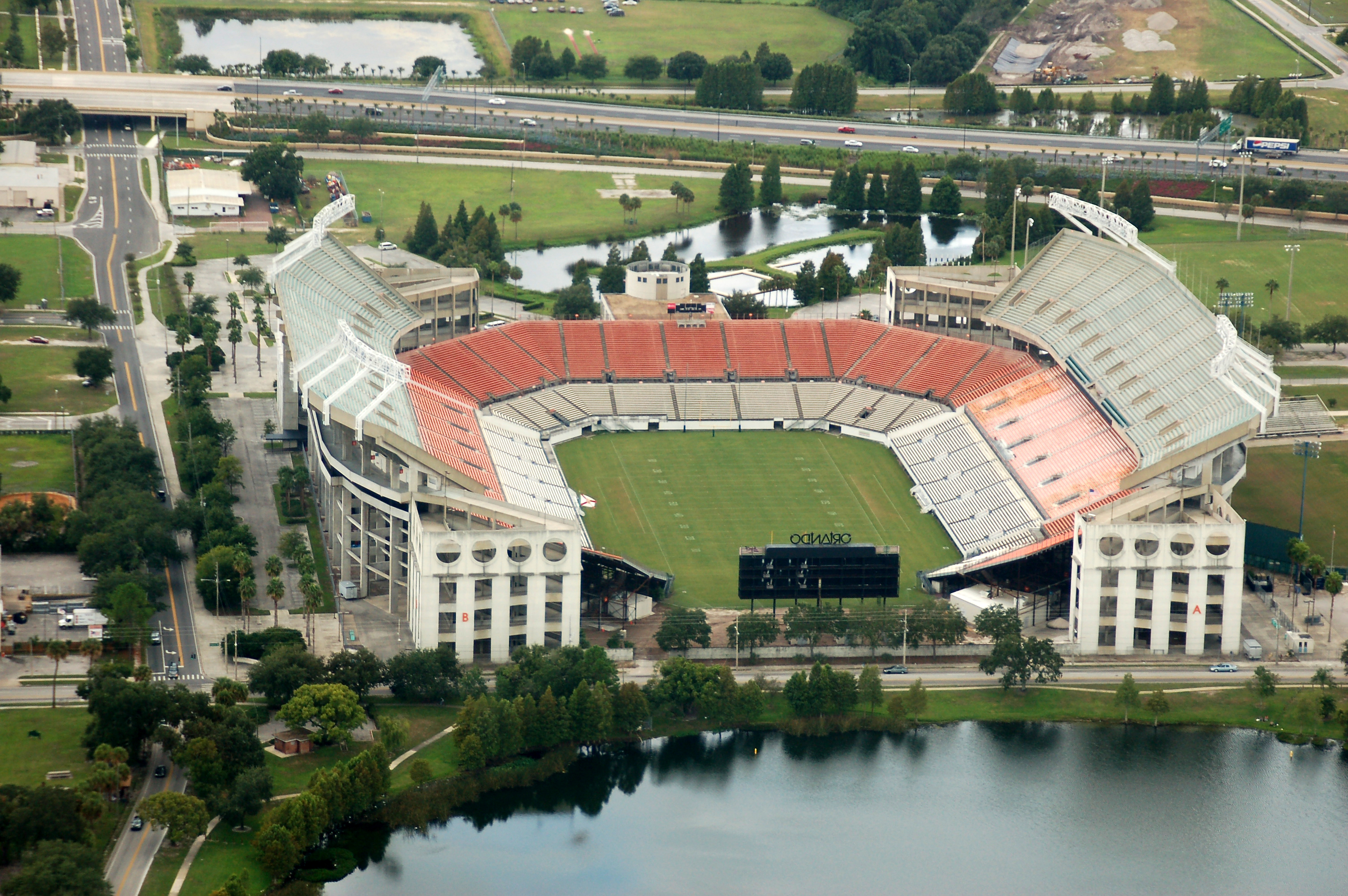
The Citrus Bowl, the Knights home field

Date	Time	Opponent	Site	TV	Result	Attendance
August 31	3:00pm	at No. 9 Virginia Tech*	Lane Stadium; Blacksburg, VA	ESPN	L 28–49	65,115
September 13	6:00pm	Florida Atlantic*	Florida Citrus Bowl; Orlando, FL		W 33–29	26,901
September 20	12:00pm	at Syracuse*	Carrier Dome; Syracuse, NY	ESPN	L 14–38	35,103
September 27	2:00pm	at Kent State	Dix Stadium; Kent, OH		L 16–36	6,728
October 4	6:00pm	Buffalo	Florida Citrus Bowl; Orlando, FL		W 19–10	22,540
October 11	2:00pm	at Ohio	Peden Stadium; Athens, OH		L 0–28	21,109
October 18	6:00pm	at Akron	Rubber Bowl; Akron, OH		L 24–38	8,113
October 25	4:00pm	Central Michigan^{†}	Florida Citrus Bowl; Orlando, FL		W 31–13	20,523
November 1	1:00pm	at West Virginia*	Mountaineer Field; Morgantown, WV		L 18–36	42,712
November 8	12:00pm	at Eastern Michigan	Rynearson Stadium; Ypsilanti, MI		L 13–29	5,150
November 19	7:30pm	Marshall	Florida Citrus Bowl; Orlando, FL	ESPN2	L 7–21	18,141
November 28	1:00pm	No. 15 Miami (OH)	Florida Citrus Bowl; Orlando, FL		L 21–56	12,902
*Non-conference game; ^{†}Homecoming; Rankings from AP Poll released prior to the game; All times are in Eastern time
