= 2003 Toledo Rockets football team =

American college football season

2003 Toledo Rockets football
- Conference: Mid-American Conference
- West Division
- Record: 8–4 (6–2 MAC)
- Head coach: Tom Amstutz (3rd season)
- Offensive coordinator: Rob Spence (3rd season)
- Offensive scheme: Spread
- Defensive coordinator: Lou West (3rd season)
- Base defense: 4–4
- Home stadium: Glass Bowl

2003 Mid-American Conference football standings
	Conf.			Overall
Team	W		L	W		L
East Division
No. 10 Miami (OH) x$	8	–	0	13	–	1
Marshall	6	–	2	8	–	4
Akron	5	–	3	7	–	5
Kent State	4	–	4	5	–	7
UCF	2	–	6	3	–	9
Ohio	1	–	7	2	–	10
Buffalo	1	–	7	1	–	11
West Division
No. 23 Bowling Green x	7	–	1	11	–	3
Northern Illinois	6	–	2	10	–	2
Toledo	6	–	2	8	–	4
Western Michigan	4	–	4	5	–	7
Ball State	3	–	5	4	–	8
Eastern Michigan	2	–	6	3	–	9
Central Michigan	1	–	7	3	–	9
Championship: Miami 49, Bowling Green 27
$ – Conference champion; x – Division champion/co-champions; Rankings from AP Poll

The 2003 Toledo Rockets football team represented the University of Toledo during the 2003 NCAA Division I-A football season. They competed as a member of the Mid-American Conference (MAC) in the West Division. The Rockets were led by head coach Tom Amstutz.

== Schedule ==
Date	Time	Opponent	Site	TV	Result	Attendance
August 29	9:00 pm	at UNLV*	Sam Boyd Stadium; Whitney, Nevada	ESPN	L 18–28	21,791
September 6	7:00 pm	Liberty*	Glass Bowl; Toledo, Ohio		W 49–3	22,878
September 12	7:00 pm	at Marshall	Marshall University Stadium; Huntington, West Virginia	ESPN	W 24–17	31,511
September 20	7:00 pm	No. 9 Pittsburgh*	Glass Bowl; Toledo, Ohio		W 35–31	31,711
September 27	6:30 pm	at Syracuse*	Carrier Dome; Syracuse, New York		L 7–34	36,083
October 11	7:00 pm	Eastern Michigan^{†}	Glass Bowl; Toledo, Ohio		W 49–14	22,807
October 18	1:00 pm	at Central Michigan	Kelly/Shorts Stadium; Mount Pleasant, Michigan	TV5	W 31–13	11,343
October 25	2:00 pm	at Ball State	Ball State Stadium; Muncie, Indiana	TV5	L 14–38	10,327
November 1	7:00 pm	Buffalo	Glass Bowl; Toledo, Ohio		W 56–29	18,001
November 15	3:00 pm	No. 21 Northern Illinois	Glass Bowl; Toledo, Ohio	FSN	W 49–30	20,929
November 22	7:00 pm	Western Michigan	Glass Bowl; Toledo, Ohio		W 34–17	15,191
November 29	12:00 pm	at No. 22 Bowling Green	Doyt Perry Stadium; Bowling Green, Ohio (Battle of I-75)	ESPN	L 23–31	29,724
*Non-conference game; ^{†}Homecoming; Rankings from AP Poll released prior to the game; All times are in Eastern time
