= 2003 Connecticut Huskies football team =

American college football season

2003 Connecticut Huskies football
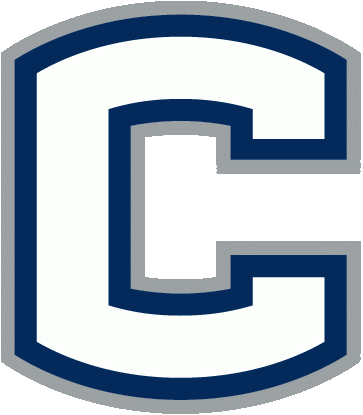
- Conference: Independent
- Record: 9–3
- Head coach: Randy Edsall (5th season)
- Offensive coordinator: Norries Wilson (2nd season)
- Offensive scheme: Multiple
- Defensive coordinator: Hank Hughes (2nd season)
- Base defense: 4–3
- Home stadium: Rentschler Field

2003 NCAA Division I-A independents football records
	Conf.			Overall
Team	W		L	W		L
Connecticut		–		9	–	3
Navy		–		8	–	5
Troy State		–		6	–	6
Notre Dame		–		5	–	7
Rankings from AP Poll

The 2003 Connecticut Huskies football team represented the University of Connecticut as an independent during the 2003 NCAA Division I-A football season. Led by fifth-year head coach Randy Edsall, the Huskies compiled a record of 9–3. The team played home games as the newly-opened Rentschler Field in East Hartford, Connecticut.

== Schedule ==
Date	Time	Opponent	Site	TV	Result	Attendance	Source
August 30	12:00 pm	Indiana	Rentschler Field; East Hartford, CT		W 34–10	38,109	
September 6	1:00 pm	at Army	Michie Stadium; West Point, NY		W 48–21	30,523	
September 13	12:00 pm	Boston College	Rentschler Field; East Hartford, CT	ESPN Plus	L 14–24	40,000	
September 20	6:00 pm	at Buffalo	University at Buffalo Stadium; Amherst, NY		W 38–7	10,107	
September 27	12:00 pm	at No. 5 Virginia Tech	Lane Stadium; Blacksburg, VA	ESPN Plus	L 13–47	65,115	
October 4	12:00 pm	No. 24 (I-AA) Lehigh^{†}	Rentschler Field; East Hartford, CT		W 35–17	35,322	
October 11	1:00 pm	at NC State	Carter–Finley Stadium; Raleigh, NC		L 24–31	50,119	
October 18	2:00 pm	at Kent State	Dix Stadium; Kent, OH		W 34–31 ^{OT}	8,228	
October 25	12:00 pm	Akron	Rentschler Field; East Hartford, CT		W 38–37	36,074	
November 1	12:00 pm	Western Michigan	Rentschler Field; East Hartford, CT		W 41–27	32,851	
November 8	12:00 pm	Rutgers	Rentschler Field; East Hartford, CT	ESPN Plus	W 38–31	40,000	
November 15	3:30 pm	at Wake Forest	Groves Stadium; Winston-Salem, NC		W 51–17	22,435	
^{†}Homecoming; Rankings from AP Poll released prior to the game; All times are in Eastern time
