= 2003 Northern Illinois Huskies football team =

American college football season

2003 Northern Illinois Huskies football
- Conference: Mid-American Conference
- West Division
- Record: 10–2 (6–2 MAC)
- Head coach: Joe Novak (8th season)
- Offensive coordinator: Matt Canada (1st season)
- MVPs: Michael Turner; Vinson Reynolds
- Captains: Randee Drew; Nick Duffy; P. J. Fleck; Akil Grant; Michael Turner
- Home stadium: Huskie Stadium

2003 Mid-American Conference football standings
	Conf.			Overall
Team	W		L	W		L
East Division
No. 10 Miami (OH) x$	8	–	0	13	–	1
Marshall	6	–	2	8	–	4
Akron	5	–	3	7	–	5
Kent State	4	–	4	5	–	7
UCF	2	–	6	3	–	9
Ohio	1	–	7	2	–	10
Buffalo	1	–	7	1	–	11
West Division
No. 23 Bowling Green x	7	–	1	11	–	3
Northern Illinois	6	–	2	10	–	2
Toledo	6	–	2	8	–	4
Western Michigan	4	–	4	5	–	7
Ball State	3	–	5	4	–	8
Eastern Michigan	2	–	6	3	–	9
Central Michigan	1	–	7	3	–	9
Championship: Miami 49, Bowling Green 27
$ – Conference champion; x – Division champion/co-champions; Rankings from AP Poll

The 2003 Northern Illinois Huskies football team represented Northern Illinois University as a member of the West Division of the Mid-American Conference (MAC) during the 2003 NCAA Division I-A football season. Led by eighth-year head coach Joe Novak, the Huskies compiled an overall record of 10–2 with a mark of 6–2 in conference play, placing second in the MAC's West Division. Despite reaching bowl eligibility, Northern Illinois was not invited to a bowl game since the MAC only had two bowl tie-ins which went to those playing in the conference championship. The team played home games at Huskie Stadium in DeKalb, Illinois.

== Schedule ==
Date	Time	Opponent	Rank	Site	TV	Result	Attendance	Source
August 28	6:30 pm	No. 15 Maryland*		Huskie Stadium; DeKalb, IL	FSN	W 20–13 ^{OT}	28,018	
September 6	12:00 pm	Tennessee Tech*		Huskie Stadium; DeKalb, IL		W 42–17	18,123	
September 20	6:00 pm	at No. 21 Alabama*		Bryant–Denny Stadium; Tuscaloosa, AL	PPV	W 19–16	83,818	
September 27	3:00 pm	Iowa State*	No. 20	Huskie Stadium; DeKalb, IL		W 24–16	28,218	
October 4	6:30 pm	Ohio	No. 17	Huskie Stadium; DeKalb, IL	PPV	W 30–23 ^{OT}	21,736	
October 11	12:00 pm	at Central Michigan	No. 16	Kelly/Shorts Stadium; Mount Pleasant, MI		W 40–24	23,268	
October 18	3:00 pm	Western Michigan^{†}	No. 12	Huskie Stadium; DeKalb, IL		W 37–10	28,221	
October 25	3:00 pm	at No. 23 Bowling Green	No. 12	Doyt Perry Stadium; Bowling Green, OH (College GameDay)	ESPN2	L 18–34	31,007	
November 1	1:00 pm	Ball State	No. 21	Huskie Stadium; DeKalb, IL (rivalry)	FSN	W 48–23	24,121	
November 8	12:00 pm	at Buffalo	No. 23	University at Buffalo Stadium; Amherst, NY		W 40–9	5,127	
November 15	2:00 pm	at Toledo	No. 21	Glass Bowl; Toledo, OH	FSN	L 30–49	20,929	
November 22	1:00 pm	Eastern Michigan		Huskie Stadium; DeKalb, IL		W 38–24	16,589	
*Non-conference game; ^{†}Homecoming; Rankings from AP Poll released prior to the game; All times are in Central time

== Rankings ==
Ranking movements Legend: ██ Increase in ranking ██ Decrease in ranking — = Not ranked RV = Received votes
	Week																
Poll	Pre	1	2	3	4	5	6	7	8	9	10	11	12	13	14	15	Final
AP	—	RV	RV	RV	20	17	16	12	12	21	23	21	RV	RV	RV	RV	RV
Coaches	—	RV	RV	RV	22	20	18	16	14	22	23	21	RV	RV	RV	RV	RV
BCS	Not released								10	23	22	21	—	—	—	—	Not released
