= 2003 Central Michigan Chippewas football team =

American college football season

2003 Central Michigan Chippewas football
- Conference: Mid-American Conference
- West Division
- Record: 3–9 (1–7 MAC)
- Head coach: Mike DeBord (4th season)
- Defensive coordinator: Bob Bartolomeo (1st season)
- MVP: James King
- Home stadium: Kelly/Shorts Stadium

2003 Mid-American Conference football standings
	Conf.			Overall
Team	W		L	W		L
East Division
No. 10 Miami (OH) x$	8	–	0	13	–	1
Marshall	6	–	2	8	–	4
Akron	5	–	3	7	–	5
Kent State	4	–	4	5	–	7
UCF	2	–	6	3	–	9
Ohio	1	–	7	2	–	10
Buffalo	1	–	7	1	–	11
West Division
No. 23 Bowling Green x	7	–	1	11	–	3
Northern Illinois	6	–	2	10	–	2
Toledo	6	–	2	8	–	4
Western Michigan	4	–	4	5	–	7
Ball State	3	–	5	4	–	8
Eastern Michigan	2	–	6	3	–	9
Central Michigan	1	–	7	3	–	9
Championship: Miami 49, Bowling Green 27
$ – Conference champion; x – Division champion/co-champions; Rankings from AP Poll

The 2003 Central Michigan Chippewas football team represented Central Michigan University in the Mid-American Conference (MAC) during the 2003 NCAA Division I-A football season. In their fourth and final season under head coach Mike DeBord, the Chippewas compiled a 3–9 record (1–7 against MAC opponents), finished in last place in the MAC's West Division, and were outscored by their opponents, 428 to 277. The team played its home games in Kelly/Shorts Stadium in Mount Pleasant, Michigan, with attendance of 83,512 in six home games.

The team's statistical leaders included Derrick Vickers with 1,345 passing yards, Jerry Seymour with 1,117 rushing yards, and Justin Harper with 441 receiving yards. Defensive back James King was selected at the end of the 2003 season as the team's most valuable player.

On December 17, 2003, Mike DeBord resigned as the Chippewas' head football coach. He compiled a 12-34 record in four years in the position.

== Schedule ==
Date	Opponent	Site	Result	Attendance	Source
August 30	at No. 4 Michigan*	Michigan Stadium; Ann Arbor, MI	L 7–45	110,637	
September 6	New Hampshire*	Kelly/Shorts Stadium; Mount Pleasant, MI	W 40–33		
September 13	Eastern Kentucky*	Kelly/Shorts Stadium; Mount Pleasant, MI	W 42–41		
September 20	at Ball State	Scheumann Stadium; Muncie, IN	L 14–27	10,289	
October 4	at Bowling Green	Doyt Perry Stadium; Bowling Green, OH	L 3–23	20,649	
October 11	No. 16 Northern Illinois	Kelly/Shorts Stadium; Mount Pleasant, MI	L 24–40	23,268	
October 18	Toledo	Kelly/Shorts Stadium; Mount Pleasant, MI	L 13–31	11,343	
October 25	at UCF	Florida Citrus Bowl; Orlando, FL	L 13–31	20,523	
November 1	Eastern Michigan	Kelly/Shorts Stadium; Mount Pleasant, MI (rivalry)	W 38–10	8,391	
November 8	Akron	Kelly/Shorts Stadium; Mount Pleasant, MI	L 28–40	9,222	
November 15	at Western Michigan	Waldo Stadium; Kalamazoo, MI (rivalry)	L 21–44		
November 22	at Navy	Navy–Marine Corps Memorial Stadium; Annapolis, MD	L 34–63		
*Non-conference game; Rankings from AP Poll released prior to the game

== Roster ==
2003 Central Michigan Chippewas football team roster
Players
Coaches
Offense

Pos.	#	Name	Class
WR	2	Jacob Brown	Jr
RB	3	Ramono Flowers	Fr
WR	4	Markus Naves	Fr
WR	5	Justin Harper	So
RB	6	Isaac Brown	Fr
WR	7	Steve Messam	Sr
WR	9	Willie Hill	Sr
QB	10	Derrick Vickers	Sr
RB	13	Lance Gailliard	So
QB	14	Kent Smith	So
RB	15	Jerry Seymour	Fr
QB	16	Nick Gildersleeve	Fr
QB	17	Grant Arnoldink	Jr
WR	18	Lonnell Bess	Fr
RB	19	Mike Pryce	So
OL	68	Jay Gillette	So
C	69	Eric Ghiaciuc	Jr
OT	70	Adam Kieft	Jr
OL	71	Michael Raffaeli	Fr
OT	72	Jeff Jenerou	Jr
OT	73	Tom Langton	Sr
OL	75	Troy Golba	So
OL	77	Dean Zarafonetis	So
OL	78	Drew Mormino	Fr
OL	79	Brandon Zukoff	Fr
WR	80	Scott Gibson	So
WR	81	Obed Cetoute-Genaille	Fr
TE	81	David DuBois	Jr
WR	82	Damien Linson	Fr
WR	83	Nick Thompson	Jr
TE	84	Dave Condeni	Fr
TE	85	Tory Humphrey	Jr
WR	85	Jacob Petzke	Fr
WR	86	Justin Gardner	Fr
TE	86	Dave Kurzen	Jr
TE	87	Joseph Staley	Fr
TE	88	Drew Donaldson	Jr
WR	89	Jovan Witherspoon	Jr

Defense

Pos.	#	Name	Class
CB	8	Tyrone Kelly	Fr
FS	20	Matt Gorman	Fr
SS	22	Mike Thomas	Jr
CB	23	Fabrice Raymond	So
FS	24	James King	Sr
SS	26	Jonathon Nelson	Jr
DT	56	Matt Wohlgemuth	Sr
DE	92	Ike Ajoku	Sr

Special teams

Pos.	#	Name	Class
P	40	Brian Brandt	Sr

Head coach

- Mike DeBord

Coordinators/assistant coaches

Legend

- (C) Team captain
- (S) Suspended
- (I) Ineligible
- Injured
- Redshirt

Roster
