= 2003 Holiday Bowl =

2003 Pacific Life Holiday Bowl
| Washington State Cougars | Texas Longhorns |
| (9–3) | (10–2) |
| Pac-10 | Big 12 |
| 28 | 20 |
| Head coach: Bill Doba | Head coach: Mack Brown |
| AP / Coaches / BCS; 15 / 14 / 16 | AP / Coaches / BCS; 5 / 5 / 6 |
| | 1 | 2 | 3 | 4 | Total |
|---|---|---|---|---|---|
| Washington State | 0 | 7 | 19 | 2 | 28 |
| Texas | 0 | 10 | 0 | 10 | 20 |
- Date: December 30, 2003
- Season: 2003
- Stadium: Qualcomm Stadium
- Location: San Diego, California
- MVP: Offense: Sammy Moore, WSU; Defense: Kyle Basler, WSU
- Favorite: Texas by 9 points
- Referee: Randy Smith (Big East)
- Halftime show: Marching bands
- Attendance: 61,102
- Payout: US$2,013,616 per team

United States TV coverage
- Announcers: ESPN

The 2003 Holiday Bowl was a college football bowl game played on December 30 in San Diego, California, part of the 2003 NCAA Division I-A football season. It featured the Washington State Cougars, and the fifth-ranked Texas Longhorns. Washington State pulled off a 28–20 upset, and moved up to ninth in the final rankings.

Scoreless after the first quarter, Texas running back Cedric Benson scored in the second quarter with a 1-yard touchdown run. Washington State tied the game following a 12-yard touchdown pass from quarterback Matt Kegel to wide receiver Sammy Moore. Following a 39-yard field goal, Texas held a 10–7 lead at halftime.

In the third quarter, Washington State outscored Texas by nineteen points. They took their first lead at 13–10 on a 54-yard touchdown pass from Kegel to Moore. Jonathan Smith rushed 12 yards for a touchdown increasing the lead to 20–10, and the Cougars extended their lead to 26–10 lead after Jason David returned a fumble 18 yards for a touchdown.

Early in the fourth quarter, Texas was held to a field goal; WSU led by thirteen, and the Cougars added a safety as Texas was flagged for holding in their own end zone. Chance Mock threw a 30-yard touchdown pass to Roy Williams to pull Texas to within 28–20 with over four minutes remaining, but that was the end of the scoring.
