= 2003 Akron Zips football team =

American college football season

2003 Akron Zips football
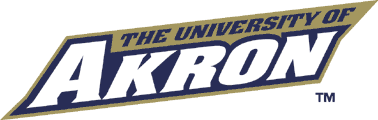
- Conference: Mid-American Conference
- East Division
- Record: 7–5 (5–3 MAC)
- Head coach: Lee Owens (9th season)
- Offensive coordinator: Paul Winters (9th season)
- Defensive coordinator: Joe Tresey (2nd season)
- Home stadium: Rubber Bowl

2003 Mid-American Conference football standings
	Conf.			Overall
Team	W		L	W		L
East Division
No. 10 Miami (OH) x$	8	–	0	13	–	1
Marshall	6	–	2	8	–	4
Akron	5	–	3	7	–	5
Kent State	4	–	4	5	–	7
UCF	2	–	6	3	–	9
Ohio	1	–	7	2	–	10
Buffalo	1	–	7	1	–	11
West Division
No. 23 Bowling Green x	7	–	1	11	–	3
Northern Illinois	6	–	2	10	–	2
Toledo	6	–	2	8	–	4
Western Michigan	4	–	4	5	–	7
Ball State	3	–	5	4	–	8
Eastern Michigan	2	–	6	3	–	9
Central Michigan	1	–	7	3	–	9
Championship: Miami 49, Bowling Green 27
$ – Conference champion; x – Division champion/co-champions; Rankings from AP Poll

The 2003 Akron Zips football team represented the University of Akron in the 2003 NCAA Division I-A football season. Akron competed as a member of the East Division of the Mid-American Conference (MAC). The Zips were led by head coach Lee Owens.

== Schedule ==
Date	Time	Opponent	Site	TV	Result	Attendance	Source
August 28	7:30 p.m.	Kent State	Rubber Bowl; Akron, OH (Wagon Wheel)		L 38–41	26,814	
September 6	3:30 p.m.	at No. 18 Wisconsin*	Camp Randall Stadium; Madison, WI	ESPN Plus	L 31–48	75,401	
September 13	6:00 p.m.	Eastern Michigan	Rubber Bowl; Akron, OH		W 24–17	10,262	
September 20	7:00 p.m.	Howard*	Rubber Bowl; Akron, OH		W 65–7	20,259	
September 27	6:00 p.m.	at Buffalo	University at Buffalo Stadium; Amherst, NY		W 38–21	6,385	
October 4	2:00 p.m.	at Miami (OH)	Yager Stadium; Oxford, OH		L 20–45	20,157	
October 11	6:00 p.m.	No. 24 (I-AA) Cal Poly*	Rubber Bowl; Akron, OH		W 45–14	8,319	
October 18	6:00 p.m.	UCF	Rubber Bowl; Akron, OH		W 38–24	8,113	
October 25	12:00 p.m.	at Connecticut*	Rentschler Field; East Hartford, CT		L 37–38	36,074	
November 1	4:30 p.m.	at Marshall	Joan C. Edwards Stadium; Huntington, WV	ESPNGP	L 24–42	29,884	
November 8	1:00 p.m.	at Central Michigan	Kelly/Shorts Stadium; Mount Pleasant, MI		W 40–28	9,222	
November 15	12:00 p.m.	Ohio	Rubber Bowl; Akron, OH		W 35–28	9,102	
*Non-conference game; Rankings from AP Poll released prior to the game; All times are in Eastern time

== Roster ==
2003 Akron Zips football team roster
Players
Coaches
Offense

Pos.	#	Name	Class
WR	2	Matthew Cherry	Sr
QB	5	Charlie Frye	Jr

Defense

Pos.	#	Name	Class
DB	1	Rickey McKenzie	Sr
DB	4	Sekai Greer	Jr
DB	23	Domenik Hixon	So
DB	24	Montae Russell	Jr
LB	44	Chase Blackburn	Jr
LB	58	Matt Robinson	Sr

Special teams

Pos.	#	Name	Class
P/K	14	Billy Sullivan	So

Head coach

- Lee Owens

Coordinators/assistant coaches

Legend

- (C) Team captain
- (S) Suspended
- (I) Ineligible
- Injured
- Redshirt
