= Terry Hoeppner =

American football player and coach (1947–2007)

Biographical details
- Born: August 19, 1947; Woodburn, Indiana, U.S.
- Died: June 19, 2007 (aged 59); Bloomington, Indiana, U.S.

Playing career
- 1965–1968: Franklin (IN)
- 1972: Indiana Caps
- 1974: Detroit Wheels
- 1975: Charlotte Hornets
- Position: Safety

Coaching career (HC unless noted)
- 1970–1972: Eastbrook HS (IN)
- 1974–1975: Pinson Valley HS (AL) (AHC)
- 1976–1978: Mullins HS (SC)
- 1979: East Noble HS (IN)
- 1980–1985: Franklin (IN) (DC)
- 1986–1992: Miami (OH) (LB)
- 1993–1998: Miami (OH) (AHC)
- 1999–2004: Miami (OH)
- 2005–2006: Indiana

Head coaching record
- Overall: 57–39 (college)
- Bowls: 1–1

Accomplishments and honors

Championships
- 1 Mid-American (2003); 2 Mid-American East Division (2003–2004)

Awards
- MAC Coach of the Year (2003)

Terry Lee Hoeppner (August 19, 1947 – June 19, 2007) was an American college football coach who served as head coach of the Miami RedHawks in Oxford, Ohio from 1999 to 2004 and the Indiana Hoosiers from 2005 to 2006. Shortly after announcing that he would be on medical leave for the 2007 season, he died of brain cancer.

Hoeppner was a 1969 graduate of Franklin College, where he was a member of the Phi Delta Theta international fraternity. He played for the Indiana Caps of the Midwest Football League, and Detroit Wheels and Charlotte Hornets of the World Football League. He owned a 57–39 overall record as a collegiate head coach. He is a member of the Indiana Football Hall of Fame.

== Family ==
Terry and Jane Hoeppner had three children: Drew Hoeppner, Amy Fox, and Allison Hoeppner. Allison was killed in an automobile accident on September 24, 2016.

== Professional career ==
Hoepper signed with the St. Louis Cardinals of the National Football League as an undrafted free agent in May 1969. He left the team during training camp due to an injury. He played for the Indiana Caps of the Midwest Football League in 1972. Hoeppner signed with the Green Bay Packers of the NFL in 1973, but they released him before the season on August 28, 1973. He played for the Detroit Wheels of the World Football League in 1974. The Wheels folded after the 1974 season, and Hoeppner was selected by the Charlotte Hornets in a WFL dispersal draft in October 1974.

== High school coach ==
Hoeppner was a head coach of Eastbrook High School in Marion, Indiana (1970–1972), Pinson Valley High School in Pinson, Alabama (1973–1976), Mullins High School in Mullins, South Carolina (1976–1978) and East Noble High School in Kendallville, Indiana (1979).

== College assistant coach ==
Hoeppner's first job as an assistant coach was at his alma mater, Franklin College, where he served as defensive coordinator. He spent six years there before moving to Miami University as a linebacker coach in 1986. After 12 years, Hoeppner worked his way up to assistant head coach and defensive coordinator. He was also able to retain his positions after head coach Tim Rose was replaced prior to the 1990 season by the late Randy Walker. Hoeppner was instrumental in the development of several NFL players, including JoJuan Armour, Dustin Cohen, and Sheldon White.

== College head coach ==
=== Miami University ===
After spending 13 years as an assistant at Miami, Hoeppner became the RedHawks' 31st head coach in 1999. He succeeded Walker, who was named head coach at Northwestern. Hoeppner's first game at Miami was against Walker and the Wildcats, which resulted in a 28–3 Miami victory. Despite the win, his first year was considered by some to be a disappointment. The RedHawks were coming off a 10–1 season, and returned several starters including record-breaking running back Travis Prentice, but were only able to post a 7–4 record. The dropoff was attributed in part to Hoeppner's installation of an open passing attack, rather than the running game Walker had used in the past. The change ended up paying dividends later, as Miami earned a 48–25 overall record under Hoeppner and finished among the top three in the Mid-American Conference East in each of his six years at the helm. While at Miami, Hoeppner recruited and signed Ben Roethlisberger by promising to play him at quarterback, whereas other programs were recruiting Roethlisberger as a wide receiver or a tight end. Roethlisberger went on to achieve great success in the National Football League (NFL) as quarterback of the Pittsburgh Steelers. Hoeppner's best season was 2003 when Miami, quarterbacked by Roethlisberger, went 13–1 and finished No. 10 in the final AP Poll.

=== Indiana ===
During his first year as head coach at Indiana University, Hoeppner tried to resurrect life into the program through his campaign entitled "Coach Hep wants you." Hoeppner and the Hoosiers began the season 4–1 before losing their last six games. After the season, Hoeppner was diagnosed with a brain tumor. The following year, the Hoosiers once again started strong, but eventually fell one game short of Hoeppner's goal of reaching a college bowl berth. His oft quoted mantra was "Play 13." In 2007, the inspired Hoosiers succeeded in Hoeppner's goal and became eligible to participate in the Insight Bowl.

In September 2006, Hoeppner required additional brain surgery, causing him to miss two weeks of the regular season. He returned to the team to coach against Wisconsin.

== Death ==
On March 18, 2007, it was revealed that he would sit out the 2007 spring practices for health reasons. IU announced in June 2007 that Hoeppner would be on a medical leave of absence for the entire 2007 season and that assistant coach Bill Lynch would serve as head coach. Shortly after the announcement, Hoeppner died from complications from his brain cancer.

== Head coaching record ==
=== College ===
Year	Team	Overall	Conference	Standing	Bowl/playoffs	Coaches^{#}	AP^{°}
Miami RedHawks (Mid-American Conference) (1999–2004)
1999	Miami	7–4	6–2	2nd (East)			
2000	Miami	6–5	5–3	T–3rd (East)			
2001	Miami	7–5	6–2	T–2nd (East)			
2002	Miami	7–5	5–3	3rd (East)			
2003	Miami	13–1	8–0	1st (East)	W GMAC	12	10
2004	Miami	8–5	7–1	1st (East)	L Independence		
Miami:		48–25	37–11				
Indiana Hoosiers (Big Ten Conference) (2005–2006)
2005	Indiana	4–7	1–7	10th			
2006	Indiana	5–7	3–5	T–6th			
Indiana:		9–14	4–12				
Total:		57–39					
National championship Conference title Conference division title or championship game berth
^{#}Rankings from final Coaches Poll.; ^{°}Rankings from final AP Poll.
