= 2003 Bowling Green Falcons football team =

American college football season

2003 Bowling Green Falcons football

MAC West Division champion Motor City Bowl champion

MAC Championship Game, L 27–49 vs. Miami (OH)

Motor City Bowl, W 28–24 vs. Northwestern
- Conference: Mid-American Conference
- West

Ranking
- Coaches: No. 23
- AP: No. 23
- Record: 11–3 (7–1 MAC)
- Head coach: Gregg Brandon (1st season)
- Offensive coordinator: Greg Studrawa (1st season)
- Offensive scheme: Spread
- Defensive coordinator: Tim Beckman (6th season)
- Base defense: 4–3
- Home stadium: Doyt Perry Stadium

2003 Mid-American Conference football standings
	Conf.			Overall
Team	W		L	W		L
East Division
No. 10 Miami (OH) x$	8	–	0	13	–	1
Marshall	6	–	2	8	–	4
Akron	5	–	3	7	–	5
Kent State	4	–	4	5	–	7
UCF	2	–	6	3	–	9
Ohio	1	–	7	2	–	10
Buffalo	1	–	7	1	–	11
West Division
No. 23 Bowling Green x	7	–	1	11	–	3
Northern Illinois	6	–	2	10	–	2
Toledo	6	–	2	8	–	4
Western Michigan	4	–	4	5	–	7
Ball State	3	–	5	4	–	8
Eastern Michigan	2	–	6	3	–	9
Central Michigan	1	–	7	3	–	9
Championship: Miami 49, Bowling Green 27
$ – Conference champion; x – Division champion/co-champions; Rankings from AP Poll

The 2003 Bowling Green Falcons football team represented Bowling Green State University in the 2003 NCAA Division I-A football season. The team was coached by Gregg Brandon and played their home games in Doyt Perry Stadium in Bowling Green, Ohio. It was the 85th season of play for the Falcons.

On October 25, Bowling Green hosted ESPN College GameDay, a first in MAC history.

The Falcons won the 2003 Motor City Bowl by beating Northwestern, 28–24.

== Schedule ==
Date	Time	Opponent	Rank	Site	TV	Result	Attendance
August 28	7:00 pm	Eastern Kentucky*		Doyt Perry Stadium; Bowling Green, Ohio		W 63–13	15,669
September 6	1:00 pm	at No. 16 Purdue*		Ross–Ade Stadium; West Lafayette, Indiana		W 27–26	58,225
September 13	6:00 pm	Liberty*		Doyt Perry Stadium; Bowling Green, Ohio		W 62–3	13,096
September 20	12:00 pm	at No. 5 Ohio State*		Ohio Stadium; Columbus, Ohio	ESPN+	L 17–24	104,358
October 4	4:00 pm	Central Michigan^{†}		Doyt Perry Stadium; Bowling Green, Ohio		W 23–3	20,649
October 11	2:00 pm	at Western Michigan		Waldo Stadium; Kalamazoo, Michigan		W 32–21	23,843
October 18	6:00 pm	at Eastern Michigan		Rynearson Stadium; Ypsilanti, Michigan		W 33–20	6,154
October 25	4:00 pm	No. 12 Northern Illinois	No. 23	Doyt Perry Stadium; Bowling Green, Ohio (College GameDay)	ESPN2	W 34–18	31,007
November 4	7:30 pm	at Miami (OH)	No. 15	Yager Stadium; Oxford, Ohio	ESPN2	L 10–33	28,023
November 15	6:00 pm	Kent State	No. 25	Doyt Perry Stadium; Bowling Green, Ohio (Battle for the Anniversary Award)		W 42–33	12,035
November 22	1:00 pm	at Ball State	No. 22	Ball State Stadium; Muncie, Indiana		W 41–14	8,325
November 28	12:00 pm	Toledo	No. 22	Doyt Perry Stadium; Bowling Green, Ohio (Peace Pipe Trophy)	ESPN	W 31–23	29,724
December 4	12:00 pm	No. 14 Miami (OH)	No. 20	Doyt Perry Stadium; Bowling Green, Ohio (MAC Championship Game)	ESPN	L 27–49	24,833
December 26	5:00 pm	vs. Northwestern*		Ford Field; Detroit (Motor City Bowl)	ESPN	W 28–24	51,286
*Non-conference game; ^{†}Homecoming; Rankings from AP Poll released prior to the game; All times are in Eastern time
