= 2003 GMAC Bowl =

Miami RedHawks	Louisville Cardinals
(12–1)	(9–3)
MAC	C-USA
49	28
Head coach: Terry Hoeppner	Head coach: Bobby Petrino
AP / Coaches / BCS; 14 / 15 / 11
	1	2	3	4	Total
Miami	21	14	0	14	49
Louisville	0	21	7	0	28
- Date: December 18, 2003
- Season: 2003
- Stadium: Ladd–Peebles Stadium
- Location: Mobile, Alabama
- MVP: Miami (OH) QB Ben Roethlisberger
- Referee: Cooper Castleberry (Big XII)
- Attendance: 40,620

United States TV coverage
- Network: ESPN
- Announcers: Mark Jones (Play-by-Play); Bob Davie (Color Analyst); Holly Rowe (Sideline Reporter)

The 2003 GMAC Bowl was an American college football bowl game. It was part of the 2003 NCAA Division I-A football season. The game featured the Louisville Cardinals, and the Miami RedHawks.

== Game summary ==
Miami started the scoring with quarterback Ben Roethlisberger throwing a 28-yard touchdown pass to wide receiver Michael Larkin to post an early 7–0 lead. Later in the quarter, running back Cal Murray scored on a two-yard touchdown run to give the Redhawks a 14–0 lead. Ben Roethlisberger threw a 12-yard touchdown pass to wide receiver Martin Nance to give Miami a 21–0 first quarter lead.

Early in the second quarter, Lionel Gates scored a rushing touchdown for Louisville to make it 21–7. Ben Roethlisberger threw a 16-yard touchdown pass to Matt Brandt, and the lead was 28–7. Roethlisberger threw another touchdown pass to Michael Larkin, to give Miami a 35–7 lead. Louisville running back Michael Bush threw a 31-yard touchdown pass to wide receiver JR Russell to make it 35–14. Before halftime, quarterback Stefan LeFors threw a 2-yard touchdown pass to Russell, and the halftime score was Miami 35, Louisville 21.

Stefan Lefors threw a 24-yard touchdown pass to Russell in the third quarter, to make the score 35–28 Miami, but Louisville would get no closer. Mike Smith scored on a 3-yard touchdown run, and Matt Pusateri returned an interception 35 yards for a touchdown to make the final score 49–28.

== Statistics ==
Statistics	Miami (Ohio)	Louisville
First downs	28	22
Rushing yards	221	237
Passes (C-A-I)	26-35-0	30-49-1
Passing yards	376	255
Total yards	597	492
Punts-average	4–30.0	4–42.2
Fumbles-lost	2–0	1–0
Penalties-yards	8–73	5–58
Third down conv.	5–10	4–11
Possession time	30:52	29:08
