= Ellicott, Colorado =

Census-designated place in El Paso County, Colorado, United States

- Census-designated place
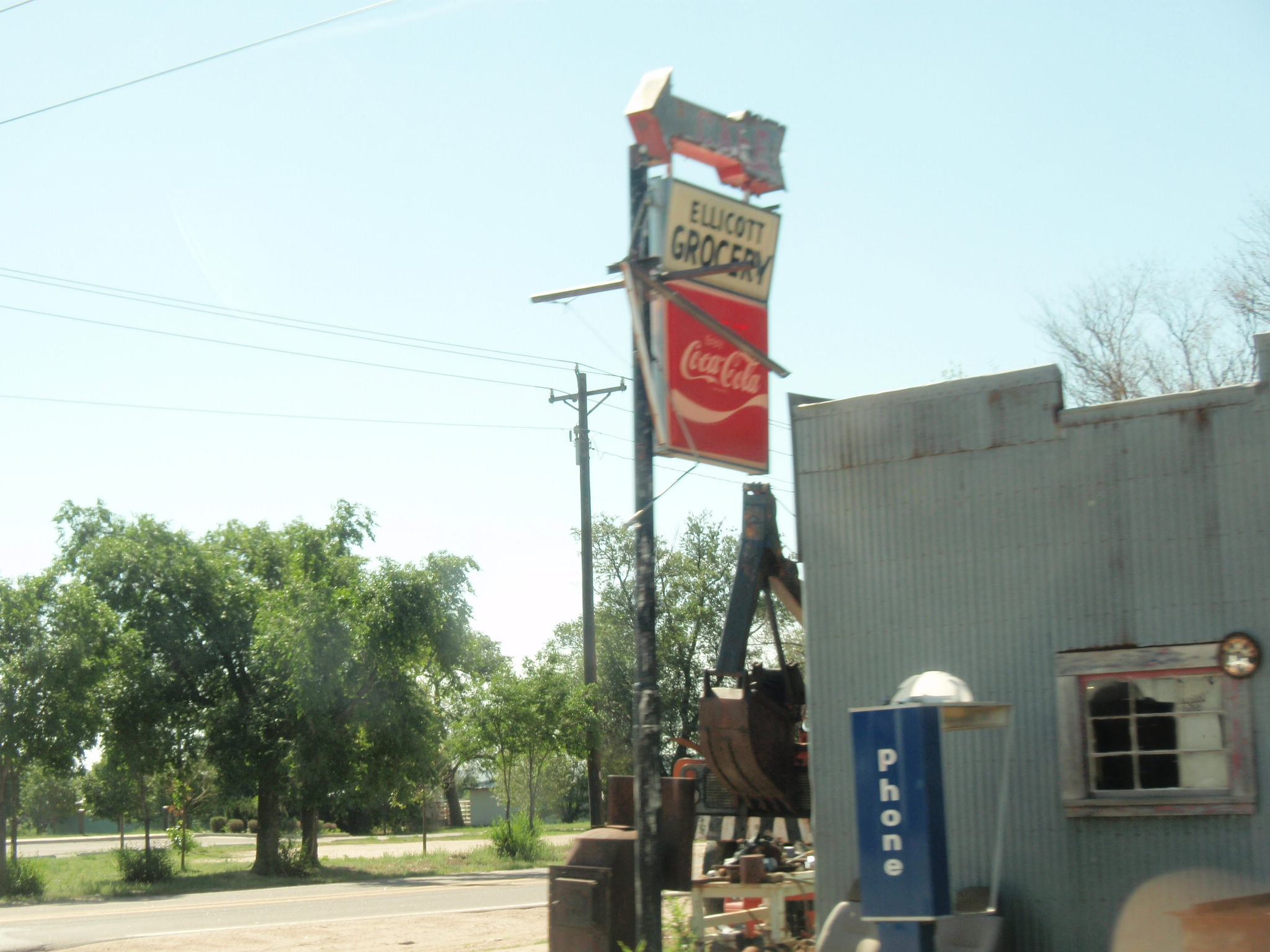
- Ellicott Grocery in Ellicott.

- Location of the Ellicott CDP in El Paso County, Colorado
- Coordinates: 38°49′15″N 104°22′34″W
- Country: United States
- State: Colorado
- County: El Paso

Government
  - Type: Unincorporated community
  - Body: El Paso County

Area
  - Total: 10.922 sq mi (28.287 km^{2})
  - Land: 10.922 sq mi (28.287 km^{2})
  - Water: 0 sq mi (0.000 km^{2})
- Elevation: 6,021 ft (1,835 m)

Population (2020)
  - Total: 1,248
  - Density: 114.3/sq mi (44.12/km^{2})
- Time zone: UTC−07:00 (MST)
  - Summer (DST): UTC−06:00 (MDT)
- ZIP code: Calhan 80808
- Area code: 719
- GNIS town ID: 2629987
- FIPS code: 08 24235

Ellicott is an unincorporated community and a census-designated place (CDP) located in and governed by El Paso County, Colorado, United States. The CDP is a part of the Colorado Springs, CO Metropolitan Statistical Area. The population of the Ellicott CDP was 1,248 at the United States Census 2020.

== History ==
The Ellicott, Colorado, post office operated from April 29, 1895, until July 31, 1916. The Calhan, Colorado, post office (ZIP code 80808) now serves the area.

== Geography ==
The Ellicott CDP has an area of 6,990 acres (28.287 km^{2}), all land.

== Demographics ==
The United States Census Bureau initially defined the Ellicott CDP for the United States Census 2010.

Ellicott CDP, Colorado
Year	Pop.	±%
2010	1,131	—
2020	1,248	+10.3%
Source: United States Census Bureau

=== 2020 census ===
As of the 2020 census, Ellicott had a population of 1,248. The median age was 35.7 years. 31.7% of residents were under the age of 18 and 13.9% were 65 years of age or older. For every 100 females, there were 97.5 males, and for every 100 females age 18 and over, there were 92.8 males age 18 and over.

0.0% of residents lived in urban areas, while 100.0% lived in rural areas.

There were 398 households in Ellicott, of which 37.2% had children under the age of 18 living in them. Of all households, 55.8% were married-couple households, 21.6% were households with a male householder and no spouse or partner present, and 16.8% were households with a female householder and no spouse or partner present. About 23.8% of all households were made up of individuals, and 9.3% had someone living alone who was 65 years of age or older.

There were 430 housing units, of which 7.4% were vacant. The homeowner vacancy rate was 7.1%, and the rental vacancy rate was 1.7%.

Racial composition as of the 2020 census
Race	Number	Percent
White	741	59.4%
Black or African American	15	1.2%
American Indian and Alaska Native	18	1.4%
Asian	9	0.7%
Native Hawaiian and Other Pacific Islander	0	0.0%
Some other race	245	19.6%
Two or more races	220	17.6%
Hispanic or Latino (of any race)	484	38.8%

== Education ==
It is in the Ellicott School District 22.

== See also ==
- Front Range Urban Corridor
- List of census-designated places in Colorado
