= 2003 Marshall Thundering Herd football team =

American college football season

2003 Marshall Thundering Herd football
- Conference: Mid-American Conference
- East
- Record: 8–4 (6–2 MAC)
- Head coach: Bob Pruett (8th season)
- Offensive coordinator: Mark McHale (2nd season)
- Co-offensive coordinator: Larry Kueck (3rd season)
- Defensive coordinator: Bill Wilt (2nd season)
- Home stadium: Joan C. Edwards Stadium

2003 Mid-American Conference football standings
	Conf.			Overall
Team	W		L	W		L
East Division
No. 10 Miami (OH) x$	8	–	0	13	–	1
Marshall	6	–	2	8	–	4
Akron	5	–	3	7	–	5
Kent State	4	–	4	5	–	7
UCF	2	–	6	3	–	9
Ohio	1	–	7	2	–	10
Buffalo	1	–	7	1	–	11
West Division
No. 23 Bowling Green x	7	–	1	11	–	3
Northern Illinois	6	–	2	10	–	2
Toledo	6	–	2	8	–	4
Western Michigan	4	–	4	5	–	7
Ball State	3	–	5	4	–	8
Eastern Michigan	2	–	6	3	–	9
Central Michigan	1	–	7	3	–	9
Championship: Miami 49, Bowling Green 27
$ – Conference champion; x – Division champion/co-champions; Rankings from AP Poll

The 2003 Marshall Thundering Herd football team represented Marshall University in the 2003 NCAA Division I-A football season. Despite achieving bowl eligibility with an 8–4 record, Marshall did not make a bowl game for the first time since 1997 due to the Mid-American Conference not having enough bowl tie-ins for its members. The Thundering Herd's upset against sixth-ranked Kansas State highlighted the season.

== Schedule ==
Date	Time	Opponent	Site	TV	Result	Attendance
August 30	4:30 pm	Hofstra*	Marshall University Stadium; Huntington, WV	ESPN+	W 45–21	25,141
September 6	4:00 pm	at No. 12 Tennessee*	Neyland Stadium; Knoxville, TN	ESPN2	L 24–34	106,520
September 12	7:00 pm	Toledo	Marshall University Stadium; Huntington, WV	ESPN	L 17–24	31,511
September 20	12:40 pm	at No. 6 Kansas State*	KSU Stadium; Manhattan, KS	FSN	W 27–20	46,700
September 27	6:00 pm	at Troy State*	Movie Gallery Stadium; Troy, AL	ESPN+	L 24–33	26,000
October 11	4:30 pm	Kent State^{†}	Marshall University Stadium; Huntington, WV		W 49–33	33,537
October 18	1:00 pm	at Buffalo	University at Buffalo Stadium; Amherst, NY	ESPN+	W 26–16	10,118
October 25	2:30 pm	at Western Michigan	Waldo Stadium; Kalamazoo, MI	FSN	W 41–21	15,878
November 1	4:30 pm	Akron	Marshall University Stadium; Huntington, WV	ESPNGP	W 42–24	29,884
November 12	7:30 pm	at No. 23 Miami (OH)	Yager Stadium; Oxford, OH	ESPN2	L 6–45	26,286
November 19	7:30 pm	at UCF	Florida Citrus Bowl; Orlando, FL	ESPN2	W 21–7	18,141
November 28	12:00 pm	Ohio	Marshall University Stadium; Huntington, WV (Battle for the Bell)	FSN	W 28–0	19,113
*Non-conference game; ^{†}Homecoming; Rankings from AP Poll released prior to the game; All times are in Eastern time

== Roster ==
2003 Marshall Thundering Herd football team roster
Players
Coaches
Offense

Pos.	#	Name	Class
WR	82	Josh Davis	Jr
QB	4	Stan Hill	Jr
TE	90	Jason Rader	Sr
WR	40	Darius Watts	Sr

Defense

Pos.	#	Name	Class
DE	50	Johnathan Goddard	Jr

Special teams

Pos.	#	Name	Class

Head coach

- Bob Pruett

Coordinators/assistant coaches

- Lou Anarumo
  (Defensive backs)

Legend

- (C) Team captain
- (S) Suspended
- (I) Ineligible
- Injured
- Redshirt

Roster

== Game summaries ==
=== Kansas State ===
	1	2	3	4	Total
Thundering Herd	7	9	0	11	27
#6 Wildcats	7	3	3	7	20

== Team players drafted in the NFL ==
The following players were selected in the 2004 NFL draft.

Player	Position	Round	Pick	Franchise
Darius Watts	Wide receiver	2	54	Denver Broncos
