= 2003 Miami RedHawks football team =

American college football season

2003 Miami RedHawks football

MAC champion MAC East Division champion GMAC Bowl champion

MAC Championship Game, W 49–27 vs. Bowling Green

GMAC Bowl, W 49–28 vs. Louisville
- Conference: Mid-American Conference
- East Division

Ranking
- Coaches: No. 12
- AP: No. 10
- Record: 13–1 (8–0 MAC)
- Head coach: Terry Hoeppner (5th season)
- Offensive coordinator: Shane Montgomery (3rd season)
- Offensive scheme: Multiple
- Defensive coordinator: Pat Narduzzi (1st season)
- Base defense: 4–3
- Home stadium: Yager Stadium

2003 Mid-American Conference football standings
	Conf.			Overall
Team	W		L	W		L
East Division
No. 10 Miami (OH) x$	8	–	0	13	–	1
Marshall	6	–	2	8	–	4
Akron	5	–	3	7	–	5
Kent State	4	–	4	5	–	7
UCF	2	–	6	3	–	9
Ohio	1	–	7	2	–	10
Buffalo	1	–	7	1	–	11
West Division
No. 23 Bowling Green x	7	–	1	11	–	3
Northern Illinois	6	–	2	10	–	2
Toledo	6	–	2	8	–	4
Western Michigan	4	–	4	5	–	7
Ball State	3	–	5	4	–	8
Eastern Michigan	2	–	6	3	–	9
Central Michigan	1	–	7	3	–	9
Championship: Miami 49, Bowling Green 27
$ – Conference champion; x – Division champion/co-champions; Rankings from AP Poll

The 2003 Miami RedHawks football team represented Miami University in the 2003 NCAA Division I-A football season. They competed in the East Division of the Mid-American Conference (MAC) . The team was coached by Terry Hoeppner and played their homes game in Yager Stadium. The Redhawks finished the season with a record of 13–1 (8–0 MAC). They won the MAC for the first time since 1986 and was invited to the GMAC Bowl, where they beat Louisville 49–28.

== Schedule ==
Date	Time	Opponent	Rank	Site	TV	Result	Attendance
August 30	12:00 pm	at Iowa*		Kinnick Stadium; Iowa City, IA	ESPN2	L 3–21	54,128
September 13	12:00 pm	at Northwestern*		Ryan Field; Evanston, IL	ESPN Plus	W 44–14	24,215
September 20	3:00 pm	at Colorado State*		Hughes Stadium; Fort Collins, CO		W 41–21	31,610
September 27	2:00 pm	Cincinnati*		Yager Stadium; Oxford, OH (Victory Bell)		W 42–37	27,512
October 4	2:00 pm	Akron		Yager Stadium; Oxford, OH		W 45–20	20,157
October 11	2:00 pm	Buffalo		Yager Stadium; Oxford, OH		W 59–3	23,683
October 18	3:00 pm	at Ball State		Ball State Stadium; Muncie, IN	ESPN Plus	W 49–3	18,396
October 25	2:00 pm	at Kent State		Dix Stadium; Kent, OH	ESPN Plus	W 38–30	10,693
November 4	7:30 pm	No. 15 Bowling Green		Yager Stadium; Oxford, OH	ESPN2	W 33–10	28,023
November 12	7:30 pm	Marshall	No. 23	Yager Stadium; Oxford, OH	ESPN2	W 45–6	26,286
November 22	2:30 pm	at Ohio	No. 18	Peden Stadium; Athens, OH (Battle of the Bricks)	FSN	W 49–31	14,327
November 28	1:00 pm	at UCF	No. 15	Florida Citrus Bowl; Orlando, FL		W 56–21	12,902
December 4	7:00 pm	at No. 20 Bowling Green	No. 14	Doyt Perry Stadium; Bowling Green, OH (MAC Championship Game)	ESPN	W 49–27	24,813
December 18	8:30 pm	vs. Louisville*	No. 14	Ladd–Peebles Stadium; Mobile, AL (GMAC Bowl)	ESPN	W 49–28	40,620
*Non-conference game; Rankings from AP Poll released prior to the game; All times are in Eastern time

== Roster ==
2003 Miami RedHawks football team roster
Players
Coaches
Offense

Pos.	#	Name	Class
WR	5	Andre Henderson	So
WR	6	Michael Larkin	Jr
QB	7	Ben Roethlisberger	Jr
QB	8	Josh Betts	So
OL	60	Dan Kosta	Sr
OL	61	Dave Rehker	Jr
OL	62	Todd Londot	So
OL	64	Ben Hartings	Jr
OL	66	Joe Serina	Sr
OL	70	Ryan Meyer	So
OL	71	Ben Herrell	Sr
OL	74	Jacob Bell	Sr
OL	75	Mark Kracium	So
OL	76	Chris Fessel	So
OL	78	Kenneth Getch	So
OL	79	Nate Bunce	So
WR	82	R. J. Corbin	So
WR	83	Calvin Blackmon	Jr
TE	84	Tyler Vogel	So
TE	87	Matt Brandt	Sr
WR	88	Korey Kirkpatrick	Sr
TE	89	Dan Tyler	So
TE	90	Geoff Robinson	Sr

Defense

Pos.	#	Name	Class
DL	47	Jeremy Thompson	Jr
DL	48	Bill Lautar	So
DL	49	Will Stanley	Sr
DL	65	John Glavin	So

Special teams

Pos.	#	Name	Class

Head coach

- Terry Hoeppner

Coordinators/assistant coaches

Legend

- (C) Team captain
- (S) Suspended
- (I) Ineligible
- Injured
- Redshirt

== Game summaries ==
=== At Iowa ===
	1	2	3	4	Total
RedHawks	3	0	0	0	3
Hawkeyes	7	7	0	7	21

=== At Northwestern ===
	1	2	3	4	Total
RedHawks	7	16	7	14	44
Wildcats	0	7	0	7	14

=== At Colorado State ===
	1	2	3	4	Total
RedHawks	7	10	10	14	41
Rams	7	0	7	7	21

=== Cincinnati ===
	1	2	3	4	Total
Bearcats	0	17	0	20	37
RedHawks	14	14	7	7	42

=== No. 15 Bowling Green ===
	1	2	3	4	Total
No. 15 Falcons	0	7	0	3	10
RedHawks	0	10	14	9	33

=== At No. 20 Bowling Green (MAC Championship Game) ===
	1	2	3	4	Total
No. 14 RedHawks	7	14	21	7	49
No. 20 Falcons	7	10	3	7	27

=== Vs. Louisville (GMAC Bowl) ===
	1	2	3	4	Total
No. 14 RedHawks	21	14	0	14	49
Cardinals	0	21	7	0	28

== After the season ==
=== Comments ===
Two Miami players were drafted into the National Football League: quarterback Ben Roethlisberger, left as a junior without a degree with a year of college eligibility remaining and was selected by the Pittsburgh Steelers in the first round, #11 overall, and guard Jacob Bell, taken by the Tennessee Titans in the fifth round, #138 overall. Roethlisberger's #11 selection was the highest ever draft pick for a player from Miami.

=== Awards ===
The Columbus Dispatch named Hoeppner "Ohio College Coach of the Year." The 2003 team as a whole earned the American Football Coaches Association's "Academic Achievement Honor" for achieving a graduation rate over 70%.
