= 2003 Minnesota Golden Gophers football team =

American college football season

2003 Minnesota Golden Gophers football

Sun Bowl champion

Sun Bowl, W 31–30 vs. Oregon
- Conference: Big Ten Conference

Ranking
- Coaches: No. 17
- AP: No. 20
- Record: 10–3 (5–3 Big Ten)
- Head coach: Glen Mason (7th season)
- Co-offensive coordinators: Mitch Browning (4th season); Tony Petersen (4th season)
- Defensive coordinator: Greg Hudson (1st season)
- Captains: Asad Abdul-Khaliq; Dan Kwapinski; Ben Utecht; Eli Ward
- Home stadium: Hubert H. Humphrey Metrodome

2003 Big Ten Conference football standings
	Conf.			Overall
Team	W		L	W		L
No. 6 Michigan $	7	–	1	10	–	3
No. 4 Ohio State %	6	–	2	11	–	2
No. 18 Purdue	6	–	2	9	–	4
No. 8 Iowa	5	–	3	10	–	3
No. 20 Minnesota	5	–	3	10	–	3
Michigan State	5	–	3	8	–	5
Wisconsin	4	–	4	7	–	6
Northwestern	4	–	4	6	–	7
Penn State	1	–	7	3	–	9
Indiana	1	–	7	2	–	10
Illinois	0	–	8	1	–	11
% – BCS at-large representative; $ – Conference champion; Rankings from AP Poll

The 2003 Minnesota Golden Gophers football team represented the University of Minnesota as a member of the Big Ten Conference during the 2003 NCAA Division I-A football season. In their seventh year under head coach Glen Mason, the Golden Gophers compiled an overall record of 10–3 with a mark of 5–3 in conference play, placing in the three-way tie for fourth in the Big Ten, and outscored opponents 503 to 285. Minnesota was invited to the Sun Bowl, where the Golden Gophers defeated Oregon. The team was ranked 20th in the final AP poll and 17th in the final Coaches Poll. Minnesota played home games at the Hubert H. Humphrey Metrodome in Minneapolis.

== Schedule ==
Date	Time	Opponent	Rank	Site	TV	Result	Attendance
August 30	6:00 pm	Tulsa*		Hubert H. Humphrey Metrodome; Minneapolis, MN		W 49–10	36,623
September 6	7:00 pm	Troy State*		Hubert H. Humphrey Metrodome; Minneapolis, MN	ESPN Plus	W 48–7	31,393
September 13	1:00 pm	at Ohio*		Peden Stadium; Athens, OH	ESPN Plus	W 42–20	20,227
September 20	7:00 pm	Louisiana–Lafayette*		Hubert H. Humphrey Metrodome; Minneapolis, MN		W 48–14	34,929
September 27	11:00 am	at Penn State	No. 24	Beaver Stadium; University Park, PA (Governor's Victory Bell)	ESPN	W 20–14	106,735
October 4	11:00 am	at Northwestern	No. 21	Ryan Field; Evanston, IL	ESPN Plus	W 42–17	23,539
October 10	7:00 pm	No. 20 Michigan	No. 17	Hubert H. Humphrey Metrodome; Minneapolis, MN (Little Brown Jug)	ESPN	L 35–38	62,374
October 18	11:00 am	No. 15 Michigan State	No. 25	Hubert H. Humphrey Metrodome; Minneapolis, MN	ESPN2	L 38–44	38,778
October 25	11:00 am	at Illinois		Memorial Stadium; Champaign, IL	ESPN Plus	W 36–10	46,407
November 1	1:00 pm	Indiana	No. 24	Hubert H. Humphrey Metrodome; Minneapolis, MN		W 55–7	45,398
November 8	11:00 am	Wisconsin	No. 24	Hubert H. Humphrey Metrodome; Minneapolis, MN (rivalry)	ESPN	W 37–34	59,543
November 15	11:00 am	at No. 20 Iowa	No. 19	Kinnick Stadium; Iowa City, IA (rivalry)	ESPN2	L 22–40	70,397
December 31	1:00 pm	vs. Oregon*	No. 24	Sun Bowl; El Paso, TX (Sun Bowl)	CBS	W 31–30	49,894
*Non-conference game; Rankings from AP Poll released prior to the game; All times are in Central time

.

== Game summaries ==
=== Wisconsin ===
Wisconsin at #24/18 Minnesota

Team	1	2	3	4	Total
Wisconsin	3	10	14	7	34
• Minnesota	10	14	3	10	37

- Date: Saturday, November 8
- Location: Hubert H. Humphrey Metrodome, Minneapolis, Minnesota
- Game start: 12:00 p.m. EST
- Source: ESPN

Scoring summary
1	14:04	MINN	Laurence Maroney 30-yard run (Rhys Lloyd kick)	MINN 7-0
1	7:56	MINN	Rhys Lloyd 34-yard field goal	MINN 10-0
1	:13	WIS	Mike Allen 27-yard field goal	MINN 10-3
2	10:52	MINN	Asad Abdul-Khaliq 13-yard run (Rhys Lloyd kick)	MINN 17-3
2	4:54	WIS	Mike Allen 23-yard field goal	MINN 17-6
2	2:01	MINN	Thomas Tapeh 6-yard run (Rhys Lloyd kick)	MINN 24-6
2	1:25	WIS	Owen Daniels 27-yard pass from Jim Sorgi (Mike Allen kick)	MINN 24-13
3	12:47	WIS	Lee Evans 17-yard pass from Jim Sorgi (Mike Allen kick)	MINN 24-20
3	9:17	MINN	Rhys Lloyd 34-yard field goal	MINN 27-20
3	1:35	WIS	Darrin Charles 12-yard pass from Jim Sorgi (Mike Allen kick)	Tied 27-27
4	11:13	MINN	Marion Barber III 11-yard run (Rhys Lloyd kick)	MINN 34-27
4	7:15	WIS	Owen Daniels 26-yard pass from Jim Sorgi (Mike Allen kick)	Tied 34-34
4	:00	MINN	Rhys Lloyd 35-yard field goal	MINN 37-34

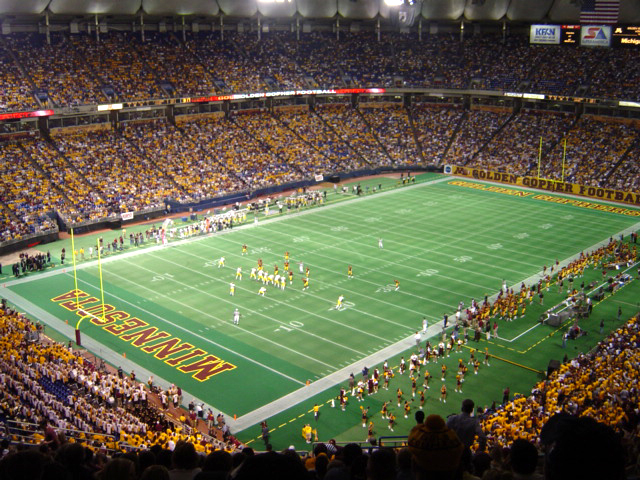
The 2003 Gopher–Wolverine game

== Roster ==
2003 Minnesota Golden Gophers football team roster
Players
Coaches
Offense

Pos.	#	Name	Class
QB	8	Asad Abdul-Khaliq	Sr
RB	21	Marion Barber III	Jr
QB	3	Bryan Cupito	Fr
C	61	Greg Eslinger	Fr
WR	2	Paris Hamilton	Jr
WR	84	Aaron Hosack	Sr
RB	22	Laurence Maroney	Fr
WR	33	Logan Payne	Fr
RB	29	Amir Pinnix	Fr
WR	88	Micah Rucker	Fr
G	68	Mark Setterstrom	So
TE	89	Matt Spaeth	Fr
FB	44	Thomas Tapeh	Sr
TE	82	Ben Utecht	Sr

Defense }

Pos.	#	Name	Class
DT	95	Anthony Montgomery	So
DT	51	Darrell Reid	Jr

Special teams

Pos.	#	Name	Class
K	16	Rhys Lloyd	Jr

Head coach

- Glen Mason

Coordinators/assistant coaches

Legend

- (C) Team captain
- (S) Suspended
- (I) Ineligible
- Injured
- Redshirt
