= 2003 Illinois Fighting Illini football team =

American college football season

2003 Illinois Fighting Illini football
- Conference: Big Ten Conference
- Record: 1–11 (0–8 Big Ten)
- Head coach: Ron Turner (7th season)
- Offensive scheme: Pro-style
- Defensive coordinator: Mike Cassity (3rd season)
- Base defense: 4–3
- Home stadium: Memorial Stadium

2003 Big Ten Conference football standings
| | Conf. | | | Overall |
| Team | W | | L | W | | L |
|---|---|---|---|---|---|---|
| No. 6 Michigan $ | 7 | – | 1 | 10 | – | 3 |
| No. 4 Ohio State % | 6 | – | 2 | 11 | – | 2 |
| No. 18 Purdue | 6 | – | 2 | 9 | – | 4 |
| No. 8 Iowa | 5 | – | 3 | 10 | – | 3 |
| No. 20 Minnesota | 5 | – | 3 | 10 | – | 3 |
| Michigan State | 5 | – | 3 | 8 | – | 5 |
| Wisconsin | 4 | – | 4 | 7 | – | 6 |
| Northwestern | 4 | – | 4 | 6 | – | 7 |
| Penn State | 1 | – | 7 | 3 | – | 9 |
| Indiana | 1 | – | 7 | 2 | – | 10 |
| Illinois | 0 | – | 8 | 1 | – | 11 |
% – BCS at-large representative; $ – Conference champion; Rankings from AP Poll

The 2003 Illinois Fighting Illini football team was an American football team that represented the University of Illinois at Urbana–Champaign as a member of the Big Ten Conference during the 2003 NCAA Division I-A football season. In their seventh season under Ron Turner, the Illini compiled a 1–11 record (0–8 in conference games), finished in last place in the Big Ten, and were outscored by a total of 398 to 203.

The team's statistical leaders included quarterback Jon Beutjer (1,597 passing yards), running back E. B. Halsey (525 rushing yards), wide receiver Kelvin Hayden (52 receptions for 592 yards), and kicker John Gockman (63 points scored, 21 of 21 extra points, 14 of 22 field goals).

The team played its home games at Memorial Stadium in Champaign, Illinois.

== Schedule ==
| Date | Time | Opponent | Site | TV | Result | Attendance | Source |
|---|---|---|---|---|---|---|---|
| August 30 | 11:00 am | vs. Missouri* | Edward Jones Dome; St. Louis, MO | ABC | L 15–22 | 63,576 | |
| September 6 | 11:00 am | Illinois State* | Memorial Stadium; Champaign, IL | ESPN+ | W 49–22 | 56,304 | |
| September 13 | 7:00 pm | at UCLA* | Rose Bowl; Pasadena, CA | ABC | L 3–6 | 51,118 | |
| September 20 | 11:00 am | California* | Memorial Stadium; Champaign, IL | ESPN+ | L 24–31 | 58,363 | |
| September 27 | 5:00 pm | Wisconsin | Memorial Stadium; Champaign, IL | ESPN2 | L 20–38 | 58,495 | |
| October 4 | 11:00 am | at No. 23 Purdue | Ross–Ade Stadium; West Lafayette, IN (Purdue Cannon) | ESPN | L 10–43 | 63,139 | |
| October 11 | 11:00 am | No. 21 Michigan State | Memorial Stadium; Champaign, IL | ESPN | L 14–49 | 47,509 | |
| October 18 | 11:00 am | at No. 17 Michigan | Michigan Stadium; Ann Arbor, MI (rivalry) | ESPN+ | L 14–56 | 110,231 | |
| October 25 | 11:00 am | No. 24 Minnesota^{†} | Memorial Stadium; Champaign, IL | ESPN+ | L 10–36 | 46,407 | |
| November 1 | 11:00 am | at No. 13 Iowa | Kinnick Stadium; Iowa City, IA | ESPN+ | L 10–41 | 70,397 | |
| November 8 | 11:00 am | at Indiana | Memorial Stadium; Bloomington, IN (rivalry) | ESPN+ | L 14–17 | 24,102 | |
| November 22 | 11:00 am | Northwestern | Memorial Stadium; Champaign, IL (Sweet Sioux Tomahawk) | ESPN+ | L 21–38 | 38,688 | |
*Non-conference game; ^{†}Homecoming; Rankings from AP Poll released prior to the game; All times are in Central time

== Roster ==
2003 Illinois Fighting Illini football team roster
Players
Coaches
Offense

| Pos. | # | Name | Class |
|---|---|---|---|
| QB | 7 | Jon Beutjer | Jr |
| OL | 73 | Sean Bubin | Sr |
| FB | 24 | Carey Davis | Sr |
| FB | 34 | Jason Davis | So |
| WR | 6 | Kelvin Hayden | Jr |
| WR | 84 | Kendrick Jones | So |
| RB | 23 | Marcus Mason | Fr |
| QB | 16 | Chris Pazan | Fr |
| C | 75 | Duke Preston | Jr |
| RB | 30 | Pierre Thomas | Fr |

Defense

| Pos. | # | Name | Class |
|---|---|---|---|
| S | 18 | Alan Ball | Fr |
| DL | 59 | Kam Buckner | Fr |
| LB | 48 | Jeremy Leman | Fr |
| S | 42 | Kevin Mitchell | Fr |
| CB | 5 | Christian Morton | Sr |
| DE | 66 | Brian Schaefering | Jr |
| LB | 44 | Matt Sinclair | Jr |
| DE | 98 | Derrick Strong | Sr |

Special teams

| Pos. | # | Name | Class |
|---|---|---|---|
| P | 37 | Steve Weatherford | So |

Head coach

- Ron Turner

Coordinators/assistant coaches

Legend

- (C) Team captain
- (S) Suspended
- (I) Ineligible
- Injured
- Redshirt

Roster
