= 2003 Michigan Wolverines football team =

American college football season

2003 Michigan Wolverines football

Big Ten champion

Rose Bowl, L 14–28 vs. USC
- Conference: Big Ten Conference

Ranking
- Coaches: No. 7
- AP: No. 6
- Record: 10–3 (7–1 Big Ten)
- Head coach: Lloyd Carr (9th season)
- Offensive coordinator: Terry Malone (2nd season)
- Offensive scheme: Multiple
- Defensive coordinator: Jim Herrmann (7th season)
- Base defense: Multiple
- MVP: Chris Perry
- Captains: Grant Bowman; Carl Diggs; John Navarre
- Home stadium: Michigan Stadium

2003 Big Ten Conference football standings
	Conf.			Overall
Team	W		L	W		L
No. 6 Michigan $	7	–	1	10	–	3
No. 4 Ohio State %	6	–	2	11	–	2
No. 18 Purdue	6	–	2	9	–	4
No. 8 Iowa	5	–	3	10	–	3
No. 20 Minnesota	5	–	3	10	–	3
Michigan State	5	–	3	8	–	5
Wisconsin	4	–	4	7	–	6
Northwestern	4	–	4	6	–	7
Penn State	1	–	7	3	–	9
Indiana	1	–	7	2	–	10
Illinois	0	–	8	1	–	11
% – BCS at-large representative; $ – Conference champion; Rankings from AP Poll

The 2003 Michigan Wolverines football team represented the University of Michigan in the 2003 NCAA Division I-A football season. The team's head coach was Lloyd Carr. The Wolverines played their home games at Michigan Stadium. The team won the first of its back-to-back Big Ten championships. The team lost to the USC Trojans 28–14 in the 2004 Rose Bowl.

== Schedule ==
Date	Time	Opponent	Rank	Site	TV	Result	Attendance
August 30	12:10 p.m.	Central Michigan*	No. 4	Michigan Stadium; Ann Arbor, MI	ESPN Plus	W 45–7	110,637
September 6	12:00 p.m.	Houston*	No. 5	Michigan Stadium; Ann Arbor, MI	ESPN	W 50–3	109,580
September 13	3:30 p.m.	No. 15 Notre Dame*	No. 5	Michigan Stadium; Ann Arbor, MI (rivalry, College GameDay)	ABC	W 38–0	111,726
September 20	3:30 p.m.	at No. 22 Oregon*	No. 3	Autzen Stadium; Eugene, OR	ABC	L 27–31	59,023
September 27	12:10 p.m.	Indiana	No. 11	Michigan Stadium; Ann Arbor, MI	ESPN Plus	W 31–17	110,788
October 4	3:30 p.m.	at No. 23 Iowa	No. 9	Kinnick Stadium; Iowa City, IA	ABC	L 27–30	70,397
October 10	7:00 p.m.	at No. 17 Minnesota	No. 20	Hubert H. Humphrey Metrodome; Minneapolis, MN (Little Brown Jug)	ESPN	W 38–35	62,374
October 18	12:00 p.m.	Illinois^{†}	No. 17	Michigan Stadium; Ann Arbor, MI (rivalry)	ESPN Plus	W 56–14	110,231
October 25	3:30 p.m.	No. 10 Purdue	No. 13	Michigan Stadium; Ann Arbor, MI	ABC	W 31–3	111,349
November 1	12:00 p.m.	at No. 9 Michigan State	No. 11	Spartan Stadium; East Lansing, MI (rivalry)	ABC	W 27–20	75,129
November 15	3:30 p.m.	at Northwestern	No. 5	Ryan Field; Evanston, IL (rivalry)	ESPN	W 41–10	40,681
November 22	12:00 p.m.	No. 4 Ohio State	No. 5	Michigan Stadium; Ann Arbor, MI (The Game, College GameDay)	ABC	W 35–21	112,118
January 1, 2004	5:00 p.m.	vs. No. 1 USC*	No. 4	Rose Bowl; Pasadena, CA (Rose Bowl, College GameDay)	ABC	L 14–28	93,849
*Non-conference game; ^{†}Homecoming; Rankings from AP Poll released prior to the game; All times are in Eastern time

== Game summaries ==
=== Houston ===
For the third time in 12 seasons* Houston travelled to Ann Arbor for a game against Michigan. The Cougars had what was considered to be a unique offense that some analysts felt could possibly give the Michigan defense some problems. After a competitive 1st quarter, however, the Wolverines dominated the Cougars the rest of the way, winning the game in an epic beat-down, 50-3. * The other 2 games were played in Ann Arbor in 1992, and 1993. Michigan won both of them easily, 61-7, and 42-21 respectively (when you combine the scores of all 3 games, Michigan has outscored Houston, 143-31).

=== Notre Dame ===
Team	1	2	3	4	Total
Notre Dame	0	0	0	0	0
• Michigan	7	10	7	14	38

- Date: September 13
- Location: Michigan Stadium, Ann Arbor, MI
- Game start: 3:40 p.m. EST
- Elapsed time: 3:10
- Game attendance: 111,726
- Referee: Bill LeMonnier
- TV announcers (ABC): Brent Musburger (Play-by-play), Gary Danielson (Color) & Jack Arute (Sideline)

Scoring summary
1	6:25	MICH	Chris Perry 2-yard run (Adam Finley kick)	MICH 7–0
2	14:56	MICH	Adam Finley 24-yard field goal	MICH 10–0
2	9:00	MICH	Chris Perry 5-yard pass from John Navarre (Adam Finley kick)	MICH 17–0
3	12:35	MICH	Chris Perry 9-yard run (Adam Finley kick)	MICH 24–0
4	13:26	MICH	Chris Perry 1-yard run (Adam Finley kick)	MICH 31–0
4	4:24	MICH	Pierre Rembert 7-yard run (Garrett Rivas kick)	MICH 38–0

=== Minnesota ===
Team	1	2	3	4	Total
• Michigan	0	0	7	31	38
Minnesota	7	7	14	7	35

- Date: October 10
- Location: Hubert H. Humphrey Metrodome, Minneapolis, MN
- Game start: 8:05 p.m. EST
- Elapsed time: 3:30
- Game attendance: 62,374
- Game weather: Indoors
- Referee: Steve Pamon
- TV announcers (ESPN): Sean McDonough (Play-by-play), Rod Gilmore (Color), Mike Golic (Color) & Alex Flanagan (Sideline)

Scoring summary
1	6:14	MINN	Marion Barber III 20-yard run (Rhys Lloyd kick)	MINN 7–0
2	9:17	MINN	Laurence Maroney 8-yard run (Rhys Lloyd kick)	MINN 14–0
3	11:00	MICH	John Navarre 36-yard pass from Steve Breaston (Garrett Rivas kick)	MINN 14–7
3	8:04	MINN	Laurence Maroney 38-yard run (Rhys Lloyd kick)	MINN 21–7
3	0:58	MINN	Thomas Tapeh 2-yard run (Rhys Lloyd kick)	MINN 28–7
4	14:24	MICH	Chris Perry 10-yard pass from John Navarre (Garrett Rivas kick)	MINN 28–14
4	13:30	MICH	Jacob Stewart 30-yard interception return (Garrett Rivas kick)	MINN 28–21
4	11:11	MINN	Asad Abdul-Khaliq 52-yard run (Rhys Lloyd kick)	MINN 35–21
4	10:18	MICH	Braylon Edwards 52-yard pass from John Navarre (Garrett Rivas kick)	MINN 35–28
4	5:48	MICH	Chris Perry 10-yard run (Garrett Rivas kick)	Tied 35–35
4	0:47	MICH	Garrett Rivas 33-yard field goal	MICH 38–35

=== Purdue ===
Purdue Boilermakers at Michigan Wolverines

Quarter	1	2	3	4	Total
Purdue	0	0	3	0	3
Michigan	14	0	7	10	31

at Michigan Stadium • Ann Arbor, Michigan

- Date: October 25
- Game time: 3:30 p.m. EST
- Game weather: Cloudy • Mid 50s • Wind 10–15 W
- Game attendance: 111,349
- Referee: J. Lapetina
- TV announcers (ABC): Brent Musburger, Gary Danielson, and Jack Arute
- M Go Blue - Football

Game information

Purdue

- Kyle Orton
  18/37, 184 Yds, 2 INT
- Jerod Void
  13 Rush, 52 Yds
- Taylor Stubblefield
  5 Rec, 72 Yds

Michigan

- John Navarre
  17/30, 225 Yds, 2 TD
- Chris Perry
  28 Rush, 95 Yds
- Jason Avant
  5 Rec, 90 Yds

Scoring summary

Quarter	Time	Drive			Team	Scoring information	Score	
Quarter	Time	Plays	Yards	TOP	Team	Scoring information	PUR	MICH
1	7:03	8	65	4:34	Michigan	Edwards 14-yard touchdown reception from Navarre, Rivas kick good	0	7
1	0:00	5	49	1:28	Michigan	Breaston 21-yard touchdown run, Rivas kick good	0	14
3	9:46	9	47	3:40	Purdue	27-yard field goal by Jones	3	14
3	6:57	6	80	2:49	Michigan	Edwards 26-yard touchdown reception from Navarre, Rivas kick good	3	21
4	12:22				Michigan	Fumble recovery returned 2 yards for touchdown by Curry, Rivas kick good	3	28
4	5:48	10	61	4:15	Michigan	27-yard field goal by Rivas	3	31
"TOP" = time of possession. For other American football terms, see Glossary of American football.							3	31

=== Michigan State ===
Team	1	2	3	4	Total
• Michigan	0	13	7	7	27
Michigan State	0	3	7	10	20

- Date: November 1
- Location: Spartan Stadium, East Lansing, MI
- Game start: 12:09 p.m. EST
- Elapsed time: 3:16
- Game attendance: 75,129
- Referee: Dave Witvoet
- TV announcers (ABC): Brent Musburger (Play-by-play), Gary Danielson (Color) & Jack Arute (Sideline)

Scoring summary
2	12:31	MICH	Chris Perry 1-yard run (Garrett Rivas kick)	MICH 7–0
2	7:07	MSU	Dave Rayner 20-yard field goal	MICH 7–3
2	1:03	MICH	Braylon Edwards 40-yard pass from John Navarre (kick failed)	MICH 13–3
3	4:12	MICH	Andy Mignery 20-yard pass from John Navarre (Garrett Rivas kick)	MICH 21–3
3	3:58	MSU	Agim Shabaj 73-yard pass from Jeff Smoker (Dave Rayner kick)	MICH 20–10
4	13:31	MICH	Braylon Edwards 16-yard pass from John Navarre (Garrett Rivas kick)	MICH 27–10
4	10:32	MSU	Dave Rayner 32-yard field goal	MICH 27–13
4	6:03	MSU	Clifford Dukes 65-yard fumble return (Dave Rayner kick)	MICH 27–20

=== Ohio State ===
Ohio State Buckeyes (10–1) at Michigan Wolverines (9–2)

Quarter	1	2	3	4	Total
Ohio St	0	7	7	7	21
Michigan	7	14	7	7	35

at Michigan Stadium • Ann Arbor, Michigan

- Date: November 22
- Game time: 12:00 p.m. EDT
- Game weather: Mostly cloudy • low 50s • Wind 10–20 E/NE
- Game attendance: 112,118
- Referee: Jim Lapetina
- TV announcers (ABC): Keith Jackson, Dan Fouts, and Todd Harris
- Box Score

Game information

Ohio St

- Craig Krenzel
  20/33, 221 Yds, 2 TD
- Lydell Ross
  9 Rush, 22 Yds, TD
- Michael Jenkins
  9 Rec, 132 Yds

Michigan

- John Navarre
  21/32, 278 Yds, 2 TD, INT
- Chris Perry
  31 Rush, 154 Yds, 2 TD
- Braylon Edwards
  7 Rec, 130 Yds, 2 TD

100th meeting

Scoring summary

Quarter	Time	Drive			Team	Scoring information	Score	
Quarter	Time	Plays	Yards	TOP	Team	Scoring information	OSU	MICH
1	0:39	18	89	7:04	Michigan	Steve Breaston 1-yard touchdown run, Garrett Rivas kick good	0	7
2	13:33	3	74	0:47	Michigan	Braylon Edwards 64-yard touchdown reception from John Navarre, Rivas kick good	0	14
2	5:49	10	80	3:49	Michigan	Braylon Edwards 23-yard touchdown reception from John Navarre, Garrett Rivas kick good	0	21
2	0:44	12	81	5:05	Ohio St	Santonio Holmes 8-yard touchdown reception from Craig Krenzel, Mike Nugent kick good	7	21
3	13:04	5	62	1:56	Michigan	Chris Perry 30-yard touchdown run, Garrett Rivas kick good	7	28
3	6:55	4	43	1:03	Ohio St	Santonio Holmes 13-yard touchdown reception from Craig Krenzel, Mike Nugent kick good	14	28
4	13:53	11	93	2:59	Ohio St	Lydell Ross 2-yard touchdown run, Mike Nugent kick good	21	28
4	7:55	8	88	3:53	Michigan	Chris Perry 15-yard touchdown run, Garrett Rivas kick good	21	35
"TOP" = time of possession. For other American football terms, see Glossary of American football.							21	35

== Personnel ==
=== Coaching staff ===
- Head coach: Lloyd Carr
- Assistant coaches: Erik Campbell (assistant head coach), Mike DeBord, Ron English, Jim Herrmann, Fred Jackson, Scot Loeffler, Terry Malone, Andy Moeller, Bill Sheridan
- Trainer: Paul Schmidt
- Managers: Davon Wilson (senior manager), Bob Belke, Tom Bellen, Tom Burpee, Jeff Clancy, Brandon Greer, Brad Hoffman, Jeff Levine, Atif Lodhi, Chris Mancuso, Darin Ottaviani, Blake Postma, Brad Rosenwasser

=== Roster ===
2003 Michigan Wolverines football team roster
Players
Coaches
Offense

Pos.	#	Name	Class
WR	8	Jason Avant	So
OL	75	David Baas	Sr
WR	27	Calvin Bell	Sr
OL	71	Tom Berishaj	So
OL	54	Mark Bihl	So
OL, LS	61	Turner Booth	So
WR	15	Steve Breaston	So
RB	41	Tim Bracken	Sr
RB	6	Alijah Bradley	So
QB	7	Spencer Brinton	RSr
WR	9	Tyrece Butler	RSr
RB	9	Anton Campbell	Fr
OL	55	Andy Christopfel	Sr
TE	89	Tyler Ecker	So
WR	1	Braylon Edwards	Jr
TE	86	Jim Fisher	Sr
OL	64	Jeff Gaston	Sr
WR	18	Jermaine Gonzales	Sr
QB	12	Matt Gutierrez	So
OL	65	Leo Henige	Jr
RB	24	Jerome Jackson	Fr
QB	20	Mike Kaselitz	RSr
QB	13	Jeff Kastl	So
WR	22	Ross Kesler	Sr
OL	76	Mike Kolodziej	So
TE	83	Adam Kraus	Fr
WR	36	Brian Lafer	Sr
OL	67	Matt Lentz	Jr
OL	77	Jake Long	Fr
TE	82	Mike Mandich	Jr
TE	88	Tim Massaquoi	Jr
WR	80	Chris Matsos	Jr
TE, P	14	Andy Mignery	RSr
OL	62	Courtney Morgan	RSr
TE	84	Kevin Murphy	So
QB	16	John Navarre	RSr
OL	77	Tony Pape	RSr
OL	57	Dave Pearson	RSr
RB	23	Chris Perry	Sr
RB	20	Pierre Rembert	So
QB	10	Clayton Richard	Fr
OL	72	Rueben Riley	So
OL	69	David Schoonover	Jr
OL	68	Patrick Sharrow	Fr
OL	74	Demeterius Solomon	RSr
TE	85	Dave Spytek	Jr
OL	79	Adam Stenavich	Jr
WR	99	Andy Stejskal	Sr
TE	94	Matt Studenski	Jr
WR	17	Carl Tabb	So
FB	35	Brian Thompson	So
RB	5	David Underwood	Jr
QB	8	Matt Wilde	So

Defense

Pos.	#	Name	Class
DB	19	Willis Barringer	So
DL	63	Derek Bell	Jr
DL	91	Rondell Biggs	So
LB	15	Jonathan Borden	Sr
DL	60	Grant Bowman	RSr
S	6	Prescott Burgess	Fr
DB	26	Mike Carl	So
LB	2	Shawn Crable	Fr
CB	49	Brent Cummings	RSr
CB	30	Markus Curry	Jr
ILB	43	Carl Diggs	RSr
FB	32	Kevin Dudley	Sr
CB	31	Brandent Englemon	Fr
CB	29	Leon Hall	Fr
LB	45	David Harris	So
DL	96	Larry Harrison	So
DL	90	Norman Heuer	RSr
CB	4	Darnell Hood	So
DL	53	David Hull	Fr
CB	3	Marlin Jackson	Jr
LB	51	Jeff Jansen	Fr
DB	14	Tyrone Jordan	Fr
DL	95	Alain Kashama	Sr
ILB	37	Zach Kaufman	Sr
LB	34	Joe Leoni	So
CB	21	Jeremy LeSueur	RSr
LS	52	Ross Mann	Sr
OLB	58	Roy Manning	Sr
DL	94	Patrick Massey	Jr
LB	36	Scott McClintock	Jr
CB	27	Quinton McCoy	Fr
S	26	Ryan Mundy	Fr
DL	93	Alex Ofili	Jr
LB	40	Obi Oluigbo	So
DB	38	B.J. Opong-Owusu	So
DE	92	William Paul	Fr
LB	97	Max Pollock	Fr
LB	46	James Presley	Fr
LB	55	Jeremy Read	Sr
LB	42	Lawrence Reid	Jr
LB	59	Joey Sarantos	Jr
LB	66	Paul Sarantos	So
FS	22	Jon Shaw	RSr
DB	25	Ernest Shazor	Jr
DL	13	Larry Stevens	Sr
DB	28	Jacob Stewart	So
DE	50	Jeremy Van Alstyne	So
DL	78	Gabriel Watson	So
LB	56	LaMarr Woodley	Fr
DL	99	Pierre Woods	Jr
DB	33	Charles Young	Sr

Special teams

Pos.	#	Name	Class
PK	34	Philip Brabbs	RSr
P, PK	39	Adam Finley	Sr
PK	31	Craig Moore	So
PK	10	Troy Nienberg	RSr
PK	97	Luke Perl	Sr
PK	38	Garrett Rivas	Fr
P	3	Ross Ryan	So
P	2	Mark Spencer	So

Head coach

- Lloyd Carr

Coordinators/assistant coaches

Legend

- (C) Team captain
- (S) Suspended
- (I) Ineligible
- Injured
- Redshirt

Roster

== Statistical achievements ==
Chris Perry was the Big Ten rushing individual statistical champion (126.8 yards per conference games and 128.8 yards per game). Perry set numerous current school records during the season including single-game attempts (51, November 1, 2003) surpassing Ron Johnson's 1967 record of 42, and single-season attempts (338) surpassing Anthony Thomas' 2000 record of 319.

The team led the Big Ten in passing offense for all games (270.8 yards per game), although Michigan State won the title for conference games. They were also the Big Ten scoring statistical champions for conference games (35.8 points per game), although Minnesota was the champion for all games. They also ranked first in passing efficiency defense for both conference games (96.6) and all games (102.2). The team led the conference in total defense for conference games (286.1) and all games (316.4). The November 22 Michigan - Ohio State football rivalry game set the current conference single-game attendance record of 112,118.

Braylon Edwards posted four consecutive 100-yard reception games, surpassing Desmond Howard, Carter and Marcus Knight who all had three in various seasons. Edwards would tie this record the following season, but Mario Manningham posted six in 2007 to establish the current record. John Navarre set numerous career records: pass attempts (1366) extending his own record established the prior season; completions (765), surpassing Elvis Grbac's 1992 record of 522; passing yards (9254), surpassing Grbac's 6460. Chad Henne broke each of these records during his career ending in 2007. Navarre also broke his own single-season records for pass attempts (456), completions (270) and yards (3331) set the prior season. Navarre broke Tom Brady's single-game passing yards record of 375 with a 389-yard performance on October 4 against Iowa. These single-game and single-season records still stand. The final touchdown pass of his career gave him 72, one more than Grbac for another record to be broken by Henne. Navarre established the current records for single-season yards per game (256.2), surpassing his own record of the prior year, and career yards per game (215.2), surpassing Jim Harbaugh's 175.8. He broke his own single-season 200-yard game record with 10 bringing his record setting career total to 28.

== Awards and honors ==
The individuals in the sections below earned recognition for meritorious performances.

=== National ===
- All-Americans: Chris Perry
- Doak Walker Award: Perry
- Jim Brown Trophy: Perry

=== Conference ===
- Big Ten Football MVP: Chris Perry
- All-Conference: John Navarre, Chris Perry, Braylon Edwards, Tony Pape
- Big Ten Offensive Player of the Year: Perry
- Big Ten Freshman of the Year: Steve Breaston (coaches)

=== Team ===
- Co-captains: Grant Bowman, Carl Diggs, John Navarre
- Most Valuable Player: Chris Perry
- Meyer Morton Award: Braylon Edwards
- John Maulbetsch Award: Jake Long
- Frederick Matthei Award: Jason Avant
- Dick Katcher Award: Grant Bowman, Norman Heuer, Larry Stevens
- Arthur Robinson Scholarship Award: Andy Mingery
- Hugh Rader Jr. Award: David Baas, Tony Pape
- Robert P. Ufer Award: John Navarre
- Roger Zatkoff Award: Lawrence Reid
- Dick Katcher Award: Grant Bowman, Norman Heuer, Larry Stevens
