= 2003 Big Ten Conference football season =

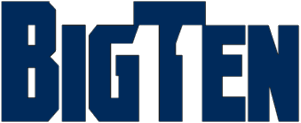
- League: NCAA Division I-A
- Sport: football
- Duration: August, 2003 through January, 2004
- Teams: 11
- TV partner(s): ABC, ESPN, ESPN2

2004 NFL Draft
- Top draft pick: Robert Gallery (Iowa)
- Picked by: Oakland Raiders, first round (2nd overall)

Regular Season
- Champions: Michigan
- Runners-up: Ohio State; Purdue
- Season MVP: Chris Perry (Michigan)

Football seasons
- ← 2002 2004 →

2003 Big Ten Conference football standings
	Conf.			Overall
Team	W		L	W		L
No. 6 Michigan $	7	–	1	10	–	3
No. 4 Ohio State %	6	–	2	11	–	2
No. 18 Purdue	6	–	2	9	–	4
No. 8 Iowa	5	–	3	10	–	3
No. 20 Minnesota	5	–	3	10	–	3
Michigan State	5	–	3	8	–	5
Wisconsin	4	–	4	7	–	6
Northwestern	4	–	4	6	–	7
Penn State	1	–	7	3	–	9
Indiana	1	–	7	2	–	10
Illinois	0	–	8	1	–	11
% – BCS at-large representative; $ – Conference champion; Rankings from AP Poll

The 2003 Big Ten Conference football season was the 108th season for the Big Ten Conference. Michigan won the conference, finishing ahead of Ohio State and Purdue.

== Bowl games ==
Date	Bowl Game	Big Ten Team	Opp. Team	Score
Dec. 26, 2003	Motor City Bowl	Northwestern	Bowling Green	28-24
Dec. 29, 2003	Alamo Bowl	Michigan State	Nebraska	17-3
Dec. 31, 2003	Music City Bowl	Wisconsin	Auburn	28-14
Dec. 31, 2003	Sun Bowl	Minnesota	Oregon	31-30
Jan. 1, 2004	Outback Bowl	Iowa	Florida	37-17
Jan. 1, 2004	Capital One Bowl	Purdue	Georgia	34-27 (OT)
Jan. 1, 2004	Rose Bowl	Michigan	USC	28-14
Jan. 2, 2004	Fiesta Bowl	Ohio State	Kansas State	35-28

== See also ==
- 2003 All-Big Ten Conference football team
