= 2003 Penn State Nittany Lions football team =

American college football season

2003 Penn State Nittany Lions football
- Conference: Big Ten Conference
- Record: 3-9 (1-7 Big Ten)
- Head coach: Joe Paterno (38th season)
- Offensive coordinator: Fran Ganter (20th season)
- Offensive scheme: Pro-style
- Defensive coordinator: Tom Bradley (4th season)
- Base defense: 4–3
- Home stadium: Beaver Stadium

2003 Big Ten Conference football standings
	Conf.			Overall
Team	W		L	W		L
No. 6 Michigan $	7	–	1	10	–	3
No. 4 Ohio State %	6	–	2	11	–	2
No. 18 Purdue	6	–	2	9	–	4
No. 8 Iowa	5	–	3	10	–	3
No. 20 Minnesota	5	–	3	10	–	3
Michigan State	5	–	3	8	–	5
Wisconsin	4	–	4	7	–	6
Northwestern	4	–	4	6	–	7
Penn State	1	–	7	3	–	9
Indiana	1	–	7	2	–	10
Illinois	0	–	8	1	–	11
% – BCS at-large representative; $ – Conference champion; Rankings from AP Poll

The 2003 Penn State Nittany Lions football team represented the Pennsylvania State University in the 2003 NCAA Division I-A football season. The team's head coach was Joe Paterno. It played its home games at Beaver Stadium in University Park, Pennsylvania.

== Preseason ==
The offense returns five starters, including quarterback Zack Mills, who was on pace for a record-shattering season before injuring his left throwing arm, and with the emergence of Larry Johnson, the Nittany Lions practically stopped throwing the ball. But in addition to losing Johnson, who won the Maxwell Award, the Doak Walker Award, the Walter Camp Award, and finished third in the Heisman Trophy balloting, the offensive unit also loses its leading receiver Bryant Johnson and four starters on the offensive line. Top candidates to replace Johnson include junior Mike Gasparato and true freshmen Austin Scott and Tony Hunt. Defensive tackle Levi Brown was moved to left tackle to help shore up the offensive line.

Penn State started the season ranked No. 25 in the Coaches college football preseason poll and was unranked in the AP college football preseason poll.

=== Recruiting class ===
College recruiting
Name	Hometown	School	Height	Weight	40^{‡}	Commit date
Terrell Golden; WR	Norfolk, Virginia	Lake Taylor HS	6 ft 4 in (1.93 m)	200 lb (91 kg)	4.60	Dec 17, 2002
Terrell Golden; WR	Recruit ratings: Scout: Rivals:					
Joel Holler; OL	Lancaster, Pennsylvania	McCaskey Hs-Lev II	6 ft 6 in (1.98 m)	335 lb (152 kg)	5.40	Dec 18, 2002
Joel Holler; OL	Recruit ratings: Scout: Rivals:					
Tony Hunt; RB	Alexandria, Virginia	T. C. Williams HS	6 ft 2 in (1.88 m)	222 lb (101 kg)	4.52	Feb 4, 2003
Tony Hunt; RB	Recruit ratings: Scout: Rivals:					
Jonathan Jackson; WR	Philadelphia, Pennsylvania	West Philadelphia Catholic HS	6 ft 1 in (1.85 m)	185 lb (84 kg)	4.45	Jan 24, 2003
Jonathan Jackson; WR	Recruit ratings: Scout: Rivals:					
Rodney Kinlaw; RB	Goose Creek, South Carolina	Stratford HS	5 ft 10 in (1.78 m)	185 lb (84 kg)	4.35	Jan 31, 2003
Rodney Kinlaw; RB	Recruit ratings: Scout: Rivals:					
Dan Mazan; OL	Carteret, New Jersey	Carteret HS	6 ft 4 in (1.93 m)	305 lb (138 kg)	4.90	Dec 3, 2002
Dan Mazan; OL	Recruit ratings: Scout: Rivals:					
Paul Posluszny; LB	Aliquippa, Pennsylvania	Hopewell SHS	6 ft 2 in (1.88 m)	210 lb (95 kg)	4.62	Aug 5, 2002
Paul Posluszny; LB	Recruit ratings: Scout: Rivals:					
Paolo Colacicco; DE/LB	Bronx, New York	Dewitt Clinton HS	6 ft 0 in (1.83 m)	266 lb (121 kg)	4.82	Feb 3, 2003
Paolo Colacicco; DE/LB	Recruit ratings: Scout: Rivals:					
Austin Scott; RB	Allentown, Pennsylvania	Parkland SHS	6 ft 1 in (1.85 m)	195 lb (88 kg)	4.40	Sep 11, 2002
Austin Scott; RB	Recruit ratings: Scout: Rivals:					
John Shaw; DT	Spring Grove, Pennsylvania	Spring Grove Area SHS	6 ft 4 in (1.93 m)	275 lb (125 kg)	4.87	Jul 1, 2002
John Shaw; DT	Recruit ratings: Scout: Rivals:					
Brent Wise; WR	Harrisburg, Pennsylvania	Central Dauphin SHS	6 ft 0 in (1.83 m)	190 lb (86 kg)	4.40	Jan 19, 2003
Brent Wise; WR	Recruit ratings: Scout: Rivals:					
Overall recruit ranking: Scout: 50 Rivals: 93
‡ Refers to 40-yard dash; Note: In many cases, Scout, Rivals, 247Sports, On3, and ESPN may conflict in their listings of height, weight and 40 time.; In these cases, the average was taken. ESPN grades are on a 100-point scale.; Sources: "Penn State Commit List for 2003". Rivals.; "Scout.com Football Recruiting: Penn State". Scout.; "Scout.com Team Recruiting Rankings". Scout.; "2003 Team Ranking". Rivals.com.

== Schedule ==
Date	Time	Opponent	Site	TV	Result	Attendance
August 30	3:30 p.m.	Temple*	Beaver Stadium; University Park, PA	ESPN Plus	W 23–10	101,553
September 6	12:00 p.m.	Boston College*	Beaver Stadium; University Park, PA	ABC	L 14–27	106,445
September 13	8:00 p.m.	at No. 18 Nebraska*	Memorial Stadium; Lincoln, NE	ABC	L 10–18	78,008
September 20	1:00 p.m.	Kent State*	Beaver Stadium; University Park, PA	ESPN.com	W 32–10	102,078
September 27	12:00 p.m.	No. 24 Minnesota	Beaver Stadium; University Park, PA (Governor's Victory Bell)	ESPN	L 14–20	106,735
October 4	12:00 p.m.	Wisconsin^{†}	Beaver Stadium; University Park, PA	ESPN Plus	L 23–30	107,851
October 11	3:30 p.m.	at No. 18 Purdue	Ross–Ade Stadium; West Lafayette, IN	ABC	L 14–28	59,720
October 25	12:00 p.m.	at No. 16 Iowa	Kinnick Stadium; Iowa City, IA	ABC	L 14–26	70,397
November 1	3:30 p.m.	No. 8 Ohio State	Beaver Stadium; University Park, PA (rivalry)	ABC	L 20–21	108,276
November 8	12:00 p.m.	at Northwestern	Ryan Field; Evanston, IL	ESPN2	L 7–17	26,188
November 15	12:00 p.m.	Indiana	Beaver Stadium; University Park, PA	ESPN Plus	W 52–7	106,465
November 22	12:00 p.m.	at Michigan State	Spartan Stadium; East Lansing, MI (rivalry)	ESPN	L 10–41	72,119
*Non-conference game; ^{†}Homecoming; Rankings from AP Poll released prior to the game; All times are in Eastern time

== Roster ==
2003 Penn State Nittany Lions football team roster
Players
Coaches
Offense

Pos.	#	Name	Class
WR	1	Terrell Golden	Fr
QB	3	Chris Ganter	So
WR	6	Donnie Johnson	Fr
QB	7	Zack Mills	Jr
RB	8	Rodney Kinlaw	Fr
WR	9	Terrance Phillips	So
WR	11	Tony Johnson	Sr
QB	12	Michael Robinson	So
WR	13	Kinta Palmer	So
QB	14	Andy Kubic	Fr
WR	15	Mike Baird	So
WR	15	Brent Wise	Fr
WR	16	Dan Corrado	Fr
QB	19	Tom Lundquist	So
WR	19	Gerald Smith	Jr
RB	22	Austin Scott	Fr
RB	23	Aric Heffelfinger	Fr
RB	24	Tony Hunt	Fr
WR	26	Josh Hannum	Fr
RB	28	Chris Wilson	Fr
FB	30	BranDon Snow	Fr
WR	31	Ernie Terrell	So
RB	32	Mike Gasparato	Jr
TE	33	Mike Lukac	Sr
FB	36	Brian Fairchild	So
FB	42	Sean McHugh	Sr
RB	42	Ricky Upton	Sr
FB	45	Adam Senk	So
OL	52	Blase Iorio	Fr
G	53	Steve Roach	Fr
G	54	Scott Davis	Jr
OL	57	Nick Albano	Fr
G	59	Charles Rush	So
OL	60	Patick Weber	Fr
C	61	David Costlow	Sr
OL	62	Nick Daise	Fr
OL	63	Dan Mazan	Fr
OL	64	Chad Albright	Fr
G	65	Robert Price	Fr
C	66	Lance Antolick	So
OT	67	Levi Brown	Fr
OT	68	John Wilson	So
C	70	Nick Marmo	Jr
G	71	Mark Farris	Fr
OT	72	Lee Lispi	Fr
OL	73	Joel Holler	Fr
G	74	Tyler Reed	So
OT	75	Chris McKelvy	Sr
OT	76	Damone Jones	Sr
OT	79	Chris Auletta	Fr
WR	80	Scott Shirley	Sr
TE	81	Isaac Smolko	So
WR	81	Jason Stryker	Jr
WR	82	Vic Surma	Fr
WR	83	Ryan Scott	Jr
WR	84	Jamal Huff	So
WR	84	Brandan Perretta	Fr
TE	88	Matt Kranchick	Sr
TE	89	Andrew Richardson	So
TE	93	Casey Williams	Sr
TE	98	Mike Pawlikowski	Jr

Defense

Pos.	#	Name	Class
CB	1	Anwar Phillips	So
LB	2	Deryck Toles	Sr
DB	4	Jason Ganter	Fr
CB	5	Maurice Humphrey	Fr
S	10	Calvin Lowry	So
LB	13	Kevin Darling	Fr
S	14	Jim Kanuch	Fr
S	15	Yaacov Yisrael	Sr
LB	16	Andy Ryland	Sr
DE	17	Lavon Chisley	So
S	18	Andrew Guman	Jr
DB	20	Marcus Mills	So
LB	20	Tim Shaw	So
CB	21	Alan Zemaitis	So
CB	22	Darien Hardy	Fr
DB	23	Matt Fontana	Fr
CB	24	Nolan McCready	Fr
CB	25	Rich Gardner	Sr
S	26	Vince Gliatta	Fr
S	27	Chris Harrell	Jr
S	29	Paul Cronin	So
CB	34	Gio Vendemia	So
DB	35	John Royse	So
LB	35	J.R. Zwierzynski	Fr
LB	38	Jimi Mitchell	Jr
LB	39	Paul Posluszny	Fr
LB	40	T.C. Cosby	Jr
DT	41	Scott Paxson	So
DB	43	Adam Taliaferro	Sr
LB	45	Pat Bedics	Fr
DB	46	Curt Reese	So
LB	47	Gino Capone	Sr
LB	48	Matt Pavelic	Fr
LB	49	Dorian Burton	So
DL	50	Jamel Felder	Fr
LB	51	Tim Johnson	Jr
DE	54	Amani Purcell	Fr
DE	55	Matthew Rice	So
DE/LB	56	Paolo Colacicco	Fr
DL	67	Richard Cheek	Fr
DT	69	Jason Robinson	Jr
DT	75	Lee Kuzemchak	Fr
DT	85	Jay Alford	Fr
DE	86	Jeremiah Davis	Jr
DE	87	John Bronson	Jr
DT	91	Tamba Hali	So
DT	92	Ed Johnson	Fr
LB	94	Derek Wake (C)	Jr
DL	95	Mike Sothern	Fr
DE	96	Patrick Hall	Fr
DE	97	Greg Bauer	So
DT	98	John Shaw	Fr
LB	99	Sam Ruhe	Jr

Special teams

Pos.	#	Name	Class
K	4	Robbie Gould	Jr
P	36	Jeremy Kapinos	Fr
K	48	Nate Weltman	Fr
P	49	Brandon Ream	Fr
K	95	David Kimball	Sr

Head coach

- Joe Paterno

Coordinators/assistant coaches

Legend

- (C) Team captain
- (S) Suspended
- (I) Ineligible
- Injured
- Redshirt

Roster
Last update: October 29, 2003

== Game summaries ==
=== Temple ===
	1	2	3	4	Total
Temple	0	3	0	7	10
Penn State	0	7	6	10	23

Penn State played four tailbacks to beat the Owls 23–10. Zack Mills was 7 of 16 for 79 yards and a touchdown. Backup quarterback Michael Robinson, who started at tailback, led the team with 84 yards rushing. True freshman Austin Scott was next with 69 yards on a team-high 12 carries. Fifth-year senior Ricky Upton had 19 yards on four carries, and true freshman Tony Hunt had 12 yards on three carries. This would be the only game of 2003 in which Penn State never once trailed.

=== Boston College ===
	1	2	3	4	Total
Boston College	21	3	3	0	27
Penn State	0	7	0	7	14

The Boston College Eagles jumped out to an early lead against a flat Penn State team, as the Eagles won 27–14. The Eagles went up 21–0 with 7:50 left in the first quarter, amassing 206 of its 383 total yards by the end of the first quarter. Zack Mills was 15 of 28 for 144 yards but was benched in favor of Michael Robinson in the third quarter. Robinson led the Lions to a touchdown but going only 4 of 11 for 41 yards. Penn State was inside the Boston College 30 five times and came away with only 14 points.

=== Nebraska ===
	1	2	3	4	Total
Penn State	0	10	0	0	10
Nebraska	3	6	6	3	18

The Cornhuskers running game dominated Penn State, as the Huskers won 18–10. Nebraska rushed for 337 yards on 72 carries and held the ball twice as long as Penn State, who managed only 44 yards on 21 carries.

=== Kent State ===
	1	2	3	4	Total
Kent State	10	0	0	0	10
Penn State	7	10	12	3	32

Austin Scott made his first career start as Penn State erased a 10-point deficit to beat the Golden Flashes 32–10. Scott rushed for 100 yards on 21 carries with three touchdowns. Fullback Sean McHugh added 49 yards on nine carries and a touchdown. Redshirt freshman cornerback Maurice Humphrey made his first appearance at receiver and produced three receptions for 37 yards. Michael Robinson was used strictly as a quarterback, finishing 2 of 9 for 29 yards, alternating with Zack Mills who finished 10 of 20 for 99 yards.

=== Minnesota ===
	1	2	3	4	Total
Minnesota	14	3	0	3	20
Penn State	0	14	0	0	14

Michael Robinson got his first significant playing time under center, in relief of an injured Zack Mills whose left knee was sprained in the second quarter and did not return, but it wasn't enough to beat the Golden Gophers as the Lions lost 20–14. Robinson finished 16 of 27 for 178 yards but with two interceptions. He also had 42 yards rushing on 12 carries and a touchdown.

=== Wisconsin ===
	1	2	3	4	Total
Wisconsin	7	10	6	7	30
Penn State	3	6	7	7	23

Penn State's special teams broke down as the Badgers won 30–23. The Lions special teams allowed a punt returned for a touchdown, fumbled a punt that led to another touchdown, had two missed field goals and a missed extra point. The defense couldn't stop Wisconsin's running game, allowing 234 yards on the ground, 119 from Wisconsin's third-stringer Booker Stanley. Overshadowed was Michael Robinson's superb performance in his first start at quarterback. Robinson finished 22 of 43 for 379 yards, two touchdowns and no interceptions. His 379 passing yards ranked second on Penn State's all-time list at the time.

=== Purdue ===
	1	2	3	4	Total
Penn State	0	14	0	0	14
Purdue	7	10	3	8	28

The Boilermakers defense held the Penn State offense to only 204 total yards as Purdue won 28–14. Michael Robinson, starting at quarterback for the second straight week, was held to only 98 yards passing on 10 of 32 attempts. Purdue, known mostly as a passing team, rushed for 234 yards, compared to Penn State's 125 yards rushing. Tony Hunt led the team with 47 yards on nine carries.

=== Iowa ===
	1	2	3	4	Total
Penn State	7	0	7	0	14
Iowa	0	12	14	0	26

The Hawkeyes defense dominated the Penn State offense as Iowa goes on to win 26–14. The Lions led after the first quarter when safety Yaacov Yisrael returned an interception 83 yards for a touchdown. Penn State and starting quarterback Michael Robinson started their first three possessions in Iowa territory but couldn't move the ball and had a fumble returned that set up Iowa's first touchdown. Robinson was replaced by Zack Mills, who went 14 of 25 for 138 yards and a touchdown in the final three quarters, but the team failed to mount a serious comeback.

=== Ohio State ===
	1	2	3	4	Total
Ohio State	7	0	7	7	21
Penn State	7	10	0	3	20

Zack Mills regained the starting position, but it wasn't enough as the Buckeyes defeated the Lions 21–20. Mills was 27 of 43 for 253 yards, becoming the school's all-time leader in completions with 406, passing Tony Sacca. He also moved past Todd Blackledge into fourth place in passing yards with 4,973. Mills also moved into second place in total offense with 5,482 yards. Converted cornerback Maurice Humphrey had seven receptions for 64 yards, and little-used Terrance Phillips had his first career reception and finished with two catches for 47 yards. On defense, Alan Zemaitis returned an interception 78 yards for a touchdown. Kickoff specialist David Kimball made the first field goal of his career, replacing Robbie Gould in all kicking roles.

=== Northwestern ===
	1	2	3	4	Total
Penn State	0	7	0	0	7
Northwestern	0	0	0	17	17

The Nittany Lions, in control most of the game, couldn't hold off the Wildcats as the Wildcats scored 17 points in the final seven minutes to win 17–7. Zack Mills finished 22 of 36 for 230 yards passing and an interception but also rushed for Penn State's lone score. Maurice Humphrey led Penn State with eight receptions for 97 yards but dropped two passes including one that would have been a touchdown. Michael Robinson started at tailback and finished with 15 rushes for 47 yards, five receptions for 55 yards, and was 1 for 1 for 11 yards passing. Fullback Sean McHugh led the team in rushing with 79 yards on 10 carries.

The defense forced three Wildcat turnovers. Paul Posluszny made eight tackles, including one for a loss and a crucial stop on fourth-and-1. Yaacov Yisrael led the Lions with 15 tackles forced a fumble.

=== Indiana ===
	1	2	3	4	Total
Indiana	7	0	0	0	7
Penn State	14	7	31	0	52

On senior day Penn State scored on offense, defense, and special teams, as they rolled over the Hoosiers 52–7. After the Hoosiers jumped to a 7–0 lead, Penn State piled on 52 unanswered points. Zack Mills was 12 of 19 for 173 yards, three touchdowns and no interceptions. Michael Robinson started at tailback and rushed for 85 yards and a touchdown. Robinson was also 2 of 3 passing for 87 yards and a touchdown. Senior Tony Johnson had three receptions, all for touchdowns, totaling 47 yards.

On special teams, Robbie Gould kicked a 37-yard field goal. Yaacov Yisrael also blocked a punt, that Andrew Guman recovered and returned seven yards for a touchdown. Linebacker Paul Posluszny also returned an interception 15 yards for a touchdown.

=== Michigan State ===
	1	2	3	4	Total
Penn State	3	0	0	7	10
Michigan State	7	14	7	13	41

Robbie Gould gave the Lions a 3–0 lead, but it was all Michigan State Spartans after that en route to a 41–10 victory over the Nittany Lions. The Lions defense could not stop the Spartans, as Michigan State quarterback Jeff Smoker completed 29 of 50 for 357 yards and four touchdowns. Zack Mills finished 11 of 24 for 114 yards, becoming Penn State's career leader in total offense and also moved into second place on the school's passing yardage list.

== Awards ==
=== Watchlists ===
- Gino Capone
  Dick Butkus Award watchlist
- Robbie Gould
  Lou Groza Award watchlist
- Zack Mills
  Davey O'Brien Award watchlist
- Derek Wake
  Dick Butkus Award watchlist

=== Players ===
- Dave Costlow
  Second-team CoSIDA Academic All-American
  First-team CoSIDA Academic All-District
- Gino Capone
  First-team CoSIDA Academic All-District
- Michael Robinson
  Second-team CoSIDA Academic All-District
- Gio Vendemia
  Second-team CoSIDA Academic All-District
- Yaacov Yisrael
  Second-team All-Big Ten (conference coaches selection)
- Alan Zemaitis
  Second-team All-Big Ten (conference media selection)

== Postseason ==
Penn State finished the season with a 3–9 record, 1–7 in the Big Ten, Paterno's worst ever at Penn State. It was the third losing season in the past four, and only Paterno's fourth losing season since joining the coaching staff in 1950. Nine losses were the most ever for a Penn State team, breaking the record set by the 1931 2–8 team. The season ended without any wins in road games, which hadn't occurred since 1936.

Despite the losing record, Penn State claimed second place in football attendance for the third consecutive season, averaging 105,629 through seven home games, ranking in the top four for the 13th consecutive year. The Ohio State game drew Penn State's largest home crowd of 108,276, the seventh largest crowd ever in Beaver Stadium.

The team's second-leading receiver Maurice Humphrey, after a promising season at wide receiver was expelled from school and convicted of three counts of simple assault. Humphrey would not play another down for Penn State.

=== NFL draft ===
Four Nittany Lions were drafted in the 2004 NFL draft.

Round	Pick	Overall	Name	Position	Team
3rd	29	92	Rich Gardner	Cornerback	Tennessee Titans
6th	29	194	Matt Kranchick	Tight end	Pittsburgh Steelers
7th	28	229	David Kimball	Placekicker	Indianapolis Colts
7th	40	241	Sean McHugh	Tight end	Tennessee Titans

=== All-star games ===
Game	Date	Site	Players
65th Blue–Gray Football Classic	December 25, 2003	Veterans Stadium, Troy, Alabama	Tony Johnson, Matt Kranchick, Chris McKelvy, Deryck Toles
58th Hula Bowl	January 17, 2004	War Memorial Stadium, Wailuku, Hawaii	Gino Capone, Yaacov Yisrael
1st Las Vegas All-American Classic	January 17, 2004	Sam Boyd Stadium, Las Vegas, Nevada	Dave Costlow, Sean McHugh
55th Senior Bowl	January 24, 2004	Ladd–Peebles Stadium, Mobile, Alabama	Rich Gardner
6th Gridiron Classic	January 31, 2004	The Villages Polo Stadium, The Villages, Florida	Deryck Toles

== See also ==
- Uplifting Athletes
