= 2003 Northwestern Wildcats football team =

American college football season

2003 Northwestern Wildcats football

Motor City Bowl, L 24–28 vs. Bowling Green
- Conference: Big Ten Conference
- Record: 6–7 (4–4 Big Ten)
- Head coach: Randy Walker (5th season)
- Offensive coordinator: Mike Dunbar (2nd season)
- Offensive scheme: Spread
- Defensive coordinator: Greg Colby (2nd season)
- Base defense: 4–3
- Captains: Louis Ayeni; Pat Durr; Torri Stuckey; Jason Wright
- Home stadium: Ryan Field

2003 Big Ten Conference football standings
| | Conf. | | | Overall |
| Team | W | | L | W | | L |
|---|---|---|---|---|---|---|
| No. 6 Michigan $ | 7 | – | 1 | 10 | – | 3 |
| No. 4 Ohio State % | 6 | – | 2 | 11 | – | 2 |
| No. 18 Purdue | 6 | – | 2 | 9 | – | 4 |
| No. 8 Iowa | 5 | – | 3 | 10 | – | 3 |
| No. 20 Minnesota | 5 | – | 3 | 10 | – | 3 |
| Michigan State | 5 | – | 3 | 8 | – | 5 |
| Wisconsin | 4 | – | 4 | 7 | – | 6 |
| Northwestern | 4 | – | 4 | 6 | – | 7 |
| Penn State | 1 | – | 7 | 3 | – | 9 |
| Indiana | 1 | – | 7 | 2 | – | 10 |
| Illinois | 0 | – | 8 | 1 | – | 11 |
% – BCS at-large representative; $ – Conference champion; Rankings from AP Poll

The 2003 Northwestern Wildcats football team represented Northwestern University during the 2003 NCAA Division I-A football season. They played their home games at Ryan Field and participated as members of the Big Ten Conference. They were coached by Randy Walker.

== Schedule ==
| Date | Time | Opponent | Site | TV | Result | Attendance |
|---|---|---|---|---|---|---|
| August 30 | 6:00 pm | at Kansas* | Memorial Stadium; Lawrence, KS | | W 28–20 | 27,775 |
| September 6 | 12:00 pm | Air Force* | Ryan Field; Evanston, IL | | L 21–22 | 21,772 |
| September 13 | 11:00 am | Miami (Ohio)* | Ryan Field; Evanston, IL | ESPN+ | L 14–44 | 24,215 |
| September 20 | 1:00 pm | at Duke* | Wallace Wade Stadium; Durham, NC | | W 28–10 | 21,143 |
| September 27 | 11:00 pm | at No. 4 Ohio State | Ohio Stadium; Columbus, OH | ESPN2 | L 0–20 | 104,680 |
| October 4 | 11:00 am | No. 21 Minnesota | Ryan Field; Evanston, IL | ESPN+ | L 17–42 | 23,539 |
| October 11 | 10:00 am | at Indiana | Memorial Stadium; Bloomington, IN | ESPN+ | W 37–31 ^{OT} | 27,213 |
| October 25 | 11:00 am | No. 20 Wisconsin | Ryan Field; Evanston, IL | ESPN2 | W 16–7 | 36,233 |
| November 1 | 11:00 am | at No. 11 Purdue | Ross–Ade Stadium; West Lafayette, IN | ESPN | L 14–34 | 51,110 |
| November 8 | 11:00 am | Penn State | Ryan Field; Evanston, IL | ESPN2 | W 17–7 | 26,188 |
| November 15 | 2:30 pm | No. 9 Michigan | Ryan Field; Evanston, IL (rivalry) | ESPN | L 10–41 | 40,681 |
| November 22 | 11:00 am | at Illinois | Memorial Stadium; Champaign, IL (Sweet Sioux Tomahawk) | ESPN+ | W 37–20 | 38,688 |
| December 26 | 4:00 pm | vs. No. 24 Bowling Green* | Ford Field; Detroit, MI (Motor City Bowl) | ESPN | L 24–28 | 51,286 |
*Non-conference game; Rankings from BCS Poll or AP Poll if BCS not available; All times are in Central time

== Roster ==
2003 Northwestern Wildcats football team roster
Players
Coaches
Offense

| Pos. | # | Name | Class |
|---|---|---|---|
| QB | 14 | Brett Basanez | So |
| TE | 7 | Ray Bogenrief | Sr |
| OT | 76 | Trai Essex | Jr |
| RB | 33 | Noah Herron | Jr |
| OL | 61 | Greg Lutzen | So |
| OT | 60 | Ikechuku Ndukwe | Jr |
| G | 63 | Zach Strief | So |
| G | 64 | Matt Ulrich | Jr |
| C | 50 | Trevor Rees | Fr |
| QB | 16 | Alexander Webb | Fr |
| RB | 18 | Jason Wright (C) | Sr |

Defense

| Pos. | # | Name | Class |
|---|---|---|---|
| DT | 94 | Luis Castillo | Jr |
| DT | 97 | Colby Clark | Jr |
| DT | 67 | Barry Cofield | So |
| CB | 20 | Marquice Cole | So |
| LB | 3 | Pat Durr (C) | Sr |
| LB | 41 | Tim McGarigle | So |
| LB | 38 | Nick Roach | Fr |
| LB | 46 | Eric VanderHorst | So |
| CB | 31 | Marvin Ward | Jr |

Special teams

| Pos. | # | Name | Class |

Head coach

- Randy Walker

Coordinators/assistant coaches

- Pat Fitzgerald – Linebackers

Legend

- (C) Team captain
- (S) Suspended
- (I) Ineligible
- Injured
- Redshirt

Roster
Last update: 2003-12-18
