= 2003 Indiana Hoosiers football team =

American college football season

2003 Indiana Hoosiers football
- Conference: Big Ten Conference
- Record: 2–10 (1–7 Big Ten)
- Head coach: Gerry DiNardo (2nd season)
- Offensive coordinator: Al Borges (2nd season)
- Defensive coordinator: Tim Kish (2nd season)
- MVP: Joe Gonzalez
- Captains: Brian Lewis; Joe Gonzalez
- Home stadium: Memorial Stadium

2003 Big Ten Conference football standings
	Conf.			Overall
Team	W		L	W		L
No. 6 Michigan $	7	–	1	10	–	3
No. 4 Ohio State %	6	–	2	11	–	2
No. 18 Purdue	6	–	2	9	–	4
No. 8 Iowa	5	–	3	10	–	3
No. 20 Minnesota	5	–	3	10	–	3
Michigan State	5	–	3	8	–	5
Wisconsin	4	–	4	7	–	6
Northwestern	4	–	4	6	–	7
Penn State	1	–	7	3	–	9
Indiana	1	–	7	2	–	10
Illinois	0	–	8	1	–	11
% – BCS at-large representative; $ – Conference champion; Rankings from AP Poll

The 2003 Indiana Hoosiers football team represented Indiana University Bloomington during the 2003 NCAA Division I-A football season. They participated as members of the Big Ten Conference. The Hoosiers played their home games at Memorial Stadium in Bloomington, Indiana. The team was coached by Gerry DiNardo in his second year as head coach.

== Schedule ==
Date	Time	Opponent	Site	TV	Result	Attendance
August 30	11:00 am	at Connecticut*	Rentschler Field; East Hartford, CT		L 10–34	38,109
September 6	3:00 pm	at No. 22 Washington*	Husky Stadium; Seattle, WA	FSN	L 14–38	71,125
September 13	6:00 pm	Indiana State*	Memorial Stadium; Bloomington, IN		W 33–3	31,112
September 20	4:00 pm	Kentucky*	Memorial Stadium; Bloomington, IN (rivalry)		L 17–34	34,829
September 27	12:00 pm	at No. 11 Michigan	Michigan Stadium; Ann Arbor, MI	ESPN Plus	L 17–31	110,788
October 4	12:00 pm	at No. 25 Michigan State	Spartan Stadium; East Lansing, MI (rivalry)	ESPN Plus	L 3–31	72,398
October 11	12:00 pm	Northwestern^{†}	Memorial Stadium; Bloomington, IN	ESPN Plus	L 31–37 ^{OT}	27,213
October 25	12:00 pm	No. 8 Ohio State	Memorial Stadium; Bloomington, IN	ESPN	L 6–35	51,240
November 1	1:00 pm	at No. 24 Minnesota	Hubert H. Humphrey Metrodome; Minneapolis, MN		L 7–55	45,398
November 8	12:00 pm	Illinois	Memorial Stadium; Bloomington, IN (rivalry)	ESPN Plus	W 17–14	24,102
November 15	12:00 pm	at Penn State	Beaver Stadium; University Park, PA	ESPN Plus	L 7–52	106,465
November 22	12:00 pm	No. 16 Purdue	Memorial Stadium; Bloomington, IN (Old Oaken Bucket)	ESPN Plus	L 16–24	41,404
*Non-conference game; ^{†}Homecoming; Rankings from AP Poll released prior to the game; All times are in Eastern time

== Roster ==
2003 Indiana Hoosiers football team roster
Players
Coaches
Offense

Pos.	#	Name	Class
TE	87	Aaron Halterman	Jr
QB	10	Matt LoVecchio	Jr
WR	19	Courtney Roby	Jr
OL	76	Issac Sowells	So
RB	30	Chris Taylor	So

Defense

Pos.	#	Name	Class
S	8	Buster Larkins	So

Special teams

Pos.	#	Name	Class

Head coach

- Gerry DiNardo

Coordinators/assistant coaches

Legend

- (C) Team captain
- (S) Suspended
- (I) Ineligible
- Injured
- Redshirt
