= 2003 Michigan State Spartans football team =

American college football season

2003 Michigan State Spartans football

Alamo Bowl, L 3–17 vs. Nebraska
- Conference: Big Ten Conference
- Record: 8–5 (5–3 Big Ten)
- Head coach: John L. Smith (1st season)
- Offensive coordinator: Dave Baldwin (1st season)
- Offensive scheme: Spread
- Defensive coordinator: Chris Smeland (1st season)
- Base defense: 4–3
- Home stadium: Spartan Stadium

2003 Big Ten Conference football standings
	Conf.			Overall
Team	W		L	W		L
No. 6 Michigan $	7	–	1	10	–	3
No. 4 Ohio State %	6	–	2	11	–	2
No. 18 Purdue	6	–	2	9	–	4
No. 8 Iowa	5	–	3	10	–	3
No. 20 Minnesota	5	–	3	10	–	3
Michigan State	5	–	3	8	–	5
Wisconsin	4	–	4	7	–	6
Northwestern	4	–	4	6	–	7
Penn State	1	–	7	3	–	9
Indiana	1	–	7	2	–	10
Illinois	0	–	8	1	–	11
% – BCS at-large representative; $ – Conference champion; Rankings from AP Poll

The 2003 Michigan State Spartans football team represented Michigan State University in the 2003 NCAA Division I-A football season. The Spartans play their home games at Spartan Stadium in East Lansing, Michigan. This was the first year for head coach John L. Smith, who would win Big Ten coach of the year in his debut, but would later be fired after the 2006 season.

The Spartans were coming off a 4–8 season and had just let go of head coach Bobby Williams.

== Schedule ==
Date	Time	Opponent	Rank	Site	TV	Result	Attendance
August 30	3:40 p.m.	Western Michigan*		Spartan Stadium; East Lansing, MI	ESPN Plus	W 26–21	72,923
September 6	3:40 p.m.	Rutgers*		Spartan Stadium; East Lansing, MI	ESPN Plus	W 44–28	72,579
September 13	12:10 p.m.	Louisiana Tech*		Spartan Stadium; East Lansing, MI	ESPN Plus	L 19–20	72,387
September 20	2:30 p.m.	at Notre Dame*		Notre Dame Stadium; Notre Dame, IN (rivalry)	NBC	W 22–16	80,795
September 27	12:10 p.m.	No. 13 Iowa		Spartan Stadium; East Lansing, MI	ESPN Plus	W 20–10	72,276
October 4	12:10 p.m.	Indiana^{†}	No. 25	Spartan Stadium; East Lansing, MI (rivalry)	ESPN Plus	W 31–3	72,398
October 11	12:00 p.m.	at Illinois	No. 21	Memorial Stadium; Champaign, IL	ESPN2	W 49–14	47,509
October 18	12:00 p.m.	at No. 25 Minnesota	No. 15	Hubert H. Humphrey Metrodome; Minneapolis, MN	ESPN2	W 44–38	38,778
November 1	12:00 p.m.	No. 11 Michigan	No. 9	Spartan Stadium; East Lansing, MI (rivalry)	ABC	L 20–27	75,129
November 8	12:00 p.m.	at No. 7 Ohio State	No. 14	Ohio Stadium; Columbus, OH	ABC	L 23–33	105,194
November 15	12:00 p.m.	at Wisconsin	No. 21	Camp Randall Stadium; Madison, WI	ESPN2	L 21–56	79,256
November 22	12:00 p.m.	Penn State		Spartan Stadium; East Lansing, MI (rivalry)	ESPN	W 41–10	72,119
December 29	9:05 p.m.	vs. No. 22 Nebraska*		Alamodome; San Antonio, TX (Alamo Bowl)	ESPN	L 3–17	56,226
*Non-conference game; ^{†}Homecoming; Rankings from AP Poll released prior to the game; All times are in Eastern time

== Rankings ==
Ranking movements Legend: ██ Increase in ranking ██ Decrease in ranking — = Not ranked RV = Received votes
	Week																
Poll	Pre	1	2	3	4	5	6	7	8	9	10	11	12	13	14	15	Final
AP	—	—	RV	—	RV	25	21	15	11	9	14	21	RV	RV	RV	RV	RV
Coaches	—	—	RV	—	RV	RV	23	18	12	10	15	22	RV	RV	RV	RV	RV
BCS	Not released								13	10	20	24	—	—	—	—	Not released

== Roster ==
2003 Michigan State Spartans football team roster
Players
Coaches
Offense

Pos.	#	Name	Class
WR	19	Irving Campbell	Fr
OT	75	Pete Clifford	Fr
RB	21	DeAndra' Cobb	Jr
C	69	Kyle Cook	Fr
C	51	Chris Morris	So
QB	11	Stephen Reaves	Fr
QB	5	Drew Stanton	Fr
QB	9	Jeff Smoker	Sr
WR	6	Matt Trannon	So
G	76	Will Whitticker	Jr

Defense

Pos.	#	Name	Class
DT	95	Matthias Askew	Jr
CB	22	Darren Barnett	So
LB	30	Jehuu Caulcrick	Fr
DE	59	Clifford Dukes	Jr
LB	41	David Herron	Fr
LB	42	Mike Labinjo	Sr
DT	99	Brandon McKinney	Jr
LB	48	Seth Mitchell	So
DE	88	Luc Mullinder	Sr
DE	52	Clifton Ryan	Fr
DB	36	Eric Smith	So
LB	44	Ronald Stanley	Jr
DT	91	Kevin Vickerson	Jr

Special teams

Pos.	#	Name	Class
P	8	Brandon Fields	Fr
K	16	Dave Rayner	Jr

Head coach

- John L. Smith

Coordinators/assistant coaches

Legend

- (C) Team captain
- (S) Suspended
- (I) Ineligible
- Injured
- Redshirt

Roster

== Coaching staff ==
- John L. Smith – Head Coach
- Jim McElwain – Assistant head coach/wide receivers coach/Special Teams coordinator
- Dave Baldwin – Offensive coordinator/Tight end coach
- Doug Nussmeier – Quarterbacks coach
- Reggie Mitchell – Running backs coach/recruiting coordinator
- Jeff Stoutland – Offensive line coach
- Chris Smeland – Defensive coordinator/safeties coach
- Steve Stripling – Defensive line coach
- Mike Cox – Linebackers coach
- Paul Haynes – Defensive backs coach
- Robert Saleh – Graduate Assistant

== 2004 NFL draft ==
The following players were selected in the 2004 NFL draft.

Player	Round	Pick	Position	NFL team
Matthias Askew	4	114	Defensive Tackle	Cincinnati Bengals
Jeff Smoker	6	201	Quarterback	St. Louis Rams
