= 2003 Iowa Hawkeyes football team =

American college football season

2003 Iowa Hawkeyes football

Outback Bowl champion

Outback Bowl, W 37–17 vs. Florida
- Conference: Big Ten Conference

Ranking
- Coaches: No. 8
- AP: No. 8
- Record: 10–3 (5–3 Big Ten)
- Head coach: Kirk Ferentz (5th season)
- Offensive coordinator: Ken O'Keefe (5th season)
- Offensive scheme: Pro-style
- Defensive coordinator: Norm Parker (5th season)
- Base defense: 4–3
- MVPs: Robert Gallery; Bob Sanders
- Captains: Robert Gallery; Howard Hodges; Nate Kaeding; Fred Russell; Bob Sanders
- Home stadium: Kinnick Stadium

2003 Big Ten Conference football standings
	Conf.			Overall
Team	W		L	W		L
No. 6 Michigan $	7	–	1	10	–	3
No. 4 Ohio State %	6	–	2	11	–	2
No. 18 Purdue	6	–	2	9	–	4
No. 8 Iowa	5	–	3	10	–	3
No. 20 Minnesota	5	–	3	10	–	3
Michigan State	5	–	3	8	–	5
Wisconsin	4	–	4	7	–	6
Northwestern	4	–	4	6	–	7
Penn State	1	–	7	3	–	9
Indiana	1	–	7	2	–	10
Illinois	0	–	8	1	–	11
% – BCS at-large representative; $ – Conference champion; Rankings from AP Poll

The 2003 Iowa Hawkeyes football team represented the University of Iowa during the 2003 NCAA Division I-A football season. Following a 2002 season that saw the Hawkeyes finish 11–2 with a Big Ten Conference championship, expectations for a third straight bowl game were well warranted. With four offensive starters and seven defensive starters returning from the 2002 season, the Hawkeyes looked to be a primarily defensive team going into the season.

The Hawkeyes opened the season strong, winning games over Miami (OH), Buffalo, Iowa State and Arizona State en route to a 4–0 record. Undefeated and ranked ninth in the country, the Hawkeyes headed into East Lansing, Michigan for their Big Ten opener. Playing a Michigan State Spartans team that had just beaten Notre Dame a week earlier, the Hawkeyes turned the ball over four times and committed ten penalties in a 20–10 loss. However, with Michigan next up on the schedule, things would get no easier for the Hawkeyes. Before the game, Michigan held a 37–9–4 lead in the series between the two teams.

Down by 14 in the first quarter for the second straight game, the Hawkeyes came back to take a 30–20 lead midway through the fourth quarter. Michigan threatened the Iowa lead late, but the Hawkeyes held on for the 30–27 victory. After the victory, Iowa lost on the road to Ohio State, but followed with home wins over Illinois and Penn State. With a loss to Purdue, Iowa's record was 7–3 with two regular season games remaining. Playing against Minnesota and the Big Ten's top-ranked offense, the Hawkeyes scored 33 points before the Gophers scored a touchdown.

Following the 40–22 victory, the Hawkeyes fell behind unranked Wisconsin 21–7 during the second quarter. Needing a pass deflection in the end zone by Sean Considine with no time remaining, the Hawkeyes scored 20 straight points and escaped with a 27–21 win and a 9–3 regular season record. Playing in the 2004 Outback Bowl on January 1, 2004, the Hawkeyes won their first game in the state of Florida with a 37–17 victory over the Florida Gators. The win was also Iowa's first in the month of January since 1959.

== Schedule ==
Date	Time	Opponent	Rank	Site	TV	Result	Attendance
August 30	11:00 p.m.	Miami (OH)*		Kinnick Stadium; Iowa City, IA	ESPN2	W 21–3	54,128
September 6	11:00 a.m.	Buffalo*		Kinnick Stadium; Iowa City, IA	ESPN Plus	W 56–7	54,471
September 13	11:30 a.m.	at Iowa State*	No. 23	Jack Trice Stadium; Ames, IA (rivalry)	FSN	W 40–21	53,488
September 20	5:00 p.m.	No. 16 Arizona State*	No. 18	Kinnick Stadium; Iowa City, IA	ESPN2	W 21–2	70,397
September 27	11:00 a.m.	at Michigan State	No. 13	Spartan Stadium; East Lansing, MI	ESPN Plus	L 10–20	72,276
October 4	2:30 p.m.	No. 9 Michigan^{†}	No. 23	Kinnick Stadium; Iowa City, IA	ABC	W 30–27	70,397
October 18	2:30 p.m.	at No. 8 Ohio State	No. 9	Ohio Stadium; Columbus, OH	ABC	L 10–19	105,044
October 25	11:00 a.m.	Penn State	No. 16	Kinnick Stadium; Iowa City, IA	ABC	W 26–14	70,397
November 1	11:00 a.m.	Illinois	No. 13	Kinnick Stadium; Iowa City, IA	ESPN Plus	W 41–10	70,397
November 8	2:30 p.m.	at No. 16 Purdue	No. 10	Ross–Ade Stadium; West Lafayette, IN	ESPN	L 14–27	60,058
November 15	11:00 a.m.	No. 19 Minnesota	No. 20	Kinnick Stadium; Iowa City, IA (rivalry)	ESPN	W 40–22	70,397
November 22	2:30 p.m.	at Wisconsin	No. 17	Camp Randall Stadium; Madison, WI (rivalry)	ABC	W 27–21	79,931
January 1	10:00 a.m.	vs. No. 17 Florida*	No. 13	Raymond James Stadium; Tampa, FL (Outback Bowl)	ESPN	W 37–17	65,372
*Non-conference game; ^{†}Homecoming; Rankings from AP Poll released prior to the game; All times are in Central time

== Rankings ==
Ranking movements Legend: ██ Increase in ranking ██ Decrease in ranking RV = Received votes
	Week																
Poll	Pre	1	2	3	4	5	6	7	8	9	10	11	12	13	14	15	Final
AP	RV	RV	23	18	13	23	14	9	16	13	10	20	17	13	12	13	8
Coaches	RV	25	23	19	14	19	15	9	16	14	10	20	17	12	11	12	8
BCS	Not released								15	11	11	20	18	12	12	13	Not released

== Before the season ==
=== Recruiting class ===
On National Signing Day, February 5, 2003, the Hawkeyes signed 22 players on football scholarships.

=== Preseason rankings ===
Entering the season, Iowa was unranked by both major polls. However, the Hawkeyes would debut in the Coaches Poll as the 25th-ranked team before their first game against Miami University.

== Game summaries ==
=== Miami (OH) ===
Miami (Ohio) at Iowa

Team	1	2	3	4	Total
RedHawks	3	0	0	0	3
• Hawkeyes	7	7	0	7	21

- Date: August 30
- Location: Kinnick Stadium, Iowa City, IA
- Game start: 11:05 a.m. CDT
- Elapsed time: 2:55
- Game attendance: 54,128
- Game weather: 70 °F (21 °C), Partly Cloudy, Wind E 12 mph (19 km/h)
- Referee: Dave Witvoet
- TV announcers (ESPN2): Pam Ward (play-by-play) & Chris Spielman (color)
- Source: Box Score

Scoring summary
1	5:28	MIA	Jared Parseghian 21-yard field goal	Miami (OH) 3–0
1	:00	IOWA	Aaron Mickens 7-yard pass from Nathan Chandler (Nate Kaeding kick)	Iowa 7–3
2	:15	IOWA	Fred Russell 1-yard run (Nate Kaeding kick)	Iowa 14–3
4	10:43	IOWA	Maurice Brown 28-yard pass from Nathan Chandler (Nate Kaeding kick)	Iowa 21–3

Future NFL star Ben Roethlisberger was intercepted four times on this opening day victory for the Hawkeyes. The win would prove more impressive as the season progressed as the Redhawks went on to win their last 13 games and were the eventual MAC conference champion.

Statistics	M-OH	IOWA
First downs	22	17
Total yards	304	361
Rushing yards	54	232
Passing yards	250	129
Turnovers	4	1
Time of possession	33:34	26:26

=== Buffalo ===
Buffalo at Iowa

Team	1	2	3	4	Total
Bulls	0	0	0	7	7
• Hawkeyes	21	21	14	0	56

- Date: September 6
- Location: Kinnick Stadium, Iowa City, IA
- Game start: 11:10 a.m. CDT
- Elapsed time: 3:00
- Game attendance: 54,471
- Game weather: 73 °F (23 °C), Sunny, Wind SSW 8 mph (13 km/h)
- Referee: Dan Capron
- TV announcers (ESPN Plus): Larry Morgan (play-by-play) & Marv Cook (color)
- Source: Box Score

Scoring summary
1	10:03	IOWA	Ed Hinkel 5-yard pass from Nathan Chandler (Nate Kaeding kick)	Iowa 7–0
1	2:04	IOWA	Fred Russell 1-yard run (Nate Kaeding kick)	Iowa 14–0
1	1:04	IOWA	Sean Considine 18-yard fumble return (Nate Kaeding kick)	Iowa 21–0
2	13:01	IOWA	Nathan Chandler 1-yard run (Nate Kaeding kick0	Iowa 28–0
2	9:23	IOWA	Maurice Brown 23-yard pass from Nathan Chandler (Nate Kaeding kick)	Iowa 35–0
2	2:03	IOWA	A.J. Johnson 2-yard run (Kyle Schlicher kick)	Iowa 42–0
3	3:39	IOWA	Marcus Schnoor 2-yard run (Kyle Schlicher kick)	Iowa 49–0
3	1:39	IOWA	Ramon Ochoa 70-yard punt return (Kyle Schlicher kick)	Iowa 56–0
4	6:34	BUF	Aaron Leeper 2-yard run (Dallas Pelz kick)	Iowa 56–7

Nathan Chandler and the Iowa offense were unstoppable in this one-sided affair. Future NFL player Sean Considine returned a fumble for a touchdown and Ramon Ochoa returned a punt 70 yards for a score as well as the Hawkeyes were clicking in every phase of the game.

Statistics	BUF	IOWA
First downs	19	28
Total yards	285	442
Rushing yards	227	292
Passing yards	58	150
Turnovers	3	0
Time of possession	31:52	28:08

=== at Iowa State ===
No. 23 Iowa at Iowa State

Team	1	2	3	4	Total
• No. 23 Hawkeyes	10	10	13	7	40
Cyclones	7	0	0	14	21

- Date: September 13
- Location: Jack Trice Stadium, Ames, IA
- Game start: 11:40 a.m. CDT
- Elapsed time: 3:11
- Game attendance: 53,488
- Game weather: 63 °F (17 °C), Rain, Wind NW 10 mph (16 km/h)
- Referee: Richard Honig
- TV announcers (FSN): Joel Meyers (play-by-play), Dave Lapham (color) & Jim Knox (sideline)
- Source: Box Score

Scoring summary
1	12:06	Iowa	Nate Kaeding 42-yard field goal	Iowa 3–0
1	6:16	Iowa	Maurice Brown 17-yard pass from Nathan Chandler (Nate Kaeding kick)	Iowa 10–0
1	:43	ISU	Austin Flynn 25-yard run (Adam Beinke kick)	Iowa 10–7
2	13:16	Iowa	Fred Russell 3-yard run (Nate Kaeding kick)	Iowa 17–7
2	3:22	Iowa	Nate Kaeding 23-yard field goal	Iowa 20–7
3	14:19	Iowa	Chris Smith recovered blocked punt in end zone (Nate Kaeding kick)	Iowa 27–7
3	8:25	Iowa	Nate Kaeding 19-yard field goal	Iowa 30–7
3	4:51	Iowa	Nate Kaeding 20-yard field goal	Iowa 33–7
4	6:10	ISU	Lane Danielsen 9-yard pass from Austin Flynn (Adam Beinke kick)	Iowa 33–14
4	2:48	Iowa	Marcus Schnoor 33-yard run (Nate Kaeding kick)	Iowa 40–14
4	2:16	ISU	Jack Whitver 69-yard pass from Cris Love Jr. (Adam Beinke kick)	Iowa 40–21

Iowa was able to end the five-year losing streak to their in-state rival in this dominant win. Iowa State had the ball for almost 10 more minutes but the Hawkeyes held them to just a touchdown through the first three quarters of play. Four field goals by future NFL kicker Nate Kaeding kept Iowa in control throughout the game.

Statistics	IOWA	ISU
First downs	10	22
Total yards	243	390
Rushing yards	171	71
Passing yards	72	319
Turnovers	1	2
Time of possession	25:23	34:37

=== No. 16 Arizona State ===
No. 16 Arizona State at No. 18 Iowa

Team	1	2	3	4	Total
No. 16 Sun Devils	2	0	0	0	2
• No. 18 Hawkeyes	0	14	7	0	21

- Date: September 20
- Location: Kinnick Stadium, Iowa City, IA
- Game start: 5:05 p.m. CDT
- Elapsed time: 3:00
- Game attendance: 70,397
- Game weather: 72 °F (22 °C), Fair, Wind SSE 8 mph (13 km/h)
- Referee: Jim Lapentina
- TV announcers (ESPN2): Dave Barnett (play-by-play), Bill Curry (color), Craig James (color) & Heather Cox (sideline)
- Source: Box Score

Scoring summary
1	9:21	ASU	Safety, Ferentz recovered fumble in end zone	ASU 2–0
2	7:43	IOWA	Ochoa 40-yard pass from Chandler (Kaeding kick)	IOWA 7–2
2	3:20	IOWA	Jensen 2-yard pass from Chandler (Kaeding kick)	IOWA 14–2
3	12:06	IOWA	Ochoa 3-yard pass from Chandler (Kaeding kick)	IOWA 21–2

After surrendering a safety early, the Hawkeyes made sure they were the only team to score for the remainder of the game. Nathan Chandler threw three touchdowns on the day with two of them going to Ramon Ochoa. The Iowa defense clamped down on the Sun Devils, allowing only 184 total yards and just 24 rushing yards. Iowa was off to a 4–0 start for the first time since 1997.

Statistics	ASU	IOWA
First downs	12	19
Total yards	184	307
Rushing yards	24	153
Passing yards	160	154
Turnovers	1	2
Time of possession	26:40	33:20

=== at Michigan State ===
No. 13 Iowa at Michigan State

Team	1	2	3	4	Total
No. 13 Hawkeyes	0	7	3	0	10
• Spartans	14	3	0	3	20

- Date: September 27
- Location: Spartan Stadium, East Lansing, MI
- Game start: 11:10 a.m. CDT
- Elapsed time: 3:10
- Game attendance: 72,276
- Game weather: 58 °F (14 °C), Partly Cloudy, Wind SW 18–25 mph (29–40 km/h)
- Referee: Steve Patmon
- TV announcers (ESPN Plus): Craig Coshun (play-by-play) & Kelly Stouffer (color)
- Source: Box Score

Scoring summary
1	10:56	MSU	Z. Kavanaght 17-yd pass from Jeff Smoker (Dave Rayner kick)	MSU 7–0
1	7:24	MSU	E. Knott 7-yd pass from J. Smoker (D. Rayner kick)	MSU 14–0
2	14:56	IOWA	Follett 6-yd pass from N. Chandler (Kaeding kick)	MSU 14–7
2	0:19	MSU	Rayner 23-yd field goal	MSU 17–7
3	11:22	IOWA	Kaeding 23-yd field goal	MSU 17–10
4	10:27	MSU	Rayner 23-yd field goal	MSU 20–10

Four turnovers had the Hawkeyes playing from behind all day. A Nate Kaeding field goal early in the third quarter made it a one possession game, but the Iowa offense was unable to score again. Michigan State went on to start 4–0 in Big Ten play and vault to No. 9 in the AP poll before a late season slide.

Statistics	IOWA	MSU
First downs	14	17
Total yards	265	263
Rushing yards	107	45
Passing yards	158	218
Turnovers	4	0
Time of possession	26:47	33:13

=== No. 9 Michigan ===
No. 9 Michigan at No. 23 Iowa

Team	1	2	3	4	Total
No. 9 Wolverines	14	6	0	7	27
• No. 23 Hawkeyes	7	10	6	7	30

- Date: October 4
- Location: Kinnick Stadium, Iowa City, IA
- Game start: 2:35 p.m. CDT
- Elapsed time: 3:40
- Game attendance: 70,397
- Game weather: 70 °F (21 °C), Partly Cloudy, Wind NW 10 mph (16 km/h)
- Referee: Steve Newman
- TV announcers (ABC): Brad Nessler (play-by-play), Bob Griese (color) & lynn Swann (Sideline)
- Source: Box Score

Scoring summary
1	Mich	Chris Perry 5-yard run (Garrett Rivas kick)	Michigan 7–0
1	Mich	Braylon Edwards 14-yard pass from John Navarre (Garrett Rivas kick)	Michigan 14-0
1	IOWA	Nathan Chandler 5-yard run (Nate Kaeding kick)	Michigan 14–7
2	Mich	Garrett Rivas 47-yard field goal	Michigan 17–7
2	IOWA	Nate Kaeding 34-yard field goal	Michigan 17–10
2	Mich	Garrett Rivas 26-yard field goal	Michigan 20–10
2	IOWA	Calvin Davis 6-yard pass from Nathan Chandler (Nate Kaeding kick)	Michigan 20-17
3	IOWA	Nate Kaeding 25-yard field goal	Tied 20-20
3	IOWA	Nate Kaeding 31-yard field goal	Tied 23-20
4	IOWA	Ramon Ochoa 31-yard pass from Nathan Chandler (Nate Kaeding kick)	Iowa 30–20
4	Mich	Braylon Edwards 41-yard pass from John Navarre (Garrett Rivas kick)	Iowa 30–27

After the loss to Sparty, Iowa put together their impressive win in the season by handing the eventual conference champion Wolverines their only Big Ten loss.

Statistics	MICH	IOWA
First downs	18	14
Total yards	463	295
Rushing yards	74	100
Passing yards	389	195
Turnovers	1	1
Time of possession	29:04	30:56

=== at No. 8 Ohio State ===
No. 9 Iowa at No. 8 Ohio State

Team	1	2	3	4	Total
No. 9 Hawkeyes	3	0	0	7	10
• No. 8 Buckeyes	10	0	7	2	19

- Date: October 18
- Location: Ohio Stadium, Columbus, OH
- Game start: 2:36 p.m. CDT
- Elapsed time: 3:11
- Game attendance: 105,044
- Game weather: 58 °F (14 °C), Clear and Cool, Wind SSW 12 mph (19 km/h)
- Referee: Richard Honing
- TV announcers (ABC): Brent Musburger (play-by-play)
- Source: Box Score

Scoring summary
1	9:56	OSU	Nugent 53-yard field goal	OSU 3–0
1	9:22	OSU	M. Jenkins 54-yard punt return (Nugent kick)	OSU 10–0
1	2:45	Iowa	Kaeding 36-yard field goal	OSU 10–3
3	7:54	OSU	D. Whitner blocked punt return (Nugent kick)	OSU 17–3
4	14:09	Iowa	Kaeding 5-yard run (Kaeding kick)	OSU 17–10
4	3:03	OSU	Team Safety	OSU 19–10

All three touchdowns scored in this slugfest came on special teams plays. While holding Ohio State to just 185 yards of offense, Iowa made too many mistakes to overtake the Buckeyes in Columbus.

Statistics	IOWA	OSU
First downs	15	11
Total yards	219	185
Rushing yards	66	56
Passing yards	153	129
Turnovers	3	1
Time of possession	29:52	30:08

=== Penn State ===
Penn State at No. 16 Iowa

Team	1	2	3	4	Total
Nittany Lions	7	0	7	0	14
• No. 16 Hawkeyes	0	12	14	0	26

- Date: October 25
- Location: Kinnick Stadium, Iowa City, IA
- Game start: 11:11 a.m. CDT
- Elapsed time: 3:10
- Game attendance: 70,397
- Game weather: 43 °F (6 °C), Fair, Wind NW 9 mph (14 km/h)
- Referee: Dave Witvoet
- TV announcers (ABC): Brad Nessler (play-by-play), Bob Griese (color) & Lynn Swann (sideline)
- Source: Box Score

Scoring summary
1	2:57	PSU	Yisrael 82-yard interception return (Robbie Gould kick)	PSU 7–0
2	13:54	Iowa	Melloy 2-yard pass from Chandler (kick blocked)	PSU 7–6
2	8:25	Iowa	Ochoa 5-yard pass from Chandler (run failed)	Iowa 12–7
3	13:39	Iowa	Roberts recovered blocked punt in end zone (Kaeding kick)	Iowa 19–7
3	3:10	Iowa	Chandler 1-yard run (Kaeding kick)	Iowa 26–7
3	1:36	PSU	Scott 24-yard pass from Mills (Gould kick)	Iowa 26–14

Statistics	PSU	IOWA
First downs	9	20
Total yards	176	386
Rushing yards	38	212
Passing yards	138	174
Turnovers	1	3
Time of possession	26:49	33:11

=== Illinois ===
Illinois at No. 13 Iowa

Team	1	2	3	4	Total
Fighting Illini	0	0	0	10	10
• No. 13 Hawkeyes	7	10	17	7	41

- Date: November 1
- Location: Kinnick Stadium, Iowa City, IA
- Game start: 11:10 a.m. CST
- Elapsed time: 3:10
- Game attendance: 70,397
- Game weather: 40 °F (4 °C), Fair, Wind NNE 5 mph (8.0 km/h)
- Referee: Steve Newman
- Television network: ESPN Plus
- Source: Box Score

Scoring summary
1	5:54	Iowa	T. Jackson 1-yard pass from N. Chandler (Kaeding kick)	Iowa 7–0
2	12:43	Iowa	Kaeding 23-yard field goal	Iowa 10–0
2	0:52	Iowa	F. Russell 2-yard run (Kaeding kick)	Iowa 17–0
3	10:16	Iowa	Kaeding 24-yard field goal	Iowa 20–0
3	5:56	Iowa	Bob Sanders 3-yard fumble return (Kaeding kick)	Iowa 27–0
3	2:48	Iowa	F. Russell 14-yard run (Kaeding kick)	Iowa 34–0
4	12:22	Illinois	Cornfeld 3-yard pass from Pazan (Gockman kick)	Iowa 34–7
4	7:58	Illinois	Gockman 24-yard field goal	Iowa 34–10
4	3:12	Iowa	Matt Melloy 13-yard pass from Drew Tate (Kaeding kick)	Iowa 41–10

The Hawkeyes rolled up over 500 yards of total offense in a balanced attack and thorough dismantling of the Illini.

Statistics	ILL	IOWA
First downs	12	24
Total yards	265	505
Rushing yards	59	244
Passing yards	206	261
Turnovers	2	1
Time of possession	23:49	36:11

=== at No. 16 Purdue ===
No. 10 Iowa Hawkeyes (7–2) at No. 16 Purdue Boilermakers (7–2)

Quarter	1	2	3	4	Total
Iowa	0	0	7	7	14
Purdue	7	6	14	0	27

at Ross–Ade Stadium, West Lafayette, Indiana

- Date: November 8, 2003
- Game time: 3:30 p.m.
- Game weather: Clear, 38 °F (3 °C)
- Game attendance: 60,058
- Referee: Richard Honig
- TV announcers (ESPN): Mark Jones, Bob Davie, and Holly Rowe
- Box Score

Game information

First quarter

- PUR – Jerod Void 9-yard run (Ben Jones kick), 11:03. Purdue 7–0. Drive: 6 plays, 52 yards.

Second quarter

- PUR – Ben Jones 44-yard field goal, 10:23. Purdue 10–0. Drive: 10 plays, 53 yards.
- PUR – Ben Jones 42-yard field goal, 0:00. Purdue 13–0. Drive: 1 play, 0 yards.

Third quarter

- PUR – Anthony Chambers 45-yard pass from Kyle Orton (Ben Jones kick), 13:54. Purdue 20–0. Drive: 3 plays, 50 yards.
- PUR – Jerod Void 1-yard run (Ben Jones kick), 7:30. Purdue 27–0. Drive: 14 plays, 63 yards.
- IOWA – Nathan Chandler 3-yard run (Nate Kaeding kick), 3:05. Purdue 27–7. Drive: 9 plays, 63 yards.

Fourth quarter

- IOWA – Jermelle Lewis 8-yard pass from Nathan Chandler (Nate Kaeding kick), 9:56. Purdue 27–14. Drive: 12 plays, 67 yards.

Top passers

- IOWA – Nathan Chandler – 16/28, 203 yards, TD, INT
- PUR – Kyle Orton – 13/20, 167 yards, TD

Top rushers

- IOWA – Jermelle Lewis – 7 rushes, 56 yards
- PUR – Jerod Void – 34 rushes, 120 yards, 2 TD

Top receivers

- IOWA – Maurice Brown – 8 receptions, 126 yards
- PUR – John Standeford – 5 receptions, 61 yards

Statistics	IOWA	PUR
First downs	16	16
Total yards	301	321
Rushing yards	98	154
Passing yards	203	167
Turnovers	1	0
Time of possession	28:19	31:41

=== No. 19 Minnesota ===
No. 19 Minnesota at No. 20 Iowa

Team	1	2	3	4	Total
No. 19 Golden Gophers	6	0	0	16	22
• No. 20 Hawkeyes	3	17	13	7	40

- Date: November 15
- Location: Kinnick Stadium, Iowa City, IA
- Game start: 11:02 a.m. CST
- Elapsed time: 3:23
- Game attendance: 70,397
- Game weather: 42 °F (6 °C), Overcast, Wind SSE 8 mph (13 km/h)
- Referee: Jim Lapetina
- Television network: ESPN
- Source: Box Score

Scoring summary
1	13:31	Iowa	Kaeding 27-yard field goal	Iowa 3–0
1	8:29	Minn	Lloyd 33-yard field goal	Tied 3–3
1	1:10	Minn	Lloyd 44-yard field goal	Minn 6–3
2	13:58	Iowa	N. Chandler 2-yard run (Kaeding kick)	Iowa 10–6
2	3:40	Iowa	J. Lewis 34-yard run (Kaeding kick)	Iowa 17–6
2	0:02	Iowa	Kaeding 55-yard field goal	Iowa 20–6
3	13:01	Iowa	Kaeding 33-yard field goal	Iowa 23–6
3	9:46	Iowa	Kaeding 38-yard field goal	Iowa 26–6
3	2:41	Iowa	R. Ochoa 6-yard pass from N. Chandler (Kaeding kick)	Iowa 33–6
4	11:37	Iowa	E. Cervantes 1-yard run (Kaeding kick)	Iowa 40–6
4	4:52	Minn	Tapeh 2-yard run (Spaeth pass from Abdul-Khaliq)	Iowa 40–14
4	1:08	Minn	Tapeh 5-yard run (Hosack pass from Abdul-Khaliq)	Iowa 40–22

Coming off a loss to the Boilermakers, No. 19 Minnesota didn't stand a chance in Kinnick Stadium. Two Rhys Lloyd field goals gave the Gophers a 6–3 lead before the Hawkeyes rattled off 37 straight points. Iowa led 40–6 before two Minnesota TDs in the last five minutes.

Statistics	MINN	IOWA
First downs	29	15
Total yards	563	344
Rushing yards	175	134
Passing yards	388	210
Turnovers	5	1
Time of possession	35:34	25:26

=== at Wisconsin ===
No. 17 Iowa at Wisconsin

Team	1	2	3	4	Total
• No. 17 Hawkeyes	7	10	7	3	27
Badgers	14	7	0	0	21

- Date: November 22
- Location: Camp Randall Stadium, Madison, WI
- Game start: 11:40 a.m. CST
- Elapsed time: 3:30
- Game attendance: 79,931
- Game weather: 38 °F (3 °C), Drizzle, Wind NE 13 mph (21 km/h)
- Referee: Dennis Lipski
- TV announcers (ABC): Tim Brant and Ed Cunningham
- Source: Box Score

Scoring summary
1	11:05	Iowa	R. Ochoa 18-yard run (Kaeding kick)	Iowa 7–0
1	7:32	WIS	A. Davis 1-yard run (Allen kick)	Tied 7–7
1	0:11	WIS	A. Davis 4-yard run (Allen kick)	WIS 14–7
2	10:08	WIS	D. Smith 1-yard run (Allen kick)	WIS 21–7
2	4:42	Iowa	R. Ochoa 6-yard pass from N. Chandler (Kaeding kick)	WIS 21–14
2	0:11	Iowa	Kaeding 50-yard field goal	WIS 21–17
3	2:11	Iowa	F. Russell 1-yard run (Kaeding kick)	Iowa 24–21
4	13:59	Iowa	Kaeding 28-yard field goal	Iowa 27–21

Statistics	IOWA	WIS
First downs	9	17
Total yards	267	365
Rushing yards	201	171
Passing yards	66	194
Turnovers	3	4
Time of possession	27:15	32:45

=== vs. No. 17 Florida (Outback Bowl) ===
No. 13 Iowa vs. No. 17 Florida

Team	1	2	3	4	Total
• No. 13 Hawkeyes	7	13	14	3	37
No. 17 Gators	7	0	3	7	17

- Date: January 1, 2004
- Location: Raymond James Stadium, Tampa, FL
- Game start: 11:00 a.m. CST
- Elapsed time: 3:30
- Game attendance: 65,372
- Game weather: 67 °F (19 °C), Sunny & Clear, Wind E 6 mph (9.7 km/h)
- Referee: Clair Gausman
- TV announcers (ESPN): Mark Jones (play-by-play), Bob Davie (color commentator), Holly Rowe (sideline reporter)
- Source: Box Score

Scoring summary
1	7:18	UF	K. Kight 70-yard pass from Chris Leak (Leach kick)	UF 7–0
1	3:56	Iowa	M. Brown 3-yard pass from N. Chandler (Kaeding kick)	Tied 7–7
2	14:09	Iowa	Kaeding 47-yard field goal	Iowa 10–7
2	8:56	Iowa	N. Chandler 5-yard run (Kaeding kick)	Iowa 17–7
2	0:56	Iowa	Kaeding 32-yard field goal	Iowa 20–7
3	14:06	Iowa	M. Melloy 0-yard blocked punt return (Kaeding kick)	Iowa 27–7
3	11:19	UF	Leach 48-yard field goal	Iowa 27–10
3	4:37	Iowa	F. Russell 34-yard run (Kaeding kick)	Iowa 34–10
4	13:59	Iowa	Kaeding 38-yard field goal	Iowa 37–10
4	3:47	UF	Dallas Baker 25-yard pass from C. Leak (Leach kick)	Iowa 37–17

A Chris Leak-led Florida team had the initial score in Iowa's first Outback Bowl appearance but from that point the game belonged to the Hawkeyes. Iowa scored 27 unanswered points and put up over 400 yards of total offense as they controlled the ball and field position for the majority of the contest.

Statistics	IOWA	UF
First downs	22	16
Total yards	408	325
Rushing yards	238	57
Passing yards	170	268
Turnovers	1	0
Time of possession	34:10	25:50

== Roster ==
2003 Iowa Hawkeyes football team roster
Players
Coaches
Offense

Pos.	#	Name	Class
WR	9	Maurice Brown	Sr
FB	40	Edgar Cervantes	Sr
QB	10	Nathan Chandler	Sr
TE	87	Scott Chandler	Fr
WR	22	Calvin Davis	Fr
OL	61	Brian Ferentz	So
OL	78	Robert Gallery	Sr
WR	11	Ed Hinkel	So
WR	86	Warren Holloway	Jr
TE	81	Tony Jackson	Jr
TE	35	Erik Jensen	Sr
OL	76	Mike Jones	Fr
RB	29	Jermelle Lewis	Jr
OL	69	Pete McMahon	Jr
WR	84	Matt Melloy	So
RB	2	Fred Russell	Sr
RB	23	Marcus Schnoor	So
QB	5	Drew Tate	Fr

Defense

Pos.	#	Name	Class
CB	20	Antwan Allen	So
DL	45	Jonathan Babineaux	Jr
DL	90	Jared Clauss	Sr
DB	37	Sean Considine	Jr
LB	18	Chad Greenway	So
LB	52	Abdul Hodge	So
DL	48	Howard Hodges	Sr
LB	44	Mike Humpal	Fr
DB	26	Jovon Johnson	So
LB	40	Mike Klinkenborg	Fr
DT	99	Bryan Mattison	Fr
LB	27	Edmond Miles	So
DL	98	Derreck Robinson	Jr
DL	31	Matt Roth	Jr
DB	33	Bob Sanders	Sr
LB	42	Grant Steen	Sr

Special teams

Pos.	#	Name	Class
P	28	David Bradley	Jr
K	95	Nate Kaeding	Sr
K	1	Kyle Schlicher	Fr

Head coach

- Kirk Ferentz

Coordinators/assistant coaches

Legend

- (C) Team captain
- (S) Suspended
- (I) Ineligible
- Injured
- Redshirt

== Postseason awards ==
- Robert Gallery - Winner of the Outland Trophy, presented to the nation's best interior lineman. Also received consensus first-team All-American honors.
- Nate Kaeding - First-team All-American honors at kicker, along with Nick Browne (TCU) and Drew Dunning (Washington State).

== Team players in the 2004 NFL draft ==
Player	Position	Round	Pick	NFL club
Robert Gallery	Tackle	1	2	Oakland Raiders
Bob Sanders	Free Safety	2	44	Indianapolis Colts
Nate Kaeding	Kicker	3	65	San Diego Chargers
Jared Clauss	Defensive Tackle	7	230	Tennessee Titans
Erik Jensen	Tight End	7	237	St. Louis Rams
