= 2003 Purdue Boilermakers football team =

American college football season

2003 Purdue Boilermakers football

Capital One Bowl, L 27–34 ^{OT} vs. Georgia
- Conference: Big Ten Conference

Ranking
- Coaches: No. 19
- AP: No. 18
- Record: 9–4 (6–2 Big Ten)
- Head coach: Joe Tiller (7th season)
- Offensive coordinator: Jim Chaney (7th season)
- Offensive scheme: Spread
- Defensive coordinator: Brock Spack (7th season)
- Base defense: 4–3
- MVP: Shaun Phillips
- Captains: Nick Hardwick; Landon Johnson; Niko Koutouvides; Stuart Schweigert
- Home stadium: Ross–Ade Stadium

2003 Big Ten Conference football standings
	Conf.			Overall
Team	W		L	W		L
No. 6 Michigan $	7	–	1	10	–	3
No. 4 Ohio State %	6	–	2	11	–	2
No. 18 Purdue	6	–	2	9	–	4
No. 8 Iowa	5	–	3	10	–	3
No. 20 Minnesota	5	–	3	10	–	3
Michigan State	5	–	3	8	–	5
Wisconsin	4	–	4	7	–	6
Northwestern	4	–	4	6	–	7
Penn State	1	–	7	3	–	9
Indiana	1	–	7	2	–	10
Illinois	0	–	8	1	–	11
% – BCS at-large representative; $ – Conference champion; Rankings from AP Poll

The 2003 Purdue Boilermakers football team represented Purdue University in the 2003 NCAA Division I-A football season. The team was coached by Joe Tiller and played its home games at Ross–Ade Stadium. Purdue played thirteen games in the 2003 season, finishing with a 9–4 record and a loss in the Capital One Bowl to Georgia.

== Schedule ==
Date	Time	Opponent	Rank	Site	TV	Result	Attendance
September 6	1:00 pm	Bowling Green*	No. 16	Ross–Ade Stadium; West Lafayette, Indiana		L 26–27	58,225
September 13	12:00 pm	at No. 20 Wake Forest*		Groves Stadium; Winston-Salem, North Carolina	ESPN	W 16–10	29,853
September 20	1:00 pm	Arizona*	No. 25	Ross–Ade Stadium; West Lafayette, Indiana		W 59–7	52,310
September 27	3:30 pm	Notre Dame*	No. 22	Ross–Ade Stadium; West Lafayette, Indiana (Shillelagh Trophy)	ABC	W 23–10	64,614
October 4	4:30 pm	Illinois	No. 22	Ross–Ade Stadium; West Lafayette, Indiana	ESPN	W 43–10	64,139
October 11	3:30 pm	Penn State	No. 18	Ross–Ade Stadium; West Lafayette, Indiana	ABC	W 28–14	59,720
October 18	12:00 pm	at No. 14 Wisconsin	No. 13	Camp Randall Stadium; Madison, Wisconsin (College GameDay)	ESPN	W 26–23	79,541
October 25	3:30 pm	at No. 13 Michigan	No. 10	Michigan Stadium; Ann Arbor, Michigan	ABC	L 3–31	111,349
November 1	12:00 pm	Northwestern	No. 18	Ross–Ade Stadium; West Lafayette, Indiana	ESPN	W 34–14	51,110
November 8	3:30 pm	No. 10 Iowa	No. 16	Ross–Ade Stadium; West Lafayette, Indiana	ESPN	W 27–14	60,058
November 15	3:30 pm	at No. 4 Ohio State	No. 11	Ohio Stadium; Columbus, Ohio (College GameDay)	ABC	L 13–16 ^{OT}	105,286
November 22	12:00 pm	at Indiana	No. 16	Memorial Stadium; Bloomington, Indiana (Old Oaken Bucket)	ESPN+	W 24–16	41,404
January 1	1:00 pm	vs. No. 11 Georgia*	No. 12	Florida Citrus Bowl; Orlando, Florida (Capital One Bowl)	ABC	L 27–34 ^{OT}	64,565
*Non-conference game; Rankings from AP Poll released prior to the game; All times are in Eastern time

== Rankings ==
Ranking movements Legend: ██ Increase in ranking ██ Decrease in ranking RV = Received votes
	Week																
Poll	Pre	1	2	3	4	5	6	7	8	9	10	11	12	13	14	15	Final
AP	19	16	RV	25	22	22	18	13	10	18	16	11	16	12	11	12	18
Coaches	22	20	RV	RV	RV	23	20	15	10	17	14	10	16	13	12	13	19
BCS	Not released								8	18	14	11	16	14	13	14	Not released

== Roster ==
2003 Purdue Boilermakers football team roster
Players
Coaches
Offense

Pos.	#	Name	Class
WR	2	Ray Williams	So
TE	3	Garret Bushong	Fr
QB	3	Jason Renn	Fr
WR	4	Anthony Chambers	Sr
QB	7	Kyle Smith	So
QB	8	Grant Walker	Fr
WR	10	Colya Dailey	Fr
QB	11	Brandon Kirsch	So
QB	14	Scott Carroll	Fr
QB	18	Kyle Orton	Jr
QB	19	Bill Foran	Fr
WR	20	Andre Chattams	Fr
WR	21	Taylor Stubblefield	Jr
RB	22	Jerome Brooks	Fr
WR	23	Kevin Noel	Jr
RB	27	Brandon Jones	So
WR	28	Dustin Keller	Fr
WR	31	Jake Standeford	Fr
RB	32	Jerod Void	So
RB	36	Brandon Golder	Fr
WR	38	Sean Bird	Fr
FB	42	Patrick Schaub	Sr
TE	43	Jeff Bennett	So
RB	48	Brian Wood	Fr
G	50	Tyler Moore	Jr
G	53	Nick Fincher	Fr
G	56	Matt Turner	So
C	61	Nick Hardwick	Sr
OT	63	David Owen	Jr
G	64	Danny May	Jr
OT	65	Mike Otto	Fr
G	67	Uche Nwaneri	Fr
G	68	Robbie Powell	Fr
OT	70	Pat Oxley	Fr
OT	71	Kelly Butler	Jr
C	74	Nick Pilipauskis	Sr
OT	75	Brian Wang	So
G	76	Willie Bach	Jr
OT	77	Ryan Noblet	Fr
OT	78	Josh Tomsheck	So
OL	79	Anthony Freimanis	Fr
WR	80	Jamaal Wilson	Sr
WR	81	Al Royal	Fr
WR	82	John Standeford	Sr
WR	83	Jake Cunningham	Fr
WR	84	Byron Williams	Fr
WR	85	Jameson Evans	So
WR	86	Chase Lecklider	Fr
TE	87	Charles Davis	Fr
WR	88	Drew Rucks	So
WR	89	Kyle Ingraham	Fr
TE	95	Jason Taranowski	Jr
TE	96	Billy Truty	Fr

Defense

Pos.	#	Name	Class
LB	5	Michael Durrett	Fr
S	6	Deaunte Ferrell	Sr
CB	8	Jacques Reeves	Sr
S	9	Stuart Schweigert	Sr
DE	10	Ray Edwards	Fr
CB	12	Antwaun Rogers	Jr
S	13	Eric Smith	Sr
DE	15	Shaun Phillips	Sr
LB	16	Gilbert Gardner	Sr
LB	17	Josh Ferguson	Fr
S	19	Marc Huddleston	So
CB	24	Sean Petty	So
CB	25	Paul Long	Fr
LB	30	George Hall	Fr
S	31	Bernard Pollard	Fr
CB	33	Brian Hickman	So
LB	34	Niko Koutouvides	Sr
S	35	Pat Kohtz	Fr
S	36	Torrey Vogel	Sr
S	37	Rafael Price	Fr
S	38	Brian Mattaway	Fr
LB	39	Bobby Iwuchukwu	So
DE	40	Kevin Nesfield	Sr
S	41	John Lampert	Fr
LB	44	Jon Goldsberry	Jr
DE	45	Eugene Bright	Fr
LB	47	Landon Johnson	Sr
DB	48	Steve Oliver	Fr
DE	49	Anthony Spencer	Fr
LB	51	Ben Block	Fr
LB	52	Jason Leimberger	So
DT	54	Doug Van Dyke	Fr
DT	55	Brandon Villarreal	So
DT	58	Brent Grover	So
LB	59	Stanford Keglar	Fr
DE	62	Vedran Dzolovic	Sr
DL	69	Jeff Tull	Fr
LB	90	Ryan Lincoln	Fr
DE	91	Nick Cavallo	Fr
DT	92	Craig Terrill	Sr
DT	94	Dontrey Flemings	So
DT	97	Vaughn Tomlin	Fr
DT	98	Dan McGowen	Fr

Special teams

Pos.	#	Name	Class
K	17	Andy Nelson	Sr
K	26	Berin Lacevic	Sr
P, K	29	Aaron Levin	Jr
K	35	Ben Jones	So
P	46	Brent Slaton	Sr
LS	72	Chris Mattson	Fr

Head coach

- Joe Tiller

Coordinators/assistant coaches

- Jim Chaney (offensive coordinator / tight ends)
- Brock Spack (defensive coordinator / linebackers)
- Blaine Bennett (quarterbacks)
- Gary Emanuel (assistant head coach / defensive ends)
- Mark Hagen (defensive tackles / special teams coordinator)
- Phil Elmassian (defensive backs)
- Bill Legg (offensive line)
- David Mitchell (running backs)
- Bob DeBesse (wide receivers / recruiting coordinator)
- Don Coller (director of football operations)
- Jim Lathrop (strength and conditioning)
- Chad Brown (graduate assistant)
- Burt Thornton (graduate assistant)

Legend

- (C) Team captain
- (S) Suspended
- (I) Ineligible
- Injured
- Redshirt

[GoldandBlack.com https://purdue.rivals.com/content.asp?CID=25033 Roster]
Last update: August 16, 2016

== Game summaries ==
=== Bowling Green State ===
Team	1	2	3	4	Total
• Bowling Green State	0	10	7	10	27
Purdue	7	3	7	9	26

- Date: September 6
- Location: Ross–Ade Stadium, West Lafayette, Indiana
- Game attendance: 58,225

A Purdue Boilermaker football team loaded with experience (8 senior starters on defense) entered 2003 with high expectations (#18 preseason ranking), but they suffered a stunning opening-day 27–26 upset loss to the MAC's Bowling Green Falcons.

After Purdue took the season's opening drive for a touchdown (a jump-ball touchdown catch by 6' 9" freshman WR Kyle Ingraham), Bowling Green QB Josh Harris responded with outstanding clutch play, throwing for 350 yards and 3 touchdowns in the see-saw contest. Midway through the 4th quarter with Purdue leading 24–20, the Boilermaker offense could not take advantage of a DE Shaun Phillips interception. With under 3 minutes remaining, Harris drove the Falcons down the field to a 4th and 14 situation at the Purdue 32-yard line. In a play eerily similar to the 2002 "Holy Buckeye" play, Harris evaded a heavy rush to deliver a deep pass to WR Charles Sharon, who outfought 2 Purdue defenders to make the winning touchdown catch.

Purdue WR Taylor Stubblefield had 16 catches for 139 yards and caught his first-ever regular season touchdown in defeat, but had an unfortunate drop on the final drive that could have set up a game-tying FG attempt. Falcons WR Cole Magner ran out the last 8 seconds of the game clock by taking an intentional safety, bringing the score to its final tally.

Bowling Green finished 11–3 with a Motor City Bowl win over Northwestern.

=== Wake Forest ===
Team	1	2	3	4	Total
• Purdue	3	10	0	3	16
Wake Forest	3	7	0	0	10

- Date: September 13
- Location: Groves Stadium, Winston-Salem, North Carolina
- Game attendance: 29,853
- TV announcers (ESPN): Mark Malone (Play-by-play), Bob Davie (Color) & Holly Rowe (Sideline)

Purdue rebounded from their opening day loss with a close win at #20 Wake Forest – which was ranked for the first time in 16 years after starting the season with two wins over ranked opponents.

Late in the close game with Purdue clinging to a 16–10 lead, the Deacons created an opportunity for victory by forcing a turnover on a punt return by Anthony Chambers. But the Purdue defense stopped Wake Forest on a 4th down running play thanks to a well-timed run blitz by All-American free safety Stuart Schweigert, who made a game-clinching tackle for loss. "Stu" earlier had set up a FG with an interception and long return on the game's first play from scrimmage.

Purdue kicker Ben Jones, a recent transfer from Butler University, made three important FGs that helped provide the final margin.

=== Arizona ===
Team	1	2	3	4	Total
Arizona	0	0	7	0	7
• Purdue	7	17	14	21	59

- Date: September 20
- Location: Ross–Ade Stadium, West Lafayette, Indiana
- Game attendance: 52,310

After the Boilermakers had worn primarily gold uniforms at home in 2002, the Boilermakers were "Back in Black" for the first of a four-game homestand that began with the struggling Arizona Wildcats of the Pac-10. The Boilermakers dominated Arizona by a then-Ross–Ade Stadium record margin of 59–7. The offense outgained Arizona 580–174 in yards, achieving near perfect balance with 288 rushing and 292 passing. Redshirt freshman RB Jerome Brooks paced Purdue with 122 yards on the ground, and the Purdue defense sacked Arizona QBs 5 times; fifth-year senior LB Landon Johnson recovered a fumble and had an interception.

=== Notre Dame ===
Team	1	2	3	4	Total
Notre Dame	0	10	0	0	10
• Purdue	10	3	3	7	23

- Date: September 27
- Location: Ross–Ade Stadium, West Lafayette, Indiana
- Game attendance: 64,614
- TV announcers (ABC): Brad Nessler (Play-by-play), Bob Griese (Color) & Lynn Swann (Sideline)

The Boilermakers improved to 3–1 and returned to the Top 25 with a win over their in-state rival Notre Dame. Purdue's senior-led defense continually pressured freshman QB Brady Quinn in his first college start with many knockdowns, and intercepted him 4 times (FS Stuart Schweigert had 2 picks). Still, Quinn managed to throw for 297 yards, but the Boilermaker defense made the Irish offense one-dimensional by limiting Julius Jones and the Irish running game to under 50 yards. The Irish defense played very well in defeat, holding Purdue to 223 yards of offense, but they could not force any Purdue turnovers.

The Boilermakers struck on their first drive with QB Kyle Orton's 36-yard touchdown pass to Ray Williams on a missed coverage assignment, then they turned LB Niko Koutouvides' interception into a FG for a 10–0 first quarter lead. The Irish pulled to 13–10 before the half on WR Maurice Stovall's 85-yard touchdown catch.

But the Irish did not score again. Quinn's third interception early in the 4th quarter was turned into a goal-line touchdown pass from Orton to DE Shaun Phillips, who lined up at TE on the play to provide the final 23–10 margin. It was Phillips' second career touchdown catch, duplicating his feat vs. Minnesota in 2002.

WR John Standeford became Purdue's all-time leader in receptions with 2 catches on the early touchdown drive. The record was short-lived however, as his teammate WR Taylor Stubblefield would shatter this mark in 2004.

=== Illinois ===
Team	1	2	3	4	Total
Illinois	0	3	0	7	10
• Purdue	20	7	10	6	43

- Date: October 4
- Location: Ross–Ade Stadium, West Lafayette, Indiana
- Game attendance: 64,139
- TV announcers (ESPN): Dave Barnett (Play-by-play), Bill Curry (Color) & Rob Stone (Sideline)

Purdue jumped all over their Homecoming opponent Illinois early and often in a 43–10 win in their Big Ten opener, bringing them to a 4–1 mark. The Boilermakers scored touchdowns on 4 of their first 5 drives to take a 27–0 lead by early in the 2nd quarter. Terrific protection by Nick Hardwick and the rest of the offensive line helped sophomore RB Jerod Void gain 119 yards rushing and 4 touchdowns. RB Jerome Brooks added 82 yards on the ground to help Purdue amass 300+ Team rushing yards.

Purdue's veteran defense shined once again, limiting QB Jon Beutjer and the Illinois offense to 191 total yards and no touchdowns. The lone Fighting Illini touchdown came on a punt return by RB E.B. Halsey.

=== Penn State ===
Team	1	2	3	4	Total
Penn State	0	14	0	0	14
• Purdue	7	10	3	8	28

- Date: October 11
- Location: Ross–Ade Stadium, West Lafayette, Indiana
- Game attendance: 59,720
- TV announcers (ABC): Tim Brant (Play-by-play), Ed Cunningham (Color) & Sam Ryan (Sideline)

Purdue improved to 5–1 with another solid defensive effort and a few terrific punt returns from Anthony Chambers, who returned one for a touchdown and set up 2 other touchdowns with long returns.

Penn State sophomore quarterback Michael Robinson, filling in for injured QB Zach Mills, had a difficult day (10–32; 98 yards, 2 interceptions) at the hands of the Purdue defense, who limited PSU to 204 total yards. After Chambers' punt return touchdown made the score 17–7, Purdue's late first half drive was thwarted by CB Alan Zemaitis' 90-yard interception return, which set up a short Robinson touchdown pass to Isaac Smolko to cut Purdue's lead to 3. But the Nittany Lions would not score again.

Starting RB Jerod Void was injured on his first run of the day on a tackle from LB Gino Capone. But Sophomore RB Brandon Jones was terrific in relief, physically pounding the young PSU defense with 149 yards on 29 carries, and scoring 2 goal-line touchdowns. Kicker Ben Jones missed his first FG of the season, but made his other 2 attempts, improving his early season tally to 9 FGs in 10 attempts.

=== Wisconsin ===
Team	1	2	3	4	Total
• Purdue	14	3	3	6	26
Wisconsin	7	6	0	10	23

- Date: October 18
- Location: Camp Randall Stadium, Madison, Wisconsin
- Game attendance: 79,541
- TV announcers (ESPN): Mark Jones (Play-by-play), Bob Davie (Color) & Holly Rowe (Sideline)

In a Big Ten classic hosted by ESPN College Football Gameday, the Boilermakers became bowl-eligible for the seventh year in a row under Joe Tiller by prevailing over #14 Wisconsin, which had ended Ohio State's 19-game winning streak the previous week.

Though the Boilermakers played conservatively on offense most of 2003, this game was an exception as Purdue's offense went with a Drew Brees-era style by featuring the passing game. QB Kyle Orton completed his first 15 passes to masterfully engineer touchdown drives on Purdue's first 2 possessions for a 14–0 lead. But Wisconsin rallied with an Anthony Davis touchdown run and LB Jeff Mack's fumble return for touchdown to close the margin to 14–13 early in the second quarter (the Badgers missed an extra point). The Badgers kept Purdue out of the end zone the rest of the game, but Purdue did add 3 field goals to produce a 23–16 lead. With less than 3 minutes left, Wisconsin safety Jim Leonhard made a spectacular punt return touchdown to tie the game. But that's when Orton guided the Purdue offense on a winning drive, setting up a Ben Jones FG with 3 seconds left. Orton converted 2 3rd down and long passes on the drive, and then completed a deep pass to WR Ray Williams to set up the winning kick.

In defeat, Wisconsin LB Alex Lewis recorded an amazing 5 sacks and forced the fumble that Mack returned for a touchdown. In victory, the Purdue defense continued its terrific 2003 season by sacking Badger QBs 9 times (Shaun Phillips had 4.5), yielding only 12 first downs and less than 300 yards of offense, and forcing 2 turnovers (including an interception by senior CB Jacques Reeves on Wisconsin's first play).

Kyle Orton completed his first 15 passes on the way to a 38–55; 411 yard performance. Senior WR John Standeford and junior WR Taylor Stubblefield combined to catch 30 passes for 314 yards. It was Stubblefield's second 16-catch performance of the season.

As of 2023, the 2003 contest is the Boilermakers' most recent win over the Badgers.

=== Michigan ===
Team	1	2	3	4	Total
Purdue	0	3	0	0	3
• Michigan	14	0	7	10	31

- Date: October 25
- Location: Michigan Stadium, Ann Arbor, Michigan
- Game attendance: 111,349
- TV announcers (ABC): Brent Musburger (Play-by-play), Gary Danielson (Color) & Jack Arute (Sideline)

Purdue's 6 game winning streak came to an end in Ann Arbor, dropping to 6–2 against the talented and eventual Big Ten champion #13 Michigan Wolverines. From start to finish, the Purdue offense was bullied, harassed and roughed-up by a Michigan defense that employed numerous blitzing schemes (7 sacks) and press "bump and run" coverage to limit the Boilermakers to only 242 yards of offense.

Despite being dominated, Purdue had a chance to seize momentum late in the first half when the Boilers recovered a fumble from a Shaun Phillips sack of Michigan QB John Navarre. QB Kyle Orton quickly moved the Purdue offense to a first and goal, but then threw an end zone interception to CB Leon Hall, the first of 2 picks for the freshman playing for an injured Marlin Jackson.

The Michigan offense had a solid day against the stout Purdue defense, as senior RB Chris Perry grinded out 95 yards on 28 carries. The WRs Braylon Edwards, Jason Avant and Steve Breaston each made contributions: Avant had 5 catches for 90 yards, Breaston took an end-around 21 yards for a score, and Edwards had 6 catches for 86 yards and 2 scores, including a highlight-reel third-quarter touchdown catch over CB Jacques Reeves that put the game out of reach.

Purdue coach Joe Tiller praised the Michigan receiving corps before and after the game as "the best...(he had) ever seen." He was impressed with what he referred to as the "creatures" on the Wolverine defense.

=== Northwestern ===
Team	1	2	3	4	Total
Northwestern	0	7	0	7	14
• Purdue	14	6	7	7	34

- Date: November 1
- Location: Ross–Ade Stadium, West Lafayette, Indiana
- Game attendance: 51,110
- TV announcers (ESPN): Mark Jones (Play-by-play), Bob Davie (Color) & Holly Rowe (Sideline)

The Boilermakers returned home and to their formula of ball control running, play-action passing and turnover-producing defense to bounce back from Ann Arbor, defeating the Northwestern Wildcats 34–14 to improve to 7–2 and stay in the hunt for a share of the Big Ten title.

The Wildcats had excelled at ball security with an NCAA-low 2 lost fumbles, but they came apart against the Purdue defense by losing 4 fumbles. Two of these were turned into first quarter touchdowns by the Boilermaker offense, led by an efficient Kyle Orton (14–24; 212 yards, 1 rushing touchdown). Late in the 3rd quarter, after the Purdue defense had stopped Northwestern on a goal line stand, the Boilermakers embarked on a 98-yard touchdown drive that ended with RB Jerod Void's 2nd touchdown run to effectively put the game away.

Senior WR John Standeford set the Big Ten career receiving yards record in this game, getting a brief ovation after a 31-yard catch in the 4th quarter.

=== Iowa ===
#10 Iowa Hawkeyes (7–2) at #16 Purdue Boilermakers (7–2)

Quarter	1	2	3	4	Total
Iowa	0	0	7	7	14
Purdue	7	6	14	0	27

at Ross–Ade Stadium, West Lafayette, Indiana

- Date: November 8, 2003
- Game time: 3:30 p.m.
- Game weather: Clear, 38 °F (3 °C)
- Game attendance: 60,058
- Referee: Richard Honig
- TV announcers (ESPN): Mark Jones, Bob Davie, and Holly Rowe
- Box Score

Game information

First quarter

- PUR – Jerod Void 9-yard run (Ben Jones kick), 11:03. Purdue 7–0. Drive: 6 plays, 52 yards.

Second quarter

- PUR – Ben Jones 44-yard field goal, 10:23. Purdue 10–0. Drive: 10 plays, 53 yards.
- PUR – Ben Jones 42-yard field goal, 0:00. Purdue 13–0. Drive: 1 play, 0 yards.

Third quarter

- PUR – Anthony Chambers 45-yard pass from Kyle Orton (Ben Jones kick), 13:54. Purdue 20–0. Drive: 3 plays, 50 yards.
- PUR – Jerod Void 1-yard run (Ben Jones kick), 7:30. Purdue 27–0. Drive: 14 plays, 63 yards.
- IOWA – Nathan Chandler 3-yard run (Nate Kaeding kick), 3:05. Purdue 27–7. Drive: 9 plays, 63 yards.

Fourth quarter

- IOWA – Jermelle Lewis 8-yard pass from Nathan Chandler (Nate Kaeding kick), 9:56. Purdue 27–14. Drive: 12 plays, 67 yards.

Top passers

- IOWA – Nathan Chandler – 16/28, 203 yards, TD, INT
- PUR – Kyle Orton – 13/20, 167 yards, TD

Top rushers

- IOWA – Jermelle Lewis – 7 rushes, 56 yards
- PUR – Jerod Void – 34 rushes, 120 yards, 2 TD

Top receivers

- IOWA – Maurice Brown – 8 receptions, 126 yards
- PUR – John Standeford – 5 receptions, 61 yards

On a Senior Day game with a notable defense, #14 Purdue scored a 27–14 win over #10 Iowa to improve the 8–2 – Purdue's previous best record this late into the season since 1979. Boilermaker sophomore RB Jerod Void had his best game of the season to date with 34 carries for 120 yards, and 2 touchdowns against the NCAA top 10 ranked Iowa run defense.

For the 8th time in 10 games, the Boilers took their opening drive for a score, as Void took advantage of terrific blocking by his offensive line and junior FB Jon Goldsberry for 22 and 9-yard runs, the latter going for a touchdown. Purdue then added 2 field goals before halftime, while Iowa miscues kept them scoreless. On two different occasions Iowa QB Nathan Chandler missed open receivers for touchdowns. On another drive a Chandler touchdown pass to WR Mo Brown was called back by penalty, and then the Hawkeyes came up empty when kicker Nate Kaeding missed his first FG of the year.

On the opening drive of the 2nd half, Purdue started with a kickoff return to midfield, and then converted a 3rd and 5 situation with QB Kyle Orton's 45-yard touchdown pass to WR Anthony Chambers for a 20–0 lead. On the Boilers' next possession, Orton's efficient passing and nifty bootleg runs set up Void's second touchdown for a 27–0 advantage with 7:30 left in the 3rd quarter. After Iowa drove for touchdowns on their next 2 possessions to narrow the score to 27–14 with 9:56 left in the game, Orton directed the Purdue offense on a ball-control 8 minute drive that featured numerous 3rd down conversions to bring the clock down to 2:09 to go, but Purdue came up empty when kicker Ben Jones missed a FG attempt. The Iowa offense then made the game interesting by moving into scoring position on a couple of brilliant Mo Brown receptions. But Purdue free safety Stuart Schweigert – playing in his last home game – put an end to the Hawkeye rally with an end zone interception.

Notwithstanding the late rally, Purdue's defense had another fine performance, as it held terrific Iowa RB Fred Russell to 35 yards rushing on 18 carries, and sacked Chandler 4 times.

=== Ohio State ===
Purdue Boilermakers (8–2) at Ohio State Buckeyes (9–1)

Quarter	1	2	3	4	OT	Total
Purdue	3	3	0	7	0	13
Ohio St	0	6	0	7	3	16

at Ohio Stadium • Columbus, Ohio

- Date: November 15
- Game time: 3:30 p.m. EST
- Game weather: Cloudy • 43 °F (6 °C) • Wind 5 S/SE
- Game attendance: 105,286
- Referee: Dennis Lipski
- TV announcers (ABC): Brad Nessler, Bob Griese, and Lynn Swann
- Box Score

Game information

Purdue

- Kyle Orton
  27/47, 249 Yds
- Jerod Void
  22 Rush, 60 Yds, TD
- Taylor Stubblefield
  8 Rec, 78 Yds

Ohio St

- Craig Krenzel
  15/29, 226 Yds
- Lydell Ross
  23 Rush, 79 Yds
- Michael Jenkins
  6 Rec, 123 Yds

For the second time this year, ESPN College Gameday visited a contest involving Purdue, and with a chance to qualify for a share of the Big Ten title or an at-large BCS bowl game, the Boilermakers suffered a heartbreaking loss for the 2nd straight year to the #4 Ohio State Buckeyes, falling 16–13 to the Buckeyes in overtime.

As expected, the defenses largely controlled the game by keeping it low in points and high in punts. Purdue took its opening offensive drive 53 yards before settling for a Ben Jones FG. Late in the first quarter, the Buckeyes struck on a 58-yard pass from QB Craig Krenzel to WR Michael Jenkins to set up a 1st and goal. A controversial pass interference no-call resulted in a short FG for Buckeyes' all-time great kicker Mike Nugent to tie the game at 3. Purdue RB Jerod Void returned the ensuing kickoff near midfield, resulting in a short drive that ended with a long Jones FG to put Purdue back up 6–3. The Buckeyes slowly gained an edge in field position for the rest of the half, as they turned a short drive into a 52-yard Nugent FG to send the teams into the locker room tied at 6.

The game remained a field position battle for the better part of the 2nd half, as neither team's offense turned the ball over or scored any points. However, Purdue came up empty on an 86-yard drive when Ben Jones' FG attempt missed badly wide left.

Early in the 4th quarter Purdue faced a 3rd and long deep in their own territory. OSU defensive linemen Will Smith and Tim Anderson converged on QB Kyle Orton, forcing a fumble that DE Mike Kudla recovered for a touchdown that gave OSU a 13–6 lead. After a punt exchange, Purdue started a drive from their own 8-yard line with 6:36 to go and quickly faced another 3rd down and long yardage situation. Starting with a third down conversion pass to Anthony Chambers, Orton moved the Purdue offense over the next 5 plays to the OSU 11-yard line and then capped the impressive game-tying 92-yard drive with a well-executed Statue of Liberty touchdown run by RB Jerod Void.

After the Buckeyes' next drive ended just outside FG range, the OSU punt by B. J. Sander pinned Purdue inside their own 20-yard line for the seventh time in the game. With under 2 minutes left, the Boilermakers moved the ball to their 32-yard line, but then Orton mishandled the QB snap, resulting in a fumble that the Buckeyes recovered. OSU proceeded to run the clock down to 4 seconds on three running plays to set up Nugent's winning FG attempt. However, on the last play of regulation reserve LB Bobby Iwuchukwu (playing for the injured Gilbert Gardner) blocked the FG, keeping Purdue alive and sending the game to Overtime.

On Ohio State's overtime possession, the offense could not get a first down, but Nugent kicked a FG (partially blocked again by Iwuchukwu) to put the Buckeyes ahead 16–13. Needing a FG to tie or touchdown to win, Purdue gained a first down on an amazing effort by WR Taylor Stubblefield but could not advance further, bringing in Jones for a game-tying FG attempt. Unfortunately for Purdue, Jones missed the FG wide left, ending the game.

In defeat, Niko Koutouvides led the defense with 15 tackles and two pass defended.

Scoring summary

Quarter	Time	Drive			Team	Scoring information	Score	
Quarter	Time	Plays	Yards	TOP	Team	Scoring information	PUR	OSU
1	7:29	12	53	5:49	Purdue	45-yard field goal by Jones	3	0
2	14:50	10	79	4:27	Ohio St	26-yard field goal by Nugent	3	3
2	13:01	5	19	1:41	Purdue	47-yard field goal by Jones	6	3
2	2:42	5	2	1:19	Ohio St	52-yard field goal by Nugent	6	6
4	11:23				Ohio St	Fumble recovery in end zone for touchdown by Kudla, Nugent kick good	6	13
4	4:36	8	92	2:12	Purdue	Void 11-yard touchdown run, Jones kick good	13	13
OT		4	6		Ohio St	36-yard field goal by Nugent	13	16
"TOP" = time of possession. For other American football terms, see Glossary of American football.							13	16

=== Indiana ===
Team	1	2	3	4	Total
• Purdue	7	7	7	3	24
Indiana	3	0	10	3	16

- Date: November 22
- Location: Memorial Stadium, Bloomington, Indiana
- Game attendance: 41,404
- TV announcers (ESPN+): Craig Coshun (Play-by-play) & Marv Cook (Color)

Scoring summary
1	Purdue	Jerod Void 3-yard run (Ben Jones kick)	Purdue 7-0
1	Indiana	Bryan Robertson 39-yard field goal	Purdue 7-3
2	Purdue	John Standeford 41-yard pass from Kyle Orton (Ben Jones kick)	Purdue 14-3
3	Purdue	John Standeford 33-yard pass from Kyle Orton (Ben Jones kick)	Purdue 21-3
3	Indiana	BenJarvus Green-Ellis 39-yard run (Bryan Robertson kick)	Purdue 21-10
3	Indiana	Bryan Robertson 40-yard field goal	Purdue 21-13
4	Indiana	Bryan Robertson 22-yard field goal	Purdue 21-16
4	Purdue	Ben Jones 22-yard field goal	Purdue 24-16

Purdue finished a highly successful regular season at 9–3 to qualify for a New Year's Day bowl, but it was not without struggle against the lowly 2–10 Indiana Hoosiers. The Boilermakers made some uncharacteristic mistakes that turned a comfortable margin into a 5-point game, but then held on to get the 24–16 win.

Two of Purdue's senior stars – WR John Standeford (6–151, 2 touchdowns) and LB Landon Johnson – had big days and made key plays. The Hoosiers had turned a 21–3 deficit late in the 3rd quarter into a 21–16 margin early in the 4th quarter with a chance to take the lead by intercepting Kyle Orton twice. On the ensuing Hoosier drive after Orton's 2nd interception, LB Landon Johnson picked off Matt Lovecchio to end the IU threat. Purdue later added a Ben Jones FG, and then ran out the rest of the clock with the help of RB Jerod Void's best game of the season (31 carries, 141 yards).

In defeat, IU (and future Ole Miss and NFL) freshman RB BenJarvus Green-Ellis had a terrific day with 155 yards on the ground, becoming the first RB to gain over 100 yards on Purdue's stout 2003 defense.

=== Georgia ===
Team	1	2	3	4	OT	Total
• Georgia	14	10	0	3	7	34
Purdue	0	10	0	17	0	27

- Date: January 1
- Location: Florida Citrus Bowl, Orlando, Florida
- Game attendance: 64,565
- TV announcers (ABC): Gary Thorne (Play-by-play), David Norrie (Color) & Dr. Jerry Punch (Sideline)

In a game that mostly reversed the script of their previous meeting in the 2000 Outback Bowl, Purdue and Georgia played a game that featured a big early lead (Georgia 24–0) and a late rally to force overtime (tied at 27). However, like their 2000 meeting, Georgia emerged as the winner in a truly entertaining 34–27 game.

Needless to say, Purdue had a rough start. First, as was not typical in 2003, the Purdue defense – which was playing without seniors Jacques Reeves and Gilbert Gardner – got picked apart for the better part of the first half, as Georgia rolled up 24 points and almost 300 yards of offense led by the effective passing of QB David Greene to a talented receiving corps (that included WR Reggie Brown and TE Ben Watson). Meanwhile, the Purdue offense could not move against the ultra-athletic Georgia defense (30 total yards deep into the 2nd quarter). Making matters worse, Boilers starting QB Kyle Orton dislocated the thumb on his throwing hand on a David Pollack sack, removing him from the game as Purdue fell further behind.

In an amazing display of toughness and courage, Orton returned after only a few series, sparking the Purdue rally with 10 points late in the 2nd quarter. First, Orton capped a no-huddle drive with a 20-yard touchdown run to put Purdue on the board. Then on the first play of the ensuing UGA drive, Purdue forced and recovered a fumble, resulting in a Ben Jones FG.

The third quarter was mostly a field position battle with both defenses firmly in control, keeping the score 24–10.

Early in the fourth quarter, Orton completed passes on 4 consecutive plays to WR Taylor Stubblefield to move Purdue 60 yards to a first and goal situation. Orton ended the drive with his second touchdown run to make it a one possession game. But Greene and the Georgia offense responded with an efficient time-consuming drive that ended with a Billy Bennett FG for a 27–17 advantage with less than 5 minutes to go.

But the Boilers were far from finished. After an exchange of punts, Purdue started a drive with just over 2 minutes left with a terrific 60-yard pass from Orton to WR John Standeford, and then finished it with an Anthony Chambers touchdown catch to make the score 27–24.

Georgia recovered the ensuing onside kick, but then Bulldogs freshman RB Kregg Lumpkin marred an otherwise solid day (over 100 yards rushing) with a critical mistake on a clock-killing run: trying to make a cutback for more yardage, Lumpkin was stripped of the ball from behind by DE Shaun Phillips. Amidst a mad mob of players, LB Niko Koutouvides recovered the fumble at the UGA 35 to give Purdue new life. Although the Boilermakers could not score a touchdown, they did tie on a clutch 44-yard FG from Ben Jones to send the game to overtime.

Purdue won the OT coin toss and elected to go on defense first. Helped by a questionable end zone pass interference call, Georgia got a touchdown run from Lumpkin on a 4th and goal from the 1 – a gutsy call by UGA coach Mark Richt. Then Purdue could not score the necessary touchdown on their OT possession, which ended with an end zone interception on 4th down and goal.

Considering the combination of offense, defense, and special team talent, the 2003 Purdue Boilermakers were arguably Joe Tiller's best overall team in his tenure at Purdue, having concluded a highly successful campaign with a 9–4 record.

== 2004 NFL draft ==
Player	Position	Round	Pick	NFL club
Nick Hardwick	Center	2	66	San Diego Chargers
Stuart Schweigert	Safety	3	67	Oakland Raiders
Gilbert Gardner	Linebacker	3	69	Indianapolis Colts
Landon Johnson	Linebacker	3	96	Cincinnati Bengals
Shaun Phillips	Defensive end	4	98	San Diego Chargers
Niko Koutouvides	Linebacker	4	116	Seattle Seahawks
Kelly Butler	Offensive Line	6	172	Detroit Lions
Craig Terrill	Defensive tackle	6	189	Seattle Seahawks
Jacques Reeves	Cornerback	7	223	Dallas Cowboys

Purdue had 9 NFL Draft picks, just short of the school record of 10 in 1960.
