= 2004 Outback Bowl =

- 18th Outback Bowl
Iowa Hawkeyes	Florida Gators
(9–3)	(8–4)
Big Ten	SEC
37	17
Head coach: Kirk Ferentz	Head coach: Ron Zook
AP / Coaches / BCS; 13 / 12 / 13	AP / Coaches / BCS; 17 / 17 / 15
	1	2	3	4	Total
Iowa	7	13	14	3	37
Florida	7	0	3	7	17
- Date: January 1, 2004
- Season: 2003
- Stadium: Raymond James Stadium
- Location: Tampa, Florida
- MVP: Fred Russell (Iowa RB)
- Referee: Clair Gausman (Big 12)

United States TV coverage
- Network: ESPN
- Announcers: Mark Jones, Bob Davie, Holly Rowe

The 2004 Outback Bowl featured the Florida Gators and the Iowa Hawkeyes. It was the 18th edition of the Outback Bowl.

== Summary ==
Florida scored early in the game, with quarterback Chris Leak throwing a 70-yard touchdown pass to wide receiver Kelvin Kight to take a 7–0 lead. Iowa equalized following a 3-yard touchdown pass from quarterback Nathan Chandler to wide receiver Maurice Brown, knotting the score, 7–7.

Early in the second quarter, kicker Nate Kaeding made a 47-yard field goal, to give Iowa a 10–7 lead. Chandler later rushed 5 yards for a touchdown to extend the Hawkeyes' lead to 17–7. Before halftime, Kaeding connected on a 32-yard field goal to increase the lead to 20–7.

Early in the third quarter, Matt Melloy recovered a blocked punt in the end zone for an Iowa touchdown and a 27–7 lead. Florida kicked a 48-yard field goal to pull within 27–10. A Fred Russell touchdown run pushed Iowa's lead to 34–10. Kaeding later connected on his third field goal, this one from 38 yards, increasing the lead to 37–10. Chris Leak's 25-yard touchdown pass to Dallas Baker made the final margin 37–17.
