= Markus Curry =

American football player (born 1981)

No. 36
- Position: Cornerback

Personal information
- Born: April 7, 1981 (age 45); Detroit, Michigan, U.S.
- Listed height: 5 ft 11 in (1.80 m)
- Listed weight: 181 lb (82 kg)

Career information
- College: Michigan
- NFL draft: 2005: undrafted

Career history
- San Diego Chargers (2005–2006); San Francisco 49ers (2007-2008)*
- * Offseason or practice squad member only

Awards and highlights
- Second-team All-Big Ten (2004)
- Stats at Pro Football Reference

Markus Jamaine Curry (born April 7, 1981) is an American former professional football cornerback during the 2000s. He was originally signed by the San Diego Chargers as an undrafted free agent in 2005. While in college, he played at Michigan Wolverines football.

== Professional career ==
He entered the NFL as an undrafted free agent in 2005 with the San Diego Chargers. He spent the majority of the season on the practice squad. He was activated for one game after Terrence Kiel was placed on injured reserve. He was signed by the San Francisco 49ers in the 2007 offseason but was cut at the end of National Football League Training Camp. He was re-signed by the 49ers to their practice squad on November 27, 2007.
