= Kevin Mitchell (safety) =

American football player (born 1985)

Profile
- Position: Safety

Personal information
- Born: April 6, 1985 (age 41); Fort Wayne, Indiana
- Listed height: 6 ft 0 in (1.83 m)
- Listed weight: 209 lb (95 kg)

Career information
- College: Illinois
- NFL draft: 2008: undrafted

Career history
- Washington Redskins (2008)*
- * Offseason or practice squad member only

Kevin T. Mitchell (born April 6, 1985) is an American former football safety. Mitchell was signed by the Washington Redskins of the National Football League on April 29, 2008, but was released on May 6, 2008.

Kevin's father Stephen played football for the Indiana Hoosiers, his uncle Jon Hayes played football at Purdue University, and his brother Phil Hayes played for Arkansas.

== High school ==
Mitchell attended Homestead Senior High School in Fort Wayne, Indiana.

== College career ==
Kevin Mitchell majored in speech communications while at University of Illinois at Urbana-Champaign.

On the football field, Mitchell was a captain for the Illinois Fighting Illini Football, including Illinois' appearance in the 2008 Rose Bowl.

== NFL career ==
Mitchell went undrafted in the 2008 NFL draft, but on April 29, 2008, he signed with the Redskins. Washington later released him on May 6, 2008.

He is now the Varsity I Director at the University of Illinois.
