= Paris Hamilton =

American football player (born 1981)

No. 86
- Position: Wide receiver

Personal information
- Born: July 26, 1981 (age 45); Houston, Texas, U.S.
- Listed height: 6 ft 2 in (1.88 m)
- Listed weight: 190 lb (86 kg)

Career information
- High school: Jack Yates High School
- College: University of Minnesota

Career history
- 2005–2006: Detroit Lions*
- 2007: Minnesota Vikings*
- * Offseason or practice squad member only

Paris Hamilton (born July 26, 1981) is an American football player, a wide receiver, who attended the University of Minnesota.

== College career ==
Paris Hamilton joined the Minnesota Golden Gophers in 2003 but blew out his left knee in summer conditioning and missed the season. He had four catches for 198 yards and two touchdowns in 2004 . Hamilton played for Tyler (TX) Junior College prior to signing with Minnesota.

== Professional career ==
Hamilton was signed to the Detroit Lions during the 2005 season. He also played with them during the 2006 season. On June 13, 2007, Hamilton signed with the Minnesota Vikings but was placed on injury reserve after suffering a torn ACL. .
