= 2004 Peach Bowl =

The 2004 Peach Bowl may refer to:

- 2004 Peach Bowl (January), January 2, 2004 game between the Clemson Tigers and the Tennessee Volunteers
- 2004 Peach Bowl (December), December 31, 2004 game between the Florida Gators and the Miami Hurricanes
