= 2003 Pittsburgh Panthers football team =

American college football season

2003 Pittsburgh Panthers football

Continental Tire Bowl, L 16–23 vs. Virginia Cavaliers
- Conference: Big East Conference
- Record: 8–5 (5–2 Big East)
- Head coach: Walt Harris (7th season)
- Offensive coordinator: J. D. Brookhart (4th season)
- Offensive scheme: West Coast
- Defensive coordinator: Paul Rhoads (4th season)
- Base defense: Multiple 8-man front
- Home stadium: Heinz Field

2003 Big East Conference football standings
	Conf.			Overall
Team	W		L	W		L
No. 5 Miami (FL) $+	6	–	1	11	–	2
West Virginia +	6	–	1	8	–	5
Pittsburgh	5	–	2	8	–	5
Virginia Tech	4	–	3	8	–	5
Boston College	3	–	4	8	–	5
Syracuse	2	–	5	6	–	6
Rutgers	2	–	5	5	–	7
Temple	0	–	7	1	–	11
$ – BCS representative as conference champion; + – Conference co-champions; Rankings from AP Poll

The 2003 Pittsburgh Panthers football team represented the University of Pittsburgh in the 2003 NCAA Division I-A football season.

== Schedule ==
Date	Time	Opponent	Rank	Site	TV	Result	Attendance
September 6	7:00 p.m.	Kent State*	No. 10	Heinz Field; Pittsburgh, PA		W 43–3	56,531
September 13	12:30 p.m.	Ball State*	No. 11	Heinz Field; Pittsburgh, PA		W 42–21	44,117
September 20	7:00 p.m.	at Toledo*	No. 9	Glass Bowl; Toledo, OH		L 31–35	31,711
September 27	3:30 p.m.	at Texas A&M*	No. 17	Kyle Field; College Station, TX	ABC	W 37–26	79,116
October 11	6:00 p.m.	Notre Dame*	No. 15	Heinz Field; Pittsburgh, PA (rivalry)	ESPN	L 14–20	66,421
October 18	1:30 p.m.	at Rutgers		Rutgers Stadium; Piscataway, NJ		W 42–32	28,101
October 25	12:00 p.m.	Syracuse^{†}		Heinz Field; Pittsburgh, PA (rivalry)	ESPN+	W 34–14	61,421
November 1	1:00 p.m.	at Boston College	No. 25	Alumni Stadium; Chestnut Hill, MA		W 24–13	41,983
November 8	7:45 p.m.	No. 5 Virginia Tech	No. 25	Heinz Field; Pittsburgh, PA (College GameDay)	ESPN	W 31–28	66,207
November 15	7:00 p.m.	at West Virginia	No. 16	Mountaineer Field; Morgantown, WV (Backyard Brawl)	ESPN2	L 31–52	67,715
November 22	1:30 p.m.	at Temple	No. 21	Lincoln Financial Field; Philadelphia, PA		W 30–16	22,934
November 29	8:00 p.m.	No. 10 Miami (FL)	No. 20	Heinz Field; Pittsburgh, PA	ABC	L 14–28	60,486
December 27	11:00 a.m.	vs. Virginia*		Ericsson Stadium; Charlotte, NC (Continental Tire Bowl)	ESPN	L 16–23	51,236
*Non-conference game; ^{†}Homecoming; Rankings from AP Poll released prior to the game; All times are in Eastern time

== Roster ==
2003 Pittsburgh Panthers football team roster
Players
Coaches
Offense

Pos.	#	Name	Class
WR	8	Princell Brockenbrough	Sr
WR	1	Larry Fitzgerald	So
RB	25	Brandon Miree	Sr
OT	75	Matt Morgan	Sr
OL	53	Matt Parsons	Jr
OL	58	Joe Perri	Fr
QB	3	Tyler Palko	So
OL	78	Rob Petitti	Jr
RB	32	Lousaka Polite	Sr
WR	9	Ryan Regula	So
QB	12	Rod Rutherford	Sr
OL	71	Jon Schall	Sr
OL	66	Penny Semaia	Sr
WR	80	Marco Tinor	Sr
C	76	Neal Tracey	Fr
OL	64	Chris Vangas	Fr
OL	50	Joe Villani	So
TE	83	Kris Wilson	Sr
FB	30	Mark Yezovich	Fr
WR	24	Alex Zavackis	So

Defense

Pos.	#	Name	Class
DL	57	Andy Alleman	So
LB	44	Brian Bennett	So
LB	51	H. B. Blades	Fr
DB	22	Reggie Carter	So
DB	9	Josh Lay	So
LB	37	Chris McKillop	Fr
LB	30	Doug Roseberry	Jr
DL	88	Kyle Smith	Fr
DL	55	Thomas Smith	Jr
DL	56	Charles Spencer	Jr
DB	19	Shawntae Spencer	Sr
DL	94	Dan Stephens	Sr
DB	28	Mike Vranesevich	Fr

Special teams

Pos.	#	Name	Class
P	36	Andy Lee	Sr

Head coach

- Walt Harris

Coordinators/assistant coaches

Legend

- (C) Team captain
- (S) Suspended
- (I) Ineligible
- Injured
- Redshirt

Roster
Last update: 2003-12-12

== Coaching staff ==
2003 Pittsburgh Panthers football staff
Coaching staff: Walt Harris – Head coach; Bob Junko – Assistant head coach/defensive tackles; J.D. Brookhart – Offensive coordinator/wide receivers; Paul Rhoads – Defensive coordinator/secondary; Dino Babers – Running backs; Curtis Bray – Linebackers; Bryan Deal – Recruiting doordinator/Specialists/quarterbacks; Tom Freeman – Offensive line/run game coordinator; Bob Ligashesky – Tight ends/special teams; Charlie Partridge – Defensive ends	Support staff: Chris LaSala – Assistant Athletic Director/football operations; Matt Williamson – Recruiting Assistant; Scott McCurley – Graduate assistant; Ben McAdoo – Graduate assistant	Strength and conditioning staff: Dave Kennedy – Strength and conditioning coach; Dave Langworthy – Assistant strength and conditioning coach

== Awards and honors ==
- Larry Fitzgerald: Fred Biletnikoff Award, Walter Camp Award, Unanimous All-American

== Team Players drafted into the NFL ==
Player	Position	Round	Pick	NFL club
Larry Fitzgerald	Wide receiver	1	3	Arizona Cardinals
Shawntae Spencer	Defensive back	2	58	San Francisco 49ers
Kris Wilson	Tight end	2	61	Kansas City Chiefs
Claude Harriott	Defensive end	5	147	Chicago Bears
Andy Lee	Punter	6	188	San Francisco 49ers
Brandon Miree	Running back	7	247	Denver Broncos
