= 2003 Virginia Cavaliers football team =

American college football season

2003 Virginia Cavaliers football

Continental Tire Bowl champion

Continental Tire Bowl, W 23–16 vs. Pittsburgh
- Conference: Atlantic Coast Conference
- Record: 8–5 (4–4 ACC)
- Head coach: Al Groh (3rd season)
- Offensive coordinator: Ron Prince (1st season)
- Defensive coordinator: Al Golden (3rd season)
- Home stadium: Scott Stadium

2003 Atlantic Coast Conference football standings
| | Conf. | | | Overall |
| Team | W | | L | W | | L |
|---|---|---|---|---|---|---|
| No. 11 Florida State $ | 7 | – | 1 | 10 | – | 3 |
| No. 17 Maryland | 6 | – | 2 | 10 | – | 3 |
| No. 22 Clemson | 5 | – | 3 | 9 | – | 4 |
| NC State | 4 | – | 4 | 8 | – | 5 |
| Virginia | 4 | – | 4 | 8 | – | 5 |
| Georgia Tech | 4 | – | 4 | 7 | – | 6 |
| Wake Forest | 3 | – | 5 | 5 | – | 7 |
| Duke | 2 | – | 6 | 4 | – | 8 |
| North Carolina | 1 | – | 7 | 2 | – | 10 |
$ – BCS representative as conference champion; Rankings from AP Poll

The 2003 Virginia Cavaliers football team represented the University of Virginia as a member of the Atlantic Coast Conference (ACC) during the 2003 NCAA Division I-A football season. Led by third-year head coach Al Groh, the Cavaliers compiled an overall record of 8–5 with a mark of 4–4 in conference play, placing in a three-way tie for fourth in the ACC. Virginia was invited to the Continental Tire Bowl, where the Cavaliers defeated Pittsburgh. The team played home games at Scott Stadium in Charlottesville, Virginia.

== Schedule ==
| Date | Time | Opponent | Rank | Site | TV | Result | Attendance |
|---|---|---|---|---|---|---|---|
| August 30 | 7:00 pm | Duke | No. 18 | Scott Stadium; Charlottesville, VA | | W 27–0 | 61,737 |
| September 6 | 12:30 pm | at South Carolina* | No. 15 | Williams–Brice Stadium; Columbia, SC | JPS | L 7–31 | 80,150 |
| September 13 | 2:00 pm | at Western Michigan* | | Waldo Stadium; Kalamazoo, MI | | W 59–16 | 21,982 |
| September 27 | 3:30 pm | Wake Forest | | Scott Stadium; Charlottesville, VA | ABC | W 27–24 | 60,884 |
| October 4 | 1:30 pm | at North Carolina | | Kenan Memorial Stadium; Chapel Hill, NC (South's Oldest Rivalry) | | W 38–13 | 51,000 |
| October 11 | 12:00 pm | at Clemson | No. 25 | Memorial Stadium; Clemson, SC | JPS | L 27–30 ^{OT} | 76,774 |
| October 18 | 7:45 pm | No. 7 Florida State^{†} | | Scott Stadium; Charlottesville, VA (Jefferson–Eppes Trophy) | ESPN | L 14–19 | 62,875 |
| October 25 | 3:00 pm | Troy State* | | Scott Stadium; Charlottesville, VA | | W 24–0 | 57,580 |
| November 1 | 3:30 pm | at NC State | | Carter–Finley Stadium; Raleigh, NC | ABC | L 37–51 | 53,800 |
| November 13 | 7:45 pm | at Maryland | | Byrd Stadium; College Park, MD (rivalry) | ESPN | L 17–27 | 51,027 |
| November 22 | 12:00 pm | Georgia Tech | | Scott Stadium; Charlottesville, VA | JPS | W 29–17 | 58,526 |
| November 29 | 1:00 pm | No. 21 Virginia Tech* | | Scott Stadium; Charlottesville, VA (rivalry) | ABC | W 35–21 | 60,943 |
| December 27 | 12:00 pm | vs. Pittsburgh* | | Bank of America Stadium; Charlotte, NC (Continental Tire Bowl) | ESPN2 | W 23–16 | 51,236 |
*Non-conference game; ^{†}Homecoming; Rankings from AP Poll released prior to the game; All times are in Eastern time

== Personnel ==
=== Coaching staff ===
| Name | Position |
|---|---|
| Al Groh | Head coach |
| Danny Rocco | Assistant head coach / linebackers coach |
| Al Golden | Defensive coordinator |
| Ron Prince | Offensive coordinator / offensive line coach |
| Corwin Brown | Special teams coach |
| Mike Groh | Wide receivers / quarterbacks coach |
| Andy Heck | Tight ends coach |
| Mike London | Defensive line coach / recruiting coordinator |
| Bob Price | Defensive backs coach |
| Kevin Ross | Running backs coach |
| Anthony Poindexter | Graduate assistant coach – offense |
| Tim Whitney | Graduate assistant coach – defense |
| Evan Marcus | Head strength coach |

=== Roster ===
2003 Virginia Cavaliers football team roster
Players
Coaches
Offense

| Pos. | # | Name | Class |
|---|---|---|---|
| QB | 7 | Matt Schaub | Sr |
| QB | 11 | Christian Olsen | Fr |
| QB | 13 | Kevin McCabe | Fr |
| WR | 18 | Marques Hagans | So |
| OT | 61 | Elton Brown | Jr |
| OT | 66 | D'Brickashaw Ferguson | So |
| OT | 69 | Brad Butler | So |
| OL | 77 | Ian-Yates Cunningham | Fr |
| OT | 79 | Gordie Sammis | Fr |
| FB | 86 | Kase Luzar | Sr |
| TE | 89 | Heath Miller | Jr |

Defense

| Pos. | # | Name | Class |
|---|---|---|---|
| LB | 56 | Darryl Blackstock | So |
| DT | 95 | Chris Canty | Jr |

Special teams

| Pos. | # | Name | Class |

Head coach

- Al Groh

Coordinators/assistant coaches

Legend

- (C) Team captain
- (S) Suspended
- (I) Ineligible
- Injured
- Redshirt

Roster
