= 2003 Temple Owls football team =

American college football season

2003 Temple Owls football
- Conference: Big East Conference
- Record: 1–11 (0–7 Big East)
- Head coach: Bobby Wallace (6th season)
- Offensive coordinator: Dave Brock (2nd season)
- Defensive coordinator: Raymond Monica (6th season)
- Home stadium: Lincoln Financial Field

2003 Big East Conference football standings
	Conf.			Overall
Team	W		L	W		L
No. 5 Miami (FL) $+	6	–	1	11	–	2
West Virginia +	6	–	1	8	–	5
Pittsburgh	5	–	2	8	–	5
Virginia Tech	4	–	3	8	–	5
Boston College	3	–	4	8	–	5
Syracuse	2	–	5	6	–	6
Rutgers	2	–	5	5	–	7
Temple	0	–	7	1	–	11
$ – BCS representative as conference champion; + – Conference co-champions; Rankings from AP Poll

The 2003 Temple Owls football team represented Temple University as a member of the Big East Conference during the 2003 NCAA Division I-A football season. Led by sixth-year head coach Bobby Wallace, the Owls compiled an overall record of 1–11 with a mark of 0–7 in conference play, placing last out of eight teams in the Big East. Temple played home games at the newly completed Lincoln Financial Field in Philadelphia.

== Schedule ==
Date	Time	Opponent	Site	TV	Result	Attendance
August 30	3:30 pm	at Penn State*	Beaver Stadium; University Park, PA	ESPN Plus	L 10–23	101,553
September 6	4:00 pm	Villanova*	Lincoln Financial Field; Philadelphia, PA (Mayor's Cup)		L 20–23 ^{2OT}	30,090
September 20	7:00 pm	at Cincinnati*	Nippert Stadium; Cincinnati, OH		L 24–30 ^{3OT}	30,405
September 27	3:00 pm	at Louisville*	Papa John's Cardinal Stadium; Louisville, KY		L 12–21	38,489
October 4	7:00 pm	at Middle Tennessee*	Johnny "Red" Floyd Stadium; Murfreesboro, TN		W 44–36	13,829
October 11	3:30 pm	Boston College^{†}	Lincoln Financial Field; Philadelphia, PA	ESPN Plus	L 13–38	21,862
October 18	12:00 pm	at No. 2 Miami (FL)	Miami Orange Bowl; Miami, FL	ESPN Plus	L 14–52	49,144
October 25	1:00 pm	Rutgers	Lincoln Financial Field; Philadelphia, PA		L 14–30	18,376
November 8	1:30 pm	at Syracuse	Carrier Dome; Syracuse, NY		L 17–41	43,149
November 15	1:00 pm	No. 12 Virginia Tech	Lincoln Financial Field; Philadelphia, PA		L 23–24 ^{OT}	27,425
November 22	1:00 pm	No. 21 Pittsburgh	Lincoln Financial Field; Philadelphia, PA		L 16–30	22,934
November 29	1:00 pm	at No. 24 West Virginia	Mountaineer Field; Morgantown, WV		L 28–45	35,942
*Non-conference game; ^{†}Homecoming; Rankings from AP Poll released prior to the game; All times are in Eastern time
