= 2003 Tangerine Bowl =

American college football game

2003 Mazda Tangerine Bowl
NC State Wolfpack	Kansas Jayhawks
(7–5)	(6–6)
ACC	Big 12
56	26
Head coach: Chuck Amato	Head coach: Mark Mangino
	1	2	3	4	Total
NC State	21	7	14	14	56
Kansas	7	3	10	6	26
- Date: December 22, 2003
- Season: 2003
- Stadium: Florida Citrus Bowl
- Location: Orlando, Florida
- MVP: QB Philip Rivers (NC State)
- Referee: Paul Labenne (WAC)
- Attendance: 26,482

United States TV coverage
- Network: ESPN
- Announcers: Mike Tirico (Play by Play); Lee Corso (Analyst); Kirk Herbstreit (Analyst); Dr. Jerry Punch (Sideline)

The 2003 Tangerine Bowl was the 14th edition of the college football bowl game and was played on December 22, 2003, featuring the NC State Wolfpack, and the Kansas Jayhawks. This was the third and last under the Tangerine Bowl name as Champs Sports took over naming rights starting in 2004.

== Background ==
The Jayhawks were making their first bowl game appearance since 1995. NC State was making their seventh bowl game in nine years.

== Game summary ==
NC State started the scoring with a 45-yard touchdown pass from Philip Rivers to Richard Washington, to give NC State a 7-0 lead. Bill Whittemore threw a 23-yard touchdown pass to Charles Gordon to tie the game at 7. Later in the first quarter, Philip Rivers threw a 14-yard touchdown pass to Washington, and NC State reclaimed the lead at 14-7. T.A. McLendon scored on a 1-yard touchdown run to increase NC State's lead to 21-7.

In the second quarter, John Beck hit a 28-yard field goal to get Kansas to within 21-10. Philip Rivers threw a 3-yard touchdown pass to T.A. McLendon, to give NC State a 28-10 halftime lead. In the third quarter, Whittemore hit Gordon on an 11-yard touchdown pass making it 28-17. NC State answered with a 40-yard touchdown pass from Rivers to Brian Clark, making the lead 35-17.

Reggie Davis scored on a 10-yard touchdown run increasing State's lead to 42-17. John Beck kicked a 39-yard field goal for Kansas making the score 35-20. Bill Whittemore then scored on a 9-yard touchdown run, making the score 42-26. NC State scored the final two touchdowns of the game making the final margin 56-26.

- North Carolina State - Richard Washington 45 yard touchdown pass from Philip Rivers (A. Kiker kick)
- Kansas - Charles Gordon 23 yard touchdown pass from B. Whittemore (J. Brooks kick)
- North Carolina State - Richard Washington 14 yard touchdown pass from Philip Rivers (A. Kiker kick)
- North Carolina State - T.A. McLendon 1 yard touchdown run (A. Kiker kick)
- Kansas - J. Brooks 28 yard field goal
- North Carolina State - T.A. McLendon 3 yard touchdown pass from Philip Rivers (A. Kiker kick)
- Kansas - Clark Green 11 yard touchdown pass from B. Whittemore (J. Brooks kick)
- North Carolina State - Brian Clark 40 yard touchdown pass from Philip Rivers (A. Kiker kick)
- North Carolina State - Reggie Davis 10 yard touchdown run (A. Kiker kick)
- Kansas - John Beck 39 yard field goal
- Kansas - Bill Whittemore 9 yard touchdown run (two-point conversion failed)
- North Carolina State - Jerricho Cotchery 21 yard touchdown pass from Philip Rivers (A. Kiker kick)
- North Carolina State - T.A. McLendon 26 yard touchdown run (A. Kiker kick)

Quarterback Philip Rivers went 37-of-45 for 475 yards and five touchdowns to lead the Wolfpack to a swift win, with a 28-10 halftime lead that exploded in the second half.
