= 2003 Rutgers Scarlet Knights football team =

American college football season

2003 Rutgers Scarlet Knights football
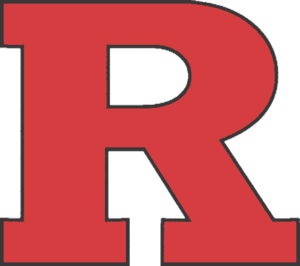
- Conference: Big East Conference
- Record: 5–7 (2–5 Big East)
- Head coach: Greg Schiano (3rd season)
- Offensive coordinator: Craig Ver Steeg (1st season)
- Offensive scheme: Pro-style
- Defensive coordinator: Paul Ferraro (3rd season)
- Base defense: 4–3
- Home stadium: Rutgers Stadium

2003 Big East Conference football standings
	Conf.			Overall
Team	W		L	W		L
No. 5 Miami (FL) $+	6	–	1	11	–	2
West Virginia +	6	–	1	8	–	5
Pittsburgh	5	–	2	8	–	5
Virginia Tech	4	–	3	8	–	5
Boston College	3	–	4	8	–	5
Syracuse	2	–	5	6	–	6
Rutgers	2	–	5	5	–	7
Temple	0	–	7	1	–	11
$ – BCS representative as conference champion; + – Conference co-champions; Rankings from AP Poll

The 2003 Rutgers Scarlet Knights football team represented Rutgers University in the 2003 NCAA Division I FBS football season. The Scarlet Knights were led by third-year head coach Greg Schiano and played their home games at Rutgers Stadium. They are a member of the Big East Conference. They finished the season 5–7, 2–5 in Big East play to finish in a tie with Syracuse for 6th place.

== Schedule ==
Date	Time	Opponent	Site	TV	Result	Attendance
August 30	7:00 pm	Buffalo*	Rutgers Stadium; Piscataway, NJ		W 24–10	25,011
September 6	3:40 pm	at Michigan State*	Spartan Stadium; East Lansing, MI	ESPN Plus	L 28–44	72,579
September 13	3:30 pm	at Army*	Michie Stadium; West Point, NY	ESPN Plus	W 36–21	30,035
September 27	7:00 pm	Navy*	Rutgers Stadium; Piscataway, NJ	ESPN Plus	W 48–27	32,382
October 4	12:00 pm	No. 4 Virginia Tech	Rutgers Stadium; Piscataway, NJ	ESPN Plus	L 22–48	28,956
October 11	12:00 pm	at West Virginia	Mountaineer Field; Morgantown, WV	ESPN Plus	L 19–34	50,896
October 18	1:30 pm	Pittsburgh^{†}	Rutgers Stadium; Piscataway, NJ		L 32–42	28,101
October 25	1:00 pm	at Temple	Lincoln Financial Field; Philadelphia, PA		W 30–14	18,376
November 8	12:00 pm	at Connecticut*	Rentschler Field; East Hartford, CT	ESPN Plus	L 31–38	40,000
November 15	3:30 pm	Boston College	Rutgers Stadium; Piscataway, NJ	ESPN Plus	L 25–35	31,019
November 22	12:00 pm	at No. 13 Miami (FL)	Miami Orange Bowl; Miami, FL	ESPN Plus	L 10–34	39,572
November 29	12:00 pm	Syracuse	Rutgers Stadium; Piscataway, NJ		W 24–7	18,563
*Non-conference game; ^{†}Homecoming; Rankings from AP Poll released prior to the game; All times are in Eastern time

== Roster ==
2003 Rutgers Scarlet Knights football team roster
Players			Coaches
Offense: Pos. / # / Name / Class; FB / 15 / Brian Leonard / Fr	Defense: Pos. / # / Name / Class	Special teams: Pos. / # / Name / Class	Head coach: Greg Schiano; Coordinators/assistant coaches Legend: (C) Team captain; (S) Suspended; (I) Ineligible; Injured; Redshirt; Roster
