= 2003 Wake Forest Demon Deacons football team =

American college football season

2003 Wake Forest Demon Deacons football
- Conference: Atlantic Coast Conference
- Record: 5–7 (3–5 ACC)
- Head coach: Jim Grobe (3rd season)
- Offensive coordinator: Steed Lobotzke (1st season)
- Offensive scheme: Spread
- Defensive coordinator: Dean Hood (3rd season)
- Base defense: 4–3
- Captain: Game captains
- Home stadium: Groves Stadium

2003 Atlantic Coast Conference football standings
	Conf.			Overall
Team	W		L	W		L
No. 11 Florida State $	7	–	1	10	–	3
No. 17 Maryland	6	–	2	10	–	3
No. 22 Clemson	5	–	3	9	–	4
NC State	4	–	4	8	–	5
Virginia	4	–	4	8	–	5
Georgia Tech	4	–	4	7	–	6
Wake Forest	3	–	5	5	–	7
Duke	2	–	6	4	–	8
North Carolina	1	–	7	2	–	10
$ – BCS representative as conference champion; Rankings from AP Poll

The 2003 Wake Forest Demon Deacons football team was an American football team that represented Wake Forest University as a member of the Atlantic Coast Conference (ACC) during the 2003 NCAA Division I-A football season. In their third season under head coach Jim Grobe, the Demon Deacons compiled a 5–7 record, were outscored by a total of 347 to 334, and finished in seventh place in the ACC.

The team's statistical leaders included Cory Randolph (1,773 passing yards), Chris Barclay (1,192 rushing yards, 72 points scored), and Jason Anderson (751 receiving yards).

The team played its home games at Groves Stadium in Winston-Salem, North Carolina.

== Schedule ==
Date	Time	Opponent	Rank	Site	TV	Result	Attendance	Source
August 30	1:00 pm	at Boston College*		Alumni Stadium; Chestnut Hill, MA		W 32–28	42,563	
September 6	12:00 pm	No. 14 NC State		Groves Stadium; Winston-Salem, NC (rivalry)	ABC	W 38–24	35,741	
September 13	12:00 pm	Purdue*	No. 20	Groves Stadium; Winston-Salem, NC	ESPN	L 10–16	29,853	
September 20	6:30 pm	East Carolina*		Groves Stadium; Winston-Salem, NC		W 34–16	28,074	
September 27	3:30 pm	at Virginia		Scott Stadium; Charlottesville, VA	ABC	L 24–27	60,884	
October 11	3:30 pm	Georgia Tech^{†}		Groves Stadium; Winston-Salem, NC		L 7–24	27,382	
October 18	12:00 pm	at Duke		Wallace Wade Stadium; Durham, NC (rivalry)	JPS	W 42–13	17,314	
October 25	3:30 pm	at No. 6 Florida State		Doak Campbell Stadium; Tallahassee, FL	ABC	L 24–48	82,393	
November 1	3:30 pm	Clemson		Groves Stadium; Winston-Salem, NC		W 45–17	35,643	
November 8	12:00 pm	at North Carolina		Kenan Memorial Stadium; Chapel Hill, NC (rivalry)	JPS	L 34–42	35,000	
November 15	3:30 pm	Connecticut*		Groves Stadium; Winston-Salem, NC		L 17–51	22,435	
November 29	3:30 pm	Maryland		Groves Stadium; Winston-Salem, NC	ESPN	L 28–41	18,783	
*Non-conference game; ^{†}Homecoming; Rankings from AP Poll released prior to the game; All times are in Eastern time

== Team leaders ==
Category	Team Leader	Att/Cth	Yds
Passing	Cory Randolph	144/246	1,773
Rushing	Chris Barclay	235	1,192
Receiving	Jason Anderson	44	751
