= 2003 BYU Cougars football team =

American college football season

2003 BYU Cougars football
- Conference: Mountain West Conference
- Record: 4–8 (3–4 MW)
- Head coach: Gary Crowton (3rd season)
- Co-offensive coordinators: Robbie Bosco (1st season); Todd Bradford (1st season)
- Offensive scheme: Spread
- Defensive coordinator: Bronco Mendenhall (1st season)
- Base defense: 3–3–5
- Home stadium: LaVell Edwards Stadium

2003 Mountain West Conference football standings
| | Conf. | | | Overall |
| Team | W | | L | W | | L |
|---|---|---|---|---|---|---|
| No. 21 Utah $ | 6 | – | 1 | 10 | – | 2 |
| New Mexico | 5 | – | 2 | 8 | – | 5 |
| Colorado State | 4 | – | 3 | 7 | – | 6 |
| Air Force | 3 | – | 4 | 7 | – | 5 |
| San Diego State | 3 | – | 4 | 6 | – | 6 |
| BYU | 3 | – | 4 | 4 | – | 8 |
| UNLV | 2 | – | 5 | 6 | – | 6 |
| Wyoming | 2 | – | 5 | 4 | – | 8 |
$ – Conference champion; Rankings from AP Poll

The 2003 BYU Cougars football team represented Brigham Young University during the 2003 NCAA Division I-A football season.

== Schedule ==
| Date | Time | Opponent | Site | TV | Result | Attendance |
|---|---|---|---|---|---|---|
| August 28 | 7:30 pm | Georgia Tech* | LaVell Edwards Stadium; Provo, UT | ESPN2 | W 24–13 | 61,930 |
| September 6 | 5:00 pm | at No. 4 USC* | Los Angeles Memorial Coliseum; Los Angeles, CA | ABC | L 18–35 | 75,315 |
| September 13 | 6:00 pm | at New Mexico | University Stadium; Albuquerque, NM | SWP | W 10–7 | 33,606 |
| September 20 | 4:30 pm | Stanford* | LaVell Edwards Stadium; Provo, UT | SWP | L 14–18 | 61,446 |
| September 27 | 1:00 pm | Air Force | LaVell Edwards Stadium; Provo, UT | ESPN+ | L 10–24 | 62,210 |
| October 4 | 8:00 pm | at San Diego State | Qualcomm Stadium; San Diego, CA | SWP | W 44–36 | 32,137 |
| October 9 | 8:00 pm | Colorado State | LaVell Edwards Stadium; Provo, UT | ESPN2 | L 13–58 | 58,377 |
| October 18 | 4:00 pm | at Wyoming | War Memorial Stadium; Laramie, WY | SWP | L 10–13 | 22,797 |
| October 25 | 5:00 pm | at UNLV | Sam Boyd Stadium; Las Vegas, NV | ABC | W 27–20 ^{OT} | 30,084 |
| October 30 | 5:30 pm | Boise State* | LaVell Edwards Stadium; Provo, UT | ESPN | L 12–50 | 60,554 |
| November 15 | 12:30 pm | at Notre Dame* | Notre Dame Stadium; Notre Dame, IN | NBC | L 14–33 | 80,795 |
| November 22 | 1:00 pm | Utah | LaVell Edwards Stadium; Provo, UT (Holy War) | ESPN+ | L 0–3 | 64,486 |
*Non-conference game; Rankings from AP Poll released prior to the game

•SportsWest Productions (SWP) games were shown locally on KSL 5.

== Roster ==
2003 BYU Cougars football team roster
Players
Coaches
Offense

| Pos. | # | Name | Class |
|---|---|---|---|
| QB | 8 | Matt Berry | Fr |
| WR | 2 | David Christensen | Sr |
| WR | 80 | Tody Christensen | Sr |
| OL | 64 | Scott Jackson | Sr |
| G | 75 | Scott Young | Sr |

Defense

| Pos. | # | Name | Class |
|---|---|---|---|
| LB | 46 | Colby Bockwoldt | Sr |
| DE | 92 | John Denney | Jr |
| SS | 33 | Aaron Francisco | Jr |
| DL | 56 | Shaun Nua | Jr |
| LB | 49 | Brady Poppinga | Jr |

Special teams

| Pos. | # | Name | Class |

Head coach

- Gary Crowton

Coordinators/assistant coaches

Legend

- (C) Team captain
- (S) Suspended
- (I) Ineligible
- Injured
- Redshirt

Roster

== BYU Cougars Radio Network ==
The BYU Cougars radio network carried every game on radio using the broadcast trio of Greg Wrubell (pxp), Marc Lyons (analyst), and Bill Riley (sidelines). KSL 1160 AM served as the flagship station for BYU Football.

== Game summaries ==
=== Georgia Tech ===
| Team | 1 | 2 | 3 | 4 | Total |
|---|---|---|---|---|---|
| Georgia Tech | 6 | 7 | 0 | 0 | 13 |
| • BYU | 7 | 0 | 14 | 3 | 24 |

- Date: August 28
- Location: LaVell Edwards Stadium, Provo, UT
- Game start: 7:37 p.m. MST
- Elapsed time: 3:17
- Game attendance: 61,930
- Game weather: Clear, 89 °F (32 °C), wind W 5 mph (8.0 km/h)
- Referee: Joe Rider
- TV announcers (ESPN2/Westwood One): Mark Malone, Mike Gottfried, Alex Flanagan (ESPN2)
  Bob Papa, Shea Walker (Westwood One)

Scoring summary
| 1 | 8:49 | GT | Dan Burnett 26-yard field goal | GT 3-0 |
| 1 | 5:07 | BYU | Daniel Coates 38-yard pass from Matt Berry (Matt Payne kick) | BYU 7-3 |
| 1 | 2:40 | GT | Dan Burnett 39-yard field goal | BYU 7-6 |
| 2 | 10:50 | GT | Nathan Burton 18-yard blocked punt return (Dan Burnett kick) | GT 13-7 |
| 3 | 11:12 | BYU | Daniel Coates 15-yard pass from Matt Berry (Matt Payne kick) | BYU 14-13 |
| 3 | 5:55 | BYU | Tody Christensen 14-yard pass from Matt Berry (Matt Payne kick) | BYU 21-13 |
| 4 | 2:32 | BYU | Matt Payne 24-yard field goal | BYU 24-13 |

=== USC ===
| Team | 1 | 2 | 3 | 4 | Total |
|---|---|---|---|---|---|
| BYU | 0 | 5 | 7 | 6 | 18 |
| • #4/8 USC | 21 | 0 | 0 | 14 | 35 |

- Date: September 6
- Location: Los Angeles Memorial Coliseum, Los Angeles, CA
- Game start: 5:08 p.m. PST
- Elapsed time: 3:21
- Game attendance: 75,315
- Game weather: Sunny, 84 °F (29 °C), wind 6 mph (9.7 km/h)
- Referee: David Cutaia
- TV announcers (ABC): Keith Jackson, Dan Fouts, Todd Harris

Scoring summary
| 1 | 10:02 | USC | Mike Williams 1-yard pass from Matt Leinart (Ryan Killeen kick) | USC 7-0 |
| 1 | 2:43 | USC | Keary Colbert 48-yard pass from Matt Leinart (Ryan Killeen kick) | USC 14-0 |
| 1 | 2:34 | USC | Omar Nazel 16-yard interception return (Ryan Killeen kick) | USC 21-0 |
| 2 | 2:51 | BYU | K.C. Bills safety | USC 21-2 |
| 2 | 0:00 | BYU | Matt Payne 53-yard field goal | USC 21-5 |
| 3 | 11:51 | BYU | Daniel Coates 14-yard pass from Matt Berry (Matt Payne kick) | USC 21-12 |
| 4 | 14:03 | BYU | Matt Payne 26-yard field goal | USC 21-15 |
| 4 | 7:05 | BYU | Matt Payne 52-yard field goal | USC 21-18 |
| 4 | 4:11 | USC | Mike Williams 18-yard pass from Matt Leinart (Ryan Killeen kick) | USC 28-18 |
| 4 | 1:40 | USC | Hershel Dennis 11-yard run (Ryan Killeen kick) | USC 35-18 |

=== New Mexico ===
| Team | 1 | 2 | 3 | 4 | Total |
|---|---|---|---|---|---|
| • BYU | 3 | 7 | 0 | 0 | 10 |
| New Mexico | 0 | 0 | 7 | 0 | 7 |

- Date: September 13
- Location: University Stadium, Albuquerque, NM
- Game start: 6:05 p.m. MST
- Elapsed time: 3:15
- Game attendance: 33,606
- Game weather: 74 °F (23 °C), clear and windy, winds E 20 mph (32 km/h)
- Referee: Karl Richins
- TV announcers (SportsWest): Tom Kirkland, Blaine Fowler

Scoring summary
| 1 | 7:17 | BYU | Matt Payne 20-yard field goal | BYU 3-0 |
| 2 | 6:00 | BYU | Phillip Niu 29-yard pass from Matt Berry (Matt Payne kick) | BYU 10-0 |
| 3 | 4:38 | UNM | DonTrell Moore 3-yard run (Wes Zunker kick) | BYU 10-7 |

=== Stanford ===
| Team | 1 | 2 | 3 | 4 | Total |
|---|---|---|---|---|---|
| • Stanford | 6 | 0 | 3 | 9 | 18 |
| BYU | 7 | 0 | 7 | 0 | 14 |

- Date: September 20
- Location: LaVell Edwards Stadium, Provo, UT
- Game start: 4:35 p.m. MST
- Elapsed time: 3:20
- Game attendance: 61,446
- Game weather: Clear, 77 °F (25 °C), wind NW 5–10 mph (8.0–16.1 km/h)
- Referee: Gerald Wright
- TV announcers (SportsWest): Tom Kirkland, Blaine Fowler

Scoring summary
| 1 | 4:33 | BYU | Tody Christensen 27-yard pass from John Beck (Matt Payne kick) | GT 7-0 |
| 1 | 1:54 | STAN | Kenneth Tolon 4-yard run (kick blocked) | BYU 7-6 |
| 3 | 9:14 | STAN | Michael Sgori 38-yard field goal | STAN 9-7 |
| 3 | 0:10 | BYU | Daniel Coates 31-yrd pass from Lance Pendleton (Matt Payne kick) | BYU 14-9 |
| 4 | 11:12 | STAN | Michael Sgori 24-yard field goal | BYU 14-12 |
| 4 | 3:51 | STAN | Trent Edwards 14-yard run (pass failed) | STAN 18-14 |

=== Air Force ===
| Team | 1 | 2 | 3 | 4 | Total |
|---|---|---|---|---|---|
| • Air Force | 0 | 3 | 7 | 14 | 24 |
| BYU | 3 | 0 | 7 | 0 | 10 |

- Date: September 27
- Location: LaVell Edwards Stadium, Provo, UT
- Game start: 1:05 p.m. MST
- Elapsed time: 3:08
- Game attendance: 62,210
- Game weather: Clear, 77 °F (25 °C), wind WSW 5 mph (8.0 km/h)
- Referee: Karl Richins
- TV announcers (ESPN+): Gary Bender, J.C. Pearson, Anne Marie Anderson

Scoring summary
| 1 | 3:38 | BYU | Matt Payne 38-yard field goal | BYU 3-0 |
| 2 | 5:46 | AFA | Joey Ashcroft 30-yard field goal | TIED 3-3 |
| 3 | 8:13 | AFA | Chance Harridge 8-yard run (Joey Ashcroft kick) | AFA 10-3 |
| 3 | 3:02 | BYU | Phillip Niu 25-yard pass from John Beck (Matt Payne kick) | TIED 10-10 |
| 4 | 8:05 | AFA | J.P. Waller 30-yard pass from Chance Harridge (Joey Ashcroft kick) | AFA 17-10 |
| 4 | 0:00 | AFA | Chance Harridge 1-yard run (Joey Ashcroft kick) | AFA 24-10 |

=== San Diego State ===
| Team | 1 | 2 | 3 | 4 | Total |
|---|---|---|---|---|---|
| • BYU | 7 | 24 | 10 | 3 | 44 |
| San Diego State | 14 | 10 | 6 | 6 | 36 |

- Date: October 4
- Location: Qualcomm Stadium, San Diego, CA
- Game start: 7:07 p.m. PST
- Elapsed time: 3:30
- Game attendance: 32,137
- Game weather: 63 °F (17 °C), clear and windy, winds W 4 mph (6.4 km/h)
- Referee: Terry Leyden
- TV announcers (SportsWest): Tom Kirkland, Blaine Fowler

Scoring summary
| 1 | 14:06 | SDSU | Brook Miller 44-yard fumble return (J.C. Mejia kick) | SDSU 7-0 |
| 1 | 3:56 | BYU | John Beck 4-yard run (Matt Payne kick) | TIED 7-7 |
| 1 | 3:40 | SDSU | Jeff Webb 70-yard pass from Adam Hall (J.C. Mejia kick) | SDSU 14-7 |
| 2 | 14:11 | BYU | Naufahu Tahi 35-yard pass from John Beck (Matt Payne kick) | TIED 14-14 |
| 2 | 7:40 | BYU | Rey Brathwaite 95-yard run (Matt Payne kick) | BYU 21-14 |
| 2 | 4:11 | SDSU | Jeff Webb 24-yard pass from Adam Hall (J.C. Mejia kick) | TIED 21-21 |
| 2 | 1:36 | BYU | Matt Payne 39-yard field goal | BYU 24-21 |
| 2 | 1:06 | BYU | Colby Bockwoldt 13-yard fumble return (Matt Payne kick) | BYU 31-21 |
| 2 | 0:00 | SDSU | J.C. Mejia 39-yard field goal | BYU 31-24 |
| 3 | 10:43 | BYU | Naufahu Tahi 8-yard pass from John Beck (Matt Payne kick) | BYU 38-24 |
| 3 | 7:12 | BYU | Matt Payne 47-yard field goal | BYU 41-24 |
| 3 | 2:18 | SDSU | Jeff Webb 55-yard pass from Adam Hall (Devin Pitts pass failed) | BYU 41-30 |
| 4 | 9:05 | SDSU | Alohaii Leolofi 24-yard fumble return (Lynel Hamilton rush failed) | BYU 41-36 |
| 4 | 2:18 | BYU | Matt Payne 18-yard field goal | BYU 44-36 |

=== Colorado State ===
| Team | 1 | 2 | 3 | 4 | Total |
|---|---|---|---|---|---|
| • Colorado State | 21 | 20 | 10 | 7 | 58 |
| BYU | 3 | 10 | 0 | 0 | 13 |

- Date: October 9
- Location: LaVell Edwards Stadium, Provo, UT
- Game start: 8:04 p.m. MST
- Elapsed time: 3:13
- Game attendance: 58,377
- Game weather: Clear, 78 °F (26 °C), wind S 4 mph (6.4 km/h)
- Referee: Ken Flaherty
- TV announcers (ESPN2/Westwood One): Gary Bender, Craig James, Holly Rowe (ESPN2)
  Bob Papa, Shea Walker (Westwood One)

Scoring summary
| 1 | 11:50 | CSU | Eric Hill 39-yard pass from Bradlee Van Pelt (Jeff Babcock kick) | CSU 7-0 |
| 1 | 7:12 | CSU | Marcus Houston 4-yard run (Jeff Babcock kick) | CSU 14-0 |
| 1 | 3:39 | BYU | Matt Payne 24-yard field goal | CSU 14-3 |
| 1 | 2:15 | CSU | Matt Bartz 59-yard pass from Bradlee Van Pelt (Jeff Babcock kick) | CSU 21-3 |
| 2 | 12:08 | BYU | Justin Jory 9-yard pass from John Beck (Matt Payne kick) | CSU 21-10 |
| 2 | 10:02 | CSU | Patrick Goodpaster 16-yard fumble return (kick failed) | CSU 27-10 |
| 2 | 7:23 | BYU | Matt Payne 20-yard field goal | CSU 27-13 |
| 2 | 4:32 | CSU | Eric Hill 25-yard pass from Bradlee Van Pelt (Jeff Babcock kick) | CSU 34-13 |
| 2 | 3:37 | CSU | Marcus Houston 1-yard run (Jeff Babcock kick) | CSU 41-13 |
| 3 | 8:02 | CSU | Marcus Houston 2-yard run (Jeff Babcock kick) | CSU 48-13 |
| 3 | 1:05 | CSU | Jeff Babcock 38-yard field goal | CSU 51-13 |
| 4 | 9:04 | CSU | Jimmy Green 7-yard run (Jeff Babcock kick) | CSU 58-13 |

=== Wyoming ===
| Team | 1 | 2 | 3 | 4 | Total |
|---|---|---|---|---|---|
| BYU | 0 | 0 | 3 | 7 | 10 |
| • Wyoming | 3 | 10 | 0 | 0 | 13 |

- Date: October 18
- Location: War Memorial Stadium, Laramie, WY
- Game start: 4:00 p.m. MST
- Elapsed time: 3:14
- Game attendance: 22,797
- Game weather: 74 °F (23 °C), Sunny
- Referee: Gerald Wright
- TV announcers (SportsWest): Tom Kirkland, Blaine Fowler

Scoring summary
| 1 | 11:14 | WY | Deric Yaussi 42-yard field goal | WY 3-0 |
| 2 | 12:27 | WY | Deric Yaussi 43-yard field goal | WY 6-0 |
| 2 | 6:39 | WY | Tyler Gottschalk 60-yard interception return (Deric Yaussi kick) | WY 13-0 |
| 3 | 4:53 | BYU | Matt Payne 30-yard field goal | WY 13-3 |
| 4 | 5:53 | BYU | Naufahu Tahi 2-yard run (Matt Payne kick) | WY 13-10 |

=== UNLV ===
| Team | 1 | 2 | 3 | 4 | OT | Total |
|---|---|---|---|---|---|---|
| • BYU | 0 | 13 | 0 | 7 | 7 | 27 |
| UNLV | 6 | 7 | 0 | 7 | 0 | 20 |

- Date: October 25
- Location: Sam Boyd Stadium, Las Vegas, NV
- Game start: 4:05 p.m. PST
- Elapsed time: 3:33
- Game attendance: 30,084
- Game weather: Partly Cloudy and Breezy, 82 °F (28 °C)
- Referee: Karl Richins
- TV announcers (ABC): Eric Collins, Ray Bentley

Scoring summary
| 1 | 7:10 | UNLV | Dillon Pieffer 33-yard field goal | UNLV 3-0 |
| 1 | 0:41 | UNLV | Dillon Pieffer 33-yard field goal | UNLV 6-0 |
| 2 | 13:50 | UNLV | Dyante Perkins 4-yard run (Dillon Pieffer kick) | UNLV 13-0 |
| 2 | 9:56 | BYU | Tody Christensen 8-yard pass from Matt Berry (Matt Payne kick) | UNLV 13-7 |
| 2 | 4:02 | BYU | Matt Payne 40-yard field goal | UNLV 13-10 |
| 2 | 0:02 | BYU | Matt Payne 50-yard field goal | TIED 13-13 |
| 4 | 4:56 | UNLV | Earvin Johnson 22-yard pass from Kurt Nantkes (Dillon Pieffer kick) | UNLV 20-13 |
| 4 | 0:29 | BYU | Matt Berry 1-yard run (Matt Payne kick) | TIED 20-20 |
| OT | | BYU | Tody Christensen 15-yard pass from Matt Berry (Matt Payne kick) | BYU 27-20 |

=== Boise State ===
| Team | 1 | 2 | 3 | 4 | Total |
|---|---|---|---|---|---|
| • Boise State | 14 | 14 | 8 | 14 | 50 |
| BYU | 2 | 0 | 10 | 0 | 12 |

- Date: October 30
- Location: LaVell Edwards Stadium, Provo, UT
- Game start: 5:45 p.m. MST
- Elapsed time: 3:35
- Game attendance: 60,554
- Game weather: Snow, 32 °F (0 °C), wind SW 5–8 mph (8.0–12.9 km/h)
- Referee: Gerald Wright
- TV announcers (ESPN): Mike Tirico, Kirk Herbstreit, Lee Corso, Dr. Jerry Punch

Scoring summary
| 1 | 11:56 | BSU | Cam hall blocked punt recovery in the end zone (Tyler Jones kick) | BSU 7-0 |
| 1 | 7:56 | BSU | David Mikell 2-yard run (Tyler Jones kick) | BSU 14-0 |
| 1 | 5:01 | BYU | Team Safety | BSU 14-2 |
| 2 | 10:11 | BSU | Wes Nurse 42-yard interception return (Tyler Jones kick) | BSU 21-2 |
| 2 | 5:52 | BSU | Tim Gilligan 28-yard pass from Ryan Dinwiddie (Tyler Jones kick) | BSU 28-2 |
| 3 | 9:27 | BYU | Team Safety | BSU 28-4 |
| 3 | 2:04 | BYU | Tafui Vakapuna 1-yard run (Tody Christensen run) | BSU 28-12 |
| 3 | 0:56 | BSU | Tim Gilligan 4-yard run (Tim Gilligan run) | BSU 36-12 |
| 4 | 12:48 | BSU | Ryan Dinwiddie 2-yard run (Tyler Jones kick) | BSU 43-12 |
| 4 | 3:45 | BSU | Tim Gilligan 27-yard pass from Ryan Dinwiddie (Tyler Jones kick) | BSU 50-12 |

=== Notre Dame ===
| Team | 1 | 2 | 3 | 4 | Total |
|---|---|---|---|---|---|
| BYU | 7 | 0 | 0 | 7 | 14 |
| • Notre Dame | 6 | 10 | 7 | 10 | 33 |

- Date: November 15
- Location: Notre Dame Stadium, Notre Dame, IN
- Game start: 2:56 p.m. CST
- Elapsed time: 3:19
- Game attendance: 80,795
- Game weather: Cloudy, 39 °F (4 °C), winds S 7 mph (11 km/h)
- Referee: Ken Flaherty
- TV announcers (NBC/Westwood One): Tom Hammond, Pat Haden, Lewis Johnson (NBC)
  Tony Roberts, Allen Pinkett (Westwood One)

Scoring summary
| 1 | 7:38 | ND | D.J. Fitzpatrick 27-yard field goal | ND 3-0 |
| 1 | 6:17 | BYU | Rey Brathwaite 18-yard run (Matt Payne kick) | BYU 7-3 |
| 1 | 0:56 | ND | D.J. Fitzpatrick 31-yard field goal | BYU 7-6 |
| 2 | 3:38 | ND | D.J. Fitzpatrick 34-yard field goal | ND 9-7 |
| 2 | 0:25 | ND | Julius Jones 1-yard run (D.J. Fitzpatrick kick) | ND 16-7 |
| 3 | 0:02 | ND | Julius Jones 23-yard run (D.J. Fitzpatrick kick) | ND 23-7 |
| 4 | 12:23 | ND | D.J. Fitzpatrick 38-yard field goal | ND 26-7 |
| 4 | 7:27 | BYU | Matt Berry 1-yard run (Matt Payne kick) | ND 26-14 |
| 4 | 0:47 | BYU | Julius Jones 13-yard run (D.J. Fitzpatrick kick) | ND 33-14 |

=== Utah ===
| Team | 1 | 2 | 3 | 4 | Total |
|---|---|---|---|---|---|
| • UTAH | 0 | 3 | 0 | 0 | 3 |
| BYU | 0 | 0 | 0 | 0 | 0 |

- Date: November 22
- Location: LaVell Edwards Stadium, Provo, UT
- Game start: 1:05 p.m. MST
- Elapsed time: 2:58
- Game attendance: 64,486
- Game weather: 19 °F (−7 °C), Snow flurries, winds variable 15 mph (24 km/h)
- Referee: Clair Gausman
- TV announcers (ESPN+): Gary Bender, JC Pearson, Anne Marie Anderson

Scoring summary
| 2 | 4:13 | UTAH | Nate Borreson 41-yard field goal | UTAH 3-0 |
