= 2003 Duke Blue Devils football team =

American college football season

2003 Duke Blue Devils football
- Conference: Atlantic Coast Conference
- Record: 4–8 (2–6 ACC)
- Head coach: Carl Franks (5th season; first 7 games); Ted Roof (interim; last 5 games)
- Offensive coordinator: Jim Pry (1st season)
- Offensive scheme: Fun and gun
- Defensive coordinator: Ted Roof (2nd season)
- Base defense: Multiple 4–3
- MVPs: Chris Douglas; Ryan Fowler; Terrell Smith
- Captains: Ryan Fowler; Terrell Smith; Drew Strojny; Alex Wade
- Home stadium: Wallace Wade Stadium

2003 Atlantic Coast Conference football standings
	Conf.			Overall
Team	W		L	W		L
No. 11 Florida State $	7	–	1	10	–	3
No. 17 Maryland	6	–	2	10	–	3
No. 22 Clemson	5	–	3	9	–	4
NC State	4	–	4	8	–	5
Virginia	4	–	4	8	–	5
Georgia Tech	4	–	4	7	–	6
Wake Forest	3	–	5	5	–	7
Duke	2	–	6	4	–	8
North Carolina	1	–	7	2	–	10
$ – BCS representative as conference champion; Rankings from AP Poll

The 2003 Duke Blue Devils football team represented the Duke University in the 2003 NCAA Division I-A football season. The team participated as members of the Atlantic Coast Conference. They played their homes games at Wallace Wade Stadium in Durham, North Carolina. The team was led by head coach Carl Franks, who was fired during the season and replaced by interim head coach, Ted Roof. Duke won two of the last three games of the season under Roof earning him the full-time coaching position.

== Schedule ==
Date	Time	Opponent	Site	TV	Result	Attendance
August 30	7:00 pm	at No. 18 Virginia	Scott Stadium; Charlottesville, VA		L 0–27	61,737
September 6	6:00 pm	Western Carolina*	Wallace Wade Stadium; Durham, NC		W 29–3	18,022
September 13	6:00 pm	Rice*	Wallace Wade Stadium; Durham, NC		W 27–24 ^{OT}	18,742
September 20	2:00 pm	Northwestern*	Wallace Wade Stadium; Durham, NC		L 10–28	21,143
September 27	7:00 pm	No. 6 Florida State	Wallace Wade Stadium; Durham, NC	PPV	L 7–56	24,370
October 11	6:00 pm	at Maryland	Byrd Stadium; College Park, MD		L 20–33	50,084
October 18	12:00 pm	Wake Forest^{†}	Wallace Wade Stadium; Durham, NC (rivalry)	JPS	L 13–42	17,314
October 25	1:00 pm	NC State	Wallace Wade Stadium; Durham, NC (rivalry)		L 21–28	27,614
November 1	4:00 pm	at No. 19 Tennessee*	Neyland Stadium; Knoxville, TN	PPV	L 6–23	104,772
November 8	1:00 pm	Georgia Tech	Wallace Wade Stadium; Durham, NC		W 41–17	12,976
November 15	1:00 pm	at Clemson	Memorial Stadium; Clemson, SC		L 7–40	71,731
November 22	1:00 pm	at North Carolina	Kenan Memorial Stadium; Chapel Hill, NC (Victory Bell)		W 30–22	48,000
*Non-conference game; ^{†}Homecoming; Rankings from AP Poll released prior to the game; All times are in Eastern time

== Roster ==
2003 Duke Blue Devils football team roster
Players
Coaches
Offense

Pos.	#	Name	Class
OT	65	Christian Mitchell	Jr
C	78	Dan Mooney	Sr
FB	40	Zach Novak	Jr
QB	16	Adam Smith	Sr
OT	75	Drew Strojny	Sr

Defense

Pos.	#	Name	Class
DE	98	Drew Ciepcielinski	Sr
LB	27	Ryan Fowler	Sr
DE	97	David Martin	So

Special teams

Pos.	#	Name	Class

Head coach

- Ted Roof

Coordinators/assistant coaches

- Brad Sherrod
  (Linebackers coach)

Legend

- (C) Team captain
- (S) Suspended
- (I) Ineligible
- Injured
- Redshirt

Roster
Last update: 2003-12-07

== Team players in the NFL ==
Player	Position	Round	Pick	NFL club
Drew Strojny	Tackle	7	203	New York Giants
