= 2003 NCAA Division I-A football season =

American college football season

2003 NCAA Division I-A season
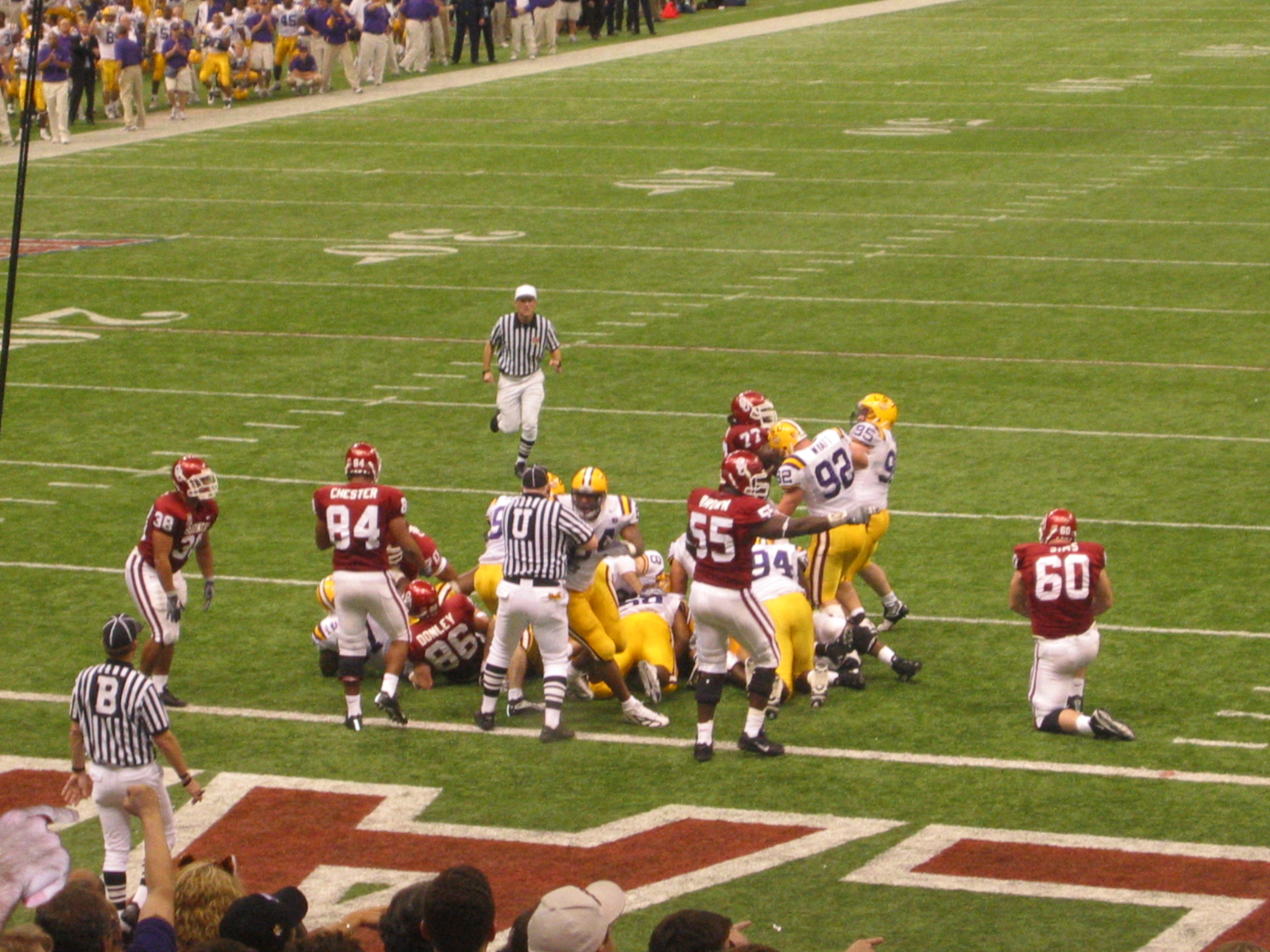
- Gameplay during the BCS National Championship Sugar Bowl for the 2003 season
- Number of teams: 117
- Preseason AP No. 1: Oklahoma

Postseason
- Duration: December 16, 2003 – January 4, 2004
- Bowl games: 28
- AP Poll No. 1: USC
- Heisman Trophy: Jason White (quarterback, Oklahoma)

Bowl Championship Series
- 2004 Sugar Bowl
- Site: Louisiana Superdome, New Orleans, Louisiana
- Champion(s): LSU

Division I-A football seasons
- ← 2002 2004 →

The 2003 NCAA Division I-A football season ended with an abundance of controversy, resulting in the claim of a split national championship. This was the first claimed split title since the inception of the BCS, something the BCS intended to eliminate. Due to on-field circumstances, the BCS becoming a means of having a single champion going forward, followed by the four-team title playoff system's institution in 2014, and finally the twelve team title playoff system's institution in 2024. As of 2025 this is the most recent Division 1-A season to end with split national champions between the AP Poll and Coaches Poll. Several teams have been selected National Champions by designated selectors such as 2017 UCF and 2024 Oregon.

At season's end, three BCS Automatic Qualifying (AQ) conference teams finished the regular season with one loss, with only two spots available in the BCS National Championship Game. Three BCS Non-Automatic Qualifying (Non-AQ) conference teams also finished with one loss, TCU, Boise State and Miami (OH), stirring the debate of the BCS being unfair to BCS Non-AQ conference teams.

LSU defeated Oklahoma in the 2004 Sugar Bowl, securing the BCS National Championship, as the ESPN/USA Today Coaches' Poll was contractually obligated to vote the winner of the BCS National Championship Game No. 1, although three coaches violated this agreement by keeping USC atop their ballots. Meanwhile, when AP No. 1 USC beat (number 4) Michigan in the 2004 Rose Bowl, the AP voters kept USC in the top spot.

Army became the first team in NCAA Division I-A football modern history to finish the season 0–13.

The Home Depot Coach of the Year Award sponsored by ESPN chose USC coach Pete Carroll as their award recipient, while the Paul "Bear" Bryant Award, voted on by an association of sportswriters, chose LSU coach Nick Saban.

The Orange Bowl game was noteworthy in that Miami and Florida State previously had scheduled to play each other on Labor Day in 2004 in Miami's first game as a member of the Atlantic Coast Conference. Playing in the Orange Bowl ensured that their next meeting would be each of their very next games and their first of the 2004 season.

== BCS selection process controversy ==
USC had lost in triple overtime at California on September 27, LSU lost at home to Florida on October 11, and Oklahoma, which had been No. 1 in every BCS rating, AP and Coaches' Poll of the season, lost to Kansas State in the Big 12 Championship Game, 35–7 on December 6. Although USC, then 11–1, finished ranked No. 1 in both the AP and Coaches' Polls, with LSU (12–1) ranked No. 2 and Oklahoma (12–1) No. 3, Oklahoma surpassed both USC and LSU on several BCS computer factors. Oklahoma's schedule strength was ranked 11th to LSU's 29th and USC's 37th. Oklahoma's schedule rank was 0.44 to LSU's 1.16 and USC's 1.48. As such, although the timing of Oklahoma's loss affected the human voters, the computers kept Oklahoma at No. 1 in the BCS poll. LSU was ranked No. 2 by the BCS based on its No. 2 ranking in the AP Poll, Coaches' Poll, six of seven computer rankings (with the remaining one ranking them No. 1), and strength-of-schedule calculations. USC's No. 3 BCS ranking resulted from its No. 1 AP ranking, No. 1 Coaches' Poll ranking, and No. 3 ranking in five of seven computer rankings (with the two remaining computer rankings at No. 1 and No. 4), and schedule strength, though separated by only 0.16 points.

Ted Waitt, CEO of Gateway Computers, offered the NCAA $31 million for a national championship game between USC and Louisiana State.

== Rules changes ==
The NCAA Rules Committee adopted the following rules changes for the 2003 season:

- The "Halo Rule" (two-yard restricted area around the kick/punt returner) is abolished. The penalty for kick-catch interference remains at 15 yards if the returner is contacted before he has a chance to catch the punt/kick.
- Backs not positioned within the "tackle box" are prohibited from blocking below the waist anywhere behind the scrimmage line, and up to a point 10 yards downfield.
- The game clock will start on all kickoffs once touched in the field of play, repealing a rule change adopted in the 1997 season where the clock started on the kick (except during the final 2:00 of each half).
- Giving the offended team the option to enforce all personal fouls committed during and after a touchdown play either on the PAT or on the ensuing kickoff.

== Conference and program changes ==
No teams upgraded from Division I-AA, leaving the number of Division I-A schools fixed at 117.

- Two Independent schools joined conferences in 2003. South Florida joined Conference USA as its 11th member, while Utah State joined the Sun Belt Conference as its 8th member.

School	2002 Conference	2003 Conference
South Florida Bulls	I-A Independent	Conference USA
Utah State Aggies	I-A Independent	Sun Belt

== Regular season top 10 matchups ==
Rankings reflect the AP Poll. Rankings for Week 8 and beyond will list BCS Rankings first and AP Poll second. Teams that failed to be a top 10 team for one poll or the other will be noted.

- Week 1
  - No. 8 USC defeated No. 6 Auburn, 23–0 (Jordan-Hare Stadium, Auburn, Alabama)
- Week 6
  - No. 2 Miami defeated No. 5 Florida State, 22–14 (Doak Campbell Stadium, Tallahassee, Florida)
- Week 7
  - No. 8 Ohio State defeated No. 9 Iowa, 19–10 (Ohio Stadium, Columbus, Ohio)
- Week 9
  - No. 4/3 USC defeated No. 8/6 Washington State, 43–16 (Los Angeles Memorial Coliseum, Los Angeles, California)
  - No. 16/10 Virginia Tech defeated No. 2/2 Miami, 31–7 (Lane Stadium, Blacksburg, Virginia)
- Week 12
  - No. 9/5 Michigan defeated No. 2/4 Ohio State, 35–21 (Michigan Stadium, Ann Arbor, Michigan)
- Week 14
  - No. 3/3 LSU defeated No. 7/5 Georgia, 34–13 (2003 SEC Championship Game, Georgia Dome, Atlanta, Georgia)

== Conference standings ==
2003 Atlantic Coast Conference football standings
	Conf.			Overall
Team	W		L	W		L
No. 11 Florida State $	7	–	1	10	–	3
No. 17 Maryland	6	–	2	10	–	3
No. 22 Clemson	5	–	3	9	–	4
NC State	4	–	4	8	–	5
Virginia	4	–	4	8	–	5
Georgia Tech	4	–	4	7	–	6
Wake Forest	3	–	5	5	–	7
Duke	2	–	6	4	–	8
North Carolina	1	–	7	2	–	10
$ – BCS representative as conference champion; Rankings from AP Poll

2003 Big 12 Conference football standings
	Conf.			Overall
Team	W		L	W		L
North Division
No. 14 Kansas State x$	6	–	2	11	–	4
No. 19 Nebraska	5	–	3	10	–	3
Missouri	4	–	4	8	–	5
Kansas	3	–	5	6	–	7
Colorado	3	–	5	5	–	7
Iowa State	0	–	8	2	–	10
South Division
No. 3 Oklahoma x%	8	–	0	12	–	2
No. 12 Texas	7	–	1	10	–	3
Oklahoma State	5	–	3	9	–	4
Texas Tech	4	–	4	8	–	5
Texas A&M	2	–	6	4	–	8
Baylor	1	–	7	3	–	9
Championship: Kansas State 35, Oklahoma 7
$ – BCS representative as conference champion; % – BCS at-large representative; x – Division champion/co-champions; Rankings from AP Poll

2003 Big East Conference football standings
	Conf.			Overall
Team	W		L	W		L
No. 5 Miami (FL) $+	6	–	1	11	–	2
West Virginia +	6	–	1	8	–	5
Pittsburgh	5	–	2	8	–	5
Virginia Tech	4	–	3	8	–	5
Boston College	3	–	4	8	–	5
Syracuse	2	–	5	6	–	6
Rutgers	2	–	5	5	–	7
Temple	0	–	7	1	–	11
$ – BCS representative as conference champion; + – Conference co-champions; Rankings from AP Poll

2003 Big Ten Conference football standings
	Conf.			Overall
Team	W		L	W		L
No. 6 Michigan $	7	–	1	10	–	3
No. 4 Ohio State %	6	–	2	11	–	2
No. 18 Purdue	6	–	2	9	–	4
No. 8 Iowa	5	–	3	10	–	3
No. 20 Minnesota	5	–	3	10	–	3
Michigan State	5	–	3	8	–	5
Wisconsin	4	–	4	7	–	6
Northwestern	4	–	4	6	–	7
Penn State	1	–	7	3	–	9
Indiana	1	–	7	2	–	10
Illinois	0	–	8	1	–	11
% – BCS at-large representative; $ – Conference champion; Rankings from AP Poll

2003 Conference USA football standings
	Conf.			Overall
Team	W		L	W		L
Southern Miss $	8	–	0	9	–	4
No. 24 TCU	7	–	1	11	–	2
Memphis	5	–	3	9	–	4
Louisville	5	–	3	9	–	4
South Florida	5	–	3	7	–	4
Houston	4	–	4	7	–	6
UAB	4	–	4	5	–	7
Tulane	3	–	5	5	–	7
Cincinnati	2	–	6	5	–	7
East Carolina	1	–	7	1	–	11
Army	0	–	8	0	–	13
$ – Conference champion; Rankings from AP Poll

2003 Mid-American Conference football standings
	Conf.			Overall
Team	W		L	W		L
East Division
No. 10 Miami (OH) x$	8	–	0	13	–	1
Marshall	6	–	2	8	–	4
Akron	5	–	3	7	–	5
Kent State	4	–	4	5	–	7
UCF	2	–	6	3	–	9
Ohio	1	–	7	2	–	10
Buffalo	1	–	7	1	–	11
West Division
No. 23 Bowling Green x	7	–	1	11	–	3
Northern Illinois	6	–	2	10	–	2
Toledo	6	–	2	8	–	4
Western Michigan	4	–	4	5	–	7
Ball State	3	–	5	4	–	8
Eastern Michigan	2	–	6	3	–	9
Central Michigan	1	–	7	3	–	9
Championship: Miami 49, Bowling Green 27
$ – Conference champion; x – Division champion/co-champions; Rankings from AP Poll

2003 Mountain West Conference football standings
	Conf.			Overall
Team	W		L	W		L
No. 21 Utah $	6	–	1	10	–	2
New Mexico	5	–	2	8	–	5
Colorado State	4	–	3	7	–	6
Air Force	3	–	4	7	–	5
San Diego State	3	–	4	6	–	6
BYU	3	–	4	4	–	8
UNLV	2	–	5	6	–	6
Wyoming	2	–	5	4	–	8
$ – Conference champion; Rankings from AP Poll

2003 Pacific-10 Conference football standings
	Conf.			Overall
Team	W		L	W		L
No. 1 USC $	7	–	1	12	–	1
No. 9 Washington State	6	–	2	10	–	3
Oregon	5	–	3	8	–	5
California	5	–	3	8	–	6
Oregon State	4	–	4	8	–	5
Washington	4	–	4	6	–	6
UCLA	4	–	4	6	–	7
Arizona State	2	–	6	5	–	7
Stanford	2	–	6	4	–	7
Arizona	1	–	7	2	–	10
$ – Conference champion; Rankings from AP Poll

2003 Southeastern Conference football standings
	Conf.			Overall
Team	W		L	W		L
Eastern Division
No. 7 Georgia xy	6	–	2	11	–	3
No. 15 Tennessee x	6	–	2	10	–	3
No. 24 Florida x	6	–	2	8	–	5
South Carolina	2	–	6	5	–	7
Vanderbilt	1	–	7	2	–	10
Kentucky	1	–	7	4	–	8
Western Division
No. 2 LSU xy$#	7	–	1	13	–	1
No. 13 Ole Miss x	7	–	1	10	–	3
Auburn	5	–	3	8	–	5
Arkansas	4	–	4	9	–	4
Alabama	2	–	6	4	–	9
Mississippi State	1	–	7	2	–	10
Championship: LSU 34, Georgia 13
# – BCS National Champion; $ – BCS representative as conference champion; x – Division champion/co-champions; y – Championship game participant; Rankings from AP Poll

2003 Sun Belt Conference football standings
	Conf.			Overall
Team	W		L	W		L
North Texas $	7	–	0	9	–	4
Louisiana–Lafayette	3	–	2	4	–	8
Arkansas State	3	–	3	5	–	7
Middle Tennessee	3	–	3	4	–	8
Utah State	3	–	3	3	–	9
Idaho	3	–	4	3	–	9
New Mexico State	2	–	5	3	–	9
Louisiana–Monroe	1	–	5	1	–	11
$ – Conference champion

2003 Western Athletic Conference football standings
	Conf.			Overall
Team	W		L	W		L
No. 16 Boise State $	8	–	0	13	–	1
Fresno State	6	–	2	9	–	5
Tulsa	6	–	2	8	–	5
Hawaii	5	–	3	9	–	5
Rice	5	–	3	5	–	7
Nevada	4	–	4	6	–	6
Louisiana Tech	3	–	5	5	–	7
San Jose State	2	–	6	3	–	8
UTEP	1	–	7	2	–	10
SMU	0	–	8	0	–	12
$ – Conference champion; Rankings from AP Poll

2003 NCAA Division I-A independents football records
	Conf.			Overall
Team	W		L	W		L
Connecticut		–		9	–	3
Navy		–		8	–	5
Troy State		–		6	–	6
Notre Dame		–		5	–	7
Rankings from AP Poll

== I-AA team wins over I-A teams ==
Italics denotes I-AA teams.

Date	Visiting team	Home team	Site	Result	Attendance	Ref.
August 28	Florida Atlantic	Middle Tennessee	Johnny "Red" Floyd Stadium • Murfreesboro, Tennessee	20–19	23,261	
September 4	No. 4 (I-AA) Western Illinois	Eastern Michigan	Rynearson Stadium • Ypsilanti, Michigan	34–12	11,123	
September 6	Cal Poly	UTEP	Sun Bowl • El Paso, Texas	34–13	26,224	
September 6	Eastern Washington	Idaho	Kibbie Dome • Moscow, Idaho	8–5	13,556	
September 6	Stephen F. Austin	UL Monroe	Malone Stadium • Monroe, Louisiana	23–21	15,056	
September 6	No. 9 (I-AA) Villanova	Temple	Lincoln Financial Field • Philadelphia, Pennsylvania (Mayor's Cup)	23–20 ^{2OT}	30,090	
September 13	Colgate	Buffalo	University at Buffalo Stadium • Amherst, New York	38–15	20,324	
September 20	No. 15 (I-AA) Northwestern State	UL Monroe	Malone Stadium • Monroe, Louisiana	14–10	16,035	
September 27	Idaho	No. 9 (I-AA) Montana	Washington–Grizzly Stadium • Missoula, Montana (Little Brown Stein)	41–28	23,679	
October 25	No. 3 (I-AA) Delaware	Navy	Navy–Marine Corps Memorial Stadium • Annapolis, Maryland	21–17	34,982	
^{#}Rankings from AP Poll released prior to game.

== Bowl Championship Series rankings ==
WEEK	No. 1	No. 2	EVENT
OCT 20	Oklahoma	Miami	
OCT 27	Oklahoma	Miami	Virginia Tech 31, Miami 7
NOV 3	Oklahoma	USC	
NOV 10	Oklahoma	USC	
NOV 17	Oklahoma	Ohio State	Michigan 35, Ohio State 21
NOV 24	Oklahoma	USC	
DEC 1	Oklahoma	USC	LSU 34, Georgia 13
FINAL	Oklahoma	LSU	

== Bowl games ==
Rankings given are AP poll positions at time of game

=== BCS bowls ===
- Sugar Bowl, BCS National Championship Game: No. 2 (BCS No. 2) LSU 21, No. 3 (BCS No. 1) Oklahoma 14
- Rose Bowl: No. 1 (Pac-10 Champ) Southern California 28, No. 4 (Big 10 Champ) Michigan 14
- Orange Bowl: No. 10 (Big East Champ) Miami 16, No. 9 (ACC Champ) Florida State 14
- Fiesta Bowl: No. 6 (At Large) Ohio State 35, No. 8 (Big 12 Champ) Kansas State 28

=== Other January bowls ===
- Cotton Bowl Classic: No. 16 Mississippi 31, No. 21 Oklahoma State 28
- Capital One Bowl: No. 11 Georgia 34, No. 12 Purdue 27 (OT)
- Gator Bowl: No. 23 Maryland 41, No. 20 West Virginia 7
- Outback Bowl: No. 13 Iowa 37, No. 17 Florida 17
- Peach Bowl: Clemson 27, No. 6 Tennessee 14
- Humanitarian Bowl: Georgia Tech 52, Tulsa 10

=== December Bowl games ===
- Houston Bowl: Texas Tech 38, Navy 14
- Liberty Bowl: No. 25 (MWC Champ) Utah 17, (C-USA Champ) Southern Mississippi 0
- Continental Tire Bowl: Virginia 23, Pittsburgh 16
- Independence Bowl: Arkansas 27, Missouri 14
- Silicon Valley Football Classic: Fresno State 17, UCLA 9
- Sun Bowl: No. 24 Minnesota 31, Oregon 30
- Music City Bowl: Auburn 28, Wisconsin 14
- Holiday Bowl: No. 15 Washington State 28, No. 5 Texas 20
- San Francisco Bowl: Boston College 35, Colorado State 21
- Alamo Bowl: No. 22 Nebraska 17, Michigan State 3
- Insight Bowl: California 52, Virginia Tech 49
- Tangerine Bowl: NC State 56, Kansas 26
- Motor City Bowl: Bowling Green 28, Northwestern 24
- Hawai'i Bowl: Hawai'i 54, Houston 48 (3 OT)
- Fort Worth Bowl: No. 18 (WAC Champ) Boise State 34, No. 19 TCU 31
- Las Vegas Bowl: Oregon State 55, New Mexico 14
- GMAC Bowl: No. 14 (MAC Champ) Miami (Ohio) 49, Louisville 28
- New Orleans Bowl: Memphis 27, (Sun Belt Champ) North Texas 17

== Final AP Poll ==
Team	Final Record	Points
1. USC (48)	12–1	1,608
2. LSU (17)	13–1	1,576
3. Oklahoma	12–2	1,476
4. Ohio State	11–2	1,411
5. Miami (FL)	11–2	1,329
6. Michigan	10–3	1,281
7. Georgia	11–3	1,255
8. Iowa	10–3	1,107
9. Washington State	10–3	1,060
10. Miami (OH)	13–1	932
11. Florida State	10–3	905
12. Texas	10–3	887
13. Mississippi	10–3	845
14. Kansas State	11–4	833
15. Tennessee	10–3	695
16. Boise State	13–1	645
17. Maryland	10–3	564
18. Purdue	9–4	526
19. Nebraska	10–3	520
20. Minnesota	10–3	368
21. Utah	10–2	308
22. Clemson	9–4	230
23. Bowling Green	11–3	189
24. Florida	8–5	165
25. Texas Christian	11–2	126

Others receiving votes: 26. Oklahoma State 109, 27. Arkansas 73, 28. Virginia 36, 29. Northern Illinois 30, 30. Auburn 8, 30. Oregon State 8, 32. Pittsburgh 7, 32. N.C. State 7, 34. West Virginia 4, 35. Connecticut 2.

== Final Coaches Poll ==
Three coaches voted for USC as the No. 1 team, even though the polled coaches are required to vote the BCS champion as No. 1. Because the votes were not public, it is not known which three coaches placed those votes. However, it is known that USC coach Pete Carroll could not have voted for his own team since he was not a voting coach that season.

Team	Final Record	Points
1. LSU (60)	13–1	1,572
2. USC (3)	12–1	1,514
3. Oklahoma	12–2	1,429
4. Ohio State	11–2	1,370
5. Miami (FL)	11–2	1,306
6. Georgia	11–3	1,183
7. Michigan	10–3	1,140
8. Iowa	10–3	1,119
9. Washington State	10–3	983
10. Florida State	10–3	929
11. Texas	10–3	894
12. Miami (OH)	13–1	800
13. Kansas State	11–4	746
14. Mississippi	10–3	730
15. Boise State	13–1	704
16. Tennessee	10–3	684
17. Minnesota	10–3	553
18. Nebraska	10–3	532
19. Purdue	9–4	510
20. Maryland	10–3	462
21. Utah	10–2	327
22. Clemson	9–4	219
23. Bowling Green	11–3	170
24. TCU	11–2	145
25. Florida	8–5	124

Also receiving votes

Northern Illinois (10–2) 80; Arkansas (9–4) 74; Oklahoma State (9–4) 63; Auburn (8–5) 20; North Carolina State (8–5) 17; Oregon State (8–5) 15; West Virginia (8–5) 14; Southern Mississippi (9–4) 12; Fresno State (9–5) 6; Hawaii (9–5) 6; Pittsburgh (8–5) 5; Texas Tech (8–5) 4; Marshall (8–4) 3; Virginia (8–5) 3; Boston College (8–5) 2; California (8–6) 1; Connecticut (9–3) 1; Memphis (9–4) 1; Michigan State Spartans (8–5) 1; Missouri (8–5) 1; North Texas (9–4) 1.

== Heisman Trophy voting ==
The Heisman Trophy is given to the year's most outstanding player

Player	School	Position	1st	2nd	3rd	Total
Jason White	Oklahoma	QB	319	204	116	1,481
Larry Fitzgerald	Pittsburgh	WR	253	233	128	1,353
Eli Manning	Ole Miss	QB	95	132	161	710
Chris Perry	Michigan	RB	27	66	128	341
Darren Sproles	Kansas State	RB	15	30	29	134
Matt Leinart	USC	QB	5	27	58	127
Philip Rivers	NC State	QB	18	20	24	118
Mike Williams	USC	WR	12	12	18	78
Ben Roethlisberger	Miami (OH)	QB	5	9	14	47
B. J. Symons	Texas Tech	QB	1	7	21	38

== Other major awards ==
- Maxwell Award (College Player of the Year): Eli Manning, Mississippi
- Walter Camp Award (top back): Larry Fitzgerald, Pittsburgh
- AP Player Of the Year: Jason White, Oklahoma
- Davey O'Brien Award (quarterback): Jason White, Oklahoma
- Johnny Unitas Award (Sr. quarterback): Eli Manning, Mississippi
- Doak Walker Award (running back): Chris Perry, Michigan
- Fred Biletnikoff Award (wide receiver): Larry Fitzgerald, Pittsburgh
- John Mackey Award (tight end): Kellen Winslow, Miami, Florida
- Lombardi Award (top lineman/linebacker): Tommie Harris, Oklahoma
- Dave Rimington Trophy (center): Jake Grove, Virginia Tech
- Outland Trophy (interior lineman): Robert Gallery, Iowa
- Chuck Bednarik Award (defensive player): Teddy Lehman, Oklahoma
- Dick Butkus Award (linebacker): Teddy Lehman, Oklahoma
- Jim Thorpe Award (defensive back): Derrick Strait, Oklahoma
- Lou Groza Award (placekicker): Jonathan Nichols, Mississippi
- Ray Guy (punter): B.J. Sander, Ohio State
- Paul "Bear" Bryant Award (Coach of the Year): Nick Saban, LSU
- The Home Depot Coach of the Year Award: Pete Carroll, USC

== Attendances ==
#	Team	G	Total	Average
1	Michigan	7	776,429	110,918
2	Penn State	7	739,403	105,629
3	Tennessee	7	735,269	105,038
4	Ohio State	8	838,963	104,870
5	Georgia	6	552,348	92,058
6	LSU	7	636,817	90,974
7	Florida	6	541,060	90,177
8	Auburn	7	596,422	85,203
9	Texas	6	500,034	83,339
10	Oklahoma	7	582,413	83,202
11	Florida State	6	498,895	83,149
12	Alabama	8	659,106	82,388
13	South Carolina	8	646,754	80,844
14	Notre Dame	6	484,770	80,795
15	Wisconsin	7	549,404	78,486
16	Southern California	6	466,824	77,804
17	Nebraska	7	544,276	77,754
18	Texas A&M	7	533,703	76,243
19	Clemson	7	532,551	76,079
20	Michigan State	7	509,811	72,830
21	Washington	7	503,341	71,906
22	Iowa	7	460,584	65,798
23	Kentucky	7	454,457	64,922
24	Arkansas	7	445,119	63,588
25	Virginia Tech	7	434,214	62,031
26	Brigham Young	6	369,003	61,501
27	Virginia	6	362,545	60,424
28	Pittsburgh	6	355,183	59,197
29	Purdue	7	410,176	58,597
30	Miami Hurricanes	7	406,946	58,135
31	Oregon	6	346,207	57,701
32	UCLA	6	339,813	56,636
33	Mississippi	7	395,561	56,509
34	Arizona State	6	325,488	54,248
35	Missouri	6	319,721	53,287
36	North Carolina State	7	372,919	53,274
37	Georgia Tech	6	317,172	52,862
38	West Virginia	7	365,436	52,205
39	Maryland	6	307,418	51,236
40	Colorado	6	302,538	50,423
41	Texas Tech	6	297,650	49,608
42	Illinois	6	288,581	48,097
43	Mississippi State	6	286,000	47,667
44	North Carolina	6	282,800	47,133
45	Kansas State	8	376,878	47,110
46	Oklahoma State	7	314,107	44,872
47	Stanford	6	269,221	44,870
48	Iowa State	7	313,757	44,822
49	Minnesota	7	309,038	44,148
50	Arizona	7	299,352	42,765
51	Boston College	6	255,622	42,604
52	Syracuse	7	288,238	41,177
53	Hawaii	7	285,540	40,791
54	Louisville	6	240,279	40,047
55	Air Force	6	235,259	39,210
56	Kansas	7	271,251	38,750
57	Memphis	7	270,673	38,668
58	Fresno State	6	231,618	38,603
59	California	6	229,831	38,305
60	Connecticut	6	222,356	37,059
61	Army	7	255,605	36,515
62	TCU	6	216,931	36,155
63	Oregon State	7	252,993	36,142
64	Utah	6	210,801	35,134
65	Indiana	6	209,900	34,983
66	Washington State	5	166,653	33,331
67	New Mexico	7	232,737	33,248
68	East Carolina	6	198,073	33,012
69	Colorado State	6	183,786	30,631
70	South Florida	6	183,069	30,512
71	Navy	5	149,682	29,936
72	Baylor	7	208,960	29,851
73	Northwestern	6	172,578	28,763
74	Southern Miss	6	171,870	28,645
75	Vanderbilt	7	197,977	28,282
76	Wake Forest	7	197,911	28,273
77	Boise State	6	168,590	28,098
78	Marshall	5	139,186	27,837
79	Rutgers	6	164,032	27,339
80	Tulane	6	153,808	25,635
81	Miami RedHawks	5	125,661	25,132
82	Toledo	6	147,820	24,637
83	UNLV	6	146,191	24,365
84	UCF	5	121,574	24,315
85	Temple	5	120,687	24,137
86	Northern Illinois	7	165,026	23,575
87	UAB	5	116,190	23,238
88	San Diego State	6	135,669	22,612
89	Nevada	6	133,546	22,258
90	Tulsa	6	132,789	22,132
91	Cincinnati	6	131,766	21,961
92	Houston	6	130,844	21,807
93	Bowling Green	7	147,013	21,002
94	Troy State	4	83,596	20,899
95	Louisiana Tech	5	103,890	20,778
96	Rice	6	123,071	20,512
97	Duke	7	140,181	20,026
98	UTEP	7	140,065	20,009
99	North Texas	5	93,469	18,694
100	Western Michigan	6	110,872	18,479
101	Arkansas State	5	87,439	17,488
102	Southern Methodist	6	104,609	17,435
103	New Mexico State	5	80,343	16,069
104	Ohio	6	94,944	15,824
105	Wyoming	6	94,214	15,702
106	San Jose State	5	75,398	15,080
107	Utah State	5	74,604	14,921
108	Louisiana-Lafayette	6	83,970	13,995
109	Central Michigan	6	83,442	13,907
110	Akron	6	82,869	13,812
111	Buffalo	6	74,513	12,419
112	Ball State	6	74,034	12,339
113	Idaho	5	60,319	12,064
114	Louisiana-Monroe	5	56,492	11,298
115	Eastern Michigan	7	78,808	11,258
116	Middle Tennessee	6	66,127	11,021
117	Kent State	6	51,144	8,524
