= 2003 Continental Tire Bowl =

Pittsburgh Panthers	Virginia Cavaliers
(8–4)	(7–5)
Big East	ACC
16	23
Head coach: Walt Harris	Head coach: Al Groh
	1	2	3	4	Total
Pittsburgh	0	13	3	0	16
Virginia	7	10	3	3	23
- Date: December 27, 2003
- Season: 2003
- Stadium: Bank of America Stadium
- Location: Charlotte, North Carolina
- MVP: QB Matt Schaub (Virginia)
- Favorite: Pitt 10 1/2
- Referee: Penn Wagers (SEC)
- Attendance: 51,236

United States TV coverage
- Network: ESPN2
- Announcers: Pam Ward (Play by Play); Chris Spielman (Analyst); Mike Gleason (Sideline)

The 2003 Continental Tire Bowl featured the Pittsburgh Panthers, and the Virginia Cavaliers. The game was the second edition to this bowl game. The game was played on Saturday, December 27, 2003 at 11:00 AM EST. The win by Virginia made them 2–0 all time in the game.

Virginia scored first on a 52-yard touchdown pass from quarterback Matt Schaub to tight end Heath Miller, to take an early 7–0 lead. In the second quarter, Pittsburgh got on board with a 7-yard touchdown pass from Rod Rutherford to wide receiver Princell Brockenbrough to tie the game at 7.

Virginia answered with a 1-yard rushing touchdown by running back Wali Lundy to take a 14–7 lead. Rod Rutherford threw a 17-yard touchdown pass to Brandon Miree, but the failed extra point left the score at 14–13. Virginia's Connor Hughes kicked a 44-yard field goal before halftime to go up 17–13.

In the third quarter, Connor Hughes kicked a 30-yard field goal to increase the lead to 20–13. Pittsburgh's J. B. Gibbony kicked a 28-yard field goal to bring the score to 20–16. Connor Hughes closed the scoring with a 39-yard field goal to make the final score 23–16.

The 2003 Continental Tire Bowl was the only game in the 2003 season in which Pittsburgh wide receiver Larry Fitzgerald did not catch a touchdown pass.
