= 2003 Florida State Seminoles football team =

American college football season

2003 Florida State Seminoles football

ACC champion

Orange Bowl, L 14–16 vs. Miami (FL)
- Conference: Atlantic Coast Conference

Ranking
- Coaches: No. 10
- AP: No. 11
- Record: 10–3 (7–1 ACC)
- Head coach: Bobby Bowden (28th season)
- Offensive coordinator: Jeff Bowden (3rd season)
- Offensive scheme: Pro-style
- Defensive coordinator: Mickey Andrews (20th season)
- Base defense: 4–3
- Captains: Michael Boulware; Greg Jones; Brian Sawyer
- Home stadium: Doak Campbell Stadium

2003 Atlantic Coast Conference football standings
	Conf.			Overall
Team	W		L	W		L
No. 11 Florida State $	7	–	1	10	–	3
No. 17 Maryland	6	–	2	10	–	3
No. 22 Clemson	5	–	3	9	–	4
NC State	4	–	4	8	–	5
Virginia	4	–	4	8	–	5
Georgia Tech	4	–	4	7	–	6
Wake Forest	3	–	5	5	–	7
Duke	2	–	6	4	–	8
North Carolina	1	–	7	2	–	10
$ – BCS representative as conference champion; Rankings from AP Poll

The 2003 Florida State Seminoles football team represented the Florida State University as a member of the Atlantic Coast Conference (ACC) during the 2003 NCAA Division I-A football season. Led by 28th-year head coach Bobby Bowden, the Seminoles compiled an overall record of 10–3 with a mark of 7–1 in conference play, winning the ACC title for the second consecutive season. Florida State was invited to the Orange Bowl, where the Seminoles lost to the Miami Hurricanes. The team played home games at Doak Campbell Stadium in Tallahassee, Florida.

== Schedule ==
Date	Time	Opponent	Rank	Site	TV	Result	Attendance
August 30	8:00 p.m.	at North Carolina	No. 13	Kenan Memorial Stadium; Chapel Hill, NC	ABC	W 37–0	59,800
September 6	7:15 p.m.	Maryland	No. 11	Doak Campbell Stadium; Tallahassee, FL	ESPN2	W 35–10	82,885
September 13	8:00 p.m.	Georgia Tech	No. 10	Doak Campbell Stadium; Tallahassee, FL	ABC	W 14–13	82,133
September 20	3:30 p.m.	Colorado*	No. 10	Doak Campbell Stadium; Tallahassee, FL	ABC	W 47–7	83,294
September 27	7:00 p.m.	at Duke	No. 6	Wallace Wade Stadium; Durham, NC	PPV	W 56–7	24,370
October 11	12:00 p.m.	No. 2 Miami (FL)*	No. 5	Doak Campbell Stadium; Tallahassee, FL (rivalry, College GameDay)	ABC	L 14–22	84,336
October 18	7:45 p.m.	at Virginia	No. 7	Scott Stadium; Charlottesville, VA (Jefferson-Eppes Trophy)	ESPN	W 19–14	62,875
October 25	3:30 p.m.	Wake Forest	No. 6	Doak Campbell Stadium; Tallahassee, FL	ABC	W 48–24	82,393
November 1	2:30 p.m.	at Notre Dame*	No. 5	Notre Dame Stadium; Notre Dame, IN (rivalry)	NBC	W 37–0	80,795
November 8	7:45 p.m.	at Clemson	No. 3	Memorial Stadium; Clemson, SC (rivalry)	ESPN2	L 10–26	79,826
November 15	3:30 pm	NC State^{†}	No. 13	Doak Campbell Stadium; Tallahassee, FL	ABC	W 50–44 ^{2OT}	83,854
November 29	3:30 p.m.	at No. 11 Florida*	No. 9	Ben Hill Griffin Stadium; Gainesville, FL (rivalry, College GameDay)	CBS	W 38–34	90,407
January 1	8:30 p.m.	vs. No. 10 Miami (FL)*	No. 9	Pro Player Stadium; Miami Gardens, FL (Orange Bowl)	ABC	L 14–16	76,739
*Non-conference game; ^{†}Homecoming; Rankings from AP Poll released prior to the game; All times are in Eastern time

== Rankings ==
Ranking movements Legend: ██ Increase in ranking ██ Decrease in ranking
	Week																
Poll	Pre	1	2	3	4	5	6	7	8	9	10	11	12	13	14	15	Final
AP	13	11	10	10	6	5	5	7	6	5	3	13	11	9	9	9	11
Coaches	12	10	10	9	6	5	5	7	7	5	3	11	10	9	9	8	10
BCS	Not released								5	3	3	13	11	9	8	7	Not released
