= 2003 Georgia Tech Yellow Jackets football team =

American college football season

2003 Georgia Tech Yellow Jackets football

Humanitarian Bowl champion

Humanitarian Bowl, W 52–10 vs. Tulsa
- Conference: Atlantic Coast Conference
- Record: 7–6 (4–4 ACC)
- Head coach: Chan Gailey (2nd season)
- Co-offensive coordinators: Patrick Nix (1st as OC, 2nd overall season); Buddy Geis (1st season)
- Defensive coordinator: Jon Tenuta (2nd season)
- Home stadium: Bobby Dodd Stadium (Capacity: 55,000)

2003 Atlantic Coast Conference football standings
	Conf.			Overall
Team	W		L	W		L
No. 11 Florida State $	7	–	1	10	–	3
No. 17 Maryland	6	–	2	10	–	3
No. 22 Clemson	5	–	3	9	–	4
NC State	4	–	4	8	–	5
Virginia	4	–	4	8	–	5
Georgia Tech	4	–	4	7	–	6
Wake Forest	3	–	5	5	–	7
Duke	2	–	6	4	–	8
North Carolina	1	–	7	2	–	10
$ – BCS representative as conference champion; Rankings from AP Poll

The 2003 Georgia Tech Yellow Jackets football team represented the Georgia Institute of Technology in the 2003 NCAA Division I-A football season. The team's coach was Chan Gailey. It played its home games at Bobby Dodd Stadium in Atlanta.

== Schedule ==
Date	Time	Opponent	Site	TV	Result	Attendance
August 28	9:30 pm	at BYU*	LaVell Edwards Stadium; Provo, UT	ESPN2	L 13–24	61,930
September 6	3:30 pm	No. 17 Auburn*	Bobby Dodd Stadium; Atlanta, GA (rivalry)	ABC	W 17–3	55,000
September 13	8:00 pm	at No. 10 Florida State	Doak Campbell Stadium; Tallahassee, FL	ABC	L 13–14	82,133
September 20	7:00 pm	Clemson	Bobby Dodd Stadium; Atlanta, GA (rivalry)		L 3–39	53,189
September 27	7:00 pm	at Vanderbilt*	Vanderbilt Stadium; Nashville, TN (rivalry)	PPV	W 24–17 ^{OT}	25,007
October 4	12:00 pm	NC State^{†}	Bobby Dodd Stadium; Atlanta, GA	JPS	W 29–21	50,113
October 11	3:30 pm	at Wake Forest	Groves Stadium; Winston-Salem, North Carolina		W 24–7	27,382
October 23	7:45 pm	Maryland	Bobby Dodd Stadium; Atlanta, GA	ESPN	W 7–3	51,524
November 8	1:00 pm	at Duke	Wallace Wade Stadium; Durham, NC		L 17–41	12,976
November 15	12:00 pm	North Carolina	Bobby Dodd Stadium; Atlanta, GA	JPS	W 41–24	52,346
November 22	12:00 pm	at Virginia	Scott Stadium; Charlottesville, VA	JPS	L 17–29	58,526
November 29	1:00 pm	No. 5 Georgia*	Bobby Dodd Stadium; Atlanta, GA (Clean, Old-Fashioned Hate)	ABC	L 17–34	55,000
January 3	12:00 pm	vs. Tulsa*	Bronco Stadium; Boise, ID (Humanitarian Bowl)	ESPN	W 52–10	23,118
*Non-conference game; ^{†}Homecoming; Rankings from AP Poll released prior to the game; All times are in Eastern time
