= 2004 Humanitarian Bowl =

Georgia Tech Yellow Jackets	Tulsa Golden Hurricane
(6–6)	(8–4)
ACC	WAC
52	10
Head coach: Chan Gailey	Head coach: Steve Kragthorpe
	1	2	3	4	Total
Georgia Tech	7	3	21	21	52
Tulsa	0	3	0	7	10
- Date: January 3, 2004
- Season: 2003
- Stadium: Bronco Stadium
- Location: Boise, Idaho
- Referee: R.G. Detillier (C-USA)
- Attendance: 23,114
- Payout: US$750,000 per team

The 2004 Humanitarian Bowl was the 7th edition of the bowl game. The next edition was played in December 2004, almost a year from this game, and the name was changed after this contest to the "MPC Computers Bowl". This game featured the Georgia Tech Yellow Jackets, and the Tulsa Golden Hurricane. In this game Georgia Tech set several Humanitarian Bowl records. The 42 point margin of victory is a bowl game record.

Georgia Tech running back P. J. Daniels started the scoring on a 9-yard touchdown run, giving the Yellow Jackets a 7–0 lead. He would finish with a bowl game record 307 yards on 31 carries for the game. In the second quarter Tulsa's Brad DeVault kicked a 22-yard field goal to draw Tulsa to within 7–3. Georgia Tech kicker Dan Burnett kicked a 29-yard field goal in the second quarter to help Georgia Tech claim a 10–3 halftime lead.

In the third quarter, Daniels scored on a 1-yard touchdown run for Georgia Tech to bump its lead up to 17–3. Chris Woods added a 2-yard touchdown run to increase the lead to 24–3. Daniels scored on a 33-yard touchdown scamper to make the score 31–3, to close out the third quarter.

In the fourth quarter, Daniels went on a 38-yard touchdown scamper to increase the lead to 38–3. Jermaine Hatch added a 1-yard touchdown run to make it 45–3, as Georgia Tech had scored 38 unanswered points. Quarterback Paul Smith found Garrett Mills for a 13-yard touchdown, for Tulsa to cut it to 45–10. Jermaine Hatch scored from 8 yards out, as Georgia Tech completed the game 52–10. Georgia Tech held Tulsa to -56 rushing yards, the lowest ever in Tulsa history.

This was the third meeting between the schools - both previous meetings were also bowl games.
