= 2003 Maryland Terrapins football team =

American college football season

2003 Maryland Terrapins football
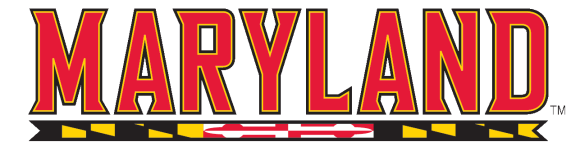

Gator Bowl champion

Gator Bowl, W 41–7 vs. West Virginia
- Conference: Atlantic Coast Conference

Ranking
- Coaches: No. 20
- AP: No. 17
- Record: 10–3 (6–2 ACC)
- Head coach: Ralph Friedgen (3rd season)
- Offensive coordinator: Charlie Taaffe (3rd season)
- Defensive coordinator: Gary Blackney (3rd season)
- Home stadium: Byrd Stadium

2003 Atlantic Coast Conference football standings
| | Conf. | | | Overall |
| Team | W | | L | W | | L |
|---|---|---|---|---|---|---|
| No. 11 Florida State $ | 7 | – | 1 | 10 | – | 3 |
| No. 17 Maryland | 6 | – | 2 | 10 | – | 3 |
| No. 22 Clemson | 5 | – | 3 | 9 | – | 4 |
| NC State | 4 | – | 4 | 8 | – | 5 |
| Virginia | 4 | – | 4 | 8 | – | 5 |
| Georgia Tech | 4 | – | 4 | 7 | – | 6 |
| Wake Forest | 3 | – | 5 | 5 | – | 7 |
| Duke | 2 | – | 6 | 4 | – | 8 |
| North Carolina | 1 | – | 7 | 2 | – | 10 |
$ – BCS representative as conference champion; Rankings from AP Poll

The 2003 Maryland Terrapins football team represented the University of Maryland in the 2003 NCAA Division I FBS football season. It was the Terrapins' 51st season as a member of the Atlantic Coast Conference (ACC). Ralph Friedgen led the team for his third season as head coach, while Charlie Taaffe served as the third-year offensive coordinator and Gary Blackney as the third-year defensive coordinator. Maryland finished the season with a 10–3 record. The Terrapins received an invitation to the Gator Bowl, where they defeated West Virginia, 41–7, in what was a rematch of a regular season game.

== Schedule ==
| Date | Time | Opponent | Rank | Site | TV | Result | Attendance |
|---|---|---|---|---|---|---|---|
| August 28 | 7:30 pm | at Northern Illinois* | No. 15 | Huskie Stadium; DeKalb, IL | FSN | L 13–20 ^{OT} | 28,018 |
| September 6 | 7:15 pm | at No. 13 Florida State | | Doak Campbell Stadium; Tallahassee, FL | ESPN2 | L 10–35 | 82,885 |
| September 13 | 6:00 pm | The Citadel* | | Byrd Stadium; College Park, MD | | W 61–0 | 51,594 |
| September 20 | 6:00 pm | West Virginia* | | Byrd Stadium; College Park, MD (rivalry) | | W 34–7 | 51,973 |
| September 27 | 6:00 pm | at Eastern Michigan* | | Rynearson Stadium; Ypsilanti, MI | | W 37–13 | 19,628 |
| October 4 | 3:30 pm | Clemson | | Byrd Stadium; College Park, MD | ABC | W 21–7 | 51,545 |
| October 11 | 6:00 pm | Duke | | Byrd Stadium; College Park, MD | | W 33–20 | 50,084 |
| October 23 | 7:45 pm | at Georgia Tech | | Bobby Dodd Stadium; Atlanta, GA | ESPN | L 3–7 | 51,524 |
| November 1 | 12:00 pm | North Carolina^{†} | | Byrd Stadium; College Park, MD | JPS | W 59–21 | 51,195 |
| November 13 | 7:45 pm | Virginia | | Byrd Stadium; College Park, MD (rivalry) | ESPN | W 27–17 | 51,027 |
| November 22 | 3:30 pm | at NC State | | Carter–Finley Stadium; Raleigh, NC | ABC | W 26–24 | 53,800 |
| November 29 | 3:30 pm | at Wake Forest | | Groves Stadium; Winston-Salem, NC | ESPN | W 41–28 | 18,783 |
| January 1 | 1:00 pm | vs. No. 23 West Virginia* | No. 24 | Alltel Stadium; Jacksonville, FL (Gator Bowl) | NBC | W 41–7 | 78,892 |
*Non-conference game; ^{†}Homecoming; Rankings from AP Poll released prior to the game; All times are in Eastern time

== 2003 Terrapins in professional football ==
The following players were selected in the 2004 NFL draft.

| Player | Position | Round | Overall | NFL team |
|---|---|---|---|---|
| Madieu Williams | Defensive back | 2 | 56 | Cincinnati Bengals |
| Randy Starks | Defensive tackle | 3 | 71 | Tennessee Titans |
| Leon Joe | Linebacker | 4 | 112 | Chicago Bears |
| Jeff Dugan | Tight end | 7 | 220 | Minnesota Vikings |
| Bruce Perry | Running back | 7 | 242 | Philadelphia Eagles |

This squad would be loaded with future NFL players on top of the prior names whom were drafted including

- DE Shawne Merriman
- LB Jon Condo
- LB D'Qwell Jackson
- CB Domonique Foxworth
- PK Nick Novak
- P Adam Podlesh
- TE Vernon Davis
- CB Josh Wilson (American football)
