= 2003 Clemson Tigers football team =

American college football season

2003 Clemson Tigers football

Peach Bowl champion

Peach Bowl, W 27–14 vs. Tennessee
- Conference: Atlantic Coast Conference

Ranking
- Coaches: No. 22
- AP: No. 22
- Record: 9–4 (5–3 ACC)
- Head coach: Tommy Bowden (5th season)
- Offensive coordinator: Brad Scott (3rd season)
- Offensive scheme: Pro set
- Defensive coordinator: John Lovett (2nd season)
- Base defense: 4–3
- Captains: Tony Elliott; DeJuan Polk; Gregory Walker
- Home stadium: Memorial Stadium

2003 Atlantic Coast Conference football standings
	Conf.			Overall
Team	W		L	W		L
No. 11 Florida State $	7	–	1	10	–	3
No. 17 Maryland	6	–	2	10	–	3
No. 22 Clemson	5	–	3	9	–	4
NC State	4	–	4	8	–	5
Virginia	4	–	4	8	–	5
Georgia Tech	4	–	4	7	–	6
Wake Forest	3	–	5	5	–	7
Duke	2	–	6	4	–	8
North Carolina	1	–	7	2	–	10
$ – BCS representative as conference champion; Rankings from AP Poll

The 2003 Clemson Tigers football team represented Clemson University as a member of the Atlantic Coast Conference (ACC) during the 2003 NCAA Division I-A football season. Led by fifth-year head coach Tommy Bowden, the Tigers compiled an overall record of 9–4 with a mark of 5–3 in conference play, placing third in the ACC. Clemson was invited to the Peach Bowl, where the Tigers defeated Tennessee. The team played home games at Memorial Stadium in Clemson, South Carolina.

== Schedule ==
Date	Time	Opponent	Site	TV	Result	Attendance
August 30	12:00 p.m.	No. 9 Georgia*	Memorial Stadium; Clemson, SC (rivalry)	ABC	L 0–30	82,034
September 6	5:00 p.m.	Furman*	Memorial Stadium; Clemson, SC		W 28–17	71,477
September 13	5:00 p.m.	Middle Tennessee*	Memorial Stadium; Clemson, SC		W 37–14	73,197
September 20	7:00 p.m.	at Georgia Tech	Bobby Dodd Stadium; Atlanta, GA (rivalry)		W 39–3	53,189
October 4	3:30 p.m.	at Maryland	Byrd Stadium; College Park, MD	ABC	L 7–21	51,545
October 11	12:00 p.m.	No. 25 Virginia	Memorial Stadium; Clemson, SC	JPS	W 30–27 ^{OT}	76,774
October 16	7:45 p.m.	at NC State	Carter–Finley Stadium; Raleigh, NC (Textile Bowl)	ESPN	L 15–17	53,800
October 25	12:00 p.m.	North Carolina	Memorial Stadium; Clemson, SC	JPS	W 36–28	77,512
November 1	3:30 p.m.	at Wake Forest	Groves Stadium; Winston-Salem, NC		L 17–45	35,643
November 8	7:45 p.m.	No. 3 Florida State	Memorial Stadium; Clemson, SC (rivalry)	ESPN2	W 26–10	79,826
November 15	1:00 p.m.	Duke	Memorial Stadium; Clemson, SC		W 40–7	71,731
November 22	7:00 p.m.	at South Carolina*	Williams–Brice Stadium; Columbia, SC (rivalry)	ESPN2	W 63–17	83,987
January 2, 2004	4:30 p.m.	vs. No. 6 Tennessee*	Georgia Dome; Atlanta, GA (Peach Bowl)	ESPN	W 27–14	75,125
*Non-conference game; Rankings from AP Poll released prior to the game; All times are in Eastern time

== Roster ==
2003 Clemson Tigers football team roster
Players			Coaches
Offense: Pos. / # / Name / Class; QB / 6 / Charlie Whitehurst / So	Defense: Pos. / # / Name / Class; LB / 45 / John Leake / Sr	Special teams: Pos. / # / Name / Class	Head coach: Tommy Bowden; Coordinators/assistant coaches: David Blackwell – Linebackers/recruiting coordinator; Legend: (C) Team captain; (S) Suspended; (I) Ineligible; Injured; Redshirt; Roster; Last update: 2003-11-19
