= 2003 North Carolina Tar Heels football team =

American college football season

2003 North Carolina Tar Heels football
- Conference: Atlantic Coast Conference
- Record: 2–10 (1–7 ACC)
- Head coach: John Bunting (3rd season)
- Offensive coordinator: Gary Tranquill (3rd season)
- Offensive scheme: Pro-style
- Defensive coordinator: Dave Huxtable (2nd season)
- Base defense: 4–3
- Captains: Dexter Reid; Jeb Terry; D. J. Walker
- Home stadium: Kenan Memorial Stadium

2003 Atlantic Coast Conference football standings
	Conf.			Overall
Team	W		L	W		L
No. 11 Florida State $	7	–	1	10	–	3
No. 17 Maryland	6	–	2	10	–	3
No. 22 Clemson	5	–	3	9	–	4
NC State	4	–	4	8	–	5
Virginia	4	–	4	8	–	5
Georgia Tech	4	–	4	7	–	6
Wake Forest	3	–	5	5	–	7
Duke	2	–	6	4	–	8
North Carolina	1	–	7	2	–	10
$ – BCS representative as conference champion; Rankings from AP Poll

The 2003 North Carolina Tar Heels football team represented the University of North Carolina at Chapel Hill as a member of the Atlantic Coast Conference (ACC) during the 2003 NCAA Division I-A football season. Led by third-year head coach John Bunting, the Tar Heels played their home games at Kenan Memorial Stadium in Chapel Hill, North Carolina. North Carolina finished the season 2–10 overall and 1–7 in ACC play to place last out of nine teams.

== Schedule ==
Date	Time	Opponent	Site	TV	Result	Attendance	Source
August 30	8:00 p.m.	No. 13 Florida State	Kenan Memorial Stadium; Chapel Hill, NC	ABC	L 0–37	59,800	
September 6	1:30 p.m.	Syracuse*	Kenan Memorial Stadium; Chapel Hill, NC		L 47–49 ^{3OT}	47,000	
September 20	12:00 p.m.	at Wisconsin*	Camp Randall Stadium; Madison, WI	ESPN	L 27–38	77,439	
September 27	2:00 p.m.	at NC State	Carter–Finley Stadium; Raleigh, NC (rivalry)		L 34–47	53,800	
October 4	1:30 p.m.	Virginia	Kenan Memorial Stadium; Chapel Hill, NC (South's Oldest Rivalry)		L 13–38	51,000	
October 11	3:30 p.m.	at East Carolina*	Dowdy–Ficklen Stadium; Greenville, NC		W 28–17	44,040	
October 18	1:30 p.m.	Arizona State*	Kenan Memorial Stadium; Chapel Hill, NC		L 31–33	42,000	
October 25	12:00 p.m.	at Clemson	Memorial Stadium; Clemson, SC	JPS	L 28–36	77,512	
November 1	12:00 p.m.	at Maryland	Byrd Stadium; College Park, MD	JPS	L 21–59	51,195	
November 8	12:00 p.m.	Wake Forest^{†}	Kenan Memorial Stadium; Chapel Hill, NC (rivalry)	JPS	W 42–34	35,000	
November 15	12:00 p.m.	at Georgia Tech	Bobby Dodd Stadium; Atlanta, GA	JPS	L 24–41	52,346	
November 22	1:00 p.m.	Duke	Kenan Memorial Stadium; Chapel Hill, NC (Victory Bell)		L 22–30	48,000	
*Non-conference game; ^{†}Homecoming; Rankings from AP Poll released prior to the game; All times are in Eastern time

== Coaching staff ==
Name	Position	Seasons in Position
John Bunting	Head coach	3rd
Gunter Brewer	Wide Receivers	4th
Ken Browning	Tight Ends	10th
Jeff Connors	Strength and conditioning coordinator	3rd
Jim Fleming	Defensive Backs	2nd
Hal Hunter	Offensive Line	2nd
Dave Huxtable	Defensive coordinator / Linebackers	3rd
Brad Lawing	Defensive Line / recruiting coordinator	1st
Andre' Powell	Running backs	3rd
Gary Tranquill	Offensive coordinator / quarterbacks	3rd
James Webster, Jr.	Assistant head coach/ special teams coordinator	3rd
Matt House	Defensive Assistant	1st
