= 2003 Virginia Tech Hokies football team =

American college football season

2003 Virginia Tech Hokies football

Insight Bowl, L 49–52 vs. California
- Conference: Big East Conference
- Record: 8–5 (4–3 Big East)
- Head coach: Frank Beamer (17th season)
- Offensive coordinator: Bryan Stinespring (2nd season)
- Offensive scheme: Pro-style
- Defensive coordinator: Bud Foster (9th season)
- Base defense: 4–4
- Home stadium: Lane Stadium

2003 Big East Conference football standings
	Conf.			Overall
Team	W		L	W		L
No. 5 Miami (FL) $+	6	–	1	11	–	2
West Virginia +	6	–	1	8	–	5
Pittsburgh	5	–	2	8	–	5
Virginia Tech	4	–	3	8	–	5
Boston College	3	–	4	8	–	5
Syracuse	2	–	5	6	–	6
Rutgers	2	–	5	5	–	7
Temple	0	–	7	1	–	11
$ – BCS representative as conference champion; + – Conference co-champions; Rankings from AP Poll

The 2003 Virginia Tech Hokies football team represented Virginia Tech in the 2003 NCAA Division I-A football season. They played their home games at Lane Stadium in Blacksburg, Virginia and participated as members of the Big East Conference. The Hokies finished the 2003 season with a record of 8–5 (4–3 Big East) under head coach Frank Beamer. Virginia Tech opened the year with six straight wins, including dominant performances over Texas A&M and Syracuse, and climbed as high as No. 3 in the AP Poll. The offense was led by quarterback Bryan Randall, who threw for 1,996 yards and 15 touchdowns, and tailback Kevin Jones, who rushed for 1,647 yards and 21 touchdowns — the second-highest single-season rushing total in school history. Wide receiver Ernest Wilford added 887 receiving yards and seven touchdowns. Defensively, the Hokies were anchored by linebacker Mikal Baaqee and cornerback DeAngelo Hall, who also contributed as a return specialist and wide receiver. Virginia Tech averaged 35.4 points per game while allowing 23.0, finishing 13th nationally in scoring offense. However, the team faltered down the stretch, losing four of its final six games, including a 52–49 shootout against California in the Insight Bowl.

2003 was the Hokies' final season as a Big East Conference member. Virginia Tech and Miami joined the Atlantic Coast Conference for the 2024 football season, starting the 2005 NCAA conference realignment.

== Schedule ==
Date	Time	Opponent	Rank	Site	TV	Result	Attendance	Source
August 31	3:00 p.m.	Central Florida*	No. 9	Lane Stadium; Blacksburg, VA	ESPN	W 49–28	65,115	
September 6	1:00 p.m.	James Madison*	No. 9	Lane Stadium; Blacksburg, VA		W 43–0	65,115	
September 18	7:45 p.m.	Texas A&M*	No. 8	Lane Stadium; Blacksburg, VA	ESPN	W 35–19	65,115	
September 27	12:00 p.m.	Connecticut*	No. 5	Lane Stadium; Blacksburg, VA	ESPN Plus	W 47–13	65,115	
October 4	12:00 p.m.	at Rutgers	No. 4	Rutgers Stadium; Picataway, NJ	ESPN Plus	W 48–22	28,956	
October 11	12:00 p.m.	Syracuse^{†}	No. 4	Lane Stadium; Blacksburg, VA	ESPN	W 51–7	65,115	
October 22	7:30 p.m.	at West Virginia	No. 3	Mountaineer Field; Morgantown, WV (rivalry)	ESPN	L 7–28	56,319	
November 1	7:45 p.m.	No. 2 Miami (FL)	No. 10	Lane Stadium; Blacksburg, VA (rivalry)	ESPN	W 31–7	65,115	
November 8	7:45 p.m.	at No. 25 Pittsburgh	No. 5	Heinz Field; Pittsburgh, PA (College GameDay)	ESPN	L 28–31	66,207	
November 15	1:00 p.m.	at Temple	No. 12	Lincoln Financial Field; Philadelphia, PA		W 24–23 ^{OT}	27,425	
November 22	3:30 p.m.	Boston College	No. 12	Lane Stadium; Blacksburg, VA (rivalry)	ESPN	L 27–34	65,115	
November 29	1:00 p.m.	at Virginia*	No. 21	Scott Stadium; Charlottesville, VA (rivalry)	ABC	L 21–35	60,943	
December 26	8:30 p.m.	vs. California*		Bank One Ballpark; Phoenix, AZ (Insight Bowl)	ESPN	L 49–52	42,364	
*Non-conference game; ^{†}Homecoming; Rankings from AP Poll released prior to the game; All times are in Eastern time

== Game summaries ==
=== August 31 – vs. UCF ===
UCF at Virginia Tech

Team	1	2	3	4	Total
University of Central Florida	0	14	0	14	28
• Virginia Tech	14	14	0	21	49

- Date: August 31, 2003
- Location: Lane Stadium
- Game start: 3:04 PM EDT
- Elapsed time: 3:31
- Game attendance: 65,115
- Game weather: 77°F; wind 7 mph West
- Referee: Stan Evans

Scoring summary
1	9:53	VT	Kevin Jones 1-yard run (Carter Warley kick)	VT 7–0
1	4:29	VT	Richard Johnson 21-yard pass from Bryan Randall (Carter Warley kick)	VT 14–0
2	13:15	VT	Justin Hamilton 7-yard pass from Bryan Randall (Carter Warley kick)	VT 21–0
2	8:52	VT	Kevin Jones 18-yard rush (Carter Warley kick)	VT 28–0
2	6:43	UCF	Tavaris Capers 11-yard pass from Ryan Schneider (Matt Prater kick)	VT 28–7
2	1:25	UCF	Alex Haynes 16-yard rush (Matt Prater kick)	VT 28–14
4	14:50	UCF	Tavaris Capers 7-yard pass from Ryan Schneider (Matt Prater kick)	VT 28–21
4	12:11	VT	Deangelo Hall 29-yard pass from Bryan Randall (Carter Warley kick)	VT 35–21
4	11:32	VT	Jason Lallis 45-yard interception return (Carter Warley kick)	VT 42–21
4	04:39	VT	David Clowney 27-yard from Marcus Vick (Carter Warley kick)	VT 49–21
4	00:29	UCF	Darcy Johnson 11-yard pass from Ryan Schneider (Matt Prater Kick)	VT 49–28

Virginia Tech opened the 2003 season with a 49–28 victory over UCF at Lane Stadium. The Hokies came out smoking, scoring on their first 4 drives while holding UCF to only 4 yards on their first 3. The Knights came to life, scoring 2 touchdowns to close out the half. In the 4th, the Knights reverse-Beamer-balled the usually exceptional special teams play of the Hokies by blocking Carter Warley's 21-yard field goal attempt. Despite this, the game was never in question. Bryan Randall had a dominant performance, going 22–28 with 3 touchdowns and zero interceptions. This game also marked the well-anticipated debut of disgraced quarterback Marcus Vick, who completed 7 of 10 passes with a touchdown to freshman David Clowney.

=== September 6 – vs. James Madison ===
James Madison at Virginia Tech

Team	1	2	3	4	Total
James Madison University	0	0	0	0	0
• Virginia Tech	7	13	16	7	43

- Date: September 6, 2003
- Location: Lane Stadium
- Game start: 1:00 PM EDT
- Elapsed time: 2:49
- Game attendance: 65,115
- Game weather: Overcast/Sunny; 64°F; calm
- Referee: Dyrol Prioleau

Scoring summary
1	10:35	VT	Bryan Randall 47-yard run (Carter Warley kick)	VT 7–0
2	9:30	VT	Carter Warley 43-yard Field Goal	VT 10–0
2	8:02	VT	Carter Warley 23-yard Field Goal	VT 13–0
2	1:49	VT	Cedric Humes 11-yard run (Carter Warley kick)	VT 20–0
3	8:58	VT	Cedric Humes 1-yard run (Carter Warley kick failed)	VT 26–0
3	6:57	VT	Cedric Humes 10 yd run (Carter Warley kick)	VT 33–0
3	1:48	VT	Carter Warley 26 yd Field Goal	VT 36–0
4	1:09	VT	John Candelas 3-yard run (Carter Warley kick)	VT 43–0

The Hokies defeated James Madison 43–0 on a temperate September afternoon. The dominant performance allowed the Hokies the opportunity to rest their starters, with scout team QB Lance Goff completing a 31-yard pass, the only pass attempt of his career. Cedric Humes scored 3 of the Hokies' 5 rushing touchdowns, and backup fullback John Candelas scored another on 49 yards carried.

=== September 18 – vs. Texas A&M ===
Texas A&M at Virginia Tech

Team	1	2	3	4	Total
Texas A&M	3	9	0	7	19
• Virginia Tech	7	7	7	14	35

- Date: September 18, 2003
- Location: Lane Stadium
- Game start: 7:45 PM EDT
- Elapsed time: 3:09
- Game attendance: 65,115
- Game weather: Rainy and Windy; 63°F; 10-20NNW
- Referee: Jon Bible
- TV announcers (ESPN): Lee Corso, Kirk Herbstreit, Mike Tirico

Scoring summary
1	10:54	VT	Kevin Jones 1-yard run (Carter Warley kick)	VT 7–0
1	3:23	TAM	Todd Pegram 22-yard Field Goal	VT 7–3
2	13:03	VT	Jeff King 10-yard pass from Bryan Randall (Carter Warley kick)	VT 14–3
2	7:55	TAM	Tood Pegram 20-yard Field Goal	VT 14–6
2	1:15	TAM	Courtney Lewis 2-yard run (Reggie Mcneal pass failed)	VT 14–12
3	12:53	VT	Kevin Jones 2-yard run (Carter Warley kick)	VT 21–12
4	14:24	TAM	Tim Van Zant 15-yard pass from Reggie Mcneal (Todd Pegram kick)	VT 21–19
4	8:20	VT	Bryan Randall 12-yard run (Carter Warley kick)	VT 28-19
4	5:33	VT	Kevin Jones 11-yard run (Carter Warley kick)	VT 35–19

In a blustery and rainy nationally televised Thursday night matchup, Virginia Tech defeated Texas A&M 35–19. Hurricane Isabel provided the weather with expectations of 40mph wind gusts and 2-inches of rain. While the actual impact wasn't as dramatic, the weather had a huge impact on the game, and was a dominant topic of ESPN's live coverage. The Hokies emphasized their ground game, anchored by Kevin Jones's 30 carries for a career high 188 yards and 3 touchdowns. Despite the wind and rain, Bryan Randall went 9-13 passing providing balance to the offense, helping Jones succeed. Randall also ran 59 for yards and TD.

The Hokies scored early, taking a 14–3 lead, but the Aggies scored 9 points to close out the half, down 14-12 due to a missed 2-point conversion with 1:15 remaining. The Hokies and Aggies traded touchdowns, keeping the game close with 14:24 left in the 4th quarter. Virginia Tech answered with an 11 play, 80-yard drive for a touchdown. On the ensuing kickoff, Brandon Pace tried a pooch kick that caught Texas A&M off guard. Bryan Jones fumbled and The Hokies recovered on the Aggies' 33 yard line. Kevin Jones ran for his 3rd Touchdown, concluding scoring with 5:33 left in the game.

=== September 27 – vs. Connecticut ===
Virginia Tech rolled to a 47–13 win over Connecticut in Lane Stadium, improving to 4–0.

=== October 4 – at Rutgers ===
The Hokies remained unbeaten with a 48–22 road win over Rutgers in Piscataway.

=== October 11 – vs. Syracuse ===
In a series where the Home team dominates, Virginia Tech continued that tradition defeating Syracuse 51–7 at Lane Stadium.

=== October 22 – at West Virginia ===
#3 Virginia Tech at West Virginia

Team	1	2	3	4	Total
Virginia Tech	0	7	0	0	7
• West Virginia	14	0	14	0	28

- Date: October 22, 2003
- Location: Mountaineer Field
- Game start: 7:30 PM EDT
- Elapsed time: 3:07
- Game attendance: 56,319
- Game weather: Overcast; 43°F; 8mph NW
- Referee: Jack Cramer

Scoring summary
1	4:18	WVU	Kay-Jay Harris 7-yard run (Brad Cooper kick)	WVU 7–0
1	2:01	WVU	Quincy Wilson 5-yard run (Brad Cooper kick)	WVU 14–0
2	2:07	VT	Vincent Fuller 50-yard fumble return (Carter Warley kick)	WVU 14–7
3	10:56	WVU	Travis Garvin 93-yard pass from Rasheed Marshall (Brad Cooper Kick)	WVU 21–7
3	2:57	WVU	Rasheed Marshall 4-yard run (Brad Cooper kick)	WVU 28–7

Virginia Tech suffered its first loss of the season in a 28–7 defeat at West Virginia. WVU completely shut down Tech's offense, out-gaining them 426-211. Tech was held to only 65 yards rushing and Bryan Randall threw 3 interceptions.

WVU held a 14–0 lead late into the quarter. WVU attempted a field goal from the Hokie 30-yard line with 2:21 in the half. The kick ended up sailing wide right, but the Hokies were called on a very dubious Running Into The Kicker penalty, granting a first down at the 25-yard line. On the next play WVU tailback Quincy Wilson fumbled, which picked up by Vegas Robinson, who subsequently fumbled on the 50-yard line. Vincent Fuller picked up that fumble and returned it for a touchdown, cutting WVU's lead in half.

The Hokies failed to carry the change of momentum forward, giving up two touchdowns in the 3rd quarter and failing to score in the second half.

=== November 1 – vs. No. 2 Miami (FL) ===
#2 Miami at #10 Virginia Tech

Team	1	2	3	4	Total
University of Miami	0	0	0	7	7
• Virginia Tech	0	10	21	0	31

- Date: November 1, 2003
- Location: Lane Stadium
- Game start: 7:47 PM EST
- Elapsed time: 3:37
- Game attendance: 65,115
- Game weather: Clear; 59°F; calm
- Referee: John Smith

Scoring summary
2	12:55	VT	Deangelo Hall 28-yard fumble return (Carter Warley kick)	VT 7–0
2	0:07	VT	Carter Warley 39-yard Field Goal	VT 10–0
3	9:22	VT	Eric Green 51-yard interception return (Carter Warley kick)	VT 17–0
3	4:35	VT	Kevin Jones 2-yard run (Carter Warley kick)	VT 24–0
3	0:34	VT	Ernest Wilford 46-yard pass from Marcus Vick (Carter Warley kick)	VT 31–0
4	7:53	MIA	Jason Geathers 10-yard pass from Derrick Crudup (Jon Peattie kick)	VT 31–7

Virginia Tech rebounded in dramatic fashion with a 31–7 upset of No. 2 Miami in Blacksburg, snapping the Hurricanes’ 18-game road winning streak, 23-game conference winning streak, and 39-game regular season winning streak. Kevin Jones rushed for 124 yards and a touchdown, but it was the defense, with 3 interceptions, including 1 for a touchdown, and a fumble recovery for a touchdown, that provided the dominating victory. The Hokies led 10–0 at halftime and 31-0 into the 4th quarter before Miami finally scored. In the second half, the Hurricanes' offensive struggles contributed to them losing all composure, as evidenced by 14 penalties for 117 yards. The victory against #2 broke Virginia Tech's 0-19 steak against Top 5 teams.

=== November 8 – at No. 25 Pittsburgh ===
Virginia Tech fell 31–28 in a back-and-forth battle at Heinz Field, despite a career-best performance from Kevin Jones. The junior tailback rushed for 241 yards and four touchdowns, including scoring runs of 1, 11, 13, and 80 yards. The Hokies led 28–24 late in the fourth quarter, but Pittsburgh's Lousaka Polite ran for a 2-yard touchdown with under two minutes remaining to give the Panthers the win. Bryan Randall and Marcus Vick split time at quarterback, but Vick's 2 Interceptions stalled the Hokie offense. On defense, Mikal Baaqee intercepted Rod Rutherford, and Vincent Fuller recovered a fumble.

=== November 15 – at Temple ===
Virginia Tech narrowly escaped Philadelphia with a 24–23 win over Temple, surviving a late rally and a missed field goal by the Owls in the final minute. Carter Warley opened the scoring with a 26-yard field goal, and Kevin Jones followed with a 9-yard touchdown run. Bryan Randall's 28-yard touchdown pass to Ernest Wilford gave the Hokies a 17–0 lead. Temple responded with 17 unanswered points, taking the game into overtime. Jones finished with 150 rushing yards a touchdown, while Randall threw for 127 yards and a score.

=== November 22 – vs. Boston College ===
Virginia Tech fell 34–27 to Boston College in a back-and-forth contest in Blacksburg. Kevin Jones rushed for 165 yards and 3 touchdowns and Bryan Randall recorded no interceptions in 23 attempts, passing for 176 yards. Doug Easlick led the team with 4 receptions while also providing excellent blocking at fullback. Defensively, Mikal Baaqee led the team with 15 tackles, and the Hokies recorded three sacks but struggled to contain Derrick Knight, who rushed for 197 yards.

=== November 29 – at Virginia ===
Virginia Tech's 4-game winning streak against their in-state rivals ended on a windy November afternoon. The Hokies lost possession of the Commonwealth Cup, 35-21, having held it since October 2, 1999. The Hokies took a 14–7 lead into the half, but the Wahoos scored 21 unanswered points to start the second half. Tech put together an 18 play, 91-yard drive resulting in a 2-yard touchdown run by Kevin Jones to make it a one score game. Virginia responded with a 4:30 drive ending in a 19-yard rushing touchdown, putting the game away.

=== December 26 – vs. California (Insight Bowl) ===
Virginia Tech closed the season with a 52–49 loss to California in the Insight Bowl, a wild shootout in Phoenix that featured over 1,000 yards of combined offense and a breakout performance from Cal quarterback Aaron Rodgers. Tech's offense exploded with Bryan Randall completing 24 of 34 passes for 398 yards with 4 touchdowns and 0 interceptions, and Kevin Jones rushing 16 times for 153 yards and a score. Despite the offensive success, 3 missed field goals represented the difference between victory and defeat.

== Rankings ==
Ranking movements Legend: ██ Increase in ranking ██ Decrease in ranking — = Not ranked
	Week																	
Poll	Pre	1	2	3	4	5	6	7	8	9	10	11	12	13	14	15	16	Final
AP	9	9	9	8	5	4	4	3	3	10	5	12	12	21	—	—	—	Not released
Coaches Poll	10	9	9	8	5	4	4	3	3	11	5	12	12	20	—	—	—	—
BCS	Not released								3	16	6	15	17	—	—	—	Not released	
