= 2003 West Virginia Mountaineers football team =

American college football season

2003 West Virginia Mountaineers football

Big East co-champion

Gator Bowl, L 7–41 vs. Maryland
- Conference: Big East Conference
- Record: 8–5 (6–1 Big East)
- Head coach: Rich Rodriguez (3rd season)
- Offensive scheme: Spread option
- Defensive coordinator: Jeff Casteel (2nd season)
- Base defense: 3–3–5
- Home stadium: Mountaineer Field

2003 Big East Conference football standings
	Conf.			Overall
Team	W		L	W		L
No. 5 Miami (FL) $+	6	–	1	11	–	2
West Virginia +	6	–	1	8	–	5
Pittsburgh	5	–	2	8	–	5
Virginia Tech	4	–	3	8	–	5
Boston College	3	–	4	8	–	5
Syracuse	2	–	5	6	–	6
Rutgers	2	–	5	5	–	7
Temple	0	–	7	1	–	11
$ – BCS representative as conference champion; + – Conference co-champions; Rankings from AP Poll

The 2003 West Virginia Mountaineers football team represented West Virginia University as a member of the Big East Conference during the 2003 NCAA Division I-A football season. Led by third-year head coach Rich Rodriguez, the Mountaineers compiled an overall record of 8–5 with a mark of 6–1 in conference play, sharing the Big East title with the Miami Hurricanes. West Virginia was invited the Gator Bowl, where the Mountaineers lost to Maryland. The team played home games at Mountaineer Field in Morgantown, West Virginia.

West Virginia rebounded from a 1–4 start to end capture the program's first conference championship since 1993.

== Schedule ==
Date	Time	Opponent	Rank	Site	TV	Result	Attendance	Source
August 30	12:00 p.m.	No. 21 Wisconsin*		Mountaineer Field; Morgantown, WV	ESPN	L 17–24	60,663	
September 6	7:00 p.m.	at East Carolina*		Dowdy–Ficklen Stadium; Greenville, NC		W 48–7	36,088	
September 13	12:00 p.m.	Cincinnati*		Mountaineer Field; Morgantown, WV	ESPN Plus	L 13–15	51,189	
September 20	6:05 p.m.	at Maryland*		Byrd Stadium; College Park, MD		L 7–34	51,973	
October 2	7:30 p.m.	at No. 2 Miami (FL)		Miami Orange Bowl; Miami, FL	ESPN	L 20–22	54,621	
October 11	12:00 p.m.	Rutgers		Mountaineer Field; Morgantown, WV	ESPN Plus	W 34–19	50,896	
October 22	7:30 p.m.	No. 3 Virginia Tech		Mountaineer Field; Morgantown, WV (rivalry)	ESPN	W 28–7	56,319	
November 1	1:00 p.m.	UCF*^{†}		Mountaineer Field; Morgantown, WV		W 36–18	42,712	
November 8	12:00 p.m.	at Boston College		Alumni Stadium; Chestnut Hill, MA	ESPN Plus	W 35–28	39,723	
November 15	7:00 p.m.	No. 16 Pittsburgh		Mountaineer Field; Morgantown, WV (Backyard Brawl)	ESPN2	W 52–31	67,715	
November 22	12:00 p.m.	at Syracuse	No. 25	Carrier Dome; Syracuse, NY (rivalry)	ESPN2	W 34–23	41,801	
November 29	12:00 p.m.	Temple	No. 24	Mountaineer Field; Morgantown, WV	ESPN Plus	W 45–28	35,942	
January 1	12:30 p.m.	vs. No. 23 Maryland*	No. 20	Alltel Stadium; Jacksonville, FL (Gator Bowl)	NBC	L 7–41	78,892	
*Non-conference game; ^{†}Homecoming; Rankings from AP Poll released prior to the game; All times are in Eastern time

== Roster ==
2003 West Virginia Mountaineers football team roster
Players
Coaches
Offense

Pos.	#	Name	Class
RB	1	Kay-Jay Harris	Jr
QB	2	Rasheed Marshall	Jr
RB	3	Quincy Wilson	Sr
WR	5	Chris Henry	So
FB	36	Adam King	Sr
WR	86	John Pennington	Jr

Defense

Pos.	#	Name	Class
LB	6	Grant Wiley	Sr
DB	9	Adam Jones	So
DB	19	Lance Frazier	Sr
DE	92	Ben Lynch	Jr

Special teams

Pos.	#	Name	Class

Head coach

- Rich Rodriguez

Coordinators/assistant coaches

Legend

- (C) Team captain
- (S) Suspended
- (I) Ineligible
- Injured
- Redshirt

== Team players in the NFL ==
Player	Position	Round	Pick	NFL club
Quincy Wilson	Running back	7	219	Atlanta Falcons
