= 2003 NC State Wolfpack football team =

American college football team season

2003 NC State Wolfpack football

Tangerine Bowl champion

Tangerine Bowl, W 56–26 vs. Kansas
- Conference: Atlantic Coast Conference
- Record: 8–5 (4–4 ACC)
- Head coach: Chuck Amato (4th season)
- Offensive coordinator: Noel Mazzone (1st season)
- Defensive coordinator: Chuck Amato (2nd season)
- Home stadium: Carter–Finley Stadium

2003 Atlantic Coast Conference football standings
	Conf.			Overall
Team	W		L	W		L
No. 11 Florida State $	7	–	1	10	–	3
No. 17 Maryland	6	–	2	10	–	3
No. 22 Clemson	5	–	3	9	–	4
NC State	4	–	4	8	–	5
Virginia	4	–	4	8	–	5
Georgia Tech	4	–	4	7	–	6
Wake Forest	3	–	5	5	–	7
Duke	2	–	6	4	–	8
North Carolina	1	–	7	2	–	10
$ – BCS representative as conference champion; Rankings from AP Poll

The 2003 NC State Wolfpack football team represented North Carolina State University during the 2003 NCAA Division I-A football season. The team's head coach was Chuck Amato. N.C. State has been a member of the Atlantic Coast Conference (ACC) since the league's inception in 1953. The Wolfpack played its home games in 2003 at Carter–Finley Stadium in Raleigh, North Carolina, which has been NC State football's home stadium since 1966.

== Schedule ==
Date	Time	Opponent	Rank	Site	TV	Result	Attendance
August 30	6:00 pm	Western Carolina*	No. 16	Carter–Finley Stadium; Raleigh, North Carolina		W 59–20	53,800
September 6	12:00 pm	at Wake Forest	No. 14	Groves Stadium; Winston-Salem, North Carolina (rivalry)	ABC	L 24–38	35,741
September 13	12:00 pm	at No. 3 Ohio State*	No. 24	Ohio Stadium; Columbus, Ohio	ABC	L 38–44 ^{3OT}	104,890
September 20	12:00 pm	Texas Tech*		Carter–Finley Stadium; Raleigh, North Carolina	ESPN2	W 49–21	53,800
September 27	2:00 pm	North Carolina		Carter–Finley Stadium; Raleigh, North Carolina (rivalry)	PPV	W 47–34	53,800
October 4	12:00 pm	at Georgia Tech		Bobby Dodd Stadium; Atlanta	JPS	L 21–29	50,113
October 11	1:00 pm	Connecticut*		Carter–Finley Stadium; Raleigh, North Carolina		W 31–24	50,119
October 16	7:45 pm	Clemson		Carter–Finley Stadium; Raleigh, North Carolina (Textile Bowl)	ESPN	W 17–15	53,800
October 25	1:00 pm	at Duke		Wallace Wade Stadium; Durham, North Carolina (rivalry)		W 28–21	27,614
November 1	3:30 pm	Virginia		Carter–Finley Stadium; Raleigh, North Carolina	ABC	W 51–37	53,800
November 15	3:30 pm	at No. 13 Florida State		Doak Campbell Stadium; Tallahassee, Florida	ABC	L 44–50 ^{2OT}	83,854
November 22	3:30 pm	Maryland		Carter–Finley Stadium; Raleigh, North Carolina	ABC	L 24–26	53,800
December 22	6:30 pm	vs. Kansas*		Citrus Bowl; Orlando, Florida (Tangerine Bowl)	ESPN	W 56–26	26,482
*Non-conference game; Rankings from AP Poll released prior to the game; All times are in Eastern time

== Roster ==
2003 NC State Wolfpack football team roster
Players
Coaches
Offense

Pos.	#	Name	Class
QB	17	Philip Rivers	Sr
RB	44	T. A. McLendon	So
G	54	Sean Locklear	Sr
WR	82	Jerricho Cotchery	Sr

Defense

Pos.	#	Name	Class
DB	8	Victor Stephens	Sr
DE	9	Mario Williams	Fr
DB	14	Dovonte Edwards	Jr
DB	22	Greg Golden	Jr
CB	28	Lamont Reid	Jr
DB	36	Andre Maddox	Jr
LB	50	Stephen Tulloch	Fr
LB	91	Manny Lawson	So

Special teams

Pos.	#	Name	Class
K	21	Adam Kiker	Sr

Head coach

- Chuck Amato

Coordinators/assistant coaches

- Noel Mazzone – Offensive coordinator/tight ends
- Doc Holliday – Asst. Head coach/Wide receivers
- Mike Barry – Offensive line
- Curt Cignetti – Quarterbacks
- Dick Portee – Running backs
- Manny Diaz – Linebackers
- Todd Stroud – Strength and conditioning

Legend

- (C) Team captain
- (S) Suspended
- (I) Ineligible
- Injured
- Redshirt

== Game summaries ==
=== Ohio State ===
NC State at Ohio State

Team	1	2	3	4	OT	2OT	3OT	Total
No. 24 Wolfpack	0	7	0	17	7	7	0	38
• No. 3 Buckeyes	14	0	3	7	7	7	6	44

- Date: September 13
- Location: Ohio Stadium, Columbus, OH
- Game start: 12:00 p.m. EDT
- Game attendance: 104,890
- TV announcers (ABC): Tim Brant (Play-by-play), Ed Cunningham (Color), & Sam Ryan (Sideline)
- Source: ESPN

Scoring summary
1	4:13	Ohio St	Michael Jenkins 44-yard pass from Craig Krenzel (Mike Nugent kick)	Ohio St 7-0
1	2:47	Ohio St	Lydell Ross 2-yard run (Mike Nugent kick)	Ohio St 14-0
2	:18	NC State	Jerricho Cotchery 11-yard pass from Philip Rivers (Adam Kiker kick)	Ohio St 14-7
3	:00	Ohio St	Mike Nugent 22-yard field goal	Ohio St 17-7
4	11:25	Ohio St	Craig Krenzel 6-yard run (Mike Nugent kick)	Ohio St 24-7
4	8:26	NC State	Jerricho Cotchery 9-yard pass from Philip Rivers (Adam Kiker kick)	Ohio St 24-14
4	5:51	NC State	Adam Kiker 24-yard field goal	Ohio St 24-17
4	:21	NC State	T.J. Williams 5-yard pass from Philip Rivers (Adam Kiker kick)	Tie 24-24
OT		Ohio St	Ben Hartsock 10-yard pass from Craig Krenzel (Mike Nugent kick)	Ohio St 31-24
OT		NC State	Tramain Hall 17-yard pass from Philip Rivers (Adam Kiker kick)	Tie 31-31
2OT		NC State	T.A. McLendon 2-yard run (Adam Kiker kick)	NC State 38-31
2OT		Ohio St	Ryan Hamby 2-yard pass from Craig Krenzel (Mike Nugent kick)	Tie 38-38
3OT		Ohio St	Michael Jenkins 7-yard pass from Craig Krenzel (pass failed)	Ohio St 44-38

== Awards and honors ==
- Philip Rivers – ACC Offensive Player of the Year

== Team players in the 2004 NFL draft ==
Player	Position	Round	Pick	NFL club	Notes
Philip Rivers	Quarterback	1	4	New York Giants	Traded to San Diego Chargers
Sean Locklear	Guard	3	84	Seattle Seahawks	
Jerricho Cotchery	Wide receiver	4	108	New York Jets	
