= 2004 Peach Bowl (January) =

American college football game

2004 Chick-fil-A Peach Bowl
- 36th Peach Bowl
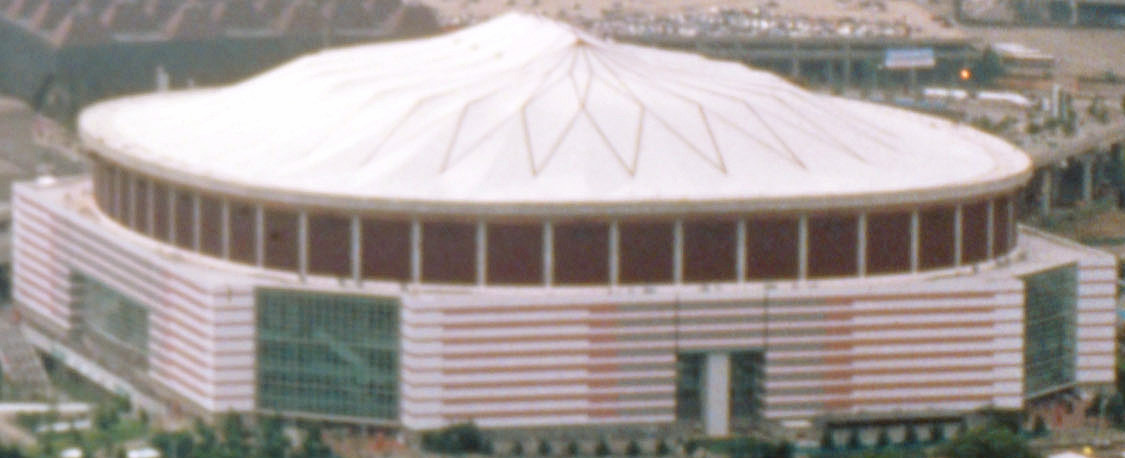
- The Georgia Dome in Atlanta, Georgia, hosted the Peach Bowl.
| Clemson Tigers | Tennessee Volunteers |
| (8-4) | (10-2) |
| ACC | SEC |
| 27 | 14 |
| Head coach: Tommy Bowden | Head coach: Phillip Fulmer |
| | AP / Coaches / BCS; 6 / 7 / 8 |
| | 1 | 2 | 3 | 4 | Total |
|---|---|---|---|---|---|
| Clemson | 10 | 14 | 0 | 3 | 27 |
| Tennessee | 7 | 7 | 0 | 0 | 14 |
- Date: January 2, 2004
- Season: 2003
- Stadium: Georgia Dome
- Location: Atlanta, Georgia
- Referee: Tom DeJoseph (Big East)
- Attendance: 75,125

United States TV coverage
- Network: ESPN
- Announcers: Ron Franklin (Play-by-Play); Mike Gottfried (Color Commentator); Erin Andrews (Sideline Reporter)

The 2004 Peach Bowl, part of the 2003–04 bowl game season, featured the Clemson Tigers and the Tennessee Volunteers.

Clemson scored first on an 8-yard touchdown run from Duane Coleman, giving Clemson a 7–0 lead. Aaron Hunt kicked a 23-yard field goal, giving Clemson a 10–0 lead. Tennessee quarterback Casey Clausen threw a 19-yard touchdown pass to Chris Hannon, pulling Tennessee to 10–7. In the second quarter, Chad Jasmin scored on a 15-yard touchdown run, giving Clemson a 17–7 lead. A 30-yard touchdown pass from Clausen to Mark Jones put Tennessee to within 17–14. Kyle Browning scored an 8-yard touchdown run on a variation of the fumblerooski to give Clemson a 24–14 halftime lead. In the fourth quarter, Hunt drilled a 28-yard field goal for the final points of the game to give Clemson the 27–14 win.
