= Delaware Fightin' Blue Hens football statistical leaders =

The Delaware Fightin' Blue Hens football statistical leaders are individual statistical leaders of the Delaware Fightin' Blue Hens football program in various categories, including passing, rushing, receiving, total offense, defensive stats, and kicking. Within those areas, the lists identify single-game, single-season, and career leaders. The Blue Hens represent the University of Delaware in the NCAA Division I FBS Conference USA (CUSA).

Although Delaware began competing in intercollegiate football in 1889, the school's official record book considers the "modern era" to have begun in 1949. Records from before this year are often incomplete and inconsistent, and they are generally not included in these lists.

Recordkeeping notes:

- From 1980 through 2024, Delaware played in the second level of Division I football, currently known as Division I FCS (known before the 2006 season as Division I-AA). Official NCAA season and career statistical totals do not include statistics recorded in I-AA/FCS playoff games before 2002, and most programs that played in FCS before 2002 follow this practice. Delaware does not; its official single-season and career leaderboards incorporate statistics from all FCS playoff games. During their FCS tenure, the Blue Hens made the playoffs 19 times and played in 44 playoff games, giving many players in that era multiple extra games to amass statistics.
- The NCAA did not count FBS bowl games toward official season statistics until 2002 (at that time, Delaware was in what is now known as FCS, and FBS was known as Division I-A). The Blue Hens played a bowl game in the second year of their FBS transition in 2025. (Note: Normally, teams transitioning from FCS to FBS are ineligible for bowl games. However, when not enough full FBS members qualify for all available bowl berths, second-year transitional programs such as Delaware in 2025 are the first alternates.)
- Since 1949, seasons in the top level of college football, now known as Division I FBS, have increased from 10 games to 11 and then 12 games in length.
- While FCS regular seasons were normally limited to 11 games before a coming expansion to 12 in 2026, NCAA rules allowed FCS teams to schedule 12 regular-season games in years when the period starting with the Thursday before Labor Day and ending with the final Saturday in November contains 14 Saturdays.
- Conference USA has held a championship game since 2005. Delaware was not eligible for that game before completing its FBS transition in 2026, but future players will have the opportunity for another extra game to amass statistics.
- The NCAA didn't allow freshmen to play varsity football until 1972 (with the exception of the World War II years), allowing players to have four-year careers.
- Since 2018, Division I players (whether in FBS or FCS) have been allowed to participate in as many as four games in a redshirt season; previously, playing in even one game "burned" the redshirt. Since 2024 in both subdivisions, postseason games have not counted against the four-game limit. These changes to redshirt rules have given very recent players several extra games to accumulate statistics.
- Due to COVID-19 issues, the NCAA ruled that the 2020 season would not count against the athletic eligibility of any football player, giving everyone who played in that season the opportunity for five years of eligibility instead of the normal four.

These lists are updated through the 2025 season.

== Passing ==
=== Passing yards ===
Career
| Rk | Player | Yards | Years |
|---|---|---|---|
| 1 | Matt Nagy | 8,214 | 1997 1998 1999 2000 |
| 2 | Joe Flacco | 7,046 | 2006 2007 |
| 3 | Bill Vergantino | 6,487 | 1989 1990 1991 1992 |
| 4 | Trent Hurley | 6,446 | 2012 2013 2014 |
| 5 | Nolan Henderson | 6,429 | 2017 2018 2019 2020 2021 2022 |
| 6 | Rich Gannon | 5,927 | 1984 1985 1986 |
| 7 | Pat Devlin | 5,696 | 2009 2010 |
| 8 | Jeff Komlo | 5,256 | 1976 1977 1978 |
| 9 | Nick Minicucci | 4,998 | 2023 2024 2025 |
| 10 | Leo Hamlett | 4,993 | 1993 1994 1995 1996 |

Single season
| Rk | Player | Yards | Year |
|---|---|---|---|
| 1 | Joe Flacco | 4,263 | 2007 |
| 2 | Nick Minicucci | 3,681 | 2025 |
| 3 | Matt Nagy | 3,436 | 2000 |
| 4 | Nolan Henderson | 3,216 | 2022 |
| 5 | Pat Devlin | 3,032 | 2010 |
| 6 | Matt Nagy | 2,916 | 1998 |
| 7 | Rich Gannon | 2,795 | 1986 |
| 8 | Joe Flacco | 2,783 | 2006 |
| 9 | Andy Hall | 2,746 | 2003 |
| 10 | Sonny Riccio | 2,698 | 2004 |

Single game
| Rk | Player | Yards | Year | Opponent |
|---|---|---|---|---|
| 1 | Matt Nagy | 556 | 1998 | Connecticut |
| 2 | Matt Nagy | 456 | 2000 | Villanova |
| 3 | Joe Flacco | 434 | 2007 | Navy |
| 4 | Nick Minicucci | 422 | 2025 | Jacksonville State |
| 5 | Joe Flacco | 419 | 2007 | New Hampshire |
| 6 | Sonny Riccio | 415 | 2004 | Maine |
| 7 | Nick Minicucci | 414 | 2026 | Western Kentucky |
| 8 | Nick Minicucci | 408 | 2026 | Kennesaw State |
| 9 | Pat Devlin | 407 | 2009 | Villanova |
| 10 | Nolan Henderson | 379 | 2022 | Rhode Island |

=== Passing touchdowns ===
Career
| Rk | Player | TDs | Years |
|---|---|---|---|
| 1 | Matt Nagy | 58 | 1997 1998 1999 2000 |
| 2 | Nolan Henderson | 56 | 2017 2018 2019 2020 2021 2022 |
| 3 | Bill Vergantino | 47 | 1989 1990 1991 1992 |
| 4 | Trent Hurley | 45 | 2012 2013 2014 |
| 5 | Leo Hamlett | 42 | 1993 1994 1995 1996 |
| 6 | Joe Flacco | 41 | 2006 2007 |
| | Rick Scully | 41 | 1979 1980 1981 1982 |
| 8 | Pat Devlin | 38 | 2009 2010 |
| | Tom DiMuzio | 38 | 1967 1968 1969 |
| | Nick Minicucci | 38 | 2023 2024 2025 |

Single season
| Rk | Player | TDs | Year |
|---|---|---|---|
| 1 | Nolan Henderson | 32 | 2022 |
| 2 | Matt Nagy | 29 | 2000 |
| 3 | Andy Hall | 25 | 2003 |
| 4 | Tom DiMuzio | 24 | 1969 |
| | Scott Brunner | 24 | 1979 |
| 6 | Joe Flacco | 23 | 2007 |
| | Nick Minicucci | 23 | 2025 |
| 8 | Pat Devlin | 22 | 2010 |
| | Trent Hurley | 22 | 2013 |
| 10 | Jeff Komlo | 20 | 1978 |
| | Matt Nagy | 20 | 1998 |

Single game
| Rk | Player | TDs | Year | Opponent |
|---|---|---|---|---|
| 1 | Nolan Henderson | 5 | 2022 | Hampton |
| | Nolan Henderson | 5 | 2022 | Monmouth |
| | Tom DiMuzio | 5 | 1969 | Lehigh |
| | Scott Brunner | 5 | 1979 | C.W. Post |
| | Pat Kehoe | 5 | 2019 | Rhode Island |
| | Nick Minicucci | 5 | 2026 | Missori State |
| 7 | 24 times | 4 | Most recent: Nick Minicucci, 2026 vs. Western Kentucky | |

== Rushing ==
=== Rushing yards ===
Career
| Rk | Player | Yards | Years |
|---|---|---|---|
| 1 | Daryl Brown | 4,587 | 1991 1992 1993 1994 |
| 2 | Andrew Pierce | 4,459 | 2010 2011 2012 2013 |
| 3 | Omar Cuff | 4,364 | 2004 2005 2006 2007 |
| 4 | Chuck Hall | 3,157 | 1968 1969 1970 |
| 5 | Vern Roberts | 2,760 | 1972 1973 1974 |
| 6 | Nate Beasley | 2,697 | 1973 1974 1975 |
| 7 | Bill Vergantino | 2,564 | 1989 1990 1991 1992 |
| 8 | Dejoun Lee | 2,447 | 2018 2019 2020 2021 |
| 9 | Gardy Kahoe | 2,374 | 1969 1970 1971 |
| 10 | Marcus Yarns | 2,344 | 2020 2021 2022 2023 2024 |

Single season
| Rk | Player | Yards | Year |
|---|---|---|---|
| 1 | Omar Cuff | 1,945 | 2007 |
| 2 | Andrew Pierce | 1,655 | 2010 |
| 3 | Germaine Bennett | 1,625 | 2003 |
| 4 | Daryl Brown | 1,469 | 1993 |
| 5 | Nate Beasley | 1,397 | 1974 |
| 6 | Gardy Kahoe | 1,328 | 1971 |
| 7 | Daryl Brown | 1,301 | 1994 |
| 8 | Vern Roberts | 1,299 | 1974 |
| 9 | Andrew Pierce | 1,279 | 2011 |
| 10 | Daryl Brown | 1,225 | 1992 |

Single game
| Rk | Player | Yards | Year | Opponent |
|---|---|---|---|---|
| 1 | Omar Cuff | 288 | 2007 | Delaware State |
| 2 | Daryl Brown | 272 | 1994 | Northeastern |
| 3 | Omar Cuff | 244 | 2007 | William & Mary |
| 4 | Wes Hills | 242 | 2016 | Maine |
| 5 | Omar Cuff | 236 | 2005 | James Madison |
| 6 | Dejoun Lee | 221 | 2020 | Rhode Island |
| 7 | Doc Doherty | 220 | 1946 | Gettysburg |
| 8 | Dick Kelley | 217 | 1968 | Massachusetts |
| 9 | Vern Roberts | 217 | 1973 | Akron |
| 10 | Andrew Pierce | 215 | 2011 | Richmond |

=== Rushing touchdowns ===
Career
| Rk | Player | TDs | Years |
|---|---|---|---|
| 1 | Omar Cuff | 65 | 2004 2005 2006 2007 |
| 2 | Daryl Brown | 47 | 1991 1992 1993 1994 |
| 3 | Andrew Pierce | 44 | 2010 2011 2012 2013 |
| 4 | Bill Vergantino | 38 | 1989 1990 1991 1992 |
| 5 | Vern Roberts | 37 | 1972 1973 1974 |
| 6 | Craig Cummings | 35 | 1997 1998 1999 2000 |
| 7 | Gardy Kahoe | 33 | 1969 1970 1971 |
| 8 | Chuck Hall | 31 | 1968 1969 1970 |
| 9 | Lanue Johnson | 29 | 1990 1991 1992 1993 |
| 10 | Rich Gannon | 26 | 1984 1985 1986 |

Single season
| Rk | Player | TDs | Year |
|---|---|---|---|
| 1 | Omar Cuff | 35 | 2007 |
| 2 | Gardy Kahoe | 24 | 1971 |
| 3 | Germaine Bennett | 21 | 2003 |
| 4 | Vern Roberts | 19 | 1974 |
| 5 | Chuck Hall | 17 | 1970 |
| | Bill Vergantino | 17 | 1992 |
| 7 | Rich Gannon | 16 | 1986 |
| | Andrew Pierce | 16 | 2011 |
| 9 | Marcus Yarns | 15 | 2023 |
| 10 | Omar Cuff | 14 | 2005 |
| | Andrew Pierce | 14 | 2010 |

Single game
| Rk | Player | TDs | Year | Opponent |
|---|---|---|---|---|
| 1 | Omar Cuff | 6 | 2007 | William & Mary |
| 2 | Marcus Yarns | 4 | 2023 | Towson |
| | Omar Cuff | 4 | 2007 | Delaware State |
| | Omar Cuff | 4 | 2007 | West Chester |
| | Omar Cuff | 4 | 2006 | New Hampshire |
| | Sonny Riccio | 4 | 2005 | Villanova |
| | Omar Cuff | 4 | 2005 | James Madison |
| | Niquan Lee | 4 | 2004 | Maine |
| | Omar Cuff | 4 | 2004 | Villanova |
| | Daryl Brown | 4 | 1994 | Northeastern |
| | Pat Williams | 4 | 1993 | Lehigh |
| | Bill Vergantino | 4 | 1992 | Boston U. |
| | Bill Vergantino | 4 | 1991 | Villanova |
| | Vern Roberts | 4 | 1974 | UNLV |
| | Gardy Kahoe | 4 | 1971 | Lehigh |
| | Gardy Kahoe | 4 | 1971 | Bucknell |
| | Mariano Stalloni | 4 | 1949 | Bradley |

== Receiving ==
=== Receptions ===
Career
| Rk | Player | Rec | Years |
|---|---|---|---|
| 1 | Aaron Love | 193 | 2005 2006 2007 2008 |
| 2 | Eddie Conti | 192 | 1994 1995 1996 1997 1998 |
| 3 | Nihja White | 188 | 2009 2010 2011 2012 |
| 4 | Mark Duncan | 185 | 2006 2007 2008 2009 |
| 5 | Michael Johnson | 182 | 2011 2012 2013 2014 |
| 6 | Courtney Batts | 179 | 1994 1995 1996 1997 |
| 7 | Thyrick Pitts | 172 | 2017 2018 2019 2020 2021 2022 |
| 8 | Justin Long | 164 | 2002 2003 2004 |
| 9 | Jamin Elliott | 158 | 1998 1999 2000 2001 |
| 10 | David Boler | 152 | 2002 2003 2004 |

Single season
| Rk | Player | Rec | Year |
|---|---|---|---|
| 1 | Eddie Conti | 91 | 1998 |
| 2 | Michael Johnson | 78 | 2014 |
| 3 | Aaron Love | 73 | 2007 |
| 4 | Mark Duncan | 70 | 2007 |
| 5 | David Boler | 68 | 2004 |
| 6 | Sean Wilson | 67 | 2025 |
| 7 | Justin Long | 65 | 2004 |
| 8 | Ben Patrick | 64 | 2006 |
| 9 | Jourdan Townsend | 61 | 2022 |
| | Kyre Duplessis | 61 | 2025 |

Single game
| Rk | Player | Rec | Year | Opponent |
|---|---|---|---|---|
| 1 | Justin Long | 16 | 2004 | Maine |
| | David Boler | 16 | 2004 | Navy |
| 3 | Eddie Conti | 15 | 1998 | Connecticut |
| 4 | Eddie Conti | 13 | 1998 | William & Mary |
| 5 | Jerel Harrison | 12 | 2013 | Towson |
| | Nihja White | 12 | 2012 | Villanova |
| | Aaron Love | 12 | 2006 | Towson |
| | Brian Adam | 12 | 1977 | Villanova |
| 9 | Thyrick Pitts | 11 | 2021 | Richmond |
| | Phillip Thaxton | 11 | 2009 | Villanova |
| | Justin Long | 11 | 2004 | William & Mary |
| | Eddie Conti | 11 | 1998 | Maine |
| | Darrin Ferrell | 11 | 1990 | Navy |
| | Pete Ravettine | 11 | 1978 | Eastern Illinois |

=== Receiving yards ===
Career
| Rk | Player | Yards | Years |
|---|---|---|---|
| 1 | Eddie Conti | 3,737 | 1994 1995 1996 1997 1998 |
| 2 | Courtney Batts | 3,522 | 1994 1995 1996 1997 |
| 3 | Jamin Elliott | 3,068 | 1998 1999 2000 2001 |
| 4 | Aaron Love | 2,459 | 2005 2006 2007 2008 |
| 5 | Thyrick Pitts | 2,429 | 2017 2018 2019 2020 2021 2022 |
| 6 | Michael Johnson | 2,325 | 2011 2012 2013 2014 |
| 7 | Mark Duncan | 2,291 | 2006 2007 2008 2009 |
| 8 | Nihja White | 2,255 | 2009 2010 2011 2012 |
| 9 | David Boler | 2,108 | 2002 2003 2004 |
| 10 | Justin Long | 1,910 | 2002 2003 2004 |

Single season
| Rk | Player | Yards | Year |
|---|---|---|---|
| 1 | Eddie Conti | 1,712 | 1998 |
| 2 | Jamin Elliott | 1,317 | 2000 |
| 3 | James Anderson | 1,067 | 1987 |
| 4 | Courtney Batts | 1,048 | 1997 |
| 5 | Jay Hooks | 1,036 | 1979 |
| 6 | Michael Johnson | 1,035 | 2013 |
| 7 | Pete Ravettine | 1,026 | 1978 |
| 8 | Aaron Love | 1,009 | 2007 |
| 9 | Courtney Batts | 957 | 1995 |
| 10 | Mark Duncan | 916 | 2007 |

Single game
| Rk | Player | Yards | Year | Opponent |
|---|---|---|---|---|
| 1 | Eddie Conti | 354 | 1998 | Connecticut |
| 2 | Justin Long | 236 | 2004 | Maine |
| 3 | Eddie Conti | 234 | 1998 | Northeastern |
| 4 | Jamin Elliott | 220 | 2000 | Villanova |
| 5 | Pete Ravettine | 208 | 1978 | Middle Tennessee |
| 6 | Eddie Conti | 207 | 1998 | William & Mary |
| 7 | Courtney Batts | 206 | 1994 | West Chester |
| 8 | Darrin Ferrell | 198 | 1990 | Navy |
| 9 | Eddie Conti | 196 | 1998 | Maine |
| 10 | Sean Wilson | 185 | 2026 | Coastal Carolina |

=== Receiving touchdowns ===
Career
| Rk | Player | TDs | Years |
|---|---|---|---|
| 1 | Eddie Conti | 31 | 1994 1995 1996 1997 1998 |
| 2 | Courtney Batts | 27 | 1994 1995 1996 1997 |
| 3 | Thyrick Pitts | 23 | 2017 2018 2019 2020 2021 2022 |
| 4 | Jamin Elliott | 19 | 1998 1999 2000 2001 |
| 5 | James Anderson | 17 | 1987 1988 |
| 6 | Pat Walker | 15 | 1968 1969 1970 |
| | Dan Cooper | 15 | 1990 1991 1992 1993 |
| | David Boler | 15 | 2002 2003 2004 |
| | Justin Long | 15 | 2002 2003 2004 |
| 10 | Michael Johnson | 14 | 2011 2012 2013 2014 |
| | Jourdan Townsend | 14 | 2019 2020 2021 2022 2023 |
| | Ron Withelder | 14 | 1967 1968 1969 |

Single season
| Rk | Player | TDs | Year |
|---|---|---|---|
| 1 | Pat Walker | 12 | 1969 |
| 2 | Phil Lutz | 11 | 2024 |
| | James Anderson | 11 | 1987 |
| 4 | Eddie Conti | 10 | 1998 |
| | Thyrick Pitts | 10 | 2022 |
| 6 | Jay Hooks | 9 | 1979 |
| | Michael Johnson | 9 | 2013 |
| | Ron Withelder | 9 | 1968 |
| | Eddie Conti | 9 | 1995 |
| | Eddie Conti | 9 | 1996 |
| | David Boler | 9 | 2003 |

Single game
| Rk | Player | TDs | Year | Opponent |
|---|---|---|---|---|
| 1 | Courtney Batts | 4 | 1994 | West Chester |
| 2 | Chandler Harvin | 3 | 2022 | Saint Francis (PA) |
| | Thyrick Pitts | 3 | 2022 | Hampton |
| | Michael Johnson | 3 | 2013 | Wagner |
| | Eddie Conti | 3 | 1995 | William & Mary |
| | Pete Johnson | 3 | 1971 | New Hampshire |
| | Paul Mueller | 3 | 1965 | Lehigh |

== Total offense ==
Total offense is the sum of passing and rushing statistics. It does not include receiving or returns.

Unlike most FBS programs, Delaware does not publish a leaderboard for "touchdowns responsible for", defined as combined passing and rushing touchdowns, over any time frame (career, season, single-game).

=== Total offense yards ===
Career
| Rk | Player | Yards | Years |
|---|---|---|---|
| 1 | Bill Vergantino | 9,051 | 1989 1990 1991 1992 |
| 2 | Matt Nagy | 7,943 | 1997 1998 1999 2000 |
| 3 | Rich Gannon | 7,436 | 1984 1985 1986 |
| 4 | Joe Flacco | 7,122 | 2006 2007 |
| 5 | Trent Hurley | 6,820 | 2012 2013 2014 |
| 6 | Leo Hamlett | 6,313 | 1993 1994 1995 1996 |
| 7 | Andy Hall | 6,169 | 2002 2003 |
| 8 | Pat Devlin | 5,953 | 2009 2010 |
| 9 | Nolan Henderson | 5,537 | 2017 2018 2019 2020 2021 2022 |
| 10 | Nick Minicucci | 5,530 | 2023 2024 2025 |

Single season
| Rk | Player | Yards | Year |
|---|---|---|---|
| 1 | Joe Flacco | 4,285 | 2007 |
| 2 | Nick Minicucci | 3,916 | 2025 |
| 3 | Andy Hall | 3,474 | 2003 |
| 4 | Nolan Henderson | 3,365 | 2022 |
| 5 | Rich Gannon | 3,332 | 1986 |
| 6 | Matt Nagy | 3,316 | 2000 |
| 7 | Pat Devlin | 3,162 | 2010 |
| 8 | Sonny Riccio | 3,013 | 2004 |
| 9 | Leo Hamlett | 2,842 | 1995 |
| 10 | Joe Flacco | 2,837 | 2006 |

Single game
| Rk | Player | Yards | Year | Opponent |
|---|---|---|---|---|
| 1 | Matt Nagy | 537 | 1998 | Connecticut |
| 2 | Sonny Riccio | 450 | 2004 | Maine |
| 3 | Matt Nagy | 437 | 2000 | Villanova |
| 4 | Nick Minicucci | 435 | 2025 | Jacksonville State |
| 5 | Nick Minicucci | 428 | 2026 | Western Kentucky |
| 6 | Joe Flacco | 420 | 2007 | Navy |
| 7 | Joe Flacco | 413 | 2007 | New Hampshire |
| 8 | Pat Devlin | 409 | 2009 | Villanova |
| 9 | Nolan Henderson | 407 | 2022 | Rhode Island |
| 10 | Nick Minicucci | 405 | 2026 | Kennesaw State |

== Defense ==
=== Interceptions ===
Career
| Rk | Player | Ints | Years |
|---|---|---|---|
| 1 | George Schmitt | 22 | 1980 1981 1982 |
| 2 | Dorrell Green | 18 | 1994 1995 1996 1997 |
| 3 | Warren McIntire | 17 | 1989 1990 1991 1992 |
| 4 | Ken Lucas | 16 | 1985 1986 1987 |
| 5 | Anthony Walters | 15 | 2007 2008 2009 2010 |
| | Lou Reda | 15 | 1980 1981 1982 |
| | Ron Klein | 15 | 1968 1969 1970 |
| 8 | Bill Maley | 14 | 1980 1981 1982 |
| 9 | Bernie Ebersole | 13 | 1972 1973 1974 |
| | Joe Purzycki | 13 | 1967 1968 1969 |

Single season
| Rk | Player | Ints | Year |
|---|---|---|---|
| 1 | George Schmitt | 13 | 1982 |
| 2 | Ken Lucas | 9 | 1986 |
| | Joe Purzycki | 9 | 1969 |
| | Warren McIntire | 9 | 1991 |
| 5 | Bruce Fad | 8 | 1969 |
| 6 | Bob Pietuszka | 7 | 1976 |
| | Ron Klein | 7 | 1970 |
| | Dorrell Green | 7 | 1996 |
| | Dan Mulhern | 7 | 1999 |
| | Anthony Walters | 7 | 2010 |

Single game
| Rk | Player | Ints | Year | Opponent |
|---|---|---|---|---|
| 1 | Warren McIntire | 3 | 1991 | Massachusetts |
| | Warren McIntire | 3 | 1992 | Towson |
| | Bud Haggerty | 3 | 1931 | Rutgers |
| | Ken Lucas | 3 | 1986 | Rhode Island |
| | Dan Mulhern | 3 | 1999 | Rhode Island |
| | George Schmitt | 3 | 1980 | Morgan State |
| | K. C. Keeler | 3 | 1978 | Jacksonville State |
| | Mike Randolph | 3 | 1977 | Colgate |
| | Ken Bills | 3 | 1964 | Buffalo |

=== Tackles ===
Career
| Rk | Player | Tackles | Years |
|---|---|---|---|
| 1 | Darrell Booker | 506 | 1984 1985 1986 1987 |
| 2 | Ralph D'Angelo | 433 | 1994 1995 1996 1997 |
| 3 | Dan Mulhern | 418 | 1999 2000 2001 2002 |
| 4 | Kenny Bailey | 414 | 1993 1994 1995 1996 |
| 5 | Paul Worrilow | 377 | 2009 2010 2011 2012 |
| 6 | Dorrell Green | 350 | 1994 1995 1996 1997 |
| 7 | Mondoe Davis | 342 | 2001 2002 2003 2004 |
| 8 | Brian McKenna | 341 | 1997 1998 1999 2000 |
| 9 | Pat Mulhern | 338 | 1991 1992 1993 1994 |
| 10 | Charles Bell | 335 | 2014 2015 2016 2017 2018 |

Single season
| Rk | Player | Tackles | Year |
|---|---|---|---|
| 1 | Darrell Booker | 153 | 1985 |
| 2 | Johnny Buchanan | 150 | 2022 |
| 3 | Ralph D'Angelo | 145 | 1995 |
| 4 | Darrell Booker | 144 | 1986 |
| 5 | Dan Mulhern | 142 | 2000 |
| 6 | Troy Reeder | 131 | 2018 |
| 7 | Brian Smith | 129 | 1996 |
| 8 | Dan Mulhern | 126 | 2002 |
| | Ralph D'Angelo | 126 | 1994 |
| 10 | Dorrell Green | 124 | 1994 |

Single game
| Rk | Player | Tackles | Year | Opponent |
|---|---|---|---|---|
| 1 | Johnny Buchanan | 23 | 2022 | Navy |
| | Darrell Booker | 23 | 1987 | West Chester |
| | Darrell Booker | 23 | 1985 | Temple |
| 4 | Ralph D'Angelo | 22 | 1995 | Navy |
| | Bryan Bossard | 22 | 1988 | Navy |
| 6 | Erik Johnson | 20 | 2007 | Navy |
| | Tony Hubbard | 20 | 1989 | William & Mary |
| | Darrell Booker | 20 | 1985 | Navy |
| 9 | Johnny Buchanan | 19 | 2022 | William & Mary |
| | Dan Mulhern | 19 | 2000 | New Hampshire |
| | Ralph D'Angelo | 19 | 1997 | Georgia Southern |
| | Sean Lenz | 19 | 1994 | William & Mary |
| | Ralph D'Angelo | 19 | 1994 | Lehigh |

=== Sacks ===
Career
| Rk | Player | Sacks | Years |
|---|---|---|---|
| 1 | Matt Morrill | 30.0 | 1990 1991 1992 1993 |
| 2 | John Levelis | 24.0 | 1986 1987 1988 |
| 3 | Joe McGrail | 23.0 | 1983 1984 1985 1986 |
| 4 | Chase McGowan | 22.0 | 2019 2020 2021 2022 2023 |
| 5 | Mike Cecere | 21.5 | 1997 1998 1999 2000 |
| 6 | Chuck Brice | 21.0 | 1983 1984 1985 |
| 7 | Denis Hulme | 20.5 | 1994 1995 1996 1997 |
| 8 | Mark Hrubar | 19.0 | 1989 1990 1991 |
| | Vaughn Dickinson | 19.0 | 1983 1984 1985 |
| 10 | Tom Parks | 18.5 | 2002 2003 2004 2005 |

Single season
| Rk | Player | Sacks | Year |
|---|---|---|---|
| 1 | Joe Quigg | 16.0 | 1983 |
| 2 | Shawn Johnson | 13.5 | 2003 |
| 3 | John Levelis | 13.0 | 1987 |
| 4 | Ron Rossi | 12.0 | 1981 |
| 5 | Matt Morrill | 11.0 | 1993 |
| | Jamie Bittner | 11.0 | 1980 |
| 7 | Tom Parks | 10.0 | 2004 |
| | Matt Morrill | 10.0 | 1992 |
| | John Levelis | 10.0 | 1988 |
| | Sam Miller | 10.0 | 1975 |

Single game
| Rk | Player | Sacks | Year | Opponent |
|---|---|---|---|---|
| 1 | Jamie Bittner | 6.0 | 1980 | Villanova |
| 2 | John Levelis | 4.0 | 1988 | New Hampshire |
| | Joe Quigg | 4.0 | 1983 | Massachusetts |
| 4 | Chase McGowan | 3.0 | 2020 | Rhode Island |
| | Vince Hollerman | 3.0 | 2014 | Delaware State |
| | Matt Marcorelle | 3.0 | 2007 | Towson |
| | Denis Hulme | 3.0 | 1995 | West Chester |
| | Matt Morrill | 3.0 | 1992 | Marshall |
| | Rob McMullen | 3.0 | 1989 | UMass |
| | Jim Borkowski | 3.0 | 1987 | West Chester |
| | Chuck Brice | 3.0 | 1983 | West Chester |
| | Chuck Brice | 3.0 | 1983 | Massachusetts |
| | Joe Quigg | 3.0 | 1983 | Rhode Island |
| | Paul Brown | 3.0 | 1982 | Princeton |

== Kicking ==
=== Field goals made ===
Career
| Rk | Player | FGs | Years |
|---|---|---|---|
| 1 | Jon Striefsky | 41 | 2005 2006 2007 2008 2009 |
| | Frank Raggo | 41 | 2015 2016 2017 2018 |
| 3 | Sean Baner | 39 | 2010 2011 2012 2013 |
| 4 | Sean Leach | 32 | 1994 1995 1996 1997 |
| | Brad Shushman | 32 | 2002 2003 2004 |
| | Nate Reed | 32 | 2023 2024 2025 |
| 7 | Scott Collins | 28 | 2000 2001 2002 |
| 8 | Ryan Coe | 26 | 2019 2020 2021 |
| | K. C. Knobloch | 26 | 1980 1981 1982 |
| 10 | Don O'Brien | 23 | 1987 1988 1989 |

Single season
| Rk | Player | FGs | Year |
|---|---|---|---|
| 1 | Jon Striefsky | 21 | 2007 |
| 2 | Mike Perry | 20 | 2010 |
| 3 | Sean Baner | 18 | 2012 |
| | Nate Reed | 18 | 2025 |
| 5 | Brad Shushman | 17 | 2003 |
| 6 | Sean Baner | 15 | 2011 |
| | Brad Shushman | 15 | 2004 |
| 8 | Ryan Coe | 14 | 2021 |
| | Scott Collins | 14 | 2000 |
| 10 | Jon Striefsky | 13 | 2009 |

Single game
| Rk | Player | FGs | Year | Opponent |
|---|---|---|---|---|
| 1 | Nate Reed | 4 | 2025 | UTEP |
| | Nate Reed | 4 | 2025 | Louisiana Tech |
| | Frank Raggo | 4 | 2015 | Lafayette |
| | Sean Baner | 4 | 2012 | Bucknell |
| | Sean Baner | 4 | 2011 | Old Dominion |
| | Sean Baner | 4 | 2011 | Villanova |
| | Jon Striefsky | 4 | 2009 | Navy |
| 8 | 24 times | 3 | Most recent: Nate Reed, 2025 vs. Liberty | |

=== Field goal percentage ===
Career
| Rk | Player | FG% | Years |
|---|---|---|---|
| 1 | Jon Striefsky | 80.4% | 2005 2006 2007 2008 2009 |
| 2 | Mike Perry | 76.9% | 2008 2009 2010 |
| 3 | Ryan Coe | 76.5% | 2019 2020 2021 |
| 4 | Nate Reed | 74.4% | 2023 2024 2025 |
| 5 | Sean Baner | 70.9% | 2010 2011 2012 2013 |
| 6 | Brad Shushman | 69.6% | 2002 2003 2004 |
| 7 | Frank Raggo | 69.5% | 2015 2016 2017 2018 |
| 8 | Mark Drozic | 68.1% | 1990 1991 |
| | Zach Hobby | 68.1% | 2005 2006 |
| 10 | Garon Sizemore | 64.0% | 1998 1999 |

Single season
| Rk | Player | FG% | Year |
|---|---|---|---|
| 1 | John Gasson | 100.0% | 1984 |
| 2 | Jon Striefsky | 92.8% | 2009 |
| 3 | Jon Striefsky | 87.5 | 2007 |
| | Zach Hobby | 87.5% | 2005 |
| 5 | Sean Leach | 80.0% | 1995 |
| 6 | Sean Baner | 78.3% | 2012 |
| 7 | Nate Reed | 77.8% | 2023 |
| 8 | Mike Perry | 76.9% | 2010 |
| 9 | Sean Baner | 75.0% | 2011 |
| | Nate Reed | 75.0% | 2025 |
