= 2007 NCAA Division I Football Championship Game =

Postseason college football game

2007 NCAA Division I Football Championship
- FCS National Championship Game
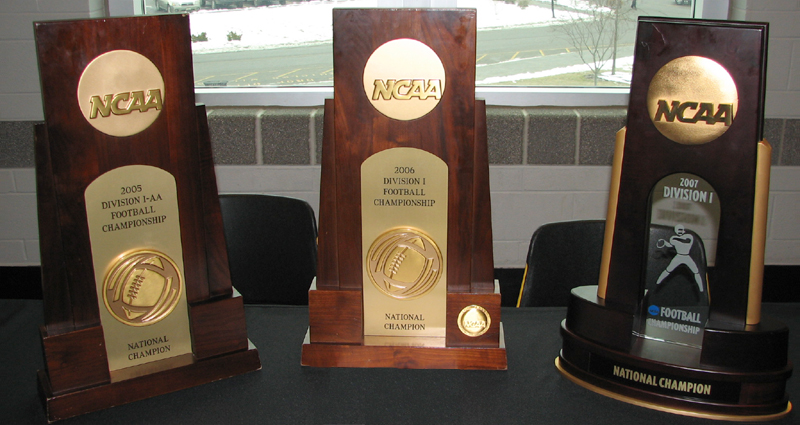
- 2007 FCS National Championship trophy (right)
Delaware Fightin' Blue Hens	Appalachian State Mountaineers
(11–3)	(12–2)
CAA	SoCon
21	49
Head coach: K. C. Keeler	Head coach: Jerry Moore
TSN / Seed; 13 / —	TSN / Seed; 5 / —
	1	2	3	4	Total
Delaware	0	7	7	7	21
Appalachian State	14	14	7	14	49
- Date: December 14, 2007
- Season: 2007
- Stadium: Finley Stadium
- Location: Chattanooga, Tennessee
- Referee: Andre Lowe (MEAC)
- Attendance: 23,010

United States TV coverage
- Network: ESPN2
- Announcers: Sean McDonough (play-by-play), Chris Spielman (color), Rob Stone (sideline)

The 2007 NCAA Division I Football Championship Game was a postseason college football game between the Appalachian State Mountaineers and the Delaware Fightin' Blue Hens. It was played on December 14, 2007, at Finley Stadium, home field of the University of Tennessee at Chattanooga. The culminating game of the 2007 NCAA Division I FCS football season, it was won by Appalachian State, 49–21.

== Teams ==
The participants of the Championship Game were the finalists of the 2007 FCS Playoffs, which began with a 16-team bracket.

=== Appalachian State Mountaineers ===
Appalachian State was bidding to win a third consecutive Division I-AA/Division I FCS championship after beating Northern Iowa in 2005 and Massachusetts in 2006. Their first game of the 2007 season was a 34–32 upset win over Michigan at Michigan Stadium after the Wolverines entered the year ranked No. 5 in the FBS and were such large favorites that no betting line was issued for the game. It marked the first victory for a Division I-AA/Division I FCS school over a Division I-A/Division I FBS ranked opponent. Appalachian State went on to finish their regular season with a 9–2 record (5–2 in conference) and also became the first FCS school to receive votes in the AP Poll. The Mountaineers defeated James Madison, Eastern Washington, and Richmond to reach the final.

=== Delaware Fightin' Blue Hens ===
Delaware finished their regular season with an 8–3 record (5–3 in conference). The Fightin' Blue Hens defeated Delaware State, top-seed Northern Iowa, and fourth-seed Southern Illinois to reach the final.

== Game summary ==
=== Scoring summary ===
Scoring summary

Quarter	Time	Drive			Team	Scoring information	Score	
Quarter	Time	Plays	Yards	TOP	Team	Scoring information	DEL	APP
1	10:47	6	58	3:05	APP	Kevin Richardson 19-yard touchdown reception from Armanti Edwards, Julian Rauch kick good	0	7
1	4:14	5	99	1:26	APP	Devon Moore 46-yard touchdown run, Rauch kick good	0	14
2	10:22	11	80	4:51	APP	Richardson (APP) fumble in the endzone recovered by Daniel Kilgore, Rauch kick good	0	21
2	1:10	6	40	1:46	DEL	Mark Duncan 39-yard touchdown reception from Joe Flacco, Jon Striefsky kick good	7	21
2	0:44	2	72	0:21	APP	Dexter Jackson 60-yard touchdown reception from Edwards, Rauch kick good	7	28
3	6:02	14	67	6:38	APP	Richardson 8-yard touchdown reception from Edwards, Rauch kick good	7	35
3	0:54	12	64	3:55	DEL	Omar Cuff 1-yard touchdown run, Striefsky kick good	14	35
4	6:02	10	87	5:00	APP	Richardson 6-yard touchdown run, Rauch kick good	14	42
4	3:29	1	53	0:10	APP	Trey Elder 53-yard touchdown run, Rauch kick good	14	49
4	3:18				DEL	Kickoff returned 75 yards for touchdown by Duncan, Striefsky kick good	21	49
"TOP" = time of possession. For other American football terms, see Glossary of American football.							21	49

=== Game statistics ===
	1	2	3	4	Total
No. 13 Fightin' Blue Hens	0	7	7	7	21
No. 5 Mountaineers	14	14	7	14	49

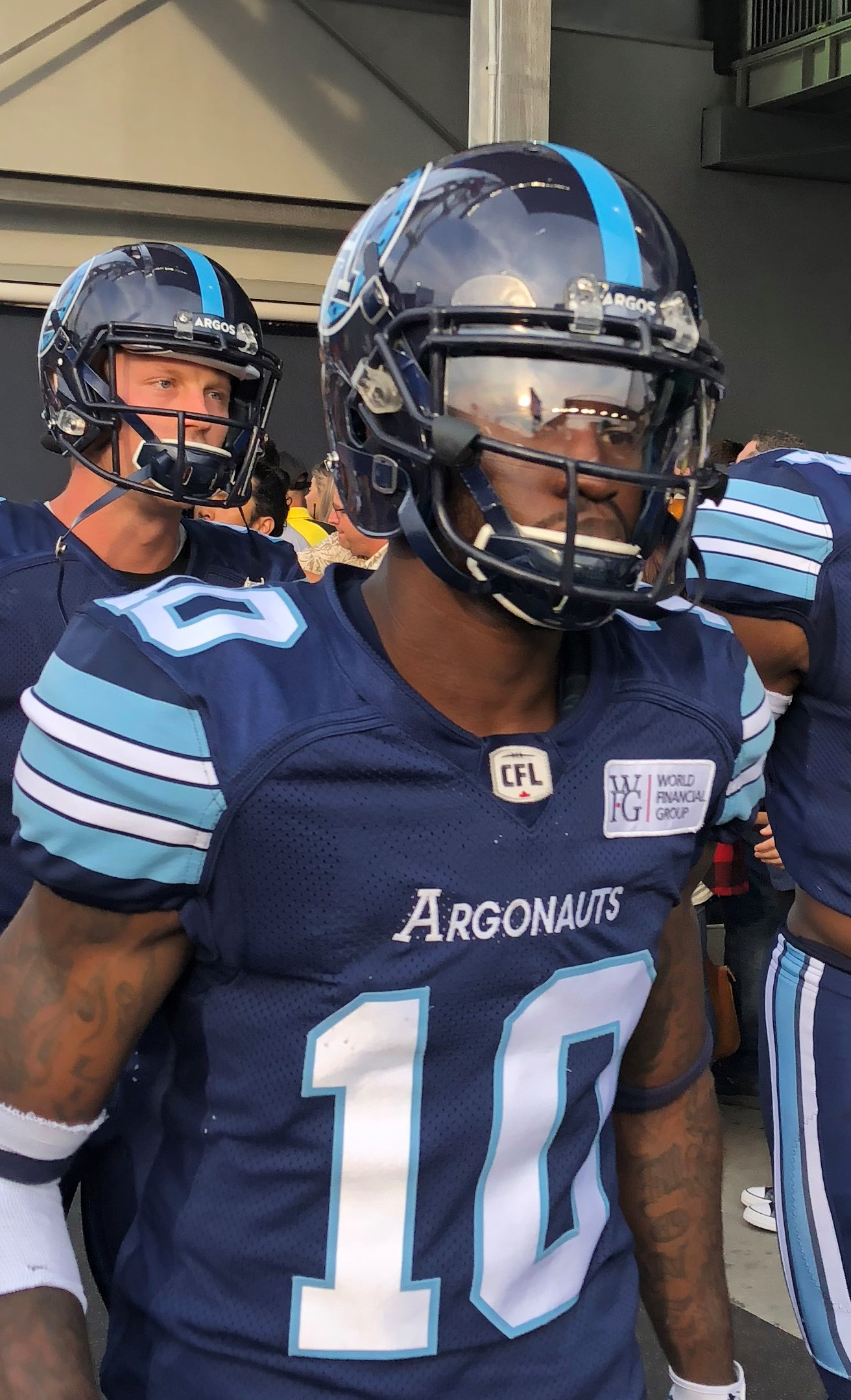
Appalachian State quarterback Armanti Edwards

Statistics	DEL	APP
First downs	24	26
Plays–yards	79–432	66–556
Rushes–yards	31–98	51–358
Passing yards	315	188
Passing: comp–att–int	23–48–0	9–15–0
Time of possession	27:53	32:07

Team	Category	Player	Statistics
Delaware	Passing	Joe Flacco	23–48, 334 yds, 1 TD
Delaware	Rushing	Omar Cuff	21 car, 84 yds, 1 TD
Delaware	Receiving	Aaron Love	7 rec, 101 yds
Appalachian State	Passing	Armanti Edwards	9–15, 198 yds, 3 TD
Appalachian State	Rushing	Kevin Richardson	22 car, 118 yds, 1 TD
Appalachian State	Receiving	Dexter Jackson	1 rec, 60 yds, 1 TD
