= 2024 Rhode Island Rams football team =

American college football season

2024 Rhode Island Rams football

CAA co-champion Lambert Cup winner

NCAA Division I Second Round, L 10–17 at Mercer
- Conference: CAA Football

Ranking
- STATS: No. 9
- FCS Coaches: No. 11
- Record: 11–3 (7–1 CAA)
- Head coach: Jim Fleming (11th season)
- Offensive coordinator: Patrick Murphy (5th season)
- Defensive coordinator: Chris Lorenti (2nd season)
- Home stadium: Meade Stadium

2024 Coastal Athletic Association Football Conference standings
	Conf.			Overall
Team	W		L	W		L
No. 15 Richmond +^	8	–	0	10	–	3
No. 9 Rhode Island* +^	7	–	1	11	–	3
No. 12 Villanova ^	6	–	2	10	–	4
Delaware*	6	–	2	9	–	2
No. 23 New Hampshire ^	6	–	2	8	–	5
Stony Brook	5	–	3	8	–	4
Towson	5	–	3	7	–	5
Elon	5	–	3	6	–	6
William & Mary	4	–	4	7	–	5
Monmouth	4	–	4	6	–	6
Maine	3	–	5	5	–	7
Albany	2	–	6	4	–	8
Hampton	2	–	6	5	–	7
Campbell	1	–	7	3	–	9
Bryant	0	–	8	2	–	10
North Carolina A&T	0	–	8	1	–	11
+ – Conference co-champions; ^ – FCS playoff participant; * Delaware ineligible for rankings and 2024 FCS playoffs due to transition to the FBS. Richmond and Rhode Island named co-champions as Rhode Island's only CAA loss was to Delaware.; Rankings from STATS Poll

The 2024 Rhode Island Rams football team represented the University of Rhode Island as a member of the Coastal Athletic Association Football Conference (CAA Football) during the 2024 NCAA Division I FCS football season. The Rams were led by 11th-year head coach Jim Fleming and played their home games at Meade Stadium.

After finishing their regular season with a 10–2 record (7–1 in CAA Football play), the Rams qualified for the NCAA postseason for the first time since 1985.

== Offseason ==
=== Coaching changes ===
The following coaches left the program:

- Wide receivers coach Chris Bergeski left for the running backs coach position at Yale.
- Offensive line coach Eddy Morrissey left for the co-offensive coordinator and offensive line coach positions at Merrimack.
- Defensive backs coach Brandon Napoleon left for the safeties coach position at Jacksonville State.

The following coaches were hired:

- Walter Kusmirek was hired from New Haven to be the offensive line coach.
- Tyler Loftus was hired from UConn to be the wide receivers coach.

The following coach was promoted:

- Defensive quality control coach Henry Yianakopolos was promoted to defensive backs coach.

=== Transfers ===
==== Incoming ====
Name	Pos.	Previous school	Year
Kevin Pinherio	WR	Nichols	Sophomore
Shawn Harris	WR	UMass	Redshirt Junior
Greg Gaines	WR	Iowa State	Redshirt Freshman
Hunter Helms	QB	Clemson	Redshirt Junior
Tyler Baker	QB	Navy	Freshman
Tremel States-Jones	S	South Alabama	Sophomore
Chase Gardi	K	Marist	Redshirt Senior
Thomas Buxton	OL	Stonehill	Senior
Carson Primose	DL	Sacred Heart	Graduate Student
Jalen Neal	DE	Boise State	Redshirt Junior

==== Outgoing ====
Name	Pos.	New school	Year
Hunter Hopperton	TE	Kent State	Sophomore
Declan Williams	LB	Incarnate Word	Sophomore
Mekhi Bethel	LB	Youngstown State	Junior
Rocco Cillino	RB	Retired	Redshirt Sophomore
Randy Jordan	DB	Hampton	Redshirt Junior
John Erby	WR	Duquesne	Redshirt Senior
Syeed Gibbs	DB	Georgia Tech	Redshirt Freshman
Trevor Nored	QB	Barton	Redshirt Freshman
Huriel Calice	LB	Allegheny	Freshman
Matthew Osinaga	DL	Post	Redshirt Sophomore
Jackson Ostrowsky	QB	Lock Haven	Junior
Kai Rose	OL	Stonehill	Redshirt Sophomore

== Schedule ==
Date	Time	Opponent	Rank	Site	TV	Result	Attendance
August 31	7:00 p.m.	Holy Cross*		Meade Stadium; Kingston, RI	FloSports	W 20–17	5,770
September 7	12:00 p.m.	at Minnesota*		Huntington Bank Stadium; Minneapolis, MN	Peacock	L 0–48	41,006
September 14	6:00 p.m.	Campbell		Meade Stadium; Kingston, RI	FloSports	W 21–9	4,840
September 21	12:00 p.m.	at LIU*		Bethpage Federal Credit Union Stadium; Brookville, NY	NEC Front Row	W 28–21	2,083
October 5	2:00 p.m.	at Hampton	No. 20	Armstrong Stadium; Hampton, VA	FloSports	W 46–44 ^{2OT}	1,729
October 12	1:00 p.m.	Brown*	No. 19	Meade Stadium; Kingston, RI (rivalry)	FloSports	W 31–21	5,773
October 19	1:00 p.m.	at No. 24 New Hampshire	No. 16	Wildcat Stadium; Durham, NH	FloSports	W 26–9	8,425
October 26	1:00 p.m.	Maine^{†}	No. 15	Meade Stadium; Kingston, RI	FloSports	W 24–14	5,450
November 2	1:00 p.m.	Monmouth	No. 14	Meade Stadium; Kingston, RI	FloSports	W 37–28	5,674
November 9	1:00 p.m.	at Delaware	No. 11	Delaware Stadium; Newark, DE	FloSports	L 21–24	17,326
November 16	1:00 p.m.	Albany	No. 15	Meade Stadium; Kingston, RI	FloSports	W 20–17	4,605
November 23	1:00 p.m.	at Bryant	No. 13	Beirne Stadium; Smithfield, RI	FloSports	W 35–21	2,850
November 30	12:00 p.m.	Central Connecticut*	No. 10	Meade Stadium; Kingston, RI (NCAA Division I First Round)	ESPN+	W 21–17	3,522
December 7	2:00 p.m.	at No. 8 Mercer*	No. 10	Fiver Star Stadium; Macon, GA (NCAA Division I Second Round)	ESPN+	L 10–17	8,012
*Non-conference game; ^{†}Homecoming; Rankings from STATS Poll released prior to the game; All times are in Eastern time

== Game summaries ==
=== Holy Cross ===
Game One – Holy Cross Crusaders (0–0) at Rhode Island Rams (0–0) – Game summary

Quarter	1	2	3	4	Total
Crusaders	0	3	0	14	17
Rams	3	3	7	7	20

at Meade Stadium • Kingston, Rhode Island

- Date: August 31, 2024
- Game time: 7:00 p.m.
- TV: FloSports

Game information

First quarter

- (9:00) URI – Ty Groff 27-yard field goal (Drive: 12 plays, 65 yards, 6:00; Rhode Island 3–0)

Second quarter

- (14:52) URI – Ty Groff 25-yard field goal (Drive: 11 plays, 49 yards, 5:32; Rhode Island 6–0)
- (5:29) HC – Daniel Porto 39-yard field goal (Drive: 4 plays, 6 yards, 1:30; Rhode Island 6–3)

Third quarter

- (3:42) URI – Tommy Smith 2-yard pass from Devin Farrell (Ty Groff kick) (Drive: 12 plays, 90 yards, 6:30; Rhode Island 13–3)

Fourth quarter

- (12:58) HC – Charly Mullaly 43-yard pass from Joe Pesansky (Daniel Porto kick) (Drive: 2 plays, 50 yards, 0:57; Rhode Island 13–10)
- (1:47) HC – Jordan Fuller 4-yard run (Daniel Porto kick) (Drive: 13 plays, 80 yards, 7:27; Holy Cross 17–13)
- (0:19) URI – Shawn Harris 31-yard pass from Devin Farrell (Ty Groff kick) (Drive: 12 plays, 75 yards, 1:28; Rhode Island 20–17)

Statistics	HC	URI
First downs	16	19
Total yards	271	396
Rushing yards	170	106
Passing yards	101	290
Passing: Comp–Att–Int	10-18-0	21-35-0
Time of possession	30:47	29:13

Team	Category	Player	Statistics
Holy Cross	Passing	Joe Pesansky	10/18, 101 yards, TD
Holy Cross	Rushing	Jordan Fuller	28 carries, 139 yards, TD
Holy Cross	Receiving	Charly Mullaly	1 reception, 43 yards, TD
Rhode Island	Passing	Devin Farrell	20/33, 287 yards, 2 TD
Rhode Island	Rushing	Devin Farrell	13 carries, 54 yards
Rhode Island	Receiving	Marquis Buchanan	4 receptions, 88 yards

=== at Minnesota (FBS) ===
Game Two – Rhode Island Rams (1–0) at Minnesota Golden Gophers (FBS) (0–1) – Game summary

Quarter	1	2	3	4	Total
Rams	0	0	0	0	0
Golden Gophers (FBS)	3	14	14	17	48

at Huntington Bank Stadium • Minneapolis, MN

- Date: Saturday September 7, 2024
- Game time: 11:00 AM
- Game weather: Sunny • Temperature: 59 °F (15 °C) • Wind S 4 mph
- Game attendance: 41,006
- Referee: Mark Kluczynski
- TV announcers (Peacock): Brendan Burke (play-by-play), Kyle Rudolph (analyst), and Caroline Pineda (sideline)

Game information

First quarter

- (9:27) MINN – Dragan Kesich 53-yard field goal (Drive: 7 plays, 44 yards, 3:26; Minnesota 3–0)

Second quarter

- (11:05) MINN – Darius Taylor 1-yard run (Dragan Kesich kick) (Drive: 13 plays, 83 yards, 6:33; Minnesota 10–0)
- (1:16) MINN – Marcus Major 2-yard run (Dragan Kesich kick) (Drive: 14 plays, 85 yards, 7:57; Minnesota 17–0)

Third quarter

- (7:57) MINN – Cristian Driver 6-yard pass from Max Brosmer (Dragan Kesich kick) (Drive: 12 plays, 73 yards, 6:58; Minnesota 24–0)
- (1:11) MINN – Le'Meke Brockington 29-yard pass from Max Brosmer (Drive: 8 plays, 79 yards, 4:40; Minnesota 31–0)

Fourth quarter

- (11:04) MINN – Dragan Kesich 47-yard field goal (Dragan Kesich kick) (Drive: 7 plays, 19 yards, 3:46; Minnesota 34–0)
- (10:32) MINN – Jack Henderson 25-yard interception return (Dragan Kesich kick (Drive: 3 plays, -8 yards, 0:32; Minnesota 41–0)
- (1:56) MINN – Tyler Williams 8-yard pass from Drake Lindsey (Dragan Kesich kick) (Drive: 7 plays, 55 yards, 4:12; Minnesota 48–0)

Statistics	URI	MINN
First downs	6	27
Total yards	135	422
Rushing yards	18	116
Passing yards	117	306
Passing: Comp–Att–Int	13–30–3	27–34–0
Time of possession	19:28	40:32

Team	Category	Player	Statistics
Rhode Island	Passing	Devin Farrell	6/18, 76 yards, 2 INT
Rhode Island	Rushing	Devin Farrell	4 carries, 9 yards
Rhode Island	Receiving	Marquis Buchanan	5 receptions, 64 yards
Minnesota	Passing	Max Brosmer	24/30, 271 yards, 2 TD
Minnesota	Rushing	Darius Taylor	14 carries, 64 yards, TD
Minnesota	Receiving	Elijah Spencer	4 receptions, 55 yards

=== Campbell ===
Game Three – Campbell Fighting Camels (1–1) at Rhode Island Rams (1–1) – Game summary

Quarter	1	2	3	4	Total
Fighting Camels	0	3	0	6	9
Rams	7	0	14	0	21

at Meade Stadium • Kingston, Rhode Island

- Date: September 14, 2024
- Game time: 6:00 p.m.
- TV: FloSports

Game information

First quarter

- (4:42) URI – Greg Gaines III 9-yard pass from Devin Farrell (Ty Groff kick) (Drive: 4 plays, 33 yards, 0:32; Rhode Island 7–0)

Second quarter

- (6:30) CAM – Connor Lytton 34-yard field goal (Drive: 6 plays, 30 yards, 2:17; Rhode Island 7–3)

Third quarter

- (10:50) URI – Devin Farrell 27-yard run (Ty Groff kick) (Drive: 8 plays, 77 yards, 4:06; Rhode Island 14–3)
- (4:59) URI – Marquis Buchanan 25-yard pass from Devin Farrell (Ty Groff kick) (Drive: 4 plays, 66 yards, 1:38; Rhode Island 21–3)

Fourth quarter

- (6:30) CAM – Sincere Brown 8-yard pass from Mike Chandler II (2-point conversion failed) (Drive: 12 plays, 86 yards, 6:08; Rhode Island 21–9)

Statistics	CAM	URI
First downs	23	12
Total yards	340	259
Rushing yards	140	131
Passing yards	200	128
Passing: Comp–Att–Int	28-39-0	14-21-0
Time of possession	35:56	24:04

Team	Category	Player	Statistics
Campbell	Passing	Chad Mascoe Jr.	22/31, 144 yards
Campbell	Rushing	Mike Chandler II	11 carries, 41 yards
Campbell	Receiving	Sincere Brown	7 receptions, 61 yards, TD
Rhode Island	Passing	Devin Farrell	14/21, 128 yards, 2 TD
Rhode Island	Rushing	Malik Grant	16 carries, 55 yards
Rhode Island	Receiving	Marquis Buchanan	4 receptions, 48 yards, TD

=== at LIU ===
Game Four – Rhode Island Rams (2–1) at LIU Sharks (0–3) – Game summary

Quarter	1	2	3	4	Total
Rams	0	7	0	21	28
Sharks	0	14	0	7	21

at Bethpage Federal Credit Union Stadium • Brookville, New York

- Date: September 21, 2024
- Game time: 12:00 p.m. EST
- Game weather: Sunny • Temperature: 73 °F (23 °C)
- Game attendance: 2,083
- Referee: Michael Quinn
- TV announcers (NEC Front Row): TBD

Game information

First quarter

- (11:45) URI – Malik Grant 7-yard run, Ty Groff kick (Drive: 4 plays, 58 yards, 1:38; Rhode Island 7–0)

Second quarter

- (9:16) LIU – Ludovick Choquette 28-yard pass from Luca Stanzani, Michael Coney kick (Drive: 8 plays, 60 yards, 4:15; Tied 7–7)
- (0:26) LIU – Luca Stanzani 7-yard run, Michael Coney kick (Drive: 6 plays, 23 yards, 1:43; LIU 14–7)

Third quarter

No scoring plays

Fourth quarter

- (11:35) URI – Malik Grant 11-yard run, Ty Groff kick (Drive: 9 plays, 80 yards, 4:19; Tied 14–14)
- (9:13) LIU – Michael Love 42-yard pass from Luca Stanzani, Michael Coney kick (Drive: 4 plays, 68 yards, 2:15; LIU 21–14)
- (3:43) URI – Hunter Helms 4-yard run, Ty Groff kick (Drive: 2 plays, 5 yards, 0:41; Tied 21–21)
- (1:08) URI – Malik Grant 8-yard run, Ty Groff kick (Drive: 7 plays, 67 yards, 1:37; Rhode Island 28–21)

Statistics	URI	LIU
First downs	21	20
Total yards	344	371
Rushing yards	210	174
Passing yards	134	197
Passing: Comp–Att–Int	11–19–0	19–32–0
Time of possession	22:38	37:22

Team	Category	Player	Statistics
Rhode Island	Passing	Hunter Helms	7/10, 90 yards
Rhode Island	Rushing	Malik Grant	20 carries, 141 yards, 3 TD
Rhode Island	Receiving	Greg Gaines	4 receptions, 44 yards
LIU	Passing	Luca Stanzani	16/27, 176 yards, 2 TD
LIU	Rushing	Ludovick Choquette	16 carries, 70 yards
LIU	Receiving	Michael Love	6 receptions, 77 yards, TD

=== at Hampton ===
Game Five – No. 20 Rhode Island Rams (3–1) at Hampton Pirates (3–2) – Game summary

Quarter	1	2	3	4	OT	2OT	Total
No. 20 Rams	3	7	7	14	7	8	46
Pirates	10	7	7	7	7	6	44

at Armstrong Stadium, Hampton, VA

- Date: Saturday October 5, 2024
- Game time: 2:00 p.m.
- TV: FloSports

Game information

First quarter

- (5:05) URI – Ty Groff 33-yard field goal (Drive: 10 plays, 30 yards, 4:47; Rhode Island 3–0)
- (0:12) HAMP – Brian Csehoski 32-yard field goal (Drive: 10 plays, 59 yards, 4:53; Tied 3–3)
- (0:00) HAMP – Christopher Eaton Jr. 16-yard fumble return (Brian Csehoski kick) (Drive: 1 play, -6 yards, 0:05; Hampton 10–3)

Second quarter

- (9:06) URI – Deon Silas 31-yard run (Ty Groff kick) (Drive: 4 plays, 54 yards, 1:23; Tied 10–10)
- (1:56) HAMP – Malcolm Mays 2-yard run (Brian Csehoski kick) (Drive: 9 plays, 81 yards, 3:26; Hampton 17–10)

Third quarter

- (1:52) HAMP – Brennan Ridley 57-yard pass from Malcolm Mays (Brian Csehoski kick) (Drive: 6 plays, 80 yards, 2:55; Hampton 24–10)
- (1:10) URI – Deon Silas 14-yard run (Ty Groff kick) (Drive: 2 plays, 70 yards, 0:37; Hampton 24–17)

Fourth quarter

- (7:02) HAMP – Tymere Robinson 2-yard pass from Malcolm Mays (Brian Csehoski kick) (Drive: 17 plays, 75 yards, 9:08; Hampton 31–17)
- (5:56) URI – Marquis Buchanan 41-yard pass from Devin Farrell (Ty Groff kick) (Drive: 3 plays, 87 yards, 1:00; Hampton 31–24)
- (0:24) URI – Malik Grant 2-yard run (Ty Groff kick) (Drive: 10 plays, 81 yards, 3:45; Tied 31–31)

Overtime

- (0:00) HAMP – Tyler Hatcher 25-yard pass from Malcolm Mays (Brian Csehoski kick) (Drive: 3 plays, 25 yards; Hampton 38–31)
- (0:00) URI – Greg Gaines III 12-yard pass from Devin Farrell (Ty Groff kick) (Drive: 1 play, 25 yards; Tied 38–38)

Second Overtime

- (0:00) HAMP – Brennan Ridley 8-yard pass from Malcolm Mays (2-point pass conversion failed) (Drive: 5 plays, 25 yards; Hampton 44–38)
- (0:00) URI – Devin Farrell 2-yard run (Devin Farrell run for 2-point conversion) (Drive: 4 plays, 25 yards; Rhode Island 46–44)

Statistics	URI	HAMP
First downs	30	22
Total yards	544	438
Rushing yards	273	172
Passing yards	271	266
Passing: Comp–Att–Int	17-33-2	25-31-1
Time of possession	24:29	35:31

Team	Category	Player	Statistics
Rhode Island	Passing	Devin Farrell	14/25, 247 yards, 2 TD, INT
Rhode Island	Rushing	Malik Grant	20 carries, 180 yards, TD
Rhode Island	Receiving	Marquis Buchanan	5 receptions, 75 yards, TD
Hampton	Passing	Malcolm Mays	24/28, 253 yards, 4 TD
Hampton	Rushing	Elijah Burris	13 carries, 52 yards
Hampton	Receiving	Brennan Ridley	8 receptions, 121 yards, 2 TD

=== Brown (rivalry) ===
Game Six – Brown Bears (2–1) vs No. 19 Rhode Island Rams (4–1) – Game summary

Quarter	1	2	3	4	Total
Bears	7	7	7	0	21
No. 19 Rams	14	0	3	14	31

at Meade Stadium • Kingston, RI

- Date: Saturday October 12, 2024
- Game time: 1:00 PM EST
- Game weather: Sunny
- Game attendance: 5,773
- Referee: Jeremy DeAngulo
- TV announcers (FloSports): TBD

Game information

First quarter

- (13:21) BRWN – Jordan DeLucia 4-yard run (Christopher Maron kick) (Drive: 1 play, 4 yards, 0:30; Brown 7–0)
- (6:52) URI – Marquis Buchanan 16-yard pass from Devin Farrell (Ty Groff kick) (Drive: 6 plays, 91 yards, 2:59; Tied 7–7)
- (0:28) URI – Malik Grant 2-yard run (Ty Groff kick) (Drive: 11 plays, 57 yards, 3:40; Rhode Island 14–7)

Second quarter

- (5:20) BRWN – Jake Willcox 7-yard run (Christopher Maron kick) (Drive: 11 plays, 66 yards, 5:08; Tied 14–14)

Third quarter

- (9:02) BRWN – Qwentin Brown 1-yard run (Christopher Maron kick) (Drive: 14 plays, 75 yards, 5:58; Brown 21–14)
- (1:38) URI – Ty Groff 20-yard field goal (Drive: 14 plays, 77 yards, 7:20; Brown 21–17)

Fourth quarter

- (12:22) URI – Shawn Harris Jr. 45-yard run (Ty Groff kick) (Drive: 2 plays, 66 yards, 0:37; Rhode Island 24–21)
- (2:49) URI – Devin Farrell 5-yard run (Ty Groff kick) (Drive: 9 plays, 80 yards, 5:55; Rhode Island 31–21)

Statistics	BRWN	URI
First downs	20	22
Total yards	298	434
Rushing yards	133	190
Passing yards	165	244
Passing: Comp–Att–Int	20–30–1	21–32–2
Time of possession	29:20	30:40

Team	Category	Player	Statistics
Brown	Passing	Jake Willcox	20/30, 165 yards, INT
Brown	Rushing	Matt Childs	12 carries, 48 yards
Brown	Receiving	Matt Childs	3 receptions, 52 yards
Rhode Island	Passing	Devin Farrell	21/32, 244 yards, TD, 2 INT
Rhode Island	Rushing	Devin Farrell	8 carries, 65 yards, TD
Rhode Island	Receiving	Marquis Buchanan	9 receptions, 107 yards, TD

=== at No. 24 New Hampshire ===
Game Seven – No. 16 Rhode Island Rams (5–1) at No. 24 New Hampshire Wildcats (4–2) – Game summary

Quarter	1	2	3	4	Total
No. 16 Rams	0	2	17	7	26
No. 24 Wildcats	0	3	0	6	9

at Wildcat Stadium, Durham, NH

- Date: Saturday October 19, 2024
- Game time: 1:00 p.m.
- Game weather: Sunny, 68 °F (20 °C)
- Game attendance: 8,425
- Referee: Henry Wimberg
- TV announcers (FloSports): Cooper Boardman (play-by-play) and Sean McDonnell (analyst)

Game information

First quarter

- No scoring plays

Second quarter

- (9:27) URI – Team safety (Drive: 3 plays, 3 yards, 1:30; Rhode Island 2–0)
- (0:23) UNH – Nick Mazzie 45-yard field goal (Drive: 11 plays, 57 yards, 5:02; New Hampshire 3–2)

Third quarter

- (9:43) URI – Ty Groff 20-yard field goal (Drive: 8 plays, 45 yards, 3:40; Rhode Island 5–3)
- (6:33) URI – Freddie Camp 1-yard fumble return (Ty Groff kick) (Drive: 3 plays, 62 yards, 0:48; Rhode Island 12–3)
- (0:13) URI – Marquis Buchanan 57-yard pass from Devin Farrell (Ty Groff kick) (Drive: 7 plays, 85 yards, 2:59; Rhode Island 19–3)

Fourth quarter

- (4:02) URI – Tommy Smith 3-yard run (Ty Groff kick) (Drive: 3 plays, 25 yards, 1:24; Rhode Island 26–3)
- (0:29) UNH – Logan Tomlinson 13-yard pass from Matt Vezza (2-point pass conversion failed) (Drive: 12 plays, 67 yards, 3:26; Rhode Island 26–9)

Statistics	URI	UNH
First downs	12	14
Total yards	318	235
Rushing yards	171	20
Passing yards	147	215
Passing: Comp–Att–Int	10-23-1	28-42-1
Time of possession	30:37	29:23

Team	Category	Player	Statistics
Rhode Island	Passing	Devin Farrell	10/23, 147 yards, TD, INT
Rhode Island	Rushing	Malik Grant	25 carries, 127 yards
Rhode Island	Receiving	Marquis Buchanan	4 receptions, 62 yards, TD
New Hampshire	Passing	Seth Morgan	17/29, 131 yards, INT
New Hampshire	Rushing	Isaac Seide	17 carries, 39 yards
New Hampshire	Receiving	Logan Tomlinson	8 receptions, 57 yards, TD

=== Maine ===
Game Eight – Maine Black Bears (3–4) vs No. 15 Rhode Island Rams (6–1) – Game summary

Quarter	1	2	3	4	Total
Black Bears	7	0	0	7	14
No. 15 Rams	0	14	0	10	24

at Meade Stadium • Kingston, RI

- Date: Saturday October 26, 2024
- Game time: 1:00 PM EST
- Game weather: 60 °F (16 °C)
- Game attendance: 5,450
- TV announcers (FloSports): TBD

Game information

First quarter

- (0:53) ME – Cooper Heisey 7-yard pass from Carter Peevy (Joey Bryson kick) (Drive: 12 plays, 90 yards, 7:01; Maine 7–0)

Second quarter

- (7:24) URI – Devin Farrell 1-yard run (Ty Groff kick) (Drive: 5 plays, 56 yards, 1:44; Tied 7–7)
- (1:14) URI – Devin Farrell 6-yard run (Ty Groff kick) (Drive: 9 plays, 41 yards, 4:36; Rhode Island 14–7)

Third quarter

- No scoring plays

Fourth quarter

- (14:56) ME – Brian Santana-Fis 4-yard run (Joey Bryson kick) (Drive: 9 plays, 43 yards, 5:14; Tied 14–14)
- (12:25) URI – Malik Grant 1-yard run (Ty Groff kick) (Drive: 6 plays, 61 yards, 2:28; Rhode Island 21–14)
- (6:04) URI – Ty Groff 35-yard field goal (Drive: 8 plays, 39 yards, 4:19; Rhode Island 24–14)

Statistics	ME	URI
First downs	17	14
Total yards	336	321
Rushing yards	57	119
Passing yards	279	202
Passing: Comp–Att–Int	29–39–0	13–24–0
Time of possession	34:13	25:47

Team	Category	Player	Statistics
Maine	Passing	Carter Peevy	29/39, 279 yards, TD
Maine	Rushing	Brian Santana-Fis	15 carries, 89 yards, TD
Maine	Receiving	Montigo Moss	9 receptions, 80 yards
Rhode Island	Passing	Devin Farrell	13/24, 202 yards
Rhode Island	Rushing	Malik Grant	22 carries, 87 yards, TD
Rhode Island	Receiving	Tommy Smith	3 receptions, 59 yards

=== Monmouth ===
Game Nine – Monmouth Hawks (4–4) at No. 14 Rhode Island Rams (7–1) – Game summary

Quarter	1	2	3	4	Total
Hawks	14	7	7	0	28
No. 14 Rams	7	10	7	13	37

at Meade Stadium • Kingston, RI

- Date: Saturday November 2, 2024
- Game time: 1:00 PM EST
- Game weather: Sunny, 60 °F (16 °C)
- Game attendance: 5,674
- Referee: Bill McKeever
- TV announcers (FloSports): Stone Freeman (play-by-play) and Montaner Fresilli (analyst)

Game information

First quarter

- (8:46) MONM – Sone Ntoh 7-yard run (Michael Calton Jr. kick) (Drive: 9 plays, 35 yards, 3:39; Monmouth 7–0)
- (4:25) URI – Marquis Buchanan 28-yard pass from Devin Farrell (Ty Groff kick) (Drive: 8 plays, 88 yards, 4:15; Tied 7–7)
- (0:33) MONM – Jack Neri 4-yard pass from Derek Robertson (Michael Calton Jr. kick) (Drive: 11 plays, 67 yards, 3:45; Monmouth 14–7)

Second quarter

- (8:27) URI – Ty Groff 29-yard field goal (Drive: 14 plays, 57 yards, 7:00; Monmouth 14–10)
- (3:09) MONM – Sone Ntoh 2-yard run (Michael Calton Jr. kick) (Drive: 12 plays, 84 yards, 5:13; Monmouth 21–10)
- (1:54) URI – Tommy Smith 29-yard pass from Devin Farrell (Ty Groff kick) (Drive: 4 plays, 62 yards, 1:07; Monmouth 21–17)

Third quarter

- (11:40) MONM – Tra Neal 11-yard pass from Derek Robertson (Michael Calton Jr. kick) (Drive: 3 plays, 25 yards, 0:53; Monmouth 28–17)
- (1:44) URI – Malik Grant 16-yard run (Ty Groff kick) (Drive: 4 plays, 65 yards, 1:15; Monmouth 28–24)

Fourth quarter

- (1:17) URI – Marquis Buchanan 24-yard pass from Devin Farrell (Ty Groff kick) (Drive: 8 plays, 69 yards, 1:52; Rhode Island 31–28)
- (0:00) URI – Frederick Mallay 7-yard fumble return (Drive: 2 plays, -2 yards, 0:14; Rhode Island 37–28)

Statistics	MON	URI
First downs	24	29
Total yards	335	476
Rushing yards	69	211
Passing yards	266	265
Passing: Comp–Att–Int	28-43-0	20-25-2
Time of possession	28:38	31:22

Team	Category	Player	Statistics
Monmouth	Passing	Derek Robertson	28/43, 266 yards, 2 TD
Monmouth	Rushing	Rodney Nelson	13 carries, 46 yards
Monmouth	Receiving	Josh Derry	6 receptions, 100 yards
Rhode Island	Passing	Devin Farrell	20/25, 265 yards, 3 TD, 2 INT
Rhode Island	Rushing	Malik Grant	25 carries, 126 yards, TD
Rhode Island	Receiving	Marquis Buchanan	12 receptions, 171 yards, 2 TD

=== at Delaware ===
Game Ten – No. 11 Rhode Island Rams (8–1) at Delaware Fightin' Blue Hens (7–1) – Game summary

Quarter	1	2	3	4	Total
No. 11 Rams	14	0	0	7	21
Fightin' Blue Hens	7	10	7	0	24

at Delaware Stadium, Newark, DE

- Date: Saturday November 9, 2024
- Game time: 1:00 p.m.
- Game weather: Sunny
- Game attendance: 17,326
- Referee: Todd Boyd
- TV announcers (FloSports): Matt Janus (play-by-play) and Thyrick Pitts (analyst)

Game information

First quarter

- (6:43) DEL – Nick Minicucci 1-yard run (Nate Reed kick) (Drive: 7 plays, 92 yards, 3:22; Delaware 7–0)
- (1:45) URI – Marquis Buchanan 22-yard pass from Hunter Helms (Ty Groff kick) (Drive: 3 plays, 35 yards, 0:50; Tied 7–7)
- (1:32) URI – Devin Hightower 21-yard fumble return (Ty Groff kick) (Drive: 1 play, -2 yards, 0:07; Rhode Island 14–7)

Second quarter

- (13:36) DEL – Marcus Yarns 27-yard run (Nate Reed kick) (Drive: 6 plays, 71 yards, 2:51; Tied 14–14)
- (0:23) DEL – Nate Reed 25-yard field goal (Drive: 14 plays, 68 yards, 6:11; Delaware 17–14)

Third quarter

- (3:56) DEL – Jake Thaw 7-yard pass from Nick Minicucci (Nate Reed kick) (Drive: 12 plays, 50 yards, 5:06; Delaware 24–14)

Fourth quarter

- (6:23) URI – Greg Gaines III 20-yard pass from Hunter Helms (Ty Groff kick) (Drive: 9 plays, 74 yards, 2:51; Delaware 24–21)

Statistics	URI	DEL
First downs	16	21
Total yards	300	390
Rushing yards	89	203
Passing yards	211	187
Passing: Comp–Att–Int	17–27–1	25–34–0
Time of possession	23:06	36:54

Team	Category	Player	Statistics
Rhode Island	Passing	Hunter Helms	15/23, 181 yards, 2 TD, INT
Rhode Island	Rushing	Malik Grant	12 carries, 64 yards
Rhode Island	Receiving	Marquis Buchanan	5 receptions, 85 yards, TD
Delaware	Passing	Nick Minicucci	25/34, 187 yards, TD
Delaware	Rushing	Marcus Yarns	23 carries, 174 yards, TD
Delaware	Receiving	Phil Lutz	5 receptions, 89 yards

=== Albany ===
Game Eleven – Albany Great Danes (3–7) at No. 15 Rhode Island Rams (8–2) – Game summary

Quarter	1	2	3	4	Total
Great Danes	10	7	0	0	17
No. 15 Rams	0	0	13	7	20

at Meade Stadium • Kingston, RI

- Date: Saturday November 16, 2024
- Game time: 1:00 PM EST
- Game weather: Sunny
- Game attendance: 4,605
- Referee: Paul Overton
- TV announcers (FloSports): TBD

Game information

First quarter

- (10:06) ALB – John Opalko 38-yard field goal (Drive: 12 plays, 37 yards, 4:48; Albany 3–0)
- (0:40) ALB – Alex Jreige 6-yard pass from Van Weber (John Opalko kick) (Drive: 17 plays, 79 yards, 7:14; Albany 10–0)

Second quarter

- (0:23) ALB – Seven McGee 25-yard pass from Van Weber (John Opalko kick) (Drive: 6 plays, 80 yards, 0:47; Albany 17–0)

Third quarter

- (13:51) URI – Malik Grant 42-yard run (Ty Groff kick) (Drive: 3 plays, 64 yards, 1:04; Albany 17–7)
- (2:44) URI – Malik Grant 1-yard run (PAT blocked) (Drive: 9 plays, 72 yards, 4:18; Albany 17–13)

Fourth quarter

- (9:36) URI – Malik Grant 7-yard run (Ty Groff kick) (Drive: 4 plays, 59 yards, 1:34; Rhode Island 20–17)

Statistics	ALB	URI
First downs	24	20
Total yards	428	371
Rushing yards	75	123
Passing yards	353	248
Passing: Comp–Att–Int	31-51-2	13-26-2
Time of possession	35:43	24:17

Team	Category	Player	Statistics
Albany	Passing	Van Weber	31/51, 353 yards, 2 TD, 2 INT
Albany	Rushing	Alex Jreige	13 carries, 62 yards
Albany	Receiving	Levi Wentz	9 receptions, 138 yards
Rhode Island	Passing	Hunter Helms	13/26, 248 yards, 2 INT
Rhode Island	Rushing	Malik Grant	25 carries, 100 yards, 3 TD
Rhode Island	Receiving	Marquis Buchanan	6 receptions, 132 yards

=== at Bryant ===
Game Twelve – No. 13 Rhode Island Rams (9–2) at Bryant Bulldogs (2–9) – Game summary

Quarter	1	2	3	4	Total
No. 13 Rams	3	10	15	7	35
Bulldogs	0	14	0	7	21

at Beirne Stadium • Smithfield, RI

- Date: Saturday November 23, 2024
- Game time: 1:00 p.m.
- Game weather: Rain • Temperature: 44 °F (7 °C) • Wind NW 14 mph
- Game attendance: 2,850
- Referee: Alex Parrella
- TV: FloSports

Game information

First quarter

- (1:32) URI – Ty Groff 25-yard field goal (Drive: 11 plays, 49 yards, 4:42; Rhode Island 3–0)

Second quarter

- (14:50) URI – Ty Groff 38-yard field goal (Drive: 4 plays, 3 yards, 0:40; Rhode Island 6–0)
- (10:02) BRY – Drew Montez 11-yard pass from Brennan Myer (Bryce Soli kick) (Drive: 9 plays, 65 yards, 4:48; Bryant 7–6)
- (4:38) URI – Malik Grant 13-yard run (Ty Groff kick) (Drive: 10 plays, 65 yards, 5:24; Rhode Island 13–7)
- (2:03) BRY – Dylan Kedzior 50-yard run (Bryce Soli kick) (Drive: 6 plays, 70 yards, 2:28; Bryant 14–13)

Third quarter

- (11:28) URI – Malik Grant 4-yard pass from Hunter Helms (Ty Groff kick) (Drive: 6 plays, 60 yards, 3:23; Rhode Island 20–14)
- (6:07) URI – Malik Grant 1-yard run (Marquis Buchanan run from 2-point conversion) (Drive: 6 plays, 47 yards, 3:12; Rhode Island 28–14)

Fourth quarter

- (11:05) BRY – Landon Ruggieri 14-yard pass from Brennan Myer (Bryce Soli kick) (Drive: 18 plays, 88 yards, 9:51; Rhode Island 28–21)
- (2:43) URI – Malik Grant 2-yard run (Ty Groff kick) (Drive: 13 plays, 75 yards, 8:22; Rhode Island 35–21)

Statistics	URI	BRY
First downs	26	16
Total yards	425	316
Rushing yards	216	104
Passing yards	209	212
Passing: Comp–Att–Int	19–29–1	18–30–2
Time of possession	34:55	25:05

Team	Category	Player	Statistics
Rhode Island	Passing	Hunter Helms	19/29, 209 yards, TD, INT
Rhode Island	Rushing	Malik Grant	37 carries, 204 yards, 3 TD
Rhode Island	Receiving	Marquis Buchanan	8 receptions, 84 yards
Bryant	Passing	Brennan Myer	15/24, 189 yards, 2 TD, 2 INT
Bryant	Rushing	Dylan Kedzior	10 carries, 80 yards, TD
Bryant	Receiving	Landon Ruggieri	8 receptions, 105 yards, TD

=== Central Connecticut (NCAA Division I playoff–first round) ===
Game Thirteen – Central Connecticut Blue Devils (7–5) at No. 10 Rhode Island Rams (10–2) – Game summary

Quarter	1	2	3	4	Total
Blue Devils	0	7	7	3	17
No. 10 Rams	14	0	0	7	21

at Meade Stadium • Kingston, RI

- Date: Saturday November 30, 2024
- Game time: 12:00 PM EST
- Game weather: Sunny
- Game attendance: 3,522
- Referee: Matthew Jones
- TV announcers (ESPN+): Doug Sherman (play-by-play) and Forrest Conoly (analyst)

Game information

First quarter

- (2:31) URI – Tommy Smith 38-yard pass from Hunter Helms (Ty Groff kick) (Drive: 8 plays, 80 yards, 3:36; Rhode Island 7–0)
- (2:17) URI – Emmanuel Gomes 42-yard interception return (Ty Groff kick) (Drive: 1 play, 0 yards, 0:10; Rhode Island 14–0)

Second quarter

- (7:25) CCSU – Isaac Boston 11-yard pass from Brady Olson (Jack Barnum kick) (Drive: 8 plays, 48 yards, 4:06; Rhode Island 14–7)

Third quarter

- (1:27) CCSU – Isaac Boston 6-yard pass from Brady Olson (Jack Barnum kick) (Drive: 6 plays, 75 yards, 3:25; Tied 14–14)

Fourth quarter

- (9:42) URI – Tommy Smith 6-yard run (Ty Groff kick) (Drive: 6 plays, 32 yards, 3:21; Rhode Island 21–14)
- (4:47) CCSU – Jack Barnum 32-yard field goal (Drive: 8 plays, 58 yards, 4:51; Rhode Island 21–17)

Statistics	CCSU	URI
First downs	13	19
Total yards	271	434
Rushing yards	123	226
Passing yards	148	208
Passing: Comp–Att–Int	11–23–3	18–28–2
Time of possession	28:21	31:39

Team	Category	Player	Statistics
Central Connecticut	Passing	Brady Olson	11/23, 148 yards, 2 TD, 3 INT
Central Connecticut	Rushing	Elijah Howard	19 carries, 101 yards
Central Connecticut	Receiving	Elijah Howard	3 receptions, 54 yards
Rhode Island	Passing	Hunter Helms	18/28, 208 yards, TD, 2 INT
Rhode Island	Rushing	Malik Grant	29 carries, 223 yards
Rhode Island	Receiving	Greg Gaines III	5 receptions, 71 yards

=== at No. 8 Mercer (NCAA Division I playoff–second round) ===
Game Fourteen – No. 10 Rhode Island Rams (11–2) at No. 8 Mercer Bears (10–2) – Game summary

Quarter	1	2	3	4	Total
No. 10 Rams	0	3	7	0	10
No. 8 Bears	7	0	0	10	17

at Five Star Stadium • Macon, GA

- Date: Saturday December 7, 2024
- Game time: 2:00 PM EST
- TV announcers (ESPN+): Michael Reghi, Forrest Conoly

Game information

First quarter

- (3:33) MER – Myles Redding 25-yard interception return (Reice Griffith kick) (Drive: 1 play, 0 yards, 0:08; Mercer 7–0)

Second quarter

- (0:00) URI – Ty Groff 17-yard field goal (Drive: 12 plays, 64 yards, 2:29; Mercer 7–3)

Third quarter

- (2:33) URI – Marquis Buchanan 56-yard pass from Hunter Helms (Ty Groff kick) (Drive: 1 play, 56 yards, 0:08; Rhode Island 10–7)

Fourth quarter

- (14:19) MER – Adjatay Dabbs 4-yard pass from Whitt Newbauer (Reice Griffith kick) (Drive: 7 plays, 69 yards, 3:07; Mercer 14–10)
- (6:10) MER – Reice Griffith 24-yard field goal (Drive: 8 plays, 58 yards, 4:05; Mercer 17–10)

Statistics	URI	MER
First downs	14	15
Total yards	315	242
Rushing yards	49	185
Passing yards	266	57
Passing: Comp–Att–Int	22-33-1	10-20-0
Time of possession	26:22	33:38

Team	Category	Player	Statistics
Rhode Island	Passing	Hunter Helms	22/33, 266 yards, TD, INT
Rhode Island	Rushing	Malik Grant	13 carries, 36 yards
Rhode Island	Receiving	Marquis Buchanan	11 carries, 119 yards, TD
Mercer	Passing	Whitt Newbauer	10/20, 57 yards, TD
Mercer	Rushing	Dwayne McGee	21 carries, 114 yards
Mercer	Receiving	Adjatay Dabbs	5 receptions, 23 yards, TD

== Rankings ==
Ranking movements Legend: ██ Increase in ranking ██ Decrease in ranking RV = Received votes
	Week														
Poll	Pre	1	2	3	4	5	6	7	8	9	10	11	12	13	Final
STATS FCS	RV	RV	RV	RV	22	20	19	16	15	14	11	15	13	10	9
Coaches	RV	RV	RV	RV	RV	25	21	17	16	14	10	18	15	12	11

== Roster ==
2024 Rhode Island Rams football team roster
Players
Coaches
Offense

Pos.	#	Name	Class
WR	1	Jamari Gassett	So
WR	4	Kareem Burke	GS
WR	5	Damani Wilks	Sr
WR	6	Kyle Thomas	Sr
QB	7	Devin Farrell	So
WR	8	Jake Cheeseman	So
WR	11	Brady Edwards	Jr
WR	14	Trevonte Rucker Jr.	Jr
WR	15	James Mallory	So
WR	16	DJ Epps	So
WR	17	Miles Williams	Fr
WR	17	Keron Milton	Jr
WR	18	Blake Youngblood	Sr
RB	20	E.J. Wilson	Sr
RB	21	Jamari Ferrell	So
RB	25	Omiri Wiggins	So
RB	28	Xavier Coleman	So
RB	42	Taven Curry	So
RB	52	Brenden Begeman	Jr
RB	60	Elijah Terry	So
RB	62	Max Wiegand	Fr
TE	63	Bryce Kennon	Fr
TE	65	Jalen Butler	Sr
TE	67	Andrew Bench	Sr
TE	68	Teagen Elizer	Fr
TE	70	Matt Gower	Jr
OL	72	Jacob Otts	Jr
TE	74	Charlie Baker	So
OL	75	Michael Marotta	Fr
OL	77	Finn Wilkins	So
OL	79	Nolan Gunning	Jr
OL	80	Cade Bennett	So
OL	81	Ryan Mitchell	Sr
OL	82	Jackson Kerstin	So
OL	83	Ed Haynes	So
OL	84	Caden Wischmeier	Sr
OL	85	Mason Harris	So
OL	86	Epharaim Ndonye	So
OL	87	Noah Stanley	Sr
OL	88	Emitt Harris	Jr
OL	89	Hunter Svoboda	Sr
OL	92	Rick Moore	Jr
OL	98	Nate Cole	So
OL	98	Ryan Hall	So

Defense

Pos.	#	Name	Class
DB	2	Jaden Shipley	Jr
DB	3	Marc Stampley II	Sr
DB	8	JuJu Ganthier	Jr
DB	9	Jo'Laison Landry	Sr
DB	10	Elijah Campbell	Sr
DB	13	Myles Bell Jr.	Jr
DB	15	Kayvun Gulley	Sr
DB	19	Braylon Prude	So
DB	22	Day Day Bright	Sr
DB	23	Kevin Lusardi	Jr
DB	24	Lamonte Burnett	Jr
DB	26	Tequan Clowney	Fr
DB	27	Montell Bandy	Sr
DB	29	Dontay Hunter	Jr
DB	30	Alex Broome	So
DB	31	Naz Bufkin	Fr
DB	32	Wyatt Oserbauer	Jr
DB	33	Max Wang	Jr
DB	34	Luke Webb	Fr
DB	35	Roman Kopel	So
DB	36	Luke Dempert	Fr
DL	37	Ajani Farmer	So
DL	38	Jayson Harris-Woodard	Fr
DL	39	RJ Stephens	Sr
DL	40	Nick Bilsbury	So
DL	43	Deondri Pirtle Jr.	Sr
DL	44	Andrew Lolohea	So
DL	50	Carter Menz	Fr
DL	51	Patrick Converse	So
LB	53	Moses Meus	So
LB	54	Emmanuel Dankwa	So
LB	55	Gage Hinkley	Fr
LB	57	Gabe Franco	So
LB	58	Thomas Kubera	Fr
LB	59	Paul Fuller	So
DB	73	Mason Tanner	Fr
LB	90	Gabe Salomons	Sr
DL	91	Terrell Spruill	Fr
DL	92	Tosin Akinsulire	So
DL	93	Bless Nyanneh	So
DL	94	Carson Primrose	GS
DL	96	Kareem Wilson Jr.	So
DL	97	Case Mankins	So
DL	99	Westley Neal Jr.	Sr

Special teams

Pos.	#	Name	Class
K	41	Dylan Shank	So
K/P	45	Ty Groff	So
K/P	46	Will Johnson	Fr
K	47	Adam Okonowicz	Fr
K	48	Chase Gardi	Sr
P	49	Devin Walter	So
LS	61	Dillon Keough	Fr
K	69	Drew Pietraszka	So
LS	95	Donato Crisanti	Sr

Head coach

- Jim Fleming

Coordinators/assistant coaches

- Patrick Murphy
  Offensive coordinator/quarterbacks
- Mike Flanagan
  Associate head coach/offensive line/run game coordinator/recruiting coordinator
- Adam Griggs
  Tight ends
- Luke Jenkins
  Running backs
- Tyler Loftus
  Wide receivers
- Dillon Costello
  Offensive quality control/wide receivers assistant
- Sebastian Delasoudas
  Offensive assistant
- John Fils-Aime
  Quarterbacks assistant/director of operations
- Aidan McClellan
  Offensive quality control/offensive line assistant/video coordinator
- Troy Gilmer
  Outside linebackers/special teams coordinator
- Brandon Holt
  Defensive assistant
- Marcell Lazard
  Defensive line
- Chris Lorenti
  Defensive coordinator/inside linebackers
- Justin Woodward
  Defensive quality control
- Henry Yiankapolos
  Defensive backs
- Jack Montefusco
  Assistant director of operations
- Vince Sinagra
  Chief of staff
- Mason Smoller
  Creative & digital coordinator
- Jeffrey Wosencroft
  General manager, front office & business strategy
- Robert Izzi
  Team chaplain

Legend

- (C) Team captain
- (S) Suspended
- (I) Ineligible
- Injured
- Redshirt

Roster
Last update: November 29, 2024

== Statistics ==
=== Team ===
	Rhode Island	Opp
Scoring		
Points per game		
Points per Turnovers		
First downs		
Rushing		
Passing		
Penalty		
Rushing yards		
Avg per play		
Avg per game		
Rushing touchdowns		
Passing yards		
Att-Comp-Int		
Avg per pass		
Avg per catch		
Avg per game		
Passing touchdowns		
Total offense		
Plays		
Avg per play		
Avg per game		
Fumbles-Lost		
Penalties-Yards		
Avg per game		

	Rhode Island	Opp
Punt-Yards		
Avg per play		
Avg per punt net		
Punt Return-Yards		
Avg per punt return		
Kickoffs-Yards		
Avg per play		
Avg per kick net		
Kickoff Return-Yards		
Avg per kickoff return		
Interceptions-Yards		
Avg per play		
Time of possession / game		
3rd down conversions (Pct%)	(0%)	(0%)
4th down conversions (Pct%)	(0%)	(0%)
Touchdowns scored		
Field goals-Attempts		
PAT-Attempts		
2 point conversion-attempts		
Sack by Yards		
Misc Yards		
Safeties		
Onside kicks		
Red zone scores	(0%)	(0%)
Red zone touchdowns	(0%)	(0%)
Attendance		
Date/Avg per date		
Neutral Site		

=== Individual leaders ===
Passing statistics
#	NAME	POS	RAT	CMP-ATT-INT	YDS	AVG/G	CMP%	TD	LONG
		QB	0.0	0-0-0	0 yrds		0.0%	0 TDs	0
	TOTALS		0.0	0-0-0	0 yrds	0.0	0.0%	0 TDs	0

Rushing statistics
#	NAME	POS	ATT	GAIN	AVG	TD	LONG	AVG/G
		RB	0	0 yrds	0.0	0 TDs	0	0.0
	TOTALS		0	0 yrds	0.0	0 TDs	0	0.0

Receiving statistics
#	NAME	POS	CTH	YDS	AVG	TD	LONG	AVG/G
		WR	0	0 yrds	0.0	0 TDs	0	0.0
	TOTALS		67	730 yrds	10.9	10 TDs	38	243.3

==== Defense ====
Defense statistics
#	NAME	POS	SOLO	AST	TOT	TFL-YDS	SACK-YDS	INT-YDS-TD	BU	QBH	RCV-YDS	FF	BLK	SAF
			0	0	0	0-0 yrds	0-0 yrds	-	-	-	-	-	-	-
	TOTAL		0	0	0	0-0 yrds	0-0 yrds	0-0 yrds- 0 TDs	0	0	-	0	0	-

Key: POS: Position, SOLO: Solo Tackles, AST: Assisted Tackles, TOT: Total Tackles, TFL: Tackles-for-loss, SACK: Quarterback Sacks, INT: Interceptions, BU: Passes Broken Up, PD: Passes Defended, QBH: Quarterback Hits, FR: Fumbles Recovered, FF: Forced Fumbles, BLK: Kicks or Punts Blocked, SAF: Safeties, TD : Touchdown

==== Special teams ====
Kicking/off statistics
#	NAME	POS	XPM-XPA (XP%)	FGM-FGA (FG%)	1–19	20–29	30–39	40–49	50+	PTS	LNG	KICKS	YDS	AVG	TB	OB
		PK	0-0 (0.0%)	0-0 (0.0%)	-/-	-/-	-/-	-/-	-/-	0 pts	0	0	0 yrds	0.0	0	-
	TOTALS		0-0 (0.0%)	0-0 (0.0%)	-/-	-/-	-/-	-/-	-/-	0	0	0	0 yrds	0.0	0	-

Punting statistics
#	NAME	POS	PUNTS	YDS	AVG	LONG	TB	FC	I–20	50+	BLK
		P	-	-	-	-	-	-	-	-	-
	Team	--	0	-	-	-	-	-	-	-	0
	TOTALS		0	0 yrds	0.0	0	0	0	0	0	1

Kick return statistics
#	NAME	POS	RTNS	YDS	AVG	TD	LNG
			-	-	-	-	-
	TOTALS		0	0 yrds	0.0	0 TD's	0

Punt return statistics
#	NAME	POS	RTNS	YDS	AVG	TD	LONG
			-	-	-	-	-
	TOTALS		0	0 yrds	0.0	0 TD's	0
