= 2024 Delaware Fightin' Blue Hens football team =

American college football season

2024 Delaware Fightin' Blue Hens football
- Conference: CAA Football Conference
- Record: 9–2 (6–2 CAA)
- Head coach: Ryan Carty (3rd season)
- Offensive coordinator: Terence Archer (1st season)
- Offensive scheme: Spread option
- Defensive coordinator: Manny Rojas (5th season)
- Base defense: 3–3–5
- Home stadium: Delaware Stadium

2024 Coastal Athletic Association Football Conference standings
	Conf.			Overall
Team	W		L	W		L
No. 15 Richmond +^	8	–	0	10	–	3
No. 9 Rhode Island* +^	7	–	1	11	–	3
No. 12 Villanova ^	6	–	2	10	–	4
Delaware*	6	–	2	9	–	2
No. 23 New Hampshire ^	6	–	2	8	–	5
Stony Brook	5	–	3	8	–	4
Towson	5	–	3	7	–	5
Elon	5	–	3	6	–	6
William & Mary	4	–	4	7	–	5
Monmouth	4	–	4	6	–	6
Maine	3	–	5	5	–	7
Albany	2	–	6	4	–	8
Hampton	2	–	6	5	–	7
Campbell	1	–	7	3	–	9
Bryant	0	–	8	2	–	10
North Carolina A&T	0	–	8	1	–	11
+ – Conference co-champions; ^ – FCS playoff participant; * Delaware ineligible for rankings and 2024 FCS playoffs due to transition to the FBS. Richmond and Rhode Island named co-champions as Rhode Island's only CAA loss was to Delaware.; Rankings from STATS Poll

The 2024 Delaware Fightin' Blue Hens football team represented the University of Delaware as a member of the Coastal Athletic Association Football Conference (CAA) during the 2024 NCAA Division I FCS football season. They were led by third-year head coach Ryan Carty and played their home games at Delaware Stadium in Newark, Delaware.

This was Delaware's final season in the CAA, as they moved into Conference USA and the Football Bowl Subdivision (FBS) prior to the 2025 season. As such, they were not eligible to participate in the 2024 FCS playoffs.

== Schedule ==
Date	Time	Opponent	Site	TV	Result	Attendance
August 29	7:00 p.m.	Bryant^{[note 1]}*	Delaware Stadium; Newark, DE	FloSports	W 48–17	17,244
September 14	1:00 p.m.	at North Carolina A&T	Truist Stadium; Greensboro, NC	FloSports	W 42–13	11,421
September 21	6:00 p.m.	Penn*	Delaware Stadium; Newark, DE	FloSports	W 29–22	17,848
September 28	3:30 p.m.	Sacred Heart*	Delaware Stadium; Newark, DE	FloSports	W 49–0	19,054
October 5	1:00 p.m.	at Monmouth	Kessler Stadium; West Long Branch, NJ	FloSports	W 42–35	3,374
October 12	1:00 p.m.	Maine	Delaware Stadium; Newark, DE	FloSports	W 44–21	15,564
October 19	3:30 p.m.	at No. 18 Richmond	E. Claiborne Robins Stadium; Richmond, VA	FloSports	L 9–28	5,382
October 26	3:00 p.m.	Albany^{†}	Delaware Stadium; Newark, DE	FloSports	W 28–14	17,847
November 9	1:00 p.m.	No. 11 Rhode Island	Delaware Stadium; Newark, DE	FloSports	W 24–21	17,326
November 16	1:00 p.m.	Campbell	Delaware Stadium; Newark, DE	FloSports	W 41–22	16,422
November 23	1:00 p.m.	at No. 15 Villanova	Villanova Stadium; Villanova, PA (Battle of the Blue)	FloSports	L 28–38	7,105
*Non-conference game; ^{†}Homecoming; Rankings from STATS Poll released prior to the game; All times are in Eastern time

^{[note 1]} The game against Bryant, a fellow member of the CAA, was played as a non-conference game and will not count in the league standings.

== Game summaries ==
=== Bryant ===
Bryant Bulldogs at Delaware Blue Hens – Game summary

Quarter	1	2	3	4	Total
Bulldogs	3	7	0	7	17
Fightin' Blue Hens	14	20	7	7	48

at Delaware Stadium, Newark, Delaware

- Date: August 29
- Game time: 7:00 p.m. EDT
- Game weather: Cloudy
- Game attendance: 17,244
- Referee: Todd Boyd
- TV announcers (FloSports): Jon Mozes (play-by-play) and Fritz Stueber (analyst)
- Box score, Recap

Game information

First quarter

- BRY – Bryce Soli 23-yard field goal, 7:00. Bulldogs 3–0. Drive: 11 plays, 58 yards, 5:20.
- DEL – Phil Lutz 16-yard pass from Ryan O'Connor (Nate Reed kick), 3:19. Blue Hens 7–3. Drive: 9 plays, 78 yards, 3:36.
- DEL – Marcus Yarns 1-yard run (Nate Reed kick), 2:12. Blue Hens 14–3. Drive: 1 play, 1 yard, 0:03.

Second quarter

- DEL – Marcus Yarns 3-yard pass from Ryan O'Connor (Nate Reed kick), 13:30. Blue Hens 21–3. Drive: 6 plays, 56 yards, 1:33.
- BRY – Marc Taglieri Jr. 4-yard pass from Jarrett Guest (Bryce Soli kick), 11:17. Blue Hens 21–10. Drive: 6 plays, 75 yards, 2:13.
- DEL – Jo'Nathan Silver 1-yard run (kick failed), 5:12. Blue Hens 27–10. Drive: 14 plays, 72 yards, 5:59.
- DEL – Nicholas Laboy 11-yard pass from Ryan O'Connor (Nate Reed kick), 0:43. Blue Hens 34–10. Drive: 6 plays, 35 yards, 1:37.

Third quarter

- DEL – Jalyn Witcher 8-yard pass from Ryan O'Connor (Nate Reed kick), 7:02. Blue Hens 41–10. Drive: 12 plays, 96 yards, 5:28.

Fourth quarter

- DEL – Saeed St. Fleur 25-yard run (Nate Reed kick), 12:42. Blue Hens 48–10. Drive: 7 plays, 74 yards, 2:30.
- BRY – Markiel Cockrell 7-yard run (Bryce Soli kick), 1:53. Blue Hens 48–17. Drive: 3 plays, 77 yards, 1:49.

Statistics	BRY	DEL
First downs	19	24
Total yards	319	428
Rushing yards	67	183
Passing yards	252	245
Turnovers	2	0
Time of possession	31:13	28:47

Team	Category	Player	Statistics
Bryant	Passing	Jarrett Guest	16/29, 146 yards, TD, INT
Bryant	Rushing	Fabrice Mukendi	9 rushes, 40 yards
Bryant	Receiving	Gary Cooper	4 receptions, 78 yards
Delaware	Passing	Ryan O'Connor	29/41, 245 yards, 4 TD
Delaware	Rushing	Marcus Yarns	12 rushes, 62 yards, TD
Delaware	Receiving	Max Patterson	5 receptions, 53 yards

=== at North Carolina A&T ===
Delaware Fightin' Blue Hens at North Carolina A&T Aggies – Game summary

Quarter	1	2	3	4	Total
Fightin' Blue Hens	12	9	14	7	42
Aggies	0	13	0	0	13

at Truist Stadium, Greensboro, North Carolina

- Date: September 14
- Game time: 1:00 p.m. EDT
- Game weather: Sunny, 77 °F (25 °C)
- Game attendance: 11,421
- Referee: Paul Matt Overton
- TV: FloSports
- Box score, Recap

Statistics	DEL	NCAT
First downs	32	21
Total yards	529	264
Rushing yards	201	74
Passing yards	328	190
Turnovers	1	3
Time of possession	32:18	27:42

Team	Category	Player	Statistics
Delaware	Passing	Ryan O'Connor	23/41, 325 yards, TD, INT
Delaware	Rushing	Ryan O'Connor	4 rushes, 47 yards, TD
Delaware	Receiving	Phil Lutz	3 receptions, 95 yards, TD
North Carolina A&T	Passing	Kevin White	14/25, 145 yards
North Carolina A&T	Rushing	Wesley Graves	14 rushes, 37 yards
North Carolina A&T	Receiving	Jayvonne Dillard	5 receptions, 71 yards

=== Penn ===
Penn Quakers at Delaware Fightin' Blue Hens – Game summary

Quarter	1	2	3	4	Total
Quakers	6	10	0	6	22
Fightin' Blue Hens	0	6	9	14	29

at Delaware Stadium, Newark, Delaware

- Date: September 21
- Game time: 6:00 p.m. EDT
- Game weather: 17,848
- Game attendance: 17,848
- Referee: Jeremy DeAngulo
- TV: FloSports
- Box score, Recap

Statistics	PENN	DEL
First downs	20	20
Total yards	393	375
Rushing yards	165	66
Passing yards	228	309
Turnovers	2	0
Time of possession	32:45	27:15

Team	Category	Player	Statistics
Penn	Passing	Aidan Sayin	17/28, 228 yards, 2 TD, 2 INT
Penn	Rushing	Malachi Hosley	26 rushes, 176 yards
Penn	Receiving	Jared Richardson	5 receptions, 98 yards, TD
Delaware	Passing	Ryan O'Connor	25/43, 309 yards, 3 TD
Delaware	Rushing	Jo'Nathan Silver	11 rushes, 56 yards, TD
Delaware	Receiving	Phil Lutz	7 receptions, 144 yards, 2 TD

=== Sacred Heart ===
Sacred Heart Pioneers at Delaware Fightin' Blue Hens – Game summary

Quarter	1	2	3	4	Total
Pioneers	0	0	0	0	0
Fightin' Blue Hens	14	21	14	0	49

at Delaware Stadium, Newark, Delaware

- Date: September 28
- Game time: 3:30 p.m. EDT
- Game weather: Cloudy
- Game attendance: 19,054
- Referee: Eric Lewis
- TV: FloSports
- Box score, Recap

Statistics	SHU	DEL
First downs	11	23
Total yards	129	414
Rushing yards	51	175
Passing yards	78	239
Turnovers	2	1
Time of possession	26:44	33:16

Team	Category	Player	Statistics
Sacred Heart	Passing	John Michalski	14/22, 78 yards, INT
Sacred Heart	Rushing	Jalen Madison	10 rushes, 30 yards
Sacred Heart	Receiving	Kevin McGuire	3 receptions, 24 yards
Delaware	Passing	Zach Marker	17/27, 183 yards, 3 TD
Delaware	Rushing	Jo'Nathan Silver	11 rushes, 53 yards
Delaware	Receiving	Phil Lutz	2 receptions, 62 yards, TD

=== at Monmouth ===
Delaware Fightin' Blue Hens at Monmouth Hawks – Game summary

Quarter	1	2	3	4	Total
Fightin' Blue Hens	3	11	14	14	42
Hawks	7	7	7	14	35

at Kessler Field, West Long Branch, New Jersey

- Date: October 5
- Game time: 1:00 p.m. EDT
- Game weather: Sunny, 74 °F (23 °C), Wind: SE @ 11 mph
- Game attendance: 3,374
- Referee: Anthony Florio
- TV announcers (FloSports): Eddy Occhipinti (play-by-play) and Emory Hunt (analyst)
- Box score, Recap

Game information

First quarter

- (11:50) DEL – Nate Reed 23-yard field goal (Drive: 7 plays, 57 yards, 1:47; Delaware 3-0)
- (06:20) MONM – Tra Neal 6-yard pass from Derek Robertson (Michael Calton Jr. kick) (Drive: 13 plays, 75 yards, 5:30; Monmouth 7-3)

Second quarter

- (12:45) DEL – Nate Reed 24-yard field goal (Drive: 7 plays, 55 yards, 2:20; Monmouth 7-6)
- (05:05) DEL – Marcus Yarns 1-yard run (Zach Marker pass to Marcus Yarns for two-point conversion) (Drive: 14 plays, 71 yards, 6:47; Delaware 14-7)
- (04:45) MONM – TJ Speight 87-yard pass from Derek Robertson (Michael Calton Jr. kick) (Drive: 1 play, 87 yards, 0:14; 14-14)

Third quarter

- (08:18) DEL – Zach Marker 5-yard run (Nate Reed kick) (Drive: 15 plays, 69 yards, 6:36; Delaware 21-14)
- (08:02) MONM – Gavin Nelson 72-yard pass from Derek Robertson (Michael Calton Jr. kick) (Drive: 1 play, 72 yards, 0:09; 21-21')
- (04:31) DEL – Phil Lutz 2-yard pass from Zach Marker (Nate Reed kick) (Drive: 9 plays, 63 yards, 3:27; Delaware 28-21)

Fourth quarter

- (13:57) MONM – Jack Neri 7-yard pass from Derek Robertson (Michael Calton Jr. PAT blocked) (Drive: 11 plays, 75 yards, 5:34; Delaware 28-27)
- (10:48) DEL – Phil Lutz 29-yard pass from Zach Marker (Nate Reed kick) (Drive: 7 plays, 81 yards, 3:01; Delaware 35-27)
- (06:10) DEL – Marcus Yarns 86-yard pass from Zach Marker (Nate Reed kick) (Drive: 2 plays, 92 yards, 0:55; Delaware 42-27)
- (03:20) MONM – Sone Ntoh 1-yard run (Derek Robertson pass to Gavin Nelson for two-point conversion) (Drive: 8 plays, 60 yards, 2:50; Delaware 42-35)

Statistics	DEL	MONM
First downs	26	18
Total yards	607	473
Rushing yards	309	112
Passing yards	298	361
Turnovers	0	1
Time of possession	34:28	25:32

Team	Category	Player	Statistics
Delaware	Passing	Zach Marker	16/33, 298 yards, 3 TD
Delaware	Rushing	Marcus Yarns	22 carries, 142 yards, TD
Delaware	Receiving	Phil Lutz	6 receptions, 91 yards, 2 TD
Monmouth	Passing	Derek Robertson	19/35, 361 yards, 4 TD, INT
Monmouth	Rushing	Rodney Nelson	14 carries, 76 yards
Monmouth	Receiving	T. J. Speight	6 receptions, 133 yards, TD

=== Maine ===
Maine Black Bears at Delaware Fightin' Blue Hens – Game summary

Quarter	1	2	3	4	Total
Black Bears	7	7	0	7	21
Fightin' Blue Hens	7	6	10	21	44

at Delaware Stadium, Newark, Delaware

- Date: October 12
- Game time: 1:00 p.m. EDT
- Game weather: Sunny
- Game attendance: 15,564
- Referee: Antonio Marcella
- TV: FloSports
- Box score, Recap

Statistics	ME	DEL
First downs	16	25
Total yards	229	458
Rushing yards	82	179
Passing yards	147	279
Turnovers	4	0
Time of possession	27:50	32:10

Team	Category	Player	Statistics
Maine	Passing	Carter Peevy	15/25, 147 yards, TD, 3 INT
Maine	Rushing	Brian Santana-Fis	6 rushes, 31 yards
Maine	Receiving	Montigo Moss	4 receptions, 51 yards, TD
Delaware	Passing	Zach Marker	20/31, 279 yards, 3 TD
Delaware	Rushing	Quincy Watson	12 rushes, 66 yards, TD
Delaware	Receiving	Phil Lutz	5 receptions, 133 yards, TD

=== at No. 18 Richmond ===
Delaware Fightin' Blue Hens at No. 18 Richmond Spiders – Game summary

Quarter	1	2	3	4	Total
Fightin' Blue Hens	3	6	0	0	9
No. 18 Spiders	7	21	0	0	28

at E. Claiborne Robins Stadium, Richmond, Virginia

- Date: October 19
- Game time: 3:30 p.m. EDT
- Game weather: Sunny
- Game attendance: 5,382
- Referee: Paul Matt Overton
- TV: FloSports/MASN
- Box score, Recap

Game information
First quarter
- DEL – Nate Reed 33-yard field goal, 10:53. Blue Hens 3–0. Drive: 8 plays, 32 yards, 3:01.
- RICH – Camden Coleman 1-yard run (Brandon Peskin kick), 7:36. Spiders 7–3. Drive: 7 plays, 75 yards, 3:17.

Second quarter

- RICH – Nick DeGennaro 23-yard pass from Camden Coleman (Brandon Peskin kick), 14:56. Spiders 14–3. Drive: 9 plays, 82 yards, 3:43.
- RICH – Zach Palmer-Smith 1-yard run (Brandon Peskin kick), 11:14. Spiders 21–3. Drive: 3 plays, 58 yards, 1:47.
- DEL – Phil Lutz 12-yard pass from Zach Marker (pass failed), 9:05. Spiders 21–9. Drive: 6 plays, 75 yards, 2:09.
- RICH – Matt Robbert 6-yard pass from Camden Coleman (Brandon Peskin kick), 3:07. Spiders 28–9. Drive: 11 plays, 75 yards, 5:58.

Third quarter

- No scoring plays

Fourth quarter

- No scoring plays

Statistics	DEL	RICH
First downs	19	20
Total yards	324	378
Rushing yards	36	184
Passing yards	288	194
Turnovers	2	0
Time of possession	24:46	35:14

Team	Category	Player	Statistics
Delaware	Passing	Zach Marker	21/43, 251 yards, TD
Delaware	Rushing	Marcus Yarns	7 rushes, 31 yards
Delaware	Receiving	Phil Lutz	6 receptions, 93 yards, TD
Richmond	Passing	Camden Coleman	16/23, 194 yards, 2 TD
Richmond	Rushing	Camden Coleman	10 rushes, 79 yards, TD
Richmond	Receiving	Nick DeGennaro	4 receptions, 81 yards, TD

=== Albany ===
Albany Great Danes at Delaware Fightin' Blue Hens – Game summary

Quarter	1	2	3	4	Total
Great Danes	7	0	7	0	14
Fightin' Blue Hens	14	7	0	7	28

at Delaware Stadium, Newark, Delaware

- Date: October 26
- Game time: 3:00 p.m. EDT
- Game weather: Sunny
- Game attendance: 17,847
- TV: FloSports
- Box score, Recap

Statistics	ALB	DEL
First downs	22	19
Total yards	342	353
Rushing yards	134	180
Passing yards	208	173
Turnovers	1	0
Time of possession	31:58	28:02

Team	Category	Player	Statistics
Albany	Passing	Myles Burkett	14/28, 208 yards, TD, INT
Albany	Rushing	Faysal Aden	10 rushes, 57 yards
Albany	Receiving	Seven McGee	3 receptions, 77 yards
Delaware	Passing	Nick Minicucci	18/27, 173 yards, 3 TD
Delaware	Rushing	Marcus Yarns	13 rushes, 127 yards, TD
Delaware	Receiving	JoJo Bermudez	6 receptions, 46 yards

=== No. 11 Rhode Island ===
No. 11 Rhode Island Rams at Delaware Fightin' Blue Hens – Game summary

Quarter	1	2	3	4	Total
No. 11 Rams	14	0	0	7	21
Fightin' Blue Hens	7	10	7	0	24

at Delaware Stadium, Newark, Delaware

- Date: November 9
- Game time: 1:00 p.m. EST
- Game weather: Sunny
- Game attendance: 17,326
- Referee: Todd Boyd
- TV announcers (FloSports): Matt Janus (play-by-play) and Thyrick Pitts (analyst)
- Box score, Recap

Game information
First quarter
- DEL – Nick Minicucci 1-yard run (Nate Reed kick), 6:43. Blue Hens 7–0. Drive: 7 plays, 92 yards, 3:22.
- URI – Marquis Buchanan 22-yard pass from Hunter Helms (Ty Groff kick), 1:45. Tied 7–7. Drive: 3 plays, 35 yards, 0:50.
- URI – Devin Hightower 21-yard fumble return (Ty Groff kick), 1:32. Rams 14–7.

Second quarter

- DEL – Marcus Yarns 27-yard run (Nate Reed kick), 13:36. Tied 14–14. Drive: 6 plays, 71 yards, 2:51.
- DEL – Nate Reed 25-yard field goal, 0:23. Blue Hens 17–14. Drive: 14 plays, 68 yards, 6:11.

Third quarter

- DEL – Jake Thaw 7-yard pass from Nick Minicucci (Nate Reed kick), 3:56. Blue Hens 24–14. Drive: 12 plays, 50 yards, 5:06.

Fourth quarter

- URI – Greg Gaines III 20-yard pass from Hunter Helms (Ty Groff kick), 6:23. Blue Hens 24–21. Drive: 9 plays, 74 yards, 2:51.

Statistics	URI	DEL
First downs	16	21
Total yards	300	390
Rushing yards	89	203
Passing yards	211	187
Turnovers	1	2
Time of possession	23:06	36:54

Team	Category	Player	Statistics
Rhode Island	Passing	Hunter Helms	15/23, 181 yards, 2 TD, INT
Rhode Island	Rushing	Malik Grant	12 rushes, 64 yards
Rhode Island	Receiving	Marquis Buchanan	5 receptions, 85 yards, TD
Delaware	Passing	Nick Minicucci	25/34, 187 yards, TD
Delaware	Rushing	Marcus Yarns	23 rushes, 174 yards, TD
Delaware	Receiving	Phil Lutz	5 receptions, 89 yards

=== Campbell ===
Campbell Fighting Camels at Delaware Fightin' Blue Hens – Game summary

Quarter	1	2	3	4	Total
Fighting Camels	6	10	6	0	22
Fightin' Blue Hens	12	15	0	14	41

at Delaware Stadium, Newark, Delaware

- Date: November 16
- Game time: 1:00 p.m. EST
- Game weather: Sunny
- Game attendance: 16,422
- Referee: Alex Parrella
- TV: FloSports
- Box score, Recap

Statistics	CAM	DEL
First downs	14	29
Total yards	327	529
Rushing yards	60	299
Passing yards	267	230
Turnovers	2	2
Time of possession	26:35	33:25

Team	Category	Player	Statistics
Campbell	Passing	Mike Chandler II	16/31, 267 yards, 2 TD, 2 INT
Campbell	Rushing	Mark Biggins	13 rushes, 44 yards, TD
Campbell	Receiving	V. J. Wilkins	5 receptions, 172 yards, 2 TD
Delaware	Passing	Nick Minicucci	16/26, 230 yards, 4 TD, INT
Delaware	Rushing	Marcus Yarns	17 rushes, 134 yards
Delaware	Receiving	Phil Lutz	4 receptions, 75 yards, 2 TD

=== at No. 15 Villanova (Battle of the Blue) ===
Delaware Fightin' Blue Hens at No. 15 Villanova Wildcats – Game summary

Quarter	1	2	3	4	Total
Fightin' Blue Hens	0	21	7	0	28
No. 15 Wildcats	14	7	7	10	38

at Villanova Stadium, Villanova, Pennsylvania

- Date: November 23
- Game time: 1:00 p.m. EST
- Game weather: Sunny, 50 °F (10 °C)
- Game attendance: 7,105
- Referee: Matt Overton
- TV: FloSports
- Box score, Recap

Game information
First quarter
- VILL – David Avit 1-yard run (Ethan Gettman kick), 4:39. Wildcats 7–0. Drive: 8 plays, 75 yards, 4:48.
- VILL – Brendan Bell 38-yard interception return (Ethan Gettman kick), 2:55. Wildcats 14–0.

Second quarter

- VILL – Kenyon Miles 36-yard pass from pass from Connor Watkins (Ethan Gettman kick), 9:49. Wildcats 21–0. Drive: 5 plays, 50 yards, 2:14.
- DEL – JoJo Bermudez 14-yard run (Nate Reed kick), 7:49. Wildcats 21–7. Drive: 4 plays, 43 yards, 2:00.
- DEL – Marcus Yarns 1-yard run (Nate Reed kick), 1:13. Wildcats 21–14. Drive: 10 plays, 69 yards, 4:58.
- DEL – Marcus Yarns 65-yard pass from Nick Minicucci (Nate Reed kick), 0:32. Tied 21–21. Drive: 2 plays, 68 yards, 0:18.

Third quarter

- VILL – Connor Watkins 38-yard run (Ethan Gettman kick), 12:36. Wildcats 28–21. Drive: 6 plays, 76 yards, 2:23.
- DEL – Jo'Nathan Silver 6-yard pass from Nick Minicucci (Nate Reed kick), 1:44. Tied 28–28. Drive: 10 plays, 80 yards, 5:04.

Fourth quarter

- VILL – Ethan Gettman 31-yard field goal, 8:41. Wildcats 31–28. Drive: 6 plays, 41 yards, 2:00.
- VILL – Brendan Bell 6-yard run (Ethan Gettman kick), 7:39. Wildcats 38–28. Drive: 2 plays, 18 yards, 0:52.

Statistics	DEL	VILL
First downs	22	18
Total yards	409	362
Rushing yards	196	159
Passing yards	213	203
Turnovers	4	1
Time of possession	32:19	27:41

Team	Category	Player	Statistics
Delaware	Passing	Nick Minicucci	18/33, 198 yards, 2 TD, 2 INT
Delaware	Rushing	Marcus Yarns	20 rushes, 100 yards, TD
Delaware	Receiving	Marcus Yarns	3 receptions, 74 yards, TD
Villanova	Passing	Connor Watkins	13/30, 203 yards, TD, INT
Villanova	Rushing	Connor Watkins	8 rushes, 79 yards, TD
Villanova	Receiving	Jaylan Sanchez	2 receptions, 46 yards
