= Daniel Kilgore (American football) =

American football player (born 1987)

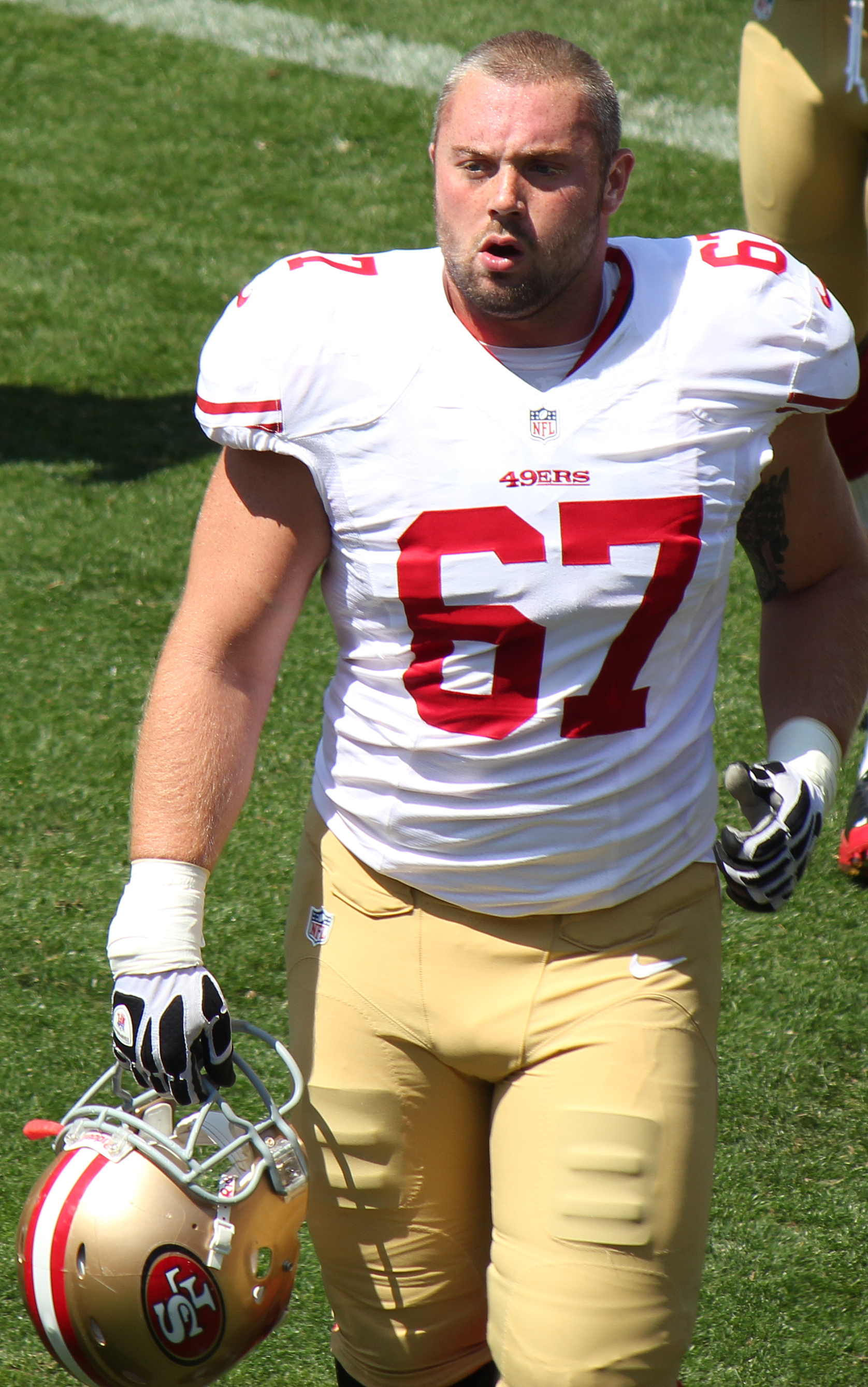
- Kilgore with the San Francisco 49ers in 2012

No. 67
- Position: Center

Personal information
- Born: December 18, 1987 (age 38); Kingsport, Tennessee, U.S.
- Listed height: 6 ft 3 in (1.91 m)
- Listed weight: 291 lb (132 kg)

Career information
- High school: Dobyns-Bennett (Kingsport)
- College: Appalachian State (2006–2010)
- NFL draft: 2011: 5th round, 163rd overall pick

Career history
- San Francisco 49ers (2011–2017); Miami Dolphins (2018–2019); Kansas City Chiefs (2020)

Awards and highlights
- 2× NCAA FCS national champion (2006, 2007)

Career NFL statistics
- Games played: 98
- Games started: 60
- Stats at Pro Football Reference

Daniel Ray Kilgore (born December 18, 1987) is an American former professional football player who was a center in the National Football League (NFL). He played college football for the Appalachian State Mountaineers and was selected by the San Francisco 49ers in the fifth round of the 2011 NFL draft. Kilgore also played for the Miami Dolphins and Kansas City Chiefs.

== Professional career ==
Pre-draft measurables
Height	Weight	Arm length	Hand span	Wingspan	40-yard dash	10-yard split	20-yard split	20-yard shuttle	Three-cone drill	Vertical jump	Broad jump	Bench press
6 ft 3 1/4 in (1.91 m)	308 lb (140 kg)	32 1/2 in (0.83 m)	10 in (0.25 m)	6 ft 5 3/4 in (1.97 m)	5.33 s	1.85 s	3.10 s	4.68 s	7.59 s	32.5 in (0.83 m)	8 ft 9 in (2.67 m)	23 reps
All values from NFL Combine

=== San Francisco 49ers ===
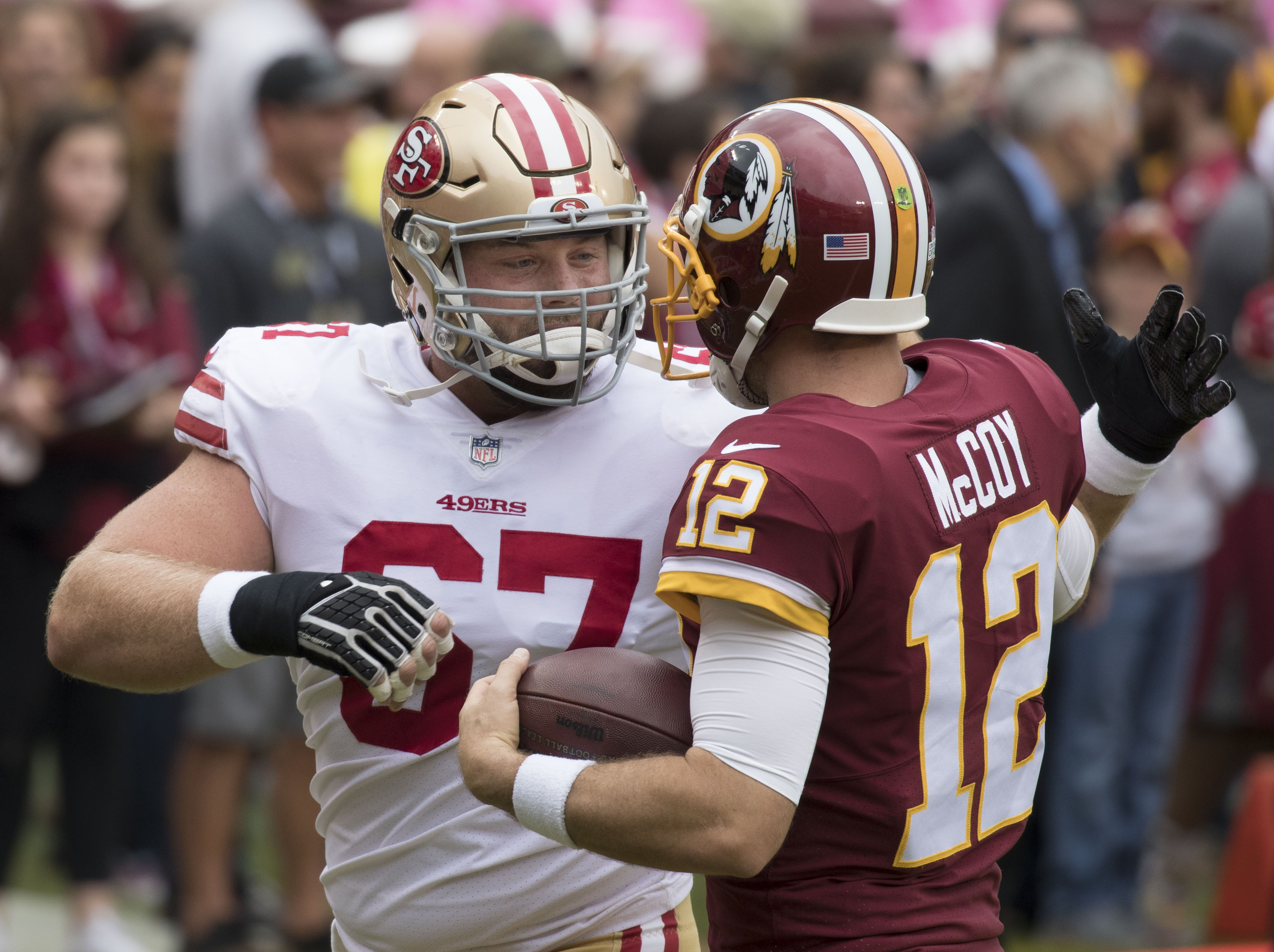
Kilgore embraces Colt McCoy in a game against the Washington Redskins in 2017

Kilgore was selected by the 49ers in the fifth round (163rd overall) of the 2011 NFL draft.

At the end of the 2012 season, Kilgore and the 49ers appeared in Super Bowl XLVII. In the game, he contributed on special teams, but the 49ers fell to the Baltimore Ravens by a score of 34–31.

On February 27, 2014, the 49ers signed Kilgore to a contract extension that kept him on the roster through 2017.

Kilgore was placed on injured reserve on December 13, 2016.

On February 14, 2018, the 49ers signed Kilgore to a three-year contract extension for $12 million with $7 million guaranteed, keeping him under contract through the 2020 season.

=== Miami Dolphins ===
On March 15, 2018, the 49ers traded Kilgore and their seventh-round pick in the 2018 NFL draft (#227 overall) to the Miami Dolphins for a seventh-round pick (#223 overall). The move was precipitated by the 49ers' signing of free agent center Weston Richburg the day before.

Kilgore started the first four games of the 2018 season at center before suffering a torn triceps in Week 4. He was placed on injured reserve on October 2.

On March 12, 2020, the Dolphins declined the option on Kilgore's contract, making him an unrestricted free agent.

=== Kansas City Chiefs ===
On August 27, 2020, Kilgore signed with the Kansas City Chiefs. He was placed on the reserve/COVID-19 list by the team on February 1, 2021. Kilgore was activated off the reserve/COVID-19 list five days later.

=== Retirement ===
Kilgore announced his retirement on July 25, 2021.

Offensive Coordinator

As of June 2026, Daniel Kilgore has been named as Offensive Coordinator for Dobyns-Bennett Football back at his high school, Dobyns-Bennett High School in Kingsport TN.^{[15]}
