= Scott Kahoe =

American lacrosse player

Scott Kahoe (born January 14, 1987) is a former USILA All-American and professional lacrosse player in the National Lacrosse League and Major League Lacrosse. Kahoe attended Radnor High School (Radnor, PA) and played his collegiate lacrosse at Georgetown University and Syracuse University.

== Early life and college ==
Kahoe attended Radnor High School in Radnor, Pennsylvania, where he was a high school All-American and ranked the No. 2 scholastic midfielder in the nation. Kahoe was also Pennsylvania All-State in Football and Basketball.

Kahoe enrolled at Georgetown University in the fall of 2004, being among the top recruiting class in Georgetown Lacrosse history. The All-American Midfielder helped Georgetown to three consecutive NCAA Quarterfinal appearances and two East Coast Athletic Conference Championships. In the fall of 2006, Kahoe had reconstructive shoulder surgery and was unable to compete in the 2007 season, granting him a medical redshirt, giving him an extra year of eligibility. After graduating from Georgetown University undergraduate, he elected to transfer and enroll in Graduate school at Syracuse University, where he would play his final year of eligibility. In 2009, Syracuse went on to defeat Cornell in the National Championship, finishing their season at 16–2.

== Professional career ==
In 2009, Kahoe initially elected not to declare for the Major League Lacrosse draft while waiting an appeal for an NCAA Hardship waiver, which would allow him an additional year to play football for the Syracuse University team, while completing his last year of a master's degree. However, in the fall of 2009, the NCAA Hardship waiver was denied due to NCAA time clock eligibility rules. Kahoe, then declared for the National Lacrosse League draft, where he was selected by the Boston Blazers with the 33rd overall pick. Soon after, the Boston Cannons of the Major League Lacrosse acquired Kahoe's rights for the 2010 season. Kahoe was also extended an open try-out with the NFL's Miami Dolphins and after being released, was signed by the Florida Tuskers, owned by Joe Theismann and led by head coach Jay Gruden of the United Football League for the 2010 season.

== Personal ==
Scott Kahoe is the son of Gardy Kahoe. Gardy Kahoe was the legendary Hall of Fame University of Delaware running back, whom after being named Associated Press First Team All-America and leading Delaware to their 1971 National Championship, went on the play for the Denver Broncos of the National Football League. Kahoe's sister, Alex, was three-time All-America and three-time NCAA Goalie of the year, while winning four National Championships at the University of Maryland.
