= George Schmitt =

American football player (born 1961)

No. 26
- Position: Defensive back

Personal information
- Born: March 6, 1961 (age 65); Bryn Mawr, Pennsylvania, U.S.
- Listed height: 5 ft 11 in (1.80 m)
- Listed weight: 193 lb (88 kg)

Career information
- College: Delaware
- NFL draft: 1983: 6th round, 157th overall pick

Career history
- St. Louis Cardinals (1983)

Awards and highlights
- First-team All-American (1982)

Career NFL statistics
- Fumble recoveries: 1
- Stats at Pro Football Reference

George Paul Schmitt (born March 6, 1961) is an American former professional football player who was a defensive back for one season in the National Football League (NFL). After playing college football for the Delaware Fightin' Blue Hens, he was selected by the St. Louis Cardinals in the sixth round of the 1983 NFL draft. He played in all 16 games for the Cardinals in 1983.

== College career ==
After attending Marple Newtown Senior High School in Newtown Square, Pennsylvania, Schmitt played college football at the University of Delaware for the Fightin' Blue Hens. Schmitt broke the school record for interceptions in a season (with 13 in 1982), career (22), and interception yards in a season (202) and career (296). Against Morgan State in 1980, he recorded three interceptions, tying him for the school record. He earned first-team All-American honors from the Associated Press and American Football Coaches Association, first-team All-Eastern College Athletic Conference, Outstanding Senior Athlete Award, and the Outstanding Senior Defensive Player Award during his senior season.

== Professional career ==
Schmitt was drafted by the St. Louis Cardinals in the sixth round (157th overall) of the 1983 NFL draft. In his rookie season, he recovered a fumble in the Cardinals' 44–14 win over the San Diego Chargers. He played in all 16 games for the Cardinals in 1983, his only professional season.

== Personal life ==
Schmitt has been employed by the CBRE Group since 1989.
