= Chase McGowan =

American football player (born 2000)

Profile
- Position: Defensive lineman

Personal information
- Born: December 12, 2000 (age 25)
- Listed height: 6 ft 1 in (1.85 m)
- Listed weight: 255 lb (116 kg)

Career information
- High school: North Stafford (Stafford, Virginia)
- College: Delaware

Career history
- Ottawa Redblacks (2024–2025)

Awards and highlights
- 2× All-CAA second-team (2020-21, 2023); 2× All-CAA third-team (2021, 2022)

Career CFL statistics as of 2025
- Total tackles: 2
- Stats at CFL.ca

Chase McGowan (born December 12, 2000) is an American professional football defensive lineman. McGowan played college football for the Delaware Fightin' Blue Hens.

== College career ==
McGowan played for the Delaware Fightin' Blue Hens from 2019 to 2023. He played in 52 games and recorded 110 tackles, including 40 tackles for loss, 22 sacks, four pass deflections, four forced fumbles and one fumble recoveries. He sits fourth in program history in sacks and fifth in tackles for loss. In his last four seasons at Delaware, McGowan earned All-CAA honors.

== Professional career ==
Pre-draft measurables
| Height | Weight | Arm length | Hand span | 40-yard dash | 10-yard split | 20-yard split | 20-yard shuttle | Three-cone drill | Vertical jump | Broad jump | Bench press |
|---|---|---|---|---|---|---|---|---|---|---|---|
| 6 ft 1 in (1.85 m) | 255 lb (116 kg) | 30 3/8 in (0.77 m) | 9 1/2 in (0.24 m) | 4.78 s | 1.63 s | 2.78 s | 4.49 s | 7.32 s | 31 in (0.79 m) | 9 ft 5 in (2.87 m) | 21 reps |
All values from Pro Day

=== Ottawa Redblacks ===
On September 13, 2024, McGowan signed with the Ottawa Redblacks. He was signed to the practice roster on May 31, 2025, as part of the final roster cuts. He was activated on July 11 and made his professional debut against the Hamilton Tiger-Cats.

On April 30, 2026, McGowan was released by the Redblacks.
