= Jared Richardson =

American football player

Duke Blue Devils
- Position: Wide receiver
- Class: Senior

Personal information
- Listed height: 6 ft 2 in (1.88 m)
- Listed weight: 220 lb (100 kg)

Career information
- High school: Bethlehem Catholic (Bethlehem, Pennsylvania)
- College: Penn (2022–2025); Duke (2026–present)

Awards and highlights
- 2× First-team All-Ivy League (2023, 2025); Second-team All-Ivy League (2024)
- Stats at ESPN

Jared Richardson is an American football wide receiver for the Duke Blue Devils. He previously played for the Penn Quakers.

== Early life ==
Richardson grew up in effort, Pennsylvania and attended Bethlehem Catholic High School, where he played basketball and football. He became the Golden Hawks' starting quarterback going into his sophomore season and completed 120 of 218 pass attempts for 1,543 yards with 11 touchdowns and nine interceptions. As a senior, Richardson passed for 1,317 yards with nine touchdowns and four interceptions and also rushed for 534 yards and six touchdowns. He committed to play college football at Penn.

== College career ==
Richardson played in four games during his freshman season as he transitioned from quarterback to wide receiver. He became a starter entering his sophomore season and was named first-team All-Ivy League after finishing the year with 67 receptions for 788 yards and eight touchdowns, all of which were second in the conference. Richardson caught 46 passes for 684 yards and seven touchdowns as a junior and was named second-team All-Ivy League. He was named first-team All-Ivy League a second time as a senior after catching 80 passes for 1,033 yards with 12 touchdown receptions. After the end of the season Richardson entered the NCAA transfer portal.

Richardson transferred to Duke for his final season of collegiate eligibility.
