= Gardy Kahoe =

American football player

- Kahoe at Delaware

Profile
- Position: Running back
- Class: Graduate student

Personal information
- Born: c. 1950
- Died: September 17, 2010
- Listed height: 6 ft 2 in (1.88 m)
- Listed weight: 210 lb (95 kg)

Career information
- High school: Germantown Academy
- College: Delaware (1968–1971)

Awards and highlights
- First-team Little All-American (1971)

Richard Gardner "Gardy" Kahoe III (c. 1950 – September 17, 2010) was an American football running back. He played for the Delaware Fightin' Blue Hens football team 1969 to 1971 and led the 1971 team to the small-college national championship with 1,328 rushing yards in 11 games. He was selected as a first-team running back on the 1971 Little All-America college football team.

== Early life ==
Kahoe grew up in Lafayette Hill, Pennsylvania, and attended the Germantown Academy. He played football, basketball, and baseball at Germantown.

== University of Delaware ==
Kahoe played college football at the University of Delaware from 1968 to 1971. In 1968, he played fullback for the Delaware freshman football team, known as the Blue Chicks.

As a junior in 1970, he and Chuck Hall became a powerful rushing tandem for Delaware. In the first four games, Kahoe tallied 469 rushing yards, including 112 yards against New Hampshire and 145 yards against Villanova. He missed two games with a leg injury.

As a sophomore, Kahoe played for the varsity team. After competing with Chuck Hall for the starting fullback position, Delaware coach Tubby Raymond moved Kahoe to halfback. He rushed for 53 yards on four carries in the 1969 Boardwalk Bowl. He also did some punting.

As a junior, he was Delaware's leading rusher until he sprained an ankle in early November, missing two games due to the injury. He finished the 1970 season with 818 rushing yards and nine touchdowns.

As a senior, Kahoe became the main offensive weapon for the 1971 Delaware Fightin' Blue Hens football team that was recognized by both the Associated Press and United Press International as the small college national champion. He rushed for 152 yards and two touchdowns against West Chester and a career-high 189 yards and four touchdowns against Lehigh. He tallied 1,216 yards and 23 touchdowns in 10 regular season games. His 1,216 yards and 23 touchdowns were both Delaware single-season records. He then added another 112 yards in the 1971 Boardwalk Bowl, bringing his 11-game season total to 1,328 yards. At the end of the season, he was selected as a first-team running back on the 1971 Little All-America college football team.

During Kahoe's three years on Delaware's varsity, the team compiled a 28-5 record and earned three Lambert Cup championships, three victories in the Boardwalk Bowl, and the 1971 small-college national championship. His career totals at Delaware were 2,376 rushing yards, 33 touchdowns, and an average of 6.6 yards per carry.

== Family and later years ==
Kahoe signed with the Denver Broncos in 1972. He then enrolled in the John Marshall Law School in Chicago after his football career.

In 2008, Kahoe was inducted into the Delaware Blue Hens Hall of Fame. Kahoe died suddenly in September 2010 at age 60.

Kahoe's son, Scott Kahoe, and daughter, Alex Kahoe were All-American and National Champion lacrosse players.
