= Jon Striefsky =

American football player (born 1986)

No. 1, 5
- Position: Kicker

Personal information
- Born: October 21, 1986 (age 40)
- Listed height: 6 ft 0 in (1.83 m)
- Listed weight: 205 lb (93 kg)

Career information
- High school: Towamencin Township (PA) North Penn
- College: Delaware
- NFL draft: 2010: undrafted

Career history
- Philadelphia Soul (2011); Jacksonville Sharks (2012); Lehigh Valley Steelhawks (2013); Philadelphia Soul (2014); Cleveland Gladiators (2016); Jacksonville Sharks (2016)

Awards and highlights
- Associated Press first-team All-America honors (2007); The Sports Network first-team All-America honors (2007); First-team All-Colonial Athletic Association honors (2007)

Career AFL statistics
- Field goals made – attempts: 2–4
- Extra points made – attempts: 78–94
- Tackles: 5
- Stats at ArenaFan.com

Jonathan Edmund Striefsky (born October 21, 1986) is an American former football kicker. After playing college football for the Delaware Fightin' Blue Hens, he was signed by the Philadelphia Soul of the Arena Football League as a free agent in 2011. He played for the Soul in 2011 and for the Jacksonville Sharks in 2012.

== Early life ==
Striefsky attended North Penn High School in Towamencin, Pennsylvania.

== College career ==
Striefsky was a walk-on for the University of Delaware Fightin' Blue Hens in 2005. As a sophomore in 2007, he broke or tied ten school kicking records. He broke the Football Championship Subdivision record for the most points scored in a season with 127 (tied with Julian Rauch of Appalachian State, who also set the record in 2007). He earned Associated Press and The Sports Network first-team All-America honors, and first-team All-Colonial Athletic Association honors in 2007. He won the Outstanding Senior Special Teams Player honor in 2009. In his career, he went 41-for-51 for field goals and 121-of-126 on extra point attempts.

== Professional career ==
=== Philadelphia Soul ===
Striefsky was signed by the Philadelphia Soul of the Arena Football League in May 2011, due to an injury suffered by kicker Robbie Smith. Striefsky went two-of-four for field goals and 39-of-47 on extra point attempts in 2011 for the Soul. He also recorded three tackles.

=== Jacksonville Sharks ===
Striefsky was assigned by the Jacksonville Sharks on June 15, 2012. In his only game appearance for the Sharks, he went 3-of-4 on extra point attempts. He was reassigned on June 18.

=== Return to Philadelphia ===
On June 20, 2014, Striefsky was assigned as an emergency kicker for the Soul.

=== Cleveland Gladiators ===
On May 6, 2016, Striefsky was assigned to the Cleveland Gladiators.

=== Jacksonville Sharks ===
On May 18, 2016, Striefsky was assigned to the Jacksonville Sharks. On May 23, 2016, Striefsky was placed on reassignment.
