= Nick Minicucci =

American football player

No. 4 – Delaware Fightin' Blue Hens
- Position: Quarterback
- Class: Senior

Personal information
- Listed height: 6 ft 2 in (1.88 m)
- Listed weight: 215 lb (98 kg)

Career information
- High school: Don Bosco Prep (Ramsey, New Jersey)
- College: Delaware (2023–present)

Awards and highlights
- Second-team All-CUSA (2025)
- Stats at ESPN

Nicholas Minicucci IV is an American college football quarterback for the Delaware Fightin' Blue Hens.

== Early life ==
Raised in Midland Park, New Jersey, Minicucci attended Don Bosco Preparatory High School in Ramsey, New Jersey. As a senior, he threw for 2,022 yards and 19 touchdowns and rushed for 651 yards and 8 touchdowns. He committed to play college football at the University of Delaware.

== College career ==
Minicucci primarily served as a reserve quarterback as a true freshman. Following injuries to Ryan O’Connor and Zach Marker, he was named the Fightin' Blue Hens' starting quarterback against Lafayette in the first round of the FCS playoffs. In his first career start, Minicucci threw for 198 yards, three touchdowns, and three interceptions, leading Delaware to a 36–34 victory. During the following season in a match against Campbell, he threw for 230 yards and accounted for six total touchdowns in a 41–22 win. Minicucci finished his sophomore campaign throwing for 825 yards and ten touchdowns.

Following the early injury of starting quarterback Zach Marker in the Blue Hens' 2025 season opener against Delaware State, then-backup Minicucci completed 28 passes for 270 yards and 3 touchdowns and rushed for 1 touchdown. He was named the Fightin' Blue Hens starting quarterback after that game, a role he retained for the rest of the 2025 season. Minicucci completed the 2025 season with 3,683 passing yards, the 6th most passing yards of any college football quarterback during that season and the most passing yards of any CUSA quarterback during that season.

=== Statistics ===
Season	Team	Games			Passing								Rushing			
Season	Team	GP	GS	Record	Comp	Att	Pct	Yards	Avg	TD	Int	Rate	Att	Yards	Avg	TD
2023	Delaware	6	1	1–0	49	81	60.5	474	5.9	5	5	117.7	33	156	4.7	0
2024	Delaware	9	5	4–1	79	124	63.7	825	6.7	10	3	141.4	45	109	2.4	3
2025	Delaware	13	12	6–6	322	512	62.9	3,683	7.2	23	7	135.4	112	235	2.1	10
2026	Delaware	6	6	4–2	111	170	65.3	1,477	8.7	14	4	160.8	26	44	1.7	2
Career		34	24	15–9	560	887	63.1	6,447	7.3	52	20	139.3	216	576	2.7	15
