= Omar Cuff =

American football player (born 1984)

No. 28
- Position: Running back

Personal information
- Born: September 24, 1984 (age 42); Landover, Maryland, U.S.
- Listed height: 5 ft 10 in (1.78 m)
- Listed weight: 196 lb (89 kg)

Career information
- High school: Charles Herbert Flowers (Springdale, Maryland)
- College: Delaware (2004-2007)
- NFL draft: 2008: undrafted

Career history
- Tennessee Titans (2008)*; Cleveland Browns (2008)*; Kansas City Chiefs (2008)*; Tampa Bay Buccaneers (2008)*; New England Patriots (2009)*
- * Offseason or practice squad member only

Awards and highlights
- 2× All-Atlantic 10 (2005–2006); First-team All-CAA (2007)

Anthony Omar Cuff (born September 24, 1984) is an American former professional football running back. He was signed by the Tennessee Titans as an undrafted free agent in 2008. He played college football at Delaware.

Cuff was on the practice squads of the Cleveland Browns, Kansas City Chiefs, Tampa Bay Buccaneers, and New England Patriots.
