= Marcus Yarns =

American football player (born 2001)

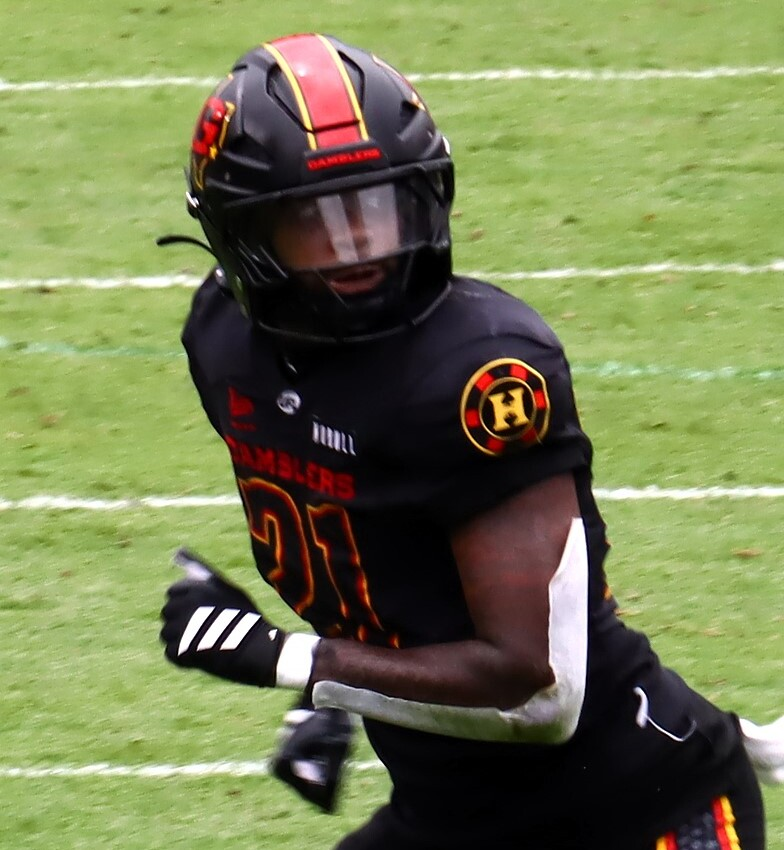

No. 21 – Dallas Renegades
- Position: Running back
- Roster status: Active

Personal information
- Born: October 30, 2001 (age 25); Salisbury, Maryland, U.S.
- Listed height: 5 ft 11 in (1.80 m)
- Listed weight: 198 lb (90 kg)

Career information
- High school: Parkside (Salisbury, Maryland)
- College: Delaware (2020–2024)
- NFL draft: 2025: undrafted

Career history
- New Orleans Saints (2025)*; Houston Gamblers (2026); Dallas Renegades (2027–present)
- * Offseason or practice squad member only
- Stats at Pro Football Reference

Marcus Yarns (born October 30, 2001) is an American professional football running back for the Dallas Renegades of the United Football League (UFL). He played college football for the Delaware Fightin' Blue Hens.

== Early life ==
Yarns is from Salisbury, Maryland. He attended Parkside High School in Salisbury where he played football, basketball and lacrosse, being a two-year captain in both football and basketball. In football, he played as a running back and safety and was a two-time all-conference performer. He ran for over 1,500 yards and 12 touchdowns as a junior but then suffered a knee injury that caused him to miss much of his senior season. Although he had offers to play college football for NCAA Division I FBS-level teams, he committed to the FCS-level Delaware Fightin' Blue Hens.

== College career ==
As a freshman at Delaware in the spring 2021 season, Yarns played in one game. However, he missed most of the season due to a broken leg. He saw limited playing time as a sophomore in the fall 2021 season, totaling 23 rushes for 80 yards in eight games. The following year, he ran 73 times for 481 yards and two touchdowns, averaging 6.6 yards-per-carry which placed first on the team. In 2023, he posted a team-leading 939 rushing yards and 15 touchdowns, recording an average of 6.9 yards-per-carry which placed fourth in the FCS. He was a third-team FCS All-American selection and a second-team All-Coastal Athletic Association (CAA) pick that year. Yarns returned for a final season in 2024. He appeared in nine games and ran 133 times for 844 yards and six touchdowns, also catching 17 passes for 297 yards and five touchdowns while being selected first-team All-CAA. He concluded his collegiate career with over 3,000 total yards.

=== College statistics ===
Season	Team	GP	Rushing					Receiving				
Season	Team	GP	Att	Yds	Avg	Lng	TD	Rec	Yds	Avg	Lng	TD
2020	Delaware	1	–	–	–	–	–	–	–	–	–	–
2021	Delaware	8	23	80	3.5	14	0	2	5	2.5	5	0
2022	Delaware	13	73	481	6.6	82	2	21	199	9.5	72	3
2023	Delaware	13	136	939	6.9	66	15	24	311	13.0	75	3
2024	Delaware	9	133	844	6.3	69	6	17	297	17.5	86	5
Career		44	365	2,344	6.4	82	23	64	812	12.7	86	11

== Professional career ==
Pre-draft measurables
Height	Weight	Arm length	Hand span	Wingspan	40-yard dash	10-yard split	20-yard split	20-yard shuttle	Three-cone drill	Vertical jump	Broad jump	Bench press
5 ft 10 7/8 in (1.80 m)	193 lb (88 kg)	31 1/8 in (0.79 m)	9 1/8 in (0.23 m)	6 ft 4 3/8 in (1.94 m)	4.45 s	1.55 s	2.58 s	4.43 s	7.33 s	37.5 in (0.95 m)	10 ft 2 in (3.10 m)	9 reps
All values from NFL Combine/Pro Day

=== New Orleans Saints ===
Yarns was invited to the 2025 East–West Shrine Bowl, the 2025 Senior Bowl, and to the 2025 NFL Scouting Combine. On April 27, Yarns went undrafted in the 2025 NFL Draft and signed with the New Orleans Saints as an undrafted free agent. He was waived on August 26 as part of final roster cuts.

=== Houston Gamblers ===
On January 13, 2026, Yarns was selected by the Houston Gamblers in the 2026 UFL Draft.

== Career statistics ==
=== UFL ===
==== Regular season ====
Year	Team	Games		Rushing					Receiving				
Year	Team	GP	GS	Att	Yds	Avg	Lng	TD	Rec	Yds	Avg	Lng	TD
2026	HOU	9	3	61	346	5.7	68	1	10	76	7.6	17	0
Career		9	3	61	346	5.7	68	1	10	76	7.6	17	0
