= 2003 Delaware Fightin' Blue Hens football team =

American college football season

2003 Delaware Fightin' Blue Hens football

NCAA Division I-AA champion A-10 co-champion Lambert Cup winner ECAC Team of the Year

NCAA Division I-AA Championship Game, W 40–0 vs. Colgate
- Conference: Atlantic 10 Conference

Ranking
- Sports Network: No. 1
- Record: 15–1 (8–1 A-10)
- Head coach: K. C. Keeler (2nd season)
- Offensive coordinator: Kirk Ciarrocca (2nd season)
- Offensive scheme: Spread
- Defensive coordinator: Dave Cohen (2nd season)
- Base defense: 4–3
- Home stadium: Delaware Stadium

2003 Atlantic 10 Conference football standings
	Conf.			Overall
Team	W		L	W		L
No. 1 Delaware +^	8	–	1	15	–	1
No. 11 UMass +^	8	–	1	10	–	3
No. 20 Northeastern	6	–	3	8	–	4
No. 25 Villanova	5	–	4	7	–	4
Maine	4	–	4	6	–	5
William & Mary	4	–	4	5	–	5
James Madison	4	–	5	6	–	6
New Hampshire	3	–	6	5	–	7
Rhode Island	3	–	6	4	–	8
Hofstra	2	–	6	2	–	10
Richmond	1	–	8	2	–	9
+ – Conference co-champions; ^ – NCAA Division I-AA playoff participant; Rankings from The Sports Network poll

The 2003 Delaware Fightin' Blue Hens football team was an American football team that represented the University of Delaware as a member of the Atlantic 10 Conference (A-10) during the 2003 NCAA Division I-AA football season. In their second year under head coach K. C. Keeler, the Fightin' Blue Hens compiled a 15–1 record (8–1 in conference games, outscored opponents by a total of 555 to 247, and tied with UMass for the A-10 championship. The Fightin' Blue Hens advanced to the NCAA Division I-AA playoffs, where they defeated Southern Illinois in the first round, Northern Iowa in the quarterfinals, Wofford in the semifinals, and Colgate in the championship game.

The team gained 3,322 rushing yards (207.6 yards per game) and 2,937 passing yards (183.6 yards per game). On defense, they gave up 1,829 rushing yards (114.3 yards per game) and 3,019 passing yards (188.7 yards per game). The team's individual statistical leaders included:

- Quarterback Andy Hall completed 234 of 378 passes (61.9%) for 2,764 yards with 25 touchdowns and seven interceptions. He tallied a season-high 283 passing yards against The Citadel.
- Running back Germaine Bennett set a Delaware record with 1,625 rushing yards on 323 carries (5.0 yards per carry) with 21 touchdowns. Bennett also led the team with 126 points scored. He rushed for a season-high 186 yards against Wofford.
- Wide receiver David Boler tallied 60 receptions for 716 yards and nine touchdowns. He had a season-high 121 receiving yards against New Hampshire.
- Middle linebacker Mondoe Davis led the team with 110 total tackles, including 54 solo tackles and 56 assists.
- Placekicker Brad Shushman completed 17 of 24 field goals and 64 of 67 extra points for a total of 115 points.

The team played home games at Delaware Stadium in Newark, Delaware.

== Schedule ==
Date	Time	Opponent	Rank	Site	TV	Result	Attendance	Source
September 6	7:00 pm	The Citadel*	No. 14	Delaware Stadium; Newark, DE		W 41–7	20,612	
September 13	7:00 pm	Richmond	No. 11	Delaware Stadium; Newark, DE	CN8	W 44–14	21,388	
September 20	7:00 pm	West Chester*	No. 8	Delaware Stadium; Newark, DE (rivalry)		W 49–7	21,002	
September 27	12:30 pm	at Hofstra	No. 7	James M. Shuart Stadium; Hempstead, NY	CSTV	W 24–14	3,228	
October 4	7:00 pm	William & Mary	No. 4	Delaware Stadium; Newark, DE (rivalry)		W 41–27	20,485	
October 11	12:00 pm	at New Hampshire	No. 4	Cowell Stadium; Durham, NH	CSN	W 22–21	4,815	
October 18	12:00 pm	Rhode Island^{†}	No. 4	Delaware Stadium; Newark, DE		W 55–10	20,795	
October 25	1:30 pm	at Navy*	No. 3	Navy–Marine Corps Memorial Stadium; Annapolis, MD	HDNet	W 21–17	34,982	
November 1	1:00 pm	Maine	No. 2	Delaware Stadium; Newark, DE		W 24–21 ^{OT}	22,057	
November 8	12:30 pm	at Northeastern	No. 2	Parsons Field; Brookline, MA		L 14–24	4,198	
November 15	12:20 pm	No. 3 UMass	No. 6	Delaware Stadium; Newark, DE	TFN	W 51–45 ^{3OT}	21,804	
November 22	4:00 pm	at No. 18 Villanova	No. 3	Villanova Stadium; Villanova, PA (Battle of the Blue)	CN8	W 20–17	12,253	
November 29	1:00 pm	No. 4 Southern Illinois*	No. 3	Delaware Stadium; Newark, DE (NCAA Division I-AA First Round)	CSTV	W 48–7	14,572	
December 6	12:00 pm	No. 7 Northern Iowa*	No. 3	Delaware Stadium; Newark, DE (NCAA Division I-AA Quarterfinal)	ESPN Plus	W 37–7	11,881	
December 13	1:00 pm	No. 2 Wofford*	No. 3	Delaware Stadium; Newark, DE (NCAA Division I-AA Semifinal)	ESPN2	W 24–9	14,351	
December 19	7:00 pm	vs. No. 6 Colgate*	No. 3	Finley Stadium; Chattanooga, TN (NCAA Division I-AA Championship Game)	ESPN2	W 40–0	14,281	
*Non-conference game; ^{†}Homecoming; Rankings from The Sports Network Poll released prior to the game; All times are in Eastern time

== Roster ==
2003 Delaware Fightin' Blue Hens football team roster
Players
Coaches
Offense

Pos.	#	Name	Class
RB	2	Germaine Bennett	Sr
WR	6	David Boler	So
QB	10	Ryan Carty	Fr
QB	12	Andy Hall	Sr
WR	18	Joe Bleymaier	So

Defense

Pos.	#	Name	Class
DB	24	Mike Adams	Sr
DB	4	Roger Brown	So
LB	15	Mondoe Davis	Jr
DB	47	Sidney Haugabrook	Jr
C	69	Chris Edwards	Jr
TE	88	Rick Lavelle	Sr
DL	96	Shawn Johnson	Sr
DL	90	Richard Washington	Fr

Special teams

Pos.	#	Name	Class

Head coach

- K. C. Keeler

Coordinators/assistant coaches

- Bryan Bossard
- Kirk Ciarrocca
- Dave Cohen
- Kyle Flood
- Brian Ginn

Legend

- (C) Team captain
- (S) Suspended
- (I) Ineligible
- Injured
- Redshirt

Roster
