= 2003 NCAA Division I-AA Football Championship Game =

College football game

2003 NCAA Division I-AA Football Championship
- I-AA National Championship Game
Colgate Raiders	Delaware Fightin' Blue Hens
(15–0)	(14–1)
Patriot League	Atlantic 10
0	40
Head coach: Dick Biddle	Head coach: K. C. Keeler
TSN / Seed; 6 / 4	TSN / Seed; 3 / 2
	1	2	3	4	Total
Colgate	0	0	0	0	0
Delaware	13	7	14	6	40
- Date: December 19, 2003
- Season: 2003
- Stadium: Finley Stadium
- Location: Chattanooga, Tennessee
- Referee: Mike Purcell (Ohio Valley)
- Attendance: 14,281

United States TV coverage
- Network: ESPN2
- Announcers: Sean McDonough (play-by-play), Mike Golic (color), Rod Gilmore (color), Rob Stone (sideline)

The 2003 NCAA Division I-AA Football Championship Game was a postseason college football game between the Delaware Fightin' Blue Hens and the Colgate Raiders. The game was played on December 19, 2003, at Finley Stadium, home field of the University of Tennessee at Chattanooga. The culminating game of the 2003 NCAA Division I-AA football season, it was won by Delaware, 40–0.

== Teams ==
The participants of the Championship Game were the finalists of the 2003 I-AA Playoffs, which began with a 16-team bracket.

=== Delaware Fightin' Blue Hens ===
Delaware finished their regular season with an 11–1 record (8–1 in conference). Their only loss was to Northeastern, while one of their wins was over Navy of Division I-A. The Fightin' Blue Hens, seeded second in the tournament, defeated Southern Illinois, Northern Iowa, and third-seed Wofford to reach the final. This was the second appearance for Delaware in a Division I-AA championship game, having lost in 1982.

=== Colgate Raiders ===
Colgate finished their regular season with a 12–0 record (7–0 in conference). The Raiders, seeded fourth in the tournament, defeated UMass, Western Illinois, and Florida Atlantic to reach the final. This was the first appearance for Colgate in a Division I-AA championship game.

== Game summary ==
=== Scoring summary ===
Scoring summary

Quarter	Time	Drive			Team	Scoring information	Score	
Quarter	Time	Plays	Yards	TOP	Team	Scoring information	COLG	DEL
1	7:29	8	60	2:37	DEL	Antawn Jenkins 3-yard touchdown run, Brad Shushman kick good	0	7
1	2:35	5	34	2:14	DEL	Germaine Bennett 1-yard touchdown run, Shushman kick no good (hit left upright)	0	13
2	14:55	5	18	1:56	DEL	David Boler 5-yard touchdown reception from Andy Hall, Shushman kick good	0	20
3	7:30	5	28	2:35	DEL	Boler 9-yard touchdown reception from Hall, Shushman kick good	0	27
3	2:52	8	62	3:37	DEL	Bennett 1-yard touchdown run, Shushman kick good	0	34
4	12:22	7	58	3:40	DEL	Jenkins 2-yard touchdown run, Shushman kick no good (wide left)	0	40
"TOP" = time of possession. For other American football terms, see Glossary of American football.							0	40

=== Game statistics ===
	1	2	3	4	Total
No. 4 Raiders	0	0	0	0	0
No. 2 Fighting' Blue Hens	13	7	14	6	40

Statistics	COLG	DEL
First downs	10	20
Plays–yards	54–157	75–348
Rushes–yards	32–46	55–165
Passing yards	111	183
Passing: comp–att–int	10–22–0	12–20–0
Time of possession	23:23	34:40

Team	Category	Player	Statistics
Colgate	Passing	Chris Brown	9–21, 94 yds
Colgate	Rushing	Jamal Branch	20–55
Colgate	Receiving	Luke Graham	4 rec, 32 yds
Delaware	Passing	Andy Hall	12–20, 183 yds, 2 TD
Delaware	Rushing	Germaine Bennett	20–60, 2 TD
Delaware	Receiving	David Boler	6 rec, 91 yds, 2 TD
