= Ryan Carty =

American football player and coach (born 1983)

Current position
- Title: Head coach
- Team: Delaware
- Conference: CUSA
- Record: 39–22

Biographical details
- Born: August 9, 1983 (age 43)

Playing career
- 2002–2006: Delaware
- Position: Quarterback

Coaching career (HC unless noted)
- 2007: New Hampshire (TE)
- 2008–2009: New Hampshire (RB)
- 2010–2011: New Hampshire (WR)
- 2012–2017: New Hampshire (OC/QB)
- 2018–2021: Sam Houston State (OC/QB)
- 2022–present: Delaware

Head coaching record
- Overall: 39–22
- Bowls: 1–0
- Tournaments: 2–2

Ryan Carty (born August 9, 1983) is an American college football coach. He is the head football coach at the University of Delaware, a position he had held since the 2022 season.

== Playing career ==
Raised in Somerville, New Jersey, Carty played high school football at Somerville High School.

Carty played as a quarterback at Delaware from 2002 to 2006. He was a backup quarterback for the entirety of his career, including when Delaware won the NCAA Division I-AA national championship in 2003. He was named a team captain in his senior season and was projected to be the Blue Hens' starting quarterback, but lost the position to transfer and future Super Bowl MVP Joe Flacco.

== Coaching career ==
=== New Hampshire ===
Carty began his coaching career at New Hampshire as the program's tight ends coach, one of the final hires made by offensive coordinator Chip Kelly before he departed for Oregon. He also spent two years each coaching running backs and wide receivers at New Hampshire before he was promoted to offensive coordinator in 2012.

=== Sam Houston State ===
Carty was hired as the offensive coordinator at Sam Houston State in 2018, reuniting him with his college coach K. C. Keeler. He was named FootballScoop's FCS coordinator of the year in 2020, after Sam Houston State won its first NCAA Division I FCS national championship.

=== Delaware ===
Carty was named head football coach of the University of Delaware on December 10, 2021.

== Personal life ==
Carty's father, Kevin Sr., was a coach at the high school and college levels, and Carty's brothers. Kevin Jr. and Sean, were also high school football coaches.

== Head coaching record ==
Year	Team	Overall	Conference	Standing	Bowl/playoffs	STATS^{#}	Coaches^{°}
Delaware Fightin' Blue Hens (Colonial Athletic Association) (2022)
2022	Delaware	8–5	4–4	6th	L NCAA Division I Second Round	19	24 (tie)
Delaware Fightin' Blue Hens (Coastal Athletic Association Football Conference) (2023–24)
2023	Delaware	9–4	6–2	T–4th	L NCAA Division I Second Round	10	11
2024	Delaware	9–2	6–2	T–3rd	Ineligible for rankings/postseason		
Delaware Fightin' Blue Hens (Conference USA) (2025–present)
2025	Delaware	7–6	4–4	7th	W 68 Ventures		
2026	Delaware	6–5	4–3				
Delaware:		39–22	24–15				
Total:		39–22					
