= 2003 Richmond Spiders football team =

American college football season

2003 Richmond Spiders football
- Conference: Atlantic 10 Conference
- Record: 2–9 (1–8 A-10)
- Head coach: Jim Reid (9th season)
- Offensive coordinator: Tony DeMeo (2nd season)
- Home stadium: University of Richmond Stadium

2003 Atlantic 10 Conference football standings
	Conf.			Overall
Team	W		L	W		L
No. 1 Delaware +^	8	–	1	15	–	1
No. 11 UMass +^	8	–	1	10	–	3
No. 20 Northeastern	6	–	3	8	–	4
No. 25 Villanova	5	–	4	7	–	4
Maine	4	–	4	6	–	5
William & Mary	4	–	4	5	–	5
James Madison	4	–	5	6	–	6
New Hampshire	3	–	6	5	–	7
Rhode Island	3	–	6	4	–	8
Hofstra	2	–	6	2	–	10
Richmond	1	–	8	2	–	9
+ – Conference co-champions; ^ – NCAA Division I-AA playoff participant; Rankings from The Sports Network poll

The 2003 Richmond Spiders football team represented the University of Richmond during the 2003 NCAA Division I-AA football season. Richmond competed as a member of the Atlantic 10 Conference (A-10), and played their home games at the University of Richmond Stadium.

The Spiders were led by ninth-year head coach Jim Reid and finished the regular season with a 2–9 overall record and 1–8 record in conference play.

== Schedule ==
Date	Time	Opponent	Site	TV	Result	Attendance	Source
September 13	7:00 p.m.	at No. 9 Delaware	Delaware Stadium; Newark, DE	CN8	L 14–44	21,388	
September 20	7:00 p.m.	at No. 9 Furman*	Paladin Stadium; Greenville, SC		L 17–31	12,452	
September 27	3:30 p.m.	Rhode Island	University of Richmond Stadium; Richmond, VA	TFN	L 13–17	8,270	
October 4	2:00 p.m.	at No. 23 Maine	Alfond Stadium; Orono, ME		L 10–20	6,839	
October 11	3:00 p.m.	at James Madison	Bridgeforth Stadium; Harrisonburg, VA (rivalry)		L 14–34	12,470	
October 18	1:00 p.m.	New Hampshire	University of Richmond Stadium; Richmond, VA		W 35–23	5,287	
October 25	3:00 p.m.	VMI*^{†}	University of Richmond Stadium; Richmond, VA		W 35–25	9,122	
November 1	1:00 p.m.	No. 7 Villanova	University of Richmond Stadium; Richmond, VA		L 13–42	5,152	
November 8	12:00 p.m.	at No. 4 UMass	Warren McGuirk Alumni Stadium; Hadley, MA		L 17–30	6,167	
November 15	12:30 p.m.	at No. 23 Northeastern	Parsons Field; Boston, MA		L 0–45	3,535	
November 22	1:00 p.m.	William & Mary	University of Richmond Stadium; Richmond, VA (I-64 Bowl)		L 21–59	6,228	
*Non-conference game; ^{†}Homecoming; Rankings from The Sports Network Poll released prior to the game; All times are in Eastern time
