= 2003 William & Mary Tribe football team =

American college football season

2003 William & Mary Tribe football
- Conference: Atlantic 10 Conference
- Record: 5–5 (4–4 A-10)
- Head coach: Jimmye Laycock (24th season)
- Offensive coordinator: Zbig Kepa (11th season)
- Defensive coordinator: Tom Clark (3rd season)
- Captains: Marques Bobo; Rich Musinski
- Home stadium: Zable Stadium

2003 Atlantic 10 Conference football standings
	Conf.			Overall
Team	W		L	W		L
No. 1 Delaware +^	8	–	1	15	–	1
No. 11 UMass +^	8	–	1	10	–	3
No. 20 Northeastern	6	–	3	8	–	4
No. 25 Villanova	5	–	4	7	–	4
Maine	4	–	4	6	–	5
William & Mary	4	–	4	5	–	5
James Madison	4	–	5	6	–	6
New Hampshire	3	–	6	5	–	7
Rhode Island	3	–	6	4	–	8
Hofstra	2	–	6	2	–	10
Richmond	1	–	8	2	–	9
+ – Conference co-champions; ^ – NCAA Division I-AA playoff participant; Rankings from The Sports Network poll

The 2003 William & Mary Tribe football team represented the College of William & Mary as member of the Atlantic 10 Conference (A-10) during the 2003 NCAA Division I-AA football season. Led by Jimmye Laycock in his 24th year as head coach, William & Mary finished the season with an overall record of 5–5 and a mark of 4–4 in A-10 play, tying for fifth place.

William & Mary only played 10 games due to a cancellation of a game against Maine, which had been scheduled for September 27. The presidents of the A-10 awarded Maine a victory and William & Mary a no-contest as a result of the cancellation of their game. The decision of the presidents, based upon the recommendation of the league's directors of athletics, was unprecedented in A-10 history. Factored into the decision were Maine's efforts to play the game and the understanding of the unique circumstances facing William & Mary in the aftermath of Hurricane Isabel. However, the NCAA does not recognize the win in their official records.

== Schedule ==
Date	Time	Opponent	Site	Result	Attendance	Source
September 6	7:00 pm	at Western Michigan*	Waldo Stadium; Kalamazoo, MI	L 24–56	25,316	
September 13	1:00 pm	at VMI*	Alumni Memorial Field; Lexington, VA (rivalry)	W 34–24	7,125	
September 20	12:30 pm	at No. 4 Northeastern	Parsons Field; Brookline, MA	L 14–48	4,921	
October 4	7:00 pm	at No. 4 Delaware	Delaware Stadium; Newark, DE (rivalry)	L 27–41	20,485	
October 11	1:00 pm	No. 7 UMass	Zable Stadium; Williamsburg, VA	L 14–24	4,868	
October 18	1:00 pm	James Madison^{†}	Zable Stadium; Williamsburg, VA (rivalry)	L 17–24	8,038	
October 25	12:00 pm	at Rhode Island	Meade Stadium; Kingston, RI	W 37–24	4,098	
November 1	12:00 pm	Hofstra^{†}	Zable Stadium; Williamsburg, VA	W 23–9	9,051	
November 15	1:00 pm	New Hampshire	Zable Stadium; Williamsburg, VA	W 38–28	4,887	
November 21	1:00 pm	at Richmond	University of Richmond Stadium; Richmond, VA (I-64 Bowl)	W 59–21	6,228	
*Non-conference game; ^{†}Homecoming; Rankings from The Sports Network Poll released prior to the game; All times are in Eastern time
