= 2003 Western Carolina Catamounts football team =

American college football season

2003 Western Carolina Catamounts football
- Conference: Southern Conference
- Record: 5–7 (3–5 SoCon)
- Head coach: Kent Briggs (2nd season)
- Defensive coordinator: Geoff Collins (2nd season)
- Home stadium: Bob Waters Field at E. J. Whitmire Stadium

2003 Southern Conference football standings
	Conf.			Overall
Team	W		L	W		L
No. 3 Wofford $^	8	–	0	12	–	2
Appalachian State	6	–	2	7	–	4
No. 24 Georgia Southern	5	–	3	7	–	4
Furman	4	–	4	6	–	5
The Citadel	4	–	4	6	–	6
Western Carolina	3	–	5	5	–	7
Chattanooga	3	–	5	3	–	9
East Tennessee State	2	–	6	5	–	7
Elon	1	–	7	2	–	10
$ – Conference champion; ^ – NCAA Division I-AA playoff participant; Rankings from The Sports Network I-AA Poll

The 2003 Western Carolina Catamounts team represented Western Carolina University as a member of the Southern Conference (SoCon) during the 2003 NCAA Division I-AA football season. The Catamounts were led by second-year head coach Kent Briggs and played their home games at Bob Waters Field at E. J. Whitmire Stadium in Cullowhee, North Carolina. Western Carolina compiled an overall record of 5–7 with a mark of 3–5 in conference play, tying for sixth place in the SoCon.

== Schedule ==
Date	Time	Opponent	Site	TV	Result	Attendance	Source
August 30	6:00 p.m.	at No. 16 (I-A) NC State*	Carter–Finley Stadium; Raleigh, NC		L 20–59	53,800	
September 5	6:00 p.m.	at Duke*	Wallace Wade Stadium; Durham, NC		L 3–29	18,022	
September 13	6:00 p.m.	Johnson C. Smith*	Bob Waters Field at E. J. Whitmire Stadium; Cullowhee, NC		W 45–0	10,083	
September 20	3:30 p.m.	The Citadel	Bob Waters Field at E. J. Whitmire Stadium; Cullowhee, NC	TFN	W 28–21	8,549	
September 27	1:00 p.m.	at East Tennessee State	Memorial Center; Johnson City, TN		W 28–21	4,868	
October 4	6:00 p.m.	No. 6 Furman	Bob Waters Field at E. J. Whitmire Stadium; Cullowhee, NC		L 13–19	10,557	
October 11	1:00 p.m.	at No. 11 Georgia Southern	Paulson Stadium; Statesboro, GA		L 25–31	15,708	
October 18	2:00 p.m.	No. 8 Wofford^{†}	Bob Waters Field at E. J. Whitmire Stadium; Cullowhee, NC		L 6–38	11,021	
October 25	6:00 p.m.	at Chattanooga	Finley Stadium; Chattanooga, TN		L 0–38	6,693	
November 1	2:00 p.m.	Elon	Bob Waters Field at E. J. Whitmire Stadium; Cullowhee, NC		W 26–3	7,994	
November 15	2:00 p.m.	at Appalachian State	Kidd Brewer Stadium; Boone, NC (rivalry)		L 18–26	14,443	
November 22	2:00 p.m.	Gardner–Webb*	Bob Waters Field at E. J. Whitmire Stadium; Cullowhee, NC		W 39–16	8,028	
*Non-conference game; ^{†}Homecoming; Rankings from The Sports Network Poll released prior to the game; All times are in Eastern time
