= 2003 Chattanooga Mocs football team =

American college football season

2003 Chattanooga Mocs football
- Conference: Southern Conference
- Record: 3–9 (3–5 SoCon)
- Head coach: Rodney Allison (1st season)
- Offensive coordinator: Jason Simpson (1st season)
- Defensive coordinator: Gwaine Mathews (1st season)
- Home stadium: Finley Stadium

2003 Southern Conference football standings
	Conf.			Overall
Team	W		L	W		L
No. 3 Wofford $^	8	–	0	12	–	2
Appalachian State	6	–	2	7	–	4
No. 24 Georgia Southern	5	–	3	7	–	4
Furman	4	–	4	6	–	5
The Citadel	4	–	4	6	–	6
Western Carolina	3	–	5	5	–	7
Chattanooga	3	–	5	3	–	9
East Tennessee State	2	–	6	5	–	7
Elon	1	–	7	2	–	10
$ – Conference champion; ^ – NCAA Division I-AA playoff participant; Rankings from The Sports Network I-AA Poll

The 2003 Chattanooga Mocs football team represented the University of Tennessee at Chattanooga as a member of the Southern Conference (SoCon) in the 2003 NCAA Division I-AA football season. The Mocs were led by first-year head coach Rodney Allison and played their home games at Finley Stadium. They finished the season 3–9 overall and 3–5 in SoCon play to tie for sixth place.

== Schedule ==
Date	Time	Opponent	Site	Result	Attendance	Source
August 28	8:00 p.m.	Samford*	Finley Stadium; Chattanooga, TN	L 23–31	9,003	
September 6	7:00 p.m.	at Vanderbilt*	Vanderbilt Stadium; Nashville, TN	L 6–51	26,176	
September 13	6:00 p.m.	Tennessee Tech*	Finley Stadium; Chattanooga, TN	L 10–35	7,802	
September 20	6:00 p.m.	at Gardner–Webb*	Ernest W. Spangler Stadium; Boiling Springs, NC	L 13–23	3,789	
September 27	6:00 p.m.	at No. 16 Georgia Southern	Paulson Stadium; Statesboro, GA	L 3–34	18,623	
October 4	4:00 p.m.	No. 12 Wofford^{†}	Finley Stadium; Chattanooga, TN	L 14–42	7,409	
October 18	2:00 p.m.	at Elon	Rhodes Stadium; Elon, NC	W 24–7	3,271	
October 25	6:00 p.m.	Western Carolina	Finley Stadium; Chattanooga, TN	W 38–0	6,693	
November 1	2:00 p.m.	at No. 6 Appalachian State	Kidd Brewer Stadium; Boone, NC	L 7–47	8,753	
November 8	6:00 p.m.	The Citadel	Finley Stadium; Chattanooga, TN	W 29–20	6,079	
November 15	1:00 p.m.	at East Tennessee State	Memorial Center; Johnson City, TN	L 7–68	4,419	
November 22	3:30 p.m.	Furman	Finley Stadium; Chattanooga, TN	L 21–63	5,044	
*Non-conference game; ^{†}Homecoming; Rankings from The Sports Network Poll released prior to the game; All times are in Eastern time
