= 2003 The Citadel Bulldogs football team =

American college football season

2003 The Citadel Bulldogs football
- Conference: Southern Conference
- Record: 6–6 (4–4 SoCon)
- Head coach: Ellis Johnson (3rd season)
- Offensive coordinator: John Zernhelt (1st season)
- Defensive coordinator: Les Herrin (3rd season)
- Home stadium: Johnson Hagood Stadium

2003 Southern Conference football standings
	Conf.			Overall
Team	W		L	W		L
No. 3 Wofford $^	8	–	0	12	–	2
Appalachian State	6	–	2	7	–	4
No. 24 Georgia Southern	5	–	3	7	–	4
Furman	4	–	4	6	–	5
The Citadel	4	–	4	6	–	6
Western Carolina	3	–	5	4	–	7
Chattanooga	3	–	5	3	–	9
East Tennessee State	2	–	6	5	–	7
Elon	1	–	7	2	–	10
$ – Conference champion; ^ – NCAA Division I-AA playoff participant; Rankings from The Sports Network I-AA Poll

The 2003 The Citadel Bulldogs football team represented The Citadel, The Military College of South Carolina in the 2003 NCAA Division I-AA football season. Ellis Johnson served as head coach for the third season. The Bulldogs played as members of the Southern Conference and played home games at Johnson Hagood Stadium.

== Schedule ==
Date	Time	Opponent	Rank	Site	TV	Result	Attendance	Source
August 30	3:30 pm	Charleston Southern*		Johnson Hagood Stadium; Charleston, SC		W 64–10	15,219	
September 6	7:00 pm	at No. 14 Delaware*		Delaware Stadium; Newark, DE		L 7–41	20,612	
September 13	6:00 pm	at Maryland*		Byrd Stadium; College Park, MD		L 0–61	51,594	
September 20	3:30 pm	at Western Carolina		E. J. Whitmire Stadium; Cullowhee, NC	TFN	L 21–28	8,549	
September 27	2:00 pm	Appalachian State		Johnson Hagood Stadium; Charleston, SC		W 24–21	13,569	
October 4	2:00 pm	Elon		Johnson Hagood Stadium; Charleston, SC		W 31–7	17,102	
October 18	3:30 pm	No. 13 Furman		Johnson Hagood Stadium; Charleston, SC (rivalry)	CSS	W 10–9	17,041	
October 25	1:00 pm	at No. 10 Georgia Southern		Paulson Stadium; Statesboro, GA		W 28–24	15,988	
November 1	2:00 pm	No. 5 Wofford^{†}	No. 25	Johnson Hagood Stadium; Charleston, SC (rivalry)		L 16–42	20,863	
November 8	6:00 pm	at Chattanooga		Finley Stadium; Chattanooga, TN		L 20–29	6,079	
November 15	1:30 pm	vs. VMI*		American Legion Memorial Stadium; Charlotte, NC (Military Classic of the South)		W 27–23	11,336	
November 22	1:00 pm	at East Tennessee State		Memorial Center; Johnson City, TN		L 13–16	5,911	
*Non-conference game; ^{†}Homecoming; Rankings from The Sports Network Poll released prior to the game; All times are in Eastern time
