= Mike Sewak =

American football player and coach (born 1958)

Biographical details
- Born: September 3, 1958 (age 68)

Playing career
- 1977–1980: Virginia
- Position: Offensive lineman

Coaching career (HC unless noted)
- 1982–1983: Hobart (OC/OL)
- 1984: Georgia Tech (TE/GA)
- 1985–1986: Georgia Southern (RB)
- 1987: Hawaii (WR)
- 1988–1994: Hawaii (OL)
- 1995–1996: Ohio (OC)
- 1997–2001: Georgia Southern (OC)
- 2002–2005: Georgia Southern
- 2008–2018: Georgia Tech (OL)

Head coaching record
- Overall: 35–14
- Tournaments: 2–3 (NCAA D-I-AA playoffs)

Accomplishments and honors

Championships
- 2 SoCon (2003–2004)

Mike Sewak is an American former college football player and coach. He served as the head football coach at Georgia Southern University from 2002 to 2005, compiling a record of 35–14. He retired after the 2018 season as an assistant coach at the Georgia Institute of Technology.

== Head coaching record ==
Year	Team	Overall	Conference	Standing	Bowl/playoffs	TSN^{#}
Georgia Southern Eagles (Southern Conference) (2002–2005)
2002	Georgia Southern	11–3	7–1	1st	L NCAA Division I-AA Semifinal	3
2003	Georgia Southern	7–4	5–3	3rd		24
2004	Georgia Southern	10–3	6–1	T–1st	L NCAA Division I-AA First Round	10
2005	Georgia Southern	8–4	5–2	T–2nd	L NCAA Division I-AA First Round	9
Georgia Southern:		35–14	23–7			
Total:		35–14				
National championship Conference title Conference division title or championship game berth
