= Delaware Fightin' Blue Hens football =

Football team in Delaware

2026 Delaware Fightin' Blue Hens football team
- First season: 1889; 137 years ago
- Head coach: Ryan Carty; 4th season, 34–17 (.667)
- Location: Newark, Delaware, U.S.
- Stadium: Delaware Stadium (capacity: 18,500)
- Field: Tubby Raymond Field
- NCAA division: Division I FBS
- Conference: Conference USA
- Colors: Royal blue and gold
- All-time record: 747–491–44 (.600)
- Playoff record: 33–22 (.600)
- Bowl record: 9–3 (.750)

NCAA Division I FCS championships
- 2003

NCAA Division II championships
- 1979

Small college national championships
- 1946, 1963, 1971, 1972

Conference championships
- Mason–Dixon: 1946 MAC: 1959, 1962, 1963, 1966, 1968, 1969 Yankee: 1986, 1988, 1991, 1992, 1995 A-10: 2000, 2003, 2004 CAA: 2010, 2020
- Rivalries: James Madison (rivalry); Lehigh (rivalry); Delaware State (rivalry); Villanova (rivalry); William & Mary (rivalry)
- Fight song: "The Delaware Fight Song"
- Mascot: YoUDee
- Marching band: Fightin' Blue Hen Marching Band
- Outfitter: Adidas
- Website: bluehens.com/football

The Delaware Fightin' Blue Hens football team represents the University of Delaware (UD) in National Collegiate Athletic Association (NCAA) Division I Football Bowl Subdivision (FBS) college football as a member of Conference USA. The team is led by head coach Ryan Carty and plays on Tubby Raymond Field at 18,500-seat Delaware Stadium located in Newark, Delaware. The Fightin' Blue Hens have won six national titles in their 117-year history – 1946 (AP College Division), 1963 (UPI College Division), 1971 (AP/UPI College Division), 1972 (AP/UPI College Division), 1979 (Division II), and 2003 (Division I-AA). They returned to the FCS National Championship game in 2007 and 2010.

The program has produced six NFL quarterbacks: Rich Gannon, Joe Flacco, Jeff Komlo, Pat Devlin, Andy Hall, and Scott Brunner. The Blue Hens were recognized as a perennial power in FCS football and Delaware was the only FCS program to average more than 20,000 fans per regular-season home game for each season from 1999 to 2010.

In 2023, the program announced it will move into Conference USA and the Football Bowl Subdivision (FBS) prior to the 2025 season.

== History ==
=== Early years ===
The program began in the late 1800s, but its tradition did not truly develop until the arrival of Bill Murray in 1940. During his 11 seasons at the helm, the Fightin' Blue Hens compiled a record of 49–16–2 with one National Championship in 1946, which culminated in a win over Rollins in the now-defunct Cigar Bowl. That was good for an impressive .747 winning percentage. After Murray departed to take over at Duke University in 1950, David M. Nelson came on board as head coach.

=== 20th century ===
During his time at Delaware, Nelson developed the Delaware Wing-T offensive system. This system, strongly rooted in running the football and deceptive fake hand-offs, became the identity of Delaware football for nearly 50 years. Nelson also brought with him another icon of Delaware football: the "winged" helmet. The iconic Michigan-style helmet was developed by Nelson's coach at Michigan, Fritz Crisler, who first used the helmet design when he was head coach at Princeton, though in black and orange. Nelson played for Crisler when Crisler was head coach at Michigan, and Nelson brought the helmet design with him to every team he coached (Hillsdale College, Harvard, Maine and Delaware). Nelson stepped down as football coach in 1965, and in his 15 years (1951–1965), the Hens compiled an 84–42–2 (.664) record with one National Championship in 1963 and a bowl win over Kent State in the now-defunct Refrigerator Bowl.

In 1966, an assistant football and baseball coach named Harold "Tubby" Raymond took over, and after a rocky start (the team recorded a 2–7 record in his second season) became the face of Delaware football for 36 seasons. While Nelson developed the Delaware Wing-T, Raymond perfected it. When he retired in 2001, Raymond had racked up 300 wins against 119 losses and three ties, good for a .714 win percentage. His teams earned 14 Lambert Cup Trophies (as the best team in the east in a particular division), four national semi-finals, and three National Championships in 1971, 1972, and 1979. His 300 wins account for nearly half of the football victories in school history. These three men (Murray, Nelson and Raymond) are all enshrined in the College Football Hall of Fame in Atlanta. Georgia Tech is the only other school to place three consecutive coaches into the College Football Hall of Fame.

Notable program victories include multiple wins over Football Bowl Subdivision (FBS) schools Navy (including a win at Navy's Homecoming game during a year when they went to a bowl game), Maryland, Rutgers, and Temple. Speculation regularly exists regarding whether the Blue Hens will "move up" to the FBS level at some point. The University of Delaware has more than 60 wins against opponents playing at the highest level, whether that was FBS (since 2006), I-A, or the University level (prior to 1978). However, whereas most I-AA schools move up because of the perception of increased money and prestige, UD has an extremely profitable football program, and it is already well-regarded academically and athletically.

"We're the LSU; we're the Georgia, the Florida of Division I-AA", Delaware coach K. C. Keeler said in American Football Monthly in September 2004. "We have every resource. There's some people who have better resources than we do, but in general, the college campus we have is in one of the greatest college towns in America, and the academics ... we led the nation last year in out-of-state applications, more than Michigan or Texas. But that's what this school has become – everybody wants to come to school here."

While most schools at the FCS level can expect 8,000–10,000 fans for a football game on a good day, the Fightin' Blue Hens can expect sellout crowds of over 22,000 at every home contest; Delaware was the only FCS program to average more than 20,000 fans per regular-season home game for each season from 1999 to 2010. Since Delaware Stadium opened in 1952, it has undergone four major expansions to come to its current capacity of 22,000 (in the 1970s it actually seated over 23,000, but subsequent modifications have reduced the capacity to the current number).

In 1973, a home attendance record was set on October 27 against Temple University with 23,619 fans, and attendance has exceeded 22,000 fans frequently. When the Fightin' Blue Hens have a home game, the stadium population becomes the fourth largest city in Delaware behind Wilmington, Dover, and Newark. Maine head coach Jack Cosgrove told Keeler that playing Delaware at Delaware Stadium is the highlight of many of his players' collegiate careers because of their large fan support.

=== 21st century ===
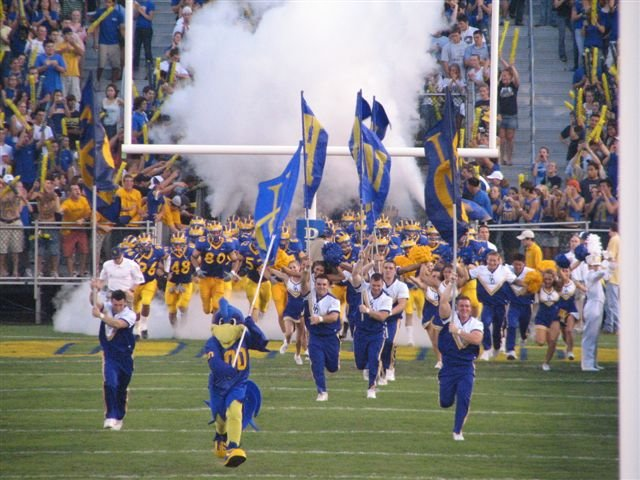
The Delaware Fightin' Blue Hens entering the field in 2006

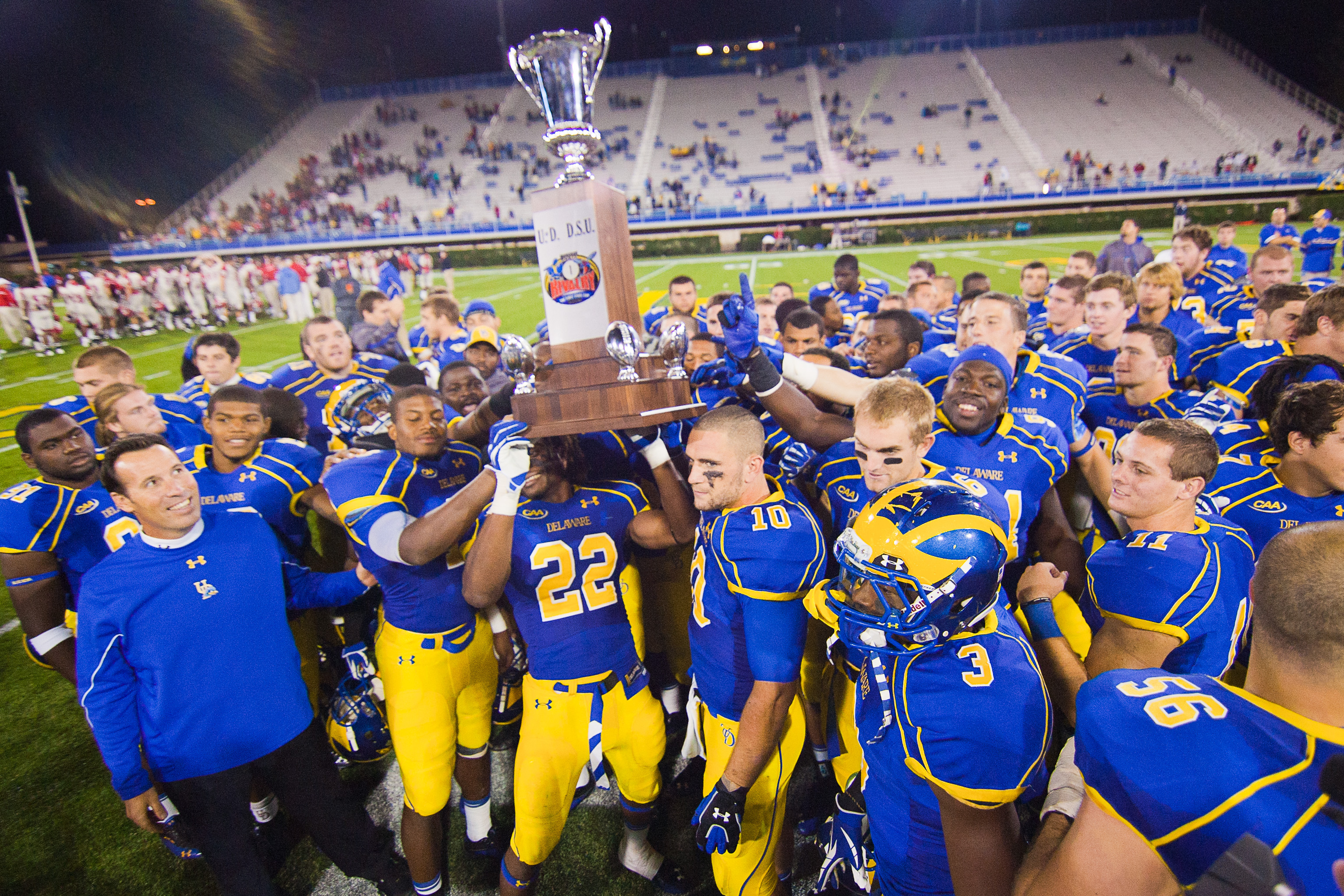
Delaware players with first state cup trophy after defeating Delaware State 45–0, 2011

In June 2008, Keeler was granted a 10-year contract extension that was intended to keep him on as head coach of the Blue Hens through the 2017 season. The Homecoming Game versus William & Mary on October 18, 2008, marked the first time in 18 years that the Fightin' Blue Hens did not score a touchdown in a home game. The final score of 27–3 also made Delaware's third straight loss scoring ten points or fewer for the first time since the end of the 1983 season. Delaware's eighth loss, to Villanova University in the final game of the season, ended a season with eight losses for the first time in 117 seasons. The Fightin' Blue Hens were one of only four teams in the NCAA to never lose eight games in a season; the others are Michigan, which lost its eighth game a week before the Hens the same season, Tennessee, and Ohio State.

On January 7, 2014, Keeler was fired following the 2012 season in which his team posted a 5−6 record. Delaware hired Rutgers offensive coordinator Dave Brock as the team's head coach on January 18, 2013.

Brock was unable to maintain any of the success or momentum of his predecessors, could not recruit as successfully as his predecessors, and oversaw a precipitous decline in the program's on and off field fortunes. He became the first head coach in the 90+ year history of Delaware football to be fired in-season, on October 17, 2016. He was replaced on an interim basis by assistant coach Dennis Dottin-Carter, who completed the 2016 season. The team never made the FCS playoffs under his tenure. The team hired Richmond head coach Danny Rocco on December 13, 2016. Rocco was fired at the end of the 2021 season.

With a September 7, 2019 victory over the Rhode Island Rams, Delaware became the 39th team in the NCAA with 700 wins.

On December 10, 2021, Delaware named former UD quarterback Ryan Carty as their new head coach. Carty spent 11 years on the New Hampshire coaching staff, and spent 4 years as offensive coordinator at Sam Houston State under Keeler.

On November 28, 2023, Delaware and Conference USA (CUSA) announced that the Blue Hens would begin the transition process to the Football Bowl Subdivision after the 2023 season, to join Conference USA beginning in 2025. UD played in the CAA in 2024, but was not eligible for the FCS playoffs due to NCAA rules for transitioning programs.

== Head coaches ==
Year	Coach	Overall	Conference	Standing	Bowl/playoffs	Rank^{#}	
Gus Ziegler (Independent) (1929–1930)
1929	Gus Ziegler	0–7–1					
1930	Gus Ziegler	6–3–1					
Gus Ziegler:		6–10–2					
Charles Rogers (Independent) (1931–1933)
1931	Charles Rogers	5–1–2			Class B Eastern Co–Champions		
1932	Charles Rogers	5–4					
1933	Charles Rogers	2–4–2					
Charles Rogers:		12–9–4					
J. Neil Stahley (Independent) (1934)
1934	J. Neil Stahley	4–3–1					
J. Neil Stahley:		4–3–1					
Lyal Clark (Independent) (1935–1937)
1935	Lyal Clark	2–5–1					
1936	Lyal Clark	2–6					
1937	Lyal Clark	1–7					
Lyal Clark:		5–18–1					
Stephen Grenda (Independent) (1938–1939)
1938	Stephen Grenda	3–5					
1939	Stephen Grenda	1–7					
Stephen Grenda:		4–12					
William D. Murray (Independent) (1940–1942)
1940	William D. Murray	5–3					
1941	William D. Murray	7–0–1					
1942	William D. Murray	8–0					
William D. Murray (Mason-Dixon Conference) (1946)
1946	William D. Murray	10–0		1st	W Rollins Cigar Bowl		19
William D. Murray (Independent) (1947–1950)
1947	William D. Murray	4–4					
1948	William D. Murray	5–3					
1949	William D. Murray	8–1					
1950	William D. Murray	2–5–1					
William D. Murray:		49–16–2					
David M. Nelson (Independent) (1951–1957)
1951	David Nelson	5–3					
1952	David Nelson	4–4					
1953	David Nelson	7–1					
1954	David Nelson	8–2			W Kent State Refrigerator Bowl		
1955	David Nelson	8–1					
1956	David Nelson	5–3–1					
1957	David Nelson	4–3					
David Nelson (MAC) (1958–1965)
1958	David Nelson	5–3	2–3	5th			
1959	David Nelson	8–1	5–0	1st			
1960	David Nelson	2–6–1	1–4	6th			
1961	David Nelson	4–4	3–2	3rd			
1962	David Nelson	7–2	5–0	1st		9	
1963	David Nelson	8–0	4–0	1st		1	2
1964	David Nelson	4–5	3–3	4th			
1965	David Nelson	5–4	3–3	4th			
David Nelson:		84–42–2					
Tubby Raymond (MAC) (1966–1969)
1966	Tubby Raymond	6–3	6–0	1st			
1967	Tubby Raymond	2–7	2–3	4th			
1968	Tubby Raymond	8–3	5–0	1st	W Indiana (PA) Boardwalk Bowl		
1969	Tubby Raymond	9–2	6–0	1st	W North Carolina Central Boardwalk Bowl	10	10
Tubby Raymond (D-II Independent) (1970–1979)
1970	Tubby Raymond	9–2			W Morgan State Boardwalk Bowl	8	11
1971	Tubby Raymond	10–1			W C.W. Post Boardwalk Bowl	1	1
1972	Tubby Raymond	10–0				1	1
1973	Tubby Raymond	8–4			L Grambling State NCAA Division II First Round	10	3
1974	Tubby Raymond	12–2			L Central Michigan NCAA Division II Championship Game	3	4
1975	Tubby Raymond	8–3					
1976	Tubby Raymond	8–3–1			L Northern Michigan NCAA Division II First Round	4	1
1977	Tubby Raymond	6–3–1					
1978	Tubby Raymond	10–4			L Eastern Illinois NCAA Division II Championship Game	3	
1979	Tubby Raymond	13–1			W Youngstown State NCAA Division II National Champions	1	
Tubby Raymond (I-AA Independent) (1980–1985)
1980	Tubby Raymond	9–2				6	
1981	Tubby Raymond	9–3			L Eastern Kentucky NCAA Division I-AA First Round	7	
1982	Tubby Raymond	12–2			L Eastern Kentucky NCAA Division I-AA Championship Game	3	
1983	Tubby Raymond	4–7					
1984	Tubby Raymond	8–3				19	
1985	Tubby Raymond	7–4					
Tubby Raymond (Yankee Conference) (1986–1996)
1986	Tubby Raymond	9–4	5–2	1st	L Arkansas State NCAA Division I-AA Quarterfinal	13	
1987	Tubby Raymond	5–6	2–5	5th			
1988	Tubby Raymond	7–5	6–2	1st	L Furman NCAA Division I-AA First Round	15	
1989	Tubby Raymond	7–4	5–3	4th			
1990	Tubby Raymond	6–5	5–3	2nd			
1991	Tubby Raymond	10–2	7–1	1st	L James Madison NCAA Division I-AA First Round	6	
1992	Tubby Raymond	11–3	7–1	1st	L Marshall NCAA Division I-AA Semifinal	8	
1993	Tubby Raymond	9–4	6–2	2nd	L Marshall NCAA Division I-AA Quarterfinal	18	
1994	Tubby Raymond	7–3–1	5–3	3rd			
1995	Tubby Raymond	11–2	8–0	1st	L McNeese State NCAA Division I-AA Quarterfinal	6	
1996	Tubby Raymond	8–4	6–2	2nd	L Marshall NCAA Division I-AA First Round	10	
Tubby Raymond (A10) (1997–2001)
1997	Tubby Raymond	12–2	7–1	1st	L McNeese State NCAA Division I-AA Semifinal	3	3
1998	Tubby Raymond	7–4	4–4	2nd		23	24
1999	Tubby Raymond	7–4	5–3	2nd			
2000	Tubby Raymond	12–2	7–1	1st	L Georgia Southern NCAA Division I-AA Semifinal	3	3
2001	Tubby Raymond	4–6	4–5	6th			
Tubby Raymond:		300–119–3					
K. C. Keeler (A10) (2002–2006)
2002	K. C. Keeler	6–6	4–5	6th			
2003	K. C. Keeler	15–1	8–1	1st	W Colgate NCAA Division I-AA Championship Game	1	1
2004	K. C. Keeler	9–4	7–1	1st	L William & Mary NCAA Division I-AA Quarterfinal	7	8
2005	K.C. Keeler	6–5	3–5	3rd			
2006	K. C. Keeler	5–6	3–5	4th			
K.C. Keeler (CAA South) (2007–2009)
2007	K. C. Keeler	11–4	5–3	3rd	L Appalachian State NCAA Division I Championship Game	2	2
2008	K. C. Keeler	4–8	2–6	5th			
2009	K. C. Keeler	6–5	4–4	4th			
K.C. Keeler (CAA) (2010–2012)
2010	K. C. Keeler	12–3	6–2	1st	L Eastern Washington NCAA Division I Championship Game	2	2
2011	K. C. Keeler	7–4	5–3	5th		20	17
2012	K. C. Keeler	5–6	2–6	8th			
K. C. Keeler:		86–52					
Dave Brock (CAA) (2013–2016)
2013	Dave Brock	7−5	4−4	5th			
2014	Dave Brock	6−6	4−4	6th			
2015	Dave Brock	4−7	3−5	T−8th			
2016	Dave Brock*	2−4	0−3	T−12th	* Fired after six games in 2016		
Dave Brock:		19−23					
Dennis Dottin-Carter (interim coach) (CAA) (2016)
2016	Dennis Dottin-Carter (interim coach)	2−3	2–3				
Dennis Dottin-Carter:		2−3					
Danny Rocco (CAA) (2017–2021)
2017	Danny Rocco	7−4	5−3	T–4th			
2018	Danny Rocco	7–5	5–4	T–3rd	L James Madison NCAA Division I First Round		
2019	Danny Rocco	5−7	3−5	T–9th			
2020	Danny Rocco	7–1	4–0	1st (North)	L South Dakota State NCAA Division I Semifinal	4	4
2021	Danny Rocco	5–6	3–5	T–9th			
Danny Rocco:		31−23					
Ryan Carty (CAA) (2022–2024)
2022	Ryan Carty	8−5	4−4	6th	L South Dakota State NCAA Division I Second Round	19	24 (tie)
2023	Ryan Carty	9−4	6−2	T-4th	L Montana NCAA Division I Second Round	11	10
2024	Ryan Carty	9−2	6−2	T-3rd			
Ryan Carty (C-USA) (2025–present)
2025	Ryan Carty	7−6	4−4	7th	W Louisiana 68 Ventures Bowl		
Ryan Carty:		33−18	20–12				
Total:		748–491–44					
National championship Conference title Conference division title or championship game berth
^{†}Indicates Bowl Coalition, Bowl Alliance, BCS, or CFP / New Years' Six bowl.; ^{#}Rankings from final Coaches Poll.

== Conference affiliations ==
- 1889–1945: Independent
- 1946: Mason–Dixon Conference
- 1947–1955: Independent
- 1956–1957: NCAA College Division Independent
- 1958–1969: Middle Atlantic Conference (NCAA College Division)
- 1970–1972: NCAA College Division Independent
- 1973–1979: NCAA Division II Independent
- 1980–1985: NCAA Division I-AA Independent
- 1986–1996: Yankee Conference (NCAA Division I-AA)
- 1997–2006: Atlantic 10 Conference (NCAA Division I-AA/FCS)
- 2007–2024: CAA Football (NCAA Division I FCS)
- 2025-: Conference USA (NCAA Division I FBS)

== Postseason results ==
=== Championships ===
==== National championships (6) ====
Year	Coach	Selectors	Record	Bowl
1946	Bill Murray	AP (small college)	10–0	Won Cigar Bowl
1963	David Nelson	UPI (College Division)	8–0	
1971	Tubby Raymond	AP & UPI (College Division)	10–1	Won Boardwalk Bowl
1972	Tubby Raymond	AP & UPI (College Division)	10–0	
1979	Tubby Raymond	NCAA Division II Playoffs	13–1	Won NCAA Division II Championship
2003	K. C. Keeler	NCAA Division I-AA Playoffs	15–1	Won NCAA Division I-AA National Championship Game

==== Conference championships (17) ====
Year	Coach	Conference	Overall record	Conference record
1946	Bill Murray	Mason-Dixon Conference	10–0	3–0
1959	David Nelson	Middle Atlantic Conference	8–1	5–0
1962	David Nelson	Middle Atlantic Conference	7–2	5–0
1963	David Nelson	Middle Atlantic Conference	8–0	4–0
1966	Tubby Raymond	Middle Atlantic Conference	6–3	6–0
1968	Tubby Raymond	Middle Atlantic Conference	8–3	5–0
1969	Tubby Raymond	Middle Atlantic Conference	9–2	6–0
1986†	Tubby Raymond	Yankee Conference	9–4	5–2
1988†	Tubby Raymond	Yankee Conference	7–5	6–2
1991†	Tubby Raymond	Yankee Conference	10–2	7–1
1992	Tubby Raymond	Yankee Conference	11–3	7–1
1995	Tubby Raymond	Yankee Conference	11–2	8–0
2000†	Tubby Raymond	Atlantic 10 Conference	12–2	7–1
2003†	K. C. Keeler	Atlantic 10 Conference	15–1	8–1
2004†	K. C. Keeler	Atlantic 10 Conference	9–4	7–1
2010†	K. C. Keeler	CAA Football	12–3	6–2
2020	Danny Rocco	CAA Football	7–1	4−0

† Co-champions

=== Bowl games ===
Delaware has participated in twelve bowl games, holding a record of 8–3 in non-Division I bowl games and a record of 1–0 in Division I bowl games.

Year	Bowl	Coach	Opponent	Result
1946	Cigar Bowl	William D. Murray	Rollins	W 21–7
1954	Refrigerator Bowl	David M. Nelson	Kent State	W 19–7
1968	Boardwalk Bowl	Tubby Raymond	IUP	W 31–24
1969	Boardwalk Bowl	Tubby Raymond	North Carolina Central	W 31–13
1970	Boardwalk Bowl	Tubby Raymond	Morgan State	W 38–23
1971	Boardwalk Bowl	Tubby Raymond	LIU Post	W 72–22
1973	Boardwalk Bowl	Tubby Raymond	Grambling State	L 8–17
1974	Grantland Rice Bowl	Tubby Raymond	UNLV	W 49–11
1974	Camellia Bowl	Tubby Raymond	Central Michigan	L 14–54
1979	Zia Bowl	Tubby Raymond	Youngstown State	W 38–21
1982	Pioneer Bowl	Tubby Raymond	Eastern Kentucky	L 14–17
2025	68 Ventures Bowl	Ryan Carty	Louisiana	W 20–13

=== Division I-AA/FCS playoffs ===
The Fightin' Blue Hens have nineteen appearances in the Division I-AA/FCS Playoffs. Their combined record was 25–18. They were I-AA National Champions in 2003.

Year	Round	Opponent	Result
1981	Quarterfinals	Eastern Kentucky	L 28–35
1982	Quarterfinals; Semifinals; National Championship Game	Colgate; Louisiana Tech; Eastern Kentucky	W 20–13; W 17–0; L 14–17
1986	First Round; Quarterfinals	William & Mary; Arkansas State	W 51–17; L 14–55
1988	First Round	Furman	L 7–21
1991	First Round	James Madison	L 35–42
1992	First Round; Quarterfinals; Semifinals	Samford; Louisiana–Monroe; Marshall	W 56–21; W 41–18; L 7–28
1993	First Round; Quarterfinals	Montana; Marshall	W 49–48; L 31–34
1995	First Round; Quarterfinals	Hofstra; McNeese State	W 38–17; L 18–52
1996	First Round	Marshall	L 14–59
1997	First Round; Quarterfinals; Semifinals	Hofstra; Georgia Southern; McNeese State	W 24–14; W 16–7; L 21–23
2000	First Round; Quarterfinals; Semifinals	Portland State; Lehigh; Georgia Southern	W 49–14; W 47–22; L 27–18
2003	First Round; Quarterfinals; Semifinals; National Championship Game	Southern Illinois; Northern Iowa; Wofford; Colgate	W 48–7; W 37–7; W 24–9; W 40–0
2004	First Round; Quarterfinals	Lafayette; William & Mary	W 28–14; L 38–44
2007	First Round; Quarterfinals; Semifinals; National Championship Game	Delaware State; Northern Iowa; Southern Illinois; Appalachian State	W 44–7; W 39–27; W 20–17; L 21–49
2010	First Round; Quarterfinals; Semifinals; National Championship Game	Lehigh; New Hampshire; Georgia Southern; Eastern Washington	W 42–20; W 16–3; W 27–10; L 19–20
2018	First Round	James Madison	L 6–20
2020	First Round; Quarterfinals; Semifinals	Sacred Heart; Jacksonville State; South Dakota State	W 19–10; W 20–14; L 3–33
2022	First Round; Second Round	St. Francis; South Dakota State	W 56–17; L 6–42
2023	First Round; Second Round	Lafayette; Montana	W 36–34; L 19–49

=== Division II playoffs results ===
The Fightin' Blue Hens have appeared in the Division II playoffs five times with an overall record of 7–4. They were Division II National Champions in 1979.

Year	Round	Opponent	Result
1973	Quarterfinals	Grambling State	L 8–17
1974	Quarterfinals; Semifinals; National Championship Game	Youngstown State; UNLV; Central Michigan	W 35–14; W 49–11; L 14–54
1976	Quarterfinals	Northern Michigan	L 17–28
1978	Quarterfinals; Semifinals; National Championship Game	Jacksonville State; Winston-Salem State; Eastern Illinois	W 42–21; W 41–0; L 9–10
1979	Quarterfinals; Semifinals; National Championship Game	Virginia Union; Mississippi College; Youngstown State	W 58–28; W 60–10; W 38–21

== Rivalries ==
=== Delaware State ===
Delaware and Delaware State first played against each other on November 23, 2007, in Newark, Delaware, in the first round of the NCAA Division I National Championship Tournament. The Blue Hens defeated the Hornets 44–7 in front of 19,765 people, the largest playoff crowd in Delaware Stadium history.

Prior to the 2009 season, the University of Delaware had not scheduled a regular season game versus Delaware State University, the state's other Football Championship Subdivision team. A 2007 guest editorial at ESPN.com's Page 2 claimed that this has to do with the fact that Delaware State is a Historically Black College. However, Delaware has scheduled and played regular season games against several other Historically Black Colleges and Universities such as Morgan State University and North Carolina A&T.

On February 25, 2009, coach K.C. Keeler joined Delaware State University coach Al Lavan along with school officials and state politicians in Dover, Delaware, to announce that their schools had signed on to play the first regular season game in their history. Additionally, a three-game series was scheduled for September 2012, 2013, and 2014. All games in the series were held at Delaware Stadium in Newark, because its seating capacity of 22,000 is much larger than that of Delaware State's Alumni Stadium. The schools had been engaged in talks to play a game as early as 2009, but Furman University, which had previously signed a contract to play a home-and-away series with UD, backed out of game two which was scheduled to be played at UD in order to play University of Missouri and garner a larger payday. This left the University of Delaware with an open date to fill with only a few months before the season started and the two sides quickly completed the deal.

The first game was played on September 19, 2009, at Delaware Stadium, with the winning Blue Hens receiving the new traveling trophy, the First State Cup, following a 27–17 victory. Delaware has been victorious in each of their ten subsequent match-ups (2011, 2012, 2013, 2014, 2016, 2017, 2019, 2021, 2022, 2025).

=== James Madison ===
Delaware regularly played James Madison as conference opponents in the CAA, with the first matchup occurring in 1983. During the divisional era of the CAA, the game was played as an annual CAA South divisional matchup. As both teams had sustained success, games between the two schools often had conference and even national implications, and the series quickly grew into a rivalry as a result.

During this period, the teams combined for three National Championships (Delaware in 2003, James Madison in 2004 and 2016), four National Runners-up (Delaware in 2007 and 2010, James Madison in 2017 and 2019), and fifteen Conference Championships (Delaware in 1995, 1997, 2000, 2003, 2004, 2010 and 2020, and James Madison in 1999, 2004, 2008, 2015, 2016, 2017, 2019, and 2021).

In 2020, as a result of the Covid-19 Pandemic, the CAA split into divisions for the first time since 2009. Delaware was placed into the large North division, whereas JMU was placed in the four-team South division. With no crossover games, the rivalry was paused for this season. Despite this, the rivalry was only intensified, as both James Madison and Delaware went undefeated, and with no championship game, the CAA chose to award Delaware the conference title (as they had played in the North Division which held the vast majority of the conference's teams and therefore played not only a harder schedule but more unique conference opponents) giving them the automatic bid into the FCS Playoffs. (JMU was given an honorary "CAA South" title, as well as ultimately being selected as an at-large team into the FCS Playoffs.) In the playoffs, both Delaware and James Madison won two games each before being eliminated in the semi-finals by Sam Houston and Montana State.

When James Madison left the CAA in 2021 to join the FBS and the Sun Belt Conference, the rivalry was put on hold.

In 2023, it was announced that Delaware too would leave the CAA to join the FBS, with them joining Conference USA in 2025. With both teams now back in the same football subdivision, a four-game non-conference series was scheduled, starting in 2027.

In the 2025 release of the annual college football video game franchise, EA Sports College Football 26, the matchup was listed as a rivalry, Delaware's only rivalry in the game.

== Notable players ==
=== Active ===
- QB Joe Flacco – Baltimore Ravens (2008–2018), Denver Broncos (2019), New York Jets (2020), Philadelphia Eagles (2021), New York Jets (2021–2022), Cleveland Browns (2023), Indianapolis Colts (2024), Cleveland Browns (2025), Cincinnati Bengals (2025–present); Super Bowl XLVII Most Valuable Player
- LB Troy Reeder – Los Angeles Rams (2019–2021), Los Angeles Chargers (2022), Los Angeles Rams (2023–2025), New York Jets (2026–present); won Super Bowl LVI
- S Kedrick Whitehead Jr. – Michigan Panthers (2024–2025), Columbus Aviators (2026–present)
- RB Marcus Yarns – Houston Gamblers (2026–present)

=== Former ===
- DB Mike Adams
- S Nasir Adderley
- TE Robbie Agnone
- DB Kenny Bailey
- TE Josh Baker
- RB Nate Beasley
- WR Joe Bleymaier
- T Urban Bowman
- TE Nick Boyle
- QB Scott Brunner
- B Nick Bucci
- LB Johnny Buchanan
- CB Marcus Burley
- RB Keith Burnell
- OL Mike Byrne
- TE Brennan Carroll
- QB Ryan Carty
- FB Rocco J. Carzo
- QB Larry Catuzzi
- QB Jim Colbert
- WR Bill Cubit
- RB Omar Cuff
- LB Mondoe Davis
- Richard Dean
- QB Pat Devlin
- LB Leon Dombrowski
- WR Jamin Elliott
- Barry Fetterman
- LS Joe Fortunato
- QB Rich Gannon
- C Gino Gradkowski
- QB Andy Hall
- DB Sidney Haugabrook
- DB Travis Hawkins
- OL Conway Hayman
- Mickey Heinecken
- QB Nolan Henderson
- RB Wes Hills (Note: Hills played for Delaware from 2013–2016 before being declared academically ineligible for the 2017 season. He played for Slippery Rock in 2018.)
- DB Tim Jacobs
- DL Dennis Johnson
- Peter Johnson
- WR Martwain Johnston
- RB Gardy Kahoe
- LB K. C. Keeler
- QB Pat Kehoe
- DT Zach Kerr
- QB Jeff Komlo
- G Mickey Kwiatkowski
- DE Matt Marcorelle
- DB Mike McGlinchey
- DL Chase McGowan
- DT Joe McGrail
- LB Joe McHale
- QB Don Miller
- DL Joe Minucci
- TE Jeff Modesitt
- QB Matt Nagy
- John D. Naylor
- DT Bilal Nichols
- WR Vinny Papale
- TE Ben Patrick
- C Bob Patton
- Joe Purzycki
- Mike Purzycki
- G/LB Jim Quirk
- P David Raymond
- RB Dan Reeder
- Herm Reitzes
- Joseph J. Rothrock
- QB Warren Ruggiero
- DB George Schmitt
- T/LB Herb Slattery
- Tony Storti
- K Jon Striefsky
- S Ivory Sully
- OL Joe Susan
- DE Ronald Talley
- LB Jackson Taylor
- DE Hal Thompson
- RB/WR Brett Veach
- John E. Wallace Jr.
- DE Laith Wallschleger
- DB Anthony Walters
- DL Richard Washington
- DL Blaine Woodson
- LB Paul Worrilow
- WR Joshua Youngblood
- Bill Zwaan

== Future non-conference opponents ==
Announced schedules as of July 15, 2026.

2026	2027	2028	2029	2030	2031	2032	2033
Merrimack (9/3)	LIU (9/2)	at James Madison (9/2)	at Pittsburgh (9/1)	at Western Michigan (9/7)	James Madison (9/13)	Temple (9/2)	at Temple (9/1)
at Vanderbilt (9/12)	at Illinois (9/11)	at Maryland (9/9)	Bucknell (9/8)	at Indiana (9/14)	at Buffalo (9/20)	at James Madison (9/18)	
Coastal Carolina (9/19)	James Madison (9/18)	Morgan State (9/16)	Buffalo (9/15)				
at Virginia (9/26)	at UConn (11/27)	Western Michigan (9/23)	at Coastal Carolina (9/22)				

== College Football Hall of Fame inductees ==
Name	Inducted
Bill Murray	1974
David Nelson	1987
Tubby Raymond	2003
