= 2003 East Tennessee State Buccaneers football team =

American college football season

2003 East Tennessee State Buccaneers football
- Conference: Southern Conference
- Record: 5–7 (2–6 SoCon)
- Head coach: Paul Hamilton (7th season)
- Home stadium: Memorial Center

2003 Southern Conference football standings
	Conf.			Overall
Team	W		L	W		L
No. 3 Wofford $^	8	–	0	12	–	2
Appalachian State	6	–	2	7	–	4
No. 24 Georgia Southern	5	–	3	7	–	4
Furman	4	–	4	6	–	5
The Citadel	4	–	4	6	–	6
Western Carolina	3	–	5	5	–	7
Chattanooga	3	–	5	3	–	9
East Tennessee State	2	–	6	5	–	7
Elon	1	–	7	2	–	10
$ – Conference champion; ^ – NCAA Division I-AA playoff participant; Rankings from The Sports Network I-AA Poll

The 2003 East Tennessee State Buccaneers football team was an American football team that represented East Tennessee State University as a member of the Southern Conference (SoCon) during the 2003 NCAA Division I-AA football season. Led by seventh-year head coach Paul Hamilton, the Buccaneers compiled an overall record of 5–7, with a mark of 2–6 in conference play, and finished eighth in the SoCon.

== Schedule ==
Date	Time	Opponent	Site	Result	Attendance	Source
August 28	7:00 p.m.	at Eastern Michigan*	Rynearson Stadium; Ypsilanti, MI	L 21–28	11,725	
September 4	7:00 p.m.	Concord*	Memorial Center; Johnson City, TN	W 44–0	5,481	
September 11	7:00 p.m.	at Tennessee–Martin*	Graham Stadium; Martin, TN	W 14–7 ^{OT}	3,928	
September 20	2:00 p.m.	at Elon	Rhodes Stadium; Elon, NC	L 0–14	8,353	
September 27	1:00 p.m.	Western Carolina	Memorial Center; Johnson City, TN	L 21–28	4,868	
October 4	3:30 p.m.	at Appalachian State	Kidd Brewer Stadium; Boone, NC	L 7–21	19,421	
October 18	2:00 p.m.	Liberty*	Memorial Center; Johnson City, TN	W 33–23	7,730	
October 25	2:00 p.m.	at No. 20 Furman	Paladin Stadium; Greenville, SC	L 10–30	10,433	
November 1	1:00 p.m.	Georgia Southern	Memorial Center; Johnson City, TN	L 22–34	4,235	
November 8	1:30 p.m.	at No. 5 Wofford	Gibbs Stadium; Spartanburg, SC	L 14–28	8,871	
November 15	1:00 p.m.	Chattanooga	Memorial Center; Johnson City, TN	W 68–7	4,419	
November 22	1:00 p.m.	The Citadel	Memorial Center; Johnson City, TN	W 16–13	5,911	
*Non-conference game; Rankings from The Sports Network Poll released prior to the game; All times are in Eastern time
