= 2003 Appalachian State Mountaineers football team =

American college football season

2003 Appalachian State Mountaineers football
- Conference: Southern Conference
- Record: 7–4 (6–2 SoCon)
- Head coach: Jerry Moore (15th season)
- Home stadium: Kidd Brewer Stadium

2003 Southern Conference football standings
| | Conf. | | | Overall |
| Team | W | | L | W | | L |
|---|---|---|---|---|---|---|
| No. 3 Wofford $^ | 8 | – | 0 | 12 | – | 2 |
| Appalachian State | 6 | – | 2 | 7 | – | 4 |
| No. 24 Georgia Southern | 5 | – | 3 | 7 | – | 4 |
| Furman | 4 | – | 4 | 6 | – | 5 |
| The Citadel | 4 | – | 4 | 6 | – | 6 |
| Western Carolina | 3 | – | 5 | 5 | – | 7 |
| Chattanooga | 3 | – | 5 | 3 | – | 9 |
| East Tennessee State | 2 | – | 6 | 5 | – | 7 |
| Elon | 1 | – | 7 | 2 | – | 10 |
$ – Conference champion; ^ – NCAA Division I-AA playoff participant; Rankings from The Sports Network I-AA Poll

The 2003 Appalachian State Mountaineers football team represented Appalachian State University as a member of the Southern Conference (SoCON) in the 2003 NCAA Division I-AA football season. Led by 15th-year head coach Jerry Moore, the Mountaineers compiled an overall record of 7–4 with a mark of 6–2 in conference play, placing second in the SoCon. The team finished the season with a 26–18 victory over rival Western Carolina in the Battle for the Old Mountain Jug. Home games were played at Kidd Brewer Stadium in Boone, North Carolina.

== Schedule ==
| Date | Opponent | Rank | Site | Result | Attendance | Source |
|---|---|---|---|---|---|---|
| August 30 | at Hawaii* | No. 9 | Aloha Stadium; Halawa, HI | L 17–40 | 42,996 | |
| September 6 | Eastern Kentucky* | No. 11 | Roy Kidd Stadium; Richmond, KY | L 7–35 | 14,400 | |
| September 20 | Morehead State | | Kidd Brewer Stadium; Boone, NC | W 24–21 | 16,811 | |
| September 27 | at The Citadel | | Johnson Hagood Stadium; Charleston, SC | L 21–24 | 13,569 | |
| October 4 | East Tennessee State | | Kidd Brewer Stadium; Boone, NC | W 21–7 | 19,421 | |
| October 11 | No. 5 Furman | | Paladin Stadium; Greenville, SC | W 13–10 | 12,112 | |
| October 18 | at No. 10 Georgia Southern | | Kidd Brewer Stadium; Boone, NC | W 28–21 | 13,879 | |
| October 25 | No. 6 Wofford | | Gibbs Stadium; Spartanburg, SC | L 14–24 | 10,129 | |
| November 1 | Chattanooga | | Kidd Brewer Stadium; Boone, NC | W 47–7 | 8,753 | |
| November 8 | at Elon | | Rhodes Stadium; Elon, NC | W 34–12 | 10,379 | |
| November 15 | Western Carolina | | Kidd Brewer Stadium; Boone, NC (Battle for the Old Mountain Jug) | W 26–18 | 14,443 | |
*Non-conference game; Rankings from The Sports Network Poll released prior to the game
