= 2003 James Madison Dukes football team =

American college football season

2003 James Madison Dukes football
- Conference: Atlantic 10 Conference
- Record: 6–6 (4–5 A-10)
- Head coach: Mickey Matthews (5th season)
- Defensive coordinator: Dick Hopkins (5th season)
- Home stadium: Bridgeforth Stadium

2003 Atlantic 10 Conference football standings
	Conf.			Overall
Team	W		L	W		L
No. 1 Delaware +^	8	–	1	15	–	1
No. 11 UMass +^	8	–	1	10	–	3
No. 20 Northeastern	6	–	3	8	–	4
No. 25 Villanova	5	–	4	7	–	4
Maine	4	–	4	6	–	5
William & Mary	4	–	4	5	–	5
James Madison	4	–	5	6	–	6
New Hampshire	3	–	6	5	–	7
Rhode Island	3	–	6	4	–	8
Hofstra	2	–	6	2	–	10
Richmond	1	–	8	2	–	9
+ – Conference co-champions; ^ – NCAA Division I-AA playoff participant; Rankings from The Sports Network poll

The 2003 James Madison Dukes football team was an American football team that represented James Madison University during the 2003 NCAA Division I-AA football season as a member of the Atlantic 10 Conference. In their fifth year under head coach Mickey Matthews, the team compiled a 6–6 record.

== Schedule ==
Date	Opponent	Site	Result	Attendance	Source
August 30	Liberty*	Bridgeforth Stadium; Harrisonburg, VA	W 48–6	10,872	
September 6	at No. 9 (I-A) Virginia Tech*	Lane Stadium; Blacksburg, VA	L 0–43	65,115	
September 20	Hofstra	Bridgeforth Stadium; Harrisonburg, VA	W 23–20		
September 27	at No. 10 UMass	McGuirk Stadium; Hadley, MA	L 26–31	10,196	
October 4	at No. 3 Villanova	Villanova Stadium; Villanova, PA	L 14–38	6,841	
October 11	Richmond	Bridgeforth Stadium; Harrisonburg, VA (rivalry)	W 34–14	12,470	
October 18	at William & Mary	Zable Stadium; Williamsburg, VA (rivalry)	W 24–17	8,038	
October 25	at Maine	Alfond Stadium; Orono, ME	L 13–20		
November 1	Rhode Island	Bridgeforth Stadium; Harrisonburg, VA	W 39–27	13,885	
November 8	at New Hampshire	Cowell Stadium; Durham, NH	L 17–20	1,815	
November 15	Charleston Southern*	Bridgeforth Stadium; Harrisonburg, VA	W 45–7	7,403	
November 22	Northeastern	Bridgeforth Stadium; Harrisonburg, VA	L 24–41	7,759	
*Non-conference game; Rankings from The Sports Network Poll released prior to the game
