= 2003 Georgia Southern Eagles football team =

American college football season

2003 Georgia Southern Eagles football
- Conference: Southern Conference

Ranking
- Sports Network: No. 24
- Record: 7–4 (5–3 SoCon)
- Head coach: Mike Sewak (2nd season)
- Offensive coordinator: Mitch Ware (2nd season)
- Defensive coordinator: Rusty Russell (7th season)
- Home stadium: Paulson Stadium (Capacity: 18,000)

2003 Southern Conference football standings
| | Conf. | | | Overall |
| Team | W | | L | W | | L |
|---|---|---|---|---|---|---|
| No. 3 Wofford $^ | 8 | – | 0 | 12 | – | 2 |
| Appalachian State | 6 | – | 2 | 7 | – | 4 |
| No. 24 Georgia Southern | 5 | – | 3 | 7 | – | 4 |
| Furman | 4 | – | 4 | 6 | – | 5 |
| The Citadel | 4 | – | 4 | 6 | – | 6 |
| Western Carolina | 3 | – | 5 | 5 | – | 7 |
| Chattanooga | 3 | – | 5 | 3 | – | 9 |
| East Tennessee State | 2 | – | 6 | 5 | – | 7 |
| Elon | 1 | – | 7 | 2 | – | 10 |
$ – Conference champion; ^ – NCAA Division I-AA playoff participant; Rankings from The Sports Network poll

The 2003 Georgia Southern Eagles football team represented the Georgia Southern Eagles of Georgia Southern University during the 2003 NCAA Division I-AA football season. The Eagles played their home games at Paulson Stadium in Statesboro, Georgia. The team was coached by Mike Sewak, in his second year as head coach for the Eagles.

== Schedule ==
| Date | Time | Opponent | Rank | Site | Result | Attendance | Source |
|---|---|---|---|---|---|---|---|
| September 6 | 6:00 pm | Savannah State* | No. 2 | Paulson Stadium; Statesboro, GA | W 35–0 | 19,470 | |
| September 13 | 8:00 pm | at No. 3 McNeese State* | No. 2 | Cowboy Stadium; Lake Charles, LA | L 15–34 | 17,189 | |
| September 20 | 7:00 pm | at No. 25 Wofford | No. 6 | Gibbs Stadium; Spartanburg, SC | L 14–20 | 9,648 | |
| September 27 | 6:00 pm | Chattanooga | No. 16 | Paulson Stadium; Statesboro, GA | W 34–3 | 18,623 | |
| October 4 | 1:00 pm | FIU* | No. 13 | Paulson Stadium; Statesboro, GA | W 37–35 | 10,409 | |
| October 11 | 1:00 pm | Western Carolina | No. 11 | Paulson Stadium; Statesboro, GA | W 31–25 | 15,708 | |
| October 18 | 4:00 pm | at Appalachian State | No. 10 | Kidd Brewer Stadium; Boone, NC (rivalry) | L 21–28 | 13,879 | |
| October 25 | 1:00 pm | The Citadel | No. 19 | Paulson Stadium; Statesboro, GA | L 24–28 | 15,988 | |
| November 1 | 1:00 pm | at East Tennessee State | | Memorial Center; Johnson City, TN | W 34–22 | 4,235 | |
| November 8 | 1:00 pm | No. 18 Furman | | Paulson Stadium; Statesboro, GA | W 29–24 | 14,562 | |
| November 15 | 3:30 pm | at Elon | No. 24 | Rhodes Stadium; Elon, NC | W 37–13 | 2,834 | |
*Non-conference game; Rankings from The Sports Network Poll released prior to the game; All times are in Eastern time
