= 2003 Villanova Wildcats football team =

American college football season

2003 Villanova Wildcats football
- Conference: Atlantic 10 Conference

Ranking
- Sports Network: No. 25
- Record: 7–4 (5–4 A-10)
- Head coach: Andy Talley (19th season)
- Offensive coordinator: Sam Venuto (5th season)
- Offensive scheme: Multiple spread
- Defensive coordinator: Joe Trainer (7th season)
- Base defense: 4–3
- Home stadium: Villanova Stadium

2003 Atlantic 10 Conference football standings
	Conf.			Overall
Team	W		L	W		L
No. 1 Delaware +^	8	–	1	15	–	1
No. 11 UMass +^	8	–	1	10	–	3
No. 20 Northeastern	6	–	3	8	–	4
No. 25 Villanova	5	–	4	7	–	4
Maine	4	–	4	6	–	5
William & Mary	4	–	4	5	–	5
James Madison	4	–	5	6	–	6
New Hampshire	3	–	6	5	–	7
Rhode Island	3	–	6	4	–	8
Hofstra	2	–	6	2	–	10
Richmond	1	–	8	2	–	9
+ – Conference co-champions; ^ – NCAA Division I-AA playoff participant; Rankings from The Sports Network poll

The 2003 Villanova Wildcats football team was an American football team that represented the Villanova University in the Atlantic 10 Conference during the 2003 NCAA Division I-AA football season. In their 19th season under head coach Andy Talley, the Wildcats compiled an 7–4 overall record with a 5–4 mark in conference play. They were ranked number 25 in the polls.

== Schedule ==
Date	Time	Opponent	Rank	Site	TV	Result	Attendance	Source
August 28	7:00 pm	Hampton*	No. 12	Villanova Stadium; Villanova, PA		W 41–6	7,707	
September 6	4:00 pm	at Temple*	No. 9	Lincoln Financial Field; Philadelphia, PA (Mayor's Cup)		W 23–20 ^{2OT}	30,090	
September 13	12:00 pm	at New Hampshire	No. 6	Wildcat Stadium; Durham, NH		W 48–14		
September 27	12:30 pm	No. 4 Northeastern	No. 5	Villanova Stadium; Villanova, PA		W 28–7		
October 4	6:30 pm	James Madison	No. 3	Villanova Stadium; Villanova, PA		W 38–14	6,841	
October 11	12:00 pm	at Rhode Island	No. 3	Meade Stadium; Kingston, RI		W 21–17		
October 25	3:30 pm	No. 5 UMass	No. 2	Villanova Stadium; Villanova, PA	FSNE	L 14–19	9,125	
November 1	1:00 pm	at Richmond	No. 7	University of Richmond Stadium; Richmond, VA		W 42–13	5,152	
November 8	7:00 pm	at Hofstra	No. 7	James M. Shuart Stadium; Hempstead, NY		L 32–34		
November 15	3:00 pm	at Maine	No. 13	Alfond Stadium; Orono, ME		L 10–14		
November 22	4:00 pm	No. 3 Delaware	No. 18	Villanova Stadium; Villanova, PA (rivalry)	CN8	L 17–20	12,253	
*Non-conference game; Rankings from The Sports Network Poll released prior to the game; All times are in Eastern time
