= 2003 New Hampshire Wildcats football team =

American college football season

2003 New Hampshire Wildcats football
- Conference: Atlantic 10 Conference
- Record: 5–7 (3–6 A-10)
- Head coach: Sean McDonnell (5th season)
- Offensive coordinator: Chip Kelly (5th season)
- Home stadium: Cowell Stadium

2003 Atlantic 10 Conference football standings
	Conf.			Overall
Team	W		L	W		L
No. 1 Delaware +^	8	–	1	15	–	1
No. 11 UMass +^	8	–	1	10	–	3
No. 20 Northeastern	6	–	3	8	–	4
No. 25 Villanova	5	–	4	7	–	4
Maine	4	–	4	6	–	5
William & Mary	4	–	4	5	–	5
James Madison	4	–	5	6	–	6
New Hampshire	3	–	6	5	–	7
Rhode Island	3	–	6	4	–	8
Hofstra	2	–	6	2	–	10
Richmond	1	–	8	2	–	9
+ – Conference co-champions; ^ – NCAA Division I-AA playoff participant; Rankings from The Sports Network poll

The 2003 New Hampshire Wildcats football team was an American football team that represented the University of New Hampshire as a member of the Atlantic 10 Conference during the 2003 NCAA Division I-AA football season. In its fifth year under head coach Sean McDonnell, the team compiled a 5–7 record (3–6 against conference opponents) and tied for eighth place out of eleven teams in the Atlantic 10 Conference.

== Schedule ==
Date	Opponent	Site	Result	Attendance	Source
August 30	Central Connecticut*	Cowell Stadium; Durham, NH	W 70–20		
September 6	at Central Michigan*	Kelly/Shorts Stadium; Mount Pleasant, MI	L 33–40		
September 13	No. 6 Villanova	Cowell Stadium; Durham, NH	L 14–48		
September 20	at Rhode Island	Meade Stadium; Kingston, RI	L 40–55		
September 27	Dartmouth*	Cowell Stadium; Durham, NH (rivalry)	W 42–17	3,335	
October 4	at No. 9 UMass	McGuirk Stadium; Hadley, MA (rivalry)	L 30–44	7,085	
October 11	No. 4 Delaware	Cowell Stadium; Durham, NH	L 21–22	4,815	
October 18	at Richmond	University of Richmond Stadium; Richdmond, VA	L 23–35	5,287	
October 25	at Hofstra	James M. Shuart Stadium; Hempstead, NY	W 38–17		
November 8	James Madison	Cowell Stadium; Durham, NH	W 20–17	1,815	
November 15	at William & Mary	Zable Stadium; Williamsburg, VA	L 28–38	4,887	
November 22	No. 23 Maine	Cowell Stadium; Durham, NH (Battle for the Brice–Cowell Musket)	W 47–27		
*Non-conference game; Rankings from The Sports Network Poll released prior to the game
