= Jim Colbert (American football) =

American football player and coach

Biographical details
- Born: c. 1948

Playing career
- 1969–1971: Delaware
- Positions: Quarterback, wide receiver

Coaching career (HC unless noted)
- 1972–1975: Smyrna HS (DE)
- 1976–1979: Davidson (OC)
- 1980–1982: C. W. Post

Head coaching record
- Overall: 15–16 (college); 30–21–1 (high school)

Jim Colbert (born c. 1948) is an American former football player and coach. He served as the head football coach at C. W. Post—now known as LIU Post—in Brookville, New York from 1980 to 1982, compiling a record of 15–16. Colbert attended Neshaminy High School in Langhorne, Pennsylvania and was the starting quarterback at the University of Delaware in 1970 before switching to wide receiver. He was head football coach at Smyrna High School in Smyrna, Delaware from 1972 to 1975, tallying a mark of 30–21–1, before he was hired as the offensive coordinator at Davidson College in 1976.

== Head coaching record ==
=== College ===
Year	Team	Overall	Conference	Standing	Bowl/playoffs
C. W. Post Pioneers (NCAA Division II independent) (1980–1982)
1980	C. W. Post	5–5			
1981	C. W. Post	7–4			
1982	C. W. Post	3–7			
C. W. Post:		15–16			
Total:		15–16			
