= 2003 Furman Paladins football team =

American college football season

2003 Furman Paladins football
- Conference: Southern Conference
- Record: 6–5 (4–4 SoCon)
- Head coach: Bobby Lamb (2nd season)
- Captains: Hindley Brigham; Danny Marshall; Brandon Poole; Lamar Rembert; Keito Whetstone
- Home stadium: Paladin Stadium

2003 Southern Conference football standings
	Conf.			Overall
Team	W		L	W		L
No. 3 Wofford $^	8	–	0	12	–	2
Appalachian State	6	–	2	7	–	4
No. 24 Georgia Southern	5	–	3	7	–	4
Furman	4	–	4	6	–	5
The Citadel	4	–	4	6	–	6
Western Carolina	3	–	5	5	–	7
Chattanooga	3	–	5	3	–	9
East Tennessee State	2	–	6	5	–	7
Elon	1	–	7	2	–	10
$ – Conference champion; ^ – NCAA Division I-AA playoff participant; Rankings from The Sports Network I-AA Poll

The 2003 Furman Paladins football team was an American football team that represented Furman University as a member of the Southern Conference (SoCon) during the 2003 NCAA Division I-AA football season. In their first year under head coach Bobby Lamb, the Paladins compiled an overall record of 6–5 with a conference mark of 4–4, finishing tied for fourth in the SoCon.

== Schedule ==
Date	Opponent	Rank	Site	Result	Attendance	Source
August 30	Elon	No. 8	Paladin Stadium; Greenville, SC	W 24–7	9,174	
September 6	at Clemson*	No. 8	Memorial Stadium; Clemson, SC	L 17–28	71,477	
September 20	Richmond*	No. 9	Paladin Stadium; Greenville, SC	W 31–17	12,452	
September 27	Gardner–Webb*	No. 8	Paladin Stadium; Greenville, SC	W 45–0	9,528	
October 4	at Western Carolina	No. 6	Bob Waters Field at E. J. Whitmire Stadium; Cullowhee, NC	W 19–13	10,557	
October 11	Appalachian State	No. 5	Paladin Stadium; Greenville, SC	L 10–13	12,112	
October 18	at The Citadel	No. 13	Johnson Hagood Stadium; Charleston, SC (rivalry)	L 9–10	17,041	
October 25	East Tennessee State	No. 20	Paladin Stadium; Greenville, SC	W 30–10	10,433	
November 8	at Georgia Southern	No. 18	Paulson Stadium; Statesboro, GA	L 24–29	14,562	
November 15	No. 4 Wofford		Paladin Stadium; Greenville, SC (rivalry)	L 6–7	12,745	
November 22	at Chattanooga		Finley Stadium; Chattanooga, TN	W 63–12	5,044	
*Non-conference game; Rankings from The Sports Network Poll released prior to the game
