= 2003 Maine Black Bears football team =

American college football season

2003 Maine Black Bears football
- Conference: Atlantic 10 Conference
- Record: 7–5 (5–4 A-10)
- Head coach: Jack Cosgrove (11th season)
- Offensive coordinator: Bobby Wilder (4th season)
- Defensive coordinator: Rich Nagy (3rd season)
- Captains: Dennis Dottin-Carter; Michael Zyskowski
- Home stadium: Alfond Stadium

2003 Atlantic 10 Conference football standings
	Conf.			Overall
Team	W		L	W		L
No. 1 Delaware +^	8	–	1	15	–	1
No. 11 UMass +^	8	–	1	10	–	3
No. 20 Northeastern	6	–	3	8	–	4
No. 25 Villanova	5	–	4	7	–	4
Maine	4	–	4	6	–	5
William & Mary	4	–	4	5	–	5
James Madison	4	–	5	6	–	6
New Hampshire	3	–	6	5	–	7
Rhode Island	3	–	6	4	–	8
Hofstra	2	–	6	2	–	10
Richmond	1	–	8	2	–	9
+ – Conference co-champions; ^ – NCAA Division I-AA playoff participant; Rankings from The Sports Network poll

The 2003 Maine Black Bears football team was an American football team that represented the University of Maine as a member of the Atlantic 10 Conference during the 2003 NCAA Division I-AA football season. In their 11th season under head coach Jack Cosgrove, the Black Bears compiled a 7–5 record (5–4 against conference opponents) and tied for fifth place in the conference. Dennis Dottin-Carter and Michael Zyskowski were the team captains.

== Schedule ==
Date	Opponent	Rank	Site	Result	Attendance	Source
August 30	No. 4 Montana*	No. 16	Alfond Stadium; Orono, ME	L 20–30	9,345	
September 6	at Hofstra	No. 20	James M. Shuart Stadium; Hempstead, NY	W 44–21		
September 13	FIU*	No. 18	Alford Stadium; Orono, ME	W 24–14	6,227	
September 20	No. 12 UMass	No. 16	Alfond Stadium; Orono, ME	L 16–24	7,316	
September 27	at William & Mary	No. 24		No contest		
October 4	Richmond	No. 23	Alfond Stadium; Orono, ME	W 20–10	6,839	
October 18	at Northeastern	No. 20	Parsons Field; Brookline, MA	L 14–20		
October 25	James Madison		Alfond Stadium; Orono, ME	W 20–13		
November 1	at No. 2 Delaware		Delaware Stadium; Newark, DE	L 21–24 ^{OT}	22,057	
November 8	at Morgan State*		Hughes Stadium; Baltimore, MD	W 77–24		
November 15	No. 13 Villanova		Alfond Stadium; Orono, ME	W 14–10		
November 22	at New Hampshire	No. 23	Cowell Stadium; Durham, NH (Battle for the Brice–Cowell Musket)	L 27–47		
*Non-conference game; Rankings from The Sports Network Poll released prior to the game
