= K. C. Keeler =

American football player and coach (born 1959)

Current position
- Title: Head coach
- Team: Temple
- Conference: American
- Record: 7–16

Biographical details
- Born: July 26, 1959 (age 67); Emmaus, Pennsylvania, U.S.

Playing career
- 1978–1980: Delaware
- Position: Linebacker

Coaching career (HC unless noted)
- 1981–1982: Amherst (assistant)
- 1986–1992: Rowan (assistant)
- 1993–2001: Rowan
- 2002–2012: Delaware
- 2014–2024: Sam Houston State
- 2025–present: Temple

Head coaching record
- Overall: 278–128–1
- Tournaments: 21–7 (NCAA D-III playoffs); 25–7 (NCAA D-I-AA/FCS playoffs)

Accomplishments and honors

Championships
- 2 NCAA Division I-AA/FCS (2003, 2021); 4 NJAC (1993, 1995, 1997, 2001); 2 A-10 (2003–2004); 1 CAA (2010); 3 Southland (2014, 2016, 2020); 1 WAC (2021)

Awards
- Eddie Robinson Award (2016); AFCA Coach of the Year Award (2010); Liberty Mutual Coach of the Year Award (2010); All-American Football Foundation Frank Leahy Coach of the Year (2003); All-American Football Foundation Johnny Vaught Head Coach Award (2007); Field Turf FCS Coach of the Year (2010); Maxwell Club Coach of the Year (2003, 2007, 2010)

Kurt Charles Keeler (born July 26, 1959) is an American football coach and former player. He is the head football coach at Temple University. Keeler was the head coach at Sam Houston State University from 2014 to 2024; the University of Delaware, his alma mater, from 2002 to 2012; and at Rowan University from 1993 to 2001.

Keeler is the all-time winningest coach in NCAA Division I Football Championship Subdivision playoff history and, after winning the national championship with Delaware in 2003 and Sam Houston in 2020, the only coach in FCS history to win a national championship at two institutions. However, the 2020 season was impacted by Covid and was an abbreviated season and playoff. In 2019, an ESPN Blue Ribbon Panel selected Keeler as one of the 150 greatest coaches in college football history.

== Playing career ==
=== High school and college ===
Keeler played high school football at Emmaus High School in Emmaus, Pennsylvania. He was chosen to play in the 1977 Pennsylvania Big 33 All-Star game. He went on to play collegiate football at the University of Delaware, where he was a linebacker from 1978 to 1980 under coach Tubby Raymond. He was a member of the 1979 Division II National Championship squad.

=== NFL and USFL ===
In 1982, Keeler signed a free agent contract with the Philadelphia Eagles of the National Football League. Keeler was resigned by the Eagles in 1983 after being a late cut by the Philadelphia Stars of the USFL. He was one of the last players cut by the Eagles in 1982 and 1983. Keeler was also a member of the 1984 Jacksonville Bulls of the United States Football League during their training camp.

== Coaching career ==
=== Amherst and Rowan ===
Keeler began his coaching career as an assistant at Amherst College in Amherst, Massachusetts, in 1981, and then at Rowan University in Glassboro, New Jersey, in 1986. He became Rowan's head coach for the 1993 season, ending his tenure in 2001 with an 88–21–1 (.804) record and seven NCAA Division III playoff appearances. He was 0–5 in NCAA Division III Football Championship Stagg Bowls at Rowan.

=== Delaware ===
After Raymond retired in 2002, Keeler was named the fourth head coach of the University of Delaware in the program's 62-year history. He immediately brought a new offensive philosophy to the team, replacing its famed and historic Winged-T formation with a no-huddle, spread offense. Under Keeler, Delaware won its first national championship since 1979 and its first Division I-AA title (in 2003) with a 15–1 record and a 149–23 total score in the four-game playoff series.

Like his predecessor, Keeler became a popular figure in Delaware. He was named "Delawarean of the Year" in 2004 by Delaware Today magazine and was listed as one of the top college football recruiters in the nation by American Football Monthly magazine. The Wilmington News Journal reported that Keeler was forced to hire an agent after the 2003 championship to help manage speaking engagements, guest appearances and private functions. His trademark sunglasses (which he also wore during night games) and wireless headgear were emulated on bobbleheads sold at games and local Newark businesses.

Keeler often challenged criticism that I-AA/FCS programs are of lesser caliber than I-A. "We're the LSU; we're the Georgia, the Florida of Division I-AA," Keeler said in a 2004 interview with American Football Monthly. "We have every resource. There's some people who have better resources than we do, but in general, the college campus we have is in one of the greatest college towns in America, and the academics ... we led the nation last year in out-of-state applications, more than Michigan or Texas. But that's what this school has become. Everybody wants to come to school here."

On June 19, 2008, Keeler signed a 10-year contract extension, which would have had him coaching the Blue Hens through the 2017 season. However, Keeler was fired following a disappointing 2012 season, in which his team went 5–6.

In 2024, Delaware announced that it will be inducting Keeler into the Delaware Athletic Hall of Fame, alongside UD 2002–2003 quarterback Andy Hall.

=== Sam Houston ===
On January 23, 2014, Keeler was named head coach of Sam Houston University. In 2014, Sam Houston State went 11–5, as Keeler helped the Bearkats return to the FCS playoffs. They won three playoff games, including a win over Keeler's old CAA rival Villanova, before losing in the semifinals. The Bearkats went 8–3 in 2015 and once again advanced to the playoff semifinals.

In 2016, Keeler led Sam Houston State to its first undefeated regular season since 2011. Led by Walter Payton Award winner Jeremiah Briscoe, Sam Houston State won the Southland Conference and made an FCS playoffs run before being blown out by James Madison in the quarterfinals. Keeler was named Coach of the Year.

In 2017, Keeler led Sam Houston State to the playoffs for the fourth straight year, once again advancing to the semifinals. This was his third appearance in the semifinals with Sam Houston, although he was once again stopped before the title game, losing to North Dakota State.

Keeler led the 2020 Bearkats to a 10–0 season, culminating with a 23–21 win over the South Dakota State Jackrabbits in the 2021 NCAA Division I Football Championship Game. It was the first NCAA football championship in program history; the Bearkats had shared the 1964 NAIA football championship with Concordia College of Moorhead, Minnesota.

Through 2022, Keeler had won three Southland Conference championships, a WAC championship, 14 FCS playoff games and a national title through eight seasons at Sam Houston. With the Bearkats, Keeler became the all-time FCS playoffs wins leader and the only coach to win an FCS title with two schools.

=== Temple ===
Keeler was named the head coach at Temple University following the 2024 regular season, replacing Stan Drayton.

== Commentating career ==
While out of coaching in 2013, Keeler worked as a content producer for NFL Films' NFL Matchup featuring Ron Jaworski, Merril Hoge, and Sal Paolantonio, and produced by Greg Cosell, and as a color commentator for ESPN.

== Head coaching record ==
Year	Team	Overall	Conference	Standing	Bowl/playoffs	TSN/STATS^{#}	Coaches^{°}
Rowan Profs (New Jersey Athletic Conference) (1993–2001)
1993	Rowan	11–2	5–0	1st	L NCAA Division III Championship		
1994	Rowan	6–3	3–2	T–3rd			
1995	Rowan	10–3–1	5–0	1st	L NCAA Division III Championship		
1996	Rowan	10–3	4–1	2nd	L NCAA Division III Championship		
1997	Rowan	11–1	5–0	1st	L NCAA Division III Semifinal		
1998	Rowan	10–3	4–1	2nd	L NCAA Division III Championship		
1999	Rowan	12–2	4–1	2nd	L NCAA Division III Championship		
2000	Rowan	7–2	5–1	2nd			
2001	Rowan	11–2	5–1	T–1st	L NCAA Division III Semifinal		
Rowan:		88–21–1	38–7				
Delaware Fightin' Blue Hens (Atlantic 10 Conference) (2002–2006)
2002	Delaware	6–6	4–5	T–6th			
2003	Delaware	15–1	8–1	T–1st	W NCAA Division I-AA Championship	1	1
2004	Delaware	9–4	7–1	T–1st	L NCAA Division I-AA Quarterfinal	7	
2005	Delaware	6–5	3–5	3rd (South)			
2006	Delaware	5–6	4–5	T–4th (South)			
Delaware Fightin' Blue Hens (CAA Football) (2007–2012)
2007	Delaware	11–4	5–3	T–3rd (South)	L NCAA Division I Championship	2	2
2008	Delaware	4–8	2–6	5th (South)			
2009	Delaware	6–5	4–4	T–4th (South)			
2010	Delaware	12–3	6–2	T–1st	L NCAA Division I Championship	2	2
2011	Delaware	7–4	5–3	T–5th		17	20
2012	Delaware	5–6	2–6	8th			
Delaware:		86–52	49–41				
Sam Houston State Bearkats (Southland Conference) (2014–2020)
2014	Sam Houston State	11–5	7–1	T–1st	L NCAA Division I Semifinal	6	6
2015	Sam Houston State	11–4	7–2	2nd	L NCAA Division I Semifinal	3	4
2016	Sam Houston State	12–1	9–0	1st	L NCAA Division I Quarterfinal	5	5
2017	Sam Houston State	12–2	8–1	2nd	L NCAA Division I Semifinal	4	3
2018	Sam Houston State	6–5	5–4	T–4th			
2019	Sam Houston State	7–5	6–3	T–3rd			
2020–21	Sam Houston State	10–0	6–0	1st	W NCAA Division I Championship	1	1
Sam Houston Bearkats (Western Athletic Conference) (2021–2022)
2021	Sam Houston	11–1	6–0	1st	L NCAA Division I Quarterfinal	5	4
2022	Sam Houston	5–4	3–2				
Sam Houston Bearkats (Conference USA) (2023–2024)
2023	Sam Houston	3–9	2–6	T–6th			
2024	Sam Houston	9–3	6–2	T–2nd	New Orleans (Note: Keeler left for Temple prior to Sam Houston's bowl game)		
Sam Houston State / Sam Houston:		97–39	65–21				
Temple Owls (American Conference) (2025–present)
2025	Temple	5–7	3–5	T–9th			
2026	Temple	2–9	1–6				
Temple:		7–16	4–11				
Total:		278–128–1					
National championship Conference title Conference division title or championship game berth
^{#}Rankings from final Sports Network Poll.

== See also ==
- List of college football career coaching wins leaders
