= 2003 Elon Phoenix football team =

American college football season

2003 Elon Phoenix football
- Conference: Southern Conference
- Record: 2–10 (1–7 SoCon)
- Head coach: Al Seagraves (8th season)
- Home stadium: Rhodes Stadium

2003 Southern Conference football standings
	Conf.			Overall
Team	W		L	W		L
No. 3 Wofford $^	8	–	0	12	–	2
Appalachian State	6	–	2	7	–	4
No. 24 Georgia Southern	5	–	3	7	–	4
Furman	4	–	4	6	–	5
The Citadel	4	–	4	6	–	6
Western Carolina	3	–	5	5	–	7
Chattanooga	3	–	5	3	–	9
East Tennessee State	2	–	6	5	–	7
Elon	1	–	7	2	–	10
$ – Conference champion; ^ – NCAA Division I-AA playoff participant; Rankings from The Sports Network I-AA Poll

The 2003 Elon Phoenix football team was an American football team that represented Elon University as a member of the Southern Conference (SoCon) during the 2003 NCAA Division I-AA football season. Led by eighth-year head coach Al Seagraves, the Phoenix compiled an overall record of 2–10, with a mark of 1–7 in conference play, and finished ninth in the SoCon.

== Schedule ==
Date	Time	Opponent	Site	Result	Attendance	Source
August 30	7:00 p.m.	at No. 8 Furman	Paladin Stadium; Greenville, SC	L 7–24	9,174	
September 6	6:00 p.m.	Tusculum*	Rhodes Stadium; Elon, NC	L 3–17	5,481	
September 13	7:00 p.m.	at Hofstra*	James M. Shuart Stadium; Hempstead, NY	W 25–23	2,268	
September 20	2:00 p.m.	East Tennessee State	Rhodes Stadium; Elon, NC	W 14–0	8,353	
September 27	6:00 p.m.	North Carolina A&T*	Rhodes Stadium; Elon, NC	L 14–29	10,536	
October 4	2:00 p.m.	at The Citadel	Johnson Hagood Stadium; Charleston, SC	L 7–31	17,102	
October 11	1:30 p.m.	at No. 8 Wofford	Gibbs Stadium; Spartanburg, SC	L 7–45	8,182	
October 18	2:00 p.m.	Chattanooga	Rhodes Stadium; Elon, NC	L 7–24	3,271	
October 25	1:00 p.m.	at Towson*	Johnny Unitas Stadium; Towson, MD	L 7–24	3,586	
November 1	2:00 p.m.	at Western Carolina	E. J. Whitmire Stadium; Cullowhee, NC	L 3–26	7,994	
November 8	2:00 p.m.	Appalachian State	Rhodes Stadium; Elon, NC	L 12–34	10,379	
November 15	3:30 p.m.	No. 24 Georgia Southern	Rhodes Stadium; Elon, NC	L 13–37	2,834	
*Non-conference game; Rankings from The Sports Network Poll released prior to the game; All times are in Eastern time
