= 2003 Rhode Island Rams football team =

American college football season

2003 Rhode Island Rams football
- Conference: Atlantic 10 Conference
- Record: 4–8 (3–6 A-10)
- Head coach: Tim Stowers (4th season)
- Offensive coordinator: Harold Nichols (4th season)
- Home stadium: Meade Stadium

2003 Atlantic 10 Conference football standings
	Conf.			Overall
Team	W		L	W		L
No. 1 Delaware +^	8	–	1	15	–	1
No. 11 UMass +^	8	–	1	10	–	3
No. 20 Northeastern	6	–	3	8	–	4
No. 25 Villanova	5	–	4	7	–	4
Maine	4	–	4	6	–	5
William & Mary	4	–	4	5	–	5
James Madison	4	–	5	6	–	6
New Hampshire	3	–	6	5	–	7
Rhode Island	3	–	6	4	–	8
Hofstra	2	–	6	2	–	10
Richmond	1	–	8	2	–	9
+ – Conference co-champions; ^ – NCAA Division I-AA playoff participant; Rankings from The Sports Network poll

The 2003 Rhode Island Rams football team was an American football team that represented the University of Rhode Island in the Atlantic 10 Conference during the 2003 NCAA Division I-AA football season. In their fourth season under head coach Tim Stowers, the Rams compiled a 4–8 record (3–6 against conference opponents) and tied for eighth place in the conference.

== Schedule ==
Date	Opponent	Site	Result	Attendance	Source
September 6	No. 13 Fordham*	Meade Stadium; Kingston, RI	L 28–63	4,311	
September 13	No. 5 Northeastern	Meade Stadium; Kingston, RI	L 39–42	2,970	
September 20	New Hampshire	Meade Stadium; Kingston, RI	W 55–40	3,261	
September 27	at Richmond	UR Stadium; Richmond, VA	W 17–13	8,270	
October 4	at Brown*	Brown Stadium; Providence, RI (rivalry)	W 27–9	5,728	
October 11	No. 3 Villanova^{†}	Meade Stadium; Kingston, RI	L 17–21	3,623	
October 18	at No. 4 Delaware	Delaware Stadium; Newark, DE	L 10–55	20,795	
October 25	William & Mary	Meade Stadium; Kingston, RI	L 24–37	4,098	
November 1	at James Madison	Bridgeforth Stadium; Harrisonburg, VA	L 27–39	13,885	
November 8	at Cincinnati*	Nippert Stadium; Cincinnati, OH	L 24–31	14,066	
November 15	Hofstra	Meade Stadium; Kingston, RI	W 24–0	2,523	
November 22	at No. 7 UMass	McGuirk Stadium; Hadley, MA	L 17–31	7,087	
*Non-conference game; ^{†}Homecoming; Rankings from The Sports Network Poll released prior to the game
