= 2003 Wofford Terriers football team =

American college football season

2003 Wofford Terriers football

SoCon champion

NCAA Division I-AA Semifinal, L 9–24 vs. Delaware
- Conference: Southern Conference

Ranking
- Sports Network: No. 3
- Record: 12–2 (8–0 SoCon)
- Head coach: Mike Ayers (16th season)
- Home stadium: Gibbs Stadium

2003 Southern Conference football standings
	Conf.			Overall
Team	W		L	W		L
No. 3 Wofford $^	8	–	0	12	–	2
Appalachian State	6	–	2	7	–	4
No. 24 Georgia Southern	5	–	3	7	–	4
Furman	4	–	4	6	–	5
The Citadel	4	–	4	6	–	6
Western Carolina	3	–	5	5	–	7
Chattanooga	3	–	5	3	–	9
East Tennessee State	2	–	6	5	–	7
Elon	1	–	7	2	–	10
$ – Conference champion; ^ – NCAA Division I-AA playoff participant; Rankings from The Sports Network poll

The 2003 Wofford Terriers football team was an American football team that represented Wofford College as a member of the Southern Conference (SoCon) during the 2003 NCAA Division I-AA football season. In their 16th year under head coachMike Ayers, the Terriers compiled an overall record of 12–2 with a conference mark of 8–0, and finished as SoCon champion. Wofford advanced to the NCAA Division I-AA Football Championship playoffs, where they defeated North Carolina A&T and Western Kentucky before they lost at Delaware in the semifinals.

== Schedule ==
Date	Time	Opponent	Rank	Site	TV	Result	Attendance	Source
August 30	2:00 p.m.	at Air Force*		Falcon Stadium; Colorado Springs, CO		L 0–49	40,111	
September 6	7:00 p.m.	South Carolina State*		Gibbs Stadium; Spartanburg, SC		W 35–13	11,486	
September 20	7:00 p.m.	No. 6 Georgia Southern	No. 25	Gibbs Stadium; Spartanburg, SC		W 20–14	9,648	
September 27	7:00 p.m.	Catawba*	No. 15	Gibbs Stadium; Spartanburg, SC		W 28–3	7,032	
October 4	4:00 p.m.	at Chattanooga	No. 12	Finley Stadium; Chattanooga, TN		W 42–14	7,409	
October 11	1:30 p.m.	Elon	No. 8	Gibbs Stadium; Spartanburg, SC		W 45–7	8,182	
October 18	2:00 p.m.	at Western Carolina	No. 8	Bob Waters Field at E. J. Whitmire Stadium; Cullowhee, NC		W 38–6	11,021	
October 25	12:00 p.m.	Appalachian State	No. 6	Gibbs Stadium; Spartanburg, SC		W 24–14	10,129	
November 1	2:00 p.m.	at No. 25 The Citadel	No. 5	Johnson Hagood Stadium; Charleston, SC (rivalry)		W 42–16	20,863	
November 8	1:30 p.m.	East Tennessee State	No. 5	Gibbs Stadium; Spartanburg, SC		W 28–14	8,871	
November 15	3:30 p.m.	at Furman	No. 4	Paladin Stadium; Greenville, SC (rivalry)		W 7–6	12,745	
November 29	12:30 p.m.	No. 18 North Carolina A&T*	No. 2	Gibbs Stadium; Spartanburg, SC (NCAA Division I-AA First Round)		W 31–10	10,500	
December 6	4:00 p.m.	No. 9 Western Kentucky*	No. 2	Gibbs Stadium; Spartanburg, SC (NCAA Division I-AA Quarterfinal)		W 34–17	7,500	
December 13	1:00 p.m.	at No. 3 Delaware*	No. 2	Delaware Stadium; Newark, DE (NCAA Division I-AA Semifinal)	ESPN2	L 9–24	14,351	
*Non-conference game; Rankings from The Sports Network Poll released prior to the game; All times are in Eastern time
