= Gwaine Mathews =

American football coach (born 1966)

Biographical details
- Born: February 14, 1966 (age 60); New Orleans, Louisiana, U.S.
- Education: Delta State University (1988)

Playing career
- 1984–1987: Delta State
- 1988: Winnipeg Blue Bombers
- Positions: Running back, cornerback

Coaching career (HC unless noted)
- 1989–1992: Delta State (GA)
- 1993–1995: Delta State (DB)
- 1996–1998: De La Salle HS (LA)
- 1999–2001: Delta State (DC)
- 2002: North Alabama (DC)
- 2003–2004: Chattanooga (DC/LB)
- 2005–2010: Arkansas–Monticello

Head coaching record
- Overall: 22–44 (college)

Gwaine Mathews (often misspelled as Matthews; born February 14, 1966) is an American former college football coach. He was the head football coach for University of Arkansas at Monticello from 2005 to 2010. He also was the head football coach for De La Salle High School from 1996 to 1998. He previously coached for Delta State, North Alabama, and Chattanooga. He played college football for Delta State as a running back and cornerback and professionally for the Winnipeg Blue Bombers of the Canadian Football League (CFL).

== Head coaching record ==
=== College ===
Year	Team	Overall	Conference	Standing	Bowl/playoffs
Arkansas–Monticello Boll Weevils (Gulf South Conference) (2005–2010)
2005	Arkansas–Monticello	1–10	1–8	11th	
2006	Arkansas–Monticello	1–10	1–7	T–8th	
2007	Arkansas–Monticello	4–7	3–5	T–6th	
2008	Arkansas–Monticello	7–4	5–3	T–4th	
2009	Arkansas–Monticello	5–6	4–4	T–5th	
2010	Arkansas–Monticello	4–7	3–5	8th	
Arkansas–Monticello:		22–44	17–32		
Total:		22–44			
