= 2003 UMass Minutemen football team =

American college football season

2003 UMass Minutemen football

A10 co-champion

NCAA Division I-AA First Round, L 7–19 vs. Colgate
- Conference: Atlantic 10 Conference

Ranking
- Sports Network: No. 11
- Record: 10–3 (8–1 A-10)
- Head coach: Mark Whipple (6th season)
- Offensive scheme: Pro-style
- Defensive coordinator: Neil McGrath (4th season)
- Base defense: 4–3
- Home stadium: Warren McGuirk Alumni Stadium

2003 Atlantic 10 Conference football standings
	Conf.			Overall
Team	W		L	W		L
No. 1 Delaware +^	8	–	1	15	–	1
No. 11 UMass +^	8	–	1	10	–	3
No. 20 Northeastern	6	–	3	8	–	4
No. 25 Villanova	5	–	4	7	–	4
Maine	4	–	4	6	–	5
William & Mary	4	–	4	5	–	5
James Madison	4	–	5	6	–	6
New Hampshire	3	–	6	5	–	7
Rhode Island	3	–	6	4	–	8
Hofstra	2	–	6	2	–	10
Richmond	1	–	8	2	–	9
+ – Conference co-champions; ^ – NCAA Division I-AA playoff participant; Rankings from The Sports Network poll

The 2003 UMass Minutemen football team represented the University of Massachusetts Amherst in the 2003 NCAA Division I-AA football season as a member of the Atlantic 10 Conference (A-10). The team was coached by Mark Whipple and played its home games at Warren McGuirk Alumni Stadium in Hadley, Massachusetts. The 2003 season was Whipple's last with UMass. He left to take the position of quarterbacks coach with the NFL's Pittsburgh Steelers after the season. It was a successful year for Whipple and the Minutemen as they returned to the NCAA Division I-AA playoffs for the first time since 1999 by virtue of winning the A-10 Conference championship. UMass finished the season with a record of 10–3 overall and 8–1 in conference play.

== Schedule ==
Date	Time	Opponent	Rank	Site	TV	Result	Attendance	Source
September 6	1:00 p.m.	Central Connecticut State*		McGuirk Stadium; Hadley, MA		W 51–7	8,360	
September 13	1:00 p.m.	at No. 7 (I-A) Kansas State*	No. 10	KSU Stadium; Manhattan, KS		L 7–38	46,102	
September 20	6:00 p.m.	at No. 16 Maine	No. 12	Alfond Stadium; Orono, ME		W 24–16	7,316	
September 27	1:00 p.m.	James Madison	No. 10	McGuirk Stadium; Hadley, MA		W 31–26	10,196	
October 4	1:00 p.m.	New Hampshire	No. 9	McGuirk Stadium; Hadley, MA (rivalry)		W 44–30	7,085	
October 11	1:00 p.m.	at William & Mary	No. 7	Zable Stadium; Williamsburg, VA		W 24–14	4,868	
October 18	12:30 p.m.	Hofstra*^{†}	No. 6	McGuirk Stadium; Hadley, MA	CN8	W 27–22	7,323	
October 25	3:30 p.m.	at No. 2 Villanova	No. 5	Villanova Stadium; Villanova, PA	FSNE	W 19–14	9,125	
November 1	12:30 p.m.	Northeastern	No. 4	McGuirk Stadium; Hadley, MA	CSTV	W 28–24	7,106	
November 8	12:00 p.m.	Richmond	No. 4	McGuirk Stadium; Hadley, MA		W 30–17	6,167	
November 15	12:15 p.m.	at No. 6 Delaware	No. 3	Delaware Stadium; Newark, DE	FSNE	L 45–51 ^{3OT}	21,804	
November 22	12:00 p.m.	Rhode Island	No. 7	McGuirk Stadium; Hadley, MA		W 31–17	7,087	
November 29	12:45 p.m.	at No. 6 Colgate*	No. 5	Andy Kerr Stadium; Hamilton, NY (NCAA Division I-AA First Round)		L 7–19	4,197	
*Non-conference game; ^{†}Homecoming; Rankings from The Sports Network Poll released prior to the game; All times are in Eastern time
