= Mondoe Davis =

American gridiron football player (born 1982)

Profile
- Position: Linebacker

Personal information
- Born: March 19, 1982 (age 44); Newport News, Virginia, U.S.
- Listed height: 6 ft 1 in (1.85 m)
- Listed weight: 230 lb (104 kg)

Career information
- College: Delaware
- NFL draft: 2005: undrafted

Career history
- New York Jets (2005); Montreal Alouettes (2006–2007)

Awards and highlights
- First-team All-Atlantic 10 Conference honors (2004); First-team All-Eastern College Athletic Conference honors (2004); Second-team All-Atlantic 10 Conference honors (2003)

Career CFL statistics
- Tackles: 2

Mondoe Davis (born March 19, 1982) is a former gridiron football linebacker who played for one season in the Canadian Football League (CFL). After playing college football for the Delaware Fightin' Blue Hens, he spent two offseasons with the New York Jets of the National Football League (NFL). He played for the Montreal Alouettes in 2007.

== Early life ==
Davis was raised by his very involved, supportive parents Cervantes and Brenda. Dad was a retired military sergeant and his mother worked as a maximum security prison officer for years. Mondoe was raised with his twin brothers Marquez and Maguel Davis, whom all were heavily involved in football. Davis attended Woodside High School in Newport News, Virginia. Mondoe also became a junior Olympian in wrestling at this school as well. He twice earned All-Peninsula District honors. All three boys received full athletic football scholarships for college.

== College career ==
Davis played college football for the University of Delaware Fightin' Blue Hens. He earned the Spring Practice Most Improved Award in 2001, and second-team All-Atlantic 10 Conference honors in 2003. In his senior year, he earned first-team All-Atlantic 10, All-Eastern College Athletic Conference honors, and Outstanding Senior Defensive Player Award. He tied the school record for most forced fumbles in a career with eight.

== Professional career ==
Davis signed with the New York Jets on April 26, 2005, after going undrafted in the 2005 NFL draft. He tore his anterior cruciate ligament (ACL) in a preseason game on August 19, ending his season. After spending the 2006 offseason with the Jets, he was waived on August 27, 2006.

Davis signed with the Montreal Alouettes' practice roster in September 2006. but was released on October 11. He was re-signed to the active roster on May 29, 2007, but was released on June 22, 2007, during training camp, and was re-signed again on August 20, 2007. He made his professional debut in a game against the BC Lions on August 30, 2007. He was released again on September 5, 2007.

== Personal life ==
Mondoe married his college sweetheart Lisa D. Kennedy on May 14, 2006. Today they live in Fort Worth, TX with their 11 biological children. Davis was the campus pastor of Gateway Church's North Fort Worth campus. It was considered to be one of the largest satellite campuses in the nation. In February 2023, Mondoe parted ways with Gateway amicably and became the founder of Inspiring with Purpose. He continues to focus on his passion of producing content as an author, speaker, and coach. Davis works with many school districts throughout the country delivering programs specific to athletes that will one day transition out of athletics. Mondoe is currently impacting the world internationally and nationally with a message of living life on purpose for purpose.
