= 2003 NCAA Division I-AA football season =

American college football season

2003 NCAA Division I-AA season

Regular season
- Number of teams: 121
- Duration: August–November
- Payton Award: Jamaal Branch (RB, Colgate)
- Buchanan Award: Jared Allen (DE, Idaho State)

Playoff
- Duration: November 29–December 19
- Championship date: December 19, 2003
- Championship site: Finley Stadium; Chattanooga, Tennessee
- Champion: Delaware

NCAA Division I-AA football seasons
- «2002 2004»

The 2003 NCAA Division I-AA football season, part of college football in the United States organized by the National Collegiate Athletic Association at the Division I-AA level, began in August 2003, and concluded with the 2003 NCAA Division I-AA Football Championship Game on December 19, 2003, at Finley Stadium in Chattanooga, Tennessee. The Delaware Fightin' Blue Hens won their first I-AA championship, defeating the Colgate Raiders by a final score of 40−0.

== Conference changes and new programs ==
School	2002 Conference	2003 Conference
Canisius	MAAC	Dropped Program
Coastal Carolina	New Program	Big South
Elon	Big South	Southern
Fairfield	MAAC	Dropped Program
Jacksonville State	Southland	Ohio Valley
Morris Brown	I-AA Independent	Dropped Program
St. John's (NY)	MAAC	Dropped Program
Samford	I-AA Independent	Ohio Valley
Southeastern Louisiana	Revived Program	I-AA Independent
VMI	Southern	Big South

== Conference standings ==
2003 Atlantic 10 Conference football standings
	Conf.			Overall
Team	W		L	W		L
No. 1 Delaware +^	8	–	1	15	–	1
No. 11 UMass +^	8	–	1	10	–	3
No. 20 Northeastern	6	–	3	8	–	4
No. 25 Villanova	5	–	4	7	–	4
Maine	4	–	4	6	–	5
William & Mary	4	–	4	5	–	5
James Madison	4	–	5	6	–	6
New Hampshire	3	–	6	5	–	7
Rhode Island	3	–	6	4	–	8
Hofstra	2	–	6	2	–	10
Richmond	1	–	8	2	–	9
+ – Conference co-champions; ^ – NCAA Division I-AA playoff participant; Rankings from The Sports Network poll

2003 Big Sky Conference football standings
	Conf.			Overall
Team	W		L	W		L
No. 14 Montana +^	5	–	2	9	–	4
No. 10 Northern Arizona +^	5	–	2	9	–	4
No. 21 Montana State +^	5	–	2	7	–	6
No. 22 Idaho State	4	–	3	8	–	4
Weber State	4	–	3	8	–	4
Eastern Washington	3	–	4	6	–	5
Portland State	1	–	6	4	–	7
Sacramento State	1	–	6	2	–	9
+ – Conference co-champions; ^ – NCAA Division I-AA playoff participant; Rankings from The Sports Network poll

2003 Big South Conference football standings
	Conf.			Overall
Team	W		L	W		L
Gardner–Webb $	4	–	0	8	–	4
Liberty	3	–	1	6	–	6
VMI	2	–	2	6	–	6
Coastal Carolina	1	–	3	6	–	5
Charleston Southern	0	–	4	1	–	11
$ – Conference champion

2003 Gateway Football Conference standings
	Conf.			Overall
Team	W		L	W		L
No. 5 Northern Iowa +^	6	–	1	10	–	3
No. 9 Southern Illinois +^	6	–	1	10	–	2
No. 6 Western Illinois ^	5	–	2	9	–	4
No. 7 Western Kentucky ^	5	–	2	9	–	4
Illinois State	3	–	4	6	–	6
Youngstown State	2	–	5	5	–	7
Southwest Missouri State	1	–	6	4	–	7
Indiana State	0	–	7	3	–	9
+ – Conference co-champions; ^ – NCAA Division I-AA playoff participant; Rankings from The Sports Network poll

2003 Ivy League football standings
	Conf.			Overall
Team	W		L	W		L
No. 12 Penn $	7	–	0	10	–	0
Harvard	4	–	3	7	–	3
Brown	4	–	3	5	–	5
Yale	4	–	3	6	–	4
Dartmouth	4	–	3	5	–	5
Columbia	3	–	4	4	–	6
Princeton	2	–	5	2	–	8
Cornell	0	–	7	1	–	9
$ – Conference champion; Rankings from The Sports Network poll

2003 Metro Atlantic Athletic Conference football standings
	Conf.			Overall
Team	W		L	W		L
Duquesne $	5	–	0	8	–	3
Iona	4	–	1	6	–	5
Marist	2	–	3	4	–	6
La Salle	2	–	3	3	–	8
Saint Peter's	2	–	3	2	–	8
Siena	0	–	5	0	–	11
$ – Conference champion

2003 Mid-Eastern Athletic Conference football standings
	Conf.			Overall
Team	W		L	W		L
No. 16 North Carolina A&T $^	7	–	1	10	–	3
No. 15 Bethune–Cookman ^	6	–	2	9	–	3
South Carolina State	5	–	2	8	–	4
Hampton	5	–	2	7	–	4
Morgan State	4	–	3	6	–	5
Florida A&M	3	–	4	6	–	6
Howard	2	–	5	4	–	7
Delaware State	1	–	6	1	–	10
Norfolk State	0	–	8	1	–	11
$ – Conference champion; ^ – NCAA Division I-AA playoff participant; Rankings from The Sports Network poll

2003 Northeast Conference football standings
	Conf.			Overall
Team	W		L	W		L
Monmouth +	6	–	1	10	–	2
Albany +	6	–	1	7	–	4
Robert Morris	4	–	3	6	–	4
Stony Brook	4	–	3	6	–	4
Sacred Heart	3	–	4	6	–	5
Wagner	3	–	4	6	–	5
Central Connecticut State	2	–	4	3	–	8
Saint Francis (PA)	0	–	7	1	–	9
+ – Conference co-champions

2003 Ohio Valley Conference football standings
	Conf.			Overall
Team	W		L	W		L
No. 18 Jacksonville State $^	7	–	1	8	–	4
Eastern Kentucky	6	–	2	7	–	5
Samford	5	–	3	7	–	4
Tennessee State	5	–	3	7	–	5
Southeast Missouri State	5	–	3	5	–	7
Murray State	3	–	5	4	–	8
Eastern Illinois	3	–	5	4	–	8
Tennessee Tech	1	–	7	2	–	9
Tennessee–Martin	1	–	7	2	–	10
$ – Conference champion; ^ – NCAA Division I-AA playoff participant; Rankings from The Sports Network poll

2003 Patriot League football standings
	Conf.			Overall
Team	W		L	W		L
No. 2 Colgate $^	7	–	0	15	–	1
No. 23 Lehigh	6	–	1	8	–	3
Fordham	4	–	3	9	–	3
Bucknell	4	–	3	6	–	6
Towson	3	–	4	6	–	6
Lafayette	2	–	5	5	–	6
Georgetown	1	–	6	4	–	8
Holy Cross	1	–	6	1	–	11
$ – Conference champion; ^ – NCAA Division I-AA playoff participant; Rankings from The Sports Network poll

2003 Pioneer Football League standings
	Conf.			Overall
Team	W		L	W		L
North Division
Valparaiso xy$	3	–	1	8	–	4
San Diego x	3	–	1	8	–	2
Dayton	2	–	2	9	–	2
Drake	1	–	3	6	–	6
Butler	1	–	3	2	–	9
South Division
Morehead State xy	3	–	0	8	–	3
Jacksonville	1	–	2	4	–	6
Austin Peay	1	–	2	4	–	7
Davidson	1	–	2	3	–	8
Championship: Valparaiso 54, Morehead State 42
$ – Conference champion; x – Division champion/co-champions; y – Championship game participant

2003 Southern Conference football standings
	Conf.			Overall
Team	W		L	W		L
No. 3 Wofford $^	8	–	0	12	–	2
Appalachian State	6	–	2	7	–	4
No. 24 Georgia Southern	5	–	3	7	–	4
Furman	4	–	4	6	–	5
The Citadel	4	–	4	6	–	6
Western Carolina	3	–	5	5	–	7
Chattanooga	3	–	5	3	–	9
East Tennessee State	2	–	6	5	–	7
Elon	1	–	7	2	–	10
$ – Conference champion; ^ – NCAA Division I-AA playoff participant; Rankings from The Sports Network poll

2003 Southland Conference football standings
	Conf.			Overall
Team	W		L	W		L
No. 8 McNeese State $^	5	–	0	10	–	2
Stephen F. Austin	4	–	1	7	–	4
Northwestern State	2	–	3	7	–	5
Texas State	2	–	3	5	–	7
Sam Houston State	2	–	3	3	–	8
Nicholls State†	0	–	5	0	–	11
$ – Conference champion; ^ – NCAA Division I-AA playoff participant; † – Nicholls State forfeited 5 wins, including 3 conference victories.; Rankings from The Sports Network poll

2003 Southwestern Athletic Conference football standings
	Conf.			Overall
Team	W		L	W		L
East Division
Alabama State xy	5	–	2	8	–	5
Alcorn State x	5	–	2	7	–	5
Alabama A&M	4	–	3	8	–	4
Jackson State	2	–	5	2	–	10
Mississippi Valley State	1	–	6	2	–	9
West Division
No. 13 Southern xy$	6	–	1	12	–	1
No. 17 Grambling State x	6	–	1	9	–	3
Texas Southern	3	–	4	5	–	6
Arkansas–Pine Bluff	3	–	4	4	–	7
Prairie View A&M	0	–	7	1	–	10
Championship: Southern 20, Alabama State 9
$ – Conference champion; x – Division champion/co-champions; Rankings from The Sports Network Poll

2003 NCAA Division I-AA independents football standings
	Conf.			Overall
Team	W		L	W		L
No. 4 Florida Atlantic ^		–		11	–	3
Cal Poly		–		7	–	4
Southeastern Louisiana		–		5	–	7
Southern Utah		–		4	–	7
Saint Mary's		–		1	–	11
FIU		–		0	–	10
Savannah State		–		0	–	12
^ – NCAA Division I-AA playoff participant; Record adjusted for 2 vacated wins by FIU; Rankings from The Sports Network poll

== Conference champions ==
Conference Champions

Atlantic 10 Conference – Delaware and UMass
Big Sky Conference – Montana, Montana State, and Northern Arizona
Big South Conference – Gardner-Webb
Gateway Football Conference – Northern Iowa and Southern Illinois
Ivy League – Penn
Metro Atlantic Athletic Conference – Duquesne
Mid-Eastern Athletic Conference – North Carolina A&T
Northeast Conference – Albany (NY) and Monmouth
Ohio Valley Conference – Jacksonville State
Patriot League – Colgate
Pioneer Football League – Valparaiso
Southern Conference – Wofford
Southland Conference – McNeese State
Southwestern Athletic Conference – Southern

== Postseason ==
=== NCAA Division I-AA playoff bracket ===
The top four teams in the tournament were seeded; seeded teams were assured of hosting games in the first two rounds.

First Round; November 29; Campus sites
1	McNeese State*	3
Northern Arizona	35
Bethune–Cookman*	24
Florida Atlantic	32
4	Colgate*	19
UMass	7
Montana*	40
Western Illinois	43**
3	Wofford*	31
North Carolina A&T	0
Western Kentucky*	45
Jacksonville State	7
2	Delaware*	48
Southern Illinois	7
Northern Iowa*	35
Montana State	14

Quarterfinals; December 6 Campus sites
Northern Arizona*	25
Florida Atlantic	48
4	Colgate*	28
Western Illinois	27
3	Wofford*	34
Western Kentucky	17
2	Delaware*	37
Northern Iowa	7

Semifinals; December 13; Campus sites
Florida Atlantic*	24
4	Colgate	36
3	Wofford	9
2	Delaware*	24

National Championship Game; December 19; Finley Stadium; Chattanooga, TN
4	Colgate	0
2	Delaware	40

* By team name denotes host institution
* By score denotes overtime period(s)

== Awards and honors ==
=== Walter Payton Award voting ===
The Walter Payton Award is given to the year's most outstanding player

Player	School	Position	1st	2nd	3rd	4th	5th	Total
Jamaal Branch	Colgate	RB	35	23	10	6	1	310
Bruce Eugene	Grambling State	QB	17	22	15	8	3	237
Andy Hall	Delaware	QB	17	18	13	9	5	219
Vick King	McNeese State	RB	4	8	6	3	6	82
Charles Anthony	Tennessee State	RB	5	4	5	5	8	74
Russ Michna	Western Illinois	QB	4	2	5	6	6	61
Efrem Hill	Samford	WR	3	1	7	7	4	58
Jason Murrietta	Northern Arizona	QB	0	0	6	15	10	58
Quincy Richard	Southern	RB	0	5	5	5	10	55
Rob Giancola	Valparaiso	QB	1	3	4	7	5	48
Allen Suber	Bethune–Cookman	QB	4	1	4	4	4	48
Alvin Cowan	Yale	QB	1	1	2	7	12	41
Kirwin Watson	Fordham	RB	0	0	3	6	9	30
Terrance Freeney	Northern Iowa	RB	1	1	3	2	4	26
Jermaine Austin	Georgia Southern	RB	0	2	1	2	2	17
Marcus Williams	Maine	RB	0	1	2	0	3	13
B.J. Sams	McNeese State	RB	0	0	3	0	0	3
