= Vick King =

American football player (born 1980)

No. 33
- Position: Running back

Personal information
- Born: February 4, 1980 (age 46); Houma, Louisiana, U.S.
- Listed height: 5 ft 10 in (1.78 m)
- Listed weight: 215 lb (98 kg)

Career information
- High school: South Lafourche (LA)
- College: Southern; McNeese State
- NFL draft: 2004: undrafted

Career history
- Tennessee Titans (2004)*; Miami Dolphins (2004); New York Jets (2005)*
- * Offseason or practice squad member only

Career NFL statistics
- Games played: 2
- Rushing yards: 9
- Receiving yards: 8
- Touchdowns: 0
- Stats at Pro Football Reference

Vick Lee King (born February 4, 1980) is an American former professional football player who was a running back in the National Football League (NFL). He was signed by the Tennessee Titans as an undrafted free agent in 2004. He played college football for the McNeese State Cowboys.

== College career ==
In three seasons at McNeese State University, King rushed for 3,167 yards (5.6avg) and 26 touchdowns. He caught 23 passes for 128 yards and one touchdown. His accolades include:

- 2003 Walter Payton Award Semi-Finalist
- Blue-Gray Game Participant
- Southland Conference Offensive Player of the Year
- 1st Team Dan Hansen Football Gazette All-South Team
- 4th All-Time Leading Rusher
- 7th All-Time Leader in Career Touchdowns.

== Professional career ==
King was a member of the Miami Dolphins and New York Jets.
