= Richard Washington (American football) =

American football player (born 1985)

Profile
- Position: Defensive lineman

Personal information
- Born: April 12, 1985 (age 41); Miami, Florida, U.S.
- Listed height: 6 ft 2 in (1.88 m)
- Listed weight: 305 lb (138 kg)

Career information
- College: Delaware; Clark-Atlanta
- NFL draft: 2009: undrafted

Career history
- Atlanta Falcons (2009); Arkansas Diamonds (2010); Georgia Force (2011)*; Kansas City Command (2011)*; Jacksonville Sharks (2011); Kansas City Command (2012)
- * Offseason or practice squad member only

Richard Charles Washington, Jr. (born April 12, 1985) is an American former football player. He played college football as a defensive lineman for the University of Delaware before transferring to Clark Atlanta University. He played for the Arkansas Diamonds of the Indoor Football League (IFL) in 2010.

He was assigned to the Georgia Force of the Arena Football League (AFL) on September 29, 2010, and was traded to the Kansas City Command on November 15, 2010, in exchange for future considerations. He was traded to the Jacksonville Sharks on December 7, 2010, in exchange for future considerations. He was placed on injured reserve on May 19, 2011.

He was assigned to the Command on October 17, 2011. He was placed on injured reserve on July 12, 2012. On August 23, 2012, the Command announced the team would not play in 2013, and eventually ceased operations.

== Personal life ==
Washington attended Plantation High School in Plantation, Florida. He earned a full scholarship to multiple Division 1 schools such as North Carolina State and Wake Forest but did not academically qualify.
