= Delaware–William & Mary football rivalry =

American college football rivalry

- Delaware Fightin' Blue Hens William & Mary Tribe
- Sport: College football
- First meeting: November 25, 1915; Delaware, 93–0
- Latest meeting: October 8, 2022; William & Mary, 27–21

Statistics
- Total meetings: 44
- All-time series: Delaware leads, 25–19
- Largest victory: Delaware, 93–0 (1915)
- Longest win streak: Delaware, 5 (1976–1983)
- Current win streak: William & Mary, 1 (2022–present)

Locations of Delaware and William & Mary

The Delaware–William & Mary football rivalry between the Delaware Fightin' Blue Hens and the William & Mary Tribe is a matchup between two public universities, the University of Delaware (UD) and the College of William & Mary (W&M), that are also members of both the Colonial Athletic Association and its legally separate football arm of CAA Football. Both schools have academic reputations that have labeled them as Public Ivies. Both schools are also colonial colleges, having been founded before the United States became independent in 1776; W&M was founded in 1693 and UD's predecessor school was founded in 1743.

The football series began in 1915 and has been played a total of 44 times as of 2022.

On November 27, 2023, it was announced that the Delaware Fightin' Blue Hens football program had accepted an invitation to move up to the FBS Subdivision and would join Conference USA prior to the 2025 football season. There are no future meetings scheduled.

== History ==
The game has been a conference matchup in CAA Football and its two direct predecessors of the Atlantic 10 Conference and Yankee Conference since W&M joined the Yankee Conference in 1993. During CAA Football's divisional eras (2007–2009, plus the COVID-disrupted 2020–21 season), both teams played in the league's South Division. During this period, the two teams have combined for one National Championship (Delaware in 2003), two shared Conference Championships (2004 and 2010) and seven standalone conference titles (Delaware in 1995, 2000, 2003, and 2010 and William & Mary in 1996 and 2001). With the exception of the 1915 game held at Frazer Field, all of Delaware's home games have been hosted at Delaware Stadium in Newark, Delaware. William & Mary has hosted its contests at Zable Stadium in Williamsburg, Virginia; as of 2019, no games have been played on a neutral field.

== Game results ==
Delaware victories	William & Mary victories

No.	Date	Location	Winner	Score
1	November 25, 1915	Newark, DE	Delaware	93–0
2	November 10, 1923	Williamsburg, VA	William & Mary	14–0
3	October 9, 1976	Williamsburg, VA	Delaware	15–13
4	October 27, 1979	Newark, DE	Delaware	40–0
5	October 25, 1980	Williamsburg, VA	Delaware	7–3
6	October 30, 1982	Newark, DE	Delaware	62–21
7	September 17, 1983	Newark, DE	Delaware	30–13
8	September 15, 1984	Newark, DE	William & Mary	23–21
9	September 21, 1985	Williamsburg, VA	William & Mary	17–16
10	October 18, 1986	Newark, DE	William & Mary	24–18
11	November 29, 1986	Williamsburg, VA	Delaware	51–17
12	October 17, 1987	Williamsburg, VA	Delaware	38–14
13	October 8, 1988	Newark, DE	Delaware	38–35
14	October 7, 1989	Williamsburg, VA	William & Mary	27–24
15	October 6, 1990	Newark, DE	William & Mary	22–12
16	September 14, 1991	Williamsburg, VA	Delaware	28–21
17	September 11, 1993	Newark, DE	Delaware	42–35
18	September 10, 1994	Williamsburg, VA	William & Mary	31–7
19	November 4, 1995	Newark, DE	Delaware	42–35
20	November 2, 1996	Williamsburg, VA	William & Mary	10–7 (OT)
21	November 1, 1997	Newark, DE	Delaware	14–0
22	October 10, 1998	Williamsburg, VA	William & Mary	52–45
23	September 2, 1999	Newark, DE	Delaware	34–27 (2OT)

No.	Date	Location	Winner	Score
24	October 14, 2000	Williamsburg, VA	Delaware	28–17
25	October 20, 2001	Newark, DE	William & Mary	21–17
26	September 28, 2002	Williamsburg, VA	William & Mary	45–42
27	October 4, 2003	Newark, DE	Delaware	41–27
28	October 23, 2004	Newark, DE	Delaware	31–28
29	December 4, 2004	Williamsburg, VA	William & Mary	44–38 (OT)
30	November 12, 2005	Williamsburg, VA	Delaware	22–21
31	November 11, 2006	Newark, DE	Delaware	28–14
32	August 30, 2007	Williamsburg, VA	Delaware	49–31
33	October 18, 2008	Newark, DE	William & Mary	27–3
34	September 26, 2009	Williamsburg, VA	William & Mary	30–20
35	October 23, 2010	Williamsburg, VA	William & Mary	17–16
36	October 8, 2011	Newark, DE	Delaware	21–0
37	September 22, 2012	Williamsburg, VA	Delaware	51–21
38	November 9, 2013	Newark, DE	William & Mary	24–10
39	October 25, 2014	Williamsburg, VA	William & Mary	31–17
40	October 3, 2015	Newark, DE	Delaware	24–23
41	October 15, 2016	Williamsburg, VA	William & Mary	24–17
42	October 14, 2017	Newark, DE	Delaware	17–0
43	November 6, 2021	Newark, DE	Delaware	24–3
44	October 8, 2022	Williamsburg, VA	William & Mary	27–21
Series: Delaware leads 25–19

== See also ==
- List of NCAA college football rivalry games
