= Andy Hall (American football) =

American football player (born 1980)

No. 9, 7
- Position: Quarterback

Personal information
- Born: November 26, 1980 (age 45); Cheraw, South Carolina, U.S.
- Listed height: 6 ft 2 in (1.88 m)
- Listed weight: 218 lb (99 kg)

Career information
- High school: Cheraw
- College: Georgia Tech (2000–2001); Delaware (2003)
- NFL draft: 2004: 6th round, 185th overall pick

Career history
- Philadelphia Eagles (2004–2005); → Rhein Fire (2005); Las Vegas Gladiators (2006); Nashville Kats (2007); Tennessee Valley Vipers (2008); Austin Wranglers (2008)
- Stats at Pro Football Reference

Andrew Steven Hall (born November 26, 1980) is an American former professional football player who was a quarterback in the National Football League (NFL), Arena Football League (AFL) and af2. He was selected by the Philadelphia Eagles in the sixth round of the 2004 NFL draft. He played college football for the Georgia Tech Yellow Jackets before transferring to the Delaware Fightin' Blue Hens.

== Early life ==
Hall attended Cheraw High School in Cheraw, South Carolina, where he lettered in football and baseball. Playing pitcher, he led the school's baseball team to the South Carolina AA State Championship title, during which he pitched a no-hitter in the championship game, and was selected to the North/South All-Star team. He was named 2a player of the year as a senior in baseball while leading the state in home runs. He was named to the South Carolina Shrine bowl football team as a senior.

== College career ==
Hall attended the University of Delaware and led the Fightin' Blue Hens to the 2003 Division I-AA National Championship. He transferred to Delaware after starting his career at Georgia Tech. His wife, Mary Melissa Bailey, was a Georgia Tech cheerleader, seven-time All-American cheerleader, and 2004 Cheersport National Partner Stunt Champion with King Harrison.

In 2003, while on the way to the national championship, Hall was named the Atlantic 10 Conference's offensive player of the year. He was also honored as the Tri-State Player of the Year, University of Delaware Male Athlete of the Year, and finished third for the Walter Payton Award, all during his senior year at Delaware. He completed 62 percent of his passes for 2,764 yards and 25 touchdowns. Hall also ran for 710 yards and eight more touchdowns.

Hall finished his college career at Delaware with a school-record 57.4 completion percentage for 4,596 yards and 34 touchdowns. He also became fifth on the school's all-time list with 6,169 yards of total offense.

In 2024, Delaware announced that it will be inducting Hall into the Delaware Athletic Hall of Fame, alongside Hall's coach K. C. Keeler.

== Professional career ==
=== Philadelphia Eagles ===
Hall was selected by the Philadelphia Eagles with the 185th overall selection in the sixth round of the 2004 NFL draft. He spent two years with the team. Before the 2005 season, he was allocated to the Rhein Fire of NFL Europe.

=== Las Vegas Gladiators ===
Hall was acquired by the Las Vegas Gladiators of the Arena Football League before the 2006 season.

=== Nashville Kats ===
Hall spent the 2007 season with the Nashville Kats.

=== Austin Wranglers ===
Hall played for the Austin Wranglers in 2008, where he led the team to the playoffs and was named to the All-Arena League Team.
