= Football Network =

The Football Network
- Country: US

Ownership
- Owner: TFN - The Football Network, Inc.

History
- Launched: September 5, 1998

Links
- Website: footballnetwork.com archived

The Football Network was a network that covered all aspects of American football, including the NFL, college football, high school, and various semi-pro and indoor leagues. The network was owned by TFN, The Football Network, Inc. a public traded corporation (OTCBB: TFBN).

TFN is one of the few nationwide TV networks in the United States that has ever been owned by an African-American.

== History ==
=== Founding ===
The Football Network was founded in 1996 by Jantonio Turner, when he wanted to find more football highlights and discovered that no other all-football channel existed. He was first mentored by Sheldon Altfeld, who had launched his own channel and was giving seminars to entrepreneurs who wished to begin their own networks.

On September 5, 1998, a preview airing of the channel occurred on a C-band satellite. The channel continued this part-time broadcast of two hours every Saturday, with an hour on two different transponders. The network signed a letter of intent, an early step towards a master agreement, with the National Cable Television Cooperative.

The Football Network went public on October 20, 1998, when it began trading on the OTC bulletin board to help it attract the funding necessary to launch. Over the next few years the company laid the groundwork for the establishment of a channel from extensive qualitative and quantitative market research, to hiring Newberger Greenberg and Associates, the media consulting firm who did the business plans for The Golf Channel.

In 2001, Jerry Solomon, husband of Nancy Kerrigan, joined the network.

By 2003, a number of other single sports channels, including Black Belt TV, the Ice Channel, NFL Network and Tennis Channel, joined TFN in looking to launch on the new digital tier of cable. While Gol TV and College Sports Television launched in early 2003. By March 2003, the network and the 13 conferences of the NCCAA Division I-AA agreed to start the NCAA Division I-AA College Football All-Star Classic to be held and broadcast on December 30.

In May 2003, the company agreed to a deal to be headquartered in Baton Rouge, temporarily at the Louisiana Public Broadcasting's studios. Meanwhile, a permanent facility would be constructed at the Bon Carré Business Park. As a part of the deal, the state would take less than 10% equity stake in the company and grant 15 year tax credits. Previously, the company was located in Lynnfield, Massachusetts.

In July 2003 the Spike channel agreed to carry an hour of TFN programming a week. By August 2003, The Football Network signed the Atlantic 10 Conference, followed by the Patriot and Pioneer leagues and the Southern, Big Sky, and Big South conferences. For the University of Maine Black Bears, an Atlantic 10 team, TFN planned to produce and simulcast live eight games for Fox Sports Net New England and the network. The National Cable Television Cooperative signed a master agreement with the network by August 18 for its member cable operators to allow them to pick up the channel.

The network was syndicating its programming in late August 2003 until its cable launch. TFN had 50 Division I-AA games on its first year's schedule.

In early September 2003, a controversy occurred as the NFL did not let Fox Sports Net use footage for its fantasy sports shows. It was revealed by Solomon that TFN did not even request footage usage, but was surprised by the NFL's refusal to its broadcasting partner Fox Sport. Also by early September it was reported by the Toronto Star that the Canadian Football League was moving to get its games back on US national television by asking for bids from TFN, Fox Sports Net and the WB.

On September 26, 2003, the network had a soft launch, with a targeted hard launch on November 1. Before the hard launch, the network was allowing cable systems to pick the network up for free. The expected contract rate for the operators at the time was free for the first two years, and would go to around 10 cents per subscriber thereafter. By December 2003, the network, Cox Communications and Time Warner Cable agreed to allow their local systems to determine if TFN would be carried on that system.

Some programming was still being syndicated while being simulcast on TFN. For example, the Yale-Columbia Ivy League game in early November was on The Football Network while being shown on seven TV outlets, including cable channel Empire Sports Network via tape delay on November 2.

The channel aired for a while, only go off the air late in the year, in the week of December 8, putting its production crew of 30 on unpaid furlough. The Football Network also canceled the Division I-AA all star game, the key show of its launch. Its Spike fantasy show was also canceled that week. The network had by this time produced 70 games. Slow capital raising and slow cable operator pickup had hampered the network. CEO Solomon indicated that $5 million to $7 million was needed to return to broadcasting by its new target date of January 19, 2004. Over the previous two years, since Solomon had joined TFN, the company had spent $3.5 million per year, ending with $2 million in debt.

Mounting costs and very low distribution, combined with the NFL launching their network, Fox Sports Net launching their College Sports suite, and the higher profile launch of CSTV, made lasting on the air difficult.

By October 2004, Solomon had left the CEO position. In June 2005, Robert Lucey, president of Putnam Investments, was named to the company board of directors. Turner announced on August 4, 2009, a reorganization plan for TFN. The company moved its headquarters into in the Bon Carré Business Park.

== Programming ==
While planning not to carry any NFL games and no major college games, plans included having Arena Football, Australian Rules football, college Division I-AA, high school, Pop Warner, the World League and classic replay games. Additional programs were planned in the form of fantasy, instruction, movies, news, talk and highlight shows and player profiles.

- CFL Playoff Game
- College Football Today
- Echoes of Glory - College Football Hall of Fame
- Founded 2003: Birth of a Tradition, formerly Coastal Carolina: Making of a Dream, a documentary series and first program aired; followed the first year of Coastal Carolina University's football program
- College Football Scoreboard
- Fantasy Football Countdown
- TFN Preview Show
- TFN Tonight, a nightly wrap-up show
- Preps Game of the Week
- Spike, syndicated
  - Fantasy Football 2003 with Danny Sheridan, Paul Crane and Jerry Glanville
  - Football 101 with Kathleen Murphy and D'Marco Farr

=== Division I-AA College Football All-Star Classic ===
By March 2003, the network and the 13 conferences of the NCCAA Division I-AA agreed to start the NCAA Division I-AA College Football All-Star Classic to be held and broadcast on December 30 in Fort Lauderdale, Florida. The two teams would be named after famous I-AA coach Eddie Robinson and player Walter Payton. One of the first 50 chosen to play in the all star game was Southeast Missouri State University senior quarterback Jack Tomco. By November 3, 2003, American Airlines had signed on as presenting sponsor in a primarily barter deal, trading travel arrangements for coaches and players for advertising and category exclusivity during the game; additional promotion on TFN's website, its Sports Byline USA weekly radio segment and sideline banners and scoreboard; plus tickets and hospitality.

== Presenters ==
- Lisa Chelenza, sideline reporter
- Paul Crane, play-by-play, presenter
- Jerry Glanville, studio host, color commentator
- Kathleen Murphy, presenter
- Danny Sheridan, presenter
- Pat Summerall, network voice
