= Bob Spoo =

American football player and coach (1937–2018)

Biographical details
- Born: November 2, 1937; Chicago, Illinois, U.S.
- Died: October 15, 2018 (aged 80); Rockford, Illinois, U.S.

Playing career
- 1956–1958: Purdue
- Position: Quarterback

Coaching career (HC unless noted)
- 1961: Fenwick HS (IL) (assistant)
- 1962: St. Laurence HS (IL)
- 1963–1966: Loyola Academy (IL) (backfield)
- 1967–1972: Loyola Academy (IL)
- 1973–1977: Wisconsin (QB)
- 1978–1984: Purdue (QB)
- 1985–1986: Purdue (OC)
- 1987–2005: Eastern Illinois
- 2007–2011: Eastern Illinois

Head coaching record
- Overall: 144–131–1 (college)
- Bowls: 1–8 (NCAA D-I-AA/FCS playoffs)

Accomplishments and honors

Championships
- 1 Gateway Football (1995); 4 OVC (2001–2002, 2005, 2009)

Awards
- Gateway Football Coach of the Year (1995); 3× OVC Coach of the Year (2001, 2005, 2009)

Robert Allen Spoo (November 2, 1937 – October 15, 2018) was an American college football coach. He served as the head football coach at Eastern Illinois University from 1987 to 2011 (with an interruption in 2006 due to surgery), compiling a record of 144–131–1. Spoo led the Eastern Illinois Panthers to five conference titles, nine playoff berths, and ten finishes in the Top 25 polls. He coached nine First Team All-Americans, including Tristan Burge and Tony Romo.

Spoo was an alumnus of Purdue University and a former quarterback on the Purdue Boilermakers football team. Prior to receiving the head coaching position at Eastern Illinois, Spoo served as an assistant at Purdue and the University of Wisconsin–Madison. He also coached at the high school level.

Spoo and his wife, Suzie, had one daughter. After retiring, the Spoos continued to reside in Charleston, Illinois. He died on October 15, 2018, at the age of 80.

== Head coaching record ==
=== College ===
Year	Team	Overall	Conference	Standing	Bowl/playoffs	NCAA/TSN^{#}	USA/ESPN^{°}
Eastern Illinois Panthers (Gateway Football Conference) (1987–1995)
1987	Eastern Illinois	5–6	3–3	T–3rd			
1988	Eastern Illinois	5–6	2–4	T–5th			
1989	Eastern Illinois	9–4	4–2	2nd	L NCAA Division I-AA Quarterfinal	15	
1990	Eastern Illinois	5–6	3–3	T–3rd			
1991	Eastern Illinois	4–7	2–4	T–5th			
1992	Eastern Illinois	5–6	2–4	T–3rd			
1993	Eastern Illinois	3–7–1	2–3–1	T–4th			
1994	Eastern Illinois	6–5	4–2	T–2nd			
1995	Eastern Illinois	10–2	5–1	T–1st	L NCAA Division I-AA First Round	12	
Eastern Illinois Panthers (Ohio Valley Conference) (1996–2005)
1996	Eastern Illinois	8–4	6–2	T–2nd	L NCAA Division I-AA First Round	16	
1997	Eastern Illinois	8–3	5–2	T–2nd		21	22
1998	Eastern Illinois	6–5	4–3	T–4th			
1999	Eastern Illinois	2–10	2–5	T–6th			
2000	Eastern Illinois	8–4	6–1	2nd	L NCAA Division I-AA First Round	17	22
2001	Eastern Illinois	9–2	6–0	1st	L NCAA Division I-AA First Round	9	9
2002	Eastern Illinois	8–4	5–1	T–1st	L NCAA Division I-AA First Round	13	12
2003	Eastern Illinois	4–8	3–5	T–5th			
2004	Eastern Illinois	5–6	4–4	4th			
2005	Eastern Illinois	9–3	8–0	1st	L NCAA Division I-AA First Round	16	15
Eastern Illinois Panthers (Ohio Valley Conference) (2007–2011)
2007	Eastern Illinois	8–4	7–1	2nd	L NCAA Division I First Round	18	
2008	Eastern Illinois	5–7	3–5	6th			
2009	Eastern Illinois	8–4	6–2	1st	L NCAA Division I First Round	19	
2010	Eastern Illinois	2–9	2–6	7th			
2011	Eastern Illinois	2–9	1–7	9th			
Eastern Illinois:		144–131–1	68–44				
Total:		144–131–1					
National championship Conference title Conference division title or championship game berth
