= 2003 Charleston Southern Buccaneers football team =

American college football season

2003 Charleston Southern Buccaneers football
- Conference: Big South Conference
- Record: 1–11 (0–4 Big South)
- Head coach: Jay Mills (1st season)
- Defensive coordinator: Steve Barrows (1st season)
- Home stadium: Buccaneer Field

2003 Big South Conference football standings
	Conf.			Overall
Team	W		L	W		L
Gardner–Webb $	4	–	0	8	–	4
Liberty	3	–	1	6	–	6
VMI	2	–	2	6	–	6
Coastal Carolina	1	–	3	6	–	5
Charleston Southern	0	–	4	1	–	11
$ – Conference champion

The 2003 Charleston Southern Buccaneers football team represented Charleston Southern University as a member of the Big South Conference during the 2003 NCAA Division I-AA football season. Led by first-year head coach Jay Mills, the Buccaneers compiled an overall record of 1–11 with a mark of 0–4 in conference play, finishing last place in the Big South.

== Schedule ==
Date	Time	Opponent	Site	Result	Attendance	Source
August 30	3:30 pm	at The Citadel*	Johnson Hagood Stadium; Charleston, SC	L 10–64	15,219	
September 6	1:30 pm	at Wingate*	Irwin Belk Stadium; Wingate, NC	L 6–22	2,275	
September 13	1:30 pm	Presbyterian*	Buccaneer Field; North Charleston, SC	L 14–17	1,941	
September 20	1:30 pm	West Virginia State*	Buccaneer Field; North Charleston, SC	W 49–42	1,116	
September 27	1:30 pm	Tusculum*	Buccaneer Field; North Charleston, SC	L 7–58	1,028	
October 11	1:00 pm	at VMI	Alumni Memorial Field; Lexington, VA	L 7–50	4,325	
October 18	7:00 pm	at South Florida*	Raymond James Stadium; Tampa, FL	L 7–55	28,365	
October 25	1:30 pm	North Greenville*	Buccaneer Field; North Charleston, SC	L 21–49	1,941	
November 1	12:00 pm	Liberty	Buccaneer Field; North Charleston, SC	L 6–17	2,219	
November 8	1:30 pm	at Gardner–Webb	Ernest W. Spangler Stadium; Boiling Springs, NC	L 0–46	5,208	
November 15	1:30 pm	at James Madison*	Bridgeforth Stadium; Harrisonburg, VA	L 7–45	7,403	
November 22	1:30 pm	Coastal Carolina	Buccaneer Field; North Charleston, SC	L 14–48	1,831	
*Non-conference game; All times are in Eastern time
