= 2003 Alabama A&M Bulldogs football team =

American college football season

2003 Alabama A&M Bulldogs football
- Conference: Southwestern Athletic Conference
- East Division
- Record: 8–4 (4–3 SWAC)
- Head coach: Anthony Jones (2nd season)
- Home stadium: Louis Crews Stadium

2003 Southwestern Athletic Conference football standings
	Conf.			Overall
Team	W		L	W		L
East Division
Alabama State xy	5	–	2	8	–	5
Alcorn State x	5	–	2	7	–	5
Alabama A&M	4	–	3	8	–	4
Jackson State	2	–	5	2	–	10
Mississippi Valley State	1	–	6	2	–	9
West Division
No. 13 Southern xy$	6	–	1	12	–	1
No. 17 Grambling State x	6	–	1	9	–	3
Texas Southern	3	–	4	5	–	6
Arkansas–Pine Bluff	3	–	4	4	–	7
Prairie View A&M	0	–	7	1	–	10
Championship: Southern 20, Alabama State 9
$ – Conference champion; x – Division champion/co-champions; Rankings from The Sports Network Poll

The 2003 Alabama A&M Bulldogs football team represented Alabama A&M University as a member of the Southwestern Athletic Conference (SWAC) during the 2003 NCAA Division I-AA football season. Led by second-year head coach Anthony Jones, the Bulldogs compiled an overall record of 8–4, with a conference record of 4–3, and finished third in the SWAC East Division.

== Schedule ==
Date	Opponent	Site	Result	Attendance	Source
August 30	Jacksonville State*	Louis Crews Stadium; Huntsville, AL	L 3–9	13,004	
September 6	Tennessee State*	Louis Crews Stadium; Huntsville, AL	W 31–24		
September 13	vs. No. 14 Grambling State	Independence Stadium; Shreveport, LA	L 14–45	6,962	
September 20	at Mississippi Valley State	Rice–Totten Stadium; Itta Bena, MS	W 37–0		
September 27	at Prairie View A&M	Edward L. Blackshear Field; Prairie View, TX	W 50–10		
October 4	Texas Southern	Louis Crews Stadium; Normal, AL	W 63–0		
October 11	at No. 18 Southern	A. W. Mumford Stadium; Baton Rouge, LA	L 25–55	26,400	
October 18	vs. Savannah State*	Augusta, GA	W 41–0		
October 25	vs. Alabama State	Legion Field; Birmingham, AL (Magic City Classic)	W 20–17		
November 8	Jackson State	Louis Crews Stadium; Normal, AL	W 49–14		
November 15	at Alcorn State	Jack Spinks Stadium; Lorman, MS	L 15–20		
November 22	Arkansas–Pine Bluff	Louis Crews Stadium; Normal, AL	W 50–0		
*Non-conference game; Rankings from The Sports Network Poll released prior to the game
