= 2003 Howard Bison football team =

American college football season

2003 Howard Bison football
- Conference: Mid-Eastern Athletic Conference
- Record: 4–7 (2–5 MEAC)
- Head coach: Rayford Petty (2nd season)
- Home stadium: William H. Greene Stadium

2003 Mid-Eastern Athletic Conference football standings
	Conf.			Overall
Team	W		L	W		L
No. 16 North Carolina A&T $^	7	–	1	10	–	3
No. 15 Bethune–Cookman ^	6	–	2	9	–	3
South Carolina State	5	–	2	8	–	4
Hampton	5	–	2	7	–	4
Morgan State	4	–	3	6	–	5
Florida A&M	3	–	4	6	–	6
Howard	2	–	5	4	–	7
Delaware State	1	–	6	1	–	10
Norfolk State	0	–	8	1	–	11
$ – Conference champion; ^ – NCAA Division I-AA playoff participant; Rankings from The Sports Network poll

The 2003 Howard Bison football team represented Howard University as a member of the Mid-Eastern Athletic Conference (MEAC) during the 2003 NCAA Division I-AA football season. Led by second-year head coach Rayford Petty, the Bison compiled an overall record of 4–7, with a conference record of 2–5, and finished seventh in the MEAC.

== Schedule ==
Date	Opponent	Site	Result	Attendance	Source
September 6	at Texas Southern*	Robertson Stadium; Houston, TX	L 20–27	10,000	
September 13	Hampton	William H. Greene Stadium; Washington, DC (rivalry)	L 14–17	10,500	
September 20	at Akron*	Rubber Bowl; Akron, OH	L 7–65	20,259	
September 27	at Savannah State*	Ted Wright Stadium; Savannah, GA	W 48–3		
October 11	Florida A&M	William H. Greene Stadium; Washington, DC	W 16–14	10,500	
October 18	at Morgan State	Hughes Stadium; Baltimore, MD (rivalry)	L 12–33	14,576	
October 25	at No. 23 North Carolina A&T	Aggie Stadium; Greensboro, NC	L 7–27	26,685	
November 1	at Norfolk State	William "Dick" Price Stadium; Norfolk, VA	W 42–28	16,972	
November 8	South Carolina State	William H. Greene Stadium; Washington, DC	L 14–24	6,059	
November 15	No. 16 Bethune–Cookman	William H. Greene Stadium; Washington, DC	L 7–21		
November 22	at Delaware State	Alumni Stadium; Dover, DE	W 21–6	2,871	
*Non-conference game; Rankings from The Sports Network Poll released prior to the game
