= 2003 Texas Southern Tigers football team =

American college football season

2003 Texas Southern Tigers football
- Conference: Southwestern Athletic Conference
- West Division
- Record: 6–5 (3–4 SWAC)
- Head coach: William A. Thomas (10th season)
- Home stadium: Reliant Stadium; Reliant Astrodome; Robertson Stadium

2003 Southwestern Athletic Conference football standings
	Conf.			Overall
Team	W		L	W		L
East Division
Alabama State xy	5	–	2	8	–	5
Alcorn State x	5	–	2	7	–	5
Alabama A&M	4	–	3	8	–	4
Jackson State	2	–	5	2	–	10
Mississippi Valley State	1	–	6	2	–	9
West Division
No. 13 Southern xy$	6	–	1	12	–	1
No. 17 Grambling State x	6	–	1	9	–	3
Texas Southern	3	–	4	5	–	6
Arkansas–Pine Bluff	3	–	4	4	–	7
Prairie View A&M	0	–	7	1	–	10
Championship: Southern 20, Alabama State 9
$ – Conference champion; x – Division champion/co-champions; Rankings from The Sports Network Poll

The 2003 Texas Southern Tigers football team represented Texas Southern University as a member of the Southwestern Athletic Conference (SWAC) during the 2003 NCAA Division I-AA football season. Led by tenth-year head coach William A. Thomas, the Tigers compiled an overall record of 6–5, with a mark of 3–4 in conference play, and finished tied for third in the West Division of the SWAC.

== Schedule ==
Date	Opponent	Site	Result	Attendance	Source
August 30	Prairie View A&M	Reliant Stadium; Houston, TX (Labor Day Classic)	W 42–3		
September 6	Howard*	Robertson Stadium; Houston, TX	W 27–20	10,000	
September 20	Jackson State	Reliant Astrodome; Houston, TX	L 21–28		
September 27	at Nicholls State*	John L. Guidry Stadium; Thibodaux, LA	W 5–64 (forfeit win)	8,200	
October 4	at Alabama A&M	Louis Crews Stadium; Normal, AL	L 0–63		
October 11	at Arkansas–Pine Bluff	Golden Lion Stadium; Pine Bluff, AR	W 7–6		
October 18	Alcorn State	Reliant Astrodome; Houston, TX	W 23–20		
October 25	at Mississippi Valley State	Rice–Totten Stadium; Itta Bena, MS	W 30–17		
November 1	at No. 14 Grambling State	Eddie G. Robinson Memorial Stadium; Grambling, LA	L 15–48	21,065	
November 15	No. 17 Southern	Robertson Stadium; Houston, TX	L 17–24	28,582	
November 22	Alabama State	Reliant Astrodome; Houston, TX	L 26–38		
*Non-conference game; Rankings from The Sports Network Poll released prior to the game
