= 2003 Davidson Wildcats football team =

American college football season

2003 Davidson Wildcats football
- Conference: Pioneer Football League
- South Division
- Record: 3–8 (1–2 PFL)
- Head coach: Mike Toop (3rd season)
- Home stadium: Richardson Stadium

2003 Pioneer Football League standings
	Conf.			Overall
Team	W		L	W		L
North Division
Valparaiso xy$	3	–	1	8	–	4
San Diego x	3	–	1	8	–	2
Dayton	2	–	2	9	–	2
Drake	1	–	3	6	–	6
Butler	1	–	3	2	–	9
South Division
Morehead State xy	3	–	0	8	–	3
Jacksonville	1	–	2	4	–	6
Austin Peay	1	–	2	4	–	7
Davidson	1	–	2	3	–	8
Championship: Valparaiso 54, Morehead State 42
$ – Conference champion; x – Division champion/co-champions; y – Championship game participant

The 2003 Davidson Wildcats football team represented Davidson College as a member of the South Division of the Pioneer Football League (PFL) during the 2003 NCAA Division I-AA football season. Led by third-year head coach Mike Toop, the Wildcats compiled an overall record of 3–8 with a mark of 1–2 in conference play, and tied for second in the PFL's South Division.

== Schedule ==
Date	Opponent	Site	Result	Attendance	Source
August 30	Wingate*	Richardson Stadium; Davidson, NC	L 10–22	3,651	
September 6	VMI*	Richardson Stadium; Davidson, NC	L 9–31	2,116	
September 13	San Diego*	Richardson Stadium; Davidson, NC	L 7–54		
September 20	at Butler*	Butler Bowl; Indianapolis, IN	W 45–27		
September 27	at Emory and Henry*	Fullerton Field; Emory, VA	W 45–21	4,245	
October 4	Dayton*^{†}	Richardson Stadium; Davidson, NC	L 25–32		
October 11	at Jacksonville	D. B. Milne Field; Jacksonville, FL	W 37–29	1,042	
October 18	at Morehead State	Jayne Stadium; Morehead, KY	L 10–35		
October 25	Austin Peay	Richardson Stadium; Davidson, NC	L 21–31		
November 8	Coastal Carolina*	Richardson Stadium; Davidson, NC	L 27–52	1,711	
November 15	at Georgetown*	Harbin Field; Washington, DC	L 10–30	1,114	
*Non-conference game; ^{†}Homecoming
