= 2003 FIU Golden Panthers football team =

American college football season

2003 FIU Golden Panthers football
- Conference: Independent
- Record: 0–10, 2 wins vacated
- Head coach: Don Strock (2nd season)
- Offensive coordinator: Greg Briner (2nd season)
- Offensive scheme: Pro-style
- Base defense: 4–3
- Home stadium: FIU Stadium

2003 NCAA Division I-AA independents football standings
	Conf.			Overall
Team	W		L	W		L
No. 4 Florida Atlantic ^		–		11	–	3
Cal Poly		–		7	–	4
Southeastern Louisiana		–		5	–	7
Southern Utah		–		4	–	7
Saint Mary's		–		1	–	11
FIU		–		0	–	10
Savannah State		–		0	–	12
^ – NCAA Division I-AA playoff participant; Record adjusted for 2 vacated wins by FIU; Rankings from The Sports Network poll

The 2003 FIU Golden Panthers football team represented Florida International University (FIU) as an independent during the 2003 NCAA Division I-AA football season. Led by second-year head coach Don Strock, the Panthers compiled a record of 2–10. The team played home game at FIU Stadium in Miami.

In 2008, the NCAA Division I Committee on Infractions found major violations within the FIU football program, and vacated the Panthers' two wins from the 2003 season.

== Schedule ==
Date	Opponent	Site	Result	Attendance	Source
September 6	at Indiana State	Memorial Stadium; Terre Haute, IN	L 10–13	2,565	
September 13	at No. 18 Maine	Alfond Sports Stadium; Orono, ME	L 14–24	6,227	
September 20	No. 7 Bethune–Cookman	FIU Stadium; Miami, FL	L 14–24	13,123	
September 27	No. 5 (D-II) Carson–Newman	FIU Stadium; Miami, FL	L 33–55	6,707	
October 4	at No. 13 Georgia Southern	Paulson Stadium; Statesboro, GA	L 35–37	10,409	
October 9	Stephen F. Austin	FIU Stadium; Miami, FL	L 13–35	5,299	
October 18	at Troy State	Movie Gallery Stadium; Troy, AL	L 10–21	19,417	
October 25	Holy Cross^{†}	FIU Stadium; Miami, FL	W 34–23 (vacated)	4,506	
October 30	Jacksonville	FIU Stadium; Miami, FL	W 55–12 (vacated)	3,512	
November 8	at Louisiana–Lafayette	Cajun Field; Lafayette, LA	L 10–43	13,571	
November 15	at Gardner–Webb	Ernest W. Spangler Stadium; Boiling Springs, NC	L 19–22 ^{OT}	1,106	
November 22	No. 14 Florida Atlantic	FIU Stadium; Miami, FL (Shula Bowl)	L 23–32	9,288	
^{†}Homecoming; Rankings from The Sports Network Poll released prior to the game
