= 2003 Coastal Carolina Chanticleers football team =

American college football season

2003 Coastal Carolina Chanticleers football
- Conference: Big South Conference
- Record: 6–5 (1–3 Big South)
- Head coach: David Bennett (1st season)
- Offensive coordinator: Jamie Snider (1st season)
- Offensive scheme: Multiple
- Defensive coordinator: Curtis Walker (1st season)
- Base defense: 4–3
- Home stadium: Brooks Stadium

2003 Big South Conference football standings
	Conf.			Overall
Team	W		L	W		L
Gardner–Webb $	4	–	0	8	–	4
Liberty	3	–	1	6	–	6
VMI	2	–	2	6	–	6
Coastal Carolina	1	–	3	6	–	5
Charleston Southern	0	–	4	1	–	11
$ – Conference champion

The 2003 Coastal Carolina Chanticleers football team represented Coastal Carolina University as a member of the Big South Conference during the 2003 NCAA Division I-AA football season. It was the inaugural season for the program. Led by first-year head coach David Bennett, the Chanticleers compiled an overall record of 6–5 with a mark of 1–3 in conference play, placing fourth in the Big South. Coastal Carolina played home games at Brooks Stadium in Conway, South Carolina.

== Schedule ==
Date	Time	Opponent	Site	Result	Attendance	Source
September 6	7:00 p.m.	Newberry*	Brooks Stadium; Conway, SC	W 21–14	7,894	
September 13	7:00 p.m.	Morehead State*	Brooks Stadium; Conway, SC	L 6–31	5,309	
September 20	12:30 p.m.	at Jacksonville*	D. B. Milne Field; Jacksonville, FL	L 9–14	1,516	
September 25	7:00 p.m.	at North Greenville*	Eastside High School Stadium; Taylors, SC	W 49–39	1,975	
October 4	7:00 p.m.	Gardner–Webb	Brooks Stadium; Conway, SC	L 17–38	6,632	
October 11	7:00 p.m.	Charleston (WV)*	Brooks Stadium; Conway, SC	W 47–0	6,592	
October 25	4:00 p.m.	at Savannah State*	Ted Wright Stadium; Savannah, GA	W 29–19	2,169	
November 1	12:30 p.m.	VMI^{†}	Brooks Stadium; Conway, SC	L 10–19	6,849	
November 8	1:00 p.m.	at Davidson*	Richardson Stadium; Davidson, NC	W 52–27	1,711	
November 15	1:30 p.m.	at Liberty	Williams Stadium; Lynchburg, VA (rivalry)	L 21–38	4,173	
November 22	1:30 p.m.	at Charleston Southern	Buccaneer Field; North Charleston, SC	W 48–14	1,831	
*Non-conference game; ^{†}Homecoming; All times are in Eastern time
