= 2003 Stephen F. Austin Lumberjacks football team =

American college football season

2003 Stephen F. Austin Lumberjacks football
- Conference: Southland Conference
- Record: 7–4 (4–1 Southland)
- Head coach: Mike Santiago (5th season)
- Defensive coordinator: Kim Dameron (3rd season)
- Home stadium: Homer Bryce Stadium

2003 Southland Conference football standings
	Conf.			Overall
Team	W		L	W		L
No. 8 McNeese State $^	5	–	0	10	–	2
Stephen F. Austin	4	–	1	7	–	4
Northwestern State	2	–	3	7	–	5
Texas State	2	–	3	5	–	7
Sam Houston State	2	–	3	3	–	8
Nicholls State†	0	–	5	0	–	11
$ – Conference champion; ^ – NCAA Division I-AA playoff participant; † – Nicholls State forfeited 5 wins, including 3 conference victories.; Rankings from The Sports Network poll

The 2003 Stephen F. Austin Lumberjacks football team represented Stephen F. Austin State University as a member of the Southland Conference during the 2003 NCAA Division I-AA football season. Led by fifth-year head coach Mike Santiago, the Lumberjacks compiled an overall record of 7–4 with a mark of 4–1 in conference play, placing in second place in the Southland. Stephen F. Austin played home games at Homer Bryce Stadium in Nacogdoches, Texas.

== Schedule ==
Date	Time	Opponent	Site	Result	Attendance	Source
September 6	7:00 p.m.	at Louisiana–Monroe*	Malone Stadium; Monroe, LA	W 23–21	15,056	
September 13	8:00 p.m.	at Southern Utah*	Eccles Coliseum; Cedar City, UT	L 21–22	6,921	
September 18	6:30 p.m.	Northern Iowa*	Homer Bryce Stadium; Nacogdoches, TX	L 24–38	7,841	
September 27	7:00 p.m.	Alcorn State*	Homer Bryce Stadium; Nacogdoches, TX	W 60–7	10,160	
October 4	7:00 p.m.	Portland State*	Homer Bryce Stadium; Nacogdoches, TX	L 13–21	5,147	
October 9	6:00 p.m.	at FIU*	FIU Stadium; Miami, FL	W 35–13	5,299	
October 16	7:00 p.m.	at Sam Houston State	Bowers Stadium; Huntsville, TX (Battle of the Piney Woods)	W 34–31	10,131	
October 25	4:00 p.m.	Texas State	Homer Bryce Stadium; Nacogdoches, TX	W 44–27	10,183	
November 8	7:00 p.m.	at No. 1 McNeese State	Cowboy Stadium; Lake Charles, LA	L 17–20	15,417	
November 15	4:00 p.m.	Nicholls State	Homer Bryce Stadium; Nacogdoches, TX	W 28–16	4,828	
November 22	3:00 p.m.	at Northwestern State	Harry Turpin Stadium; Natchitoches, LA (Chief Caddo)	W 44–14	7,701	
*Non-conference game; Rankings from The Sports Network Poll released prior to the game; All times are in Central time
