= Rayford Petty =

American football player and coach

Playing career
- 1975–1976: Chowan
- 1977–1978: Elon
- Position: Linebacker

Coaching career (HC unless noted)
- 1982–1987: North Carolina A&T (DB)
- 1988: Southern (DB)
- 1989: Southern (LB)
- 1990–1991: Forestville HS (MD)
- 1992–1999: Howard (assistant)
- 2000–2001: Norfolk State (DC/DB)
- 2002–2006: Howard
- 2007–2010: Delaware State (DC)
- 2011–2012: Howard (DC)
- 2013: Howard (interim HC / DC)
- 2014–2016: Howard (DC)

Head coaching record
- Overall: 31–36 (college)

Rayford Tilman Petty is an American former college football player and coach. He served as head football coach at Howard University from 2002 to 2006, and again in an interim capacity in 2013, compiling an overall record of 31–36. His career also includes positions as an assistant coach at North Carolina A&T University, Southern University, Norfolk State University and Delaware State University. Petty played as a linebacker at Elon College—now known as Elon University—during the late 1970s.

== Head coaching record ==
Year	Team	Overall	Conference	Standing	Bowl/playoffs
Howard Bison (Mid-Eastern Athletic Conference) (2002–2006)
2002	Howard	6–5	4–4	T–5th	
2003	Howard	4–7	2–5	6th	
2004	Howard	6–5	3–4	T–5th	
2005	Howard	4–7	1–7	T–8th	
2006	Howard	5–6	4–4	T–5th	
Howard Bison (Mid-Eastern Athletic Conference) (2013)
2013	Howard (Note: Petty served as interim head coach after Gary Harrell took a personal leave of absence for the 2013 season.)	6–6	4–4	T–5th	
Howard:		31–36	18–28		
Total:		31–36			
