= 2003 Liberty Flames football team =

American college football season

2003 Liberty Flames football
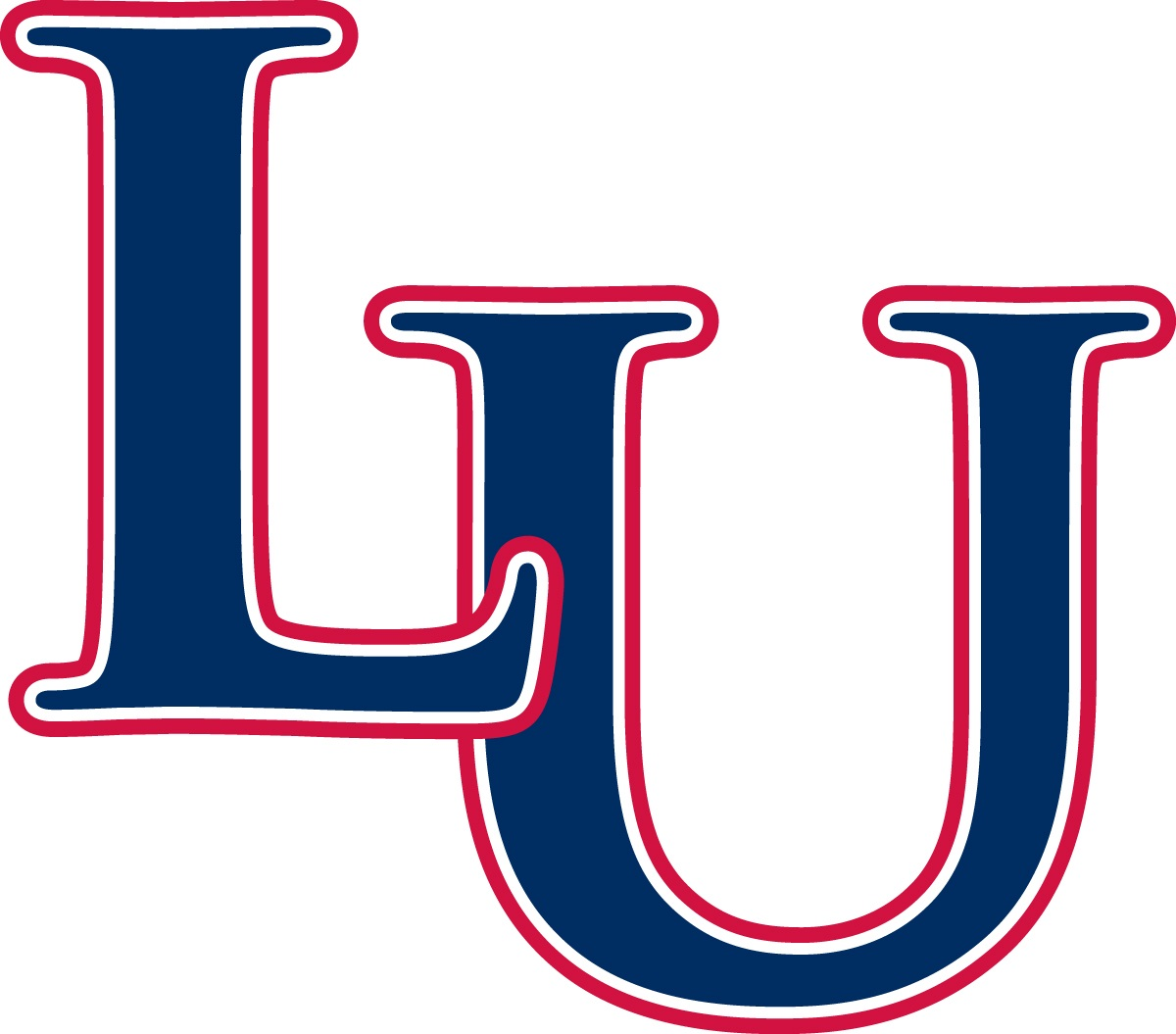
- Conference: Big South Conference
- Record: 6–6 (3–1 Big South)
- Head coach: Ken Karcher (4th season)
- Home stadium: Williams Stadium

2003 Big South Conference football standings
	Conf.			Overall
Team	W		L	W		L
Gardner–Webb $	4	–	0	8	–	4
Liberty	3	–	1	6	–	6
VMI	2	–	2	6	–	6
Coastal Carolina	1	–	3	6	–	5
Charleston Southern	0	–	4	1	–	11
$ – Conference champion

The 2003 Liberty Flames football team represented Liberty University a member of the Big South Conference during the 2003 NCAA Division I-AA football season. Led by fourth-year head coach Ken Karcher, the Flames compiled an overall record of 6–6 with a mark of 3–1 in conference play, placing in second in the Big South. Liberty played home games at Williams Stadium in Lynchburg, Virginia.

== Schedule ==
Date	Time	Opponent	Site	Result	Attendance	Source
August 30	6:00 pm	at James Madison*	Bridgeforth Stadium; Harrisonburg, VA	L 6–48	10,872	
September 6	7:00 pm	at Toledo*	Glass Bowl; Toledo, OH	L 3–49	22,878	
September 13	6:00 pm	at Bowling Green*	Doyt Perry Stadium; Bowling Green, OH	L 3–62	13,096	
September 20	1:30 pm	Kentucky Wesleyan*	Williams Stadium; Lynchburg, VA	W 47–7	6,269	
September 27	7:00 pm	Youngstown State*	Williams Stadium; Lynchburg, VA	L 3–24	8,569	
October 4	7:00 pm	VMI^{†}	Williams Stadium; Lynchburg, VA	W 31–28	12,273	
October 11	3:30 pm	at Gardner–Webb	Ernest W. Spangler Stadium; Boiling Springs, NC	L 17–27	3,612	
October 18	2:00 pm	at East Tennessee State*	Memorial Center; Johnson City, TN	L 23–33	7,730	
November 1	12:00 pm	at Charleston Southern	Buccaneer Field; North Charleston, SC	W 17–6	2,219	
November 8	1:30 pm	Norfolk State*	Williams Stadium; Lynchburg, VA	W 69–21	5,173	
November 15	1:30 pm	Coastal Carolina	Williams Stadium; Lynchburg, VA (rivalry)	W 38–21	4,173	
November 22	1:30 pm	Hofstra*	Williams Stadium; Lynchburg, VA	W 49–42 ^{OT}	2,569	
*Non-conference game; ^{†}Homecoming; All times are in Eastern time
