= 2003 Nicholls State Colonels football team =

American college football season

2003 Nicholls State Colonels football
- Conference: Southland Conference
- Record: 0–11, 5 wins forfeited (0–5 Southland, 3 wins forfeited)
- Head coach: Daryl Daye (5th season)
- Offensive coordinator: Jeff Richards (3rd season)
- Defensive coordinator: Jay Thomas (5th season)
- Home stadium: John L. Guidry Stadium

2003 Southland Conference football standings
	Conf.			Overall
Team	W		L	W		L
No. 8 McNeese State $^	5	–	0	10	–	2
Stephen F. Austin	4	–	1	7	–	4
Northwestern State	2	–	3	7	–	5
Texas State	2	–	3	5	–	7
Sam Houston State	2	–	3	3	–	8
Nicholls State†	0	–	5	0	–	11
$ – Conference champion; ^ – NCAA Division I-AA playoff participant; † – Nicholls State forfeited 5 wins, including 3 conference victories.; Rankings from The Sports Network poll

The 2003 Nicholls State Colonels football team represented Nicholls State University as a member of the Southland Conference during the 2003 NCAA Division I-AA football season. Led by Daryl Daye in his fifth and final season as head coach, the Colonels finished the season with an overall record of 5–6 and a mark of 3–2 in conference play, placing third in the Southland. Nicholls State played home games at John L. Guidry Stadium in Thibodaux, Louisiana.

In 2005, Nicholls State forfeited five victories, including three conference wins, from the 2003 season because an ineligible player had participated in those games. With the forfeits, the Colonels' record dropped to 0–11 overall and 0–5 in conference play, placing them last out of six teams in the Southland.

== Schedule ==
Date	Time	Opponent	Rank	Site	Result	Attendance	Source
August 28	6:00 p.m.	Bethel (TN)*	No. 23	John L. Guidry Stadium; Thibodaux, LA	L 70–0 (forfeit)	5,700	
September 6	6:00 p.m.	at South Florida*	No. 19	Raymond James Stadium; Tampa, FL	L 17–27	26,460	
September 13	8:05 p.m.	at Portland State*	No. 20	PGE Park; Portland, OR	L 37–44	5,627	
September 20	7:00 p.m.	at No. 11 (D-II) Texas A&M–Kingsville*		Javelina Stadium; Kingsville, TX	L 26–27	9,200	
September 27	4:00 p.m.	Texas Southern*		John L. Guidry Stadium; Thibodaux, LA	L 64–5 (forfeit)	8,200	
October 11	3:00 p.m.	at Florida Atlantic*		Lockhart Stadium; Boca Raton, FL	L 23–31	3,302	
October 25	2:30 p.m.	at No. 18 Northwestern State		Harry Turpin Stadium; Natchitoches, LA (NSU Challenge)	L 40–30 (forfeit)	10,178	
November 1	6:00 p.m.	Sam Houston State		John L. Guidry Stadium; Thibodaux, LA	L 37–12 (forfeit)	6,372	
November 6	7:00 p.m.	Texas State		John L. Guidry Stadium; Thibodaux, LA (Battle for the Paddle)	L 31–13 (forfeit)	7,314	
November 15	4:00 p.m.	at Stephen F. Austin		Homer Bryce Stadium; Nacogdoches, TX	L 16–28	4,828	
November 22	6:00 p.m.	No. 1 McNeese State		John L. Guidry Stadium; Thibodaux, LA	L 28–63	10,650	
*Non-conference game; Rankings from The Sports Network Poll released prior to the game; All times are in Central time
