= 2003 Arkansas–Pine Bluff Golden Lions football team =

American college football season

2003 Arkansas–Pine Bluff Golden Lions football
- Conference: Southwestern Athletic Conference
- West Division
- Record: 4–7 (3–4 SWAC)
- Head coach: Lee Hardman (11th season)
- Home stadium: Golden Lion Stadium

2003 Southwestern Athletic Conference football standings
	Conf.			Overall
Team	W		L	W		L
East Division
Alabama State xy	5	–	2	8	–	5
Alcorn State x	5	–	2	7	–	5
Alabama A&M	4	–	3	8	–	4
Jackson State	2	–	5	2	–	10
Mississippi Valley State	1	–	6	2	–	9
West Division
No. 13 Southern xy$	6	–	1	12	–	1
No. 17 Grambling State x	6	–	1	9	–	3
Texas Southern	3	–	4	5	–	6
Arkansas–Pine Bluff	3	–	4	4	–	7
Prairie View A&M	0	–	7	1	–	10
Championship: Southern 20, Alabama State 9
$ – Conference champion; x – Division champion/co-champions; Rankings from The Sports Network Poll

The 2003 Arkansas–Pine Bluff Golden Lions football team represented the University of Arkansas at Pine Bluff as a member of the Southwestern Athletic Conference (SWAC) during the 2003 NCAA Division I-AA football season. Led by eleventh-year head coach Lee Hardman, the Golden Lions compiled an overall record of 4–7, with a mark of 3–4 in conference play, and finished tied for third in the SWAC West Division.

== Schedule ==
Date	Opponent	Site	Result	Attendance	Source
August 30	Alcorn State	Golden Lion Stadium; Pine Bluff, AR	L 10–37		
September 6	Mississippi Valley State	Golden Lion Stadium; Pine Bluff, AR	W 27–7		
September 11	vs. Central Arkansas*	War Memorial Stadium; Little Rock, AR	L 28–42	13,274	
September 20	Alabama State	Golden Lion Stadium; Pine Bluff, AR	L 22–24	2,700	
September 27	vs. Kentucky State*	Edward Jones Dome; St. Louis, MO (Gateway Classic)	W 36–9	37,400	
October 4	at No. 22 Southern	A. W. Mumford Stadium; Baton Rouge, LA	L 7–53		
October 11	Texas Southern	Golden Lion Stadium; Pine Bluff, AR	L 6–7		
October 17	No. 16 Grambling State	Golden Lion Stadium; Pine Bluff, AR	L 16–41		
November 1	at Jackson State	Mississippi Veterans Memorial Stadium; Jackson, MS	W 16–14	20,500	
November 8	at Prairie View A&M	Reliant Astrodome; Houston, TX	W 43–7		
November 22	at Alabama A&M	Louis Crews Stadium; Normal, AL	L 0–50		
*Non-conference game; Rankings from The Sports Network Poll released prior to the game
