= 2003 Tennessee State Tigers football team =

American college football season

2003 Tennessee State Tigers football
- Conference: Ohio Valley Conference
- Record: 7–5 (5–3 OVC)
- Head coach: James Reese (4th season)
- Defensive coordinator: Rod Reed (1st season)
- Home stadium: The Coliseum

2003 Ohio Valley Conference football standings
	Conf.			Overall
Team	W		L	W		L
No. 18 Jacksonville State $^	7	–	1	8	–	4
Eastern Kentucky	6	–	2	7	–	5
Samford	5	–	3	7	–	4
Tennessee State	5	–	3	7	–	5
Southeast Missouri State	5	–	3	5	–	7
Murray State	3	–	5	4	–	8
Eastern Illinois	3	–	5	4	–	8
Tennessee Tech	1	–	7	2	–	9
Tennessee–Martin	1	–	7	2	–	10
$ – Conference champion; ^ – NCAA Division I-AA playoff participant; Rankings from The Sports Network poll

The 2003 Tennessee State Tigers football team represented Tennessee State University as a member of the Ohio Valley Conference (OVC) during the 2003 NCAA Division I-AA football season. Led by fourth-year head coach James Reese, the Tigers compiled an overall record of 7–5, with a conference record of 5–3, and finished tied for third in the OVC.

== Schedule ==
Date	Opponent	Site	Result	Attendance	Source
August 30	South Carolina State*	The Coliseum; Nashville, TN (John Merritt Classic)	W 37–20	18,124	
September 6	at Alabama A&M*	Louis Crews Stadium; Huntsville, AL	L 24–31		
September 13	vs. Jackson State*	Liberty Bowl Memorial Stadium; Memphis, TN (Southern Heritage Classic)	W 44–14	52,603	
September 20	vs. Florida A&M*	Georgia Dome; Atlanta, GA (Atlanta Football Classic)	L 7–10	70,185	
September 27	Tennessee–Martin	The Coliseum; Nashville, TN	W 41–10		
October 11	at Tennessee Tech	Tucker Stadium; Cookeville, TN	W 27–23	8,127	
October 18	Jacksonville State	The Coliseum; Nashville, TN	L 7–34	8,023	
October 25	at Samford	Seibert Stadium; Homewood, AL	W 29–24	10,360	
November 1	Eastern Illinois^{†}	The Coliseum; Nashville, TN	W 24–14	25,037	
November 8	at Southeast Missouri State	Houck Stadium; Cape Girardeau, MO	L 35–52		
November 15	Eastern Kentucky	The Coliseum; Nashville, TN	L 38–43		
November 22	at Murray State	Roy Stewart Stadium; Murray, KY	W 35–10	2,814	
*Non-conference game; ^{†}Homecoming
