= 2003 Jacksonville Dolphins football team =

American college football team

2003 Jacksonville Dolphins football
- Conference: Pioneer Football League
- South Division
- Record: 4–6 (1–2 PFL)
- Head coach: Steve Gilbert (6th season)
- Defensive coordinator: Shap Boyd (4th season)
- Home stadium: D. B. Milne Field

2003 Pioneer Football League standings
	Conf.			Overall
Team	W		L	W		L
North Division
Valparaiso xy$	3	–	1	8	–	4
San Diego x	3	–	1	8	–	2
Dayton	2	–	2	9	–	2
Drake	1	–	3	6	–	6
Butler	1	–	3	2	–	9
South Division
Morehead State xy	3	–	0	8	–	3
Jacksonville	1	–	2	4	–	6
Austin Peay	1	–	2	4	–	7
Davidson	1	–	2	3	–	8
Championship: Valparaiso 54, Morehead State 42
$ – Conference champion; x – Division champion/co-champions; y – Championship game participant

The 2003 Jacksonville Dolphins football team represented Jacksonville University as a member of the South Division of the Pioneer Football League (PFL) during the 2003 NCAA Division I-AA football season. Led by sixth-year head coach Steve Gilbert, the Dolphins compiled an overall record of 4–6 with a mark of 1–2 conference play, and tied for second in the PFL's South Division. Jacksonville played home games at D. B. Milne Field in Jacksonville, Florida.

== Schedule ==
Date	Time	Opponent	Site	Result	Attendance	Source
September 6		at Lenoir–Rhyne*	Moretz Stadium; Hickory, NC	L 0–24	4,946	
September 13		Wingate*	D. B. Milne Field; Jacksonville, FL	W 42–38	1,687	
September 20	12:30 p.m.	Coastal Carolina*	D. B. Milne Field; Jacksonville, FL	W 14–9	1,516	
September 27		Valparaiso*	D. B. Milne Field; Jacksonville, FL	W 34–27	1,438	
October 4		at Drake*	Drake Stadium; Des Moines, IA	L 34–40	6,218	
October 11		Davidson	D. B. Milne Field; Jacksonville, FL	L 29–37	1,042	
October 18		at Austin Peay	Governors Stadium; Clarksville, TN	W 30–0	1,538	
October 25		Morehead State	D. B. Milne Field; Jacksonville, FL	L 16–20	2,918	
October 30		at FIU*	FIU Stadium; Miami, FL	L 12–55	3,512	
November 8	5:00 p.m.	at Southeastern Louisiana*	Strawberry Stadium; Hammond, LA	L 23–43	9,758	
November 15		Webber International (FL)*	D. B. Milne Field; Jacksonville, FL	W 34–14	3,089	
*Non-conference game; All times are in Eastern time
