= 2003 Grambling State Tigers football team =

American college football season

2003 Grambling State Tigers football
- Conference: Southwestern Athletic Conference
- West Division

Ranking
- Sports Network: No. 17
- Record: 9–3 (6–1 SWAC)
- Head coach: Doug Williams (6th season)
- Offensive coordinator: Melvin Spears (6th season)
- Defensive coordinator: Heishma Northern (1st season)
- Home stadium: Eddie G. Robinson Memorial Stadium

2003 Southwestern Athletic Conference football standings
	Conf.			Overall
Team	W		L	W		L
East Division
Alabama State xy	5	–	2	8	–	5
Alcorn State x	5	–	2	7	–	5
Alabama A&M	4	–	3	8	–	4
Jackson State	2	–	5	2	–	10
Mississippi Valley State	1	–	6	2	–	9
West Division
No. 13 Southern xy$	6	–	1	12	–	1
No. 17 Grambling State x	6	–	1	9	–	3
Texas Southern	3	–	4	5	–	6
Arkansas–Pine Bluff	3	–	4	4	–	7
Prairie View A&M	0	–	7	1	–	10
Championship: Southern 20, Alabama State 9
$ – Conference champion; x – Division champion/co-champions; Rankings from The Sports Network Poll

The 2003 Grambling State Tigers football team represented Grambling State University as a member of the Southwestern Athletic Conference (SWAC) during the 2003 NCAA Division I-AA football season. Led by sixth-year head coach Doug Williams, the Tigers compiled an overall record of 9–3 and a mark of 6–1 in conference play, and finished as co-champion of the SWAC West Division.

== Schedule ==
Date	Opponent	Rank	Site	Result	Attendance	Source
August 23	at San Jose State*	No. 7	Spartan Stadium; San Jose, CA (Literacy Classic)	L 0–29	31,681	
September 6	at Alcorn State	No. 15	Jack Spinks Stadium; Lorman, MS	W 40–28	28,500	
September 13	Alabama A&M	No. 14	Independence Stadium; Shreveport, LA	W 45–14	6,962	
September 20	No. 1 McNeese State*	No. 13	Eddie G. Robinson Memorial Stadium; Grambling, LA	L 20–31	17,485	
October 4	vs. Prairie View A&M	No. 18	Cotton Bowl; Dallas, TX (rivalry)	W 65–7	55,432	
October 11	Mississippi Valley State	No. 16	Eddie G. Robinson Memorial Stadium; Grambling, LA	W 45–6	6,397	
October 17	at Arkansas–Pine Bluff	No. 16	Golden Lion Stadium; Pine Bluff, AR	W 41–16		
October 25	at Jackson State	No. 15	Mississippi Veterans Memorial Stadium; Jackson, MS	W 24–17	5,000	
November 1	Texas Southern^{†}	No. 14	Eddie G. Robinson Memorial Stadium; Grambling, LA	W 48–15	21,065	
November 8	at Alabama State	No. 13	Cramton Bowl; Montgomery, AL	W 37–34	8,124	
November 15	Savannah State*	No. 12	Eddie G. Robinson Memorial Stadium; Grambling, LA	W 33–17	3,001	
November 29	vs. No. 15 Southern	No. 12	Louisiana Superdome; New Orleans, LA (Bayou Classic)	L 41–44	70,151	
*Non-conference game; ^{†}Homecoming; Rankings from The Sports Network Poll released prior to the game
