= 2003 Eastern Illinois Panthers football team =

American college football season

2003 Eastern Illinois Panthers football
- Conference: Ohio Valley Conference
- Record: 4–8 (3–5 OVC)
- Head coach: Bob Spoo (17th season)
- Defensive coordinator: Roc Bellantoni (2nd season)
- Home stadium: O'Brien Stadium

2003 Ohio Valley Conference football standings
	Conf.			Overall
Team	W		L	W		L
No. 18 Jacksonville State $^	7	–	1	8	–	4
Eastern Kentucky	6	–	2	7	–	5
Samford	5	–	3	7	–	4
Tennessee State	5	–	3	7	–	5
Southeast Missouri State	5	–	3	5	–	7
Murray State	3	–	5	4	–	8
Eastern Illinois	3	–	5	4	–	8
Tennessee Tech	1	–	7	2	–	9
Tennessee–Martin	1	–	7	2	–	10
$ – Conference champion; ^ – NCAA Division I-AA playoff participant; Rankings from The Sports Network poll

The 2003 Eastern Illinois Panthers represented Eastern Illinois University as a member of the Ohio Valley Conference (OVC) during the 2003 NCAA Division I-AA football season. Led by 17th-year head coach Bob Spoo, the Panthers compiled an overall record of 4–8 with a mark of 3–5 in conference play, tying for sixth place in the OVC.

== Schedule ==
Date	Time	Opponent	Rank	Site	Result	Attendance	Source
September 6		California (PA)*	No. 17	O'Brien Stadium; Charleston, IL	W 27–0		
September 13	1:00 p.m.	at Missouri*	No. 15	Faurot Field; Columbia, MO	L 0–37	49,440	
September 20		Illinois State*	No. 19	O'Brien Stadium; Charleston, IL (rivalry)	L 14–21	6,318	
September 27		at Indiana State*		Memorial Stadium; Terre Haute, IN	L 7–23		
October 4		at Southeast Missouri State		Houck Stadium; Cape Girardeau, MO	L 17–30		
October 11		Eastern Kentucky		O'Brien Stadium; Charleston, IL	L 0–41		
October 18		at Murray State		Roy Stewart Stadium; Murray, KY	W 27–17		
October 25		Tennessee–Martin		O'Brien Stadium; Charleston, IL	W 29–12		
November 1		at Tennessee State		The Coliseum; Nashville, TN	L 14–24	25,037	
November 8		Tennessee Tech		O'Brien Stadium; Charleston, IL	W 37–10		
November 15	4:00 p.m.	at No. 21 Jacksonville State		Paul Snow Stadium; Jacksonville, AL	L 24–36	8,674	
November 22	1:30 p.m.	Samford		O'Brien Stadium; Charleston, IL	L 14–17	1,024	
*Non-conference game; Rankings from The Sports Network Poll released prior to the game; All times are in Central time

== Roster ==
2003 Eastern Illinois Panthers football team roster
Players
Coaches
Offense

Pos.	#	Name	Class
QB	16	Andy Vincent	Jr
G	64	Ryan Schulz	Fr
C	65	Steve Sobolewski	Fr

Defense

Pos.	#	Name	Class
LB	6	Fred Miller	Sr
DE	91	Mike Morley	Fr

Special teams

Pos.	#	Name	Class
P	33	Tom Schofield	So

Head coach

- Bob Spoo

Coordinators/assistant coaches

Legend

- (C) Team captain
- (S) Suspended
- (I) Ineligible
- Injured
- Redshirt

Roster
