= 2003 Southeastern Louisiana Lions football team =

American college football season

2003 Southeastern Louisiana Lions football
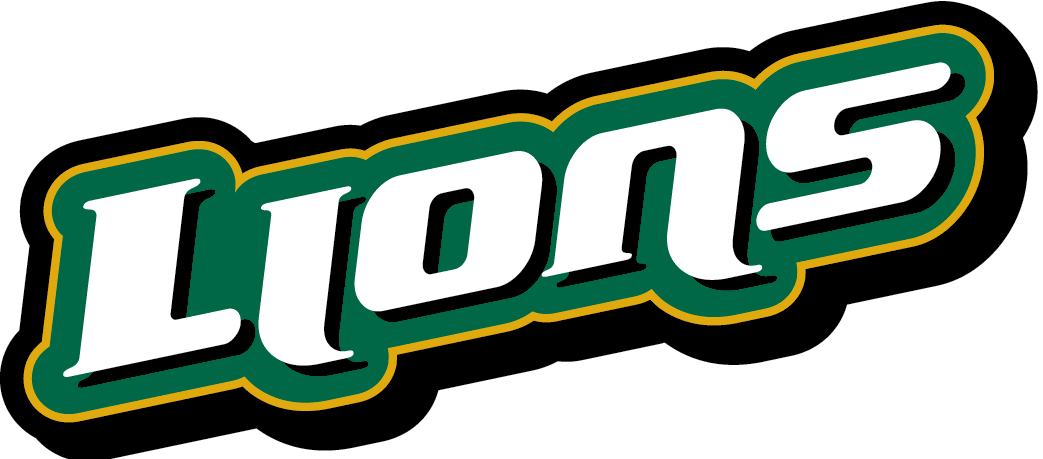
- Conference: Independent
- Record: 5–7
- Head coach: Hal Mumme (1st season)
- Offensive coordinator: Gary Goff (1st season)
- Offensive scheme: Air raid
- Defensive coordinator: Woody Widenhofer (1st season)
- Base defense: 4–3
- Home stadium: Strawberry Stadium

2003 NCAA Division I-AA independents football standings
	Conf.			Overall
Team	W		L	W		L
No. 4 Florida Atlantic ^		–		11	–	3
Cal Poly		–		7	–	4
Southeastern Louisiana		–		5	–	7
Southern Utah		–		4	–	7
Saint Mary's		–		1	–	11
FIU		–		0	–	10
Savannah State		–		0	–	12
^ – NCAA Division I-AA playoff participant; Record adjusted for 2 vacated wins by FIU; Rankings from The Sports Network poll

The 2003 Southeastern Louisiana Lions football team represented Southeastern Louisiana University during the 2003 NCAA Division I-AA football season. Led by first-year head coach Hal Mumme, the Lions compiled an overall record of 5–7. Southeastern Louisiana played home games at Strawberry Stadium in Hammond, Louisiana.

This season marked the return of football at Southeastern Louisiana after a 17-year hiatus of play going back to their 1985 season.

== Schedule ==
Date	Time	Opponent	Site	TV	Result	Attendance	Source
August 30	7:00 p.m.	Arkansas–Monticello	Strawberry Stadium; Hammond, LA		W 22–17	9,708	
September 4	7:00 p.m.	Lambuth	Strawberry Stadium; Hammond, LA		W 22–10	9,708	
September 13	7:00 p.m.	at Henderson State	Carpenter–Haygood Stadium; Arkadelphia, AR		L 35–41	4,856	
September 20	6:00 p.m.	at Troy State	Movie Gallery Stadium; Troy, AL	Cox Sports	L 0–28	19,889	
September 27	6:00 p.m.	at Texas State	Bobcat Stadium; San Marcos, TX		L 17–38	11,762	
October 4	7:00 p.m.	No. 1 McNeese State	Strawberry Stadium; Hammond, LA		L 20–58	9,758	
October 11	6:00 p.m.	at Northwestern State	Harry Turpin Stadium; Natchitoches, LA (rivalry)		L 27–87	10,192	
October 18	4:00 p.m.	Webber International (FL)	Strawberry Stadium; Hammond, LA		W 68–10	9,013	
October 25	1:00 p.m.	at Saint Mary's	Saint Mary's Stadium; Moraga, CA		L 27–33	1,431	
November 1	2:00 p.m.	at Alcorn State	Jack Spinks Stadium; Lorman, MS		L 24–27	4,000	
November 8	4:00 p.m.	Jacksonville	Strawberry Stadium; Hammond, LA		W 43–23	9,758	
November 15	4:00 p.m.	Prairie View A&M	Strawberry Stadium; Hammond, LA		W 64–10	8,242	
Rankings from The Sports Network Poll released prior to the game; All times are in Central time
