= 2003 Florida Atlantic Owls football team =

American college football season

2003 Florida Atlantic Owls football

NCAA Division I-AA Semifinal, L 24–36 vs. Colgate
- Conference: Independent

Ranking
- Sports Network: No. 4
- Record: 11–3
- Head coach: Howard Schnellenberger (3rd season)
- Offensive coordinator: Larry Seiple (3rd season)
- Offensive scheme: Pro-style
- Defensive coordinator: Kirk Hoza (3rd season)
- Base defense: 4–3
- Home stadium: Lockhart Stadium

2003 NCAA Division I-AA independents football standings
	Conf.			Overall
Team	W		L	W		L
No. 4 Florida Atlantic ^		–		11	–	3
Cal Poly		–		7	–	4
Southeastern Louisiana		–		5	–	7
Southern Utah		–		4	–	7
Saint Mary's		–		1	–	11
FIU		–		0	–	10
Savannah State		–		0	–	12
^ – NCAA Division I-AA playoff participant; Record adjusted for 2 vacated wins by FIU; Rankings from The Sports Network poll

The 2003 Florida Atlantic Owls football team represented Florida Atlantic University (FAU) as an independent during the 2003 NCAA Division I-AA football season. Led by third-year head coach Howard Schnellenberger, the Owls compiled a record of 11–3. Florida Atlantic advanced to the NCAA Division I-AA Football Championship playoffs, where the Owls defeated Bethune–Cookman in the first round and Northern Arizona in the quarterfinals before falling to the eventual national runner-up, Colgate, in the semifinals. Florida Atlantic played home games at Lockhart Stadium in Fort Lauderdale, Florida.

== Schedule ==
Date	Time	Opponent	Rank	Site	TV	Result	Attendance	Source
August 28	8:00 p.m.	at Middle Tennessee		Johnny "Red" Floyd Stadium; Murfreesboro, TN		W 20–19	23,261	
September 6	4:00 p.m.	No. 2 (D-II) Valdosta State		Lockhart Stadium; Fort Lauderdale, FL		L 17–45	4,758	
September 13	6:00 p.m.	at UCF		Florida Citrus Bowl; Orlando, FL		L 29–33	25,144	
September 20	7:00 p.m.	at Youngstown State		Stambaugh Stadium; Youngstown, OH		W 13–6	16,891	
September 27	2:30 p.m.	at No. 23 Illinois State		Hancock Stadium; Normal, IL		W 28–10	6,837	
October 4	4:00 p.m.	Texas State		Lockhart Stadium; Fort Lauderdale, FL		W 27–14	4,358	
October 11	4:00 p.m.	Nicholls State		Lockhart Stadium; Fort Lauderdale, FL		W 31–23	3,302	
October 18	4:00 p.m.	Northern Colorado	No. 23	Lockhart Stadium; Fort Lauderdale, FL		W 21–19	4,255	
November 1	4:00 p.m.	Gardner–Webb	No. 17	Lockhart Stadium; Fort Lauderdale, FL		W 31–26	5,263	
November 15	4:00 p.m.	Siena	No. 15	Lockhart Stadium; Fort Lauderdale, FL		W 51–3	6,159	
November 22	3:30 p.m.	at FIU	No. 15	FIU Stadium; Miami, FL (Shula Bowl)		W 32–23	9,288	
November 29	1:00 p.m.	at No. 14 Bethune–Cookman	No. 13	Municipal Stadium; Daytona Beach, FL (NCAA Division I-AA First Round)		W 32–24	8,468	
December 6	8:05 p.m.	at No. 16 Northern Arizona	No. 13	Walkup Skydome; Flagstaff, AZ (NCAA Division I-AA Quarterfinal)		W 48–25	9,314	
December 13	1:00 p.m.	No. 6 Colgate	No. 13	Lockhart Stadium; Fort Lauderdale, FL (NCAA Division I-AA Semifinal)	ESPN2	L 24–36	12,857	
Rankings from The Sports Network Poll released prior to the game; All times are in Eastern time

== Awards and honors ==
=== Mid-season awards and honors ===
- Week 4 Independent Player of the Week: Roosevelt Bynes (WR, Jr.)
- Week 8 Independent Player of the Week: Willie Hughley (CB, So.)

=== All-Independent honors ===
- First Team All-Independent:
  - Jared Allen (QB, Jr.)
  - Roosevelt Bynes (WR, Jr.)
  - Anthony Crissinger-Hill (WR, Jr.)
  - Quentin Swain (LB, Sr.)
- Second Team All-Independent:
  - Anthony Jackson (RB, Jr.)
  - Ken Campos (OL, Sr.)
  - George Guffey (OL, Sr.)
  - Dave Richards (OL, Sr.)
  - Chris Laskowski (LB, Jr.)
  - Willie Hughley (CB, So.)

=== All-South Region honors ===
- First Team All-South Region:
  - Roosevelt Bynes (WR, Jr.)
  - Anthony Crissinger-Hill (WR, Jr.)
  - Willie Hughley (CB, So.)
- Second Team All-South Region:
  - Jared Allen (QB, Jr.)
  - George Guffey (OL, Sr.)
  - Dave Richards (OL, Sr.)
  - Chris Laskowski (LB, Jr.)
- Third Team All-South Region:
  - Yrvens Guerrier (DL, Sr.)
  - Mike Myers (K, Jr.)
