= James Reese (American football) =

American football player and coach (born 1968)

Biographical details
- Born: December 5, 1968 (age 57); Nashville, Tennessee, U.S.
- Education: Tennessee State

Playing career
- 1988–1990: Tennessee State
- Position: Fullback

Coaching career (HC unless noted)
- 1991: Tennessee State (GA)
- 1992–1993: Tennessee State (RB)
- 1994–1998: Tennessee State (RB/RC)
- 1999: Tennessee State (OC/QB/RC)
- 2000–2004: Tennessee State

Head coaching record
- Overall: 24–33

James L. Reese III (born December 5, 1968) is an American former football coach. He was the 19th head football coach for at Tennessee State University in Nashville, Tennessee, serving for five seasons, from 2000 to 2004, and compiling a record of 24–33 (.421).

== Head coaching record ==
Year	Team	Overall	Conference	Standing	Bowl/playoffs
Tennessee State Tigers (Ohio Valley Conference) (2000–2004)
2000	Tennessee State	3–8	2–5	6th	
2001	Tennessee State	8–3	3–3	4th	
2002	Tennessee State	2–10	1–5	6th	
2003	Tennessee State	7–5	5–3	T–3rd	
2004	Tennessee State	4–7	2–5	8th	
Tennessee State:		24–33	13–21		
Total:		24–33			
