= 2003 McNeese State Cowboys football team =

American college football season

2003 McNeese State Cowboys football

Southland champion

NCAA Division I-AA First Round, L 3–35 vs. Northern Arizona
- Conference: Southland Conference

Ranking
- Sports Network: No. 8
- Record: 10–2 (5–0 Southland)
- Head coach: Tommy Tate (4th season)
- Offensive coordinator: Matt Viator (4th season)
- Defensive coordinator: Lance Guidry (2nd season)
- Home stadium: Cowboy Stadium

2003 Southland Conference football standings
	Conf.			Overall
Team	W		L	W		L
No. 8 McNeese State $^	5	–	0	10	–	2
Stephen F. Austin	4	–	1	7	–	4
Northwestern State	2	–	3	7	–	5
Texas State	2	–	3	5	–	7
Sam Houston State	2	–	3	3	–	8
Nicholls State†	0	–	5	0	–	11
$ – Conference champion; ^ – NCAA Division I-AA playoff participant; † – Nicholls State forfeited 5 wins, including 3 conference victories.; Rankings from The Sports Network poll

The 2003 McNeese State Cowboys football team was an American football team that represented McNeese State University as a member of the Southland Conference (Southland) during the 2003 NCAA Division I-AA football season. In their fourth year under head coach Tommy Tate, the team compiled an overall record of 10–2, with a mark of 5–0 in conference play, and finished as champion in the Southland. The Cowboys advanced to the NCAA Division I-AA Football Championship playoffs and lost to Northern Arizona in the first round.

== Schedule ==
Date	Opponent	Rank	Site	Result	Attendance	Source
August 30	Henderson State*	No. 1	Cowboy Stadium; Lake Charles, LA	W 42–0	14,956	
September 6	at No. 7 (I-A) Kansas State*	No. 1	KSU Stadium; Manhattan, KS	L 14–55	44,544	
September 13	No. 2 Georgia Southern*	No. 3	Cowboy Stadium; Lake Charles, LA	W 34–15	17,189	
September 20	at No. 13 Grambling State*	No. 1	Eddie G. Robinson Memorial Stadium; Grambling, LA	W 31–20	17,485	
October 4	at Southeastern Louisiana*	No. 1	Strawberry Stadium; Hammond, LA	W 58–20	9,758	
October 18	at Southern Utah*	No. 1	Eccles Coliseum; Cedar City, UT	W 33–20	4,210	
October 25	Sam Houston State	No. 1	Cowboy Stadium; Lake Charles, LA	W 56–37	16,767	
October 30	at Texas State	No. 1	Bobcat Stadium; San Marcos, TX	W 38–28	8,889	
November 8	Stephen F. Austin	No. 1	Cowboy Stadium; Lake Charles, LA	W 20–17	15,417	
November 15	Northwestern State	No. 1	Cowboy Stadium; Lake Charles, LA (rivalry)	W 13–9	17,289	
November 22	at Nicholls State	No. 1	John L. Guidry Stadium; Thibodaux, LA	W 63–28	10,650	
November 29	No. 16 Northern Arizona*	No. 1	Cowboy Stadium; Lake Charles, LA (NCAA Division I-AA First Round)	L 3–35	14,300	
*Non-conference game; Rankings from The Sports Network Poll released prior to the game
