= 2003 Jackson State Tigers football team =

American college football season

2003 Jackson State Tigers football
- Conference: Southwestern Athletic Conference
- East Division
- Record: 2–10 (2–5 SWAC)
- Head coach: James Bell (1st season)
- Home stadium: Mississippi Veterans Memorial Stadium

2003 Southwestern Athletic Conference football standings
	Conf.			Overall
Team	W		L	W		L
East Division
Alabama State xy	5	–	2	8	–	5
Alcorn State x	5	–	2	7	–	5
Alabama A&M	4	–	3	8	–	4
Jackson State	2	–	5	2	–	10
Mississippi Valley State	1	–	6	2	–	9
West Division
No. 13 Southern xy$	6	–	1	12	–	1
No. 17 Grambling State x	6	–	1	9	–	3
Texas Southern	3	–	4	5	–	6
Arkansas–Pine Bluff	3	–	4	4	–	7
Prairie View A&M	0	–	7	1	–	10
Championship: Southern 20, Alabama State 9
$ – Conference champion; x – Division champion/co-champions; Rankings from The Sports Network Poll

The 2003 Jackson State Tigers football team represented Jackson State University as a member of the Southwestern Athletic Conference (SWAC) during the 2003 NCAA Division I-AA football season. Led by first-year head coach James Bell, the Tigers compiled an overall record of 2–10 and a mark of 2–5 in conference play, and finished fourth in the SWAC East Division.

== Schedule ==
Date	Opponent	Site	Result	Attendance	Source
August 30	at No. 22 Northwestern State*	Harry Turpin Stadium; Natchitoches, LA	L 7–23	12,320	
September 6	North Carolina A&T*	Mississippi Veterans Memorial Stadium; Jackson, MS	L 7–10 ^{OT}	11,157	
September 13	vs. Tennessee State*	Liberty Bowl Memorial Stadium; Memphis, TN (Southern Heritage Classic)	L 14–44	52,603	
September 20	at Texas Southern	Reliant Astrodome; Houston, TX	W 28–21		
September 27	at Mississippi Valley State	Rice–Totten Stadium; Itta Bena, MS	W 21–17	13,743	
October 4	vs. Florida A&M*	RCA Dome; Indianapolis, IN (Circle City Classic)	L 14–28	58,198	
October 11	Alabama State	Mississippi Veterans Memorial Stadium; Jackson, MS	L 20–27	7,528	
October 18	No. 17 Southern	Mississippi Veterans Memorial Stadium; Jackson, MS (rivalry)	L 20–30	46,794	
October 25	No. 15 Grambling State	Mississippi Veterans Memorial Stadium; Jackson, MS	L 17–24	5,000	
November 1	Arkansas–Pine Bluff^{†}	Mississippi Veterans Memorial Stadium; Jackson, MS	L 14–16	20,500	
November 8	at Alabama A&M	Louis Crews Stadium; Normal, AL	L 14–49		
November 22	Alcorn State	Mississippi Veterans Memorial Stadium; Jackson, MS (Capital City Classic)	L 25–49	45,000	
*Non-conference game; ^{†}Homecoming; Rankings from The Sports Network Poll released prior to the game
