= 2003 Gardner–Webb Runnin' Bulldogs football team =

American college football season

2003 Gardner–Webb Runnin' Bulldogs football

Big South champion
- Conference: Big South Conference
- Record: 8–4 (4–0 Big South)
- Head coach: Steve Patton (7th season)
- Home stadium: Ernest W. Spangler Stadium

2003 Big South Conference football standings
	Conf.			Overall
Team	W		L	W		L
Gardner–Webb $	4	–	0	8	–	4
Liberty	3	–	1	6	–	6
VMI	2	–	2	6	–	6
Coastal Carolina	1	–	3	6	–	5
Charleston Southern	0	–	4	1	–	11
$ – Conference champion

The 2003 Gardner–Webb Runnin' Bulldogs football team represented Gardner–Webb University as a member of the Big South Conference during the 2003 NCAA Division I-AA football season. Led by Steve Patton in his seventh-year as head coach, the Runnin' Bulldogs compiled an overall record of 8–4 with a mark of 4–0 in conference play, winning their second consecutive Big South championship. Gardner–Webb played home games at Ernest W. Spangler Stadium in Boiling Springs, North Carolina.

== Schedule ==
Date	Time	Opponent	Site	Result	Attendance	Source
August 30		Clark Atlanta*	Ernest W. Spangler Stadium; Boiling Springs, NC	W 45–0		
September 6		at No. 16 Montana State*	Bobcat Stadium; Bozeman, MT	L 3–38	11,187	
September 13		Webber International*	Ernest W. Spangler Stadium; Boiling Springs, NC	W 52–10		
September 20	6:00 pm	Chattanooga*	Ernest W. Spangler Stadium; Boiling Springs, NC	W 23–13	3,789	
September 27	2:00 pm	at No. 8 Furman*	Paladin Stadium; Greenville, SC	L 0–45	9,528	
October 4	7:00 pm	at Coastal Carolina	Brooks Stadium; Conway, SC	W 38–17	6,632	
October 11	3:30 pm	Liberty	Ernest W. Spangler Stadium; Boiling Springs, NC	W 27–17	3,612	
October 18	1:00 pm	at VMI	Alumni Memorial Field; Lexington, VA	W 37–25	4,732	
November 1	4:00 pm	at No. 17 Florida Atlantic*	Lockhart Stadium; Fort Lauderdale, FL	L 26–31	5,263	
November 8	1:30 pm	Charleston Southern	Ernest W. Spangler Stadium; Boiling Springs, NC	W 46–0	5,208	
November 15	1:30 pm	FIU*	Ernest W. Spangler Stadium; Boiling Springs, NC	W 22–19 ^{OT}	1,106	
November 22	2:00 pm	at Western Carolina*	E. J. Whitmire Stadium; Cullowhee, NC	L 16–39	8,028	
*Non-conference game; Rankings from The Sports Network Poll released prior to the game; All times are in Eastern time
