= 2003 Alabama State Hornets football team =

American college football season

2003 Alabama State Hornets football

SWAC East Division co-champion

SWAC Championship Game, L 9–20 vs. Southern
- Conference: Southwestern Athletic Conference
- East Division
- Record: 8–5 (5–2 SWAC)
- Head coach: Charles Coe (1st season)
- Offensive coordinator: Chris Kapilovic (1st season)
- Home stadium: Cramton Bowl

2003 Southwestern Athletic Conference football standings
	Conf.			Overall
Team	W		L	W		L
East Division
Alabama State xy	5	–	2	8	–	5
Alcorn State x	5	–	2	7	–	5
Alabama A&M	4	–	3	8	–	4
Jackson State	2	–	5	2	–	10
Mississippi Valley State	1	–	6	2	–	9
West Division
No. 13 Southern xy$	6	–	1	12	–	1
No. 17 Grambling State x	6	–	1	9	–	3
Texas Southern	3	–	4	5	–	6
Arkansas–Pine Bluff	3	–	4	4	–	7
Prairie View A&M	0	–	7	1	–	10
Championship: Southern 20, Alabama State 9
$ – Conference champion; x – Division champion/co-champions; Rankings from The Sports Network Poll

The 2003 Alabama State Hornets football team represented Alabama State University as a member of the Southwestern Athletic Conference (SWAC) during the 2003 NCAA Division I-AA football season. Led by first-year head coach Charles Coe, the Hornets compiled an overall record of 8–5, with a mark of 5–2 in conference play, finished as SWAC East Division co-champion, and lost to Southern in the SWAC Championship Game.

== Schedule ==
Date	Opponent	Site	Result	Attendance	Source
August 30	vs. Florida A&M*	Ford Field; Detroit, MI (Detroit Classic)	W 38–22	54,500	
September 6	vs. No. 8 Bethune–Cookman*	Ladd–Peebles Stadium; Mobile, AL (Gulf Coast Classic)	L 26–31		
September 13	Alcorn State	Cramton Bowl; Montgomery, AL	W 49–28	11,237	
September 20	at Arkansas–Pine Bluff	Golden Lion Stadium; Pine Bluff, AR	W 24–22	2,700	
September 27	at Southern	A. W. Mumford Stadium; Baton Rouge, LA	L 10–35	26,400	
October 11	at Jackson State	Mississippi Veterans Memorial Stadium; Jackson, MS	W 27–20	7,528	
October 18	Prairie View A&M	Cramton Bowl; Montgomery, AL	W 59–7	7,488	
October 25	vs. Alabama A&M	Legion Field; Birmingham, AL (Magic City Classic)	L 17–20		
November 8	No. 13 Grambling State	Cramton Bowl; Montgomery, AL	L 34–37	8,124	
November 15	at Mississippi Valley State	Rice–Totten Stadium; Itta Bena, MS	W 55–31		
November 22	at Texas Southern	Reliant Stadium; Houston, TX	W 38–26		
November 27	Tuskegee*	Cramton Bowl; Montgomery, AL (Turkey Day Classic)	W 48–28		
December 13	vs. No. 13 Southern	Legion Field; Birmingham, AL (SWAC Championship Game)	L 9–20	31,617	
*Non-conference game; Rankings from The Sports Network Poll released prior to the game
