= 2003 Texas State Bobcats football team =

American college football season

2003 Texas State Bobcats football
- Conference: Southland Conference
- Record: 5–7 (2–3 SLC)
- Head coach: Manny Matsakis (1st season)
- Offensive coordinator: Clancy Barone (1st season)
- Offensive scheme: Pro-style
- Defensive coordinator: Ron Roberts (1st season)
- Base defense: Multiple
- Home stadium: Bobcat Stadium

2003 Southland Conference football standings
	Conf.			Overall
Team	W		L	W		L
No. 8 McNeese State $^	5	–	0	10	–	2
Stephen F. Austin	4	–	1	7	–	4
Northwestern State	2	–	3	7	–	5
Texas State	2	–	3	5	–	7
Sam Houston State	2	–	3	3	–	8
Nicholls State†	0	–	5	0	–	11
$ – Conference champion; ^ – NCAA Division I-AA playoff participant; † – Nicholls State forfeited 5 wins, including 3 conference victories.; Rankings from The Sports Network poll

The 2003 Texas State Bobcats football team was an American football team that represented Texas State University–San Marcos (now known as Texas State University) during the 2003 NCAA Division I-AA football season as a member of the Southland Conference (SLC). In their first year under head coach Manny Matsakis, the team compiled an overall record of 5–7 with a mark of 2–3 in conference play.

== Schedule ==
Date	Opponent	Site	Result	Attendance	Source
August 30	at New Mexico*	University Stadium; Albuquerque, NM	L 8–72	35,311	
September 6	Angelo State*	Bobcat Stadium; San Marcos, TX	W 42–7	12,888	
September 13	at Tulsa*	Skelly Stadium; Tulsa, OK	L 15–41	35,805	
September 20	UC Davis*	Bobcat Stadium; San Marcos, TX	W 34–32	8,764	
September 27	Southeastern Louisiana*	Bobcat Stadium; San Marcos, TX	W 38–17	11,762	
October 4	at Florida Atlantic*	Lockhart Stadium; Fort Lauderdale, FL	L 14–27	4,358	
October 11	at Southern Utah*	Eccles Coliseum; Cedar City, UT	L 28–31	6,556	
October 18	No. 19 Northwestern State	Bobcat Stadium; San Marcos, TX	L 19–49	11,752	
October 25	at Stephen F. Austin	Homer Bryce Stadium; Nacogdoches, TX	L 27–44	10,183	
October 30	McNeese State	Bobcat Stadium; San Marcos, TX	L 28–38	8,889	
November 6	at Nicholls State	John L. Guidry Stadium; Thibodaux, LA (rivalry)	W 13–31 (forfeit win)	7,314	
November 22	Sam Houston State	Bobcat Stadium; San Marcos, TX (rivalry)	W 49–28	8,991	
*Non-conference game; Rankings from The Sports Network Poll released prior to the game
