= 2003 Samford Bulldogs football team =

American college football season

2003 Samford Bulldogs football
- Conference: Ohio Valley Conference
- Record: 7–4 (5–3 OVC)
- Head coach: Bill Gray (3rd season)
- Offensive coordinator: Doug Meacham (3rd season)
- Defensive coordinator: Mike O'Toole (4th season)
- Home stadium: Seibert Stadium

2003 Ohio Valley Conference football standings
	Conf.			Overall
Team	W		L	W		L
No. 18 Jacksonville State $^	7	–	1	8	–	4
Eastern Kentucky	6	–	2	7	–	5
Samford	5	–	3	7	–	4
Tennessee State	5	–	3	7	–	5
Southeast Missouri State	5	–	3	5	–	7
Murray State	3	–	5	4	–	8
Eastern Illinois	3	–	5	4	–	8
Tennessee Tech	1	–	7	2	–	9
Tennessee–Martin	1	–	7	2	–	10
$ – Conference champion; ^ – NCAA Division I-AA playoff participant; Rankings from The Sports Network poll

The 2003 Samford Bulldogs football team represented Samford University as a member of the Ohio Valley Conference (OVC) during the 2003 NCAA Division I-AA football season. Led by third-year head coach Bill Gray, the Bulldogs compiled an overall record of 7–4, with a mark of 5–3 in conference play, and finished tied for third in the OVC. The team played home games at Seibert Stadium in Homewood, Alabama.

== Schedule ==
Date	Time	Opponent	Site	Result	Attendance	Source
August 28	7:00 p.m.	at Chattanooga*	Finley Stadium; Chattanooga, TN	W 31–23	9,003	
September 4	7:00 p.m.	West Alabama*	Seibert Stadium; Homewood, AL	W 44–28	9,228	
September 20	4:00 p.m.	at San Diego State*	Qualcomm Stadium; San Diego, CA	L 17–37	20,967	
September 27	6:00 p.m.	Southeast Missouri State	Seibert Stadium; Homewood, AL	W 41–31	4,258	
October 4	5:30 p.m.	at Eastern Kentucky	Roy Kidd Stadium; Richmond, KY	L 10–13	10,600	
October 11	1:00 p.m.	Murray State	Seibert Stadium; Homewood, AL	W 35–6	3,140	
October 18	4:00 p.m.	at Tennessee–Martin	Graham Stadium; Martin, TN	W 57–22	1,313	
October 25	2:30 p.m.	Tennessee State^{†}	Seibert Stadium; Homewood, AL	L 24–29	10,360	
November 1	2:00 p.m.	at Tennessee Tech	Tucker Stadium; Cookeville, TN	W 42–24	8,819	
November 8	1:00 p.m.	Jacksonville State	Seibert Stadium; Homewood, AL (rivalry)	L 32–49	10,780	
November 22	1:30 p.m.	at Eastern Illinois	O'Brien Stadium; Charleston, IL	W 17–14	1,024	
*Non-conference game; ^{†}Homecoming; All times are in Central time
