= 2003 Hampton Pirates football team =

American college football season

2003 Hampton Pirates football
- Conference: Mid-Eastern Athletic Conference
- Record: 7–4 (5–2 MEAC)
- Head coach: Joe Taylor (12th season)
- Home stadium: Armstrong Stadium

2003 Mid-Eastern Athletic Conference football standings
	Conf.			Overall
Team	W		L	W		L
No. 16 North Carolina A&T $^	7	–	1	10	–	3
No. 15 Bethune–Cookman ^	6	–	2	9	–	3
South Carolina State	5	–	2	8	–	4
Hampton	5	–	2	7	–	4
Morgan State	4	–	3	6	–	5
Florida A&M	3	–	4	6	–	6
Howard	2	–	5	4	–	7
Delaware State	1	–	6	1	–	10
Norfolk State	0	–	8	1	–	11
$ – Conference champion; ^ – NCAA Division I-AA playoff participant; Rankings from The Sports Network poll

The 2003 Hampton Pirates football team represented Hampton University as a member of the Mid-Eastern Athletic Conference (MEAC) during the 2003 NCAA Division I-AA football season. Led by 12th-year head coach Joe Taylor, the Pirates compiled an overall record of 7–5, with a mark of 5–2 in conference play, and finished tied for third in the MEAC.

== Schedule ==
Date	Opponent	Rank	Site	Result	Attendance	Source
August 28	at No. 12 Villanova*		Villanova Stadium; Villanova, PA	L 6–41	7,707	
September 13	at Howard		William H. Greene Stadium; Washington, DC (rivalry)	W 17–14	10,500	
September 20	vs. Tuskegee*		Cleveland Browns Stadium; Cleveland, OH (Ohio Classic)	W 53–0	45,688	
September 27	vs. Morgan State		Giants Stadium; East Rutherford, NJ (New York Urban League Football Classic)	W 24–21 ^{OT}		
October 4	Delaware State		Armstrong Stadium; Hampton, VA	W 41–9	7,583	
October 18	at Norfolk State		William "Dick" Price Stadium; Norfolk, VA (rivalry)	W 52–0	13,127	
October 25	South Carolina State	No. 25	Armstrong Stadium; Hampton, VA	W 32–12		
November 1	Florida A&M	No. 21	Armstrong Stadium; Hampton, VA	L 23–34	3,572	
November 8	at No. 17 Bethune–Cookman	No. 25	Municipal Stadium; Daytona Beach, FL	L 27–30		
November 15	at No. 14 North Carolina A&T		Aggie Stadium; Greensboro, NC	L 28–38	18,765	
November 22	Savannah State*		Armstrong Stadium; Hampton, VA	W 48–13		
*Non-conference game; Rankings from The Sports Network Poll released prior to the game
