= 2003 South Carolina State Bulldogs football team =

American college football season

2003 South Carolina State Bulldogs football
- Conference: Mid-Eastern Athletic Conference
- Record: 8–4 (5–2 MEAC)
- Head coach: Oliver Pough (2nd season)
- Home stadium: Oliver C. Dawson Stadium

2003 Mid-Eastern Athletic Conference football standings
	Conf.			Overall
Team	W		L	W		L
No. 16 North Carolina A&T $^	7	–	1	10	–	3
No. 15 Bethune–Cookman ^	6	–	2	9	–	3
South Carolina State	5	–	2	8	–	4
Hampton	5	–	2	7	–	4
Morgan State	4	–	3	6	–	5
Florida A&M	3	–	4	6	–	6
Howard	2	–	5	4	–	7
Delaware State	1	–	6	1	–	10
Norfolk State	0	–	8	1	–	11
$ – Conference champion; ^ – NCAA Division I-AA playoff participant; Rankings from The Sports Network poll

The 2003 South Carolina State Bulldogs football team represented South Carolina State University as a member of the Mid-Eastern Athletic Conference (MEAC) during the 2003 NCAA Division I-AA football season. Led by second-year head coach Oliver Pough, the Bulldogs compiled an overall record of 8–4, with a mark of 5–2 in conference play, and finished tied for third in the MEAC.

== Schedule ==
Date	Opponent	Site	Result	Attendance	Source
August 30	at Tennessee State*	The Coliseum; Nashville, TN (John Merritt Classic)	L 20–37	18,124	
September 6	at Wofford*	Gibbs Stadium; Spartanburg, SC	L 13–35	11,486	
September 13	at Morgan State	Hughes Stadium; Baltimore, MD	W 27–21	3,576	
September 20	vs. Savannah State*	Johnson Hagood Stadium; Charleston, SC (Lowcountry Classic)	W 53–0	10,200	
September 27	vs. Benedict*	Williams–Brice Stadium; Columbia, SC (Palmetto Classic)	W 41–7	48,723	
October 11	Norfolk State	Oliver C. Dawson Stadium; Orangeburg, SC	W 34–15		
October 18	at No. 12 Bethune–Cookman	Municipal Stadium; Daytona Beach, FL	L 28–31	11,021	
October 25	at No. 25 Hampton	Armstrong Stadium; Hampton, VA	L 12–32		
November 1	Delaware State	Oliver C. Dawson Stadium; Orangeburg, SC	W 36–13	17,176	
November 8	at Howard	William H. Greene Stadium; Washington, DC	W 24–14	6,059	
November 15	Florida A&M	Oliver C. Dawson Stadium; Orangeburg, SC	W 27–15	11,044	
November 22	vs. No. 13 North Carolina A&T	American Legion Memorial Stadium; Charlotte, NC (rivalry)	W 49–9		
*Non-conference game; Rankings from The Sports Network Poll released prior to the game
