= 2003 Florida A&M Rattlers football team =

American college football season

2003 Florida A&M Rattlers football
- Conference: Mid-Eastern Athletic Conference
- Record: 6–6 (3–4 MEAC)
- Head coach: Billy Joe (10th season)
- Offensive scheme: Gulf Coast
- Defensive coordinator: Derek Hill (1st season)
- Base defense: 4–3
- Home stadium: Bragg Memorial Stadium

2003 Mid-Eastern Athletic Conference football standings
	Conf.			Overall
Team	W		L	W		L
No. 16 North Carolina A&T $^	7	–	1	10	–	3
No. 15 Bethune–Cookman ^	6	–	2	9	–	3
South Carolina State	5	–	2	8	–	4
Hampton	5	–	2	7	–	4
Morgan State	4	–	3	6	–	5
Florida A&M	3	–	4	6	–	6
Howard	2	–	5	4	–	7
Delaware State	1	–	6	1	–	10
Norfolk State	0	–	8	1	–	11
$ – Conference champion; ^ – NCAA Division I-AA playoff participant; Rankings from The Sports Network poll

The 2003 Florida A&M Rattlers football team represented Florida A&M University as a member of the Mid-Eastern Athletic Conference (MEAC) during the 2003 NCAA Division I-AA football season. Led by tenth-year head coach Billy Joe, the Rattlers compiled an overall record of 6–6, with a mark of 3–4 in conference play, and finished sixth in the MEAC.

== Schedule ==
Date	Opponent	Site	Result	Attendance	Source
August 30	vs. Alabama State*	Ford Field; Detroit, MI (Detroit Classic)	L 22–38	54,500	
September 6	Morgan State	Bragg Memorial Stadium; Tallahassee, FL	W 26–7	15,305	
September 13	at No. 19 (I-A) Florida*	Ben Hill Griffin Stadium; Gainesville, FL	L 3–63	90,087	
September 20	vs. Tennessee State*	Georgia Dome; Atlanta, GA (Atlanta Football Classic)	W 10–7	70,185	
September 27	Delaware State	Bragg Memorial Stadium; Tallahassee, FL	W 15–14	22,159	
October 4	vs. Jackson State*	RCA Dome; Indianapolis, IN (Circle City Classic)	W 28–14	58,198	
October 11	at Howard	William H. Greene Stadium; Washington, DC	L 14–16	10,500	
October 18	at No. 25 North Carolina A&T	Aggie Stadium; Greensboro, NC	L 16–22	18,301	
October 25	Norfolk State^{†}	Bragg Memorial Stadium; Tallahassee, FL	W 60–10	26,514	
November 1	at No. 21 Hampton	Armstrong Stadium; Hampton, VA	W 34–23	3,572	
November 15	at South Carolina State	Oliver C. Dawson Stadium; Orangeburg, SC	L 15–27	11,044	
November 22	vs. No. 15 Bethune–Cookman	Florida Citrus Bowl; Orlando, FL (Florida Classic)	L 35–39	73,358	
*Non-conference game; ^{†}Homecoming; Rankings from The Sports Network Poll released prior to the game
