= 2003 Alcorn State Braves football team =

American college football season

2003 Alcorn State Braves football

SWAC East Division co-champion
- Conference: Southwestern Athletic Conference
- East Division
- Record: 7–5 (5–2 SWAC)
- Head coach: Johnny Thomas (6th season)
- Offensive coordinator: John McKenzie (4th season)
- Home stadium: Jack Spinks Stadium

2003 Southwestern Athletic Conference football standings
	Conf.			Overall
Team	W		L	W		L
East Division
Alabama State xy	5	–	2	8	–	5
Alcorn State x	5	–	2	7	–	5
Alabama A&M	4	–	3	8	–	4
Jackson State	2	–	5	2	–	10
Mississippi Valley State	1	–	6	2	–	9
West Division
No. 13 Southern xy$	6	–	1	12	–	1
No. 17 Grambling State x	6	–	1	9	–	3
Texas Southern	3	–	4	5	–	6
Arkansas–Pine Bluff	3	–	4	4	–	7
Prairie View A&M	0	–	7	1	–	10
Championship: Southern 20, Alabama State 9
$ – Conference champion; x – Division champion/co-champions; Rankings from The Sports Network Poll

The 2003 Alcorn State Braves football team represented Alcorn State University as a member of the Southwestern Athletic Conference (SWAC) during the 2003 NCAA Division I-AA football season. Led by sixth-year head coach Johnny Thomas, the Braves compiled an overall record of 7–5, with a conference record of 5–2, and finished tied for first in the SWAC East Division.

== Schedule ==
Date	Time	Opponent	Site	Result	Attendance	Source
August 30		at Arkansas–Pine Bluff	Golden Lion Stadium; Pine Bluff, AR	W 37–10		
September 6		No. 15 Grambling State	Jack Spinks Stadium; Lorman, MS	L 28–40	28,500	
September 13		at Alabama State	Cramton Bowl; Montgomery, AL	L 28–49	11,237	
September 27	7:00 p.m.	at Stephen F. Austin*	Homer Bryce Stadium; Nacogdoches, TX	L 7–60	10,160	
October 4		at Fort Valley State*	Wildcat Stadium; Fort Valley, GA	L 20–31		
October 11		Prairie View A&M	Jack Spinks Stadium; Lorman, MS	W 66–0	17,584	
October 18		at Texas Southern	Reliant Astrodome; Houston, TX	L 20–23		
October 25		at No. 14 Southern	A. W. Mumford Stadium; Baton Rouge, LA	W 36–34		
November 1		Southeastern Louisiana*	Jack Spinks Stadium; Lorman, MS	W 27–24	4,000	
November 8		Mississippi Valley State	Jack Spinks Stadium; Lorman, MS	W 23–7		
November 15		Alabama A&M	Jack Spinks Stadium; Lorman, MS	W 20–15		
November 22		at Jackson State	Mississippi Veterans Memorial Stadium; Jackson, MS (Capital City Classic)	W 49–25	45,000	
*Non-conference game; Rankings from The Sports Network Poll released prior to the game; All times are in Central time
