= 2003 Jacksonville State Gamecocks football team =

American college football season

2003 Jacksonville State Gamecocks football

OVC champion

NCAA Division I-AA First Round, L 7–45 at Western Kentucky
- Conference: Ohio Valley Conference

Ranking
- Sports Network: No. 18
- Record: 8–4 (7–1 OVC)
- Head coach: Jack Crowe (4th season)
- Offensive coordinator: Willie J. Slater (4th season)
- Defensive coordinator: Greg Stewart (4th season)
- Home stadium: Paul Snow Stadium

2003 Ohio Valley Conference football standings
	Conf.			Overall
Team	W		L	W		L
No. 18 Jacksonville State $^	7	–	1	8	–	4
Eastern Kentucky	6	–	2	7	–	5
Samford	5	–	3	7	–	4
Tennessee State	5	–	3	7	–	5
Southeast Missouri State	5	–	3	5	–	7
Murray State	3	–	5	4	–	8
Eastern Illinois	3	–	5	4	–	8
Tennessee Tech	1	–	7	2	–	9
Tennessee–Martin	1	–	7	2	–	10
$ – Conference champion; ^ – NCAA Division I-AA playoff participant; Rankings from The Sports Network poll

The 2003 Jacksonville State Gamecocks football team represented Jacksonville State University as a member of the Ohio Valley Conference (OVC) during the 2003 NCAA Division I-AA football season. Led by Forth-year head coach Jack Crowe, the Gamecocks compiled an overall record of 8–4 with a mark of 7–1 in conference play, winning the OVC title in their first year in the league and first conference title since transitioning to NCAA Division I-AA competition. Jacksonville State advanced to the NCAA Division I-AA Football Championship playoffs for the first time, losing in the first round to Western Kentucky. The team played home games at Paul Snow Stadium in Jacksonville, Alabama.

== Schedule ==
Date	Time	Opponent	Rank	Site	Result	Attendance	Source
August 30	6:30 p.m.	at Alabama A&M*		Louis Crews Stadium; Huntsville, AL	W 9–3	13,004	
September 13	7:00 p.m.	North Alabama*		Paul Snow Stadium; Jacksonville, AL	L 16–28	13,662	
September 20	6:00 p.m.	at Kansas*		Memorial Stadium; Lawrence, KS	L 6–41	34,712	
September 27	7:00 p.m.	Eastern Kentucky		Paul Snow Stadium; Jacksonville, AL	W 49–14	7,012	
October 4	2:30 p.m.	at Murray State		Roy Stewart Stadium; Murray, KY	L 17–23 ^{OT}	2,952	
October 11	4:00 p.m.	Tennessee–Martin		Paul Snow Stadium; Jacksonville, AL	W 34–24	12,483	
October 18	6:00 p.m.	at Tennessee State		The Coliseum; Nashville, TN	W 34–7	8,023	
October 25	7:00 p.m.	Tennessee Tech		Paul Snow Stadium; Jacksonville, AL	W 37–20	9,683	
November 8	1:00 p.m.	at Samford		Seibert Stadium; Homewood, AL (rivalry)	W 49–32	10,780	
November 15	4:00 p.m.	Eastern Illinois	No. 21	Paul Snow Stadium; Jacksonville, AL	W 36–24	8,674	
November 22	12:00 p.m.	at Southeast Missouri State	No. 19	Houck Stadium; Cape Girardeau, MO	W 22–17	6,650	
November 29	2:30 p.m.	at No. 9 Western Kentucky	No. 17	L. T. Smith Stadium; Bowling Green, KY (NCAA Division I-AA First Round)	L 7–45	3,573	
*Non-conference game; Rankings from The Sports Network Poll released prior to the game; All times are in Central time
