= Butch Posey =

American football player and coach

Biographical details
- Born: 1962 or 1963 (age 63–64); Pittsburgh, Pennsylvania, U.S.

Playing career
- c. 1980s: Morgan State
- c. 1980s: Slippery Rock

Coaching career (HC unless noted)
- 1993–1994: Clairton HS (PA) (assistant)
- 1995: Slippery Rock (LB)
- 1996: East Stroudsburg (DL)
- 1997: Edinboro (DL)
- 1998: Johnson C. Smith (DL/RC)
- 1999: North Carolina Central (DL)
- 2000–2002: Delaware State (DL/RC)
- 2003: Delaware State (DC)
- 2003: Delaware State (interim HC)

Head coaching record
- Overall: 1–4

Butch Posey (born 1962 or 1963) is an American former football player and coach. He served as the interim head coach at Delaware State University in 2003.

A native of Pittsburgh, Pennsylvania, Posey attended college at Morgan State and Slippery Rock, playing on defense for both of their football teams. After earning a bachelor's degree in political science from Slippery Rock, Posey became an assistant coach at Clairton High School. He earned his first college coaching job in 1995, as Slippery Rock's linebackers coach. In the following years he would serve as defensive line coach for East Stroudsburg, Edinboro, Johnson C. Smith, North Carolina Central, and Delaware State before being promoted to Delaware State defensive coordinator in 2003. In late 2003, Hornet coach Ben Blacknall was fired after posting a 0–6 record. Posey was promoted to interim head coach and served in the final five games, compiling a 1–4 mark. He did not return to Delaware State the following year.

== Head coaching record ==
Year	Team	Overall	Conference	Standing	Bowl/playoffs
Delaware State Hornets (Mid-Eastern Athletic Conference) (2003)
2003	Delaware State	1–4 (Note: Ben Blacknall served as Delaware State's head coach for six games of the 2003 season before he was fired on October 13. Posey replaced Blacknall as interim head coach for the remainder of the season. Delaware State finished the year 1–10 overall and 1–6 in Mid-Eastern Athletic Conference play.)	1–4	8th	
Delaware State:		1–4	1–4		
Total:		1–4			
