= 2003 Morgan State Bears football team =

American college football season

2003 Morgan State Bears football
- Conference: Mid-Eastern Athletic Conference
- Record: 6–5 (4–3 MEAC)
- Head coach: Donald Hill-Eley (2nd season)
- Home stadium: Hughes Stadium

2003 Mid-Eastern Athletic Conference football standings
| | Conf. | | | Overall |
| Team | W | | L | W | | L |
|---|---|---|---|---|---|---|
| No. 16 North Carolina A&T $^ | 7 | – | 1 | 10 | – | 3 |
| No. 15 Bethune–Cookman ^ | 6 | – | 2 | 9 | – | 3 |
| South Carolina State | 5 | – | 2 | 8 | – | 4 |
| Hampton | 5 | – | 2 | 7 | – | 4 |
| Morgan State | 4 | – | 3 | 6 | – | 5 |
| Florida A&M | 3 | – | 4 | 6 | – | 6 |
| Howard | 2 | – | 5 | 4 | – | 7 |
| Delaware State | 1 | – | 6 | 1 | – | 10 |
| Norfolk State | 0 | – | 8 | 1 | – | 11 |
$ – Conference champion; ^ – NCAA Division I-AA playoff participant; Rankings from The Sports Network poll

The 2003 Morgan State Bears football team represented Morgan State University as a member of the Mid-Eastern Athletic Conference (MEAC) during the 2003 NCAA Division I-AA football season. Led by second-year head coach Donald Hill-Eley, the Bears compiled an overall record of 6–5, with a mark of 4–3 in conference play, and finished fifth in the MEAC.

== Schedule ==
| Date | Opponent | Site | Result | Attendance | Source |
|---|---|---|---|---|---|
| August 30 | Towson* | Hughes Stadium; Baltimore, MD (rivalry) | W 19–16 | 4,574 | |
| September 6 | at Florida A&M | Bragg Memorial Stadium; Tallahassee, FL | L 7–26 | 15,305 | |
| September 13 | South Carolina State | Hughes Stadium; Baltimore, MD | L 21–27 | 3,576 | |
| September 27 | vs. Hampton | Giants Stadium; East Rutherford, NJ (New York Urban League Football Classic) | L 21–24 ^{OT} | | |
| October 4 | at No. 5 Bethune–Cookman | Municipal Stadium; Daytona Beach, FL | W 31–24 ^{OT} | 7,465 | |
| October 11 | North Carolina A&T | Hughes Stadium; Baltimore, MD | L 21–28 | 5,615 | |
| October 18 | Howard^{†} | Hughes Stadium; Baltimore, MD (rivalry) | W 33–12 | 14,576 | |
| October 25 | at Delaware State | Alumni Stadium; Dover, DE | W 53–36 | 5,349 | |
| November 1 | at Savannah State* | Ted Wright Stadium; Savannah, GA | W 45–14 | | |
| November 8 | Maine* | Hughes Stadium; Baltimore, MD | L 24–77 | | |
| November 22 | Norfolk State | Hughes Stadium; Baltimore, MD | W 43–34 | 4,254 | |
*Non-conference game; ^{†}Homecoming; Rankings from The Sports Network Poll released prior to the game
