= 2003 Northwestern State Demons football team =

American college football season

2003 Northwestern State Demons football
- Conference: Southland Conference
- Record: 7–5 (2–3 Southland)
- Head coach: Scott Stoker (2nd season)
- Offensive coordinator: Darryl Mason (2nd season)
- Defensive coordinator: Brad Laird (1st season)
- Home stadium: Harry Turpin Stadium

2003 Southland Conference football standings
	Conf.			Overall
Team	W		L	W		L
No. 8 McNeese State $^	5	–	0	10	–	2
Stephen F. Austin	4	–	1	7	–	4
Northwestern State	2	–	3	7	–	5
Texas State	2	–	3	5	–	7
Sam Houston State	2	–	3	3	–	8
Nicholls State†	0	–	5	0	–	11
$ – Conference champion; ^ – NCAA Division I-AA playoff participant; † – Nicholls State forfeited 5 wins, including 3 conference victories.; Rankings from The Sports Network poll

The 2003 Northwestern State Demons football team represented Northwestern State University as a member of the Southland Conference during the 2003 NCAA Division I-AA football season. Led by second-year head coach Scott Stoker, the Demons compiled an overall record of 7–5 with a mark of 2–3 in conference play, tying for third place in Southland. Northwestern State played home games at Harry Turpin Stadium in Natchitoches, Louisiana.

== Schedule ==
Date	Time	Opponent	Rank	Site	TV	Result	Attendance	Source
August 30	6:00 pm	Jackson State*	No. 22	Harry Turpin Stadium; Natchitoches, LA		W 23–7	12,320	
September 6	7:00 pm	at Tulane*		Tad Gormley Stadium; New Orleans, LA		L 24–27 ^{OT}	25,116	
September 13	6:00 pm	Delaware State*	No. 19	Harry Turpin Stadium; Natchitoches, LA		W 43–6	11,202	
September 20	7:00 pm	at Louisiana–Monroe*		Malone Stadium; Monroe, LA		W 14–10	16,035	
September 27	4:00 pm	at Northern Iowa*	No. 11	UNI-Dome; Cedar Falls, IA		L 10–43	13,102	
October 4	6:00 pm	Oklahoma Panhandle State*		Harry Turpin Stadium; Natchitoches, LA		W 59–0	12,648	
October 11	6:00 pm	Southeastern Louisiana*		Harry Turpin Stadium; Natchitoches, LA (rivalry)		W 87–27	10,192	
October 18	6:00 pm	at Texas State	No. 19	Bobcat Stadium; San Marcos, TX	TSAA	W 49–19	11,752	
October 25	2:30 pm	Nicholls State	No. 18	Harry Turpin Stadium; Natchitoches, LA (NSU Challenge)		W 30–40 (forfeit win)	10,178	
November 8	2:00 pm	at Sam Houston State		Bowers Stadium; Huntsville, TX		L 24–29	8,129	
November 15	7:00 pm	at No. 1 McNeese State		Cowboy Stadium; Lake Charles, LA (rivalry)	SCTN	W 9–13	17,289	
November 22	3:00 pm	Stephen F. Austin		Harry Turpin Stadium; Natchitoches, LA (Chief Caddo)		L 14–44	7,701	
*Non-conference game; Rankings from The Sports Network Poll released prior to the game; All times are in Central time
