= 2003 Prairie View A&M Panthers football team =

American college football season

2003 Prairie View A&M Panthers football
- Conference: Southwestern Athletic Conference
- West Division
- Record: 1–10 (0–7 SWAC)
- Head coach: C. L. Whittington (1st season)
- Home stadium: Edward L. Blackshear Field; Reliant Astrodome

2003 Southwestern Athletic Conference football standings
| | Conf. | | | Overall |
| Team | W | | L | W | | L |
|---|---|---|---|---|---|---|
East Division
| Alabama State xy | 5 | – | 2 | 8 | – | 5 |
| Alcorn State x | 5 | – | 2 | 7 | – | 5 |
| Alabama A&M | 4 | – | 3 | 8 | – | 4 |
| Jackson State | 2 | – | 5 | 2 | – | 10 |
| Mississippi Valley State | 1 | – | 6 | 2 | – | 9 |
West Division
| No. 13 Southern xy$ | 6 | – | 1 | 12 | – | 1 |
| No. 17 Grambling State x | 6 | – | 1 | 9 | – | 3 |
| Texas Southern | 3 | – | 4 | 5 | – | 6 |
| Arkansas–Pine Bluff | 3 | – | 4 | 4 | – | 7 |
| Prairie View A&M | 0 | – | 7 | 1 | – | 10 |
Championship: Southern 20, Alabama State 9
$ – Conference champion; x – Division champion/co-champions; Rankings from The Sports Network Poll

The 2003 Prairie View A&M Panthers football team represented Prairie View A&M University as a member of the Southwestern Athletic Conference (SWAC) during the 2003 NCAA Division I-AA football season. Led by first-year head coach C. L. Whittington, the Panthers compiled an overall record of 1–10, with a mark of 0–7 in conference play, and finished fifth in the SWAC West Division.

== Schedule ==
| Date | Opponent | Site | Result | Attendance | Source |
|---|---|---|---|---|---|
| August 30 | at Texas Southern | Reliant Stadium; Houston, TX (Labor Day Classic) | L 3–42 | | |
| September 6 | vs. Southern | Independence Stadium; Shreveport, LA (Port City Classic) | L 7–62 | | |
| September 13 | Paul Quinn* | Edward L. Blackshear Field; Prairie View, TX | W 45–31 | | |
| September 27 | Alabama A&M | Edward L. Blackshear Field; Prairie View, TX | L 10–50 | | |
| October 4 | vs. No. 18 Grambling State | Cotton Bowl; Dallas, TX (State Fair Classic) | L 7–65 | 55,432 | |
| October 11 | at Alcorn State | Jack Spinks Stadium; Lorman, MS | L 0–66 | 17,584 | |
| October 18 | at Alabama State | Cramton Bowl; Montgomery, AL | L 7–59 | 7,488 | |
| October 25 | Texas College*^{†} | Edward L. Blackshear Field; Prairie View, TX | L 10–21 | 7,500 | |
| November 1 | Mississippi Valley State | Edward L. Blackshear Field; Prairie View, TX | L 3–40 | | |
| November 8 | Arkansas–Pine Bluff | Reliant Astrodome; Houston, TX | L 7–43 | | |
| November 15 | at Southeastern Louisiana* | Strawberry Stadium; Hammond, LA | L 10–64 | 8,242 | |
*Non-conference game; ^{†}Homecoming; Rankings from The Sports Network Poll released prior to the game
