= 2003 Delaware State Hornets football team =

American college football season

2003 Delaware State Hornets football
- Conference: Mid-Eastern Athletic Conference
- Record: 1–10 (1–7 MEAC)
- Head coach: Ben Blacknall (4th season; first 6 games); Butch Posey (interim; final 5 games)
- Home stadium: Alumni Stadium

2003 Mid-Eastern Athletic Conference football standings
| | Conf. | | | Overall |
| Team | W | | L | W | | L |
|---|---|---|---|---|---|---|
| No. 16 North Carolina A&T $^ | 7 | – | 1 | 10 | – | 3 |
| No. 15 Bethune–Cookman ^ | 6 | – | 2 | 9 | – | 3 |
| South Carolina State | 5 | – | 2 | 8 | – | 4 |
| Hampton | 5 | – | 2 | 7 | – | 4 |
| Morgan State | 4 | – | 3 | 6 | – | 5 |
| Florida A&M | 3 | – | 4 | 6 | – | 6 |
| Howard | 2 | – | 5 | 4 | – | 7 |
| Delaware State | 1 | – | 6 | 1 | – | 10 |
| Norfolk State | 0 | – | 8 | 1 | – | 11 |
$ – Conference champion; ^ – NCAA Division I-AA playoff participant; Rankings from The Sports Network poll

The 2003 Delaware State Hornets football team represented Delaware State University as a member of the Mid-Eastern Athletic Conference (MEAC) in the 2003 NCAA Division I-AA football season. The Hornets played their home games at Alumni Stadium.

The Hornets were led by third-year head coach Ben Blacknall, before he was fired on October 15, 2003. Delaware State was 0–6 to start the season and 16–24 during Blacknall's tenure. Defensive Line coach and recruiting coordinator Butch Posey was then named interim coach.

== Schedule ==
| Date | Time | Opponent | Site | Result | Attendance | Source |
|---|---|---|---|---|---|---|
| September 6 | 1:00 p.m. | Bucknell* | Alumni Stadium; Dover, DE | L 28–33 | 4,756 | |
| September 13 | 7:00 p.m. | at No. 19 Northwestern State* | Harry Turpin Stadium; Natchitoches, LA | L 6–43 | 11,202 | |
| September 20 | 6:00 p.m. | at North Carolina Central* | O'Kelly–Riddick Stadium; Durham, NC | L 14–21 | 5,219 | |
| September 27 | 7:00 p.m. | at Florida A&M | Bragg Memorial Stadium; Tallahassee, FL | L 14–15 | 22,149 | |
| October 4 | 1:00 p.m. | at Hampton | Armstrong Stadium; Hampton, VA | L 9–41 | 7,583 | |
| October 11 | 1:00 p.m. | No. 13 Bethune–Cookman | Alumni Stadium; Dover, DE | L 13–27 | 2,400 | |
| October 25 | 1:00 p.m. | Morgan State^{†} | Alumni Stadium; Dover, DE | L 36–53 | 5,349 | |
| November 1 | 1:30 p.m. | at South Carolina State | Oliver C. Dawson Stadium; Orangeburg, SC | L 13–36 | 17,176 | |
| November 8 | 1:30 p.m. | at No. 14 North Carolina A&T | Aggie Stadium; Greensboro, NC | L 7–33 | 17,812 | |
| November 15 | 12:00 p.m. | Norfolk State | Alumni Stadium; Dover, DE | W 36–25 | 2,138 | |
| November 22 | 12:00 p.m. | Howard | Alumni Stadium; Dover, DE | L 6–21 | 2,871 | |
*Non-conference game; ^{†}Homecoming; Rankings from The Sports Network Poll released prior to the game; All times are in Eastern time
