= 2003 Mississippi Valley State Delta Devils football team =

American college football season

2003 Mississippi Valley State Delta Devils football
- Conference: Southwestern Athletic Conference
- East Division
- Record: 2–9 (1–8 SWAC)
- Head coach: Willie Totten (2nd season)
- Defensive coordinator: Sam Washington (2nd season)
- Home stadium: Rice–Totten Stadium

2003 Southwestern Athletic Conference football standings
	Conf.			Overall
Team	W		L	W		L
East Division
Alabama State xy	5	–	2	8	–	5
Alcorn State x	5	–	2	7	–	5
Alabama A&M	4	–	3	8	–	4
Jackson State	2	–	5	2	–	10
Mississippi Valley State	1	–	6	2	–	9
West Division
No. 13 Southern xy$	6	–	1	12	–	1
No. 17 Grambling State x	6	–	1	9	–	3
Texas Southern	3	–	4	5	–	6
Arkansas–Pine Bluff	3	–	4	4	–	7
Prairie View A&M	0	–	7	1	–	10
Championship: Southern 20, Alabama State 9
$ – Conference champion; x – Division champion/co-champions; Rankings from The Sports Network Poll

The 2003 Mississippi Valley State Delta Devils football team represented Mississippi Valley State University as a member of the Southwestern Athletic Conference (SWAC) during the 2003 NCAA Division I-AA football season. Led by second-year head coach Willie Totten, the Delta Devils compiled an overall record of 2–9 and a mark of 1–8 in conference play, and finished last in the SWAC East Division.

== Schedule ==
Date	Opponent	Site	Result	Attendance	Source
August 30	vs. Southern	Mississippi Veterans Memorial Stadium; Jackson, MS	L 0–29	12,350	
September 6	at Arkansas–Pine Bluff	Golden Lion Stadium; Pine Bluff, AR	L 7–27		
September 13	at Delta State*	Travis Parker Field; Cleveland, MS	L 0–45	6,400	
September 20	Alabama A&M	Rice–Totten Stadium; Itta Bena, MS	L 0–37		
September 27	Jackson State	Rice–Totten Stadium; Itta Bena, MS	L 17–21	13,743	
October 11	at No. 16 Grambling State	Eddie Robinson Stadium; Grambling, LA	L 6–45	6,397	
October 18	at Paul Quinn*	Tiger Stadium; Lancaster, TX	W 56–16		
October 25	Texas Southern	Rice–Totten Stadium; Itta Bena, MS	L 17–30		
November 1	at Prairie View A&M	Edward L. Blackshear Field; Prairie View, TX	W 40–3		
November 8	at Alcorn State	Jack Spinks Stadium; Lorman, MS	L 7–23		
November 15	Alabama State	Rice–Totten Stadium; Itta Bena, MS	L 31–55		
*Non-conference game; Rankings from The Sports Network Poll released prior to the game
