= 2003 North Carolina A&T Aggies football team =

American college football season

2003 North Carolina A&T Aggies football

MEAC champion

NCAA Division I-AA First Round, L 10–31 at Wofford
- Conference: Mid-Eastern Athletic Conference

Ranking
- Sports Network: No. 16
- Record: 10–3 (6–1 MEAC)
- Head coach: George Small (1st season)
- Home stadium: Aggie Stadium

2003 Mid-Eastern Athletic Conference football standings
	Conf.			Overall
Team	W		L	W		L
No. 16 North Carolina A&T $^	7	–	1	10	–	3
No. 15 Bethune–Cookman ^	6	–	2	9	–	3
South Carolina State	5	–	2	8	–	4
Hampton	5	–	2	7	–	4
Morgan State	4	–	3	6	–	5
Florida A&M	3	–	4	6	–	6
Howard	2	–	5	4	–	7
Delaware State	1	–	6	1	–	10
Norfolk State	0	–	8	1	–	11
$ – Conference champion; ^ – NCAA Division I-AA playoff participant; Rankings from The Sports Network poll

The 2003 North Carolina A&T Aggies football team represented North Carolina A&T State University as a member of the Mid-Eastern Athletic Conference (MEAC) during the 2003 NCAA Division I-AA football season. Led by first-year head coach George Small, the Aggies compiled an overall record of 10–3, with a mark of 6–1 in conference play, and finished as MEAC champion. North Carolina A&T advanced to the NCAA Division I-AA Football Championship playoffs, where the Aggies lost to Wofford in the first round.

== Schedule ==
Date	Opponent	Rank	Site	Result	Attendance	Source
August 31	vs. North Carolina Central*		Carter–Finley Stadium; Raleigh, NC (rivalry)	W 25–0	21,430	
September 6	at Jackson State*		Mississippi Veterans Memorial Stadium; Jackson, MS	W 10–7 ^{OT}	11,157	
September 13	vs. Southern*		Sam Boyd Stadium; Whitney, NV (Las Vegas Football Classic)	L 16–35		
September 27	at Elon*		Rhodes Stadium; Elon, NC	W 29–14	10,536	
October 4	at Norfolk State		William "Dick" Price Stadium; Norfolk, VA	W 34–14		
October 11	at Morgan State		Hughes Stadium; Baltimore, MD	W 28–21	5,615	
October 18	Florida A&M	No. 25	Aggie Stadium; Greensboro, NC	W 22–16	18,301	
October 25	Howard^{†}	No. 23	Aggie Stadium; Greensboro, NC	W 27–7	26,685	
November 1	at No. 9 Bethune–Cookman	No. 19	Municipal Stadium; Daytona Beach, FL	W 13–7		
November 8	Delaware State	No. 14	Aggie Stadium; Greensboro, NC	W 33–7	17,812	
November 15	Hampton	No. 14	Aggie Stadium; Greensboro, NC	W 38–28	18,765	
November 22	vs. South Carolina State	No. 13	American Legion Memorial Stadium; Charlotte, NC (rivalry)	L 9–49		
November 29	at No. 2 Wofford*	No. 18	Gibbs Stadium; Spartanburg, SC (NCAA Division I-AA First Round)	L 10–31	10,500	
*Non-conference game; ^{†}Homecoming; Rankings from The Sports Network Poll released prior to the game
