= Ben Blacknall =

American football player and coach (1946–2012)

Biographical details
- Born: September 26, 1946
- Died: April 25, 2012 (aged 65)

Playing career
- 1968–1971: North Carolina A&T

Coaching career (HC unless noted)
- 1972–1976: North Carolina A&T (assistant)
- 1977–1978: South Carolina State (assistant)
- 1979–1983: Wichita State (assistant)
- 1984–1988: Howard (assistant)
- 1989–1998: South Carolina State (assistant)
- 1999: Morehouse (assistant)
- 2000–2003: Delaware State
- 2007–2011: Alabama A&M (assistant)

Head coaching record
- Overall: 16–24

Accomplishments and honors

Awards
- MEAC Coach of the Year (2000)

Benjamin Sylvester Blacknall (September 26, 1946 – April 25, 2012) was an American football player and coach also former sergeant (Sgt.) in the Air Force. He served as the head football coach for Delaware Hornets at Delaware State University from 2000 to 2003, compiling a record of 16–24. He was fired midway through the 2003 season after Delaware State lost their first six games. Blacknall played college football for North Carolina A&T Aggies at North Carolina A&T University under the guidance of Willie Jeffries. Blacknall lettered at A&T from 1968 to 1971, graduating with a bachelor's degree in 1975. Blacknall was mentor to Anthony Jones, who had played for Wichita State under his guidance and recruited Blacknall to Morehouse in 1999.

== Awards and honors ==
=== Mid-Eastern Athletic Conference ===
- MEAC Defensive Player of the Year (1971, 1972)
- MEAC Coach of the Year (2000)

=== North Carolina A&T Sports Hall of Fame ===
- Hall of Fame Inductee (2000)

=== 100 percent Wrong Club of Atlanta ===
- Coach of the Year (2000)

== Head coaching record ==
Year	Team	Overall	Conference	Standing	Bowl/playoffs
Delaware State Hornets (Mid-Eastern Athletic Conference) (2000–2003)
2000	Delaware State	7–4	5–3	T–4th	
2001	Delaware State	5–6	3–5	T–6th	
2002	Delaware State	4–8	2–6	T–7th	
2003	Delaware State	0–6 (Note: Blacknall was fired on October 13, 2003, after the first six games of the 2003 season. Butch Posey replaced Blacknall as interim head coach for the remainder of the season. Delaware State finished the year 1–10 overall and 1–6 in Mid-Eastern Athletic Conference play, placing eighth.)	0–2		
Delaware State:		16–24	10–16		
Total:		16–24			

== See also ==
- Deaths in April 2012
- List of Delaware State Hornets football seasons
- Blacknall
