= Jay Mills =

American football coach

Biographical details
- Born: c. 1959 or 1960 (age 65–66); Michigan City, Indiana, U.S.
- Education: Western Washington University (1984)

Playing career
- 1980–1981: Illinois State
- Position: Quarterback

Coaching career (HC unless noted)
- 1982: Central Catholic HS (IL) (OC)
- 1983: Western Washington (QB)
- 1984 (spring): Western Washington (AHC/QB)
- 1984–1986: Notre Dame (GA)
- 1987–1988: Boise State (QB)
- 1989–1991: Boise State (RB)
- 1992: Boise State (QB)
- 1993–1995: Minnesota–Morris
- 1996–1999: Harvard (co-OC/QB)
- 2000–2002: Harvard (OC/QB)
- 2003–2012: Charleston Southern

Head coaching record
- Overall: 51–84

Accomplishments and honors

Championships
- 1 Big South (2005)

Awards
- Big South Coach of the Year (2005)

Jay Mills is an American former college football coach and pastor. He is the executive pastor at Pleasant Valley Community Church in Owensboro, Kentucky. Mills served as the head football coach at University of Minnesota Morris from 1993 to 1995 and at Charleston Southern University from 2003 to 2012, compiling a career college football coaching record of 51–85.

== Playing career ==
Mills grew up in Michigan City, Indiana, and attended Michigan City High School. Mills played football for Illinois State before graduating in 1980 and 1981. He served as the Redbirds scout quarterback, learning every opponent's offense every week. He stated that it had helped him in becoming a coach.

== Coaching career ==
Mills opted to forgo his final two years of eligibility and joined Central Catholic High School as the team's offensive coordinator. In 1983, he began coaching for Western Washington, where he was enrolled and pursuing his bachelor's degree, as the team's quarterbacks coach alongside assisting with recruiting. In the spring of 1984, he was promoted to assistant head coach. Despite the promotion, Mills opted instead to join Notre Dame as a graduate assistant. In his three seasons with the Fighting Irish, Mills worked with the quarterbacks in 1984, tight ends and special teams in 1985, and the defensive backs in 1985.

In 1987, Mills was hired as the quarterbacks coach for Boise State. He spent two seasons working with the quarterbacks before shifting to the running backs coach position when Jim Zorn was hired. He returned to coaching the quarterback's upon Zorn's departure prior to the 1992 season.

In 1993, Mills was hired as the head football coach for the University of Minnesota Morris. After back-to-back nine-loss seasons, he opened his third season winning zero of the team's first three games. Following a total of record 3–21, Mills resigned as the team's head coach. Mills then spent 1996 to 1999 as the co-offensive coordinator and quarterbacks coach for Harvard. In 2000, he took over the sole position of offensive coordinator.

Mills was the head coach at Charleston Southern University from 2003 to 2012, compiling a career college football record of 51–85. Mills retired from coaching on January 3, 2013, to pursue a new career path in athletic administration.

== Head coaching record ==
Year	Team	Overall	Conference	Standing	Bowl/playoffs
Minnesota–Morris Cougars (Northern Sun Intercollegiate Conference) (1993–1995)
1993	Minnesota–Morris	2–9	1–5	6th	
1994	Minnesota–Morris	1–9	0–6	7th	
1995	Minnesota–Morris	0–3 (Note: Mills coached only the first three games of the season. The remaining seven games were coached by Steve Barrows. Minnesota–Morris finished the year with an overall record of 0–10, placing seventh in the conference with a mark of 0–6.)	0–1		
Minnesota–Morris:		3–21	1–12		
Charleston Southern Buccaneers (Big South Conference) (2003–2012)
2003	Charleston Southern	1–11	0–4	5th	
2004	Charleston Southern	5–5	1–3	4th	
2005	Charleston Southern	7–4	3–1	T–1st	
2006	Charleston Southern	9–2	2–2	T–2nd	
2007	Charleston Southern	5–6	1–3	4th	
2008	Charleston Southern	7–5	3–2	T–2nd	
2009	Charleston Southern	6–5	4–2	3rd	
2010	Charleston Southern	3–8	1–5	T–6th	
2011	Charleston Southern	0–11	0–6	7th	
2012	Charleston Southern	5–6	3–3	4th	
Charleston Southern:		48–63	18–31		
Total:		51–84			
National championship Conference title Conference division title or championship game berth
