= 2003 Bethune–Cookman Wildcats football team =

American college football season

2003 Bethune–Cookman Wildcats football

NCAA Division I-AA First Round, L 24–32 vs. Florida Atlantic
- Conference: Mid-Eastern Athletic Conference

Ranking
- Sports Network: No. 15
- Record: 9–3 (6–2 MEAC)
- Head coach: Alvin Wyatt (7th season)
- Home stadium: Municipal Stadium

2003 Mid-Eastern Athletic Conference football standings
	Conf.			Overall
Team	W		L	W		L
No. 16 North Carolina A&T $^	7	–	1	10	–	3
No. 15 Bethune–Cookman ^	6	–	2	9	–	3
South Carolina State	5	–	2	8	–	4
Hampton	5	–	2	7	–	4
Morgan State	4	–	3	6	–	5
Florida A&M	3	–	4	6	–	6
Howard	2	–	5	4	–	7
Delaware State	1	–	6	1	–	10
Norfolk State	0	–	8	1	–	11
$ – Conference champion; ^ – NCAA Division I-AA playoff participant; Rankings from The Sports Network poll

The 2003 Bethune–Cookman Wildcats football team represented Bethune–Cookman College (now known as Bethune–Cookman University) as a member of the Mid-Eastern Athletic Conference (MEAC) during the 2003 NCAA Division I-AA football season. Led by seventh-year head coach Alvin Wyatt, the Wildcats compiled an overall record of 9–3, with a mark of 6–2 in conference play, and finished second in the MEAC. Bethune–Cookman advanced to the NCAA Division I-AA Football Championship playoffs, where the Wildcats lost to Florida Atlantic in the first round.

== Schedule ==
Date	Opponent	Rank	Site	Result	Attendance	Source
August 30	vs. Savannah State*	No. 10	Alltel Stadium; Jacksonville, FL (Gateway Classic)	W 62–12	18,478	
September 6	vs. Alabama State*	No. 8	Ladd–Peebles Stadium; Mobile, AL (Gulf Coast Classic)	W 31–26		
September 20	at FIU*	No. 7	FIU Stadium; Miami, FL	W 24–14	13,123	
September 27	at Norfolk State	No. 6	William "Dick" Price Stadium; Norfolk, VA	W 56–14		
October 4	Morgan State	No. 5	Municipal Stadium; Daytona Beach, FL	L 24–31 ^{OT}	7,465	
October 11	at Delaware State	No. 13	Alumni Stadium; Dover, DE	W 27–13	2,400	
October 18	South Carolina State	No. 12	Municipal Stadium; Daytona Beach, FL	W 31–28	11,021	
November 1	No. 19 North Carolina A&T	No. 9	Municipal Stadium; Daytona Beach, FL	L 7–13		
November 8	No. 25 Hampton	No. 17	Municipal Stadium; Daytona Beach, FL	W 30–27		
November 15	at Howard	No. 16	William H. Greene Stadium; Washington, DC	W 21–7		
November 22	vs. Florida A&M	No. 15	Florida Citrus Bowl; Orlando, FL (Florida Classic)	W 39–35	73,358	
November 29	No. 13 Florida Atlantic*	No. 14	Municipal Stadium; Daytona Beach, FL (NCAA Division I-AA First Round)	L 24–32	8,468	
*Non-conference game; Rankings from The Sports Network Poll released prior to the game
