= 2003 Sam Houston State Bearkats football team =

American college football season

2003 Sam Houston State Bearkats football
- Conference: Southland Conference
- Record: 3–8 (2–3 Southland)
- Head coach: Ron Randleman (22nd season)
- Defensive coordinator: Mike Lucas (14th season)
- Home stadium: Bowers Stadium

2003 Southland Conference football standings
	Conf.			Overall
Team	W		L	W		L
No. 8 McNeese State $^	5	–	0	10	–	2
Stephen F. Austin	4	–	1	7	–	4
Northwestern State	2	–	3	7	–	5
Texas State	2	–	3	5	–	7
Sam Houston State	2	–	3	3	–	8
Nicholls State†	0	–	5	0	–	11
$ – Conference champion; ^ – NCAA Division I-AA playoff participant; † – Nicholls State forfeited 5 wins, including 3 conference victories.; Rankings from The Sports Network poll

The 2003 Sam Houston State Bearkats football team represented Sam Houston State University as a member of the Southland Conference during the 2003 NCAA Division I-AA football season. Led by 22nd-year head coach Ron Randleman, the Bearkats compiled an overall record of 3–8 with a mark of 2–3 in conference play, and finished tied for fifth in the Southland.

== Schedule ==
Date	Time	Opponent	Site	Result	Attendance	Source
September 6	7:00 p.m.	Midwestern State (TX)*	Bowers Stadium; Huntsville, TX	W 30–9	10,130	
September 13	2:05 p.m.	at No. 12 Montana*	Washington–Grizzly Stadium; Missoula, MT	L 14–38	23,033	
September 20	6:00 p.m.	at Baylor*	Floyd Casey Stadium; Waco, TX	L 6–27	27,842	
September 27	7:05 p.m.	at UTEP*	Sun Bowl; El Paso, TX	L 14–59	17,211	
October 9	6:00 p.m.	Tarleton State*	Bowers Stadium; Huntsville, TX	L 20–39	1,420	
October 16	7:07 p.m.	Stephen F. Austin	Bowers Stadium; Huntsville, TX (Battle of the Piney Woods)	L 31–34	10,131	
October 25	7:00 p.m.	at No. 1 McNeese State	Cowboy Stadium; Lake Charles, LA	L 37–56	16,767	
November 1	6:00 p.m.	at Nicholls State	John L. Guidry Stadium; Thibodaux, LA	W 12–37 (forfeit win)	6,372	
November 8	2:00 p.m.	Northwestern State	Bowers Stadium; Huntsville, TX	W 29–24	8,129	
November 15	6:07 p.m.	No. 18 Northern Arizona*	Bowers Stadium; Huntsville, TX	L 18–34	2,118	
November 22	6:10 p.m.	at Texas State	Bobcat Stadium; San Marcos, TX (rivalry)	L 28–49	8,991	
*Non-conference game; Rankings from The Sports Network Poll released prior to the game; All times are in Central time
