= 2003 VMI Keydets football team =

American college football season

2003 VMI Keydets football
- Conference: Big South Conference
- Record: 6–6 (2–2 Big South)
- Head coach: Cal McCombs (5th season)
- Offensive coordinator: Jeff Durden (2nd season)
- Defensive coordinator: Johnny Burnett (2nd season)
- Home stadium: Alumni Memorial Field

2003 Big South Conference football standings
	Conf.			Overall
Team	W		L	W		L
Gardner–Webb $	4	–	0	8	–	4
Liberty	3	–	1	6	–	6
VMI	2	–	2	6	–	6
Coastal Carolina	1	–	3	6	–	5
Charleston Southern	0	–	4	1	–	11
$ – Conference champion

The 2003 VMI Keydets football team represented the Virginia Military Institute during the 2003 NCAA Division I-AA football season. It was the Keydets' 113th year of football, and their first season in the Big South Conference.

== Schedule ==
Date	Opponent	Site	Result	Attendance	Source
August 30	at Navy*	Navy–Marine Corps Memorial Stadium; Annapolis, MD	L 10–37	30,129	
September 6	at Davidson*	Richardson Stadium; Davidson, NC	W 31–9	2,116	
September 13	William & Mary*	Alumni Memorial Field; Lexington, VA (rivalry)	L 24–34	7,125	
September 20	Norfolk State*	Alumni Memorial Field; Lexington, VA	W 34–9	7,840	
September 27	Georgetown*	Alumni Memorial Field; Lexington, VA	W 42–14	6,137	
October 4	at Liberty	Williams Stadium; Lynchburg, VA	L 28–31	12,273	
October 11	Charleston Southern	Alumni Memorial Field; Lexington, VA	W 50–7	4,325	
October 18	Gardner–Webb	Alumni Memorial Field; Lexington, VA	L 25–37	4,732	
October 25	at Richmond*	University of Richmond Stadium; Richmond, VA	L 25–35	9,122	
November 1	at Coastal Carolina	Brooks Stadium; Conway, SC	W 19–10	6,849	
November 8	Austin Peay*	Alumni Memorial Field; Lexington, VA	W 48–7	5,872	
November 15	vs. The Citadel*	American Legion Memorial Stadium; Charlotte, NC (Military Classic of the South)	L 23–27	11,336	
*Non-conference game
