= 2003 Southern Jaguars football team =

American college football season

2003 Southern Jaguars football

Black college national champion SWAC champion SWAC West Division champion

SWAC Football Championship Game, W 20–9 vs. Alabama State
- Conference: Southwestern Athletic Conference
- West Division

Ranking
- Sports Network: No. 13
- Record: 12–1 (6–1 SWAC)
- Head coach: Pete Richardson (11th season)
- Home stadium: A. W. Mumford Stadium

2003 Southwestern Athletic Conference football standings
	Conf.			Overall
Team	W		L	W		L
East Division
Alabama State xy	5	–	2	8	–	5
Alcorn State x	5	–	2	7	–	5
Alabama A&M	4	–	3	8	–	4
Jackson State	2	–	5	2	–	10
Mississippi Valley State	1	–	6	2	–	9
West Division
No. 13 Southern xy$	6	–	1	12	–	1
No. 17 Grambling State x	6	–	1	9	–	3
Texas Southern	3	–	4	5	–	6
Arkansas–Pine Bluff	3	–	4	4	–	7
Prairie View A&M	0	–	7	1	–	10
Championship: Southern 20, Alabama State 9
$ – Conference champion; x – Division champion/co-champions; Rankings from The Sports Network Poll

The 2003 Southern Jaguars football team represented Southern University as a member of the Southwestern Athletic Conference (SWAC) during the 2003 NCAA Division I-AA football season. Led by 11th-year head coach Pete Richardson, the Jaguars compiled an overall record of 12–1, with a conference record of 6–1, and finished as SWAC champion after they defeated Alabama State in the SWAC Football Championship Game. At the conclusion of the season, the Jaguars were also recognized as black college national champion.

== Schedule ==
Date	Opponent	Rank	Site	Result	Attendance	Source
August 30	at Mississippi Valley State		Mississippi Veterans Memorial Stadium; Jackson, MS	W 29–0	12,350	
September 6	vs. Prairie View A&M		Independence Stadium; Shreveport, LA (Port City Classic)	W 62–7		
September 13	vs. North Carolina A&T*		Sam Boyd Stadium; Whitney, NV (Las Vegas Football Classic)	W 35–16		
September 27	Alabama State		A. W. Mumford Stadium; Baton Rouge, LA	W 35–10	26,400	
October 4	Arkansas–Pine Bluff	No. 22	A. W. Mumford Stadium; Baton Rouge, LA	W 53–7		
October 11	Alabama A&M	No. 18	A. W. Mumford Stadium; Baton Rouge, LA	W 55–25	26,400	
October 18	at Jackson State	No. 17	Mississippi Veterans Memorial Stadium; Jackson, MS (rivalry)	W 30–20	46,794	
October 25	Alcorn State	No. 14	A. W. Mumford Stadium; Baton Rouge, LA	L 34–36		
November 1	Allen*	No. 18	A. W. Mumford Stadium; Baton Rouge, LA	W 65–0		
November 8	Lincoln (MO)*	No. 16	A. W. Mumford Stadium; Baton Rouge, LA	W 34–7		
November 15	at Texas Southern	No. 17	Robertson Stadium; Houston, TX	W 24–17	28,582	
November 29	vs. No. 12 Grambling State	No. 15	Louisiana Superdome; New Orleans, LA (Bayou Classic)	W 44–41	70,151	
December 13	vs. Alabama State*	No. 13	Legion Field; Birmingham, AL (SWAC Championship Game)	W 20–9	31,617	
*Non-conference game; Rankings from The Sports Network Poll released prior to the game
