= 2003 Norfolk State Spartans football team =

American college football season

2003 Norfolk State Spartans football
- Conference: Mid-Eastern Athletic Conference
- Record: 1–11 (0–8 MEAC)
- Head coach: Willie Gillus (1st season)
- Home stadium: William "Dick" Price Stadium

2003 Mid-Eastern Athletic Conference football standings
	Conf.			Overall
Team	W		L	W		L
No. 16 North Carolina A&T $^	7	–	1	10	–	3
No. 15 Bethune–Cookman ^	6	–	2	9	–	3
South Carolina State	5	–	2	8	–	4
Hampton	5	–	2	7	–	4
Morgan State	4	–	3	6	–	5
Florida A&M	3	–	4	6	–	6
Howard	2	–	5	4	–	7
Delaware State	1	–	6	1	–	10
Norfolk State	0	–	8	1	–	11
$ – Conference champion; ^ – NCAA Division I-AA playoff participant; Rankings from The Sports Network poll

The 2003 Norfolk State Spartans football team represented Norfolk State University as a member of the Mid-Eastern Athletic Conference (MEAC) during the 2003 NCAA Division I-AA football season. Led by first-year head coach Willie Gillus, the Spartans compiled an overall record of 1–11, with a conference record of 0–8, and finished ninth in the MEAC.

== Schedule ==
Date	Opponent	Site	Result	Attendance	Source
August 30	Virginia State*	William "Dick" Price Stadium; Norfolk, VA	L 15–16	16,031	
September 13	at Savannah State*	Ted Wright Stadium; Savannah, GA	W 7–3		
September 20	at VMI*	Alumni Memorial Field; Lexington, VA	L 9–34	7,840	
September 27	No. 6 Bethune–Cookman	William "Dick" Price Stadium; Norfolk, VA	L 14–56		
October 4	North Carolina A&T	William "Dick" Price Stadium; Norfolk, VA	L 14–34		
October 11	at South Carolina State	Oliver C. Dawson Stadium; Orangeburg, SC	L 15–34		
October 18	Hampton	William "Dick" Price Stadium; Norfolk, VA (rivalry)	L 0–52	13,127	
October 25	at Florida A&M	Bragg Memorial Stadium; Tallahassee, FL	L 10–60	26,514	
November 1	Howard	William "Dick" Price Stadium; Norfolk, VA	L 28–42	16,972	
November 8	at Liberty*	Williams Stadium; Lynchburg, VA	L 21–69	5,173	
November 15	at Delaware State	Alumni Stadium; Dover, DE	L 25–36	2,138	
November 22	at Morgan State	Hughes Stadium; Baltimore, MD	L 34–43	4,254	
*Non-conference game; Rankings from The Sports Network Poll released prior to the game
