= Tristan Burge =

American football player and coach (born 1985)

Profile
- Position: Safety

Personal information
- Born: June 4, 1985 (age 41); Romeoville, Illinois
- Listed height: 6 ft 0 in (1.83 m)
- Listed weight: 210 lb (95 kg)

Career information
- College: Eastern Illinois
- NFL draft: 2007: undrafted

Career history
- Green Bay Packers (2007)*; Rock River Raptors CIFL (2008); Bloomington Extreme IFL (2009)
- * Offseason or practice squad member only

Awards and highlights
- All-Ohio Valley First-team Selection 2005, 2006; AP Third-team I-AA All-American 2006; TSN Third-team I-AA All-American 2006

Tristan Burge (born June 4, 1985) is an American former football safety. He was originally signed by the Green Bay Packers as an undrafted free agent in 2007. He played college football at Eastern Illinois. After each of his Junior and Senior years he was named to the All-Conference First-team of the Ohio Valley Conference. He was also named a Third-team I-AA American by both the AP and TSN.

After his stint with the Packers Practice Squad in the Summer of 2007, Burge played two seasons of professional indoor football: with the Rockford, Illinois Rock River Raptors in 2008, and the Bloomington, Illinois Extreme in 2009.

== Coaching career ==
For the 3 seasons between 2009 and 2011 Burge served as assistant coach at Romeoville High School in his home town, where he coached wide receivers and defensive backs.

He moved to Frostburg State for the 2012 season as a Graduate Assistant and coached Defensive Backs as well as the kickers/punters.

For the 2013 season he moved on to the University of Rhode Island to work on the staff of head coach Joe Trainer as cornerbacks coach.

In April 2014, Burge joined the staff of Head Coach Dan McCarney at the University of North Texas as a graduate assistant.
