= Steve Barrows =

American football player and coach

Biographical details
- Education: Ohio (1986)

Coaching career (HC unless noted)
- 1981–1988: Ohio (SA/GA)
- 1989–1990: Jacksonville HS (NC) (assistant)
- 1991: William Penn (assistant)
- 1992–1993: Jacksonville HS (NC) (assistant)
- 1994–1995: Minnesota–Morris (assistant)
- 1995: Minnesota–Morris (interim HC)
- 1996–1998: Bethany (KS) (OC)
- 1999–2002: Anderson (IN)
- 2003–2006: Charleston Southern (DC)
- 2007: Indiana State (DC)
- 2008–2011: Hardin–Simmons (DC)
- 2012: Mount St. Joseph (OC)
- 2013–2014: McKendree (DC)
- 2015–2016: Kentucky Christian

Head coaching record
- Overall: 26–43

Accomplishments and honors

Championships
- 1 HCAC (2001)

Steve Barrows is an American former football player and coach. He most recently served as the head football coach at Kentucky Christian University from 2015 to 2016. He previously held the head coaching positions at Anderson University in Anderson, Indiana from 1999 to 2002 and on an interim basis at the University of Minnesota–Morris in 1995.

== Head coaching record ==
Year	Team	Overall	Conference	Standing	Bowl/playoffs
Minnesota–Morris Cougars (Northern Sun Intercollegiate Conference) (1993–1995)
1995	Minnesota–Morris	0–7 (Note: Jay Mills was head coach for the first three games of the season. Barrows served as interim head coach for the final seven games. Minnesota–Morris finished the year with an overall record of 0–10 and conference mark of 0–6.)	0–5	7th	
Minnesota–Morris:		0–7	0–5		
Anderson Ravens (Heartland Collegiate Athletic Conference) (1999–2002)
1999	Anderson	2–8	2–5	T–5th	
2000	Anderson	4–6	3–3	T–4th	
2001	Anderson	8–2	5–1	T–1st	
2002	Anderson	7–3	5–1	2nd	
Anderson:		21–19	15–10		
Kentucky Christian Knights (Mid-South Conference) (2015–2016)
2015	Kentucky Christian	2–9	2–3	4th (East)	
2016	Kentucky Christian	3–8	3–3	T–4th (East)	
Kentucky Christian:		5–17	5–6		
Total:		26–43			
National championship Conference title Conference division title or championship game berth
