= List of Delaware State Hornets football seasons =

The following is a list of Delaware State Hornets football seasons for the football team that has represented Delaware State University in NCAA competition.

== Results ==
Year	Coach	Overall	Conference	Standing	Bowl/playoffs	Rank^{#}
Coach Unknown (Independent) (1924–1926)
1924	Coach Unknown	0–1				
1925	Coach Unknown	0–2				
1926	Coach Unknown	1–0				
Naylor (Independent) (1927)
1927	Naylor	1–1				
Naylor:		1–1				
Coach Unknown (Independent) (1928–1930)
1928	Coach Unknown	1–1–1				
1929	Coach Unknown	1–0				
1930	Coach Unknown	4–2				
James Powell Calvin (Independent) (1931)
1931	James Powell Calvin	2–2–1				
James Powell Calvin:		2–2–1				
John L. McKinley (Independent) (1932)
1932	John L. McKinley	2–5				
John L. McKinley:		2–5				
Edward L. Jackson (Independent) (1933)
1933	Edward L. Jackson	4–4				
Edward L. Jackson (Middle Atlantic Athletic Association) (1934–1935)
1934	Edward L. Jackson	8–0	6–0	1st		
1935	Edward L. Jackson	7–1	5–0	1st		
Edward L. Jackson:		19–5	11–0			
Butler (Middle Atlantic Athletic Association) (1936)
1936	Butler	2–4 (Note: Results of one game are unknown)	2–2			
Butler:		2–4	2–2			
Coach Unknown (Independent) (1937)
1937	Coach Unknown	1–0				
Turner (Independent) (1938)
1938	Turner	1–2 (Note: Results of one game are unknown.)				
Turner:		1–2				
Coach Unknown (Independent) (1939–1941)
1939	Coach Unknown	2–2				
1940	Did Not Play					
1941	Coach Unknown	1–4 (Note: Some games have unknown results and others are disputed)				
Dyke Smith (Independent) (1942–1943)
1942	Dyke Smith	3–1–1				
1943	Did Not Play					
Thomas R. Conrad (Independent) (1944)
1944	Thomas R. Conrad	2–3				
Thomas R. Conrad (Central Intercollegiate Athletics Association) (1945–1949)
1945	Thomas R. Conrad	4–3	3–3	8th		
1946	Thomas R. Conrad	5–4	3–4	10th	W Florida N&I Flower Bowl	
1947	Thomas R. Conrad	4–4	4–3	8th		
1948	Thomas R. Conrad	4–5	4–4	11th		
1949	Thomas R. Conrad	3–5–1	3–5–1	11th		
Thomas R. Conrad:		22–24–1				
Robert M. White (Central Intercollegiate Athletics Association) (1950)
1950	Robert M. White	2–7–1	2–6–1	14th		
Robert M. White:		2–7–1	2–6–1			
Willard S. Jones (Central Intercollegiate Athletics Association) (1951–1952)
1951	Willard S. Jones	2–7	2–4	13th		
1952	Willard S. Jones	1–7	1–5	13th		
Willard S. Jones:		3–14	3–9			
Edward L. Jackson (Central Intercollegiate Athletics Association) (1953–1955)
1953	Edward L. Jackson	4–4	2–4	14th		
1954	Edward L. Jackson	7–1	5–1	6th		
1955	Edward L. Jackson	7–1	5–1	8th		12th
Edward L. Jackson:		37–11				
Bennie J. George (Central Intercollegiate Athletics Association) (1956–1958)
1956	Bennie J. George	7–1–1	5–0–1	T–1st		
1957	Bennie J. George	6–2	4–2	3rd		
1958	Bennie J. George	3–5	3–4	11th		
Bennie J. George:		16–8–1	12–6–1			
Preston Mitchell (Central Intercollegiate Athletics Association) (1959)
1959	Preston Mitchell	1–7	1–6	17th		
Bennie J. George:		1–7	1–6			
Roy D. Moore (Central Intercollegiate Athletics Association) (1960–1964)
1960	Roy D. Moore	4–4	4–3	8th		
1961	Roy D. Moore	6–3	5–2	6th		
1962	Roy D. Moore	4–5	3–4	12th		
1963	Roy D. Moore	2–5–1	1–5	T–16th		
1964	Roy D. Moore	3–7	3–5	12th		
Roy D. Moore:		19–24–1				
Ulysses S. Washington (Central Intercollegiate Athletics Association) (1965–1966)
1965	Ulysses S. Washington	4–5				
1966	Ulysses S. Washington	3–5				
Ulysses S. Washington:		7–10				
Arnold Jeter (Central Intercollegiate Athletics Association) (1967–1970)
1967	Arnold Jeter	2–6–1				
1968	Arnold Jeter	4–6				
1969	Arnold Jeter	4–5				
1970	Arnold Jeter	6–2				
Arnold Jeter (Mid-Eastern Athletic Conference) (1971–1974)
1971	Arnold Jeter	1–8	1–5	T–6th		
1972	Arnold Jeter	5–4	2–4	T–6th		
1973	Arnold Jeter	0–11	0–6	7th		
1974	Arnold Jeter	3–6	0–6	7th		
Arnold Jeter:		25–48–1				
Edmund Wyche (Mid-Eastern Athletic Conference) (1975–1978)
1975	Edmund Wyche	5–5	2–4	5th		
1976	Edmund Wyche	3–7–1	1–5	T–6th		
1977	Edmund Wyche	7–4	4–2	3rd	L Florida A&M Orange Blossom Classic	
1978	Edmund Wyche	3–7	3–3	3rd		
Edmund Wyche:		18–23–1				
Charles Henderson (Mid-Eastern Athletic Conference) (1979–1980)
1979	Charles Henderson	4–5–1	0–4–1	6th		
1980	Charles Henderson	2–9	0–6	6th		
Charles Henderson:		6–14–1				
Joseph Purzycki (Mid-Eastern Athletic Conference) (1981–1984)
1981	Joseph Purzycki	2–9	1–4	5th		
1982	Joseph Purzycki	4–7	2–3	T–4th		
1983	Joseph Purzycki	7–3–1	3–1	2nd		
1984	Joseph Purzycki	8–2	3–1	2nd		
Joseph Purzycki:		21–21–1				
William Collick (Mid-Eastern Athletic Conference) (1985–1996)
1985	William Collick	9–2	5–0	1st		
1986	William Collick	7–4	3–2	T–6th		
1987	William Collick	9–1	5–0*	1st		
1988	William Collick	5–5	4–2	1st		
1989	William Collick	7–4	5–1	1st		
1990	William Collick	7–3	4–2	3rd		
1991	William Collick	9–2	5–1*	1st		
1992	William Collick	6–5	3–3	T–4th		
1993	William Collick	6–5	4–2	T–2nd		
1994	William Collick	7–4	4–2	2nd		
1995	William Collick	6–5	6–2	T–2nd		
1996	William Collick	3–8	2–5	T–6th		
William Collick:		81–48				
John McKenzie (Mid-Eastern Athletic Conference) (1997–1999)
1997	John McKenzie	3–8	1–6	T–7th		
1998	John McKenzie	0–11	0–8	9th		
1999	John McKenzie	4–7	4–4	T–4th		
John McKenzie:		7–26				
Ben Blacknall (Mid-Eastern Athletic Conference) (2000–2002)
2000	Ben Blacknall	7–4	5–3	T–4th		
2001	Ben Blacknall	5–6	3–5	T–5th		
2002	Ben Blacknall	4–8	2–6	8th		
Ben Blacknall/Butch Posey (Mid-Eastern Athletic Conference) (2003)
2003	Ben Blacknall/Butch Posey*	1–10	1–6	7th		
Ben Blacknall:		16–24	10–19			
Butch Posey:		1–4	1–4			
Alton Lavan (Mid-Eastern Athletic Conference) (2004–2010)
2004	Alton Lavan	4–7	4–3	4th		
2005	Alton Lavan	7–4	6–2	3rd		
2006	Alton Lavan	8–3	6–2	2nd		
2007	Alton Lavan	10–2	9–0	1st	L Delaware Fightin' Blue Hens NCAA FCS First Round	15
2008	Alton Lavan	5–6	5–3	5th		
2009	Alton Lavan	4–7	3–4	6th		
2010	Alton Lavan	3–8	2–6	8th		
Alton Lavan:		41–37	35–20			
Kermit Blount (Mid-Eastern Athletic Conference) (2011–2014)
2011	Kermit Blount	3–8	1–7	9th		
2012	Kermit Blount	6–5	5–3	4th		
2013	Kermit Blount	5–6	5–3	4th		
2014	Kermit Blount	2–10	2–6	T–8th		
Kermit Blount:		16–29	13–19			
Kenny Carter (Mid-Eastern Athletic Conference) (2015–2017)
2015	Kenny Carter	1–10	1–7	T–8th		
2016	Kenny Carter	0–11	0–8	11th		
2017	Kenny Carter	2–9	2–6	T–8th		
Kenny Carter:		3–30	3–21			
Rod Milstead (Mid-Eastern Athletic Conference) (2018–present)
2018	Rod Milstead	3–8	2–5	T–8th		
2019	Rod Milstead	2–10	1–7	9th		
2020	Rod Milstead	2–3	2–2	1st (North)		
2021	Rod Milstead	5–6	2–3	3rd		
2022	Rod Milstead	5–6	2–3	T–3rd		
Rod Milstead:		17–33	9–20			
Lee Hull (Mid-Eastern Athletic Conference) (2023–2024)
2023	Lee Hull	1–10	0–5	6th		
2024	Lee Hull	1–11	0–5	6th		
Lee Hull:		2–21	0–10			
DeSean Jackson (Mid-Eastern Athletic Conference) (2025–present)
2025	DeSean Jackson	8-4	4–1	2nd		
DeSean Jackson:		8-4	4–1			
Total:		384–489–11				
National championship Conference title Conference division title or championship game berth
^{#}Post 1996 rankings from final Sports Network poll.

- In 1987, Delaware State was defeated by Howard 12–7, finishing with a 4–1 record in conference play, second to Howard. Howard was later forced to forfeit all victories that season for using ineligible players, moving Delaware State to 5–0, at which time the MEAC stripped the title and awarded it to Delaware State.
- In 1991, Delaware State was defeated by Bethune-Cookman 28–20, however, it was determined that BCU used an ineligible player and the Wildcats were forced to forfeit the game. The victory gave Delaware State a 5–1 conference record, tying them with North Carolina A&T, who the Hornets had beaten earlier in the season, for a share of the conference championship.
- In 2003, Ben Blacknall coached games 1–6 and was fired with an 0–6 record. Butch Posey was promoted to head coach for games 7–11 and finished with a 1–4 record.
