= 1933 Delaware State Hornets football team =

American college football season

1933 Delaware State Hornets football
- Conference: Middle Atlantic Athletic Association
- Record: 4–4 (3–3 MAAA)
- Head coach: Edward Jackson (2nd season)

The 1933 Delaware State Hornets football team represented State College for Colored Students—now known Delaware State University—as a member of the Middle Atlantic Athletic Association (MAAA) during the 1933 college football season. Led by second-year head coach Edward L. Jackson, Delaware State compiled an overall record of 4–4 with a mark of 3–3 in conference play.

== Schedule ==
Date	Opponent	Site	Result	Source
October 7	Miner Teachers*	Dover, DE	L 0–8	
October 13	Bowie	Dover, DE	L 18–26	
October 21	at Bordentown	Bordentown, NJ	L 0–13	
October 28	Princess Anne	Dover, DE	W 38–0	
November 4	Storer	Dover, DE	W 33–6	
November 11	Cheyney	Dover, DE	L 0–7	
November 17	Howard High School*	Dover, DE	W 18–0	
November 25	at Downingtown	Downingtown, PA	W 7–0	
*Non-conference game
