= 1932 Delaware State Hornets football team =

American college football season

1932 Delaware State Hornets football
- Conference: Middle Atlantic Athletic Association
- Record: 1–5 (1–3 MAAA)
- Head coach: Edward L. Jackson (1st season)

1932 Middle Atlantic Athletic Association football standings
	Conf.					Overall
Team	W		L		T	W		L		T
Cheyney $	4	–	0	–	2	4	–	1	–	2
Downingtown	4	–	0	–	1	6	–	0	–	1
Storer	3	–	0	–	1	4	–	0	–	1
Bordentown	3	–	3	–	0	4	–	4	–	0
Delaware State	1	–	3	–	0	1	–	5	–	0
Bowie	1	–	4	–	0	1	–	6	–	0
Princess Anne	0	–	6	–	0	0	–	6	–	0
$ – Conference champion; Cheyney was declared by the conference champion based on the Dickinson System.

The 1932 Delaware State Hornets football team, also called Dover State, represented State College for Colored Students—now known Delaware State University—as a member of the Middle Atlantic Athletic Association (MAAA) during the 1932 college football season. Led by first-year head coach Edward L. Jackson, Delaware State compiled an overall record of 1–5 with a mark of 1–3 in conference play, placing fifth in the MAAA.

== Schedule ==
Date	Opponent	Site	Result	Source
October 8	Newark Athletic Club*		L 7–29	
October 15	Cheyney	Cheyney, PA	L 12–13	
October 22	Bordentown	Dover, DE	L 7–20	
October 29	Downingtown	Dover, DE	L 0–18	
November 11	at Princess Anne	Princess Anne, MD	W 13–0	
November 18	at Howard High School*	Pennsy Field; Wilmington, DE	L 2–6	
*Non-conference game
