= William A. Creditt =

American minister, educator, school founder (1864–1921)

William Abraham Creditt
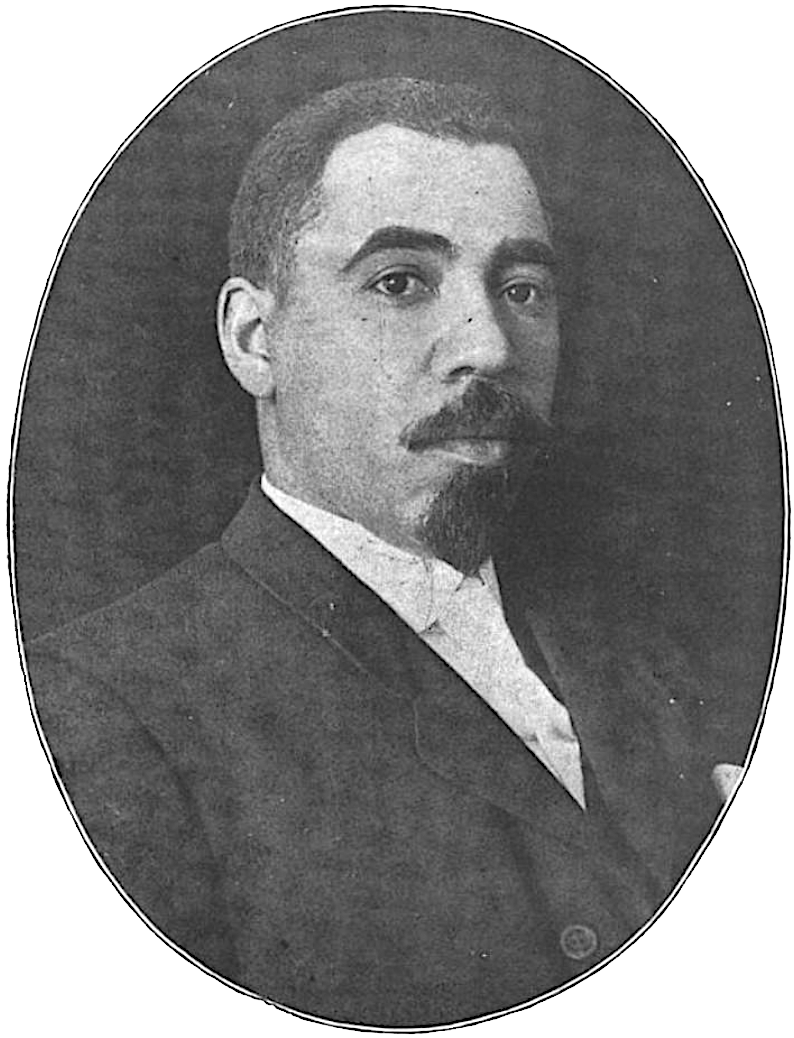
- William Abraham Creditt, c. 1912
- Born: July 14, 1864; Baltimore, Maryland, U.S.
- Died: June 28, 1921 (aged 56); Philadelphia, Pennsylvania, U.S.
- Burial place: Eden Cemetery, Collingdale, Pennsylvania, U.S.
- Other names: William Abraham Credit, Wm. A. Creditt, W. A. Creditt
- Education: Lincoln University (BA, DD, LLD), Newton Theological Institute
- Occupations: Baptist minister, educator, school founder, civil rights activist
- Spouse: Stella Vessells (m. 1890–?)

Rev. William Abraham Creditt (1864 – 1921), was an American Baptist minister, educator, civil rights activist, and school founder. He worked to uplift the African American community. Creditt co-founded the Downingtown Industrial and Agricultural School in Pennsylvania; and was president of the New England Baptist Convention.

== Early life and education ==
William Abraham Creditt was born July 14, 1864, in Baltimore. He was born to free Black parents, Mary (née Lindsey, or O'Neil) and Bushrod Creditt. His brother James O'Neil Creditt was a physician and co-founder of Provident Hospital, and his brother Daniel Creditt was a principal in Baltimore. He attended public school in Baltimore.

Creditt attended Lincoln University in Pennsylvania, where he graduated with a Bachelor of Arts in 1885; followed by study at the Newton Theological Institute (now Andover Newton Theological School) in Newton, Massachusetts, where he graduated in May 1889.

Creditt was bestowed a D.D. degree in 1898 from Lincoln University in Pennsylvania; and a Ph.D. from Guadalupe College in Seguin, Texas, the same year. In 1911, he was granted a LL.D. from Lincoln University in Pennsylvania.

== Career ==
While in college, Creditt was a member of the First African Baptist Church in Philadelphia. By June 1889, Creditt was ordained by the American Baptist Home Mission Board.

Creditt became a professor and preacher at State University at Louisville (now Simmons College of Kentucky). Starting around 1890, he taught at State Normal School for Colored Persons (now Kentucky State University), and preached at the First Corinthian Missionary Baptist Church at Frankfort, Kentucky.

From 1891 until 1897, he preached at Berean Baptist Church in Washington, D.C. Some notable attendees to his sermons included Frederick Douglass, John R. Lynch, and Blanche K. Bruce. Creditt also lectured at Howard University, which eventually was developed into a student training program for ministers.

From 1897 to 1915, Creditt served as the 7th pastor of the Cherry Street Baptist Church (now the First African Baptist Church) in Philadelphia. Creditt founded the Colored Farmers' Alliance of Pennsylvania. For four years he served as president of the New England Baptist Convention, from 1908 until 1912. Creditt also served as the president of the Cherry Building and Loan Association; treasurer of Reliable Mutual Aid Life Insurance Company; and was a member of the Republican State Central Committee from 1911 to 1912.

In 1905, Creditt and John S. Trower founded the Downingtown Industrial and Agricultural School (DIAS) in Downingtown, Chester County, Pennsylvania, an African American vocational training school. Creditt served as the president of the school.

He died on June 28, 1921, in his home in Philadelphia.
