= 1936 Delaware State Hornets football team =

American college football season

1936 Delaware State Hornets football
- Conference: Middle Atlantic Athletic Association
- Record: 2–5 (2–3 MAAA)
- Head coach: Butler (1st season)
- Home stadium: Soldier's Field

1936 Middle Atlantic Athletic Association football standings
| | Conf. | | | | | Overall |
| Team | W | | L | | T | W | | L | | T |
|---|---|---|---|---|---|---|---|---|---|---|
| Cheyney $ | 3 | – | 0 | – | 1 | 4 | – | 1 | – | 1 |
| Bordentown | 3 | – | 1 | – | 0 | ? | – | ? | – | ? |
| Storer | 2 | – | 1 | – | 0 | ? | – | ? | – | ? |
| Downingtown | 2 | – | 2 | – | 0 | ? | – | ? | – | ? |
| Delaware State | 2 | – | 3 | – | 0 | 2 | – | 5 | – | 0 |
| Princess Anne | 0 | – | 2 | – | 0 | ? | – | ? | – | ? |
| Bowie | 0 | – | 3 | – | 0 | ? | – | ? | – | ? |
$ – Conference champion

The 1936 Delaware State Hornets football team represented the State College for Colored Students—now known as Delaware State University—as a member of the Middle Atlantic Athletic Association (MAAA) during the 1936 college football season. Led by coach Butler, Delaware State posted compiled an overall record of 2–5 with a mark of 2–3 in conference play, placing fifth in the MAAA.

== Schedule ==
| Date | Time | Opponent | Site | Result | Source |
|---|---|---|---|---|---|
| October 10 | | at Bowie | Bowie, MD | W 18–0 | |
| October 17 | | Bordentown | Soldier's Field; Dover, DE | W 6–0 | |
| October 23 | 3:00 p.m. | at Miner Teachers* | Howard Stadium; Washington, DC | L 0–20 | |
| October 31 | | at Storer | Harpers Ferry, WV | L 0–12 | |
| November 7 | | at Lincoln (PA)* | Lincoln, PA | L 0–41 | |
| November 14 | | Cheyney | Soldier's Field; Dover, DE | L 0–29 | |
| November 21 | | at Downingtown | Downingtown, PA | L 0–14 | |
*Non-conference game; All times are in Eastern time
