= MAAA =

MAAA can mean:

- Middle Atlantic Athletic Association, American college athletic conference in the 1930s
- Model Aeronautical Association of Australia, Australia's governing body for aeromodelling and model aircraft.
- Montreal Amateur Athletic Association, Canada's oldest athletic association.
- Montserrat Amateur Athletic Association, the governing body for the sport of athletics in Montserrat
- Museo de Arte Acarigua-Araure, an art gallery in Venezuela
- A Member of the American Academy of Actuaries.
