= 1934 Delaware State Hornets football team =

American college football season

1934 Delaware State Hornets football

MAAA champion
- Conference: Middle Atlantic Athletic Association
- Record: 8–0 (7–0 MAAA)
- Head coach: Edward Jackson (3rd season)

1934 Middle Atlantic Athletic Association football standings
	Conf.					Overall
Team	W		L		T	W		L		T
Delaware State $	7	–	0	–	0	8	–	0	–	0
Miner Teachers	2	–	1	–	0	5	–	1	–	0
Downingtown	1	–	1	–	2	1	–	1	–	2
Cheyney	2	–	2	–	0	2	–	5	–	0
Bordentown	2	–	3	–	0	3	–	3	–	0
Bowie	2	–	4	–	1	2	–	4	–	1
Storer	0	–	2	–	1	0	–	2	–	1
Princess Anne	0	–	3	–	0	0	–	3	–	0
$ – Conference champion

The 1934 Delaware State Hornets football team represented the State College for Colored Students—now known as Delaware State University—as a member of the Middle Atlantic Athletic Association (MAAA) during the 1934 college football season. Led by third-year head coach Edward L. Jackson, Delaware State compiled an overall record of 8–0 with a mark of 7–0 in conference play, winning the MAAA title. The Hornets only allowed two points to be scored against them all season and did not allow any touchdowns.

== Schedule ==
Date	Time	Opponent	Site	Result	Source
October 6	2:00 p.m.	at Miner Teachers	Walker Stadium; Washington, DC	W 6–2	
October 13		Bowie	Dover, DE	W 13–0	
October 20		Bordentown	Dover, DE	W 20–0	
October 26		at Princess Anne	Princess Anne, MD	W 1–0 (forfeit)	
November 3		at Storer	Harpers Ferry, WV	W 39–0	
November 10		Cheyney	Dover, DE	W 14–0	
November 17		Lincoln (PA)*	Dover, DE	W 8–0	
November 24		Downingtown	Dover, DE	W 13–0	
*Non-conference game; All times are in Eastern time
