= Arthur Gorrie =

Australian hobbyist (1922–1992)

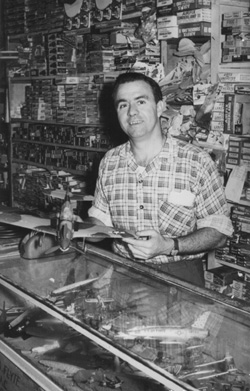
- Arthur Gorrie in his Woolloongabba shop, Gorries Cycles and Hobbies
- Born: Arthur Dingwall Gorrie; 19 May 1922; West End, Brisbane, Australia
- Died: 21 June 1992 (aged 70); Oxley, Brisbane, Australia
- Occupation: Hobby shop proprietor

Arthur Dingwall Gorrie (19 May 1922 – 21 June 1992) was an Australian hobbyist. He ran a small hobby shop in Woolloongabba and was involved with model aeronautical clubs including the Model Aeronautical Association of Australia and the Queensland Model Aeronautical Association from the early 1950s. He was involved with Toastmasters International and was honored by them on many occasions. He became a Distinguished Toastmaster in 1979 and Toastmaster of the Year on eight occasions.

In 1987, the Model Aeronautical Association of Australia inducted Gorrie into their Hall of Fame for his promotion of aeromodelling in Queensland for over thirty years. On 8 June 1992, he was awarded the Medal of the Order of Australia for his services to Toastmasters and the Model Aeronautical Association of Australia.

Gorrie died from a heart attack on 21 June 1992, his family accepted his OAM on his behalf. His work with Toastmasters included helping with the rehabilitation of prisoners in the state's jails, his work in that area led to him being honored by having the Arthur Gorrie Correctional Centre at Wacol named after him when it was opened in late 1992.
