= 1958 Delaware State Hornets football team =

American college football season

1958 Delaware State Hornets football
- Conference: Central Intercollegiate Athletic Association
- Record: 3–5 (3–4 CIAA)
- Head coach: Bennie J. George (3rd season)
- Home stadium: Alumni Stadium

1958 Central Intercollegiate Athletic Association football standings
| | Conf. | | | | | Overall |
| Team | W | | L | | T | W | | L | | T |
|---|---|---|---|---|---|---|---|---|---|---|
| North Carolina A&T $ | 6 | – | 0 | – | 0 | 7 | – | 2 | – | 0 |
| North Carolina College | 5 | – | 1 | – | 0 | 7 | – | 2 | – | 0 |
| Morgan State | 5 | – | 2 | – | 0 | 5 | – | 3 | – | 0 |
| Shaw | 6 | – | 3 | – | 0 | 6 | – | 3 | – | 0 |
| Bluefield State | 4 | – | 2 | – | 0 | 5 | – | 2 | – | 1 |
| St. Augustine's | 6 | – | 2 | – | 0 | 6 | – | 2 | – | 0 |
| Maryland State | 4 | – | 3 | – | 0 | 4 | – | 3 | – | 0 |
| Howard | 4 | – | 2 | – | 0 | 5 | – | 2 | – | 1 |
| Johnson C. Smith | 5 | – | 2 | – | 0 | 6 | – | 2 | – | 0 |
| Hampton | 6 | – | 3 | – | 0 | 7 | – | 3 | – | 0 |
| Delaware State | 3 | – | 4 | – | 0 | 3 | – | 5 | – | 0 |
| Virginia State | 3 | – | 6 | – | 0 | 3 | – | 6 | – | 0 |
| Winston-Salem State | 3 | – | 5 | – | 0 | 3 | – | 5 | – | 1 |
| Elizabeth City State | 2 | – | 5 | – | 0 | 3 | – | 6 | – | 0 |
| Fayetteville State | 1 | – | 7 | – | 0 | 1 | – | 7 | – | 0 |
| Lincoln (PA) | 1 | – | 5 | – | 0 | 1 | – | 7 | – | 0 |
| Virginia Union | 1 | – | 6 | – | 0 | 2 | – | 6 | – | 0 |
| Saint Paul's (VA) | 0 | – | 7 | – | 0 | 0 | – | 8 | – | 0 |
$ – Conference champion

The 1958 Delaware State Hornets football team represented Delaware State College—now known as Delaware State University—as a member of the Central Intercollegiate Athletic Association (CIAA) in the 1958 college football season. Led by coach Bennie J. George in his third and final year, the Hornets compiled a 3–5 record, and were outscored 118–168.

== Schedule ==
| Date | Opponent | Site | Result | Source |
|---|---|---|---|---|
| October 4 | Hampton | Alumni Stadium; Dover, DE | L 14–28 | |
| October 11 | at Howard | Washington, DC | W 20–8 | |
| October 18 | Johnson C. Smith | Alumni Stadium; Dover, DE | L 6–28 | |
| October 25 | at Lincoln (PA) | Lincoln, PA | W 26–8 | |
| November 1 | Saint Paul's (VA) | Alumni Stadium; Dover, DE | W 46–6 | |
| November 8 | at Maryland State | Princess Anne, MD | L 0–44 | |
| November 15 | at King's (PA)* | Wilkes-Barre, PA | L 6–20 | |
| November 22 | at St. Augustine's | Raleigh, NC | L 0–26 | |
*Non-conference game
