= 1957 Delaware State Hornets football team =

American college football season

1957 Delaware State Hornets football
- Conference: Central Intercollegiate Athletic Association
- Record: 6–2 (4–2 CIAA)
- Head coach: Bennie J. George (2nd season)
- Home stadium: Alumni Stadium

1957 Central Intercollegiate Athletic Association football standings
	Conf.					Overall
Team	W		L		T	W		L		T
Maryland State $	6	–	0	–	1	6	–	1	–	1
North Carolina A&T	4	–	2	–	0	4	–	3	–	1
North Carolina College	4	–	3	–	0	5	–	4	–	0
Morgan State	4	–	2	–	1	5	–	3	–	1
Bluefield State	4	–	2	–	0	6	–	2	–	0
Shaw	5	–	3	–	0	5	–	3	–	0
Virginia Union	5	–	3	–	0	6	–	3	–	0
Virginia State	4	–	4	–	0	4	–	4	–	0
Elizabeth City State	4	–	1	–	1	6	–	1	–	1
Winston-Salem State	5	–	3	–	0	5	–	3	–	0
Delaware State	4	–	2	–	0	6	–	2	–	0
Hampton	4	–	5	–	0	4	–	5	–	0
St. Augustine's	2	–	4	–	1	3	–	4	–	1
Lincoln (PA)	2	–	4	–	0	2	–	5	–	0
Howard	2	–	4	–	0	3	–	6	–	0
Fayetteville State	2	–	7	–	0	2	–	7	–	0
Johnson C. Smith	1	–	6	–	0	1	–	6	–	1
Saint Paul's (VA)	0	–	7	–	0	0	–	8	–	0
$ – Conference champion; Conference standings were based on the Dickinson System.

The 1957 Delaware State Hornets football team represented Delaware State College—now known as Delaware State University—as a member of the Central Intercollegiate Athletic Association (CIAA) in the 1957 college football season. Led by coach Bennie J. George in his second season, the Hornets compiled an overall record of 6–2 with a mark of 4–2 in conference play, placing 11th in the CIAA standings, which were based on the Dickinson System.

== Schedule ==
Date	Opponent	Site	Result	Source
September 28	Bloomsburg*	Alumni Stadium; Dover, DE	W 13–0	
October 5	at Hampton	Armstrong Stadium; Hampton, VA	L 0–6	
October 14	at King's (PA)*	Hanover Township, PA	W 20–0	
October 19	at Johnson C. Smith	Charlotte, NC	W 13–7	
October 26	Lincoln (PA)	Alumni Stadium; Dover, DE	W 26–0	
November 2	at Saint Paul's (VA)	Lawrenceville, VA	W 9–0	
November 9	Maryland State	Alumni Stadium; Dover, DE	L 0–21	
November 23	St. Augustine's	Alumni Stadium; Dover, DE	W 13–0	
*Non-conference game
