= 1959 Delaware State Hornets football team =

American college football season

1959 Delaware State Hornets football
- Conference: Central Intercollegiate Athletic Association
- Record: 1–7 (1–6 CIAA)
- Head coach: Preston Mitchell (1st season)
- Home stadium: Alumni Stadium

1959 Central Intercollegiate Athletic Association football standings
	Conf.					Overall
Team	W		L		T	W		L		T
North Carolina A&T $	5	–	0	–	0	6	–	2	–	0
Virginia Union	7	–	0	–	1	7	–	0	–	2
Virginia State	7	–	2	–	0	7	–	2	–	0
St. Augustine's	6	–	2	–	0	7	–	2	–	0
Winston-Salem State	5	–	2	–	0	6	–	2	–	0
Maryland State	6	–	1	–	0	6	–	1	–	1
Johnson C. Smith	5	–	4	–	0	5	–	4	–	0
North Carolina College	3	–	3	–	0	4	–	4	–	1
Saint Paul's (VA)	3	–	4	–	0	3	–	4	–	0
Hampton	4	–	4	–	0	4	–	4	–	1
Elizabeth City State	3	–	5	–	0	3	–	6	–	0
Howard	2	–	4	–	0	3	–	5	–	0
Lincoln (PA)	2	–	4	–	0	3	–	6	–	0
Fayetteville State	1	–	6	–	0	1	–	7	–	0
Shaw	1	–	6	–	1	1	–	6	–	1
Bluefield State	1	–	4	–	0	3	–	6	–	0
Delaware State	1	–	6	–	0	1	–	7	–	0
Morgan State	1	–	6	–	0	1	–	6	–	1
$ – Conference champion

The 1959 Delaware State Hornets football team represented Delaware State College—now known as Delaware State University—as a member of the Central Intercollegiate Athletic Association (CIAA) in the 1959 college football season. Led by coach Preston Mitchell in his only season, the Hornets compiled a 1–7 record, being outscored 72 to 155.

== Schedule ==
Date	Opponent	Site	Result	Attendance	Source
October 3	at Hampton	Armstrong Stadium; Hampton, VA	L 8–26	6,000	
October 10	Howard	Alumni Stadium; Dover, DE	L 6–14		
October 17	at Johnson C. Smith	Charlotte, NC	L 0–42		
October 24	Lincoln (PA)	Alumni Stadium; Dover, DE	W 38–13		
October 31	at Saint Paul's (VA)	Lawrenceville, VA	L 8–14		
November 7	Maryland State	Alumni Stadium; Dover, DE	L 0–26		
November 14	at King's (PA)*	Wilkes-Barre, PA	L 6–8		
November 21	St. Augustine's	Alumni Stadium; Dover, DE	L 6–12		
*Non-conference game
