= 1935 Delaware State Hornets football team =

American college football season

1935 Delaware State Hornets football

MAAA champion
- Conference: Middle Atlantic Athletic Association
- Record: 7–1 (5–0 MAAA)
- Head coach: Edward Jackson (4th season)

The 1935 Delaware State Hornets football team represented the State College for Colored Students—now known as Delaware State University—as a member of the Middle Atlantic Athletic Association (MAAA) during the 1935 college football season. Led by fourth-year head coach Edward L. Jackson, Delaware State compiled an overall record of 7–1 with a mark of 5–0 in conference play, winning the MAAA title for the second consecutive season.

== Schedule ==
Date	Opponent	Site	Result	Source
October 5	at Virginia State*	Rogers Athletic Field; Petersburg, VA	L 0–6	
October 12	at Cheyney	Cheyney, PA	W 7–0	
October 19	at Bordentown	Bordentown, NJ	W 39–0	
October 25	Miner Teachers*	Dover, DE	W 24–13	
November 2	Storer	Dover, DE	W 51–0	
November 9	at Princess Anne	Princess Anne, MD	W 42–0	
November 16	at Lincoln (PA)*	Oxford, PA	W 13–6	
November 23	Downingtown	Dover, DE	W 26–0	
*Non-conference game
