= Ethel Cuff Black =

American educator and sorority founder (1890–1977)

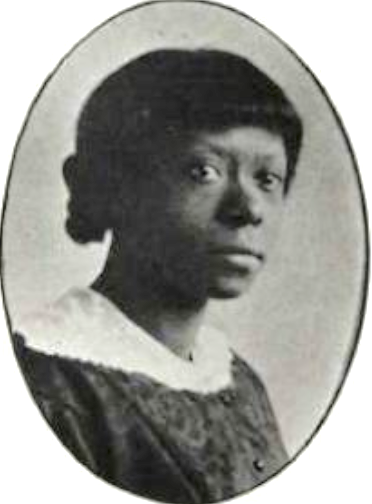
- Howard University yearbook, 1915
- Born: Ethel L. Cuff; October 17, 1890; Wilmington, Delaware, U.S.
- Died: September 17, 1977 (aged 86); Flusing, New York, U.S.
- Burial place: Cypress Hill Cemetery
- Education: Bordentown School; Howard University (B.A., 1915)
- Occupation: Educator
- Employers: Public School 108; Delaware State College
- Known for: Founder of Delta Sigma Theta

Ethel Cuff Black (October 17, 1890 – September 17, 1977) was an American educator and one of the founders of Delta Sigma Theta sorority. She was the first Black American school teacher in Richmond County, New York.

== Early life ==
Ethel L. Cuff was born in Wilmington, Delaware in 1890. Her father was Richard Cuff, a banker and business owner, which allowed her to grow up in the top tier of the Black American community. Her grandparents were landowners and second-generation freedmen. Her maternal grandfather was a Civil War veteran. She attended public schools in Wilmington. She attended the Industrial School for Colored Youth in Bordentown, New Jersey.

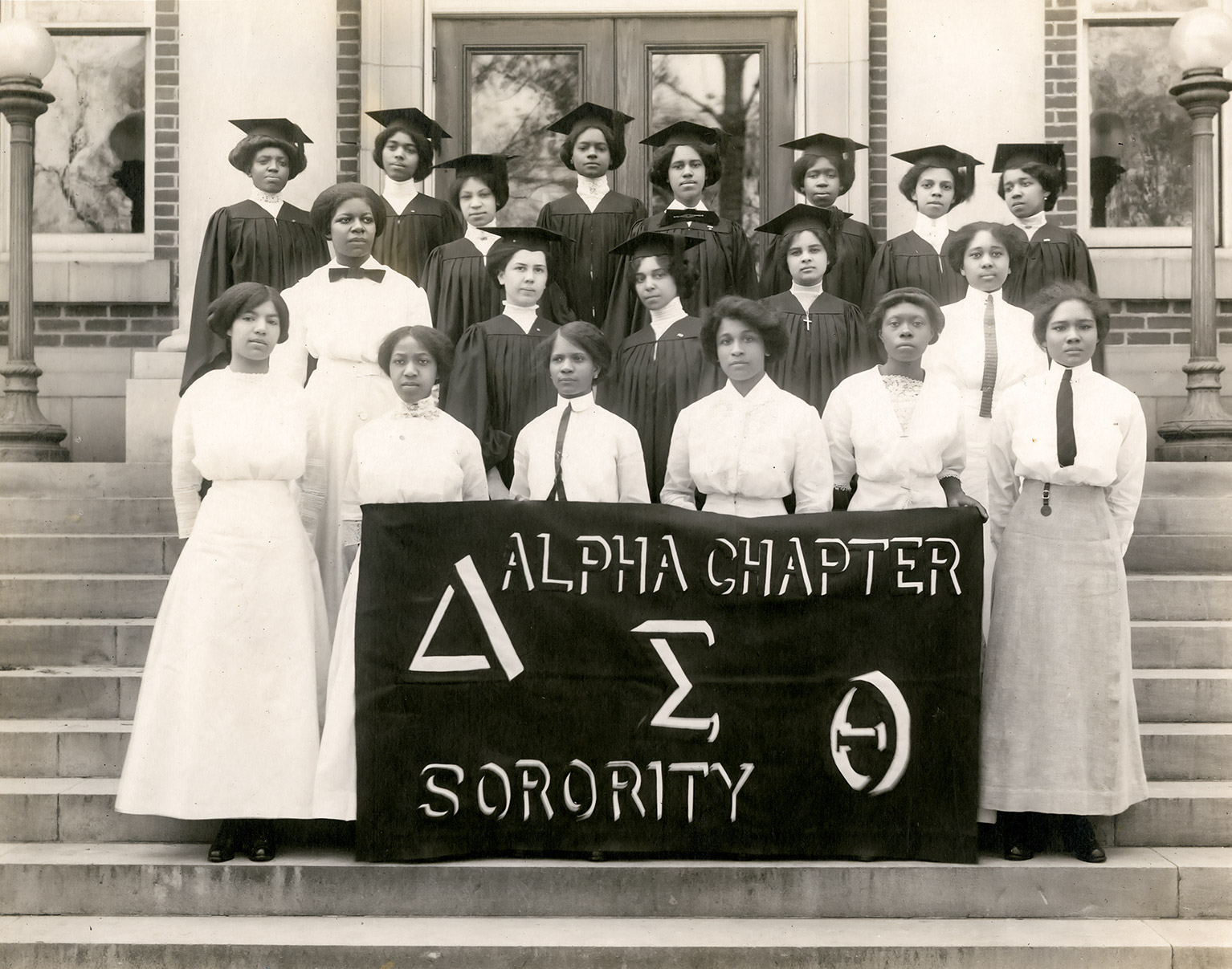
Delta Sigma Theta founders, 1913, at Howard University. Ethel Cuff: second from right, front row.

She attended Howard University, graduating with a degree in education in 1915. At Howard, she was a member of the choir, the chair of the Howard chapter of the YWCA, and vice president of Alpha Kappa Alpha sorority. In 1913, she and 21 other sorority sisters voted to withdraw and from Alpha Kappa Alpha and establish a new sorority, Delta Sigma Theta, that was devoted to community service and social activism. She was the new sorority's vice president.

== Career ==
After college, Black taught in Kentucky; Sedalia, Missouri, and Oklahoma City, Oklahoma. She became the first Black American teacher at Public School 108 (P. S. 108) in Richmond Hills, Queens, New York, teaching there for more than 27 years.

Black worked for the United States Census Bureau in Washington, D.C. from 1920 to 1922 and in Trenton, New Jersey from the summer of 1928 to the summer of 1928. She became a faculty member of Delaware State College in 1922 until 1930 and retired from teaching in 1957.

== Honors ==
Black was honored by Delta Sigma Theta at its 60th National Founders Day ceremony. Although she was too ill to attend the ceremony, it was recorded for her. After her death, the Wilmington, Delaware alumnae chapter established a local Kiwanis library in her honor. In 2013, she was included in a United States Senate resolution that congratulated Delta Sigma Theta for 100 years of service.

In 2023, the eastern end of Foch Boulevard, between 170th Street and Merrick Boulevard, near Roy Wilkins Park, was co-named in her honor.

== Personal life ==
Black lived in Jamaica, New York for forty years. She married real estate agent David Horton Black in 1939. He pre-deceased her.

In June 1951, she helped formed the Queens Alumnae chapter of Delta Sigma Theta.

In 1974, she moved into the Franklin Nursing Home in Flushing, New York. In 1977, she died there at the age of 86. Her funeral services were held at St. Albans Congressional Church. She was buried in Cypress Hill Cemetery in Brooklyn, New York.
