= Arthur Gorrie Correctional Centre =

Prison in Brisbane, Australia

Coordinates: 27°34′47.83″S 152°56′02.18″E

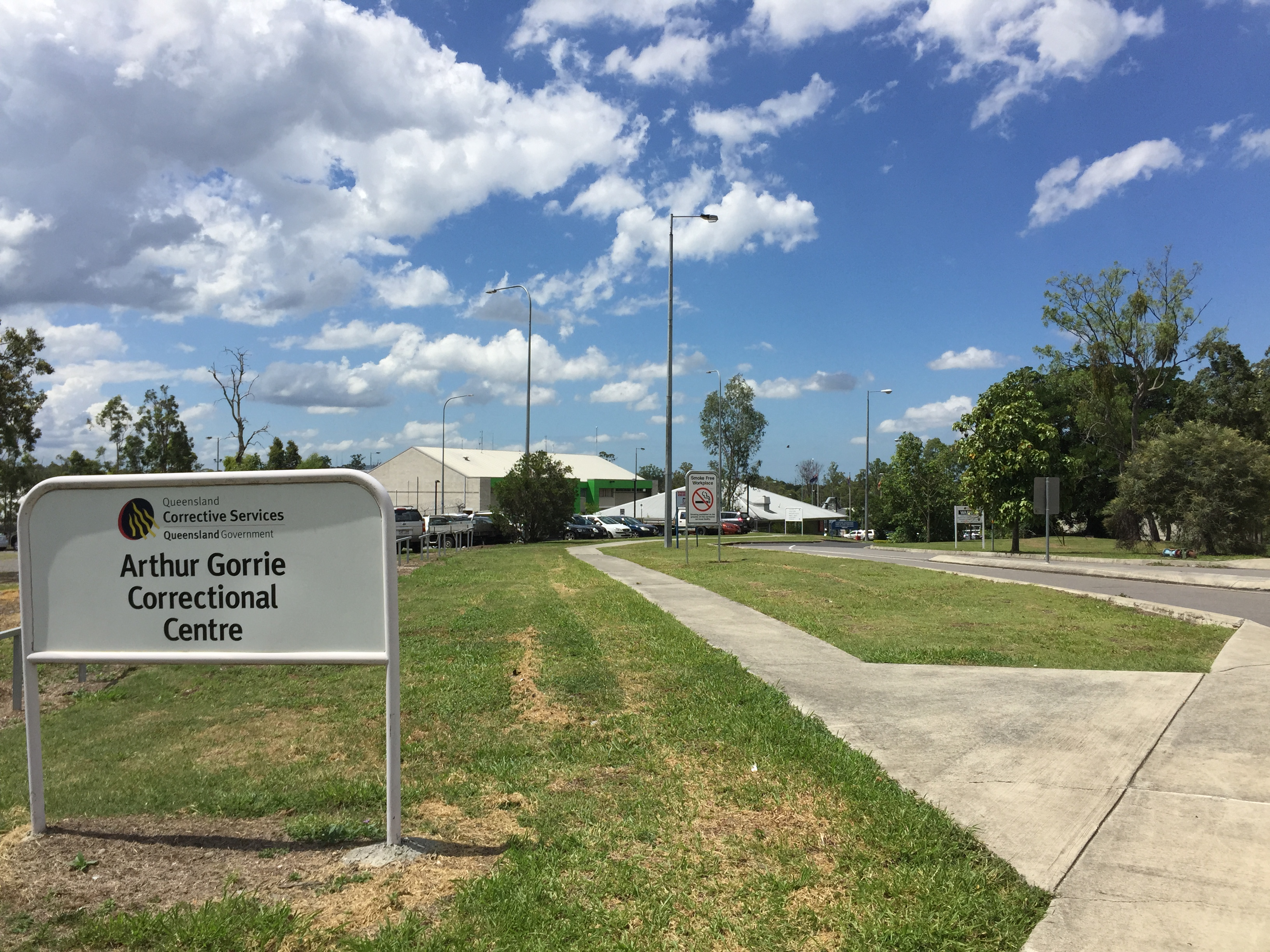
- Arthur Gorrie Correctional Centre, 2015
- Interactive map of Arthur Gorrie Correctional Centre
- Location: 3068 Ipswich Road, Wacol, Queensland
- Status: Operational
- Security class: High Security
- Capacity: 1580 (as of March 2025)
- Opened: 1992
- Managed by: Queensland Corrective Services

Arthur Gorrie Correctional Centre is a high security remand centre for males, primarily accommodating individuals who a judge or magistrate has ordered to be held in custody as they await, and during, trial. The centre is located on the Ipswich Motorway at Wacol in the south-western suburbs of Brisbane, Australia. It is the second largest correctional centre in Queensland housing approximately 1520 Prisoners. The centre's Maximum Security Unit was closed on 1 March 2013, then reopened with the take over of Queensland Corrective Services with a current state of 9.

The centre is relatively modern with televisions, showers and toilets in all cells and air conditioning in new stock cells and units, whilst old stock cells and units remain non air conditioned

Managed by the Queensland Corrective Services the Arthur Gorrie Correctional Centre was the second of Queensland's privately operated non-government prisons (previously managed by GEO Group), sharing the notation with the Southern Queensland Correctional Centre (previously managed by Serco). Both of which were announced to be transitioned to be managed by Queensland Corrective Services in 2019.

The facility is named after Arthur Gorrie.

In June 2018, the contract for the facility was up for tender.

In 2020, after more than 28 years, Arthur Gorrie Correctional Centre transitioned from GEO Group services to Queensland Corrective Services.

== Violence and overcrowding ==
In June 2018, a report by the Australian Broadcasting Corporation revealed widespread inmate violence, overcrowding and brutality by prison guards at Arthur Gorrie Correctional Centre. The rate of prisoner assault in 2016 was more than twice that of the next most violent prison in the country.

== Notable prisoners ==
- John Howard Amundsen
- Peter Foster

== See also ==
- Punishment in Australia
