= Preston Mitchell =

American football coach, athletics administrator, educator (1914–1989)

Biographical details
- Born: May 6, 1914
- Died: November 30, 1989 (aged 75); Nashville, Tennessee, U.S.

Coaching career (HC unless noted)
- 1948–?: Stephens-Lee HS (NC)
- 1959: Delaware State

Administrative career (AD unless noted)
- 1954–1956: Fisk
- 1956–1962: Delaware State

Head coaching record
- Overall: 1–7 (college)

Edward Preston Mitchell III (May 6, 1914 – November 30, 1989) was an American football coach, college athletics administrator, and educator. He served as the head football at Delaware State University for one season, in 1959, compiling a record of 1–7. Mitchell came to Delaware State in 1956 when he was appointed as athletic director and head of the Department of Health and Physical Education. He had previously been athletic director and head of the Department of Health and Physical Education at Fisk University for two years.

A native of Philadelphia, Mitchell graduated from Central High School. He attended Knoxville College and Temple University before serving in the United States Army in Africa and Europe during World War II. Mitchell earned a Bachelor of Arts degree at North Carolina College at Durham—now known as North Carolina Central University—and a Master of Arts degree and a Doctor of Philosophy degree at the University of Iowa. In 1948, he was hired as the football coach at Stephens-Lee High School in Asheville, North Carolina. Mitchell also taught physical education at Stephens-Lee.

In 1962, Mitchell was hired as the head of the physical education department at Tennessee State University. He died on November 30, 1989, at Hubbard Hospital in Nashville, Tennessee, after suffering from cancer. Mitchell was buried at Nashville National Cemetery on December 4, 1989.

== Head coaching record ==
=== College ===
Year	Team	Overall	Conference	Standing	Bowl/playoffs
Delaware State Hornets (Central Intercollegiate Athletic Association) (1959)
1959	Delaware State	1–7	1–6	T–17th	
Delaware State:		1–7	1–6		
Total:		1–7			
