= James N. H. Waring =

American educator and physician

James H. N. Waring, also known as J. H. N. Waring, (Note: He is also commonly referred to as Dr. James Waring.) (September 22, 1861 – December 29, 1923) was an educator and physician who practiced in Washington, D.C., and Baltimore, Maryland. He implemented trade courses in Baltimore and studied societal pressures on African Americans. During World War I, he treated soldiers at Camp Devens during the Spanish flu epidemic. He sat on the Board of Trustees of his alma mater, Howard University.

== Early life and education ==
James Henry Nelson Waring was born in Niles, Michigan on September 22, 1861, to Amanda Fitzallen (nee Hill) Waring, the daughter of Henry Nelson Hill, and Reverend William Waring. (Note: One source states that his father's name is James, but census and other public records state that his father's name is William.) William Waring attended schools in Oberlin, Ohio, and was a Howard University educated lawyer and a minister. During the Civil War, he was a chaplain of the Michigan Volunteers. He became the Berean Baptist Church's first pastor. He was a co-founder of the country's first black bank, Capital Savings Bank. He was on the board of trustees at Howard University. James' great uncle was Arthur Waring, a member of the American Society of Free Persons of Color (1830).

Waring's siblings were Charles, Robert Louis, Lavinia, Hattie, Bert, and Alice. He attended public schools in his birth state and in Oberlin, Ohio and taught school first in St. Louis, Missouri, at the age of 15. He received his A.B. in 1877 and M.D. degree in 1888 from Howard University. In 1897, Howard awarded him a Master's degree.

== Career ==
Waring was an educator and supervisor in Washington, D.C., schools for about 23 years, from 1879 to 1891. He then became a principal of the Colored High School in Baltimore and then a supervising principal of Baltimore's colored schools and the Teacher's Training School. He developed carpentry, cooking, drawing, sewing, and printing courses for the colored schools, which were subsequently added to the curriculum of the city's white schools.

He recognized that there was unfounded fear of African Americans by whites and that African Americans were more likely to be charged with minor offenses, which led to friction between the police and African Americans. Waring, a member of the Colored Law and Order League, was concerned with the living conditions and social constructs of the lives of African Americans. The group was founded by "prominent black" physicians, lawyers, educators, and business leaders. He researched the problems of African Americans in Baltimore and wrote Some Causes of Criminality Among Colored People, about the effect of poor living conditions. He found that there was a lack of conscience in the greater community that allowed for children "to live [where] sunlight, pure air, pure thoughts, chaste conduct and associates… are denied them from their very birth" and were a breeding ground for lawlessness. He established the first Boy Scout troop for African American children in the District of Columbia.

Waring also practiced medicine in the District of Columbia, was superintendent of Camp Pleasant, and worked with the Associated Charities of the District. He operated a free medical clinic in the People's Congregational Church and was a physician at Howard University. In 1916, he became the principal of the Howard Orphanage Industrial School in Kings Park, Long Island, New York. He was the educational secretary and physician during the Spanish flu epidemic at Camp Devens in Massachusetts during World War I. After the war, he practiced medicine in Hopkinton, Massachusetts before he moved to Downington, Pennsylvania and worked at the Industrial School for Boys. He sat on the Board of Trustees for Howard University, with his term ending in 1920.

== Personal life ==
Waring was married in Washington, D.C., on April 4, 1883, to Carrie Brown, also known as Caroline Brown. They had seven children, six of whom were Roberta, Regendia, James, Dorothy, Mary, and Alfred. (Note: Regendia and Alfred were not mentioned in the obituary for James Waring, and may have predeceased their father. His daughter's married names were Roberta W. Booker, Dorothy W. Howard, and Mary W. Steele.) James N. H. Waring, Jr. was also an educator who also secured the position of principal at the Downingtown Industrial and Agricultural School in Downington, Chester County, Pennsylvania. Dorothy, who married Dr. William J. Howard (son of humanitarian and activist Reverend William James Howard), established in 1929 one of the first private nursery schools, The Garden of Children.

Waring died on December 29, 1923, in Cochituate, within Wayland, Massachusetts. Caroline died on February 16, 1927, in Youngstown, Ohio.
