= John Howard Amundsen =

Australian detainee

John Howard Amundsen (born 1966) was the first Queenslander to be charged under national anti-terrorist laws in Australia. These charges were later dropped.

== Background ==
Amundsen has no children and lived with his mother in their Aspley home prior to his arrest. He was a teacher at Ferny Grove State High School and taught the subjects of manual arts, media and business. He had a previous career as a spokesman for Brisbane Airport.

After being assessed by a psychologist, he was found to have autism spectrum disorder. A report stated he often retreated into fantasy worlds, had trouble thinking rationally, lacked social skills, and needed psychotherapy to assist his issues with anxiety and depression.

== Criminal charges ==
=== 2006 terrorism charges ===
Amundsen gained notoriety in May 2006, after a stockpile of explosives and detonators were found in his home which caused the school he worked at to be evacuated and searched. On 10 May 2006, the school was closed for most of the morning as police with sniffer dogs checked classrooms, before they declared it safe for students and staff to resume lessons. In a Brisbane court on 11 May 2006, he was charged with fraudulently obtaining 53 kg of the explosive substance Powergel. He was subsequently charged with preparing a terrorist act, as well as two counts of making a threat and making a hoax threat. Amundsen was held at the Arthur Gorrie Correctional Centre in Wacol.

In February 2007, the charges of terrorism and making a hoax threat were dropped but replaced with new charges of possessing incendiary devices and having dangerous goods in a vehicle. In February 2008, he was jailed for six years for offences surrounding a plot to scare the parents of his ex-girlfriend so that he would win back their daughter. He pleaded guilty to making threats and possession of dangerous goods and weapons. Taking into account the 22 months spent in pre-sentence custody, Amundsen was released on parole in May 2009.

=== 2010 stalking allegations ===
In February 2010, Amundsen was charged with stalking after the alleged victim found a GPS tracking device on her car. The alleged victim was the sister of the same ex-girlfriend Amundsen had attempted to win back with his 2006 bomb scare. Police were convinced Amundsen was responsible.

=== 2014 stalking conviction ===
In 2014, Amundsen was found guilty of unlawful stalking of his former partner stemming back to 2011. While pretending to be someone else, he had called, emailed and sent friend requests to her on social media. Amundsen represented himself in court and pleaded not guilty. Amundsen was sentenced to three-and-a-half years in jail, but with time served his parole eligibility was set at 1 March 2015. He received a five-year restraining order from his victim and her daughters. Amundsen told jurors that they had "failed a good, decent, Christian man" after they handed down the guilty verdict. Amundsen believed the case against him was a feminist plot.
