= Bennie J. George =

American sports coach (1919–1986)

Biographical details
- Born: June 27, 1919; Atlanta, Georgia, U.S.
- Died: August 4, 1986 (aged 67); Dover, Delaware, U.S.

Playing career

Football
- c. 1942–1945: Delaware State

Basketball
- c. 1945: Delaware State

Baseball
- c. 1945: Delaware State

Coaching career (HC unless noted)

Football
- 1955: Delaware State (assistant)
- 1956–1958: Delaware State

Basketball
- 1956–1971: Delaware State

Baseball
- 1957–1959: Delaware State

Head coaching record
- Overall: 16–8–1 (football); 155–152 (basketball); 23–15 (baseball)

Accomplishments and honors

Championships
- Football; CIAA (1956)

Bennie Johnson "Catfish" George (June 28, 1919 – August 4, 1986) was an American football, basketball, and baseball coach. He served as the head football coach at Delaware State University from 1956 to 1958, compiling a record of 16–8–1. As the first basketball head coach in Delaware State history, George led the Hornets for 14 seasons, from 1956 to 1971, and amassing a record of 155–152. He is still the longest tenured coach in program history and was passed in 2010 by Greg Jackson for most wins. A native of Atlanta, Georgia, George attended Morehouse College and Delaware State. He worked as an assistant football coach at Delaware State in 1955 under his predecessor as head coach, Edward Jackson.

George graduated from Booker T. Washington High School in Atlanta and then served in the United States Army during World War II. He came to Delaware state in 1943 as a student and played football, basketball, and baseball before graduating in 1947. George joined Delaware State's faculty in 1949 as physical education instructor. He was later promoted to associate professor and then to head of the health and education department, serving in the later post until his retirement in 1979. George died of pneumonia, on August 4, 1986, at Kent General Hospital in Dover, Delaware.

He was inducted into the Delaware Sports Hall of Fame in 1987.

== Head coaching record ==
=== Football ===
| Year | Team | Overall | Conference | Standing | Bowl/playoffs |
|---|---|---|---|---|---|
Delaware State Hornets (Central Intercollegiate Athletic Association) (1956–1959)
| 1956 | Delaware State | 7–1–1 | 5–0–1 | T–1st | |
| 1957 | Delaware State | 6–2 | 4–2 | 3rd | |
| 1958 | Delaware State | 3–5 | 3–4 | 11th | |
| Delaware State: | | 16–8–1 | 12–6–1 | | |
| Total: | | 16–8–1 | | | |
National championship Conference title Conference division title or championship game berth
