= Shaheer McBride =

American football player (born 1985)

No. 81
- Position: Wide receiver

Personal information
- Born: February 8, 1985 (age 41); Chester, Pennsylvania, U.S.
- Listed height: 6 ft 2 in (1.88 m)
- Listed weight: 205 lb (93 kg)

Career information
- College: Delaware State
- NFL draft: 2008: undrafted

Career history
- Philadelphia Eagles (2008–2009)*; Hartford Colonials (2010)
- * Offseason or practice squad member only

Awards and highlights
- MEAC Rookie of the Year (2004); 2× First-team All-MEAC (2005–2006); Second-team All-MEAC (2007)

Shaheer McBride (born February 8, 1985) is an American former football wide receiver. He was signed by the Philadelphia Eagles as an undrafted free agent in 2008. He played college football at Delaware State.

McBride has also played for the Hartford Colonials.

== College career ==
McBride played four seasons at Delaware State University, where he finished 2nd in all-time catches, and 3rd in all-time yards.

== Professional career ==
After going undrafted in the 2008 NFL draft, McBride was signed by the Philadelphia Eagles as an undrafted free agent. He spent the entire 2008 season on the team's practice squad.

McBride was waived by the Eagles on August 25, 2009.
