= 1956 Delaware State Hornets football team =

American college football season

1956 Delaware State Hornets football

CIAA co-champion
- Conference: Central Intercollegiate Athletic Association
- Record: 7–1–1 (5–0–1 CIAA)
- Head coach: Bennie J. George (1st season)

1956 Central Intercollegiate Athletic Association football standings
| | Conf. | | | | | Overall |
| Team | W | | L | | T | W | | L | | T |
|---|---|---|---|---|---|---|---|---|---|---|
| North Carolina College + | 5 | – | 0 | – | 2 | 5 | – | 2 | – | 2 |
| Delaware State + | 5 | – | 0 | – | 1 | 7 | – | 1 | – | 1 |
| Morgan State + | 5 | – | 0 | – | 1 | 5 | – | 2 | – | 1 |
| Maryland State | 5 | – | 1 | – | 1 | 6 | – | 2 | – | 1 |
| St. Augustine's | 5 | – | 1 | – | 1 | 6 | – | 1 | – | 1 |
| Bluefield State | 5 | – | 1 | – | 0 | 6 | – | 3 | – | 0 |
| Fayetteville State | 4 | – | 2 | – | 0 | 4 | – | 3 | – | 0 |
| Virginia Union | 4 | – | 3 | – | 0 | 6 | – | 3 | – | 0 |
| North Carolina A&T | 3 | – | 3 | – | 0 | 4 | – | 4 | – | 0 |
| Winston-Salem State | 3 | – | 3 | – | 1 | 4 | – | 4 | – | 1 |
| Shaw | 3 | – | 4 | – | 1 | 3 | – | 4 | – | 1 |
| Hampton | 2 | – | 7 | – | 1 | 2 | – | 7 | – | 1 |
| Johnson C. Smith | 2 | – | 5 | – | 0 | 3 | – | 5 | – | 0 |
| Virginia State | 1 | – | 6 | – | 1 | 1 | – | 7 | – | 1 |
| Lincoln (PA) | 1 | – | 6 | – | 0 | 1 | – | 6 | – | 0 |
| Howard | 1 | – | 5 | – | 0 | 4 | – | 5 | – | 0 |
| Saint Paul's (VA) | 0 | – | 7 | – | 0 | 1 | – | 7 | – | 0 |
+ – Conference co-champions

The 1956 Delaware State Hornets football team represented Delaware State College—now known as Delaware State University—as a member of the Central Intercollegiate Athletic Association (CIAA) in the 1956 college football season. Led by coach Bennie J. George in his first year, the Hornets compiled a 7–1–1 record, winning the second conference title in school history. Their victory over Maryland State was the Hawks' first ever conference loss.

== Schedule ==
| Date | Opponent | Site | Result | Attendance | Source |
|---|---|---|---|---|---|
| September 22 | at Cheyney* | Cheyney, PA | W 27–0 | | |
| September 29 | at Bloomsburg* | Bloomsburg, PA | L 0–13 | | |
| October 6 | Hampton | Dover, DE | W 46–6 | | |
| October 13 | Johnson C. Smith | Dover, DE | W 32–0 | | |
| October 20 | at Lincoln (PA) | Lincoln, PA | W 50–0 | | |
| October 27 | at Saint Paul's (VA) | Lawrenceville, VA | W 28–0 | | |
| November 3 | at Maryland State | Princess Anne, MD | W 12–7 | 1,200 | |
| November 10 | at King's (PA) | Wilkes-Barre, PA | W 26–13 (Note: The Morning News reported 26–13, the College Football Data Warehouse lists 27–13, and the Wilkes-Barre Record reported 27–13.) | 800 | |
| November 17 | at St. Augustine's | Raleigh, NC | T 13–13 | | |
*Non-conference game
