= First African Baptist Church (Philadelphia) =

Church in Philadelphia

Coordinates: 39°56′25″N 75°10′11″W

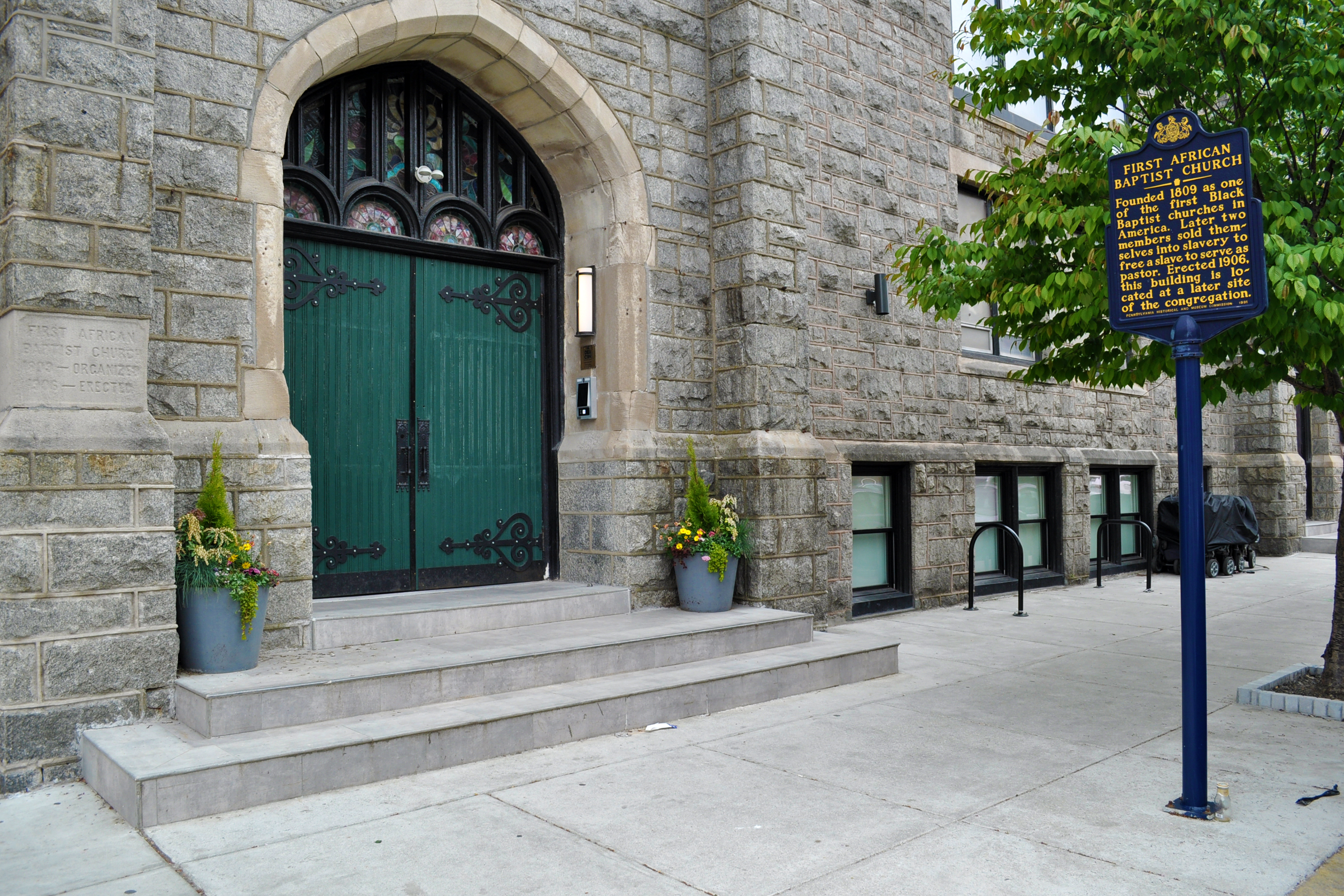
First African Baptist Church, 16th & Christian, with historical marker in the foreground. Built in 1906. Designated on the National Historical Register.

The First African Baptist Church is a church located in South Philadelphia, Pennsylvania founded in 1809.

== History ==
It was the first African American Baptist congregation in Philadelphia and Pennsylvania, and the fifth African American congregation to be founded in Philadelphia (after the African Episcopal Church of St. Thomas and Mother Bethel A.M.E. Church, both in 1794; Zoar Methodist Episcopal Church, 1796; and First African Presbyterian Church, 1807). It was founded by 13 former congregants of the primarily white First Baptist Church of Philadelphia whom were ex-slaves from the eastern shore of Virginia. The split was cordial with the Church being immediately recognized by the Philadelphia Baptist Association. The church went through three locations in the Spring Garden neighborhood, and then to a location in the current Chinatown neighborhood of Philadelphia.

Membership again outgrew their building and in 1902 the congregation purchased a lot at 16th & Christian Streets from the estate of brick manufacturer, James J. Milnamow for $16,500 (approximately $560,000 in 2022 dollars). This street was lined with upper middle class African American homes in an area now known as the Christian Street Black Doctors’ Row Historic District. The congregants hired architecture firm Watson & Huckel in 1904 and the church was finished construction by 1906. The Church was an important part of the Black community at this time. It helped establish the Reliable Mutual Aid Society and the Cherry Building and Loan Association to help African American residents get insurance and mortgage loans, and the Downingtown Industrial and Agricultural School, a nonprofit boarding school that provided vocational education to poor African American children.

The building featured a 96-foot tall Bell tower that suffered damage in the 1950's from a lightning strike and eventually became structurally unsound in the early 2000's after damage from Hurricane Floyd in 1999. The building had a Pennsylvania Historical marker installed in 1991. The building was used by the church for 109 years until 2015 when it was deemed unsafe due to a collapsing east wall. The building received historical designation and protection the same year. Due to an inability to pay for the repairs to the historic building the church decided to sell to private developers. Pastor Terrence Griffith identified that church membership had waned in recent years, and stated "gentrification is really the cause for a lot of churches from South Philly moving." The building is now a boutique hotel and event space.

In 2017 The First African Baptist Church officially opened at its new location at 67th & Lansdowne Ave. in West Philadelphia. Since the move the congregation has doubled in size from 100 to about 200, with more young membership added.
