= Australian Sport Aviation Confederation =

Sports governing body in Australia

- Sport: Air sports
- Jurisdiction: Australia
- Abbreviation: ASAC
- Founded: 1989
- Affiliation: Fédération Aéronautique Internationale
- Affiliation date: 2007
- Headquarters: Melbourne, Victoria

Official website
- www.asac.asn.au
- (Australia)

Australian Sport Aviation Confederation is the governing body for the sport of Air sports in Australia.

== Structure ==
The national body has eight state member associations:

- Australian Aerobatic Club
- Australian Ballooning Federation
- Australian Parachute Federation
- Hang Gliding Federation of Australia
- Gliding Federation of Australia
- Model Aeronautical Association of Australia
