= Gliding Federation of Australia =

Governing body for the sport of gliding in Australia

- Jurisdiction: Australia
- Founded: 1949
- (Australia)

Gliding Federation of Australia, also known as Gliding Australia, is the governing body for the sport of gliding in Australia. It was founded in 1949. Gliding Australia is responsible to Civil Aviation Safety Authority for the conduct of safe gliding operations in Australia. This includes the setting and maintenance of flying standards and in particular training standards, for gliding and soaring flight in heavier-than-air fixed-wing gliders and sailplanes, powered sailplanes and touring motor gliders, but excluding flexible wing, weight shift hang gliders and paragliders.

== Activities ==
Gliding Australia provides services to its members such as:

- Regulatory issues covering pilot training, licensing and airworthiness handled under the delegations from the government regulatory body (CASA)
- Liaison with government agencies (such as Civil Aviation Safety Authority, Airservices Australia and Australian Transport Safety Bureau, particularly in terms of operations, safety, airspace access, occurrence investigations and management responsibilities
- Liaison with other sporting and recreational aviation bodies on matters of mutual interest (e.g. through Australian Sport Aviation Confederation)
- Arranging and managing liability insurance coverage for all members and clubs
- Awarding FAI badges and managing Australian gliding records
- Encouraging and staging competitions at regional, national and international levels
- Technical matters and technology development
- Promotion of gliding and soaring
- Liaison with international gliding organisations (such as OSTIV and the FAI)

In Australia, glider pilots are exempt from holding pilot licences but the GFA is responsible for the establishment of glider pilot certificates. These are regarded highly enough by CASA and the aviation industry to be considered as a satisfactory substitute for licences. Australian glider pilots wishing to fly gliders in other countries can convert their GFA Glider Pilot Certificates (GPC) to CASA–issued (and ICAO compliant).

== Organisation ==
The GFA is a tiered structure based on regional associations, which are in turn based on gliding clubs. It is only possible to be a member of the GFA if one is also a member of a gliding club which is affiliated to the GFA through the applicable regional association. The five regional associations are

- Gliding Queensland (GQ), which covers all of Queensland and the northern New South Wales border region south to Byron Bay
- the New South Wales Gliding Association (NSWGA), which covers NSW except as noted above
- the South Australian Gliding Association (SAGA), which covers South Australia and the Northern Territory
- Victorian Soaring Association, which covers Victoria and Tasmania
- the West Australian Gliding Association (WAGA)

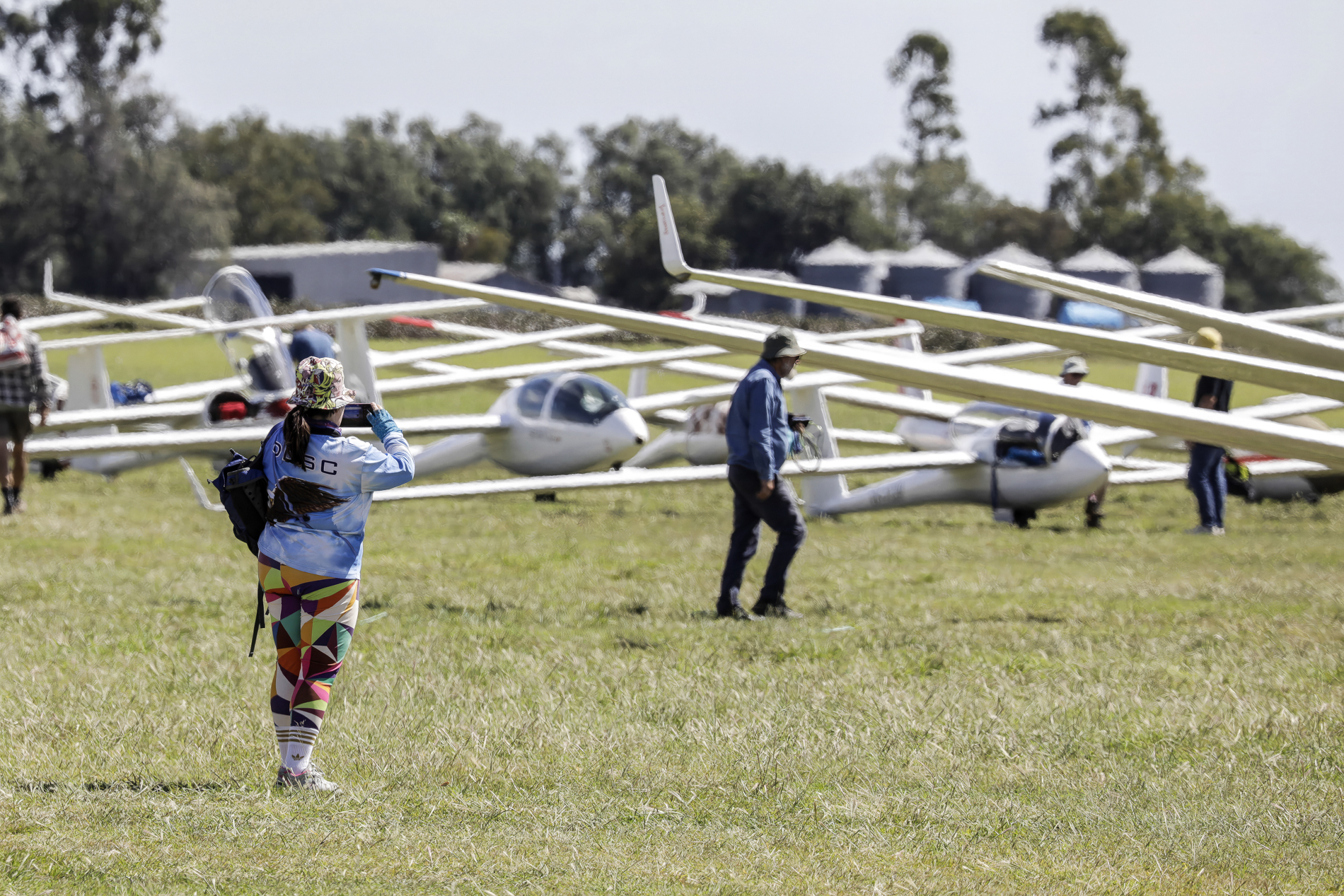
Gliders in Australia

Gliding Australia is applying to the Civil Aviation Safety Authority (CASA) for formal recognition as an Approved Self-administering Aviation Organisation (ASAO) under CASR Part 149 legislation. CASA's assessment of this application is required to be completed by December 2023.

Gliding Australia has modified its constitution to align with Part 149 requirements for key personnel, improve separation of Board and Executive functions, and drive greater organisational efficiencies. The board includes regional, women's and junior representation, with a focus on strategy, priorities, governance, planning and performance. Executive functions include CEO (Accountable Manager), Safety, Operations, Airworthiness, plus Soaring Development, Marketing and Development, as well as enabling administrative functions. As well as meeting legislated ASAO requirements, this organisation provides national support for regions and clubs seeking to participate in the sport, run events and competitions, promote training and coaching and pilot development pathways, promote diversity and inclusion, manage airworthiness standards for varying gliders and systems, learn from incidents and occurrences, and develop training and operational systems.

== Operations ==
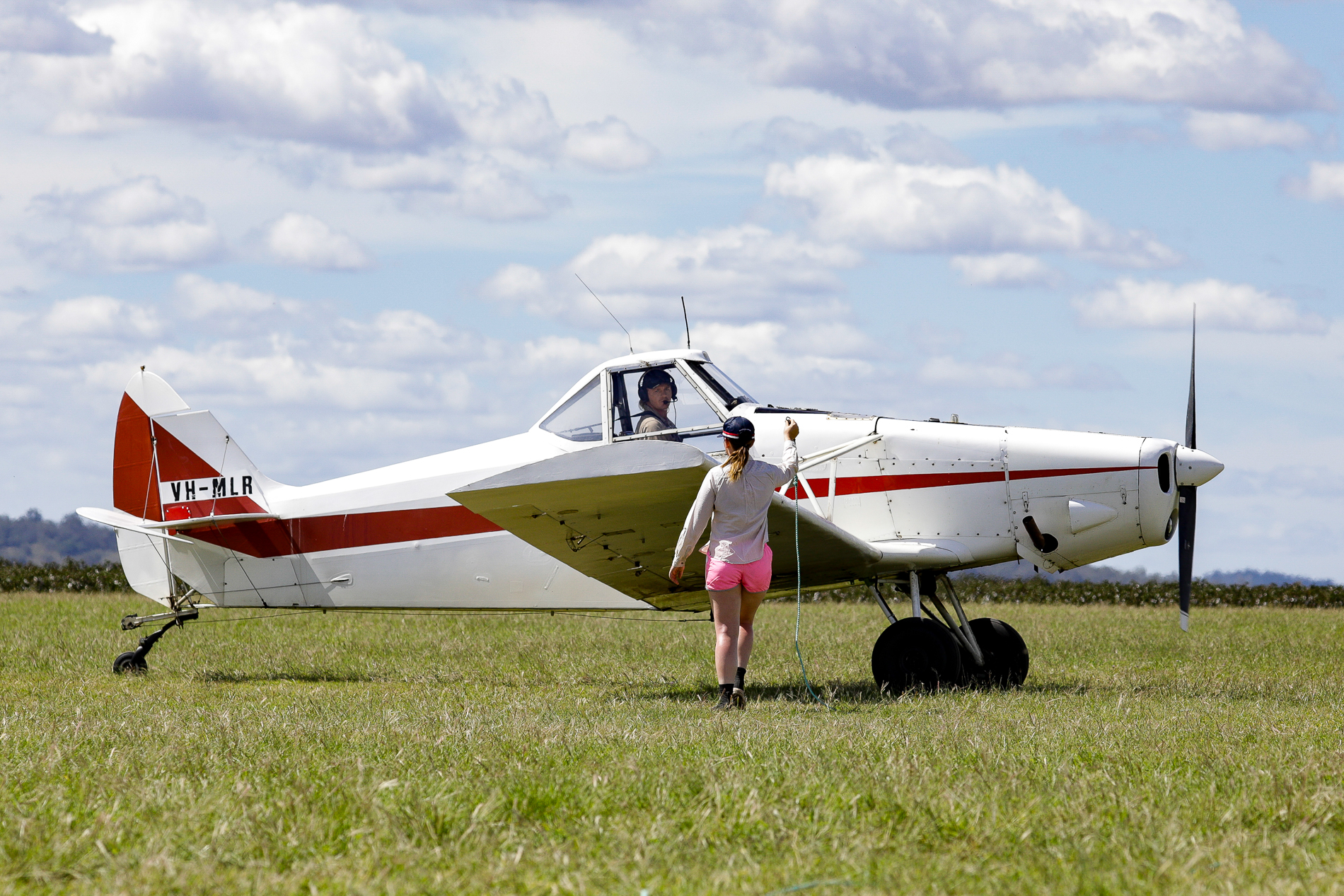
Piper Pawnee

CASA has also delegated training, operational procedures and endorsement of glider towing operations to Gliding Australia, utilising general aviation and light sport aviation powered aircraft fitted with approved tow hooks and releases.

Australia has hosted World Gliding Championship contests on several occasions.
