= John S. Trower =

American businessman (1849–1911)

John Sheppard Trower
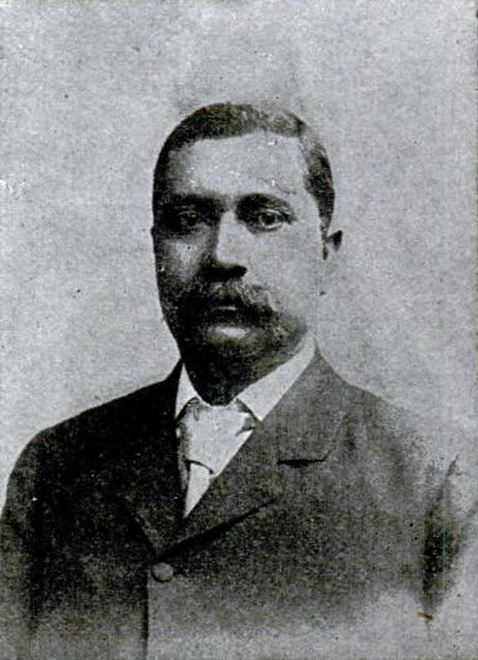
- John S. Trower, c. 1911
- Born: October 3, 1849; Eastville, Virginia, U.S.
- Died: April 11, 1911 (aged 61); Philadelphia, Pennsylvania, U.S.
- Occupation(s): Caterer and businessman

John Sheppard Trower (1849–1911) was an American businessman, restaurateur, and founder of a school. He co-founded Downingtown Industrial and Agricultural School, in operation from 1905 until 1993. Trower was among the wealthiest African Americans in Pennsylvania and possibly the United States at the time of his death.

== Early life and career ==
Trower was born on October 3, 1849, in Eastville, Northampton County, Virginia. His parents, Luke and Anna M. Trower, were free black farmers and of mixed white, Native American and African American descent.

From age 16 to 21, Trower worked on the farm with his family, saving all that he could. All through his early life young Trower was hobbled with the necessity of servicing his family's debt. By the time he was 21 he had saved enough to lift this burden from his family and he felt free to go in search of a fortune. He presented his mother with the deed of the farm and bade her goodbye. At that time, the tide of immigration had already set in from the Virginia plantations toward the cities and young Trower drifted with it in the direction of Baltimore. There was $52 surplus after the farm was paid for and with this sum Trower, wholly inexperienced in the difficulties and dangers of city life, landed in Baltimore.

Trower was fortunate there in meeting the Mack family, with whom he made his home during the larger part of the time that he was in Baltimore. They gave him advice which proved of great value to him in his later life. While he was in Baltimore he obtained work in a restaurant as an oyster-opener and soon began, in spite of the small salary he received there, to accumulate a small capital. Partly because he believed he could better his condition in a Northern city and partly led by mere desire to see more of the world, he determined in 1870 to leave Baltimore and go to Philadelphia.

== Business success ==
Trower decided to settle in Germantown, one of the more wealthy and prosperous quarters of the city, and with the little capital that he had gotten together, he opened a restaurant. He found a modest place in Chelton Avenue in the neighborhood of the Philadelphia and Reading depot. This business seems to have prospered from the beginning. Very soon, Trower was doing, in addition to his restaurant business, a very respectable trade as a caterer. He won the favor of the fashionable people of Germantown and his increasing trade forced him rapidly into a larger and more lucrative business.

Within two blocks of his restaurant stood the old Germantown Savings Fund building. Fortunately for Trower, this building was left vacant at this time, the bank having just completed a new building into which it established itself. There was a demand for a first-class caterer's establishment in Germantown. Trower had succeeded in winning the goodwill of some of the wealthy citizens and, with their encouragement, he purchased and refitted the Savings Fund building and made out of it, at a cost of $25,000, a first-class caterer's establishment. He was now fairly on his feet in a business way and began to make money rapidly. It was at this time that he made the acquaintance and won the goodwill of some of the officers of William Cramp & Sons, a shipbuilding company. Soon after this, in 1889, Trower had his first opportunity to cater for the Cramps. The firm employed him steadily after that time. Many of the world's most renowned war vessels were served upon their trial trips by Trower, among them the Yorktown, the Philadelphia, the Vesuvius, the New York, the Iowa, the Columbia, the Baltimore, the Minneapolis, the Newark, the Brooklyn, the Variag, the Retvizan, the Mecidiye, the Colorado and the Pennsylvania.

Trower's place of business was one of the most complete of its kind in the country. On the first floor were his offices, dining-room, delivery department and ice cream plant, which was run by electricity. On the second floor was a reception-room and a dining hall, which seated 150 guests, and the baking department. On the third floor were the storeroom and laundry. In the basement were china closets and storage-rooms. In his office he employed five clerks, all of whom were young African American men and women. The culinary, ice cream, baking, and delivery service departments employed 20 people. A large element of Trower's success must be attributed to the fact that he constantly sought to improve and extend his business. His trade was not limited to Germantown and Philadelphia, but extended throughout the state. On several occasions he served large orders in the South and West. At the time when John Wanamaker, of Philadelphia, was Postmaster General, Trower served him as caterer in a reception which was at that time one of the most elaborate that had ever been given in Washington, D.C.

In addition to his caterer's trade he did a lucrative real estate business. He owned considerable property both in Germantown and Ocean City, New Jersey, where he had his summer residence.

== Personal life ==
Outside of his business, Trower was a member of the well known Cherry Street Baptist Church. He was a member of the board of deacons, and of the board of trustees, and superintendent of the Sunday school. The National Baptist Convention made him the National Baptist Superintendent of the World. He was the President of the Sunday School Convention of Pennsylvania, a position he held for many years. Trower contributed greatly to the building up of a number of Baptist churches of his city and state. His advice was frequently sought in matters of finance and church policy in the Baptist denomination. He was president of the Cherry Building and Loan Society, treasurer of the Reliable Mutual Aid and Improvement Company, and treasurer of the Reliable Business Men's Building. He was a member of the board of trustees for the Home for Aged and Infirm Colored People, and member of the board of trustees for the Olive Cemetery. As president of the Pennsylvania Sunday School Convention, it was he who suggested the necessity of the establishment of an Industrial and Theological School in Pennsylvania. He purchased a farm in Downingtown, Pennsylvania, and held it in trust until the Baptists of the state were enabled to assume the responsibility of the purchase. Trower was also very active in charitable work.

Trower's wife was Miss Matilda Daniels, of Haymarket, Virginia. Matilda Trower took an active part in the business as well as rearing a family of six children.

== Death ==
Trower died in Philadelphia on April 4, 1911, at the age of 61. His reputed wealth of approximately $1 million placed him among the richest African Americans in Pennsylvania and possibly the United States.
