= Edward L. Jackson (American football) =

American football coach

Biographical details
- Born: c. 1906; Springfield, Massachusetts, U.S.
- Died: January 22, 1984 (aged 77); Washington, D.C., U.S.
- Education: Springfield; Penn State

Coaching career (HC unless noted)

Football
- 1932–1935: Delaware State
- 1937–1944: Johnson C. Smith
- 1945–1952: Howard
- 1953–1955: Delaware State

Basketball
- c. 1940: Johnson C. Smith
- ?–1956: Delaware State

Administrative career (AD unless noted)
- 1945–1953: Howard
- 1956–1968: Tuskegee

Head coaching record
- Overall: 129–53–10 (football)
- Bowls: 1–0

Accomplishments and honors

Championships
- Football; 2 MAAA (1934–1935)

Edward L. Jackson (c. 1906 – January 19, 1984) was an American college football and college basketball coach and administrator for several historically black colleges and universities in the Eastern United States. He served as the head football coach at Delaware State University, Johnson C. Smith University and Howard University, altering his tenures among the three schools over the course of 23 years. Jackson also coached basketball at Johnson C. Smith and Delaware State.

Jackson was born in Springfield, Massachusetts, where he attended Springfield Central High School. He then studied at Bay Path Institute—now known as Bay Path University—and Howard University. In 1928, he transferred to Springfield College in his hometown. Jackson received Bachelor of Science and Master of Education degrees from Springfield. He earned a doctorate from the School of Physical Education at Pennsylvania State University in 1955. Jackson went to the Tuskegee Institute in 1956, serving as physical education director until 1968 and then as vice president of academic affairs. In 1970, he was recognized by the American Association for Health, Physical Education, and Recreation with a Presidential Citation.

Jackson was assistant dean of the graduate school at Howard from 1974 until his retirement in 1981. He died on January 19, 1984, at Washington Hospital Center in Washington, D.C.

== Head coaching record ==
Year	Team	Overall	Conference	Standing	Bowl/playoffs
Delaware State Hornets (Middle Atlantic Athletic Association) (1932–1935)
1932	Delaware State	1–5	1–3	5th	
1933	Delaware State	4–4	3–3		
1934	Delaware State	8–0	7–0	1st	
1935	Delaware State	7–1	5–0	1st	
Johnson C. Smith Golden Bulls (Colored Intercollegiate Athletic Association) (1937–1944)
1937	Johnson C. Smith	5–2–1	3–2	4th	
1938	Johnson C. Smith	5–2–1	2–2–1	7th	
1939	Johnson C. Smith	7–2	4–2	3rd	
1940	Johnson C. Smith	8–1	5–1	3rd	
1941	Johnson C. Smith	7–1–2	4–1–1	2nd	W Flower
1942	Johnson C. Smith	5–1–1	4–1–1	2nd	
1943	Johnson C. Smith	4–4	1–3	5th	
1944	Johnson C. Smith	5–0–3	3–0–2	3rd	
Johnson C. Smith:		46–13–8	25–12–5		
Howard Bison (Colored / Central Intercollegiate Athletic Association) (1945–1952)
1945	Howard	4–4	4–3	T–5th	
1946	Howard	6–3	6–2	4th	
1947	Howard	6–2–1	6–2–1	4th	
1948	Howard	7–2	7–2	2nd	
1949	Howard	6–3	6–3	6th	
1950	Howard	5–4	5–4	8th	
1951	Howard	5–4	5–4	9th	
1952	Howard	6–2–1	5–2–1	6th	
Howard:		45–24–2	44–22–2		
Delaware State Hornets (Central Intercollegiate Athletic Association) (1953–1956)
1953	Delaware State	4–4	2–4	14th	
1954	Delaware State	7–1	5–1	6th	
1955	Delaware State	7–1	5–1	8th	
Delaware State:		38–16	28–12		
Total:		129–53–10			
National championship Conference title Conference division title or championship game berth
