= Model Aeronautical Association of Australia =

Australian organisation for aeromodelling

- Sport: Air sports
- Jurisdiction: Australia
- Abbreviation: MAAA
- Founded: 1947
- Affiliation: Australian Sport Aviation Confederation

Official website
- www.maaa.asn.au
- (Australia)

The Model Aeronautical Association of Australia Inc (MAAA) is an organisation recognised by the Civil Aviation Safety Authority (CASA) as a Recreational Aviation Administration Organisation (RAOO). MAAA has no regulatory authority conferred to it by the CASA, however it is required under a Deed of Agreement with CASA as an RAAO, to carry out certain functions on behalf of CASA paid from the public purse. It is affiliated to the Fédération Aéronautique Internationale (FAI) through the Australian Sport Aviation Confederation. Founded in 1947, as of April 2013 the MAAA has over 10,000 members, down from a high of 12,000 in 2012, and total assets including flying fields, land and equipment worth more than $4 million AUD.

The MAAA is responsible for providing for its members:

- public liability, personal injury, and executive insurance.
- a framework of rules for the safe operation of model aircraft.
- an access pathway to enter national, international, and world championship competitions.
- recognition by CASA (Civil Aviation Safety Authority Australia) as a Recreational Aviation Administration Organisation (RAAO).
- recognition by CASA as the only Recreational Aviation Administrative Organisation for model aviation in Australia.

The MAAA produces a quarterly newsletter called Wingspan available from their website.

The MAAA offers a Wings program, teaching beginners how to safely operate radio controlled model aircraft.

== History ==
Aeromodelling started in Australia in the early 1900s following the invention of the aeroplane however, it was not until the 1930s that organised modelling groups appeared. Two rival groups formed in NSW, the MAA, Model Aeroplane Association of Australia in 1930 and the MFC, Model Flying Club of Australia in 1931. The two groups merged in 1947 to become the Model Aeronautical Association of Australia or MAAA.

The first national competition was held in 1938 and was organised as entertainment to coincide with Australia's 150th Anniversary. The competition was actually called the Grand International Model Aeroplane Championships and included indoor and outdoor Free Flight models only, a total of five events. It was hoped that model flyers from the UK and USA would come to the competition however it ended up being only Australian's and New Zealander's who attended.

World War 2 prevented any further flying competitions from occurring due to ban on model flying during the war, so as such, no competitions were held between 1939 and 1947.

The 2nd Nationals did not occur until 1948 after the MAAA had formed and it included Control line which was only new at the time and the 3rd Nationals in 1950 included radio controlled models. Following the 3rd Nationals there has been a Nationals in Australia every year since organised by the State Associations on a roster basis and usually held over the Christmas/New Year break at the end of the year.

== Membership ==
Individuals are able to join the MAAA through a recognized MAAA club or on their own in exceptional circumstances. Affiliate members are able to have a say in the running of the association through their State body which is the MAAA. Membership of the MAAA is gained through associate membership via State Associations whom the individual aeromodelling or flying clubs are members. People become affiliate members of the MAAA when they join an aeromodelling club or a state association.

== State associations ==
State associations are the MAAA and have individual aeromodellers as members. The aeromodelling clubs are associate members of the relevant State Association. In other words, when someone joins a model flying club they become a member of that club and an associate member of their affiliated State Association as well as an affiliate member of the MAAA automatically. Individuals can also become associate members of other aeromodelling clubs if they want to. This structure allows affiliate members to enact change through their club and State Association.

== Nationals ==
List of MAAA Nationals competitions held since 1938

- 2023 73rd West Wyalong NSW (FF, CL & SAMS)
- 2022 1st West Wyalong Nationals
- 2021 rescheduled due to Covid-19 pandemic
- 2020 cancelled due to Covid-19 World Pandemic
- 2019 71st West Wyalong NSW
- 2018 70th West Wyalong NSW
- 2017 69th Whalan NSW / Albury NSW (No RC or FF)
- 2016 69th FF Nats West Wyalong - No CL Nationals held due to hosting of CL World Championships Perth WA
- 2015 68th Brisbane Qld
- 2014 No Nationals held this calendar year
- 2013 67th Albury / Wodonga Vic
- 2012 66th Albury NSW
- 2011 65th Perth WA
- 2010 64th Dalby Qld
- 2009 63rd Albury / Wodonga Vic
- 2008 62nd Albury NSW
- 2007 61st Perth WA
- 2006 60th Albury / Wodonga Vic
- 2005 59th Fleurieu Peninsula SA
- 2004 58th Richmond NSW
- 2003 57th Busselton WA
- 2002 56th Albury / Wodonga Vic
- 2001 55th Albury / Wodonga Vic
- 2000 54th Busselton WA
- 1999 53rd Nowra NSW
- 1998 52nd Toowoomba Qld
- 1997 51st Wakerie SA
- 1996 50th Darwin NT
- 1995 49th Ballarat Vic
- 1994 48th Mundijong WA
- 1993 47th Wagga Wagga NSW
- 1992 46th Bundaberg Qld
- 1991 45th Wakerie SA
- 1990 44th Bendigo Vic
- 1989 43rd Bunbury WA
- 1988 42nd Amberly Qld
- 1987 41st Richmond NSW
- 1986 40th Wakerie SA
- 1985 39th Wangaratta Vic
- 1984 38th Mandurah WA
- 1983 37th Richmond NSW
- 1982 36th Warwick Qld
- 1981 35th Horsham Vic
- 1980 34th Albany WA
- 1979 33rd Goulburn NSW
- 1978 32nd Amberly Qld
- 1977 31st Camperdown Vic
- 1976 30th Bunbury WA
- 1975 29th Loxton SA
- 1974 28th Camden NSW
- 1973 27th Amberly Qld
- 1972 26th Geelong Vic
- 1971 25th Notham WA
- 1970 24th Strathalbyn SA
- 1969 23rd Wallacia NSW
- 1968 22nd Warrnabool Vic
- 1967 21st Northam WA
- 1966 20th Strathalbyn SA
- 1965 19th Canberra ACT
- 1964 18th Melbourne Vic
- 1963 17th Strathalbyn SA
- 1962 16th Camden NSW
- 1961 15th Echuca Vic
- 1960 14th Rosewood Qld
- 1959 13th Gawler SA
- 1958 12th Camden NSW
- 1957 11th Cambelltown Tas
- 1956 10th Taralgon Vic
- 1955 9th Archerfield Qld
- 1954 8th Mallala SA
- 1953 7th Toowoomba Qld
- 1952 6th Bendigo Vic
- 1951 5th Camden NSW
- 1950 4th West Beach SA (included R/C)
- 1949 3rd Melbourne Vic
- 1948 2nd Bankstown NSW (included Control Line)
- 1939 to 1947 - No nationals held due to WWII
- 1938 1st Sydney NSW, Centennial Park Sydney NSW and Richmond NSW (Free flight only)

== See also ==
- Fédération Aéronautique Internationale
- Academy of Model Aeronautics, the United States association of aeromodelling
- Radio Controlled Model Aircraft
- Control Line Model Aircraft
- Free Flight Model Aircraft
- Model aircraft
- Gordon Burford
- Cox Models
- Cox model engine
