= Middle Atlantic Athletic Association =

The Middle Atlantic Athletic Association (MAAA or M3A) formation date is unknown (circa early 1930s). An article suggests the M3A was formed in 1931–32. This association or what now are known as "conferences" was able to bring together several historically black colleges from middle eastern states to compete for titles in all sports. The Baltimore Afro-American, an African American newspaper features several articles with the teams from the M3A. It includes scores, championship and information pertaining to the schools. The schools that made up this conference were:

- Bowie Normal School (Bulldogs)
- Bordentown School
- Downingtown Industrial and Agricultural School (Downies)
- Princess Anne Academy (Trojans)
- Delaware State College (Hornets)
- Cheyney State Normal School (Wolves)
- Storer College (Golden Tornadoes)

== Football champions ==
- 1932: Cheyney
- 1933: Bordentown
- 1934: Delaware State
- 1935: Delaware State
- 1936: Cheyney
- 1937: Bordentown

== Yearly football standings ==
1932 Middle Atlantic Athletic Association football standings
	Conf.					Overall
Team	W		L		T	W		L		T
Cheyney $	4	–	0	–	2	4	–	1	–	2
Downingtown	4	–	0	–	1	6	–	0	–	1
Storer	3	–	0	–	1	4	–	0	–	1
Bordentown	3	–	3	–	0	4	–	4	–	0
Delaware State	1	–	3	–	0	1	–	5	–	0
Bowie	1	–	4	–	0	1	–	6	–	0
Princess Anne	0	–	6	–	0	0	–	6	–	0
$ – Conference champion; Cheyney was declared by the conference champion based on the Dickinson System.

1934 Middle Atlantic Athletic Association football standings
	Conf.					Overall
Team	W		L		T	W		L		T
Delaware State $	7	–	0	–	0	8	–	0	–	0
Miner Teachers	2	–	1	–	0	5	–	1	–	0
Downingtown	1	–	1	–	2	1	–	1	–	2
Cheyney	2	–	2	–	0	2	–	5	–	0
Bordentown	2	–	3	–	0	3	–	3	–	0
Bowie	2	–	4	–	1	2	–	4	–	1
Storer	0	–	2	–	1	0	–	2	–	1
Princess Anne	0	–	3	–	0	0	–	3	–	0
$ – Conference champion

1936 Middle Atlantic Athletic Association football standings
	Conf.					Overall
Team	W		L		T	W		L		T
Cheyney $	3	–	0	–	1	4	–	1	–	1
Bordentown	3	–	1	–	0	?	–	?	–	?
Storer	2	–	1	–	0	?	–	?	–	?
Downingtown	2	–	2	–	0	?	–	?	–	?
Delaware State	2	–	3	–	0	2	–	5	–	0
Princess Anne	0	–	2	–	0	?	–	?	–	?
Bowie	0	–	3	–	0	?	–	?	–	?
$ – Conference champion

1937 Middle Atlantic Athletic Association football standings
	Conf.					Overall
Team	W		L		T	W		L		T
Bordentown $	4	–	0	–	1	?	–	?	–	?
Cheyney	1	–	0	–	2	1	–	3	–	3
Storer	3	–	1	–	1	?	–	?	–	?
Princess Anne	2	–	2	–	0	?	–	?	–	?
Bowie	1	–	4	–	0	?	–	?	–	?
Downingtown	0	–	4	–	0	?	–	?	–	?
$ – Conference champion; Bordentown was declared by the conference champion based on the Dickinson System.

== See also ==
- List of defunct college football conferences
