= Delaware State Hornets football =

Intercollegiate American football team for Delaware State University

2026 Delaware State Hornets football team
- First season: 1924; 102 years ago
- Athletic director: Brian Ellerbe (Interim)
- Head coach: DeSean Jackson; 2nd season, 12–8 (.600)
- Location: Dover, Delaware
- Stadium: Alumni Stadium (capacity: 7,193)
- NCAA division: Division I FCS
- Conference: MEAC
- Colors: Columbia blue and red
- All-time record: 383–493–11 (.438)
- Bowl record: 1–1 (.500)

Black college national championships
- 2007

Conference championships
- MAAA: 1934, 1935 CIAA: 1956 MEAC: 1985, 1987, 1988, 1989, 1991, 2007
- Rivalries: Delaware (rivalry)
- Marching band: The Approaching Storm Marching Band
- Website: DSUhornets.com

The Delaware State Hornets football team represents Delaware State University (DSU) at the NCAA Division I Football Championship Subdivision level as a member of the Mid-Eastern Athletic Conference (MEAC). They play at the 7,193-seat Alumni Stadium located in Dover, Delaware. The facility opened in 1957 as a multi-purpose venue, for football and track and field.

== History ==
The team began play in 1924 when the program was still known as State College for Colored Students. They were mostly an independent program until the 1930s; they won the Middle Atlantic Athletic Association title in 1934 and 1935. They later joined the Central Intercollegiate Athletics Association, where they played from 1945 to 1970; they won a share on one CIAA title in 1956. They joined the Mid-Eastern Athletic Conference for 1971, where they currently play today.

On November 9, 1980, Delaware State took on quarterback Neil Lomax and the Portland State Vikings and were defeated 105–0 in the largest loss in Division I-AA Football history. This marked a low point for the team and with the help of new coach Joe Purzycki, the Hornets rebuilt their program. He was hired as Delaware State's head coach in 1981, and compiled a 21–21–1 overall record, including a 15–5–1 mark in his last two seasons. Bill Collick, who was Purzycki's defensive coordinator, took over the program in 1985.

The Hornets had their most successful run under Collick's leadership. He led the Hornets to the team's first MEAC championship in his first season. In 1987, Delaware State faced the Howard Bison for the conference championship. The Hornets lost 12–7, crowning Howard champions. Howard's championship was stripped after it was revealed that they played with three ineligible players during the season, retroactively awarding Delaware State the championship. Delaware State won another championship in 1988, sharing the title with Bethune–Cookman and Florida A&M, finishing 5–5 with a 4–2 MEAC record. The next year, DSU went 7–4 with a 5–1 conference record to win the 1989 MEAC championship, their third straight. In 1991, the Hornets finished with a 9–2 record, winning another MEAC title after their loss to Bethune-Cookman was forced to forfeit due to an ineligible player. In the twelve seasons under Collick's leadership, Delaware State went 81–48, winning 5 MEAC championships.

Collick resigned from coaching in 1996 after a 3–8 season, moving to athletic director. Delaware State announced that Fayetteville State offensive coordinator John McKenzie would be Collick's successor. McKenzie's head coaching tenure lasted three seasons, leaving after the 1999 season with a record of 7–26.

Ben Blacknall was hired before the 2000 season. Blacknall earned Coach of the Year honors after a 7–4 season in his first year. This was the most wins the team earned since 1991 and their first winning season since 1995. DSU struggled the next three years, recording a losing record each season.

After starting the 2003 season with an 0–6 start, Delaware State fired Blacknall and hired Al Lavan as their new head football coach, with the task of rebuilding the program once again. When Lavan was hired as head coach of the Hornets in January 2004, he promised to bring championship football back to Delaware State.

During his first season at Delaware State in 2004, Lavan led the Hornets to a 4–7 overall record and a 4–3 mark in the MEAC, DSU's first winning record in conference play since 2000.

Lavan's first DSU victory in the 2004 season was a 28–23 upset of eventual MEAC champ Hampton, the Pirates only loss in a 10–1 regular season. In addition to installing the team's first comprehensive strength and conditioning program, Lavan brought changes in the team's academic, recruiting, practice and discipline policies. The team also secured new audio/visual and computer equipment, thanks to a large donation from prominent alumni.

Lavan also initiated a program of speakers to address the team to share their life experiences, including: former Hornet offensive lineman Matt Horace, subsequently an agent with the Federal Bureau of Alcohol, Tobacco and Firearms; Joe Purzycki, former DSU head football coach and later a banking executive; former pro quarterback and NFL executive James Harris; and former Heisman Trophy winner Herschel Walker.

The 2005 squad posted the Hornets' first winning season since 2000. The team was 7–4 overall, and third in the MEAC with a 6–2 record. Delaware State was picked to finish sixth in the 2005 pre-season MEAC poll. The 2005 season also marked the first time since 1985 that the Hornets posted an undefeated record at home (5–0).

In 2006, the Hornets were 8–3 overall and 6–2 in the MEAC, the first time that DSU posted back-to-back winning seasons since 1994–95, while the eight wins were the most by the team since 1991. Delaware State also appeared in the SportsNetwork Division I-AA Top 25 poll for the first time since 1992, coming in at No. 23 in week ten.

In the 2007 season the Hornets made a school record of 10 wins, their MEAC championship since 1991 and first ever appearance in the NCAA playoffs. In addition, the 2007 Hornets were ranked as high as No. 10 in the weekly SportsNetwork Football Championship Subdivision poll and were No. 15 in the final poll. Delaware State was recognized as 2007 American Sports Wire Division I Black College National Champions and No. 2 in the final Sheridan Broadcast Network poll of historically black colleges and universities teams. It is currently the only 10-win ssason in program history.

Lavan was honored as the 2007 Pigskin Club of Washington, D.C., MEAC Coach-of-the-Year and Football Championship Subdivision Region II Coach-of-the-Year. He was second in the voting for the 2007 Eddie Robinson Award, recognizing the top Football Championship Subdivision coach, and was awarded the 2008 Making A Difference Award by the DSU Alumni Association. He was also selected as head coach for the 2008 American Heritage Bowl/Navy-Marine Corps All-Star Classic in San Clemente, Calif. He led the Northeast All-Stars to a 24–7 victory in the contest.

In four seasons at DSU, Lavan posted an overall record of 29–16, including a 24–7 mark in MEAC contests. He has led the team to winning records in each of the last three seasons. In the three years prior to his arrival, the Hornets were 10–24 overall and 6–17 in the league. Delaware State had just one winning season in the eight years before Lavan took the job. After three straight losing seasons, Lavan was fired from Delaware State on December 2, 2010.

Kermit Blount was hired as head coach, beginning his tenure with the 2011 season. The Hornets had average outputs in 2012 (6–5, 5–3 in the MEAC) and 2013 (5–6, 5–3 in the MEAC), leading to fourth-place finishes both seasons. In 2014, Delaware State recorded a 2–10 record, its worst in since 2003. The season ended with five straight losses, including a 69–7 loss to Morgan State in the final game. Delaware State decided not to renew Blount's contract after the 2014 season.

Kenny Carter was named head coach in 2015. He was fired in 2017, with a 3–30 record. Delaware State slumped to a seventeen-game losing streak over the course of Carter's tenure.

Rod Milstead, a former NFL player and DSU alum, was named head coach in January 2018. Delaware State had a 3–8 season in 2018, a 2–10 season in 2019, and a 2–3 abbreviated season in 2020 (played in spring 2021).

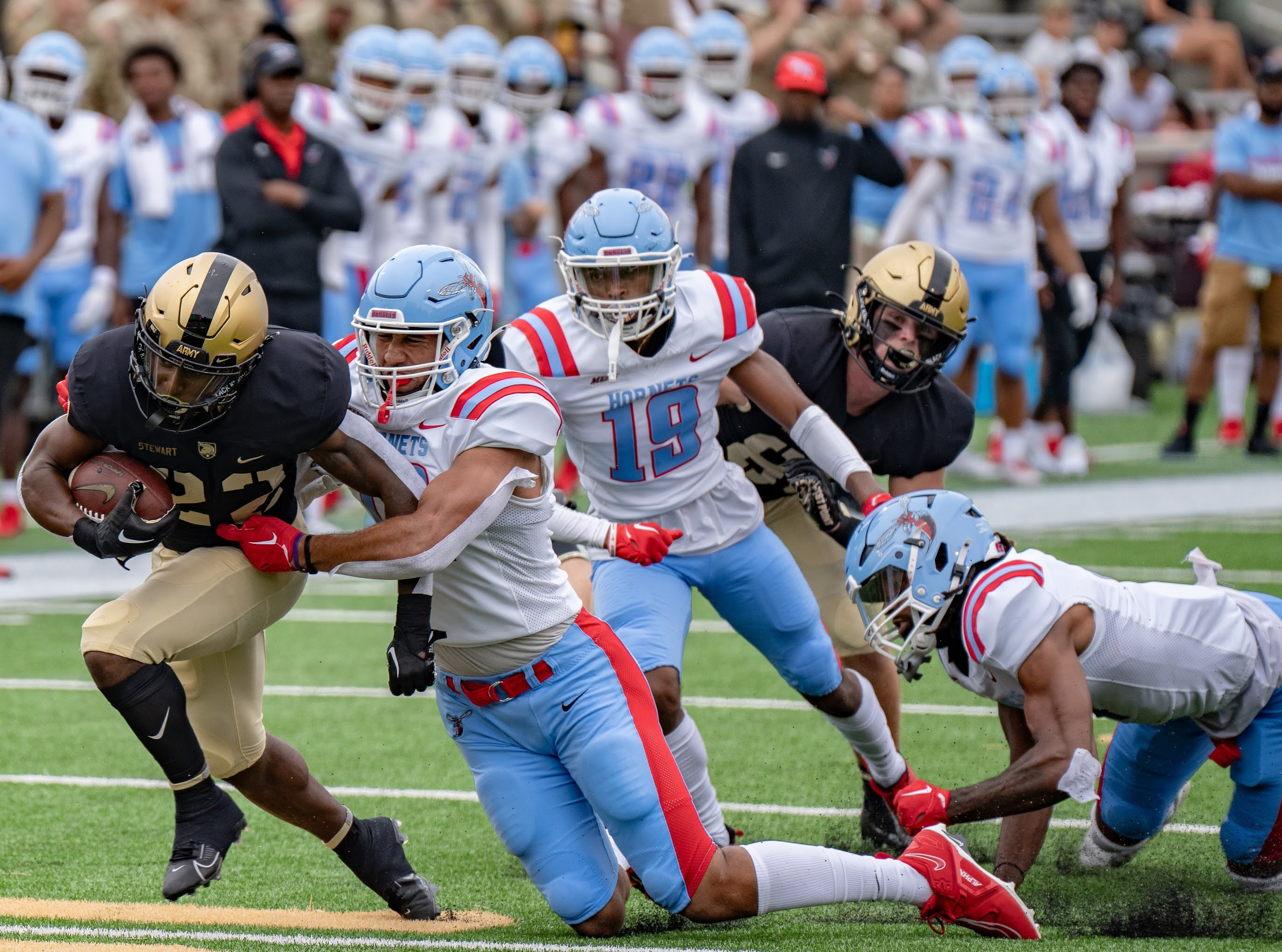
A game between Army and Delaware State in 2023

=== Hornets vs. Blue Hens controversy ===
The most controversial aspect of the DSU football program was that it had never been scheduled by potential instate rival University of Delaware for a regular season game. It was highly unusual for two state universities that play on the same athletic tier to not play one another, especially schools that are less than one hour's drive away from campus. Critics charged that this had to do with the fact that Delaware State is a historically black college. Furthermore, supporters of a game between DSU and UD claimed that it would be akin to other in-state college rivalries and would be good for the state. In response to the charges of racism on UD's part, their supporters pointed out that Delaware had scheduled and played regular season games against several other HBCUs such as Morgan State and North Carolina A&T. UD supporters also claimed that DSU's team was not as strong as the Blue Hens, and that UD's program had made commitments to other universities that they had to fulfill. Finally, UD supporters also noted the fact that the two colleges routinely meet in sports other than football.

This controversy was laid to rest when UD and DSU met on the football field for the first time on November 23, 2007, in Newark, Delaware in the first round of the NCAA FCS Playoffs. The Blue Hens defeated the Hornets 44–7 in front of an attendance of 19,765, the largest playoff crowd in Delaware Stadium history. In 2009, the teams began playing each other during the regular season, and in 2011 the teams began an annual series (skipping 2015 and 2018), which ended in 2022, with all but one of these games played at Delaware Stadium. The 2021 matchup, which was postponed from fall 2020 to April due to health and safety reason in relation to the COVID-19 pandemic, was played for the first time at Alumni Stadium. Delaware has won all twelve meetings to date as of 2025.

== Conference affiliations ==
=== Classifications ===
- 1956–1972: NCAA College Division
- 1973–1977: NCAA Division II
- 1978–present: NCAA Division I–AA/FCS

=== Conference memberships ===
- 1924–1933: Independent
- 1934–1936: Middle Atlantic Athletic Association
- 1937–1944: Independent
- 1945–1970: Central Intercollegiate Athletics Association
- 1971–Present: Mid-Eastern Athletic Conference

== Championships ==
=== National championships ===
Year	Coach	Record	Championship
2007	Al Lavan	10–2	Black college national

=== Conference championships ===
Delaware State has won 9 conference championships as of the 2020 season.

Year	Coach	Conference	Overall record	Conference record
1934	Edward L. Jackson	Middle Atlantic Athletic Association	8–0	6–0
1935	Edward L. Jackson	Middle Atlantic Athletic Association	7–1	5–0
1956†	Bennie J. George	Central Intercollegiate Athletic Association	7–1–1	5–0–1
1985	Bill Collick	Mid-Eastern Athletic Conference	9–2	4–0
1987	Bill Collick	Mid-Eastern Athletic Conference	9–1	5–0
1988†	Bill Collick	Mid-Eastern Athletic Conference	5–5	4–2
1989	Bill Collick	Mid-Eastern Athletic Conference	7–4	5–1
1991†	Bill Collick	Mid-Eastern Athletic Conference	9–2	5–1
2007	Al Lavan	Mid-Eastern Athletic Conference	10–2	8–0

† co-champions

== Bowl games ==
Delaware State has participated in two bowl games.

Year	Date	Head coach	Bowl	Opponent	Score
1946	January 1, 1947	Tom Conrad	Flower Bowl	Florida N&I	W 7–6
1977	December 3, 1977	Ed Wyche	Orange Blossom Classic	Florida A&M	L 15–37

== Hornets in the pros ==
- DE Steve Coleman – Denver Broncos
- FB Steve Davis – Pittsburgh Steelers/New York Jets
- DT Rodney Gunter – Arizona Cardinals
- DE/DT Uhuru Hamiter – New Orleans Saints
- CB Victor Heflin – St. Louis Cardinals
- C Jamaal Jackson – Philadelphia Eagles
- C Chris Jones – New York Giants
- TE David Jones – San Diego Chargers/Los Angeles Raiders
- CB Tim King – Tampa Bay Buccaneers
- FL Al Lawson – New York Jets (AFL)
- WR Shaheer McBride – Philadelphia Eagles
- WR Darnerien McCants – Washington Redskins/Philadelphia Eagles
- OG Rod Milstead – San Francisco 49ers/Washington Redskins
- LB Frank Nicholson – New York Giants
- DE Lybrant Robinson – Washington Redskins
- WR John Taylor – San Francisco 49ers
- WR Walter Tullis – Green Bay Packers
- WR Clarence Weathers – Cleveland Browns/New England Patriots/Green Bay Packers/Kansas City Chiefs
- OG Gordon Wright – Philadelphia Eagles (NFL)/New York Jets (AFL)

== Future non-conference opponents ==
Announced schedules as of June 26, 2026

2026	2027	2028	2029
Stony Brook	at Liberty	at Stony Brook	William & Mary
at William & Mary			
Bowie State			
at South Florida			
Towson			
at Albany			
Franklin Pierce			
