= Downingtown Industrial and Agricultural School =

School in Chester County, Pennsylvania

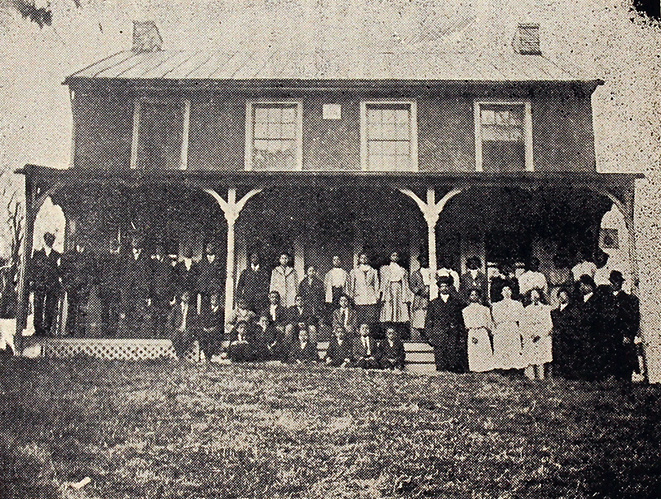
- Main building, c. 1907. By 1910, this served as the girls' dormitory.

Location
- Chester County, Pennsylvania, U.S.
- Coordinates: 40.026°N 75.745°W

Information
- Type: Private Black
- Motto: "self help through self work"
- Established: 1905
- Founders: John Sheppard Trower, William Abraham Creditt
- Closed: 1993

The Downingtown Industrial and Agricultural School (DIAS) was a private school for African American students active from 1905 until 1993, and located in Downingtown, Chester County, Pennsylvania, U.S. Its motto was "self help through self work". It was located in what is now East Brandywine Township.

== History ==
The school was founded by John S. Trower and William Abraham Creditt. Both were well-known, successful African Americans from Philadelphia. Tower was a local businessman, and Creditt was pastor of the city's first African Baptist church.

The school's purpose was to provide vocational training; and was aimed at educating African-American youth that struggled with schooling. By 1907, an illustrated report on the school was published showings the school's chapel, barn, dining room, and sewing room. The school was included in Philadelphia's colored directory in 1910. In July 1912 the school announced that it would be sending fifteen graduates to Lincoln University that fall.

Creditt served as the school's president for many years. James N. H. Waring Jr. (1890–1973), the son of a prominent physician, served as the school's principal in the 1930s. Mortelia Womack, who worked as a secretary for W. E. B. Du Bois, applied for a job in the school in 1931 and Du Bois sent the school's principal, J. H. N. Waring, Jr., a reference for her.

Howard D. Queen, a US Army colonel and commander of the 366th Infantry Regiment during World War II, served in the mathematics department after his military career.

In 1980, a thirty-six-page publication authored by Clay Griffin about the school was published.

Founders of Downingtown Industrial and Agricultural School

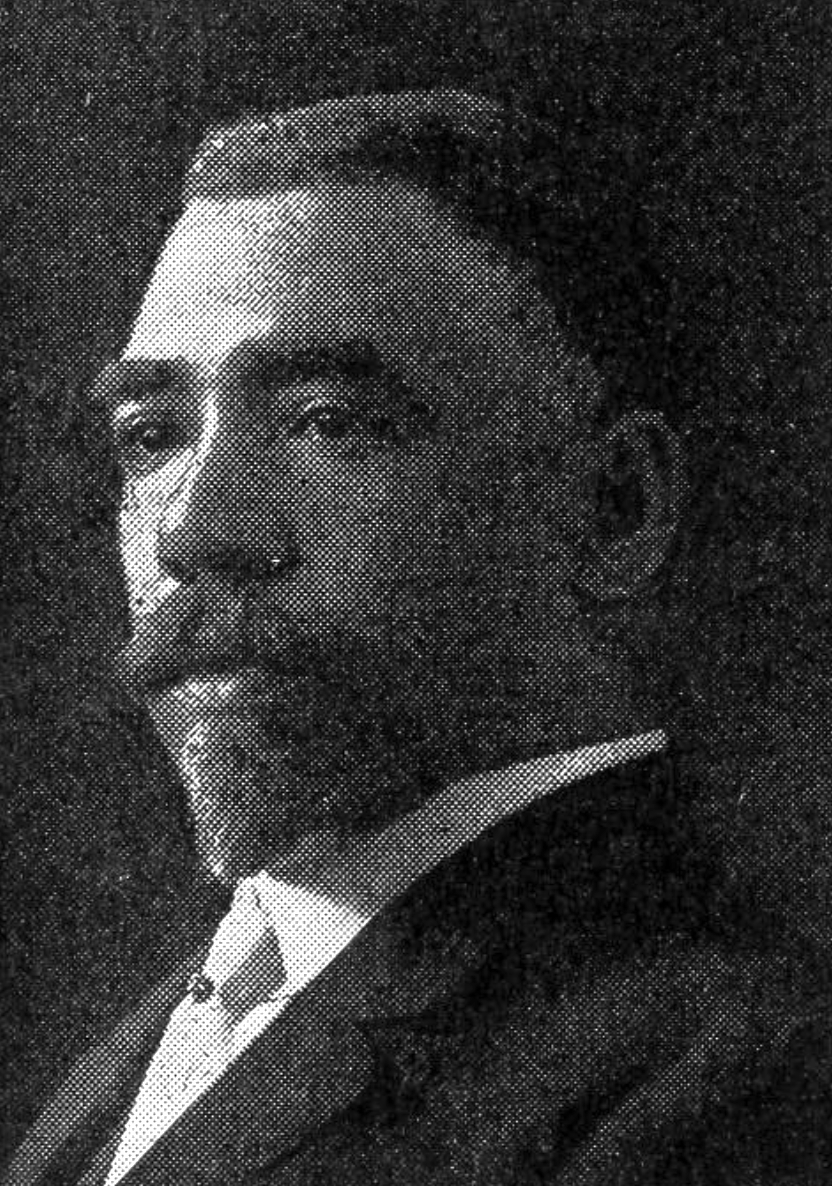
William Abraham Creditt (c. 1913)

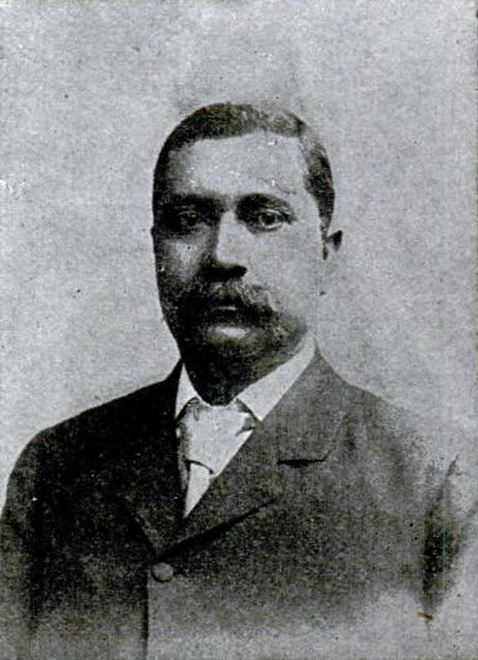
John Sheppard Trower (c. 1911)

== Legacy ==
Delaware County Community College's Downingtown campus is on the site of the former school.

Notable alumni include Cab Calloway, famous for, among other things, "Minnie the Moocher, or The Hi-De-Ho song."

== See also ==
- Manual labor college
- James N. H. Waring Sr.
