= 2002 Sun Belt Conference football season =

- League: NCAA Division I FBS (Football Bowl Subdivision)
- Sport: football
- Duration: August 25, 2002 - November 30, 2002
- Teams: 7

2003 NFL Draft
- Top draft pick: Charles Tillman (Louisiana–Lafayette)
- Picked by: Chicago Bears, 35th overall

Regular season
- Season champions: North Texas
- Runners-up: New Mexico State
- Season MVP: Brandon Kennedy
- Top scorer: Danny Smith (84 points)

Football seasons
- 2001 2003

2002 Sun Belt Conference football standings
	Conf.			Overall
Team	W		L	W		L
North Texas $	6	–	0	8	–	5
New Mexico State	5	–	1	7	–	5
Arkansas State	3	–	3	6	–	7
Middle Tennessee	2	–	4	4	–	8
Louisiana–Lafayette	2	–	4	3	–	9
Louisiana–Monroe	2	–	4	3	–	9
Idaho	1	–	5	2	–	10
$ – Conference champion

The 2002 Sun Belt Conference football season was the 2nd college football season for the Sun Belt Conference. During the 2002 season, seven schools competed in Sun Belt football: Arkansas State, Idaho, Louisiana–Lafayette, Louisiana–Monroe, Middle Tennessee, New Mexico State and North Texas.

The conference title was won by North Texas, in its second year as both a Sun Belt member, making them the first team to go back-to-back in Sun Belt Conference history.

== Coaches ==
Note: Stats shown are before the beginning of the season

Team	Head coach	Years at school	Overall record	Record at school	Sun Belt record
Arkansas State	Steve Roberts	0	47–35–1	0–0	0–0
Idaho	Tom Cable	1	6–16	6–16	1–5
Louisiana–Lafayette	Rickey Bustle	0	0–0	0–0	0–0
Louisiana–Monroe	Bobby Keasler	3	86–59–2	8–25	2–4
Middle Tennessee	Andy McCollum	3	17–16	17–16	5–1
New Mexico State	Tony Samuel	5	19–37	19–37	4–2
North Texas	Darrell Dickey	4	13–32	13–32	5–1

== Bowl games ==
In 2002, the SBC placed one team in bowl games through their tie-ins: North Texas. New Mexico State was also bowl-eligible but did not receive a bowl invitation.

Note: All times are local

Bowl	Date	SBC team (Record)	Opponent (Record)	Site	TV	Result	Attendance
New Orleans Bowl	December 17	North Texas (7-5)	Cincinnati (7-6)	Louisiana Superdome • New Orleans, LA	ESPN2	W 24–19	19,024

== Awards and honors ==
=== Players of the Year ===
2002 Sun Belt Player of the Year awards

Award	Player	School
Player of the Year	Brandon Kennedy	North Texas
Offensive Player of the Year	Danny Smith	Arkansas State
Defensive Player of the Year	Brandon Kennedy	North Texas
Freshman of the Year	Paul Dombrowski	New Mexico State
Newcomer of the Year	Jonathan Burke	Arkansas State
Coach of the Year	Darrell Dickey	North Texas

=== All-Conference teams ===
Position	Player	Team
First-team Offense
QB	Brian Lindgren	Idaho
RB	Danny Smith*	Arkansas State
RB	Kevin Galbreath*	North Texas
WR	Fred Stamps	UL Lafayette
WR	Mack Vincent	UL Monroe
TE	Jeff Muenchow*	North Texas
OL	Shalimar Jackson*	New Mexico State
OL	Garry Johnson	Arkansas State
OL	Brandon Westbrook	Middle Tennessee
OL	J. R. Randle	North Texas
OL	Nick Zuñiga	North Texas
First-team Defense
DL	Brandon Kennedy*	North Texas
DL	Jon Bradley	Arkansas State
DL	Corey Williams	Arkansas State
DL	Darrell Daniels	North Texas
LB	Jordan Kramer	Idaho
LB	Taylor Casey	North Texas
LB	Cody Spencer	North Texas
DB	Charles Tillman*	UL Lafayette
DB	Siddeeq Shabazz*	New Mexico State
DB	Craig Jones	North Texas
DB	Don McGee	North Texas
First-team Special Teams
K	Dario Aguiniga*	New Mexico State
P	Robert Billings	Middle Tennessee
RS	James Hickenbotham	Arkansas State
All-purpose	ReShard Lee	Middle Tennessee

* = Denotes unanimous selection

Position	Player	Team
Second-team Offense
QB	Paul Dombrowski	New Mexico State
RB	Dwone Hicks	Middle Tennessee
RB	Bryant Jacobs	UL Monroe
WR	Josh Jelmberg	Idaho
WR	Tyrone Calico	Middle Tennessee
TE	Josh Joerg	UL Lafayette
OL	John Crossley	Arkansas State
OL	Jonathon Raush	UL Lafayette
OL	Glen Elarbee	Middle Tennessee
OL	B. J. Van Briesen	New Mexico State
OL	Matt Turney	North Texas
Second-team Defense
DL	Walter Sampson	UL Lafayette
DL	John Thompson	UL Monroe
DL	Adrian Awasom	North Texas
DL	Chris McIver	North Texas
LB	Les Echols	Arkansas State
LB	Carlos Hughes	UL Monroe
LB	Rich Glover	New Mexico State
DB	Chuck Allen	Arkansas State
DB	Jonathan Burke	Arkansas State
DB	Chris Harris	UL Monroe
DB	Jonas Buckles	North Texas
Second-team Special Teams
K	Brian Kelly	Middle Tennessee
P	Brad Kadlubar	North Texas
RS	Cedric Thompson	Idaho
All-purpose	JaMal Branch	North Texas
