= Eli Manning =

American football player (born 1981)

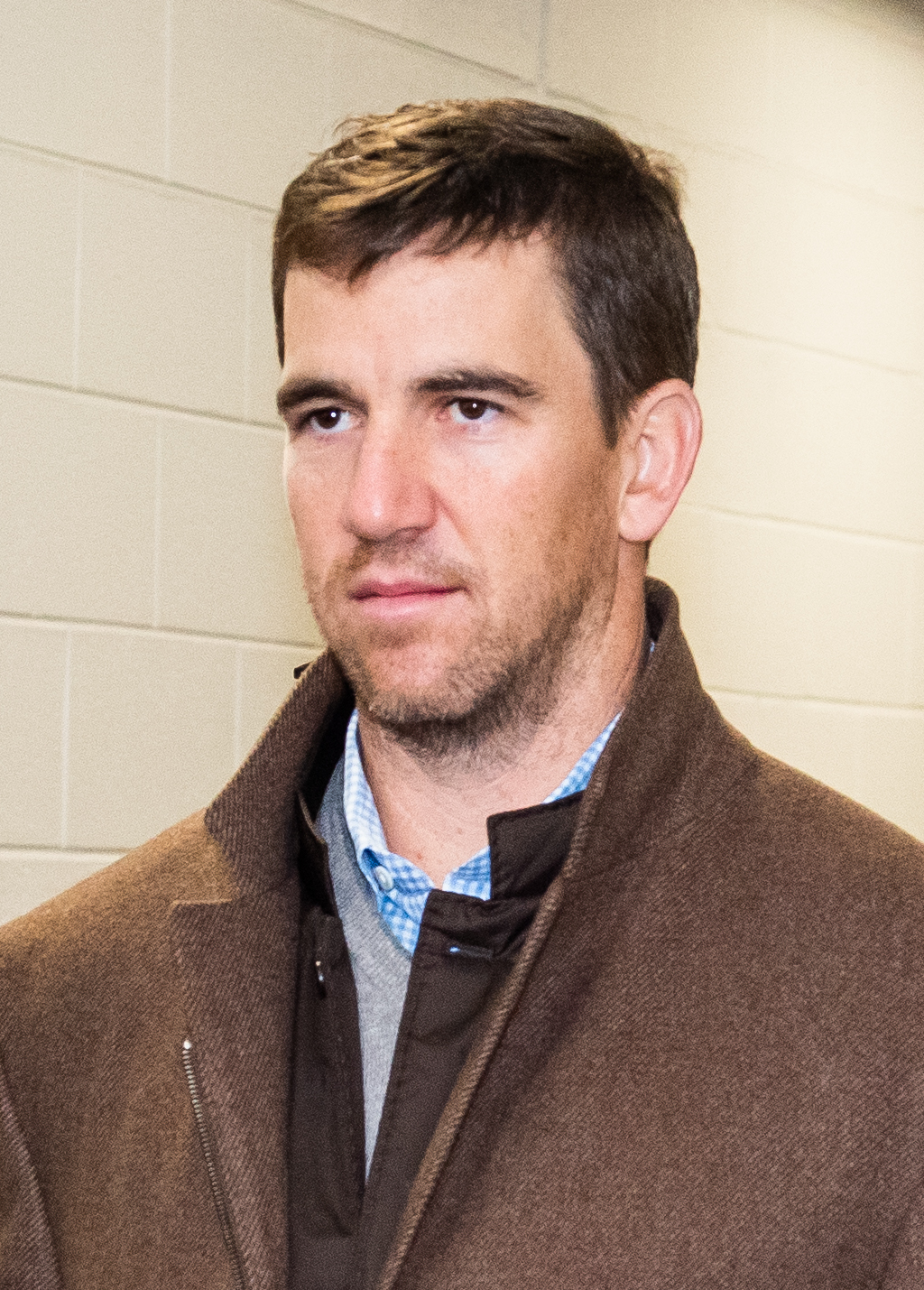
- Manning in 2019

No. 10
- Position: Quarterback

Personal information
- Born: January 3, 1981 (age 45); New Orleans, Louisiana, U.S.
- Listed height: 6 ft 5 in (1.96 m)
- Listed weight: 218 lb (99 kg)

Career information
- High school: Isidore Newman (New Orleans)
- College: Ole Miss (1999–2003)
- NFL draft: 2004: 1st round, 1st overall pick

Career history
- New York Giants (2004–2019)

Awards and highlights
- 2× Super Bowl champion (XLII, XLVI); 2× Super Bowl MVP (XLII, XLVI); Walter Payton NFL Man of the Year (2016); 4× Pro Bowl (2008, 2011, 2012, 2015); SN Athlete of the Year (2008); New York Giants Ring of Honor; New York Giants No. 10 retired; 8th greatest New York Giant of all-time; Maxwell Award (2003); Johnny Unitas Golden Arm Award (2003); Second-team All-American (2003); SEC Offensive Player of the Year (2003); First-team All-SEC (2003); Second-team All-SEC (2002); Ole Miss Rebels No. 10 retired; NFL records: Longest touchdown pass: 99 yards (tied); Most passing yards in a single postseason: 1,219 (2011); Most pass completions and attempts in a single postseason: 106 completions and 163 attempts (2011)

Career NFL statistics
- Passing attempts: 8,119
- Passing completions: 4,895
- Completion percentage: 60.3%
- TD–INT: 366–244
- Passing yards: 57,023
- Passer rating: 84.1
- Stats at Pro Football Reference

Elisha Nelson Manning (born January 3, 1981) is an American former professional football quarterback who played in the National Football League (NFL) for 16 seasons with the New York Giants. A member of the Manning family, he is the youngest son of Archie, younger brother of Cooper and Peyton, and uncle of Arch. Manning played college football for the Ole Miss Rebels, winning the Maxwell and Johnny Unitas Golden Arm awards in 2003. He was selected first overall in the 2004 NFL draft by the San Diego Chargers and traded to the Giants during the draft.

Manning's greatest professional success was twice leading the Giants to underdog Super Bowl victories against the New England Patriots dynasty in Super Bowls XLII and XLVI. The former, which saw the wild card Giants defeat a Patriots team that was the first to win all 16 regular season games, is regarded as one of the greatest sports upsets of all time. Manning was named Super Bowl MVP in both championships, making him one of six players to receive the award multiple times.

As the Giants starting quarterback from 2004 to 2019, Manning holds the franchise records for passing yards, passing touchdowns, and completions. Never missing a game due to injury, he started 210 consecutive games from 2004 to 2017, the third-longest consecutive starts streak by an NFL quarterback. Manning ranks 11th all-time in both passing yards and passing touchdowns. He is the only eligible quarterback with multiple Super Bowl MVP awards to not be inducted to the Pro Football Hall of Fame.

== Early life ==
Elisha Nelson Manning was born on January 3, 1981, in New Orleans. He is the youngest of three boys to Olivia (née Williams) and NFL quarterback Elisha Archibald "Archie" Manning III, both natives of Mississippi. His older brothers, Cooper and Peyton, both played football growing up.

Manning attended high school at the Isidore Newman School in New Orleans, where he played football and basketball for the Greenies. In his high school career, Manning was a three-time All-State selection from 1996 to 1998, was named the USA Today Player of the Year in Louisiana, and passed for a school-record 7,389 yards and 89 touchdowns. His passing mark was later broken by his nephew Arch in 2022. Eli committed to play college football at the University of Mississippi.

== College career ==
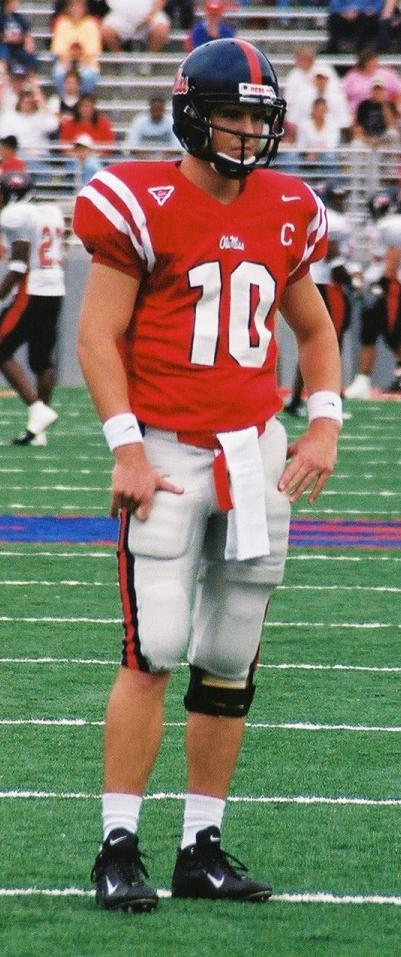
Manning during his tenure at the University of Mississippi

Manning entered college in the shadow of his brother Peyton, quarterback of the Indianapolis Colts, and his father, who was considered a legend and folk hero at Ole Miss. During his years with the Rebels, Manning set or tied numerous single-game, season and career records. His career numbers include 10,119 passing yards (fifth on the SEC career list), 81 touchdown passes (third on the SEC career list), and a passer rating of 137.7 (tied for sixth on the SEC career list).

=== 2000 season ===
As a redshirt freshman, Manning competed with veteran Romaro Miller for the starting quarterback position and saw little playing time. He appeared in six games and passed for 170 total yards and one interception in the Rebels 7–5 season.

=== 2001 season ===
With the departure of Miller, Manning became the Rebels' starting quarterback as a sophomore. In the first game, against Murray State, he converted 20-of-23 pass attempts for 271 yards and five passing touchdowns in the 49–14 victory. In the following game, a 27–21 loss to Auburn, he had 265 passing yards, one passing touchdown and one interception. Over the next few games, Manning helped lead the Rebels to victories over Kentucky, Alabama and LSU. On November 3, in a 58–56 7OT loss to Arkansas, Manning passed for 312 passing yards and six passing touchdowns. The game marked the longest game in major college football history at the time. Overall, Manning had a solid first year as the Rebels' starting quarterback with 2,948 passing yards, 31 touchdowns, and nine interceptions, as the Rebels finished with a 7–4 record.

=== 2002 season ===
Manning's junior season started out promising with a 31–3 victory over Louisiana-Monroe and a 38–16 victory over Memphis. Manning had four passing touchdowns and one interception combined in those two games. In the next game, a 42–28 loss to Texas Tech, Manning passed for 374 yards, three touchdowns and one interception. The Rebels won their next three games, which were over Vanderbilt, #6 Florida and Arkansas State to earn Ole Miss a #21 ranking in the AP Poll. Manning had five touchdowns and one interception in that stretch. The Rebels' fortunes turned in the latter half of the season with a five-game losing streak. In the stretch was a 48–28 loss to Arkansas, in which Manning completed 42-of-56 passes for 414 yards, two touchdowns, and two interceptions. In addition, he had a rushing touchdown. Manning's 414 passing yards marked the most he threw for in college. After a 24–12 win over rival Mississippi State, the Rebels qualified for the Independence Bowl with a 6–6 record to face off against Nebraska. Manning passed for 313 yards and one touchdown in the 27–23 victory. Overall, Manning finished with 3,401 passing yards, 21 touchdowns, and 15 interceptions in his junior season.

=== 2003 season ===
Manning started off his senior season with a 2–2 record. He played well in that stretch with 1,329 passing yards, 11 touchdowns and four interceptions, with victories over Vanderbilt and Louisiana-Monroe, but had losses to Memphis and Texas Tech. The Rebels went on a six-game winning streak that included victories over major SEC opponents #24 Florida, Alabama, #21 Arkansas, South Carolina, and Auburn. Manning passed for 1,552 yards, 12 touchdowns, and four interceptions in the winning streak. Overall, he led the Rebels to a 10–3 record, earning a share of the SEC Western Division championship, and a 31–28 SBC Cotton Bowl Classic victory over #21 Oklahoma State, with 259 passing yards and two touchdowns in 2003. Manning helped lead Ole Miss to their first ten-win season since 1971.

As his senior year came to a close, Manning won many awards, including the Maxwell Award as the nation's best all-around player, the Johnny Unitas Golden Arm Award, the National Football Foundation and College Football Hall of Fame Scholar-Athlete Award, the Sporting News Radio Socrates Award, and the SEC Most Valuable Player Award. He was also a candidate for the 2003 Heisman Trophy, finishing third in the voting after winning quarterback Jason White (University of Oklahoma) and wide receiver Larry Fitzgerald (University of Pittsburgh). Manning was a member of the Sigma Nu fraternity (as was his father), was named Sigma Nu Athlete of the Year in 2001 and 2003, and was inducted into their Hall of Fame in 2008.

Manning graduated from the University of Mississippi with a degree in marketing and a GPA of 3.44 and was on the Dean's Honor Roll.

== Professional career ==
Pre-draft measurables
Height	Weight	Arm length	Hand span	40-yard dash	Wonderlic
6 ft 4 3/4 in (1.95 m)	221 lb (100 kg)	30 1/4 in (0.77 m)	9 1/8 in (0.23 m)	4.90 s	39
All values from NFL Combine

The San Diego Chargers had the first overall pick in the 2004 NFL draft due to their 4–12 record in 2003. Manning was the most coveted player in the draft, and it appeared that the Chargers intended to draft him first overall. Meanwhile, Manning and his father Archie Manning said he would refuse to play for the Chargers. Before the draft, Archie had asked former Chargers quarterback Ryan Leaf‘s father about Leaf's experience with the team and was told that the Chargers did not help Leaf with his personal problems.

The Chargers selected Manning with the first pick overall. The team had a deal with the New York Giants whereby the Giants would draft and then trade Philip Rivers and a 2004 third-round pick, used to select placekicker Nate Kaeding; a 2005 first-round pick, used to select linebacker Shawne Merriman; and a 2005 fifth-round pick (which was later traded away) for Manning. He signed a six-year, $45 million contract with the Giants.

Manning was one of 17 quarterbacks taken in the 2004 NFL draft, along with Rivers and the Pittsburgh Steelers' Ben Roethlisberger. All three had long, successful careers with the teams that signed them and have been compared favorably to the 1983 NFL draft, which included Hall of Fame quarterbacks John Elway, Jim Kelly, and Dan Marino. Manning posted the lowest passing yards, touchdowns, pass completions, completion percentage, TD–INT ratio, passer rating, wins, winning percentage, and Pro Bowl honors of the three, but cemented his legacy with his two upset Super Bowl victories against the New England Patriots' dynasty. Manning and Roethlisberger were both part of two Super Bowl-winning teams, but Manning is the only quarterback of the three to earn Super Bowl MVP honors, which he received in both victories.

=== 2004 season ===
Manning made his NFL regular season debut in Week 1 against the Philadelphia Eagles. He came into the game toward the end the fourth quarter in relief of Kurt Warner. He finished the 31–17 loss 3-of-9 for 66 yards. Manning made his first career regular season start against the Atlanta Falcons at Giants Stadium on November 21, 2004. In the game, Manning threw his first career touchdown on a six-yard pass to Jeremy Shockey in the third quarter. In his fourth start, against the Baltimore Ravens at M&T Bank Stadium on December 12, 2004, he ended the day with a 0.0 passer rating and was benched in the second half in favor of Warner, but remained the Giants starter through the end of the season. In Week 15, against the Pittsburgh Steelers, he recorded his first multi-touchdown performance with 182 passing yards, two touchdowns, and one interception in the 33–30 loss in a duel with fellow rookie quarterback Ben Roethlisberger. In the regular season finale, Manning passed for 144 yards, three touchdowns, and one interception in the 28–24 victory over the Dallas Cowboys, getting his first win as a starter. The Giants finished with a 6–10 record and were 1–6 in games that Manning started in. He finished with 1,043 passing yards, six touchdowns, and nine interceptions.

=== 2005 season: NFC East champions ===
Following 2004, Warner left the Giants, and Manning was named the starter for 2005. Manning led the Giants to a 2–0 record with victories against the Arizona Cardinals and New Orleans Saints, before traveling to the West Coast for a test in a road game against the San Diego Chargers. Chargers fans did not forget the snub, and on September 25, 2005, when Manning and the Giants made their first trip to San Diego for a game since that draft day, the crowd booed Manning loudly every time he touched the ball. San Diego defeated the Giants 45–23, but Manning displayed what may have been his most impressive performance of his young career, going 24-of-41 for 352 yards and two touchdowns.

Manning returned home to throw for almost 300 yards and a career-high four touchdowns against the St. Louis Rams at Giants Stadium in a 44–24 romp. Two games later, he led a last-minute drive against the Denver Broncos to secure a 24–23 victory for the Giants. The drive culminated in a two-yard touchdown to Amani Toomer with five seconds remaining. Two weeks later, Manning overcame a weak first half against the San Francisco 49ers to help his team secure their first official road victory of the season, 24–6. Despite a poor performance at home against the Minnesota Vikings, throwing four interceptions, he again led his team back to tie the game in the final minutes before the Vikings won on a late field goal.

Manning finished among the top five quarterbacks in both passing yards and touchdown passes, while leading an offense that finished third in the NFL in scoring with a total of 422 points. It was the most points the Giants scored in a single season since 1963. The Giants won the NFC East with an 11–5 record and advanced to the postseason as the #4-seed. In the Wild Card Round against the Carolina Panthers, Manning was 10-of-18 for 113 yards and three interceptions in the 23–0 loss.

=== 2006 season ===
Manning's second full season was reminiscent of his 2005 season. He started off playing well and completed over 65 percent of his passes through the first four games. However, he struggled in the second half of the season and his production diminished towards the end of the regular season. After losing a tough game to his brother Peyton and the Indianapolis Colts on opening day, Manning and the Giants rebounded from a 24–7 fourth quarter deficit en route to a 30–24 overtime victory over the division rival Philadelphia Eagles in Week 2. Manning threw for a career-high 371 yards in the win with three touchdowns including a game-winning pass to Plaxico Burress in overtime to earn NFC Offensive Player of the Week. Following a poor performance against the Seattle Seahawks the next week, Manning and the Giants responded by winning five straight games including wins over the Washington Redskins, Dallas Cowboys and Atlanta Falcons, to push their record to 6–2.

Following this winning streak, key injuries including one to wide receiver Amani Toomer pushed Manning and the Giants into a downward slide. Playing against the Chicago Bears, Manning started well, but the Giants' offense was derailed by the loss of left tackle Luke Petitgout to a broken leg. Manning was held to only 141 yards passing with two interceptions. Petitgout's loss left a gaping hole at the crucial left tackle position, and Manning was unable to repeat his first-half success. Manning struggled the next week against the Jacksonville Jaguars and the week after that, a costly interception helped to culminate a huge collapse on the road against the Tennessee Titans, with the Giants seeing a 21-point fourth quarter lead simply evaporate. Manning improved the following week, throwing for 270 yards and two touchdowns against the Dallas Cowboys, but the Giants lost 23–20. Finally regaining momentum, Manning threw three touchdowns in a win on the road against the Carolina Panthers, but then he stumbled badly in the final three games. He threw two interceptions against the Philadelphia Eagles and tallied only 73 passing yards in a game against the New Orleans Saints. Although the Giants battled back to 8–8 the following week on the road against the Washington Redskins, Manning completed only 12 of 26 passes for 101 yards and one touchdown. The Giants qualified for the postseason as the #6-seed and met the Philadelphia Eagles. Although he did significantly better in this game than the 2005 playoff game against the Carolina Panthers, completing 16 of 27 passes for 161 yards and two touchdowns, the Giants lost in the Wild Card Round on a last-second field goal by the Eagles.

For the year, Manning threw for 3,244 yards, 24 touchdowns, and 18 interceptions. He completed 57.7 percent of his passes, a five-point improvement from 2005, but he again struggled badly in the second half of the season. Manning finished the season with a quarterback efficiency rating of 77.0 (18th in the league) with 6.2 yards per attempt.

=== 2007 season: Super Bowl champions ===
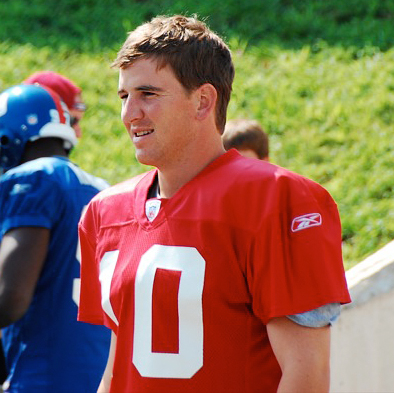
Manning in 2007

Manning trained in the Meadowlands with offensive coordinator Kevin Gilbride and new quarterbacks coach Chris Palmer prior to the 2007 regular season. For the first time ever, Plaxico Burress and Jeremy Shockey practiced in the off-season with Manning to perfect their timing and chemistry rather than training alone in Miami as they did in previous years.

==== 2007 regular season ====
Manning opened the 2007 season with an outstanding personal performance against the Dallas Cowboys, completing 28 of 41 passing attempts for 312 yards, four touchdowns, and an interception in New York's 45–35 loss. However, he suffered a shoulder sprain and was removed from the game late in the second half. Although he did play against the Green Bay Packers in Week 2 while throwing for 211 yards with one touchdown, the Giants defense performed poorly again and the team dropped to 0–2 with Green Bay winning, 35–13. In week three, Manning got a come-from-behind victory as the Giants defense improved, pitching a shutout in the second half and stopping the Washington Redskins on a fourth and goal situation, winning the game 24–17. The Giants defense then shut down the Philadelphia Eagles with an NFL record-tying 12 sacks, holding the Eagles offense to one field goal. The Giants won with a score of 16–3. The following week, Manning overcame a dismal first half to throw for two second-half scores in a 35–24 win over their in-city rivals, the New York Jets.

Following two straight home victories, Manning and the Giants obtained their fourth consecutive victory with a 31–10 defeat of the Atlanta Falcons in the Georgia Dome on Monday Night Football. Manning performed well, completing 27 of 39 passes for 303 yards along with a pair of touchdowns while giving away two interceptions. Behind a dominant defensive effort, the Giants improved to 5–2 the next week with a 33–15 win over the San Francisco 49ers. Manning played well again, throwing for two touchdowns in the effort. In week 8, the Giants played a road game against the Miami Dolphins on October 28, 2007, in London's Wembley Stadium. Manning only threw for 59 yards in the rain and mud, but he scored the Giants' only touchdown on a 10-yard run. This touchdown was the first in an NFL regular season game that was played outside of North America. The Giants defeated the Dolphins, 13–10, bringing the Giants to a 6–2 record at the mid-way point of the 2007 season. After losing to their division rivals the Dallas Cowboys in Week 9, New York Giants co-owner John Mara publicly questioned Manning's ability to lead the Giants in 2007, but more importantly, in the future:

The only thing we evaluate is 'Can we win with this guy?' That's the one thing. When we talk about any player at the end of the season, the No.1 question is 'Will he help us win?' And to take it one step further, 'Can we win a championship with this guy?'

— John Mara

After a week of criticism in the New York media and being outplayed by Cowboys quarterback Tony Romo, Manning had a bounce-back victory against their conference Wild Card competitors the Detroit Lions. Manning threw for 283 yards and one touchdown but most importantly, no interceptions in a critical road game.

The following week in a 41–17 loss to the Minnesota Vikings, Manning threw four interceptions and had three of them returned for touchdowns. He continued to struggle until the last game of the season, against the 15–0 New England Patriots. With a playoff spot secured, the Giants could have rested their starters for the playoffs, but they instead chose to keep in the regulars and attempt to stop New England's quest for an undefeated regular season. The Giants lost 38–35, with Manning completing 22 of 32 passes for 252 yards, with four touchdowns and one interception.

==== 2007 playoffs ====
The Giants entered the playoffs as the #5-seed. On January 6, 2008, in the Wild Card Round, Manning went 20-of-27 for 185 yards playing on the road against the Tampa Bay Buccaneers. The underdog Giants won 24–14, and Manning had two touchdown passes.

On January 13, 2008, in the Divisional Round Manning led the Giants to an upset victory over the heavily favored Dallas Cowboys, the number one seed in the NFC. For the third straight game, Manning played well, completing 12 of 18 passes for 163 yards and two touchdowns with no interceptions. The Giants were the first team to beat an NFC number one seed in the Divisional Round since the start of the 12-team format in 1990. This victory secured an NFC Championship berth against the Green Bay Packers on January 20, 2008. In the NFC Championship, the Giants beat the Packers in overtime, with a score of 23–20 in one of the coldest postseason games in NFL history. The dramatic victory secured Manning and the Giants a trip to Super Bowl XLII. This was the first Super Bowl appearance for the New York Giants since Super Bowl XXXV in 2001.

==== Super Bowl XLII ====
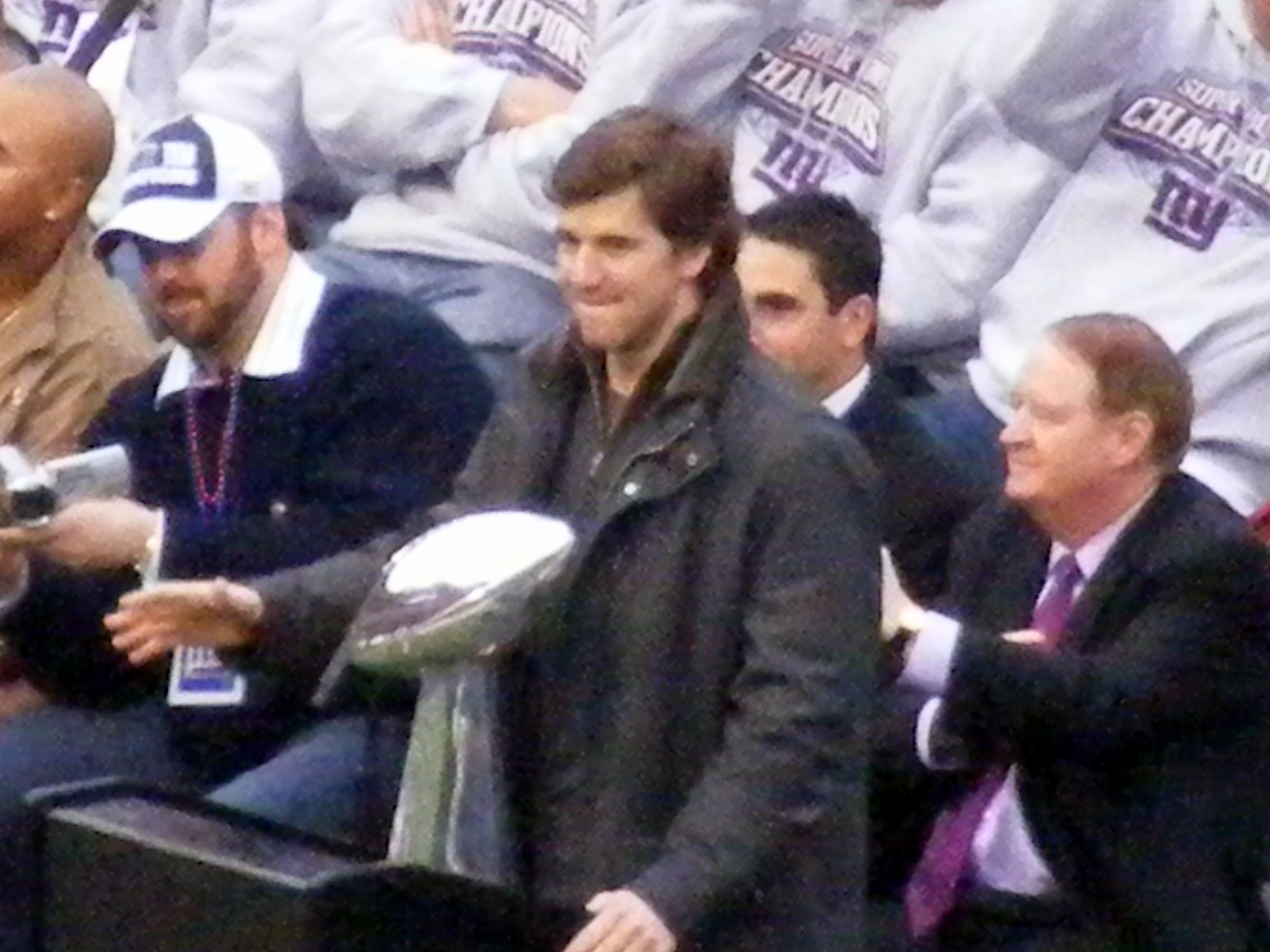
Manning with the Lombardi Trophy during the Giants Super Bowl victory rally at Giants Stadium

In front of a record-setting U.S. television audience and on the strength of a late fourth-quarter drive led by Manning, the Giants beat the 12.5-point-favored, undefeated New England Patriots, 17–14.

Manning takes the snap, back to throw, under pressure, avoids the rush and he's gonna...fight out of it, still fights out of it, now throws it deep down field, wide open Tyree who... MAKES THE CATCH! AT THE 24-YARD LINE! What a play by Manning!

— Bob Papa, calling Manning's completion to David Tyree

Trailing 14–10 with 2:42 remaining, Manning led the Giants on a game-winning 83-yard touchdown drive. On a crucial third-and-5 at the Giants' 44-yard line, Manning connected with David Tyree on a play in which he avoided several sacks and Tyree caught the ball off his helmet for a large gain. Four plays later, Plaxico Burress caught a 13-yard touchdown pass with 35 seconds remaining for the winning margin. Manning became only the second quarterback in NFL history to throw two go-ahead fourth-quarter touchdowns in a Super Bowl (Joe Montana was the first, in Super Bowl XXIII in 1989). He also became the first quarterback to throw a last-minute, championship-winning touchdown in the NFL title game (including the pre-Super Bowl era) when a field goal would not at least tie the game.

Manning was named the Most Valuable Player of Super Bowl XLII. He and his brother Peyton are the only pair of brothers to play quarterback in the Super Bowl and the only pair of brothers to win Super Bowl MVP, doing so in successive years.

For winning Super Bowl MVP, Manning was given his choice of any 2008 model Cadillac. He chose an Escalade Hybrid. The Wednesday after the Super Bowl, he appeared on the Late Show with David Letterman.

=== 2008 season: NFC East champions ===
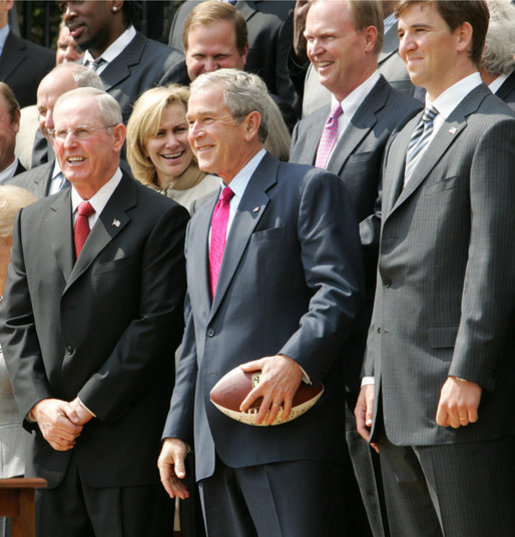
Manning (right) and head coach Tom Coughlin (left) with President Bush on April 30, 2008

Manning and the Giants opened the 2008 season with a win over their division rivals, the Washington Redskins, 16–7. Manning completed 19 passes of 35 for 216 yards, and had one rushing touchdown and one interception. Post-match, he said: "It was a great opening to the season. There was a lot of emotion, a lot of excitement. You could feel it in the crowd." In the Giants' next game, against the St. Louis Rams, they won again, 41–13, behind a stellar Manning performance. Manning finished the game with 20 completions, 260 yards passing and threw three touchdowns to three different receivers. The victory also marked the team's fourth straight victory over the Rams. The following week, Manning rallied the Giants to more fourth-quarter magic, overcoming a late deficit to throw the go-ahead touchdown pass to tight end Kevin Boss, and then in overtime, throwing a clutch 31-yard pass to Amani Toomer in the Giants' 26–23 win over Cincinnati Bengals. The fourth week of the season saw the Giants score on each of their first six possessions and dominate the Seattle Seahawks, 44–6. Manning threw for two touchdowns, completing 19 of 25 passes for 267 yards as the Giants totaled 523 yards on offense, their most since 2002.

Following a poor team performance in a 35–14 loss on the road against the Cleveland Browns, Manning and the Giants responded with a 29–17 win over the 49ers and battled to a hard earned 21–14 win over the Pittsburgh Steelers at Pittsburgh's Heinz Field. Manning completed 19 of 32 passes for 199 yards and one touchdown in the crucial win, which pushed the Giants to a 6–1 record. The following week, the Giants beat the Dallas Cowboys at home 35–14 to get to 7–1 at the midway point of the regular season. Manning threw three touchdowns in the game. New York improved to 8–1 with a 36–31 win on the road against the Philadelphia Eagles. Manning threw two touchdowns in the victory, but the crucial play occurred in the third quarter. With the Giants trailing by four, Manning appeared to make an illegal forward pass to tight end Boss. After review, it was determined that the pass was legal. The Giants scored a touchdown two plays later. Week nine pitted the Giants in a battle with the visiting Baltimore Ravens. The Ravens had come into the game with the league's third-ranked defense; nevertheless, Manning led the Giants to a decisive 30–10 victory, improving to 9–1, which included a 200-yard rushing effort by running backs Brandon Jacobs, Derrick Ward and Ahmad Bradshaw. Two weeks later, the Giants faced the Redskins at Washington in their second encounter in the season. Manning threw his first 300-yard game of the season going 21-of-34 with an interception and a 40-yard touchdown pass to Toomer. The Giants beat the Redskins 23–7. In November, Manning was named the NFC Offensive Player of the Month. For the month, Manning threw for 1,036 yards and ten touchdowns, and compiled a 94.9 passer rating while leading the Giants to a perfect 5–0 record.

Manning was named to his first Pro Bowl on December 16, making him the first Giants quarterback to earn the honor since Phil Simms in 1993. In week 15, Manning and the Giants visited Texas Stadium, where Tony Romo battled through a lower back contusion and connected with nine different receivers, finishing 20-of-30 for 244 yards and two touchdowns leading the Dallas Cowboys to a 20–8 victory. In week 16 against the Carolina Panthers with NFC homefield advantage on the line, Manning had a passing day of 17 of 27 for 181 yards and no interceptions. Manning led the Giants back from deficits of 21–10 and 28–20 to tie the game with just over three minutes left, including a bullet pass to Domenik Hixon for a key two-point conversion to tie the game at 28. The game was played in freezing conditions.

After becoming the No. 1 seed in the NFC with a 12–4 record, the Giants had a first playoff round bye week and homefield advantage through the rest of the playoffs. In the Divisional Round, they faced their archrival Philadelphia Eagles at Giants Stadium with its signature windy conditions. Philadelphia went on to win the game 23–11. Manning completed 15 out of 29 passes for 169 yards with no touchdowns and two interceptions.

=== 2009 season ===
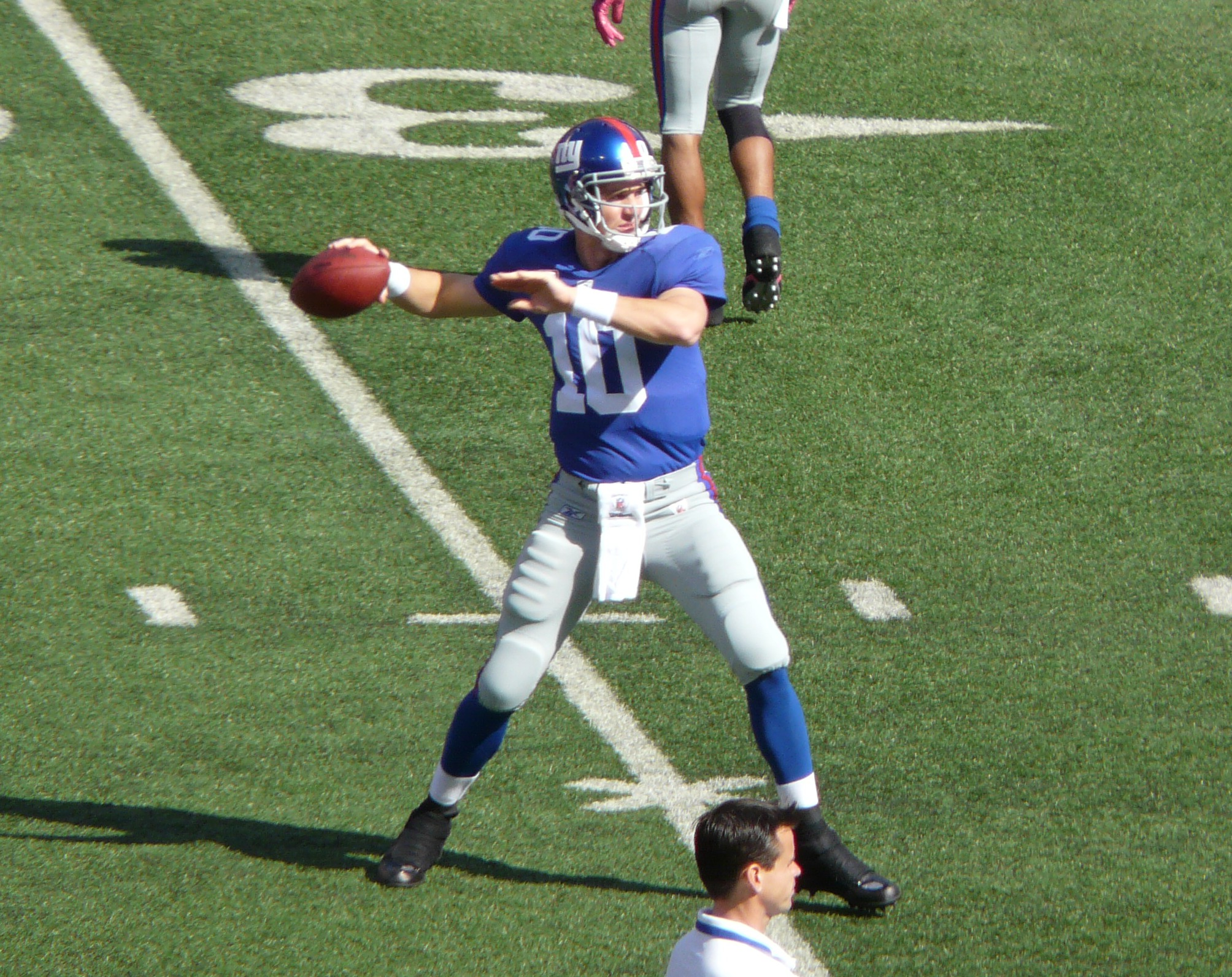
Manning in pre-game warmups in 2009

On August 5, 2009, Manning signed a six-year US$97.5 million contract extension.

Manning and the Giants started the 2009 season with a 3–0 record. In Week 4, the Giants played the Kansas City Chiefs. Manning was playing well up until the start of the fourth quarter when on a play-action fake, he injured his heel while passing downfield to Steve Smith. He stayed in for the next play completing a 54-yard touchdown to Hakeem Nicks. It was discovered that Manning had plantar fasciitis (inflammation of connective tissue within the soles of the feet) and there was speculation he would not play against the Oakland Raiders in Week 5. However, in Week 5, Manning played well, completing eight of ten passes for 173 yards and two touchdowns with the Giants winning 44–7. This was the first time in his career that Manning had a posted a perfect passer rating.

After this five-game winning streak, the Giants fell to a four-game losing streak, losing to the New Orleans Saints, the Arizona Cardinals, the Philadelphia Eagles and the San Diego Chargers, before winning again after a bye week on Week 11 when they played the Atlanta Falcons, winning 34–31 in overtime. Against the Falcons, Manning posted a career-high 384 passing yards with three touchdowns and one interception.

On Thanksgiving, the Giants traveled to Denver to play the Denver Broncos where they lost 26–6. Manning completed 24 of 40 passes for 230 yards, with no touchdowns and an interception. In Week 14, they played their divisional rivals, the Philadelphia Eagles, and lost 45–38, where it was a close game from the start. Manning passed for a career-high 391 yards, three touchdowns and no interceptions but was not able to win the game. Next week, on Monday Night Football, Manning and the Giants dominated the Washington Redskins, winning the game 45–12.

The next week, in the final game in Giants Stadium, Manning and the Giants lost 41–9 against the Carolina Panthers. The Giants did not fare better the next week on the road against the Minnesota Vikings in the final regular season game, losing 44–7 while down 38 points in the fourth quarter. After the games, Manning apologized to the fans for the team's performance. The Giants finished the 2009 season with an 8–8 record and missed the playoffs.

Manning ended the 2009 season with career highs including 4,021 passing yards, 27 touchdowns, a 62.3 completion percentage rating, and a passer rating of 93.1.

=== 2010 season ===
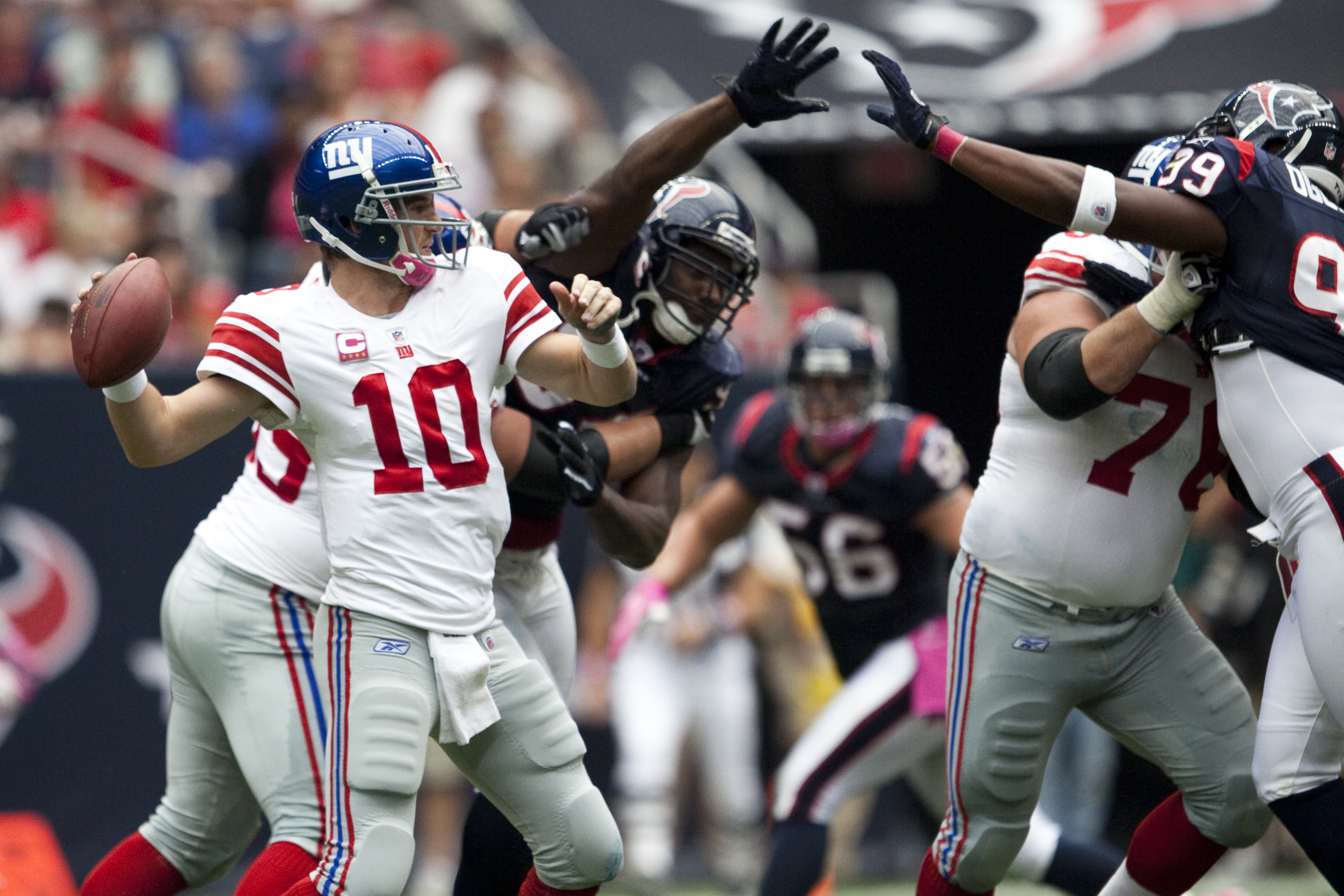
Manning against the Houston Texans in October 2010

On August 16 during a preseason game against the New York Jets, Manning was hit by Brandon Jacobs, then by Calvin Pace, which knocked off his helmet, then went face first into Jim Leonhard's face mask. As a result, Manning had a large gash that needed 12 stitches, and he left the game.

Manning and the Giants started the 2010 season with a 1–2 start followed by a five-game winning streak. In Week 15, he had 289 passing yards, four touchdowns, and one interception in the 38–31 loss to the Philadelphia Eagles. In Week 16, Manning connected on with Mario Manningham on a then-career-high 85-yard receiving touchdown in a 45–17 loss to the Green Bay Packers. The mark was broken the next week when Manning completed a 92-yard passing touchdown to Manningham in the 17–14 victory over the Washington Redskins. The Giants ended the 2010 NFL season with a 10–6 record. Manning led the Giants to a 17–14 win in the last game of the season against the Redskins, however, because of the Packers' 10–3 win over the Chicago Bears, the Giants did not make the playoffs. He ended the season with 4,002 yards, a career-high 31 touchdowns, but also a career-high 25 interceptions, which marked the most by a quarterback in the 2010 season, and a 62.5 completion percentage.

=== 2011 season: Second Super Bowl championship ===
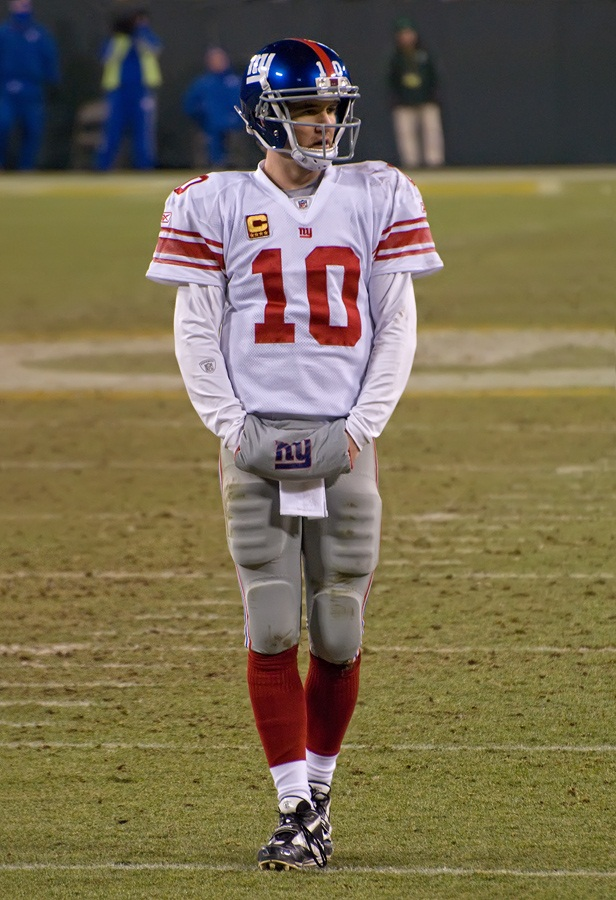
Manning on January 15, 2012, in Green Bay

In August 2011, Manning generated mild controversy in the sports media during a radio interview on The Michael Kay Show. When asked by host Michael Kay whether he was an elite "Top 10, Top 5" quarterback in the same class as Tom Brady, he responded:

I consider myself in that class. Tom Brady is a great quarterback... I think now he's grown up and gotten better every year and that's what I'm trying to do. I kind of hope these next seven years of my quarterback days are my best.

Manning received criticism for the quote for trying to inflate his own status and skills, with critics pointing out his past inconsistent stats, including his 25 interceptions in the previous season, as evidence contradicting his claims. However, Manning also received support for his comments from Giants coach Tom Coughlin, and teammates such as wide receiver Hakeem Nicks. Later in the season, Dallas Cowboys defensive coordinator Rob Ryan commented on the quote, agreeing with Manning that he was an elite quarterback "for sure."

==== 2011 regular season ====
The Giants opened the 2011 season with a slow start, losing to the rival Washington Redskins 28–14– in an emotional game for both fanbases on the 10th anniversary of the September 11 attacks. Manning completed 18 of 32 passes for 268 yards but threw a costly interception in the third quarter to linebacker Ryan Kerrigan, who returned it for a touchdown and swung the momentum of the game. However, the Giants recovered and won their next three games, including over the arch-rival Philadelphia Eagles, where he had 254 passing yards and four touchdowns in the 29–16 victory to earn NFC Offensive Player of the Week. During this streak, Manning improved, throwing for 266 yards per game with eight total touchdowns and one interception.

After a 6–2 start, including a 24–20 last-minute comeback by Manning over the New England Patriots that evoked comparisons to Super Bowl XLII, the Giants entered a tough stretch of their schedule, facing off against the San Francisco 49ers, the New Orleans Saints and the Green Bay Packers, the respective eventual NFC West, South and North champions. The Giants lost all three games as well as falling to the Philadelphia Eagles at home, leading them into a four-game skid and once again putting their postseason hopes in jeopardy. However, unlike the previous three seasons, the Giants finished strong, winning three of their last four games. This included a key win over their crosstown rival New York Jets, where Manning tied an NFL record by completing a 99-yard touchdown pass to Victor Cruz, as well as a sweep of their fellow division rival Dallas Cowboys. In the final regular-season game against the Dallas Cowboys, Manning threw for 346 yards and three touchdowns, giving the Giants the win, the NFC East title, and a playoff berth for the first time in three years. He earned a Pro Bowl nomination for his performance in the 2011 season. He threw for at least 400 yards in three separate games, setting a new franchise record.

==== 2011 playoffs ====
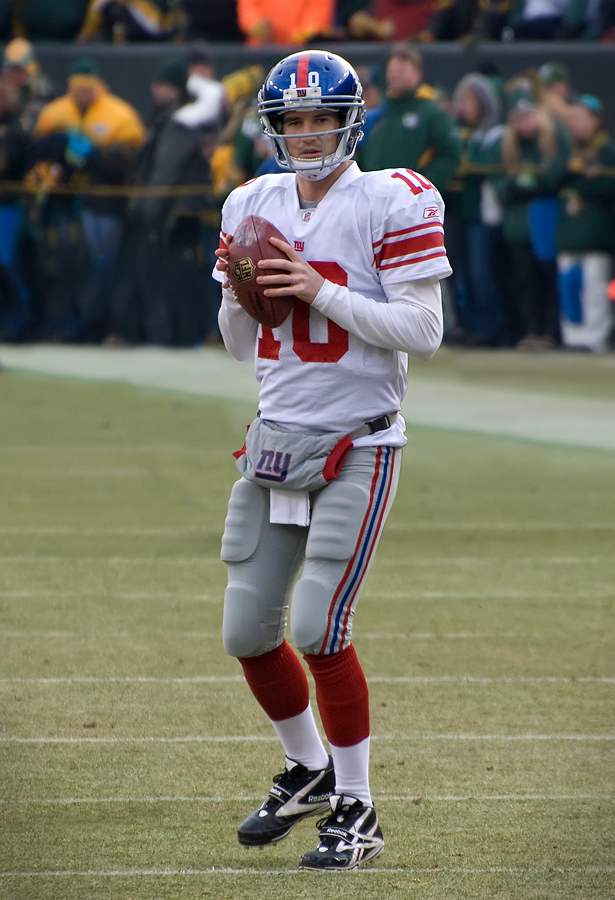
Manning during a playoff game against the Green Bay Packers

The Giants entered the 2011 postseason as underdogs, with the worst record of any NFC playoff team. However, Manning and his team would once again demonstrate their endurance and durability late in the year. The Giants first easily routed the Atlanta Falcons 24–2 in the Wild Card Round and then stunned the defending Super Bowl champions and top-seeded Green Bay Packers in the Divisional Round to advance to the NFC Championship Game. In the win, Manning completed 21 out of 33 attempts and threw three touchdowns and one interception. The following week, the Giants avenged their regular season loss to the San Francisco 49ers with a dramatic 20–17 overtime win in the NFC Championship Game. In the game, Manning set franchise playoff records with 32 completions on 52 attempts, good enough for 316 yards and two touchdowns despite being sacked a franchise-record-tying six times. This victory secured Manning and the Giants a second trip in five years to the Super Bowl, setting up a highly anticipated Super Bowl XLII rematch against Tom Brady and the New England Patriots. The Giants also made history as the first Super Bowl team ever outscored in the regular season (394 points scored, 400 points allowed).

==== Super Bowl XLVI ====
In the most-watched program in the history of United States television, Manning once again led the Giants to an upset victory over the 2 1/2-point-favored Patriots 21–17, his second Super Bowl win and the fourth overall for the franchise.

I was yelling to [Bradshaw], "Don't score, don't score", Manning said. "He tried to stop, but he fell into the end zone."

— Eli Manning, recalling the game-winning touchdown by Ahmad Bradshaw

While trailing the Patriots 15–17 in the final minutes, Manning led the Giants 88 yards down the field to a touchdown that many observers described as "accidental". With just over a minute of time left in the game, the Giants called a running play and Manning handed off the ball to Ahmad Bradshaw with the hopes of stopping short of the goal line and forcing the Patriots to use their final time out, thus allowing the Giants to run out the clock. The Patriots, in turn, did not attempt to tackle Bradshaw in his run, and he then fell over the goal line despite making an attempt to stop. However, the remaining time was not enough for Patriots quarterback Tom Brady to lead a comeback and the Giants held onto the lead to win. Manning was again named the Most Valuable Player of Super Bowl XLVI, becoming the third quarterback in a row to win the award. The Giants also became the first team ever with fewer than ten wins in a 16-game regular season to win the Super Bowl. Manning also became the first quarterback in NFL history to throw for 4,900+ yards and win a Super Bowl in the same season. The Giants were the first team with a running game ranked last (32nd) and a defense ranked as low as 27th to win a Super Bowl.

For winning the Super Bowl, Manning and the Giants received a victory parade in Manhattan and were honored with symbolic keys to the city by Mayor Michael Bloomberg. He was ranked 31st by his fellow players on the NFL Top 100 Players of 2012.

=== 2012 season ===
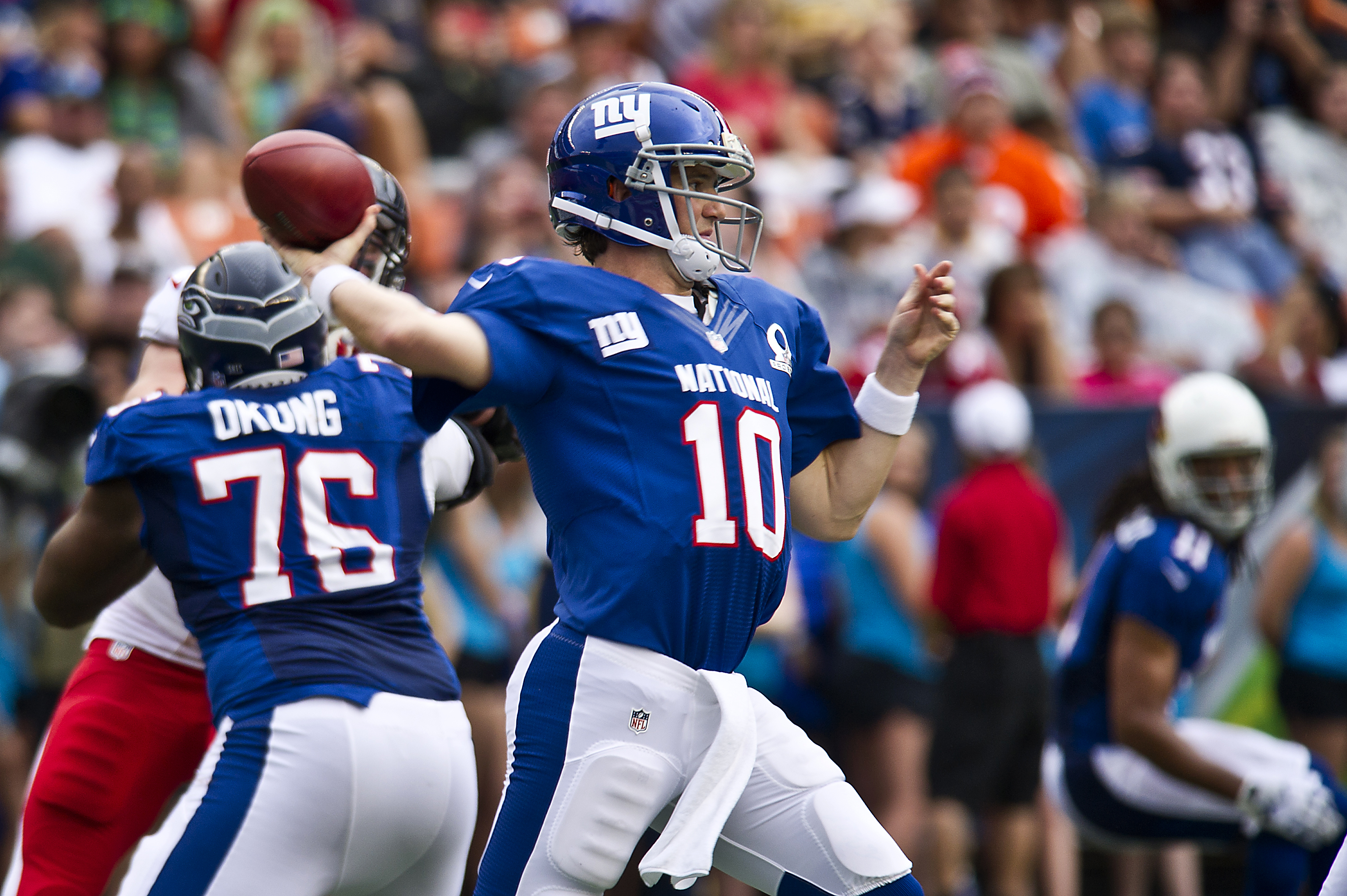
Manning at the 2013 Pro Bowl

The Giants endured a disappointing season following their Super Bowl run in 2011. Manning led the Giants to a 6–2 record to begin their season, including a career-best 510 passing yards to go along with three passing touchdowns and three interceptions in a Week 2 41–34 win over the Tampa Bay Buccaneers. He finished second only to Phil Simms's game with 513 passing yards in 1985 for the franchise record. However, Manning averaged an anemic 204 yards per game and 74.3 passer rating from Week 8 to Week 16, including his lowest rating in five years (38.9) in a 34–0 loss to the Atlanta Falcons in Week 15. He ended the 2012 season on a high note, throwing a career-high five touchdown passes while completing 13 of 21 pass attempts and passing for 208 yards with no interceptions, in a 42–7 Giants win over the Philadelphia Eagles. He finished the season with 26 touchdown passes, 15 interceptions and 3,948 passing yards. As was typical for this phase of his career (2012–2016), Manning was exceptionally well-protected by his offensive line; he was sacked just 19 times for a league-lowest 3.4% of passing plays. Although the Giants did not qualify for the playoffs with a 9–7 season, Manning was selected to his third Pro Bowl as a second alternate. He was ranked 43rd by his fellow players on the NFL Top 100 Players of 2013.

=== 2013 season ===
Manning started the 2013 season off with 450 passing yards, four touchdowns and three interceptions in a 36–31 loss to the Dallas Cowboys. Manning set a franchise record for most passing yards in a season opener, breaking Phil Simms's mark of 409 passing yards in the 1984 regular season opener. The loss was a sign of things to come as the Giants started the season with a 0–6 record, their worst regular season start since 1976. He threw 12 interceptions in his first five games. Manning fell to 0–3 against his older brother, Peyton in Week 2's 41–23 loss to the Denver Broncos. He was 28 of 39 for 362 yards, but was intercepted four times. Manning's four interceptions tied his career high and was the fourth time he threw four interceptions in a game. The game between Peyton and Eli was the final professional meeting of the two brothers. In Week 15, Manning threw for 156 yards and a career-high five interceptions in a 23–0 loss to the eventual Super Bowl XLVIII champion Seattle Seahawks. Manning ended the season with a career-high 27 interceptions, which were the most in one season by a quarterback since Brett Favre had 29 in 2005. The Giants finished the season 7–9, their first losing record since Manning's rookie year in 2004.

Manning passed Phil Simms to become the franchise's all-time leader in yards passing. Simms, who played 14 seasons with the Giants, finished his career with 33,462 yards in the air.

=== 2014 season ===
After an 0–2 start, the Giants won three straight games but subsequently lost their next seven games including a 16–10 loss to the San Francisco 49ers in a game where Manning threw five interceptions, which tied his career high. The Giants won three of their last four games to end the season with a 6–10 record. Among Manning's highlights from the losing season was a Week 17 game where he had 429 passing yards, one touchdown and one interception in a 34–26 loss to the Philadelphia Eagles. Manning finished the season with 30 touchdown passes, 14 interceptions and 4,410 passing yards.

=== 2015 season ===
A few days before the Giants' regular season opener against the Dallas Cowboys, Manning signed a four-year, US$84 million extension with the Giants. In Week 5, he had a franchise-record 41 completions for 441 passing yards, three touchdowns and one interception, in a 30–27 victory over the San Francisco 49ers to earn NFC Offensive Player of the Week. Through six games, he led the Giants to a 3–3 record and a tie for first place in the NFC East. In Week 8, Manning threw a career-high six touchdowns and 350 yards, but the Giants lost to the New Orleans Saints, 52–49. He became the first quarterback in NFL history to throw for six touchdowns and no interceptions in a game and lose. In Week 10, in a narrow 27–26 loss to the undefeated New England Patriots, Manning passed for 361 yards and two touchdowns, one of which was an 87-yard strike to Odell Beckham Jr. in the first quarter. In Week 14, in a 31–24 victory over the Miami Dolphins, he was 27-of-31 for 337 passing yards and four touchdowns to earn NFC Offensive Player of the Week. After starting the season 5–5, Giants fell to 1–5 the rest of the way to finish 6–10 for the second straight season. Manning's longtime coach in Tom Coughlin stepped down at the end of the season.

Manning finished the 2015 season with career highs in touchdown passes (35), completions (387), attempts (618) and passer rating (93.6). His 35 touchdowns were one shy of tying Y. A. Tittle for most in a single season in franchise history and ranked tied for second among quarterbacks that year. Manning also threw 4,432 yards in 2015, second most in his career. On January 22, 2016, Manning was selected to his fourth career Pro Bowl, replacing Ben Roethlisberger. Manning's fourth Pro Bowl berth ties Fran Tarkenton for most Pro Bowl selections by a New York Giants quarterback in franchise history. He was ranked 47th by his fellow players on the NFL Top 100 Players of 2016.

=== 2016 season: Return to the playoffs ===
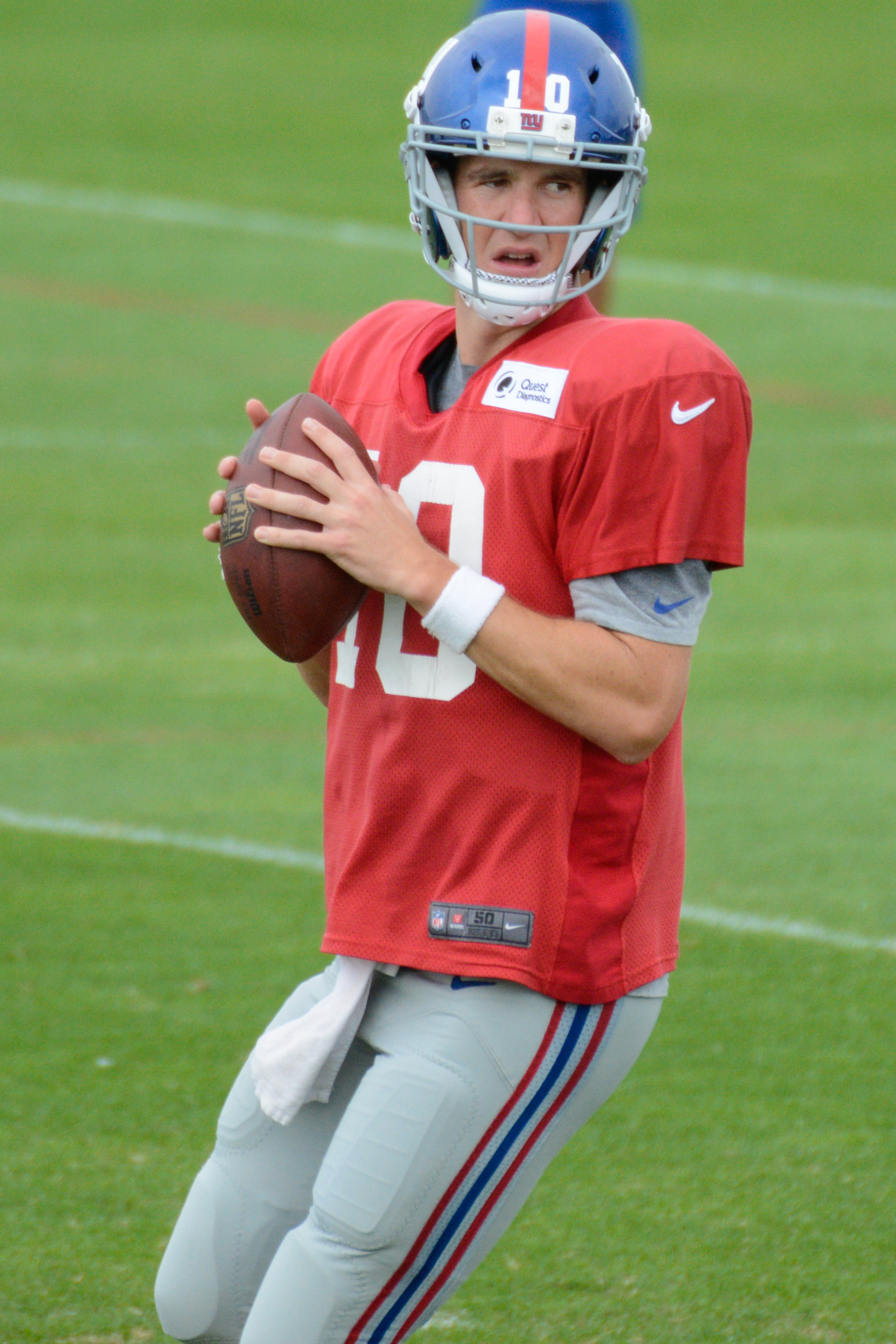
Manning in Giants training camp in 2016

Manning had a new head coach in Ben McAdoo for the 2016 season. Manning and the Giants started the 2016 season with a 2–3 record over the first five games. In the next game, a 27–23 victory over the Baltimore Ravens, Manning threw for three touchdowns, reaching a career total of 302 touchdown passes and passing John Elway for seventh all time.

Coming off a bye week and on a two-game winning streak, beating the Ravens and the Los Angeles Rams, Manning threw a season-high four touchdowns as the Giants would halt a last-second game-winning drive by the Philadelphia Eagles to win 28–23. In a Week 16 loss against the Eagles on December 22, Manning set a franchise record with 63 pass attempts in a single game, while throwing one touchdown and three interceptions, surpassing Peyton Manning's record of 21 games with at least three interceptions with 22. Despite the loss, though, the Tampa Bay Buccaneers lost to the New Orleans Saints later that week 31–24, giving the Giants their first playoff berth since the 2011 season, when the team last won the Super Bowl.

By defeating the rival Washington Redskins in the final week of the NFL season on New Year's Day and, therefore, knocking the Redskins out of playoff contention and bringing their season record to 11–5 (their first winning season since 2012), Manning and the Giants faced the Green Bay Packers in Lambeau Field in the Wild Card Round of the NFL playoffs, as Manning completed 23 of 44 of his passes for 299 yards, while throwing for a touchdown. The Packers defeated the Giants 38–13, ending the Giants' season. Manning finished the season recording 4,027 passing, 26 touchdowns and 16 interceptions, with an 86.0 passer rating.

On February 4, 2017, Manning and Cardinals wide receiver Larry Fitzgerald both won the Walter Payton NFL Man of the Year Award, making it the first time since the 2006 season that two players were co-winners of this award (Drew Brees and LaDainian Tomlinson).

=== 2017 season ===
Manning and the Giants started the 2017 season with five consecutive losses. The Giants broke their losing streak with a 23–10 victory over the Denver Broncos in Week 6. The success was short-lived as the Giants lost the next game to the Seattle Seahawks by a score of 24–7 to set off a three-game losing streak. During Week 9 against the Los Angeles Rams, he became the seventh quarterback to reach 50,000 passing yards. On November 28, after a 2–9 start to the season, it was announced that Manning would be benched and replaced by Geno Smith in Week 13 against the Oakland Raiders, ending Manning's streak of 210 consecutive regular-season games started. The streak was second all-time for quarterbacks behind Brett Favre's 297. Head coach Ben McAdoo gave Manning the option of starting to keep the streak going but Manning declined, stating that "My feeling is that if you are going to play the other guys, play them. Starting just to keep the streak going and knowing you won't finish the game and have a chance to win it is pointless to me, and it tarnishes the streak." The move was met with backlash from former Giants players and coaches. On December 5, two days after the Week 13 game, Manning was renamed the starter by interim head coach Steve Spagnuolo, after McAdoo was fired as head coach. During Week 15 against the Philadelphia Eagles, Manning finished with 434 passing yards, three touchdowns and an interception. The Giants lost 34–29, allowing the Eagles to clinch a first-round bye. On December 24, against the Arizona Cardinals, Manning passed John Elway to take sole possession of sixth place on the NFL's all-time passing yard list. Manning started the regular-season finale against the Washington Redskins. In the 18–10 victory, he had 132 passing yards, one touchdown and one interception, as the Giants ended their disappointing season with a 3–13 record.

=== 2018 season ===
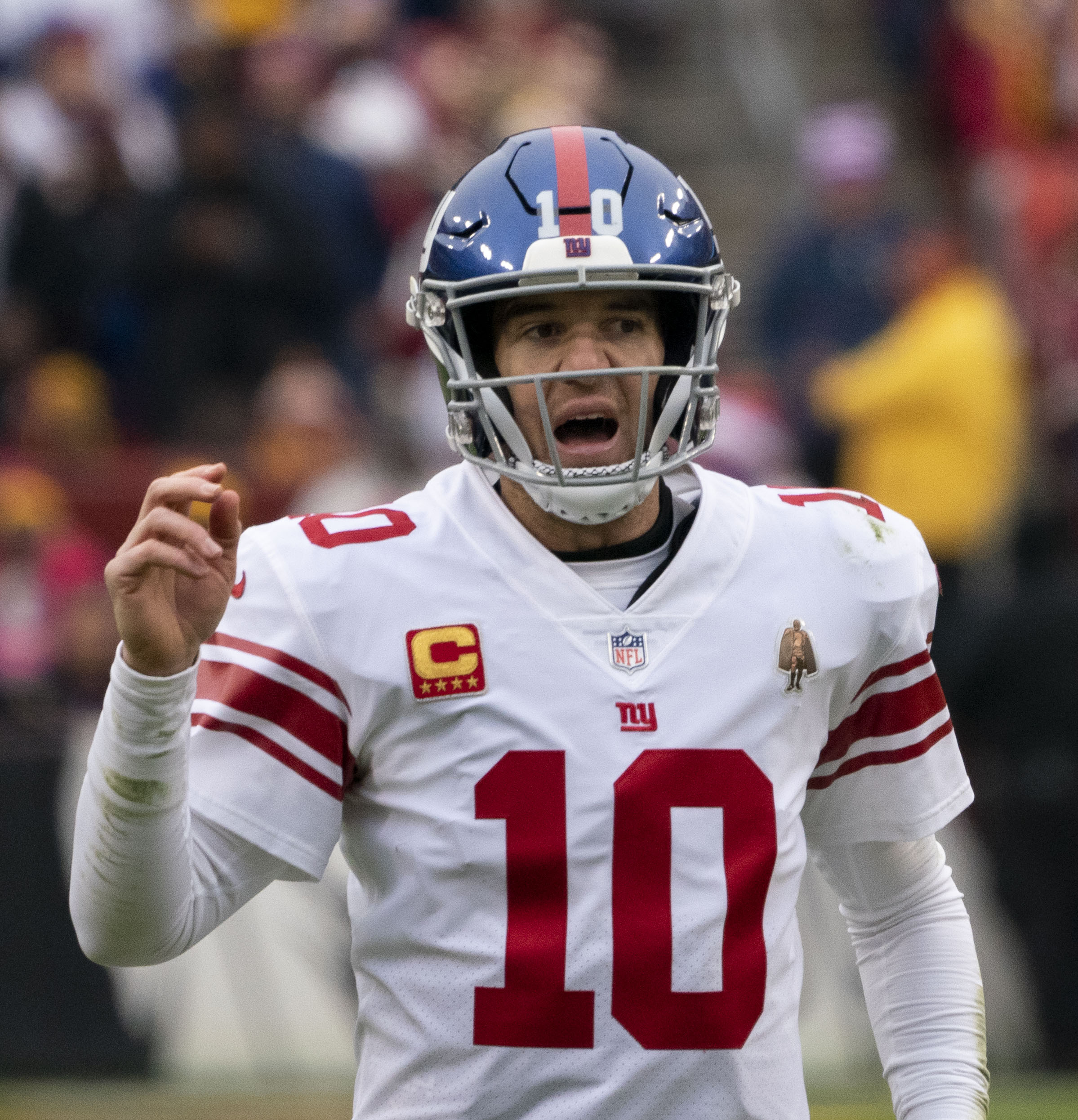
Manning in 2018 at Fedex Field

Following speculation that Manning would be released, new Giants head coach Pat Shurmur put these rumors aside by saying "I think what's important is we have a guy here who has helped this organization win Super Bowls. He's an outstanding player and I'm really looking forward to working with him."

After losses to the Jacksonville Jaguars and Dallas Cowboys to the start the season, Manning and the Giants defeated the Houston Texans by a score of 27–22. Manning was efficient, going 25-of-29 for 297 passing yards and two touchdowns. The Giants lost the next five games, with Manning leading the leagues in sacks for most of that stretch despite an improved running game from rookie Saquon Barkley. Manning had 399 passing yards against the Atlanta Falcons, the fourth of these losses, but was sacked seven times and threw two interceptions in the following game against the Washington Redskins. Manning rebounded with three touchdowns and no interceptions in the following week's 27–23 victory over the San Francisco 49ers, and 17 completions on 18 attempts for two touchdowns in a 38–35 win the following week over the Tampa Bay Buccaneers. The Giants went 4–4 over the last eight games of the season to finish 5–11 and last in the NFC East. Manning passed for 4,299 yards, 21 touchdowns and 11 interceptions in the 2018 season.

=== 2019 season ===
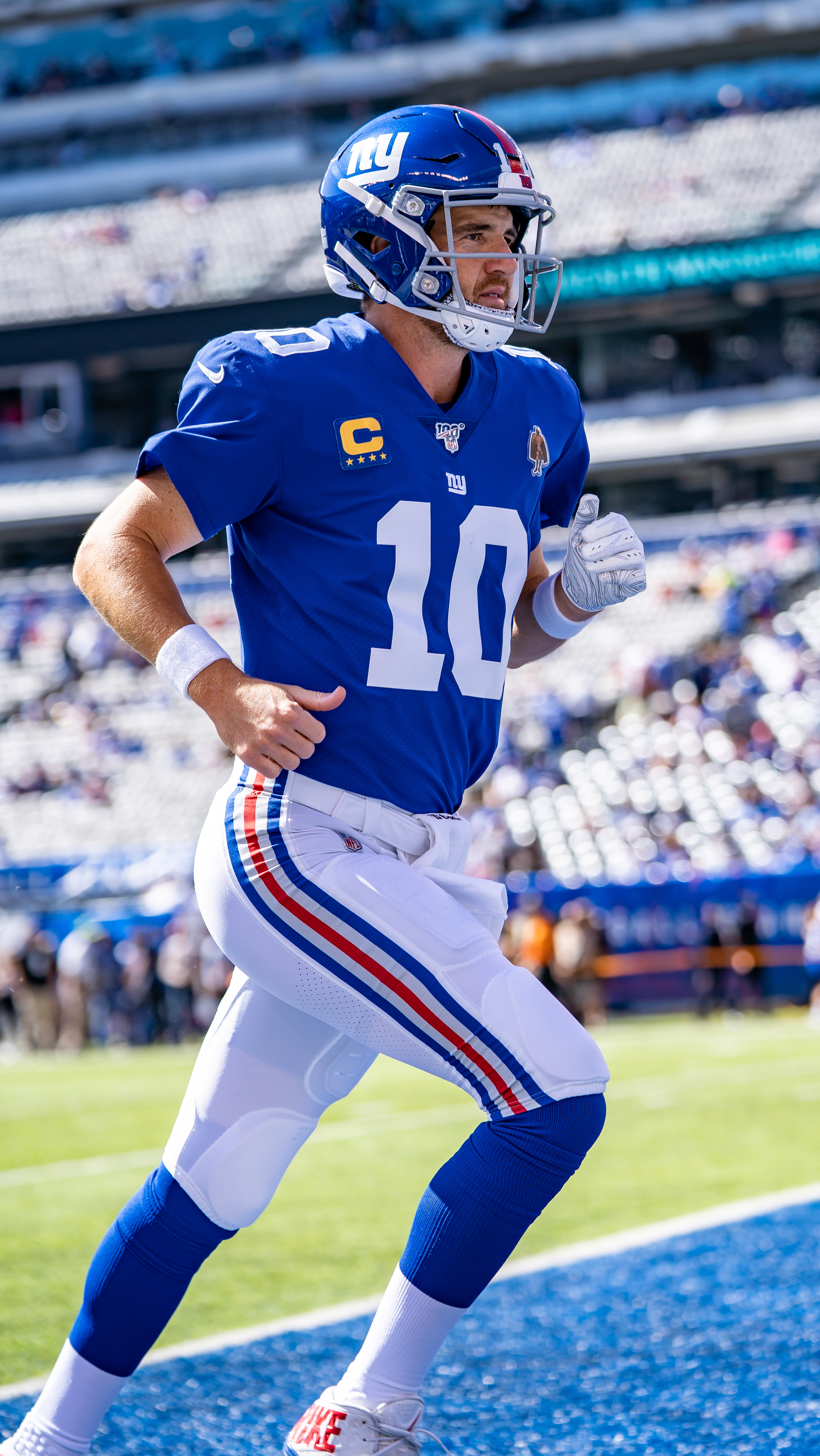
Manning during his final season in September 2019

The 2019 season was Manning's last remaining year on his contract. While the Giants had the option to release Manning in the offseason and save $17 million in both cash and cap space, the team opted to keep him on their roster. However, neither side held any discussions for a contract extension, causing doubt for Manning's future as the Giants' franchise quarterback beyond the upcoming season. The team selected quarterback Daniel Jones in the first round of that year's draft, which many saw as the Giants selecting Manning's successor while further cementing his own lame-duck status in the position. Manning was informed of the Giants' decision during their draft selection. Despite the pick, general manager Dave Gettleman said "the goal is for Eli to be our quarterback", while head coach Shurmur told Manning "it's your job to win games and keep [Jones] off the field".

Being on the Giants' roster meant that it would be Manning's 16th season with the team, marking a franchise record for the longest tenure for any player in its 94-year history. Manning started the Giants' first two games of the season, losses to the Dallas Cowboys and the Buffalo Bills. On September 17, 2019, the Giants announced that Manning would not start the team's Week 3 game against the Tampa Bay Buccaneers, instead opting for Jones. This was thought to be the end of Manning's time as the Giants' starting quarterback.

Due to an ankle injury suffered by Jones during Week 13 against the Green Bay Packers, Manning returned to the starting lineup the next week on December 9 against the Philadelphia Eagles. During the game, Manning threw for 203 yards and two touchdowns to rookie wide receiver Darius Slayton, but the game ended in a 23–17 overtime loss for the Giants. As the game was televised on Monday Night Football, it marked Manning's final primetime appearance. In the following week's game against the Miami Dolphins at home, Manning started again and threw for 283 yards, two touchdowns and three interceptions, leading the team to a 36–20 win. As the game ended, Manning was taken off the field and received a standing ovation from fans who believed this was his final home game as the starting quarterback. Jones returned to action in Week 16 and finished out the season. Manning finished the year with 1,042 passing yards, six touchdowns and five interceptions in four games, as the Giants finished the season 4–12.

With his contract expiring at the end of the season, Manning was set to become a free agent for the first time in his career. When discussing his future plans, Manning stated that he did not wish to be a backup quarterback or pursue coaching opportunities with the team, as he felt he served both roles throughout the year and did not enjoy either one of them. Regardless, he said he would weigh his options for the upcoming season, stating "I think I can still play". During a radio interview weeks later, team co-owner John Mara said that the Giants would welcome back Manning the next year as a backup quarterback or in a front-office role, but that newly hired head coach Joe Judge would need to give his approval to include Manning on the roster.

=== Retirement and honors ===
On January 22, 2020, Manning announced his retirement, with an official press conference scheduled for January 24. John Mara stated during the press conference that Manning would be inducted into the Giants Ring of Honor in 2020 and that Manning's number 10 jersey would be retired.

Manning rejoined the Giants in 2021 in a business operations and fan engagement role, according to the team. His jersey retirement and induction into the Giants' Ring of Honor took place on September 26, 2021, at halftime of the Giants-Atlanta Falcons game at MetLife Stadium. In 2021, he was named to the Louisiana High School Sports Hall of Fame. He became eligible for Pro Football Hall of Fame induction in 2025.

=== "The Manning Bowl" ===
Eli and Peyton Manning played against each other three times in the regular season during their professional careers. These encounters were colloquially dubbed "The Manning Bowl", and Peyton's teams, twice with the Colts and once with the Broncos, held a 3–0 record over Eli and the New York Giants. The first Manning Bowl was held on September 10, 2006, and Peyton's Colts defeated Eli's Giants by a score of 26–21. The second Manning Bowl was held on September 19, 2010, with Peyton and the Colts beating Eli's Giants again by a score of 38–14. The third and final Manning Bowl was held on September 15, 2013, and Peyton and the Broncos beat Eli's Giants 41–23. They faced each other in two Pro Bowls, in 2009 and 2013, both won by the NFC. However, they never faced each other in the playoffs as both always played in separate conferences and never made the Super Bowl at the same time.

Additionally, each quarterback coincidentally played in a Super Bowl held at his brother's home stadium; in February 2012, Eli's Giants defeated the New England Patriots in Super Bowl XLVI at Lucas Oil Stadium, Peyton's home stadium with Indianapolis. Two years later in February 2014, Peyton's Broncos lost to the Seattle Seahawks in Super Bowl XLVIII at MetLife Stadium, Eli's home stadium with New York.

== Career statistics ==
Legend
	Super Bowl MVP
	Won the Super Bowl
	NFL record
	Led the league
**Bold**	Career high

=== NFL ===
==== Regular season ====
Year	Team	Games			Passing									Rushing					Sacked		Fumbles	
Year	Team	GP	GS	Record	Cmp	Att	Pct	Yds	Y/A	Lng	TD	Int	Rtg	Att	Yds	Y/A	Lng	TD	Sck	SckY	Fum	Lost
2004	NYG	9	7	1–6	95	197	48.2	1,043	5.3	52	6	9	55.4	6	35	**5.8**	15	0	13	83	3	1
2005	NYG	16	16	11–5	294	557	52.8	3,762	6.8	78	24	17	75.9	29	**80**	2.8	14	**1**	28	184	9	2
2006	NYG	16	16	8–8	301	522	57.7	3,244	6.2	55	24	18	77.0	25	21	0.8	9	0	25	186	9	2
2007	NYG	16	16	10–6	297	529	56.1	3,336	6.3	60	23	20	73.9	29	69	2.4	**18**	**1**	27	217	**13**	7
2008	NYG	16	16	**12–4**	289	479	60.3	3,238	6.8	48	21	10	86.4	20	10	0.5	13	**1**	27	174	5	2
2009	NYG	16	16	8–8	317	509	62.3	4,021	7.9	74	27	14	93.1	17	65	3.8	14	0	30	216	**13**	**8**
2010	NYG	16	16	10–6	339	539	62.9	4,002	7.4	92	31	25	85.3	32	70	2.2	16	0	16	117	7	5
2011	NYG	16	16	9–7	359	589	61.0	**4,933**	**8.4**	**99**	29	16	92.9	**35**	15	0.4	12	**1**	28	199	8	4
2012	NYG	16	16	9–7	321	536	59.9	3,948	7.4	80	26	15	87.2	20	30	1.5	13	0	19	136	4	1
2013	NYG	16	16	7–9	317	551	57.5	3,818	6.9	70	18	**27**	69.4	18	36	2.0	14	0	39	281	7	2
2014	NYG	16	16	6–10	379	601	63.1	4,410	7.3	80	30	14	92.1	12	31	2.6	**18**	**1**	28	187	7	4
2015	NYG	16	16	6–10	**387**	**618**	62.6	4,432	7.2	87	**35**	14	**93.6**	20	61	3.1	**18**	0	27	157	11	4
2016	NYG	16	16	11–5	377	598	63.0	4,027	6.7	75	26	16	86.0	21	−9	−0.4	6	0	21	142	7	4
2017	NYG	15	15	3–12	352	571	61.6	3,468	6.1	77	19	13	80.4	12	26	2.2	14	**1**	31	189	11	5
2018	NYG	16	16	5–11	380	576	**66.0**	4,299	7.5	58	21	11	92.4	15	20	1.3	7	**1**	**47**	**358**	7	4
2019	NYG	4	4	1–3	91	147	61.9	1,042	7.1	55	6	5	82.6	4	7	1.8	6	0	5	44	3	1
Career		236	234	117–117	4,895	8,119	60.3	57,023	7.0	99	366	244	84.1	315	567	1.8	18	7	411	2,870	125	56

==== Postseason ====
Year	Team	Games			Passing									Rushing					Sacked		Fumbles	
Year	Team	GP	GS	Record	Cmp	Att	Pct	Yds	Y/A	Lng	TD	Int	Rtg	Att	Yds	Y/A	Lng	TD	Sck	SckY	Fum	Lost
2005	NYG	1	1	0–1	10	18	55.6	113	6.3	25	0	**3**	35.0	0	0	0.0	0	0	4	22	1	**1**
2006	NYG	1	1	0–1	16	27	59.3	161	6.0	29	2	1	85.6	2	4	2.0	2	0	1	7	0	0
2007	NYG	4	4	**4–0**	72	119	60.5	854	7.2	52	6	1	95.7	**8**	10	1.3	5	0	9	47	**2**	0
2008	NYG	1	1	0–1	15	29	51.7	169	5.8	34	0	2	40.7	1	0	0.0	0	0	0	0	0	0
2011	NYG	4	4	**4–0**	**106**	**163**	**65.0**	**1,219**	**7.5**	**72**	**9**	1	**103.3**	**8**	**20**	2.5	**14**	0	**11**	**75**	1	0
2016	NYG	1	1	0–1	23	44	52.3	299	6.8	51	1	1	72.1	1	11	**11.0**	11	0	2	4	1	**1**
Career		12	12	8–4	242	400	60.5	2,815	7.0	72	18	9	87.4	20	45	2.3	14	0	27	155	5	2

==== Super Bowl ====
Year	SB	Team	Opp.	Passing								Rushing				Result
Year	SB	Team	Opp.	Cmp	Att	Pct	Yds	Y/A	TD	Int	Rtg	Att	Yds	Y/A	TD	Result
2007	XLII	NYG	NE	19	34	55.9	255	**7.5**	**2**	**1**	87.3	**3**	**4**	**1.3**	0	**W** 17–14
2011	XLVI	NYG	NE	**30**	**40**	**75.0**	**296**	7.4	1	0	**103.7**	1	-1	-1.0	0	**W** 21–17
Career				49	74	66.2	551	7.5	3	1	96.2	4	3	0.8	0	W−L 2–0

=== College ===
Legend
Led the SEC

Season	Team	GP	Passing							Rushing			
Season	Team	GP	Cmp	Att	Pct	Yds	TD	Int	Rtg	Att	Yds	Avg	TD
1999	Ole Miss	0	(redshirt) Redshirted										
2000	Ole Miss	6	16	33	48.5	170	0	1	85.7	7	4	**0.6**	0
2001	Ole Miss	11	259	408	**63.5**	2,948	**31**	9	144.8	31	**9**	0.3	0
2002	Ole Miss	13	**279**	**481**	58.0	3,401	21	**15**	125.6	39	−120	−3.0	2
2003	Ole Miss	13	275	441	62.4	**3,600**	29	10	**148.1**	**48**	−28	−0.6	**3**
Total		43	829	1,363	60.8	10,119	81	35	137.7	128	−135	−1.1	5

== Career highlights ==
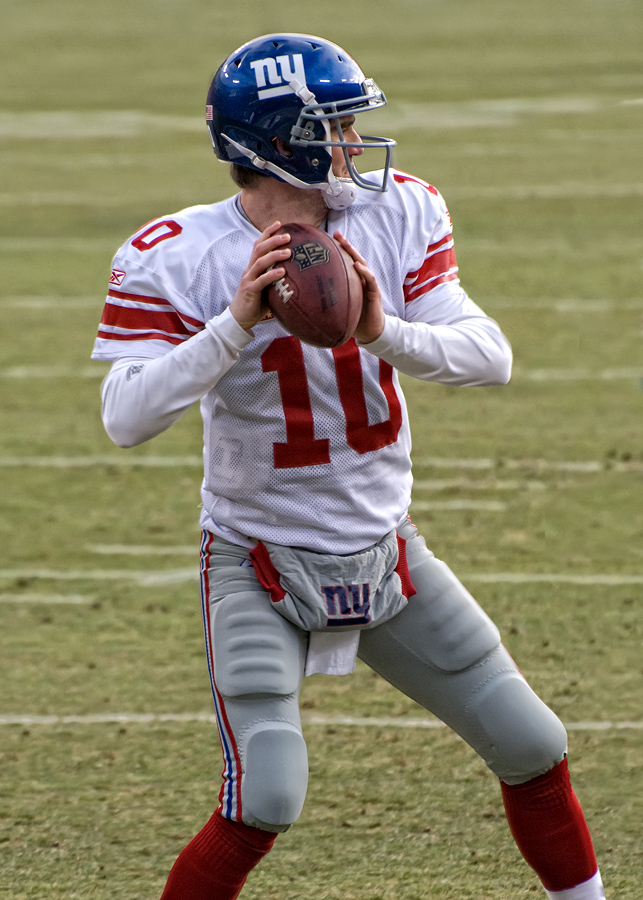
Manning drops back to pass on January 15, 2012.

=== Awards and honors ===
==== NFL ====
- 2× Super Bowl champion (XLII, XLVI)
- 2× Super Bowl MVP (XLII, XLVI)
- 2× NFC champion (2007, 2011)
- 4× Pro Bowl (2008, 2011, 2012, 2015)
- NFC passing touchdowns co-leader (2015)
- The Sporting News Athlete of the Year (2008)
- Walter Payton NFL Man of the Year (2016)
- Bart Starr Award (2020)
- PFWA Good Guy Award (2020)
- The Daily News New York Sportsperson of the Year (2008)
- Hickok Belt (January 2012)
- NFC Offensive Player of the Month (November 2008)
- 4× NFC Offensive Player of the Week (Week 2, 2006; Week 3, 2011; Week 5, 2015; Week 14, 2015)
- 2× PFW NFL Offensive Player of the Week (Week 2, 2006; Week 14, 2011)
- 3× NFL Top 100 — 31st (2012), 43rd( 2013), 47th (2016)
- New York Giants Ring of Honor
- New York Giants No. 10 retired
- 8th greatest New York Giant of all-time
- The Athletic's New York Giants All-2010s Team
- ESPN's New York Giants 2010s Player of the Decade
- ESPN's NFC East All-2010s Team
- Sports Illustrated's New York Giants All-Quarter-Century Team
- New York Post's New York Giants All-Time Team
- New York Post's 3rd Greatest New York Athlete of the Quarter-Century

==== College ====
During his time at Ole Miss, Manning set or tied 47 school records. He was inducted into the University's Hall of Fame in 2004. In 2015, the Shreveport Times, in conjunction with the Independence Bowl, named him the second-greatest player in the bowl game's 40-year history. In 2019, he was the only quarterback selected to the Independence Bowl's All-Time Team. On October 21, 2021, Manning was inducted into the M-Club Hall of Fame, and two days later, the Rebels retired his No. 10 jersey at halftime of its game against LSU. Manning was selected to the 2022 SEC Football Legends Class. In 2023, he was inducted into the Cotton Bowl Hall of Fame.

- 2001: Conerly Trophy – Best College Football Player in Mississippi
- 2001: Davey O'Brien Award (finalist) – Awarded to the Nation's Top Quarterback
- 2001: Honorable mention All-American – The Football News
- 2002: Second-team All-SEC – The Associated Press
- 2002: Independence Bowl MVP
- 2003: Second-team All-American – The Associated Press and Walter Camp Football Foundation
- 2003: First-team All-American – The All-American Foundation and Southern Football Weekly
- 2003: Maxwell Award – Nation's Top Player
- 2003: Conerly Trophy – Best College Football Player in Mississippi
- 2003: SEC MVP – Birmingham Monday Morning Quarterback Club
- 2003: Sports Person of the Year in Mississippi – The Clarion-Ledger
- 2003: Mississippi Amateur Athlete of the Year – Jackson Touchdown Club
- 2003: National Scholar-Athlete Class – Division I-A QB
- 2003: Johnny Unitas Golden Arm Award – Awarded to the Nation's Top Quarterback
- 2003: SEC Offensive Player of the Year – The Associated Press and the SEC Coaches
- 2003: SEC Player of the Year – The Commercial Appeal and the SEC Coaches
- 2003: SEC Back of the Year – Touchdown Club of Atlanta Wally Butts Award
- 2003: First-team All-SEC – Associated Press
- 2003: Colonel Earl (Red) Blaik Leadership Award – All-American Football Foundation
- 2003: National Scholarship-Athlete
- 2003: Walter Camp Player of the Year Award (finalist)
- 2003: William V. Campbell Trophy (finalist)
- 2003: 3rd in Heisman Trophy balloting
- 2004: NCAA Today's Top VIII Award
- 2004: Sporting News Radio Socrates Award
- 2004: SBC Cotton Bowl Classic MVP

==== Halls of fame ====
- University of Mississippi Hall of Fame – Class of 2004
- Sigma Nu Hall of Fame – Class of 2008
- New Jersey Hall of Fame – Class of 2019
- Louisiana High School Sports Hall of Fame – Class of 2021
- M-Club Hall of Fame – Class of 2021
- Louisiana Sports Hall of Fame – Class of 2023
- Cotton Bowl Hall of Fame – Class of 2023
- Mississippi Sports Hall of Fame – Class of 2024

=== Records ===
==== NFL ====
- Tied NFL record for longest pass completion and touchdown: 99 yards (2011)
- Most passing yards in a single postseason: 1,219 yards (2011)
- Most pass completions and attempts in a single postseason: 106 completions and 163 attempts (2011)
- Most fumbles lost (career): 56
- Most consecutive completions to begin a Super Bowl: 9 (XLVI)
- Third all-time for most consecutive starts by a National Football League quarterback: 210

==== New York Giants franchise records ====
- Longest-tenured player: 16 seasons
- Most pass attempts (career): 8,119
- Most pass attempts (season): 618 (2015)
- Most pass attempts (game): 63 (December 22, 2016, against the Philadelphia Eagles)
- Most pass attempts (playoff career): 400
- Most pass attempts (playoff season): 163 (2011)
- Most pass attempts (playoff game): 58 (January 22, 2012, against the San Francisco 49ers in the NFC Championship)
- Most completions (career): 4,895
- Most completions (season): 387 (2015)
- Most completions (game): 41 (October 11, 2015, against the San Francisco 49ers in the NFC Championship)
- Most completions (playoff career): 242
- Most completions (playoff season): 106 (2011)
- Most completions (playoff game): 32 (January 22, 2012, against the San Francisco 49ers in the NFC Championship)
- Most passing yards (career): 57,023
- Most passing yards (season): 4,933 (2011)
- Most passing yards (playoff career): 2,815
- Most passing yards (playoff season): 1,219 (2011)
- Most passing touchdowns (career): 366
- Most passing touchdowns (playoff career): 18
- Most passing touchdowns (playoff season): 9 (2011)
- Most intercepted (career): 244
- Most intercepted (season): 27 (2013)
- Most sacked (playoff career): 27
- Most sacked (playoff season): 11 (2011)
- Most sacked (playoff game): 6 (January 22, 2012, against the San Francisco 49ers in the NFC Championship; tied with Phil Simms)
- Most fumbles lost (career): 56
- Longest completed pass: 99 yards (2011)
- Most fourth quarter touchdown passes, season: 15
- Most consecutive starts by a quarterback: 222 (210 regular season + 11 playoff games)
- Most 300-yard passing games: 366

== Post-playing career ==
For the 2021 NFL season, Eli and Peyton Manning joined ESPN as analysts, calling nine games during the season on an alternate broadcast called the Manningcast. The show featured segments with special guest stars from entertainment, politics, and sports, while the Manning brothers watched the game.

In addition, he currently hosts "Eli's Places" for ESPN+, where he "travel[s] to some of the most well-known and historic college football establishments and meet with giants in the sport to better understand what makes college football such a national sensation." He also received a nickname "Human Carbon Monoxide" or HCM from The Rock due to him not having a nickname unlike his brother Peyton "The Sheriff" Manning and Dwayne "The Rock" Johnson.

== Off the field ==
=== Personal life ===
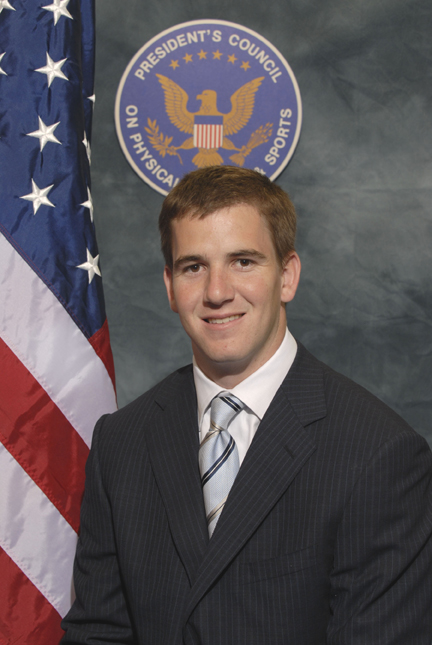
Manning in 2007

In 2007, he proposed to long-time girlfriend Abby McGrew, whom he met while attending the University of Mississippi. The couple wed in a private ceremony held in San José del Cabo, Mexico, on April 19, 2008. Together, Manning and McGrew have three daughters and a son. They reside in Summit, New Jersey.

Manning also participated in the 2026 FIFA World Cup draw on December 5, 2025.

=== Endorsements and investments ===
Manning co-starred with his brother, Peyton, in ads for NFLShop.com and Oreo. Manning is a spokesman for Citizen Watch Co., Toyota of New Jersey, and Reebok. He reportedly received several more endorsement offers after reaching Super Bowl XLII. Some of Manning's other sponsors were DIRECTV, Hublot, Nationwide Insurance, Nike, Panini, and Visa.

In August 2022, Manning joined the ownership group of the NWSL's NJ/NY Gotham FC.

=== Philanthropy and service ===
In 2005, Eli and Peyton Manning volunteered in the wake of Hurricane Katrina. They assisted in the delivery of 30,000 pounds (14,000 kg) of water, Gatorade, baby formula, pumice, and pillows to the people of New Orleans.

In 2007, after touring the University of Mississippi Medical Center's Blair E. Batson Hospital for Children, Manning undertook a five-year campaign to raise US$2.5 million for the construction of "The Eli Manning Children's Clinics" at the children's hospital. He said, "I am humbled by the work they do and am honored to make this five-year commitment to help raise funds to build this state-of-the-art clinic that will serve Mississippi families for years to come."

Since 2008, Manning has been the host of Guiding Eyes for the Blind's Golf Classic, the oldest and largest charity golf event in Westchester County, New York.

He is a former member of the President's Council on Physical Fitness and Sports.

In 2010, Manning helped raise funds for awareness of the Deepwater Horizon oil spill, in wake of the catastrophe.

In 2016, Manning was part of the 14th Annual BTIG Commissions for Charity Day, which was a fundraiser for hundreds of charities.

In 2020, Manning was named to the Board of Directors for Guiding Eyes for the Blind.

=== Television ===
On May 5, 2012, Manning hosted NBC's Saturday Night Live (season 37, episode 20), with musical guest, Rihanna.

Manning began hosting The Eli Manning Show in 2021 on the New York Giant's YouTube channel. The show has featured interviews with celebrity guests such as Derek Jeter, Tracy Morgan, Bill Murray, and Caitlin Clark.

In 2022, Manning went undercover as "Chad Powers" and participated in Penn State University football tryouts as a walk-on, which was filmed as part of an ESPN project. In that same year, he was nominated for a Sports Emmy, under the category of Outstanding Personality/Emerging On-Air Talent. In 2025, the skit was expanded into a Hulu program called Chad Powers starring Glen Powell in the title role.

=== Writing ===
In 2009, Eli, Peyton, and Archie Manning co-authored a children's book entitled, Family Huddle, which describes in simple text and pictures how the three Manning brothers played football as kids.

=== Sports memorabilia case ===
In 2014, Manning was sued in New Jersey Superior Court by sports memorabilia collectors who alleged that Manning and others conspired to sell them fraudulent memorabilia. Pretrial discovery included emails from Manning to Giants equipment manager, Joe Skiba, requesting "helmets that can pass as game-used." The suit alleged those helmets were eventually sold to the plaintiffs as game-used helmets. In May 2018, the suit was settled under confidential terms. According to lawyer and journalist, Michael McCann, Manning settled before trial in order to avoid damage to his marketability as an endorser and discipline from the NFL.

== See also ==
- Manning family
- History of the New York Giants (1994–present)
- List of 500-yard passing games in the National Football League
- List of first overall National Football League draft picks
- List of most consecutive starts by National Football League players
- List of New York Giants players
- List of New York Giants starting quarterbacks
- Manning Passing Academy – American Football training program
