= 2002 Idaho Vandals football team =

American college football season

2002 Idaho Vandals football
- Conference: Sun Belt Conference
- Record: 2–10 (1–5 SBC)
- Head coach: Tom Cable (3rd season)
- Offensive coordinator: Bret Ingalls (3rd season)
- Offensive scheme: Pro-style
- Defensive coordinator: Ed Lamb (1st season)
- Base defense: Multiple
- Home stadium: Kibbie Dome

2002 Sun Belt Conference football standings
	Conf.			Overall
Team	W		L	W		L
North Texas $	6	–	0	8	–	5
New Mexico State	5	–	1	7	–	5
Arkansas State	3	–	3	6	–	7
Middle Tennessee	2	–	4	4	–	8
Louisiana–Lafayette	2	–	4	3	–	9
Louisiana–Monroe	2	–	4	3	–	9
Idaho	1	–	5	2	–	10
$ – Conference champion

The 2002 Idaho Vandals football team represented the University of Idaho during the 2002 NCAA Division I-A football season. Idaho was a football-only member of the Sun Belt Conference, and played their home games in the Kibbie Dome, an indoor facility on campus in Moscow. The Vandals' head coach was alumnus Tom Cable, in his third season, and Idaho was 2–10 overall, 1–5 in conference.

== Schedule ==
Date	Time	Opponent	Site	TV	Result	Attendance	Source
August 31	5:00 pm	at Boise State*	Bronco Stadium; Boise, ID (rivalry)		L 21–38	30,878	
September 7	3:00 pm	at No. 11 Washington State*	Martin Stadium; Pullman, WA (Battle of the Palouse)		L 14–39	30,110	
September 14	12:30 pm	at No. 13 Oregon*	Autzen Stadium; Eugene, OR		L 21–58	55,187	
September 21	2:00 pm	San Diego State*	Kibbie Dome; Moscow, ID		W 48–38	14,887	
September 28	12:30 pm	at No. 13 Washington*	Husky Stadium; Seattle, WA	FSN	L 27–41	70,070	
October 5	12:00 pm	No. 1 (I-AA) Montana*	Kibbie Dome; Moscow, ID (Little Brown Stein)		L 31–38	14,047	
October 12	4:00 pm	at Louisiana–Monroe	Malone Stadium; Monroe, LA		L 14–34	6,509	
October 26	12:00 pm	Middle Tennessee^{†}	Kibbie Dome; Moscow, ID		W 21–18	12,434	
November 2	2:00 pm	at Louisiana–Lafayette	Cajun Field; Lafayette, LA		L 28–31	12,621	
November 9	4:00 pm	at North Texas	Fouts Field; Denton, TX		L 0–10	11,698	
November 16	2:00 pm	Arkansas State	Kibbie Dome; Moscow, ID		L 29–38	7,825	
November 23	2:00 pm	New Mexico State	Kibbie Dome; Moscow, ID		L 31–35	5,462	
*Non-conference game; ^{†}Homecoming; Rankings from AP Poll released prior to the game; All times are in Pacific time

== Roster ==
2002 Idaho Vandals football team roster
Players
Coaches
Offense

Pos.	#	Name	Class
QB	11	Brian Lindgren	Jr
WR	12	Josh Jelmberg	Jr
TB	20	Zach Gerstner	Jr
FB	44	Kevin O'Connell	Sr
FB	45	Andrew Stobart	Fr
OL	50	Jade Tadvick	Fr
C	62	Matt Martinez	Jr
G	70	Jason Cobb	Jr
G	72	Robert Mitchell	Sr
OT	74	Jake Scott	Jr
OT	77	Josh Jelinek	Sr
WR	83	Jeff Stowe	Fr
WR	86	Orlando Winston	Jr
TE	93	Kelly Nead	So

Defense

Pos.	#	Name	Class
CB	2	Ben Allen	Jr
DT	3	Brian Howard	Jr
CB	4	Ed Rankin	Sr
DT	5	Jason Jones	Jr
DT	57	Pete Foss	So
LB	7	Jordan Kramer	Sr
CB	11	Nicq Hale	Sr
LB	13	Mike Anderson	Fr
FS	22	Simeon Stewart	So
SS	33	Sergio Robleto	Sr
LB	35	Chad Kodama	Jr
LB	40	Pat Libey	Jr
DT	69	Talifaia Atoe	Sr
DE	86	Brandon Kania	So
DE	96	Dennis Taeatafa	Sr

Special teams

Pos.	#	Name	Class
P	17	Ryan Downes	Jr
PK	49	Keith Stamps	Sr

Head coach

- Tom Cable (3rd year)

Coordinators/assistant coaches

- Bret Ingalls (OC)
- Ed Lamb (DC)
- Chris Morgan (graduate assistant)

Legend

- (C) Team captain
- (S) Suspended
- (I) Ineligible
- Injured
- Redshirt

Roster
