= Glen Elarbee =

American football player and coach (born 1980)

Current position
- Title: Offensive line coach
- Team: Tennessee
- Conference: SEC

Biographical details
- Born: February 27, 1980 (age 46)

Playing career
- 1998–2002: Middle Tennessee State
- Position: Center

Coaching career (HC unless noted)
- 2003–2004: Middle Tennessee State (GA)
- 2005: Middle Tennessee State (TE)
- 2006: East Central CC (OL)
- 2007: LSU (GA)
- 2008–2009: Oklahoma State (GA)
- 2010–2011: West Georgia (OC/OL)
- 2012: Middle Tennessee State (OL)
- 2013: Houston (OL)
- 2014–2015: Arkansas State (co-OC/OL)
- 2015–2017: Missouri (OL)
- 2018–2020: UCF (AHC/OL)
- 2021–present: Tennessee (OL)

Accomplishments and honors

Awards
- 2× Second-team All-Sun Belt (2001, 2002)

Glen Elarbee (born February 27, 1980) is an American college football coach who is currently the offensive line coach at the University of Tennessee. He previously served as the assistant head coach for offense and offensive line coach at the University of Central Florida (UCF).

== Playing career ==
Elarbee played at Middle Tennessee State as a center. He played in 35 career games for the Blue Raiders from 1998 to 2002, starting his final 23 games. He was a four-year letterwinner, a two-time all-conference standout, and he helped Middle Tennessee capture its first Sun Belt title in 2001. In 2002, he received his undergraduate degree in mathematics.

== Coaching career ==
After graduating from Middle Tennessee State, Elarbee served as a graduate assistant at Middle Tennessee. In 2005, he was appointed the tight ends coach at Middle Tennessee under head coach Andy McCollum and offensive coordinator Darin Hinshaw. He had several stints at assistant roles at East Central CC, LSU, and Oklahoma State. From 2010 to 2011, he became the Offensive coordinator and offensive line coach at West Georgia. In 2012, he returned to Middle Tennessee to coach offensive line.

Elarbee was hired as offensive line coach by the University of Houston in January 2013.

Following the 2013 season, Elarbee accepted the position as co-offensive coordinator and offensive line coach at Arkansas State University

Elarbee was appointed offensive line coach at the University of Missouri on January 11, 2016, working under head coach Barry Odom and alongside offensive coordinator Josh Heupel

On December 5, 2017, Heupel was appointed head coach of the UCF Knights football team. Elarbee was the first to join Heupel's staff to be the offensive line coach hired on December 8. Before the 2018 season began, Heupel named Elarbee the assistant head coach for offense after Heupel decided to play-call rather than hiring a formal offensive coordinator.

Elarbee was hired at University of Tennessee as their offensive line coach following head coach Josh Heupel from UCF.
