= Mike Collins (American football) =

American football player and coach (born 1960)

Current position
- Title: Head Coach
- Team: Neville HS (LA)
- Conference: LHSAA
- Record: 19-7

Biographical details
- Born: December 13, 1960 (age 65); Monroe, Louisiana, U.S.

Playing career
- 1979–1982: Northeast Louisiana
- Position: Center

Coaching career (HC unless noted)
- 1983–1984: Northeast Louisiana (GA)
- 1985–1990: Ouachita HS (Monroe, La) (DC)
- 1991–1997: McNeese State (LB)
- 1998: Northeast Louisiana (LB)
- 1999–2002: Louisiana–Monroe (DC)
- 2002: Louisiana–Monroe (interim HC)
- 2003-2004: LSU (LB)
- 2005–2006: Northwestern State (AHC/DC)
- 2007: Kilgore HS (TX) (LB)
- 2008: McNeese State (LB)
- 2009–2010: McNeese State (AHC/DB)
- 2011–2012: McNeese State (AHC/DC/DB)
- 2013–2015: Sam Houston St. (AHC/DC/LB)
- 2016–2019: Louisiana–Monroe (AHC/DC/LB)
- 2021–2023: Neville HS (LA) (DC)
- 2024-present: Neville HS (LA)

Administrative career (AD unless noted)
- 2021-2024: Neville High School (Deputy AD)
- 2024-present: Neville High School

Head coaching record
- Overall: 3–6 (College); 19-7 (High School)

Accomplishments and honors

Championships
- BCS national champion (2003)

Mike Collins (born December 13, 1960) is an American football coach and former player. He was the defensive coordinator at University of Louisiana at Monroe until unexpectedly stepping down on September 3, 2020, just 10 days prior to ULM's first game of the season. He has formerly coached two different stints as defensive coordinator and linebackers coach at McNeese State University. Collins was named interim head football coach at Louisiana–Monroe during the 2002 season.

ULM announced that Collins would be the permanent hire for head coach at the end of the 2002 season, but four months into his tenure he resigned after an April 2003 arrest on suspicion of driving while intoxicated. He later fought the charge and won in court.

On May 15, 2013, Sam Houston State announced Mike Collins would replace Scott Stoker as Sam Houston's defensive coordinator.

On December 20, 2015, new Louisiana–Monroe coach Matt Viator announced that Collins would be returning to the Warhawks' staff as defensive coordinator.

== Head coaching record ==
Year	Team	Overall	Conference	Standing	Bowl/playoffs
Louisiana–Monroe Indians (Note: Collins served as interim head coach after Bobby Keasler was fired during the season.) (Sun Belt Conference) (2002)
2002	Louisiana–Monroe	3–6	2–4	T–4th	
Louisiana–Monroe:		3–6	2–4		
Total:		3–6			
