= 2002 New Mexico State Aggies football team =

American college football season

2002 New Mexico State Aggies football
- Conference: Sun Belt Conference
- Record: 7–5 (5–1 Sun Belt)
- Head coach: Tony Samuel (6th season)
- Offensive coordinator: Barney Cotton (6th season)
- Offensive scheme: Option
- Defensive coordinator: Steve Stanard (3rd season)
- Base defense: 4–3
- Home stadium: Aggie Memorial Stadium

2002 Sun Belt Conference football standings
	Conf.			Overall
Team	W		L	W		L
North Texas $	6	–	0	8	–	5
New Mexico State	5	–	1	7	–	5
Arkansas State	3	–	3	6	–	7
Middle Tennessee	2	–	4	4	–	8
Louisiana–Lafayette	2	–	4	3	–	9
Louisiana–Monroe	2	–	4	3	–	9
Idaho	1	–	5	2	–	10
$ – Conference champion

The 2002 New Mexico State Aggies football team represented New Mexico State University in the 2002 NCAA Division I-A football season. The Aggies were coached by head coach Tony Samuel and played their home games at Aggie Memorial Stadium in Las Cruces, New Mexico. They participated as members of the Sun Belt Conference. Their 7 wins were the most wins for New Mexico State since 1970. Until the 2017 season, this was the last Aggies team to finish with a winning record. Despite finishing 7–5, they were not invited to a bowl game.

== Schedule ==
Date	Time	Opponent	Site	Result	Attendance	Source
August 31	5:00 pm	at No. 22 South Carolina*	Williams–Brice Stadium; Columbia, SC	L 24–34	83,717	
September 7	4:30 pm	at California*	California Memorial Stadium; Berkeley, CA	L 13–34	24,692	
September 21	6:00 pm	New Mexico*	Aggie Memorial Stadium; Las Cruces, NM (Rio Grande Rivalry)	W 24–13	28,587	
September 28	3:00 pm	at No. 7 Georgia*	Sanford Stadium; Athens, GA	L 10–41	86,520	
October 5	6:05 pm	UTEP*	Aggie Memorial Stadium; Las Cruces, NM (Battle of I-10)	W 49–14	30,605	
October 12	6:05 pm	Louisiana–Lafayette^{†}	Aggie Memorial Stadium; Las Cruces, NM	W 31–28	19,876	
October 19	2:05 pm	Louisiana–Monroe	Aggie Memorial Stadium; Las Cruces, NM	W 34–21	12,183	
October 26	5:00 pm	at Arkansas State	Indian Stadium; Jonesboro, AR	W 26–21	11,036	
November 2	4:00 pm	Middle Tennessee	Aggie Memorial Stadium; Las Cruces, NM	W 24–21	19,562	
November 9	1:00 pm	at Utah State*	Romney Stadium; Logan, UT	L 30–32	12,291	
November 16	2:00 pm	at North Texas	Fouts Field; Denton, TX	L 27–38	20,064	
November 23	3:00 pm	at Idaho	Kibbie Dome; Moscow, ID	W 35–31	5,462	
*Non-conference game; ^{†}Homecoming; Rankings from AP Poll released prior to the game; All times are in Mountain time

== Roster ==
2002 New Mexico State Aggies football team roster
Players
Coaches
Offense

Pos.	#	Name	Class
RB	4	Eric Higgins	Jr
RB	6	Keith Mouton	Fr
WR	7	H. B. Briscoe	Sr
WR	8	Chris Lumpkin	Jr
QB	10	Paul Drombowski	Fr
QB	11	Buck Pierce	So
QB	13	Carl Scaffidi	So
WR	14	Preston Williams	So
QB	17	Doug Brady	Sr
WR	19	P. J. Winston	Sr
RB	22	Walter Taylor	Sr
RB	23	Tony Bostic	Jr
WR	27	Ronshay Jenkins	Jr
FB	36	Kermit Okamura	Sr
FB	38	Rambo Fiaseu	Fr
FB	44	Marcus Dixon	Jr
C	68	B. J. Van Briesen	Sr
G	72	Adam Sinclair	So
G	75	Shalimar Jackson	Sr
G	77	Justin Shopbell	So
WR	81	Chris Duncan	Jr
TE	85	Travis Samuel	Fr
TE	89	Alex Davis	Jr
TE	97	Dustin Ditmore	Jr

Defense

Pos.	#	Name	Class
CB	3	Robert Canidate	Sr
S	9	Shukree Shabazz	Fr
S	28	Siddeeq Shabazz	Sr
S	31	Tyrone Gifford	Sr
LB	34	Julmar Howard	Jr
LB	37	Richard Glover	So
LB	42	Jim Cottrell	Fr
DE	95	Lamar Hill	Jr
DE	54	John Sioui	Jr

Special teams

Pos.	#	Name	Class
K	12	Dario Aguiniga	Jr
P	16	Brian Copple	Sr

Head coach

- Tony Samuel

Coordinators/assistant coaches

- Ross Els (Special Team Coordinator/safeties)
- Mark Mauer (Wide receivers)
- Steve Stanard (Defensive coordinator/linebacker)

Legend

- (C) Team captain
- (S) Suspended
- (I) Ineligible
- Injured
- Redshirt

Roster
Last update: September 2, 2014
