= 2002 Middle Tennessee Blue Raiders football team =

American college football season

2002 Middle Tennessee Blue Raiders football
- Conference: Sun Belt Conference
- Record: 4–8 (2–4 Sun Belt)
- Head coach: Andy McCollum (4th season)
- Offensive coordinator: Steve Campbell (1st season)
- Co-offensive coordinator: Blake Anderson (1st season)
- Defensive coordinator: Steve Davis (2nd season)
- Home stadium: Johnny "Red" Floyd Stadium

2002 Sun Belt Conference football standings
	Conf.			Overall
Team	W		L	W		L
North Texas $	6	–	0	8	–	5
New Mexico State	5	–	1	7	–	5
Arkansas State	3	–	3	6	–	7
Middle Tennessee	2	–	4	4	–	8
Louisiana–Lafayette	2	–	4	3	–	9
Louisiana–Monroe	2	–	4	3	–	9
Idaho	1	–	5	2	–	10
$ – Conference champion

The 2002 Middle Tennessee Blue Raiders football team represented Middle Tennessee State University as a member of the Sun Belt Conference during the 2002 NCAA Division I-A football season. Led by fourth-year head coach Andy McCollum, the Blue Raiders compiled an overall record of 4–8 with a mark of 2–4 in conference play, placing in a three-way tie for fourth place in the Sun Belt. Over the course of the season, the Middle Tennessee was outscored by its opponents by a total of 332 to 297.

== Schedule ==
Date	Time	Opponent	Site	Result	Attendance
August 31	11:30 am	at Alabama*	Legion Field; Birmingham, AL	L 34–39	80,091
September 7	6:00 pm	at No. 4 Tennessee*	Neyland Stadium; Knoxville, TN	L 3–26	107,672
September 21	12:30 pm	at Kentucky*	Commonwealth Stadium; Lexington, KY	L 22–44	60,584
September 28	7:00 pm	Southeast Missouri State*	Johnny "Red" Floyd Stadium; Murfreesboro, TN	L 14–24	27,519
October 5	4:00 pm	at Arkansas State	Indian Stadium; Jonesboro, AR	L 7–13	16,191
October 12	6:00 pm	at Vanderbilt*	Vanderbilt Stadium; Nashville, TN	W 21–20	28,660
October 19	11:00 am	Louisiana–Lafayette	Johnny "Red" Floyd Stadium; Murfreesboro, TN	W 48–35	9,726
October 26	2:00 pm	at Idaho	Kibbie Dome; Moscow, ID	L 18–21	12,434
November 2	6:00 pm	at New Mexico State	Aggie Memorial Stadium; Las Cruces, NM	L 21–24	19,562
November 16	2:30 pm	Louisiana–Monroe	Johnny "Red" Floyd Stadium; Murfreesboro, TN	W 44–28	8,326
November 23	2:30 pm	North Texas	Johnny "Red" Floyd Stadium; Murfreesboro, TN	L 20–30	6,827
November 30	2:00 pm	Utah State	Johnny "Red" Floyd Stadium; Murfreesboro, TN	W 45–28	3,418
*Non-conference game; Rankings from AP Poll released prior to the game; All times are in Central time

== Game summaries ==
=== At Alabama ===
	1	2	3	4	Total
Blue Raiders	0	11	3	20	34
Crimson Tide	22	0	7	10	39

=== At No. 4 Tennessee ===
	1	2	3	4	Total
Blue Raiders	0	0	0	3	3
No. 4 Volunteers	14	3	0	9	26

=== At Kentucky ===
	1	2	3	4	Total
Blue Raiders	0	16	6	0	22
Wildcats	17	7	13	7	44

=== Southeast Missouri State ===
	1	2	3	4	Total
Indians	7	3	0	14	24
Blue Raiders	7	0	7	0	14

=== At Arkansas State ===
	1	2	3	4	Total
Blue Raiders	0	7	0	0	7
Indians	6	7	0	0	13

=== At Vanderbilt ===
	1	2	3	4	Total
Blue Raiders	7	7	0	7	21
Commodores	3	0	7	10	20

=== Louisiana–Lafayette ===
	1	2	3	4	Total
Ragin' Cajuns	2	13	7	13	35
Blue Raiders	14	3	21	10	48

=== At Idaho ===
	1	2	3	4	Total
Blue Raiders	0	10	0	8	18
Vandals	7	0	14	0	21

=== At New Mexico State ===
	1	2	3	4	Total
Blue Raiders	0	0	14	7	21
Aggies	0	10	0	14	24

=== Louisiana–Monroe ===
	1	2	3	4	Total
Indians	0	14	7	7	28
Blue Raiders	24	7	10	3	44

=== North Texas ===
	1	2	3	4	Total
Mean Green	6	9	8	7	30
Blue Raiders	7	7	0	6	20

=== Utah State ===
	1	2	3	4	Total
Aggies	0	14	0	14	28
Blue Raiders	14	3	14	14	45

== After the season ==
=== NFL draft ===
The following Blue Raider was selected in the 2003 NFL draft following the season.

Round	Pick	Player	Position	NFL club
2	60	Tyrone Calico	Wide receiver	Tennessee Titans
