= 2002 North Texas Mean Green football team =

American college football season

2002 North Texas Mean Green football

Sun Belt champion New Orleans Bowl champion

New Orleans Bowl, W 24–19 vs. Cincinnati
- Conference: Sun Belt Conference
- Record: 8–5 (6–0 Sun Belt)
- Head coach: Darrell Dickey (5th season)
- Offensive coordinator: Ramon Flanigan (1st season)
- Offensive scheme: Pro spread
- Defensive coordinator: Gary DeLoach (3rd season)
- Base defense: 4–3
- Home stadium: Fouts Field

2002 Sun Belt Conference football standings
| | Conf. | | | Overall |
| Team | W | | L | W | | L |
|---|---|---|---|---|---|---|
| North Texas $ | 6 | – | 0 | 8 | – | 5 |
| New Mexico State | 5 | – | 1 | 7 | – | 5 |
| Arkansas State | 3 | – | 3 | 6 | – | 7 |
| Middle Tennessee | 2 | – | 4 | 4 | – | 8 |
| Louisiana–Lafayette | 2 | – | 4 | 3 | – | 9 |
| Louisiana–Monroe | 2 | – | 4 | 3 | – | 9 |
| Idaho | 1 | – | 5 | 2 | – | 10 |
$ – Conference champion

The 2002 North Texas Mean Green football team represented the University of North Texas as a member of the Sun Belt Conference during the 2002 NCAA Division I-A football season. Led by fifth-year head coach Darrell Dickey, the Mean Green compiled an overall record of 8–5 with a mark 6–0 in conference play, winning the Sun Belt title. North Texas was invited to the New Orleans Bowl, where the Mean Green defeated Cincinnati. The team played home games at the Fouts Field in Denton, Texas.

== Schedule ==
| Date | Time | Opponent | Site | TV | Result | Attendance | Source |
|---|---|---|---|---|---|---|---|
| August 31 | 7:00 pm | at No. 3 Texas* | Darrell K Royal–Texas Memorial Stadium; Austin, TX | | L 0–27 | 83,051 | |
| September 7 | 7:05 pm | Nicholls State* | Fouts Field; Denton, TX | | W 23–0 | 12,816 | |
| September 14 | 6:00 pm | at Alabama* | Bryant–Denny Stadium; Tuscaloosa, AL | | L 7–33 | 79,818 | |
| September 21 | 6:00 pm | at TCU* | Amon G. Carter Stadium; Fort Worth, TX | | L 10–16 | 33,281 | |
| September 28 | 8:00 pm | at Arizona* | Arizona Stadium; Tucson, AZ | | L 9–14 | 37,917 | |
| October 5 | 7:05 pm | South Florida* | Fouts Field; Denton, TX | | L 17–24 | 15,512 | |
| October 19 | 6:00 pm | at Arkansas State | Indian Stadium; Jonesboro, AR | | W 13–10 | 12,671 | |
| October 26 | 4:00 pm | at Louisiana–Lafayette | Cajun Field; Lafayette, LA | | W 27–0 | 8,413 | |
| November 2 | 4:05 pm | Louisiana–Monroe^{†} | Fouts Field; Denton, TX | | W 41–2 | 16,212 | |
| November 9 | 6:05 pm | Idaho | Fouts Field; Denton, TX | | W 10–0 | 11,698 | |
| November 16 | 3:05 pm | New Mexico State | Fouts Field; Denton, TX | | W 38–27 | 20,064 | |
| November 23 | 2:30 pm | Middle Tennessee | Johnny "Red" Floyd Stadium; Murfreesboro, TN | | W 30–20 | 6,827 | |
| December 17 | 6:00 pm | vs. Cincinnati* | Louisiana Superdome; New Orleans, LA (New Orleans Bowl) | ESPN2 | W 24–19 | 19,024 | |
*Non-conference game; ^{†}Homecoming; Rankings from AP Poll released prior to the game; All times are in Central time
