= 2002 Louisiana–Lafayette Ragin' Cajuns football team =

American college football season

2002 Louisiana–Lafayette Ragin' Cajuns football
- Conference: Sun Belt Conference
- Record: 3–9 (2–4 Sun Belt)
- Head coach: Rickey Bustle (1st season)
- Offensive coordinator: Rob Christophel (1st season)
- Defensive coordinator: Brent Pry (1st season)
- Home stadium: Cajun Field

2002 Sun Belt Conference football standings
	Conf.			Overall
Team	W		L	W		L
North Texas $	6	–	0	8	–	5
New Mexico State	5	–	1	7	–	5
Arkansas State	3	–	3	6	–	7
Middle Tennessee	2	–	4	4	–	8
Louisiana–Lafayette	2	–	4	3	–	9
Louisiana–Monroe	2	–	4	3	–	9
Idaho	1	–	5	2	–	10
$ – Conference champion

The 2002 Louisiana–Lafayette Ragin' Cajuns football team represented the University of Louisiana at Lafayette as a member of the Sun Belt Conference in the 2002 NCAA Division I-A football season. They were led by first-year head coach Rickey Bustle played their home games at Cajun Field in Lafayette, Louisiana.

== Schedule ==
Date	Time	Opponent	Site	Result	Attendance	Source
August 31	6:00 p.m.	at No. 23 Texas A&M*	Kyle Field; College Station, TX	L 7–31	75,087	
September 7	7:00 p.m.	Minnesota*	Cajun Field; Lafayette, LA	L 11–35	20,512	
September 14	7:00 p.m.	at Houston*	Robertson Stadium; Houston, TX	L 17–36	19,569	
September 21	6:00 p.m.	UAB*	Cajun Field; Lafayette, LA	W 34–0	19,616	
October 5	7:00 p.m.	at No. 21 LSU*	Tiger Stadium; Baton Rouge, LA	L 0–48	91,357	
October 12	7:05 p.m.	at New Mexico State	Aggie Memorial Stadium; Las Cruces, NM	L 28–31	19,876	
October 19	11:00 a.m.	at Middle Tennessee	Johnny "Red" Floyd Stadium; Murfreesboro, TN	L 35–48	9,726	
October 26	4:00 p.m.	North Texas	Cajun Field; Lafayette, LA	L 0–27	8,413	
November 2	4:00 p.m.	Idaho	Cajun Field; Lafayette, LA	W 31–28	12,621	
November 9	4:00 p.m.	Arkansas State	Cajun Field; Lafayette, LA	W 13–10	14,117	
November 16	1:00 p.m.	at Arkansas*	Donald W. Reynolds Razorback Stadium; Fayetteville, AR	L 17–24	54,843	
November 23	4:00 p.m.	at Louisiana–Monroe	Malone Stadium; Monroe, LA (Battle on the Bayou)	L 10–34	7,012	
*Non-conference game; Rankings from AP Poll released prior to the game; All times are in Central time
