= 2002 New Orleans Bowl =

Cincinnati Bearcats	North Texas Mean Green
(7–6)	(7–5)
C-USA	Sun Belt
19	24
Head coach: Rick Minter	Head coach: Darrell Dickey
	1	2	3	4	Total
Cincinnati	7	0	6	6	19
North Texas	3	14	7	0	24
- Date: December 17, 2002
- Season: 2002
- Stadium: Louisiana Superdome
- Location: New Orleans, Louisiana
- MVP: North Texas RB Kevin Galbreath
- Favorite: Cincinnati by 7.5
- Referee: Jim Knight (ACC)
- Attendance: 19,024
- Payout: US$750,000 per team

United States TV coverage
- Network: ESPN2
- Announcers: Pam Ward, Chris Spielman, Rob Stone

The 2002 New Orleans Bowl featured the Cincinnati Bearcats and the North Texas Mean Green. It was North Texas' second consecutive New Orleans Bowl appearance.

Quarterback Gino Guidugli got Cincinnati on the board first with a 6-yard touchdown pass to wide receiver Tye Keith, to give Cincinnati a 7–0 lead. Nick Bazaldua connected on a 30-yard field goal before the end of the first quarter to make the score 7–3. In the second quarter, running back Patrick Cobbs scored on a 27-yard touchdown run, to give North Texas a 10–7 lead. Cornerback Jeremy Pearl intercepted a Cincinnati pass and returned it 20 yards for a touchdown, to increase the lead to 17–7.

In the third quarter, Kevin Galbreath scored on a 35-yard touchdown run to increase the lead to 24–7. Johnathan Ruffin connected on two third-quarter field goals to cut the deficit to 24–13. Franklin Calicott returned a fumble 43 yards for a touchdown with five minutes left to cut the lead to 24–19. That was the final score of the game.
