= 2002 Louisiana–Monroe Indians football team =

American college football season

2002 Louisiana–Monroe Indians football
- Conference: Sun Belt Conference
- Record: 3–9 (2–4 Sun Belt)
- Head coach: Bobby Keasler (4th season; first 3 games); Mike Collins (interim, final 9 games)
- Offensive coordinator: Tommy Condell (1st season)
- Defensive coordinator: Mike Collins (4th season)
- Home stadium: Malone Stadium

2002 Sun Belt Conference football standings
| | Conf. | | | Overall |
| Team | W | | L | W | | L |
|---|---|---|---|---|---|---|
| North Texas $ | 6 | – | 0 | 8 | – | 5 |
| New Mexico State | 5 | – | 1 | 7 | – | 5 |
| Arkansas State | 3 | – | 3 | 6 | – | 7 |
| Middle Tennessee | 2 | – | 4 | 4 | – | 8 |
| Louisiana–Lafayette | 2 | – | 4 | 3 | – | 9 |
| Louisiana–Monroe | 2 | – | 4 | 3 | – | 9 |
| Idaho | 1 | – | 5 | 2 | – | 10 |
$ – Conference champion

The 2002 Louisiana–Monroe Indians football team represented the University of Louisiana at Monroe as a member of the Sun Belt Conference during the 2002 NCAA Division I-A football season. The Indians began the season led by fourth-year Bobby Keasler, who resigned after the team lost its first three games. Louisiana–Monroe's defensive coordinator, Mike Collins, was appointed interim head coach for the remainder of the season. The Indians finished the year with an overall record of 3–9 and mark of 2–4 in conference play, placing in athree-way tie for fourth in the Sun Belt. Louisiana–Monroe's offense scored 236 points while the defense allowed 451 points. The team played home games at Malone Stadium in Monroe, Louisiana.

== Schedule ==
| Date | Time | Opponent | Site | TV | Result | Attendance | Source |
|---|---|---|---|---|---|---|---|
| August 31 | 6:00 pm | at Ole Miss* | Vaught–Hemingway Stadium; Oxford, MS | | L 3–31 | 58,151 | |
| September 7 | 6:10 pm | at Kansas State* | KSU Stadium; Manhattan, KS | | L 0–68 | 43,104 | |
| September 14 | 6:00 pm | No. 3 (I-AA) McNeese State* | Malone Stadium; Monroe, LA | | L 19–24 | 10,091 | |
| September 21 | 6:00 pm | Arkansas State | Malone Stadium; Monroe, LA | | L 21–33 | 9,375 | |
| October 5 | 6:00 pm | Tulane* | Malone Stadium; Monroe, LA | | L 9–52 | 11,645 | |
| October 12 | 6:00 pm | Idaho | Malone Stadium; Monroe, LA | | W 34–14 | 6,509 | |
| October 19 | 3:05 pm | at New Mexico State | Aggie Memorial Stadium; Las Cruces, NM | | L 21–34 | 12,183 | |
| October 26 | 6:00 pm | Utah State | Malone Stadium; Monroe, LA | | W 51–48 ^{2OT} | 6,190 | |
| November 2 | 3:05 pm | at North Texas | Fouts Field; Denton, TX | | L 2–41 | 16,212 | |
| November 9 | 1:00 pm | at Auburn* | Jordan–Hare Stadium; Auburn, AL | PPV | L 14–52 | 84,618 | |
| November 16 | 2:30 pm | at Middle Tennessee | Johnny "Red" Floyd Stadium; Murfreesboro, TN | ESPN+ | L 28–44 | 8,326 | |
| November 23 | 4:00 pm | Louisiana–Lafayette | Malone Stadium; Monroe, LA (Battle on the Bayou) | | W 34–10 | 7,012 | |
*Non-conference game; Rankings from The Sports Network Poll released prior to the game; All times are in Central time

== Roster ==
2002 Louisiana–Monroe Indians football team roster
Players
Coaches
Offense

| Pos. | # | Name | Class |
|---|---|---|---|
| QB | 9 | Kjell Nesen | Jr |
| QB | 10 | Daniel Da Prato | Jr |

Defense

| Pos. | # | Name | Class |
|---|---|---|---|
| FS | 5 | Chris Harris | So |
| DE | 89 | Marbrae Wilson | So |

Special teams

| Pos. | # | Name | Class |

Head coach

- Bobby Keasler

Coordinators/assistant coaches

Legend

- (C) Team captain
- (S) Suspended
- (I) Ineligible
- Injured
- Redshirt

Roster
Last update: 2002-11-08
