= Bobby Keasler =

American football coach (1945–2026)

Biographical details
- Born: September 8, 1945; New Iberia, Louisiana, U.S.
- Died: May 12, 2026 (aged 80)

Coaching career (HC unless noted)
- 1979–1980: New Iberia HS (LA)
- 1981–1989: Northeast Louisiana (assistant)
- 1990–1998: McNeese State
- 1999–2002: Louisiana–Monroe

Administrative career (AD unless noted)
- 1996: McNeese State

Head coaching record
- Overall: 86–62–2 (college)
- Tournaments: 8–7 (NCAA D-I-AA playoffs)

Accomplishments and honors

Championships
- 4 Southland (1991, 1993, 1995, 1997)

Awards
- 5× Southland Coach of the Year (1990–1991, 1993, 1995, 1997)

Bobby Earl Keasler (September 8, 1945 – May 12, 2026) was an American football coach. He served as the head football coach at McNeese State University from 1990 to 1998 and at the University of Louisiana at Monroe from 1999 until 2002, compiling a career college football record of 86–62–2.

Keasler died on May 12, 2026, at the age of 80.

== Head coaching record ==
=== College ===
Year	Team	Overall	Conference	Standing	Bowl/playoffs	TSN^{#}	Coaches^{°}
McNeese State Cowboys (Southland Conference) (1990–1998)
1990	McNeese State	5–6	4–2	2nd			
1991	McNeese State	6–4–2	4–1–2	1st	L NCAA Division I-AA First Round		
1992	McNeese State	9–4	6–1	2nd	L NCAA Division I-AA Quarterfinal		
1993	McNeese State	10–3	7–0	1st	L NCAA Division I-AA Quarterfinal	5	
1994	McNeese State	10–3	5–1	2nd	L NCAA Division I-AA Quarterfinal	5	
1995	McNeese State	13–1	5–0	1st	L NCAA Division I-AA Semifinal	1	
1996	McNeese State	3–8	1–5	7th			
1997	McNeese State	13–2	6–1	T–1st	L NCAA Division I-AA Championship	6	2
1998	McNeese State	9–3	5–2	T–2nd	L NCAA Division I-AA First Round	6	8
McNeese State:		78–34–2	43–13–2				
Louisiana–Monroe Indians (NCAA Division I-A independent) (1999–2000)
1999	Louisiana–Monroe	5–6					
2000	Louisiana–Monroe	1–10					
Louisiana–Monroe Indians (Sun Belt Conference) (2001–2002)
2001	Louisiana–Monroe	2–9	2–4	T–4th			
2002	Louisiana–Monroe	0–3 (Note: Keasler resigned after the first three games of the 2002 season, before the start of conference play. Mike Collins replaced Keasler as interim head coach and led Louisiana–Monroe to a record of 3–6 over the final nine games of the season. The Indians finished 3–9 overall and 2–4 in Sun Belt Conference play, tying for fourth place.)	0–0				
Louisiana–Monroe:		8–28	2–4				
Total:		86–62–2					
National championship Conference title Conference division title or championship game berth
