= 2002 Arkansas State Indians football team =

American college football season

2002 Arkansas State Indians football
- Conference: Sun Belt Conference
- Record: 6–7 (3–3 Sun Belt)
- Head coach: Steve Roberts (1st season)
- Offensive coordinator: Doug Ruse (1st season)
- Co-defensive coordinators: Kevin Corless (1st season); Jack Curtis (1st season)
- Home stadium: Indian Stadium

2002 Sun Belt Conference football standings
	Conf.			Overall
Team	W		L	W		L
North Texas $	6	–	0	8	–	5
New Mexico State	5	–	1	7	–	5
Arkansas State	3	–	3	6	–	7
Middle Tennessee	2	–	4	4	–	8
Louisiana–Lafayette	2	–	4	3	–	9
Louisiana–Monroe	2	–	4	3	–	9
Idaho	1	–	5	2	–	10
$ – Conference champion

The 2002 Arkansas State Indians football team represented Arkansas State University as a member of the Sun Belt Conference the 2002 NCAA Division I-A football season. Led by first-year head coach Steve Roberts, the Indians compiled an overall record of 6–7 with a mark of 3–3 in conference play, placing third in the Sun Belt.

== Schedule ==
Date	Time	Opponent	Site	TV	Result	Attendance
August 25	2:30 p.m.	at No. 16 Virginia Tech*	Lane Stadium; Blacksburg, VA (Hispanic College Fund Football Classic)	ESPN Plus	L 7–63	54,016
August 31	6:00 p.m.	San Jose State*	War Memorial Stadium; Little Rock, AR		L 14–33	18,492
September 7	6:00 p.m.	Tulsa*	Indian Stadium; Jonesboro, AR		W 21–19	15,363
September 14	11:00 a.m.	at Illinois*	Memorial Stadium; Champaign, IL	ESPN Plus	L 7–59	46,258
September 21	6:00 p.m.	at Louisiana–Monroe	Malone Stadium; Monroe, LA		W 33–21	9,375
September 28	6:00 p.m.	Tennessee–Martin*	Indian Stadium; Jonesboro, AR		W 30–10	14,826
October 5	4:00 p.m.	Middle Tennessee	Indian Stadium; Jonesboro, AR		W 13–7	16,191
October 12	1:00 p.m.	at No. 25 Ole Miss*	Vaught–Hemingway Stadium; Oxford, MS		L 17–52	55,204
October 19	6:00 p.m.	North Texas^{†}	Indian Stadium; Jonesboro, AR		L 10–13	12,671
October 26	5:00 p.m.	New Mexico State	Indian Stadium; Jonesboro, AR		L 21–26	11,036
November 2	2:00 p.m.	Southern Utah*	Indian Stadium; Jonesboro, AR		W 38–16	9,107
November 9	4:00 p.m.	at Louisiana–Lafayette	Cajun Field; Lafayette, LA		L 10–13	14,117
November 16	4:00 p.m.	at Idaho	Kibbie Dome; Moscow, ID		W 38–29	7,825
*Non-conference game; ^{†}Homecoming; Rankings from AP Poll released prior to the game; All times are in Central time
