= Brian Lindgren =

American football player and coach (born 1980)

Current position
- Title: Pass game coordinator & quarterbacks coach
- Team: Stanford
- Conference: ACC

Biographical details
- Born: August 6, 1980 (age 46); Walla Walla, Washington, U.S.

Playing career
- 2001–2003: Idaho
- Position: Quarterback

Coaching career (HC unless noted)
- 2005: Redlands (QB)
- 2006: Northern Arizona (WR)
- 2007: Northern Arizona (RB)
- 2008: Northern Arizona (PGC/QB)
- 2009–2011: Northern Arizona (OC/QB)
- 2012: San Jose State (OC/QB)
- 2013–2015: Colorado (OC/QB)
- 2016–2017: Colorado (co-OC/QB)
- 2018–2023: Oregon State (OC/QB)
- 2024–2025: Michigan State (OC/QB)
- 2026–present: Stanford (PGC/QB)

Accomplishments and honors

Awards
- First-team All-Sun Belt (2002)

Brian Lindgren (born August 6, 1980) is an American football coach who currently serves as the Quarterbacks coach / Pass Game Coordinator at Stanford University. He was previously the offensive coordinator at Michigan State, Oregon State, Colorado, San Jose State, and Northern Arizona.

== Playing career ==
Born and raised in Walla Walla, Washington, Lindgren played quarterback at Desales Catholic High School and the University of Idaho in Moscow, where he was a three-year starter under head coach Tom Cable. Lindgren threw for 6,451 yards and 44 touchdowns for the Vandals in those three seasons (2001–03), including a 637-yard passing game at Middle Tennessee in 2001, a performance that set a FBS single-game record for a sophomore.

== Coaching career ==
After his playing career ended, Lindgren worked at the University of Redlands as the football team's quarterbacks coach in 2005. He joined the coaching staff at Northern Arizona in 2006 as a receivers coach, working his way up to offensive coordinator in 2009. He left Northern Arizona to accept the offensive coordinator position at San Jose State in 2012. He was a finalist for the head coaching job at his alma mater Idaho in 2012, but the job ultimately went to Paul Petrino.

=== Colorado ===
After San Jose State head coach Mike MacIntyre was named the new head coach at Colorado, Lindgren joined him as his offensive coordinator, the same position he held under him at San Jose State. He was shifted to co-offensive coordinator in 2016 following the hire of Darrin Chiaverini, sharing coordinator duties with Chiaverini.

=== Oregon State ===
Lindgren was hired to be the offensive coordinator and quarterbacks coach at Oregon State in 2018 under new head coach Jonathan Smith. It was reported in December 2019 that Lindgren was offered the offensive coordinator position at Arizona State, but he turned down the offer.
