= Rickey Bustle =

American football player and coach (born 1953)

Current position
- Title: Head coach
- Team: Athens Christian (GA)

Biographical details
- Born: August 23, 1953 (age 73); Summerville, South Carolina, U.S.

Playing career
- 1974–1976: Clemson
- Position: Wide receiver

Coaching career (HC unless noted)
- 1979: Gardner–Webb (DC)
- 1980–1982: East Carolina (WR)
- 1983: Arizona Wranglers (RB)
- 1984–1985: Northeast Louisiana (RB)
- 1986: Northeast Louisiana (OC)
- 1987–1992: Virginia Tech (QB/WR)
- 1993: Virginia Tech (OC/QB)
- 1994: South Carolina (OC/QB)
- 1995–2001: Virginia Tech (OC/QB)
- 2002–2010: Louisiana–Lafayette
- 2011: Tulane (QB)
- 2012: Southern Miss (RB)
- 2013–2014: North Carolina A&T (OC/QB)
- 2015–2017: Prince Avenue Christian (GA) (OC)
- 2018: East Jackson HS (GA) (QB)
- 2019–2020: Clarke Central HS (GA) (QB)
- 2021–present: Athens Christian (GA)

Head coaching record
- Overall: 43–65 (college)

Accomplishments and honors

Championships
- 1 Sun Belt (2005)

Rickey Norman Bustle (born August 23, 1953) is an American football coach and former player. He is the Head football coach at Athens Christian School in Athens, Georgia, a position he had held since 2021. Bustle served as the head football coach at the University of Louisiana at Lafayette from 2002 to 2010, compiling a record of 41–65. As a player Bustle was a three-year football letterman at Clemson University. Before going to Louisiana, Bustle was an assistant coach (offensive coordinator and quarterbacks coach) at Virginia Tech. Bustle's salary at Louisiana in 2009 was $226,000.

== Head coaching record ==
=== College ===
Year	Team	Overall	Conference	Standing	Bowl/playoffs
Louisiana–Lafayette Ragin' Cajuns (Sun Belt Conference) (2002–2010)
2002	Louisiana–Lafayette	3–9	2–4	T–4th	
2003	Louisiana–Lafayette	4–8	3–2	2nd	
2004	Louisiana–Lafayette	4–7	2–5	T–7th	
2005	Louisiana–Lafayette	6–5	5–2	T–1st	
2006	Louisiana–Lafayette	6–6	3–4	T–5th	
2007	Louisiana–Lafayette	3–9	3–4	T–5th	
2008	Louisiana–Lafayette	6–6	5–2	2nd	
2009	Louisiana–Lafayette	6–6	4–4	5th	
2010	Louisiana–Lafayette	3–9	3–5	T–6th	
Louisiana–Lafayette:		41–65	30–32		
Total:		41–65			
National championship Conference title Conference division title or championship game berth
