= Andy McCollum (American football coach) =

American football player and coach (born 1959)

Biographical details
- Born: March 1, 1959 (age 67)

Playing career
- 1977–1980: Austin Peay State
- Positions: Offensive guard, tight end

Coaching career (HC unless noted)
- 1981–1988: Middle Tennessee (assistant)
- 1989–1993: UTEP (assistant)
- 1994: Baylor (LB)
- 1995–1996: Baylor (AHC/DC/LB)
- 1997–1998: Baylor (LB)
- 1999–2005: Middle Tennessee
- 2006: Tennessee Titans (adv. scout)
- 2007–2009: NC State (LB)
- 2010–2011: Georgia Tech (DL/RC)
- 2012: Georgia Tech (DL/LB/RC)
- 2013–2015: Georgia Tech (LB/RC)
- 2016: Georgia Tech (S/RC)
- 2017: Georgia Tech (S)
- 2018: Georgia Tech (ILB)
- 2020: Western Carolina (DC/ILB)
- 2021–2022: Buffalo (senior analyst)
- 2023–2025: Sewanee

Head coaching record
- Overall: 42–66

Accomplishments and honors

Championships
- 1 Sun Belt (2001)

John Andrew McCollum (born March 1, 1959) is an American football coach. He was the head coach of the Middle Tennessee Blue Raiders football program from 1999 to 2005 and of the Sewanee Tigers football program from 2023 to 2025.

== Coaching career ==
McCollum was an assistant at Georgia Tech from 2010 to 2018. Head coach Paul Johnson retired at the end of the 2018 season. Incoming head coach Geoff Collins did not retain any of the former staff, although there was some thought McCollum's ability as a recruiter might lead to his retention.

McCollum returned to coaching in 2020 when Western Carolina hired him as defensive coordinator under head coach Mark Speir, replacing John Wiley.

== Head coaching record ==
Year	Team	Overall	Conference	Standing	Bowl/playoffs
Middle Tennessee Blue Raiders (NCAA Division I-A independent) (1999–2000)
1999	Middle Tennessee	3–8			
2000	Middle Tennessee	6–5			
Middle Tennessee Blue Raiders (Sun Belt Conference) (2001–2005)
2001	Middle Tennessee	8–3	5–1	T–1st	
2002	Middle Tennessee	4–8	2–4	T–4th	
2003	Middle Tennessee	4–8	3–3	T–3rd	
2004	Middle Tennessee	5–6	4–4	T–4th	
2005	Middle Tennessee	4–7	3–4	T–4th	
Middle Tennessee:		34–45	17–16		
Sewanee Tigers (Southern Athletic Association) (2023–2025)
2023	Sewanee	3–7	2–6	T–7th	
2024	Sewanee	2–8	1–6	8th	
2025	Sewanee	3–6 (Note: Sewanee fired McCollum after nine games)	1–5		
Sewanee:		8–21	4–17		
Total:		42–66			
National championship Conference title Conference division title or championship game berth
