= 2004 Tennessee Volunteers football team =

American college football season

2004 Tennessee Volunteers football

SEC Eastern Division champion Cotton Bowl Classic champion

SEC Championship Game, L 28–38 vs. Auburn

Cotton Bowl Classic, W 38–7 vs. Texas A&M
- Conference: Southeastern Conference
- Eastern Division

Ranking
- Coaches: No. 15
- AP: No. 13
- Record: 10–3 (7–1 SEC)
- Head coach: Phillip Fulmer (12th season)
- Offensive coordinator: Randy Sanders (6th season)
- Offensive scheme: Pro-style
- Defensive coordinator: John Chavis (10th season)
- Base defense: Multiple 4–3
- Home stadium: Neyland Stadium

2004 Southeastern Conference football standings
	Conf.			Overall
Team	W		L	W		L
Eastern Division
No. 13 Tennessee x	7	–	1	10	–	3
No. 7 Georgia	6	–	2	10	–	2
Florida	4	–	4	7	–	5
South Carolina	4	–	4	6	–	5
Kentucky	1	–	7	2	–	9
Vanderbilt	1	–	7	2	–	9
Western Division
No. 2 Auburn x$	8	–	0	13	–	0
No. 16 LSU	6	–	2	9	–	3
Alabama	3	–	5	6	–	6
Arkansas	3	–	5	5	–	6
Ole Miss	3	–	5	4	–	7
Mississippi State	2	–	6	3	–	8
Championship: Auburn 38, Tennessee 28
$ – BCS representative as conference champion; x – Division champion/co-champions; Rankings from AP Poll

The 2004 Tennessee Volunteers (variously "Tennessee", "UT", or the "Vols") represented the University of Tennessee in the 2004 NCAA Division I-A football season. Playing as a member of the Southeastern Conference (SEC) Eastern Division, the team was led by head coach Phillip Fulmer, in his twelfth full year, and played their home games at Neyland Stadium in Knoxville, Tennessee. They finished the season with a record of ten wins and three losses (10–3 overall, 7–1 in the SEC), as the SEC Eastern Division champions and as champions of the Cotton Bowl Classic after they defeated Texas A&M.

== Schedule ==
Date	Time	Opponent	Rank	Site	TV	Result	Attendance
September 5	8:00 pm	UNLV*	No. 14	Neyland Stadium; Knoxville, TN	ESPN	W 42–17	108,625
September 18	8:00 pm	No. 11 Florida	No. 13	Neyland Stadium; Knoxville, TN (Third Saturday in September)	CBS	W 30–28	109,061‡
September 25	7:00 pm	Louisiana Tech*^{†}	No. 11	Neyland Stadium; Knoxville, TN	PPV	W 42–17	104,257
October 2	7:45 pm	No. 8 Auburn	No. 10	Neyland Stadium; Knoxville, TN (College GameDay) (rivalry)	ESPN	L 10–34	107,828
October 9	3:30 pm	at No. 3 Georgia	No. 17	Sanford Stadium; Athens, GA (rivalry)	CBS	W 19–14	92,746
October 16	9:00 pm	at Ole Miss	No. 13	Vaught–Hemingway Stadium; Oxford, MS (rivalry)	ESPN2	W 21–17	62,028
October 23	3:30 pm	Alabama	No. 11	Neyland Stadium; Knoxville, TN (Third Saturday in October)	CBS	W 17–13	107,017
October 30	12:30 pm	at South Carolina	No. 11	Williams-Brice Stadium; Columbia, SC (rivalry)	JP	W 43–29	81,400
November 6	3:30 pm	Notre Dame*	No. 9	Neyland Stadium; Knoxville, TN	CBS	L 13–17	107,266
November 20	12:30 pm	at Vanderbilt	No. 15	Vanderbilt Stadium; Nashville, TN (rivalry)	JP	W 38–33	32,312
November 27	12:30 pm	Kentucky	No. 15	Neyland Stadium; Knoxville, TN (Battle for the Barrel)	JP	W 37–31	102,453
December 4	6:00 pm	vs. No. 3 Auburn	No. 15	Georgia Dome; Atlanta, GA (SEC Championship Game) (College GameDay) (rivalry)	CBS	L 28–38	74,892
January 1, 2005	11:00 am	vs. No. 22 Texas A&M*	No. 15	Cotton Bowl; Dallas, TX (Cotton Bowl Classic)	FOX	W 38–7	75,704
*Non-conference game; ^{†}Homecoming; Rankings from AP Poll released prior to the game

- ‡ New Neyland Stadium Attendance Record

== Personnel ==
2004 Tennessee Volunteers football team roster
Players
Coaches
Offense

Pos.	#	Name	Class
QB	10	Erik Ainge	Fr
QB	16	Rick Clausen	Jr
WR	17	C.J. Fayton	Jr
RB	21	Cedric Houston
WR	3	Robert Meacham	Fr
OL	77	Michael Munoz
RB	31	Gerald Riggs Jr.	Jr
QB	7	Brent Schaeffer	Fr
WR	1	Jayson Swain	So

Defense

Pos.	#	Name	Class
DT	55	Jesse Mahelona	So
DB	22	Robert Boulware
LB	2	Kevin Burnett	Sr
LB	44	Omar Gaither	Jr

Special teams

Pos.	#	Name	Class
P	47	Dustin Colquitt	Sr
K	25	James Wilhoit	So

Head coach

- Phillip Fulmer

Coordinators/assistant coaches

- Randy Sanders – Offensive coordinator/quarterbacks
- Trooper Taylor – Running backs
- Pat Washington – Wide receivers
- Greg Adkins – Tight ends/assistant offensive line/recruiting coordinator
- Jimmy Ray Stephens – Offensive line
- John Chavis – Defensive coordinator/linebackers
- Dan Brooks – Defensive line
- Larry Slade – Defensive backs
- Steve Caldwell – Special teams/defensive ends
- Jason Michael – Graduate assistant

Legend

- (C) Team captain
- (S) Suspended
- (I) Ineligible
- Injured
- Redshirt

== Season summary ==
=== At Vanderbilt ===
#15 Tennessee Volunteers (7–2) at Vanderbilt Commodores (2–8)

Quarter	1	2	3	4	Total
Tennessee	14	14	10	0	38
Vanderbilt	6	14	0	13	33

at Vanderbilt Stadium, Nashville, Tennessee

- Date: November 20
- Game time: 12:30 p.m.
- Box Score

Game information

First quarter

- TEN – Cedric Houston 6-yard run (James Wilhoit kick), 12:55. Tennessee 7–0. Drive:
- TEN – Cedric Houston 11-yard run (James Wilhoit kick), 7:39. Tennessee 14–0. Drive:
- VAN – Marlon White 11-yard pass from Jay Cutler (kick failed), 2:13. Tennessee 14–6. Drive:

Second quarter

- TEN – Cedric Houston 5-yard run (James Wilhoit kick), 12:25. Tennessee 21–6. Drive:
- TEN – Jayson Swain 20-yard pass from Rick Clausen (James Wilhoit kick), 11:17. Tennessee 28–6. Drive:
- VAN – Brandon Smith 80-yard pass from Jay Cutler (pass good), 11:00. Tennessee 28–14. Drive:
- VAN – Jeff Jennings 2-yard run (kick failed), 3:02. Tennessee 28–20. Drive:

Third quarter

- TEN – James Wilhoit 34-yard field goal, 10:36. Tennessee 31–20. Drive:
- TEN – Jayson Swain 5-yard pass from Rick Clausen (James Wilhoit kick), 4:44. Tennessee 38–20. Drive:

Fourth quarter

- VAN – Jeff Jennings 10-yard run (pass failed), 14:45. Tennessee 38–26. Drive:
- VAN – Dustin Dunning 3-yard pass from Jay Cutler (Abtin Iranmanesh kick), 4:30. Tennessee 38–33. Drive:

Top passers

- TEN – Rick Clausen – 19/30, 189 yards, 2 TD, 2 INT
- VAN – Jay Cutler – 22/33, 314 yards, 3 TD, 2 INT

Top rushers

- TEN – Gerald Riggs Jr. – 16 rushes, 149 yards
- VAN – Norval McKenzie – 9 rushes, 46 yards

Top receivers

- TEN – Cory Anderson – 3 receptions, 40 yards
- VAN – Brandon Smith – 8 receptions, 160 yards, TD

== Team players drafted into the NFL ==
Player	Position	Round	Pick	NFL club
Kevin Burnett	Linebacker	2	42	Dallas Cowboys
Dustin Colquitt	Punter	3	99	Kansas City Chiefs
Cedric Houston	Running Back	6	182	New York Jets
