= 2004 Vanderbilt Commodores football team =

American college football season

2004 Vanderbilt Commodores football
- Conference: Southeastern Conference
- Eastern Division
- Record: 2–9 (1–7 SEC)
- Head coach: Bobby Johnson (3rd season)
- Offensive coordinator: Ted Cain (3rd season)
- Offensive scheme: Multiple
- Defensive coordinator: Bruce Fowler (3rd season)
- Base defense: 4–3
- Captains: Jay Cutler; Justin Geisinger; Jovan Haye; Chris Young
- Home stadium: Vanderbilt Stadium

2004 Southeastern Conference football standings
	Conf.			Overall
Team	W		L	W		L
Eastern Division
No. 13 Tennessee x	7	–	1	10	–	3
No. 7 Georgia	6	–	2	10	–	2
Florida	4	–	4	7	–	5
South Carolina	4	–	4	6	–	5
Kentucky	1	–	7	2	–	9
Vanderbilt	1	–	7	2	–	9
Western Division
No. 2 Auburn x$	8	–	0	13	–	0
No. 16 LSU	6	–	2	9	–	3
Alabama	3	–	5	6	–	6
Arkansas	3	–	5	5	–	6
Ole Miss	3	–	5	4	–	7
Mississippi State	2	–	6	3	–	8
Championship: Auburn 38, Tennessee 28
$ – BCS representative as conference champion; x – Division champion/co-champions; Rankings from AP Poll

The 2004 Vanderbilt Commodores football team represented Vanderbilt University as a member of the Eastern Division of the Southeastern Conference (SEC) during the 2004 NCAA Division I-A football season. Led third-year head coach Bobby Johnson, the Commodores compiled an overall record of 2–9 with a mark of 1–7 in conference play, tying for fifth place at the bottom of the SEC's Eastern Division standings. The team played home games at Vanderbilt Stadium in Nashville, Tennessee.

The Commodores offense scored 212 points while the defense allowed 268 points.

== Schedule ==
Date	Time	Opponent	Site	TV	Result	Attendance
September 4	11:30 a.m.	South Carolina	Vanderbilt Stadium; Nashville, TN	JPS	L 6–31	33,670
September 18	11:30 a.m.	at Ole Miss	Vaught–Hemingway Stadium; Oxford, MS (rivalry)	JPS	L 23–26 ^{OT}	55,824
September 25	1:30 p.m.	at Navy*	Navy–Marine Corps Memorial Stadium; Annapolis, MD		L 26–29	32,809
October 2	6:00 p.m.	Mississippi State	Vanderbilt Stadium; Nashville, TN		W 31–13	27,292
October 9	7:00 p.m.	Rutgers*	Vanderbilt Stadium; Nashville, TN		L 34–37	28,342
October 16	11:30 a.m.	at No. 12 Georgia	Sanford Stadium; Athens, GA (rivalry)	JPS	L 3–33	92,746
October 23	1:00 p.m.	Eastern Kentucky*^{†}	Vanderbilt Stadium; Nashville, TN		W 19–7	16,500
October 30	7:00 p.m.	at No. 19 LSU	Tiger Stadium; Baton Rouge, LA	PPV	L 7–24	90,825
November 6	11:00 a.m.	Florida	Vanderbilt Stadium; Nashville, TN	PPV	L 17–34	32,716
November 13	12:00 p.m.	at Kentucky	Commonwealth Stadium; Lexington, KY (rivalry)		L 13–14	55,278
November 20	11:30 a.m.	No. 15 Tennessee	Vanderbilt Stadium; Nashville, TN (rivalry)	JPS	L 33–38	32,312
*Non-conference game; ^{†}Homecoming; Rankings from AP Poll released prior to the game; All times are in Central time

== Game summaries ==
=== Tennessee ===
#15 Tennessee Volunteers (7–2) at Vanderbilt Commodores (2–8)

Quarter	1	2	3	4	Total
Tennessee	14	14	10	0	38
Vanderbilt	6	14	0	13	33

at Vanderbilt Stadium, Nashville, Tennessee

- Date: November 20
- Game time: 12:30 p.m.
- Box Score

Game information

First quarter

- TEN – Cedric Houston 6-yard run (James Wilhoit kick), 12:55. Tennessee 7–0. Drive:
- TEN – Cedric Houston 11-yard run (James Wilhoit kick), 7:39. Tennessee 14–0. Drive:
- VAN – Marlon White 11-yard pass from Jay Cutler (kick failed), 2:13. Tennessee 14–6. Drive:

Second quarter

- TEN – Cedric Houston 5-yard run (James Wilhoit kick), 12:25. Tennessee 21–6. Drive:
- TEN – Jayson Swain 20-yard pass from Rick Clausen (James Wilhoit kick), 11:17. Tennessee 28–6. Drive:
- VAN – Brandon Smith 80-yard pass from Jay Cutler (pass good), 11:00. Tennessee 28–14. Drive:
- VAN – Jeff Jennings 2-yard run (kick failed), 3:02. Tennessee 28–20. Drive:

Third quarter

- TEN – James Wilhoit 34-yard field goal, 10:36. Tennessee 31–20. Drive:
- TEN – Jayson Swain 5-yard pass from Rick Clausen (James Wilhoit kick), 4:44. Tennessee 38–20. Drive:

Fourth quarter

- VAN – Jeff Jennings 10-yard run (pass failed), 14:45. Tennessee 38–26. Drive:
- VAN – Dustin Dunning 3-yard pass from Jay Cutler (Abtin Iranmanesh kick), 4:30. Tennessee 38–33. Drive:

Top passers

- TEN – Rick Clausen – 19/30, 189 yards, 2 TD, 2 INT
- VAN – Jay Cutler – 22/33, 314 yards, 3 TD, 2 INT

Top rushers

- TEN – Gerald Riggs Jr. – 16 rushes, 149 yards
- VAN – Norval McKenzie – 9 rushes, 46 yards

Top receivers

- TEN – Cory Anderson – 3 receptions, 40 yards
- VAN – Brandon Smith – 8 receptions, 160 yards, TD

== Roster ==
2004 Vanderbilt Commodores football team roster
Players
Coaches
Offense

Pos.	#	Name	Class
QB		Jay Cutler (C)	Jr
FB		Clark Lea	Sr
TE		Dustin Dunning	Jr
G		Justin Geisinger (C)
RB		Jeff Jennings	Fr
RB		Norval McKenzie	Sr
WR		Brandon Smith	Sr
WR		Marlon White	So
WR		Chris Young (C)	Sr

Defense

Pos.	#	Name	Class
DE		Jovan Haye (C)

Special teams

Pos.	#	Name	Class
P, K		Abtin Iranmanesh	Jr
K		Patrick Johnson	So
P		Kyle Keown	Fr

Head coach

- Bobby Johnson

Coordinators/assistant coaches

- Ted Cain (OC)
- Bruce Fowler (DC)

Legend

- (C) Team captain
- (S) Suspended
- (I) Ineligible
- Injured
- Redshirt

== Team players drafted into the NFL ==
Player	Position	Round	Pick	NFL club
Jovan Haye	DE	6	189	Carolina Panthers
Justin Geisinger	G	6	197	Buffalo Bills
