= 2004 Georgia Bulldogs football team =

American college football season

2004 Georgia Bulldogs football

Outback Bowl champion

Outback Bowl, W 24–21 vs. Wisconsin
- Conference: Southeastern Conference
- Eastern Division

Ranking
- Coaches: No. 6
- AP: No. 7
- Record: 10–2 (6–2 SEC)
- Head coach: Mark Richt (4th season)
- Offensive coordinator: Neil Callaway (4th season)
- Offensive scheme: Pro-style
- Defensive coordinator: Brian VanGorder (4th season)
- Base defense: 4–3
- Home stadium: Sanford Stadium

2004 Southeastern Conference football standings
	Conf.			Overall
Team	W		L	W		L
Eastern Division
No. 13 Tennessee x	7	–	1	10	–	3
No. 7 Georgia	6	–	2	10	–	2
Florida	4	–	4	7	–	5
South Carolina	4	–	4	6	–	5
Kentucky	1	–	7	2	–	9
Vanderbilt	1	–	7	2	–	9
Western Division
No. 2 Auburn x$	8	–	0	13	–	0
No. 16 LSU	6	–	2	9	–	3
Alabama	3	–	5	6	–	6
Arkansas	3	–	5	5	–	6
Ole Miss	3	–	5	4	–	7
Mississippi State	2	–	6	3	–	8
Championship: Auburn 38, Tennessee 28
$ – BCS representative as conference champion; x – Division champion/co-champions; Rankings from AP Poll

The 2004 Georgia Bulldogs football team represented the University of Georgia as a member of the Southeastern Conference (SEC) during the 2004 NCAA Division I-A football season. Led by fourth-year head coach Mark Richt, the Bulldogs compiled an overall record of 10–2 with a mark of 6–2, placing second in the SEC's Eastern Division. Georgia was invited to the Outback Bowl, where the Bulldogs beat Wisconsin. The team played home games at Sanford Stadium in Athens, Georgia.

== Schedule ==
Date	Time	Opponent	Rank	Site	TV	Result	Attendance
September 4	3:00 p.m.	No. 10 (I-AA) Georgia Southern*	No. 3	Sanford Stadium; Athens, GA	FSN	W 48–28	92,746
September 11	5:30 p.m.	at South Carolina	No. 3	Williams–Brice Stadium; Columbia, SC (rivalry, College GameDay)	ESPN	W 20–16	84,300
September 18	1:00 p.m.	Marshall*	No. 3	Sanford Stadium; Athens, GA	CSS	W 13–3	92,746
October 2	3:30 p.m.	No. 13 LSU	No. 3	Sanford Stadium; Athens, GA	CBS	W 45–16	92,746
October 9	3:30 p.m.	No. 17 Tennessee	No. 3	Sanford Stadium; Athens, GA (rivalry)	CBS	L 14–19	92,746
October 16	12:30 p.m.	Vanderbilt^{†}	No. 12	Sanford Stadium; Athens, GA (rivalry)	JPS	W 33–3	92,746
October 23	7:00 p.m.	at Arkansas	No. 10	Donald W. Reynolds Razorback Stadium; Fayetteville, AR	ESPN2	W 20–14	71,644
October 30	3:30 p.m.	vs. Florida	No. 10	Alltel Stadium; Jacksonville, FL (rivalry)	CBS	W 31–24	84,753
November 6	12:30 p.m.	at Kentucky	No. 8	Commonwealth Stadium; Lexington, KY	JPS	W 62–17	63,110
November 13	3:30 p.m.	at No. 3 Auburn	No. 8	Jordan–Hare Stadium; Auburn, AL (Deep South's Oldest Rivalry, College GameDay)	CBS	L 6–24	87,451
November 27	3:30 p.m.	Georgia Tech*	No. 8	Sanford Stadium; Athens, GA (Clean, Old-Fashioned Hate)	CBS	W 19–13	92,746
January 1, 2005	11:00 a.m.	vs. No. 16 Wisconsin*	No. 8	Raymond James Stadium; Tampa, FL (Outback Bowl)	ESPN2	W 24–21	62,414
*Non-conference game; ^{†}Homecoming; Rankings from AP Poll released prior to the game; All times are in Eastern time

== Roster ==
2004 Georgia Bulldogs football team roster
Players
Coaches
Offense

Pos.	#	Name	Class
OT	67	Chester Adams	Fr
WR	1	Reggie Brown	Sr
RB	20	Thomas Brown	Fr
WR	82	Fred Gibson	Sr
G	74	Max Jean-Gilles	Jr
QB	14	David Greene	Sr
G	70	Nick Jones	So
WR	16	Bryan McClendon	Jr
TE	87	Martrez Milner	Jr
TE	81	Leonard Pope	So
OT	66	Dennis Roland	Jr
OT	79	Ken Shackleford	So
QB	3	D. J. Shockley	Jr
QB	13	Joe Tereshinski III	So
G	75	Fernando Velasco	So
RB	28	DJ Ware	Fr

Defense

Pos.	#	Name	Class
SS	25	Tra Battle	So
SS	17	Greg Blue	Jr
FS	10	Thomas Davis Sr.	Jr
DT	97	Kedric Golston	Jr
LB	46	Arnold Harrison	Sr
CB	23	Tim Jennings	Jr
DE	99	Charles Johnson	Fr
LB	12	Brandon Miller	Fr
CB	2	DeMario Minter	Jr
DE	94	Quentin Moses	So
LB	8	Paul Oliver	Fr
DE	47	David Pollack	Sr
LB	33	Odell Thurman	Jr

Special teams

Pos.	#	Name	Class
K	96	Brandon Coutu	Fr

Head coach

- Mark Richt

Coordinators/assistant coaches

Legend

- (C) Team captain
- (S) Suspended
- (I) Ineligible
- Injured
- Redshirt
