= Auburn–Tennessee football rivalry =

American college football rivalry

- Auburn Tigers Tennessee Volunteers
- First meeting: November 10, 1900; Auburn, 23–0
- Latest meeting: October 3, 2026; Tennessee, 24–14
- Next meeting: 2028

Statistics
- Total meetings: 55
- All-time series: Auburn leads, 29–23–3
- Largest victory: Tennessee, 42–0 (1980)
- Longest win streak: Auburn, 6 (2003–2013)
- Current win streak: Tennessee, 1 (2026–present)

Locations of Auburn and Tennessee

The Auburn–Tennessee football rivalry is an American college football rivalry between the Auburn Tigers and Tennessee Volunteers. The game was traditionally played prior to the 1992 football season, when the Southeastern Conference split into its Eastern and Western divisions. Auburn leads the series 29–23–3.

== Series history ==
The series started in 1900 with a 23–0 Auburn victory in Birmingham, Alabama, and was played traditionally from 1956 to 1991. When the SEC split into two divisions in 1992, Auburn was placed to west division and Tennessee was placed to the east division, and the rivalry was no longer played annually with both schools only meeting every five to seven years. Every east and west teams had two permanent cross division opponent's. Auburn opponent's were Florida and Georgia, and Tennessee's were Alabama and Arkansas. Although, Florida was dropped from Auburn's schedule ending that annual rivalry, and Arkansas was removed from Tennessee's leaving only one permanent cross division opponent. From their current divisions, Tennessee started a rivalry with Georgia, while Auburn began an important rivalry with LSU. Auburn is 7–5 vs Tennessee since the SEC expanded, and both teams met in the 1997, and 2004 SEC Championship Game. Auburn owns the longest win streak in series history at six from 2003 to 2013.

The Auburn–Tennessee game has been played in four locations. They have played in Birmingham, Alabama at Legion Field, Knoxville, Tennessee at Neyland Stadium, Auburn, Alabama at Jordan–Hare Stadium and Atlanta, Georgia at the Georgia Dome. Auburn leads 10–5 in Birmingham, Tennessee leads 14–10–2 in Knoxville, Auburn leads 8–3–1 in Auburn and the teams are tied 1–1 in Atlanta.

On July 30, 2021, Texas and Oklahoma accepted to join the Southeastern Conference effective July 1, 2024, which could potentially lead to both teams meeting annually again.

== Notable games ==
- 1972: Unranked Auburn upset No. 4 Tennessee in Birmingham. Auburn led most of the game 10–0. Tennessee came back to cut the lead 10–6, but Auburn held on for the upset.
- 1985: In a game nationally televised by ABC, the Tigers came to Neyland Stadium ranked #1 with Heisman Trophy candidate Bo Jackson. However, Tennessee quarterback Tony Robinson made a case to be considered for the Heisman himself by passing for 259 yards and four touchdowns in a 38–20 blowout.
- 1990: Proving once again that big leads do not hold up in the Auburn–Tennessee series, Auburn spotted Tennessee a 26–9 fourth-quarter lead, only to storm back to tie it at 26–26. Auburn QB Stan White threw a pair of fourth-quarter touchdown passes, both on fourth down. Tennessee missed a potential game-winning field goal with 15 seconds left.
- 1991: The last annual meeting between both teams due to the expansion of the SEC. At that time, Neyland Stadium set a record of attendance where the #5 Tennessee defeated #13 Auburn, 30–21.
- 1997 SEC Championship Game: In the 1997 SEC Championship Game in Atlanta, Auburn scored 20 unanswered points to take a 20–7 lead. Tennessee scored two touchdowns late in the third quarter and another early in the fourth to win, 30–29. Tennessee's quarterback Peyton Manning threw for 373 yards and four touchdowns, while Auburn signal caller Dameyune Craig passed for 262 yards and a pair of scores. Tennessee went on and lost to Nebraska in the Orange Bowl, 42–17.
- 2003: Tennessee came into Jordan–Hare Stadium ranked No. 7. Auburn took their opening drive 80 yards and scored on a 6-yard run by Ronnie Brown. On their next possession, Jason Campbell threw a 29-yard touchdown pass in the left corner of the end zone to Ben Obomanu. The Auburn defense held Tennessee in check for most of the first half, but the Vols drove 85 yards to cut the lead to 14–7 at halftime. Cadillac Williams scored on a 1-yard run on Auburn's first possession of the second half to give the Tigers a 21–7 lead. Jason Campbell then completed an 8-yard touchdown pass to Cole Bennett on the second play of the fourth quarter to put Auburn up 28–7. Clausen threw for a touchdown on each of the Vols’ next two possessions bringing the score to 28–21 with just over seven minutes left in the game. The Vols drove to the Auburn 30-yard line late in the game but Carlos Rogers intercepted a pass to end the threat. Auburn won 28–21 to beat Tennessee for the first time since 1988.
- 2004 SEC Championship Game: After Auburn blew out the Vols in the regular season the two teams won their divisions and played again in SEC Championship game. Auburn won the SEC Championship with a 38–28 victory then went on to defeat Virginia Tech in the Sugar Bowl.

== Game results ==
Auburn victories	Tennessee victories	Tie games

No.	Date	Location	Winning team		Losing team	
1	November 10, 1900	Birmingham, AL	Auburn	23	Tennessee	0
2	November 2, 1929	Knoxville, TN	Tennessee	27	Auburn	0
3	October 12, 1935	Birmingham, AL	Tennessee	13	Auburn	6
4	October 10, 1936	Knoxville, TN	Auburn	6	Tennessee	0
5	November 6, 1937	Birmingham, AL	Auburn	20	No. 15 Tennessee	7
6	October 8, 1938	Knoxville, TN	Tennessee	7	Auburn	0
7	December 9, 1939	Knoxville, TN	No. 2 Tennessee	7	Auburn	0
8	September 29, 1956	Birmingham, AL	Tennessee	35	Auburn	7
9	September 28, 1957	Knoxville, TN	Auburn	7	No. 8 Tennessee	0
10	September 27, 1958	Birmingham, AL	No. 3 Auburn	13	Tennessee	0
11	September 26, 1959	Knoxville, TN	Tennessee	3	No. 3 Auburn	0
12	September 24, 1960	Birmingham, AL	Tennessee	10	Auburn	3
13	September 30, 1961	Knoxville, TN	Auburn	24	Tennessee	21
14	September 29, 1962	Birmingham, AL	Auburn	22	Tennessee	21
15	September 28, 1963	Knoxville, TN	Auburn	23	Tennessee	19
16	September 26, 1964	Birmingham, AL	No. 8 Auburn	3	Tennessee	0
17	September 25, 1965	Knoxville, TN	Tie	13	Tie	13
18	September 24, 1966	Birmingham, AL	Tennessee	28	Auburn	0
19	September 30, 1967	Knoxville, TN	Tennessee	27	Auburn	13
20	November 9, 1968	Birmingham, AL	No. 18 Auburn	28	No. 5 Tennessee	14
21	September 27, 1969	Knoxville, TN	No. 19 Tennessee	45	No. 17 Auburn	19
22	September 26, 1970	Birmingham, AL	Auburn	36	No. 17 Tennessee	23
23	September 25, 1971	Knoxville, TN	No. 5 Auburn	10	No. 9 Tennessee	9
24	September 30, 1972	Birmingham, AL	Auburn	10	No. 4 Tennessee	6
25	September 29, 1973	Knoxville, TN	No. 9 Tennessee	21	No. 11 Auburn	0
26	September 28, 1974	Auburn, AL	Auburn	21	No. 14 Tennessee	0
27	September 27, 1975	Knoxville, TN	No. 16 Tennessee	21	Auburn	17
28	September 25, 1976	Birmingham, AL	Auburn	38	Tennessee	28

No.	Date	Location	Winning team		Losing team	
29	September 24, 1977	Knoxville, TN	Auburn	14	Tennessee	12
30	September 30, 1978	Birmingham, AL	Auburn	29	Tennessee	10
31	September 29, 1979	Knoxville, TN	Tennessee	35	Auburn	17
32	September 27, 1980	Auburn, AL	Tennessee	42	No. 18 Auburn	0
33	September 26, 1981	Knoxville, TN	Tennessee	10	Auburn	7
34	September 25, 1982	Auburn, AL	Auburn	24	Tennessee	14
35	September 24, 1983	Knoxville, TN	No. 11 Auburn	37	Tennessee	14
36	September 29, 1984	Auburn, AL	No. 20 Auburn	29	Tennessee	10
37	September 28, 1985	Knoxville, TN	Tennessee	38	No. 1 Auburn	20
38	September 27, 1986	Auburn, AL	No. 8 Auburn	34	Tennessee	8
39	September 26, 1987	Knoxville, TN	Tie	20	Tie	20
40	September 24, 1988	Auburn, AL	No. 4 Auburn	38	Tennessee	6
41	September 30, 1989	Knoxville, TN	No.12 Tennessee	21	No. 4 Auburn	14
42	September 29, 1990	Auburn, AL	Tie	26	Tie	26
43	September 28, 1991	Knoxville, TN	No. 5 Tennessee	30	No. 13 Auburn	21
44	December 6, 1997	Atlanta, GA	No. 3 Tennessee	30	No. 11 Auburn	29
45	October 3, 1998	Auburn, AL	No. 3 Tennessee	17	Auburn	9
46	October 2, 1999	Knoxville, TN	No. 7 Tennessee	24	Auburn	0
47	October 4, 2003	Auburn, AL	Auburn	28	No. 7 Tennessee	21
48	October 2, 2004	Knoxville, TN	No. 8 Auburn	34	No. 10 Tennessee	10
49	December 4, 2004	Atlanta, GA	No. 3 Auburn	38	No. 15 Tennessee	28
50	September 27, 2008	Auburn, AL	No. 15 Auburn	14	Tennessee	12
51	October 3, 2009	Knoxville, TN	Auburn	26	Tennessee	22
52	November 9, 2013	Knoxville, TN	No. 7 Auburn	55	Tennessee	23
53	October 13, 2018	Auburn, AL	Tennessee	30	No. 21 Auburn	24
54	November 21, 2020	Auburn, AL	No. 23 Auburn	30	Tennessee	17
55	October 3, 2026	Knoxville, TN	No. 17 Tennessee	24	Auburn	14
Series: Auburn leads 29–23–3

Sources: 2011 Auburn Football Media Guide 2011 Tennessee Football Media Guide and College Football Data Warehouse.

== See also ==
- List of NCAA college football rivalry games
