= 2004 Auburn Tigers football team =

American college football season

2004 Auburn Tigers football

National champion (GBE CF Ratings) SEC champion SEC Western Division champion Sugar Bowl champion

SEC Championship Game, W 38–28 vs. Tennessee

Sugar Bowl, W 16–13 vs. Virginia Tech
- Conference: Southeastern Conference
- Western Division

Ranking
- Coaches: No. 2
- AP: No. 2
- Record: 13–0 (8–0 SEC)
- Head coach: Tommy Tuberville (6th season)
- Offensive coordinator: Al Borges (1st season)
- Offensive scheme: Pro-style
- Defensive coordinator: Gene Chizik (3rd season)
- Base defense: 4–3
- Home stadium: Jordan–Hare Stadium

2004 Southeastern Conference football standings
	Conf.			Overall
Team	W		L	W		L
Eastern Division
No. 13 Tennessee x	7	–	1	10	–	3
No. 7 Georgia	6	–	2	10	–	2
Florida	4	–	4	7	–	5
South Carolina	4	–	4	6	–	5
Kentucky	1	–	7	2	–	9
Vanderbilt	1	–	7	2	–	9
Western Division
No. 2 Auburn x$	8	–	0	13	–	0
No. 16 LSU	6	–	2	9	–	3
Alabama	3	–	5	6	–	6
Arkansas	3	–	5	5	–	6
Ole Miss	3	–	5	4	–	7
Mississippi State	2	–	6	3	–	8
Championship: Auburn 38, Tennessee 28
$ – BCS representative as conference champion; x – Division champion/co-champions; Rankings from AP Poll

The 2004 Auburn Tigers football team represented Auburn University in the 2004 NCAA Division I-A football season. Auburn compiled a record of 13–0, winning the Southeastern Conference championship and winning the school's 8th national championship at the time. Despite not playing in the BCS Championship game, Auburn was named National Champion by nine different selectors, including six of the Massey Index selectors, and was the only NCAA team to go 13-0. Additionally, Auburn finished the season as the highest ranked NCAA eligible team in both the AP Poll and the Coaches' Poll as USC was disqualified from competition due to major violations. Beginning the season ranked #17 in the AP poll and #18 in the Coaches' Poll, the Tigers were denied a berth in the BCS National Championship Game because they finished the regular season ranked #3 in the BCS rankings. Head coach Tommy Tuberville, who was nearly fired after the 2003 season, was named national Coach of the Year by the Associated Press. This was Auburn's third undefeated season in which they played over ten games.

The team defeated LSU, Georgia, and Tennessee (twice, facing them a second time in the SEC Championship game), all of whom were ranked opponents. They were left out of the BCS National Championship Game, and instead went to the 2005 Sugar Bowl, beating #9 Virginia Tech, 16–13, to finish 13–0. USC and Oklahoma played for the national title in the Orange Bowl. USC's national title was later vacated by the NCAA. Darryl W. Perry, EFI and M Cubed, along with Massey Index Selectors: GBE College Football Ratings, Trexler, Kiser, RPI, Mark and Elrod all awarded their national titles to Auburn.

The team's roster featured four first-round NFL draft picks in running back Carnell Williams, running back Ronnie Brown, defensive back Carlos Rogers, and quarterback Jason Campbell, as well as five future Pro Bowl participants in offensive linemen Marcus McNeill and Ben Grubbs, running back Ronnie Brown, Carlos Rogers, and defensive tackle Jay Ratliff. Permanent team captains were Campbell, Williams, Brown, Rogers, and Bret Eddins. On August 19, 2025, Auburn University recognized a "National Championship" title for the 2004 season despite finishing second in all major polls.

== Schedule ==
Date	Time	Opponent	Rank	Site	TV	Result	Attendance
September 4	1:30 pm	Louisiana–Monroe*	No. 17	Jordan–Hare Stadium; Auburn, AL	PPV	W 31–0	80,663
September 11	11:30 am	at Mississippi State	No. 18	Davis Wade Stadium; Starkville, MS	JPS	W 43–14	51,021
September 18	2:30 pm	No. 5 LSU	No. 14	Jordan–Hare Stadium; Auburn, AL (rivalry)	CBS	W 10–9	87,451
September 25	1:30 pm	The Citadel*	No. 9	Jordan–Hare Stadium; Auburn, AL	CSS	W 33–3	76,302
October 2	6:45 pm	at No. 10 Tennessee	No. 8	Neyland Stadium; Knoxville, TN (rivalry, College GameDay)	ESPN	W 34–10	107,828
October 9	2:30 pm	Louisiana Tech*	No. 6	Jordan–Hare Stadium; Auburn, AL	PPV	W 52–7	77,016
October 16	2:30 pm	Arkansas	No. 4	Jordan–Hare Stadium; Auburn, AL	CBS	W 38–20	87,451
October 23	1:30 pm	Kentucky	No. 3	Jordan–Hare Stadium; Auburn, AL	CSS	W 42–10	85,263
October 30	6:45 pm	at Ole Miss	No. 3	Vaught–Hemingway Stadium; Oxford, MS (rivalry)	ESPN	W 35–14	60,787
November 13	2:30 pm	No. 8 Georgia	No. 3	Jordan–Hare Stadium; Auburn, AL (Deep South's Oldest Rivalry, College GameDay)	CBS	W 24–6	87,451
November 20	2:30 pm	at Alabama	No. 3	Bryant–Denny Stadium; Tuscaloosa, AL (Iron Bowl)	CBS	W 21–13	83,818
December 4	5:00 pm	vs. No. 15 Tennessee	No. 3	Georgia Dome; Atlanta, GA (SEC Championship Game, rivalry, College GameDay)	CBS	W 38–28	74,982
January 3	7:00 pm	vs. No. 9 Virginia Tech*	No. 3	Louisiana Superdome; New Orleans, LA (Sugar Bowl)	ABC	W 16–13	77,349
*Non-conference game; Rankings from AP Poll released prior to the game; All times are in Central time

== Statistics ==
=== Offense ===
Passing

Player name	Pos	COMP	ATT	PCT	YARDS	TD	INT	RATE
Jason Campbell	QB	188	270	69.6	2700	20	7	172.9

== Roster ==
No	Player Name	Pos	Ht	Wt	Yr	Hometown	(High School)
80	Maurice Anderson	SE	6–3	203	FR*	Semmes, Alabama	(Mary G Montgomery HS)
1	Devin Aromashodu	WR	6–2	205	JR	Miami Springs, Florida	(Miami Springs HS)
64	Rhett Autrey	OG	6–4	283	JR	Jay, Florida	(Jay HS)
80	Octavious Balkcom	LB	6–4	225	FR	Blakely, Georgia	(Early County HS)
3	Tony Bell	S	6–2	205	FR	Alabaster, Alabama	(Thompson HS)
87	Cole Bennett	TE	6–5	244	SO	Dalton, Georgia	(Dalton HS)
30	Kody Bliss	P	5-11	193	SO	Brentwood, Tennessee	(Brentwood Academy)
11	Calvin Booker	QB	6–3	225	FR	Atlanta, Georgia	(Mays HS)
71	Jarrod Britt	OL	6–3	299	SO	Powder Springs, GA	(McEachern HS)
33	Eric Brock	S	6–1	203	FR*	Alexander City, AL	(Benjamin Russell HS)
92	Chris Browder	DE	6–4	240	SO	Camden, Alabama	(Wilcox Central HS)
91	Neil Brown	NG	6–2	256	FR	Buford, Georgia	(Buford HS)
23	Ronnie Brown	RB	6–1	223	SR*	Cartersville, Georgia	(Cartersville HS)
52	Kevis Burnam	LB	6–2	236	JR	Montezuma, Georgia	(Macon County HS)
17	Anthony Campbell	DB	5–9	178	FR	Hialeah, Florida	(Hialeah Senior HS)
17	Jason Campbell	QB	6–5	228	SR*	Taylorsville, Mississippi	(Taylorsville HS)
55	Montavian Collier	OLB	6–1	219	FR*	Opelika, Alabama	(Opelika HS)
62	Pete Compton	LS	6–6	235	FR*	Brentwood, Tennessee	(Brentwood Academy)
50	Joe Cope	C	6–0	268	SO	Andalusia, Alabama	(Andalusia HS)
12	Brandon Cox	QB	6–2	200	FR*	Trussville, Alabama	(Hewitt-Trussville HS)
70	Antwoin Daniels	OG	6–6	265	FR	Forsyth, Georgia	(Mary Persons HS)
85	Silas Daniels	WR	6–0	193	SR	Jacksonville, Florida	(Jean Ribault HS)
27	Tristan Davis	RB	5–10	188	FR	East Point, Georgia	(Tri-Cities HS)
21	Karibi Dede	OLB	6–1	206	SO*	Woodbridge, Virginia	(C. D. Hylton HS)
81	Kyle Derozan	TE	6–3	252	SO*	Morganza, Louisiana	(Pointe Coupee Central HS)
96	Wayne Dickens	NG	6–1	297	JR*	Lakeland, Florida	(Lake Gibson Senior HS)
99	Tez Doolittle	DL	6–3	298	FR*	Opelika, Alabama	(Opelika HS)
76	Tim Duckworth	OL	6–3	314	SO	Taylorsville, Mississippi	(Taylorsville HS)
77	King Dunlap	OL	6–8	292	FR*	Brentwood, Tennessee	(Brentwood Academy)
94	Bret Eddins	DE	6–5	267	SR*	Montgomery, Alabama	(Trinity Presbyterian Sch Inc)
76	Nathan Farrow	DL	6–3	296	FR	Birmingham, Al	(Clay-Chalkville High School)
41	Lorenzo Ferguson	DB	6–1	192	FR	Miami, Florida	(Miami Southridge HS)
16	Blake Field	QB	6–3	195	FR	Tallahassee, Florida	(North Florida Christian)
26	Steve Gandy	S	6–1	200	FR	Waynesboro, Mississippi	(Wayne County HS)
38	Zach Gilbert	CB	5–10	189	FR*	Florence, Alabama	(Bradshaw HS)
10	Dustin Goodwin	QB	6–1	203	SO	Demopolis, Alabama	(Demopolis HS)
29	Derrick Graves	OLB	6–1	222	SR	Holt, Alabama	(Holt HS)
90	Tyronne Green	DT	6–3	275	FR	Pensacola, Florida	(W. J. Woodham HS)
54	Quentin Groves	DE	6–3	249	FR*	Greenville, Mississippi	(Greenville HS)
69	Ben Grubbs	OL	6–3	289	SO*	Eclectic, Alabama	(Elmore County HS)
25	Lee Guess	WR	5–10	177	SO*	Trussville, Alabama	(Hewitt-Trussville HS)
48	Marquies Gunn	DE	6–4	234	SO	Alexander City, AL	(Benjamin Russell HS)
56	Courtney Harden	LB	6–1	215	FR	Leighton, Alabama	(Colbert County HS)
72	Leon Hart	OL	6–5	290	FR	Columbia, South Carolina	(Spring Valley HS)
11	Josh Hebert	DB	5-10	190	FR	Houston, Texas	(Klein HS)
35	Will Herring	FS	6–4	212	SO*	Opelika, Alabama	(Opelika HS)
15	Wesley Hill	QB	6–3	217	SO*	Cordele, Georgia	(Crisp County HS)
49	Kevin Hobbs	FS	6–0	183	JR*	Tampa, Florida	(Tampa Bay Technical HS)
42	Brett Holliman	SS	5–10	177	SR*	Selma, Alabama	(John T Morgan Academy)
43	Evander Holyfield	WR	6–3	176	FR*	Fairburn, Georgia	(Landmark Christian School)
26	Alex Howell	RB	5–9	172	FR*	Montgomery, Alabama	(St. James School)
67	Jeremy Ingle	C	6–2	275	SR*	Montgomery, Alabama	(St. James School)
6	David Irons	CB	6–1	183	JR	Dacula, Georgia	(Dacula HS)
26	Kenny Irons	RB	5–11	193	JR	Dacula, Georgia	(Dacula HS)
58	Tommy Jackson	NG	6–1	304	JR	Opelika, Alabama	(Opelika HS)
59	Merrill Johnson	LB	6–1	185	FR	Butler, Alabama	(Choctaw County HS)
98	Doug Langenfeld	DE	6–3	254	SR	Moncks Corner, South Carolina	(Berkeley HS)
20	Patrick Lee	CB	6–0	198	FR*	Miami, Florida	(Christopher Columbus HS)
28	Brad Lester	RB	5–11	188	FR	Lilburn, Georgia	(Parkview HS)
39	Andrew Letts	SS	6–1	202	JR*	Hinsdale, Illinois	(Hinsdale Central HS)
68	Danny Lindsey	OG	6–3	306	SR	Douglas, Georgia	(Coffee County HS)
75	Stanley McClover	DE	6–2	255	SO	Fort Lauderdale, FL	(Dillard HS)
45	Michael McLaughlin	FB	6–2	225	FR	Waynesboro, Mississippi	(Wayne County HS)
73	Marcus McNeill	OT	6–9	340	JR	Ellenwood, Georgia	(Cedar Grove HS)
9	Anthony Mix	WR	6–5	241	JR	Bay Minette, Alabama	(Baldwin County HS)
84	Charles Mullen	TE	6–4	233	FR	San Diego, California	(Madison Senior HS)
2	Ben Obomanu	WR	6–1	193	JR	Selma, Alabama	(Selma HS)
79	Jonathan Palmer	OG	6–5	317	SO*	Ellenwood, Georgia	(Cedar Grove HS)
89	Danny Perry	TE	6–2	245	FR*	Auburn, Alabama	(Auburn HS)
19	Montae Pitts	WR	6–3	203	SO*	Loachapoka, Alabama	(Loachapoka HS)
90	Rick Pollard	TE	6–2	229	SO*	Dalton, Georgia	(Dalton HS)
13	Jamoga Ramsey	WR	5–10	162	SO*	Delray Beach, Florida	(Atlantic HS)
83	Jay Ratliff	DT	6–5	278	SR	Valdosta, Georgia	(Lowndes HS)
66	Troy Reddick	OT	6–5	327	JR	Albany, Georgia	(Westover HS)
5	Sam Rives	WR	6–2	193	SR*	Pelham, Alabama	(Pelham HS)
14	Carlos Rogers	CB	6–1	194	SR	Augusta, Georgia	(Butler HS)
4	Junior Rosegreen	SS	6–0	196	SR*	Fort Lauderdale, FL	(Dillard HS)
74	Steven Ross	C	6–6	275	JR*	Nashville, Tennessee	(Christ Presbyterian Academy)
43	Pete Ruzicka	SS	6–0	211	SO*	Harmony, Pennsylvania	(Seneca Valley SHS)
40	Kevin Sears	LB	6–4	236	SO	Russellville, Alabama	(Russellville HS)
28	Blake Shrader	S	5–10	177	FR	Stevenson, Alabama	(North Jackson HS)
95	Pat Sims	DT	6–4	295	FR	Fort Lauderdale, Florida	(Dillard HS)
44	Jake Slaughter	FB	6–2	237	JR*	Brentwood, Tennessee	(Brentwood Academy)
22	Tre Smith	TB	5–10	200	JR	Venice, Florida	(Venice Senior HS)
57	Mayo Sowell	LB	6–2	225	SR*	Birmingham, Alabama	(Shades Valley Technical Academ)
32	Carl Stewart	RB	6–1	212	FR*	Maryville, Tennessee	(Maryville HS)
65	William Sullivan	OL	6–4	290	FR	Lillington, North Carolina	(Western Harnett HS)
82	James Swinton	WR	6–1	165	FR	Tucker, Georgia	(Tucker HS)
86	Courtney Taylor	WR	6–2	195	SO*	Carrollton, Alabama	(Carrollton HS)
97	Josh Thompson	DT	6–1	295	FR*	Statesboro, Georgia	(Statesboro HS)
78	Rich Trucks	OT	6–8	320	SR*	Hoover, Alabama	(Hoover HS)
47	Andrew Turman	FB	6–0	234	FR*	Hoover, Alabama	(Hoover HS)
37	John Vaughn	K	6–1	196	SO	Brentwood, Tennessee	(Brentwood Academy)
8	Cooper Wallace	TE	6–4	253	JR*	Nashville, Tennessee	(Christ Presbyterian Academy)
63	William Ward	C	6–2	270	SO*	Prattville, Alabama	(Prattville HS)
46	Jerald Watson	RB	5–11	198	FR	Morgan City, Louisiana	(Central Catholic HS)
31	Antarrious Williams	LB	5–11	205	JR*	Columbus, Georgia	(Shaw HS)
24	Carnell Williams	RB	5–11	204	SR	Attalla, Alabama	(Etowah HS)
36	Gerald Williams	CB	5–9	192	JR*	Columbus, Georgia	(Carver HS)
51	Travis Williams	LB	6–1	214	JR*	Columbia, South Carolina	(Spring Valley HS)
18	Philip Yost	K	6–0	195	SR	Auburn, Alabama	(Auburn HS)
10	Donnay Young	FS	6–0	204	SR*	College Park, Georgia	(North Clayton HS)
14	Brett Foster	K	6-1	225	SR	South Lamar	

15 Joseph Marlowe LB 5-0 210 SR Carrollton

- - Redshirt

== Captains ==
Position	Player
RB	Ronnie Brown
QB	Jason Campbell
DE	Bret Eddins
CB	Carlos Rogers
RB	Carnell Williams
