= 2004 South Carolina Gamecocks football team =

American college football season

2004 South Carolina Gamecocks football
- Conference: Southeastern Conference
- Eastern Division
- Record: 6–5 (4–4 SEC)
- Head coach: Lou Holtz (6th season)
- Offensive coordinator: Skip Holtz (6th season)
- Offensive scheme: Spread
- Defensive coordinator: Rick Minter (1st season)
- Base defense: 4–3
- Home stadium: Williams-Brice Stadium

2004 Southeastern Conference football standings
	Conf.			Overall
Team	W		L	W		L
Eastern Division
No. 13 Tennessee x	7	–	1	10	–	3
No. 7 Georgia	6	–	2	10	–	2
Florida	4	–	4	7	–	5
South Carolina	4	–	4	6	–	5
Kentucky	1	–	7	2	–	9
Vanderbilt	1	–	7	2	–	9
Western Division
No. 2 Auburn x$	8	–	0	13	–	0
No. 16 LSU	6	–	2	9	–	3
Alabama	3	–	5	6	–	6
Arkansas	3	–	5	5	–	6
Ole Miss	3	–	5	4	–	7
Mississippi State	2	–	6	3	–	8
Championship: Auburn 38, Tennessee 28
$ – BCS representative as conference champion; x – Division champion/co-champions; Rankings from AP Poll

The 2004 South Carolina Gamecocks football team represented the University of South Carolina in the Southeastern Conference (SEC) during the 2004 NCAA Division I-A football season. The Gamecocks were led by Lou Holtz in his sixth and final season as head coach and played their home games in Williams–Brice Stadium in Columbia, South Carolina. They finished the season with a 6–5 record.

Senior Dondrial Pinkins and sophomore Syvelle Newton shared the quarterback position. Wide receiver Troy Williamson became a focal point of the offense, nearly doubling his production. Free safety Ko Kimpson was named the SEC Freshman of the Year.

Holtz had privately indicated in the summer that the upcoming season might be his last. The Gamecocks started the season somewhat successfully, with five wins and two close conference losses. However, to Holtz's surprise, the Gamecocks then played poorly against No. 12 Tennessee at home, the first of three losses in South Carolina's final four games. During the two weeks between the losses to Tennessee and Florida, in secret, Holtz informed the athletics department that it would be his last season and former Florida head coach Steve Spurrier agreed to replace him.

Two days before the regular season finale against archrival Clemson, Holtz informed his players of his decision. Down 7–29 against the Tigers near the end of the fourth quarter, a fight broke out between the two teams. Although they had their first winning season since 2001, South Carolina declined to accept a bowl bid due to the team's involvement in the brawl, marking the first time the school had declined a bowl bid since 1990. Over the next several days, Holtz retired from coaching after 44 years and Spurrier was introduced as the next head coach at South Carolina.

== Schedule ==
The September 11 game against Georgia played host to ESPN's College Gameday.

Date	Time	Opponent	Rank	Site	TV	Result	Attendance
September 4	12:30 pm	at Vanderbilt		Vanderbilt Stadium; Nashville, Tennessee	JPS	W 31–6	33,670
September 11	5:30 pm	No. 3 Georgia		Williams-Brice Stadium; Columbia, South Carolina (rivalry) (College GameDay)	ESPN	L 16–20	84,300
September 18	7:00 pm	South Florida*		Williams-Brice Stadium; Columbia, South Carolina		W 34–3	78,900
September 25	7:00 pm	Troy*		Williams-Brice Stadium; Columbia, South Carolina	PPV	W 17–7	79,700
October 2	6:00 pm	at Alabama		Bryant–Denny Stadium; Tuscaloosa, Alabama	ESPN2	W 20–3	82,141
October 9	1:00 pm	Ole Miss^{†}	No. 25	Williams-Brice Stadium; Columbia, South Carolina	PPV	L 28–31	79,100
October 16	7:00 pm	at Kentucky		Commonwealth Stadium; Lexington, Kentucky	PPV	W 12–7	63,086
October 30	12:30 pm	No. 12 Tennessee		Williams-Brice Stadium; Columbia, South Carolina (rivalry)	JPS	L 29–43	81,400
November 6	12:30 pm	Arkansas		Williams-Brice Stadium; Columbia, South Carolina	JPS	W 35–32	78,800
November 13	7:00 pm	at Florida		Ben Hill Griffin Stadium; Gainesville, Florida	ESPN2	L 14–48	90,294
November 20	12:00 pm	at Clemson*		Memorial Stadium; Clemson, South Carolina (Palmetto Bowl)	JPS	L 7–29	82,382
*Non-conference game; ^{†}Homecoming; Rankings from AP Poll released prior to the game; All times are in Eastern time

== See also ==
- Hiring of Steve Spurrier at South Carolina
- 1978 Ohio State Buckeyes football team
