= 2004 Alabama Crimson Tide football team =

American college football season

2004 Alabama Crimson Tide football

Music City Bowl, L 16–20 vs. Minnesota
- Conference: Southeastern Conference
- Western Division
- Record: 6–6 (3–5 SEC)
- Head coach: Mike Shula (2nd season)
- Offensive coordinator: David Rader (2nd season)
- Offensive scheme: Pro-style
- Defensive coordinator: Joe Kines (4th season)
- Base defense: 3–3–5
- Captains: Todd Bates; Wesley Britt
- Home stadium: Bryant–Denny Stadium

2004 Southeastern Conference football standings
	Conf.			Overall
Team	W		L	W		L
Eastern Division
No. 13 Tennessee x	7	–	1	10	–	3
No. 7 Georgia	6	–	2	10	–	2
Florida	4	–	4	7	–	5
South Carolina	4	–	4	6	–	5
Kentucky	1	–	7	2	–	9
Vanderbilt	1	–	7	2	–	9
Western Division
No. 2 Auburn x$	8	–	0	13	–	0
No. 16 LSU	6	–	2	9	–	3
Alabama	3	–	5	6	–	6
Arkansas	3	–	5	5	–	6
Ole Miss	3	–	5	4	–	7
Mississippi State	2	–	6	3	–	8
Championship: Auburn 38, Tennessee 28
$ – BCS representative as conference champion; x – Division champion/co-champions; Rankings from AP Poll

The 2004 Alabama Crimson Tide football team represented the University of Alabama as a member of the Southeastern Conference (SEC) during the 2004 NCAA Division I-A football season. Led by second-year head coach Mike Shula, the Crimson Tide compiled an overall record of 6–6 with a mark of 3–5 in conference play, placing in a three-way tie for third in the SEC's Western Division. Alabama was invited to the Music City Bowl, where the Crimson Tide lost to Minnesota. For the first time ever, the team played all of their home games at Bryant–Denny Stadium in Tuscaloosa, Alabama.

Alabama began the 2004 season at 3–0 with blowout victories over Utah State, Mississippi, and Western Carolina. The Tide's starting quarterback, Brodie Croyle, was injured during the Western Carolina game and lost for the season. Without him, the team struggled to find consistent offense against SEC opponents Arkansas and South Carolina. The team rebounded to multiple blowouts victories in three of the next four games, only losing to rival Tennessee. The season ended on a three-game slide, losing to rivals LSU and Auburn, also losing in the Music City Bowl to Minnesota. This season was first since 1958 in which Alabama was absent from the AP poll every week of the season.

== Schedule ==
Date	Time	Opponent	Site	TV	Result	Attendance	Source
September 4	6:00 p.m.	Utah State*	Bryant–Denny Stadium; Tuscaloosa, AL	PPV	W 48–17	82,033	
September 11	8:00 p.m.	Ole Miss	Bryant–Denny Stadium; Tuscaloosa, AL (rivalry)	ESPN2	W 28–7	83,083	
September 18	6:00 p.m.	Western Carolina*	Bryant–Denny Stadium; Tuscaloosa, AL	PPV	W 52–0	77,306	
September 25	2:30 p.m.	at Arkansas	Donald W. Reynolds Razorback Stadium; Fayetteville, AR	CBS	L 10–27	72,543	
October 2	5:00 p.m.	South Carolina	Bryant–Denny Stadium; Tuscaloosa, AL	ESPN2	L 3–20	82,141	
October 9	11:30 a.m.	at Kentucky	Commonwealth Stadium; Lexington, KY	JPS	W 45–17	65,482	
October 16	2:30 p.m.	No. 24 Southern Miss*^{†}	Bryant–Denny Stadium; Tuscaloosa, AL	PPV	W 27–3	82,094	
October 23	2:30 p.m.	at No. 11 Tennessee	Neyland Stadium; Knoxville, TN (Third Saturday in October)	CBS	L 13–17	107,017	
November 6	5:30 p.m.	Mississippi State	Bryant–Denny Stadium; Tuscaloosa, AL (rivalry)	ESPN2	W 30–14	82,617	
November 13	6:45 p.m.	at No. 17 LSU	Tiger Stadium; Baton Rouge, LA (rivalry)	ESPN	L 10–26	91,861	
November 20	2:30 p.m.	No. 2 Auburn	Bryant–Denny Stadium; Tuscaloosa, AL (Iron Bowl)	CBS	L 13–21	83,818	
December 31	11:00 a.m.	vs. Minnesota*	The Coliseum; Nashville, TN (Music City Bowl)	ESPN	L 16–20	66,089	
*Non-conference game; ^{†}Homecoming; Rankings from AP Poll released prior to the game; All times are in Central time

== Game summaries ==
=== Utah State ===
Team	1	2	3	4	Total
Utah State	7	3	7	0	17
• Alabama	10	7	17	14	48

- Location: Tuscaloosa, Alabama
- Game start: 6:00 p.m.
- Elapsed time: 2:58
- Game attendance: 82,033
- Game weather: 84°, partly cloudy, winds NNE at 9 mph
- Referee: Rocky Goode

Alabama opened the 2004 season by defeating the Utah State Aggies 48–17. Brian Bostick scored the first Alabama points of the game with his 28-yard field goal. On the ensuing Aggies possession, Roman Harper intercepted a Travis Cox and returned it to the Utah State 21-yard line. Two plays later, Brodie Croyle threw a 19-yard touchdown pass to Clint Johnston to give the Crimson Tide a 10–0 lead. The Aggies responded later in the first with a 35-yard Cox touchdown pass to Kevin Robinson to cut the score to 10–7. In the second quarter, Kenneth Darby scored for Alabama on a 29-yard run and Ben Chaet connected on a 44-yard field goal for Utah State to make the halftime score 17–10.

On the third play of the second half, Simeon Castille intercepted a Cox pass and returned it 31-yards for his first career touchdown. After the Alabama defense forced a punt on the ensuing Aggies drive, Croyle threw a 57-yard touchdown strike to Keith Brown on the Crimson Tide's first offensive play of the second half to give them a 31–10 lead. After a 32-yard Bostick field goal extended the Alabama lead to 34–10, the Aggies responded with their final points of the game on a 21-yard Cox touchdown pass to Chris Forbes. The Crimson Tide then closed the game with a pair of fourth-quarter touchdowns. The first came on a one-yard Tim Castille run and the second on a seven-yard Ray Hudson run in the 48–17 Alabama victory.

=== Ole Miss ===
Team	1	2	3	4	Total
Ole Miss	0	0	0	7	7
• Alabama	0	14	7	7	28

- Location: Tuscaloosa, Alabama
- Game start: 8:05 p.m.
- Elapsed time: 2:56
- Game attendance: 83,083
- Game weather: 85°, partly cloudy, winds ENE at 3 mph
- Referee: Matt Austin

Alabama opened conference play by defeating their long-time rival, the Ole Miss Rebels 28–7. After a scoreless first, the Crimson Tide took a 14–0 halftime lead after scoring a pair of second-quarter touchdowns. Tim Castille scored first on a one-yard run and Tyrone Prothro scored second on a 15-yard Brodie Croyle touchdown pass. Alabama extended their lead to 21–0 in the third quarter when Ray Hudson scored his first of two touchdowns on a 13-yard Croyle pass. After the Rebels scored their only points of the game on a six-yard Eric Rice touchdown reception from Ethan Flatt, Alabama responded on the following drive with a 46-yard Hudson touchdown run to make the final score 28–7. In the game, Hudson ran for 116 yards, and D. J. Hall and Keith Brown became the first freshman receivers to start for Alabama since Ozzie Newsome in 1974.

=== Western Carolina ===
Team	1	2	3	4	Total
Western Carolina	0	0	0	0	0
• Alabama	14	17	7	14	52

- Location: Tuscaloosa, Alabama
- Game start: 6:06 p.m.
- Elapsed time: 2:46
- Game attendance: 77,306
- Game weather: 82°, clear, winds N at 14 mph
- Referee: Doyle Jackson

Alabama won their third straight game to open the season against the Division I-AA Western Carolina Catamounts 52–0.

=== Arkansas ===
Team	1	2	3	4	Total
Alabama	0	10	0	0	10
• Arkansas	7	7	0	13	27

- Location: Fayetteville, Arkansas
- Game start: 2:35 p.m.
- Elapsed time: 3:12
- Game attendance: 72,543
- Game weather: 80°, partly cloudy, winds E at 8 mph
- Referee: Terry Brown

=== South Carolina ===
Team	1	2	3	4	Total
• South Carolina	3	3	14	0	20
Alabama	0	3	0	0	3

- Location: Tuscaloosa, Alabama
- Game start: 5:01 p.m.
- Elapsed time: 2:49
- Game attendance: 82,141
- Game weather: 84°, cloudy, winds NNW at 9 mph
- Referee: Rocky Goode

=== Kentucky ===
Team	1	2	3	4	Total
• Alabama	7	10	14	14	45
Kentucky	0	7	7	3	17

- Location: Lexington, Kentucky
- Game start: 12:33 p.m.
- Elapsed time: 3:06
- Game attendance: 65,482
- Game weather: 64°, fair, winds SW at 6 mph
- Referee: Penn Wagers

=== Southern Miss ===
Team	1	2	3	4	Total
#24 Southern Miss	0	3	0	0	3
• Alabama	10	3	0	14	27

- Location: Tuscaloosa, Alabama
- Game start: 2:36 p.m.
- Elapsed time: 2:49
- Game attendance: 82,094
- Game weather: 69°, clear, winds WNW at 6 mph
- Referee: Jeff Roberson

=== Tennessee ===
Third Saturday in October

Team	1	2	3	4	Total
Alabama	7	3	0	3	13
• #11 Tennessee	7	7	3	0	17

- Location: Knoxville, Tennessee
- Game start: 2:35 p.m.
- Elapsed time: 3:18
- Game attendance: 107,017
- Game weather: 63°, cloudy, winds SW at 13 mph
- Referee: Steve Landis

=== Mississippi State ===
Team	1	2	3	4	Total
Mississippi State	7	0	7	0	14
• Alabama	0	17	3	10	30

- Location: Tuscaloosa, Alabama
- Game start: 5:36 p.m.
- Elapsed time: 3:14
- Game attendance: 82,617
- Game weather: 58°, clear, winds SSE at 8 mph
- Referee: Terry Brown

=== LSU ===
Team	1	2	3	4	Total
Alabama	7	3	0	0	10
• #17 LSU	0	6	7	13	26

- Location: Baton Rouge, Louisiana
- Game start: 6:47 p.m.
- Elapsed time: 3:01
- Game attendance: 91,861
- Game weather: 55°, clear, winds N at 6 mph
- Referee: Penn Wagers

=== Auburn ===
Iron Bowl

Team	1	2	3	4	Total
• #2 Auburn	0	0	14	7	21
Alabama	3	3	0	7	13

- Location: Tuscaloosa, Alabama
- Game start: 2:35 p.m.
- Elapsed time: 3:08
- Game attendance: 83,818
- Game weather: 63°, light rain, winds E at 5 mph
- Referee: Steve Landis

In the 2004 edition of the Iron Bowl, the Crimson Tide took a 6–0 lead at halftime over favored Auburn, but ultimately fell 21–13 to the Tigers. Alabama took a 6–0 halftime lead on field goals of 42 and 22-yard by Brian Bostick. Auburn responded in the second half with 21 consecutive points to take a 21–6 lead. Touchdowns were scored by Cadillac Williams on a five-yard run, on a 32-yard Jason Campbell pass to Courtney Taylor and on a two-yard Ronnie Brown run. Alabama scored their only touchdown late in the fourth on an 18-yard Spencer Pennington touchdown pass to D. J. Hall to make the final score 21–13 after a failed onside kick.

=== Minnesota ===
Music City Bowl

Team	1	2	3	4	Total
Alabama	7	7	0	2	16
• Minnesota	7	10	3	0	20

- Location: Nashville, Tennessee
- Game start: 11:00 a.m.
- Elapsed time: 3:30
- Game attendance: 66,089
- Game weather: 60°, cloudy, winds SW at 15 mph
- Referee: Jack Cramer

After finishing the regular season with an overall record of 6–5, the Crimson Tide accepted an invitation to play in the Music City Bowl on December 4. Their appearance was the second for Alabama in the game, marked the first all-time meeting against the Minnesota Golden Gophers on the gridiron and a return to postseason play for the Crimson Tide following a two-year bowl ban imposed by the NCAA. Led by running backs Marion Barber III and Laurence Maroney who each rushed for over 100 yards, Minnesota defeated Alabama 20–16.

The Crimson Tide scored first when Spencer Pennington threw a two-yard touchdown pass to Le'Ron McClain for a 7–0 Alabama lead. Minnesota tied the game later in the first on a defensive touchdown. The score happened after Anthony Montgomery forced a Pennington fumble that was recovered in the endzone by Keith Lipka. The Gophers took a 17–7 lead in the second quarter after a five-yard Barber touchdown run and a 27-yard Rhys Lloyd field goal. The Crimson Tide responded with a one-yard McClain touchdown run to cut the Minnesota lead to 17–14 at halftime. The second half was dominated by both defenses with Minnesota only managing to score on a 24-yard Lloyd field goal in the third and Alabama only scoring on a safety in the fourth to make the final score 20–16.

== Coaching staff ==
Name	Position	Seasons at Alabama	Alma mater
Mike Shula	Head coach	2	Alabama (1987)
Chris Ball	Secondary	2	Missouri Western State (1986)
Bob Connelly	Offensive line	2	Texas A&M–Commerce (1994)
Charlie Harbison	Wide receivers	2	Gardner–Webb (1995)
Joe Kines	Defensive coordinator	2	Jacksonville State (1967)
David Rader	Offensive coordinator	2	Tulsa (1980)
Paul Randolph	Defensive line	2	Tennessee–Martin (1990)
Dave Ungerer	Special teams, Tight ends	2	Southern Connecticut State (1980)
Sparky Woods	Running backs	2	Carson–Newman (1976)
Buddy Wyatt	Defensive line	2	TCU (1989)
Gabe Giardina	Student coach	1	Alabama (2004)
