= 2004 Mississippi State Bulldogs football team =

American college football season

2004 Mississippi State Bulldogs football
- Conference: Southeastern Conference
- Western Division
- Record: 3–8 (2–6 SEC)
- Head coach: Sylvester Croom (1st season)
- Offensive coordinator: Woody McCorvey (1st season)
- Offensive scheme: West Coast
- Defensive coordinator: Ellis Johnson (1st season)
- Home stadium: Davis Wade Stadium

2004 Southeastern Conference football standings
	Conf.			Overall
Team	W		L	W		L
Eastern Division
No. 13 Tennessee x	7	–	1	10	–	3
No. 7 Georgia	6	–	2	10	–	2
Florida	4	–	4	7	–	5
South Carolina	4	–	4	6	–	5
Kentucky	1	–	7	2	–	9
Vanderbilt	1	–	7	2	–	9
Western Division
No. 2 Auburn x$	8	–	0	13	–	0
No. 16 LSU	6	–	2	9	–	3
Alabama	3	–	5	6	–	6
Arkansas	3	–	5	5	–	6
Ole Miss	3	–	5	4	–	7
Mississippi State	2	–	6	3	–	8
Championship: Auburn 38, Tennessee 28
$ – BCS representative as conference champion; x – Division champion/co-champions; Rankings from AP Poll

The 2004 Mississippi State Bulldogs football team represented Mississippi State University as a member of the Western Division of the Southern Conference (SEC) during the 2004 NCAA Division I-A football season. Led by first-year head coach Sylvester Croom, the Bulldogs compiled an overall record of 3–8 with a mark of 2–6 in conference play, placing last out of six teams in the SEC's Western Division for the fourth consecutive season. Mississippi State played home games at Davis Wade Stadium in Starkville, Mississippi.

== Schedule ==
Date	Time	Opponent	Site	TV	Result	Attendance
September 4	5:00 pm	Tulane*	Davis Wade Stadium; Starkville, MS	ESPN2	W 28–7	52,114
September 11	11:30 am	No. 18 Auburn	Davis Wade Stadium; Starkville, MS	JPS	L 14–43	51,021
September 18	6:00 pm	No. 15 (I-AA) Maine*	Davis Wade Stadium; Starkville, MS		L 7–9	43,486
September 25	11:30 am	at No. 13 LSU	Tiger Stadium; Baton Rouge, LA (rivalry)	JPS	L 0–51	91,431
October 2	6:00 pm	at Vanderbilt	Vanderbilt Stadium; Nashville TN		L 13–31	27,292
October 9	1:30 pm	UAB*	Davis Wade Stadium; Starkville, MS		L 13–27	32,310
October 23	11:30 am	No. 20 Florida	Davis Wade Stadium; Starkville, MS	JPS	W 38–31	43,170
October 30	1:30 pm	Kentucky	Davis Wade Stadium; Starkville, MS		W 22–7	40,810
November 6	5:30 pm	at Alabama	Bryant–Denny Stadium; Tuscaloosa, AL (rivalry)	ESPN2	L 14–30	82,617
November 20	1:30 pm	Arkansas	Davis Wade Stadium; Starkville, MS	PPV	L 21–24	43,634
November 27	1:00 pm	at Ole Miss	Vaught–Hemingway Stadium; Oxford, MS (Egg Bowl)		L 3–20	55,810
*Non-conference game; Rankings from AP Poll released prior to the game; All times are in Central time
