= Georgia–Tennessee football rivalry =

American college football rivalry

- Georgia Bulldogs Tennessee Volunteers
- First meeting: November 11, 1899; Tennessee, 5–0
- Latest meeting: September 13, 2025; Georgia, 44–41^{OT}
- Next meeting: 2027

Statistics
- Total meetings: 55
- All-time series: Georgia leads 30–23–2
- Largest victory: Tennessee, 46–0 (1936)
- Longest win streak: Georgia, 9 (2017–present); Tennessee, 9 (1989–1999)
- Current win streak: Georgia, 9 (2017–present)

Locations of Georgia and Tennessee

The Georgia–Tennessee football rivalry is an American college football rivalry between the Georgia Bulldogs football team of the University of Georgia and Tennessee Volunteers football team of the University of Tennessee. The series is led by Georgia 30–23–2. Both teams are founding members of the Southeastern Conference (SEC). Georgia and Tennessee have the second and third most wins amongst all pre-expansion SEC football programs, behind only Alabama. The rivalry has never been contested anyplace besides Knoxville, Tennessee or Athens, Georgia, and alternates between the two respective campuses. Games in odd-numbered years are played in Knoxville, and even-numbered years in Athens.

== Series history ==
From 1899 to 1991, UT and UGA met only 21 times before the Southeastern Conference (SEC) expanded to twelve members and split into two divisions of six members each, West and East. UGA held a 10–9–2 series lead in the rivalry before annual play began in 1992. From 1992-2023, the Dawgs and Vols were both in the SEC's Eastern Division and met annually on the football field. The largest margin of victory overall was Tennessee by 46 points in 1936 at Sanford Stadium in Athens in their 46–0 victory. The largest margin of victory for Georgia is by 44 points in 1981 at Sanford Stadium in their 44–0 victory. The longest win streak is a tie between Georgia and Tennessee, with 9; Georgia's 9-game streak from 2017 to 2025 and Tennessee's 9-game streak from 1989 to 1999.

Throughout the 1990s, Tennessee went 9–0 vs Georgia, holding a nine-game win streak. Georgia ended the streak in 2000 under head coach Jim Donnan when they defeated the Volunteers 21–10. In 2001, the Mark Richt era began at Georgia. He led the Bulldogs to wins against the Volunteers in his first three seasons, beginning with a memorable upset in Knoxville in 2001. In 2007, Tennessee defeated Georgia 35–14 to win the tie-breaker for the conference title game. In the 2009 game, the Vols defeated Georgia 45–19 under first and only season under Lane Kiffin. Georgia held a 6–4 advantage over the Volunteers in the 2000s.

In 2010, Derek Dooley became the Tennessee head coach. Throughout his tenure he went 0–3 vs Bulldogs, and Georgia extended a five-game winning streak against Tennessee. Georgia continued their streak until 2015 when Tennessee defeated the Bulldogs 38–31 in Knoxville, under head coach Butch Jones. From 2011 to 2016, every game in the series was decided by eight points or less, including one overtime thriller in 2013. In 2016, Kirby Smart succeeded Mark Richt as Georgia head coach. That year, Tennessee won by a Hail Mary pass with 4 seconds left on the clock. In the 2017 meeting, Georgia defeated Tennessee 41–0 in Knoxville, giving Tennessee its worst home loss since 1905. In 2018, Georgia defeated Tennessee 38–12 in Athens at Sanford Stadium. Georgia's 2019 victory gave UGA the series lead for the first time since Tennessee had taken the lead in 1993. Georgia currently holds a 9-game win streak, their most in series history, after their victory in the 2025 game.

The SEC eliminated divisions beginning with the 2024 season. As part of a two year bridge agreement, the schools continued their annual series for 2024 and 2025, both Georgia victories. Beginning with the 2026 season, Georgia and Tennessee will meet every other season with the Vols visiting Athens in 2027 and the Bulldogs visiting Knoxville in 2029.

== Game results ==
Rankings are from the AP Poll.

Georgia victories	Tennessee victories	Tie games

No.	Date	Location	Winning team		Losing team	
1	November 11, 1899	Knoxville, Tennessee	Tennessee	5	Georgia	0
2	November 7, 1903	Knoxville, Tennessee	Georgia	5	Tennessee	0
3	November 21, 1906	Athens, Georgia	Tie	0	Tie	0
4	October 12, 1907	Athens, Georgia	Tennessee	15	Georgia	0
5	October 24, 1908	Knoxville, Tennessee	Tennessee	10	Georgia	0
6	October 23, 1909	Knoxville, Tennessee	Georgia	3	Tennessee	0
7	October 22, 1910	Athens, Georgia	Georgia	35	Tennessee	3
8	October 21, 1922	Athens, Georgia	Georgia	7	Tennessee	3
9	October 20, 1923	Knoxville, Tennessee	Georgia	17	Tennessee	0
10	November 1, 1924	Athens, Georgia	Georgia	33	Tennessee	3
11	October 31, 1925	Knoxville, Tennessee	Tennessee	12	Georgia	7
12	October 31, 1936	Athens, Georgia	Tennessee	46	Georgia	0
13	October 30, 1937	Knoxville, Tennessee	Tennessee	32	Georgia	0
14	September 14, 1968	Knoxville, Tennessee	Tie	17	Tie	17
15	November 1, 1969	Athens, Georgia	#3 Tennessee	17	#11 Georgia	3
16	November 4, 1972	Athens, Georgia	#13 Tennessee	14	Georgia	0
17	November 3, 1973	Knoxville, Tennessee	Georgia	35	#11 Tennessee	31
18	September 6, 1980	Knoxville, Tennessee	#16 Georgia	16	Tennessee	15
19	September 5, 1981	Athens, Georgia	#10 Georgia	44	Tennessee	0
20	September 3, 1988	Athens, Georgia	#12 Georgia	28	#18 Tennessee	17
21	October 7, 1989	Knoxville, Tennessee	#6 Tennessee	17	Georgia	14
22	September 12, 1992	Athens, Georgia	#20 Tennessee	34	#14 Georgia	31
23	September 11, 1993	Knoxville, Tennessee	#8 Tennessee	38	#22 Georgia	6
24	September 10, 1994	Athens, Georgia	#19 Tennessee	41	#23 Georgia	23
25	September 9, 1995	Knoxville, Tennessee	#8 Tennessee	30	Georgia	27
26	October 12, 1996	Athens, Georgia	#7 Tennessee	29	Georgia	17
27	October 11, 1997	Knoxville, Tennessee	#10 Tennessee	38	#15 Georgia	13
28	October 10, 1998	Athens, Georgia	#4 Tennessee	22	#7 Georgia	3

No.	Date	Location	Winning team		Losing team	
29	October 9, 1999	Knoxville, Tennessee	#6 Tennessee	37	#9 Georgia	20
30	October 7, 2000	Athens, Georgia	#19 Georgia	21	#21 Tennessee	10
31	October 6, 2001	Knoxville, Tennessee	Georgia	26	#6 Tennessee	24
32	October 12, 2002	Athens, Georgia	#6 Georgia	18	#10 Tennessee	13
33	October 11, 2003	Knoxville, Tennessee	#8 Georgia	41	#13 Tennessee	14
34	October 9, 2004	Athens, Georgia	#17 Tennessee	19	#3 Georgia	14
35	October 8, 2005	Knoxville, Tennessee	#5 Georgia	27	#8 Tennessee	14
36	October 7, 2006	Athens, Georgia	#14 Tennessee	51	#9 Georgia	33
37	October 6, 2007	Knoxville, Tennessee	Tennessee	35	#12 Georgia	14
38	October 11, 2008	Athens, Georgia	#10 Georgia	26	Tennessee	14
39	October 10, 2009	Knoxville, Tennessee	Tennessee	45	Georgia	19
40	October 9, 2010	Athens, Georgia	Georgia	41	Tennessee	14
41	October 8, 2011	Knoxville, Tennessee	Georgia	20	Tennessee	12
42	September 29, 2012	Athens, Georgia	#5 Georgia	51	Tennessee	44
43	October 5, 2013	Knoxville, Tennessee	#6 Georgia	34^{OT}	Tennessee	31
44	September 27, 2014	Athens, Georgia	#12 Georgia	35	Tennessee	32
45	October 10, 2015	Knoxville, Tennessee	Tennessee	38	#19 Georgia	31
46	October 1, 2016	Athens, Georgia	#11 Tennessee	34	#25 Georgia	31
47	September 30, 2017	Knoxville, Tennessee	#7 Georgia	41	Tennessee	0
48	September 29, 2018	Athens, Georgia	#2 Georgia	38	Tennessee	12
49	October 5, 2019	Knoxville, Tennessee	#3 Georgia	43	Tennessee	14
50	October 10, 2020	Athens, Georgia	#3 Georgia	44	#14 Tennessee	21
51	November 13, 2021	Knoxville, Tennessee	#1 Georgia	41	Tennessee	17
52	November 5, 2022	Athens, Georgia	#1 Georgia	27	#2 Tennessee	13
53	November 18, 2023	Knoxville, Tennessee	#1 Georgia	38	#18 Tennessee	10
54	November 16, 2024	Athens, Georgia	#12 Georgia	31	#7 Tennessee	17
55	September 13, 2025	Knoxville, Tennessee	#6 Georgia	44^{OT}	#15 Tennessee	41
Series: Georgia leads 30–23–2

=== Results by location ===
As of September 13, 2025

State	City	Games	Georgia victories	Tennessee victories	Ties	Years played
Tennessee	Knoxville	28	15	11	1	1899–present
Georgia	Athens	27	15	12	1	1906-present

== Notable games ==
- 1980: In 1980, Georgia, who trailed early 15–0, rallied back behind Herschel Walker, who, on his first collegiate touchdown, ran right over Tennessee defender Bill Bates. Georgia would go on to win 16–15, their first victory in an undefeated national championship season.
- 1995: In 1995, Georgia had the ball with under two minutes to play in a tie game, 27–27. Georgia then missed a potential game-winning field goal with just over a minute and a half left. Peyton Manning then took the Volunteers to within 40 yards, and Tennessee kicked the game-winning field goal with 10 seconds left to win their 5th game in a row against the Bulldogs, 30–27.
- 2000: In 2000, Georgia quarterback Quincy Carter beat the Volunteers 21–10 in Athens. The victory over Tennessee was Georgia's first win over the Vols since 1988, after 9 straight Tennessee wins. Fans stormed the field at Sanford Stadium in celebration for the only time in school history – taking down the goalposts. Larry Munson, Georgia's radio announcer, said "The athletic department is about to lose about $11,000...we won by 11 points and a lot of praying up here!"
- 2001: In the 2001 game, Tennessee was ranked No. 6 as it faced UGA coach Mark Richt for the first time. The lead was traded multiple times, but Tennessee had seemingly won the game on a 62-yard touchdown pass with only 44 seconds remaining to take a 24–20 lead. Georgia quarterback David Greene would take the Bulldogs down the field and threw a touchdown pass to Verron Haynes with 6 seconds left to upset Tennessee 26–24. Legendary Georgia radio announcer Larry Munson in a famous call exclaimed, "We just stepped on their face with a hobnail boot and broke their nose! We just crushed their face!". The Bulldog win snapped a five game losing streak in Neyland Stadium.
- 2004: In 2004, No. 17 Tennessee ended the back to back SEC Eastern Division Champions 17-game home winning streak with a shocking upset, 19–14. The victory propelled the Volunteers to the SEC Eastern Division Championship, and knocked No. 3 UGA out of the national title. The Vols were a 12 point underdog and coming off a 34–10 loss to Auburn the week before. Tennessee took a 10–0 lead in the first quarter, and went to halftime with a 13–7 lead. Late of the third quarter, the Bulldogs attempted an unsuccessful fake a punt on a 4 and 3, and Tennessee took advantage and took a 19–7 lead. The Bulldogs answered with a rushing touchdown to cut the lead to five. Towards the end of the game Georgia rushed to the Tennessee 19-yard, but time expired giving the Vols the 19–14 victory. Tennessee was the eventual SEC east champions, and lost in the SEC Championship game in a rematch against Auburn, 38–28.

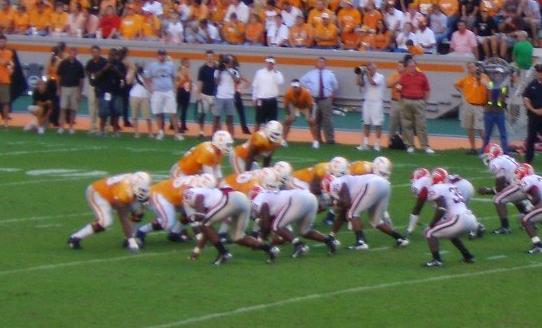
Erik Ainge and the Tennessee Volunteers offense lineup against Georgia.

- 2007: In 2007, unranked Tennessee took an early lead over No. 12 Georgia in Knoxville early, en route to a 35–14 victory. Georgia and Tennessee would finish the season tied for the SEC Eastern Division, but Tennessee's head-to-head victory allowed the Vols to advance to Atlanta for the SEC Championship Game where they were defeated by LSU 21–14. The Bulldogs would finish the season ranked No. 2, the loss preventing them from advancing to the BCS National Championship Game, while Tennessee finished No. 14.
- 2013: In 2013, Georgia jumped to a 17–3 half time lead. In the third quarter of the game Tennessee came back by a block punt for a touchdown, and a couple of touchdowns. With 1:13 left in the game Tennessee scored a touchdown by Rajion Neal to make the score 31–24. With 5 seconds to go Georgia answered back, with Aaron Murray's pass complete to Rantavious Wooten. In overtime Tennessee thought they scored a touchdown, but after review, it was shown to be a fumble by Volunteer player, Pig Howard, causing a touchback and turning the ball over to the Bulldogs. After taking over at the 25 yard line, Georgia ran 3 plays for no yards and lined up for a 42 yard field goal by Marshall Morgan which was good and Georgia won the game 34–31.
- 2015: In 2015, the No. 19 Georgia Bulldogs traveled to Knoxville looking to extend a 5-year winning streak over the Volunteers, but coming off a disheartening 38–10 loss to Alabama at home. After the Bulldogs took a 24–3 lead, the Volunteers scored a touchdown and recovered a fumble on the ensuing kickoff with 3 minutes left until halftime, leading to another Tennessee score. Tennessee took control of the game in the second half outscoring Georgia 21–7. Georgia was rallying late in the 4th quarter down 38–31 when Greyson Lambert launched a long pass right into the waiting arms of wide receiver Reggie Davis only for Davis to drop the game-tying touchdown. The unranked Tennessee Volunteers would hold on and give Coach Butch Jones one of the biggest wins of his career, beating the No. 19 Bulldogs 38–31, and snapping a five-game losing streak. The game would prove costly to Mark Richt. Even though Georgia's only other loss after would be to eventual SEC East champion Florida, Richt would be dismissed as head coach at season's end.
- 2016: The No.25 Bulldogs stormed to a 17–0 lead in the second quarter, but the No. 11 Vols rallied to take their first lead of the game at 28–24 late in the fourth quarter when Georgia quarterback Jacob Eason was sacked and fumbled the ball in the endzone. After an Eason interception and Vols punt, the Bulldogs found themselves at the Vols' 47-yard line with 19 seconds to go. Out of timeouts, Eason launched a deep touchdown pass to receiver Riley Ridley and Georgia regained the lead at 31–28 with 10 seconds left in regulation. However, the Bulldogs were whistled for an unsportsmanlike conduct penalty after the score and were forced to kickoff from their own 20-yard line. After another Georgia penalty, Quarterback Joshua Dobbs heaved a long Hail Mary pass from the Bulldogs' 43-yard line to receiver Jauan Jennings, who caught the pass in the end zone, leading the undefeated Volunteers to the 34–31 win.
- 2017: The undefeated Georgia Bulldogs entered Knoxville, TN seeking revenge for the previous year's defeat by the Tennessee Volunteers. Georgia's Ty McGhee intercepted the first pass of the game as Georgia had a 41–0 victory that doubled as Tennessee's worst home loss in over 100 years, and first shutout since 1994. Georgia QB Jake Fromm had 3 total touchdowns, including a TD pass to Javon Wims and 2 rushing TDs. Georgia controlled the game with running backs Sony Michel, Nick Chubb, and D'Andre Swift.
- 2022: Both teams entered the highly anticipated matchup undefeated, with Tennessee ranked #2 in the AP Poll, but #1 in the College Football Playoff Rankings, and Georgia ranked #1 in the AP Poll, but #3 in the College Football Playoff Rankings. With College Gameday broadcast from Athens in the morning, Georgia dominated Tennessee, leading 24–6 at halftime and winning 27–13 on the way to the Bulldogs second straight national championship.

== In popular culture ==
The Georgia–Tennessee rivalry is alluded to in country singer Megan Moroney's single "Tennessee Orange", in which Moroney sings from the point of view of a girl, who grew up a Georgia native and a Bulldogs fan, dating and falling in love with a boy who attended rival Tennessee, especially with the hook "In Georgia they'd call it a sin/I'm wearing Tennessee Orange for him."

== See also ==
- List of NCAA college football rivalry games
