= 2004 Florida Gators football team =

American college football season

2004 Florida Gators football

Peach Bowl, L 10–27 vs. Miami (FL)
- Conference: Southeastern Conference
- Eastern Division

Ranking
- Coaches: No. 25
- Record: 7–5 (4–4 SEC)
- Head coach: Ron Zook (3rd season; regular season); Charlie Strong (interim, bowl game)
- Offensive coordinator: Larry Fedora (1st season)
- Offensive scheme: Spread
- Defensive coordinator: Charlie Strong (2nd season)
- Base defense: 4–3
- Captains: Channing Crowder; Mike Degory; Ciatrick Fason; Travis Harris
- Home stadium: Ben Hill Griffin Stadium

2004 Southeastern Conference football standings
	Conf.			Overall
Team	W		L	W		L
Eastern Division
No. 13 Tennessee x	7	–	1	10	–	3
No. 7 Georgia	6	–	2	10	–	2
Florida	4	–	4	7	–	5
South Carolina	4	–	4	6	–	5
Kentucky	1	–	7	2	–	9
Vanderbilt	1	–	7	2	–	9
Western Division
No. 2 Auburn x$	8	–	0	13	–	0
No. 16 LSU	6	–	2	9	–	3
Alabama	3	–	5	6	–	6
Arkansas	3	–	5	5	–	6
Ole Miss	3	–	5	4	–	7
Mississippi State	2	–	6	3	–	8
Championship: Auburn 38, Tennessee 28
$ – BCS representative as conference champion; x – Division champion/co-champions; Rankings from AP Poll

The 2004 Florida Gators football team represented the University of Florida as a member of the Eastern Division in the Southeastern Conference (SEC) during the 2004 NCAA Division I-A football season. Led by Ron Zook in his third and final season as head coach, the Gators compiled an overall record of 7–5 with a mark of 4–4 in conference play, tying for third place in the SEC's Eastern Division. Florida was invited to the Peach Bowl, where the Gators lost to the Miami Hurricanes. The team played home games at Ben Hill Griffin Stadium on the university's Gainesville, Florida campus.

Zook was fired after Florida's loss to Mississippi State in October 2004, but coached the team through the remainder of the regular season before leaving to become the head football coach at the University of Illinois Urbana-Champaign. Florida's defensive coordinator, Charlie Strong, was appointed interim head coach for the team's bowl game.

== Schedule ==
Date	Opponent	Rank	Site	TV	Result	Attendance
September 11	Eastern Michigan*	No. 11	Ben Hill Griffin Stadium; Gainesville, FL	PPV	W 49–10	90,009
September 18	at No. 13 Tennessee	No. 11	Neyland Stadium; Knoxville, TN (rivalry)	CBS	L 28–30	109,061
September 25	Kentucky	No. 16	Ben Hill Griffin Stadium; Gainesville, FL (rivalry)	ESPN2	W 20–3	89,741
October 2	Arkansas	No. 16	Ben Hill Griffin Stadium; Gainesville, FL	CBS	W 45–30	90,014
October 9	No. 24 LSU	No. 12	Ben Hill Griffin Stadium; Gainesville, FL (rivalry)	ESPN	L 21–24	90,377
October 16	Middle Tennessee*	No. 22	Ben Hill Griffin Stadium; Gainesville, FL	PPV	W 52–16	90,018
October 23	at Mississippi State	No. 19	Davis Wade Stadium; Starkville, MS	JPS	L 31–38	43,170
October 30	vs. No. 7 Georgia		Alltel Stadium; Jacksonville, FL (rivalry)	CBS	L 24–31	84,753
November 6	at Vanderbilt		Vanderbilt Stadium; Nashville, TN	PPV	W 34–17	32,716
November 13	South Carolina^{†}		Ben Hill Griffin Stadium; Gainesville, FL	ESPN2	W 48–14	90,294
November 20	at No. 10 Florida State*		Doak Campbell Stadium; Tallahassee, FL (rivalry)	ESPN	W 20–13	84,223
December 31	vs. No. 14 Miami (FL)*	No. 19	Georgia Dome; Atlanta, GA (Peach Bowl, rivalry)	ESPN	L 10–27	69,322
*Non-conference game; ^{†}Homecoming; Rankings from AP Poll released prior to the game

== Game summaries ==
=== Eastern Michigan ===
Team	1	2	3	4	Total
Eastern Michigan	3	7	0	10	20
• Florida	7	21	21	0	49

- Date: September 11
- Location: Ben Hill Griffin Stadium, Gainesville, Florida

=== Tennessee ===
Team	1	2	3	4	Total
Florida	7	14	0	7	28
• Tennessee	7	7	0	16	30

- Date: September 18
- Location: Neyland Stadium, Knoxville, Tennessee

=== Kentucky ===
Team	1	2	3	4	Total
Kentucky	3	0	0	0	3
• Florida	3	7	3	7	20

- Date: September 25
- Location: Ben Hill Griffin Stadium, Gainesville, Florida

=== Arkansas ===
Team	1	2	3	4	Total
Arkansas	0	7	7	16	30
• Florida	7	28	3	7	45

- Date: October 2
- Location: Ben Hill Griffin Stadium, Gainesville, Florida

=== LSU ===
Team	1	2	3	4	Total
• LSU	0	14	3	7	24
Florida	14	7	0	0	21

- Date: October 9
- Location: Ben Hill Griffin Stadium, Gainesville, Florida

=== Middle Tennessee ===
Team	1	2	3	4	Total
Middle Tennessee	3	10	3	0	16
• Florida	17	14	21	0	52

- Date: October 16
- Location: Ben Hill Griffin Stadium, Gainesville, Florida

The match with MTSU was intended to be the season opener for the Gators, but was canceled and rescheduled because of Hurricane Frances. This left the Gators without a regular-season bye week.

=== Mississippi State ===
Team	1	2	3	4	Total
Florida	0	14	10	7	31
• Mississippi St	7	10	7	14	38

- Date: October 23
- Location: Davis Wade Stadium, Starkville, Mississippi

Following this loss, head coach Ron Zook was fired, but allowed to coach the remainder of the season.

=== Georgia ===
Team	1	2	3	4	Total
Florida	0	0	7	10	17
• Georgia	7	7	3	7	24

- Date: October 30
- Location: Alltel Stadium, Jacksonville, Florida

=== Vanderbilt ===
Team	1	2	3	4	Total
• Florida	7	7	0	10	24
Vanderbilt	10	7	0	0	17

- Date: November 6
- Location: Vanderbilt Stadium, Nashville, Tennessee

=== South Carolina ===
Team	1	2	3	4	Total
South Carolina	7	0	0	7	14
• Florida	0	21	10	17	48

- Date: November 13
- Location: Ben Hill Griffin Stadium, Gainesville, Florida

=== Florida State ===
Florida Gators at #8 Florida State Seminoles

Quarter	1	2	3	4	Total
Florida	7	3	0	10	20
Florida St	0	3	0	10	13

at Doak Campbell Stadium • Tallahassee, Florida

- Date: November 20
- Game time: 7:45 EDT
- Game weather: 68 °F (20 °C) • Wind S 10 miles per hour (16 km/h; 8.7 kn) to 12 miles per hour (19 km/h; 10 kn)
- Game attendance: 84,223
- Referee: Steve Shaw
- Gatorzone.com

Game information

Florida

- Chris Leak
  19/39, 231 Yds, TD, INT
- Ciatrick Fason
  24 Rush, 103 Yds, TD
- Chad Jackson
  3 Rec, 65 Yds, TD

Florida St

- Will Sexton
  14/32, 164 Yds, INT
- Lorenzo Booker
  5 Rush, 25 Yds
- Chauncey Stovall
  11 Rec, 181 Yds, TD

Ron Zook's last game as head coach of the Florida Gators and spoiled the dedication of the field for Bobby Bowden.

Scoring summary

Quarter	Time	Drive			Team	Scoring information	Score	
Quarter	Time	Plays	Yards	TOP	Team	Scoring information	FLA	FSU
1	7:56	14	97	4:46	Florida	Chad Jackson 13-yard touchdown reception from Chris Leak, Matt Leach kick good	7	0
2	9:01	10	59	3:25	Florida	38-yard field goal by Matt Leach	10	0
2	0:17	8	32	2:58	Florida St	20-yard field goal by Gary Cismesia	10	3
4	11:51	9	74	3:05	Florida	21-yard field goal by Matt Leach	13	3
4	8:30	7	80	3:21	Florida St	Chauncey Stovall 27-yard touchdown reception from Chris Rix, Xavier Beitia kick good	13	10
4	4:59	9	80	3:26	Florida	Ciatrick Fason 8-yard touchdown run, Matt Leach kick good	20	10
4	3:48	4	-10	0:57	Florida St	52-yard field goal by Xavier Beitia	20	13
"TOP" = time of possession. For other American football terms, see Glossary of American football.							20	13

=== Peach Bowl ===
Team	1	2	3	4	Total
Florida	0	3	7	0	10
• Miami (FL)	7	10	7	3	27

- Date: December 31
- Location: Georgia Dome, Atlanta

Defensive coordinator Charlie Strong was interim head coach for the bowl game.

== Coaching staff ==
- Ron Zook – head coach
- Jerry "Red" Anderson – defensive line coach
- Dan Disch – secondary coach
- Dwayne Dixon – assistant head coach / inside receivers coach
- Larry Fedora – offensive coordinator / receivers coach
- Mike Locksley – running backs coach / recruiting coordinator
- Bill Miller – associate head coach / linebackers coach
- Charlie Strong – defensive coordinator/ interim head coach
- Joe Wickline – offensive line coach / running game coordinator
- Ed Zaunbrecher – quarterbacks coach

== Players drafted into the NFL ==
Round	Pick	Player	Position	NFL club
3	70	Channing Crowder	LB	Miami Dolphins
4	112	Ciatrick Fason	RB	Minnesota Vikings
7	218	Reynaldo Hill	CB	Tennessee Titans

== Bibliography ==
- 2009 Southeastern Conference Football Media Guide, Florida Year-by-Year Records, Southeastern Conference, Birmingham, Alabama, p. 60 (2009).
- Carlson, Norm, University of Florida Football Vault: The History of the Florida Gators, Whitman Publishing, LLC, Atlanta, Georgia (2007). ISBN 0-7948-2298-3.
