= Justin Geisinger =

American football player (born 1982)

No. 73, 68
- Position: Guard

Personal information
- Born: May 24, 1982 (age 44); Pittsburgh, Pennsylvania, U.S.
- Listed height: 6 ft 2 in (1.88 m)
- Listed weight: 317 lb (144 kg)

Career information
- High school: Mt. Lebanon (PA)
- College: Vanderbilt
- NFL draft: 2005: 6th round, 197th overall pick

Career history
- Buffalo Bills (2005); Tennessee Titans (2006); Washington Redskins (2007–2008); Carolina Panthers (2009)*
- * Offseason or practice squad member only

Awards and highlights
- Second-team All-SEC (2004)

Career NFL statistics
- Games played: 6
- Stats at Pro Football Reference

Justin Geisinger (born May 24, 1982) is an American former professional football player who was a guard in the National Football League (NFL). He was selected by the Buffalo Bills in the sixth round of the 2005 NFL draft with the 197th overall pick. He played college football for the Vanderbilt Commodores. At Vanderbilt, he was a four-year starter at left tackle, a two-year captain, and an all-SEC selection and Outland Trophy nominee in his senior year. He was named a strength all-American for benching 600 pounds in his final year at Vanderbilt, an SEC record at the time.

Geisinger has also played for the Tennessee Titans and Washington Redskins.

After finishing out his NFL career in 2010, he became the offensive line coach and strength coach at Pope John Paul II High School in Hendersonville, TN. He was promoted to offensive coordinator in 2014 and was the head coach for seven seasons from 2015 to 2021.

He is now the head football coach at Franklin Road Academy in Nashville, beginning with the 2022 season.
