= 2004 Ole Miss Rebels football team =

American college football season

2004 Ole Miss Rebels football
- Conference: Southeastern Conference
- Western Division
- Record: 4–7 (3–5 SEC)
- Head coach: David Cutcliffe (6th season)
- Offensive coordinator: John Latina (5th season)
- Offensive scheme: Pro-style
- Defensive coordinator: Chuck Driesbach (3rd season)
- Base defense: 3–4
- Home stadium: Vaught–Hemingway Stadium

2004 Southeastern Conference football standings
	Conf.			Overall
Team	W		L	W		L
Eastern Division
No. 13 Tennessee x	7	–	1	10	–	3
No. 7 Georgia	6	–	2	10	–	2
Florida	4	–	4	7	–	5
South Carolina	4	–	4	6	–	5
Kentucky	1	–	7	2	–	9
Vanderbilt	1	–	7	2	–	9
Western Division
No. 2 Auburn x$	8	–	0	13	–	0
No. 16 LSU	6	–	2	9	–	3
Alabama	3	–	5	6	–	6
Arkansas	3	–	5	5	–	6
Ole Miss	3	–	5	4	–	7
Mississippi State	2	–	6	3	–	8
Championship: Auburn 38, Tennessee 28
$ – BCS representative as conference champion; x – Division champion/co-champions; Rankings from AP Poll

The 2004 Ole Miss Rebels football team represented the University of Mississippi during the 2004 NCAA Division I-A football season. They participated in the Southeastern Conference in the Western Division. The team played their home games at Vaught–Hemingway Stadium in Oxford, Mississippi. They were coached by head coach David Cutcliffe.

The Rebels finished the season with a record of 4–7.

== Schedule ==
Date	Time	Opponent	Site	TV	Result	Attendance
September 4	6:00 pm	Memphis*	Vaught–Hemingway Stadium; Oxford, MS (rivalry)		L 13–20	61,112
September 11	8:00 pm	at Alabama	Bryant–Denny Stadium; Tuscaloosa, AL (rivalry)	ESPN2	L 7–28	83,083
September 18	11:30 am	Vanderbilt	Vaught–Hemingway Stadium; Oxford, MS (rivalry)		W 26–23 ^{OT}	55,824
September 25	2:00 pm	at Wyoming*	War Memorial Stadium; Laramie, WY	PPV	L 32–37	22,331
October 2	1:00 pm	Arkansas State*^{†}	Vaught–Hemingway Stadium; Oxford, MS		W 28–21	54,676
October 9	12:00 pm	at No. 25 South Carolina	Williams–Brice Stadium; Columbia, SC	PPV	W 31–28	79,100
October 16	8:00 pm	No. 13 Tennessee	Vaught–Hemingway Stadium; Oxford, MS (rivalry)	ESPN2	L 17–21	62,028
October 30	6:45 pm	No. 3 Auburn	Vaught–Hemingway Stadium; Oxford, MS (rivalry)	ESPN	L 14–35	60,787
November 13	11:30 am	at Arkansas	Donald W. Reynolds Razorback Stadium; Fayetteville, AR (rivalry)	JPS	L 3–35	63,474
November 20	7:00 pm	at No. 14 LSU	Tiger Stadium; Baton Rouge, LA (rivalry)	PPV	L 24–27	91,413
November 27	1:00 pm	Mississippi State	Vaught–Hemingway Stadium; Oxford, MS (Egg Bowl)		W 20–3	55,810
*Non-conference game; ^{†}Homecoming; Rankings from AP Poll released prior to the game; All times are in Central time

== Personnel ==
2004 Ole Miss Rebels football team roster
Players
Coaches
Offense

Pos.	#	Name	Class
		Taye Biddle
QB		Ethan Flatt
		Mario Hill
RB		Brandon Jacobs
		Webb Lewis
		Vashon Pearson
QB		Micheal Spurlock

Defense

Pos.	#	Name	Class
		Nate Banks
		Charles Clark
		Andrew Galbierz
		Bryan Lester
		Eric Oliver
		Kelvin Robinson
LB		Patrick Willis

Special teams

Pos.	#	Name	Class
K		Jonathan Nichols

Head coach

- David Cutcliffe

Coordinators/assistant coaches

- Jay Hopson (DB/RC)

Legend

- (C) Team captain
- (S) Suspended
- (I) Ineligible
- Injured
- Redshirt
