= 2004 LSU Tigers football team =

American college football season

2004 LSU Tigers football

Capital One Bowl, L 25–30 vs. Iowa
- Conference: Southeastern Conference
- Western Division

Ranking
- Coaches: No. 16
- AP: No. 16
- Record: 9–3 (6–2 SEC)
- Head coach: Nick Saban (5th season)
- Offensive coordinator: Jimbo Fisher (5th season)
- Offensive scheme: Pro-style
- Defensive coordinator: Will Muschamp (3rd season)
- Base defense: 4–3
- Home stadium: Tiger Stadium

2004 Southeastern Conference football standings
	Conf.			Overall
Team	W		L	W		L
Eastern Division
No. 13 Tennessee x	7	–	1	10	–	3
No. 7 Georgia	6	–	2	10	–	2
Florida	4	–	4	7	–	5
South Carolina	4	–	4	6	–	5
Kentucky	1	–	7	2	–	9
Vanderbilt	1	–	7	2	–	9
Western Division
No. 2 Auburn x$	8	–	0	13	–	0
No. 16 LSU	6	–	2	9	–	3
Alabama	3	–	5	6	–	6
Arkansas	3	–	5	5	–	6
Ole Miss	3	–	5	4	–	7
Mississippi State	2	–	6	3	–	8
Championship: Auburn 38, Tennessee 28
$ – BCS representative as conference champion; x – Division champion/co-champions; Rankings from AP Poll

The 2004 LSU Tigers football team represented Louisiana State University in the 2004 NCAA Division I-A football season. Coached by Nick Saban in his final season coaching at LSU, the Tigers played their home games at Tiger Stadium in Baton Rouge, Louisiana and were the defending BCS National Champions. The team finished with a 9–3 record and an appearance in the Capital One Bowl against Iowa.

== Schedule ==
Date	Time	Opponent	Rank	Site	TV	Result	Attendance
September 4	5:00 p.m.	Oregon State*	No. 4	Tiger Stadium; Baton Rouge, LA (College GameDay)	ESPN	W 22–21 ^{OT}	91,828
September 11	7:00 p.m.	Arkansas State*	No. 6	Tiger Stadium; Baton Rouge, LA	PPV	W 53–3	91,611
September 18	2:30 p.m.	at No. 14 Auburn	No. 5	Jordan–Hare Stadium; Auburn, AL (Tiger Bowl)	CBS	L 9–10	87,451
September 25	11:30 a.m.	Mississippi State	No. 13	Tiger Stadium; Baton Rouge, LA (rivalry)	JPS	W 51–0	91,431
October 2	2:30 p.m.	at No. 3 Georgia	No. 13	Sanford Stadium; Athens, GA	CBS	L 16–45	92,746
October 9	6:45 p.m.	at No. 12 Florida	No. 24	Ben Hill Griffin Stadium; Gainesville, FL (rivalry)	ESPN	W 24–21	90,377
October 23	7:00 p.m.	Troy*^{†}	No. 18	Tiger Stadium; Baton Rouge, LA	PPV	W 24–20	89,493
October 30	7:00 p.m.	Vanderbilt	No. 19	Tiger Stadium; Baton Rouge, LA	PPV	W 24–7	90,825
November 13	6:45 p.m.	Alabama	No. 17	Tiger Stadium; Baton Rouge, LA (rivalry)	ESPN	W 26–10	91,861
November 20	7:00 p.m.	Ole Miss	No. 14	Tiger Stadium; Baton Rouge, LA (Magnolia Bowl)	PPV	W 27–24	91,413
November 26	1:30 p.m.	at Arkansas	No. 14	War Memorial Stadium; Little Rock, AR (Battle for the Golden Boot)	CBS	W 43–14	55,829
January 1, 2005	12:00 p.m.	vs. No. 11 Iowa*	No. 12	Citrus Bowl; Orlando, FL (Capital One Bowl)	ABC	L 25–30	70,229
*Non-conference game; ^{†}Homecoming; Rankings from AP Poll released prior to the game; All times are in Central time

2004 LSU Tigers Football Schedule

== Roster ==
2004 LSU Tigers football team roster
Players
Coaches
Offense

Pos.	#	Name	Class
RB	10	Joseph Addai	Jr
WR	80	Dwayne Bowe	So
RB	22	Alley Broussard	So
QB	15	Matt Flynn	Fr
WR	5	Skyler Green	Jr
QB	12	Marcus Randall	Sr
QB	2	JaMarcus Russell	So
OT	76	Andrew Whitworth	Jr

Defense

Pos.	#	Name	Class
CB	29	Travis Daniels	Sr
DE	84	Marcus Spears	Sr
CB	13	Corey Webster	Sr

Special teams

Pos.	#	Name	Class
K	41	Chris Jackson	So

Head coach

- Nick Saban

Coordinators/assistant coaches

- Jimbo Fisher – Offensive Coordinator and Quarterbacks
- Derek Dooley - Running Backs/Special Teams Coordinator
- Stacy Searels - Offensive Line
- Bobby Williams - Wide Receivers
- Leroy Ryals - Tight Ends
- Will Muschamp – Defensive Coordinator
- Mike Collins - Linebackers
- Travis Jones - Defensive Line
- Kirby Smart - Defensive Backs
- Chad Walker - Defensive Graduate Assistant
- Jason Woodman - Graduate Assistant
- Roy Anderson - Graduate Assistant
- Bo Davis – Strength and Conditioning assistant
- Scott Cochran – Strength and Conditioning assistant

Legend

- (C) Team captain
- (S) Suspended
- (I) Ineligible
- Injured
- Redshirt

== Game summaries ==
=== Oregon State ===
Oregon State at #4 LSU

Team	1	2	3	4	OT	Total
Beavers	6	3	6	0	6	21
• Tigers	0	0	7	8	7	22

- Date: September 4
- Location: Tiger Stadium
- Game start: 5:00 p.m. CST
- Elapsed time: 3:44
- Game attendance: 91,828
- Game weather: Overcast; 89 °F (32 °C); wind 8 mph (13 km/h) NE
- Referee: Jay Vines
- Television network: ESPN

Scoring summary
Q1	12:08	ORST	Gillett 6 yard pass from Anderson (kick failed)	ORST 6–0
Q2	1:35	ORST	Serna 40 yard field goal	ORST 9–0
Q3	5:41	LSU	Green 16 yard pass from Russell (Jackson kick)	ORST 9–7
Q3	0:48	ORST	Wheat-Brown 4 yard pass from Anderson (kick failed)	ORST 15–7
Q4	1:05	LSU	Bowe 38 yard pass from Randall (Russell run)	Tie 15–15
OT		LSU	Randall 5 yard run (Jackson kick)	LSU 22–15
OT		ORST	Newton 19 yard pass from Anderson (kick failed)	LSU 22–21

=== At No. 14 Auburn ===
#5 LSU at #14 Auburn

Team	1	2	3	4	Total
No. 5 Tigers	6	3	0	0	9
• No. 14 Tigers	3	0	0	7	10

- Date: September 18
- Location: Jordan–Hare Stadium
- Game start: 3:30 p.m. EDT

Scoring summary
1	10:00	LSU	Dwayne Bowe 9-yard pass from Marcus Randall (Gaudet kick failed)	LSU 6–0
1	2:45	Auburn	John Vaughn 29-yard field goal	LSU 6–3
2	13:54	LSU	Chris Jackson 42-yard field goal	LSU 9–3
4	2:00	Auburn	Courtney Taylor 16-yard pass from Jason Campbell (Vaughn kick)	Auburn 10–9

=== At No. 12 Florida ===
#24 LSU at #12 Florida

Team	1	2	3	4	Total
• No. 24 Tigers	0	14	3	7	24
No. 12 Gators	14	7	0	0	21

- Date: October 9
- Location: Ben Hill Griffin Stadium, Gainesville, Florida

=== Alabama ===
Alabama at #17 LSU

Team	1	2	3	4	Total
Crimson Tide	7	3	0	0	10
• No. 17 Tigers	0	6	7	13	26

- Location: Baton Rouge, Louisiana
- Game start: 6:47 p.m.
- Elapsed time: 3:01
- Game attendance: 91,861
- Game weather: 55 °F (13 °C), clear, winds N at 6 mph (9.7 km/h)
- Referee: Penn Wagers

=== Vs. No. 11 Iowa (Capital One Bowl) ===
#11 LSU (9–2) vs. #12 Iowa (9–2)
Capital One Bowl

Team	1	2	3	4	Total
No. 12 Tigers	0	12	0	13	25
• No. 11 Hawkeyes	7	7	3	13	30

- Date: January 1
- Location: Florida Citrus Bowl • Orlando, Florida
- Game start: 1:00 p.m. EST
- Game attendance: 70,229
- Game weather: 75 °F (24 °C), Mostly Sunny
- Referee: Hal Dowden
- TV announcers (ABC): Gary Thorne (Play-by-Play), Ed Cunningham (Analyst), Jerry Punch (Sidelines)

Scoring summary
1	12:42	Iowa	Clinton Solomon 57-yard pass from Drew Tate (Kyle Schlicher kick)	Iowa 7–0
2	14:51	LSU	Chris Jackson 29-yard field goal	Iowa 7–3
2	9:26	LSU	Chris Jackson 47-yard field goal	Iowa 7–6
2	1:04	Iowa	Punt blocked, recovered by Sean Considine, advanced for a touchdown (Kyle Schlicher kick)	Iowa 14–6
2	0:38	LSU	Alley Broussard 74-yard run (Chris Jackson missed PAT)	Iowa 14–12
3	9:59	Iowa	Kyle Schlicher 19-yard field goal	Iowa 17–12
4	12:48	Iowa	Marques Simmons 4-yard run (Kyle Schlicher kick)	Iowa 24–12
4	8:21	LSU	Skyler Green 22-yard pass from JaMarcus Russell (Chris Jackson kick)	Iowa 24–19
4	0:46	LSU	Skyler Green 3-yard pass from JaMarcus Russell (Two-point attempt failed)	LSU 25–24
4	0:00	Iowa	Warren Holloway 56-yard pass from Drew Tate	Iowa 30–25

== LSU Tigers in the 2005 NFL draft ==
Player	Position	Round	Pick	Overall	NFL team
Marcus Spears	Defensive end	1	20	20	Dallas Cowboys
Corey Webster	Defensive back	2	11	43	New York Giants
Travis Daniels	Defensive back	4	3	104	Miami Dolphins
