= 2004 SEC Championship Game =

- Conference Championship
- 2004 SEC Championship logo.
Auburn Tigers	Tennessee Volunteers
(11–0)	(9–2)
38	28
Head coach: Tommy Tuberville	Head coach: Phillip Fulmer
AP / Coaches / BCS; 3 / 3 / 3	AP / Coaches / BCS; 15 / 15 / 15
	1	2	3	4	Total
Auburn	14	7	7	10	38
Tennessee	7	0	14	7	28
- Date: December 4, 2004
- Season: 2004
- Stadium: Georgia Dome
- Location: Atlanta, Georgia
- MVP: QB Jason Campbell, Auburn
- Favorite: Auburn by 14½
- National anthem: Auburn University Marching Band; Pride of the Southland Band
- Referee: Steve Landis
- Halftime show: Auburn University Marching Band; Pride of the Southland Band
- Attendance: 74,892

United States TV coverage
- Network: CBS
- Announcers: Verne Lundquist (play-by-play); Todd Blackledge (color); Tracy Wolfson (sideline)

2004 Southeastern Conference football standings
	Conf.			Overall
Team	W		L	W		L
Eastern Division
No. 13 Tennessee x	7	–	1	10	–	3
No. 7 Georgia	6	–	2	10	–	2
Florida	4	–	4	7	–	5
South Carolina	4	–	4	6	–	5
Kentucky	1	–	7	2	–	9
Vanderbilt	1	–	7	2	–	9
Western Division
No. 2 Auburn x$	8	–	0	13	–	0
No. 16 LSU	6	–	2	9	–	3
Alabama	3	–	5	6	–	6
Arkansas	3	–	5	5	–	6
Ole Miss	3	–	5	4	–	7
Mississippi State	2	–	6	3	–	8
Championship: Auburn 38, Tennessee 28
$ – BCS representative as conference champion; x – Division champion/co-champions; Rankings from AP Poll

The 2004 SEC Championship Game was played on December 4, 2004, in the Georgia Dome in Atlanta. The game matched SEC Western Division champion Auburn against SEC Eastern Division champion Tennessee. The game was a 38–28 victory for Auburn.

== Game summary ==
=== Scoring summary ===
Scoring summary

Quarter	Time	Drive			Team	Scoring information	Score	
Quarter	Time	Plays	Yards	TOP	Team	Scoring information	AUB	TENN
1	13:36	4	86	1:19	AUB	Fumble recovery returned 86 yards for touchdown by Cole Bennett, John Vaughn kick good	7	0
1	8:42	9	67	2:34	AUB	Carnnell Williams 5-yard touchdown run, John Vaughn kick good	14	0
1	0:04	4	36	7:19	TENN	Cedric Houston 1-yard touchdown run, James Wilhoit kick good	14	7
2	9:20	10	80	1:21	AUB	Courtney Taylor 7-yard touchdown reception from Jason Campbell, John Vaughn kick good	21	7
3	9:45	3	19	3:49	TENN	Robert Meachem 21-yard touchdown reception from Rick Clausen, James Wilhoit kick good	21	14
3	6:18	1	80	6:18	TENN	Gerald Riggs 80-yard touchdown run, James Wilhoit kick good	21	21
3	3:53	6	85	2:06	AUB	Devin Aromashodu 53-yard touchdown reception from Jason Campbell, John Vaughn kick good	28	21
4	11:50	11	39	4:39	AUB	22-yard field goal by John Vaughn	31	21
4	14:40	5	80	10:15	TENN	Gerald Riggs 9-yard touchdown run, James Wilhoit kick good	31	28
4	7:03	6	80	2:06	AUB	Ben Obomanu 43-yard touchdown reception from Jason Campbell, John Vaughn kick good	38	28
"TOP" = time of possession. For other American football terms, see Glossary of American football.							38	28

=== Game statistics ===
	1	2	3	4	Total
No. 3 Tigers	14	7	7	10	38
No. 15 Vols	7	0	14	7	28

Statistics	Auburn	Tennessee
First downs	31	9
Plays–yards	86–559	44–297
Rushes–yards	185	228
Passing yards	379	69
Passing: comp–att–int	27–36–1	8–20–0
Time of possession	24:10	12:30

Team	Category	Player	Statistics
Auburn	Passing	Jason Campbell	27/35, 374 yds, 3 TD, 1 INT
Auburn	Rushing	Cadillac Williams	19 car, 100 yds, 1 TD
Auburn	Receiving	Courtney Taylor	6 rec, 111 yds, 1 TD
Tennessee	Passing	Rick Clausen	8/20, 69 yds, 1 TD
Tennessee	Rushing	Gerald Riggs	11 car, 182 yds, 2 TD
Tennessee	Receiving	Robert Meachem	1 rec, 17 yds, 1 TD
