= Rick Clausen =

American football player and coach (born 1982)

Westlake High School
- Title: Head Coach

Personal information
- Born: June 29, 1982 (age 44); Thousand Oaks, California, U.S.
- Listed height: 6 ft 3 in (1.91 m)
- Listed weight: 210 lb (95 kg)

Career information
- High school: William Howard Taft (Woodland Hills, California)
- College: Tennessee
- NFL draft: 2005: undrafted

Career history
- Calabasas (CA) HS (2015–2017) Offensive coordinator quarterbacks coach; Bishop Alemany (CA) HS (2018–2024) Offensive coordinator quarterbacks coach; Westlake (CA) HS (2025-Present) Head coach

Awards and highlights
- SBC Cotton Bowl Classic Offensive MVP (2005)

Richard James Clausen (born June 29, 1982) is an American football coach and former player who played college football for Louisiana State University and the University of Tennessee. He is the current head coach at Westlake High School in Los Angeles.

== College career ==
Clausen initially started his college football career at LSU under then-head coach Nick Saban. In 2001, he redshirted as Rohan Davey was the established starter. In 2002, he played in three games, starting the 2002 game against Ole Miss. At the end of the 2002 season, he transferred to Tennessee, where he walked on to the football team as a backup quarterback, sitting out the 2003 season under the NCAA transfer rules. In the 2004 season under head coach Phillip Fulmer, he shared the quarterback job with Erik Ainge and Brent Schaeffer. He was 81 of 136 for 949 passing yards, eight touchdowns, and five interceptions. In the 2005 season, he and Ainge continued to share time. He was 120 of 209 for 1,441 passing yards, six touchdowns, and six interceptions. Clausen went undrafted in the 2005 NFL draft.

== Personal life ==
His older brother, Casey, also played college football for Tennessee in 2000–2003 and was the head football coach at Bishop Alemany High School. He currently serves as his assistant coach at Westlake High. His youngest brother, Jimmy, formerly played quarterback for Notre Dame and the Carolina Panthers of the NFL.
