= List of Sun Belt Conference football standings =

The Sun Belt Conference first sponsored football in 2001. This is a list of its annual standings since establishment.

== Sun Belt Conference standings ==
2001 Sun Belt Conference football standings
	Conf.			Overall
Team	W		L	W		L
North Texas +	5	–	1	5	–	7
Middle Tennessee +	5	–	1	8	–	3
New Mexico State	4	–	2	5	–	7
Louisiana–Lafayette	2	–	4	3	–	8
Arkansas State	2	–	4	2	–	9
Louisiana–Monroe	2	–	4	2	–	9
Idaho	1	–	5	1	–	10
+ – Conference co-champions

2002 Sun Belt Conference football standings
	Conf.			Overall
Team	W		L	W		L
North Texas $	6	–	0	8	–	5
New Mexico State	5	–	1	7	–	5
Arkansas State	3	–	3	6	–	7
Middle Tennessee	2	–	4	4	–	8
Louisiana–Lafayette	2	–	4	3	–	9
Louisiana–Monroe	2	–	4	3	–	9
Idaho	1	–	5	2	–	10
$ – Conference champion

2003 Sun Belt Conference football standings
	Conf.			Overall
Team	W		L	W		L
North Texas $	7	–	0	9	–	4
Louisiana–Lafayette	3	–	2	4	–	8
Arkansas State	3	–	3	5	–	7
Middle Tennessee	3	–	3	4	–	8
Utah State	3	–	3	3	–	9
Idaho	3	–	4	3	–	9
New Mexico State	2	–	5	3	–	9
Louisiana–Monroe	1	–	5	1	–	11
$ – Conference champion

2004 Sun Belt Conference football standings
	Conf.			Overall
Team	W		L	W		L
North Texas $	7	–	0	7	–	5
Troy State	4	–	2	7	–	5
New Mexico State	3	–	2	5	–	6
Middle Tennessee	4	–	4	5	–	6
Louisiana–Monroe	3	–	3	5	–	6
Arkansas State	3	–	4	3	–	8
Louisiana–Lafayette	2	–	5	4	–	7
Utah State	2	–	5	3	–	8
Idaho	2	–	5	3	–	9
$ – Conference champion

2005 Sun Belt Conference football standings
	Conf.			Overall
Team	W		L	W		L
Arkansas State +	5	–	2	6	–	6
Louisiana–Lafayette +	5	–	2	6	–	5
Louisiana–Monroe +	5	–	2	5	–	6
Middle Tennessee	3	–	4	4	–	7
Troy	3	–	4	4	–	7
Florida Atlantic	2	–	5	2	–	9
North Texas	2	–	5	2	–	9
FIU†	0	–	4	0	–	6
+ – Conference co-champions; † – The NCAA vacated all 5 of FIU's (3–4, 5–6) wins

2006 Sun Belt Conference football standings
	Conf.			Overall
Team	W		L	W		L
Troy +	6	–	1	8	–	5
Middle Tennessee +	6	–	1	7	–	6
Arkansas State	4	–	3	6	–	6
Florida Atlantic	4	–	3	5	–	7
Louisiana–Lafayette	3	–	4	6	–	6
Louisiana–Monroe	3	–	4	4	–	8
North Texas	2	–	5	3	–	9
FIU	0	–	7	0	–	12
+ – Conference co-champions

2007 Sun Belt Conference football standings
	Conf.			Overall
Team	W		L	W		L
Florida Atlantic +	6	–	1	8	–	5
Troy +	6	–	1	8	–	4
Middle Tennessee	4	–	3	5	–	7
Louisiana–Monroe	4	–	3	6	–	6
Arkansas State	3	–	4	5	–	7
Louisiana–Lafayette	3	–	4	3	–	9
FIU	1	–	6	1	–	11
North Texas	1	–	6	2	–	10
+ – Conference co-champions

2008 Sun Belt Conference football standings
	Conf.			Overall
Team	W		L	W		L
Troy $	6	–	1	8	–	5
Louisiana–Lafayette	5	–	2	6	–	6
Florida Atlantic	4	–	3	7	–	6
Arkansas State	4	–	3	6	–	6
FIU	3	–	4	5	–	7
Middle Tennessee	3	–	4	5	–	7
Louisiana–Monroe	3	–	4	4	–	8
North Texas	0	–	7	1	–	11
$ – Conference champion

2009 Sun Belt Conference football standings
	Conf.			Overall
Team	W		L	W		L
Troy $	8	–	0	9	–	4
Middle Tennessee	7	–	1	10	–	3
Louisiana–Monroe	5	–	3	6	–	6
Florida Atlantic	5	–	3	5	–	7
Louisiana–Lafayette	4	–	4	6	–	6
Arkansas State	3	–	5	4	–	8
FIU	3	–	5	3	–	9
North Texas	1	–	7	2	–	10
Western Kentucky	0	–	8	0	–	12
$ – Conference champion

2010 Sun Belt Conference football standings
	Conf.			Overall
Team	W		L	W		L
Troy +	6	–	2	8	–	5
FIU +	6	–	2	7	–	6
Middle Tennessee	5	–	3	6	–	7
Louisiana–Monroe	4	–	4	5	–	7
Arkansas State	4	–	4	4	–	8
Florida Atlantic	3	–	5	4	–	8
Louisiana–Lafayette	3	–	5	3	–	9
North Texas	3	–	5	3	–	9
Western Kentucky	2	–	6	2	–	10
+ – Conference co-champions

2011 Sun Belt Conference football standings
	Conf.			Overall
Team	W		L	W		L
Arkansas State $	8	–	0	10	–	3
Western Kentucky	7	–	1	7	–	5
FIU	5	–	3	8	–	5
North Texas	4	–	4	5	–	7
Louisiana–Monroe	3	–	5	4	–	8
Troy	2	–	6	3	–	9
Louisiana–Lafayette *	1	–	2	1	–	4
Middle Tennessee	1	–	7	2	–	10
Florida Atlantic	0	–	8	1	–	11
$ – Conference champion; * – Louisiana–Lafayette vacated 8 wins including 5 in conference due to NCAA violations.

2012 Sun Belt Conference football standings
	Conf.			Overall
Team	W		L	W		L
Arkansas State $	7	–	1	10	–	3
Louisiana–Monroe	6	–	2	8	–	5
Middle Tennessee	6	–	2	8	–	4
Louisiana–Lafayette *	4	–	2	5	–	4
Western Kentucky	4	–	4	7	–	6
Troy	3	–	5	5	–	7
North Texas	3	–	5	4	–	8
Florida Atlantic	2	–	6	3	–	9
FIU	2	–	6	3	–	9
South Alabama **	1	–	7	2	–	11
$ – Conference champion; * – Louisiana–Lafayette vacated 4 wins due to NCAA violations. ** – South Alabama was ineligible for the conference title or a bowl game as part of their transition to the FBS.

2013 Sun Belt Conference football standings
	Conf.			Overall
Team	W		L	W		L
Arkansas State $	5	–	2	8	–	5
Western Kentucky	4	–	3	8	–	4
South Alabama	4	–	3	6	–	6
Troy	4	–	3	6	–	6
Louisiana–Monroe	4	–	3	6	–	6
Texas State	2	–	5	6	–	6
Louisiana–Lafayette *	0	–	2	1	–	4
Georgia State **	0	–	7	0	–	12
$ – Conference champion; * – Louisiana–Lafayette vacated eight wins due to NCAA violations ** – Georgia State ineligible for postseason play due to FCS-to-FBS transition rules

2014 Sun Belt Conference football standings
	Conf.			Overall
Team	W		L	W		L
Georgia Southern * $	8	–	0	9	–	3
Louisiana–Lafayette ***	5	–	1	7	–	4
Appalachian State *	6	–	2	7	–	5
Texas State	5	–	3	7	–	5
Arkansas State	5	–	3	7	–	6
South Alabama	5	–	3	6	–	7
Louisiana–Monroe	3	–	5	4	–	8
Troy	3	–	5	3	–	9
New Mexico State	1	–	7	2	–	10
Idaho **	1	–	7	1	–	10
Georgia State	0	–	8	1	–	11
$ – Conference champion; * – Appalachian State and Georgia Southern ineligible for postseason play due to FCS-to-FBS transition rules ** – Idaho ineligible for postseason play due to APR penalties *** – Louisiana–Lafayette vacated 2 wins due to NCAA violations

2015 Sun Belt Conference football standings
	Conf.			Overall
Team	W		L	W		L
Arkansas State $	8	–	0	9	–	4
Appalachian State	7	–	1	11	–	2
Georgia Southern	6	–	2	9	–	4
Georgia State	5	–	3	6	–	7
South Alabama	3	–	5	5	–	7
Idaho	3	–	5	4	–	8
Louisiana–Lafayette	3	–	5	4	–	8
Troy	3	–	5	4	–	8
New Mexico State	3	–	5	3	–	9
Texas State	2	–	6	3	–	9
Louisiana–Monroe	1	–	7	2	–	11
$ – Conference champion

2016 Sun Belt Conference football standings
	Conf.			Overall
Team	W		L	W		L
Appalachian State +	7	–	1	10	–	3
Arkansas State +	7	–	1	8	–	5
Troy	6	–	2	10	–	3
Idaho	6	–	2	9	–	4
Louisiana–Lafayette	5	–	3	6	–	7
Georgia Southern	4	–	4	5	–	7
Louisiana–Monroe	3	–	5	4	–	8
South Alabama	2	–	6	6	–	7
Georgia State	2	–	6	3	–	9
New Mexico State	2	–	6	3	–	9
Texas State	0	–	8	2	–	10
+ – Conference co-champions

2017 Sun Belt Conference football standings
	Conf.			Overall
Team	W		L	W		L
Troy +	7	–	1	11	–	2
Appalachian State +	7	–	1	9	–	4
Arkansas State	6	–	2	7	–	5
Georgia State	5	–	3	7	–	5
New Mexico State	4	–	4	7	–	6
Louisiana	4	–	4	5	–	7
Louisiana–Monroe	4	–	4	4	–	8
Idaho	3	–	5	4	–	8
South Alabama	3	–	5	4	–	8
Coastal Carolina *	2	–	6	3	–	9
Georgia Southern	2	–	6	2	–	10
Texas State	1	–	7	2	–	10
+ – Conference co-champions; * – Ineligible for postseason play due to FCS-to-FBS transition rules

2018 Sun Belt Conference football standings
	Conf.			Overall
Team	W		L	W		L
East Division
Appalachian State xy$	7	–	1	11	–	2
Troy x	7	–	1	10	–	3
Georgia Southern	6	–	2	10	–	3
Coastal Carolina	2	–	6	5	–	7
Georgia State	1	–	7	2	–	10
West Division
Louisiana xy	5	–	3	7	–	7
Arkansas State x	5	–	3	8	–	5
Louisiana–Monroe	4	–	4	6	–	6
South Alabama	2	–	6	3	–	9
Texas State	1	–	7	3	–	9
Championship: Appalachian State 30, Louisiana 19
$ – Conference champion; x – Division champion/co-champions; y – Championship game participant

2019 Sun Belt Conference football standings
	Conf.			Overall
Team	W		L	W		L
East Division
No. 19 Appalachian State x$	7	–	1	13	–	1
Georgia Southern	5	–	3	7	–	6
Georgia State	4	–	4	7	–	6
Troy	3	–	5	5	–	7
Coastal Carolina	2	–	6	5	–	7
West Division
Louisiana x	7	–	1	11	–	3
Arkansas State	5	–	3	8	–	5
Louisiana–Monroe	4	–	4	5	–	7
Texas State	2	–	6	3	–	9
South Alabama	1	–	7	2	–	10
Championship: Appalachian State 45, Louisiana 38
$ – Conference champion; x – Division champion/co-champions; Rankings from AP Poll

2020 Sun Belt Conference football standings
	Conf.			Overall
Team	W		L	W		L
East Division
No. 14 Coastal Carolina xy+	8	–	0	11	–	1
Appalachian State	6	–	2	9	–	3
Georgia Southern	4	–	4	8	–	5
Georgia State	4	–	4	6	–	4
Troy	3	–	4	5	–	6
West Division
No. 15 Louisiana xy+	7	–	1	10	–	1
South Alabama	3	–	5	4	–	7
Arkansas State	2	–	6	4	–	7
Texas State	2	–	6	2	–	10
Louisiana–Monroe	0	–	7	0	–	10
Championship: Louisiana at Coastal Carolina (Canceled)
+ – Conference co-champions; x – Division champion/co-champions; y – Championship game participant; Rankings from AP Poll

2021 Sun Belt Conference football standings
	Conf.			Overall
Team	W		L	W		L
East Division
Appalachian State xy	7	–	1	10	–	4
Georgia State	6	–	2	8	–	5
Coastal Carolina	6	–	2	11	–	2
Troy	3	–	5	5	–	7
Georgia Southern	2	–	6	3	–	9
West Division
No. 16 Louisiana xy$	8	–	0	13	–	1
Texas State	3	–	5	4	–	8
Louisiana–Monroe	2	–	6	4	–	8
South Alabama	2	–	6	5	–	7
Arkansas State	1	–	7	2	–	10
Championship: Louisiana 24, Appalachian State 16
$ – Conference champion; x – Division champion/co-champions; y – Championship game participant; Rankings from AP Poll

2022 Sun Belt Conference football standings
	Conf.			Overall
Team	W		L	W		L
East Division
Coastal Carolina xy	6	–	2	9	–	4
James Madison* x	6	–	2	8	–	3
Marshall	5	–	3	9	–	4
Georgia Southern	3	–	5	6	–	7
Appalachian State	3	–	5	6	–	6
Georgia State	3	–	5	4	–	8
Old Dominion	2	–	6	3	–	9
West Division
No. 19 Troy xy$	7	–	1	12	–	2
South Alabama x	7	–	1	10	–	3
Southern Miss	4	–	4	7	–	6
Louisiana	4	–	4	6	–	7
Louisiana–Monroe	3	–	5	4	–	8
Texas State	2	–	6	4	–	8
Arkansas State	1	–	7	3	–	9
Championship: Troy 45, Coastal Carolina 26
$ – Conference champion; x – Division champion/co-champions; y – Championship game participant; * – Ineligible for postseason play due to FCS-to-FBS transition rules; Rankings from AP Poll

2023 Sun Belt Conference football standings
	Conf.			Overall
Team	W		L	W		L
East Division
James Madison* x	7	–	1	11	–	2
Appalachian State y	6	–	2	9	–	5
Coastal Carolina	5	–	3	8	–	5
Old Dominion	5	–	3	6	–	7
Georgia State	3	–	5	7	–	6
Marshall	3	–	5	6	–	7
Georgia Southern	3	–	5	6	–	7
West Division
Troy xy$	7	–	1	11	–	3
Texas State	4	–	4	8	–	5
Arkansas State	4	–	4	6	–	7
South Alabama	4	–	4	7	–	6
Louisiana	3	–	5	6	–	7
Southern Miss	2	–	6	3	–	9
Louisiana–Monroe	0	–	8	2	–	10
Championship: Troy 49, Appalachian State 23
$ – Conference champion; x – Division champion/co-champions; y – Championship game participant; * – Ineligible for postseason play due to FCS-to-FBS transition rules

2024 Sun Belt Conference football standings
	Conf.			Overall
Team	W		L	W		L
East Division
Marshall xy$	7	–	1	10	–	3
Georgia Southern	6	–	2	8	–	5
James Madison	4	–	4	9	–	4
Old Dominion	4	–	4	5	–	7
Coastal Carolina	3	–	5	6	–	7
Appalachian State	3	–	5	5	–	6
Georgia State	1	–	7	3	–	9
West Division
Louisiana xy	7	–	1	10	–	4
Texas State	5	–	3	8	–	5
Arkansas State	5	–	3	8	–	5
South Alabama	5	–	3	7	–	6
Louisiana–Monroe	3	–	5	5	–	7
Troy	3	–	5	4	–	8
Southern Miss	0	–	8	1	–	11
Championship: Marshall 31, Louisiana 3
$ – Conference champion; x – Division champion/co-champions; y – Championship game participant

2025 Sun Belt Conference football standings
	Conf.			Overall
Team	W		L	W		L
East Division
No. 24 James Madison xy$^	8	–	0	12	–	1
Old Dominion	6	–	2	10	–	3
Coastal Carolina	5	–	3	6	–	6
Georgia Southern	4	–	4	6	–	6
Marshall	3	–	5	5	–	7
Appalachian State	2	–	6	5	–	7
Georgia State	0	–	8	1	–	11
West Division
Troy xy	6	–	2	8	–	6
Southern Miss	5	–	3	7	–	5
Louisiana	5	–	3	6	–	7
Arkansas State	5	–	3	7	–	6
Texas State	3	–	5	6	–	6
South Alabama	3	–	5	4	–	8
Louisiana–Monroe	1	–	7	3	–	9
Championship: James Madison 31, Troy 14
^ – College Football Playoff participant; $ – Conference champion; x – Division champion/co-champions; y – Championship game participant; As of December 19, 2025; Rankings from CFP Rankings
