= List of Sun Belt Conference football champions =

This is a list of yearly Sun Belt Conference football champions. Co-champions are listed in alphabetical order. From 2001 to 2017, there had not been a tie breaker for conference champions. Since 2018, an outright conference champion is determined by the Sun Belt Conference Football Championship Game.

Schools are listed by their current athletic branding, not necessarily what they used in a given season.

== Champions by year ==
=== Pre-championship game era (2001–2017) ===
Year	Champions	Conference record	Overall record	Bowl result
2001	Middle Tennessee	5–1	8–3	—N/a
2001	North Texas	5–1	5–7	L New Orleans Bowl 20–45 vs. Colorado State
2002	North Texas	6–0	8–5	W New Orleans Bowl 25–19 vs. Cincinnati
2003	North Texas	7–0	9–4	L New Orleans Bowl 17–27 vs. Memphis
2004	North Texas	7–0	7–5	L New Orleans Bowl 10–31 vs. Southern Miss
2005	Arkansas State	5–2	6–6	L New Orleans Bowl 19–31 vs. Southern Miss
2005	Louisiana	5–2	6–5	—N/a
2005	Louisiana-Monroe	5–2	5–6	—N/a
2006	Middle Tennessee	6–1	7–6	—N/a
2006	Troy	6–1	8–5	W New Orleans Bowl 41–17 vs. Rice
2007	Florida Atlantic	6–1	8–5	W New Orleans Bowl 44–27 vs. Memphis
2007	Troy	6–1	8–4	—N/a
2008	Troy	6–1	8–5	L New Orleans Bowl 27–30 vs. Southern Miss
2009	Troy	8–0	9–4	L GMAC Bowl 41–44 vs. Central Michigan
2010	FIU	6–2	7–6	W Little Caesars Pizza Bowl 34–32 vs. Toledo
2010	Troy	6–2	8–5	W New Orleans Bowl 48–21 vs. Ohio
2011	Arkansas State	8–0	10–3	L GoDaddy.com Bowl 20–38 vs. Northern Illinois
2012	Arkansas State	7–1	10–3	W GoDaddy.com Bowl 17–13 vs. Kent State
2013	Arkansas State	5–2	7–5	W GoDaddy Bowl 23–20 vs. Ball State
2013	Louisiana	5–2	8–4	W New Orleans Bowl 24–21 vs. Tulane
2014	Georgia Southern (Note: Ineligible for postseason play due to FCS-to-FBS transition rules.)	8–0	9–3	—N/a
2015	Arkansas State	8–0	9–3	L New Orleans Bowl 28–47 vs. Louisiana Tech
2016	Appalachian State	7–1	9–3	W Camellia Bowl 31–28 vs. Toledo
2016	Arkansas State	7–1	8–5	W Cure Bowl 31–13 vs. UCF
2017	Troy	7–1	10–2	W New Orleans Bowl 50–30 vs. North Texas
2017	Appalachian State	7–1	8–4	W Dollar General Bowl 34–0 vs. Toledo

=== Sun Belt Conference Championship Game (2018–present) ===
Year	East Division	Score	West Division	Site	Date	Attendance
2018	Appalachian State	30–19	Louisiana	Kidd Brewer Stadium • Boone, North Carolina	December 1, 2018	14,963
2019	No. 21 Appalachian State	45–38	Louisiana	Kidd Brewer Stadium • Boone, North Carolina	December 7, 2019	18,618
2020†	No. 12 Coastal Carolina	No Contest	No. 19 Louisiana	Brooks Stadium • Conway, South Carolina	December 19, 2020	N/A
2021	Appalachian State	16–24	No. 24 Louisiana	Cajun Field • Lafayette, Louisiana	December 4, 2021	31,014
2022	Coastal Carolina	26–45	Troy	Veterans Memorial Stadium • Troy, Alabama	December 3, 2022	21,554
2023	Appalachian State	23–49	Troy	Veterans Memorial Stadium • Troy, Alabama	December 2, 2023	20,183
2024	Marshall	31–3	Louisiana	Cajun Field • Lafayette, Louisiana	December 7, 2024	20,067
2025	No. 25 James Madison	31–14	Troy	Bridgeforth Stadium • Harrisonburg, Virginia	December 5, 2025	19,386

† 2020 game canceled due to COVID-19 pandemic.

== Championships by team ==
Rank	Team	Championships	Years
1	Troy	8	2006, 2007, **2008**, **2009**, 2010, 2017, **2022**, **2023**
2	Arkansas State	6	2005, **2011**, **2012**, 2013, **2015**, 2016
3 (T)	Appalachian State	4	2016, 2017, **2018**, **2019**
3 (T)	Louisiana	4	2005, ~~2013~~, 2020, **2021**
3 (T)	North Texas	4	2001, **2002**, **2003**, **2004**
4	Middle Tennessee	2	2001, 2006
5 (T)	Coastal Carolina	1	2020
5 (T)	FIU	1	2010
5 (T)	Florida Atlantic	1	2007
5 (T)	Georgia Southern	1	**2014**
5 (T)	Louisiana–Monroe	1	2005
5 (T)	Marshall	1	**2024**
5 (T)	James Madison	1	**2025**

Bold indicates an outright title.

(T) indicates a tie.

Italics indicate team is no longer a member of the Sun Belt Conference.

== See also ==
- List of Sun Belt Conference football standings
