= Kimani Jones =

American football player (born 1981)

No. 54
- Position: Offensive lineman

Personal information
- Born: December 21, 1981 (age 44); Mound Bayou, Mississippi, U.S.
- Listed height: 6 ft 4 in (1.93 m)
- Listed weight: 330 lb (150 kg)

Career information
- High school: Kennedy (Mound Bayou)
- College: Arkansas State
- NFL draft: 2006: undrafted

Career history
- Cleveland Gladiators (2008); Omaha Beef (2009); Bossier-Shreveport Battle Wings (2010); Kansas City Command (2011–2012); San Jose SaberCats (2014–2015)

Awards and highlights
- ArenaBowl champion (2015); Second-team All-IFL (2009); First-team All-Sun Belt (2003)

Career AFL statistics
- Receptions: 6
- Receiving yards: 20
- Receiving TDs: 1
- Tackles: 15
- Stats at ArenaFan.com

Kimani Jones (born December 21, 1981) is an American former professional football offensive lineman who played in the Arena Football League (AFL). He played college football for the Arkansas State Red Wolves.

== College career ==
Jones played college football at Arkansas State University. As a senior, he earned first-team All-Sun Belt Conference honors.

== Professional career ==
In 2008, following his departure from Arkansas State, Jones joined the Arena Football League's Cleveland Gladiators. As a rookie, Jones appeared in all sixteen of the team's regular season games; moreover, he caught six passes for twenty yards and a touchdown. His career was interrupted by the AFL's 2009 decision to suspend operations; during this time, Jones signed with the Omaha Beef of the Indoor Football League, where he earned Second Team All-IFL honors. When the league returned in 2010, Jones signed on with the Bossier-Shreveport Battle Wings. He appeared in eleven games during his lone season with the team. In 2011, Jones joined the AFL's Kansas City Command; over two seasons, he would appear in all but two of Kansas City's games. The Command folded at the end of the 2012 season; following this, Jones sat out the entire 2013 Arena Football League season. On April 2, 2014, he signed with the San Jose SaberCats; Jones appeared in twelve games (starting nine) as the SaberCats won their first division title since 2008. In May 2015, following the SaberCats' 2014 playoff loss to the Arizona Rattlers, Jones rejoined the SaberCats; he won his first AFL Championship when San Jose beat the Jacksonville Sharks in ArenaBowl XXVIII at the end of the season.
