= 2003 Troy State Trojans football team =

American college football season

2003 Troy State Trojans football
- Conference: Independent
- Record: 6–6
- Head coach: Larry Blakeney (13th season)
- Offensive coordinator: Mark Fleetwood (1st season)
- Offensive scheme: I formation
- Defensive coordinator: Vic Koenning (1st season)
- Base defense: 4–3
- Home stadium: Movie Gallery Stadium

2003 NCAA Division I-A independents football records
	Conf.			Overall
Team	W		L	W		L
Connecticut		–		9	–	3
Navy		–		8	–	5
Troy State		–		6	–	6
Notre Dame		–		5	–	7
Rankings from AP Poll

The 2003 Troy State Trojans football team represented Troy State University—now known as Troy University—as an independent during the 2003 NCAA Division I-A football season. Led by 13th-year head coach Larry Blakeney, the Trojans compiled a record of 6–6. Troy State played home games at Movie Gallery Stadium in Troy, Alabama.

On September 27, Troy had one of biggest wins in the program's history, defeating Marshall, 33–24, in front of a record crowd of 26,000. Marshall finished the previous season as the No. 24-ranked team in the AP Poll upset No. 6 Kansas State the week before. After the game, students and fans in attendance rushed the field and tore down the goal posts.

== Schedule ==
Date	Opponent	Site	TV	Result	Attendance	Source
August 30	at No. 7 Kansas State	KSU Stadium; Manhattan, KS		L 5–41	41,812	
September 6	at Minnesota	Hubert H. Humphrey Metrodome; Minneapolis, MN	ESPN Plus	L 7–48	31,393	
September 13	at UAB	Legion Field; Birmingham, AL		W 20–9	18,216	
September 20	Southeastern Louisiana	Movie Gallery Stadium; Troy, AL	Cox Sports	W 28-0	19,889	
September 27	Marshall	Movie Gallery Stadium; Troy, AL	ESPN Regional	W 33-24	26,000	
October 4	at No. 12 Nebraska	Memorial Stadium; incoln, NE		L 0–30	77,825	
October 18	FIU^{†}	Movie Gallery Stadium; Troy, AL		W 21–10	19,417	
October 25	at Virginia	Scott Stadium; Charlottesville, VA		L 0–24	57,580	
October 30	at North Texas	Fouts Field; Denton, TX	ESPN Regional	L 0–21	11,128	
November 8	at Middle Tennessee	Johnny "Red" Floyd Stadium; Murfreesboro, TN (Battle for the Palladium)	ESPN Regional	L 20–27	6,563	
November 15	at Utah State	Romney Stadium; Logan, UT		W 23–14	9,291	
November 22	Louisiana–Monroe	Movie Gallery Stadium; Troy, AL		W 28–24	19,057	
^{†}Homecoming; Rankings from AP Poll released prior to the game
