= Fremont High School (Nebraska) =

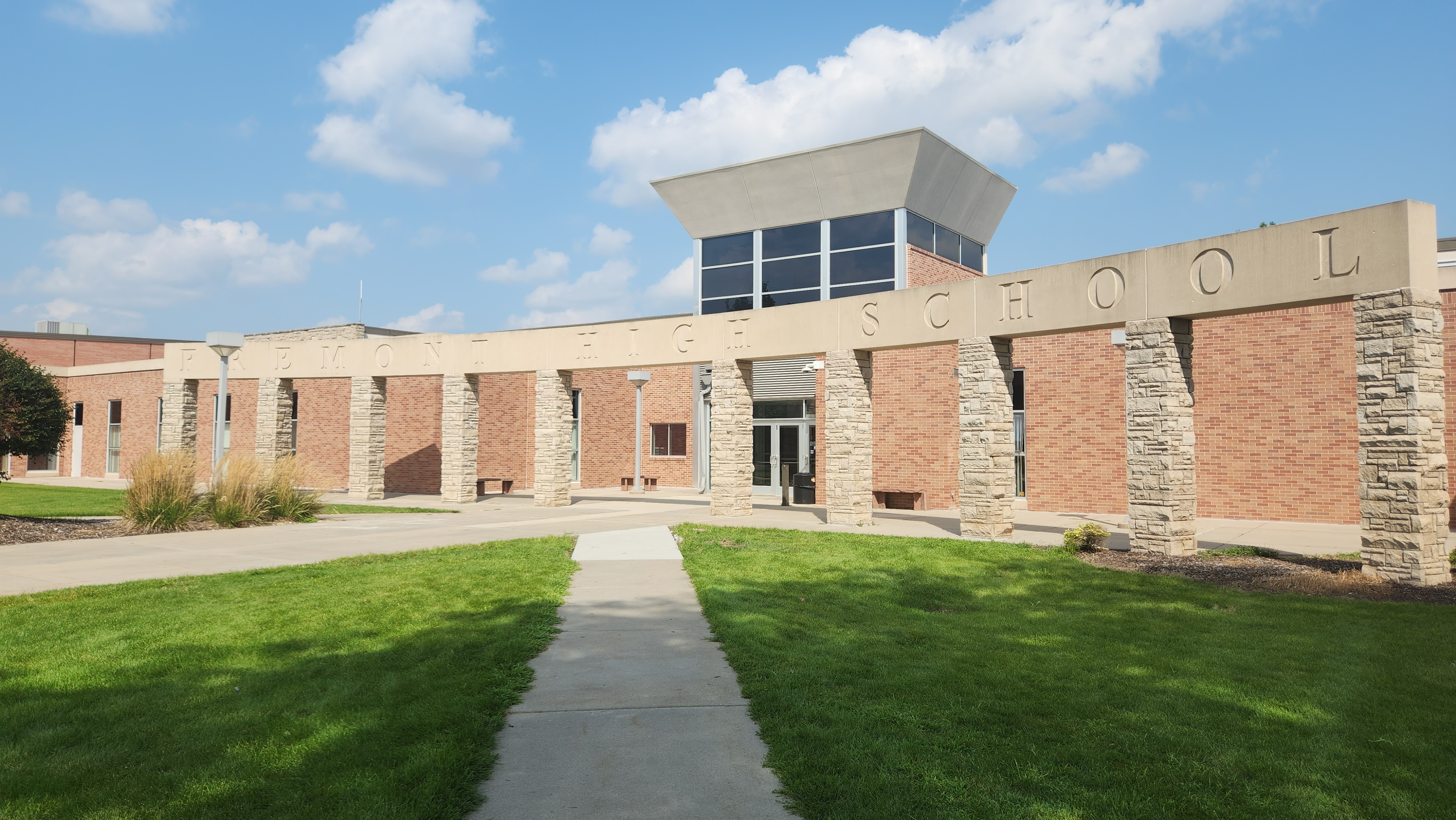

Location
- 1750 N Lincoln Ave; Fremont, Dodge County, Nebraska 68025; United States; 41°26′45″N 96°28′37″W

Information
- Type: Public high school
- School district: Fremont Public Schools
- Superintendent: Brad Dahl
- Principal: Myron Sikora
- Teaching staff: 83.97 (on an FTE basis)
- Grades: 9–12
- Enrollment: 1,633 (2022–23)
- Student to teacher ratio: 19.45
- Colors: Black and Gold
- Team name: Tigers
- Newspaper: The Tiger's Eye
- Website: fremonttigers.org/o/fhs

Fremont High School (FHS) is the sole public high school for the city of Fremont, Nebraska, United States. FHS operates grades 9–12; its enrollment for the 2022–23 academic year was 1633 students. The school's athletic teams are the Tigers and its colors are black and gold.

== History ==
=== Protest incident ===
On January 29, 2026, a student was struck by a juvenile driving an SUV with a Donald Trump 2024 presidential campaign flag on the back during a student-led protest against Immigration and Customs Enforcement. The driver had just re-entered the vehicle after allegedly confronting someone for attempting to damage his SUV. The driver stopped briefly after hitting the student, before driving away from the scene. The injured student was immediately tended to by other students. A day later, the Fremont Police Department (FPD) said it had located the driver of the vehicle, and he told police he left the scene because he was fearful of being hurt by protestors if he stopped. The FPD concluded that the driver was not responsible, and the student who was struck was in the road improperly.

== Athletics ==
The Tigers compete in the Heartland Conference in the following sports:

- Baseball
- Basketball (boys and girls)
- Bowling (boys and girls)
- Cross Country (boys and girls)
- Football
- Golf (boys and girls)
- Soccer (boys and girls)
- Softball
- Swimming
- Tennis (boys and girls)
- Track and Field (boys and girls)
- Volleyball
- Wrestling

State championships
Season	Sport	Number of championships	Year
Fall	Football	1	1968
Fall	Cross country, boys	12	1980, 1993, 2002, 2004, 2005, 2010, 2012, 2018, 2020, 2021, 2022, 2024
Fall	Cross country, girls	1	2002
Fall	Volleyball	1	1973
Fall	Softball	0	
Fall	Golf, girls	0	
Fall	Tennis, boys	1	1974
Fall	Unified bowling	2	2018, 2021
Winter	Basketball, boys	2	1951, 1961
Winter	Basketball, girls	1	2022
Winter	Swimming & Diving, boys	0	
Winter	Swimming & Diving, girls	0	
Winter	Wrestling, boys	0	
Winter	Wrestling, girls	0	
Winter	Bowling, boys	1	2026
Winter	Bowling, girls	1	2023
Spring	Baseball	0	
Spring	Soccer, boys	0	
Spring	Soccer, girls	0	
Spring	Track and field, boys	8	1981, 1984, 1985, 1986, 1990, 2005, 2019, 2022
Spring	Track and field, girls	1	2021
Spring	Golf, boys	3	1954, 1958, 1972
Spring	Tennis, girls	1	1985
Total		31	

== Alumni ==
- Sue Bierman (Class of 1942), Fremont High School Valedictorian, Civic Leader, San Francisco,
- Thomas M. Carsey, Professor of Political Science
- Gerry Gdowski (Class of 1986), football quarterback for Nebraska, college football coach, Fremont High School Valedictorian.
- Richard A. Jensen (Class of 1953), theologian
- Ben Sasse (Class of 1990), U.S. Senator from Nebraska and former president of Midland University and of the University of Florida
- Jessica Shepard (Class of 2015), Notre Dame Women's Basketball, WNBA (Minnesota Lynx)
