= 2004 New Mexico State Aggies football team =

American college football season

2004 New Mexico State Aggies football
- Conference: Sun Belt Conference
- Record: 5–6 (3–2 Sun Belt)
- Head coach: Tony Samuel (8th season)
- Offensive coordinator: Gerry Gdowski (2nd season)
- Offensive scheme: Option
- Defensive coordinator: Ross Els (2nd season)
- Base defense: 4–3
- Home stadium: Aggie Memorial Stadium

2004 Sun Belt Conference football standings
	Conf.			Overall
Team	W		L	W		L
North Texas $	7	–	0	7	–	5
Troy State	4	–	2	7	–	5
New Mexico State	3	–	2	5	–	6
Middle Tennessee	4	–	4	5	–	6
Louisiana–Monroe	3	–	3	5	–	6
Arkansas State	3	–	4	3	–	8
Louisiana–Lafayette	2	–	5	4	–	7
Utah State	2	–	5	3	–	8
Idaho	2	–	5	3	–	9
$ – Conference champion

The 2004 New Mexico State Aggies football team represented New Mexico State University in the 2004 NCAA Division I-A football season. The Aggies were coached by head coach Tony Samuel, whose contract was not renewed after the season, and played their home games at Aggie Memorial Stadium in Las Cruces, New Mexico. They participated in their final season as members of the Sun Belt Conference, as they would join the Western Athletic Conference the following year.

== Schedule ==
Date	Time	Opponent	Site	TV	Result	Attendance
September 4	5:00 pm	at Arkansas*	Donald W. Reynolds Razorback Stadium; Fayetteville, AR		L 13–63	70,114
September 11	4:30 pm	at No. 12 California*	California Memorial Stadium; Berkeley, CA	KTVF	L 14–41	58,949
September 18	6:05 pm	Troy State	Aggie Memorial Stadium; Las Cruces, NM		W 22–18	17,587
September 25	6:05 pm	New Mexico*	Aggie Memorial Stadium; Las Cruces, NM (Rio Grande Rivalry)	SPW	L 3–38	31,214
October 2	7:05 pm	at UTEP*	Sun Bowl; El Paso, TX (Battle of I-10)		L 0–45	46,123
October 9	6:05 pm	Louisiana–Lafayette	Aggie Memorial Stadium; Las Cruces, NM		W 35–32	9,748
October 23	5:05 pm	at North Texas	Fouts Field; Denton, TX	ESPN Plus	L 26–36	18,729
October 30	6:05 pm	FIU*^{†}	Aggie Memorial Stadium; Las Cruces, NM		W 56–31	14,472
November 6	6:05 pm	Middle Tennessee	Aggie Memorial Stadium; Las Cruces, NM		W 44–10	18,485
November 13	2:00 pm	at Florida Atlantic*	Lockhart Stadium; Fort Lauderdale, FL		W 35–7	11,628
November 20	1:05 pm	at Utah State	Romney Stadium; Logan, UT		L 25–34	15,238
*Non-conference game; ^{†}Homecoming; Rankings from AP Poll released prior to the game; All times are in Mountain time
