= 2003 New Mexico State Aggies football team =

American college football season

2003 New Mexico State Aggies football
- Conference: Sun Belt Conference
- Record: 3–9 (2–5 Sun Belt)
- Head coach: Tony Samuel (7th season)
- Offensive coordinator: Gerry Gdowski (1st season)
- Offensive scheme: Option
- Defensive coordinator: Ross Els (1st season)
- Base defense: 4–3
- Home stadium: Aggie Memorial Stadium

2003 Sun Belt Conference football standings
	Conf.			Overall
Team	W		L	W		L
North Texas $	7	–	0	9	–	4
Louisiana–Lafayette	3	–	2	4	–	8
Arkansas State	3	–	3	5	–	7
Middle Tennessee	3	–	3	4	–	8
Utah State	3	–	3	3	–	9
Idaho	3	–	4	3	–	9
New Mexico State	2	–	5	3	–	9
Louisiana–Monroe	1	–	5	1	–	11
$ – Conference champion

The 2003 New Mexico State Aggies football team represented New Mexico State University in the 2003 NCAA Division I-A football season. The Aggies were coached by head coach Tony Samuel and played their home games at Aggie Memorial Stadium in Las Cruces, New Mexico. They were members of the Sun Belt Conference.

== Schedule ==
Date	Time	Opponent	Site	TV	Result	Attendance
August 31	5:00 pm	at No. 5 Texas*	Darrell K Royal–Texas Memorial Stadium; Austin, TX	FSN	L 7–66	83,096
September 6	6:00 pm	Western New Mexico	Aggie Memorial Stadium; Las Cruces, NM		W 48–3	19,227
September 13	4:30 pm	at Oregon State*	Reser Stadium; Corvallis, OR		L 16–28	35,831
September 27	6:00 pm	at New Mexico*	University Stadium; Albuquerque, NM (Rio Grande Rivalry)		L 17–24	44,075
October 4	6:00 pm	Idaho	Aggie Memorial Stadium; Las Cruces, NM		L 31–35	18,624
October 11	1:00 pm	at Middle Tennessee	Johnny "Red" Floyd Stadium; Murfreesboro, TN		L 18–35	9,114
October 16	5:00 pm	at Louisiana–Lafayette	Cajun Field; Lafayette, LA	ESPN Plus	L 24–26	12,308
October 25	5:00 pm	at Louisiana–Monroe	Malone Stadium; Monroe, LA		W 21–14	7,108
November 1	5:00 pm	Arkansas State^{†}	Aggie Memorial Stadium; Las Cruces, NM	ESPN Plus	L 24–28	19,702
November 6	6:00 pm	Utah State	Aggie Memorial Stadium; Las Cruces, NM	ESPN Plus	W 26–21	10,318
November 15	12:00 pm	at Arkansas*	Donald W. Reynolds Razorback Stadium; Fayetteville, AR		L 20–48	53,728
November 25	5:00 pm	North Texas	Aggie Memorial Stadium; Las Cruces, NM	ESPN2	L 10–13	12,472
*Non-conference game; ^{†}Homecoming; Rankings from AP Poll released prior to the game; All times are in Mountain time
