= 2004 Silicon Valley Football Classic =

American college football game

Troy Trojans	Northern Illinois Huskies
(7–4)	(8–3)
21	34
Head coach: Larry Blakeney	Head coach: Joe Novak
	1	2	3	4	Total
Troy	14	0	0	7	21
Northern Illinois	14	10	3	7	34
- Date: December 30, 2004
- Season: 2004
- Stadium: Spartan Stadium
- Location: San Jose, California
- MVP: RB DeWhitt Betterson (Troy); S Lionel Hickenbottom (NIU); KR Dustin Utschig (NIU)
- Referee: Joe Rider (ACC)
- Payout: US$720,000

United States TV coverage
- Network: ESPN2
- Announcers: Pam Ward (play-by-play); Mike Tomczak (analyst); Dave Ryan (sidelines)

The 2004 Silicon Valley Football Classic was a post-season college football bowl game between the Troy Trojans and the Northern Illinois Huskies on December 30, 2004, at Spartan Stadium in San Jose, California. It was the fifth and final time the Silicon Valley Football Classic was played and the final game of the 2004 NCAA Division I-A football season for both teams. Northern Illinois defeated Troy 34-21.

== Background ==
For the 2004 bowl season the Silicon Valley Classic had contractual tie-ins with the Western Athletic Conference (WAC) and the Pacific-10 Conference (Pac-10); neither conference had enough bowl-eligible teams. In previous years the SVC had an agreement to take the Pac-10's No. 6 team, but was displaced by the new Emerald Bowl and had to settle for No. 7, if one existed. Organizers obtained permission from the Pac-10 to look elsewhere, and on November 16 announced an agreement with the Mid-American Conference, which had five bowl-eligible teams but as yet only two bowls.

Since the beginning of the bowl in 2000, the Fresno State Bulldogs represented the WAC. Although the SVC invited Fresno State back, the Bulldogs opted for the MPC Computers Bowl, where they would face #18-ranked Virginia from the ACC. Left without a WAC team, organizers turned to the Troy Trojans of the Sun Belt Conference. Troy had never played in a bowl game before, having just moved up to Division I in 2001 and joined the Sun Belt in 2004.

== Game summary ==
- Troy - McDowell 1 yard touchdown run (Whibbs kick), 1st 10:41 (9-78, 4:19)
- Troy - Richardson 23 yard touchdown pass from McDowell (Whibbs kick), 1st 6:05 (8-73, 2:51)
- Northern Illinois - Wolfe 50 yard touchdown run (Nendick kick), 1st 4:46 (3-73, 1:19)
- Northern Illinois - Haldi 1 yard touchdown run (Nendick kick), 1st 1:15 (5-28, 1:46)
- Northern Illinois - Nendick 30 yard field goal, 2nd 9:49 (4-1, 1:35)
- Northern Illinois - Haldi 1 yard touchdown run (Nendick kick), 2nd 0:34 (7-56, 2:45)
- Northern Illinois - Nendick 39 yard field goal, 3rd 7:50 (9-46, 3:35)
- Northern Illinois - Harris 3 yard touchdown run (Nendick kick), 4th 14:30 (11-70, 6:37)
- Troy - McDowell 4 yard touchdown run (Whibbs kick), 4th 10:50 (9-82, 3:40)

Rain could not stop the Huskies from scoring 34 straight points after trailing 14-0 early in the first quarter. Northern Illinois rushed for 213 yards (as opposed to Troy's 170) while passing for 146 yards to the 122 yards of the Trojans. NIU had the ball for 32:08 of the game. Josh Hadli threw 8-of-24 for 146 yards while rushing for 11 yards on 5 carries. For Troy, DeWhitt Betterson rushed for 150 yards on 25 carries.
