= 2004 Arkansas Razorbacks football team =

American college football season

2004 Arkansas Razorbacks football
- Conference: Southeastern Conference
- Western Division
- Record: 5–6 (3–5 SEC)
- Head coach: Houston Nutt (7th season)
- Offensive coordinator: Roy Wittke (2nd season)
- Offensive scheme: Pro-style
- Defensive coordinator: Dave Wommack (3rd season)
- Base defense: 4–3
- Captains: DeCori Birmingham; Arrion Dixon; Steven Harris; Jeb Huckeba; Matt Jones; Marcus Whitmore
- Home stadium: Donald W. Reynolds Razorback Stadium; War Memorial Stadium

2004 Southeastern Conference football standings
	Conf.			Overall
Team	W		L	W		L
Eastern Division
No. 13 Tennessee x	7	–	1	10	–	3
No. 7 Georgia	6	–	2	10	–	2
Florida	4	–	4	7	–	5
South Carolina	4	–	4	6	–	5
Kentucky	1	–	7	2	–	9
Vanderbilt	1	–	7	2	–	9
Western Division
No. 2 Auburn x$	8	–	0	13	–	0
No. 16 LSU	6	–	2	9	–	3
Alabama	3	–	5	6	–	6
Arkansas	3	–	5	5	–	6
Ole Miss	3	–	5	4	–	7
Mississippi State	2	–	6	3	–	8
Championship: Auburn 38, Tennessee 28
$ – BCS representative as conference champion; x – Division champion/co-champions; Rankings from AP Poll

The 2004 Arkansas Razorbacks football team represented the University of Arkansas as a member of the Western Division in the Southeastern Conference (SEC) during the 2004 NCAA Division I-A football season. Led by seventh-year head coach Houston Nutt, the Razorbacks compiled an overall record of 5–6 with a mark of 3–5 in conference play, placing in a three-way tie for third in the SEC's Western Division. The team played five home games at Donald W. Reynolds Razorback Stadium in Fayetteville, Arkansas and two home games at War Memorial Stadium in Little Rock, Arkansas.

== Schedule ==
Date	Time	Opponent	Site	TV	Result	Attendance
September 4	6:00 pm	New Mexico State*	Donald W. Reynolds Razorback Stadium; Fayetteville, AR		W 63–13	70,114
September 11	7:45 pm	No. 7 Texas*	Donald W. Reynolds Razorback Stadium; Fayetteville, AR (rivalry)	ESPN	L 20–22	75,675
September 18	6:00 pm	Louisiana-Monroe*	War Memorial Stadium; Little Rock, AR		W 49–20	55,652
September 25	2:30 pm	Alabama	Donald W. Reynolds Razorback Stadium; Fayetteville, AR	CBS	W 27–10	72,543
October 2	11:00 am	at No. 16 Florida	Ben Hill Griffin Stadium; Gainesville, FL	CBS	L 30–45	90,014
October 16	2:30 pm	at No. 4 Auburn	Jordan–Hare Stadium; Auburn, AL	CBS	L 20–38	87,451
October 23	6:00 pm	No. 10 Georgia^{†}	Donald W. Reynolds Razorback Stadium; Fayetteville, AR	ESPN2	L 14–20	71,644
November 6	11:30 am	at South Carolina	Williams–Brice Stadium; Columbia, SC	JPS	L 32–35	78,800
November 13	11:30 am	Ole Miss	Donald W. Reynolds Razorback Stadium; Fayetteville, AR (rivalry)	JPS	W 35–3	63,474
November 20	1:30 pm	at Mississippi State	Davis Wade Stadium; Starkville, MS	PPV	W 24–21	43,634
November 26	1:30 pm	No. 14 LSU	War Memorial Stadium; Little Rock, AR (rivalry)	CBS	L 14–43	55,829
*Non-conference game; ^{†}Homecoming; Rankings from AP Poll released prior to the game; All times are in Central time

== Game summaries ==
=== New Mexico State ===
	1	2	3	4	Total
Aggies	0	6	7	0	13
Razorbacks	14	28	14	7	63

=== At No. 7 Texas ===
	1	2	3	4	Total
No. 7 Longhorns	16	0	6	0	22
Razorbacks	7	10	0	3	20

=== Louisiana–Monroe ===
	1	2	3	4	Total
Indians	3	17	0	0	20
Razorbacks	14	21	7	7	49

=== Alabama ===
	1	2	3	4	Total
Crimson Tide	0	10	0	0	10
Razorbacks	7	7	0	13	27

=== At No. 16 Florida ===
	1	2	3	4	Total
Razorbacks	0	7	7	16	30
No. 16 Gators	7	28	3	7	45

=== At No. 4 Auburn ===
	1	2	3	4	Total
Razorbacks	0	7	7	6	20
No. 4 Tigers	17	13	8	0	38

=== No. 10 Georgia ===
	1	2	3	4	Total
No. 10 Bulldogs	3	7	7	3	20
Razorbacks	7	7	0	0	14

=== At South Carolina ===
	1	2	3	4	Total
Razorbacks	14	3	0	15	32
Gamecocks	7	7	14	7	35

=== Ole Miss ===
	1	2	3	4	Total
Rebels	0	3	0	0	3
Razorbacks	14	14	7	0	35

=== At Mississippi State ===
	1	2	3	4	Total
Razorbacks	3	14	7	0	24
Bulldogs	14	0	0	7	21

=== No. 14 LSU ===
	1	2	3	4	Total
No. 14 Tigers	10	17	7	9	43
Razorbacks	7	7	0	0	14
