= 2003 Idaho Vandals football team =

American college football season

2003 Idaho Vandals football
- Conference: Sun Belt Conference
- Record: 3–9 (3–4 SBC)
- Head coach: Tom Cable (4th season)
- Offensive coordinator: Bret Ingalls (4th season)
- Offensive scheme: Pro-style
- Defensive coordinator: Ed Lamb (2nd season)
- Base defense: Multiple
- Home stadium: Kibbie Dome

2003 Sun Belt Conference football standings
	Conf.			Overall
Team	W		L	W		L
North Texas $	7	–	0	9	–	4
Louisiana–Lafayette	3	–	2	4	–	8
Arkansas State	3	–	3	5	–	7
Middle Tennessee	3	–	3	4	–	8
Utah State	3	–	3	3	–	9
Idaho	3	–	4	3	–	9
New Mexico State	2	–	5	3	–	9
Louisiana–Monroe	1	–	5	1	–	11
$ – Conference champion

The 2003 Idaho Vandals football team represented the University of Idaho during the 2003 NCAA Division I-A football season. Idaho was a football-only member of the Sun Belt Conference, and played their home games in the Kibbie Dome, an indoor facility on campus in Moscow. The Vandals went 3–9 under head coach and alumnus Tom Cable, in his fourth and final season.

Prior to Cable's arrival in 2000, Idaho had just two losing seasons (1981, 1997) in two decades; he had four consecutive with a 11–35 (.239) record and was fired immediately after the season.

== Schedule ==
Date	Time	Opponent	Site	TV	Result	Attendance	Source
August 30	7:30 pm	vs. Washington State*	Seahawks Stadium; Seattle, WA (Battle of the Palouse, Cougar Gridiron Classic)	FSN	L 0–25	50,113	
September 6	4:30 pm	Eastern Washington*	Kibbie Dome; Moscow, ID		L 5–8	13,556	
September 13	5:30 pm	Boise State*	Kibbie Dome; Moscow, ID (rivalry)	KBCI	L 10–24	14,320	
September 20	1:00 pm	at No. 19 Washington*	Husky Stadium; Seattle, WA	FSN	L 14–45	71,178	
September 27	1:05 pm	at No. 9 (I-AA) Montana*	Washington–Grizzly Stadium; Missoula, MT (Little Brown Stein)	MTN	L 28–41	23,679	
October 4	6:00 pm	at New Mexico State	Aggie Memorial Stadium; Las Cruces, NM		W 35–31	18,624	
October 11	4:00 pm	North Texas^{†}	Kibbie Dome; Moscow, ID		L 14–24	12,845	
October 18	2:00 pm	Middle Tennessee	Kibbie Dome; Moscow, ID		L 21–28 ^{OT}	9,752	
October 25	2:00 pm	at Louisiana–Lafayette	Cajun Field; Lafayette, LA		L 20–31	9,213	
November 8	2:00 pm	at Arkansas State	Indian Stadium; Jonesboro, AR		L 23–24	12,839	
November 15	6:05 pm	at Louisiana–Monroe	Malone Stadium; Monroe, LA	ESPN Plus	W 58–20	14,583	
November 22	2:00 pm	Utah State	Kibbie Dome; Moscow, ID		W 20–13	9,846	
*Non-conference game; ^{†}Homecoming; Rankings from AP Poll released prior to the game; All times are in Pacific time

== NFL draft ==
One Vandal senior was selected in the 2004 NFL draft, which lasted seven rounds (255 selections).

Player	Position	Round	Overall	Franchise
Jake Scott	Guard	5th	141	Indianapolis Colts
