= Chris Hurd =

American football player and coach (born 1980)

Current position
- Title: Special Teams Coordinator
- Team: Illinois
- Conference: Big Ten

Biographical details
- Born: November 30, 1980 (age 45); Killeen, Texas, U.S.

Playing career
- 1999–2003: North Texas
- Position: Linebacker

Coaching career (HC unless noted)
- 2004–2006: North Texas (GA)
- 2007: Cisco (DB)
- 2008–2010: Cisco (DC/STC)
- 2011–2012: Tennessee (S&C asst.)
- 2013: Arkansas (STQC)
- 2014–2016: Florida Atlantic (STC/TE)
- 2017–2018: Chattanooga (STC/RB)
- 2019–2021: Akron (STC/FB)
- 2022: Arkansas (ST analyst)
- 2023–present: Illinois (ST Coordinator)

Accomplishments and honors

Awards
- Sun Belt Defensive Player of the Year (2003); First-team All-Sun Belt (2003)

Chris Hurd (born November 30, 1980) is an American football coach and former player. He is the Special Teams Coordinator at Illinois. He was previously a special teams analyst at Arkansas and before that was the Special Teams Coordinator and fullbacks and H-backs coach at Akron.

== Playing career ==
Hurd played linebacker for North Texas from 1999 through 2003, while completing his degree in history, with a minor in criminal justice. After joining the team as a walk-on and redshirting in 1999, Hurd went on to earn a scholarship and become a four time letter-winner. He predominately played special teams and was a reserve middle linebacker in 2000 and 2001, and started at middle linebacker for his final two seasons. He was awarded the team’s Byron Gross Award (best linebacker) in both 2002 and 2003. Hurd was first-team All-Sun Belt, as well as the conference defensive player of the year, as a senior.

== Coaching career ==
=== North Texas ===
Following his playing career, Hurd immediately joined the coaching staff at North Texas as the graduate assistant. In 2004, he worked with the strength and conditioning staff before moving on the field in 2005 to coach the tight ends. He then moved to the defensive side of the ball to work with the secondary.

=== Cisco College ===
In 2007, Hurd joined the staff at Cisco College coaching the defensive backs. During Hurd’s four-year stay, he served as the defensive coordinator for three years and the special teams coordinator for two.

=== Tennessee ===
In 2011 and 2012, Hurd was on the Tennessee football strength and conditioning staff, where he helped develop five NFL draft picks, including Cordarrelle Patterson.

=== Arkansas ===
In 2013, Hurd joined the Arkansas football staff working as a special teams quality control coach.

=== Florida Atlantic ===
From 2014 to 2016, Hurd was the special teams coordinator and tight ends coach at Florida Atlantic.

Notable players under Hurd: Buddy Howell, Devin Singletary, Greg Joseph, Tyler Cameron. Hurd was also responsible for bringing Harrison Bryant to FAU, current tight end for the Cleveland Browns.

=== Chattanooga ===
In 2017, Hurd joined the staff at Chattanooga as the special teams coordinator and running backs coach.

=== Akron ===
In 2019, Hurd followed head coach Tom Arth from Chattanooga to Akron as the special teams coordinator. He also coached the fullbacks and H-backs.

== Personal life ==
Hurd and his wife, Emily, have four children: a son, Ryker, daughter, Landrie, and twin daughters Brynn and Bennett. Their daughter Bennett died at 17 days old. She was born with a life-limiting diagnosis, but lived for 17 days. The family raises annual support for the hospice center in her memory.
