= Joe Novak =

American football player and coach (1945–2026)

- Novak in 2007

Biographical details
- Born: April 19, 1945
- Died: July 28, 2026 (aged 81)

Playing career
- 1965–1966: Miami (OH)
- Position: Defensive end

Coaching career (HC unless noted)
- 1972–1973: Warren Western Reserve (OH)
- 1974–1976: Miami (OH) (DC/LB)
- 1977–1979: Illinois (DL)
- 1980–1983: Northern Illinois (DC/LB)
- 1984–1995: Indiana (DC/LB)
- 1996–2007: Northern Illinois

Head coaching record
- Overall: 63–76 (college); 23–1 (high school)
- Bowls: 1–1

Accomplishments and honors

Championships
- 3 MAC West Division (2002, 2004–2005)

Awards
- MAC Coach of the Year (2002)

Joe Novak (April 19, 1945 – July 28, 2026) was an American college football player and coach. He served as the head football coach at Northern Illinois University from 1996 to 2007, compiling a record of 63–76.

Novak played college football as a defensive end at Miami University under head coach Bo Schembechler. After beginning his coaching career in the high school ranks, Novak had stints as an assistant coach at Miami, the University of Illinois, Northern Illinois, and Indiana University. At Illinois, he served under head coach Gary Moeller, who had been one of the assistants at Miami under Schembechler. Novak was a longtime assistant of Bill Mallory, another Miami assistant coach and alum. Novak served on Mallory's staffs from 1980 to 1995.

During the 2003 season, Novak's Northern Illinois squad defeated three BCS conference teams: #13 Maryland, #21 Alabama in Tuscaloosa, and Iowa State. Winning their first seven games, the Huskies were ranked as high as #12 in the AP Poll, #14 in the Coaches' Poll, and #10 in the BCS rankings. In the 2004 season, Novak led the Huskies to a 9–3 record and their first bowl appearance in 21 years, winning the Silicon Valley Football Classic over Troy.

On November 26, 2007, Novak announced his retirement from coaching. "Winning is fragile," Novak said, "You've got to enjoy it when you're doing it....People have always said, 'You'll know when it's time,' and I believe that now is the time." His successor at Northern Illinois was Jerry Kill. Novak died on July 28, 2026, at the age of 81.

== Head coaching record ==
=== College ===
Year	Team	Overall	Conference	Standing	Bowl/playoffs
Northern Illinois Huskies (NCAA Division I-A independent) (1996)
1996	Northern Illinois	1–10		6th	
Northern Illinois Huskies (Mid-American Conference) (1997–2007)
1997	Northern Illinois	0–11	0–8	6th (West)	
1998	Northern Illinois	2–9	2–6	5th (West)	
1999	Northern Illinois	5–6	5–3	T–2nd (West)	
2000	Northern Illinois	6–5	4–3	T–3rd (West)	
2001	Northern Illinois	6–5	4–3	T–2nd (West)	
2002	Northern Illinois	8–4	7–1	T–1st (West)	
2003	Northern Illinois	10–2	6–2	T–2nd (West)	
2004	Northern Illinois	9–3	7–1	T–1st (West)	W Silicon Valley
2005	Northern Illinois	7–5	6–2	T–1st (West)	
2006	Northern Illinois	7–6	5–3	T–3rd (West)	L Poinsettia
2007	Northern Illinois	2–10	1–6	6th (West)	
Northern Illinois:		63–76	47–38		
Total:		63–76			
National championship Conference title Conference division title or championship game berth
