= Kevin Robinson (gridiron football) =

American gridiron football player (born 1984)

No. 14
- Position: Wide receiver

Personal information
- Born: December 19, 1984 (age 41); Fresno, California, U.S.
- Listed height: 5 ft 11 in (1.80 m)
- Listed weight: 196 lb (89 kg)

Career information
- High school: Herbert Hoover (Fresno)
- College: Utah State
- NFL draft: 2008: 6th round, 182nd overall pick

Career history
- Kansas City Chiefs (2008); Hamilton Tiger-Cats (2009)

Awards and highlights
- Second-team All-American (2007); First-team Freshman All-American (2004); First-team All-Sun Belt (2004)
- Stats at Pro Football Reference

Kevin Lee Robinson (born December 19, 1984) is an American former professional football wide receiver. He was selected by the Kansas City Chiefs in the sixth round of the 2008 NFL draft with the 182nd overall pick. He played college football at Utah State. He signed with the Hamilton Tiger-Cats on October 15, 2009.

His brother was Green Bay Packers assistant coach John Rushing.
