= Roderick Bryant =

American football player (born 1981)

No. 39
- Position: Defensive back

Personal information
- Born: February 17, 1981 (age 45); Washington, D.C., U.S.
- Listed height: 6 ft 1 in (1.85 m)
- Listed weight: 185 lb (84 kg)

Career information
- High school: Friendly (Fort Washington, Maryland)
- College: West Hills CC (2000–2001); Idaho (2002–2003)
- NFL draft: 2004: undrafted

Career history
- New York Jets (2004)

Awards and highlights
- Second-team All-Sun Belt (2003)
- Stats at Pro Football Reference

Roderick Bryant (born February 17, 1981) is an American former professional football linebacker who played one season with the New York Jets of the National Football League (NFL). He played college football at West Hills College Coalinga and Idaho.

== Early life and college ==
Roderick Bryant was born on February 17, 1981, in Washington, D.C. He attended Friendly High School in Fort Washington, Maryland.

Bryant first played college football at West Hills College Coalinga from 2000 to 2001. He then transferred to the University of Idaho, where he was a two-year letterman for the Idaho Vandals from 2002 to 2003. He was an on-and-off starter during his two years with the Vandals. Bryant earned second-team All-Sun Belt honors in 2003.

== Professional career ==
After going undrafted in the 2004 NFL draft, Bryant signed with the New York Jets on April 30, 2004. He played in 13 games for the Jets during the 2004 season, recording four solo tackles and one pass breakup. He was released on March 2, 2005.

== Personal life ==
Bryant went by "Rod Bryant" until his senior year at Idaho in 2003, when his mother wanted him to start going by his full name of Roderick Bryant.
