= 2004 Utah State Aggies football team =

American college football season

2004 Utah State Aggies football
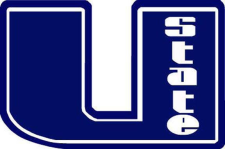
- Conference: Sun Belt Conference
- Record: 3–8 (2–5 Sun Belt)
- Head coach: Mick Dennehy (5th season)
- Offensive coordinator: Bob Cole (5th season)
- Defensive coordinator: David Kotulski (2nd season)
- Home stadium: Romney Stadium

2004 Sun Belt Conference football standings
| | Conf. | | | Overall |
| Team | W | | L | W | | L |
|---|---|---|---|---|---|---|
| North Texas $ | 7 | – | 0 | 7 | – | 5 |
| Troy State | 4 | – | 2 | 7 | – | 5 |
| New Mexico State | 3 | – | 2 | 5 | – | 6 |
| Middle Tennessee | 4 | – | 4 | 5 | – | 6 |
| Louisiana–Monroe | 3 | – | 3 | 5 | – | 6 |
| Arkansas State | 3 | – | 4 | 3 | – | 8 |
| Louisiana–Lafayette | 2 | – | 5 | 4 | – | 7 |
| Utah State | 2 | – | 5 | 3 | – | 8 |
| Idaho | 2 | – | 5 | 3 | – | 9 |
$ – Conference champion

The 2004 Utah State Aggies football team represented Utah State University as a member of the Sun Belt Conference in 2004 NCAA Division I-A football season. The Aggies were led by fifth-year head coach Mick Dennehy and played their home games in Romney Stadium in Logan, Utah.

== Schedule ==
| Date | Time | Opponent | Site | TV | Result | Attendance |
|---|---|---|---|---|---|---|
| September 4 | 5:00 p.m. | at Alabama* | Bryant–Denny Stadium; Tuscaloosa, AL | PPV | L 17–48 | 82,033 |
| September 11 | 6:00 p.m. | Idaho | Romney Stadium; Logan, UT | | W 14–7 | 20,117 |
| September 18 | 5:00 p.m. | No. 15 Utah* | Romney Stadium; Logan, UT (Battle of the Brothers) | KJZZ | L 6–48 | 24,750 |
| September 25 | 8:00 p.m. | at UNLV* | Sam Boyd Stadium; Whitney, NV | SPW | W 31–21 | 19,116 |
| October 2 | 1:05 p.m. | at Troy State | Movie Gallery Stadium; Troy, AL | | L 21–48 | 20,029 |
| October 9 | 6:05 p.m. | North Texas | Romney Stadium; Logan, UT | | L 23–31 | 17,895 |
| October 16 | 12:00 p.m. | at Clemson* | Memorial Stadium; Clemson, SC | | L 6–35 | 77,500 |
| October 30 | 1:00 p.m. | at Middle Tennessee | Johnny "Red" Floyd Stadium; Murfreesboro, TN | | L 0–21 | 14,208 |
| November 6 | 5:30 p.m. | at Louisiana–Monroe | Malone Stadium; Monroe, LA | | L 25–32 | 16,208 |
| November 11 | 5:00 p.m. | at Arkansas State | Indian Stadium; Jonesboro, AR | | L 7-16 | 7,862 |
| November 20 | 1:05 p.m. | New Mexico State | Romney Stadium; Logan, UT | | W 34–25 | 15,238 |
*Non-conference game; Rankings from AP Poll released prior to the game; All times are in Mountain time
