= 2004 Troy State Trojans football team =

American college football season

2004 Troy State Trojans football

Silicon Valley Football Classic, L 21–34 vs. Northern Illinois
- Conference: Sun Belt Conference
- Record: 7–5 (4–2 Sun Belt)
- Head coach: Larry Blakeney (14th season)
- Offensive coordinator: Mark Fleetwood (2nd season)
- Offensive scheme: I formation
- Defensive coordinator: Vic Koenning (2nd season)
- Base defense: 4–3
- Home stadium: Movie Gallery Stadium

2004 Sun Belt Conference football standings
	Conf.			Overall
Team	W		L	W		L
North Texas $	7	–	0	7	–	5
Troy State	4	–	2	7	–	5
New Mexico State	3	–	2	5	–	6
Middle Tennessee	4	–	4	5	–	6
Louisiana–Monroe	3	–	3	5	–	6
Arkansas State	3	–	4	3	–	8
Louisiana–Lafayette	2	–	5	4	–	7
Utah State	2	–	5	3	–	8
Idaho	2	–	5	3	–	9
$ – Conference champion

The 2004 Troy State Trojans football team represented Troy State University—now known as Troy University—as a first-year member of the Sun Belt Conference during the 2004 NCAA Division I-A football season. Led by 14th-year head coach Larry Blakeney, the Trojans compiled an overall record of 7–5 with a mark of 4–2 in conference play, good for second place in the Sun Belt. Troy State was invited to their first bowl game the Silicon Valley Football Classic, where the Trojans lost, 34–21, to Northern Illinois. The team played home games at Movie Gallery Stadium in Troy, Alabama.

== Schedule ==
Date	Opponent	Site	TV	Result	Attendance	Source
September 4	at Marshall*	Joan C. Edwards Stadium; Huntington, WV	ESPN Plus	W 17–15	29,382	
September 9	No. 19 Missouri*	Movie Gallery Stadium; Troy, AL	ESPN2	W 24–14	26,574	
September 18	at New Mexico State	Aggie Memorial Stadium; Las Cruces, NM	ESPN Plus	L 18–22	17,587	
September 25	at South Carolina*	Williams–Brice Stadium; Columbia, SC	ESPN Plus	L 7-17	79,700	
October 2	Utah State	Movie Gallery Stadium; Troy, AL	ESPN Plus	W 49-21	20,029	
October 16	at Arkansas State	Indian Stadium; Jonesboro, AR		L 9–13	16,135	
October 23	No. 18 LSU*	Tiger Stadium; Baton Rouge, LA	ESPN Plus	L 20–24	89,493	
October 30	Idaho^{†}	Movie Gallery Stadium; Troy, AL		W 47–7	20,151	
November 6	Florida Atlantic*	Movie Gallery Stadium; Troy, AL		W 24–6	20,515	
November 13	at Louisiana–Lafayette	Cajun Field; Lafayette, LA		W 13–10	15,077	
November 20	Middle Tennessee	Movie Gallery Stadium; Troy, AL (Battle for the Palladium)	ESPN Plus	W 37–17	18,871	
December 30	vs. Northern Illinois*	Spartan Stadium; San Jose, CA (Silicon Valley Football Classic)	ESPN2	L 21–34	21,456	
*Non-conference game; ^{†}Homecoming; Rankings from AP Poll released prior to the game
