= 2004 Sun Belt Conference football season =

- League: NCAA Division I FBS
- Sport: football
- Duration: August 28, 2004 through January 6, 2004
- Teams: 9
- TV partner: ESPN

2005 NFL Draft
- Top draft pick: DeMarcus Ware
- Picked by: Dallas Cowboys, 11th overall

Regular season
- Champion: North Texas
- Season MVP: Jamario Thomas

Football seasons
- 2003 2005

2004 Sun Belt Conference football standings
	Conf.			Overall
Team	W		L	W		L
North Texas $	7	–	0	7	–	5
Troy State	4	–	2	7	–	5
New Mexico State	3	–	2	5	–	6
Middle Tennessee	4	–	4	5	–	6
Louisiana–Monroe	3	–	3	5	–	6
Arkansas State	3	–	4	3	–	8
Louisiana–Lafayette	2	–	5	4	–	7
Utah State	2	–	5	3	–	8
Idaho	2	–	5	3	–	9
$ – Conference champion

The 2004 Sun Belt Conference football season was an NCAA football season that was played from August 28, 2004, to January 6, 2005.

== Players of the Year ==
2004 Sun Belt Player of the Year awards

Award	Player	School
Player of the Year	Jamario Thomas	North Texas
Offensive Player of the Year	Jamario Thomas	North Texas
Defensive Player of the Year	DeMarcus Ware	Troy
Newcomer of the Year	Dylan Lineberry	North Texas
Freshman of the Year	Jamario Thomas	North Texas
Coach of the Year	Darrell Dickey	North Texas

== All-Conference Team ==
Coaches All-Conference Selections

Position	Player	Team
First-team Offense
QB	Buck Pierce	New Mexico State
RB	DeWhitt Betterson	Troy State
RB	Jamario Thomas	North Texas
WR	Bobby Bernal-Wood	Idaho
WR	Kerry Wright	Middle Tennessee
TE	Andy Blount	North Texas
OL	Andy Brewster	North Texas
OL	Steven Gibbs	Arkansas State
OL	Bruce Hampton	UL Monroe
OL	Junior Louissaint	Troy State
OL	Steve Subia	New Mexico State
First-team Defense
DL	Adrian Awasom	North Texas
DL	Aubrey Dorisme	New Mexico State
DL	Brandon Guillory	UL Monroe
DL	DeMarcus Ware	Troy State
LB	Jim Cottrell	New Mexico State
LB	Cole Snyder	Idaho
LB	Josh Williams	Arkansas State
DB	Derrick Ansley	Troy State
DB	C. C. Brown	UL Lafayette
DB	Jonas Buckles	North Texas
DB	Chris Harris	UL Monroe
First-team Special Teams
K	Nick Bazaldua	North Texas
P	Joel Stelly	UL Monroe
RS	Kevin Robinson	Utah State
All-purpose	Johnny Quinn	North Texas

Position	Player	Team
Second-team Offense
QB	Scott Hall	North Texas
RB	Jayson Bird	Idaho
RB	Antonio Warren	Arkansas State
WR	Johnny Quinn	North Texas
WR	Bill Sampy	UL Lafayette
TE	Andrew Mooney	New Mexico State
OL	Lonnie Chambers	North Texas
OL	Nick Cole	New Mexico State
OL	Dylan Lineberry	North Texas
OL	Quinton Staton	Middle Tennessee
OL	Henry Tellis	Troy State
Second-team Defense
DL	Evan Cardwell	North Texas
DL	Michael Pruitt	North Texas
DL	Eric Thomas	Troy State
DL	Ronald Tupea	Utah State
LB	Bernard Davis	Troy State
LB	Robby Farmer	Troy State
LB	John Winchester	UL Monroe
DB	Johnny Faulk	Troy State
DB	Matt Griebel	New Mexico State
DB	Tyrell Johnson	Arkansas State
DB	Markeith Knowlton	North Texas
Second-team Special Teams
K	Colby Smith	Middle Tennessee
P	Thomas Olmsted	Troy State
RS	Leodis McKelvin	Troy State
All-purpose	Kevin Robinson	Utah State
