= 2004 New Orleans Bowl =

2004 Wyndham New Orleans Bowl
| Southern Miss Golden Eagles | North Texas Mean Green |
| (6–5) | (7–4) |
| C-USA | Sun Belt |
| 31 | 10 |
| Head coach: Jeff Bower | Head coach: Darrell Dickey |
| | 1 | 2 | 3 | 4 | Total |
|---|---|---|---|---|---|
| Southern Miss | 14 | 3 | 0 | 14 | 31 |
| North Texas | 0 | 3 | 0 | 7 | 10 |
- Date: December 14, 2004
- Season: 2004
- Stadium: Louisiana Superdome
- Location: New Orleans, Louisiana
- MVP: Southern Miss LB Michael Boley
- Referee: Todd Geerlings (MAC)
- Attendance: 27,253
- Payout: US$750,000 per team

United States TV coverage
- Network: ESPN
- Announcers: Dave Barnett (Play-by-Play); Bill Curry (Analyst); David Norrie (Analyst)

The 2004 Wyndham New Orleans Bowl featured the North Texas Mean Green and the Southern Miss Golden Eagles. It was North Texas's fourth consecutive New Orleans Bowl appearance.

Southern Miss quarterback Dustin Almond got Southern Miss on the board first with a 37-yard touchdown pass to wide receiver Otho Graves, to give the Eagles an early 7–0 lead. Later in the first quarter, Dustin Almond scored on a 1-yard touchdown run to increase the lead to 14–0. In the second quarter, kicker Nick Bazaldua got North Texas on the board with a 24-yard field goal to make it 14–3. Before halftime, Darren McCaleb connected on a 45-yard field goal to give USM a 17–3 halftime lead.

In the fourth quarter, linebacker Michael Boley returned an interception 62 yards for a touchdown to give Southern Miss a 24–3 lead. Sherron Moore added a 1-yard touchdown pass to increase the lead to 31–3. Quarterback Scott Hall threw an 11-yard touchdown pass to Johnny Quinn to cut the lead to 31–10. That would be the final score of the game.
