= 2004 Louisiana–Monroe Indians football team =

American college football season

2004 Louisiana–Monroe Indians football
- Conference: Sun Belt Conference
- Record: 5–6 (3–3 Sun Belt)
- Head coach: Charlie Weatherbie (2nd season)
- Offensive coordinator: Todd Berry (1st season)
- Defensive coordinator: Bob Trott (2nd season)
- Home stadium: Malone Stadium

2004 Sun Belt Conference football standings
	Conf.			Overall
Team	W		L	W		L
North Texas $	7	–	0	7	–	5
Troy State	4	–	2	7	–	5
New Mexico State	3	–	2	5	–	6
Middle Tennessee	4	–	4	5	–	6
Louisiana–Monroe	3	–	3	5	–	6
Arkansas State	3	–	4	3	–	8
Louisiana–Lafayette	2	–	5	4	–	7
Utah State	2	–	5	3	–	8
Idaho	2	–	5	3	–	9
$ – Conference champion

The 2004 Louisiana–Monroe Indians football team represented the University of Louisiana at Monroe in the 2004 NCAA Division I-A college football season. The Indians offense scored 211 points while the defense allowed 303 points.

== Schedule ==
Date	Time	Opponent	Site	TV	Result	Attendance
September 4	1:30 pm	at No. 17 Auburn*	Jordan–Hare Stadium; Auburn, AL	PPV	L 0–31	80,663
September 18	6:00 pm	at Arkansas*	War Memorial Stadium; Little Rock, AR		L 20–49	55,652
September 25	6:30 pm	Arkansas State	Malone Stadium; Monroe, LA		L 21–28	18,809
October 2	12:00 pm	at Wyoming*	War Memorial Stadium; Laramie, WY		L 10–31	12,125
October 9	3:05 pm	at Idaho	Kibbie Dome; Moscow, ID		W 16–14	11,798
October 16	2:30 pm	Florida International*	Malone Stadium; Monroe, LA		W 28–20	14,496
October 23	3:00 pm	at Florida Atlantic*	Lockhart Stadium; Fort Lauderdale, FL		W 17–13	12,557
October 30	6:05 pm	at North Texas	Fouts Field; Denton, TX	ESPN+	L 30–45	10,893
November 6	6:30 pm	Utah State	Malone Stadium; Monroe, LA		W 32–25	16,208
November 13	2:05 pm	at Middle Tennessee	Johnny "Red" Floyd Stadium; Murfreesboro, TN		L 24–37	9,214
November 20	6:30 pm	Louisiana–Lafayette	Malone Stadium; Monroe, LA (Battle on the Bayou)		W 13–10	9,356
*Non-conference game; Rankings from AP Poll released prior to the game; All times are in Central time

== Coaching staff ==
2004 Louisiana–Monroe Indians football staff
Coaching staff: Charlie Weatherbie – Head Coach; Bob Leahy – Assistant head coach/wide receivers; Todd Berry – Offensive coordinator/quarterbacks; Bob Trott – Defensive coordinator/safeties; Steve Farmer – Offensive line; Greg Jackson – Defensive backs; Manny Michel – Defensive line; Danilo Robinson – Linebackers; Junior Smith – Running backs; Luke Wells – Tight ends	Support staff: Josh Brooks – Director of Football Operations; Kyle Caskey – Graduate Assistant; Daniel Da Prato – Graduate Assistant; Strength and conditioning staff: Kim Sword – Head Strength and Conditioning
