= Jake Scott (guard) =

American gridiron football player (born 1981)

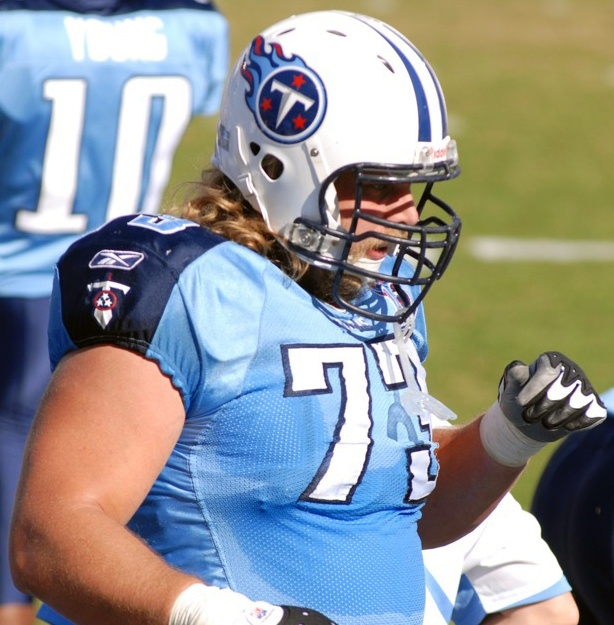
- Scott with the Tennessee Titans in 2008

No. 73, 64
- Position: Guard

Personal information
- Born: April 16, 1981 (age 45); Lewiston, Idaho, U.S.
- Listed height: 6 ft 5 in (1.96 m)
- Listed weight: 295 lb (134 kg)

Career information
- High school: Lewiston
- College: Idaho
- NFL draft: 2004: 5th round, 141st overall pick

Career history
- Indianapolis Colts (2004–2007); Tennessee Titans (2008–2011); Philadelphia Eagles (2012); Detroit Lions (2013)*
- * Offseason or practice squad member only

Awards and highlights
- Super Bowl champion (XLI); 2× Second-team All-Sun Belt (2001, 2003)

Career NFL statistics
- Games played: 131
- Games started: 128
- Fumble recoveries: 3
- Stats at Pro Football Reference

Jake Ross Scott (born April 16, 1981) is an American former professional football player who was an offensive guard in the National Football League (NFL). Scott played college football for the Idaho Vandals, where he walked-on and became a four-year starter and was selected by the Indianapolis Colts in the fifth round of the 2004 NFL draft. Scott won Super Bowl XLI with the Colts. He also played for the Tennessee Titans and Philadelphia Eagles and was a member of the Detroit Lions before his retirement.

== Early life ==
Born and raised in Lewiston, Idaho, Scott graduated from Lewiston High in 1999. He played all four years for the Bengals and threw the discus and shot put on the track team.

== College career ==
He played college football at the University of Idaho, where he walked-on and redshirted his first year. He was a four-year starter for the Vandals (2000–03), starting in 46 games left tackle for head coach Tom Cable. Scott earned a bachelor's degree in civil engineering in 2003.

== Professional career ==
=== Indianapolis Colts ===
In the 2004 NFL draft, Scott was selected in the fifth round with the 141st selection. He started nine games in his rookie year and was selected for the 2004 Football Digest All-Rookie Team. Scott started all 16 games in 2005 and 2006, including the playoffs and Super Bowl XLI, a victory over the Chicago Bears in February 2007.

=== Tennessee Titans ===
Following four seasons with the Colts, he signed a four-year deal with the Tennessee Titans on March 10, 2008, worth approximately $5 million per season.

=== Philadelphia Eagles ===
On November 12, 2012, the Eagles signed Scott and released Julian Vandervelde.

=== Detroit Lions ===
Scott signed with the Detroit Lions on June 4, 2013. He was cut on August 31, 2013, as part of the final round of cuts before the 2013 season.
