= 2003 Louisiana–Lafayette Ragin' Cajuns football team =

American college football season

2003 Louisiana–Lafayette Ragin' Cajuns football
- Conference: Sun Belt Conference
- Record: 4–8 (4–3 Sun Belt)
- Head coach: Rickey Bustle (2nd season)
- Offensive coordinator: Rob Christophel (2nd season)
- Defensive coordinator: Brent Pry (2nd season)
- Home stadium: Cajun Field

2003 Sun Belt Conference football standings
	Conf.			Overall
Team	W		L	W		L
North Texas $	7	–	0	9	–	4
Louisiana–Lafayette	3	–	2	4	–	8
Arkansas State	3	–	3	5	–	7
Middle Tennessee	3	–	3	4	–	8
Utah State	3	–	3	3	–	9
Idaho	3	–	4	3	–	9
New Mexico State	2	–	5	3	–	9
Louisiana–Monroe	1	–	5	1	–	11
$ – Conference champion

The 2003 Louisiana–Lafayette Ragin' Cajuns football team represented the University of Louisiana at Lafayette as a member of the Sun Belt Conference in the 2003 NCAA Division I-A football season. They were led by second-year head coach Rickey Bustle and played their home games at Cajun Field in Lafayette, Louisiana.

== Schedule ==
Date	Time	Opponent	Site	Result	Attendance	Source
August 30	6:00 p.m.	at South Carolina*	Williams-Brice Stadium; Columbia, SC	L 7–14	82,227	
September 6	7:00 p.m.	Louisiana Tech*	Cajun Field; Lafayette, LA	L 3–34	24,211	
September 13	7:00 p.m.	Houston*	Cajun Field; Lafayette, LA	L 14–21	11,127	
September 20	7:00 p.m.	at Minnesota*	Hubert H. Humphrey Metrodome; Minneapolis, MN	L 14–48	34,929	
September 27	3:00 p.m.	at North Texas	Fouts Field; Denton, TX	L 23–44	17,239	
October 4	6:00 p.m.	at Oklahoma State*	Boone Pickens Stadium; Stillwater, OK	L 3–56	44,700	
October 11	4:00 p.m.	Louisiana–Monroe	Malone Stadium; Monroe, LA (Battle on the Bayou)	L 42–45	13,540	
October 16	6:00 p.m.	New Mexico State	Cajun Field; Lafayette, LA	W 26–24	12,308	
October 25	4:00 p.m.	Idaho	Cajun Field; Lafayette, LA	W 31–20	9,213	
November 1	2:00 p.m.	at Southern Miss*	M. M. Roberts Stadium; Hattiesburg, MS	L 3–48	25,649	
November 8		FIU*	Cajun Field; Lafayette, LA	W 43–10	13,571	
November 15		at Middle Tennessee State	Johnny "Red" Floyd Stadium; Murfreesboro, TN	W 57–51 ^{4OT}		
*Non-conference game; All times are in Central time
