= 2003 Arkansas State Indians football team =

American college football season

2003 Arkansas State Indians football
- Conference: Sun Belt Conference
- Record: 5–7 (3–3 Sun Belt)
- Head coach: Steve Roberts (2nd season)
- Offensive coordinator: Doug Ruse (2nd season)
- Co-defensive coordinators: Kevin Corless (2nd season); Jack Curtis (2nd season)
- Home stadium: Indian Stadium

2003 Sun Belt Conference football standings
	Conf.			Overall
Team	W		L	W		L
North Texas $	7	–	0	9	–	4
Louisiana–Lafayette	3	–	2	4	–	8
Arkansas State	3	–	3	5	–	7
Middle Tennessee	3	–	3	4	–	8
Utah State	3	–	3	3	–	9
Idaho	3	–	4	3	–	9
New Mexico State	2	–	5	3	–	9
Louisiana–Monroe	1	–	5	1	–	11
$ – Conference champion

The 2003 Arkansas State Indians football team represented Arkansas State University as a member of the Sun Belt Conference the 2003 NCAA Division I-A football season. Led by second-year head coach Steve Roberts, the Indians compiled an overall record of 5–7 with a mark of 3–3 in conference play, placing in a three-way tie for third in the Sun Belt.

== Schedule ==
Date	Time	Opponent	Site	TV	Result	Attendance
August 30	7:00 p.m.	at Texas A&M*	Kyle Field; College Station, TX		L 11–26	75,804
September 6	6:00 p.m.	Tennessee–Martin*	Indian Stadium; Jonesboro, AR		W 63–6	20,548
September 13	6:00 p.m.	Southeast Missouri State*^{†}	Indian Stadium; Jonesboro, AR		W 21–3	21,134
September 20	6:00 p.m.	at Tulsa*	Skelly Stadium; Tulsa, OK		L 7–54	16,231
September 27	1:00 p.m.	at Memphis*	Liberty Bowl Memorial Stadium; Memphis, TN (Paint Bucket Bowl)		L 38–16	38,093
October 4	6:00 p.m.	Louisiana–Monroe	War Memorial Stadium; Little Rock, AR		W 44–41	20,135
October 11	1:00 p.m.	at Ole Miss*	Vaught–Hemingway Stadium; Oxford, MS		L 0–55	51,286
October 25	2:00 p.m.	at Utah State	Romney Stadium; Logan, UT		L 0–49	12,516
November 1	5:00 p.m.	at New Mexico State	Aggie Memorial Stadium; Las Cruces, NM	ESPN Plus	W 28–24	19,702
November 8	2:00 p.m.	Idaho	Indian Stadium; Jonesboro, AR		W 24–23	12,839
November 15	11:00 a.m.	at North Texas	Fouts Field; Denton, TX		L 14–58	16,394
November 20	6:00 p.m.	Middle Tennessee	Indian Stadium; Jonesboro, AR	ESPN Plus	L 14–24	12,783
*Non-conference game; ^{†}Homecoming; All times are in Central time
