= 2003 Middle Tennessee Blue Raiders football team =

American college football season

2003 Middle Tennessee Blue Raiders football
- Conference: Sun Belt Conference
- Record: 4–8 (3–3 Sun Belt)
- Head coach: Andy McCollum (5th season)
- Co-offensive coordinators: Darin Hinshaw (3rd season); Blake Anderson (2nd season)
- Defensive coordinator: Steve Davis (3rd season)
- Home stadium: Johnny "Red" Floyd Stadium

2003 Sun Belt Conference football standings
	Conf.			Overall
Team	W		L	W		L
North Texas $	7	–	0	9	–	4
Louisiana–Lafayette	3	–	2	4	–	8
Arkansas State	3	–	3	5	–	7
Middle Tennessee	3	–	3	4	–	8
Utah State	3	–	3	3	–	9
Idaho	3	–	4	3	–	9
New Mexico State	2	–	5	3	–	9
Louisiana–Monroe	1	–	5	1	–	11
$ – Conference champion

The 2003 Middle Tennessee Blue Raiders football team represented Middle Tennessee State University as a member of the Sun Belt Conference during the 2003 NCAA Division I FBS football season. Led by fifth-year head coach Andy McCollum, the Blue Raiders compiled an overall record of 4–8 record with a mark of 3–3 in conference play, placing in a three-way tie for third in the Sun Belt.

== Schedule ==
Date	Time	Opponent	Site	TV	Result	Attendance
August 28	7:00 p.m.	Florida Atlantic*	Johnny "Red" Floyd Stadium; Murfreesboro, TN		L 19–20	23,261
September 6	12:00 p.m.	at Georgia*	Sanford Stadium; Athens, GA		L 10–29	82,034
September 13	4:00 p.m.	at Clemson*	Memorial Stadium; Clemson, SC		L 14–37	73,197
September 20	1:00 p.m.	at No. 23 Missouri*	Faurot Field; Columbia, MO		L 40–41 ^{OT}	55,075
October 4	6:00 p.m.	Temple*	Johnny "Red" Floyd Stadium; Murfreesboro, TN		L 36–44	13,829
October 11	2:00 p.m.	New Mexico State	Johnny "Red" Floyd Stadium; Murfreesboro, TN		W 35–18	9,114
October 18	8:00 p.m.	at Idaho	Kibbie Dome; Moscow, ID		W 28–21 ^{OT}	18,624
October 25	6:00 p.m.	North Texas	Johnny "Red" Floyd Stadium; Murfreesboro, TN	ESPN	L 28–33	9,049
November 1	8:00 p.m.	at Utah State	Romney Stadium; Logan, UT		L 20–41	6,988
November 8		Troy State*	Johnny "Red" Floyd Stadium; Murfreesboro, TN (Battle for the Palladium)		W 27–20	6,563
November 15		Louisiana–Lafayette	Johnny "Red" Floyd Stadium; Murfreesboro, TN		L 51–57 ^{4OT}	4,311
November 20	6:00 p.m.	at Arkansas State	Indian Stadium; Jonesboro, AR	ESPN+	W 24–14	12,783
*Non-conference game; Rankings from Coaches' Poll released prior to the game; All times are in Central time
