= 2004 Arkansas State Indians football team =

American college football season

2004 Arkansas State Indians football
- Conference: Sun Belt Conference
- Record: 3–8 (3–4 Sun Belt)
- Head coach: Steve Roberts (3rd season)
- Offensive coordinator: Doug Ruse (3rd season)
- Co-defensive coordinators: Kevin Corless (3rd season); Jack Curtis (3rd season)
- Home stadium: Indian Stadium

2004 Sun Belt Conference football standings
	Conf.			Overall
Team	W		L	W		L
North Texas $	7	–	0	7	–	5
Troy State	4	–	2	7	–	5
New Mexico State	3	–	2	5	–	6
Middle Tennessee	4	–	4	5	–	6
Louisiana–Monroe	3	–	3	5	–	6
Arkansas State	3	–	4	3	–	8
Louisiana–Lafayette	2	–	5	4	–	7
Utah State	2	–	5	3	–	8
Idaho	2	–	5	3	–	9
$ – Conference champion

The 2004 Arkansas State Indians football team represented Arkansas State University as a member of the Sun Belt Conference the 2004 NCAA Division I-A football season. Led by third-year head coach Steve Roberts, the Indians compiled an overall record of 3–8 with a mark of 3–4 in conference play, placing sixth in the Sun Belt.

== Schedule ==
Date	Time	Opponent	Site	TV	Result	Attendance	Source
September 4	6:00 p.m.	at No. 18 Missouri*	Faurot Field; Columbia, MO		L 20–52	57,012	
September 11	7:00 p.m.	at No. 6 LSU*	Tiger Stadium; Baton Rouge, LA	PPV	L 3–53	91,611	
September 18	6:00 p.m.	No. 25 Memphis*	Indian Stadium; Jonesboro, AR (Paint Bucket Bowl)		L 35–47	30,427	
September 25	6:30 p.m.	at Louisiana–Monroe	Malone Stadium; Monroe, LA		W 28–21	18,809	
October 2	1:00 p.m.	at Ole Miss*	Vaught–Hemingway Stadium; Oxford, MS		L 21–28	54,676	
October 9	3:00 p.m.	at Middle Tennessee	Johnny "Red" Floyd Stadium; Murfreesboro, TN		L 17–45	13,250	
October 16	6:00 p.m.	Troy^{†}	Indian Stadium; Jonesboro, AR		W 13–9	16,135	
October 23	4:00 p.m.	at Louisiana–Lafayette	Cajun Field; Lafayette, LA		L 24–27	23,121	
November 6	4:00 p.m.	at Idaho	Martin Stadium; Pullman, WA		L 45–31	9,425	
November 11	6:00 p.m.	Utah State	Indian Stadium; Jonesboro, AR		W 16–7	7,862	
November 18	6:00 p.m.	North Texas	Indian Stadium; Jonesboro, AR	ESPN Plus	L 7–31	6,883	
*Non-conference game; ^{†}Homecoming; Rankings from AP Poll released prior to the game; All times are in Central time
