= 2004 Middle Tennessee Blue Raiders football team =

American college football season

2004 Middle Tennessee Blue Raiders football
- Conference: Sun Belt Conference
- Record: 5–6 (4–4 Sun Belt)
- Head coach: Andy McCollum (6th season)
- Co-offensive coordinators: Blake Anderson (3rd season); Darin Hinshaw (4th season)
- Defensive coordinator: Bradley Dale Peveto (1st season)
- Home stadium: Johnny "Red" Floyd Stadium

2004 Sun Belt Conference football standings
	Conf.			Overall
Team	W		L	W		L
North Texas $	7	–	0	7	–	5
Troy State	4	–	2	7	–	5
New Mexico State	3	–	2	5	–	6
Middle Tennessee	4	–	4	5	–	6
Louisiana–Monroe	3	–	3	5	–	6
Arkansas State	3	–	4	3	–	8
Louisiana–Lafayette	2	–	5	4	–	7
Utah State	2	–	5	3	–	8
Idaho	2	–	5	3	–	9
$ – Conference champion

The 2004 Middle Tennessee Blue Raiders football team represented Middle Tennessee State University as a member of the Sun Belt Conference during the 2004 NCAA Division I FBS football season. Led by sixth-year head coach Andy McCollum, the Blue Raiders compiled an overall record of 5–6 with a mark of 4–4 in conference play, tying for fourth in the Sun Belt. Middle Tennessee played home games at Johnny "Red" Floyd Stadium in Murfreesboro, Tennessee.

== Schedule ==
Date	Time	Opponent	Site	TV	Result	Attendance	Source
September 11	5:00 p.m.	at Akron*	Rubber Bowl; Akron, OH		W 31–24	17,263	
September 18	2:00 p.m.	Florida Atlantic*	Johnny "Red" Floyd Stadium; Murfreesboro, TN		L 20–27	13,348	
September 25	6:00 p.m.	at Louisiana–Lafayette	Cajun Field; Lafayette, LA		L 17–24	25,083	
October 2	6:05 p.m.	at North Texas	Fouts Field; Denton, TX		L 21–30	15,913	
October 9	3:00 p.m.	Arkansas State	Johnny "Red" Floyd Stadium; Murfreesboro, TN		W 45–17	13,250	
October 16	6:00 p.m.	at No. 22 Florida*	Ben Hill Griffin Stadium; Gainesville, FL		L 16–52	90,018	
October 23	2:00 pm.	Idaho	Johnny "Red" Floyd Stadium; Murfreesboro, TN		W 34–14	16,918	
October 30	2:00 p.m.	Utah State	Johnny "Red" Floyd Stadium; Murfreesboro, TN		W 21–0	14,208	
November 6	7:05 p.m.	at New Mexico State	Aggie Memorial Stadium; Las Cruces, NM		L 10–44	18,485	
November 13	2:00 p.m.	Louisiana–Monroe	Johnny "Red" Floyd Stadium; Murfreesboro, TN		W 37–24	9,214	
November 20	6:00 p.m.	at Troy State	Movie Gallery Stadium; Troy, AL (Battle for the Palladium)	ESPN+	L 17–37	18,871	
*Non-conference game; Rankings from AP Poll released prior to the game; All times are in Central time
