= 2003 Sun Belt Conference football season =

- League: NCAA Division I FBS (Football Bowl Subdivision)
- Sport: football
- Duration: August 28, 2003 through January 6, 2004
- Teams: 8
- TV partner: ESPN

2004 NFL Draft
- Top draft pick: Chris Cooley
- Picked by: Washington Redskins, 81st overall

Regular season
- Champion: North Texas
- Season MVP: Brandon Kennedy

Football seasons
- 2002 2004

2003 Sun Belt Conference football standings
	Conf.			Overall
Team	W		L	W		L
North Texas $	7	–	0	9	–	4
Louisiana–Lafayette	3	–	2	4	–	8
Arkansas State	3	–	3	5	–	7
Middle Tennessee	3	–	3	4	–	8
Utah State	3	–	3	3	–	9
Idaho	3	–	4	3	–	9
New Mexico State	2	–	5	3	–	9
Louisiana–Monroe	1	–	5	1	–	11
$ – Conference champion

The 2003 Sun Belt Conference football season was an NCAA football season that was played from August 28, 2003, to January 6, 2004.

== Awards and honors ==
=== Individual award winners ===
Award	Player	Team
Player of the Year	Brandon Kennedy	North Texas
Offensive Player of the Year	Patrick Cobbs	North Texas
Defensive Player of the Year	Chris Hurd	North Texas
Coach of the Year	Darrell Dickey	North Texas
Freshman of the Year	Kevin Payne	UL Monroe
Newcomer of the Year	Aubrey Dorisme	New Mexico State

=== All-Conference teams ===
Position	Player	Team
First-team Offense
QB	Scott Hall	North Texas
RB	Patrick Cobbs*	North Texas
RB	Zach Gerstner	Idaho
WR	Fred Stamps*	UL Lafayette
WR	Kerry Wright	Middle Tennessee
TE	Chris Cooley	Utah State
OL	Andy Brewster	North Texas
OL	Kimani Jones	Arkansas State
OL	Steve Subia*	New Mexico State
OL	Brandon Westbrook	Middle Tennessee
OL	Nick Zuñiga	North Texas
First-team Defense
DL	Adrian Awasom	North Texas
DL	Jon Bradley	Arkansas State
DL	Antonio Floyd	UL Lafayette
DL	Brandon Kennedy*	North Texas
LB	Les Echols	Arkansas State
LB	Chris Hurd	North Texas
LB	Cody Spencer	North Texas
DB	Jonas Buckles	North Texas
DB	Jonathan Burke*	Arkansas State
DB	Chris Harris	UL Monroe
DB	Craig Jones*	North Texas
First-team Special Teams
K	Sean Comiskey	UL Lafayette
P	Joel Stelly	UL Monroe
RS	Charles Estes	UL Monroe
All-purpose	David Fiefia	Utah State

* = Denotes unanimous selection

Position	Player	Team
Second-team Offense
QB	Travis Cox	Utah State
RB	David Fiefia	Utah State
RB	Kevin Payne	UL Monroe
WR	Ronshay Jenkins	New Mexico State
WR	Mack Vincent	UL Monroe
TE	Mike McCoy	Idaho
OL	D'Anthony Batiste	UL Lafayette
OL	Bruce Hampton	UL Monroe
OL	Trevor Hutton	Utah State
OL	Matt Martinez	Idaho
OL	Jake Scott	Idaho
Second-team Defense
DL	Brian Howard	Idaho
DL	Ronald Tupea	Utah State
DL	Demetrios Walker	Middle Tennessee
DL	Corey Williams	Arkansas State
LB	Taylor Casey	North Texas
LB	Maurice Sonnier	UL Monroe
LB	Robert Watts	Utah State
DB	C. C. Brown	UL Lafayette
DB	Roderick Bryant	Idaho
DB	Terrance Washington	Utah State
DB	Michael Woods	Middle Tennessee
Second-team Special Teams
K	Brian Kelly	Middle Tennessee
P	Brad Kadlubar	North Texas
RS	David Fiefia	Utah State
All-purpose	Ronshay Jenkins	New Mexico State
