= 2003 Utah State Aggies football team =

American college football season

2003 Utah State Aggies football
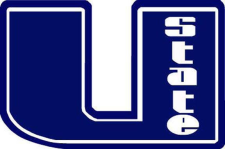
- Conference: Sun Belt Conference
- Record: 3–9 (3–4 Sun Belt)
- Head coach: Mick Dennehy (4th season)
- Offensive coordinator: Bob Cole (4th season)
- Defensive coordinator: David Kotulski (1st season)
- Home stadium: Romney Stadium

2003 Sun Belt Conference football standings
	Conf.			Overall
Team	W		L	W		L
North Texas $	7	–	0	9	–	4
Louisiana–Lafayette	3	–	2	4	–	8
Arkansas State	3	–	3	5	–	7
Middle Tennessee	3	–	3	4	–	8
Utah State	3	–	3	3	–	9
Idaho	3	–	4	3	–	9
New Mexico State	2	–	5	3	–	9
Louisiana–Monroe	1	–	5	1	–	11
$ – Conference champion

The 2003 Utah State Aggies football team represented Utah State University as a member of the Sun Belt Conference in 2003 NCAA Division I-A football season. The Aggies were led by fourth-year head coach Mick Dennehy and played their home games in Romney Stadium in Logan, Utah.

== Schedule ==
Date	Opponent	Site	TV	Result	Attendance
August 28	at Utah*	Rice-Eccles Stadium; Salt Lake City, UT (Battle of the Brothers)		L 20–40	39,697
September 6	No. 23 Nebraska*	Memorial Stadium; Lincoln, NE	FSN	L 7–31	77,284
September 13	at No. 16 Arizona State*	Sun Devil Stadium; Tempe, AZ		L 16–26	51,180
September 27	Louisiana–Monroe	Romney Stadium; Logan, UT		W 28–10	19,215
October 4	at New Mexico*	University Stadium; Albuquerque, NM		L 7–34	31,435
October 11	Wyoming*	Romney Stadium; Logan, UT (rivalry)		L 21-48	31,435
October 18	at North Texas	Fouts Field; Denton, TX		L 27–37	17,239
October 25	Arkansas State	Romney Stadium; Logan, UT		W 49–0	12,516
November 1	Middle Tennessee	Romney Stadium; Logan, UT		W 41–20	6,988
November 6	at New Mexico State	Aggie Memorial Stadium; Las Cruces, NM		L 21–26	10,318
November 15	Troy State*	Romney Stadium; Logan, UT		L 14–23	9,291
November 22	at Idaho	Kibbie Dome; Moscow, ID		L 13–20	9,846
*Non-conference game; Rankings from Coaches' Poll released prior to the game
