= 2004 Idaho Vandals football team =

American college football season

2004 Idaho Vandals football
- Conference: Sun Belt Conference
- Record: 3–9 (2–5 SBC)
- Head coach: Nick Holt (1st season)
- Co-offensive coordinators: Nate Kaczor (1st season); Joel Thomas (1st season)
- Offensive scheme: Multiple
- Base defense: 3–4
- Home stadium: Kibbie Dome

2004 Sun Belt Conference football standings
| | Conf. | | | Overall |
| Team | W | | L | W | | L |
|---|---|---|---|---|---|---|
| North Texas $ | 7 | – | 0 | 7 | – | 5 |
| Troy State | 4 | – | 2 | 7 | – | 5 |
| New Mexico State | 3 | – | 2 | 5 | – | 6 |
| Middle Tennessee | 4 | – | 4 | 5 | – | 6 |
| Louisiana–Monroe | 3 | – | 3 | 5 | – | 6 |
| Arkansas State | 3 | – | 4 | 3 | – | 8 |
| Louisiana–Lafayette | 2 | – | 5 | 4 | – | 7 |
| Utah State | 2 | – | 5 | 3 | – | 8 |
| Idaho | 2 | – | 5 | 3 | – | 9 |
$ – Conference champion

The 2004 Idaho Vandals football team represented the University of Idaho during the 2004 NCAA Division I-A football season. Idaho competed as a member of the Sun Belt Conference, and played their home games in the Kibbie Dome, an indoor facility on campus in Moscow, Idaho. Led by first-year head coach Nick Holt, the Vandals finished at 3–9 (2–5 in Sun Belt, last).

Holt was previously the linebackers coach at USC and an Idaho assistant coach for eight seasons in the 1990s.

== Schedule ==
| Date | Time | Opponent | Site | TV | Result | Attendance | Source |
|---|---|---|---|---|---|---|---|
| September 4 | 5:05 pm | at Boise State* | Bronco Stadium; Boise, ID (rivalry) | | L 7–65 | 30,944 | |
| September 11 | 5:00 pm | at Utah State | Romney Stadium; Logan, UT | | L 7–14 | 20,117 | |
| September 18 | 7:30 pm | Washington State* | Martin Stadium; Pullman, WA (Battle of the Palouse) | FSNNW | L 8–49 | 34,858 | |
| September 25 | 12:30 pm | at Oregon* | Autzen Stadium; Eugene, OR | | L 10–48 | 57,912 | |
| October 2 | 11:00 am | at Eastern Michigan* | Rynearson Stadium; Ypsilanti, MI | | W 45–41 | 18,920 | |
| October 9 | 2:00 pm | Louisiana–Monroe | Kibbie Dome; Moscow, ID | | L 14–16 | 11,798 | |
| October 16 | 2:00 pm | Louisiana–Lafayette | Kibbie Dome; Moscow, ID | | W 38–25 | 10,397 | |
| October 23 | 12:00 pm | at Middle Tennessee | Johnny "Red" Floyd Stadium; Murfreesboro, TN | | L 14–34 | 16,918 | |
| October 30 | 1:30 pm | at Troy | Movie Gallery Stadium; Troy, AL | | L 7–47 | 20,151 | |
| November 6 | 2:00 pm | Arkansas State^{†} | Martin Stadium; Pullman, WA | | W 45–31 | 9,425 | |
| November 13 | 4:00 pm | at North Texas | Fouts Field; Denton, TX | | L 29–51 | 14,583 | |
| November 20 | 8:00 pm | at Hawaii* | Aloha Stadium; Halawa, HI | | L 21–52 | 30,864 | |
*Non-conference game; ^{†}Homecoming; All times are in Pacific time

== Fallen teammate ==
The season was marred by the September death of starting cornerback Eric McMillan, a redshirt freshman from Murrieta, California, and originally from Tuskegee, Alabama. In a case of mistaken identity, he was shot in his apartment in south Moscow on Sunday afternoon, a day after the third game of season, and died at Gritman Medical Center.
