= 2003 Louisiana–Monroe Indians football team =

American college football season

2003 Louisiana–Monroe Indians football
- Conference: Sun Belt Conference
- Record: 1–11 (1–5 Sun Belt)
- Head coach: Charlie Weatherbie (1st season)
- Offensive coordinator: Tommy Condell (2nd season)
- Defensive coordinator: Bob Trott (1st season)
- Home stadium: Malone Stadium

2003 Sun Belt Conference football standings
	Conf.			Overall
Team	W		L	W		L
North Texas $	7	–	0	9	–	4
Louisiana–Lafayette	3	–	2	4	–	8
Arkansas State	3	–	3	5	–	7
Middle Tennessee	3	–	3	4	–	8
Utah State	3	–	3	3	–	9
Idaho	3	–	4	3	–	9
New Mexico State	2	–	5	3	–	9
Louisiana–Monroe	1	–	5	1	–	11
$ – Conference champion

The 2003 Louisiana–Monroe Indians football team represented the University of Louisiana at Monroe in the 2003 NCAA Division I-A college football season. The Indians offense scored 239 points while the defense allowed 467 points.

== Schedule ==
Date	Time	Opponent	Site	TV	Result	Attendance
August 30	7:00 pm	at No. 15 LSU*	Tiger Stadium; Baton Rouge, LA		L 7–49	89,148
September 6	7:00 pm	Stephen F. Austin*	Malone Stadium; Monroe, LA		L 21–23	15,056
September 13	6:00 pm	at Mississippi*	Vaught–Hemingway Stadium; Oxford, MS		L 14–59	50,654
September 20	7:00 pm	Northwestern State*	Malone Stadium; Monroe, LA		L 10–14	16,035
September 27	7:00 pm	at Utah State	Romney Stadium; Logan, UT		L 10–28	19,215
October 4	6:00 pm	at Arkansas State	War Memorial Stadium; Little Rock, AR		L 41–44	20,135
October 11	4:00 pm	at Louisiana–Lafayette	Cajun Field; Lafayette, LA (Battle on the Bayou)		W 45–42	13,540
October 25	7:00 pm	New Mexico State	Malone Stadium; Monroe, LA		L 14–21	7,108
November 1	1:30 pm	at Auburn*	Jordan–Hare Stadium; Auburn, AL		L 7–73	81,061
November 8	4:00 pm	North Texas^{†}	Malone Stadium; Monroe, LA		L 26–28	10,121
November 15	6:05 pm	Idaho	Malone Stadium; Monroe, LA	ESPN+	L 20–58	8,172
November 22	11:30 am	at Troy State*	Veterans Memorial Stadium; Troy, AL		L 24–28	19,057
*Non-conference game; ^{†}Homecoming; Rankings from AP Poll released prior to the game; All times are in Central time

== Roster ==
2003 Louisiana–Monroe Indians football team roster
Players
Coaches
Offense

Pos.	#	Name	Class
QB	10	Daniel Da Prato	Sr

Defense

Pos.	#	Name	Class
FS	5	Chris Harris	Jr
DE	89	Marbrae Wilson	Jr

Special teams

Pos.	#	Name	Class

Head coach

- Charlie Weatherbie

Coordinators/assistant coaches

Legend

- (C) Team captain
- (S) Suspended
- (I) Ineligible
- Injured
- Redshirt

Roster
Last update: 2004-02-13
