= 2004 Louisiana–Lafayette Ragin' Cajuns football team =

American college football season

2004 Louisiana–Lafayette Ragin' Cajuns football
- Conference: Sun Belt Conference
- Record: 4–7 (2–5 Sun Belt)
- Head coach: Rickey Bustle (3rd season)
- Offensive coordinator: Rob Christophel (3rd season)
- Defensive coordinator: Brent Pry (3rd season)
- Home stadium: Cajun Field

2004 Sun Belt Conference football standings
	Conf.			Overall
Team	W		L	W		L
North Texas $	7	–	0	7	–	5
Troy State	4	–	2	7	–	5
New Mexico State	3	–	2	5	–	6
Middle Tennessee	4	–	4	5	–	6
Louisiana–Monroe	3	–	3	5	–	6
Arkansas State	3	–	4	3	–	8
Louisiana–Lafayette	2	–	5	4	–	7
Utah State	2	–	5	3	–	8
Idaho	2	–	5	3	–	9
$ – Conference champion

The 2004 Louisiana–Lafayette Ragin' Cajuns football team represented the University of Louisiana at Lafayette as a member of the Sun Belt Conference in the 2004 NCAA Division I-A football season. They were led by third-year head coach Rickey Bustle and played their home games at Cajun Field in Lafayette, Louisiana.

== Schedule ==
Date	Time	Opponent	Site	Result	Attendance
September 4	7:00 p.m.	Northwestern State*	Cajun Field; Lafayette, LA	W 14–7	22,117
September 11	6:00 p.m.	at Louisiana Tech*	Joe Aillet Stadium; Ruston, LA	L 24–20	22,467
September 18	1:10 p.m.	at Kansas State*	KSU Stadium; Manhattan, KS	L 40–20	46,514
September 25	6:00 p.m.	Middle Tennessee	Cajun Field; Lafayette, LA	W 24–17	25,083
October 2	5:05 p.m.	at FIU*	FIU Stadium; Miami, FL	W 34–43	10,022
October 9	6:05 p.m.	at New Mexico State	Aggie Memorial Stadium; Las Cruces, NM	L 32–35	9,748
October 16	2:00 p.m.	at Idaho	Kibbie Dome; Moscow, ID	L 25–38	10,397
October 23	4:00 p.m.	Arkansas State	Cajun Field; Lafayette, LA	W 24–27	23,121
November 5	9:20 p.m.	North Texas	Cajun Field; Lafayette, LA	L 17–27	21,608
November 13	2:30 p.m.	Troy	Cajun Field; Lafayette, LA	L 10–13	15,077
November 20	6:30 p.m.	at Louisiana–Monroe	Malone Stadium; Monroe, LA (Battle on the Bayou)	L 10–13	9,356
*Non-conference game; All times are in Central time

== Game summaries ==
=== Northwestern State ===
Northwestern State at Louisiana-Lafayette – Game summary

Quarter	1	2	3	4	Total
Demons	0	7	0	0	7
Ragin' Cajuns	7	7	0	0	14

at Cajun Field, Lafayette, LA

- Date: September 4
- Game time: 7:00 p.m. CST
- Game weather: 82 °F (28 °C); partly cloudy
- Game attendance: 22,117
- Referee: Ross Smith

Game information

First quarter

- ULL - Jerry Babb 2-yard TD run, Sean Comiskey kick good, 5:24 (ULL 7-0)

Second quarter

- ULL - Travis Smothers 7-yard TD pass from Babb, Comiskey kick good, 13:08 (ULL 14-0)
- NSU - Derrick Doyle 17-yard TD pass from Davon Vinson, Tommy Hebert kick good, 0:50 (ULL 14-7)

Top passers

- ULL - Jerry Babb - 17/26, 176 yards, TD, INT
- NSU - Davon Vinson - 12/27, 148 yards, TD, INT

Top rushers

- ULL - Chester Johnson - 14 carries, 63 yards
- NSU - Shelton Sampson - 8 carries, 30 yards

Top receivers

- ULL - Bill Sampy - 3 receptions, 43 yards
- NSU - Toby Zeigler - 4 receptions, 82 yards

=== At Louisiana Tech ===
Louisiana-Lafayette at Louisiana Tech – Game summary

Quarter	1	2	3	4	Total
Ragin' Cajuns	0	7	13	0	20
Bulldogs	0	17	0	7	24

at Joe Aillet Stadium, Ruston, LA

- Date: September 11
- Game time: 6:00 p.m. CST
- Game weather: 86 °F (30 °C); mostly sunny
- Game attendance: 22,467
- Referee: Jeff Roberson

Game information

Second quarter

- LT - Brad Oestriecher 30-yard field goal, 9:30 (LT 3-0)
- LT - Erick Franklin 19-yard TD pass from Donald Allen, Oestriecher kick good, 6:44 (LT 10-0)
- LT - Ryan Moats 13-yard TD run, Oestriecher kick good, 3:03 (LT 17-0)
- ULL - Jerry Babb 1-yard TD run, Sean Comiskey kick good, 0:39 (LT 17-7)

Third quarter

- ULL - Comiskey 41-yard field goal, 11:02 (LT 17-10)
- ULL - Bill Sampy 59-yard TD pass from Babb, Comiskey kick good, 7:07 (TIE 17-17)
- ULL - Comiskey 33-yard field goal, 1:21 (ULL 20-17)

Fourth quarter

- LT - Allen 3-yard TD run, Oestriecher kick good, 10:49 (LT 24-20)

Top passers

- LT - Donald Allen - 17/28, 183 yards, TD, INT
- ULL - Jerry Babb - 31/53, 327 yards, TD, 2 INT

Top rushers

- LT - Ryan Moats - 34 carries, 257 yards, TD
- ULL - Chester Johnson - 7 carries, 33 yards

Top receivers

- LT - Julius Crosby - 5 receptions, 53 yards
- ULL - Bill Sampy - 8 receptions, 107 yards, TD

=== At Kansas State ===
Louisiana-Lafayette at Kansas State – Game summary

Quarter	1	2	3	4	Total
Ragin' Cajuns	0	7	7	6	20
Wildcats	13	7	10	10	40

at KSU Stadium, Manhattan, KS

- Date: September 18
- Game time: 1:10 p.m. CST
- Game weather: 83 °F (28 °C); mostly sunny
- Game attendance: 47,914
- Referee: John Laurie

Game information

First quarter

- KSU - Joe Rheem 41-yard field goal, 11:10 (KSU 3-0)
- KSU - Darren Sproles 35-yard field goal, Rheem kick good, 8:30 (KSU 10-0)
- KSU - Rheem 34-yard field goal, 1:20 (KSU 13-0)

Second quarter

- ULL - Jerry Babb 39-yard TD pass to B.J. Crist, Sean Comiskey kick good, 12:30 (KSU 13-7)
- KSU - Dylan Meier 7-yard TD pass to Brian Casey, Rheem kick good, 6:02 (KSU 20-7)

Third quarter

- KSU - Meier 1-yard TD rush, Rheem kick good, 10:10 (KSU 27-7)
- KSU - Rheem 33-yard field goal, 07:30 (KSU 30-7)
- ULL - Babb 9-yard TD rush, Comiskey kick good, 04:08 (KSU 30-14)

Fourth quarter

- ULL - Chester Johnson 1-yard TD rush, Comiskey kick no good, 10:15 (KSU 30-20)
- KSU - Meier 5-yard TD rush, Rheem kick good, 06:45 (KSU 37-20)
- KSU - Rheem 33-yard field goal, 2:00 (KSU 40-20)

Top passers

- ULL - Jerry Babb - 9/23, 128 yards, TD, 2 INT
- KSU - Dylan Meier - 7/10, 52 yards, TD

Top rushers

- ULL - Jerry Babb - 4 carries, 101 yards, TD
- KSU - Darren Sproles - 38 carries, 292 yards, TD

Top receivers

- ULL - Bill Sampy - 2 receptions, 58 yards
- KSU - Davin Dennis - 2 receptions, 19 yards

=== Middle Tennessee ===
Middle Tennessee at Louisiana-Lafayette – Game summary

Quarter	1	2	3	4	Total
Blue Raiders	7	7	0	3	17
Ragin' Cajuns	7	7	7	2	23

at Cajun Field, Lafayette, LA

- Date: September 25
- Game time: 6:00 p.m. CST
- Game weather: 84 °F (29 °C); partly cloudy
- Game attendance: 25,083
- Referee: Rick Doan

Game information

First quarter

- ULL - Dwight Lindon 5-yard TD rush, Sean Comiskey kick good, 12:51 (ULL 7-0)
- MTSU - Pierre Ingram 15-yard TD pass from Clint Marks, Colby Smith kick good, 5:59 (TIE 7-7)

Second quarter

- MTSU - Eugene Gross 1-yard TD rush, Smith kick good, 2:49 (MTSU 14-7)
- ULL - B.J. Crist 10-yard TD pass from Jerry Babb, Comiskey kick good, 0:25 (TIE 14-14)

Third quarter

- ULL - Xavier Campbell 7-yard TD pass from Babb, Comiskey kick good, 7:30 (ULL 21-14)

Fourth quarter

- ULL - Comiskey 38-yard field goal, 14:51 (ULL 24-14)
- MTSU - Smith 37-yard field goal, 10:55 (ULL 24-17)

Top passers

- MTSU - Clint Marks - 35/46, 242 yards, TD, INT
- ULL - Jerry Babb - 16/26, 183 yards, 2 TD

Top rushers

- MTSU - Eugene Gross - 16 carries, 66 yards, TD
- ULL - Jerry Babb - 10 carries, 68 yards

Top receivers

- MTSU - Kerry Wright - 8 receptions, 76 yards
- ULL - Bill Sampy - 6 receptions, 79 yards

=== Florida International ===
	1	2	3	4	Total
Ragin' Cajuns	7	17	3	16	43
Golden Panthers	3	14	7	10	34

=== New Mexico State ===
	1	2	3	4	Total
Ragin' Cajuns	7	14	0	11	32
Aggies	7	6	22	0	35

=== Idaho ===
	1	2	3	4	Total
Ragin' Cajuns	0	10	3	12	25
Vandals	14	7	0	17	38

=== Arkansas State ===
	1	2	3	4	Total
Indians	0	7	10	7	24
Ragin' Cajuns	7	17	3	0	27

=== North Texas ===
	1	2	3	4	Total
Mean Green	17	0	3	7	27
Ragin' Cajuns	3	7	0	7	17

=== Troy ===
	1	2	3	4	Total
Trojans	3	7	3	0	13
Ragin' Cajuns	0	0	7	3	10

=== Louisiana-Monroe ===
	1	2	3	4	Total
Ragin' Cajuns	0	7	0	3	10
Indians	7	3	0	3	13
