= Gerry Gdowski =

American football player and coach (born 1967)

Personal information
- Born: August 9, 1967 (age 59); Fremont, Nebraska, U.S.
- Listed height: 6 ft 1 in (1.85 m)
- Listed weight: 185 lb (84 kg)

Career information
- High school: Fremont (NE)
- College: Nebraska
- NFL draft: 1990: 8th round, 207th overall pick

Career history

Playing
- New Orleans Saints (1990)*
- * Offseason or practice squad member only

Coaching
- Nebraska (1991–1993) Graduate assistant; South Dakota State (1994–1995) Quarterbacks and wide receivers coach; South Dakota State (1996–1997) Offensive coordinator; New Mexico State (1998–2002) Quarterbacks coach; New Mexico State (2003–2004) Assistant head coach and offensive coordinator; Ohio (2005–2007) Quarterbacks Coach; Ohio (2010–2013) Assistant head coach, co-offensive coordinator, quarterbacks coach; Vanderbilt (2014–2015) Tight ends coach; Vanderbilt (2016–2018) Quarterbacks coach; Vanderbilt (2019) Offensive coordinator and Quarterbacks coach

Awards and highlights
- As player: Big-Eight Co-Offensive Player of the Year (1989); First-team All-Big-Eight (1989); Nebraska Football Hall of Fame Inductee (2000)

Gerry Gdowski (born August 9, 1967) is an American former college football quarterback for the University of Nebraska–Lincoln, and later a college football coach.

A relative unknown from a national perspective coming into the 1989 season, Gdowski put together a seasons that earned him numerous accolades. His performance running the Cornhusker offense led to multiple awards, including being named the Big Eight football conference Co-Offensive Player of the Year. Gdowski broke or tied 11 school records at Nebraska. His NCAA passer rating was 177.3 points, a school record, and was better than the Jim McMahon’s 1980 NCAA record of 176.9 at that time, except that Gdowski averaged 12.4 attempts per game and the NCAA minimum was 15.

== Early life ==
Gdowski was born in Kearney, Nebraska on August 6, 1967. He later attended high school at Fremont Senior High in Fremont, Nebraska, and was selected as the 1985 Nebraska high school athlete of the year. He earned an all-state selection for football twice, and also in basketball his senior year. He also won 8 gold medals in 3 state track meets. He was also an honors student, earning the valedictorian of his senior class.

== College career ==
Following high school, Gdowski accepted an in-state scholarship offer to play quarterback at the University of Nebraska–Lincoln. In the fall of 1986, he led the Husker freshman team in rushing, passing, and total offense. As a sophomore backup in 1987, he was third on the quarterback depth chart. Playing in 6 games, he threw for 8 yards on a single completion on two attempts, and rushed for 131 yards on 18 attempts with 2 touchdowns. Backing up starter Steve Taylor during his junior season, Gdowski played in 7 games, passing for 64 yards on 8 attempts, and rushing for 155 yards on 17 attempts with 2 touchdowns.

Earning the starting job as a senior in 1989, Gdowski was selected as a team co-captain. He threw for 19 touchdowns, including 10 in the last 3 games, and 2 interceptions for a school record interception percentage of 1.47. He also rushed for a then school record 925 yards, breaking the quarterback rushing record that was set the previous season by Steve Taylor, and tied Taylor’s 1988 QB record for touchdowns at 13. For the season, he averaged 7.91 yards per attempt, breaking the 1983 school record of Heisman trophy winning running back Mike Rozier. Gdowski came close to being the first Nebraska quarterback to pass for 1000 yards and rush for 1000 yards in a single season, a feat that would be first achieved at Nebraska by Scott Frost in 1997. He led Nebraska to a 10-2 record and a second straight Big Eight title, resulting in a Fiesta Bowl appearance. Legendary Nebraska coach Tom Osborne referred to Gdowski as having played "as well as any quarterback I’ve ever had here". Osborne went further to say "He had speed, excellent runner, smart guy". In 1989, Gdowski was a CoSIDA Academic All-American, National Football Scholar Athlete, and Academic All Big Eight in 1988 and 1989.

=== Statistics ===
	Passing						Rushing			
SEASON	CMP	ATT	CMP%	YDS	TD	INT	ATT	YDS	AVG	TD
1987	1	2	50	8	0	0	18	131	7.3	2
1988	5	8	62.5	64	0	0	17	158	9.1	2
1989	71	136	52.7	1,326	19	2	117	925	7.9	13
Totals	77	146	52.7	1,398	19	2	152	1,211	8.0	17

In the classroom, Gdowski also excelled at Nebraska, earning multiple scholar athlete awards.

== NFL draft ==
Drafted in the eighth round by the New Orleans Saints, Gdowski did not make the final team roster and was cut.

== Coaching career ==
After graduating from Nebraska, Gdowski worked with the quarterbacks, tight ends, and wide receivers in a graduate assistant capacity at Nebraska from 1991 to 1993. He then moved to South Dakota State University, where he served as the quarterbacks and wide receivers coach for two seasons. In his third season with the program, Gdowski was promoted to offensive coordinator. The following season, he moved to New Mexico State, where he served as the quarterbacks coach and recruiting coordinator from 1998 to 2002. Gdowski served as their assistant head coach and offensive coordinator for 2003 and 2004. The following year, he left for Ohio University, where he was the quarterbacks coach from 2005 to 2007. Three years later, he became Ohio's assistant head coach, co-offensive coordinator, and quarterbacks coach. In 2014, Gdowski left to join the first staff of Derek Mason (who was on the Ohio coaching staff with Gdowski in 2005 and 2006) at Vanderbilt University. He served as the recruiting coordinator and tight ends coach for 2014 and 2015. He was promoted to quarterbacks coach in 2016 and then offensive coordinator at the start of the season in 2019. In December 2019, Gdowski and Vanderbilt defensive coordinator Jason Tarver were both let go by the university.

== Personal life ==
Gdowski was born in Kearney, Nebraska and his parents are Gerry Gdowski Sr. and Carol Gdowski. The family moved to Fremont, Nebraska in 1979.

Gdowski and his wife, Sam, have three sons - Isaac, Tommy, and Luke. He is the cousin of Tom Gdowski, who played defensive tackle for Nebraska in the early 1980's.
