= 2004 North Texas Mean Green football team =

American college football season

2004 North Texas Mean Green football

Sun Belt champion

New Orleans Bowl, L 10–31 vs. Southern Miss
- Conference: Sun Belt Conference
- Record: 7–5 (7–0 Sun Belt)
- Head coach: Darrell Dickey (7th season)
- Offensive coordinator: Ramon Flanigan (3rd season)
- Offensive scheme: Pro spread
- Defensive coordinator: Kenny Evans (2nd season)
- Base defense: 4–2–5
- Home stadium: Fouts Field

2004 Sun Belt Conference football standings
	Conf.			Overall
Team	W		L	W		L
North Texas $	7	–	0	7	–	5
Troy State	4	–	2	7	–	5
New Mexico State	3	–	2	5	–	6
Middle Tennessee	4	–	4	5	–	6
Louisiana–Monroe	3	–	3	5	–	6
Arkansas State	3	–	4	3	–	8
Louisiana–Lafayette	2	–	5	4	–	7
Utah State	2	–	5	3	–	8
Idaho	2	–	5	3	–	9
$ – Conference champion

The 2004 North Texas Mean Green football team represented the University of North Texas as a member of the Sun Belt Conference during the 2004 NCAA Division I-A football season. Led by seventh-year head coach Darrell Dickey, the Mean Green compiled an overall record of 7–5 with a mark 7–0 in conference play, winning the Sun Belt title. North Texas was invited to the New Orleans Bowl, where the Mean Green lost to Southern Miss. The team played home games at the Fouts Field in Denton, Texas.

== Schedule ==
Date	Time	Opponent	Site	TV	Result	Attendance	Source
September 4	6:00 p.m.	at No. 7 Texas*	Darrell K Royal–Texas Memorial Stadium; Austin, TX	PPV	L 0–65	82,956	
September 11	6:00 p.m.	Florida Atlantic*	Fouts Field; Denton, TX		L 13–20	15,803	
September 18	6:00 p.m.	at Colorado*	Folsom Field; Boulder, CO	PPV	L 21–52	46,355	
September 25	6:00 p.m.	at Baylor*	Floyd Casey Stadium; Waco, TX		L 14–37	33,619	
October 2	6:05 p.m.	Middle Tennessee	Fouts Field; Denton, TX		W 30–21	15,913	
October 9	7:05 p.m.	at Utah State	Romney Stadium; Logan, UT		W 31–23	17,895	
October 23	6:05 p.m.	New Mexico State^{†}	Fouts Field; Denton, TX	ESPN Plus	W 36–26	18,729	
October 30	6:05 p.m.	Louisiana–Monroe	Fouts Field; Denton, TX	ESPN Plus	W 45–30	10,893	
November 5	9:20 p.m.	at Louisiana–Lafayette	Cajun Field; Lafayette, LA		W 27–17	21,608	
November 13	6:00 p.m.	Idaho	Fouts Field; Denton, TX		W 51–29	14,583	
November 18	6:00 p.m.	at Arkansas State	Indian Stadium; Jonesboro, AR	ESPN Plus	W 31–7	6,883	
December 14	6:30 p.m.	vs. Southern Miss*	Louisiana Superdome; New Orleans, LA (New Orleans Bowl)	ESPN	L 10–31	27,253	
*Non-conference game; ^{†}Homecoming; Rankings from AP Poll released prior to the game; All times are in Central time
