= 2003 North Texas Mean Green football team =

American college football season

2003 North Texas Mean Green football

Sun Belt champion

New Orleans Bowl, L 17–27 vs. Memphis
- Conference: Sun Belt Conference
- Record: 9–4 (7–0 Sun Belt)
- Head coach: Darrell Dickey (6th season)
- Offensive coordinator: Ramon Flanigan (2nd season)
- Offensive scheme: Pro spread
- Defensive coordinator: Kenny Evans (1st season)
- Base defense: 4–2–5
- Home stadium: Fouts Field

2003 Sun Belt Conference football standings
	Conf.			Overall
Team	W		L	W		L
North Texas $	7	–	0	9	–	4
Louisiana–Lafayette	3	–	2	4	–	8
Arkansas State	3	–	3	5	–	7
Middle Tennessee	3	–	3	4	–	8
Utah State	3	–	3	3	–	9
Idaho	3	–	4	3	–	9
New Mexico State	2	–	5	3	–	9
Louisiana–Monroe	1	–	5	1	–	11
$ – Conference champion

The 2003 North Texas Mean Green football team represented the University of North Texas as a member of the Sun Belt Conference during the 2003 NCAA Division I-A football season. Led by sixth-year head coach Darrell Dickey, the Mean Green compiled an overall record of 9–4 with a mark 7–0 in conference play, winning the Sun Belt title. North Texas was invited to the New Orleans Bowl, where the Mean Green lost to Memphis. The team played home games at the Fouts Field in Denton, Texas.

== Schedule ==
Date	Time	Opponent	Site	TV	Result	Attendance	Source
August 30	6:00 pm	at No. 1 Oklahoma*	Gaylord Family Oklahoma Memorial Stadium; Norman, OK		L 3–37	83,073	
September 6	7:00 pm	Baylor*	Fouts Field; Denton, TX	FSN	W 52–14	29,437	
September 13	1:00 pm	at Air Force*	Falcon Stadium; Colorado Springs, CO		L 21–34	32,541	
September 20	6:00 pm	at No. 14 Arkansas*	War Memorial Stadium; Little Rock, AR		L 7–31	55,825	
September 27	7:00 pm	Louisiana–Lafayette	Fouts Field; Denton, TX		W 44–23	19,271	
October 11	6:00 pm	at Idaho	Kibbie Dome; Moscow, ID	ESPN	W 24–14	12,845	
October 18	3:00 pm	Utah State^{†}	Fouts Field; Denton, TX		W 37–27	17,239	
October 25	6:00 pm	at Middle Tennessee	Johnny "Red" Floyd Stadium; Murfreesboro, TN	ESPN	W 33–28	9,049	
October 30	6:00 pm	Troy*	Fouts Field; Denton, TX	ESPN	W 21–0	11,128	
November 8	4:00 pm	at Louisiana–Monroe	Malone Stadium; Monroe, LA		W 28–26	10,121	
November 15	3:00 pm	Arkansas State	Fouts Field; Denton, TX		W 58–14	16,394	
November 25	6:00 pm	at New Mexico State	Aggie Memorial Stadium; Las Cruces, NM	ESPN2	W 13–10	12,472	
December 16	7:00 pm	vs. Memphis*	Louisiana Superdome; New Orleans, LA (New Orleans Bowl)	ESPN2	L 17–27	25,184	
*Non-conference game; ^{†}Homecoming; Rankings from AP Poll released prior to the game; All times are in Central time
