= Sun Belt Conference football =

American college football conference

The Sun Belt Conference (SBC) is a conference of 14 universities which participate in the NCAA's Division I Football Bowl Subdivision (FBS). As of the 2022 season, all 14 current full members sponsor football in the conference. Although the SBC was formed in 1976, it did not sponsor football until 2001.

The conference announced that beginning in 2018, the conference (10 teams after the departure of Idaho and New Mexico State) would split into two divisions for football. In the East: Appalachian State, Coastal Carolina, Georgia Southern, Georgia State, and Troy; In the West: Arkansas State, Louisiana, Louisiana–Monroe, South Alabama, and Texas State. The winners of each division meet in the Sun Belt Championship Game.

Beginning in 2022, the SBC added the Marshall Thundering Herd, James Madison Dukes, Old Dominion Monarchs, and Southern Miss Golden Eagles football programs to the conference, with the Alabama–Georgia border serving as the new dividing line for the divisions. Accordingly, the Troy Trojans moved from the East Division to the West Division, where Southern Miss joined them. Marshall, JMU, and ODU joined the East division at that time.

Texas State left the SBC for the Pac-12 Conference in 2026 and was replaced in the West Division by the Louisiana Tech Bulldogs.

== Membership ==
=== Current ===
Institution	Team Name	Location (Population)	Team Started	Affiliation	Enrollment	Mascot	SBC Titles	National Titles
East Division
Appalachian State University	Mountaineers	Boone, North Carolina (18,834)	1899	Public	20,641	Yosef	4	3 (FCS)
Coastal Carolina University	Chanticleers	Conway, South Carolina (16,317)	2003	Public	10,479	Chauncey	1	0
Georgia Southern University	Eagles	Statesboro, Georgia (31,419)	1982	Public	20,584	Freedom (live); GUS (costume)	1	6 (FCS)
Georgia State University	Panthers	Atlanta, Georgia (443,775)	2010	Public	52,814	Pounce	0	0
James Madison University	Dukes	Harrisonburg, Virginia (51,814)	1972	Public	21,496	Duke Dog	1	2 (FCS)
Marshall University	Thundering Herd	Huntington, West Virginia (46,482)	1895	Public	11,926	Marco the Bison	1	2 (FCS)
Old Dominion University	Monarchs	Norfolk, Virginia (238,005)	2009 (Note: The team played as a division of the College of William & Mary from 1930 to 1940, then folded. It was restarted in 2009; 17 years ago.)	Public	24,286	Big Blue	0	0
West Division
Arkansas State University	Red Wolves	Jonesboro, Arkansas (74,889)	1909	Public	14,074	Howl	6	1 (Div II)
University of Louisiana at Lafayette	Ragin' Cajuns	Lafayette, Louisiana (120,623)	1898	Public	19,291	Cayenne	4	0
University of Louisiana at Monroe	Warhawks	Monroe, Louisiana (49,147)	1931	Public	8,623	Ace the Warhawk	1	1 (FCS)
Louisiana Tech University	Bulldogs	Ruston, Louisiana (22,166)	1901	Public	12,039	Tech (live); Champ (costume)	0	3 (Div II)
University of South Alabama	Jaguars	Mobile, Alabama (195,111)	2009	Public	16,055	South Paw	0	0
University of Southern Mississippi	Golden Eagles	Hattiesburg, Mississippi (48,730)	1912	Public	14,606	Seymour d'Campus	0	2 (Div II)
Troy University	Trojans	Troy, Alabama (19,191)	1887	Public	29,689	T-Roy	8	2 (Div II)

=== Former ===
Institution	Team Name	Location (Population)	Team Started	Affiliation	Enrollment	Mascot	Sun Belt Titles	National Titles	Joined Sun Belt	Left Sun Belt	Current Conference
Florida Atlantic University	Owls	Boca Raton, Florida (87,836)	1961	Public	31,758	Owlsley the Owl	1	0	2005	2013	American
Florida International University	Panthers	Miami, Florida (413,892) (Note: The main FIU campus has a Miami mailing address but is located in the unincorporated Miami-Dade County community of Westchester.)	1965	Public	50,394	Roary the Panther	1	0	2001	2013	CUSA
University of Idaho	Vandals	Moscow, Idaho (23,800)	1889	Public	11,534	Joe Vandal	0	0	2001; 2014	2005; 2018	Big Sky (FCS)
Middle Tennessee State University	Blue Raiders	Murfreesboro, Tennessee (114,038)	1911	Public	24,192	Lighting	2	0	2001	2013	CUSA
New Mexico State University	Aggies	Las Cruces, New Mexico (97,618)	1888	Public	24,580	Pistol Pete	0	0	2001; 2014	2005; 2018	CUSA
University of North Texas	Mean Green	Denton, Texas (113,383)	1890	Public	35,778	Scrappy the Eagle	4	0	2001	2013	American
Texas State University	Bobcats	San Marcos, Texas (44,894)	1899	Public	34,229	Boko the Bobcat	0	2 (Div II)	2013	2026	Pac-12
Utah State University	Aggies	Logan, Utah (49,534)	1888	Public	28,796	Big Blue	0	0	2003	2005	Pac-12
Western Kentucky University	Hilltoppers	Bowling Green, Kentucky (58,067)	1906	Public	18,391	Big Red	0	1 (FCS)	2009	2014	CUSA

== Reorganization ==
=== Membership timeline ===
Full football members Full non-football members Associate football members Independent Other Conference Other Conference

== Conference facilities ==
School	Football Stadium	Capacity	Opened
Appalachian State	Kidd Brewer Stadium	30,000	1962
Arkansas State	Centennial Bank Stadium	30,406	1974
Coastal Carolina	Brooks Stadium	21,000	2003
Georgia Southern	Paulson Stadium	25,000	1984
Georgia State	Center Parc Stadium	24,333	1996 (Note: The stadium was reconstructed as a football-specific stadium and re-opened in 2017. It originally opened as Centennial Olympic Stadium in 1996, 30 years ago, and became Turner Field in 1997.)
James Madison	Bridgeforth Stadium	24,677	1975
Louisiana	Cajun Field	41,426	1971
Louisiana–Monroe	Malone Stadium	27,617	1978
Marshall	Joan C. Edwards Stadium	38,227	1991
Old Dominion	S.B. Ballard Stadium	21,944	1936
South Alabama	Hancock Whitney Stadium	25,450	2020
Southern Miss	M. M. Roberts Stadium	36,000	1932
Texas State	Bobcat Stadium	30,008	1981
Troy	Veterans Memorial Stadium	30,402	1950

== Records ==
=== School records ===
Team	First Season	All-Time Record	All-Time Win %	FBS Bowl Appearances	FBS Bowl Record	All-Time Conference Titles (Note: Includes all conference championships, regardless of conference.)	Current Head Coach
Appalachian State	1928	674–369–29	.642	9	7–2	22	Dowell Loggains
Arkansas State	1911	489–513–37	.488	10	4-6	12	Butch Jones
Coastal Carolina	2003	155–80	.660	2	1–1	8	Ryan Beard
Georgia Southern	1924	410–243–10	.626	4	3-1	11	Clay Helton
Georgia State	2010	52–96	.351	5	3–2	0	Dell McGee
James Madison	1972	389–226–4	.632	2	1–1	11	Billy Napier
Louisiana	1902	555–566–34	.495	11	8-3	10	Michael Desormeaux
Louisiana–Monroe	1951	321–450–8	.417	1	0–1	5	Bryant Vincent
Louisiana Tech	1901	654–508–37	.561	15	9–5–1	25	Sonny Cumbie
Marshall	1895	617–561–47	.523	18	12–6	13	Tony Gibson
Old Dominion	2009 (Note: The team played as a division of the College of William & Mary from 1930 to 1940, then folded. It was restarted in 2009; 17 years ago.)	92–79–0	.538	3	1–2	0	Ricky Rahne
South Alabama	2009	70–84	.455	5	2–3	0	Major Applewhite
Southern Miss	1912	609–450–27	.573	23	11–12	8	Will Hall
Troy	1909	558–426–28	.565	8	5–3	21	Jon Sumrall

=== Team vs. team ===
The table consists of composite all-time records against conference opponents. Totals are through the end of the 2024 season.

"Team vs Team Record"
	Appalachian State	Arkansas State	Coastal Carolina	Georgia Southern	Georgia State	James Madison	Louisiana	Louisiana–Monroe	Marshall	Old Dominion	South Alabama	Southern Miss	Texas State	Troy
Appalachian State	---	1–4	4–7	17–21–1	0–11	5–14	4–8	1–7	11–16	1–4	2–4	2–1	1–6	4–8
Arkansas State	4–1	---	3–3	3–3	2–7	1–0	30–21–1	14–31	1–0	2–0	6–7	10–4	5–7	9–11
Coastal Carolina	7–4	3–3	---	7–4	4–4	4–1	2–2	3–2	1–2	2–2	1–2	0–1	1–4	4–3
Georgia Southern	21–17–1	3–3	4–7	---	6–5	2–9	5–1	3–7	6–3	2–3	2–8	1–0	2–5	15–7
Georgia State	11–0	7–2	4–4	5–6	---	4–0	6–1	4–4	2–1	5–1	4–5	0–1	4–5	6–4
James Madison	14–5	0–1	1–4	9–2	0–4	---	0–0	1–0	4–1	2–3	0–1	0–1	0–1	1–2
Louisiana	8–4	21–30–1	2–2	1–5	1–5	0–0	---	26–33	1–2	1–0	4–9	41–12–1	0–11	11–10
Louisiana–Monroe	7–1	31–14	2–3	8–3	4–4	0–1	33–26	---	1–1	0–0	6–5	6–3	6–13	12–9–1
Marshall	16–11	0–1	2–1	3–6	1–2	1–4	2–1	1–1	---	1–9	1–0	8–7	0–0	3–3
Old Dominion	4–1	0–2	2–2	3–2	1–5	3–2	0–1	0–0	9–1	---	1–0	1–2	0–1	0–0
South Alabama	4–2	7–6	2–1	8–2	5–4	1–0	9–4	5–6	0–1	0–1	---	0–5	6–4	9–4
Southern Miss	1–2	4–10	1–0	0–1	1–0	1–0	12–41–1	3–6	7–8	2–1	5–0	---	3–2	6–8
Texas State	6–1	7–5	4–1	5–2	5–4	1–0	11–0	13–8	0–0	1–0	4–6	2–3	---	13–2
Troy	8–4	12–9	3–4	7–15	4–6	2–1	14–11	9–12–1	3–3	0–0	4–9	8–6	2–13	---
Total*	111–54–1	95–90–1	34–39	75–72–1	34–62	25–32	123–117–2	83–118–1	46–39	19–24	42–58	79–46–1	32–72	93–76–1

=== Current head coaching records ===
Records accurate entering the 2025 season.

Team	Head coach	Years at school (Note: Includes the upcoming 2025 season.)	Overall record	Record at school	Sun Belt record
Appalachian State	Dowell Loggains	1	0–0	0–0	0–0
Arkansas State	Butch Jones	5	103–85	19–31	11–21
Coastal Carolina	Tim Beck	3	14–12	14–12	8–8
Georgia Southern	Clay Helton	4	66–43	20–19	12–12
Georgia State	Dell McGee	2	4–9	3–9	1–7
James Madison	Billy Napier	1	62-35	0-0	40-12
Louisiana	Michael Desormeaux	4 (Note: Does not include Desormeaux's serving as head coach in the 2021 New Orleans Bowl after his predecessor Billy Napier left for Florida.)	23–18	23–18	14–10
Louisiana–Monroe	Bryant Vincent	2	12–13	5–7	3–5
Louisiana Tech	Sonny Cumbie	5	21–34	19–31	0–0
Marshall	Tony Gibson	1	0–0	0–0	0–0
Old Dominion	Ricky Rahne	6 (Note: Rahne was hired at Old Dominion before the 2020 season, but the school canceled that season due to COVID-19 concerns. Rahne's first game as head coach was not until 2021.)	20–30	20–30	16–16
South Alabama	Major Applewhite	2	22–17	7–6	5–3
Southern Miss	Charles Huff	1	32–20	0–0	0–0
Troy	Gerad Parker	2	4–14	4–8	3–5

== Conference champions ==
=== Pre-championship game era (2001–2017) ===
Season	Champion	Conference record
2001	Middle Tennessee; North Texas	5–1
2002	North Texas	6–0
2003	North Texas	7–0
2004	North Texas	7–0
2005	Arkansas State; Louisiana–Lafayette; Louisiana–Monroe	5–2
2006	Middle Tennessee; Troy	6–1
2007	Florida Atlantic; Troy	6–1
2008	Troy	6–1
2009	Troy	8–0
2010	FIU; Troy	6–2
2011	Arkansas State	8–0
2012	Arkansas State	7–1
2013	Arkansas State; Louisiana–Lafayette	5–2
2014	Georgia Southern	8–0
2015	Arkansas State	8–0
2016	Appalachian State; Arkansas State	7–1
2017	Appalachian State; Troy	7–1

=== Sun Belt Championship Game (2018–present) ===
Season	East Division	Score	West Division	Site	Date	Attendance
2018	[[2018 Appalachian State Mountaineers football team|Appalachian State]]	30–19	Louisiana	Kidd Brewer Stadium • Boone, North Carolina	December 1, 2018	14,963
2019	[[2019 Appalachian State Mountaineers football team|Appalachian State]]	45–38	Louisiana	Kidd Brewer Stadium • Boone, North Carolina	December 7, 2019	18,618
2020	Coastal Carolina	–	Louisiana	Game canceled during the COVID-19 pandemic. (Note: In 2020, the SBC Football Championship Game was cancelled due to COVID-19 cases in the Coastal Carolina program. As a result, CCU and Louisiana were declared co-champions.)		
2021	Appalachian State	16–24	[[2021 Louisiana Ragin' Cajuns football team|Louisiana]]	Cajun Field • Lafayette, Louisiana	December 4, 2021	31,014
2022	Coastal Carolina	26–45	[[2022 Troy Trojans football team|Troy]]	Veterans Memorial Stadium • Troy, Alabama	December 3, 2022	21,554
2023	Appalachian State	23–49	[[2023 Troy Trojans football team|Troy]]	Veterans Memorial Stadium • Troy, Alabama	December 2, 2023	20,183
2024	[[2024 Marshall Thundering Herd football team|Marshall]]	31–3	Louisiana	Cajun Field • Lafayette, Louisiana	December 7, 2024	20,067
2025	[[2025 James Madison Dukes football team|James Madison]]	31–14	Troy	Bridgeforth Stadium • Harrisonburg, Virginia	December 6, 2025	19,836

== Bowl games ==
As of the 2017 season, the Sun Belt Conference has 5 bowl game tie-ins. The following two games will feature a Sun Belt team every season.

Name	Location	Opposing Conference
New Orleans Bowl	New Orleans, Louisiana	CUSA
68 Ventures Bowl	Mobile, Alabama	MAC

Three of the following games will feature a Sun Belt team every year, as determined by an ESPN Events "flex model".

Name	Location
Boca Raton Bowl	Boca Raton, Florida
Camellia Bowl	Montgomery, Alabama
Cure Bowl	Orlando, Florida
Famous Idaho Potato Bowl	Boise, Idaho
First Responder Bowl	University Park, Texas
Frisco Bowl	Frisco, Texas
Myrtle Beach Bowl	Conway, South Carolina
New Mexico Bowl	Albuquerque, New Mexico

== Rivalries ==
=== Conference play ===
Teams		Rivalry Name	Trophy	Meetings	Record	Series Leader	Current Streak
Appalachian State	Georgia Southern	Deeper Than Hate	–	38	21–16–1	Appalachian State	Georgia Southern (1)
Appalachian State	Marshall	Old Mountain Feud	–	27	16–11	Appalachian State	Marshall (1)
Georgia State	Georgia Southern	Modern Day Hate	–	11	6–5	Georgia State	Georgia Southern (2)
James Madison	Old Dominion	Royal Rivalry	Crown (all sports)	5	3–2	James Madison	James Madison (3)
Louisiana	Louisiana–Monroe	Battle on the Bayou	Wooden Boot	60	33–26	Louisiana	Louisiana (2)
South Alabama	Troy	Battle for the Belt	Championship Belt	13	9–4	Troy	South Alabama (1)

=== Non-conference play ===
Teams		Rivalry Name	Trophy	Meetings (last)	Record	Series leader
Appalachian State	Western Carolina	Battle for the Old Mountain Jug	Old Mountain Jug	78 (2013)	58–19–1	Appalachian State
Arkansas State	Memphis	Paint Bucket Bowl	—	62 (2023)	33–23–5	Memphis
Coastal Carolina	Liberty	Coastal Carolina–Liberty	—	15 (2020)	8–7	Liberty
James Madison	Delaware	Delaware–James Madison	—	27 (2021)	14–13	Delaware
James Madison	Richmond	James Madison–Richmond	—	39 (2021)	21–18	James Madison
James Madison	William & Mary	James Madison–William & Mary	—	44 (2021)	27–17	James Madison
Louisiana	Lamar	Lamar–Louisiana	Sabine Shoe	34 (2012)	22–11	Louisiana
Louisiana	Louisiana Tech	Louisiana–Louisiana Tech	—	87 (2015)	48–33–6	Louisiana Tech
Louisiana	McNeese State	Louisiana–McNeese State	Cajun Crown	38 (2016)	20–16–2	McNeese State
Louisiana	Southeastern Louisiana	Louisiana–Southeastern Louisiana	Cypress Mug	41 (2022)	21–17–3	Louisiana
Louisiana–Monroe	Louisiana Tech	Louisiana Tech vs. Louisiana–Monroe	—	43 (2000)	29–13	Louisiana Tech
Louisiana–Monroe	Northwestern State	Louisiana–Monroe vs. Northwestern State	—	48 (2005)	28–19–1	Northwestern State
Marshall	East Carolina	East Carolina–Marshall	—	17 (2023)	11–6	East Carolina
Marshall	Ohio	Battle for the Bell	The Bell	60 (2019)	33–21–6	Ohio
Marshall	West Virginia	Friends of Coal Bowl	—	12 (2012)	12–0	West Virginia
Old Dominion	Norfolk State	Norfolk State–Old Dominion	—	4 (2019)	4–0	Old Dominion
Old Dominion	William & Mary	Battle for the Silver Mace	Norfolk Mace	3 (2012)	2–1	Old Dominion
Southern Miss	Louisiana Tech	Rivalry in Dixie	—	53 (2021)	36–17	Southern Miss
Southern Miss	Memphis	Black and Blue Bowl	—	63 (2012)	40–22–1	Southern Miss
Southern Miss	Tulane	Battle for the Bell	The Bell	34 (2023)	24–10	Southern Miss
Texas State	Nicholls	Battle for the Paddle	Paddle	31 (2019)	16–15	Nicholls
Texas State	UTSA	I-35 Rivalry	The I-35 Trophy	6 (2024)	5–1	UTSA
Troy	Jacksonville State	Battle for the Ol' School Bell	–	63 (2001)	32–29–2	Jacksonville State
Troy	Middle Tennessee	Battle for the Palladium	Palladium	22 (2020)	13–9	Middle Tennessee

== Yearly standings ==
2001 Sun Belt Conference football standings
	Conf.			Overall
Team	W		L	W		L
North Texas +	5	–	1	5	–	7
Middle Tennessee +	5	–	1	8	–	3
New Mexico State	4	–	2	5	–	7
Louisiana–Lafayette	2	–	4	3	–	8
Arkansas State	2	–	4	2	–	9
Louisiana–Monroe	2	–	4	2	–	9
Idaho	1	–	5	1	–	10
+ – Conference co-champions

2002 Sun Belt Conference football standings
	Conf.			Overall
Team	W		L	W		L
North Texas $	6	–	0	8	–	5
New Mexico State	5	–	1	7	–	5
Arkansas State	3	–	3	6	–	7
Middle Tennessee	2	–	4	4	–	8
Louisiana–Lafayette	2	–	4	3	–	9
Louisiana–Monroe	2	–	4	3	–	9
Idaho	1	–	5	2	–	10
$ – Conference champion

2003 Sun Belt Conference football standings
	Conf.			Overall
Team	W		L	W		L
North Texas $	7	–	0	9	–	4
Louisiana–Lafayette	3	–	2	4	–	8
Arkansas State	3	–	3	5	–	7
Middle Tennessee	3	–	3	4	–	8
Utah State	3	–	3	3	–	9
Idaho	3	–	4	3	–	9
New Mexico State	2	–	5	3	–	9
Louisiana–Monroe	1	–	5	1	–	11
$ – Conference champion

2004 Sun Belt Conference football standings
	Conf.			Overall
Team	W		L	W		L
North Texas $	7	–	0	7	–	5
Troy State	4	–	2	7	–	5
New Mexico State	3	–	2	5	–	6
Middle Tennessee	4	–	4	5	–	6
Louisiana–Monroe	3	–	3	5	–	6
Arkansas State	3	–	4	3	–	8
Louisiana–Lafayette	2	–	5	4	–	7
Utah State	2	–	5	3	–	8
Idaho	2	–	5	3	–	9
$ – Conference champion

2005 Sun Belt Conference football standings
	Conf.			Overall
Team	W		L	W		L
Arkansas State +	5	–	2	6	–	6
Louisiana–Lafayette +	5	–	2	6	–	5
Louisiana–Monroe +	5	–	2	5	–	6
Middle Tennessee	3	–	4	4	–	7
Troy	3	–	4	4	–	7
Florida Atlantic	2	–	5	2	–	9
North Texas	2	–	5	2	–	9
FIU†	0	–	4	0	–	6
+ – Conference co-champions; † – The NCAA vacated all 5 of FIU's (3–4, 5–6) wins

2006 Sun Belt Conference football standings
	Conf.			Overall
Team	W		L	W		L
Troy +	6	–	1	8	–	5
Middle Tennessee +	6	–	1	7	–	6
Arkansas State	4	–	3	6	–	6
Florida Atlantic	4	–	3	5	–	7
Louisiana–Lafayette	3	–	4	6	–	6
Louisiana–Monroe	3	–	4	4	–	8
North Texas	2	–	5	3	–	9
FIU	0	–	7	0	–	12
+ – Conference co-champions

2007 Sun Belt Conference football standings
	Conf.			Overall
Team	W		L	W		L
Florida Atlantic +	6	–	1	8	–	5
Troy +	6	–	1	8	–	4
Middle Tennessee	4	–	3	5	–	7
Louisiana–Monroe	4	–	3	6	–	6
Arkansas State	3	–	4	5	–	7
Louisiana–Lafayette	3	–	4	3	–	9
FIU	1	–	6	1	–	11
North Texas	1	–	6	2	–	10
+ – Conference co-champions

2008 Sun Belt Conference football standings
	Conf.			Overall
Team	W		L	W		L
Troy $	6	–	1	8	–	5
Louisiana–Lafayette	5	–	2	6	–	6
Florida Atlantic	4	–	3	7	–	6
Arkansas State	4	–	3	6	–	6
FIU	3	–	4	5	–	7
Middle Tennessee	3	–	4	5	–	7
Louisiana–Monroe	3	–	4	4	–	8
North Texas	0	–	7	1	–	11
$ – Conference champion

2009 Sun Belt Conference football standings
	Conf.			Overall
Team	W		L	W		L
Troy $	8	–	0	9	–	4
Middle Tennessee	7	–	1	10	–	3
Louisiana–Monroe	5	–	3	6	–	6
Florida Atlantic	5	–	3	5	–	7
Louisiana–Lafayette	4	–	4	6	–	6
Arkansas State	3	–	5	4	–	8
FIU	3	–	5	3	–	9
North Texas	1	–	7	2	–	10
Western Kentucky	0	–	8	0	–	12
$ – Conference champion

2010 Sun Belt Conference football standings
	Conf.			Overall
Team	W		L	W		L
Troy +	6	–	2	8	–	5
FIU +	6	–	2	7	–	6
Middle Tennessee	5	–	3	6	–	7
Louisiana–Monroe	4	–	4	5	–	7
Arkansas State	4	–	4	4	–	8
Florida Atlantic	3	–	5	4	–	8
Louisiana–Lafayette	3	–	5	3	–	9
North Texas	3	–	5	3	–	9
Western Kentucky	2	–	6	2	–	10
+ – Conference co-champions

2011 Sun Belt Conference football standings
	Conf.			Overall
Team	W		L	W		L
Arkansas State $	8	–	0	10	–	3
Western Kentucky	7	–	1	7	–	5
FIU	5	–	3	8	–	5
North Texas	4	–	4	5	–	7
Louisiana–Monroe	3	–	5	4	–	8
Troy	2	–	6	3	–	9
Louisiana–Lafayette *	1	–	2	1	–	4
Middle Tennessee	1	–	7	2	–	10
Florida Atlantic	0	–	8	1	–	11
$ – Conference champion; * – Louisiana–Lafayette vacated 8 wins including 5 in conference due to NCAA violations.

2012 Sun Belt Conference football standings
	Conf.			Overall
Team	W		L	W		L
Arkansas State $	7	–	1	10	–	3
Louisiana–Monroe	6	–	2	8	–	5
Middle Tennessee	6	–	2	8	–	4
Louisiana–Lafayette *	4	–	2	5	–	4
Western Kentucky	4	–	4	7	–	6
Troy	3	–	5	5	–	7
North Texas	3	–	5	4	–	8
Florida Atlantic	2	–	6	3	–	9
FIU	2	–	6	3	–	9
South Alabama **	1	–	7	2	–	11
$ – Conference champion; * – Louisiana–Lafayette vacated 4 wins due to NCAA violations. ** – South Alabama was ineligible for the conference title or a bowl game as part of their transition to the FBS.

2013 Sun Belt Conference football standings
	Conf.			Overall
Team	W		L	W		L
Arkansas State $	5	–	2	8	–	5
Western Kentucky	4	–	3	8	–	4
South Alabama	4	–	3	6	–	6
Troy	4	–	3	6	–	6
Louisiana–Monroe	4	–	3	6	–	6
Texas State	2	–	5	6	–	6
Louisiana–Lafayette *	0	–	2	1	–	4
Georgia State **	0	–	7	0	–	12
$ – Conference champion; * – Louisiana–Lafayette vacated eight wins due to NCAA violations ** – Georgia State ineligible for postseason play due to FCS-to-FBS transition rules

2014 Sun Belt Conference football standings
	Conf.			Overall
Team	W		L	W		L
Georgia Southern * $	8	–	0	9	–	3
Louisiana–Lafayette ***	5	–	1	7	–	4
Appalachian State *	6	–	2	7	–	5
Texas State	5	–	3	7	–	5
Arkansas State	5	–	3	7	–	6
South Alabama	5	–	3	6	–	7
Louisiana–Monroe	3	–	5	4	–	8
Troy	3	–	5	3	–	9
New Mexico State	1	–	7	2	–	10
Idaho **	1	–	7	1	–	10
Georgia State	0	–	8	1	–	11
$ – Conference champion; * – Appalachian State and Georgia Southern ineligible for postseason play due to FCS-to-FBS transition rules ** – Idaho ineligible for postseason play due to APR penalties *** – Louisiana–Lafayette vacated 2 wins due to NCAA violations

2015 Sun Belt Conference football standings
	Conf.			Overall
Team	W		L	W		L
Arkansas State $	8	–	0	9	–	4
Appalachian State	7	–	1	11	–	2
Georgia Southern	6	–	2	9	–	4
Georgia State	5	–	3	6	–	7
South Alabama	3	–	5	5	–	7
Idaho	3	–	5	4	–	8
Louisiana–Lafayette	3	–	5	4	–	8
Troy	3	–	5	4	–	8
New Mexico State	3	–	5	3	–	9
Texas State	2	–	6	3	–	9
Louisiana–Monroe	1	–	7	2	–	11
$ – Conference champion

2016 Sun Belt Conference football standings
	Conf.			Overall
Team	W		L	W		L
Appalachian State +	7	–	1	10	–	3
Arkansas State +	7	–	1	8	–	5
Troy	6	–	2	10	–	3
Idaho	6	–	2	9	–	4
Louisiana–Lafayette	5	–	3	6	–	7
Georgia Southern	4	–	4	5	–	7
Louisiana–Monroe	3	–	5	4	–	8
South Alabama	2	–	6	6	–	7
Georgia State	2	–	6	3	–	9
New Mexico State	2	–	6	3	–	9
Texas State	0	–	8	2	–	10
+ – Conference co-champions

2017 Sun Belt Conference football standings
	Conf.			Overall
Team	W		L	W		L
Troy +	7	–	1	11	–	2
Appalachian State +	7	–	1	9	–	4
Arkansas State	6	–	2	7	–	5
Georgia State	5	–	3	7	–	5
New Mexico State	4	–	4	7	–	6
Louisiana	4	–	4	5	–	7
Louisiana–Monroe	4	–	4	4	–	8
Idaho	3	–	5	4	–	8
South Alabama	3	–	5	4	–	8
Coastal Carolina *	2	–	6	3	–	9
Georgia Southern	2	–	6	2	–	10
Texas State	1	–	7	2	–	10
+ – Conference co-champions; * – Ineligible for postseason play due to FCS-to-FBS transition rules

2018 Sun Belt Conference football standings
	Conf.			Overall
Team	W		L	W		L
East Division
Appalachian State xy$	7	–	1	11	–	2
Troy x	7	–	1	10	–	3
Georgia Southern	6	–	2	10	–	3
Coastal Carolina	2	–	6	5	–	7
Georgia State	1	–	7	2	–	10
West Division
Louisiana xy	5	–	3	7	–	7
Arkansas State x	5	–	3	8	–	5
Louisiana–Monroe	4	–	4	6	–	6
South Alabama	2	–	6	3	–	9
Texas State	1	–	7	3	–	9
Championship: Appalachian State 30, Louisiana 19
$ – Conference champion; x – Division champion/co-champions; y – Championship game participant

2019 Sun Belt Conference football standings
	Conf.			Overall
Team	W		L	W		L
East Division
No. 19 Appalachian State x$	7	–	1	13	–	1
Georgia Southern	5	–	3	7	–	6
Georgia State	4	–	4	7	–	6
Troy	3	–	5	5	–	7
Coastal Carolina	2	–	6	5	–	7
West Division
Louisiana x	7	–	1	11	–	3
Arkansas State	5	–	3	8	–	5
Louisiana–Monroe	4	–	4	5	–	7
Texas State	2	–	6	3	–	9
South Alabama	1	–	7	2	–	10
Championship: Appalachian State 45, Louisiana 38
$ – Conference champion; x – Division champion/co-champions; Rankings from AP Poll

2020 Sun Belt Conference football standings
	Conf.			Overall
Team	W		L	W		L
East Division
No. 14 Coastal Carolina xy+	8	–	0	11	–	1
Appalachian State	6	–	2	9	–	3
Georgia Southern	4	–	4	8	–	5
Georgia State	4	–	4	6	–	4
Troy	3	–	4	5	–	6
West Division
No. 15 Louisiana xy+	7	–	1	10	–	1
South Alabama	3	–	5	4	–	7
Arkansas State	2	–	6	4	–	7
Texas State	2	–	6	2	–	10
Louisiana–Monroe	0	–	7	0	–	10
Championship: Louisiana at Coastal Carolina (Canceled)
+ – Conference co-champions; x – Division champion/co-champions; y – Championship game participant; Rankings from AP Poll

2021 Sun Belt Conference football standings
	Conf.			Overall
Team	W		L	W		L
East Division
Appalachian State xy	7	–	1	10	–	4
Georgia State	6	–	2	8	–	5
Coastal Carolina	6	–	2	11	–	2
Troy	3	–	5	5	–	7
Georgia Southern	2	–	6	3	–	9
West Division
No. 16 Louisiana xy$	8	–	0	13	–	1
Texas State	3	–	5	4	–	8
Louisiana–Monroe	2	–	6	4	–	8
South Alabama	2	–	6	5	–	7
Arkansas State	1	–	7	2	–	10
Championship: Louisiana 24, Appalachian State 16
$ – Conference champion; x – Division champion/co-champions; y – Championship game participant; Rankings from AP Poll

2022 Sun Belt Conference football standings
	Conf.			Overall
Team	W		L	W		L
East Division
James Madison* x	6	–	2	8	–	3
Coastal Carolina xy	6	–	2	9	–	4
Marshall	5	–	3	9	–	4
Georgia Southern	3	–	5	6	–	7
Appalachian State	3	–	5	6	–	6
Georgia State	3	–	5	4	–	8
Old Dominion	2	–	6	3	–	9
West Division
No. 19 Troy xy$	7	–	1	12	–	2
South Alabama x	7	–	1	10	–	3
Southern Miss	4	–	4	7	–	6
Louisiana	4	–	4	6	–	7
Louisiana–Monroe	3	–	5	4	–	8
Texas State	2	–	6	4	–	8
Arkansas State	1	–	7	3	–	9
Championship: Troy 45, Coastal Carolina 26
$ – Conference champion; x – Division champion/co-champions; y – Championship game participant; * – Ineligible for postseason play due to FCS-to-FBS transition rules; Rankings from AP Poll

2023 Sun Belt Conference football standings
	Conf.			Overall
Team	W		L	W		L
East Division
James Madison* x	7	–	1	11	–	2
Appalachian State y	6	–	2	9	–	5
Coastal Carolina	5	–	3	8	–	5
Old Dominion	5	–	3	6	–	7
Georgia State	3	–	5	7	–	6
Marshall	3	–	5	6	–	7
Georgia Southern	3	–	5	6	–	7
West Division
Troy xy$	7	–	1	11	–	3
Texas State	4	–	4	8	–	5
Arkansas State	4	–	4	6	–	7
South Alabama	4	–	4	7	–	6
Louisiana	3	–	5	6	–	7
Southern Miss	2	–	6	3	–	9
Louisiana–Monroe	0	–	8	2	–	10
Championship: Troy 49, Appalachian State 23
$ – Conference champion; x – Division champion/co-champions; y – Championship game participant; * – Ineligible for postseason play due to FCS-to-FBS transition rules

2024 Sun Belt Conference football standings
	Conf.			Overall
Team	W		L	W		L
East Division
Marshall xy$	7	–	1	10	–	3
Georgia Southern	6	–	2	8	–	5
James Madison	4	–	4	9	–	4
Old Dominion	4	–	4	5	–	7
Coastal Carolina	3	–	5	6	–	7
Appalachian State	3	–	5	5	–	6
Georgia State	1	–	7	3	–	9
West Division
Louisiana xy	7	–	1	10	–	4
Texas State	5	–	3	8	–	5
Arkansas State	5	–	3	8	–	5
South Alabama	5	–	3	7	–	6
Louisiana–Monroe	3	–	5	5	–	7
Troy	3	–	5	4	–	8
Southern Miss	0	–	8	1	–	11
Championship: Marshall 31, Louisiana 3
$ – Conference champion; x – Division champion/co-champions; y – Championship game participant

2025 Sun Belt Conference football standings
	Conf.			Overall
Team	W		L	W		L
East Division
No. 19 James Madison xy$^	8	–	0	12	–	2
Old Dominion	6	–	2	10	–	3
Coastal Carolina	5	–	3	6	–	7
Georgia Southern	4	–	4	7	–	6
Marshall	3	–	5	5	–	7
Appalachian State	2	–	6	5	–	8
Georgia State	0	–	8	1	–	11
West Division
Troy xy	6	–	2	8	–	6
Southern Miss	5	–	3	7	–	6
Louisiana	5	–	3	6	–	7
Arkansas State	5	–	3	7	–	6
Texas State	3	–	5	7	–	6
South Alabama	3	–	5	4	–	8
Louisiana–Monroe	1	–	7	3	–	9
Championship: James Madison 31, Troy 14
^ – College Football Playoff participant; $ – Conference champion; x – Division champion/co-champions; y – Championship game participant; Rankings from AP Poll
