= NCAA Division I FBS field goal leaders =

College American football records

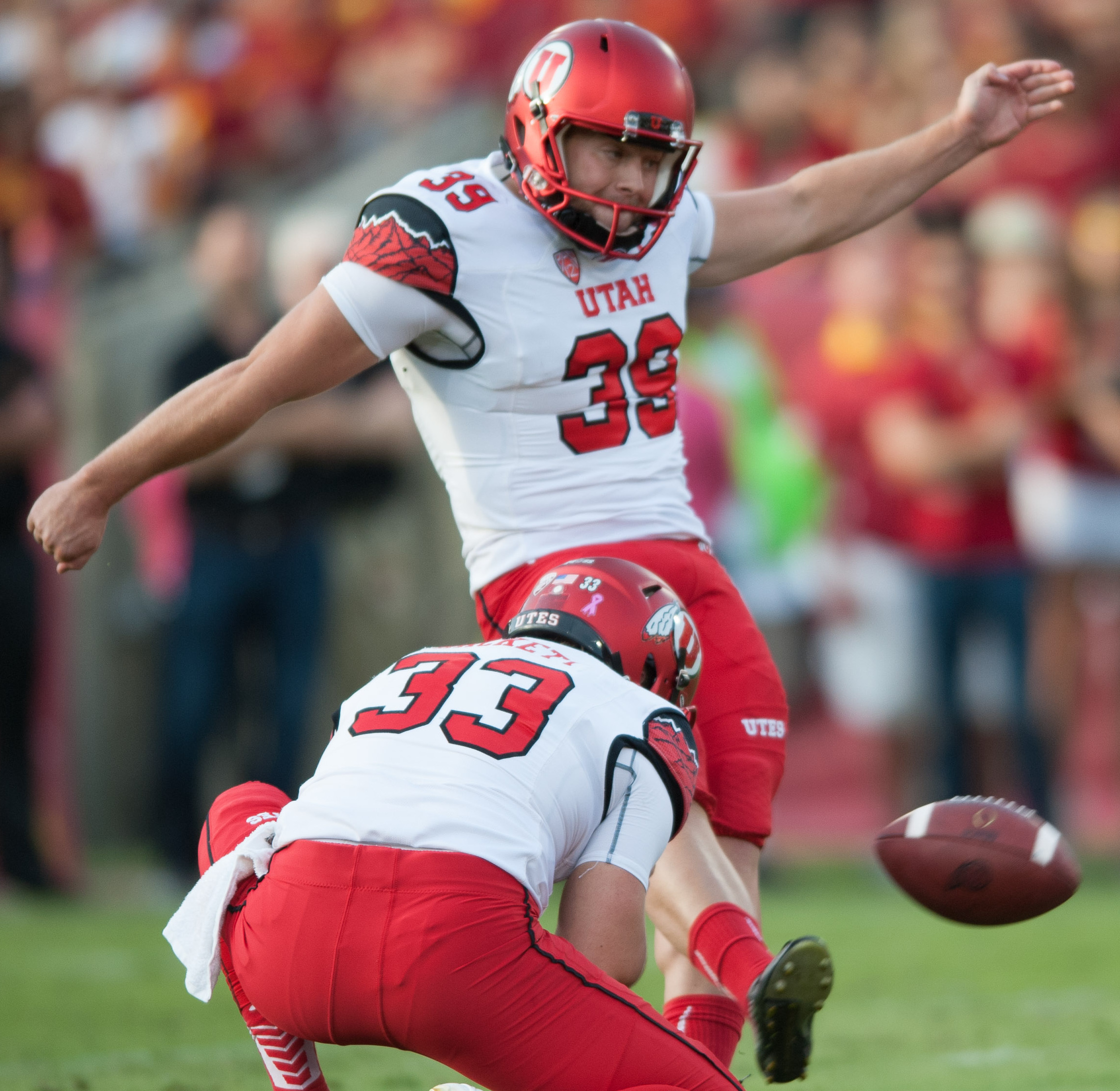
Andy Phillips with Utah in 2015. Phillips finished his career with 84 field goals and 427 points scored.

The NCAA Division I FBS field goal leaders are career, single-season, and single-game leaders in field goal kicking. These lists are dominated by more recent players for several reasons:

- Since 1955, seasons have increased from 10 games to 11 and then 12 games in length.
- The NCAA didn't allow freshmen to play varsity football until 1972 (with the exception of the World War II years), allowing players to have four-year careers.
- Bowl games only began counting toward single-season and career statistics in 2002. Players who have played since then often have an extra game each year to accumulate statistics.
- In recent decades, starting with the Southeastern Conference in 1992, FBS conferences have introduced their own championship games, which have always counted fully toward single-season and career statistics.
- The NCAA ruled that the 2020 season, heavily disrupted by COVID-19, would not count against the athletic eligibility of any football player. This gave every player active in that season the opportunity for five years of eligibility instead of the normal four.
- Since 2018, players have been allowed to participate in as many as four games in a redshirt season; previously, playing in even one game "burned" the redshirt. Since 2024, postseason games have not counted against the four-game limit. These changes to redshirt rules have given very recent players the opportunity for several extra games to accumulate statistics.
- Only seasons in which a team was considered to be a part of the Football Bowl Subdivision are included in these lists. In particular, Cole Tracy kicked 97 field goals across his career, which would be tied for the career record, but 68 of them were at Division III Assumption, and only 29 in the FBS.

Legend
Active FBS Player

All statistics are current through the completion of the 2025 NCAA Division I FBS football season.

== Field goals ==
=== Career ===
#	Player	FGM	Seasons
1	Christopher Dunn	97	2018 2019 2020 2021 2022 NC State
2	Zane Gonzalez	96	2013 2014 2015 2016 Arizona State
3	Jonah Dalmas	93	2020 2021 2022 2023 2024 Boise State
4	Daniel Carlson	92	2014 2015 2016 2017 Auburn
5	Harrison Mevis	89	2020 2021 2022 2023 Missouri
6	Dustin Hopkins	88	2009 2010 2011 2012 Florida State
7	Billy Bennett	87	2000 2001 2002 2003 Georgia
8	Kai Forbath	85	2007 2008 2009 2010 UCLA
8	Andre Szmyt	85	2018 2019 2020 2021 2022 Syracuse
10	Andy Phillips	84	2013 2014 2015 2016 Utah
10	Will Reichard	84	2019 2020 2021 2022 2023 Alabama
12	Leigh Tiffin	83	2006 2007 2008 2009 Alabama
12	Brandon Talton	83	2019 2020 2021 2022 2023 Nevada
14	Jake Elliott	81	2013 2014 2015 2016 Memphis
14	Jonathan Barnes	81	2014 2015 2016 2017 Louisiana Tech

#	Player	FGM	Seasons
16	Jeff Jaeger	80	1983 1984 1985 1986 Washington
16	Nick Novak	80	2001 2002 2003 2004 Maryland
16	Jeremy Ito	80	2004 2005 2006 2007 Rutgers
16	Alexis Serna	80	2004 2005 2006 2007 Oregon State
16	Matt Weller	80	2009 2010 2011 2012 Ohio
16	Rodrigo Blankenship	80	2016 2017 2018 2019 Georgia
16	Nick Sciba	80	2018 2019 2020 2021 Wake Forest
23	John Lee	79	1982 1983 1984 1985 UCLA
23	Jason Elam	79	1988 1989 1990 1991 1992 Hawaii
23	Jaden Oberkrom	79	2012 2013 2014 2015 TCU
23	Anders Carlson	79	2018 2019 2020 2021 2022 Auburn
23	Matthew Trickett	79	2018 2019 2020 Kent State ᛫ 2021 2022 Minnesota
28	Luis Zendejas	78	1981 1982 1983 1984 Arizona State
28	Philip Doyle	78	1987 1988 1989 1990 Alabama
28	Kevin Kelly	78	2005 2006 2007 2008 Penn State
28	Ross Martin	78	2012 2013 2014 2015 Duke
28	Joey Slye	78	2014 2015 2016 2017 Virginia Tech
28	Blake Grupe	78	2018 2019 2020 2021 Arkansas State ᛫ 2022 Notre Dame

=== Single season ===
Under NCAA rules in 1984, bowl game statistics were not counted toward a player's season totals. John Lee, the placekicker for the 1984 UCLA Bruins, finished that season with 29 field goals in the regular season. He then kicked three field goals in the 1985 Fiesta Bowl, but those were excluded from his official total. If his Fiesta Bowl performance were included under modern NCAA statistical rules, Lee's 32 field goals would make him the outright single-season FBS field goal leader.

#	Player	FGM	Season
1	Billy Bennett	31	2003 Georgia
1	Lucas Carneiro	31	2025 Ole Miss
3	Leigh Tiffin	30	2009 Alabama
3	Josh Lambert	30	2014 West Virginia
3	Matt Gay	30	2017 Utah
3	Andre Szmyt	30	2018 Syracuse
7	John Lee	29	1984 UCLA
7	John Sullivan	29	2007 New Mexico
7	Randy Bullock	29	2011 Texas A&M
7	Louie Zervos	29	2016 Ohio
7	Cole Tracy	29	2018 LSU
7	Keith Duncan	29	2019 Iowa
7	Matthew Trickett	29	2019 Kent State
7	Jake Moody	29	2022 Michigan
7	Bert Auburn	29	2023 Texas

#	Player	FGM	Season
16	Paul Woodside	28	1982 West Virginia
16	Luis Zendejas	28	1983 Arizona State
16	Nick Browne	28	2003 TCU
16	Justin Medlock	28	2006 UCLA
16	Kai Forbath	28	2009 UCLA
16	Josh Jasper	28	2010 LSU
16	Quinn Sharp	28	2012 Oklahoma State
16	Daniel Carlson	28	2016 Auburn
16	Christopher Dunn	28	2022 NC State
16	Kenneth Almendares	28	2024 Louisiana
26	Fuad Reveiz	27	1982 Tennessee
26	Sebastian Janikowski	27	1998 Florida State
26	Drew Dunning	27	2003 Washington State
26	Gary Cismesia	27	2007 Florida State
26	Dan Bailey	27	2010 Oklahoma State
26	Roberto Aguayo	27	2014 Florida State
26	Greg Huegel	27	2015 Clemson
26	Rodrigo Blankenship	27	2019 Georgia
26	Alex Hale	27	2023 Oklahoma State
26	Graham Nicholson	27	2023 Miami (OH)
26	Kansei Matsuzawa	27	2025 Hawai'i

=== Single game ===
#	Player	FGs	Date	School
1	Mike Prindle	7	Sep. 29, 1984	Western Michigan
1	Dale Klein	7	Oct. 19, 1985	Nebraska
3	6 – many times			

== Field goal percentage ==
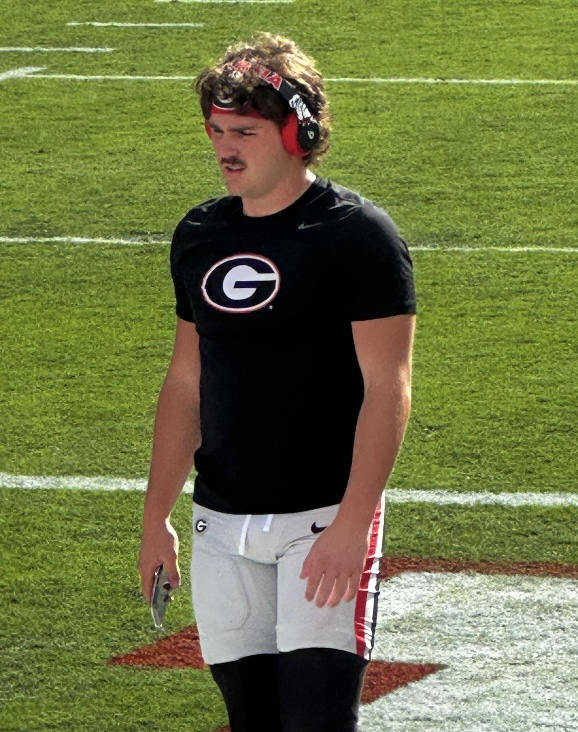
Peyton Woodring with Georgia in 2025. He ranks sixth all-time in NCAA Division I FBS career field goal percentage at 88.1% (58 of 67). Woodring is also a perfect 173 of 173 on extra points and entered the 2026 season with 350 career points.

=== Career ===
Minimum 50 field goal attempts.

#	Player	FG%	Seasons
1	Brett Baer	90.0%	2009–2012 Louisiana
2	Nick Sciba	89.9%	2018–2021 Wake Forest
3	Alex Henery	89.5%	2007–2010 Nebraska
4	Jeff Budzien	88.9%	2010–2013 Northwestern
5	Roberto Aguayo	88.5%	2013–2015 Florida State
6	Peyton Woodring	88.1%	2023–2025 Georgia
7	Lucas Carneiro	87.9%	2022–2025 Ole Miss
8	Chris Manfredini	87.7%	2003–2007 TCU
9	Dom Dzioban	86.8%	2020–2025 Miami (OH)
10	Mason Shipley	86.4%	2022–2025 Texas
10	Nate Freese	86.4%	2010–2013 Boston College
10	Matthew McCrane	86.4%	2014–2017 Kansas State
10	Louie Sakoda	86.4%	2005–2008 Utah
14	Matt Gay	86.2%	2017–2018 Utah
15	Jonah Dalmas	86.1%	2020–2024 Boise State
16	Andres Borregales	86.0%	2021–2024 Miami (FL)
17	Daniel Gutierrez	85.9%	2017–2022 UNLV
17	John Lee	85.9%	1982–1985 UCLA
19	Brandon Pace	85.3%	2003–2006 Virginia Tech
20	Kenneth Almendares	85.2%	2018–2024 Louisiana
21	Jonathan Ruffin	85.1%	2000–2002 Cincinnati
22	Joshua Karty	85.0%	2020–2023 Stanford
22	Zack Long	85.0%	2019–2022 Tulsa
22	Evan McPherson	85.0%	2018–2020 Florida
22	Aidan Schneider	85.0%	2014–2017 Oregon
26	Matt Bosher	84.9%	2007–2010 Miami (FL)
27	Clayton Hatfield	84.7%	2015–2018 Texas Tech
27	Quinn Sharp	84.7%	2009–2012 Oklahoma State
29	Tate Sandell	84.6%	2022–2025 Oklahoma
29	Scott Secor	84.6%	2011–2014 Ball State

=== Single season ===
Many players have made 100% of their field goals in a single season, but Cairo Santos holds the FBS record with 21 field goals without a miss, set while playing for Tulane during the 2012 season.

Minimum 15 field goals made.

#	Player	FG%	FGM	Season
1	Cairo Santos	100.00%	21	2012 Tulane
2	Nate Freese	100.00%	20	2013 Boston College
3	Joshua Karty	100.00%	18	2022 Stanford
4	Austin Lopez	100.00%	17	2012 San Jose State
4	Gabe Brkic	100.00%	17	2019 Oklahoma
6	Mason Shipley	100.00%	15	2023 Texas State

== References and notes ==
"Career Leaders and Records for Passing Yards" (PDF). NCAA.

- Football Bowl Subdivision Records, p. 53. Retrieved 2013-01-05.
- Career Leaders and Records for Field Goals Made. Retrieved 2013-01-06.
