= Christopher Dunn (American football) =

American former football player (born 1999)

Profile
- Position: Placekicker

Personal information
- Born: June 27, 1999 (age 27); Lexington, North Carolina, U.S.
- Listed height: 5 ft 8 in (1.73 m)
- Listed weight: 179 lb (81 kg)

Career information
- High school: North Davidson (Welcome, North Carolina)
- College: NC State (2018–2022)
- NFL draft: 2023: undrafted

Career history
- Los Angeles Rams (2023)*; San Antonio Brahmas (2024)*
- * Offseason or practice squad member only

Awards and highlights
- Lou Groza Award (2022); NCAA All-Time Record Holder in Career Field Goals Made (97); Consensus All-American (2022); First-team All-ACC (2022); 2× Second-team All-ACC (2018, 2019)

Christopher Dunn (born June 27, 1999) is an American former football placekicker. He played college football at NC State.

== Early life ==
Dunn grew up in Lexington, North Carolina, and attended North Davidson High School. He finished his high school career with 271 points scored after making 30-of-48 field goal attempts and 175-of-194 extra points.

== College career ==
Dunn became the NC State Wolfpack's primary kicker entering his freshman season and was named second team All-Atlantic Coast Conference (ACC) after he set school-records with 23 field goals made and 120 points scored. He repeated as a second team All-ACC selection after making 21 field goals on 24 attempts as a sophomore. He elected to use the extra year of eligibility granted to college athletes who played in the 2020 season due to the coronavirus pandemic and return to NC State for a fifth season. Dunn won the Lou Groza Award as the nation's best kicker in 2022, was a first team All-American, and set ACC records for most career points scored and field goals made. In NC State's bowl game, he made four field goals to break the career NCAA Division I FBS field goal leaders record.

== Professional career ==
Pre-draft measurables
Height	Weight	Arm length	Hand span
5 ft 7 5/8 in (1.72 m)	175 lb (79 kg)	29 5/8 in (0.75 m)	8 1/2 in (0.22 m)
All values from NFL Combine

=== Los Angeles Rams ===
Dunn was signed by the Los Angeles Rams as an undrafted free agent on May 1, 2023. He was waived on June 15.

=== San Antonio Brahmas ===
On December 15, 2023, Dunn was signed by the San Antonio Brahmas of the XFL (now UFL). He was removed from the roster on February 15, 2024.
