= Brett Baer (American football) =

American football player (born 1990)

Profile
- Position: Placekicker / Punter

Personal information
- Born: January 30, 1990 (age 36); Brandon, Mississippi, U.S.
- Listed height: 5 ft 11 in (1.80 m)
- Listed weight: 182 lb (83 kg)

Career information
- High school: Brandon (Brandon, Mississippi)
- College: Louisiana (2009–2012)
- NFL draft: 2013: undrafted

Career history
- St. Louis Rams (2013)*
- * Offseason or practice squad member only

Awards and highlights
- 2× First-team All-Sun Belt (2012 (Note: At both punter and placekicker.)); 2× Second-team All-Sun Belt (2011 (Note: At both punter and placekicker.)); NCAA records: Highest career field goal percentage (minimum 50 career field goal attempts): 90%
- Stats at Pro Football Reference

Brett Baer (born January 30, 1990) is an American former professional football placekicker and punter. He played college football for the Louisiana Ragin' Cajuns from 2009 to 2012, where he earned multiple All-Sun Belt Conference honors and set the NCAA Division I FBS record for highest career field goal percentage (Note: Minimum 50 career field goal attempts.), making 45 of 50 field goal attempts (90%). Baer signed with the St. Louis Rams as an undrafted free agent in 2013 but did not appear in a regular-season National Football League (NFL) game.

== College football ==
Baer played college football for the Louisiana Ragin' Cajuns from 2009 to 2012. He played exclusively as a kickoff specialist his freshman year in 2009. In 2010, Baer did not miss a kick all season, making 7 of 7 field goal attempts (100%) and 23 of 23 extra point attempts (100%). In 2011, Baer served as both the placekicker and the punter. As a punter, Baer had a conference-high 79 punts for 3,185 yards (40.3 yards per punt); as a kicker, he converted 18 of 20 field goals (90%) and 46 of 50 extra point attempts (92%). Baer was named Second Team All-Sun Belt as both a placekicker and punter, and kicked the game-winning field goal in the 2011 New Orleans Bowl, giving Louisiana its first bowl victory in program history. As a senior in 2012, he earned First Team All-Sun Belt honors (once again at both the placekicker and punter positions). Baer had 59 punts for 2,478 yards (average of 42.0 yards per punt) and made 20 of 23 field goals (87%) and 53 of 56 extra point attempts (94.6%). After the season, Baer was named a semifinalist for the Lou Groza Award, which goes to the top NCAA Division I FBS placekicker.

Having made 45 of his 50 career field goal attempts in college (90%), Baer holds the record for the highest career field goal percentage in NCAA Division I FBS history (minimum 50 career field goal attempts).

== Professional career ==
After going undrafted in 2013, Baer signed with the St. Louis Rams of the National Football League (NFL) as an undrafted free agent on May 2, 2013. He participated in the team's offseason program and training camp before being released prior to the start of the regular season. He did not sign with another NFL team following his release from the Rams.
