= 2005 Louisiana–Lafayette Ragin' Cajuns football team =

American college football season

2005 Louisiana–Lafayette Ragin' Cajuns football

Sun Belt co-champion
- Conference: Sun Belt Conference
- Record: 6–5 (5–2 Sun Belt)
- Head coach: Rickey Bustle (4th season)
- Offensive coordinator: Rob Christophel (4th season)
- Defensive coordinator: Brent Pry (4th season)
- Home stadium: Cajun Field

2005 Sun Belt Conference football standings
	Conf.			Overall
Team	W		L	W		L
Arkansas State +	5	–	2	6	–	6
Louisiana–Lafayette +	5	–	2	6	–	5
Louisiana–Monroe +	5	–	2	5	–	6
Middle Tennessee	3	–	4	4	–	7
Troy	3	–	4	4	–	7
Florida Atlantic	2	–	5	2	–	9
North Texas	2	–	5	2	–	9
FIU†	0	–	4	0	–	6
+ – Conference co-champions; † – The NCAA vacated all 5 of FIU's (3–4, 5–6) wins

The 2005 Louisiana–Lafayette Ragin' Cajuns football team represented the University of Louisiana at Lafayette as a member of the Sun Belt Conference in the 2005 NCAA Division I-A football season. They were led by fourth-year head coach Rickey Bustle played their home games at Cajun Field in Lafayette, Louisiana.

The 2005 New Orleans Bowl, which was annually played in the Mercedes-Benz Superdome in New Orleans was tagged the "New Orleans Bowl at Lafayette" and moved to Cajun Field, the home stadium of Ragin' Cajuns football, in response to Hurricane Katrina that had destroyed the Superdome a few months earlier

== Preseason ==
=== Sun Belt Media Day ===
==== Preseason Standings ====
Sun Belt Conference Predicted Standings
Predicted finish	Team	(1st Place)
1	North Texas	(7)
2	Troy	
3	Middle Tennessee	
4	Louisiana-Lafayette	
5	Louisiana-Monroe	(1)
6	Arkansas State	
7	Florida Atlantic	
8	Florida International	

==== Preseason All-Conference Team ====
Offense

WR Bill Sampy
OL Brandon Cox

== Schedule ==
Date	Time	Opponent	Site	TV	Result	Attendance
September 3	6:00 pm	at No. 2 Texas*	Darrell K Royal–Texas Memorial Stadium; Austin, TX	FSN	L 60–3	82,519
September 10	6:00 p.m.	at Eastern Michigan*	Rynearson Stadium; Ypsilanti, MI		L 31–10	5,628
September 17	7:00 p.m.	Northwestern State*	Cajun Field; Lafayette, LA		W 49–28	17,341
October 1	8:00 p.m.	UCF*	Cajun Field; Lafayette, LA		L 24–21	18,262
October 6	8:00 p.m.	Florida Atlantic	Cajun Field; Lafayette, LA	ESPN+	L 10–28	14,208
October 13	6:30 p.m.	at Arkansas State	Indian Field; Jonesboro, AR	ESPNU	L 39–36	12,944
October 22	4:00 p.m.	at Middle Tennessee	Johnny "Red" Floyd Stadium; Murfreesboro, TN		W 13–10	17,044
October 29	4:00 p.m.	Troy	Cajun Field; Lafayette, LA	CSS	W 31–28 ^{OT}	21,204
November 5	6:00 p.m.	at North Texas	Fouts Field; Denton, TX		W 31–28	14,153
November 12	6:00 p.m.	FIU	Cajun Field; Lafayette, LA		W 28–7	16,942
November 26	2:30 p.m.	Louisiana–Monroe	Malone Stadium; Monroe, LA (Battle on the Bayou)		W 54–21	15,505
*Non-conference game; Rankings from AP Poll released prior to the game; All times are in Central time

== Game summaries ==
=== @ Texas ===
Louisiana-Lafayette at Texas – Game summary

Quarter	1	2	3	4	Total
Ragin' Cajuns	3	0	0	0	3
No. 2 Longhorns	13	26	14	7	60

at Darrell K Royal–Texas Memorial Stadium, Austin, TX

- Date: September 3
- Game time: 6:00 p.m. CST
- Game weather: 90 °F (32 °C); partly cloudy
- Game attendance: 82,519
- Referee: Jon Bible

Game information

First quarter

- UT - Selvin Young 9-yard TD run, Richmond McGee kick no good, 8:36 (UT 6-0)
- ULL - Sean Cominskey 47-yard field goal, 5:33 (UT 6-3)
- UT - Jamaal Charles 14-yard TD run, McGee kick good, 3:08 (UT 13-3)

Second quarter

- UT - Nate Jones 9-yard TD pass from Vince Young, McGee kick no good, 13:42 (UT 19-3)
- UT - Ramonce Taylor 30-yard TD run, McGee kick no good, 7:41 (UT 25-3)
- UT - David Thomas 21-yard TD pass from Young, McGee kick good, 6:22 (UT 32-3)
- UT - Thomas 8-yard TD pass from Young, McGee kick good, 0:37 (UT 39-3)

Third quarter

- UT - Young 3-yard TD run, McGee kick good, 8:22 (UT 46-3)
- UT - Kyle Phillips 14-yard TD run, David Pino kick good, 4:33 (UT 53-3)

Fourth quarter

- UT - Phillips 23-yard TD run, Pino kick good, 14:13 (UT 60-3)

Top passers

- UT - Vince Young - 13/17, 173 yards, 3 TD, INT
- ULL - Jerry Babb - 9/18, 109 yards

Top rushers

- UT - Jamaal Charles - 14 carries, 135 yards, TD
- ULL - Caleb Rubin - 9 carries, 34 yards

Top receivers

- UT - Brian Carter - 3 receptions, 65 yards
- ULL - Derrick Smith - 6 receptions, 78 yards

=== @ Eastern Michigan ===
Louisiana-Lafayette at Eastern Michigan – Game summary

Quarter	1	2	3	4	Total
Ragin' Cajuns	0	3	7	0	10
Eagles	14	10	7	0	31

at Rynearson Stadium, Ypsilanti, MI

- Date: September 10
- Game time: 6:00 p.m. CST
- Game weather: 82 °F (28 °C); clear
- Game attendance: 5,628
- Referee: William Alge

Game information

First quarter

- EMU - A. J. Bennett 38-yard TD pass from Matt Bohnet, Andrew Wellock kick good, 11:18 (EMU 7-0)
- EMU - Bohnet 3-yard TD run, Wellock kick good, 5:55 (EMU 14-0)

Second quarter

- EMU - Eric Deslauriers 14-yard TD pass from Bohnet, Wellock kick good, 7:32 (EMU 21-0)
- ULL - Sean Comiskey 24-yard field goal, 2:16 (EMU 21-3)
- EMU - Wellock 24-yard field goal, 0:05 (EMU 24-3)

Third quarter

- ULL - Tyrell Fenroy 2-yard TD run, Comiskey kick good, 9:21 (EMU 24-10)
- EMU - Bohnet 1-yard TD run, Wellock kick good, 2:44 (EMU 31-10)

Top passers

- EMU - Matt Bohnet - 26/34, 263 yards, 2 TD
- ULL - Jerry Babb - 21/29, 228 yards

Top rushers

- EMU - Matt Bohnet - 19 carries, 85 yards, 2 TD
- ULL - Jerry Babb - 12 carries, 77 yards

Top receivers

- EMU - A. J. Bennett - 9 receptions, 94 yards, TD
- ULL - Derrick Smith - 5 receptions, 53 yards

=== Northwestern State ===
Northwestern State at Louisiana-Lafayette – Game summary

Quarter	1	2	3	4	Total
Demons	0	21	0	7	28
Ragin' Cajuns	13	7	22	7	49

at Cajun Field, Lafayette, LA

- Date: September 17
- Game time: 7:00 p.m. CST
- Game weather: 84 °F (29 °C); clearing overcast
- Game attendance: 17,341
- Referee: Ken Williamson

Game information

First quarter

- ULL - Jerry Babb 14-yard TD run, Sean Comiskey kick no good, 12:42 (ULL 6-0)
- ULL - Derrick Smith 18-yard TD pass from Babb, Comiskey kick good, 9:55 (ULL 13-0)

Second quarter

- ULL - Kevin Robbins 22-yard TD pass from Babb, Comiskey kick god, 14:53 (ULL 20-0)
- NSU - Clayton Broyles 18-yard TD pass from Davon Vinson, Robert Weeks kick good, 12:21 (ULL 20-7)
- NSU - Titus May 2-yard TD pass from Vinson, Weeks kick good, 3:07 (ULL 20-14)
- NSU - Vinson 12-yard TD run, Weeks kick good, 0:22 (NSU 21-20)

Third quarter

- ULL - Smith 25-yard TD pass from Babb, Josh Harrison two-point conversion run good, 9:53 (ULL 28-21)
- ULL - Smith 7-yard TD run, Comiskey kick good, 1:53 (ULL 35-21)
- ULL - Abdule Levier 1-yard TD run, Comiskey kick good, 0:23 (ULL 42-21)

Fourth quarter

- NSU - Anthony Holmes 2-yard TD run, Weeks kick good, 11:46 (ULL 42-28)
- ULL - Levier 59-yard TD run, Comiskey kick good, 3:18 (ULL 49-28)

Top passers

- ULL - Jerry Babb - 18/28, 222 yards, 3 TD, 2 INT
- NSU - Dave Vinson - 14/27, 180 yards, 2 TD, INT

Top rushers

- ULL - Tyrell Fenroy - 15 carries, 163 yards
- NSU - Dave Vinson - 18 carries, 108 yards, TD

Top receivers

- ULL - Bill Sampy - 5 receptions, 90 yards
- NSU - Chris Miller - 4 receptions, 58 yards

=== UCF ===
UCF at Louisiana-Lafayette – Game summary

Quarter	1	2	3	4	Total
Knights	14	7	0	3	24
Ragin' Cajuns	0	7	14	0	21

at Cajun Field, Lafayette, LA

- Date: October 1
- Game time: 7:00 p.m. CST
- Game weather: 84 °F (29 °C); partly cloudy
- Game attendance: 18,262
- Referee: Barry Anderson

Game information

First quarter

- UCF - Brandon Marshall 60-yard TD pass from Steven Moffett, Matt Prater kick good, 9:39 (UCF 7-0)
- UCF - Dontavius Wilcox 11-yard TD pass from Moffett, Prater kick good, 0:43 (UCF 14-0)

Second quarter

- UCF - Marshall 15-yard TD pass from Moffett, Prater kick good, 9:30 (UCF 21-0)
- ULL - Abdule Levier 1-yard TD run, Sean Comiskey kick good, 6:51 (UCF 21-7)

Third quarter

- ULL - Booker Jenkins 6-yard TD run, Comiskey kick good, 5:20 (UCF 21-14)
- ULL - Levier 6-yard TD run, Comiskey kick good, 1:51 (TIE 21-21)

Fourth quarter

- UCF - John Brown 28-yard field goal, 0:02 (UCF 24-21)

Top passers

- UCF - Steven Moffett - 15/26, 232 yards, 3 TD, INT
- ULL - Michael Desormeaux - 14/26, 119 yards, 2 INT

Top rushers

- UCF - Kevin Smith - 25 carries, 110 yards
- ULL - Michael Desormeaux - 17 carries, 76 yards

Top receivers

- UCF - Brandon Marshall - 5 receptions, 107 yards, TD
- ULL - Bill Sampy - 4 receptions, 38 yards

=== Florida Atlantic ===
Florida Atlantic at Louisiana-Lafayette – Game summary

Quarter	1	2	3	4	Total
Owls	7	0	0	21	28
Ragin' Cajuns	10	0	0	0	10

at Cajun Field, Lafayette, LA

- Date: October 6
- Game time: 7:00 p.m. CST
- Game weather: 86 °F (30 °C); clear
- Game attendance: 14,208
- Referee: Jim Jackson

Game information

First quarter

- ULL - Tyrell Fenroy 1-yard TD run, Sean Comiskey kick good, 11:49 (ULL 7-0)
- FAU - D. Walker 5-yard TD pass from Danny Embick, Daniel Kennard kick good, 4:15 (TIE 7-7)
- ULL- Comiskey 34-yard field goal, 1:20 (ULL 10-7)

Fourth quarter

- FAU - D. Porter-Isom 27-yard TD pass from Embic, Kennard kick good, 14:49 (FAU 14-10)
- FAU - Thomas Parker 19-yard TD pass from Embic, Kennard kick good, 11:05 (FAU 21-10)
- FAU - Embick 3-yard TD run, Kennard kick good, 3:09 (FAU 28-10)

Top passers

- FAU - Danny Embick - 17/27, 276 yards, 3 TD
- ULL - Michael Desormeaux - 6/18, 47 yards, 2 INT

Top rushers

- FAU - Charles Pierre - 25 carries, 90 yards
- ULL - Michael Desormeaux - 11 carries, 83 yards

Top receivers

- FAU - Thomas Parker - 3 receptions, 88 yards, TD
- ULL - Bill Sampy - 2 receptions, 21 yards

=== @ Arkansas State ===
Louisiana-Lafayette at Arkansas State – Game summary

Quarter	1	2	3	4	Total
Ragin' Cajuns	7	9	13	7	36
Indians	0	7	7	25	39

at Indian Stadium, Jonesboro, AR

- Date: October 13
- Game time: 6:30 p.m. CST
- Game weather: 79 °F (26 °C); fair skies
- Game attendance: 12,944
- Referee: Rick Doan
- TV: ESPNU

Game information

First quarter

- ULL - Corey Fredrick 17-yard TD run, Sean Comiskey kick good, 8:41 (ULL 7-0)

Second quarter

- ULL - Abdule Levier 2-yard TD run, Brit Framel kick no good, 8:26 (ULL 13-0)
- ULL - Comiskey 29-yard field goal, 0:32 (ULL 16-0)
- ARST - Joe Smith 41-yard TD pass from Nick Noce, Eric Neilhouse, 0:02 (ULL 16-7)

Third quarter

- ULL - Michael Desormeaux 14-yard TD run, Framel kick good, 8:01 (ULL 22-7)
- ARST - Shermar Bracey 25-yard TD pass from Noce, Neilhouse kick good, 4:35 (ULL 22-14)
- ULL - Josh Harrison 3-yard TD run, Comiskey kick good, 0:03 (ULL 29-14)

Fourth quarter

- ARST - Bracey 3-yard TD run, Neilhouse kick good, 13:31 (ULL 29-21)
- ARST - Levi Dejohnette 55-yard TD pass from Noce, Manuel Burton two-point conversion pass good from Noce, 10:08 (TIE 29-29)
- ARST - Noce 15-yard TD run, Neilhouse kick good, 7:01 (ARST 36-29)
- ULL - Harrison 3-yard TD run, Comiskey kick good, 0:52 (TIE 36-36)
- ARST - Neilhouse 35-yard field goal, 0:00 (ARST 39-36)

Top passers

- ARST - Nick Noce - 10/20, 194 yards, 3 TD
- ULL - Michael Desormeaux - 10/16, 97 yards

Top rushers

- ARST - Shermar Bracey - 25 carries, 167 yards, TD
- ULL - Michael Desormeaux - 14 carries, 174 yards, TD

Top receivers

- ARST - Levi Dejohnette - 3 receptions, 67 yards, TD
- ULL - Bill Sampy - 4 receptions, 46 yards

=== @ Middle Tennessee ===
Louisiana-Lafayette at Middle Tennessee – Game summary

Quarter	1	2	3	4	Total
Ragin' Cajuns	0	7	0	6	13
Blue Raiders	10	0	0	0	10

at Johnny "Red" Floyd Stadium, Murfreesboro, TN

- Date: October 22
- Game time: 4:00 p.m. CST
- Game weather: 63 °F (17 °C); clear
- Game attendance: 17,044
- Referee: Jim Jackson

Game information

First quarter

- MTSU - Ralph King 3-yard TD run, Colby Smith kick good, 8:31 (MTSU 7-0)
- MTSU - Smith 37-yard field goal, 4:19 (MTSU 10-0)

Second quarter

- ULL - Josh Harrison 2-yard TD run, Sean Comiskey kick good, 13:14 (MTSU 10-7)

Fourth quarter

- ULL - Booker Jenkins 6-yard TD run, Comiskey kick no good, 1:04 (ULL 13-10)

Top passers

- ULL - Michael Desormeaux - 14/25, 138 yards
- MTSU - Clint Marks - 19/24, 218 yards

Top rushers

- ULL - Josh Harrison - 12 carries, 55 yards, TD
- MTSU - Eugene Gross - 15 carries, 54 yards

Top receivers

- ULL - Corey Fredrick - 4 receptions, 51 yards
- MTSU - Cleannord Saintil - 11 receptions, 141 yards

=== Troy ===
Troy at Louisiana-Lafayette – Game summary

Quarter	1	2	3	4	OT	Total
Trojans	0	0	7	21	0	28
Ragin' Cajuns	14	0	6	8	3	31

at Cajun Field, Lafayette, LA

- Date: October 29
- Game time: 4:00 p.m. CST
- Game weather: 73 °F (23 °C); clear
- Game attendance: 21,204
- Referee: Ken Williamson

Game information

First quarter

- ULL - Tyrell Fenroy 25-yard TD run, Sean Comiskey kick good, 11:29 (ULL 7-0)
- ULL - Michael Desormeaux 3-yard TD run, Comiskey kick good, 5:40 (ULL 14-0)

Third quarter

- ULL - Fenroy 4-yard TD run, Comiskey kick no good, 11:28 (ULL 20-0)
- TROY - Kenny Cattouse 12-yard TD run, Greg Whibbs kick good, 5:44 (ULL 20-7)

Fourth quarter

- TROY - Cattouse 3-yard TD run, Whibbs kick good, 13:52 (ULL 20-14)
- ULL - Fenroy 8-yard TD run, Kevin Robbins two-point conversion pass good from Desormeaux, 10:51 (ULL 28-14)
- TROY - Toris Rutledge 37-yard TD pass from Julian Foster, Whibbs kick good, 9:12 (ULL 28-21)
- TROY - Smokey Hampton 13-yard TD pass from Carl Meadows, Whibbs kick good, 0:22 (TIE 28-28)

First overtime

- ULL - Comiskey 40-yard field goal, (ULL 31-28)

Top passers

- ULL - Michael Desormeaux - 6/10, 86 yards
- TROY - Julian Foster - 7/19, 104 yards, TD, INT

Top rushers

- ULL - Tyrell Fenroy - 27 carries, 156 yards, 3 TD
- TROY - Kenny Cattouse - 20 carries, 89 yards, 2 TD

Top receivers

- ULL - Corey Fredrick - 4 receptions, 90 yards
- TROY - Smokey Hampton - 3 receptions, 46 yards, TD

=== @ North Texas ===
Louisiana-Lafayette at North Texas – Game summary

Quarter	1	2	3	4	Total
Ragin' Cajuns	7	14	0	10	31
Mean Green	0	7	14	7	28

at Fouts Field, Denton, TX

- Date: November 5
- Game time: 6:00 p.m. CST
- Game weather: 84 °F (29 °C); clear
- Game attendance: 14,153
- Referee: Marc Curles

Game information

First quarter

- ULL - Tyrell Fenroy 6-yard TD run, Sean Comiskey kick good, 10:56 (ULL 7-0)

Second quarter

- ULL - Jerry Babb 4-yard TD run, Comiskey kick good, 10:43 (ULL 14-0)
- UNT - Johnny Quinn 27-yard TD pass from Daniel Meager, Nick Balzaldua kick good, 6:56 (ULL 14-7)
- ULL - Fenroy 7-yard TD run, Comiskey kick good, 1:22 (ULL 21-7)

Third quarter

- UNT - Patrick Cobbs 59-yard TD run, Bazaldua kick good, 14:15 (ULL 21-14)
- UNT - Cobbs 8-yard TD run, Bazaldua kick good, 6:20 (TIE 21-21)

Fourth quarter

- ULL - Comiskey 22-yard field goal, 14:57 (ULL 24-21)
- UNT - Cobbs 9-yard TD run, Bazaldua kick good, 9:44 (UNT 28-21)
- ULL - Fenroy 1-yard TD run, Comiskey kick good, 1:10 (ULL 31-28)

Top passers

- ULL - Jerry Babb - 8/11, 109 yards, INT
- UNT - Daniel Meager - 8/14, 112 yards, TD, INT

Top rushers

- ULL - Jerry Babb - 22 carries, 133 yards, TD
- UNT - Patrick Cobbs - 23 carries, 197 yards, 3 TD

Top receivers

- ULL - Bill Sampy - 2 receptions, 59 yards
- UNT - Brandon Jackson - 4 receptions, 59 yards

=== Florida International ===
Florida International at Louisiana-Lafayette – Game summary

Quarter	1	2	3	4	Total
Golden Panthers	0	0	7	0	7
Ragin' Cajuns	7	7	7	7	28

at Cajun Field, Lafayette, LA

- Date: November 12
- Game time: 6:00 p.m. CST
- Game weather: 73 °F (23 °C); overcast
- Game attendance: 16,942
- Referee: Rick Doan

Game information

First quarter

- ULL - Jerry Babb 6-yard TD run, Sean Comiskey kick good, 10:08 (ULL 7-0)

Second quarter

- ULL - Michael Desormeaux 12-yard TD run, Comiskey kick good, 0:49 (ULL 14-0)

Third quarter

- ULL - Tyrell Fenroy 5-yard TD run, Comiskey kick good, 4:29 (ULL 21-0)
- FIU - Cory McKinney 23-yard TD pass from Josh Padrick, Adam Moss kick good, 1:49 (ULL 21-7)

Fourth quarter

- ULL - Derrick Smith 13-yard TD run, Comiskey kick good, 4:12 (ULL 28-7)

Top passers

- ULL - Michael Desormeaux - 5/7, 53 yards
- FIU - Josh Padrick - 18/34, 162 yards, TD

Top rushers

- ULL - Tyrell Fenroy - 27 carries, 147 yards, TD
- FIU - A'mod Ned - 15 carries, 73 yards

Top receivers

- ULL - Bill Sampy - 3 receptions, 36 yards
- FIU - Chandler Williams - 5 receptions, 54 yards

=== @ Louisiana-Monroe ===
Louisiana-Lafayette at Louisiana-Monroe – Game summary

Quarter	1	2	3	4	Total
Ragin' Cajuns	7	26	14	7	54
Indians	14	0	7	0	21

at Malone Stadium, Monroe, LA

- Date: November 26
- Game time: 2:30 p.m. CST
- Game weather: 73 °F (23 °C); cloudy
- Game attendance: 15,505
- Referee: Marc Curles

Game information

First quarter

- ULM - Drouzon Quillen 8-yard TD pass from Steven Jyles, Ragan Walters kick good, 9:10 (ULM 7-0)
- ULL - Kyle Ward 53-yard interception returned for TD, Sean Comiskey kick good, 6:09 (TIE 7-7)
- ULM - Jyles 2-yard TD run, Walters kick good, 1:10 (ULM 14-7)

Second quarter

- ULL - Tyrell Fenroy 16-yard TD run, Comiskey kick good, 13:42 (TIE 14-14)
- ULL - Team safety 10:16 (ULL 16-14)
- ULL - Fenroy 13-yard TD run, Comiskey kick good, 8:46 (ULL 23-14)
- ULL - Comiskey 24-yard field goal, 6:11 (ULL 26-14)
- ULL - Jerry Babb 4-yard TD run, Comiskey kick good, 0:45 (ULL 33-14)

Third quarter

- ULM - Calvin Dawson 11-yard TD run, Walters kick good, 13:57 (ULL 33-21)
- ULL - Fenroy 1-yard TD run, Comiskey kick good, 12:30 (ULL 40-21)
- ULL - Josh Harrison 1-yard TD run, Comiskey kick good, 2:15 (ULL 47-21)

Fourth quarter

- ULL - Booker Jenkins 1-yard TD run, Comiskey kick good, 13:22 (ULL 54-21)

Top passers

- ULL - Jerry Babb - 8/14, 82 yards
- ULM - Steven Jyles - 17/32, 136 yards, TD, INT

Top rushers

- ULL - Tyrell Fenroy - 20 carries, 164 yards, 3 TD
- ULM - Calvin Dawson - 10 carries, 43 yards, TD

Top receivers

- ULL - Kevin Robbins - 5 receptions, 49 yards
- ULM - Drouzon Quillen - 6 receptions, 50 yards, TD
