= 2005 Louisiana–Monroe Indians football team =

American college football season

2005 Louisiana–Monroe Indians football

Sun Belt co-champion
- Conference: Sun Belt Conference
- Record: 5–6 (5–2 Sun Belt)
- Head coach: Charlie Weatherbie (3rd season)
- Offensive coordinator: Todd Berry (2nd season)
- Defensive coordinator: Kim Dameron (1st season)
- Home stadium: Malone Stadium

2005 Sun Belt Conference football standings
	Conf.			Overall
Team	W		L	W		L
Arkansas State +	5	–	2	6	–	6
Louisiana–Lafayette +	5	–	2	6	–	5
Louisiana–Monroe +	5	–	2	5	–	6
Middle Tennessee	3	–	4	4	–	7
Troy	3	–	4	4	–	7
Florida Atlantic	2	–	5	2	–	9
North Texas	2	–	5	2	–	9
FIU†	0	–	4	0	–	6
+ – Conference co-champions; † – The NCAA vacated all 5 of FIU's (3–4, 5–6) wins

The 2005 Louisiana–Monroe Indians football team represented the University of Louisiana at Monroe in the 2005 NCAA Division I-A football season. The Indians offense scored 239 points while the defense allowed 339 points. It was the final season in which Louisiana–Monroe used the nickname of Indians. Louisiana–Monroe adopted its current nickname of Warhawks beginning with the 2006–07 school year.

== Schedule ==
Date	Time	Opponent	Site	TV	Result	Attendance
September 1	7:00 pm	Northwestern State*	Malone Stadium; Monroe, LA (rivalry)		L 23–27	21,726
September 10	2:00 pm	at Wyoming*	War Memorial Stadium; Laramie, WY		L 0–38	20,165
September 17	12:00 pm	at No. 6 Georgia*	Sanford Stadium; Athens, GA	CSS	L 7–44	92,746
September 22	2:00 pm	at Florida Atlantic	Lockhart Stadium; Fort Lauderdale, FL	ESPNU	W 28–21	11,426
October 1	6:00 pm	Arkansas State	Malone Stadium; Monroe, LA		W 31–27	14,929
October 8	6:00 pm	at Arkansas*	War Memorial Stadium; Little Rock, AR		L 15–44	54,209
October 15	2:30 pm	Troy	Malone Stadium; Monroe, LA	ESPN Plus	W 27–3	10,813
November 5	3:00 pm	FIU	Malone Stadium; Monroe, LA		L 29–31	10,111
November 12	2:00 pm	at Middle Tennessee	Johnny "Red" Floyd Stadium; Murfreesboro, TN		W 34–31	11,654
November 19	6:00 pm	at North Texas	Fouts Field; Denton, TX		W 24–19	19,632
November 26	2:30 pm	Louisiana–Lafayette	Malone Stadium; Monroe, LA (Battle on the Bayou)		L 21–54	15,505
*Non-conference game; Rankings from AP Poll released prior to the game; All times are in Central time
