= 2005 Middle Tennessee Blue Raiders football team =

American college football season

2005 Middle Tennessee Blue Raiders football
- Conference: Sun Belt Conference
- Record: 4–7 (3–4 Sun Belt)
- Head coach: Andy McCollum (7th season)
- Offensive coordinator: Darin Hinshaw (5th season)
- Defensive coordinator: Mark Criner (1st season)
- Home stadium: Johnny "Red" Floyd Stadium

2005 Sun Belt Conference football standings
	Conf.			Overall
Team	W		L	W		L
Arkansas State +	5	–	2	6	–	6
Louisiana–Lafayette +	5	–	2	6	–	5
Louisiana–Monroe +	5	–	2	5	–	6
Middle Tennessee	3	–	4	4	–	7
Troy	3	–	4	4	–	7
Florida Atlantic	2	–	5	2	–	9
North Texas	2	–	5	2	–	9
FIU†	0	–	4	0	–	6
+ – Conference co-champions; † – The NCAA vacated all 5 of FIU's (3–4, 5–6) wins

The 2005 Middle Tennessee Blue Raiders football team represented Middle Tennessee State University in the 2005 NCAA Division I FBS football season. Coming off a 5–6 season the year prior, the Blue Raiders finished with a 4–7 record and a 3–4 record in the Sun Belt Conference to tie for fourth in the conference standings. Following the season, fellow fourth-place FIU was sanctioned by the NCAA and forced to vacate their wins. Additionally, first-place Arkansas State was found guilty of NCAA violations and self-imposed punishments including the vacating of four of their six wins that season. Head coach Andy McCollum, as well as the offensive and defensive coordinators for the Blue Raiders, were fired following the conclusion of the 2005 season.

== Schedule ==
Date	Time	Opponent	Site	Result	Attendance
September 3	6:00 p.m.	at Alabama*	Bryant–Denny Stadium; Tuscaloosa, AL	L 6–27	81,018
September 10	6:00 p.m.	North Texas	Johnny "Red" Floyd Stadium; Murfreesboro, TN	L 7–14	20,806
September 17	4:00 p.m.	Akron*	Johnny "Red" Floyd Stadium; Murfreesboro, TN	L 7–17	12,411
October 1	6:00 p.m.	at Vanderbilt*	Vanderbilt Stadium; Nashville, TN	W 17–15	37,257
October 15	3:00 p.m.	at Florida Atlantic	FAU Stadium; Boca Raton, FL	W 35–14	10,117
October 22	4:00 p.m.	Louisiana–Lafayette	Johnny "Red" Floyd Stadium; Murfreesboro, TN	L 10–13	17,044
November 5	4:00 p.m.	Arkansas State	Johnny "Red" Floyd Stadium; Murfreesboro, TN	W 45–7	9,952
November 12	2:00 p.m.	Louisiana–Monroe	Johnny "Red" Floyd Stadium; Murfreesboro, TN	L 31–34	11,654
November 19	12:00 p.m.	at NC State*	Carter–Finley Stadium; Raleigh, NC	L 3–24	37,217
November 26	6:00 p.m.	at Troy	Veterans Memorial Stadium; Troy, AL (Battle for the Palladium)	W 17–7	17,005
December 3	6:00 p.m.	FIU	FIU Stadium; Miami, FL	L 31–35	16,730
*Non-conference game; All times are in Central time
