= 2005 FIU Golden Panthers football team =

American college football season

2005 FIU Golden Panthers football
- Conference: Sun Belt Conference
- Record: 0–6, 5 wins vacated (0–4 Sun Belt, 3 wins vacated)
- Head coach: Don Strock (4th season)
- Offensive coordinator: Greg Briner (4th season)
- Offensive scheme: Pro-style
- Defensive coordinator: Bernard Clark (2nd season)
- Base defense: 4–3
- Home stadium: FIU Stadium

2005 Sun Belt Conference football standings
	Conf.			Overall
Team	W		L	W		L
Arkansas State +	5	–	2	6	–	6
Louisiana–Lafayette +	5	–	2	6	–	5
Louisiana–Monroe +	5	–	2	5	–	6
Middle Tennessee	3	–	4	4	–	7
Troy	3	–	4	4	–	7
Florida Atlantic	2	–	5	2	–	9
North Texas	2	–	5	2	–	9
FIU†	0	–	4	0	–	6
+ – Conference co-champions; † – The NCAA vacated all 5 of FIU's (3–4, 5–6) wins

The 2005 FIU Golden Panthers football team represented Florida International University (FIU) as a member of the Sun Belt Conference during the 2005 NCAA Division I-A football season. Led by fourth-year head coach Don Strock, the Panthers compiled an overall record of 5–6 with a mark of 3–4 in conference play, placing in a three-way tie for third in the Sun Belt. The team played home game at FIU Stadium in Miami.

In 2008, the NCAA Division I Committee on Infractions found major violations within the FIU football program, and vacated the Panthers' five wins from the 2005 season, changing their official record to 0–6.

== Schedule ==
Date	Time	Opponent	Site	TV	Result	Attendance	Source
September 3	2:10 p.m.	at Kansas State*	KSU Stadium; Manhattan, KS		L 21–35	43,611	
September 10	7:00 p.m.	at No. 21 Texas Tech*	Jones SBC Stadium; Lubbock, TX		L 3–56	50,156	
September 24	3:30 p.m.	at Arkansas State	Indian Stadium; Jonesboro, AR	ESPN Plus	L 24–66	16,423	
October 1	6:00 p.m.	Florida A&M*	FIU Stadium; Miami, FL		W 23–6 (vacated)	16,512	
October 15	6:00 p.m.	North Texas	FIU Stadium; Miami, FL		L 10–13	14,433	
October 20	7:30 p.m.	at Troy	Movie Gallery Stadium; Troy, AL	ESPNU	L 13–18	18,232	
November 5	4:00 p.m.	at Louisiana–Monroe	Malone Stadium; Monroe, LA		W 31–29 (vacated)	10,111	
November 12	7:00 p.m.	at Louisiana–Lafayette	Cajun Field; Lafayette, LA		L 7–28	16,942	
November 19	6:10 p.m.	No. 23 (I-AA) Western Kentucky*^{†}	FIU Stadium; Miami, FL		W 38–35 (vacated)	13,388	
November 26	7:00 p.m.	Florida Atlantic	FIU Stadium; Miami, FL (Shula Bowl)		W 52–6 (vacated)	15,322	
December 3	7:00 p.m.	Middle Tennessee	FIU Stadium; Miami, FL		W 35–31 (vacated)	16,730	
*Non-conference game; ^{†}Homecoming; Rankings from AP Poll released prior to the game; All times are in Eastern time

== Game summaries ==
=== At Kansas State ===
	1	2	3	4	Total
Golden Panthers	0	7	14	0	21
Wildcats	6	7	15	7	35

=== At No. 21 Texas Tech ===
	1	2	3	4	Total
Golden Panthers	0	3	0	0	3
No. 21 Red Raiders	14	14	7	21	56
