= 2005 Troy Trojans football team =

American college football season

2005 Troy Trojans football
- Conference: Sun Belt Conference
- Record: 4–7 (3–4 Sun Belt)
- Head coach: Larry Blakeney (15th season)
- Offensive coordinator: Mark Fleetwood (3rd season)
- Offensive scheme: I formation
- Defensive coordinator: Ricky Logo (1st season)
- Home stadium: Movie Gallery Stadium

2005 Sun Belt Conference football standings
	Conf.			Overall
Team	W		L	W		L
Arkansas State +	5	–	2	6	–	6
Louisiana–Lafayette +	5	–	2	6	–	5
Louisiana–Monroe +	5	–	2	5	–	6
Middle Tennessee	3	–	4	4	–	7
Troy	3	–	4	4	–	7
Florida Atlantic	2	–	5	2	–	9
North Texas	2	–	5	2	–	9
FIU†	0	–	4	0	–	6
+ – Conference co-champions; † – The NCAA vacated all 5 of FIU's (3–4, 5–6) wins

The 2005 Troy Trojans football team represented Troy University as a member of the Sun Belt Conference during the 2005 NCAA Division I-A football season. Led by 15th-year head coach Larry Blakeney, the Trojans compiled an overall record of 4–7 with a mark of 3–4 in conference play, tying for fourth place in the Sun Belt. The team played home games at Movie Gallery Stadium in Troy, Alabama.

== Schedule ==
Date	Time	Opponent	Site	TV	Result	Attendance
September 3	6:00 p.m.	No. 17 (I-AA) Cal Poly*	Movie Gallery Stadium; Troy, AL		W 27–10	18,536
September 10	7:00 p.m.	UAB*	Movie Gallery Stadium; Troy, AL		L 7–27	22,299
September 17	1:00 p.m.	at Missouri*	Faurot Field; Columbia, MO		L 21-52	50,167
September 24	6:00 p.m.	at South Carolina*	Williams–Brice Stadium; Columbia, SC	PPV	L 20–45	79,125
October 4	6:30 p.m.	at North Texas	Fouts Field; Denton, TX	ESPN2	W 13–10	17,644
October 15	2:30 p.m.	at Louisiana–Monroe	Malone Stadium; Monroe, LA	ESPN Plus	L 3–27	10,813
October 20	6:30 p.m.	FIU^{†}	Movie Gallery Stadium; Troy, AL	ESPNU	W 18–13	18,232
October 29	4:00 p.m.	at Louisiana–Lafayette	Cajun Field; Lafayette, LA	CSS	L 28–31 ^{OT}	21,204
November 5	2:15 p.m.	Florida Atlantic	Movie Gallery Stadium; Troy, AL	CSS	W 28–14	21,053
November 12	6:00 p.m.	at Arkansas State	Indian Stadium; Jonesboro, AR		L 3–9	10,474
November 26	6:00 p.m.	Middle Tennessee	Movie Gallery Stadium; Troy, AL (Battle for the Palladium)	ESPN Plus	L 7–17	17,005
*Non-conference game; ^{†}Homecoming; Rankings from AP Poll released prior to the game; All times are in Central time
