= Shermar Bracey =

American gridiron football player (born 1982)

Profile
- Position: Running back

Personal information
- Born: July 1, 1982 (age 44); Chicago, Illinois, U.S.

Career information
- College: Arkansas State University

Career history
- 2006–2007: Saskatchewan Roughriders
- 2008: Edmonton Eskimos*
- * Offseason or practice squad member only

Shermar Bracey (born July 1, 1982) is an American former professional football running back who played for the Saskatchewan Roughriders of the Canadian Football League.

Bracey was signed as a free agent by Saskatchewan in 2006. He made his professional debut on August 19 versus the Hamilton Tiger-Cats, carrying the ball eight times for 50 yards in relief of starting running back Kenton Keith. Bracey ended the year with 38 carries for 233 yards and three touchdowns. He was released by the Riders on August 8, 2007 and re-signed on August 15, 2007. He was released again by the Riders on August 27, 2007.

In college, Bracey played for Arkansas State University.
