= 2005 North Texas Mean Green football team =

American college football season

2005 North Texas Mean Green football
- Conference: Sun Belt Conference
- Record: 2–9 (2–5 Sun Belt)
- Head coach: Darrell Dickey (8th season)
- Offensive coordinator: Ramon Flanigan (4th season)
- Offensive scheme: Pro spread
- Defensive coordinator: Kenny Evans (3rd season)
- Base defense: 4–2–5
- Home stadium: Fouts Field

2005 Sun Belt Conference football standings
	Conf.			Overall
Team	W		L	W		L
Arkansas State +	5	–	2	6	–	6
Louisiana–Lafayette +	5	–	2	6	–	5
Louisiana–Monroe +	5	–	2	5	–	6
Middle Tennessee	3	–	4	4	–	7
Troy	3	–	4	4	–	7
Florida Atlantic	2	–	5	2	–	9
North Texas	2	–	5	2	–	9
FIU†	0	–	4	0	–	6
+ – Conference co-champions; † – The NCAA vacated all 5 of FIU's (3–4, 5–6) wins

The 2005 North Texas Mean Green football team represented the University of North Texas as a member of the Sun Belt Conference during the 2005 NCAA Division I-A football season. Led by eighth-year head coach Darrell Dickey, the Mean Green compiled an overall record of 2–9 with a mark 2–5 in conference play, tying for sixth place in the Sun Belt. North Texas failed to win a Sun Belt title for the first time since joining the conference in 2001. A loss to Troy on the October 4 was the program first defeat in a conference game since October 6, 2001. The team played home games at the Fouts Field in Denton, Texas.

== Schedule ==
The team played two games that were rescheduled from their planned dates. The season opener was originally scheduled for September 3 against LSU, but due to aftereffects of Hurricane Katrina was moved to October 29. As a result, the Louisiana–Monroe game scheduled for that date was moved to November 19.

Date	Time	Opponent	Site	TV	Result	Attendance
September 10	6:00 p.m.	at Middle Tennessee	Johnny "Red" Floyd Stadium; Murfreesboro, TN		W 14–7	20,806
September 17	6:00 p.m.	Tulsa*	Fouts Field; Denton, TX		L 2–54	23,112
September 24	1:10 p.m.	at Kansas State*	KSU Stadium; Manhattan, KS		L 7–54	46,514
October 4	6:30 p.m.	Troy	Fouts Field; Denton, TX	ESPN2	L 10–13	17,644
October 15	5:00 p.m.	at FIU	FIU Stadium; Miami, FL		W 13–10	14,433
October 22	3:00 p.m.	at Louisiana Tech*	Joe Aillet Stadium; Ruston, LA		L 14–40	19,481
October 29	7:00 p.m.	at No. 7 LSU*	Tiger Stadium; Baton Rouge, LA	PPV	L 3–56	92,143
November 5	6:00 p.m.	Louisiana–Lafayette	Fouts Field; Denton, TX		L 28–31	14,153
November 12	2:00 p.m.	at Florida Atlantic	Dolphins Stadium; Miami Gardens, FL		L 23–26	7,939
November 19	6:00 p.m.	Louisiana–Monroe^{†}	Fouts Field; Denton, TX		L 19–24	19,632
November 26	1:00 p.m.	Arkansas State	Fouts Field; Denton, TX		L 24–31	7,691
*Non-conference game; ^{†}Homecoming; Rankings from AP Poll released prior to the game; All times are in Central time
