= Andy Phillips (kicker) =

American football player (born 1989)

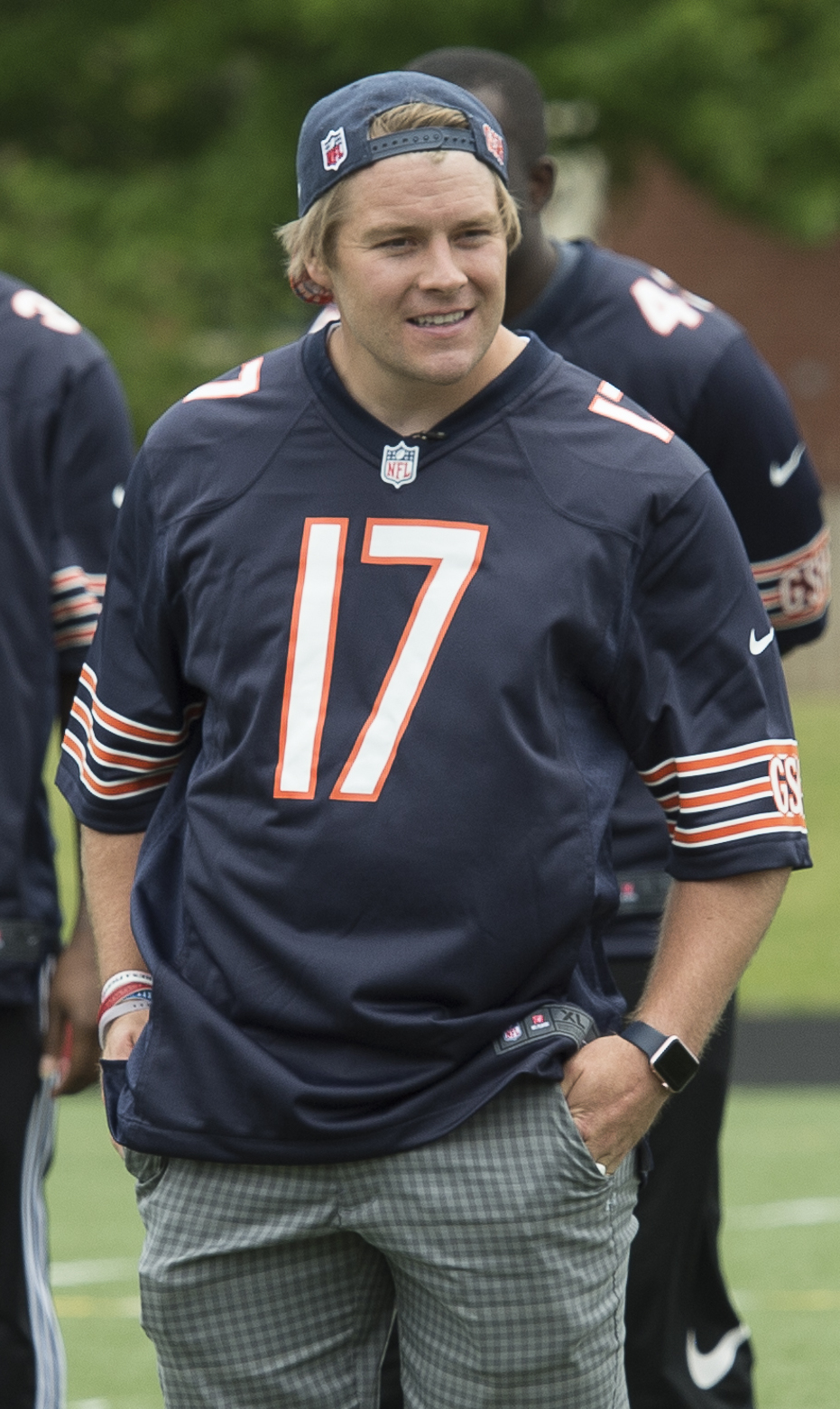
- Phillips with the Chicago Bears in 2017

Profile
- Position: Placekicker

Personal information
- Born: May 18, 1989 (age 37); Draper, Utah, U.S.
- Listed height: 5 ft 11 in (1.80 m)
- Listed weight: 205 lb (93 kg)

Career information
- High school: Winter Sports School (Park City, Utah)
- College: Utah
- NFL draft: 2017: undrafted

Career history
- Chicago Bears (2017)*
- * Offseason or practice squad member only

Awards and highlights
- Second-team All-American (2015); First-team All-Pac-12 (2015); Second-team All-Pac-12 (2016)

Andrew Dale Phillips (born May 18, 1989) is an American former college football played who was a placekicker for the Utah Utes. He earned second-team All-American honors in 2015.

== College career ==
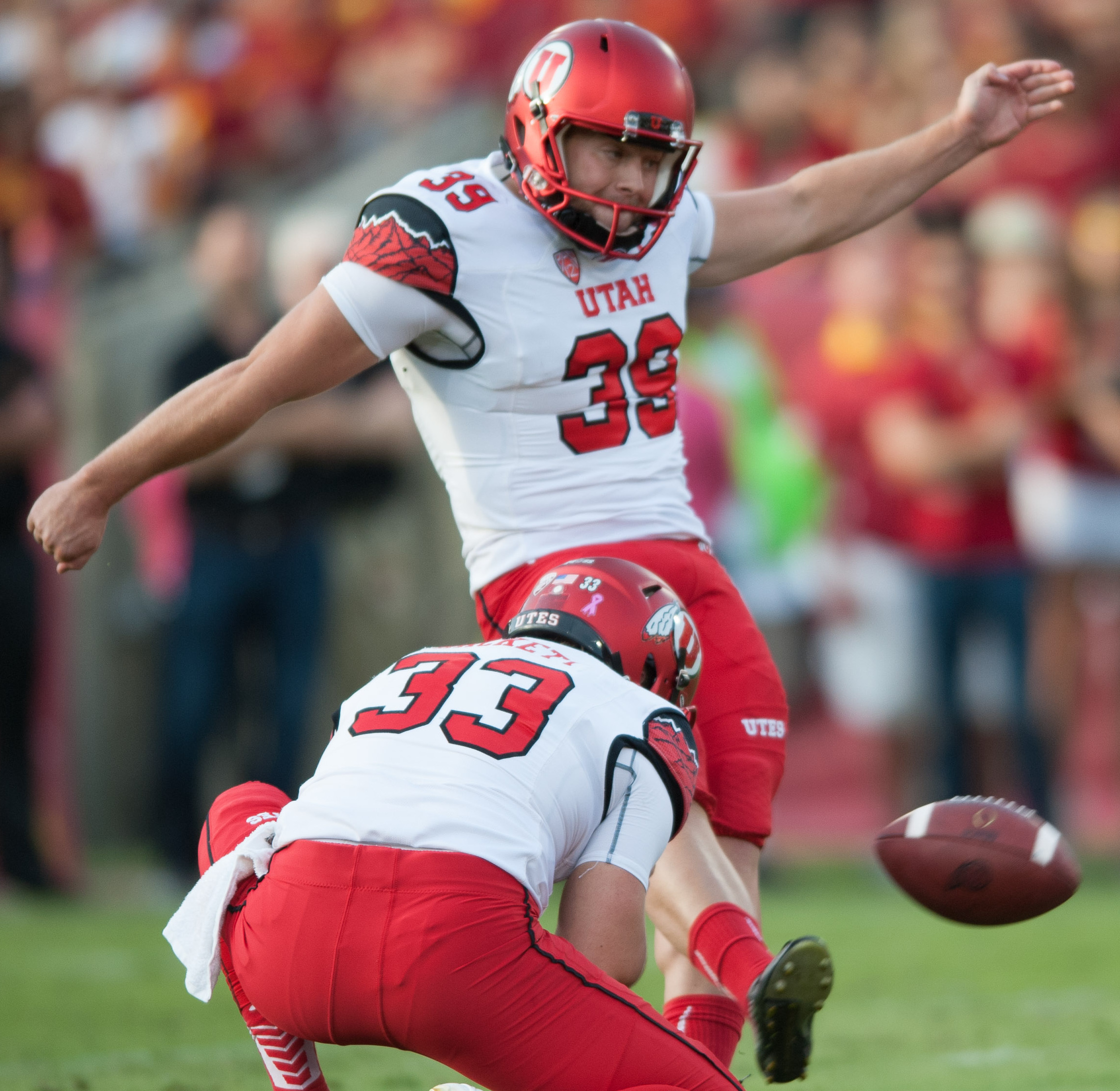
Phillips with Utah in 2015

After red-shirting the 2012 season, Phillips was the starting placekicker for Utah in 2013. On his college debut, Phillips went three for three on field goals and connected on all three extra points, as well as a recovered onside kick in a win over Utah State. He made his first eleven straight field goals in his first six games, the fourth longest streak in school history. He finished his freshman season with 17-20 (85%) field goals and connecting on all 41 extra points. He also executed two onside kicks.

In 2014, Phillips set school records in field goals made (23) and attempted (28). His 23 field goals led the Pac-12. He connected on twelve straight field goals, tied for third-best in school history. On October 6, 2014, Phillips kicked three field goals including the game-winner over No. 8 UCLA. He earned Lou Graza weekly honors. He finished with 23-28 (82.1%) on field goals and 44-45 (97.8%) on extra points. He was named first-team All-Pac-12.

In 2015. Phillips tied his own school record with 23 field goals, and connected on ten straight field goals to end the season. On November 14, 2015, Phillips kicked three field goals including an overtime 40-yarder in a double-overtime loss to Arizona. He finished the season going 23-27 (85.2) on field goals and making all 47 PATs. He was named a second-team All-American.

In his senior season, Phillips went 21-25 (84%) on field goals and kicking all 43 PATs. He scored 14 points including four field goals and the game-winner in a 26-24 Foster Farms Bowl victory over Indiana. He was named to the second-team All-Pac-12.

== Professional career ==
Phillips signed with the Chicago Bears as an undrafted free agent on May 11, 2017. On August 7, 2017, he was waived by the Bears.

== Personal life ==
Phillips lives in Salt Lake City, UT. He is an active member of the Church of Jesus Christ of Latter-day Saints. He was a US Ski Team member from 2007 to 2011. He has bachelor's degrees in Marketing and Information Systems and master's degree in Information Systems. He speaks Norwegian and German fluently.

Phillips continues to live an active lifestyle through coaching, skiing, and other sports. In partnership with KSL TV, Phillips filmed and released an online video series to aid parents in teaching children to ski. The video series is called "Learn to Ski with Max and Andy" and was released in January 2019. In April 2019, he competed in FitCon's Executive Fight Night, an amateur boxing event in which executives and athletes from around the state of Utah compete in a boxing match at FitCon. Phillips defeated Riley Nelson firmly by points. In 2018, Phillips and his siblings completed The Wonderland Trail in 3 days with no support. The Wonderland Trail circumnavigates Mt. Rainier in Washington State and is 93 miles long with over 25,000 ft in elevation gain and loss.
