= 2005 Arkansas State Indians football team =

American college football season

2005 Arkansas State Indians football

Sun Belt co-champion

New Orleans Bowl, L 19–31 vs. Southern Miss
- Conference: Sun Belt Conference
- Record: 2–6, 4 wins vacated (1–2 Sun Belt, 4 wins vacated)
- Head coach: Steve Roberts (4th season)
- Offensive coordinator: Doug Ruse (4th season)
- Co-defensive coordinators: Kevin Corless (4th season); Jack Curtis (4th season)
- Home stadium: Indian Stadium

2005 Sun Belt Conference football standings
	Conf.			Overall
Team	W		L	W		L
Arkansas State +	5	–	2	6	–	6
Louisiana–Lafayette +	5	–	2	6	–	5
Louisiana–Monroe +	5	–	2	5	–	6
Middle Tennessee	3	–	4	4	–	7
Troy	3	–	4	4	–	7
Florida Atlantic	2	–	5	2	–	9
North Texas	2	–	5	2	–	9
FIU†	0	–	4	0	–	6
+ – Conference co-champions; † – The NCAA vacated all 5 of FIU's (3–4, 5–6) wins

The 2005 Arkansas State Indians football team represented Arkansas State University as a member of the Sun Belt Conference the 2005 NCAA Division I-A football season. Led by fourth-year head coach Steve Roberts, the Indians finished the season with an overall record of 6–6 and a mark of 5–2 in conference play, sharing the Sun Belt title with Louisiana–Lafayette and Louisiana–Monroe. Arkansas State was invited to the New Orleans Bowl, where they lost to Southern Miss.

The 2005 vacated No Contest against Florida Atlantic was the first scoreless tie since The Oregon "Civil War" game of 1983, with both teams ending the game 0-0 in regulation. Florida Atlantic was intercepted and Arkansas State kicked a field goal in their overtime period to initially win the game (but was subsequently vacated).

A 31-month-long investigation by the NCAA discovered that 31 ineligible athletes in various sports were fielded in several different sports programs at Arkansas State. As a result, in 2011, four of the football team's wins from the 2005 season all six victories from the 2006 season were vacated as self-imposed penalties by Arkansas State.

== Schedule ==
Date	Time	Opponent	Site	TV	Result	Attendance
September 3	11:00 a.m.	vs. Missouri*	Arrowhead Stadium; Kansas City, MO		L 17–44	32,906
September 10	6:00 p.m.	Tennessee–Martin*	Indian Stadium; Jonesboro, AR		W 56–7	17,174
September 17	6:00 p.m.	at Oklahoma State*	Boone Pickens Stadium; Stillwater, OK		L 10–20	46,817
September 24	2:30 p.m.	FIU	Indian Stadium; Jonesboro, AR	ESPN Plus	W 66–24	16,423
October 1	6:00 p.m.	at Louisiana–Monroe	Malone Stadium; Monroe, LA		L 27–31	14,929
October 13	6:30 p.m.	Louisiana–Lafayette	Indian Stadium; Jonesboro, AR	ESPNU	W 39–36 (vacated)	12,944
October 22	6:00 p.m.	Florida Atlantic^{†}	Indian Stadium; Jonesboro, AR	Sun Sports/ESPNU	W 3–0 ^{OT} (vacated)	20,367
November 5	4:00 p.m.	at Middle Tennessee	Johnny "Red" Floyd Stadium; Murfreesboro, TN		L 7–45	9,952
November 12	6:00 p.m.	Troy	Indian Stadium; Jonesboro, AR		W 9–3 (vacated)	10,474
November 19	11:00 a.m.	at Army*	Michie Stadium; West Point, NY	ESPNU	L 10–38	25,692
November 26	1:00 p.m.	at North Texas	Fouts Field; Denton, TX		W 31–24 (vacated)	7,691
December 20	7:00 p.m.	vs. Southern Miss*	Cajun Field; Lafayette, LA (New Orleans Bowl)	ESPN	L 19–31	18,338
*Non-conference game; ^{†}Homecoming; All times are in Central time
