= 2005 Florida Atlantic Owls football team =

American college football season

2005 Florida Atlantic Owls football
- Conference: Sun Belt Conference
- Record: 2–9 (2–5 Sun Belt)
- Head coach: Howard Schnellenberger (5th season)
- Offensive coordinator: Gary Nord (1st season)
- Offensive scheme: Pro-style
- Defensive coordinator: Kirk Hoza (5th season)
- Base defense: 4–3
- Home stadium: Dolphins Stadium; Lockhart Stadium

2005 Sun Belt Conference football standings
	Conf.			Overall
Team	W		L	W		L
Arkansas State +	5	–	2	6	–	6
Louisiana–Lafayette +	5	–	2	6	–	5
Louisiana–Monroe +	5	–	2	5	–	6
Middle Tennessee	3	–	4	4	–	7
Troy	3	–	4	4	–	7
Florida Atlantic	2	–	5	2	–	9
North Texas	2	–	5	2	–	9
FIU†	0	–	4	0	–	6
+ – Conference co-champions; † – The NCAA vacated all 5 of FIU's (3–4, 5–6) wins

The 2005 Florida Atlantic Owls football team represented Florida Atlantic University (FAU) as a member of the Sun Belt Conference during the 2005 NCAA Division I-A football season. Led by fifth-year head coach Howard Schnellenberger, the Owls compiled an overall record of 2–9 with a mark of 2–5 in conference play, tying for sixth place in the Sun Belt. Florida Atlantic played home games at Dolphins Stadium in Miami Gardens, Florida and Lockhart Stadium in Fort Lauderdale, Florida.

This was the first season in which Florida Atlantic was a member of NCAA Division I-A—now known as the NCAA Division I Football Bowl Subdivision (FBS). The Owls competed at the NCAA Division I-AA—now known as the NCAA Division I Football Championship Subdivision (FCS)—level for the first four season's of the program's existence.

== Schedule ==
Date	Time	Opponent	Site	TV	Result	Attendance
September 3	3:00 p.m.	at Kansas*	Memorial Stadium; Lawrence, KS		L 19–30	40,930
September 8	7:00 p.m.	Oklahoma State*	Dolphins Stadium; Miami Gardens, FL	ESPN2	L 3–23	16,421
September 17	7:00 p.m.	at Minnesota*	Hubert H. Humphrey Metrodome; Minneapolis, MN	ESPN Plus	L 7–46	40,709
September 22	7:30 p.m.	Louisiana–Monroe	Lockhart Stadium; Fort Lauderdale, FL	ESPNU	L 21–28	11,426
October 1	12:00 p.m.	at No. 24 Louisville*	Papa John's Cardinal Stadium; Louisville, KY	ESPN Plus	L 10–61	40,219
October 6	8:00 p.m.	at Louisiana–Lafayette	Cajun Field; Lafayette, LA	ESPN Plus	W 28–10	14,208
October 15	3:00 p.m.	Middle Tennessee	Lockhart Stadium; Fort Lauderdale, FL		L 14–35	10,117
October 22	7:00 p.m.	at Arkansas State	Indian Stadium; Jonesboro, AR	ESPN Plus	L 0–3 ^{OT}	20,367
November 5	3:15 p.m.	at Troy	Movie Gallery Stadium; Troy, AL	PPV	L 14–28	21,053
November 12	3:00 p.m.	North Texas	Dolphins Stadium; Miami Gardens, FL		W 26–23	7,939
November 26	7:00 p.m.	at FIU	FIU Stadium; Miami, FL (Shula Bowl)		L 6–52	15,322
*Non-conference game; Rankings from AP Poll released prior to the game; All times are in Eastern time

== Roster ==
2005 Florida Atlantic Owls football team roster
Players
Coaches
Offense

Pos.	#	Name	Class
QB	5	Danny Embick	Sr
QB	11	Rusty Smith

Defense

Pos.	#	Name	Class

Special teams

Pos.	#	Name	Class

Head coach

- Howard Schnellenberger

Coordinators/assistant coaches

Legend

- (C) Team captain
- (S) Suspended
- (I) Ineligible
- Injured
- Redshirt

Roster

== Awards and honors ==
=== All-Sun Belt honors ===
- First Team All-Sun Belt Conference:
  - Shomari Earls (LB, Sr.)
  - Willie Hughley (CB, Sr.)
- Honorable Mention All-Sun Belt Conference:
  - Danny Embick (QB, Sr.)
  - Jarrid Smith (OL, So.)
