= 2005 Sun Belt Conference football season =

- League: NCAA Division I FBS (Football Bowl Subdivision)
- Sport: football
- Duration: August 28, 2005 through January 6, 2005
- Teams: 8
- TV partner: ESPN

Regular season
- Champion: Arkansas State; Louisiana-Lafayette; Louisiana-Monroe
- Season MVP: Steven Jyles

Football seasons
- 2004 2006

2005 Sun Belt Conference football standings
	Conf.			Overall
Team	W		L	W		L
Arkansas State +	5	–	2	6	–	6
Louisiana–Lafayette +	5	–	2	6	–	5
Louisiana–Monroe +	5	–	2	5	–	6
Middle Tennessee	3	–	4	4	–	7
Troy	3	–	4	4	–	7
Florida Atlantic	2	–	5	2	–	9
North Texas	2	–	5	2	–	9
FIU†	0	–	4	0	–	6
+ – Conference co-champions; † – The NCAA vacated all 5 of FIU's (3–4, 5–6) wins

The 2005 Sun Belt Conference football season was an NCAA football season that was played from August 28, 2005, to January 6, 2006. The Sun Belt Conference consisted of 8 football members: Arkansas State, Florida Atlantic, Florida International, Louisiana-Lafayette, Louisiana-Monroe, Middle Tennessee, North Texas, and Troy. Arkansas State, ULL, and ULM all shared the Sun Belt Championship.

== Players of the Year ==
2005 Sun Belt Player of the Year awards

Award	Player	School
Player of the Year	Steven Jyles	Louisiana-Monroe
Offensive Player of the Year	Steven Jyles	Louisiana-Monroe
Defensive Player of the Year	Jeff Littlejohn	Middle Tennessee
Newcomer of the Year	Aaron Weathers	North Texas
Freshman of the Year	Tyrell Fenroy	Louisiana-Lafayette
Coach of the Year	Steve Roberts	Arkansas State

== All-Conference Teams ==
Coaches All-Conference Selections

Position	Player	Team
First-team Offense
QB	Steven Jyles	UL Monroe
RB	Patrick Cobbs	North Texas
RB	Antonio Warren	Arkansas State
WR	Drouzon Quillen	UL Monroe
WR	Cleannord Saintil	Middle Tennessee
TE	Joey Trappey	UL Monroe
OL	Victor Cernius	FIU
OL	Brandon Cox	UL Lafayette
OL	Greg Hodges	UL Lafayette
OL	Tanner Jenkins	Arkansas State
OL	Dylan Lineberry	North Texas
First-team Defense
DL	Myron Anderson	Arkansas State
DL	Antwan Barnes	FIU
DL	Brandon Guillory	UL Monroe
DL	Jeff Littlejohn	Middle Tennessee
LB	Keyonvis Bouie	FIU
LB	Bernard Davis	Troy
LB	Shamari Earls	Florida Atlantic
DB	Johnny Faulk	Troy
DB	Willie Hughley	Florida Atlantic
DB	Tyrell Johnson	Arkansas State
DB	Chaz Williams	UL Monroe
First-team Special Teams
K	Eric Neihouse	Arkansas State
P	Joel Stelly	UL Monroe
RS	Leodis McKelvin	Troy
All-purpose	Michael Desormeaux	UL Lafayette

Position	Player	Team
Second-team Offense
QB	Josh Padrick	FIU
RB	Tyrell Fenroy	UL Lafayette
RB	Eugene Gross	Middle Tennessee
WR	Johnny Quinn	North Texas
WR	Chandler Williams	FIU
TE	Samuel Smith	FIU
OL	Kyle Cunningham	UL Monroe
OL	Willie Hall	Middle Tennessee
OL	Germayle Franklin	Middle Tennessee
OL	Matt Mandich	Arkansas State
OL	Jesse Newman	UL Lafayette
Second-team Defense
DL	Jeremiah Chapman	North Texas
DL	Torre Lankford	Troy
DL	Eugene Kwarteng	UL Lafayette
DL	Quinton Staton	Middle Tennessee
LB	Phillip Graves	North Texas
LB	J. K. Sabb	Middle Tennessee
LB	Devrett Wade	Arkansas State
DB	James Johnson	Arkansas State
DB	Kevin Payne	UL Monroe
DB	Nick Turnbull	FIU
DB	Aaron Weathers	North Texas
Second-team Special Teams
K	Adam Moss	FIU
P	Colby Smith	Middle Tennessee
RS	James Johnson	Arkansas State
All-purpose	Gary Banks	Troy
