= 2014 Louisiana–Lafayette Ragin' Cajuns football team =

American college football season

2014 Louisiana–Lafayette Ragin' Cajuns football

New Orleans Bowl champion

New Orleans Bowl, W 16–3 vs. Nevada
- Conference: Sun Belt Conference
- Record: 7–4, 2 wins vacated (5–1 Sun Belt, 2 wins vacated)
- Head coach: Mark Hudspeth (4th season)
- Offensive coordinator: Jay Johnson (4th season)
- Offensive scheme: Spread
- Defensive coordinator: James Willis (2nd season)
- Base defense: 4–3
- Home stadium: Cajun Field

2014 Sun Belt Conference football standings
	Conf.			Overall
Team	W		L	W		L
Georgia Southern * $	8	–	0	9	–	3
Louisiana–Lafayette ***	5	–	1	7	–	4
Appalachian State *	6	–	2	7	–	5
Texas State	5	–	3	7	–	5
Arkansas State	5	–	3	7	–	6
South Alabama	5	–	3	6	–	7
Louisiana–Monroe	3	–	5	4	–	8
Troy	3	–	5	3	–	9
New Mexico State	1	–	7	2	–	10
Idaho **	1	–	7	1	–	10
Georgia State	0	–	8	1	–	11
$ – Conference champion; * – Appalachian State and Georgia Southern ineligible for postseason play due to FCS-to-FBS transition rules ** – Idaho ineligible for postseason play due to APR penalties *** – Louisiana–Lafayette vacated 2 wins due to NCAA violations

The 2014 Louisiana–Lafayette Ragin' Cajuns football program represented the University of Louisiana at Lafayette in the 2014 NCAA Division I FBS football season. The team was led by fourth-year head coach Mark Hudspeth. The Ragin' Cajuns played their home games at Cajun Field and competed in the Sun Belt Conference. They finished the season 9–4 overall and 7–1 in Sun Belt play to finish in second place. They were invited to the New Orleans Bowl, for the fourth consecutive year, where they defeated Nevada. However, in 2015 Louisiana–Lafayette vacated two wins due to major NCAA violations.

== Preseason ==
=== Award watch lists ===
The following players were named to preseason award watch lists:

Davey O'Brien Award:

- Terrance Broadway

Lombardi Award:

- Mykhael Quave
- Daniel Quave
- Justin Hamilton
- Dominique Tovell

Biletnikoff Award:

- Jamal Robinson

=== Preseason All Conference Team ===
First Team Offense:

- QB Terrance Broadway
- RB Alonzo Harris
- RB Elijah McGuire
- WR Jamal Robinson
- OL Daniel Quave

First Team Defense:

- DL Justin Hamilton
- DL Dominique Tovell
- S Trevence Patt

Second Team Offense:

- OL Mykhael Quave

Second Team Defense:

- DL Christian Ringo

Offensive player of the year:

- QB Terrance Broadway

== Roster ==
2014 Louisiana-Lafayette Ragin' Cajuns football team roster
Players
Coaches
Offense

Pos.	#	Name	Class
WR	2	Al Riles	Jr
QB	3	Jordan Davis	Fr
WR	4	Jamal Robinson	Sr
QB	5	Jalen Nixon	So
QB	6	Dalvin Populist	Fr
WR	7	Jared Johnson	So
QB	8	Terrance Broadway	Sr
QB	9	Brooks Haack	So
TE	10	Larry Pettis	Sr
WR	11	James Butler	Sr
RB	15	Elijah McGuire	So
QB	16	Patrick Morton	Fr
WR	17	Lance Pace	So
WR	18	Devin Scott	So
WR	19	Lorenzo Cryer	Fr
WR	21	C.J. Bates	So
WR	22	Scott Austin	Fr
WR	23	Darius Hoggins	Fr
WR	24	Gabe Fuselier	Fr
RB	25	Torrey Pierce	Jr
RB	26	Effrem Reed	Jr
WR	31	Jerrell Richardson	So
TE	37	Matt Barnes	Fr
RB	39	Cardaye Spencer	Fr
RB	46	Alonzo Harris	Sr
OL	55	Karmichael Dunbar	So
OL	60	D'Aquin Withrow	Fr
OL	61	Grant Horst	Fr
OL	62	Jarad Martin	Sr
OL	63	Jeremy Sparks	So
OL	64	Nick Dugger	Fr
OL	65	Jesse Freeman	Fr
OL	67	Daniel Quave	Sr
OL	68	Octravian Anderson	Jr
OL	69	Greg Siener	Jr
OL	70	Mkyhael Quave	Jr
OL	71	Noah Marks	Fr
OL	72	Terry Johnson	Sr
OL	73	Ethan Rosenbalm	So
OL	74	Drew Moore	Fr
OL	75	Jonathan Lundy	Fr
OL	76	Adrian Goodacre	Fr
OL	77	Donovan Williams	Jr
OL	78	Allen Cummins	Fr
OL	79	Eddie Gordon	Jr
TE	81	Nick Byrne	So
WR	82	Christian Umphries	Fr
TE	84	Jacoby Beasly	Fr
TE	87	Jerrell Rogers	Fr
TE	88	Evan Tatford	Jr
TE	89	Anthony Jones	Fr

Defense

Pos.	#	Name	Class
CB	2	Simeon Thomas	So
DB	3	Montrel Carter	Jr
S	4	Trevence Patt	Sr
DB	5	Antoinne Adkins	Jr
DL	6	Justin Hamilton	Sr
CB	7	Corey Trim	Sr
DL	9	Christian Ringo	Sr
CB	11	Jevante Watson	Jr
DB	16	Travis Crawford	Fr
DB	19	Troy McCollum	So
CB	20	Dominick Jones	So
DB	21	Corey Turner	Fr
DB	22	Reggie Miles	Fr
S	23	Tracy Walker	Fr
CB	24	Sean Thomas	Sr
DB	25	Chris Collins	Fr
DB	26	Cole Bourque	Fr
S	27	T.J. Worthy	Jr
LB	28	Marcus Jackson	Sr
LB	29	Tyren Alexander	Jr
LB	30	T.J. Posey	Fr
S	33	Zachary DeGrange	Jr
DB	34	Ross Duhon	Fr
LB	35	Boris Anyama	Sr
LB	38	Trae Johnson	Sr
LB	39	Darzil Washington	Jr
LB	41	Taylor Schartle	Fr
LB	44	Kevin Fouquier	So
DL	47	Darrien Batiste	So
LB	50	Chaiziere Malbrue	Fr
LB	51	Trey Granier	So
DE	52	Dominique Tovell	Jr
DL	53	Marvin Martin	Sr
LB	56	Christian Sager	Sr
DE	57	Chris Prater	Jr
LB	58	Tre'Maine Lightfoot	So
LB	59	Jake Molbert	Sr
DT	90	Jacoby Briscoe	So
DL	92	Taboris Lee	Fr
DL	93	Marquis White	Jr
DL	94	Ken Edwards	Fr
DL	95	Rodrick Stephens	Fr
DL	97	Sherard Johnson	Fr
DL	98	Ladarrius Kidd	Fr
DL	99	Remaine Douglas	So

Special teams

Pos.	#	Name	Class
K	17	Dylan Scheurich	Fr
LS	40	Jake Guidry	Jr
K	45	Hunter Stover	Sr
P	48	Daniel Cadona	Sr
LS	49	Stephen Morella	So
K/P	86	Aaron Bird	Fr
K	91	Carlos Alvarez	Jr

Head coach

- Mark Hudspeth (Delta State)

Coordinators/assistant coaches

- Jay Johnson (Northern Iowa)
  Offensive coordinator
- Marquase Lovings (Howard)
  Assistant head coach
- Jorge Munoz (Bethany (KS))
  Assistant head coach
- Mitch Rodrigue (Nicholls State)
  Assistant head coach
- Reed Stringer (Delta State)
  Assistant head coach
- Rusty Whitt (Abilene Christian)
  Strength & conditioning coach
- Troy Wingerter (Louisiana)
  Director of football operations
- Ryan Trichel (Southeastern Louisiana)
  Director of player personnel

Legend

- (C) Team captain
- (S) Suspended
- (I) Ineligible
- Injured
- Redshirt

Roster
Last update: January 2, 2019

== Schedule ==
Date	Time	Opponent	Site	TV	Result	Attendance
August 30	6:00 pm	Southern*	Cajun Field; Lafayette, LA	ESPN3	W 45–6	36,170
September 6	6:00 pm	Louisiana Tech*	Cajun Field; Lafayette, LA	ESPN3	L 20–48	25,607
September 13	3:00 pm	at No. 14 Ole Miss*	Vaught–Hemingway Stadium; Oxford, MS	SECN	L 15–56	60,937
September 20	9:30 pm	at Boise State*	Albertsons Stadium; Boise, ID	CBSSN	L 9–34	33,337
October 4	6:00 pm	Georgia State	Cajun Field; Lafayette, LA	ESPN3	W 34–31	24,816
October 14	7:00 pm	at Texas State	Bobcat Stadium; San Marcos, TX	ESPN2	W 34–10	18,509
October 21	7:00 pm	Arkansas State	Cajun Field; Lafayette, LA	ESPN2	W 55–40	21,760
November 1	4:00 pm	South Alabama^{†}	Cajun Field; Lafayette, LA	ESPN3	W 19–9	25,861
November 8	7:00 pm	at New Mexico State	Aggie Memorial Stadium; Las Cruces, NM	ESPN3	W 44–16 (vacated)	10,299
November 15	6:00 pm	at Louisiana–Monroe	Malone Stadium; Monroe, LA (Battle on the Bayou)	ESPN3	W 34–27	19,544
November 22	4:00 pm	Appalachian State	Cajun Field; Lafayette, LA	ESPN3	L 16–35	20,638
November 29	11:30 am	at Troy	Veterans Memorial Stadium; Troy, AL	ESPN3	W 42–23 (vacated)	12,241
December 20	10:00 am	vs. Nevada*	Mercedes-Benz Superdome; New Orleans, LA (New Orleans Bowl)	ESPN	W 16–3	34,014
*Non-conference game; ^{†}Homecoming; Rankings from Coaches' Poll released prior to the game; All times are in Central time

== Game summaries ==
=== Southern ===
Southern at Louisiana-Lafayette – Game summary

Quarter	1	2	3	4	Total
Jaguars	0	0	6	0	6
Ragin' Cajuns	10	14	7	14	45

at Cajun Field, Lafayette, LA

- Date: August 30
- Game time: 6:00 p.m. CST
- Game weather: 74 °F (23 °C); light rain
- Game attendance: 36,170
- Referee: Tony Backert
- TV announcers (ESPN3): Matt Stewart (Play-by-play) & Cole Cubelic (Color)

Game information

First quarter

- ULL – Hunter Stover 31-yard field goal, 6:12 (ULL 3–0)
- ULL – Elijah McGuire 8-yard TD run, Stover kick good, 2:27 (ULL 10–0)

Second quarter

- ULL – Jamal Robinson 32-yard TD pass from Terrance Broadway, Stover kick good, 12:11 (ULL 17–0)
- ULL – Jared Johnson 13-yard TD pass from Broadway, Stover kick good, 7:35 (ULL 24–0)

Third quarter

- SOU – Bradley Coleman 23-yard TD pass from Austin Howard, Kyle Yonke kick no good, 8:54 (ULL 24–6)
- ULL – Robinson 7-yard TD pass from Broadway, Stover kick good, 4:37 (ULL 31–6)

Fourth quarter

- ULL – Broadway 8-yard TD run, Stover kick good, 13:52 (ULL 38–6)
- ULL – Larry Pettis 2-yard TD pass from Brooks Haack, 6:42 (ULL 45–6)

Top passers

- ULL – Terrance Broadway – 20/32, 237 yards, 3 TD, 2 INT
- SOU – Austin Howard – 18/31, 181 yards, TD

Top rushers

- ULL – Elijah McGuire – 13 carries, 129 yards, TD
- SOU – Tyre Bracken – 15 carries, 46 yards

Top receivers

- ULL – Jamal Robinson – 5 receptions, 112 yards, 2 TD
- SOU – Willie Quinn – 8 receptions, 105 yards

=== Louisiana Tech ===
Louisiana Tech at Louisiana-Lafayette – Game summary

Quarter	1	2	3	4	Total
Bulldogs	7	10	14	17	48
Ragin' Cajuns	0	7	0	13	20

at Cajun Field, Lafayette, LA

- Date: September 6
- Game time: 6:00 p.m. CST
- Game weather: 83 °F (28 °C); cloudy
- Game attendance: 25,607
- Referee: Rodney Burnette
- TV announcers (ESPN3): Dave Raymond (Play-by-play) & Jay Taylor (Color)

Game information

First quarter

- LT – Kenneth Dixon 99-yard TD run, Jonathan Barnes kick good, 4:25 (LT 7–0)

Second quarter

- ULL – Alonzo Harris 6-yard TD run, Hunter Stover kick good, 14:54 (TIE 7–7)
- LT – Hunter Lee 16-yard TD pass from Cody Sokol, Barnes kick good, 4:33 (LT 10–7)
- LT – Barnes 28-yard field goal, 0:10 (LT 13–7)

Third quarter

- LT – Sterling Griffin 78-yard TD pass from Sokol, Barnes kick good, 14:11 (LT 24–7)
- LT – Xavier Woods 46-yard interception return for TD, Barnes kick good, 3:45 (LT 31–7)

Fourth quarter

- LT – Dixon 32-yard TD run, Barnes kick good, 13:32 (LT 38–7)
- LT – Barnes 42-yard field goal, 11:03 (LT 41–7)
- ULL – Effrem Reed 20-yard TD pass from Terrance Broadway, Stover kick good, 9:34 (LT 41–14)
- LT – Jarred Craft 2-yard TD run, Barnes kick good, 4:56 (LT 48–14)
- ULL – Gabe Fuselier 4-yard TD pass from Brooks Haack, 0:00 (LT 48–20)

Top passers

- LT – Cody Sokol – 22/33, 295 yards, 2 TD
- ULL – Terrance Broadway – 19/31, 150 yards, TD, INT

Top rushers

- LT – Kenneth Dixon – 12 carries, 184 yards, 2 TD
- ULL – Terrance Broadway – 13 carries, 82 yards

Top receivers

- LT – Sterling Griffin – 3 receptions, 88 yards, TD
- ULL – Gabe Fuselier – 6 receptions, 52 yards, TD

=== Ole Miss ===
Louisiana-Lafayette at Ole Miss – Game summary

Quarter	1	2	3	4	Total
Ragin' Cajuns	0	6	7	2	15
Rebels	14	14	21	7	56

at Vaught-Hemingway Stadium, Oxford, MS

- Date: September 13
- Game time: 3:00 p.m. CST
- Game weather: 69 °F (21 °C); overcast
- Game attendance: 60,937
- Referee: Tim Ritter
- TV announcers (SECN): Tom Hart (Play-by-play), Matt Stinchcomb (Color), & Heather Mitts (Sideline)

Game information

First quarter

- MISS – I'Tavius Mathers 56-yard TD run, Andrew Fletcher kick good, 10:00 (MISS 7–0)
- MISS – Jaylen Walton 40-yard TD pass from Bo Wallace, Fletcher kick good, 3:45 (MISS 14–0)

Second quarter

- MISS – Vince Sanders 14-yard TD pass from Wallace, Fletcher kick good, 12:37 (MISS 21–0)
- MISS – Sanders 24-yard TD pass from Wallace, Fletcher kick good, 7:08 (MISS 28–0)
- ULL – Hunter Stover 32-yard field goal, 1:55 (MISS 28–3)
- ULL – Stover 20-yard field goal, 0:09 (MISS 28–6)

Third quarter

- MISS – Cody Core 13-yard TD pass from Wallace, Fletcher kick good, 10:30 (MISS 35–6)
- MISS – Senquez Golson 59-yard interception return for TD, Fletcher kick good, 9:11 (MISS 42–6)
- MISS – Walton 71-yard TD run, Fletcher kick good, 7:48 (MISS 49–6)
- ULL – Alonzo Harris 8-yard TD run, Stover kick good, 1:04 (MISS 49–13)

Fourth quarter

- MISS – Jeremy Liggins 2-yard TD run, Fletcher kick good, 5:16 (MISS 56–13)
- ULL – Team Safety, 2:25 (MISS 56–15)

Top passers

- MISS – Bo Wallace – 23/28, 316 yards, 4 TD, INT
- ULL – Terrance Broadway – 15/30, 129 yards, 3 INT

Top rushers

- MISS – Jaylen Walton – 7 carries, 89 yards, TD
- ULL – Elijah McGuire – 10 carries, 66 yards

Top receivers

- MISS – Vince Sanders – 8 receptions, 125 yards, 2 TD
- ULL – James Butler – 5 receptions, 33 yards

=== Boise State ===
Louisiana-Lafayette at Boise State – Game summary

Quarter	1	2	3	4	Total
Ragin' Cajuns	3	0	0	6	9
Broncos	14	7	10	3	34

at Albertsons Stadium, Boise, ID

- Date: September 20
- Game time: 9:30 p.m. CST
- Game weather: 78 °F (26 °C); fair
- Game attendance: 33,337
- Referee: Jeff Hilyer
- TV announcers (CBSSN): Carter Blackburn (Play-by-play), Aaron Taylor (Color), & Jamie Erdahl (Sideline)

Game information

First quarter

- BSU – Jay Ajayi 2-yard TD run, Dan Goodale kick good, 8:37 (BSU 7–0)
- BSU – Ajayi 2-yard TD run, Goodale kick good, 6:21 (BSU 14–0)
- ULL – Hunter Stover 22-yard field goal, 2:01 (BSU 14–3)

Second quarter

- BSU – Ajayi 16-yard TD run, Goodale kick good, 12:04 (BSU 21–3)

Third quarter

- BSU – Goodale 40-yard field goal, 10:58 (BSU 24–3)
- BSU – Devan Demas 5-yard TD run, Goodale kick good, 6:39 (BSU 31–3)

Fourth quarter

- ULL – Elijah McGuire 7-yard TD run, Stover kick no good, 11:56 (BSU 31–9)
- BSU – Goodale 33-yard field goal, 1:27 (BSU 34–9)

Top passers

- BSU – Grant Hendrick – 24/31, 237 yards
- ULL – Terrance Broadway – 20/38, 160 yards, INT

Top rushers

- BSU – Jay Ajayi – 27 carries, 150 yards, 3 TD
- ULL – Elijah McGuire – 7 carries, 31 yards, TD

Top receivers

- BSU – Matt Miller – 5 receptions, 107 yards
- ULL – Elijah McGuire – 10 receptions, 106 yards

=== Georgia State ===
Georgia State at Louisiana-Lafayette – Game summary

Quarter	1	2	3	4	Total
Panthers	7	10	7	7	31
Ragin' Cajuns	7	7	7	13	34

at Cajun Field, Lafayette, LA

- Date: October 4
- Game time: 6:00 p.m. CST
- Game weather: 72 °F (22 °C); clear
- Game attendance: 24,616
- Referee: Perry Havener
- TV announcers (ESPN3): Drew Fellios (Play-by-play) & Forrest Conoly (Color)

Game information

First quarter

- ULL – Elijah McGuire 54-yard TD run, Hunter Stover kick good, 8:57 (ULL 7–0)
- GAST – Duvall Smith 1-yard TD run, Wil Lutz kick good, 2:19 (TIE 7–7)

Second quarter

- GAST – Marcus Caffey 12-yard TD run, Lutz kick good, 5:08 (GAST 14–7)
- ULL – Jamal Robinson 19-yard TD pass from Terrance Broadway, 1:13 (TIE 14–14)
- GAST – Lutz 48-yard field goal, 0:00 (GAST 17–14)

Third quarter

- ULL – Alonzo Harris 1-yard TD run, Stover kick good, 9:43 (ULL 21–17)
- GAST – Caffey 1-yard TD run, Lutz kick good, 2:03 (GAST 24–21)

Fourth quarter

- ULL – Harris 1-yard TD run, Stover kick good, 11:13 (ULL 28–24)
- GAST – Caffey 2-yard TD run, Lutz kick good, 6:35 (GAST 31–28)
- ULL – Robinson 21-yard TD pass from Broadway, Stover kick no good, 3:34 (ULL 34–31)

Top passers

- ULL – Terrance Broadway – 20/26, 216 yards, 2 TD
- GAST – Nick Arbuckle – 19/27, 276 yards

Top rushers

- ULL – Elijah McGuire – 6 carries, 90 yards, TD
- GAST – Marcus Caffey – 27 carries, 90 yards, 3 TD

Top receivers

- ULL – Jamal Robinson – 8 receptions, 119 yards, 2 TD
- GAST – Donovan Harden – 4 receptions, 91 yards

=== Texas State ===
Louisiana-Lafayette at Texas State – Game summary

Quarter	1	2	3	4	Total
Ragin' Cajuns	7	14	7	6	34
Bobcats	0	3	0	7	10

at Bobcat Stadium, San Marcos, TX

- Date: October 14
- Game time: 7:00 p.m. CST
- Game weather: 69 °F (21 °C); sunny
- Game attendance: 18,509
- Referee: Tony Backert
- TV announcers (ESPN2): Kevin Dunn (Play-by-play), Ahmad Brooks (Color), & Sean Adams (Sideline)

Game information

First quarter

- ULL – Elijah McGuire 62-yard TD pass from Terrance Broadway, Hunter Stover kick good, 14:16 (ULL 7–0)

Second quarter

- TXST – Will Johnson 20-yard field goal, 14:22 (ULL 7–3)
- ULL – Christian Ringo 41-yard fumble return for TD, 9:07 (ULL 14–3)
- ULL – Alonzo Harris 1-yard TD run, Stover kick good, 5:59 (ULL 21–3)

Third quarter

- ULL – McGuire 13-yard TD run, Stover kick good, 9:29 (ULL 28–3)

Fourth quarter

- ULL – Stover 19-yard field goal, 10:18 (ULL 31–3)
- ULL – Stover 32-yard field goal, 2:04 (ULL 34–3)
- TXST – Brice Gunter 33-yard TD pass from Tyler Jones, Johnson kick good, 1:04 (ULL 34–10)

Top passers

- ULL – Terrance Broadway – 14/21, 225 yards, TD, INT
- TXST – Tyler Jones – 14/23, 176 yards, TD, INT

Top rushers

- ULL – Terrance Broadway – 19 carries, 101 yards
- TXST – Robert Lowe – 8 carries, 36 yards

Top receivers

- ULL – Elijah McGuire – 4 receptions, 85 yards, TD
- TXST – Brice Gunter – 2 receptions, 50 yards, TD

=== Arkansas State ===
Arkansas State at Louisiana-Lafayette – Game summary

Quarter	1	2	3	4	Total
Red Wolves	9	14	0	17	40
Ragin' Cajuns	13	21	7	14	55

at Cajun Field, Lafayette, LA

- Date: October 21
- Game time: 7:00 p.m. CST
- Game weather: 78 °F (26 °C); clear
- Game attendance: 21,760
- Referee: Perry Havener
- TV announcers (ESPN2): Mike Couzens (Play-by-play), Ray Bentley (Color), & Laura Rutledge (Sideline)

Game information

First quarter

- ARST – Fredi Knighten 60-yard TD run, Luke Ferguson kick no good, 11:42 (ARST 6–0)
- ULL – Alonzo Harris 4-yard TD run, Hunter Stover kick blocked, 7:45 (TIE 6–6)
- ARST – Ferguson 44-yard field goal, 4:58 (ARST 9–6)
- ULL – Harris 22-yard TD run, Stover kick good, 1:20 (ULL 13–6)

Second quarter

- ULL – Harris 1-yard TD run, Stover kick good, 14:16 (ULL 20–9)
- ULL – Elijah McGuire 74-yard TD run, Stover kick good, 11:19 (ULL 27–9)
- ULL – McGuire 13-yard TD run, Stover kick good, 8:49 (ULL 34–9)
- ARST – Michael Gordon 70-yard TD run, Ferguson kick good, 7:52 (ULL 34–16)
- ARST – Dijon Paschal 87-yard TD pass from Knighten, Ferguson kick good, 4:29 (ULL 34–23)

Third quarter

- ULL – Harris 4-yard TD run, Stover kick good, 6:14 (ULL 41–23)

Fourth quarter

- ARST – Ferguson 29-yard field goal, 10:10 (ULL 41–26)
- ARST – Paschal 6-yard TD pass from Knighten, Two-point conversion pass no good, 5:37 (ULL 41–32)
- ULL – McGuire 43-yard TD run, Stover kick good, 3:30 (ULL 48–32)
- ARST – Tres Houston 12-yard TD pass from Knighten, Knighten two-point conversion pass to Warren Leapheart good, 1:12 (ULL 48–40)
- ULL – McGuire 54-yard TD run, Stover kick good, 0:54 (ULL 55–40)

Top passers

- ULL – Terrance Broadway – 9/17, 102 yards
- ARST – Fredi Knighten – 26/37, 344 yards, 3 TD, INT

Top rushers

- ULL – Elijah McGuire – 19 carries, 265 yards, 4 TD
- ARST – Michael Gordon – 15 carries, 134 yards, TD

Top receivers

- ULL – James Butler – reception, 34 yards
- ARST – Dijon Paschal – 8 receptions, 141 yards, 2 TD

=== South Alabama ===
South Alabama at Louisiana-Lafayette – Game summary

Quarter	1	2	3	4	Total
Jaguars	0	9	0	0	9
Ragin' Cajuns	3	3	3	10	19

at Cajun Field, Lafayette, LA

- Date: November 1
- Game time: 4:00 p.m. CST
- Game weather: 61 °F (16 °C); clear
- Game attendance: 25,861
- Referee: Charles Lewis
- TV announcers (ESPN3): Matt Stewart (Play-by-play), Rocky Boiman (Color), & Brooke Williamson (Sideline)

Game information

First quarter

- ULL – Hunter Stover 23-yard field goal, 9:19 (ULL 3–0)

Second quarter

- USA – Aleem Sunanon 20-yard field goal, 14:47 (TIE 3–3)
- USA – Jereme Jones 12-yard TD pass from Brandon Bridge, Sunanon kick no good, 8:15 (USA 9–3)
- ULL – Stover 26-yard field goal, 4:30 (USA 9–6)

Third quarter

- ULL – Stover 22-yard field goal, 3:31 (TIE 9–9)

Fourth quarter

- ULL – Stover 32-yard field goal, 11:28 (ULL 12–9)
- ULL – Elijah McGuire 8-yard TD run, Stover kick good, 5:01 (ULL 19–9)

Top passers

- ULL – Terrance Broadway – 16/28, 221 yards
- USA – Brandon Bridge – 16/27, 177 yards, TD

Top rushers

- ULL – Elijah McGuire – 18 carries, 116 yards, TD
- USA – Xavier Johnson – 10 carries, 43 yards

Top receivers

- ULL – James Butler – 4 receptions, 91 yards
- USA – Shavarez Smith – 8 receptions, 116 yards

=== New Mexico State ===
Louisiana-Lafayette at New Mexico State – Game summary

Quarter	1	2	3	4	Total
Ragin' Cajuns	7	14	9	14	44
Aggies	3	0	6	7	16

at Aggie Memorial Stadium, Las Cruces, NM

- Date: November 8
- Game time: 7:00 p.m. CST
- Game weather: 67 °F (19 °C); mostly clear
- Game attendance: 10,299
- Referee: Kevin Stine
- TV announcers (ESPN3): Glen Cerny (Play-by-play) & Danny Knee (Color)

Game information

First quarter

- NMSU – Maxwell Johnson 22-yard field goal, 9:34 (NMSU 3–0)
- ULL – Jared Johnson 5-yard TD pass from Terrance Broadway, Hunter Stover kick good, 2:26 (ULL 7–3)

Second quarter

- ULL – Elijah McGuire 7-yard TD run, Stover kick good, 9:09 (ULL 14–3)
- ULL – Effrem Reed 2-yard TD run, Stover kick good, 0:44 (ULL 21–3)

Third quarter

- ULL – McGuire 4-yard TD pass from Broadway, Stover kick good, 11:23 (ULL 28–3)
- NMSU – Teldrick Morgan 42-yard TD pass from Tyler Rogers, Johnson kick blocked, 9:15 (ULL 28–9)
- ULL – Corey Trim Defensive two-point conversion, 9:15 (ULL 30–9)

Fourth quarter

- ULL – Johnson 9-yard TD pass from Broadway, Stover kick good, 14:16 (ULL 37–9)
- ULL – Darius Hoggins 3-yard TD run, Stover kick good, 10:26 (ULL 44–9)
- NMSU – Xavier Hall 5-yard TD run, Johnson kick good, 2:09 (ULL 44–16)

Top passers

- ULL – Terrance Broadway – 12/23, 158 yards, 3 TD
- NMSU – Tyler Rogers – 19/34, 204 yards, TD, 3 INT

Top rushers

- ULL – Elijah McGuire – 26 carries, 136 yards, TD
- NMSU – Xavier Hall – 19 carries, 47 yards, TD

Top receivers

- ULL – James Butler – 5 receptions, 95 yards
- NMSU – Teldrick Morgan – 8 receptions, 117 yards, TD

=== Louisiana-Monroe ===
Louisiana-Lafayette at Louisiana-Monroe – Game summary

Quarter	1	2	3	4	Total
Ragin' Cajuns	17	3	0	14	34
Warhawks	7	6	0	14	27

at Malone Stadium, Monroe, LA

- Date: November 15
- Game time: 6:00 p.m. CST
- Game weather: 46 °F (8 °C); cloudy
- Game attendance: 19,544
- Referee: Jeff Hilyer
- TV announcers (ESPN3): Matt Stewart (Play-by-play), Rocky Boiman (Color), & Danielle Jenkins (Sideline)

Game information

First quarter

- ULL – Hunter Stover 22-yard field goal, 10:59 (ULL 3–0)
- ULL – Elijah McGuire 1-yard TD run, Stover kick good, 7:03 (ULL 10–0)
- ULM – Kenzee Jackson 5-yard TD pass from Pete Thomas, Justin Manton kick good, 2:24 (ULL 10–7)
- ULL – Al Riles 16-yard TD pass from Terrance Broadway, Stover kick good, 0:42 (ULL 17–7)

Second quarter

- ULM – Manton 34-yard field goal, 12:38 (ULL 17–10)
- ULL – Stover 38-yard field goal, 6:51 (ULL 20–10)
- ULM – Manton 47-yard field goal, 0:00 (ULL 20–13)

Fourth quarter

- ULL – Broadway 12-yard TD run, Stover kick good, 11:00 (ULL 27–13)
- ULM – Thomas 2-yard TD run, Manton kick good, 6:46 (ULL 27–20)
- ULL – Gabe Fuselier 36-yard TD pass from Broadway, Stover kick good, 2:53 (ULL 34–20)
- ULM – Rashon Ceaser 45-yard TD pass from Thomas, Manton kick good, 1:47 (ULL 34–27)

Top passers

- ULL – Terrance Broadway – 10/13, 173 yards, 2 TD, INT
- ULM – Pete Thomas – 38/54, 472 yards, 2 TD

Top rushers

- ULL – Alonzo Harris – 13 carries, 133 yards
- ULM – Centarius Donald – 7 carries, yard

Top receivers

- ULL – James Butler – 4 receptions, 61 yards
- ULM – Rashon Ceaser – 11 receptions, 120 yards, TD

=== Appalachian State ===
Appalachian State at Louisiana-Lafayette – Game summary

Quarter	1	2	3	4	Total
Mountaineers	14	0	7	14	35
Ragin' Cajuns	3	10	3	0	16

at Cajun Field, Lafayette, LA

- Date: November 22
- Game time: 1:00 p.m. CST
- Game weather: 71 °F (22 °C); partly cloudy
- Game attendance: 20,638
- Referee: Tony Backert
- TV announcers (ESPN3): Matt Stewart (Play-by-play) & Forrest Conoly (Color)

Game information

First quarter

- ULL – Hunter Stover 38-yard field goal, 7:05 (ULL 3–0)
- APST – Marcus Cox 8-yard TD run, Bentlee Critcher kick good, 1:45 (APST 7–3)
- APST – Bobo Beathard 33-yard punt return for TD, Critcher kick good, 0:20 (APST 14–3)

Second quarter

- ULL – Elijah McGuire 8-yard TD run, Stover kick good, 7:46 (APST 14–10)
- ULL – Stover 26-yard field goal, 0:00 (APST 14–13)

Third quarter

- APST – Montez McGuire 40-yard TD pass from Taylor Lamb, Critcher kick good, 5:39 (APST 21–13)
- ULL – Stover 33-yard field goal, 0:20 (APST 21–16)

Fourth quarter

- APST – Cox 2-yard TD run, Critcher kick good, 5:35 (APST 28–16)
- APST – Terrence Upshaw 36-yard TD run, Critcher kick good, 2:26 (APST 35–16)

Top passers

- APST – Taylor Lamb – 11/22, 195 yards, TD, INT
- ULL – Terrance Broadway – 21/33, 160 yards

Top rushers

- APST – Marcus Cox – 36 carries, 151 yards, 2 TD
- ULL – Alonzo Harris – 13 carries, 60 yards

Top receivers

- APST – Montez McGuire – 2 receptions, 52 yards, TD
- ULL – Elijah McGuire – 5 receptions, 35 yards

=== Troy ===
Louisiana-Lafayette at Troy – Game summary

Quarter	1	2	3	4	Total
Ragin' Cajuns	7	14	14	7	42
Trojans	2	21	0	0	23

at Veteran Memorial Stadium, Troy, AL

- Date: November 29
- Game time: 11:30 a.m. CST
- Game weather: 58 °F (14 °C); sunny
- Game attendance: 12,241
- Referee: Charles Lewis
- TV announcers (ESPN3): Darren Goldwater (Play-by-play) & Peter Vaas (Color)

Game information

First quarter

- ULL – Elijah McGuire 8-yard TD run, Hunter Stover kick good, 8:01 (ULL 7–0)
- TROY – Team Safety, 0:50 (ULL 7–2)

Second quarter

- TROY – Bryan Homes 28-yard TD pass from Brandon Silvers, Ryan Kay kick good, 13:56 (TROY 9–7)
- ULL – Alonzo Harris 2-yard TD run, Stover kick good, 5:34 (ULL 14–9)
- TROY – Teddy Ruben 17-yard TD pass from Silvers, Kay kick good, 2:59 (TROY 16–14)
- ULL – McGuire 75-yard TD run, Stover kick good, 2:49 (ULL 21–16)
- TROY – B.J. Chitty 5-yard TD pass from Silvers, Kay kick good, 1:01 (TROY 23–21)

Third quarter

- ULL – Harris 1-yard TD run, Stover kick good, 10:00 (ULL 28–23)
- ULL – Terrance Broadway 9-yard TD run, Stover kick good, 0:33 (ULL 35–23)

Fourth quarter

- ULL – Harris 1-yard TD run, Stover kick good, 3:48 (ULL 42–23)

Top passers

- ULL – Terrance Broadway – 14/19, 142 yards
- TROY – Brandon Silvers – 29/34, 272 yards, 3 TD

Top rushers

- ULL – Elijah McGuire – 14 carries, 169 yards, 2 TD
- TROY – Brandon Burks – 6 carries, 50 yards

Top receivers

- ULL – Gabe Fuselier – 5 receptions, 44 yards
- TROY – Chandler Worthy – 8 receptions, 72 yards

=== Nevada (New Orleans Bowl) ===
Nevada vs. Louisiana-Lafayette – Game summary

Quarter	1	2	3	4	Total
Wolf Pack	0	3	0	0	3
Ragin' Cajuns	10	0	0	6	16

at Mercedes-Benz Superdome, New Orleans, LA

- Date: December 20
- Game time: 10:00 a.m. CST
- Game weather: 51 °F (11 °C); N/A (indoors)
- Game attendance: 34,014
- Referee: Greg Blum
- TV announcers (ESPN/ESPN Radio): Bob Wischusen (Play-by-play), Mack Brown (Color), & Kaylee Hartung (Sideline)/Bill Rosinski (Play-by-play), David Norrie (Color), & Joe Schad (Sideline)

Game information

First quarter

- ULL – C.J. Bates 17-yard TD pass from Terrance Broadway, Hunter Stover kick good, 11:26 (ULL 7–0)
- ULL – Stover 46-yard field goal, 2:55 (ULL 10–0)

Second quarter

- NEV – Brent Zuzo 21-yard field goal, 2:42 (ULL 10–3)

Fourth quarter

- ULL – Stover 30-yard field goal, 11:51 (ULL 13–3)
- ULL – Stover 35-yard field goal, 4:46 (ULL 16–3)

Top passers

- ULL – Terrance Broadway – 26/31, 227 yards, TD
- NEV – Cody Fajardo – 14/29, 124 yards

Top rushers

- ULL – Elijah McGuire – 16 carries, 99 yards
- NEV – Cody Fajardo – 13 carries, 49 yards

Top receivers

- ULL – Elijah McGuire – 5 receptions, 54 yards
- NEV – Richy Turner – 5 receptions, 46 yards
