= 2012 Louisiana–Lafayette Ragin' Cajuns football team =

American college football season

2012 Louisiana–Lafayette Ragin' Cajuns football

New Orleans Bowl champion

New Orleans Bowl, W 43–34 vs. East Carolina
- Conference: Sun Belt Conference
- Record: 5–4, 4 wins vacated (4–2 Sun Belt, 2 wins vacated)
- Head coach: Mark Hudspeth (2nd season)
- Offensive coordinator: Jay Johnson (2nd season)
- Offensive scheme: Spread
- Defensive coordinator: Greg Stewart (2nd season)
- Base defense: 4–3
- Home stadium: Cajun Field

2012 Sun Belt Conference football standings
	Conf.			Overall
Team	W		L	W		L
Arkansas State $	7	–	1	10	–	3
Louisiana–Monroe	6	–	2	8	–	5
Middle Tennessee	6	–	2	8	–	4
Louisiana–Lafayette *	4	–	2	5	–	4
Western Kentucky	4	–	4	7	–	6
Troy	3	–	5	5	–	7
North Texas	3	–	5	4	–	8
Florida Atlantic	2	–	6	3	–	9
FIU	2	–	6	3	–	9
South Alabama **	1	–	7	2	–	11
$ – Conference champion; * – Louisiana–Lafayette vacated 4 wins due to NCAA violations. ** – South Alabama was ineligible for the conference title or a bowl game as part of their transition to the FBS.

The 2012 Louisiana–Lafayette Ragin' Cajuns football program represented the University of Louisiana at Lafayette in the 2012 NCAA Division I FBS football season. They were led by second-year head coach Mark Hudspeth and played their home games at Cajun Field. They were a member of the Sun Belt Conference. However, in 2015 Louisiana–Lafayette vacated four wins due to major NCAA violations.

== Preseason ==
=== Award watchlists ===
Award	Player	Position	Year
Manning Award	Blaine Gautier	QB	SR
Rimington Trophy	Andre Huval	C	JR
Lou Groza Award	Brett Baer	K	SR

=== Sun Belt Media Day ===
==== Predicted standings ====
Sun Belt Conference predicted standings
Predicted finish	Team	Votes (1st Place)
1	Florida International	92 (5)
2	Arkansas State	85 (2)
3	Louisiana-Lafayette	81 (2)
4	Western Kentucky	70 (1)
5	Troy	60
6	Louisiana-Monroe	47
7	Middle Tennessee	42
8	North Texas	36
9	Florida Atlantic	23
10	South Alabama	14

==== Preseason All–Conference Team ====
Offense

RB Alonzo Harris
WR Javone Lawson
OL Leonardo Bates

Defense

DB Melvin White

Specialists

PK Brett Baer

== Roster ==
2012 Louisiana-Lafayette Ragin' Cajuns football team roster
Players
Coaches
Offense

Pos.	#	Name	Class
WR	2	La Marcus Allen	Fr
RB	3	Montrel Carter	Fr
WR	4	Javone Lawson	Sr
WR	5	Lance Pace	Fr
QB	6	Jalen Nixon	Fr
QB	7	D'Shaie Landon	Fr
QB	8	Terrance Broadway	So
WR	9	Harry Peoples	Sr
TE	10	Larry Pettis	So
WR	11	James Butler	So
QB	13	Brady Thomas	Sr
WR	15	Jamal Robinson	So
QB	16	Brooks Haack	Fr
QB	17	Blaine Gautier	Sr
QB	19	Riley Saunders	Jr
WR	23	Bradley Brown	Jr
RB	26	Yobes Walker	Sr
WR	27	Billy Christian	So
RB	28	Marcus Jackson	So
WR	30	Brandon Stewart	Fr
RB	31	Effrem Reed	Fr
RB	36	Mitchell Cunningham	Fr
WR	39	Tyler Morvant	Fr
RB	41	Torrey Pierce	Fr
TE	43	Thomas Singleton	Fr
RB	46	Alonzo Harris	So
OL	54	Kevon Foster	Fr
OL	60	Tyler Bergeron	So
OL	61	Joseph Brunson	Fr
OL	62	Jarad Martin	So
OL	63	Jeremy Sparks	Fr
OL	65	Zach Tarver	Fr
OL	67	Daniel Quave	So
OL	68	Octravian Anderson	Fr
OL	69	Greg Siener	Fr
OL	70	Mykhael Quave	Fr
OL	71	Andre Huval	Jr
OL	72	Leonard Bates	Sr
OL	73	Ethan Rosenbalm	Fr
OL	75	Terry Johnson	So
OL	76	Jaron Odom	Sr
OL	78	Daniel Lemelle	Jr
OL	79	Evyn Perry	Jr
WR	80	Adam Savoie	Fr
WR	83	Jared Johnson	Fr
WR	84	Devin Figaro	So
TE	85	Ian Thompson	Jr
TE	86	Jacob Maxwell	Jr
WR	87	Darryl Surgent	Jr
TE	88	Andrew Hebert	Jr

Defense

Pos.	#	Name	Class
CB	2	JeMarlous Moten	Sr
CB	3	Jamal Rainy	Fr
CB	4	Dominick Jones	Jr
S	5	Darius Barksdale	So
CB	11	O' Neil Parker	Fr
S	15	Chris Faber	So
S	16	Al Riles	Fr
CB	18	Jevante Watson	Fr
S	19	Zachary DeGrange	Fr
LB	20	Will Burrowes	Jr
S	21	Rodney Gillis	Sr
CB	22	Melvin White	Sr
CB	24	Sean Thomas	So
S	25	Chris Morgan	Fr
S	27	T.J. Worthy	Fr
LB	29	Tyren Alexander	Fr
LB	29	Zach Bourque	So
LB	30	Le'Marcus Gibson	Sr
S	33	Trevence Patt	So
LB	34	Justin Anderson	Jr
LB	35	Boris Anyama	So
S	37	Hunter Thibodeaux	Jr
LB	38	Trae Johnson	So
LB	39	Chris Hill	Fr
LB	44	Kevin Fouquier	Fr
DE	45	Emeke Onyenekwu	Sr
DE	47	Blake Comminie	Sr
LB	50	Rodney Smith, Jr.	Fr
LB	51	Tre'Maine Lightfoot	Fr
LB	52	Dominique Tovell	Fr
DL	53	Remaine Douglas	Fr
LB	55	Brandon Nash	Jr
LB	56	Christian Sager	So
DE	57	Chris Prater	Fr
LB	58	Nick Barnfield	Jr
LB	59	Jake Molbert	So
DL	64	Ben Duhon	Sr
DL	66	Marvin Martin	So
DL	74	Justin Hamilton	So
DL	90	Blain Winston	Fr
DL	92	Christian Ringo	So
DL	93	Cordian Hagans	Sr
DL	94	Karmichael Dunbar	Fr
DL	96	Brandon McCray	Jr
DL	97	Jalen Fields	Jr
DL	99	Darrien Batiste	Fr

Special teams

Pos.	#	Name	Class
K	33	Travis Shinn	Fr
K	40	Brett Baer	Sr
LS	49	Matt Rosenbalm	Sr
LS	50	Jake Guidry	Fr
LS	82	John Broussard	So
K	91	Carlos Alvarez	So
K	95	Hunter Stover	So

Head coach

- Mark Hudspeth (Delta State)

Coordinators/assistant coaches

- Jay Johnson (Northern Iowa)
  Offensive coordinator
- Marquase Lovings (Howard)
  Assistant head coach
- Jorge Munoz (Bethany (KS))
  Assistant head coach
- Mitch Rodrigue (Nicholls State)
  Assistant head coach
- Tommy Rybacki (Jacksonville State)
  Outside linebackers
- Reed Stringer (Delta State)
  Assistant head coach
- Rusty Whitt (Abilene Christian)
  Strength & conditioning coach
- Troy Wingerter (Louisiana)
  Director of football operations
- Ryan Trichel (Southeastern Louisiana)
  Ass. Recruiting coordinator/Ass. Director of football operations

Legend

- (C) Team captain
- (S) Suspended
- (I) Ineligible
- Injured
- Redshirt

== Schedule ==
Date	Time	Opponent	Site	TV	Result	Attendance
September 1	6:00 pm	Lamar*	Cajun Field; Lafayette, LA (Sabine Shoe)	RCN/ESPN3	W 40–0 (vacated)	25,803
September 8	6:00 pm	at Troy	Veterans Memorial Stadium; Troy, AL	ESPN3	W 37–24 (vacated)	17,981
September 15	11:00 am	at Oklahoma State*	Boone Pickens Stadium; Stillwater, OK	FSN	L 24–65	56,062
September 29	6:00 pm	FIU	Cajun Field; Lafayette, LA	ESPN3	W 48–20 (vacated)	21,109
October 6	4:00 pm	Tulane*^{†}	Cajun Field; Lafayette, LA	RCN/ESPN3	W 41–13 (vacated)	29,758
October 16	8:00 pm	at North Texas	Apogee Stadium; Denton, TX	ESPN2	L 23–30	17,055
October 23	7:00 pm	Arkansas State	Cajun Field; Lafayette, LA	ESPN2	L 27–50	19,873
November 3	3:00 pm	at Louisiana–Monroe	Malone Stadium; Monroe, LA (Battle on the Bayou)	SBN/CSS	W 40–24	20,203
November 10	11:21 am	at No. 7 Florida*	Ben Hill Griffin Stadium; Gainesville, FL	SECN	L 20–27	86,482
November 17	6:00 pm	Western Kentucky	Cajun Field; Lafayette, LA		W 31–27	20,314
November 24	4:00 pm	South Alabama	Cajun Field; Lafayette, LA	RCN/ESPN3	W 52–30	20,333
December 1	2:00 pm	at Florida Atlantic	FAU Stadium; Boca Raton, FL		W 35–21	11,522
December 22	11:00 am	vs. East Carolina*	Mercedes-Benz Superdome; New Orleans, LA (New Orleans Bowl)	ESPN	W 43–34	48,828
*Non-conference game; ^{†}Homecoming; Rankings from Coaches' Poll released prior to the game; All times are in Central time

- Source: Schedule

== Game summaries ==
=== Lamar ===
Lamar at Louisiana-Lafayette – Game summary

Quarter	1	2	3	4	Total
Cardinals	0	0	0	0	0
Ragin' Cajuns	13	27	0	0	40

at Cajun Field, Lafayette, LA

- Date: September 1
- Game time: 6:00 p.m. CST
- Game weather: 83 °F (28 °C); cloudy, possible rain
- Game attendance: 25,803
- Referee: Stan Sence

Game information

First quarter

- ULL - Brett Baer 52-yard field goal, 13:04 (ULL 3-0)
- ULL - Jacob Maxwell 2-yard TD pass from Blaine Gautier, Baer kick good, 9:29 (ULL 10-0)
- ULL - Baer 40-yard field goal, 6:05 (ULL 13-0)

Second quarter

- ULL - Alonzo Harris 1-yard TD run, Baer kick good, 14:56 (ULL 20-0)
- ULL - Effrem Reed 2-yard TD run, Baer kick good, 11:24 (ULL 27-0)
- ULL - Baer 39-yard field goal, 9:38 (ULL 30-0)
- ULL - Baer 32-yard field goal, 4:43 (ULL 33-0)
- ULL - Javone Lawson 2-yard TD pass from Gautier, Baer kick good, 0:12 (ULL 40-0)

Top passers

- ULL - Blaine Gautier - 7/18, 142 yards, 2 TD
- LAM - Ryan Mossakowski - 12/19, 81 yards

Top rushers

- ULL - Effrem Reed - 7 carries, 55 yards, TD
- LAM - Herschel Sims - 14 carries, 42 yards

Top receivers

- ULL - Jamal Robinson - reception, 86 yards
- LAM - Barry Ford - 5 receptions, 48 yards

=== @ Troy ===
Louisiana-Lafayette at Troy – Game summary

Quarter	1	2	3	4	Total
Ragin' Cajuns	14	6	10	7	37
Trojans	7	7	3	7	24

at Veterans Memorial Stadium, Troy, AL

- Date: September 8
- Game time: 6:00 p.m. CST
- Game weather: 77 °F (25 °C); partly cloudy
- Game attendance: 17,981
- Referee: Kevin Stine

Game information

First quarter

- TROY - Deon Anthony 11-yard TD run, Will Scott kick good, 12:15 (TROY 7-0)
- ULL - Blaine Gautier 10-yard TD run, Brett Baer kick good, 3:37 (TIE 7-7)
- ULL - Jermarlo Moten 56-yard fumble recovered for TD, Baer kick good, (ULL 14-7)

Second quarter

- ULL - Baer 25-yard field goal, 13:18 (ULL 17-7)
- ULL - Baer 25-yard field goal, 7:35 (ULL 20-7)
- TROY - J. Robinson 5-yard TD pass from Corey Robinson, Scott kick good, 0:52 (ULL 20-14)

Third quarter

- TROY - Scott 33-yard field goal, 9:50 (ULL 20-17)
- ULL - Harry Peoples 9-yard TD pass from Terrance Broadway, Baer kick good, 8:16 (ULL 27-17)
- ULL - Baer 32-yard field goal, 3:54 (ULL 30-17)
- ULL - Alonzo Harris 2-yard TD run, Baer kick good, 9:14 (ULL 37-17)
- TROY - Eric Thomas 5-yard TD pass from C. Robinson, Scott kick good, 3:12 (ULL 37-24)

Top passers

- ULL - Terrance Broadway - 10/16, 143 yards, TD
- TROY - Corey Robinson - 46/700, 485 yards, 2 TD, INT

Top rushers

- ULL - Alonzo Harris - 21 carries, 137 yards, TD
- TROY - Shawn Southward - 16 carries, 33 yards

Top receivers

- ULL - Darryl Surgent - 4 receptions, 61 yards
- TROY - Chandler Worthy - 9 receptions, 154 yards

=== @ Oklahoma State ===
Louisiana-Lafayette at Oklahoma State – Game summary

Quarter	1	2	3	4	Total
Ragin' Cajuns	0	0	10	14	24
Cowboys	17	27	14	7	65

at Boone Pickens Stadium, Stillwater, OK

- Date: September 15
- Game time: 11:05 a.m. CST
- Game weather: 61 °F (16 °C); cloudy
- Game attendance: 56,062
- Referee: Scott Novak
- TV: FSN

Game information

First quarter

- OSU - Quinn Sharp 51-yard field goal, 12:50 (OSU 3-0)
- OSU - Kye Staley 52-yard TD pass from J. W. Walsh, Sharp kick good, 9:14 (OSU 10-0)
- OSU - Joseph Randle 8-yard TD run, Sharp kick good, 6:03 (OSU 17-0)

Second quarter

- OSU - Randle 2-yard TD run, Sharp kick good, 14:29 (OSU 24-0)
- OSU - Blake Jackson 20-yard TD pass from Walsh, Sharp kick good, 11:11 (OSU 31-0)
- OSU - Josh Stewart33-yard TD pass from Walsh, Sharp kick good, 6:57 (OSU 38-0)
- OSU - Sharp 25-yard field goal, 0:10 (OSU 41-0)
- OSU - Sharp 44-yard field goal, 0:00 (OSU 44-0)

Third quarter

- ULL - Darryl Surgent 73-yard TD pass from Blaine Gautier, Brett Baer kick good, 12:00 (OSU 44-7)
- OSU - Walsh 4-yard TD run, Sharp kick good, 7:59 (OSU 51-7)
- ULL - Baer 41-yard field goal, 5:06 (OSU 51-10)
- OSU - Stewart 17-yard TD pass from Walsh, Sharp kick good, 2:13 (OSU 58-10)

Fourth quarter

- ULL - Marcus Jackson 1-yard TD run, Baer kick good, 11:18 (OSU 58-17)
- OSU - Desmond Roland 3-yard TD run, Sharp kick good, 8:50 (OSU 65-17)
- ULL - Gautier 10-yard TD run, Baer kick good, 4:08 (OSU 65-24)

Top passers

- OSU - J. W. Walsh - 21/30, 347 yards, 4 TD
- ULL - Blaine Gautier - 16/31, 236 yards, TD

Top rushers

- OSU - Joseph Randle - 21 carries, 105 yards, 2 TD
- ULL - Effrem Reed - 7 carries, 45 yards

Top receivers

- OSU - Blake Jackson - 5 receptions, 112 yards, TD
- ULL - Javone Lawson - 8 receptions, 92 yards

=== FIU ===
Florida International at Louisiana-Lafayette – Game summary

Quarter	1	2	3	4	Total
Panthers	0	14	6	0	20
Ragin' Cajuns	17	14	10	7	48

at Cajun Field, Lafayette, LA

- Date: September 29
- Game time: 6:00 p.m. CST
- Game weather: 77 °F (25 °C); partly cloudy
- Game attendance: 21,109
- Referee: Jeff Hilyer
- TV: ESPN3

Game information

First quarter

- ULL - Blaine Gautier 3-yard TD run, Brett Baer kick good, 7:06 (ULL 7-0)
- ULL - Jacob Maxwell 2-yard TD pass from Gautier, Baer kick good, 2:30 (ULL 14-0)
- ULL - Baer 46-yard field goal, 0:55 (ULL 17-0)

Second quarter

- ULL - Terrance Broadway 13-yard TD run, Baer kick good, 11:38 (ULL 24-0)
- FIU - E.J. Hilliard 3-yard TD run, Jack Griffin kick good, 10:19 (ULL 24-7)
- FIU - Jeremiah Harden 1-yard TD run, Griffin kick good, 5:59 (ULL 24-14)
- ULL - Broadway 4-yard TD run, Baer kick good, 0:43 (ULL 31-14)

Third quarter

- ULL - Harry Peoples 78-yard TD pass from Broadway, Baer kick good, 14:11 (ULL 38-14)
- ULL - Baer 23-yard field goal, 10:49 (ULL 41-14)
- FIU - Kedrick Rhodes 1-yard TD run, Hilliard two-point conversion run no good, 2:03 (ULL 41-20)

Fourth quarter

- ULL - Effrem Reed 7-yard TD run, Baer kick good, 14:56 (ULL 48-20)

Top passers

- ULL - Terrance Broadway - 15/19, 228 yards, TD
- FIU - E.J. Hilliard - 16/26, 204 yards, 2 INT

Top rushers

- ULL - Effrem Reed - 11 carries, 62 yards, TD
- FIU - Jeremiah Harden - 7 carries, 30 yards, TD

Top receivers

- ULL - Harry Peoples - 10 receptions, 151 yards, TD
- FIU - Willis Wright - reception, 58 yards

=== Tulane ===
Tulane at Louisiana-Lafayette – Game summary

Quarter	1	2	3	4	Total
Green Wave	0	10	0	3	13
Ragin' Cajuns	3	21	14	3	41

at Cajun Field, Lafayette, LA

- Date: October 6
- Game time: 4:00 p.m. CST
- Game weather: 78 °F (26 °C); clear
- Game attendance: 29,758
- Referee: Brad Rogers
- TV: ESPN3

Game information

First quarter

- ULL - Brett Baer 46-yard field goal, 11:33 (ULL 3-0)

Second quarter

- ULL - Javone Lawson 23-yard TD pass from Terrance Broadway, Baer kick good, 12:43 (ULL 10-0)
- ULL - Justin Anderson 38-yard interception return for TD, Baer kick good, 6:56 (ULL 17-0)
- TULN - Justyn Shakleford 71-yard TD pass from D.J. Ponder, Cairo Santos kick good, 5:18 (ULL 17-7)
- ULL - Broadway 10-yard TD run, Baer kick good, 1:45 (ULL 24-7)
- TULN - Santos 40-yard field goal, 0:09 (ULL 24-10)

Third quarter

- ULL - Lawson 20-yard TD pass from Broadway, Baer kick good, 11:07 (ULL 31-10)
- ULL - Alonzo Harris 1-yard TD run, Baer kick good, 4:44 (ULL 38-10)

Fourth quarter

- TULN - Santos 47-yard field goal, 14:46 (ULL 38-13)
- ULL - Baer 31-yard field goal, 6:45 (ULL 41-13)

Top passers

- ULL - Terrance Broadway - 9/22, 150 yards, 2 TD, INT
- TULN - D.J. Ponder - 14/39, 173 yards, TD, 2 INT

Top rushers

- ULL - Alonzo Harris - 23 carries, 123 yards, TD
- TULN - Rob Kelley - 10 carries, 55 yards

Top receivers

- ULL - Javone Lawson - 4 receptions, 82 yards, 2 TD
- TULN - Justyn Shakleford - 3 receptions, 96 yards, TD

=== @ North Texas ===
Louisiana-Lafayette at North Texas – Game summary

Quarter	1	2	3	4	Total
Ragin' Cajuns	6	7	7	3	23
Mean Green	0	6	14	10	30

at Apogee Stadium, Denton, TX

- Date: October 16
- Game time: 8:00 p.m. CST
- Game weather: 72 °F (22 °C); clear
- Game attendance: 17,055
- Referee: Riley Johnson
- TV: ESPN2

Game information

First quarter

- ULL - Effrem Reed 1-yard TD run, Brett Baer kick no good, 5:37 (ULL 6-0)

Second quarter

- UNT - Zach Olen 25-yard field goal, 7:08 (ULL 6-3)
- ULL - Terrance Broadway 75-yard TD run, Baer kick good, 6:53 (ULL 13-3)
- UNT - Olen 24-yard field goal, 0:52 (ULL 13-6)

Third quarter

- ULL - Harry Peoples 10-yard TD from Broadway, 12:35 (ULL 20-6)
- UNT - Antoinne Jimmerson 28-yard TD pass from Derek Thompson, Olen kick good, 5:04 (ULL 20-13)
- UNT - Brelan Chancellor 34-yard TD run, Olen kick good, 3:42 (TIE 20-20)

Fourth quarter

- UNT - Olen 22-yard field goal, 11:44 (UNT 23-20)
- ULL - Baer 47-yard field goal, 3:01 (TIE 23-23)
- UNT - Jimmerson 78-yard TD pass from Thompson, Olen kick good, 1:54 (UNT 30-23

Top passers

- UNT - Derek Thompson - 17/28, 282 yards, 2 TD
- ULL - Terrance Broadway - 26/41, 265 yards, TD, INT

Top rushers

- UNT - Brandin Boyd - 22 carries, 88 yards
- ULL - Terrance Broadway - 5 carries, 84 yards, TD

Top receivers

- UNT - Antoinne Jimmerson - 2 receptions, 106 yards, 2 TD
- ULL - Javone Lawson - 5 receptions, 78 yards

=== Arkansas State ===
Arkansas State at Louisiana-Lafayette – Game summary

Quarter	1	2	3	4	Total
Red Wolves	6	20	14	10	50
Ragin' Cajuns	0	7	7	13	27

at Cajun Field, Lafayette, LA

- Date: October 23
- Game time: 7:00 p.m. CST
- Game weather: 80 °F (27 °C); clear
- Game attendance: `9,873
- Referee: Jeff Hilyer
- TV: ESPN2

Game information

First quarter

- ARST - Brian Davis 47-yard field goal, 10:29 (ARST 3-0)
- ARST - Davis 22-yard field goal, 4:38 (ARST 6-0)

Second quarter

- ARST - Frankie Jackson 11-yard TD run, Davis kick good, 14:53 (ARST 13-0)
- ARST - Julian Jones 35-yard TD pass from Ryan Aplin, Davis kick good, 14:09 (ARST 20-0)
- ULL - Darryl Surgent 38-yard TD pass from Terrance Broadway, Brett Baer kick good, 7:01 (ARST 20-7)
- ARST - Davis 45-yard field goal, 4:18 (ARST 23-7)
- ARST - Davis 21-yard field goal, 0:21 (ARST 26-7)

Third quarter

- ULL - Surgent 25-yard TD pass from Broadway, Baer kick good, 12:16 (ARST 26-14)
- ARST - David Oku 5-yard TD run, Davis kick good, 5:23 (ARST 32-14)
- ARST - Rocky Hayes 57-yard TD run, Davis kick good, 1:53 (ARST 40-14)

Fourth quarter

- ARST - Davis 29-yard field goal, 8:58 (ARST 43-14)
- ULL - Torrey Pierce 5-yard TD run, Baer kick good, 6:58 (ARST 43-21)
- ARST - Jackson 2-yard TD run, Davis kick good, 1:07 (ARST 50-21)
- ULL - James Butler 4-yard TD pass from Broadway, 0:00 (ARST 50-27)

Top passers

- ARST - Ryan Aplin - 21/31, 269 yards, TD
- ULL - Terrance Broadway - 28/39, 374 yards, 3 TD, 3 INT

Top rushers

- ARST - Rocky Hayes - 3 carries, 86 yards, TD
- ULL - Alonzo Harris - 7 carries, 27 yards

Top receivers

- ARST - Josh Jarboe - 4 receptions, 67 yards
- ULL - Darryl Surgent - 5 receptions, 107 yards, 2 TD

=== @ Louisiana–Monroe ===
Louisiana-Lafayette at Louisiana-Monroe – Game summary

Quarter	1	2	3	4	Total
Ragin' Cajuns	7	14	7	12	40
Warhawks	10	7	0	7	24

at Malone Stadium, Monroe, LA

- Date: November 3
- Game time: 3:00 p.m. CST
- Game weather: 84 °F (29 °C); partly cloudy
- Game attendance: 20,203
- Referee: Tony Backert
- TV: ESPN3

Game information

First quarter

- ULL - Alonzo Harris 12-yard TD run, Brett Baer kick good, 7:55 (ULL 7-0)
- ULM - Tavarese Maye 81-yard TD pass from Kolton Browning, Justin Manton kick good, 7:40 (TIE 7-7)
- ULM - Manton 23-yard field goal, 0:48 (ULM 10-7)

Second quarter

- ULL - Jamal Robinson 52-yard TD pass from Terrance Broadway, Baer kick good, 13:30 (ULL 14-10)
- ULL - Harry Peoples 23-yard TD pass from Broadway, Baer kick good, 4:46 (ULL 21-10)
- ULM - Je'Ron Hamm 19-yard TD pass from Cody Wells, Manton kick good, 0:48 (ULL 21-17)

Third quarter

- ULL - Broadway 7-yard TD run, Baer kick good, 6:36 (ULL 28-17)

Fourth quarter

- ULL - Jacob Maxwell 1-yard TD pass from Broadway, Baer kick no good, 5:47 (ULL 34-17)
- ULM - Brent Leonard 22-yard TD pass from Wells, Manton kick good, 4:30 (ULL 34-24)
- ULL - Robinson 81-yard TD pass from Broadway, 0:00 (ULL 40-24)

Top passers

- ULL - Terrance Broadway - 23/32, 373 yards, 4 TD, INT
- ULM - Cody Wells - 18/31, 209 yards, 2 TD, 2 INT

Top rushers

- ULL - Terrance Broadway - 14 carries, 87 yards, TD
- ULM - Monterrell Washington - 12 carries, 41 yards

Top receivers

- ULL - Jamal Robinson - 3 receptions, 153 yards, 2 TD
- ULM - Brent Leonard - 11 receptions, 168 yards, TD

=== @ Florida ===
Louisiana-Lafayette at Florida – Game summary

Quarter	1	2	3	4	Total
Ragin' Cajuns	3	0	14	3	20
No. 6 Gators	3	7	3	14	27

at Ben Hill Griffin Stadium, Gainesville, FL

- Date: November 10
- Game time: 11:20 a.m. CST
- Game weather: 72 °F (22 °C); sunny
- Game attendance: 86,482
- Referee: David Smith
- TV: SECN

Game information

First quarter

- FLA - Caleb Sturgis 38-yard field goal, 11:22 (FLA 3-0)
- ULL - Brett Baer 49-yard field goal, 4:02 (TIE 3-3)

Second quarter

- FLA - Trey Burton 2-yard TD pass from Jeff Driskel, Sturgis kick good, 0:07 (FLA 10-3)

Third quarter

- FLA - Sturgis 21-yard field goal, 12:43 (FLA 13-3)
- ULL - Alonzo Harris 2-yard TD run, Baer kick good, 8:35 (FLA 13-10)
- ULL - Blake Comminie 22-yard punt block returned for TD, Baer kick good, 4:03 (ULL 17-13)

Fourth quarter

- ULL - Baer 22-yard field goal, 13:11 (ULL 20-13)
- FLA - Quinton Dunbar 3-yard TD pass from Jacoby Brissett, Sturgis kick good, 1:42 (TIE 20-20)
- FLA - Jelani Jenkins 36-yard punt return for TD, Sturgis kick good, 0:02 (FLA 27-20)

Top passers

- FLA - Jeff Driskel - 13/16, 98 yards, TD
- ULL - Terrance Broadway - 16/23, 171 yards

Top rushers

- FLA - Jeff Driskel - 12 carries, 76 yards
- ULL - Alonzo Harris - 20 carries, 68 yards, TD

Top receivers

- FLA - Jordan Reed - 5 receptions, 85 yards
- ULL - Harry Peoples - 10 receptions, 73 yards

=== Western Kentucky ===
Western Kentucky at Louisiana-Lafayette – Game summary

Quarter	1	2	3	4	Total
Hilltoppers	0	10	3	14	27
Ragin' Cajuns	0	10	7	14	31

at Cajun Field, Lafayette, LA

- Date: November 17
- Game time: 6:00 p.m. CST
- Game weather: 65 °F (18 °C); clear
- Game attendance: 20,314
- Referee: Riley Johnson

Game information

First quarter

- WKU - Keshawn Simpson 1-yard TD run, Garrett Schwettman kick good, 10:16 (WKU 7-0)
- ULL - Torrey Pierce 18-yard TD run, Brett Baer kick good, 8:18 (TIE 7-7)
- WKU - Schwettman 42-yard field goal, 6:08 (WKU 10-7)
- ULL - Baer 23-yard field goal, 0:00 (TIE 10-10)

Second quarter

- WKU - Schwettman 25-yard field goal, 7:19 (WKU 13-10)
- ULL - Pierce 15-yard TD run, Baer kick good, 2:51 (ULL 17-13)

Fourth quarter

- WKU - Antonio Andrews 17-yard TD run, Schwettman kick good, 14:19 (WKU 20-17)
- WKU - Andrews 13-yard TD run, Schwettman kick good, 6:00 (WKU 27-17)
- ULL - Jamal Robinson 4-yard TD pass from Terrance Broadway, Baer kick good, 2:43 (WKU 27-24)
- ULL - Broadway 14-yard TD run, Baer kick good, 0:38 (ULL 31-27)

Top passers

- ULL - Terrance Broadway - 23/33, 258 yards, TD, 2 INT
- WKU - Kawaun Jakes - 10/18, 149 yards, INT

Top rushers

- ULL - Terrance Broadway - 14 carries, 145 yards, TD
- WKU - Antonio Andrews - 37 carries, 238 yards, 2 TD

Top receivers

- ULL - Harry Peoples - 13 receptions, 144 yards
- WKU - Jack Doyle - 3 receptions, 59 yards

=== South Alabama ===
South Alabama at Louisiana-Lafayette – Game summary

Quarter	1	2	3	4	Total
Jaguars	7	9	7	7	30
Ragin' Cajuns	17	7	14	14	52

at Cajun Field, Lafayette, LA

- Date: November 24
- Game time: 4:00 p.m. CST
- Game weather: 55 °F (13 °C); clear
- Game attendance: 20,333
- Referee: Kevin Stone

Game information

First quarter

- USA - Julien Valentin 1-yard TD run, Michel Chapuseaux kick good, 11:05 (USA 7-0)
- ULL - Brett Baer 27-yard field goal, 8:40 (USA 7-3)
- ULL - Harry Peoples 75-yard TD pass from Terrance Broadway, Baer kick good, 4:17 (ULL 10-7)
- ULL - Effrem Reed 19-yard TD run, Baer kick good, 3:18 (ULL 17-7)

Second quarter

- USA - Chapuseaux 45-yard field goal, 14:08 (ULL 17-10)
- USA - Chapuseaux 33-yard field goal, 9:25 (ULL 17-13)
- USA - Chapuseaux 50-yard field goal, 6:13 (ULL 17-16)
- ULL - Javone Lawson 27-yard TD pass from Broadway, Baer kick good, 0:16 (ULL 24-17)

Third quarter

- ULL - Effrem Reed 1-yard TD run, Baer kick good, 13:32 (ULL 31-16)
- ULL - Broadway 6-yard TD run, Baer kick good, 8:25 (ULL 38-16)
- USA - Jereme Jones 23-yard TD pass from Ross Metheny, Chapuseaux kick good, 2:27 (ULL 38-23)

Fourth quarter

- ULL - Jacob Maxwell 18-yard TD pass from Blaine Gautier, Baer kick good, 13:50 (ULL 45-23)
- USA - Gabe Loper 28-yard TD pass from Metheny, Chapuseaux kick good, 7:26 (ULL 45-30)
- ULL - Yobes Walker 1-yard TD run, Baer kick good, 3:33 (ULL 52-30)

Top passers

- ULL - Terrance Broadway - 11/19, 305 yards, 2 TD
- USA - Ross Metheny - 27/44, 360 yards, 2 TD

Top rushers

- ULL - Effrem Reed - 17 carries, 81 yards, 2 TD
- USA - Julien Valentin - 3 carries, 34 yards, TD

Top receivers

- ULL - Harry Peoples - 5 receptions, 168 yards, TD
- USA - Wes Saxton - 7 receptions, 83 yards

=== @ Florida Atlantic ===
Louisiana-Lafayette at Florida Atlantic – Game summary

Quarter	1	2	3	4	Total
Ragin' Cajuns	7	14	7	7	35
Owls	14	0	0	7	21

at FAU Stadium, Boca Raton, FL

- Date: December 1
- Game time: 2:00 p.m. CST
- Game weather: 75 °F (24 °C); partly cloudy
- Game attendance: 11,522
- Referee: Tony Backert

Game information

First quarter

- ULL - Terrance Broadway 77-yard TD run, Brett Baer kick good, 13:46 (ULL 7-0)
- FAU - William Dukes 75-yard TD pass from Graham Wilbert, Mitch Anderson kick good, 13:29 (TIE 7-7)
- FAU - Jonathan Wallace 11-yard TD run, Anderson kick good, 0:37 (FAU 14-7)

Second quarter

- ULL - Alonzo Harris 9-yard TD run, Baer kick good, 6:33 (TIE 14-14)
- ULL - James Butler 15-yard TD pass from Terrance Broadway, Baer kick good, 0:35 (ULL 21-14)

Third quarter

- ULL - Harris 2-yard TD run, Baer kick good, 7:17 (ULL 28-14)

Fourth quarter

- FAU - Dukes 42-yard TD pass from Wilbert, Anderson kick good, 13:16 (ULL 28-21)
- ULL - Harris 2-yard TD run, Baer kick good, 7:06 (ULL 35-21)

Top passers

- ULL - Terrance Broadway - 13/19, 168 yards, TD
- FAU - Graham Gilbert - 25/38, 379 yards, 2 TD, 2 INT

Top rushers

- ULL - Alonzo Harris - 21 carries, 127 yards, 2 TD
- FAU - Jonathan Wallace - 18 carries, 86 yards, TD

Top receivers

- ULL - Jamal Robinson - 3 receptions, 64 yards
- FAU - William Dukes - 9 receptions, 204 yards, 2 TD

=== East Carolina–New Orleans Bowl ===
East Carolina vs. Louisiana-Lafayette – Game summary

Quarter	1	2	3	4	Total
Pirates	0	21	10	3	34
Ragin' Cajuns	7	24	6	6	43

at Mercedes-Benz Superdome, New Orleans, LA

- Date: December 22
- Game time: 11:00 a.m. CST
- Game weather: 70 °F (21 °C); N/A (indoors)
- Game attendance: 48,828
- Referee: Clair Gausman

Game information

First quarter

- ULL - Terrance Broadway 12-yard TD run, Brett Baer kick good, 8:10 (ULL 7-0)

Second quarter

- ULL - Harry Peoples 10-yard TD run, Baer kick good, 14:17 (ULL 14-0)
- ECU - Reggie Bullock 5-yard TD run, Warren Harvey kick good, 12:48 (ULL 14-7)
- ULL - Alonzo Harris 6-yard TD run, Baer kick good, 11:07 (ULL 21-7)
- ULL - Harris 68-yard TD run, Baer kick good, 7:05 (ULL 28-7)
- ECU - Justin Hardy 19-yard TD pass from Shane Carden, Harvey kick good, 3:09 (ULL 28-14)
- ECU - Danny Webster 16-yard TD pass from Carden, Harvey kick good, 2:56 (ULL 28-21)
- ULL - Baer 50-yard field goal, 0:00 (ULL 31-21)

Third quarter

- ECU - Harvey 45-yard field goal, 9:46 (ULL 31-24)
- ECU - Bullock 13-yard TD run, Harvey kick good, 5:57 (TIE 31-31)
- ULL - Javone Lawson 14-yard TD pass from Broadway, Baer kick no good, 13:07 (ULL 37-31)

Fourth quarter

- ECU - Harvey 26-yard field goal, 13:36 (ULL 37-34)
- ULL - Baer 25-yard field goal, 3:11 (ULL 40-34
- ULL - Baer 40-yard field goal, 0:10 (ULL 43-34

Top passers

- ULL - Terrance Broadway - 21/32, 316 yards, TD, INT
- ECU - Shane Carden - 25/42, 278 yards, 2 TD, INT

Top rushers

- ULL - Alonzo Harris - 21 carries, 120 yards, 2 TD
- ECU - Reggie Bullock - 17 carries, 104 yards, 2 TD

Top receivers

- ULL - Jamal Robinson - 6 receptions, 116 yards
- ECU - Andrew Bodenheimer - 5 receptions, 65 yards
