= 2014 New Orleans Bowl =

2014 R+L Carriers New Orleans Bowl
- 14th New Orleans Bowl
Nevada Wolf Pack	Louisiana–Lafayette Ragin' Cajuns
(7–5)	(8–4)
Mountain West	Sun Belt
3	16
Head coach: Brian Polian	Head coach: Mark Hudspeth
	1	2	3	4	Total
Nevada	0	3	0	0	3
Louisiana–Lafayette	10	0	0	6	16
- Date: December 20, 2014
- Season: 2014
- Stadium: Mercedes-Benz Superdome
- Location: New Orleans, Louisiana
- MVP: Louisiana–Lafayette QB Terrance Broadway
- Favorite: Nevada by 1.5
- National anthem: MacKenzie Bourg
- Referee: Greg Blum (MAC)
- Attendance: 34,014
- Payout: US$500,000

United States TV coverage
- Network: ESPN/ESPN Radio
- Announcers: Bob Wischusen, Mack Brown, & Kaylee Hartung (ESPN); Bill Rosinski, David Norrie, & Joe Schad (ESPN Radio)

The 2014 New Orleans Bowl was a college football bowl game played on December 20, 2014 at the Mercedes-Benz Superdome in New Orleans, Louisiana. The fourteenth annual New Orleans Bowl, it pitted the Nevada Wolf Pack of the Mountain West Conference against the Louisiana-Lafayette Ragin' Cajuns of the Sun Belt Conference. The game began at 10:00 a.m. CST and aired on ESPN. It was the first of the 2014–15 bowl games that concluded the 2014 FBS football season. Sponsored by freight shipping company R+L Carriers, the game was officially known as the R+L Carriers New Orleans Bowl. Louisiana–Lafayette beat Nevada by a score of 16–3.

== Team selection ==
The game featured the Nevada Wolf Pack of the Mountain West Conference against the Louisiana–Lafayette Ragin' Cajuns of the Sun Belt Conference, marking the second meeting between these two teams. The last and only meeting was in 1995; Nevada defeated Louisiana-Lafayette 38–14 in Reno, Nevada.

=== Nevada Wolf Pack ===
After the Wolf Pack finished the regular season with a 7–5 record, they accepted an invitation to play in their first New Orleans Bowl. They finished third in the Mountain West Conference's west division after concluding their season with a win against UNLV in the Battle for the Fremont Cannon. The Wolf Pack entered the game with a reputation as an outstanding fourth-quarter team, insofar as they ranked second in the FBS in fourth-quarter scoring margin.

=== Louisiana–Lafayette Ragin' Cajuns ===
After the Ragin' Cajuns finished the regular season with an 8–4 record, they accepted an invitation to play in the game. The game marked Louisiana–Lafayette's fourth consecutive New Orleans Bowl, tying them with the Southern Miss Golden Eagles and the North Texas Mean Green for the most appearances in the game, the only bowl game the Ragin' Cajuns have known at the Football Bowl Subdivision level. They are the three-time defending New Orleans Bowl champions, winning the 2011 game over the San Diego State Aztecs by a score of 32–30, then the 2012 game over the East Carolina Pirates by a score of 43–34, and finally the 2013 game over the Tulane Green Wave by a score of 24–21.

== Pre-game buildup ==
In a matchup that play-by-play announcer Bob Wischusen and others commented on the extent to which the two teams' "mirrored" each other, Louisiana-Lafayette (ULL) enjoyed an effective home field advantage at the Super Dome in New Orleans. Nevada opened as one-point favorites, and the game was expected to be close, yet high-scoring due to two ostensibly superior offenses. Controlling time of possession was crucial for both teams with two good offenses in play.

=== Louisiana-Lafayette ===
==== Offense ====
Dual-threat quarterback Terrance Broadway and running backs Elijah McGuire – an elusive 5 feet 11 inches (1.80 m) 198 pounds (90 kg) sophomore named the conference's offensive player of the year – and Alonzo Harris – a bruising 6 feet 1 inch (1.85 m) 238 pounds (108 kg) senior – each had over 600 yards rushing and combined for 29 touchdowns to help lead the Ragin' Cajuns' rushing attack, the fifth-best in the Sun Belt Conference. Overall, the offense averaged 30.6 points per game, 55th in the Football Bowl Subdivision (FBS), 228.4 rushing yards per game, 26th in the FBS, and 188.9 passing yards per game, 102nd in the FBS. A trio comprised the Ragin' Cajuns' upper-echelon of receivers – 6 feet 3 inches (1.91 m) senior James Butler, whose 417 yards led the team, McGuire, whose 40 receptions were best on the team, and Al Riles, a converted defensive back. Larry Pettis was the team's predominant tight end, a second team all-conference honoree The offensive line was anchored by the Quave brothers – senior Daniel, a first team all-conference honoree, and junior Mykhael Quave, a second team all-conference recipient – along with center Terry Johnson, a second team honoree. Continuity was prevalent on the line; the same five players started every game during the season, a rare feat.

==== Defense ====
A pair of defensive linemen anchored the Ragin' Cajuns defense; both Justin Hamilton and Christian Ringo earned placement on the all-conference first team. Ringo, an "indefatigable" weight lifter weighing around 300 pounds (140 kg), compiled 10.5 sacks on the season, and approached the team record. Overall, the defense managed 28 sacks, which ranked third in the conference, and was the best rushing defense in the conference. Early in the season, the team switched from a 3-4 defensive scheme to a 4-3 scheme, which helped them to apply more pressure on the quarterback. The secondary vastly improved as well, finally achieving some continuity after several injuries when a pair of freshmen safeties – Tracy Walker and Travis Crawford – became the regular starters. Cornerback Corey Trim led the team with 71 tackles and two interceptions. The linebacking corps featured Domonique Tovell, an honorable mention all-conference honoree.

=== Nevada ===
==== Offense ====
One of eight quarterbacks to lead their team in both rushing and passing, and one of two all-time FBS quarterbacks along with former Wolf Pack star Colin Kaepernick to achieve 9,000 career passing yards and 3,000 career rushing yards, senior Cody Fajardo, a four-year starter, led Nevada's offense into the bowl game seeking to build on the success that landed him as an honorable mention member of the All-Mountain West Conference team. The offense averaged 29.2 points per game, 66th in FBS, 215.2 rushing yards per game, 32nd in FBS, and 197.8 passing yards per game, 94th in FBS. Junior running back Don Jackson was close behind Fajardo in rushing yards, totaling 932 on the season along with seven touchdowns. Freshman James Butler was also key, having compiled 620 rushing yards on the season. Senior Richy Turner led the team with 58 receptions, while sophomore Jerico Richardson posted 626 receiving yards, the most on the team. Jarred Gipson was the tight end, and earned placement on the all-conference second team; he was fourth on the team in receiving. Matt Galas, a senior center, anchored a young, improved offensive line, and was a second team all-conference selection.

==== Defense ====
Defensive linemen Rykeem Yates, Brock Hekking, and Ian Seau, the latter of which is the nephew of the deceased NFL linebacker Junior Seau, earned all-conference accolades in some form, and took "turns making plays" on the overall "underwhelming" Nevada defense, which allowed 450.1 yards per game, 103rd nationally. Senior linebacker Jonathan McNeal led the defense with 95 tackles, 18 more than any other Wolf Pack defender. Nigel Haikins led a secondary that struggled at times, posting 70 tackles and three interceptions, the latter of which tied for the team lead. It was key for the Wolf Pack to contain the rush, and thus force ULL quarterback Terrance Broadway to throw the football.

== Game summary ==
=== First half ===
Louisiana-Lafayette (ULL) received the opening kickoff and, led by quarterback Terrance Broadway, moved down the field 77 yards on eight plays, scoring a touchdown via a 17-yard pass from Broadway to C.J. Bates. Subsequently, Nevada went three-and-out. Once again, ULL ran a sustained drive, but this time it stalled on the periphery of field goal range, and Hunter Stover made a 46-yard field goal, giving them a 10–0 lead. On its ensuing drive, Nevada achieved a first down, but was unable to convert a third down and short situation, instead being knocked backwards and forced to punt. Now in the second quarter, Nevada's defense forced a three-and-out, and the offense finally put together a sustained drive, entering the red zone before freshman wide receiver Wyatt Demps fumbled while running after a catch, thus turning the ball over to ULL. The Ragin' Cajuns failed to capitalize, going three-and-out, and achieving only eight yards on their punt. Nevada, starting with excellent field position at the ULL 26 yard line, drove inside the one yard line before a false start penalty decimated the drive, forcing them to settle for a field goal, making the score 10–3.

=== Second half ===
Anemic offenses characterized the beginning of the third quarter, which featured the first three drives ending in punts. The trend continued when Lenny Jones sacked Terrance Broadway, stripping the ball away and forcing a turnover. After Nevada punted on its ensuing drive, ULL managed to drive down the field and Stover kicked a 30-yard field goal to give them a 13–3 early in the fourth quarter to conclude 15-play, 77-yard drive that lasted 7:25. Nevada sought to cut the deficit early in the fourth quarter, and moved down to the 35-yard line, where they were faced with a fourth down and 10. After burning a timeout to avoid a delay of game penalty, they lined up to go for it, but they did not convert, turning the ball over on downs. ULL quickly moved down the field largely thanks to a 31-yard pass from Broadway to Gabe Fuselier, but again, failed to score a touchdown, settling for a 35-yard Stover field goal. Needing a touchdown to remain competitive in the game, Nevada took the field with 4:46 remaining. They failed. After six plays, they turned the ball over on downs, and ULL's final possession essentially ran out the clock; the Ragin' Cajuns won 16–3, a stark juxtaposition to the predictions, which envisioned a high-scoring affair.

=== Scoring summary ===
Scoring summary

Quarter	Time	Drive			Team	Scoring information	Score	
Quarter	Time	Plays	Yards	TOP	Team	Scoring information	NEV	ULL
1	11:26	8	77	3:34	ULL	C. J. Bates 17-yard touchdown reception from Terrance Broadway, Hunter Stover kick good	0	7
1	2:55	13	60	6:58	ULL	46-yard field goal by Hunter Stover	0	10
2	2:42	8	23	3:20	NEV	21-yard field goal by Brent Zuzo	3	10
4	11:51	15	77	7:25	ULL	30-yard field goal by Hunter Stover	3	13
4	4:46	9	47	4:15	ULL	35-yard field goal by Hunter Stover	3	16
"TOP" = time of possession. For other American football terms, see Glossary of American football.							3	16

=== Statistics ===
Statistics	NEV	ULL
First downs	13	26
Plays–yards	57–213	74–411
Rushes–yards	28–89	43–184
Passing yards	124	227
Passing: Comp–Att–Int	14–29–0	26–31–0
Time of possession	23:06	36:54
