= Alonzo Harris =

Alonzo Harris may refer to:

- Alonzo Harris (American football) (born 1992), American football player
- Detective Alonzo Harris, a fictional character in American crime thriller film Training Day
