= 2012 North Texas Mean Green football team =

American college football season

2012 North Texas Mean Green football
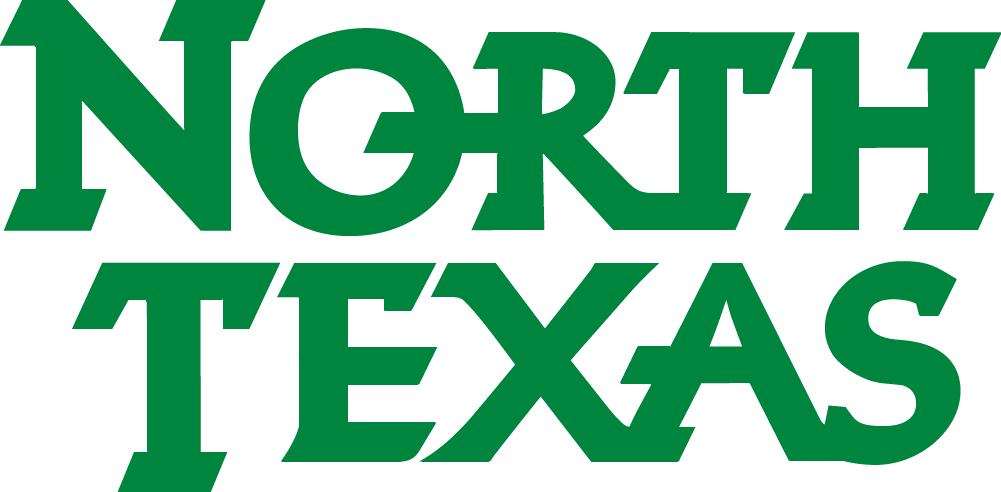
- Conference: Sun Belt Conference
- Record: 4–8 (3–5 Sun Belt)
- Head coach: Dan McCarney (2nd season)
- Offensive coordinator: Mike Canales (3rd season)
- Offensive scheme: Pro-style
- Defensive coordinator: John Skladany (1st season)
- Base defense: 4–3
- Home stadium: Apogee Stadium

2012 Sun Belt Conference football standings
	Conf.			Overall
Team	W		L	W		L
Arkansas State $	7	–	1	10	–	3
Louisiana–Monroe	6	–	2	8	–	5
Middle Tennessee	6	–	2	8	–	4
Louisiana–Lafayette *	4	–	2	5	–	4
Western Kentucky	4	–	4	7	–	6
Troy	3	–	5	5	–	7
North Texas	3	–	5	4	–	8
Florida Atlantic	2	–	6	3	–	9
FIU	2	–	6	3	–	9
South Alabama **	1	–	7	2	–	11
$ – Conference champion; * – Louisiana–Lafayette vacated 4 wins due to NCAA violations. ** – South Alabama was ineligible for the conference title or a bowl game as part of their transition to the FBS.

The 2012 North Texas Mean Green football team represented the University of North Texas as a member of the Sun Belt Conference during the 2012 NCAA Division I FBS football season. Led by second-year head coach Dan McCarney, the Mean Green compiled an overall record of 4–8 with a mark 3–5 in conference play, tying for sixth place in Sun Belt. The team played home games at Apogee Stadium in Denton, Texas.

After the completion of the 2011 season, McCarney focused on continuing the momentum created during the team's last game against the Middle Tennessee Blue Raiders. 25 players signed letters of intent to play for the Mean Green, and the team's spring practice ended with an intrasquad scrimmage. The team announced its schedule in March 2012, which included five opponents that were bowl eligible in 2011. The season opened with a road loss to the LSU Tigers and a home opening win against the Texas Southern Tigers. The team began conference play with a loss to the Troy Trojans. The season reached its zenith when the Mean Green defeated the Louisiana–Lafayette Ragin' Cajuns in a nationally televised game on October 16, but the team only won one of its remaining five games to finish with its eighth straight losing season.

This was the Mean Green's 12th and final season competing in the Sun Belt. North Texas joined Conference USA on July 1, 2013.

== Schedule ==
The North Texas announced the official football game schedule for 2012 on March 1, 2012. Five of the Mean Green's 12 opponents in 2012 participated in a bowl game the previous season. Sports analyst Phil Steele rated the schedule as the 79th toughest out of 124 teams in the NCAA Division I Football Bowl Subdivision (FBS).

Date	Time	Opponent	Site	TV	Result	Attendance
September 1	6:00 pm	at No. 3 LSU*	Tiger Stadium; Baton Rouge, LA	ESPNU	L 14–41	92,059
September 8	6:00 pm	Texas Southern*	Apogee Stadium; Denton, TX	TXA 21	W 34–7	22,259
September 15	6:00 pm	at No. 15 Kansas State*	Bill Snyder Family Football Stadium; Manhattan, KS	FSN	L 21–35	50,290
September 22	6:00 pm	Troy	Apogee Stadium; Denton, TX	ESPN3	L 7–14	21,823
September 29	4:00 pm	at Florida Atlantic	FAU Stadium; Boca Raton, FL	ESPN3	W 20–14	13,888
October 6	6:00 pm	at Houston*	Robertson Stadium; Houston, TX	CSS, CSNH	L 21–44	25,476
October 16	8:00 pm	Louisiana–Lafayette	Apogee Stadium; Denton, TX	ESPN2, ESPN3	W 30–23	17,055
October 27	3:30 pm	at Middle Tennessee	Johnny "Red" Floyd Stadium; Murfreesboro, TN	ESPN3	L 21–38	14,102
November 3	4:00 pm	Arkansas State^{†}	Apogee Stadium; Denton, TX		L 19–37	17,534
November 10	4:00 pm	South Alabama	Apogee Stadium; Denton, TX	TXA 21	W 24–14	15,963
November 17	3:00 pm	at Louisiana–Monroe	Malone Stadium; Monroe, LA		L 16–42	14,079
November 24	12:00 pm	at Western Kentucky	Houchens Industries–L. T. Smith Stadium; Bowling Green, KY	ESPN3	L 24–25	11,074
*Non-conference game; ^{†}Homecoming; Rankings from AP Poll released prior to the game; All times are in Central time

== Before the season ==
=== Spring practice ===
2012 Green vs. White spring football game

Team	1	2	3	4	Total
White	20	0	0	0	20
• Green	7	7	14	13	41

- Date: April 21
- Location: Apogee Stadium
  Denton, TX
- Game start: 2:00 p.m. CST

Spring practice began on March 28 and included 15 practices and an intrasquad scrimmage planned to avoid conflicts with classes. Head Coach Dan McCarney supervised the annual Green and White football game that concluded the spring football schedule on April 21. The 2012 match featured the first and third string members comprising the Green Team and the second and fourth string members comprising the White team.

The White team was given a 20-point lead at the start of the contest; they would be unable to score the rest of the game. Quarterback Derek Thompson threw six passes with four completions for 162 yards in the first half. Wide receivers Ivan Delgado and Brelan Chancellor combined for five catches and three touchdowns. Delgado finished with 2 receptions for 114 yards and 1 touchdown while Chancellor had three receptions for 100 yards and 2 touchdowns. Two rushes by running back Jeremy Brown for 52 and 25 yards gave the Green team the lead in the third quarter, bringing the score to 21–20. Ten minutes later, running back Antoinne Jackson rushed ten yards to increase the lead to 28–20. In the fourth quarter, Chancellor caught a 52-yard reception from quarterback Andrew McNulty. Antoinne Jimmerson ran 30 yards for his second rushing touchdown to make the final score 41–20.

== Game summaries ==
=== LSU ===
Team	1	2	3	4	Total
Mean Green	0	7	0	7	14
• Tigers	14	10	3	14	41

- Date: September 1
- Location: Tiger Stadium
  Baton Rouge, LA
- Game start: 6:02 p.m. CST
- Elapsed time: 3:30
- Game attendance: 92,059
- Game weather: 82°, possible thunderstorms, winds S 4–7 mph
- Referee: Tom Ritter
- TV announcers (ESPNU): Clay Matvick, Matt Stinchcomb, and Allison Williams

Scoring summary
1	12:30	LSU	Kenny Hilliard 38-yd run (Drew Alleman kick)	LSU 7–0
1	6:36	LSU	Odell Beckham 70 yd punt return (Drew Alleman kick)	LSU 14-0
2	14:56	LSU	Kenny Hilliard 5 yd run (Drew Alleman kick)	LSU 21-0
2	2:26	LSU	Drew Alleman 44-yd field goal	LSU 24-0
2	1:55	North Texas	Brelan Chancellor 80-yd pass from Derek Thompson (Zach Olen kick)	LSU 24-7
3	2:10	LSU	Drew Alleman 44-yd field goal	LSU 27-7
4	14:51	LSU	Kadron Boone 34-yd pass from Zach Mettenberger (Drew Alleman kick)	LSU 34-7
4	7:28	North Texas	Brelan Chancellor 15-yd pass from Derek Thompson (Zach Olen kick)	LSU 34-14
4	2:20	LSU	J.C. Copeland 5 yd run (Drew Alleman kick) (Drew Alleman kick)	LSU 34-7

The first game for the Mean Green's season was scheduled against the LSU Tigers football team, who had last played in the 2012 BCS National Championship Game against the 2011 Alabama Crimson Tide football team at the end of the 2011 season, losing 21–0. In the week before the game, concerns over the path and effects of Tropical Storm Isaac forced local officials in Louisiana to consider contingency plans for the game. Although the Tigers were forced to alter their practice schedule leading up to the game, the contest was held as scheduled in Tiger Stadium. The Mean Green's two scoring drives were capped by touchdown passes of 80 and 15 yards from quarterback Derek Thompson to wide receiver Brelan Chancellor. The Tigers' 508 yards of total offense led the team to a 41–14 victory over the Mean Green in the season opener.

=== Texas Southern ===
Team	1	2	3	4	Total
Tigers	0	0	7	0	7
• Mean Green	7	10	3	14	34

- Date: September 8
- Location: Apogee Stadium
  Denton, TX
- Game start: 6:00 p.m. CST
- Elapsed time: 3:18
- Game attendance: 22,259
- Game weather: 85°, clear, winds NE 13 mph
- Referee: Perry Havener
- TV announcers (TXA21): Dave Barnett and Doug Anderson

For their first home game of the 2012 season, the Mean Green defeated the Texas Southern University Tigers, a member of the Football Championship Subdivision (FCS) Southwestern Athletic Conference (SWAC) 34–7. The Tigers, who finished the 2011 season with a 4–7 record, were limited to 185 yards of total offense, while the Mean Green totaled 497 yards, most of which came from rushing. The game was the first home opening win for the Mean Green since the team defeated the SMU Mustangs football team during the 2006 season.

=== Kansas State ===
Team	1	2	3	4	Total
Mean Green	7	0	6	8	21
• Wildcats	7	7	7	14	35

- Location: Bill Snyder Family Football Stadium
  Manhattan, KS
- Game start: 6:05 p.m. CST
- Elapsed time: 3:06
- Game attendance: 50,290
- Game weather: 70°, cloudy, winds SE 5 mph
- Referee: Charles Lewis
- TV announcers (FSN): Mike Morgan, J. C. Pearson, and Laura McKeeman

Scoring summary
1	4:00	North Texas	Brelan Chancellor 6-yd run (Zach Olen kick)	North Texas 7–0
1	3:47	Kansas State	Tyler Lockett Tyler 96-yd kickoff return (A. Cantele kick)	7-7
2	2:24	Kansas State	T. Thompson 38-yd pass from Collin Klein (A. Cantele kick)	Kansas State 14-7
3	7:03	North Texas	A. Jimmerson 1-yd run (Zach Olen kick failed)	Kansas State 14-13
3	3:15	Kansas State	T. Thompson 21-yd pass from Collin Klein (A. Cantele kick)	Kansas State 21-13
4	13:20	Kansas State	John Hubert 6-yd run (A. Cantele kick)	Kansas State 28-13
4	6:44	Kansas State	Collin Klein 1-yd run (A. Cantele kick)	Kansas State 35-13
4	2:31	North Texas	Brelan Chancellor 19-yd pass from Derek Thompson (Brandin Byrd pass from Derek Thompson)	Kansas State 35-21

For their next road game, the Mean Green played the Kansas State Wildcats, led by potential Heisman Trophy candidate Collin Klein. The two teams had last met during the 2010 season, when the Wildcats defeated the Mean Green 41–49 in the final game at Fouts Field. This time playing at Bill Snyder Family Football Stadium, the Wildcats were favored to win by 28 points by spread bettors prior to the game. Each team scored two touchdowns by midway through the third quarter, but a blocked extra point attempt after North Texas' second score made the score 14–13. Kansas State answered with three unanswered touchdowns in the third and fourth quarter, bringing the score to 35-13 before North Texas scored its final touchdown with 2:31 left in the game. The final score was 35–13 in favor of the Wildcats. Mean Green quarterback Derek Thompson completed 25 of 28 passes in the game.

=== Troy ===
Team	1	2	3	4	Total
• Trojans	0	7	7	0	14
Mean Green	7	0	0	0	7

- Location: Apogee Stadium
  Denton, TX
- Game start: 6:05 p.m. CST
- Elapsed time: 3:05
- Game attendance: 21,823
- Game weather: 96°, clear, winds SW 6 mph
- Referee: Jeff Hilyer
- TV announcers (ESPN3): Jonathan Yardley and Stan Lewter

Scoring summary
1	5:24	North Texas	Brelan Chancellor 50-yd pass from Derek Thompson (Zach Olen kick)	North Texas 7–0
2	1:00	Troy	Jaquon Robinson 15-yard pass from Corey Robinson (Will Scott kick)	7-7
3	6:53	Troy	Chip Reeves 76-yard pass from Corey Robinson (Will Scott kick)	Troy 14–7

For their first conference game of the season, the Mean Green faced the Troy Trojans, whom they had defeated the previous year 38–33. North Texas' defensive squad showed significant improvement, slowing a Troy offense led by Corey Robinson that had averaged over 500 yards a game to only two touchdowns. On offense, however, the team struggled to score points despite moving the ball. The Mean Green gained 422 yards of total offense, but kicker Zach Olen missed three field goals and quarterback Derek Thompson completed only 12 of 28 passes for 238 yards and one touchdown. The loss brought the Mean Green's season record to 1–3.

=== Florida Atlantic ===
Team	1	2	3	4	Total
• Mean Green	7	3	7	3	20
Owls	0	0	7	7	14

- Date: September 29
- Location: FAU Stadium
  Boca Raton, FL
- Game start: 5:00 p.m. EST
- Elapsed time: 3:04
- Game attendance: 13,888
- Game weather: Sunny, winds 83° SE 9MPH
- Referee: Riley Johnson
- TV announcers (ESPN3): Shawn Kenney and John Bunting

Scoring summary
1	6:20	North Texas	Brelan Chancellor 68-yd pass from Derek Thompson (Zach Olen kick)	North Texas 7–0
2	12:15	North Texas	Zach Olen 48-yd field goal	North Texas 10–0
3	5:24	North Texas	Drew Miller 14-yd pass from Derek Thompson (Zach Olen kick)	North Texas 17–0
3	:59	FAU	Damian Fortner 11-yd run (Mitch Anderson kick)	North Texas 17–7
4	14:47	FAU	Graham Wilbert 11-yd run (Mitch Anderson kick)	North Texas 17–14
4	7:29	North Texas	Zach Olen 28-yd field goal	North Texas 20–14

The Mean Green eked out a victory against first-year head coach Carl Pelini and the Florida Atlantic Owls at FAU Stadium, giving the team a 2–3 record through five games, its best start since the 2005 season. After North Texas gained a 17–0 lead midway through the third quarter, Florida Atlantic scored two straight touchdowns in less than two minutes of game time to bring the score to 17–14. Midway through the fourth quarter, Mean Green kicker Zach Olen made a 28-yard field goal to bring the score to 20–14. North Texas held on to the lead, which was one point short of the points spread predicted prior to the beginning of the game. The Mean Green gained 56 rushing yards against an Owl defense that had allowed an average of 255 yards per game coming into the contest.

=== Houston ===
Team	1	2	3	4	Total
Mean Green	0	14	7	0	21
• Cougars	17	14	10	3	44

- Date: October 6
- Location: Robertson Stadium
  Houston, TX
- Game start: 6:06 pm CST
- Elapsed time: 3:07
- Game attendance: 25,476
- Game weather: 83°, partly cloudy, humid, winds NE 9MPH
- Referee: Tony Backert
- Television network: CSS

The Mean Green faced the Cougars for the second time in as many years when they traveled to Houston for their final nonconference game of the season. Although Cougars lost their first game of the season to the Texas State Bobcats, the team's prolific offensive unit had recovered somewhat by the time they played the Louisiana Tech Bulldogs on September 8. In that game, the teams combined for a total of 209 plays, breaking an NCAA FBS record held by the Mean Green and the San Jose State Spartans since 1971. The Cougars scored two touchdowns and a field goal to earn a 17-point lead before the Mean Green scored its first points in the second quarter. Houston running back Charles Sims ran for a career-high 210 yards, and the Cougars won the contest with a score of 44–21.

=== Louisiana Lafayette ===
Team	1	2	3	4	Total
Rajin' Cajuns	6	7	7	3	23
• Mean Green	0	6	14	10	30

- Date: October 16
- Location: Apogee Stadium
  Denton, TX
- Game start: 8:00 p.m. CST
- Elapsed time: 3:36
- Game attendance: 17,055
- Game weather: 72°, clear, winds SE 13 mph
- Referee: Riley Johnson
- TV announcers (ESPN2): Andre Ware and Dave Neal

Scoring summary
1	5:37	Louisiana–Lafayette	Effrem Reed 1-yd run (extra point missed)	Louisiana–Lafayette 6–0
2	7:08	North Texas	Zach Olen 25-yd field goal	Louisiana–Lafayette 6–3
2	6:53	Louisiana–Lafayette	Terra Broadway 75-yd run (Brett Baer kick)	Louisiana–Lafayette 13–3
2	:52	North Texas	Zach Olen 24-yd field goal	Louisiana–Lafayette 13–6
3	12:35	Louisiana–Lafayette	Harry Peoples 10-yd pass from Terra Broadway (Brett Baer kick)	Louisiana–Lafayette 20–6
3	5:04	North Texas	A. Jimmerson 28-yd pass from Derek Thompson (Zach Olen kick)	Louisiana–Lafayette 20–13
3	3:42	North Texas	B. Chancellor 34-yd run (Zach Olen kick)	20–20
4	11:44	North Texas	Zach Olen 22-yd field goal	North Texas 20–23
4	3:01	Louisiana–Lafayette	Brett Baer 47-yd field goal	23–23
4	1:54	North Texas	A. Jimmerson 78-yd pass from Derek Thompson (Zach Olen kick)	North Texas 30–23

The Mean Green's Tuesday evening home game against the Louisiana–Lafayette Ragin' Cajuns began at 8:00 p.m. in Denton. Louisiana scored first, and had gained a 20–6 lead by the middle of the third quarter. After North Texas scored two touchdowns and a field goal, followed by a field goal from the Ragin' Cajuns, the score was tied at 23–23. With 1:54 remaining in the game at their own 22-yard line, North Texas quarterback Derek Thompson threw a screen pass to running back Antoinne Jimmerson, who ran 78 yards for the game-winning touchdown. On the ensuing drive, Ragin' Cajun running back Effrem Reed fumbled the ball, which was recovered by North Texas. The Mean Green ran out the clock to win the contest. The game was televised on ESPN2. The broadcast had an estimated 366,000 viewers, earning a Nielsen rating of 0.3.

=== Middle Tennessee ===
Team	1	2	3	4	Total
Mean Green	0	0	14	7	21
• Blue Raiders	17	7	14	0	38

- Date: October 27
- Location: Floyd Stadium
  Murfreesboro, Tennessee
- Game start: 2:32 p.m. EST
- Elapsed time: 2:44
- Game attendance: 14,102
- Game weather: 49°, Gray and dreary, winds N 14 mph
- Referee: Tony Backert
- Television network: ESPN3

Scoring summary
1	9:18	Middle Tennessee	Anthony Amos 18-yd pass from Logan Kilgore (Carlos Lopez kick)	Middle Tennessee 7–0
1	6:38	Middle Tennessee	Kyle Griswould 72-yd pass from Logan Kilgore (Carlos Lopez kick)	Middle Tennessee 14–0
1	1:13	Middle Tennessee	Carlos Lopez 21-yd field goal	Middle Tennessee 17–0
2	2:42	Middle Tennessee	Kyle Griswould 49-yd pass from Logan Kilgore (Carlos Lopez kick)	Middle Tennessee 24–0
3	13:48	Middle Tennessee	Jordan Parker 4-yd run (Carlos Lopez kick)	Middle Tennessee 31–0
3	10:20	North Texas	Antoinne Jimmerson 2-yd run (Zach Olen kick)	Middle Tennessee 31–7
3	9:27	Middle Tennessee	Logan Kilgore 45-yd run (Carlos Lopez kick)	Middle Tennessee 38–7
3	1:26	North Texas	Carlos Harris 13-yd pass from Derek Thompson (Zach Olen kick)	Middle Tennessee 38–14
4	6:38	North Texas	Antoinne Jimmerson 15-yd run (Zach Olen kick)	Middle Tennessee 38–21

The Mean Green struggled on both sides of the ball against the Middle Tennessee Blue Raiders. Although the Mean Green gained 432 total yards with a balanced running and passing offense, it did not score any points until running back Antoinne Jimmerson ran two yards for a touchdown in the third quarter. By that time, the Blue Raiders had already scored 31 points, making the game out of reach for the Mean Green. Wide receiver Brelan Chancellor broke a collar bone in the first quarter of the game, and would miss the rest of the season.

=== Arkansas State ===
Team	1	2	3	4	Total
• Red Wolves	10	20	7	0	37
Mean Green	9	3	7	0	19

- Date: November 3
- Location: Apogee Stadium
  Denton, TX
- Game start: 4:00 p.m. CST
- Elapsed time: 3:02
- Game attendance: 17,534
- Game weather: 79°, clear, winds N 7 mph
- Referee: Kevin Stine

=== South Alabama ===
Team	1	2	3	4	Total
Jaguars	7	7	0	0	14
• Mean Green	0	14	10	0	24

- Date: November 10
- Location: Apogee Stadium
  Denton, TX
- Game start: 4:05 p.m. CST
- Elapsed time: 3:09
- Game attendance: 15,963
- Game weather: 80°, partly cloudy, winds S 26 mph
- Referee: Tony Backert
- TV announcers (TXA 21): Dave Barnett

Scoring summary
1	5:18	South Alabama	Kendall Houston 1-yd run (Michel Chapuseaux kick)	South Alabama 7–0
2	14:41	North Texas	Jeremy Brown 51-yd run (Zach Olen kick)	7–7
2	5:18	South Alabama	Jereme Jones 13-yd pass from Ross Metheny (Michel Chapuseaux kick)	South Alabama 14–7
2	:17	North Texas	Drew Miller 2-yd pass from Derek Thompson (Zach Olen kick)	14–14
3	9:32	North Texas	Brandin Byrd 82-yd run (Zach Olen kick)	North Texas 21–14
3	5:37	North Texas	Zach Olen 33-yd field goal	North Texas 24–14

=== Louisiana Monroe ===
Team	1	2	3	4	Total
Mean Green	0	3	7	6	16
• Warhawks	7	7	7	21	42

- Date: November 17
- Location: Malone Stadium
  Monroe, LA
- Game start: 3:00 p.m. CST
- Elapsed time: 3:02
- Game attendance: 14,079
- Game weather: 67°, clear, winds NE 8 mph
- Referee: Kevin Stine

Scoring summary
1	5:59	ULM	Kolton Browning 1-yd run (Justin Manton kick)	ULM 7–0
2	7:30	North Texas	Zach Olen 29-yd field goal	ULM 7–3
2	1:19	ULM	Brent Leonard 7-yd pass from Kolton Browning (Justin Manton kick)	ULM 14–3
3	8:28	ULM	Mitchell Bailey 7-yd run (Justin Manton kick)	ULM 21–3
3	5:09	North Texas	Andrew Power 4-yd pass from Derek Thompson (Zach Olen kick)	ULM 21–10
4	13:36	ULM	Je'Ron Hamm 24-yd pass from Kolton Browning (Justin Manton kick)	ULM 28–10
4	6:57	ULM	Je'Ron Hamm 61-yd pass from Kolton Browning (Justin Manton kick)	ULM 35–10
4	3:01	North Texas	Darnell Smith 15-yd pass from Derek Thompson (2-pt pass conversion failed)	ULM 35–16
4	2:45	ULM	Darrell McNeal 54-yd run (Justin Manton kick)	ULM 42–16

=== Western Kentucky ===
Team	1	2	3	4	Total
Mean Green	7	10	7	0	24
• Hilltoppers	7	3	0	15	25

- Date: November 24
- Location: Houchens Industries–L. T. Smith Stadium
  Bowling Green, Kentucky
- Game start: 12:00 p.m. CST
- Elapsed time: 3:12
- Game attendance: 11,074
- Game weather: 31°, light snow
- Referee: Jeff Hilyer
- TV announcers (ESPN3): Tom Dore, Cole Cubelic, Barbara Jordan

Scoring summary
1	5:03	WKU	Jack Doyle 4-yd pass from Kawaun Jakes (Garrett Schwettman kick)	WKU 7–0
1	3:37	North Texas	Brandin Byrd 61-yd run (Zach Olen kick)	7–7
2	10:16	North Texas	Jeremy Brown 20-yd run (Zach Olen kick)	North Texas 14–7
2	7:09	North Texas	Zach Olen 22-yd field goal	North Texas 17–7
2	:45	WKU	Garrett Schwettman 39-yd field goal	North Texas 17–10
3	:24	North Texas	Darnell Smith 12-yd pass from Derek Thompson (Zach Olen kick)	North Texas 24–10
4	12:44	WKU	Jonathan Dowling 39-yd interception return (Two-point pass conversion failed)	North Texas 24–16
4	7:10	WKU	Garrett Schwettman 27-yd field goal	North Texas 24–19
4	3:30	WKU	Antonio Andrews 21-yd run (Two-point conversion failed)	WKU 25–24

== Personnel ==
=== Roster ===
2012 North Texas Mean Green football team roster
Players
Coaches
Offense

Pos.	#	Name	Class
QB	19	John Dodson	Sr
QB	15	Andrew McNulty	So
QB	11	Brett Osborn	Jr
QB	7	Derek Thompson (C)	Jr
RB	20	Jeremy Brown	Sr
RB	24	Brandin Byrd	Jr
RB	22	Antoinne Jimmerson	Fr
RB	38	Bryan Monroe	Jr
RB	39	Konockus Sashington	So
RB	23	Zac Whitfield	Fr
RB	26	Dimitri Wilhite	Jr
TE	92	Raymond Burks	So
TE	8	Cooper Jones	Fr
TE	86	Drew Miller	Jr
TE	1	Andrew Power	Sr
TE	89	Daniel Prior	Sr
TE	84	Marcus Smith	Fr
TE	88	Tanner Smith	So
WR	81	Christopher Bynes	Sr
WR	34	Carl Caldwell	So
WR	3	Brelean Chancellor	Jr
WR	10	Ivan Delgado	Sr
WR	17	Lynrick Pleasant	Jr
WR	14	Chaz Sampson	Fr
WR	16	Derrick Teegarden	So
OL	64	LaChris Aniyam	Jr
OL	77	Travis Ellard	Fr
OL	70	Coleman Freely	Sr
OL	74	Cam Feldt	So
OL	60	Aaron Fortenberry (C)	Sr
OL	71	Antonio Johnson	So
OL	62	Cyril Lemon	So
OL	68	Grant Shaw	Fr
OL	63	Nicolas Summerfield	Sr
OL	65	Micah Thompson	So
OL	57	Mason Y'Barbo	So

Defense

Pos.	#	Name	Class
DB	19	Brandon Allen	Fr
DB	31	Kenny Buyers	Fr
DB	46	Willie Hubbard	Fr
DB	37	Josepg Igboeli	Jr
DB	6	Hilbert Jackson	Jr
DB	2	D. Q. Johnson	Jr
DB	27	Lairamie Lee	So
DB	17	Kevin Maduka	Sr
DB	15	Mike Marshall	So
DB	8	Marcus Trice	Jr
DB	21	Freddie Warner	So
DE	44	Aaron Bellazin	Jr
DE	95	Alexander Lincoln	So
DE	49	Daryl Mason	So
DE	93	Brandon McCoy (C)	Jr
DE	48	K. C. Obi	Sr
DE	91	Austin Orr	Fr
DT	97	Richard Abbe	Jr
DT	69	Joe Astorga	Fr
DT	90	Ryan Boutwell	Jr
DT	96	Tevinn Cantly	Sr
LB	52	Derek Akunne	So
LB	38	Brendan Campbell	Fr
LB	36	Brandon Davis	Fr
LB	54	Blake Dunham	So
LB	50	Robert Lewis	Jr
LB	59	Jarrod Lynn	Fr
LB	35	Zachary Orr (C)	Jr
LB	45	Jeremy Phillips	Sr
LB	42	Chad Polk	Fr
LB	13	Michael Stojkovic	So
LB	53	Kendall Washington	Fr
LB	11	Will Wright	Jr

Special teams

Pos.	#	Name	Class
P	41	Will Atterberry	Sr
PK	37	Zach Olen	Jr

Head coach

- Dan McCarney (Iowa)

Coordinators/assistant coaches

- Mike Canales (Utah State)
  Offensive coordinator/quarterbacks
- John Skladany (Ohio)
  Defensive coordinator
- Justin Gaines (Montana)
  Cornerbacks
- Mike Grant (Nebraska)
  Running backs
- Noah Joseph (Drake)
  Safeties
- Mike Nelson (Dayton)
  Defensive line
- Nick Quartaro (Xavier)
  Asst. head coach/Wide Receivers
- Kent Riddle (Oregon State)
  Special teams/tight ends
- Mike Simmonds (Indiana State)
  Offensive line
- Travis Bell (Arizona)
  Tight ends
- Sadiq Muhammed (Kansas)
  Linebackers
- Scotty Conley (Texas A&M)
  Director of football operations/recruiting coordinator
- Frank Wintrich (Kentucky Wesleyan)
  Strength coach

Legend

- (C) Team captain
- (S) Suspended
- (I) Ineligible
- Injured
- Redshirt

=== Recruiting class ===
25 players signed letters of intent to begin playing for North Texas in 2012.

College recruiting information
Name	Hometown	School	Height	Weight	Commit date
David Busby; DB	Coppell, TX	Coppell	5 ft 11 in (1.80 m)	180 lb (82 kg)	Jan 27, 2012
David Busby; DB	Recruit ratings: Scout: Rivals: (75)				
Dustin Clark; OLB	Borger, TX	Borger	6 ft 0 in (1.83 m)	200 lb (91 kg)	Dec 17, 2011
Dustin Clark; OLB	Recruit ratings: Scout: Rivals: (NR)				
Devante Davis; DB	Baton Rouge, LA	Woodlawn	5 ft 11 in (1.80 m)	180 lb (82 kg)	Feb 1, 2012
Devante Davis; DB	Recruit ratings: Scout: Rivals: (76)				
Malik Dialonga; DE	Cedar Hill, TX	Trinity Christian	6 ft 4 in (1.93 m)	243 lb (110 kg)	Jul 20, 2011
Malik Dialonga; DE	Recruit ratings: Scout: Rivals: (75)				
Boone Feldt; OL	Buda, TX	Hays	6 ft 3 in (1.91 m)	275 lb (125 kg)	Jul 31, 2011
Boone Feldt; OL	Recruit ratings: Scout: Rivals: (77)				
Cam Feldt; OT	Pilot Point, TX	Arkansas	6 ft 5 in (1.96 m)	338 lb (153 kg)	Feb 1, 2012
Cam Feldt; OT	Recruit ratings: (TR)				
Mustafa Haboul; DT	Arlington, TX	Martin	6 ft 2 in (1.88 m)	240 lb (110 kg)	Jan 31, 2012
Mustafa Haboul; DT	Recruit ratings: Scout: Rivals: (NR)				
Carlos Harris; RB	Frisco, TX	Frisco	5 ft 7 in (1.70 m)	152 lb (69 kg)	Feb 1, 2012
Carlos Harris; RB	Recruit ratings: Scout: Rivals: (NR)				
Brad Horton; DE	Denton, TX	Liberty Christian	6 ft 5 in (1.96 m)	225 lb (102 kg)	Sep 12, 2011
Brad Horton; DE	Recruit ratings: Scout: Rivals: (73)				
Jamarcus Jarvis; RB	Houma, LA	East Ascension	5 ft 10 in (1.78 m)	195 lb (88 kg)	Feb 1, 2012
Jamarcus Jarvis; RB	Recruit ratings: Scout: Rivals: (NR)				
D. Q. Johnson; CB	Council Bluffs, IA	Iowa Western CC	5 ft 11 in (1.80 m)	185 lb (84 kg)	Jan 12, 2012
D. Q. Johnson; CB	Recruit ratings: Scout: Rivals: (JC)				
Xavier Kelly; CB	Houston, TX	Mayde Creek	5 ft 11 in (1.80 m)	165 lb (75 kg)	Oct 27, 2011
Xavier Kelly; CB	Recruit ratings: Scout: Rivals: (72)				
Rodrick Lancaster; WR	Dallas, TX	Life School (Oak Cliff)	6 ft 1 in (1.85 m)	189 lb (86 kg)	Jun 20, 2011
Rodrick Lancaster; WR	Recruit ratings: Scout: Rivals: (NR)				
Mark Lewis; RB	Livonia, LA	Livonia	5 ft 11 in (1.80 m)	205 lb (93 kg)	Feb 1, 2012
Mark Lewis; RB	Recruit ratings: Scout: Rivals: (75)				
Jamal Marshall; S	Missouri City, TX	Elkins	6 ft 3 in (1.91 m)	185 lb (84 kg)	Jan 31, 2012
Jamal Marshall; S	Recruit ratings: Scout: Rivals: (NR)				
Dylan McDorman; DT	Wichita Falls, TX	East Ascension	6 ft 2 in (1.88 m)	300 lb (140 kg)	Oct 7, 2011
Dylan McDorman; DT	Recruit ratings: Scout: Rivals: (NR)				
Ryan Rentfro; OG	Flower Mound, TX	Flower Mound Marcus	6 ft 4 in (1.93 m)	280 lb (130 kg)	Feb 1, 2012
Ryan Rentfro; OG	Recruit ratings: Scout: Rivals: (NR)				
Jarrian Roberts; ILB	Clarksville, TX	Clarksville	6 ft 2 in (1.88 m)	220 lb (100 kg)	Sep 1, 2011
Jarrian Roberts; ILB	Recruit ratings: Scout: Rivals: (NR)				
Rex Rollins; RB	Tyler, TX	Chapel Hill	6 ft 0 in (1.83 m)	185 lb (84 kg)	Jul 3, 2011
Rex Rollins; RB	Recruit ratings: Scout: Rivals: (NR)				
Nick Schrapps; WR	Beaumont, TX	Monsignor Kelly Catholic	6 ft 1 in (1.85 m)	200 lb (91 kg)	Sep 1, 2011
Nick Schrapps; WR	Recruit ratings: Scout: Rivals: (72)				
LaJaylin Smith; OLB	Laplace, LA	East Ascension	6 ft 0 in (1.83 m)	218 lb (99 kg)	Feb 1, 2012
LaJaylin Smith; OLB	Recruit ratings: Scout: Rivals: (NR)				
Marcus Trice; CB	Norman, OK	Oklahoma	5 ft 8 in (1.73 m)	190 lb (86 kg)	Feb 1, 2012
Marcus Trice; CB	Recruit ratings: Scout: Rivals: (TR)				
Connor Trussell; OT	Arlington, TX	James Martin	6 ft 5 in (1.96 m)	275 lb (125 kg)	Jan 28, 2012
Connor Trussell; OT	Recruit ratings: Scout: Rivals: (NR)				
Sir Calvin Wallace; DT	Tyler, TX	Chapel Hill	6 ft 2 in (1.88 m)	300 lb (140 kg)	Jul 5, 2011
Sir Calvin Wallace; DT	Recruit ratings: Scout: Rivals: (NR)				
Dutton Watson; DE	Midland, TX	Midland Christian	6 ft 3 in (1.91 m)	240 lb (110 kg)	Feb 1, 2012
Dutton Watson; DE	Recruit ratings: Scout: Rivals: (NR)				
Overall recruit ranking: Scout: t109 Rivals: t100 ESPN: Not Ranked Top 25
Note: In many cases, Scout, Rivals, 247Sports, On3, and ESPN may conflict in their listings of height and weight.; In these cases, the average was taken. ESPN grades are on a 100-point scale.; Sources: "North Texas 2012 Football Commitments". Rivals.; "2012 North Texas Football Commits". Scout.; "2012 Player Commits". ESPN.; "Scout.com Team Recruiting Rankings". Scout.; "2012 Team Ranking". Rivals.com.

== Media ==
All North Texas football games aired via the Mean Green Radio Network, with George Dunham providing play-by-play action and Hank Dickenson providing analysis. Mean Green Radio Network coverage was carried on KNTU 88.1 FM in Denton and on KHYI 95.3 FM in the Dallas–Fort Worth metroplex. 2012 was the first year KHYI provided Mean Green football coverage. Both stations also streamed live online.
