= 2012 New Orleans Bowl =

2012 R+L Carriers New Orleans Bowl
East Carolina Pirates	Louisiana–Lafayette Ragin' Cajuns
(8–4)	(8–4)
C-USA	Sun Belt
34	43
Head coach: Ruffin McNeill	Head coach: Mark Hudspeth
	1	2	3	4	Total
East Carolina	0	21	10	3	34
Louisiana–Lafayette	7	24	6	6	43
- Date: December 22, 2012
- Season: 2012
- Stadium: Mercedes-Benz Superdome
- Location: New Orleans, Louisiana
- MVP: Terrance Broadway, Louisiana–Lafayette
- Favorite: Louisiana–Lafayette by 5
- Referee: Clair Gausman (WAC)
- Attendance: 48,828

United States TV coverage
- Network: ESPN
- Announcers: Beth Mowins (Play-by-Play); Joey Galloway (Color Commentator); Quint Kessenich (Sideline Reporter)
- Nielsen ratings: 1.79

The 2012 R+L Carriers New Orleans Bowl was a post-season American college football bowl game held on December 22, 2012, at the Mercedes-Benz Superdome in New Orleans, Louisiana. The 12th edition of the New Orleans Bowl began at 11:00 a.m. CST and aired on ESPN. It featured the East Carolina Pirates from Conference USA against the Louisiana–Lafayette Ragin' Cajuns from the Sun Belt Conference and was the final game of the 2012 NCAA Division I FBS football season for both teams. The Ragin' Cajuns accepted their invitation after earning an 8–4 record in the regular season, while the Pirates advanced to the game through the C-USA's contingency plan after earning an 8–4 record.

The 77 combined points scored by both teams set a New Orleans Bowl record.

== Teams ==
Since 2002, the New Orleans Bowl has had its current setup with a team from Conference USA playing a team from the Sun Belt Conference.

This was the eleventh meeting between the two teams. Louisiana–Lafayette leads the all-time record 6-4. The last time they played was in 1990.

=== East Carolina ===
The Pirates continued their winning history in Conference USA, becoming the East Division co-champions with a 7-1 conference record (though losing the championship game tiebreaker through their only conference loss to the UCF Knights). After said Knights lost the Tulsa Golden Hurricane in the 2012 Conference USA Football Championship Game, the conference's corresponding contingency plan for the 2012–13 NCAA Bowl season put the Pirates in the 2012 New Orleans Bowl.

This will be the Pirates' first-ever New Orleans Bowl.

=== Louisiana–Lafayette ===
The Ragin' Cajuns are the defending New Orleans Bowl champions, and their road to this year's game is similar to the previous year's. Although the Sun Belt has a record five bowl-eligible teams this year, the Ragin' Cajuns stood out amidst the competition by compiling a 5-2 conference record, including victories over fellow bowl-eligible teams the Louisiana-Monroe Warhawks and the Western Kentucky Hilltoppers. After defeating the South Alabama Jaguars to improve their regular-season record to 7-4, the Ragin' Cajuns accepted the fifth invitation of the 2012–13 NCAA Bowl season to the 2012 New Orleans Bowl.

== Game summary ==
=== Scoring summary ===
Scoring summary

Quarter	Time	Drive			Team	Scoring information	Score	
Quarter	Time	Plays	Yards	TOP	Team	Scoring information	East Carolina	Louisiana–Lafayette
1	8:10	12	73	4:59	ULL	Terrance Broadway 12-yard touchdown run, Brett Baer kick good	0	7
2	14:17	10	70	3:52	ULL	Harry Peoples 10-yard touchdown run, Brett Baer kick good	0	14
2	12:48	5	77	1:29	ECU	Reggie Bullock 5-yard touchdown run, Warren Harvey kick good	7	14
2	11:07	5	71	1:41	ULL	Alonzo Harris 6-yard touchdown run, Brett Baer kick good	7	21
2	7:05	5	98	1:52	ULL	Alonzo Harris 68-yard touchdown run, Brett Baer kick good	7	28
2	3:09	10	80	3:56	ECU	Justin Hardy 19-yard touchdown reception from Shane Carden, Warren Harvey kick good	14	28
2	2:56	1	16	0:13	ECU	Danny Webster 16-yard touchdown reception from Shane Carden, Warren Harvey kick good	21	28
2	0:00	5	47	0:37	ULL	50-yard field goal by Brett Baer	21	31
3	9:46	12	54	4:16	ECU	45-yard field goal by Warren Harvey	24	31
3	5:57	7	60	2:19	ECU	Reggie Bullock 13-yard touchdown run, Warren Harvey kick good	31	31
3	3:07	7	76	2:50	ULL	Javone Lawson 14-yard touchdown reception from Terrance Broadway, Brett Baer kick blocked	31	37
4	13:36	12	70	4:31	ECU	26-yard field goal by Warren Harvey	34	37
4	3:11	11	77	5:01	ULL	25-yard field goal by Brett Baer	34	40
4	0:10	5	8	2:22	ULL	40-yard field goal by Brett Baer	34	43
"TOP" = time of possession. For other American football terms, see Glossary of American football.								

=== Statistics ===
Statistics	ECU	ULL
First downs	23	25
Total offense, plays - yards	73-421	77-591
Rushes-yards (net)	30-143	42-267
Passing yards (net)	278	324
Passes, Comp-Att-Int	25-43-1	22-35-1
Time of Possession	27:18	32:42
