= Winston Academy =

Segregation academy in Mississippi

Location
- 545 Richardson Road; Louisville, Mississippi 39339; United States; 33.1400°N 89.0344°W

Information
- Type: Private
- Established: 1969
- Founders: Segregationists
- Colors: Red and Blue
- Nickname: Patriots
- Website: http://www.winstonpatriots.org/

Winston Academy is a private college preparatory school in Louisville, Mississippi. It was founded in 1969 as a segregation academy.

== History ==
When the Federal government enforced school integration, many white parents sought ways to keep their children from attending integrated schools. Winston Academy was founded in 1969 to provide white children a segregated education.

In 1969, the Louisville-Winston Educational Foundation voted to establish the school after receiving a report on the "public school situation facing our country". Foundation president David Richardson told a crowd of 300 citizens gathered at the county courthouse that "The only choice open to parents who want their children to continue to receive a high caliber education is to support a private school system in Winston County."

In the fall of 1970, the school stopped holding classes in local churches and moved into its permanent campus.

== Demographics ==
Although the school posts a non-discrimination policy on their website, as of 2012, the student population was over 99% white.

== Athletics ==
Winston Academy competes under the nickname Patriots within the Midsouth Association of Independent Schools.

== Notable alumni ==
- Andy Kennedy, Head Men’s Basketball Coach, University of Alabama-Birmingham Blazers
- Mark Hudspeth, former Mississippi State Football Coach and Former ULL Head Coach. Served as head football coach at WA from 1996 to 1997.
- Matthew Mitchell, Head Women’s basketball coach, University of Houston Lady Cougars
- Kim Rosamond, Head Women's basketball coach, Tennessee Tech University Golden Eagles
- Taylor McNeel, United States District Judge for the state of Mississippi
