= Reed Stringer =

American football coach (born 1979)

Current position
- Title: General manager
- Team: Southern Miss
- Conference: Sun Belt

Biographical details
- Born: January 26, 1979 (age 47); Canton, Mississippi, U.S.
- Education: Delta State University (2001, 2003)

Playing career
- 1998–2001: Delta State
- Position: Offensive tackle

Coaching career (HC unless noted)
- 2002: Delta State (GA)
- 2003–2004: Mississippi State (GA)
- 2005–2006: Mississippi State (TE)
- 2007–2008: Mississippi State (TE/ST)
- 2011–2017: Louisiana (AHC/TE/RC)
- 2018: Southern Miss (OQC)
- 2019: Southern Miss (TE)
- 2020: Southern Miss (ST/TE)
- 2021–2024: Southern Miss (AHC)
- 2024: Southern Miss (interim HC)

Administrative career (AD unless noted)
- 2009: Mississippi State (dir. of recruiting)
- 2010: Clemson (Player development)
- 2021–present: Southern Miss (GM)

Head coaching record
- Overall: 0–5
- Bowls: 0–0

Accomplishments and honors

Awards
- As a player: NCAA Division II national champion (2000)

Reed Stringer (born January 26, 1979) is an American college football coach currently serving as the general manager for the University of Southern Mississippi, a position he has held since 2021. He served as the interim head football coach in 2024. Before becoming interim head coach in October 2024, he had served in various capacities at Southern Miss since 2018.

== Career ==
Stringer grew up in Canton, Mississippi, and attended the Canton Academy, where he played football and basketball. Stringer played offensive tackle at Delta State from 1998–2001. The 1998 and 2000 teams won the Gulf South Conference; the 2000 team won the Division II national championship. Stringer was a graduate assistant at Mississippi State in 2003 under head coach Jackie Sherrill, and was retained when Sylvester Croom succeeded Sherrill for the 2004 season. Croom promoted Stringer to tight ends coach, his first on-field role, in 2005.

New Louisiana-Lafayette head coach Mark Hudspeth hired Stringer as tight ends coach and recruiting coordinator in 2011. Stringer and Hudspeth first met when Stringer was a tackle at Delta State and Hudspeth was offensive coordinator there (1999–2000). They overlapped again at Mississippi State in 2009. Stringer remained at Louisiana-Lafayette until the end of the 2017 season when Hudspeth was fired.

For the 2018 season, Stringer joined Jay Hopson's staff at Southern Miss as a quality control coach. He succeeded Brock Hays as tight ends coach in 2019. Stringer remained at Southern Miss during a chaotic 2020 season in which Southern Miss had three coaches: Hopson, Scotty Walden, Tim Billings. New permanent head coach Will Hall, hired for the 2021 season, retained Stringer and promoted him to assistant head coach and general manager. Southern Miss fired Hall seven games into the 2024 season and named Stringer the interim head coach.

== Head coaching record ==
Year	Team	Overall	Conference	Standing	Bowl/playoffs	Coaches^{#}	AP^{°}
Southern Miss Golden Eagles (Sun Belt Conference) (2024)
2024	Southern Miss	0–5 (Note: Stringer became interim head coach after Will Hall's firing following week 7.)	0–5	7th (West)			
Southern Miss:		0–5	0–5				
Total:		0–5					
^{#}Rankings from final Coaches Poll.; ^{°}Rankings from final AP Poll.
