= Marquase Lovings =

American football coach (c. 1984)

Current position
- Title: Running Backs coach
- Team: Louisiana
- Conference: Sun Belt

Biographical details
- Born: c. 1984 (age 41–42); Gainesville, Florida, U.S.
- Education: Howard University (2006); Mississippi State University (2008)

Playing career
- 2002–2003: Howard
- Position: Tight end

Coaching career (HC unless noted)
- 2004–?: Dunbar HS (DC) (assistant)
- ?–2006: P. K. Yonge HS (FL) (assistant)
- 2007–2008: Mississippi State (DQC)
- 2009–2010: Mississippi State (GA)
- 2011–2016: Louisiana–Lafayette (RB)
- 2017: Louisiana (DE)
- 2018: Nicholls State (DL)
- 2019: Austin Peay (DL)
- 2020: Austin Peay (interim HC)
- 2021: Nicholls State (DL)
- 2022–2025: Arkansas State (AHC/RB)
- 2026–present: Louisiana (RB)

Head coaching record
- Overall: 0–3 (college)

Shaun Marquase Lovings (born c. 1984) is an American college football coach. He is the running backs coach for the University of Louisiana at Lafayette. He previously coached for Dunbar High School, P. K. Yonge Developmental Research School, Mississippi State, Louisiana–Lafayette / Louisiana, Nicholls State, Austin Peay and Arkansas State University. He played college football as a walk-on tight end for Howard.

In 2020, following the resignation of Mark Hudspeth, Lovings was named interim head coach for the 2020 season. Due to COVID-19 the season was postponed after three games into the spring of 2021. He was replaced by Scotty Walden prior to the start of the spring season.

== Head coaching record ==
=== College ===
Year	Team	Overall	Conference	Standing	Bowl/playoffs
Austin Peay Governors (Ohio Valley Conference) (2020)
2020–21	Austin Peay	0–3 (Note: Lovings was named interim head coach for the fall season following the resignation of Mark Hudspeth. He was replaced by Scotty Walden for the spring season.)	0–0		
Austin Peay:		0–3	0–0		
Total:		0–3			
