= Christian Ringo =

American football player (born 1992)

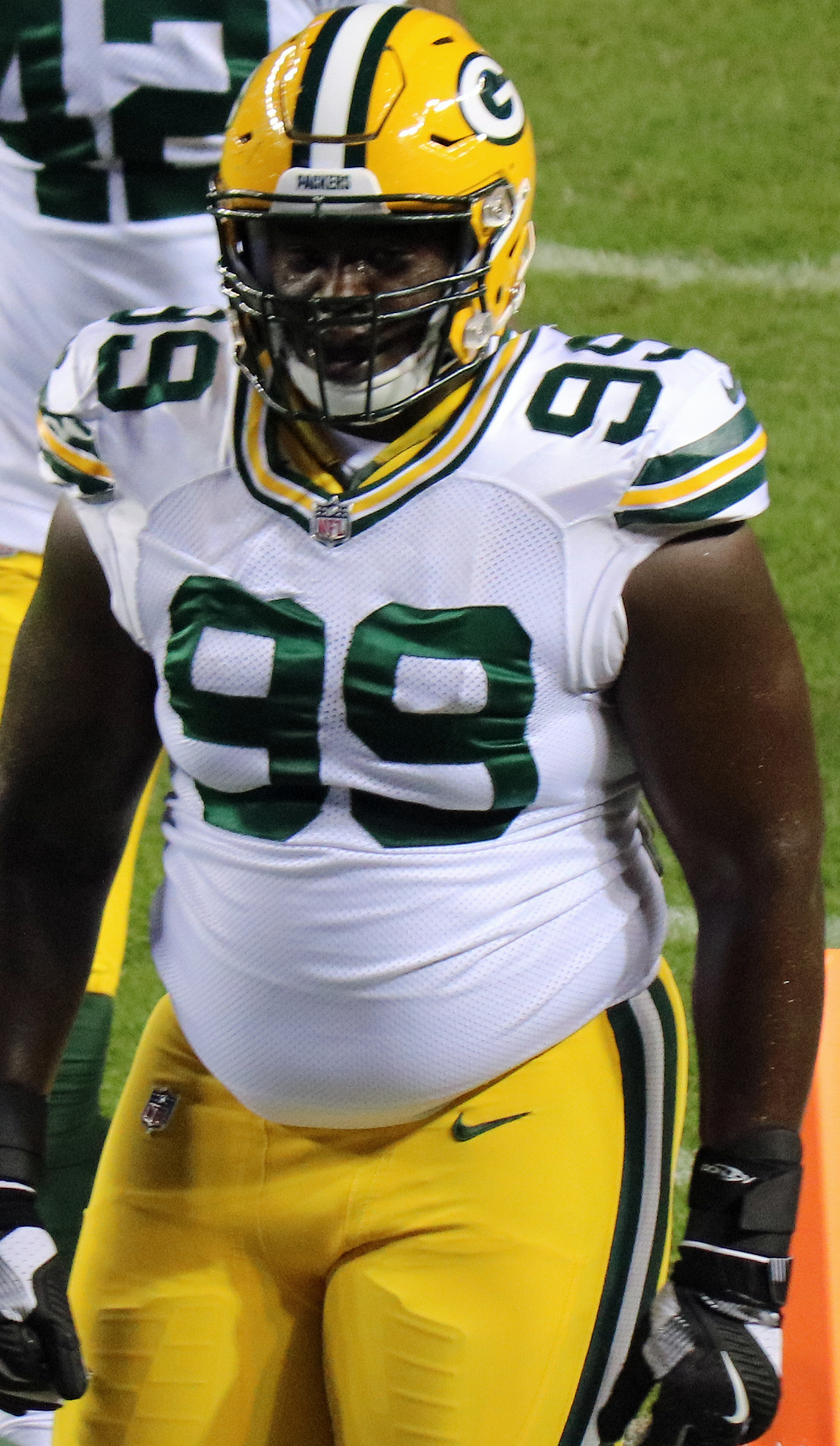
- Ringo with the Green Bay Packers in 2017

No. 99, 55, 68, 79, 70, 57
- Position: Nose tackle

Personal information
- Born: March 10, 1992 (age 34); Jackson, Mississippi, U.S.
- Listed height: 6 ft 1 in (1.85 m)
- Listed weight: 300 lb (136 kg)

Career information
- High school: Forest Hill (Jackson)
- College: Louisiana
- NFL draft: 2015: 6th round, 210th overall pick

Career history
- Green Bay Packers (2015–2016); Cincinnati Bengals (2017); Detroit Lions (2017); Dallas Cowboys (2018); Cincinnati Bengals (2018); Winnipeg Blue Bombers (2020)*; New Orleans Saints (2020–2021); Arizona Cardinals (2022)*; New Orleans Saints (2022); Baltimore Ravens (2022)*
- * Offseason or practice squad member only

Awards and highlights
- First-team All-Sun Belt (2014)

Career NFL statistics
- Total tackles: 42
- Sacks: 1.5
- Forced fumbles: 2
- Fumble recoveries: 1
- Stats at Pro Football Reference

Christian Jacques Rashad Ringo (born March 10, 1992) is an American former professional football player who was a nose tackle in the National Football League (NFL). He played college football for the Louisiana Ragin' Cajuns and was selected by the Green Bay Packers in the sixth round of the 2015 NFL draft.

== Professional career ==
External videos
- Ringo gets drafted by Green Bay

Pre-draft measurables
Height	Weight	Arm length	Hand span	40-yard dash	10-yard split	20-yard split	Vertical jump	Broad jump	Bench press	Wonderlic
6 ft 0 3/4 in (1.85 m)	293 lb (133 kg)	33 in (0.84 m)	9 1/8 in (0.23 m)	4.97 s	1.75 s	2.88 s	29 in (0.74 m)	9 ft 5 in (2.87 m)	28 reps	19
All values are from Pro Day

=== Green Bay Packers ===
Ringo was selected in the sixth round (210th overall) by the Green Bay Packers in the 2015 NFL draft. On May 8, 2015, he signed a contract with the Packers. Ringo was released by the Packers during final team cuts on September 5, 2015. On September 7, 2015, he was signed to the Packers' practice squad. Packers' linebacker Jayrone Elliott commented on Ringo in mid-November, saying he had become "the captain of the scout team". Halfway through the season, Ringo had at least one team wanting to sign him to their active roster. However, he decided to accept an offer with the Packers to increase his salary while continuing to play on the practice squad. Ringo was re-signed by the Packers after the season ended on January 18, 2016.

Ringo recorded four tackles and two sacks in the 2016 preseason, earning him a spot on the Packers' 53-man roster. He made his NFL debut against the Jacksonville Jaguars in the season opener, finishing the game with one tackle.

On April 13, 2017, Ringo signed his exclusive rights tender to remain with the Packers. He was waived by the Packers on September 5, 2017.

=== Cincinnati Bengals (first stint) ===
On September 6, 2017, Ringo was claimed off waivers by the Cincinnati Bengals. He was waived by the team on September 12, 2017.

=== Detroit Lions ===
On September 14, 2017, Ringo was signed to the Detroit Lions' practice squad. He was promoted to the active roster on November 22, 2017.

On August 31, 2018, Ringo was waived by the Lions.

=== Dallas Cowboys ===
On September 26, 2018, Ringo was signed to the Dallas Cowboys' practice squad. He was promoted to the active roster on November 17, 2018, but was waived two days later and re-signed to the practice squad.

=== Cincinnati Bengals (second stint) ===
On November 23, 2018, Ringo was signed by the Bengals off the Cowboys practice squad.

He was waived with an injury settlement during final roster cuts on August 30, 2019.

=== Winnipeg Blue Bombers ===
Ringo signed with the Winnipeg Blue Bombers of the Canadian Football League (CFL) on July 1, 2020. After the CFL canceled the 2020 season due to the COVID-19 pandemic, Ringo chose to opt-out of his contract with the Argonauts on August 28, 2020.

=== New Orleans Saints (first stint) ===
On November 11, 2020, Ringo was signed to the New Orleans Saints' practice squad. He was released on January 11, 2021. On January 18, 2021, Ringo signed a reserve/futures contract with the Saints.

=== Arizona Cardinals ===
On July 29, 2022, Ringo signed with the Arizona Cardinals. He was released on August 30, 2022.

=== New Orleans Saints (second stint) ===
On August 31, 2022, Ringo was signed to the Saints practice squad. He was released on October 20.

=== Baltimore Ravens ===
On December 28, 2022, Ringo was signed to the Baltimore Ravens practice squad. He was released on January 10, 2023.

== NFL career statistics ==
Regular season statistics
Year	Team	G	GS	Tackles					Interceptions						Fumbles	
Year	Team	G	GS	Total	Solo	Ast	Sck	SFTY	PDef	Int	Yds	Avg	Lng	TDs	FF	FR
2016	GB	8	0	2	2	0	0.0	0	0	0	0	0.0	0	0	1	0
2017	DET	6	0	3	2	1	0.0	0	0	0	0	0.0	0	0	0	0
2018	CIN	6	0	10	6	4	1.5	0	0	0	0	0.0	0	0	0	0
Total		20	0	15	10	5	1.5	0	0	0	0	0.0	0	0	1	0
Source: NFL.com
