= Mark Hudspeth =

American football player and coach (born 1968)

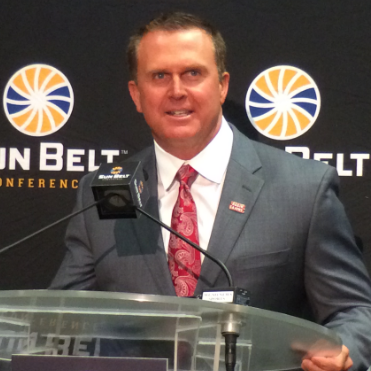
- Hudspeth at 2016 Sun Belt Media Day

Current position
- Title: Head coach
- Team: Gulf Shores HS (AL)
- Record: 17–6

Biographical details
- Born: November 10, 1968 (age 57); Louisville, Mississippi, U.S.

Playing career
- 1987–1991: Delta State
- Positions: Safety, quarterback

Coaching career (HC unless noted)
- 1992–1993: Central Arkansas (GA)
- 1994: Nicholls State (WR/TE)
- 1995: Nicholls State (RB)
- 1996–1997: Winston Academy (MS)
- 1998: Central Arkansas (DB)
- 1999–2000: Delta State (OC)
- 2001: Navy (OC)
- 2002–2008: North Alabama
- 2009–2010: Mississippi State (WR/PGC)
- 2011–2017: Louisiana–Lafayette
- 2018: Mississippi State (AHC/TE)
- 2019: Austin Peay
- 2021–present: Gulf Shores HS (AL)

Head coaching record
- Overall: 106–63 (college); 42–7 (high school)
- Bowls: 2–1 (plus 2 vacated wins)
- Tournaments: 8–4 (NCAA D-II playoffs); 2–1 (NCAA D-I playoffs)

Accomplishments and honors

Championships
- 2 GSC (2003, 2006); 1 OVC (2019)

Awards
- 2× GSC Coach of The Year (2003, 2006); OVC Coach of The Year (2019)

Mark Douglas Hudspeth (born November 10, 1968) is an American football coach and former player. He is the head football coach at Gulf Shores High School in Gulf Shores, Alabama, a position he has held since 2021. Hudspeth served as the head football coach at the University of North Alabama from 2002 to 2008, the University of Louisiana at Lafayette from 2011 to 2017, and Austin Peay State University in 2019.

== Early life and playing career ==
Hudspeth grew up in Louisville, Mississippi. Hudspeth was a schoolmate at Winston Academy in Louisville, Mississippi of Andy Kennedy, former head coach of the Ole Miss Rebels men's basketball team and Matthew Mitchell of the Kentucky Wildcats women's basketball team. He played college football at Delta State University in Cleveland, Mississippi, where he was a four-year letterman.

== Coaching career ==
=== High school career ===
Hudspeth was head coach at his alma mater, Winston Academy, from 1996 to 1997. He took Winston Academy from a program that had four wins in the previous two seasons to a 25–1 record in his two seasons and lead the team to the 1997 Mississippi Private School Association Class A state title.

=== College career ===
==== Early college career ====
Hudspeth began his coaching career at the University of Central Arkansas as a graduate assistant from 1992 to 1993. In 1994, Hudspeth moved to Nicholls State University as wide receivers/tight ends coach and he became running backs coach at Nicholls State in 1995. In 1998, he returned to the University of Central Arkansas as defensive backs coach. From 1999 to 2000, Hudspeth was offensive coordinator at his alma mater, Delta State University. In the 2000 Division II championship game, his offense set title-game records in rushing yards (524), total yards (649) and first downs (36) en route to a 63–34 win. In 2001, Hudspeth moved to the United States Naval Academy as offensive coordinator.

==== North Alabama ====
In 2002, Hudspeth was hired for his first head coaching position at the University of North Alabama. He was head coach through the 2008 season and compiled a record of 66 wins and 21 losses.

==== Mississippi State (1st tenure) ====
From 2009 to 2010, he was wide receivers coach/passing game coordinator at Mississippi State University.

==== University of Louisiana at Lafayette ====
On December 13, 2010, Hudspeth was named the 26th head football coach at Louisiana–Lafayette. In his first season in 2011, he led a team that finished 3–9 the year before to a 9–4 record and an appearance in the New Orleans Bowl – their first bowl berth since 1970.

He added three more 9–4 seasons under his belt, playing in the R+L Carriers New Orleans Bowl defeating East Carolina in 2012, Tulane in 2013 and Nevada in 2014. However, the NCAA forced Hudspeth to vacate 22 wins from 2011 to 2014, including the 2011 and 2013 New Orleans Bowls and 2013 Sun Belt Conference co-championship, due to NCAA violations involving academic fraud and payments to players by an assistant coach. The university relieved Hudspeth of his head coaching duties after the conclusion of the 2017 season.

==== Mississippi State (2nd tenure) ====
In 2018, Hudspeth returned to Mississippi State as assistant head coach/tight ends coach.

==== Austin Peay ====
In 2019, Hudspeth was hired by Austin Peay State University after Will Healy left to take the head coaching job at the University of North Carolina at Charlotte. In his first season as head coach, Hudspeth led Austin Peay to its first 11-win season in program history, its first Ohio Valley Conference (OVC) title in 42 years, and first appearance in the NCAA Division I Football Championship playoffs, where the Governors defeated Furman and Sacramento State before falling in the Quarterfinals to Montana State.

On July 3, 2020, Hudspeth resigned, initially saying he was doing so to spend more time with his family. A public records request, however, found that Hudspeth had been suspended by Austin Peay at the time of his resignation for his "recent unacceptable conduct" and for violating terms of his contract involving "egregious personal conduct" and "conduct that is clearly contrary to the character and responsibilities" of the position.

=== Return to high school coaching ===
On January 8, 2021, Hudspeth was hired as the head football coach at Gulf Shores High School in Gulf Shores, Alabama. In 2023, Hudspeth led Gulf Shores to their first-ever football state championship, defeating Ramsay High School 21-14.

== Personal life ==
Hudspeth is married to Tyla McConnell and has four sons and one daughter.

== Head coaching record ==
=== College ===
Year	Team	Overall	Conference	Standing	Bowl/playoffs	STATS^{#}	Coaches^{°}
North Alabama Lions (Gulf South Conference) (2002–2008)
2002	North Alabama	4–7	3–6	T–8th			
2003	North Alabama	13–1	9–0	1st	L NCAA Division II Semifinal		
2004	North Alabama	5–5	4–5	T–6th			
2005	North Alabama	11–3	7–2	T–2nd	L NCAA Division II Semifinal		
2006	North Alabama	11–1	8–0	1st	L NCAA Division II Quarterfinal		
2007	North Alabama	10–2	7–1	T–2nd	L NCAA Division II Quarterfinal		
2008	North Alabama	12–2	7–1	2nd	L NCAA Division II Semifinal		
North Alabama:		66–21	45–15				
Louisiana–Lafayette/Louisiana Ragin' Cajuns (Sun Belt Conference) (2011–2017)
2011	Louisiana–Lafayette	1–4*	1–2*	3rd* (vacated)	V New Orleans* (vacated)		
2012	Louisiana–Lafayette	5–4*	4–2*	T–2nd* (vacated)	W New Orleans		
2013	Louisiana–Lafayette	1–4*	0–2*	T–1st* (vacated)	V New Orleans* (vacated)		
2014	Louisiana–Lafayette	7–4*	5–1*	2nd* (vacated)	W New Orleans		
2015	Louisiana–Lafayette	4–8	3–5	T–5th			
2016	Louisiana–Lafayette	6–7	5–3	5th	L New Orleans		
2017	Louisiana	5–7	4–4	T–5th			
Louisiana–Lafayette/Louisiana:		29–38*	22–19*				
Austin Peay Governors (Ohio Valley Conference) (2019)
2019	Austin Peay	11–4	7–1	T–1st	L NCAA Division I Quarterfinal	8	10
Austin Peay:		11–4	7–1				
Total:		106–63*					
National championship Conference title Conference division title or championship game berth

* Louisiana–Lafayette vacated 22 wins from 2011 to 2014, including the 2011 and 2013 New Orleans Bowls and 2013 Sun Belt Conference co-championship, due to NCAA violations involving a former assistant. Without the vacated wins, Louisiana went 9–4 in each season between 2011 and 2014.
