= Terrance Broadway =

American football player (born 1992)

No. 8
- Position: Quarterback

Personal information
- Born: April 16, 1992 (age 34); Baton Rouge, Louisiana, U.S.
- Listed height: 6 ft 2 in (1.88 m)
- Listed weight: 211 lb (96 kg)

Career information
- High school: Capitol (Baton Rouge)
- College: Houston (2010); Louisiana-Lafayette (2011–2014)

Awards and highlights
- Davy O'Brien Award Watchlist 2014; 2014 All-Sun Belt Honorable Mention; MVP 2014 New Orleans Bowl; Davy O'Brien Award Watchlist 2013; MVP 2012 New Orleans Bowl; 2012 LSWA Newcomer of the Year; 2012 All-Sun Belt Honorable Mention
- Stats at ESPN

Terrance Joseph Broadway (born April 16, 1992) is an American college football quarterback. He was the Louisiana-Lafayette Ragin' Cajuns starting quarterback from 2012 to 2014. During his tenure, Broadway led the Cajuns to 3 bowl victories while collecting two bowl MVP's.

== Early life ==
Broadway attended Capitol High School in Baton Rouge, Louisiana. He was ranked the fifth best dual threat quarterback by Rivals.com for the Class of 2010.

== College career ==
Broadway played the 2010 NCAA Division I FBS football season as a freshman with the Houston Cougars football team, where he substituted for starting quarterback, Case Keenum, in four regular season games. His first career game was played on September 18, 2010, where he recorded 84 yards and one touchdown. He finished the season with 424 yards and three touchdowns.

In the spring semester of 2011, he transferred from the University of Houston to the University of Louisiana at Lafayette. In 2013, Broadway became one of 34 quarterbacks on the Davey O'Brien Award watch list.

In his final collegiate game, Broadway was the MVP of the 2014 New Orleans Bowl.

== Personal life ==
Broadway is the son of Connie Richerson. He has one sister, Mariah, and has a son, Terrance Joseph Broadway II, who was born in 2012.
