= Alonzo Harris (American football) =

American football player (born 1992)

Profile
- Position: Running back

Personal information
- Born: November 9, 1992 (age 33); Birmingham, Alabama, U.S.
- Listed height: 6 ft 1 in (1.85 m)
- Listed weight: 237 lb (108 kg)

Career information
- High school: Gadsden (AL) City
- College: Louisiana–Lafayette
- NFL draft: 2015: undrafted

Career history
- Green Bay Packers (2015); Baltimore Ravens (2015)*
- * Offseason or practice squad member only

Awards and highlights
- First-team All-Sun Belt (2013)

Career NFL statistics
- Rushing attempts: 4
- Rushing yards: 19
- Rushing touchdowns: 0
- Stats at Pro Football Reference

Alonzo Harris (born November 9, 1992) is an American professional football running back who is a free agent. He played college football for the Louisiana–Lafayette Ragin' Cajuns. He was signed by the Packers as an undrafted free agent in 2015.

== Professional career ==
=== Green Bay Packers ===
In May 2015 Harris signed with the Green Bay Packers as an undrafted free agent. On December 3, 2015, Harris was waived after missing curfew the night before a game against the Detroit Lions.
