= 2014 Louisiana–Monroe Warhawks football team =

American college football season

2014 Louisiana–Monroe Warhawks football
- Conference: Sun Belt Conference
- Record: 4–8 (3–5 Sun Belt)
- Head coach: Todd Berry (5th season)
- Offensive coordinator: Steve Farmer (7th season)
- Offensive scheme: Air raid
- Defensive coordinator: Troy Reffett (6th season)
- Base defense: 3–3–5
- Home stadium: Malone Stadium

2014 Sun Belt Conference football standings
	Conf.			Overall
Team	W		L	W		L
Georgia Southern * $	8	–	0	9	–	3
Louisiana–Lafayette ***	5	–	1	7	–	4
Appalachian State *	6	–	2	7	–	5
Texas State	5	–	3	7	–	5
Arkansas State	5	–	3	7	–	6
South Alabama	5	–	3	6	–	7
Louisiana–Monroe	3	–	5	4	–	8
Troy	3	–	5	3	–	9
New Mexico State	1	–	7	2	–	10
Idaho **	1	–	7	1	–	10
Georgia State	0	–	8	1	–	11
$ – Conference champion; * – Appalachian State and Georgia Southern ineligible for postseason play due to FCS-to-FBS transition rules ** – Idaho ineligible for postseason play due to APR penalties *** – Louisiana–Lafayette vacated 2 wins due to NCAA violations

The 2014 Louisiana–Monroe Warhawks football team represented the University of Louisiana at Monroe in the 2014 NCAA Division I FBS football season. The team was led by fifth-year head coach Todd Berry. The Warhawks played their home games at Malone Stadium and competed in the Sun Belt Conference. They finished the season 4–8, 3–5 in Sun Belt play to finish in a tie for seventh place.

== Schedule ==
Date	Time	Opponent	Site	TV	Result	Attendance
August 28	6:00 pm	Wake Forest*	Malone Stadium; Monroe, LA	ESPNU	W 17–10	21,003
September 6	6:00 pm	Idaho	Malone Stadium; Monroe, LA	ESPN3	W 38–31	16,694
September 13	6:00 pm	at No. 9 LSU*	Tiger Stadium; Baton Rouge, LA	ESPNU	L 0–31	101,194
September 27	6:00 pm	Troy^{†}	Malone Stadium; Monroe, LA	Sun Belt Network	W 22–20	18,544
October 4	6:00 pm	at Arkansas State	Centennial Bank Stadium; Jonesboro, AR	ESPN3	L 14–28	29,317
October 11	11:00 am	at Kentucky*	Commonwealth Stadium; Lexington, KY	SECN	L 14–48	56,676
October 25	6:00 pm	Texas State	Malone Stadium; Monroe, LA	ESPN3	L 18–22	14,755
November 1	11:00 am	at Texas A&M*	Kyle Field; College Station, TX	SECN	L 16–21	100,922
November 8	2:30 pm	at Appalachian State	Kidd Brewer Stadium; Boone, NC	ESPN3	L 29–31	20,497
November 15	6:00 pm	Louisiana–Lafayette	Malone Stadium; Monroe, LA (Battle on the Bayou)	ESPN3	L 27–34	19,544
November 22	3:00 pm	at New Mexico State	Aggie Memorial Stadium; Las Cruces, NM	ESPN3	W 30–17	6,011
November 29	5:00 pm	at Georgia Southern	Paulson Stadium; Statesboro, GA	ESPN3	L 16–22	16,283
*Non-conference game; ^{†}Homecoming; Rankings from Coaches' Poll released prior to the game; All times are in Central time

- Source: Schedule

== Roster ==
2014 Louisiana–Monroe Warhawks football team roster
Players
Coaches
Offense

Pos.	#	Name	Class
WR	2	Rashon Ceaser	Jr
RB	3	Tyler Cain	Jr
RB	5	Centarius Donald	Sr
WR	6	Brian Williams	Fr
QB	9	Earnest Carrington	Jr
QB	12	Brayle Brown	Jr
QB	14	Pete Thomas	Sr

Defense

Pos.	#	Name	Class
DE	96	Ben Banogu	Fr

Special teams

Pos.	#	Name	Class
K, P	17	Justin Manton	Sr
DS	44	Todd Phillips	Jr
K	60	Craig Ford	Fr

Head coach

- Todd Berry (5th season)

Coordinators/assistant coaches

- Steve Farmer – Assistant Head Coach/Offensive Coordinator/Offensive Line
- Troy Reffett – Defensive Coordinator/Cornerbacks
- Mario Price – Running Backs/Recruiting Coordinator
- Cody Wells – Tight Ends
- Jason Nichols – Outside Wide Receivers/Passing Game Coordinator
- Travis Niekamp – Linebackers/Special Teams
- John Mumford – Defensive Line
- Adam Waugh – Safeties
- Josh Boulware – Graduate Assistant Coach
- Michael Cross – Graduate Assistant Coach
- Daniel Lopez – Graduate Assistant Coach
- Joe Girardi – Strength and Conditioning Coordinator

Legend

- (C) Team captain
- (S) Suspended
- (I) Ineligible
- Injured
- Redshirt

Roster

== Game summaries ==
=== Wake Forest ===
Wake Forest @ Louisiana–Monroe

Team	1	2	3	4	Total
Demon Deacons	7	3	0	0	10
• Warhawks	0	0	10	7	17

- Date: August 28
- Location: Malone Stadium
  Monroe, LA
- Game start: 6:00 p.m. CDT
- Elapsed time: 3:16
- Game attendance: 21,003
- Game weather: Partly cloudy • Temperature: 87 °F (31 °C) • Wind: SE 6 MPH
- Referee: Pat Garvey
- TV announcers (ESPNU): Dave LaMont, David Diaz-Infante

Statistics	WF	ULM
First downs	5	21
Total yards	94	352
Rushing yards	−3	163
Passing yards	97	189
Turnovers	1	1
Time of possession	24:37	35:23

Team	Category	Player	Statistics
Wake Forest	Passing	John Wolford	12/22, 97 yards, INT
Wake Forest	Rushing	Orville Reynolds	16 rushes, 37 yards
Wake Forest	Receiving	Matt James	3 receptions, 40 yards
Louisiana–Monroe	Passing	Pete Thomas	23/41, 189 yards
Louisiana–Monroe	Rushing	Centarius Donald	26 rushes, 117 yards
Louisiana–Monroe	Receiving	Kenzee Jackson	6 receptions, 83 yards

In their first game of the season, the Warhawks won, 17–10 over the Wake Forest Demon Deacons.

Scoring summary

Quarter	Time	Drive			Team	Scoring information	Score	
Quarter	Time	Plays	Yards	TOP	Team	Scoring information	Wake Forest	Louisiana–Monroe
1	12:10	1	25		Wake Forest	Kevin Johnson 25-yard blocked punt return, Mike Weaver kick good	7	0
2	0:43	9	45	3:24	Wake Forest	38-yard field goal by Mike Weaver	10	0
3	4:50	16	83	7:01	Louisiana–Monroe	30-yard field goal by Justin Manton	10	3
3	4:02				Louisiana–Monroe	Interception returned 31 yards for touchdown by Mitch Lane, Justin Manton kick good	10	10
4	3:37	12	66	5:47	Louisiana–Monroe	Pete Thomas 9-yard touchdown run, Justin Manton kick good	10	17
"TOP" = time of possession. For other American football terms, see Glossary of American football.							10	17

=== Idaho ===
Idaho @ Louisiana–Monroe

Team	1	2	3	4	Total
Vandals	7	14	0	10	31
• Warhawks	21	3	7	7	38

- Date: September 6
- Location: Malone Stadium
  Monroe, LA
- Game start: 6:00 p.m. CDT
- Elapsed time: 5:34
- Game attendance: 16,694
- Game weather: Partly cloudy • Temperature: 90 °F (32 °C) • Wind: NE 6 MPH
- Referee: Charles Lewis
- TV announcers (ESPN3): Brock Bowling, Curtis Braham

Statistics	IDHO	ULM
First downs	25	29
Total yards	442	534
Rushing yards	118	150
Passing yards	324	384
Turnovers	3	1
Time of possession	32:09	27:51

Team	Category	Player	Statistics
Idaho	Passing	Matt Linehan	26/47, 324 yards, 3 TD, 2 INT
Idaho	Rushing	Jerrel Brown	22 rushes, 117 yards
Idaho	Receiving	Deon Watson	7 receptions, 98 yards, TD
Louisiana–Monroe	Passing	Pete Thomas	24/44, 384 yards, 2 TD, INT
Louisiana–Monroe	Rushing	Centarius Donald	20 rushes, 111 yards, 3 TD
Louisiana–Monroe	Receiving	Ajalen Holley	6 receptions, 175 yards, TD

In their second game of the season, the Warhawks won, 38–31 over the Idaho Vandals.

Scoring summary

Quarter	Time	Drive			Team	Scoring information	Score	
Quarter	Time	Plays	Yards	TOP	Team	Scoring information	Idaho	Louisiana–Monroe
1	11:42	6	75	3:18	Idaho	Joshua McCain 9-yard touchdown reception from Matt Linehan, Austin Rehkow kick good	7	0
1	6:03	5	81	2:03	Louisiana–Monroe	Alec Osborne 2-yard touchdown reception from Pete Thomas, Justin Manton kick good	7	7
1	3:32	2	77	0:40	Louisiana–Monroe	Ajalen Holley 58-yard touchdown reception from Pete Thomas, Justin Manton kick good	7	14
1	0:20	3	83	1:05	Louisiana–Monroe	Centarius Donald 34-yard touchdown run, Justin Manton kick good	7	21
2	7:50	10	57	3:44	Idaho	Elijhaa Penny 3-yard touchdown run, Austin Rehkow kick good	14	21
2	6:52	3	15	0:45	Idaho	Joshua McCain 10-yard touchdown reception from Matt Linehan, Austin Rehkow kick good	21	21
2	0:13	13	61	1:32	Louisiana–Monroe	27-yard field goal by Justin Manton	21	24
3	8:36	2	21	0:38	Louisiana–Monroe	Centarius Donald 21-yard touchdown run, Justin Manton kick good	21	31
4	13:59	12	86	3:51	Idaho	28-yard field goal by Austin Rehkow	24	31
4	4:22	11	64	3:27	Idaho	Deon Watson 32-yard touchdown reception from Matt Linehan, Austin Rehkow kick good	31	31
4	0:09	6	73	1:02	Louisiana–Monroe	Centarius Donald 1-yard touchdown run, Justin Manton kick good	31	38
"TOP" = time of possession. For other American football terms, see Glossary of American football.							31	38

=== At No. 9 LSU ===
Louisiana–Monroe @ LSU

Team	1	2	3	4	Total
Warhawks	0	0	0	0	0
• No. 9 Tigers	3	7	14	7	31

- Date: September 13
- Location: Tiger Stadium
  Baton Rouge, LA
- Game start: 6:00 p.m. CDT
- Elapsed time: 3:01
- Game attendance: 101,194
- Game weather: Overcast • Temperature: 80 °F (27 °C) • Wind: NNE 5–7 MPH
- Referee: David Smith
- TV announcers (ESPNU): Clay Matvick, Anthony Becht, Dawn Davenport

Statistics	ULM	LSU
First downs	6	22
Total yards	93	372
Rushing yards	16	219
Passing yards	77	153
Turnovers	1	1
Time of possession	25:02	34:58

Team	Category	Player	Statistics
Louisiana–Monroe	Passing	Pete Thomas	16/30, 77 yards
Louisiana–Monroe	Rushing	Centarius Donald	10 rushes, 24 yards
Louisiana–Monroe	Receiving	Rashon Ceaser	6 receptions, 35 yards
LSU	Passing	Anthony Jennings	11/18, 139 yards, INT
LSU	Rushing	Leonard Fournette	10 rushes, 52 yards, TD
LSU	Receiving	Travin Dural	6 receptions, 79 yards

In their third game of the season, the Warhawks lost, 31–0 to the LSU Tigers.

Scoring summary

Quarter	Time	Drive			Team	Scoring information	Score	
Quarter	Time	Plays	Yards	TOP	Team	Scoring information	Louisiana–Monroe	LSU
1	3:20	12	45	5:41	LSU	21-yard field goal by Colby Delahoussaye	0	3
2	13:11	10	85	3:38	LSU	Darrel Williams 22-yard touchdown run, Colby Delahoussaye kick good	0	10
3	7:22	8	54	2:49	LSU	Darrel Williams 1-yard touchdown run, Colby Delahoussaye kick good	0	17
3	3:26	5	34	2:32	LSU	Leonard Fournette 24-yard touchdown run, Colby Delahoussaye kick good	0	24
4	12:19	10	58	4:57	LSU	Kenny Hilliard 4-yard touchdown run, Colby Delahoussaye kick good	0	31
"TOP" = time of possession. For other American football terms, see Glossary of American football.							0	31

=== Troy ===
Troy @ Louisiana–Monroe

Team	1	2	3	4	Total
Trojans	0	14	0	6	20
• Warhawks	10	3	6	3	22

- Date: September 27
- Location: Malone Stadium
  Monroe, LA
- Game start: 6:00 p.m. CDT
- Elapsed time: 3:06
- Game attendance: 18,544
- Game weather: Partly cloudy • Temperature: 84 °F (29 °C) • Wind: NE 11 MPH
- Referee: Jeff Hilyer
- TV announcers (Sun Belt Network): Matt Stewart, Rocky Boiman

Statistics	TROY	ULM
First downs	17	19
Total yards	351	357
Rushing yards	81	29
Passing yards	270	328
Turnovers	1	1
Time of possession	25:16	34:44

Team	Category	Player	Statistics
Troy	Passing	Brandon Silvers	23/34, 270 yards, 3 TD
Troy	Rushing	Brandon Silvers	14 rushes, 32 yards
Troy	Receiving	Bryan Holmes	7 receptions, 97 yards, TD
Louisiana–Monroe	Passing	Pete Thomas	28/43, 328 yards, 2 TD, INT
Louisiana–Monroe	Rushing	Centarius Donald	15 rushes, 42 yards
Louisiana–Monroe	Receiving	Rashon Ceaser	12 receptions, 121 yards

In their fourth game of the season, the Warhawks won, 22–20 over the Troy Trojans.

Scoring summary

Quarter	Time	Drive			Team	Scoring information	Score	
Quarter	Time	Plays	Yards	TOP	Team	Scoring information	Troy	Louisiana–Monroe
1	8:19	11	62	5:15	Louisiana–Monroe	37-yard field goal by Justin Manton	0	3
1	5:54	3	72	1:10	Louisiana–Monroe	Ajalen Holley 64-yard touchdown reception from Pete Thomas, Justin Manton kick good	0	10
2	13:39	14	80	5:10	Louisiana–Monroe	34-yard field goal by Justin Manton	0	13
2	5:51	10	98	3:39	Troy	Bryan Holmes 19-yard touchdown reception from Brandon Silvers, Jed Solomon kick good	7	13
2	0:41	5	37	0:44	Troy	Chandler Worthy 4-yard touchdown reception from Brandon Silvers, Jed Solomon kick good	14	13
3	3:05	7	48	3:03	Louisiana–Monroe	Ajalen Holley 15-yard touchdown reception from Pete Thomas, 2-point pass failed	14	19
4	7:36	7	80	2:26	Troy	Chandler Worthy 6-yard touchdown reception from Brandon Silvers, 2-point run failed	20	19
4	2:08	13	57	5:28	Louisiana–Monroe	29-yard field goal by Justin Manton	20	22
"TOP" = time of possession. For other American football terms, see Glossary of American football.							20	22

=== At Arkansas State ===
Louisiana–Monroe @ Arkansas State

Team	1	2	3	4	Total
Warhawks	0	0	0	14	14
• Red Wolves	0	0	14	14	28

- Date: October 4
- Location: Centennial Bank Stadium
  Jonesboro, AR
- Game start: 6:00 p.m. CDT
- Elapsed time: 3:32
- Game attendance: 29,317
- Game weather: Temperature: 61.7 • Wind: 11 MPH W • Weather: Mostly Clear
- Referee: Tony Backert
- TV announcers (ESPN3): Brock Bowling, Wayne Gandy

Statistics	ULM	ARST
First downs	16	29
Total yards	348	572
Rushing yards	72	288
Passing yards	276	284
Turnovers	2	3
Time of possession	23:18	36:42

Team	Category	Player	Statistics
Louisiana–Monroe	Passing	Pete Thomas	21/39, 181 yards, TD
Louisiana–Monroe	Rushing	Centarius Donald	11 rushes, 56 yards
Louisiana–Monroe	Receiving	Kenzee Jackson	6 receptions, 82 yards, TD
Arkansas State	Passing	Fredi Knighten	21/36, 284 yards, TD, 2 INT
Arkansas State	Rushing	Michael Gordon	15 rushes, 168 yards
Arkansas State	Receiving	J. D. McKissic	8 receptions, 120 yards

In their fifth game of the season, the Warhawks lost, 28–14 to the Arkansas State Red Wolves.

Scoring summary

Quarter	Time	Drive			Team	Scoring information	Score	
Quarter	Time	Plays	Yards	TOP	Team	Scoring information	Louisiana–Monroe	Arkansas State
3	8:51	3	71	0:33	Arkansas State	Fredi Knighten 3-yard touchdown run, Luke Ferguson kick good	0	7
3	1:38	11	80	4:30	Arkansas State	Tyler Trosin 12-yard touchdown reception from Fredi Knighten, Luke Ferguson kick good	0	14
4	12:21	1	59	0:10	Louisiana–Monroe	Ajalen Holley 59-yard touchdown reception from Pete Thomas, Justin Manton kick good	7	14
4	10:08	6	75	2:13	Arkansas State	Fredi Knighten 29-yard touchdown run, Luke Ferguson kick good	7	21
4	9:13	2	22	0:25	Arkansas State	Fredi Knighten 12-yard touchdown run, Luke Ferguson kick good	7	28
4	1:30	7	97	1:11	Louisiana–Monroe	Kenzee Jackson 41-yard touchdown reception from Brayle Brown, Justin Manton kick good	14	28
"TOP" = time of possession. For other American football terms, see Glossary of American football.							14	28

=== At Kentucky ===
Louisiana–Monroe @ Kentucky

Team	1	2	3	4	Total
Warhawks	14	0	0	0	14
• Wildcats	3	21	21	3	48

- Date: October 11
- Location: Commonwealth Stadium
  Lexington, KY
- Game start: 11:00 a.m. CDT
- Elapsed time: 3:19
- Game attendance: 56,676
- Game weather: Temperature: 54 deg • Wind: 13mph NE • Weather: Hazy
- Referee: Ken Williamson
- TV announcers (SECN): Dave Neal, Andre Ware, Laura Rutledge

Statistics	ULM	UK
First downs	15	15
Total yards	264	352
Rushing yards	77	136
Passing yards	187	216
Turnovers	3	1
Time of possession	35:08	24:52

Team	Category	Player	Statistics
Louisiana–Monroe	Passing	Pete Thomas	20/31, 167 yards, 2 TD, INT
Louisiana–Monroe	Rushing	Kaylon Watson	8 rushes, 32 yards
Louisiana–Monroe	Receiving	Kenzee Jackson	8 receptions, 73 yards, TD
Kentucky	Passing	Patrick Towles	16/28, 216 yards, 3 TD
Kentucky	Rushing	Stanley Williams	7 rushes, 104 yards, TD
Kentucky	Receiving	Javess Blue	3 receptions, 109 yards, 2 TD

In their sixth game of the season, the Warhawks lost, 48–14 to the Kentucky Wildcats.

Scoring summary

Quarter	Time	Drive			Team	Scoring information	Score	
Quarter	Time	Plays	Yards	TOP	Team	Scoring information	Louisiana–Monroe	Kentucky
1	13:30	4	6	1:30	Kentucky	37-yard field goal by Austin MacGinnis	0	3
1	7:36	10	84	3:41	Louisiana–Monroe	Ajalen Holley 12-yard touchdown reception from Pete Thomas, Justin Manton kick good	7	3
1	0:00	1	9	0:02	Louisiana–Monroe	Kenzee Jackson 9-yard touchdown reception from Pete Thomas, Justin Manton kick good	14	3
2	8:52	2	88	0:51	Kentucky	Javess Blue 83-yard touchdown reception from Patrick Towles, Austin MacGinnis kick good	14	10
2	7:47				Kentucky	Interception returned 29 yards for touchdown by Josh Forrest, Austin MacGinnis kick good	14	17
2	4:08	6	44	2:14	Kentucky	Blake Bone 4-yard touchdown reception from Patrick Towles, Austin MacGinnis kick good	14	24
3	7:17	4	30	1:00	Kentucky	Javess Blue 21-yard touchdown reception from Patrick Towles, Austin MacGinnis kick good	14	31
3	5:49				Kentucky	Interception returned 36 yards for touchdown by Marcus McWilson, Austin MacGinnis kick good	14	38
3	4:07	2	64	0:34	Kentucky	Stanley Williams 58-yard touchdown run, Austin MacGinnis kick good	14	45
4	14:10	7	52	2:30	Kentucky	30-yard field goal by Austin MacGinnis	14	48
"TOP" = time of possession. For other American football terms, see Glossary of American football.							14	48

=== Texas State ===
Texas State @ Louisiana–Monroe

Team	1	2	3	4	Total
• Bobcats	0	0	7	15	22
Warhawks	3	10	5	0	18

- Date: October 25
- Location: Malone Stadium
  Monroe, LA
- Game start: 6:00 p.m. CDT
- Elapsed time: 2:59
- Game attendance: 14,755
- Game weather: Temperature: 82 • Wind: SW 8 • Weather: Clear, Humidity 58%
- Referee: Charles Lewis
- TV announcers (ESPN3): Drew Fellios, Forrest Conoly

Statistics	TXST	ULM
First downs	17	20
Total yards	370	394
Rushing yards	229	144
Passing yards	141	250
Turnovers	0	1
Time of possession	26:13	33:47

Team	Category	Player	Statistics
Texas State	Passing	Tyler Jones	14/20, 141 yards, TD
Texas State	Rushing	Robert Lowe	17 rushes, 91 yards, 2 TD
Texas State	Receiving	Terrence Franks	2 receptions, 68 yards, TD
Louisiana–Monroe	Passing	Pete Thomas	22/36, 236 yards, INT
Louisiana–Monroe	Rushing	Centarius Donald	21 rushes, 86 yards, TD
Louisiana–Monroe	Receiving	Ajalen Holley	8 receptions, 89 yards

In their seventh game of the season, the Warhawks lost, 22–18 to the Texas State Bobcats.

Scoring summary

Quarter	Time	Drive			Team	Scoring information	Score	
Quarter	Time	Plays	Yards	TOP	Team	Scoring information	Texas State	Louisiana–Monroe
1	8:37	10	46	4:25	Louisiana–Monroe	51-yard field goal by Justin Manton	0	3
2	10:47	11	35	4:35	Louisiana–Monroe	43-yard field goal by Justin Manton	0	6
2	5:00	10	76	3:33	Louisiana–Monroe	Centarius Donald 6-yard touchdown run, Justin Manton kick good	0	13
3	11:21	1			Louisiana–Monroe	Tyler Jones called for intentional grounding in the endzone for a safety	0	15
3	5:49	9	78	3:33	Texas State	Robert Lowe 15-yard touchdown run, Will Johnson kick good	7	15
3	1:06	11	64	4:43	Louisiana–Monroe	28-yard field goal by Justin Manton	7	18
4	6:50	9	76	3:08	Texas State	Terrence Franks 40-yard touchdown reception from Tyler Jones, 2-point run good	15	18
4	3:29	5	62	2:01	Texas State	Robert Lowe 21-yard touchdown run, Will Johnson kick good	22	18
"TOP" = time of possession. For other American football terms, see Glossary of American football.							22	18

=== At Texas A&M ===
Louisiana–Monroe @ Texas A&M

Team	1	2	3	4	Total
Warhawks	0	10	0	6	16
• Aggies	7	14	0	0	21

- Date: November 1
- Location: Kyle Field
  College Station, TX
- Game start: 11:00 a.m. CDT
- Elapsed time: 3:18
- Game attendance: 100,922
- Game weather: Sunny and cool • Temperature: 52 °F (11 °C) • Wind: E at 15 MPH
- Referee: Jeff Hilyer
- TV announcers (SECN): Dave Neal, Andre Ware, Laura Rutledge

Statistics	ULM	TAMU
First downs	19	16
Total yards	347	243
Rushing yards	78	137
Passing yards	269	106
Turnovers	1	2
Time of possession	33:47	26:13

Team	Category	Player	Statistics
Louisiana–Monroe	Passing	Pete Thomas	26/47, 246 yards, INT
Louisiana–Monroe	Rushing	Pete Thomas	19 rushes, 44 yards
Louisiana–Monroe	Receiving	Rashon Ceaser	5 receptions, 99 yards
Texas A&M	Passing	Kyle Allen	13/28, 106 yards, TD, INT
Texas A&M	Rushing	Brandon Williams	19 rushes, 71 yards, TD
Texas A&M	Receiving	Speedy Noil	5 receptions, 69 yards, TD

In their eighth game of the season, the Warhawks lost, 21–16 to the Texas A&M Aggies.

Scoring summary

Quarter	Time	Drive			Team	Scoring information	Score	
Quarter	Time	Plays	Yards	TOP	Team	Scoring information	Louisiana–Monroe	Texas A&M
1	10:44	13	75	4:16	Texas A&M	Brandon Williams 1-yard touchdown run, Josh Lambo kick good	0	7
2	13:56	8	90	3:35	Louisiana–Monroe	Centarius Donald 1-yard touchdown run, Justin Manton kick good	7	7
2	5:05	3	12	0:51	Texas A&M	Tra Carson 5-yard touchdown run, Josh Lambo kick good	7	14
2	1:05	8	58	2:33	Texas A&M	Speedy Noil 39-yard touchdown reception from Kyle Allen, Josh Lambo kick good	7	21
2	0:01	6	29	1:04	Louisiana–Monroe	51-yard field goal by Justin Manton	10	21
4	14:58	17	76	6:23	Louisiana–Monroe	23-yard field goal by Justin Manton	13	21
4	10:26	11	33	4:17	Louisiana–Monroe	22-yard field goal by Justin Manton	16	21
"TOP" = time of possession. For other American football terms, see Glossary of American football.							16	21

=== At Appalachian State ===
Louisiana–Monroe @ Appalachian State

Team	1	2	3	4	Total
Warhawks	6	14	3	6	29
• Mountaineers	7	14	0	10	31

- Date: November 8
- Location: Kidd Brewer Stadium
  Boone, NC
- Game start: 2:30 p.m. CST
- Elapsed time: 3:24
- Game attendance: 20,497
- Game weather: Sunny • Temperature: 52 °F (11 °C) • Wind: S 6 MPH
- Referee: Tony Backert
- TV announcers (ESPN3): Roy Philpott, Al Groh

Statistics	ULM	APP
First downs	20	23
Total yards	299	380
Rushing yards	55	104
Passing yards	244	276
Turnovers	0	1
Time of possession	27:46	32:14

Team	Category	Player	Statistics
Louisiana–Monroe	Passing	Pete Thomas	20/41, 244 yards, 2 TD
Louisiana–Monroe	Rushing	Centarius Donald	16 rushes, 71 yards
Louisiana–Monroe	Receiving	Rashon Ceaser	6 receptions, 87 yards
Appalachian State	Passing	Taylor Lamb	25/35, 276 yards, 2 TD, INT
Appalachian State	Rushing	Marcus Cox	21 rushes, 94 yards, TD
Appalachian State	Receiving	Malachi Jones	7 receptions, 82 yards

In their ninth game of the season, the Warhawks lost, 31–29 to the Appalachian State Mountaineers.

Scoring summary

Quarter	Time	Drive			Team	Scoring information	Score	
Quarter	Time	Plays	Yards	TOP	Team	Scoring information	Louisiana–Monroe	Appalachian State
1	9:58	12	63	4:57	Louisiana–Monroe	31-yard field goal by Justin Manton	3	0
1	4:21	12	80	5:29	Appalachian State	Simms McElfresh 4-yard touchdown run, Bentlee Critcher kick good	3	7
1	0:43	11	54	3:38	Louisiana–Monroe	38-yard field goal by Justin Manton	6	7
2	11:32	1	12	0:08	Louisiana–Monroe	Kenzee Jackson 12-yard touchdown reception from Pete Thomas, Justin Manton kick good	13	7
2	8:02	4	33	1:05	Louisiana–Monroe	Pete Thomas 1-yard touchdown run, Justin Manton kick good	20	7
2	2:24	12	75	5:38	Appalachian State	Tacoi Sumler 8-yard touchdown reception from Taylor Lamb, Bentlee Critcher kick good	20	14
2	0:06	5	63	0:39	Appalachian State	Barrett Burns 1-yard touchdown reception from Taylor Lamb, Bentlee Critcher kick good	20	21
3	8:44	11	56	4:23	Louisiana–Monroe	35-yard field goal by Justin Manton	23	21
4	6:10	12	89	5:00	Appalachian State	Marcus Cox 7-yard touchdown run, Bentlee Critcher kick good	23	28
4	1:42	14	72	4:22	Louisiana–Monroe	Ajalen Holley 3-yard touchdown reception from Pete Thomas, 2-point pass failed	29	28
4	0:29	7	53	1:13	Appalachian State	39-yard field goal by Bentlee Critcher	29	31
"TOP" = time of possession. For other American football terms, see Glossary of American football.							29	31

=== Louisiana–Lafayette ===
Louisiana–Lafayette @ Louisiana–Monroe

Team	1	2	3	4	Total
• Ragin' Cajuns	17	3	0	14	34
Warhawks	7	6	0	14	27

- Date: November 15
- Location: Malone Stadium
  Monroe, LA
- Game start: 6:00 p.m. CST
- Elapsed time: 3:05
- Game attendance: 19,544
- Game weather: Temperature: 46 • Wind: SE 3 • Weather: Cloudy, Humidity 45%
- Referee: Jeff Hilyer
- TV announcers (ESPN3): Matt Stewart, Rocky Boiman, Danielle Percival

Statistics	ULL	ULM
First downs	20	21
Total yards	456	444
Rushing yards	282	-39
Passing yards	174	483
Turnovers	1	3
Time of possession	30:38	29:22

Team	Category	Player	Statistics
Louisiana–Lafayette	Passing	Terrance Broadway	10/13, 173 yards, 2 TD, INT
Louisiana–Lafayette	Rushing	Alonzo Harris	13 rushes, 133 yards
Louisiana–Lafayette	Receiving	James Butler	4 receptions, 61 yards
Louisiana–Monroe	Passing	Pete Thomas	38/54, 472 yards, 2 TD
Louisiana–Monroe	Rushing	Centarius Donald	7 rushes, 1 yard
Louisiana–Monroe	Receiving	Rashon Ceaser	11 receptions, 120 yards, TD

In their tenth game of the season, the Warhawks lost, 34–27 to the Louisiana–Lafayette Ragin' Cajuns.

Scoring summary

Quarter	Time	Drive			Team	Scoring information	Score	
Quarter	Time	Plays	Yards	TOP	Team	Scoring information	Louisiana–Lafayette	Louisiana–Monroe
1	10:59	7	70	4:01	Louisiana–Lafayette	22-yard field goal by Hunter Stover	3	0
1	7:03	5	61	2:01	Louisiana–Lafayette	Elijah McGuire 1-yard touchdown run, Hunter Stover kick good	10	0
1	2:24	10	85	4:39	Louisiana–Monroe	Kenzee Jackson 5-yard touchdown reception from Pete Thomas, Justin Manton kick good	10	7
1	0:42	4	65	1:42	Louisiana–Lafayette	Al Riles 16-yard touchdown reception from Terrance Broadway, Hunter Stover kick good	17	7
2	12:38	11	66	3:04	Louisiana–Monroe	34-yard field goal by Justin Manton	17	10
2	6:51	12	53	5:47	Louisiana–Lafayette	38-yard field goal by Hunter Stover	20	10
2	0:00	6	41	0:51	Louisiana–Monroe	47-yard field goal by Justin Manton	20	13
4	11:00	3	16	1:32	Louisiana–Lafayette	Terrance Broadway 12-yard touchdown run, Hunter Stover kick good	27	13
4	6:46	11	65	4:14	Louisiana–Monroe	Pete Thomas 2-yard touchdown run, Justin Manton kick good	27	20
4	2:53	7	75	3:53	Louisiana–Lafayette	Gabe Fuselier 36-yard touchdown reception from Terrance Broadway, Hunter Stover kick good	34	20
4	1:47	4	84	1:06	Louisiana–Monroe	Rashon Ceaser 45-yard touchdown reception from Pete Thomas, Justin Manton kick good	34	27
"TOP" = time of possession. For other American football terms, see Glossary of American football.							34	27

=== At New Mexico State ===
Louisiana–Monroe @ New Mexico State

Team	1	2	3	4	Total
• Warhawks	10	10	7	3	30
Aggies	0	17	0	0	17

- Date: November 22
- Location: Aggie Memorial Stadium
  Las Cruces, NM
- Game start: 3:00 p.m. CST
- Elapsed time: 3:10
- Game attendance: 6,011
- Referee: Kevin Stine
- TV announcers (ESPN3): Glen Cerny, Danny Knee

Statistics	ULM	NMSU
First downs	19	19
Total yards	420	378
Rushing yards	70	276
Passing yards	350	102
Turnovers	2	2
Time of possession	29:03	30:57

Team	Category	Player	Statistics
Louisiana–Monroe	Passing	Pete Thomas	35/50, 350 yards, TD, INT
Louisiana–Monroe	Rushing	Centarius Donald	13 rushes, 35 yards, TD
Louisiana–Monroe	Receiving	Kenzee Jackson	13 receptions, 108 yards
New Mexico State	Passing	Tyler Rogers	15/32, 102 yards, INT
New Mexico State	Rushing	Larry Rose III	35 rushes, 229 yards, 2 TD
New Mexico State	Receiving	Teldric Morgan	4 receptions, 41 yards

In their eleventh game of the season, the Warhawks won, 30–17 over the New Mexico State Aggies.

Scoring summary

Quarter	Time	Drive			Team	Scoring information	Score	
Quarter	Time	Plays	Yards	TOP	Team	Scoring information	Louisiana–Monroe	New Mexico State
1	6:03	8	77	3:08	Louisiana–Monroe	28-yard field goal by Justin Manton	3	0
1	3:27	2	5	0:35	Louisiana–Monroe	Centarius Donald 1-yard touchdown run, Justin Manton kick good	10	0
2	14:53	3	46	0:49	New Mexico State	Larry Rose III 37-yard touchdown run, Maxwell Johnson kick good	10	7
2	7:30	14	71	4:48	New Mexico State	32-yard field goal by Maxwell Johnson	10	10
2	4:16	9	75	3:14	Louisiana–Monroe	Rashon Ceaser 3-yard touchdown reception from Pete Thomas, Justin Manton kick good	17	10
2	2:47	4	75	1:29	New Mexico State	Larry Rose III 64-yard touchdown run, Maxwell Johnson kick good	17	17
2	0:00	6	46	0:32	Louisiana–Monroe	22-yard field goal by Justin Manton	20	17
3	1:46	1	1		Louisiana–Monroe	Mitch Lane 1-yard blocked punt return, Justin Manton kick good	27	17
4	12:05	9	66	3:29	Louisiana–Monroe	21-yard field goal by Justin Manton	30	17
"TOP" = time of possession. For other American football terms, see Glossary of American football.							30	17

=== At Georgia Southern ===
Louisiana–Monroe @ Georgia Southern

Team	1	2	3	4	Total
Warhawks	0	7	6	3	16
• Eagles	3	0	6	13	22

- Date: November 29
- Location: Paulson Stadium
  Statesboro, GA
- Game start: 5:00 p.m. CST
- Elapsed time: 3:28
- Game attendance: 16,283
- Game weather: Clear • Temperature: 58 °F (14 °C) • Wind: S 4 MPH
- Referee: Tony Backert
- TV announcers (ESPN3): Matt Stewart, Rocky Boiman

Statistics	ULM	GASO
First downs	16	19
Total yards	341	469
Rushing yards	19	333
Passing yards	322	136
Turnovers	1	0
Time of possession	23:27	36:33

Team	Category	Player	Statistics
Louisiana–Monroe	Passing	Pete Thomas	28/45, 307 yards, 2 TD
Louisiana–Monroe	Rushing	Centarius Donald	5 rushes, 30 yards
Louisiana–Monroe	Receiving	Rashon Ceaser	8 receptions, 138 yards, TD
Georgia Southern	Passing	Kevin Ellison	8/19, 136 yards
Georgia Southern	Rushing	Kevin Ellison	20 rushes, 104 yards, TD
Georgia Southern	Receiving	Zach Walker	3 receptions, 39 yards

In their twelfth game of the season, the Warhawks lost, 22–16 to the Georgia Southern Eagles.

Scoring summary

Quarter	Time	Drive			Team	Scoring information	Score	
Quarter	Time	Plays	Yards	TOP	Team	Scoring information	Louisiana–Monroe	Georgia Southern
1	3:38	16	62	8:49	Georgia Southern	27-yard field goal by Alex Hanks	0	3
2	6:22	2	77	0:44	Louisiana–Monroe	Rashon Ceaser 63-yard touchdown reception from Pete Thomas, Justin Manton kick good	7	3
3	4:13	6	74	2:26	Georgia Southern	Kevin Ellison 10-yard touchdown run, Alex Hanks kick failed	7	9
3	2:40	5	50	1:33	Louisiana–Monroe	Ajalen Holley 36-yard touchdown reception from Pete Thomas, 2-point run failed	13	9
4	8:52	11	40	4:35	Georgia Southern	Matt Breida 1-yard touchdown run, Younghoe Koo kick failed	13	15
4	5:28	3	59	1:16	Georgia Southern	L.A. Ramsby 7-yard touchdown run, Younghoe Koo kick good	13	22
4	2:04	12	34	3:12	Louisiana–Monroe	47-yard field goal by Justin Manton	16	22
"TOP" = time of possession. For other American football terms, see Glossary of American football.							16	22
