= 2014 New Mexico State Aggies football team =

American college football season

2014 New Mexico State Aggies football
- Conference: Sun Belt Conference
- Record: 2–10 (1–7 Sun Belt)
- Head coach: Doug Martin (2nd season)
- Offensive coordinator: Gregg Brandon (2nd season)
- Offensive scheme: Air raid
- Defensive coordinator: Larry Coyer (1st season)
- Base defense: 4–3
- Home stadium: Aggie Memorial Stadium

2014 Sun Belt Conference football standings
	Conf.			Overall
Team	W		L	W		L
Georgia Southern * $	8	–	0	9	–	3
Louisiana–Lafayette ***	5	–	1	7	–	4
Appalachian State *	6	–	2	7	–	5
Texas State	5	–	3	7	–	5
Arkansas State	5	–	3	7	–	6
South Alabama	5	–	3	6	–	7
Louisiana–Monroe	3	–	5	4	–	8
Troy	3	–	5	3	–	9
New Mexico State	1	–	7	2	–	10
Idaho **	1	–	7	1	–	10
Georgia State	0	–	8	1	–	11
$ – Conference champion; * – Appalachian State and Georgia Southern ineligible for postseason play due to FCS-to-FBS transition rules ** – Idaho ineligible for postseason play due to APR penalties *** – Louisiana–Lafayette vacated 2 wins due to NCAA violations

The 2014 New Mexico State Aggies football team represented New Mexico State University as a member of the Sun Belt Conference during the 2014 NCAA Division I FBS football season. Led by second-year head coach Doug Martin, the Aggies compiled an overall record of 2–10 with a mark of 1–7 in conference play, tying for ninth place in the Sun Belt. New Mexico State played home games at Aggie Memorial Stadium in Las Cruces, New Mexico.

This was New Mexico State's first season since 2004 as a Sun Belt member.

== Schedule ==
Date	Time	Opponent	Site	TV	Result	Attendance
August 30	6:00 pm	Cal Poly*	Aggie Memorial Stadium; Las Cruces, NM	AV	W 28–10	13,772
September 6	12:00 pm	at Georgia State	Georgia Dome; Atlanta, GA	ESPN3	W 34–31	10,126
September 13	6:00 pm	at UTEP*	Sun Bowl; El Paso, TX (Battle of I-10)	ASN	L 24–42	32,979
September 20	6:00 pm	New Mexico*	Aggie Memorial Stadium; Las Cruces, NM (Rio Grande Rivalry)	AV	L 35–38	24,651
September 27	5:30 pm	at No. 17 LSU*	Tiger Stadium; Baton Rouge, LA	SECN	L 7–63	101,987
October 4	6:00 pm	Georgia Southern	Aggie Memorial Stadium; Las Cruces, NM	AV	L 28–36	10,256
October 11	1:00 pm	at Troy	Veterans Memorial Stadium; Troy, AL	ESPN3	L 24–41	17,628
October 18	3:00 pm	at Idaho	Kibbie Dome; Moscow, ID	ESPN3	L 17–29	15,207
November 1	6:00 pm	Texas State	Aggie Memorial Stadium; Las Cruces, NM	AV	L 29–37	8,623
November 8	6:00 pm	Louisiana–Lafayette^{†}	Aggie Memorial Stadium; Las Cruces, NM	AV	L 16–44	10,299
November 22	6:00 pm	Louisiana–Monroe	Aggie Memorial Stadium; Las Cruces, NM	AV	L 17–30	6,011
November 29	1:00 pm	at Arkansas State	Centennial Bank Stadium; Jonesboro, AR	ESPN3	L 35–68	21,043
*Non-conference game; ^{†}Homecoming; Rankings from AP Poll released prior to the game; All times are in Mountain time

*-AggieVision games aired on Altitude or Altitude 2, Comcast New Mexico, ESPN3, and KVIA substations.

== Roster ==
2014 New Mexico State Aggies football team roster
Players
Coaches
Offense

Pos.	#	Name	Class
QB	1	Nick Jeanty	Fr
WR	2	Gregory Hogan	Fr
QB	3	Andrew Allen	Fr
QB	4	Cassius Corley	Fr
WR	5	Joseph Matthews	Sr
WR	6	Joshua Bowen	Jr
WR	7	Adam Shapiro	Sr
WR	9	Rayvean Moore	So
QB	10	Jalen Jones	Fr
WR	11	Jordan Bergstrom	Sr
RB	12	Larry Rose III	Fr
QB	14	Jason Fitzpatrick	So
TE	15	Anthony Joyner	Sr
WR	17	Jerrel Brown	Sr
QB	18	Tyler Rogers	So
WR	19	Teldrick Morgan	So
RB	21	Brandon Betancourt	Sr
RB	22	Xavier Hall	So
RB	24	Marquette Washington	Fr
WR	28	Cyrus Chenault	Sr
RB	37	Terrance Yelder	So
TE	40	Robert Wagner	So
OL	50	Abram Holland	So
OL	51	Thomas McGwire	Fr
OL	54	Spence Ueli-Faatoalia	Fr
C	55	Valerian Ume-Ezeoke	Sr
OL	56	Matt Ramando	Jr
OL	58	Dezmand Candielaria	Fr
OL	62	Isaiah Folasa-Lutui	Jr
OL	63	Nick Ledoux	Fr
OL	65	Ryan Arbelaez	Sr
OL	69	Alexander Trujillo	Jr
OL	70	Andy Cunningham	Jr
OL	71	Dustin Lamb	Fr
OL	72	Peter Foreman	So
OL	74	Jamin Smith	Fr
OL	75	Antonio Ortega	So
OL	77	Houston Clemente	Jr
WR	80	Iman Chatman	Fr
WR	81	Brenden Barker	Fr
WR	82	Ty Atencio	Fr
TE	85	Preston Schollander	Fr
WR	87	Ralston Compton	Fr
WR	88	Jason Onunkwo	Fr
TE	89	Andrew Dean	Sr

Defense

Pos.	#	Name	Class
DB	1	Travaughn Colwell	Sr
LB	3	Derek Ibekwe	Fr
DB	4	Winston Rose	Sr
DB	6	King Davis III	So
DB	8	Jacob Nwangwa	Fr
DB	10	Kedeem Thomas-Davis	Jr
DB	11	Tre Wilcoxen	Fr
DB	12	Charles Smith	Fr
LB	13	Clint Barnard	Sr
DB	14	Jaden Wright	Fr
DB	16	Kawe Johnson	So
DB	19	Adaryan Jones	Fr
LB	20	Jermichael Selders	Jr
DB	23	Jerrion Burton	Fr
DB	24	Michael Lara	Fr
DB	25	Samuel Oyenguga	So
DB	29	Lewis Hill	Jr
DB	30	Otis Ricks	Fr
DB	31	Dalton Herrington	Fr
LB	32	Dalton Rocha	Fr
LB	34	Jesse Forte	Sr
DB	35	Malik Demby	Fr
DE	38	William Hollingsworth	So
LB	41	McKeithan Smith	So
LB	42	J. B. Copeland	Fr
LB	44	Will Clement	Fr
LB	46	Dior Moore	Sr
DE	48	Kalei Auelua	So
LB	48	Billy Nipp	Fr
DB	49	Chris Acosta	Fr
DE	52	Jay Eakins	Sr
LB	53	Rodney Butler	So
LB	57	Noah Brown	So
DL	59	Brandon Agomuo	Fr
DL	67	Kortland Busby	Fr
DL	73	Keanu Higgins	Fr
DL	93	Drew James	Jr
DL	95	Stody Bradley	Fr
DE	98	Josh Gibbs	Jr
DL	99	Stephen Meredith	Jr

Special teams

Pos.	#	Name	Class
K	18	Maxwell Johnson	Sr
LS	47	Andrew Kenney	So
P	85	Stephen Witkowski	Jr
K	96	Alex Louthan	Fr

Head coach

- Doug Martin (offensive coordinator/quarterbacks)

Coordinators/assistant coaches

- Larry Coyer (defensive coordinator)
- Gregg Brandon (offensive coordinator/quarterbacks)
- Will Martin (secondary)
- Walt Wells (offensive line)
- R Todd Littlejohn (wide receivers/recruiting coordinator)
- Kerry Locklin (defensive line)
- Kevin McKeethan (tight ends)
- Zane Vance (linebackers)
- Shaun Johnson (running backs)
- Kevin Tibolt (director of football operations)
- Don Decker (director of sport performance)
- Matt Christian (graduate assistant)
- Izaiah Williams (graduate assistant)
- Tom Berry (graduate assistant)
- Kai Brown (graduate assistant)
- Alex Nederhoff (video coordinator)
- Jake Crawford (strength & conditioning coaching assistant)
- Tanner Maher (strength & conditioning coaching assistant)
- Zach Witherspoon (strength & conditioning intern)
- Dominic Moreno (associate athletic trainer)
- Martha Valdez (administrative assistant)

Legend

- (C) Team captain
- (S) Suspended
- (I) Ineligible
- Injured
- Redshirt

Roster
Last update: December 21, 2015

== Game summaries ==
=== Cal Poly ===
	1	2	3	4	Total
Mustangs	7	3	0	0	10
Aggies	7	7	7	7	28

Statistics	CP	NMSU
First downs	14	21
Total yards	265	355
Rushing yards	259	197
Passing yards	6	158
Turnovers	2	1
Time of possession	25:52	34:08

Team	Category	Player	Statistics
Cal Poly	Passing	Dano Graves	1/3, 4 yards
Cal Poly	Rushing	Kori Garcia	11 rushes, 84 yards
Cal Poly	Receiving	Chris Nicholls	1 reception, 4 yards
New Mexico State	Passing	Tyler Rogers	18/27, 158 yards, 2 TD, INT
New Mexico State	Rushing	Larry Rose III	30 rushes, 149 yards, TD
New Mexico State	Receiving	Teldrick Morgan	6 receptions, 51 yards, TD

=== At Georgia State ===
	1	2	3	4	Total
Aggies	0	10	7	17	34
Panthers	10	7	7	7	31

Statistics	NMSU	GAST
First downs	26	23
Total yards	435	456
Rushing yards	194	162
Passing yards	241	294
Turnovers	3	4
Time of possession	30:34	29:26

Team	Category	Player	Statistics
New Mexico State	Passing	Tyler Rogers	25/44, 241 yards, 3 TD, INT
New Mexico State	Rushing	Larry Rose III	17 rushes, 89 yards
New Mexico State	Receiving	Teldrick Morgan	8 receptions, 89 yards, TD
Georgia State	Passing	Nick Arbuckle	21/37, 294 yards, TD, 2 INT
Georgia State	Rushing	Krysten Hammon	25 rushes, 123 yards, 2 TD
Georgia State	Receiving	Avery Sweeting	8 receptions, 94 yards

=== At UTEP ===
	1	2	3	4	Total
Aggies	7	3	0	14	24
Miners	7	14	0	21	42

Statistics	NMSU	UTEP
First downs	20	26
Total yards	425	470
Rushing yards	90	344
Passing yards	335	126
Turnovers	2	1
Time of possession	20:34	39:26

Team	Category	Player	Statistics
New Mexico State	Passing	Tyler Rogers	22/40, 324 yards, 2 TD, 2 INT
New Mexico State	Rushing	Xavier Hall	10 rushes, 44 yards
New Mexico State	Receiving	Teldrick Morgan	8 receptions, 202 yards, TD
UTEP	Passing	Jameill Showers	13/16, 126 yards, TD, INT
UTEP	Rushing	Aaron Jones	25 rushes, 168 yards, 2 TD
UTEP	Receiving	Ian Hamilton	3 receptions, 45 yards

=== New Mexico ===
	1	2	3	4	Total
Lobos	7	14	3	14	38
Aggies	0	14	14	7	35

Statistics	UNM	NMSU
First downs	25	29
Total yards	499	520
Rushing yards	432	187
Passing yards	67	333
Turnovers	1	2
Time of possession	32:04	27:56

Team	Category	Player	Statistics
New Mexico	Passing	Clayton Mitchem	2/4, 20 yards
New Mexico	Rushing	Crusoe Gongbay	16 rushes, 139 yards, TD
New Mexico	Receiving	Jeric Magnant	4 receptions, 42 yards, TD
New Mexico State	Passing	Tyler Rogers	32/47, 333 yards, 2 TD, 2 INT
New Mexico State	Rushing	Xavier Hall	15 rushes, 61 yards, 2 TD
New Mexico State	Receiving	Teldrick Morgan	9 receptions, 122 yards

=== At No. 17 LSU ===
	1	2	3	4	Total
Aggies	0	7	0	0	7
No. 17 Tigers	14	28	14	7	63

Statistics	NMSU	LSU
First downs	13	29
Total yards	274	563
Rushing yards	172	363
Passing yards	102	200
Turnovers	4	4
Time of possession	24:36	35:24

Team	Category	Player	Statistics
New Mexico State	Passing	Tyler Rogers	14/31, 86 yards, 2 INT
New Mexico State	Rushing	Andrew Allen	5 rushes, 113 yards, TD
New Mexico State	Receiving	Teldric Morgan	5 receptions, 44 yards
LSU	Passing	Brandon Harris	11/14, 178 yards, 3 TD
LSU	Rushing	Leonard Fournette	18 rushes, 122 yards, 2 TD
LSU	Receiving	Malachi Dupre	3 receptions, 54 yards, TD

=== Georgia Southern ===
	1	2	3	4	Total
Eagles	0	12	17	7	36
Aggies	14	0	0	14	28

Statistics	GASO	NMSU
First downs	22	30
Total yards	437	517
Rushing yards	419	183
Passing yards	18	334
Turnovers	1	4
Time of possession	31:41	28:19

Team	Category	Player	Statistics
Georgia Southern	Passing	Kevin Ellison	3/13, 18 yards
Georgia Southern	Rushing	Kevin Ellison	18 rushes, 159 yards, 2 TD
Georgia Southern	Receiving	B. J. Johnson III	3 receptions, 18 yards
New Mexico State	Passing	Tyler Rogers	34/48, 329 yards, 3 INT
New Mexico State	Rushing	Brandon Betancourt	11 rushes, 65 yards, 2 TD
New Mexico State	Receiving	Teldrick Morgan	10 receptions, 100 yards

=== At Troy ===
	1	2	3	4	Total
Aggies	0	7	10	7	24
Trojans	10	10	7	14	41

Statistics	NMSU	TROY
First downs	20	27
Total yards	395	571
Rushing yards	123	360
Passing yards	272	211
Turnovers	4	2
Time of possession	24:59	35:01

Team	Category	Player	Statistics
New Mexico State	Passing	Tyler Rogers	22/33, 272 yards, 2 TD, 2 INT
New Mexico State	Rushing	Larry Rose III	18 rushes, 85 yards, TD
New Mexico State	Receiving	Teldric Morgan	7 receptions, 67 yards, TD
Troy	Passing	Brandon Silvers	23/30, 211 yards, TD, INT
Troy	Rushing	Brandon Burks	10 rushes, 176 yards
Troy	Receiving	Chandler Worthy	4 receptions, 51 yards, TD

=== At Idaho ===
	1	2	3	4	Total
Aggies	7	3	0	7	17
Vandals	14	6	0	9	29

Statistics	NMSU	IDHO
First downs	12	30
Total yards	314	536
Rushing yards	214	310
Passing yards	100	226
Turnovers	4	2
Time of possession	22:13	37:47

Team	Category	Player	Statistics
New Mexico State	Passing	Andrew Allen	6/11, 88 yards, INT
New Mexico State	Rushing	Larry Rose III	17 rushes, 155 yards, 2 TD
New Mexico State	Receiving	Adam Shapiro	2 receptions, 58 yards
Idaho	Passing	Chad Chalich	18/32, 192 yards, TD, INT
Idaho	Rushing	Jerrel Brown	23 rushes, 151 yards, TD
Idaho	Receiving	Joshua McCain	11 receptions, 139 yards, TD

=== Texas State ===
	1	2	3	4	Total
Bobcats	17	0	20	0	37
Aggies	7	7	7	8	29

Statistics	TXST	NMSU
First downs	21	32
Total yards	430	639
Rushing yards	287	235
Passing yards	143	404
Turnovers	0	2
Time of possession	28:47	31:13

Team	Category	Player	Statistics
Texas State	Passing	Tyler Jones	17/30, 143 yards, TD
Texas State	Rushing	Tyler Jones	9 rushes, 82 yards
Texas State	Receiving	Jafus Gaines	7 receptions, 55 yards
New Mexico State	Passing	Tyler Rogers	36/52, 404 yards, 3 TD, 2 INT
New Mexico State	Rushing	Larry Rose III	24 rushes, 181 yards, TD
New Mexico State	Receiving	Jerrel Brown	7 receptions, 139 yards, TD

=== Louisiana–Lafayette ===
	1	2	3	4	Total
Ragin' Cajuns	7	14	9	14	44
Aggies	3	0	6	7	16

Statistics	ULL	NMSU
First downs	22	14
Total yards	402	307
Rushing yards	244	103
Passing yards	158	204
Turnovers	0	4
Time of possession	36:17	23:43

Team	Category	Player	Statistics
Louisiana–Lafayette	Passing	Terrance Broadway	12/23, 158 yards, 3 TD
Louisiana–Lafayette	Rushing	Elijah McGuire	26 rushes, 136 yards, TD
Louisiana–Lafayette	Receiving	James Butler	5 receptions, 95 yards
New Mexico State	Passing	Tyler Rogers	19/34, 204 yards, TD, 3 INT
New Mexico State	Rushing	Xavier Hall	19 rushes, 47 yards, TD
New Mexico State	Receiving	Teldrick Morgan	8 receptions, 117 yards, TD

=== Louisiana–Monroe ===
	1	2	3	4	Total
Warhawks	10	10	7	3	30
Aggies	0	17	0	0	17

Statistics	ULM	NMSU
First downs	19	19
Total yards	420	378
Rushing yards	70	276
Passing yards	350	102
Turnovers	2	2
Time of possession	29:03	30:57

Team	Category	Player	Statistics
Louisiana–Monroe	Passing	Pete Thomas	35/50, 350 yards, TD, INT
Louisiana–Monroe	Rushing	Centarius Donald	13 rushes, 35 yards, TD
Louisiana–Monroe	Receiving	Kenzee Jackson	13 receptions, 108 yards
New Mexico State	Passing	Tyler Rogers	15/32, 102 yards, INT
New Mexico State	Rushing	Larry Rose III	35 rushes, 229 yards, 2 TD
New Mexico State	Receiving	Teldric Morgan	4 receptions, 41 yards

=== At Arkansas State ===
	1	2	3	4	Total
Aggies	7	14	7	7	35
Red Wolves	7	20	21	20	68

Statistics	NMSU	ARST
First downs	22	34
Total yards	492	764
Rushing yards	178	469
Passing yards	314	295
Turnovers	2	2
Time of possession	31:44	27:26

Team	Category	Player	Statistics
New Mexico State	Passing	Tyler Rogers	28/43, 314 yards, 4 TD, 2 INT
New Mexico State	Rushing	Larry Rose III	21 rushes, 137 yards, TD
New Mexico State	Receiving	Gregory Hogan	9 receptions, 162 yards, 3 TD
Arkansas State	Passing	Fredi Knighton	15/21, 296 yards, 2 TD, 2 INT
Arkansas State	Rushing	Fredi Knighton	15 rushes, 153 yards, 2 TD
Arkansas State	Receiving	Tres Houston	4 receptions, 102 yards
