= 2014 Appalachian State Mountaineers football team =

American college football season

2014 Appalachian State Mountaineers football
- Conference: Sun Belt Conference
- Record: 7–5 (6–2 Sun Belt)
- Head coach: Scott Satterfield (2nd season)
- Co-offensive coordinators: Frank Ponce (2nd season); Dwayne Ledford (2nd season)
- Offensive scheme: Spread option
- Defensive coordinator: Nate Woody (2nd season)
- Base defense: 3–4
- Home stadium: Kidd Brewer Stadium

2014 Sun Belt Conference football standings
	Conf.			Overall
Team	W		L	W		L
Georgia Southern * $	8	–	0	9	–	3
Louisiana–Lafayette ***	5	–	1	7	–	4
Appalachian State *	6	–	2	7	–	5
Texas State	5	–	3	7	–	5
Arkansas State	5	–	3	7	–	6
South Alabama	5	–	3	6	–	7
Louisiana–Monroe	3	–	5	4	–	8
Troy	3	–	5	3	–	9
New Mexico State	1	–	7	2	–	10
Idaho **	1	–	7	1	–	10
Georgia State	0	–	8	1	–	11
$ – Conference champion; * – Appalachian State and Georgia Southern ineligible for postseason play due to FCS-to-FBS transition rules ** – Idaho ineligible for postseason play due to APR penalties *** – Louisiana–Lafayette vacated 2 wins due to NCAA violations

The 2014 Appalachian State Mountaineers football team represented Appalachian State University in the 2014 NCAA Division I FBS football season. They were led by second-year head coach Scott Satterfield and played their home games at Kidd Brewer Stadium. This season was the Mountaineers first season in the Sun Belt Conference. In their second year of their two-year FCS-to-FBS transition, the Mountaineers were eligible for the conference championship; however, they were not bowl-eligible.

After starting the season 1–5, the Mountaineers ended their first FBS season with a 6-game winning streak, finishing 7–5 overall and 6–2 in Sun Belt play with upset wins over last year's Sun Belt co-champions Arkansas State and Louisiana–Lafayette, good for third place in the Sun Belt.

== Schedule ==
Date	Time	Opponent	Site	TV	Result	Attendance
August 30	Noon	at Michigan*	Michigan Stadium; Ann Arbor, MI	ESPN2	L 14–52	106,811
September 6	6:00 p.m.	Campbell*	Kidd Brewer Stadium; Boone, NC	ESPN3	W 66–0	25,861
September 20	7:00 p.m.	at Southern Miss*	M. M. Roberts Stadium; Hattiesburg, MS	ASN	L 20–21	21,836
September 25	7:30 p.m.	at Georgia Southern	Paulson Stadium; Statesboro, GA (rivalry)	ESPNU	L 14–34	24,535
October 4	6:00 p.m.	South Alabama	Kidd Brewer Stadium; Boone, NC	SBN	L 21–47	24,215
October 11	3:30 p.m.	Liberty*^{†}	Kidd Brewer Stadium; Boone, NC	ESPN3	L 48–55 ^{OT}	26,058
October 18	3:00 p.m.	at Troy	Veterans Memorial Stadium; Troy, AL	ESPN3	W 53–14	15,664
November 1	3:30 p.m.	Georgia State	Kidd Brewer Stadium; Boone, NC	ESPN3	W 44–0	22,643
November 8	3:30 p.m.	Louisiana–Monroe	Kidd Brewer Stadium; Boone, NC	ESPN3	W 31–29	20,497
November 15	3:00 p.m.	at Arkansas State	Centennial Bank Stadium; Jonesboro, AR	ESPN3	W 37–32	20,016
November 22	2:00 p.m.	at Louisiana–Lafayette	Cajun Field; Lafayette, LA	ESPN3	W 35–16	20,638
November 29	2:00 p.m.	Idaho	Kidd Brewer Stadium; Boone, NC	ESPN3	W 45–28	19,721
*Non-conference game; ^{†}Homecoming; All times are in Eastern time

Schedule source:

== Game summaries ==
=== Michigan ===
	1	2	3	4	Total
Mountaineers	0	0	7	7	14
Wolverines	14	21	14	3	52

=== Campbell ===
	1	2	3	4	Total
Fighting Camels	0	0	0	0	0
Mountaineers	10	35	14	7	66

=== Southern Miss ===
	1	2	3	4	Total
Mountaineers	0	7	0	13	20
Golden Eagles	7	7	0	7	21

=== Georgia Southern ===
	1	2	3	4	Total
Mountaineers	0	14	0	0	14
Eagles	10	14	0	10	34

=== South Alabama ===
	1	2	3	4	Total
Jaguars	10	10	20	7	47
Mountaineers	0	7	0	14	21

=== Liberty ===
	1	2	3	4	OT	Total
Flames	14	14	13	7	7	55
Mountaineers	7	17	16	8	0	48

=== Troy ===
	1	2	3	4	Total
Mountaineers	17	9	14	13	53
Trojans	7	7	0	0	14

=== Georgia State ===
	1	2	3	4	Total
Panthers	0	0	0	0	0
Mountaineers	13	14	10	7	44

=== Louisiana–Monroe ===
	1	2	3	4	Total
Warhawks	6	14	3	6	29
Mountaineers	7	14	0	10	31

=== Arkansas State ===
	1	2	3	4	Total
Mountaineers	0	13	14	10	37
Red Wolves	13	7	0	12	32

=== Louisiana–Lafayette ===
	1	2	3	4	Total
Mountaineers	14	0	7	14	35
Ragin' Cajuns	3	10	3	0	16

=== Idaho ===
	1	2	3	4	Total
Vandals	9	6	0	13	28
Mountaineers	10	14	7	14	45
