= 2014 South Alabama Jaguars football team =

American college football season

2014 South Alabama Jaguars football

Camellia Bowl, L 28–33 vs. Bowling Green
- Conference: Sun Belt Conference
- Record: 6–7 (5–3 Sun Belt)
- Head coach: Joey Jones (6th season)
- Offensive coordinator: Robert Matthews (3rd season; regular season); Bryant Vincent (interim; bowl game)
- Offensive scheme: Multiple
- Defensive coordinator: Travis Pearson (1st season)
- Base defense: 3–4
- Home stadium: Ladd–Peebles Stadium

2014 Sun Belt Conference football standings
	Conf.			Overall
Team	W		L	W		L
Georgia Southern * $	8	–	0	9	–	3
Louisiana–Lafayette ***	5	–	1	7	–	4
Appalachian State *	6	–	2	7	–	5
Texas State	5	–	3	7	–	5
Arkansas State	5	–	3	7	–	6
South Alabama	5	–	3	6	–	7
Louisiana–Monroe	3	–	5	4	–	8
Troy	3	–	5	3	–	9
New Mexico State	1	–	7	2	–	10
Idaho **	1	–	7	1	–	10
Georgia State	0	–	8	1	–	11
$ – Conference champion; * – Appalachian State and Georgia Southern ineligible for postseason play due to FCS-to-FBS transition rules ** – Idaho ineligible for postseason play due to APR penalties *** – Louisiana–Lafayette vacated 2 wins due to NCAA violations

The 2014 South Alabama Jaguars football team represented the University of South Alabama in the 2014 NCAA Division I FBS football season. They were led by sixth-year head coach Joey Jones and played their home games at Ladd–Peebles Stadium in Mobile, Alabama as a member of the Sun Belt Conference. They finished the season 6–7, 5–3 in Sun Belt play to finish in a three-way tie for fourth place. In only their second year of bowl eligibility, they were invited to the Camellia Bowl, where they lost to Bowling Green.

== Schedule ==
Date	Time	Opponent	Site	TV	Result	Attendance
September 6	1:00 p.m.	at Kent State*	Dix Stadium; Kent, OH	ESPN3	W 23–13	15,355
September 13	3:00 p.m.	Mississippi State*	Ladd–Peebles Stadium; Mobile, AL	ESPNews	L 3–35	38,129
September 20	5:30 p.m.	Georgia Southern	Ladd–Peebles Stadium; Mobile, AL	ESPN3	L 6–28	11,348
September 27	4:00 p.m.	at Idaho	Kibbie Dome; Moscow, ID	ESPN3	W 34–10	14,887
October 4	5:00 p.m.	at Appalachian State	Kidd Brewer Stadium; Boone, NC	ESPN3	W 47–21	24,215
October 18	6:30 p.m.	Georgia State^{†}	Ladd–Peebles Stadium; Mobile, AL	ESPN3	W 30–27	13,186
October 24	6:30 p.m.	Troy	Ladd–Peebles Stadium; Mobile, AL (rivalry)	ESPNU	W 27–13	17,146
November 1	4:00 p.m.	at Louisiana–Lafayette	Cajun Field; Lafayette, LA	ESPN3	L 9–19	25,861
November 8	2:00 p.m.	at Arkansas State	Centennial Bank Stadium; Jonesboro, AR	ESPN3	L 10–45	23,615
November 15	6:30 p.m.	Texas State	Ladd–Peebles Stadium; Mobile, AL	ESPN3	W 24–20	10,289
November 22	11:00 a.m.	at South Carolina*	Williams-Brice Stadium; Columbia, SC	SECRN	L 12–37	78,201
November 28	2:00 p.m.	Navy*	Ladd–Peebles Stadium; Mobile, AL	ESPN3	L 40–42	14,571
December 20	8:15 p.m.	vs. Bowling Green*	Cramton Bowl; Montgomery, AL (Camellia Bowl)	ESPN	L 28–33	20,256
*Non-conference game; ^{†}Homecoming; All times are in Central time

== Game summaries ==
=== Kent State ===
	1	2	3	4	Total
Jaguars	9	7	0	7	23
Golden Flashes	0	6	0	7	13

=== Mississippi State ===
	1	2	3	4	Total
Bulldogs	7	21	7	0	35
Jaguars	0	3	0	0	3

=== Georgia Southern ===
	1	2	3	4	Total
Eagles	7	7	7	7	28
Jaguars	0	6	0	0	6

=== Idaho ===
	1	2	3	4	Total
Jaguars	14	6	7	7	34
Vandals	0	0	10	0	10

=== Appalachian State ===
	1	2	3	4	Total
Jaguars	10	10	20	7	47
Mountaineers	0	7	0	14	21

=== Georgia State ===
	1	2	3	4	Total
Panthers	7	7	7	6	27
Jaguars	10	0	10	10	30

=== Troy ===
	1	2	3	4	Total
Trojans	0	3	3	7	13
Jaguars	10	0	14	3	27

=== Louisiana–Lafayette ===
	1	2	3	4	Total
Jaguars	0	9	0	0	9
Ragin' Cajuns	3	3	3	10	19

=== Arkansas State ===
	1	2	3	4	Total
Jaguars	3	0	0	7	10
Red Wolves	7	17	14	7	45

=== Texas State ===
	1	2	3	4	Total
Bobcats	10	7	0	3	20
Jaguars	0	10	7	7	24

=== South Carolina ===
	1	2	3	4	Total
Jaguars	3	6	0	3	12
Gamecocks	10	7	6	14	37

=== Navy ===
	1	2	3	4	Total
Midshipmen	7	14	14	7	42
Jaguars	17	0	3	20	40

=== Bowling Green–Camellia Bowl ===
	1	2	3	4	Total
Jaguars	7	0	7	14	28
Falcons	14	6	7	6	33
