= 2014 Georgia State Panthers football team =

American college football season

2014 Georgia State Panthers football
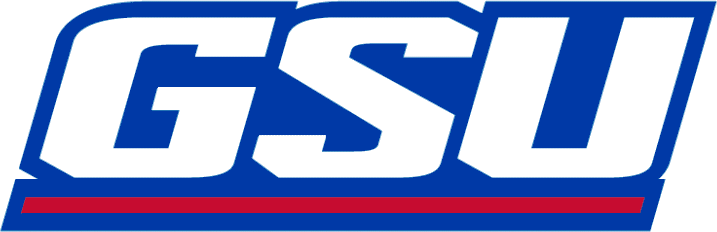
- Conference: Sun Belt Conference
- Record: 1–11 (0–8 Sun Belt)
- Head coach: Trent Miles (2nd season)
- Offensive coordinator: Jeff Jagodzinski (2nd season)
- Offensive scheme: Multiple
- Defensive coordinator: Jesse Minter (2nd season)
- Base defense: 4–3
- Home stadium: Georgia Dome

2014 Sun Belt Conference football standings
	Conf.			Overall
Team	W		L	W		L
Georgia Southern * $	8	–	0	9	–	3
Louisiana–Lafayette ***	5	–	1	7	–	4
Appalachian State *	6	–	2	7	–	5
Texas State	5	–	3	7	–	5
Arkansas State	5	–	3	7	–	6
South Alabama	5	–	3	6	–	7
Louisiana–Monroe	3	–	5	4	–	8
Troy	3	–	5	3	–	9
New Mexico State	1	–	7	2	–	10
Idaho **	1	–	7	1	–	10
Georgia State	0	–	8	1	–	11
$ – Conference champion; * – Appalachian State and Georgia Southern ineligible for postseason play due to FCS-to-FBS transition rules ** – Idaho ineligible for postseason play due to APR penalties *** – Louisiana–Lafayette vacated 2 wins due to NCAA violations

The 2014 Georgia State Panthers football team represented Georgia State University (GSU) in the 2014 NCAA Division I FBS football season. The Panthers were led by second year head coach Trent Miles and played their home games at the Georgia Dome. The 2014 season was the Panthers' second in the Sun Belt Conference and the first season they were eligible to compete for the Sun Belt title and post season play at the FBS level. They finished the season 1–11, 0–8 in Sun Belt play to finish in last place.

== Coaching staff ==
Name	Position	Season at Georgia St	Alma mater
Trent Miles	Head coach	2	Indiana State (1987)
Harold Etheridge	Assistant head coach, Offensive line	2	Western New Mexico (1982)
Jeff Jagodzinski	Offensive coordinator	2	Wisconsin–Whitewater (1985)
Jesse Minter	Defensive coordinator	2	Mount St. Joseph (2005)
Luke Huard	Assistant coach, Quarterbacks	2	North Carolina (2002)
Shannon Jackson	Assistant coach, Offensive line	2	Indiana State (2000)
Brock Lough	Graduate Assistant, Running Backs	2	Indiana State (2012)
J. D. Williams	Assistant coach, Secondary	2	Fresno State (1990)
P. J. Volker	Assistant coach, Linebackers	2	Mount St. Joseph (2005)

== Schedule ==
Date	Time	Opponent	Site	TV	Result	Attendance
August 27	7:00 p.m.	Abilene Christian*	Georgia Dome; Atlanta, GA	ESPNU	W 38–37	10,140
September 6	2:00 p.m.	New Mexico State	Georgia Dome; Atlanta, GA	ESPN3	L 31–34	10,126
September 13	2:00 p.m.	Air Force*	Georgia Dome; Atlanta, GA	ESPN3	L 38–48	16,836
September 20	6:00 p.m.	at Washington*	Husky Stadium; Seattle, WA	P12N	L 14–45	64,608
October 4	7:00 p.m.	at Louisiana–Lafayette	Cajun Field; Lafayette, LA	ESPN3	L 31–34	24,816
October 11	2:00 p.m.	Arkansas State^{†}	Georgia Dome; Atlanta, GA	ESPN3	L 10–52	10,196
October 18	7:30 p.m.	at South Alabama	Ladd–Peebles Stadium; Mobile, AL	ESPN3	L 27–30	13,186
October 25	2:00 p.m.	Georgia Southern	Georgia Dome; Atlanta, GA (rivalry)	ESPN3	L 31–69	28,427
November 1	3:30 p.m.	at Appalachian State	Kidd Brewer Stadium; Boone, NC	ESPN3	L 0–44	22,643
November 8	3:00 p.m.	at Troy	Veterans Memorial Stadium; Troy, AL	ESPN3	L 21–45	16,148
November 22	3:30 p.m.	at Clemson*	Memorial Stadium; Clemson, SC	ACCRSN	L 0–28	77,693
November 29	2:00 p.m.	Texas State	Georgia Dome; Atlanta, GA	ESPN3	L 31–54	14,312
*Non-conference game; ^{†}Homecoming; All times are in Eastern time

== Game summaries ==
=== Abilene Christian ===
Abilene Christian at Georgia State

Team	1	2	3	4	Total
Wildcats	3	13	14	7	37
• Panthers	7	14	0	17	38

- Date: August 27
- Location: Georgia Dome
  Atlanta, Georgia
- Game start: 7:05 p.m. EST
- Elapsed time: 3:43
- Game attendance: 10,140
- Game weather: Dome
- Referee: Charles Lewis
- TV announcers (ESPNU): Ryan Ruocco & Charles Arbuckle

Scoring summary
1	8:58	ACU	25-yard field goal by Nik Grau	ACU 3–0
1	2:31	GSU	Joel Ruiz 34-yard touchdown reception from Nick Arbuckle, Wil Lutz kick good	GSU 7–3
2	12:00	GSU	Jonathan Lytle 2-yard touchdown run, Lutz kick good	GSU 14–3
2	7:31	ACU	42-yard field goal by Grau	GSU 14–6
2	3:52	ACU	Cedric Gilbert 60-yard touchdown reception from Parker McKenzie, Grau kick good	GSU 14–13
2	1:11	ACU	33-yard field goal by Grau	ACU 16–14
2	0:14	GSU	Avery Sweeting 41-yard touchdown reception from Arbuckle, Lutz kick good	GSU 21–16
3	6:27	ACU	Jamie Walker 23-yard touchdown reception from McKenzie, Grau kick good	ACU 23–21
3	1:41	ACU	Jace Hudson 24-yard touchdown reception from McKenzie, Grau kick good	ACU 30–21
4	10:42	GSU	Lynquez Blair 27-yard touchdown reception from Arbuckle, Lutz kick good	ACU 30–28
4	6:36	ACU	Cade Stone 7-yard touchdown reception from McKenzie, Grau kick good	ASU 37–28
4	4:31	GSU	Ruiz 9-yard touchdown reception from Arbuckle, Lutz kick good	ASU 37–35
4	0:04	GSU	26-yard field goal by Lutz	GCU 38–37

=== New Mexico State ===
New Mexico State at Georgia State

Team	1	2	3	4	Total
• Aggies	0	10	7	17	34
Panthers	10	7	7	7	31

- Date: September 6
- Location: Georgia Dome
  Atlanta, Georgia
- Game start: 2:05 p.m. EST
- Elapsed time: 3:19
- Game attendance: 10,126
- Game weather: Dome
- Referee: Tony Backert
- TV announcers (ESPN3): Charlie Neal & Wayne Gandy

Scoring summary
1	11:20	GSU	Donovan Harden 68-yard touchdown reception from Nick Arbuckle, Wil Lutz kick good	GSU 7–0
1	2:01	GSU	38-yard field goal by Lutz	GSU 10–0
2	11:40	GSU	Krysten Hammon, 8-yard touchdown run, Lutz kick good	GSU 17–0
2	4:15	NMSU	41-yard field goal by Johnson	GSU 17–3
2	3:15	NMSU	Rodney Bulter 50-yard touchdown interception from Nick Arbuckle, Johnson kick good	GSU 17–10
3	14:00	GSU	45-yard touchdown run, Lutz kick good	GSU 24–10
3	9:21	NMSU	Morgan 26-yard touchdown reception from Rogers, Johnson kick good	GSU 21 –17
4	14:16	NMSU	30-yard field goal by Johnson	GSU 24–20
4	8:04	NMSU	Joseph Matthews 5-yard touchdown reception from Rogers, Johnson kick good	NMSU 24–27
4	2:30	GSU	Nick Arbuckle 1-yard touchdown run, Lutz kick good	GSU 31–27
4	0:15	NMSU	Morgan 11-yard touchdown reception from Rogers, Johnson kick good	NMSU 31–34

=== Air Force ===
Air Force at Georgia State

Team	1	2	3	4	Total
• Falcons	14	17	7	10	48
Panthers	0	10	14	14	38

- Date: September 13
- Location: Georgia Dome
  Atlanta, Georgia
- Game start: 2:05 p.m. EST
- Elapsed time: 3:16
- Game attendance: 16,836
- Game weather: Dome
- Referee: Mike Defee
- TV announcers (ESPN3): Shawn Kenney & Rocky Boiman

Scoring summary
1	12:06	AFA	Jacobi Ownes 2-yard touchdown run, Conant kick good	AFA 7–0
1	5:17	AFA	Garrett Brown 37-yard touchdown reception from Kale Pearson, Conant kick good	AFA 14–0
2	12:49	GSU	Kyler Neal 25-yard touchdown run, Lutz kick good	AFA 14–7
2	9:05	AFA	Jacobi Ownes 7-yard touchdown run, Conant kick good	GSU 21–7
2	4:21	AFA	Kale Pearson 1-yard touchdown run, Conant kick good	GSU 28–7
2	1:03	GSU	33-yard field goal by Wil Lutz	AFA 28–10
2	0:00	AFA	26-yard field goal by Will Conant	GSU 31–10
3	8:31	GSU	Lynquez Blair 15-yard touchdown reception from Nick Arbuckle, Lutz kick good	ACU 31–17
3	6:47	AFA	Kale Pearson 1-yard touchdown run, Conant kick good	AFA 38–17
3	1:50	GSU	Nick Arbuckle 1-yard touchdown run, Lutz kick good	AFA 38–24
4	12:38	AFA	Garrett Brown 37-yard touchdown reception from Kale Pearson, Conant kick good	AFA 45–24
4	10:34	GSU	Lynquez Blair 13-yard touchdown reception from Nick Arbuckle, Lutz kick good	AFA 45–31
4	5:31	AFA	41-yard field goal by Will Conant	GCU 38–37
4	4:57	GSU	Duvall Smith 2-yard touchdown run, Lutz kick good	AFA 48–38

=== Washington ===
Georgia State at Washington

Team	1	2	3	4	Total
Panthers	0	14	0	0	14
• Huskies	0	0	21	24	45

- Date: September 20
- Location: Husky Stadium
  Seattle, Washington
- Game start: 3:07 p.m. PDT
- Elapsed time: 3:13
- Game attendance: 64,608
- Game weather: Clear
- Referee: Michael Batlan
- TV announcers (P12N): JB Long, Anthony Herron, & Ashley Adamson

Scoring summary
2	13:47	GSU	Keith Rucker 2-yard touchdown reception from Nick Arbuckle, Lutz kick good	GSU 7–0
2	0:47	GSU	Robert Davis 9-yard touchdown reception from Nick Arbuckle, Lutz kick good	GSU 14–0
3	11:35	WASH	Jeff Lindquist 9-yard touchdown run, Van Winkle kick good	GSU 14–7
3	3:52	WASH	Kendyl Taylor 10-yard touchdown reception from Cyler Miles, Van Winkle kick good	14–14
3	2:25	WASH	Kasen Williams 3-yard touchdown reception from Cyler Miles, Van Winkle kick good	WASH 21–14
4	12:10	WASH	Jaydon Mickens 9-yard touchdown reception from Cyler Miles, Van Winkle kick good	WASH 28–14
4	9:03	WASH	Jeff Lindquist 14-yard touchdown run, Van Winkle kick good	WASH 35–14
4	8:31	WASH	John Timu 35-yard touchdown interception from Nick Arbuckle, Van Winkle kick good	ACU 42–14
4	4:57	WASH	25-yard field goal by C. Van Winkle	AFA 45–14
