= 2014 Arkansas State Red Wolves football team =

American college football season

2014 Arkansas State Red Wolves football

GoDaddy Bowl, L 44–63 vs. Toledo
- Conference: Sun Belt Conference
- Record: 7–6 (5–3 Sun Belt)
- Head coach: Blake Anderson (1st season)
- Co-offensive coordinators: Walt Bell (1st season); Glen Elarbee (1st season)
- Offensive scheme: Spread
- Defensive coordinator: Joe Cauthen (1st season)
- Base defense: 4–2–5
- Home stadium: Centennial Bank Stadium

2014 Sun Belt Conference football standings
	Conf.			Overall
Team	W		L	W		L
Georgia Southern * $	8	–	0	9	–	3
Louisiana–Lafayette ***	5	–	1	7	–	4
Appalachian State *	6	–	2	7	–	5
Texas State	5	–	3	7	–	5
Arkansas State	5	–	3	7	–	6
South Alabama	5	–	3	6	–	7
Louisiana–Monroe	3	–	5	4	–	8
Troy	3	–	5	3	–	9
New Mexico State	1	–	7	2	–	10
Idaho **	1	–	7	1	–	10
Georgia State	0	–	8	1	–	11
$ – Conference champion; * – Appalachian State and Georgia Southern ineligible for postseason play due to FCS-to-FBS transition rules ** – Idaho ineligible for postseason play due to APR penalties *** – Louisiana–Lafayette vacated 2 wins due to NCAA violations

The 2014 Arkansas State Red Wolves football team represented Arkansas State University in the 2014 NCAA Division I FBS football season. For the fourth consecutive season, the Red Wolves were led by a first-year head coach. Blake Anderson, who was previously offensive coordinator at North Carolina, took over after Bryan Harsin left the program to become the head coach at Boise State. The Red Wolves played their home games at Centennial Bank Stadium in Jonesboro, Arkansas. They were members of the Sun Belt Conference. They finished the season 7–6, 5–3 in Sun Belt play to finish in a three-way tie for fourth place. They were invited to the GoDaddy Bowl where they lost to Toledo.

== Schedule ==
Date	Time	Opponent	Site	TV	Result	Attendance
August 30	6:00 p.m.	No. 18 (FCS) Montana State*	Centennial Bank Stadium; Jonesboro, AR	ESPN3	W 37–10	26,143
September 6	11:00 a.m.	at Tennessee*	Neyland Stadium; Knoxville, TN	SECN	L 19–34	99,538
September 13	2:30 p.m.	at Miami (FL)*	Sun Life Stadium; Miami Gardens, FL	ESPNU	L 20–41	41,519
September 20	6:00 p.m.	Utah State*	Centennial Bank Stadium; Jonesboro, AR	ESPN3	W 21–14 ^{OT}	29,029
October 4	6:00 p.m.	Louisiana–Monroe^{†}	Centennial Bank Stadium; Jonesboro, AR	ESPN3	W 28–14	29,317
October 11	1:00 p.m.	at Georgia State	Georgia Dome; Atlanta, GA	ESPN3	W 52–10	10,196
October 21	7:00 p.m.	at Louisiana–Lafayette	Cajun Field; Lafayette, LA	ESPN2	L 40–55	21,760
November 1	4:00 p.m.	at Idaho	Kibbie Dome; Moscow, ID	ESPN3	W 44–28	11,082
November 8	2:00 p.m.	South Alabama	Centennial Bank Stadium; Jonesboro, AR	ESPN3	W 45–10	23,615
November 15	2:00 p.m.	Appalachian State	Centennial Bank Stadium; Jonesboro, AR	ESPN3	L 32–37	20,016
November 20	8:30 p.m.	at Texas State	Bobcat Stadium; San Marcos, TX	ESPNU	L 27–45	12,264
November 29	2:00 p.m.	New Mexico State	Centennial Bank Stadium; Jonesboro, AR	ESPN3	W 68–35	21,043
January 4, 2015	8:00 p.m.	vs. Toledo*	Ladd–Peebles Stadium; Mobile, AL (GoDaddy Bowl)	ESPN	L 44–63	36,811
*Non-conference game; ^{†}Homecoming; Rankings from AP Poll released prior to the game; All times are in Central time

Schedule source:

== Personnel ==
=== Roster ===
As of January 2014

2014 Arkansas State Red Wolves football team roster
Players
Coaches
Offense

Pos.	#	Name	Class
QB	10	Cameron Birse	So
OL	73	Travis Bodenstein	Jr
WR	80	William Boyd	Sr
OL	79	Jemar Clark	Fr
WR	30	Kelsey Collins	Sr
WR	20	Brandon Cox	So
RB	28	Kendrick Daniels	Fr
TE	85	Clayton Davis	Jr
TE	46	Christian Flewellen	Fr
LB	53	Ben Gallagher	So
OL	68	Bryce Giddens	Jr
RB	34	Michael Gordon	Jr
OL	58	Tyler Greve	Sr
TE	19	Darion Griswold	Jr
TE	88	Jonah Hill	So
QB	8	Stephen Hogan	Jr
OL	78	Chris Hooks	So
WR	15	Tres Houston	Jr
OL	61	Colton Jackson	Fr
RB	6	Frankie Jackson	Sr
OL	63	Skyler Jones	So
QB	9	Fredi Knighten	Jr
TE	82	Warren Leapheart	Fr
WR	81	Carl Lee Jr.	So
WR	85	Justin Lovell	Fr
WR	89	Taylor Mason	Jr
OL	75	Robert Maxwell	Fr
WR	18	Booker Mays	Fr
WR	23	J.D. McKissic	Jr
OL	74	Devin Mondie	Fr
TE	86	Jerry Moorehead	So
WR	84	Dijon Paschal	So
TE	87	Kenneth Rains	Sr
QB	12	Chandler Rogers	Sr
WR	3	Patrick Ryan	Sr
QB	14	Dezmond Stegall	So
OL	71	Steven Stevens	Jr
QB	14	Sterling Stowers	So
OL	72	Brennan Tutor	Sr
OL	78	Adam Whalen	So
RB	30	Johnston White	So
OL	69	Alan Wright	Sr
OL	62	Christian Beard	Fr
OL	60	Jhamahl Bell	Fr
RB	28	Brandon Byner	Fr
OL	70	Kyle Harris	Jr
RB	4	Terrance Hollingsworth	Fr
OL	77	Daniel Keith	Fr
WR	24	Blake Mack	Fr
RB	5	Daryl Rollins-Davis	Fr
QB	13	James Tabary	Fr
WR	16	Tyler Trosin	Jr

Defense

Pos.	#	Name	Class
DB	25	Irving Adams	So
DB	12	Geoffrey Anderson	Fr
DB	22	Brock Barnhill	Sr
DL	77	Dexter Blackmon	Sr
DB	10	Artez Brown	Sr
LB	33	Darius Buckley	Sr
LB	47	Jason Card	Sr
DB	31	Chris Clinard	Sr
DL	95	Lamarcus Cole	Fr
DB	5	Kyle Coleman	Sr
DB	38	Jeremy Fulcher	So
DB	8	Charleston Girley	Jr
DB	17	Jamaris Hart	So
DB	3	Rocky Hayes	Jr
LB	52	Quanterio Heath	Fr
DB	29	Chris Humes	Jr
DB	27	Money Hunter	So
DB	32	Ryan Jacobs	Sr
DB	13	Colin Janice	So
LB	35	Mark Johnson	So
DE	40	Ja'Von Jones	So
LB	48	Qushaun Lee	Sr
DE	99	Jabari Mathieu	Sr
DB	35	Nathaniel McVay	So
DL	76	Austin Moreton	Fr
DE	96	Chris Odom	So
DB	36	Kejuan Peque	So
DL	92	Darrius Rosser	Fr
DL	91	Hunter Shantz	Fr
DL	62	Edwin Smith	Fr
DE	42	Chris Stone	Jr
DB	24	Andrew Tryon	Sr
DB	16	TeDarius Turner	Jr
DB	43	Raziel Valgis	Jr
DB	39	Marquis Walker	So
LB	44	Trent Waters	So
LB	55	Xavier Woodson	So
LB	57	Troy Wyche	So
DB	11	Sterling Young	Sr
DT	95	Charles Alexander	Jr
CB	13	D.J. Armstead	Fr
DE	54	Caleb Caston	Fr
DE	31	Jarrod Chandler	Fr
LB	34	Carderious Dean	Jr
CB	7	Charles Gaskin	Fr
S	12	Charles Grant	Fr
DT	90	Marcus Hudson	Fr
DB	9	Khari Lain	Fr
DT	97	Chuks Ota	Fr
DT	96	E.J. Sutton	Fr
CB	1	Blaise Taylor	Fr
CB	2	Nehemiah Wagner	Fr

Special teams

Pos.	#	Name	Class
LS	45	Ryan Eustace	Fr
P/K	15	Luke Ferguson	Jr
P	43	Hunter Holmes	So
P/K	4	Paul Jones	Jr
K	36	Dallas Kepler	Fr
K	41	Logan Spry	Jr

Head coach

- Blake Anderson (1st year)

Coordinators/assistant coaches

- Walt Bell – Assistant Head Coach/Co-Offensive Coordinator/Quarterbacks
- Glen Elarbee – Co-Offensive Coordinator/Offensive Line
- Joe Cauthen – Defensive Coordinator/Linebackers
- Brian Early – Defensive Line
- Anthony Tucker – Running Backs
- Dan Dodd – Tight Ends/Recruiting Coordinator
- Luke Paschall – Wide Receivers/Special Teams Coordinator
- Allen Johnson – Safeties
- Trooper Taylor – Cornerbacks
- Matt Shadeed – Strength and Conditioning

Legend

- (C) Team captain
- (S) Suspended
- (I) Ineligible
- Injured
- Redshirt

Roster
Last update: September 2, 2014

== Game summaries ==
=== Montana State ===
Montana State @ Arkansas State

Team	1	2	3	4	Total
Bobcats	7	0	3	0	10
• Red Wolves	10	3	10	14	37

- Date: August 30
- Location: Centennial Bank Stadium
  Jonesboro, AR
- Game start: 6:00 p.m. CDT
- Game attendance: 26,143
- TV announcers (ESPN3): Brock Bowling, Wayne Gandy

Scoring summary

Quarter	Time	Drive			Team	Scoring information	Score	
Quarter	Time	Plays	Yards	TOP	Team	Scoring information	Montana State	Arkansas State
1	14:19	3	75	0:41	Arkansas State	Michael Gordon 42-yard touchdown run, Luke Ferguson kick good	0	7
1	7:17	4	7	1:32	Montana State	Anthony Knight 1-yard touchdown run, Luke Daly kick good	7	7
1	5:40	12	59	4:19	Arkansas State	29-yard field goal by Luke Ferguson	7	10
2	3:38	13	93	3:33	Arkansas State	23-yard field goal by Luke Ferguson	7	13
3	14:52	10	47	4:31	Montana State	34-yard field goal by Luke Daly	10	13
3	7:03	5	17	1:37	Arkansas State	41-yard field goal by Luke Ferguson	10	16
3	2:37	3	80	0:44	Arkansas State	Darion Griswold 23-yard touchdown reception from Fredi Knighten, Luke Ferguson kick good	10	23
4	15:00	4	54	0:48	Arkansas State	Terrance Hollingsworth 1-yard touchdown run, Luke Ferguson kick good	10	30
4	10:54	4	15	1:07	Arkansas State	Johnston White 1-yard touchdown run, Luke Ferguson kick good	10	37
"TOP" = time of possession. For other American football terms, see Glossary of American football.								

=== @ Tennessee ===
Arkansas State @ Tennessee

Team	1	2	3	4	Total
Red Wolves	6	6	0	7	19
• Volunteers	10	14	7	3	34

- Date: September 6
- Location: Neyland Stadium
  Knoxville, TN
- Game start: 11:00 a.m. CDT
- Game attendance: 99,538
- TV announcers (SEC Network): Dave Lamont, Ray Bentley, Dawn Davenport

Scoring summary

Quarter	Time	Drive			Team	Scoring information	Score	
Quarter	Time	Plays	Yards	TOP	Team	Scoring information	Arkansas State	Tennessee
1	13:16	6	40	2:13	Arkansas State	Fredi Knighten 4-yard touchdown run, Luke Ferguson kick no good	6	0
1	11:03	9	73	3:47	Tennessee	20-yard field goal by Aaron Medley	6	3
1	6:10	10	70	3:08	Tennessee	Jalen Hurd 4-yard touchdown run, Aaron Medley kick good	6	10
2	15:00	10	77	2:23	Tennessee	Marquez North 10-yard touchdown reception from Justin Worley, Aaron Medley kick good	6	17
2	8:39	13	72	4:29	Arkansas State	Tres Houston 9-yard touchdown reception from Fredi Knighten, 2-point pass incomplete	12	17
2	3:56	10	71	2:36	Tennessee	Justin Worley 5-yard touchdown run, Aaron Medley kick good	12	24
3	11:07	10	64	3:15	Tennessee	Marquez North 14-yard touchdown reception from Justin Worley, Aaron Medley kick good	12	31
4	13:42	11	83	3:36	Arkansas State	DeKeathan Williams 24-yard touchdown run, Luke Ferguson kick good	19	31
4	2:47	4	9	1:06	Tennessee	38-yard field goal by Aaron Medley	19	34
"TOP" = time of possession. For other American football terms, see Glossary of American football.								

=== @ Miami ===
Arkansas State @ Miami

Team	1	2	3	4	Total
Red Wolves	7	7	0	6	20
• Hurricanes	20	7	14	0	41

- Date: September 13
- Location: Sun Life Stadium
  Miami Gardens, FL
- Game start: 2:30 p.m. CDT
- Game attendance: 41,519
- TV announcers (ESPNU): Adam Amin, John Congemi

Scoring summary

Quarter	Time	Drive			Team	Scoring information	Score	
Quarter	Time	Plays	Yards	TOP	Team	Scoring information	Arkansas State	Miami
1	13:13	2	67	1:21	Miami	Phillip Dorsett 63-yard touchdown reception from Brad Kaaya, Michael Badgley kick good	0	7
1	11:52	11	65	2:49	Arkansas State	Fredi Knighten 1-yard touchdown run, Luke Ferguson kick good	7	7
1	9:03	3	70	0:42	Miami	Clive Walford 19-yard touchdown reception from Brad Kaaya, Michael Badgley kick good	7	14
1	5:59	6	66	2:47	Miami	Duke Johnson 33-yard touchdown run, Michael Badgley kick no good	7	20
2	4:55	7	69	3:39	Miami	Gus Edwards 27-yard touchdown run, Michael Badgley kick good	7	27
2	1:16	3	60	0:53	Arkansas State	Fredi Knighten 19-yard touchdown reception from Tres Houston, Luke Ferguson kick good	14	27
3	9:44	3	60	1:12	Miami	Phillip Dorsett 63-yard touchdown reception from Brad Kaaya, Michael Badgley kick good	14	34
3	7:07	9	65	2:56	Miami	Braxton Berrios 6-yard touchdown reception from Brad Kaaya, Michael Badgley kick good	14	41
4	15:00	16	89	5:54	Arkansas State	Johnston White 1-yard touchdown run, Luke Ferguson kick no good	20	41
"TOP" = time of possession. For other American football terms, see Glossary of American football.								

=== Utah State ===
Utah State @ Arkansas State

Team	1	2	3	4	OT	Total
Aggies	7	0	7	0	0	14
• Red Wolves	0	0	7	7	7	21

- Date: September 27
- Location: Centennial Bank Stadium
  Jonesboro, AR
- Game start: 6:00 p.m. CDT
- Game attendance: 29,029

Scoring summary

Quarter	Time	Drive			Team	Scoring information	Score	
Quarter	Time	Plays	Yards	TOP	Team	Scoring information	Utah State	Arkansas State
1	7:47	1	81	0:10	Utah State	Hunter Sharp 81-yard touchdown reception from Darell Garretson, Nick Diaz kick good	7	0
3	8:45	3	13	1:05	Arkansas State	J. D. McKissic 12-yard touchdown run, Luke Ferguson kick good	7	7
3	7:34	8	75	3:51	Utah State	Ronald Butler 41-yard touchdown reception from Darell Garretson, Nick Diaz kick good	14	7
4	7:57	10	66	2:59	Arkansas State	Johnston White 4-yard touchdown run, Luke Ferguson kick good	14	14
OT		2	25		Arkansas State	Dijon Paschal 24-yard touchdown reception from Fredi Knighten, Luke Ferguson kick good	14	21
"TOP" = time of possession. For other American football terms, see Glossary of American football.								

=== Louisiana–Monroe ===
Louisiana–Monroe @ Arkansas State

Team	1	2	3	4	Total
Warhawks	0	0	0	14	14
• Red Wolves	0	0	14	14	28

- Date: October 4
- Location: Centennial Bank Stadium
  Jonesboro, AR
- Game start: 6:00 p.m. CDT
- Game attendance: 29,317
- TV announcers (ESPN3): Brock Bowling, Wayne Gandy

Scoring summary

Quarter	Time	Drive			Team	Scoring information	Score	
Quarter	Time	Plays	Yards	TOP	Team	Scoring information	Louisiana–Monroe	Arkansas State
3	8:51	3	71	0:33	Arkansas State	Fredi Knighten 3-yard touchdown run, Luke Ferguson kick good	0	7
3	1:38	11	80	4:30	Arkansas State	Tyler Trosin 12-yard touchdown reception from Fredi Knighten, Luke Ferguson kick good	0	14
4	12:21	1	59	0:10	Louisiana–Monroe	Ajalen Holley 59-yard touchdown reception from Pete Thomas, Justin Manton kick good	7	14
4	10:08	6	75	2:13	Arkansas State	Fredi Knighten 29-yard touchdown run, Luke Ferguson kick good	7	21
4	9:13	2	22	0:25	Arkansas State	Fredi Knighten 12-yard touchdown run, Luke Ferguson kick good	7	28
4	1:30	7	97	1:11	Louisiana–Monroe	Kenzee Jackson 41-yard touchdown reception from Brayle Brown, Justin Manton kick good	14	28
"TOP" = time of possession. For other American football terms, see Glossary of American football.								

=== @ Georgia State ===
Arkansas State @ Georgia State

Team	1	2	3	4	Total
• Red Wolves	24	7	14	7	52
Panthers	0	3	0	7	10

- Date: October 11
- Location: Georgia Dome
  Atlanta, GA
- Game start: 1:00 p.m. CDT
- Game attendance: 10,196
- TV announcers (ESPN3): Matt Stewart, Wayne Gandy

Scoring summary

Quarter	Time	Drive			Team	Scoring information	Score	
Quarter	Time	Plays	Yards	TOP	Team	Scoring information	Arkansas State	Georgia State
1	8:32	9	85	3:14	Arkansas State	Darion Griswold 7-yard touchdown reception from Fredi Knighten, Luke Ferguson kick good	7	0
1	5:56	6	12	2:21	Arkansas State	26-yard field goal by Luke Ferguson	10	0
1	3:20	5	69	1:47	Arkansas State	Michael Gordon 50-yard touchdown run, Luke Ferguson kick good	17	0
1	0:00	6	68	2:14	Arkansas State	Kenneth Rains 2-yard touchdown reception from Fredi Knighten, Luke Ferguson kick good	24	0
2	2:22	9	18	4:05	Georgia State	26-yard field goal by Wil Lutz	24	3
2	0:35	6	75	1:47	Arkansas State	Johnston White 13-yard touchdown run, Luke Ferguson kick good	31	3
3	12:40	6	75	2:20	Arkansas State	Fredi Knighten 51-yard touchdown run, Luke Ferguson kick good	38	3
3	4:43	12	93	4:06	Arkansas State	Michael Gordon 11-yard touchdown run, Luke Ferguson kick good	45	3
4	9:55	7	34	2:40	Arkansas State	Warren Leapheart 2-yard touchdown reception from Fredi Knighten, Luke Ferguson kick good	52	3
4	3:49	12	67	6:06	Georgia State	Gerald Howse 2-yard touchdown run, Wil Lutz kick good	52	10
"TOP" = time of possession. For other American football terms, see Glossary of American football.								

=== @ Louisiana–Lafayette ===
Arkansas State @ Louisiana–Lafayette

Team	1	2	3	4	Total
Red Wolves	9	14	0	17	40
• Ragin' Cajuns	13	21	7	14	55

- Date: October 21
- Location: Cajun Field
  Lafayette, LA
- Game start: 7:00 p.m. CDT
- Game attendance: 21,760
- TV announcers (ESPN2): Mike Couzens, Ray Bentley, Laura Rutledge

Scoring summary

Quarter	Time	Drive			Team	Scoring information	Score	
Quarter	Time	Plays	Yards	TOP	Team	Scoring information	Arkansas State	Louisiana–Lafayette
1	11:22	4	71	1:14	Arkansas State	Fredi Knighten 60-yard touchdown run, Luke Ferguson kick no good	6	0
1	7:45	9	81	3:37	Louisiana–Lafayette	Alonzo Harris 4-yard touchdown run, Hunter Stover kick no good	6	6
1	4:58	7	59	2:47	Arkansas State	44-yard field goal by Luke Ferguson	9	6
1	1:20	9	75	3:38	Louisiana–Lafayette	Alonzo Harris 22-yard touchdown run, Hunter Stover kick good	9	13
2	14:16	1	1	0:03	Louisiana–Lafayette	Alonzo Harris 1-yard touchdown run, Hunter Stover kick good	9	20
2	11:19	4	85	2:05	Louisiana–Lafayette	Elijah McGuire 74-yard touchdown run, Hunter Stover kick good	9	27
2	8:49	4	54	1:34	Louisiana–Lafayette	Elijah McGuire 13-yard touchdown run, Hunter Stover kick good	9	34
2	7:52	3	79	0:57	Arkansas State	Michael Gordon 70-yard touchdown run, Luke Ferguson kick good	16	34
2	4:29	1	87	0:14	Arkansas State	Dijon Paschal 87-yard touchdown reception from Fredi Knighten, Luke Ferguson kick good	23	34
3	6:14	2	5	0:44	Louisiana–Lafayette	Alonzo Harris 4-yard touchdown run, Hunter Stover kick good	23	41
4	10:10	17	78	6:51	Arkansas State	29-yard field goal by Luke Ferguson	26	41
4	5:37	8	93	2:19	Arkansas State	Dijon Paschal 6-yard touchdown reception from Fredi Knighten, 2-point pass incomplete	32	41
4	3:30	4	53	2:07	Louisiana–Lafayette	Elijah McGuire 43-yard touchdown run, Hunter Stover kick good	32	48
4	1:12	7	50	2:18	Arkansas State	Tres Houston 12-yard touchdown reception from Fredi Knighten, 2-point pass good	40	48
4	0:54	3	54	0:18	Louisiana–Lafayette	Elijah McGuire 54-yard touchdown run, Hunter Stover kick good	40	55
"TOP" = time of possession. For other American football terms, see Glossary of American football.								

=== @ Idaho ===
Arkansas State @ Idaho

Team	1	2	3	4	Total
• Red Wolves	7	10	13	14	44
Vandals	0	14	14	0	28

- Date: November 1
- Location: Kibbie Dome
  Moscow, ID
- Game start: 4:00 p.m. CDT
- Game attendance: 11,082
- TV announcers (ESPN3): Trey Bender, Pat Hill

Scoring summary

Quarter	Time	Drive			Team	Scoring information	Score	
Quarter	Time	Plays	Yards	TOP	Team	Scoring information	Arkansas State	Idaho
1	10:15	2	42	0:22	Arkansas State	Michael Gordon 44-yard touchdown run, Luke Ferguson kick good	7	0
2	10:23				Arkansas State		14	0
2	7:49	7	75	2:34	Idaho	Elijhaa Penny 1-yard touchdown run, Austin Rekhow kick good	14	7
2	3:17	6	33	2:19	Idaho	Jerrel Brown 8-yard touchdown run, Austin Rekhow kick good	14	14
2	0:07	11	64	3:10	Arkansas State	28-yard field goal by Luke Ferguson	17	14
3	9:03	8	86	2:39	Idaho	Elijhaa Penny 2-yard touchdown run, Austin Rekhow kick good	17	21
3	6:34	2	46	0:26	Arkansas State	Michael Gordon 7-yard touchdown run, Luke Ferguson kick good	24	21
3	2:58	8	75	3:36	Idaho	Jerrel Brown 16-yard touchdown run, Austin Rekhow kick good	24	28
3	0:07	8	58	2:51	Arkansas State	Michael Gordon 1-yard touchdown run, Luke Ferguson kick no good	30	28
4	7:41	3	38	1:00	Arkansas State	Michael Gordon 23-yard touchdown run, Luke Ferguson kick good	37	28
4	6:35	2	8	0:30	Arkansas State	Michael Gordon 4-yard touchdown run, Luke Ferguson kick good	44	28
"TOP" = time of possession. For other American football terms, see Glossary of American football.								

=== South Alabama ===
South Alabama @ Arkansas State

Team	1	2	3	4	Total
Jaguars	3	0	0	7	10
• Red Wolves	7	17	14	7	45

- Date: November 8
- Location: Centennial Bank Stadium
  Jonesboro, AR
- Game start: 2:00 p.m. CDT
- Game attendance: 23,615
- TV announcers (ESPN3): Matt Stewart, Rocky Boiman, Danielle Percival

Scoring summary

Quarter	Time	Drive			Team	Scoring information	Score	
Quarter	Time	Plays	Yards	TOP	Team	Scoring information	South Alabama	Arkansas State
1	2:52	7	75	1:49	Arkansas State	Dijon Paschal 47-yard touchdown reception from Fredi Knighten, Luke Ferguson kick good	0	7
1	0:25	6	18	2:23	South Alabama	41-yard field goal by Aleem Sunanon	3	7
2	12:53	7	55	2:23	Arkansas State	Fredi Knighten 17-yard touchdown run, Luke Ferguson kick good	3	14
2	8:41	4	-1	1:16	Arkansas State	46-yard field goal by Luke Ferguson	3	17
2	2:36	12	61	4:56	Arkansas State	Warren Leapheart 2-yard touchdown reception from Fredi Knighten, Luke Ferguson kick good	3	24
3	11:11	7	22	2:42	Arkansas State	Michael Gordon 1-yard touchdown run, Luke Ferguson kick good	3	31
3	6:36	5	48	2:08	Arkansas State	Johnston White 5-yard touchdown run, Luke Ferguson kick good	3	38
4	14:48				Arkansas State		3	45
4	1:22	6	56	2:40	South Alabama	Berron Tyson 1-yard touchdown run, Aleem Sunanon kick good	10	45
"TOP" = time of possession. For other American football terms, see Glossary of American football.								

=== Appalachian State ===
Appalachian State @ Arkansas State

Team	1	2	3	4	Total
• Mountaineers	0	13	14	10	37
Red Wolves	13	7	0	12	32

- Date: November 15
- Location: Centennial Bank Stadium
  Jonesboro, AR
- Game start: 2:00 p.m. CDT
- Game attendance: 20,016
- TV announcers (ESPN3): Dave Weekley, Al Groh

Scoring summary

Quarter	Time	Drive			Team	Scoring information	Score	
Quarter	Time	Plays	Yards	TOP	Team	Scoring information	Appalachian State	Arkansas State
"TOP" = time of possession. For other American football terms, see Glossary of American football.								

=== @ Texas State ===
Arkansas State @ Texas State

Team	1	2	3	4	Total
Red Wolves	0	14	6	7	27
• Bobcats	7	21	3	14	45

- Date: November 22
- Location: Bobcat Stadium
  San Marcos, TX
- Game start: 8:30 p.m. CDT
- Game attendance: 12,264

Scoring summary

Quarter	Time	Drive			Team	Scoring information	Score	
Quarter	Time	Plays	Yards	TOP	Team	Scoring information	Arkansas State	Texas State
"TOP" = time of possession. For other American football terms, see Glossary of American football.								

=== New Mexico State ===
New Mexico State @ Arkansas State

Team	1	2	3	4	Total
Aggies	7	14	7	7	35
• Red Wolves	7	20	21	20	68

- Date: November 29
- Location: Centennial Bank Stadium
  Jonesboro, AR
- Game start: 2:00 p.m. CDT
- Game attendance: 21,043
- TV announcers (ESPN3): Brock Bowling, Curtis Braham

Scoring summary

Quarter	Time	Drive			Team	Scoring information	Score	
Quarter	Time	Plays	Yards	TOP	Team	Scoring information	New Mexico State	Arkansas State
"TOP" = time of possession. For other American football terms, see Glossary of American football.								

=== Toledo–GoDaddy Bowl ===
Toledo vs Arkansas State

Team	1	2	3	4	Total
• Rockets	21	14	7	21	63
Red Wolves	14	3	14	13	44

- Date: January 4
- Location: Ladd–Peebles Stadium
  Mobile, AL
- Game start: 8:00 p.m. CDT
- TV announcers (ESPN/Nevada Sports Network): Allen Bestwick, Ray Bentley, Quint Kessenich/Mike Grace, Jay Roberson, Randy Burgan

Scoring summary

Quarter	Time	Drive			Team	Scoring information	Score	
Quarter	Time	Plays	Yards	TOP	Team	Scoring information	Toledo	Arkansas State
1	14:50				TOL	Fumble recovery returned 0 yards for touchdown by Trent Voss, Jeremiah Detmer kick good	7	0
1	13:30	5	75	1:20	ARST	Booker Mays 44-yard touchdown reception from Fredi Knighten, Logan Spry kick good	7	7
1	5:04	12	88	4:35	TOL	Kareem Hunt 4-yard touchdown run, Jeremiah Detmer kick good	14	7
1	2:36	3	70	1:16	TOL	Kareem Hunt 44-yard touchdown run, Jeremiah Detmer kick good	21	7
1	1:25	3	82	1:11	ARST	Tres Houston 66-yard touchdown reception from Fredi Knighten, Logan Spry kick good	21	14
2	7:13	8	42	3:29	ARST	31-yard field goal by Logan Spry	21	17
2	2:28	13	75	4:45	TOL	Kareem Hunt 29-yard touchdown run, Jeremiah Detmer kick good	28	17
2	0:34				TOL	Fumble recovery returned 67 yards for touchdown by Allen Covington, Jeremiah Detmer kick good	35	17
3	8:15	8	69	3:21	TOL	Kareem Hunt 6-yard touchdown run, Jeremiah Detmer kick good	42	17
3	4:40	8	83	3:35	ARST	Booker Mays 55-yard touchdown reception from Fredi Knighten, Logan Spry kick good	42	24
3	2:06				ARST	Interception returned 94 yards for touchdown by Money Hunter, Logan Spry kick good	42	31
4	11:46	11	75	5:20	TOL	Kareem Hunt 1-yard touchdown run, Jeremiah Detmer kick good	49	31
4	10:08	5	49	1:38	ARST	Booker Mays 27-yard touchdown reception from Fredi Knighten, Logan Spry kick good	49	38
4	6:33	6	70	3:35	TOL	Damion Jones-Moore 10-yard touchdown run, Jeremiah Detmer kick good	56	38
4	2:17	14	75	4:16	ARST	Darion Griswold 3-yard touchdown reception from Fredi Knighten, 2-point pass no good	56	44
4	1:02	4	52	1:15	TOL	Damion Jones-Moore 29-yard touchdown run, Jeremiah Detmer kick good	63	44
"TOP" = time of possession. For other American football terms, see Glossary of American football.							63	44
