= 2014 Georgia Southern Eagles football team =

American college football season

2014 Georgia Southern Eagles football

Sun Belt champion
- Conference: Sun Belt Conference
- Record: 9–3 (8–0 Sun Belt)
- Head coach: Willie Fritz (1st season)
- Offensive coordinator: Doug Ruse (1st season)
- Offensive scheme: Option
- Defensive coordinator: Jack Curtis (4th season)
- Base defense: 4–3
- Home stadium: Paulson Stadium

2014 Sun Belt Conference football standings
	Conf.			Overall
Team	W		L	W		L
Georgia Southern * $	8	–	0	9	–	3
Louisiana–Lafayette ***	5	–	1	7	–	4
Appalachian State *	6	–	2	7	–	5
Texas State	5	–	3	7	–	5
Arkansas State	5	–	3	7	–	6
South Alabama	5	–	3	6	–	7
Louisiana–Monroe	3	–	5	4	–	8
Troy	3	–	5	3	–	9
New Mexico State	1	–	7	2	–	10
Idaho **	1	–	7	1	–	10
Georgia State	0	–	8	1	–	11
$ – Conference champion; * – Appalachian State and Georgia Southern ineligible for postseason play due to FCS-to-FBS transition rules ** – Idaho ineligible for postseason play due to APR penalties *** – Louisiana–Lafayette vacated 2 wins due to NCAA violations

The 2014 Georgia Southern Eagles football team represented Georgia Southern University in the 2014 NCAA Division I FBS football season. They were led by first-year head coach Willie Fritz and played their home games at Paulson Stadium. They were first year members of the Sun Belt Conference. In their second year of the FCS to FBS transition, the Eagles were eligible for the conference championship; however, they were not bowl-eligible.

The Eagles finished their inaugural FBS season 9–3 and were undefeated in Sun Belt Conference play at 8–0, clinching the conference championship outright. Additionally, with their victory over Georgia State, the Eagles posted their 300th win in the modern era of Georgia Southern football. The Eagles became only the third team ever to win a conference title in its first FBS season, after Nevada in 1992 (Big West Conference) and Marshall in 1997 (Mid-American Conference). They were also the first team ever to go unbeaten in conference play in their first FBS season. Georgia Southern athletic director Tom Kleinlein filed for a postseason waiver to allow the Eagles to play in a bowl game; however, the NCAA denied Georgia Southern's waiver request and a subsequent appeal due to a sufficient number of "full FBS members" becoming bowl-eligible during the season.

On July 22, 2016, the university announced that it was ordered by the NCAA to vacate two wins from the 2013 season and one win from the 2014 season, due to academically ineligible student-athletes participating in those games. The win affected in the 2014 season was against the Louisiana-Monroe Warhawks; despite vacating this win, the ruling does not affect Georgia Southern's status as the 2014 Sun Belt Conference Football champions.

== Schedule ==
Date	Time	Opponent	Site	TV	Result	Attendance
August 30	12:30 pm	at NC State*	Carter–Finley Stadium; Raleigh, NC	ACCN	L 23–24	54,273
September 6	6:00 pm	Savannah State*	Paulson Stadium; Statesboro, GA	ESPN3	W 83–9	23,121
September 13	12:00 pm	at Georgia Tech*	Bobby Dodd Stadium; Atlanta, GA	ACCRSN	L 38–42	53,173
September 20	6:30 pm	at South Alabama	Ladd–Peebles Stadium; Mobile, AL	ESPN3	W 28–6	11,348
September 25	7:30 pm	Appalachian State	Paulson Stadium; Statesboro, GA (rivalry)	ESPNU	W 34–14	24,535
October 4	8:00 pm	at New Mexico State	Aggie Memorial Stadium; Las Cruces, NM	SS	W 36–28	10,256
October 11	6:00 pm	Idaho^{†}	Paulson Stadium; Statesboro, GA	SBN	W 47–24	23,250
October 25	2:00 pm	at Georgia State	Georgia Dome; Atlanta, GA (rivalry)	ESPN3	W 69–31	28,427
October 30	7:30 pm	Troy	Paulson Stadium; Statesboro, GA	ESPNU	W 42–10	18,321
November 8	4:00 pm	at Texas State	Bobcat Stadium; San Marcos, TX	ESPN3	W 28–25	16,772
November 15	3:30 pm	at Navy*	Navy–Marine Corps Memorial Stadium; Annapolis, MD	CBSSN	L 19–52	33,894
November 29	6:00 pm	Louisiana–Monroe	Paulson Stadium; Statesboro, GA	ESPN3	W 22–16	16,283
*Non-conference game; ^{†}Homecoming; All times are in Eastern time

== Game summaries ==
=== At NC State ===
Georgia Southern Eagles at NC State Wolfpack – Game summary

Quarter	1	2	3	4	Total
Eagles	7	10	3	3	23
Wolfpack	3	0	7	14	24

at Carter–Finley Stadium, Raleigh, North Carolina

- Date: August 30
- Game time: 12:30 p.m. EDT
- Game weather: Partly cloudy, 83 °F (28 °C)
- Game attendance: 54,273
- Referee: Ron Cherry
- TV: ACCN
- Box score, Recap

Game information
First quarter
- GASO – Matt Breida 61-yard run (Alex Hanks kick), 9:07. Eagles 7–0. Drive: 6 plays, 82 yards, 2:08.
- NCST – Niklas Sade 41-yard field goal, 4:52. Eagles 7–3. Drive: 11 plays, 51 yards, 4:15.

Second quarter

- GASO – Alex Hanks 32-yard field goal, 8:35. Eagles 10–3. Drive: 4 plays, 0 yards, 1:57.
- GASO – Kentrellis Showers 29-yard pass from Kevin Ellison (Alex Hanks kick), 0:34. Eagles 17–3. Drive: 11 plays, 65 yards, 5:11.

Third quarter

- NCST – Bra'Lon Cherry 6-yard pass from Jacoby Brissett (Niklas Sade kick), 8:02. Eagles 17–10. Drive: 5 plays, 80 yards, 1:36.
- GASO – Alex Hanks 19-yard field goal, 3:23. Eagles 20–10. Drive: 10 plays, 77 yards, 4:32.

Fourth quarter

- NCST – Bra'Lon Cherry 11-yard pass from Jacoby Brissett (Niklas Sade kick), 6:55. Eagles 20–17. Drive: 12 plays, 99 yards, 4:08.
- GASO – Alex Hanks 31-yard field goal, 3:35. Eagles 23–17. Drive: 6 plays, 61 yards, 3:20.
- NCST – Matt Dayes 35-yard pass from Jacoby Brissett (Niklas Sade kick), 1:37. Wolfpack 24–23. Drive: 9 plays, 75 yards, 1:58.

Statistics	GASO	NCST
First downs	18	26
Total yards	438	464
Rushing yards	246	173
Passing yards	192	291
Turnovers	1	1
Time of possession	32:27	27:33

Team	Category	Player	Statistics
Georgia Southern	Passing	Kevin Ellison	9/16, 184 yards, TD
Georgia Southern	Rushing	Kevin Ellison	20 rushes, 116 yards
Georgia Southern	Receiving	Zach Walker	5 receptions, 84 yards
NC State	Passing	Jacoby Brissett	28/40, 291 yards, 3 TD, INT
NC State	Rushing	Shadrach Thornton	10 rushes, 73 yards
NC State	Receiving	Bo Hines	9 receptions, 85 yards

=== Savannah State ===
Savannah State Tigers at Georgia Southern Eagles – Game summary

Quarter	1	2	3	4	Total
Tigers	0	0	0	9	9
Eagles	21	27	21	14	83

at Paulson Stadium, Statesboro, Georgia

- Date: September 6
- Game time: 6:00 p.m. EDT
- Game weather: Scattered clouds, 79 °F (26 °C)
- Game attendance: 23,121
- Referee: Perry Havener
- TV: ESPN3
- Box score, Recap

Game information
First quarter
- GASO – Matt Breida 14-yard run (Alex Hanks kick), 10:00. Eagles 7–0. Drive: 7 plays, 66 yards, 2:50.
- GASO – Kentrellis Showers 38-yard pass from Kevin Ellison (Alex Hanks kick), 6:52. Eagles 14–0. Drive: 1 play, 38 yards, 0:06.
- GASO – Favian Upshaw 6-yard run (Alex Hanks kick), 2:34. Eagles 21–0. Drive: 9 plays, 50 yards, 3:41.

Second quarter

- GASO – Kentrellis Showers 43-yard pass from Kevin Ellison (Alex Hanks kick), 14:35. Eagles 28–0. Drive: 4 plays, 58 yards, 1:47.
- GASO – Matt Breida 1-yard run (kick failed), 13:41. Eagles 34–0. Drive: 3 plays, 29 yards, 0:44.
- GASO – Montay Crockett 8-yard run (Alex Hanks kick), 10:02. Eagles 41–0. Drive: 3 plays, 41 yards, 1:08.
- GASO – Devin Scott 1-yard run (Alex Hanks kick), 3:09. Eagles 48–0. Drive: 9 plays, 67 yards, 4:37.

Third quarter

- GASO – Ean Days 3-yard run (Younghoe Koo kick), 12:27. Eagles 55–0. Drive: 6 plays, 65 yards, 2:33.
- GASO – Ean Days 80-yard run (Younghoe Koo kick), 6:55. Eagles 62–0. Drive: 1 play, 80 yards, 0:15.
- GASO – Brandan Thomas 29-yard run (Younghoe Koo kick), 3:46. Eagles 69–0. Drive: 4 plays, 57 yards, 2:13.

Fourth quarter

- GASO – Ezayi Youyoute 37-yard run (Younghoe Koo kick), 14:50. Eagles 76–0. Drive: 3 plays, 44 yards, 1:35.
- SAV – John Barron 39-yard field goal, 9:07. Eagles 76–3. Drive: 12 plays, 53 yards, 5:43.
- GASO – Dennis Pritchard 5-yard run (Younghoe Koo kick), 5:19. Eagles 83–3. Drive: 7 plays, 75 yards, 3:48.
- SAV – Cantrell Frazier 31-yard pass from Tino Smith II (kick blocked), 0:29. Eagles 83–9. Drive: 13 plays, 79 yards, 4:42.

Statistics	SAV	GASO
First downs	18	27
Total yards	295	684
Rushing yards	87	564
Passing yards	208	120
Turnovers	3	0
Time of possession	34:05	25:55

Team	Category	Player	Statistics
Savannah State	Passing	Tino Smith II	12/20, 110 yards, TD
Savannah State	Rushing	Tino Smith II	10 rushes, 27 yards
Savannah State	Receiving	Cantrell Frazier	3 receptions, 50 yards, TD
Georgia Southern	Passing	Kevin Ellison	2/2, 67 yards, TD
Georgia Southern	Rushing	Brandan Thomas	7 rushes, 117 yards, TD
Georgia Southern	Receiving	Kentrellis Showers	3 receptions, 91 yards, 2 TD
