= 2014 Troy Trojans football team =

American college football season

2014 Troy Trojans football
- Conference: Sun Belt Conference
- Record: 3–9 (3–5 Sun Belt)
- Head coach: Larry Blakeney (24th season)
- Offensive coordinator: Kenny Edenfield (5th season)
- Offensive scheme: Spread
- Defensive coordinator: Wayne Bolt (8th season)
- Base defense: 4–3
- Home stadium: Veterans Memorial Stadium

2014 Sun Belt Conference football standings
	Conf.			Overall
Team	W		L	W		L
Georgia Southern * $	8	–	0	9	–	3
Louisiana–Lafayette ***	5	–	1	7	–	4
Appalachian State *	6	–	2	7	–	5
Texas State	5	–	3	7	–	5
Arkansas State	5	–	3	7	–	6
South Alabama	5	–	3	6	–	7
Louisiana–Monroe	3	–	5	4	–	8
Troy	3	–	5	3	–	9
New Mexico State	1	–	7	2	–	10
Idaho **	1	–	7	1	–	10
Georgia State	0	–	8	1	–	11
$ – Conference champion; * – Appalachian State and Georgia Southern ineligible for postseason play due to FCS-to-FBS transition rules ** – Idaho ineligible for postseason play due to APR penalties *** – Louisiana–Lafayette vacated 2 wins due to NCAA violations

The 2014 Troy Trojans football team represented Troy University during the 2014 NCAA Division I FBS football season. They were led by 24th-year head coach Larry Blakeney and played their home games at Veterans Memorial Stadium as a member of the Sun Belt Conference. They finished the season 3–9 overall and 3–5 in Sun Belt play to finish in a tie for seventh place.

On October 5, Blakeney announced that he would retire at the end of the 2014 season. He finish his career with a 24-year record of 178–112–1.

== Schedule ==
Date	Time	Opponent	Site	TV	Result	Attendance
August 30	11:00 am	at UAB*	Legion Field; Birmingham, AL	FCS	L 10–48	27,133
September 6	6:00 pm	Duke*	Veterans Memorial Stadium; Troy, AL	ESPN3	L 17–34	21,331
September 13	6:00 pm	Abilene Christian*	Veterans Memorial Stadium; Troy, AL	ESPN3	L 35–38	17,320
September 20	11:00 am	at No. 13 Georgia*	Sanford Stadium; Athens, GA	SECN	L 0–66	92,746
September 27	6:00 pm	at Louisiana–Monroe	Malone Stadium; Monroe, LA	Sun Belt Network	L 20–22	18,544
October 11	2:00 pm	New Mexico State^{†}	Veterans Memorial Stadium; Troy, AL	ESPN3	W 41–24	17,628
October 18	2:00 pm	Appalachian State	Veterans Memorial Stadium; Troy, AL	ESPN3	L 14–53	15,664
October 24	6:30 pm	at South Alabama	Ladd–Peebles Stadium; Mobile, AL (rivalry)	ESPNU	L 13–27	17,146
October 30	6:30 pm	at Georgia Southern	Paulson Stadium; Statesboro, GA	ESPNU	L 10–42	18,321
November 8	2:00 pm	Georgia State	Veterans Memorial Stadium; Troy, AL	ESPN3	W 45–21	16,148
November 15	4:00 pm	at Idaho	Kibbie Dome; Moscow, ID	ESPN3	W 34–17	8,535
November 29	11:30 am	Louisiana–Lafayette	Veterans Memorial Stadium; Troy, AL	ESPN3	L 23–42	12,241
*Non-conference game; ^{†}Homecoming; Rankings from AP Poll released prior to the game; All times are in Central time
