= 2014 Idaho Vandals football team =

American college football season

2014 Idaho Vandals football
- Conference: Sun Belt Conference
- Record: 1–10 (1–7 Sun Belt)
- Head coach: Paul Petrino (2nd season)
- Offensive coordinator: Kris Cinkovich (2nd season)
- Offensive scheme: Multiple
- Defensive coordinator: Ronnie Lee (2nd season)
- Base defense: 4–3
- Home stadium: Kibbie Dome

2014 Sun Belt Conference football standings
	Conf.			Overall
Team	W		L	W		L
Georgia Southern * $	8	–	0	9	–	3
Louisiana–Lafayette ***	5	–	1	7	–	4
Appalachian State *	6	–	2	7	–	5
Texas State	5	–	3	7	–	5
Arkansas State	5	–	3	7	–	6
South Alabama	5	–	3	6	–	7
Louisiana–Monroe	3	–	5	4	–	8
Troy	3	–	5	3	–	9
New Mexico State	1	–	7	2	–	10
Idaho **	1	–	7	1	–	10
Georgia State	0	–	8	1	–	11
$ – Conference champion; * – Appalachian State and Georgia Southern ineligible for postseason play due to FCS-to-FBS transition rules ** – Idaho ineligible for postseason play due to APR penalties *** – Louisiana–Lafayette vacated 2 wins due to NCAA violations

The 2014 Idaho Vandals football team represented the University of Idaho in the 2014 NCAA Division I FBS football season. The Vandals are led by second year head coach Paul Petrino and play their home games on campus in Moscow at the Kibbie Dome. They finished the season 1–10, 1–7 in conference play to finish in a tie for ninth place.

Idaho returned to the Sun Belt Conference as a "football only" member in 2014; they previously competed in the conference in the same capacity from 2001 through 2004. Idaho was an independent for football in 2013. The team was ineligible for postseason play regardless of their final record due to an insufficient Academic Progress Rate.

== Schedule ==
Date	Time	Opponent	Site	TV	Result	Attendance
August 30	7:00 p.m.	Florida*	Ben Hill Griffin Stadium; Gainesville, FL	ESPNU	canceled^{[a]}	
September 6	4:00 p.m.	at Louisiana–Monroe	Malone Stadium; Monroe, LA	ESPN3	L 31–38	16,694
September 13	2:00 p.m.	Western Michigan*	Kibbie Dome; Moscow, ID	ESPN3	L 33–45	14,721
September 20	5:00 p.m.	at Ohio*	Peden Stadium; Athens, OH	ESPN3	L 24–36	25,211
September 27	3:00 p.m.	South Alabama	Kibbie Dome; Moscow, ID	ALT	L 10–34	14,887
October 4	5:00 p.m.	at Texas State	Bobcat Stadium; San Marcos, TX	ESPN3	L 30–35	21,345
October 11	3:00 p.m.	at Georgia Southern	Paulson Stadium; Statesboro, GA	ALT	L 24–47	23,250
October 18	2:00 p.m.	New Mexico State^{†}	Kibbie Dome; Moscow, ID	ALT	W 29–17	15,207
November 1	2:00 p.m.	Arkansas State	Kibbie Dome; Moscow, ID	ALT	L 28–44	11,082
November 8	3:30 p.m.	at San Diego State*	Qualcomm Stadium; San Diego, CA	RTRM	L 21–35	46,293
November 15	2:00 p.m.	Troy	Kibbie Dome; Moscow, ID	ALT	L 17–34	8,535
November 29	11:00 am	at Appalachian State	Kidd Brewer Stadium; Boone, NC	ESPN3	L 28–45	19,721
*Non-conference game; ^{†}Homecoming; All times are in Pacific time

Schedule source:

^{^[a]}The game did not kickoff until 9:50 p.m. due to inclement weather. The game was again delayed due to lightning after 10 seconds of play during which Florida returned the Idaho kickoff to the Idaho 14-yard line. The game was called as "suspended" 40 minutes after the second delay due to unsafe field conditions. Both schools' athletic directors decided on September 3 not to reschedule the game, thus declaring it a "no contest". Florida did agree to pay Idaho its promised fee of $975,000 and the schools agreed to schedule a game for the 2018 season.

== NFL draft ==
No Vandals were selected in the 2015 NFL draft, but offensive tackle Jesse Davis was signed as an undrafted free agent by the Seattle Seahawks.
