= Fredi Knighten =

American football coach (born 1994)

Personal information
- Born: May 14, 1994 (age 32)

Career information
- High school: Pulaski Academy
- College: Arkansas State

Career history
- Maryland (2016–2017) Graduate assistant; Florida State (2018) Graduate assistant; UMass (2019) Running backs coach; UMass (2020) Running backs coach / Quarterbacks coach; Utah State (2021) Offensive analyst; Cincinnati Bengals (2022–2023) Offensive assistant; Cincinnati Bengals (2024–2025) Assistant quarterbacks coach

Fredi Knighten is an American football coach who most recently was the assistant quarterbacks coach for the Cincinnati Bengals of the National Football League (NFL).

== Playing career ==
Knighten attended Pulaski Academy in Little Rock, Arkansas, where he helped lead his school to a state title in 2011. During his career, he passed for 8,842 yards and 119 touchdowns and ran for 1,749 yards and 24 touchdowns, while amounting a 26-1 record. Knighten also won the Landers Award which is given to Arkansas's top high school football player. Coming out of high school, he committed to play college football for the Arkansas State Red Wolves.

In his first season with the Red Wolves, Knighten completed three of five pass attempts for 44 yards and a touchdown with an interception, adding 96 rushing yards. In 2014, Knighten was named first-team all-Sun Belt. Knighten finished his career with the Red Wolves appearing in 41 games where he completed 442 of his 776 pass attempts for 5,371 yards, and 46 touchdowns to 18 interceptions. Knighten also added 1,620 yards and 21 touchdowns on 421 carries, while also hauling in three receptions for 73 yards and a touchdown.

== Coaching career ==
Knighten got his first coaching job in 2016 as a graduate assistant with the Maryland Terrapins, and joined the Florida State Seminoles in 2018 in the same role. In 2019, Knighten was hired by the UMass Minutemen as running backs coach and in 2020, he also coached the quarterbacks. In 2021, he was hired by the Utah State Aggies as an offensive analyst. Before the 2022 season, Knighten got his first NFL coaching job, where he was hired as an offensive assistant by the Cincinnati Bengals. Ahead of the 2024 season, he was promoted by the Bengals to serve as the team's assistant quarterback coach.
