= Tyler Rogers (gridiron football) =

American-born Canadian football quarterback

Profile
- Position: Quarterback

Personal information
- Born: 1992 or 1993 (age 33–34)
- Listed height: 6 ft 3 in (1.91 m)
- Listed weight: 218 lb (99 kg)

Career information
- High school: Peoria (AZ) Liberty
- College: New Mexico State
- NFL draft: 2018: undrafted

Career history
- 2018: Calgary Stampeders*
- * Offseason or practice squad member only

Awards and highlights
- Honorable Mention All-Sun Belt (2016)
- Stats at CFL.ca

Tyler Rogers is an American former gridiron football quarterback. He played college football at the New Mexico State University from 2014 to 2017.

== Early life ==
Rogers was born in approximately 1995, the son of Douglas and Pamela Rogers. He attended Liberty High School in Peoria, Arizona. He passed for 5,903 yards and 76 touchdowns in his high school career. He began his college football career playing for Arizona Western College in Yuma, Arizona, in 2013; he passed for 1,832 yards and 14 touchdowns in one season at Arizona Western.

== New Mexico State ==
Rogers joined the New Mexico State football team in 2014 as a junior college transfer. He passed for 2,779 yards and 19 touchdowns in 2014, missed most of the 2015 season after suffering a broken thumb against the New Mexico Lobos on October 3, and passed for 2,603 yards and 16 touchdowns as a redshirt junior in 2016. He was granted a medical hardship waiver which granted him one additional year of eligibility.

As a redshirt senior in 2017, Rogers passed for 4,016 yards, which ranked eighth among all NCAA Division I Football Bowl Subdivision (FBS) players. He concluded his collegiate career as one of the top offensive players in program history, ranking second (behind Chase Holbrook) with 10,372 passing yards, 10,965 yards of total offense, 83 combined passing and rushing touchdowns, and 69 passing touchdowns.

=== Statistics ===
Legend
*	Led the FBS
**Bold**	Career high

Year	GP	Passing								Rushing			
Year	GP	Cmp	Att	Pct	Yds	Y/A	TD	Int	Rtg	Att	Yds	Avg	TD
2014	**12**	268	436	**61.5**	2,779	6.4	19	**23***	118.8	69	200	**2.9**	2
2015	4	72	135	53.3	974	**7.2**	7	3	126.6	29	66	2.3	1
2016	11	224	404	55.4	2,603	6.4	16	12	116.7	**124**	**333**	2.7	4
2017	**12**	**348**	**566***	**61.5**	**4,016**	7.1	**27**	18*	**130.5**	76	20	0.3	**7**
Career	39	912	1,541	59.2	10,372	6.7	69	56	123.2	298	619	2.1	14

== Professional career ==
On May 18, 2018, Rogers signed with the Calgary Stampeders.
