= Centennial Bank Stadium =

Football stadium in Jonesboro, Arkansas

- "The Vault"
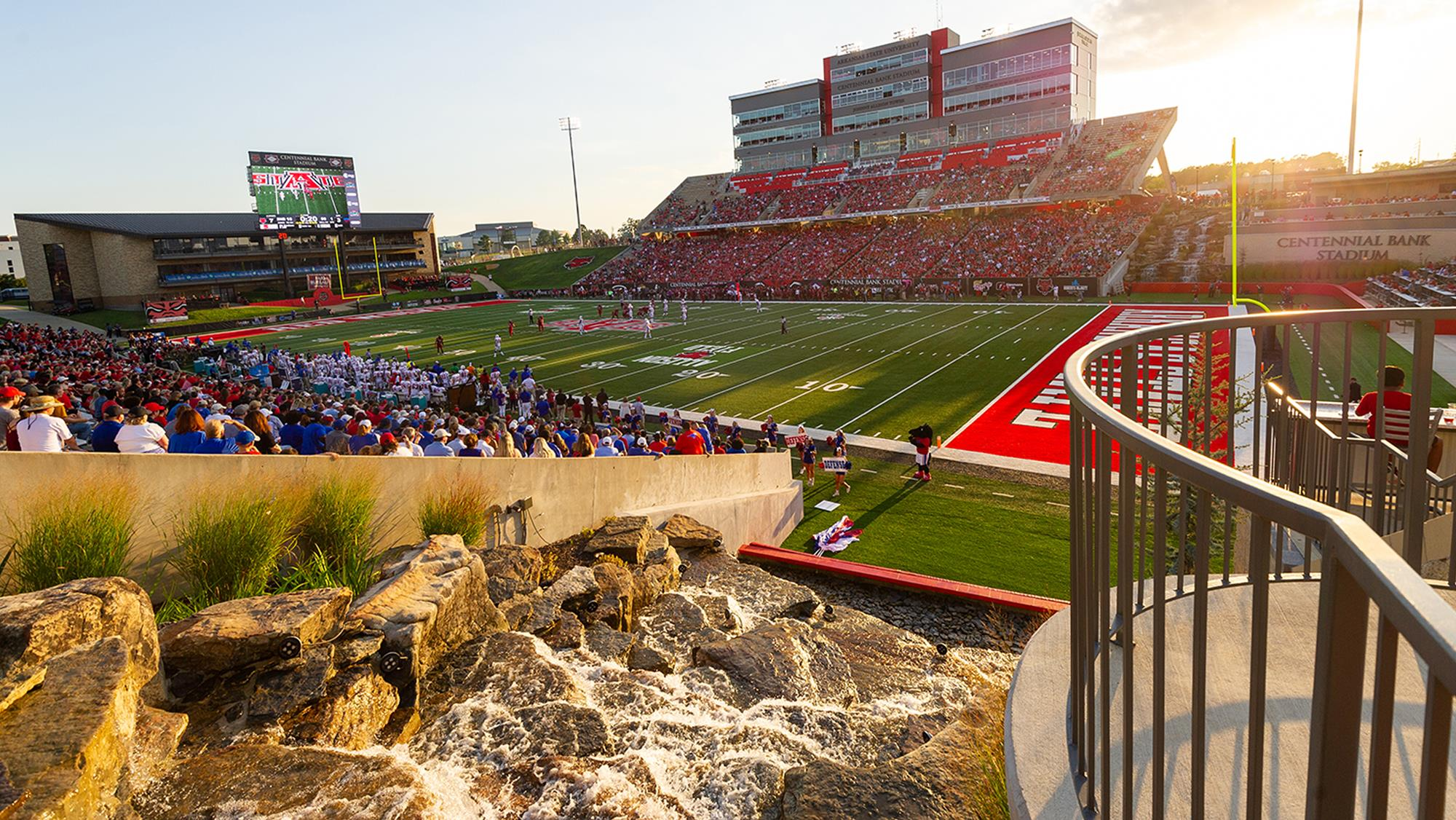

- Location in Arkansas Location in the United States
- Former names: Liberty Bank Stadium (2012–2013); ASU Stadium (2007–2011); Indian Stadium (1974–2007)
- Location: 2180 Aggie Road; Jonesboro, Arkansas 72401
- Coordinates: 35°50′56″N 90°40′2″W
- Owner: Arkansas State University
- Operator: Arkansas State University
- Capacity: 16,343 (1974–1979); 18,709 (1980–1990); 30,708 (1991–2001); 30,964 (2002–2014); 30,406 (2015–present)
- Surface: ProGreen
- Record attendance: 31,243 (December 1, 2012) vs Middle Tennessee

Construction
- Opened: September 28, 1974
- Cost: $2.5 million ($16.3 million in 2025 dollars)
- Architect: Brackett-Krennerich

Tenant
- Arkansas State Red Wolves (NCAA) 1974–present

Centennial Bank Stadium is a football stadium located in Jonesboro, Arkansas, on the campus of Arkansas State University that is home to the Arkansas State Red Wolves football team. The stadium opened in 1974 as Indian Stadium named after the old nickname of the school, the Indians, until the 2007 season when it was renamed ASU Stadium. The venue was renamed Liberty Bank Stadium in September 2012 after Liberty Bank of Arkansas donated approximately $5 million to the university. In 2013, Liberty Bank was bought by Home BancShares, whose trade name is Centennial Bank. Since 2015, the stadium has a seating capacity of 30,406.

== History ==
The stadium opened in 1974 however construction was not completely finished until prior to the 1975 season. Not all bleachers had been installed by the start of the 1974 season and lights were not installed until after the season. Despite not being fully completed, the Arkansas State football team began play there in 1974. The original cost of the stadium was $2.5 million of which $1.4 million was raised by friends and alumni of the university. The first game played in the stadium was on September 28, 1974, against Louisiana Tech University and Arkansas State lost 21–7. The first victory in the stadium was a 14–7 win over Eastern Michigan University on October 5, 1974. A dedication game was played on November 2, 1974, against Northeast Louisiana University and Arkansas State won the game 17–14.

The stadium originally had a capacity of 16,343 when it first opened. This was upgraded in 1980 to a capacity of 18,709. Further expansion was completed in 1991, when Arkansas State moved up from Division I-AA (FCS) to Division I-A (FBS) and new capacity requirements had to be met to keep up with this status, making the capacity 30,708. The grandstand was double-decked with seats and Indian Stadium had a four level press area that includes the press box and two donor levels: Happy Hunting Grounds and Chiefs Council. The area also includes a photo deck complete with an area for filming, Visiting Team AD Suite and coaches booths for both teams. In 2001, a video/scoreboard was erected in the South end zone which cost more than a million dollars to purchase and construct.

In 2013, Liberty Bank was bought by Centennial Bank, and the naming rights were also absorbed. Liberty Bank Stadium was renamed Centennial Bank Stadium for the 2014 football season.

=== Renovations ===
In 2002, more improvements were added to the stadium. Luxury suites were added, increasing capacity to its current figure of 30,964. The players and coaches of the school moved into a brand new complex that included office space for coaches, dressing rooms, meeting rooms, and player lounges. When these areas are not being used by staff and players they are used for several different purposes. These areas become suites used during football games, academic study areas for players and students, conference rooms, alumni functions, booster meetings, and recruitment purposes. The complex now houses a place known as the Performance Enhancement Center. Inside this center there are several different areas that include the Athletic Training Center, Strength and Conditioning Center, Student-Athletic Academic Success Center, a computer lab, and other various offices and rooms. In 2005, it was announced that Arkansas State University would replace the natural Bermuda grass field with FieldTurf at a cost of $500,000. However, Pro Green synthetic grass was installed in the stadium prior to the start of the 2006 season.

Thanks to a $5 million gift – the largest individual donation in A-State Athletics history – by alumnus Johnny Allison, a “Centennial Expansion” construction and renovation project to the stadium's press box and west-side concourse took place during the nine-month period between the 2014 and 2015 seasons.

The entire project, including the press box and concourse, covered 40,000 square feet (3,700 m^{2}). The Centennial Expansion project included a complete overhaul to the stadium press box, expanding it from 7,120 to 36,000 square feet (661 to 3,345 m^{2}). The project also included improvements and additions to the concourse bathrooms, concessions, gating and ticketing areas.

In 2013, Arkansas State University announced plans to build a $27 million Football Operations Center with an indoor practice field, weight rooms, lockers, medical centers, and staff offices. The plans originally called for the north end zone seating to be removed, but with average attendance being higher than ever, new seating with concession stands and TV screens are to be added.

In 2014, a Daktronics LED video display/scoreboard measuring approximately 32 feet (9.8 m) high by 50 feet (15 m) wide was erected in the south end zone. This replaces the scoreboard erected in 2001.

== Features ==
Centennial Bank Stadium features a multi-level press box, which houses media areas, coaching booths, broadcasting locations, a video control booth, camera areas, suites, a club area and more. The face of the stadium has been redesigned to include 42 loge boxes, 20 suites, a club area covering close to 8,000 square feet (740 m^{2}) and 344 club seats in its revenue-generating areas. Not only has depth been added to the press box, it now spans from approximately the 15-to-15 yard lines, allowing for enhanced media, coaching, broadcasting, control booth, visiting athletics director suite, and camera areas.

== Other uses ==
The stadium was also used for a very brief period to showcase a game between the two largest high schools in the Jonesboro-area. The game pitted Jonesboro High School against cross-town rival Nettleton High School. The game was suspended temporarily after Jonesboro won the first two games in blowouts. The average stadium attendance for these games were over 7,000. The rivalry was renewed for the 2006 high school football season and the two schools again played the game in Indian Stadium. Jonesboro won the 2006 game, but it was closer than the previous games; the final score was 44–38. In 2010 a new rivalry started with the Greene County Tech Golden Eagles. This rivalry was known as the "Border Bowl" as the counties in which the schools are located (Craighead and Greene) border each other. The series was discontinued as Jonesboro swept the series 4–0. In 2014, a new rivalry was formed with cross-town rival Valley View High School.

== Attendance records ==
The largest crowd to see an Arkansas State football game in Centennial Bank Stadium was 31,243 on December 1, 2012, when the Red Wolves hosted Middle Tennessee State University. The highest average attendance in the stadium's history was during the 2012 season when Arkansas State drew an average of 26,398 spectators per game.

Rank	Date	Attendance	Opponent	Result
1	December 1, 2012	31,243	Middle Tennessee	W, 45–0
2	August 31, 2013	30,451	Arkansas–Pine Bluff	W, 62–11
3	September 18, 2004	30,427	Memphis	L, 35–47
4	November 8, 2012	30,243	Louisiana–Monroe	W, 45–23
5	September 10, 2011	29,872	Memphis	W, 47–3

== Gallery ==
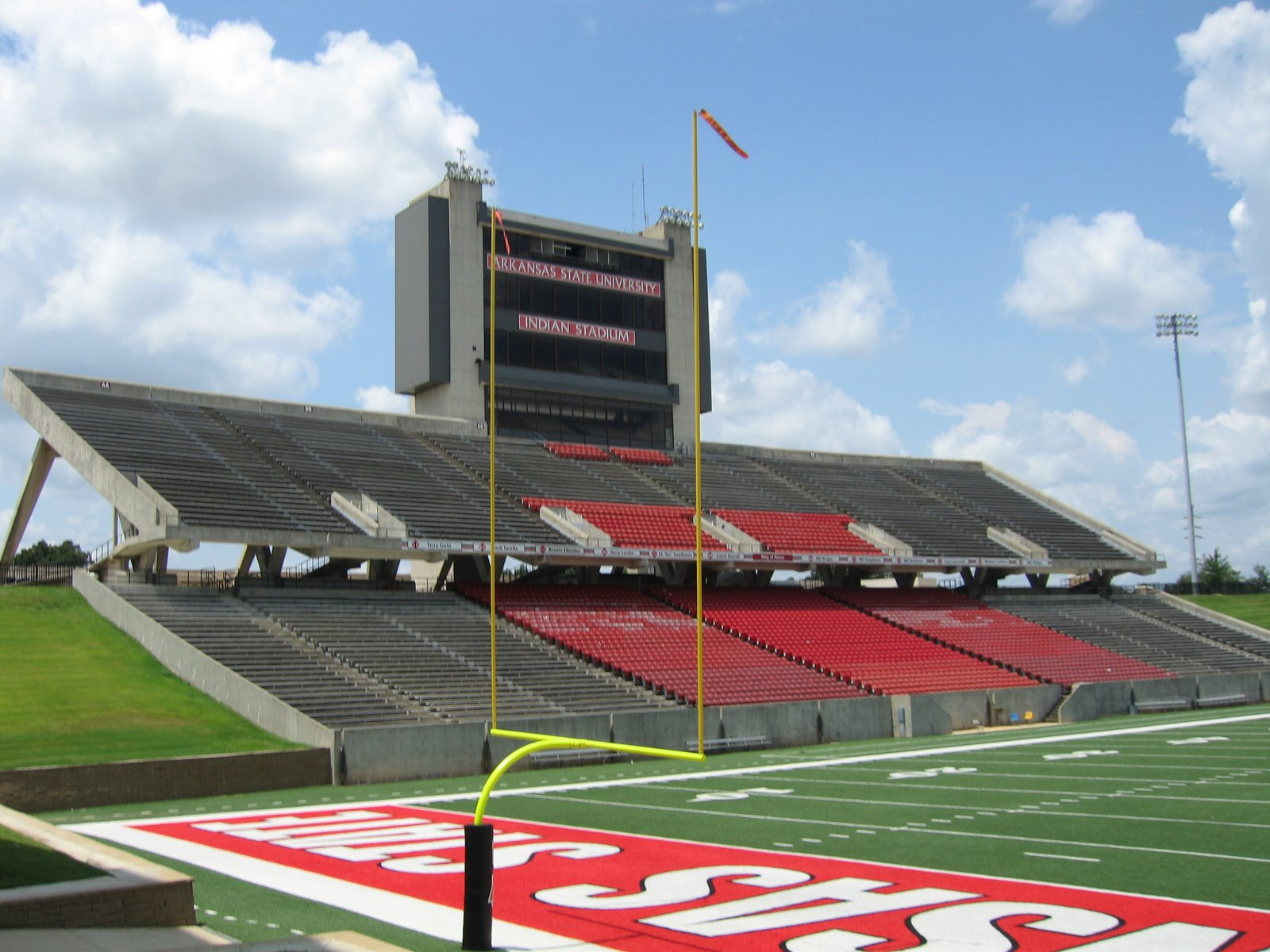
View of the Grandstand from the Southeast.

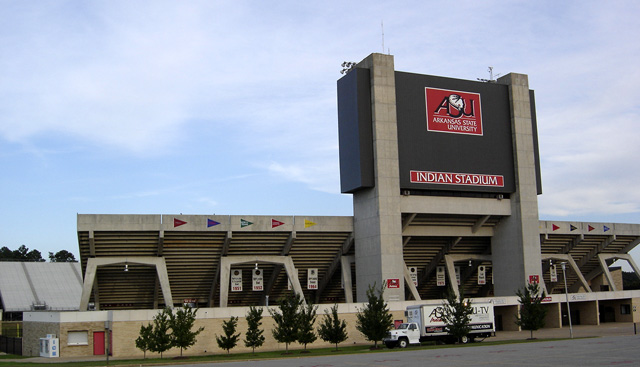
Centennial Bank Stadium seen from the west side.

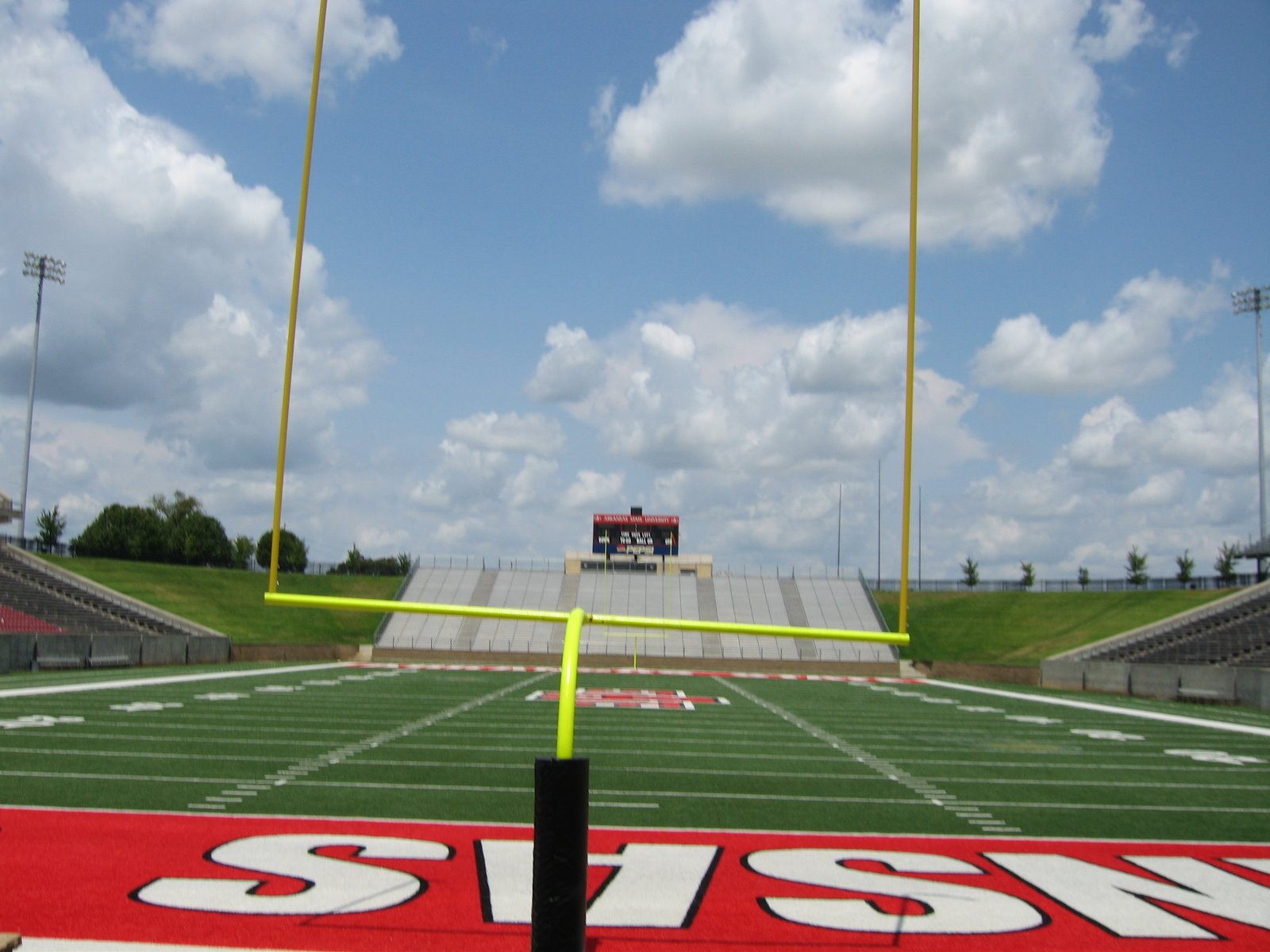
Scoreboard and end-zone seating.

== See also ==
- List of NCAA Division I FBS football stadiums
