= Louisiana Ragin' Cajuns football statistical leaders =

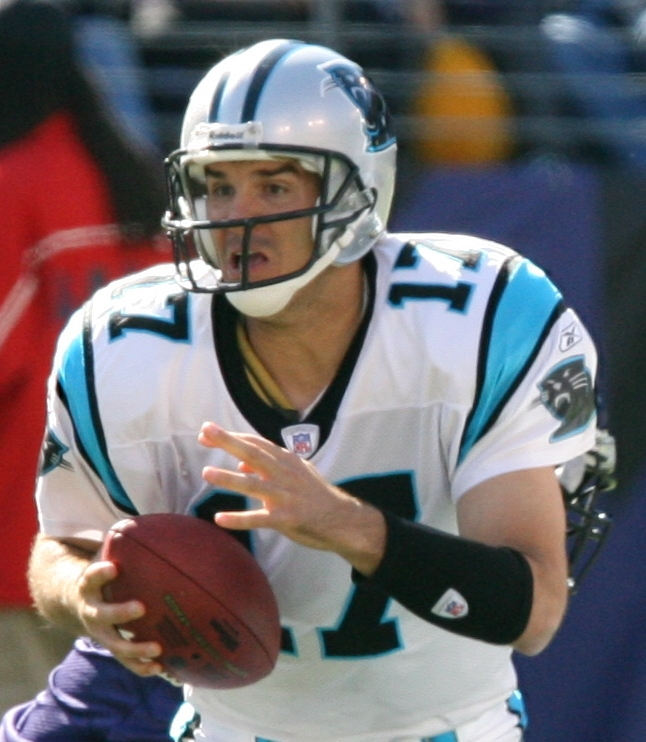
Jake Delhomme is the Ragin' Cajuns' all-time leader in passing yards, and also led in passing touchdowns until 2021.

The Louisiana Ragin' Cajuns football statistical leaders are individual statistical leaders of the Louisiana Ragin' Cajuns football program in various categories, including passing, rushing, receiving, total offense, defensive statistics, and kicking. Within those areas, the lists identify single-game, single-season, and career leaders. The Ragin' Cajuns represent the University of Louisiana at Lafayette in the NCAA's Sun Belt Conference.

Although Louisiana began competing in intercollegiate football in 1902, the school's official record book considers the "modern era" to have begun in 1949. Records from before this year are often incomplete and inconsistent, and they are generally not included in these lists.

These lists are dominated by more recent players for several reasons:

- Since 1949, seasons have increased from 10 games to 11 and then 12 games in length.
- The NCAA didn't allow freshmen to play varsity football until 1972 (with the exception of the World War II years), allowing players to have four-year careers.
- Bowl games only began counting toward single-season and career statistics in 2002. The Ragin' Cajuns have played in nine bowl games since this decision (all since 2011). This has given many recent players an extra game to accumulate statistics. While two of Louisiana's nine bowl appearances are not recognized by the NCAA due to sanctions imposed by that body, individual statistics from those games are recognized by the NCAA, provided that the players involved were not declared ineligible.
- The Sun Belt Conference has held a championship game since 2018. The Ragin' Cajuns qualified for the first four editions (2018–2021), although the 2020 edition was not played due to COVID-19 issues. This has given players in those seasons an extra game in which to accumulate statistics.
- Due to COVID-19 disruptions throughout college football, the NCAA ruled that the 2020 season would not count against the eligibility of any football player, giving every player who participated in that season the chance for five years of eligibility instead of the normal four.

These lists are updated through the 2025 season.

== Passing ==
=== Passing yards ===
Career
Rk	Player	Yards	Years
1	Jake Delhomme	9,216	1993 1994 1995 1996
2	Levi Lewis	9,203	2017 2018 2019 2020 2021
3	Terrance Broadway	7,556	2012 2013 2014
4	Jerry Babb	6,241	2003 2004 2005 2006
5	Brian Mitchell	5,447	1986 1987 1988 1989
6	Jon Van Cleave	5,267	2001 2002 2003 2004
7	Chris Masson	4,757	2008 2009 2010 2011
8	Roy Henry	4,656	1975 1976 1977
9	Ben Wooldridge	4,622	2022 2023 2024
10	Blaine Gautier	4,159	2009 2010 2011 2012

Single season
Rk	Player	Yards	Year
1	Levi Lewis	3,050	2019
2	Blaine Gautier	2,958	2011
3	Levi Lewis	2,917	2021
4	Jake Delhomme	2,901	1996
5	Terrance Broadway	2,842	2012
6	Jake Delhomme	2,761	1995
7	Jon Van Cleave	2,499	2001
8	Ben Wooldridge	2,453	2024
9	Terrance Broadway	2,419	2013
10	Chris Masson	2,406	2009

Single game
Rk	Player	Yards	Year	Opponent
1	Eric Rekieta	473	2003	Louisiana-Monroe
2	Blaine Gautier	470	2011	San Diego State (New Orleans Bowl)
3	Jerry Babb	435	2003	Middle Tennessee
4	Blaine Gautier	419	2011	Western Kentucky
5	Jon Van Cleave	407	2001	Idaho
6	Jon Van Cleave	396	2002	Middle Tennessee
7	Brad McGuire	384	2010	Ohio
8	Terrance Broadway	374	2012	Arkansas State
9	Terrance Broadway	373	2012	Louisiana–Monroe
	Ben Wooldridge	373	2024	Coastal Carolina

=== Passing touchdowns ===
Career
Rk	Player	TDs	Years
1	Levi Lewis	74	2017 2018 2019 2020 2021
2	Jake Delhomme	64	1993 1994 1995 1996
3	Terrance Broadway	49	2012 2013 2014
4	Roy Henry	40	1975 1976 1977
5	Ben Wooldridge	37	2022 2023 2024
6	Jerry Babb	30	2003 2004 2005 2006
7	Blaine Gautier	29	2009 2010 2011
8	Jon Van Cleave	24	2001 2002 2003 2004
	Chris Masson	24	2008 2009 2010 2011
	Chandler Fields	24	2019 2020 2021 2022 2023 2024

Single season
Rk	Player	TDs	Year
1	Levi Lewis	26	2019
2	Blaine Gautier	23	2011
3	Jake Delhomme	20	1995
	Jake Delhomme	20	1996
	Levi Lewis	19	2021
6	Terrance Broadway	19	2013
	Levi Lewis	19	2020
8	Roy Henry	18	1976
9	Terrance Broadway	17	2012
	Ben Wooldridge	17	2024

Single game
Rk	Player	TDs	Year	Opponent
1	Jake Delhomme	5	1996	Northern Illinois
	Andre Nunez	5	2018	New Mexico State
	Ben Wooldridge	5	2022	Louisiana
4	14 times	4	Most recent: Levi Lewis, 2019 vs. Appalachian State (Sun Belt Championship Game)	

== Rushing ==
=== Rushing yards ===
Career
Rk	Player	Yards	Years
1	Tyrell Fenroy	4,646	2005 2006 2007 2008
2	Elijah McGuire	4,312	2013 2014 2015 2016
3	Trey Ragas	3,572	2017 2018 2019 2020
4	Brian Mitchell	3,335	1986 1987 1988 1989
5	Alonzo Harris	3,330	2011 2012 2013 2014
6	Elijah Mitchell	3,259	2017 2018 2019 2020
7	Michael Desormeaux	2,843	2005 2006 2007 2008
8	Darren Brister	2,432	1996 1998 1999 2000
9	Kenyon Cotton	2,311	1993 1994 1995 1996
10	Chris Smith	2,166	2019 2020 2021 2022

Single season
Rk	Player	Yards	Year
1	Tyrell Fenroy	1,375	2008
2	Brian Mitchell	1,311	1989
3	Elijah McGuire	1,264	2014
4	Tyrell Fenroy	1,197	2006
5	Trey Ragas	1,181	2018
6	Elijah Mitchell	1,147	2019
7	Michael Desormeaux	1,141	2007
8	Elijah McGuire	1,127	2016
9	Elijah McGuire	1,058	2015
10	Tyrell Fenroy	1,053	2005

Single game
Rk	Player	Yards	Year	Opponent
1	Tyrell Fenroy	297	2008	Louisiana-Monroe
2	Brian Mitchell	271	1987	Colorado State
3	Elijah McGuire	265	2014	Arkansas State
4	F. G. Mixon	261	1951	Stephen F. Austin
5	Chris Smith	238	2021	Arkansas State
6	Brian Mitchell	232	1989	Arkansas State
7	Elijah McGuire	223	2016	South Alabama
8	Dwayne Williams	222	1986	Tulane
9	Brian Mitchell	214	1989	Lamar
10	Darren Brister	204	1996	Arkansas State

=== Rushing touchdowns ===
Career
Rk	Player	TDs	Years
1	Tyrell Fenroy	48	2005 2006 2007 2008
2	Brian Mitchell	47	1986 1987 1988 1989
3	Alonzo Harris	44	2011 2012 2013 2014
4	Elijah McGuire	42	2013 2014 2015 2016
5	Elijah Mitchell	41	2017 2018 2019 2020
6	Trey Ragas	38	2017 2018 2019 2020
7	Kenyon Cotton	25	1993 1994 1995 1996
8	Jerome Coleman	21	2000 2001 2002
9	Terrance Broadway	20	2012 2013 2014
10	Jerry Babb	19	2003 2004 2005 2006

Single season
Rk	Player	TDs	Year
1	Brian Mitchell	19	1989
	Tyrell Fenroy	19	2008
3	Elijah Mitchell	16	2019
4	Brian Mitchell	15	1988
5	Marcus Prier	14	1995
	Alonzo Harris	14	2013
	Elijah McGuire	14	2014
8	Elijah McGuire	13	2015
	Elijah Mitchell	13	2018
10	Tyrell Fenroy	12	2005
	Montrell Johnson	12	2021

Single game
Rk	Player	TDs	Year	Opponent
1	Brian Mitchell	5	1989	Lamar
	Alonzo Harris	5	2014	South Alabama
	Elijah McGuire	5	2015	Northwestern State
4	9 times	4	Most recent: Alonzo Harris & Elijah McGuire, 2014 vs. Arkansas State	

== Receiving ==
=== Receptions ===
Career
Rk	Player	Rec	Years
1	Brandon Stokley	241	1995 1996 1997 1998
2	Fred Stamps	180	2000 2001 2002 2003
3	Wayde Butler	172	1989 1990 1991 1992
4	Ja'Marcus Bradley	160	2016 2017 2018 2019
5	Jamal Robinson	156	2011 2012 2013 2014
6	Bill Sampy	155	2002 2003 2004 2005
7	Ladarius Green	149	2008 2009 2010 2011
8	Al Riles	140	2013 2014 2015 2016
	Peter LeBlanc	140	2019 2020 2021 2022 2023
10	Javone Lawson	134	2009 2010 2011 2012

Single season
Rk	Player	Rec	Year
1	Brandon Stokley	81	1996
2	Brandon Stokley	75	1995
3	Brandon Stokley	65	1998
4	Harry Peoples	64	2012
5	Javone Lawson	63	2011
6	Fred Stamps	62	2003
7	Nick Dugas	60	2001
	Al Riles	60	2016
	Ja'Marcus Bradley	60	2019
10	Dave Oliver	59	1976

Single game
Rk	Player	Rec	Year	Opponent
1	Nick Dugas	14	2001	Arkansas State
2	Fred Stamps	13	2003	Middle Tennessee
	Ladarius Green	13	2011	Louisiana-Monroe
	Harry Peoples	13	2012	Western Kentucky
5	Brandon Stokley	12	1995	Louisiana Tech
	Harry Peoples	12	2011	Florida Atlantic
	Jamal Robinson	12	2015	New Mexico State
	Keenan Barnes	12	2017	Texas A&M

=== Receiving yards ===
Career
Rk	Player	Yards	Years
1	Brandon Stokley	3,702	1995 1996 1997 1998
2	Fred Stamps	2,789	2000 2001 2002 2003
3	Jamal Robinson	2,653	2011 2012 2013 2014 2015
4	Ja'Marcus Bradley	2,359	2016 2017 2018 2019
5	Donald Richard	2,326	1993 1994 1995 1996
6	Ladarius Green	2,201	2008 2009 2010 2011
7	Javone Lawson	2,107	2009 2010 2011 2012
8	Wayde Butler	2,076	1989 1990 1991 1992
9	Bill Sampy	1,988	2002 2003 2004 2005
10	Willie Culpepper	1,967	1985 1986 1987 1988

Single season
Rk	Player	Yards	Year
1	Brandon Stokley	1,173	1998
2	Brandon Stokley	1,160	1996
3	Brandon Stokley	1,121	1995
4	Javone Lawson	1,092	2011
5	Fred Stamps	1,002	2002
6	Fred Stamps	973	2003

Single game
Rk	Player	Yards	Year	Opponent
1	Willie Culpepper	220	1986	McNeese State
2	Fred Stamps	201	2003	Middle Tennessee
3	Fred Stamps	198	2003	Louisiana-Monroe
4	Javone Lawson	193	2011	San Diego State (New Orleans Bowl)
5	Brandon Stokley	190	1996	Louisiana Tech

=== Receiving touchdowns ===
Career
Rk	Player	TDs	Years
1	Brandon Stokley	25	1995 1996 1997 1998
2	Ja'Marcus Bradley	23	2016 2017 2018 2019
3	Ladarius Green	22	2008 2009 2010 2011
4	Donald Richard	20	1993 1994 1995 1996
	Jamal Robinson	20	2011 2012 2013 2014 2015
6	Fred Stamps	19	2000 2001 2002 2003
7	Javone Lawson	15	2009 2010 2011 2012
8	Darryl Surgent	14	2010 2011 2012 2013

Single season
Rk	Player	TDs	Year
1	Dave Oliver	10	1976
	Donald Richard	10	1996
	Ja'Marcus Bradley	10	2018
	Ja'Marcus Bradley	10	2019
5	Charles Gaudin	9	1951
	Brandon Stokley	9	1995
7	Brandon Stokley	8	1998
	Fred Stamps	8	2002
	Ladarius Green	8	2011
	Javone Lawson	8	2011
	Jamal Robinson	8	2013

Single game
Rk	Player	TDs	Year	Opponent
1	Calvin Jones	3	1977	Louisiana Tech
	Marcus Carter	3	1993	Tulane
	Brandon Stokley	3	1998	Arkansas State
	Fred Stamps	3	2003	Middle Tennessee
	Jason Chery	3	2008	North Texas
	Ja'Marcus Bradley	3	2018	South Alabama

== Total offense ==
Total offense is the sum of passing and rushing statistics. It does not include receiving or returns.

=== Total offense yards ===
Career
Rk	Player	Yards	Years
1	Levi Lewis	10,291	2017 2018 2019 2020 2021
2	Terrance Broadway	9,420	2012 2013 2014
3	Jake Delhomme	8,876	1993 1994 1995 1996
4	Brian Mitchell	8,782	1986 1987 1988 1989
5	Jerry Babb	7,730	2003 2004 2005 2006
6	Michael Desormeaux	6,736	2005 2006 2007 2008
7	Jon Van Cleave	5,269	2002 2003 2004
8	Ben Wooldridge	5,056	2022 2023 2024
9	Blaine Gautier	5,042	2009 2010 2011 2012
10	Chris Masson	4,975	2008 2009 2010 2011

Single season
Rk	Player	Yards	Year
1	Terrance Broadway	3,611	2012
2	Blaine Gautier	3,444	2011
3	Brian Mitchell	3,277	1989
4	Levi Lewis	3,260	2021
5	Levi Lewis	3,245	2019
6	Terrance Broadway	2,948	2014
7	Michael Desormeaux	2,911	2008
8	Terrance Broadway	2,861	2013
9	Jake Delhomme	2,822	1996
10	Jake Delhomme	2,769	1995

Single game
Rk	Player	Yards	Year	Opponent
1	Blaine Gautier	492	2011	San Diego State (New Orleans Bowl)
2	Brian Mitchell	476	1987	Colorado State
	Eric Rekieta	476	2003	Louisiana-Monroe
4	Jerry Babb	474	2003	Middle Tennessee
5	Terrance Broadway	460	2012	Louisiana-Monroe

=== Touchdowns responsible for ===
"Touchdowns responsible for" is the official NCAA term for combined passing and rushing touchdowns. The 2021 Louisiana media guide does not list leaders in this statistic over any time frame, although past editions have done so.

Career
Rk	Player	TDs	Years
1	Levi Lewis	88	2017 2018 2019 2020 2021
2	Brian Mitchell	70	1986 1987 1988 1989
	Jake Delhomme	70	1993 1994 1995 1996
4	Terrance Broadway	69	2012 2013 2014
5	Jerry Babb	49	2003 2004 2005 2006
6	Tyrell Fenroy	48	2005 2006 2007 2008
7	Roy Henry	47	1975 1976 1977
8	Ben Wooldridge	46	2022 2023 2024
9	Alonzo Harris	44	2011 2012 2013 2014
10	Blaine Gautier	41	2009 2010 2011 2012

Single season
Rk	Player	TDs	Year
1	Levi Lewis	29	2019
2	Terrance Broadway	27	2013
3	Blaine Gautier	26	2011
	Terrance Broadway	26	2012
5	Brian Mitchell	25	1989
	Levi Lewis	25	2021
7	Levi Lewis	24	2020
8	Brian Mitchell	23	1988
9	Ben Wooldridge	22	2024
10	Jake Delhomme	21	1995

== Defense ==
=== Interceptions ===
Career
Rk	Player	Ints	Years
1	Mike McDonald	21	1968 1969 1970 1971
2	Ron Irving	19	1976 1977 1978
3	Orlando Thomas	18	1991 1992 1993 1994
4	Ed Pratt	17	1964 1965 1966 1967
5	Bralen Trahan	13	2017 2018 2019 2020 2021 2022
6	Charles Tillman	12	1999 2000 2001 2002

Single season
Rk	Player	Ints	Year
1	Ed Pratt	9	1965
	Mike McDonald	9	1970
	Orlando Thomas	9	1993
4	Mike McDonald	8	1968
	Ron Irving	8	1976

Single game
Rk	Player	Ints	Year	Opponent
1	Mike McDonald	4	1970	Northeast Louisiana

=== Tackles ===
Career
Rk	Player	Tackles	Years
1	Steve Spinella	386	1982 1983 1984 1985
2	Orlando Thomas	347	1991 1992 1993 1994
3	Chris Jacobs	326	1982 1983 1984 1985
4	Dale Thomas	311	1977 1978 1979 1980
5	Antwyne Zanders	308	2006 2007 2008 2009
6	Charles Tillman	284	1999 2000 2001 2002
7	Frank Bartley	278	1976 1977 1978
8	K.C. Ossai	277	2021 2022 2023 2024
9	Randy Thomas	272	1977 1978 1979 1980
10	Charles Pool	270	1991 1992 1993
	Kyries Hebert	270	1999 2000 2001

Single season
Rk	Player	Tackles	Year
1	Frank Bartley	208	1978
2	Steve Spinella	144	1985
3	Damon Mason	135	1996
4	Steve Spinella	131	1984
	Justin Anderson	131	2013
6	Jaden Dugger	125	2025
7	Chris Jacobs	120	1985

Single game
Rk	Player	Tackles	Year	Opponent
1	Frank Bartley	30	1978	Southern Illinois

=== Sacks ===
Career
Rk	Player	Sacks	Years
1	Jeff Mitchell	21.0	1992 1993 1994 1995
	Christian Ringo	21.0	2011 2012 2013 2014
3	Zi'Yon Hill-Green	20.0	2017 2018 2019 2020 2021 2022
4	Paul Cabbie	19.0	1993 1994 1995 1996
	Chauncey Manac	19.0	2018 2019 2020 2021
6	Joe Dillon	18.5	2016 2017 2019 2020
7	Chris Gannon	18.0	1985 1986 1987 1988
	Jordan Lawson	18.0	2022 2023 2024 2025
9	Walter Sampson	16.5	1999 2000 2001 2002

Single season
Rk	Player	Sacks	Year
1	Christian Ringo	11.5	2014
2	Conrad Lewis	11.0	1993
	Jeff Mitchell	11.0	1993
4	Chauncey Manac	10.5	2021
5	Paul Cabbie	9.0	1996
	Joe Dillon	9.0	2019
7	Danny Scott	8.0	1998
	Cameron Whitfield	8.0	2023

Single game
Rk	Player	Sacks	Year	Opponent
1	Rodney Hardeway	4.0	2007	Middle Tennessee
	Chauncey Manac	4.0	2021	Liberty
	Cameron Whitfield	4.0	2024	Southern Miss

== Kicking ==
=== Field goals made ===
Career
Rk	Player	FGs	Years
1	Kenneth Almendares	69	2019 2020 2021 2022 2023 2024
2	Steven Artigue	53	2015 2016 2017 2019
3	John Roveto	45	1977 1978 1979
	Brett Baer	45	2010 2011 2012
5	Patrick Broussard	44	1984 1985 1986 1987
6	Sean Comiskey	42	2002 2003 2004 2005
7	Mike Lemoine	38	1988 1989 1990

Single season
Rk	Player	FGs	Year
1	Kenneth Almendares	28	2024
2	Brett Baer	20	2012
	Tony Sterner	20	2025
4	John Roveto	19	1977
	Steven Artigue	19	2016
6	Brett Baer	18	2011
	Hunter Stover	18	2014
	Kenneth Almendares	18	2022
9	Steven Artigue	16	2019
10	Rafael Septién	15	1974

Single game
Rk	Player	FGs	Year	Opponent
1	Rafael Septién	6	1974	San Jose State
	Mike Lemoine	6	1989	Central Michigan

=== Field goal percentage ===
Career
Rk	Player	FG%	Years
1	Brett Baer	90.0%	2010 2011 2012

Single season
Rk	Player	FG%	Year
1	Mike Shafer	100.0%	1994
	Brett Baer	100.0%	2010
3	Brett Baer	90.0%	2011
