= 2022 Independence Bowl =

Postseason college football bowl game

2022 Radiance Technologies Independence Bowl
- 46th Independence Bowl
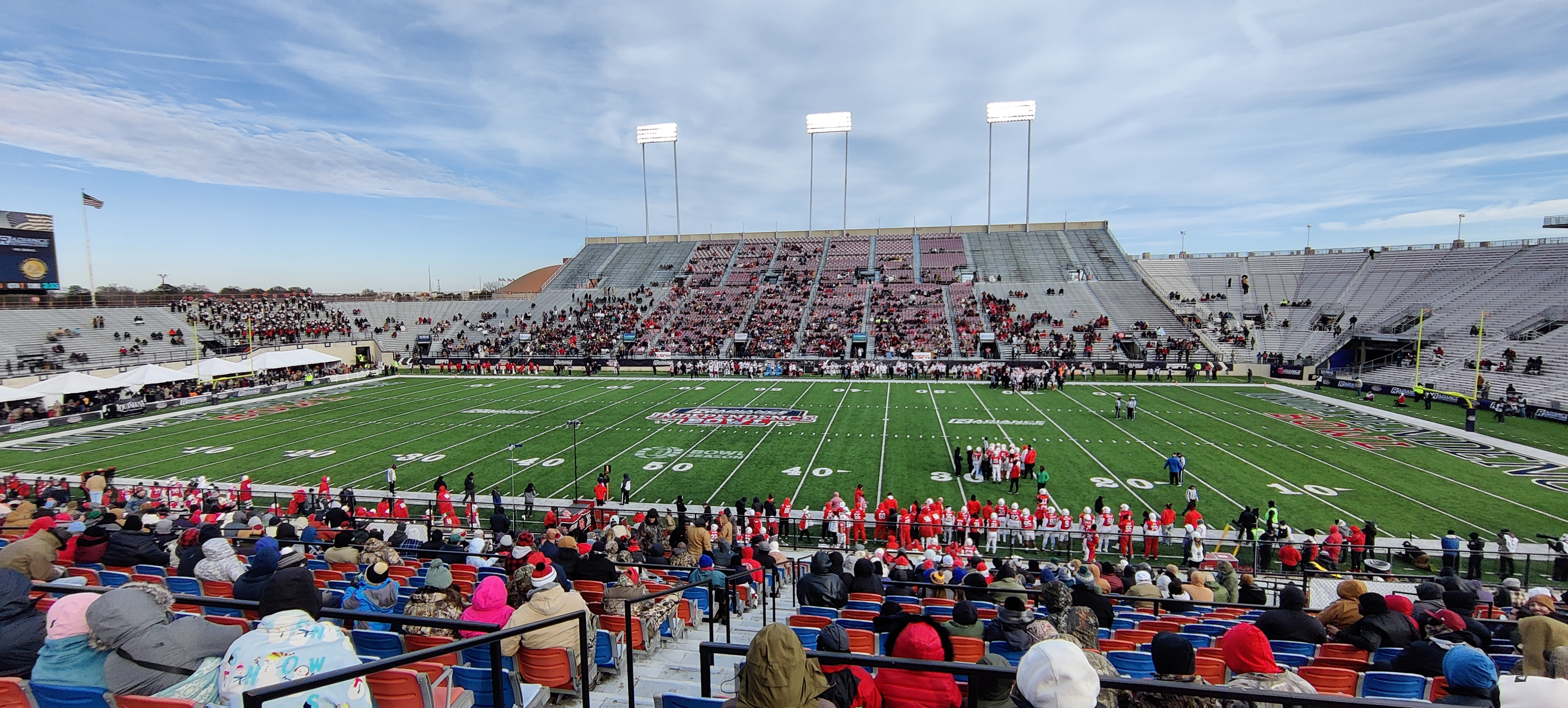
- Independence Stadium during the first quarter
Louisiana Ragin' Cajuns	Houston Cougars
(6–6)	(7–5)
Sun Belt	The American
16	23
Head coach: Michael Desormeaux	Head coach: Dana Holgorsen
	1	2	3	4	Total
Louisiana	7	9	0	0	16
Houston	0	6	7	10	23
- Date: December 23, 2022
- Season: 2022
- Stadium: Independence Stadium
- Location: Shreveport, Louisiana
- MVP: Clayton Tune (QB, Houston) & Art Green (DB, Houston)
- Favorite: Houston by 5
- Referee: Scott Hardin (C–USA)
- Attendance: 23,410
- Payout: US$2,200,000

United States TV coverage
- Network: ESPN
- Announcers: Dave Neal (play-by-play), Deuce McAllister (analyst), and Harry Lyles Jr. (sideline)

International TV coverage
- Network: ESPN Deportes

The 2022 Independence Bowl was an American college football bowl game played on December 23, 2022, at Independence Stadium in Shreveport, Louisiana. The 46th annual Independence Bowl, it began at 2:04 p.m. CST and was aired on ESPN. The game featured the Louisiana Ragin' Cajuns from the Sun Belt Conference and the Houston Cougars from the American Athletic Conference. It was one of the 2022–23 bowl games concluding the 2022 FBS football season. Sponsored by engineering services company Radiance Technologies, the game was officially known as the Radiance Technologies Independence Bowl.

Louisiana started the game by scoring a touchdown on their first drive of the game, which took nearly half of the first quarter, and they extended their lead to 13–0 by successfully converting two field goals within the first eight minutes of the second quarter. Houston scored their first points with a 33-yard pass by quarterback Clayton Tune with three minutes remaining until halftime but the extra point was unsuccessful and the Ragin' Cajuns' lead remained seven points. Louisiana took a 16–6 lead into halftime with the help of a third made field goal with two seconds left in the half, but those were the last points recorded by the Ragin' Cajuns; another passing touchdown by Tune proved to be the only scoring play of the third quarter, a Cougars field goal tied the game at 16 points apiece early in the fourth quarter, and a touchdown with twenty seconds left in the game gave Houston their first lead and the win shortly thereafter.

== Teams ==
The bowl has tie-ins with Conference USA and FBS independent Army. However, this year it featured the Louisiana Ragin' Cajuns from the Sun Belt Conference and the Houston Cougars from the American Athletic Conference (AAC or "The American"). Despite Army's 6–6 record, they were not bowl eligible due to two of their wins coming against Football Championship Subdivision (FCS) teams. This was the 10th meeting between Houston and Louisiana; the Cougars led the all-time series, 6–3, entering the game. The teams first met in 1946 and had most recently played on October 7, 2006, when Louisiana defeated Houston, 31–28.

=== Louisiana ===
The Ragin' Cajuns, from the Sun Belt Conference, ended the regular season with a record of 6–6 (4–4 in conference play). Their coach was Michael Desormeaux, in his first year. This was the tenth bowl game appearance for Louisiana; they had a 7–2 record in prior games but an official record of 5–2 after two of their victories were vacated due to penalties handed down by the NCAA because of infractions committed by former coach David Saunders. Their last bowl game was the 2021 New Orleans Bowl, which they won; this was their first Independence Bowl appearance.

Louisiana's defense entered the game having been a bright spot for the team during the season, as they ranked in the top 25 nationally in turnover margin. On offense, Louisiana was without quarterback Ben Wooldridge due to an injury, while wide receiver Michael Jefferson and defensive end Andrew Jones opted out due to draft preparation.

=== Houston ===
The Cougars, a member of the American Athletic Conference, finished the regular season with a record of 7–5 (5–3 in conference play). The Cougars were led by fourth-year head coach Dana Holgorsen. The Cougars made their 30th all-time bowl game appearance, and they entered with a 12–16–1 record in prior bowl games having last played in the 2021 Birmingham Bowl. This was the Cougars' first Independence Bowl appearance. This was Houston's final game as a member of the American Athletic Conference, as the Cougars are set to join the Big 12 Conference in 2023.

The Houston offense was led by quarterback Clayton Tune, who entered the game with the AAC record for career touchdown passes with 101 and needed two touchdown passes in the game to pass Tanner Mordecai for the AAC single-season record. Tune had wide receiver Nathaniel Dell for the game, despite Dell's declaration for the NFL draft. The Houston defense, in contrast, did not enter the game as strongly, as they ranked No. 110 nationally in scoring defense and were generally regarded as the team's weakest aspect.

Holgorsen wore a black hoodie with "STATE" on the front as an homage to his late mentor and coach Mike Leach, who died on December 12, 2022. Holgorsen played for Leach at Iowa Wesleyan University and was a part of Leach's coaching staff at Texas Tech; at the time of his death, Leach was the head coach at Mississippi State.

== Game summary ==
The Independence Bowl was televised by ESPN, with a commentary team of Dave Neal, Deuce McAllister, and Harry Lyles Jr. The game's officiating crew, representing Conference USA, was led by referee Scott Hardin and umpire Antonio Barrial. The game was played at Independence Stadium in Shreveport, Louisiana, where the weather at kickoff was clear with a temperature of 25 °F (−4 °C) and a wind chill of 12 °F (−11 °C).

=== First half ===
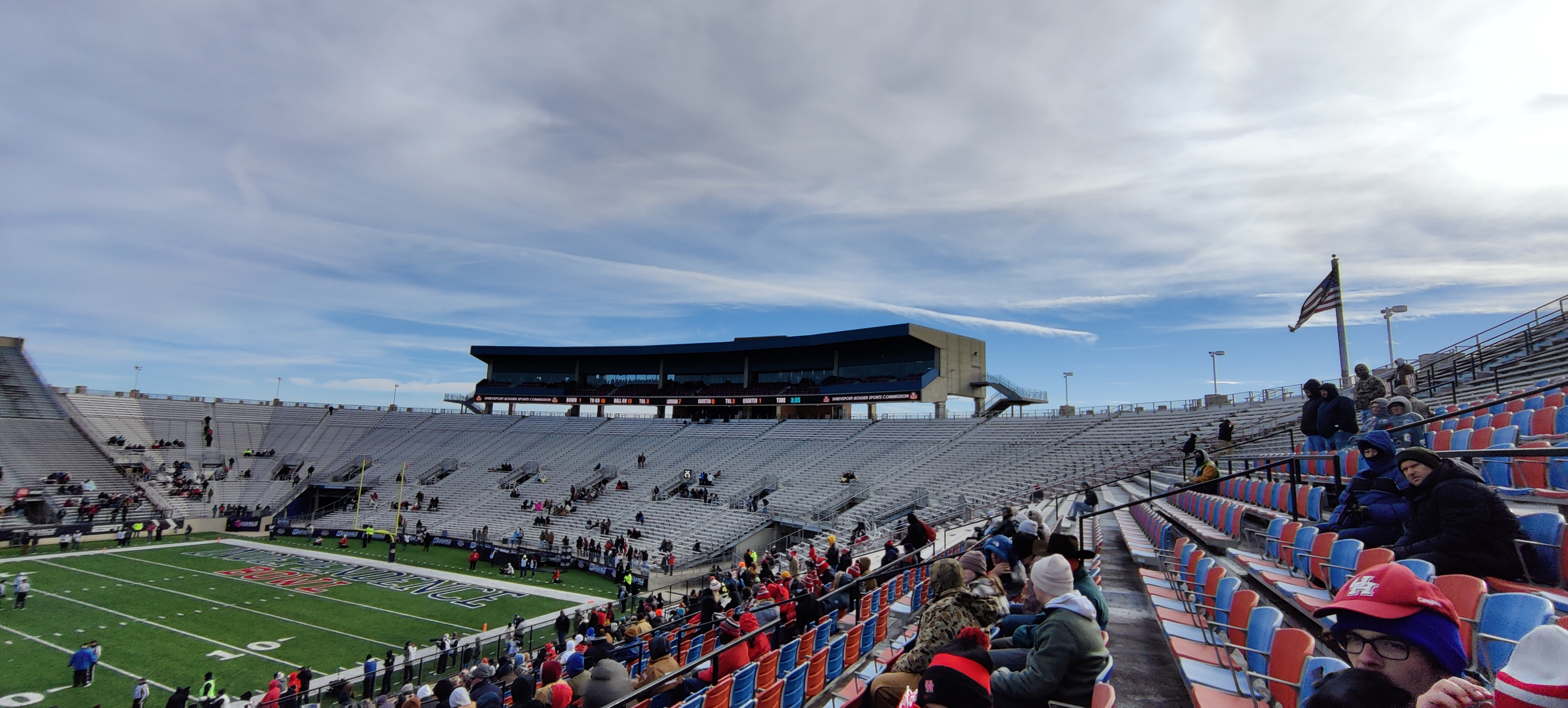
The south end zone and stands at Independence Stadium during the first quarter.

The game began at 2:05 p.m. CST with the opening kickoff by Kyle Ramsey. Louisiana's opening drive was a long one, as they drove 75 yards in 15 plays, converting two third downs and a fourth down along the way. After nearly seven and a half minutes, the Ragin' Cajuns found the end zone as quarterback Chandler Fields passed to wide receiver Johnny Lumpkin for a 4-yard touchdown for the game's first points. Houston faced a 4th & 1 early into their opening drive and converted it, though their next series ended in a fourth-and-long and the Cougars punted. Louisiana punted for the first time on their next drive, though the kick went only 19 yards and was downed at the Houston 48-yard-line. Houston faced 3rd & 6 early in their next drive, and converted, before a 4-yard rush by Brandon Campbell ended the quarter.

Clayton Tune was sacked on the first play of the second quarter and two plays later, Houston failed to convert 4th & 1 and turned the ball over on downs to the Ragin' Cajuns. Several completions by Fields and a long rush by Dre'lyn Washington set up a 42-yard field goal attempt for placekicker Kenneth Almendares, which he made to increase Louisiana's lead to ten points. Houston went three-and-out for the first time on their next drive, and the ensuing punt return was returned by Eric Garror to the Houston 27-yard-line. Louisiana's offense was unable to produce much but the Ragin' Cajuns were able to attempt another 42-yard field goal due to their good starting field position. Almendares made this kick too, increasing Louisiana's lead to 13 points. Houston scored for the first time on their next drive, as they drove 80 yards in nine plays and converted a 4th & 2 just past midfield along the way. Their scoring play was a 33-yard completion from Tune to KeSean Carter. Louisiana's final possession of the half was a long 14-play drive that began at their own 12-yard-line and reached the Houston 6-yard-line with 2 seconds remaining, at which point they successfully attempted a 22-yard field goal and entered halftime with a ten-point lead.

=== Second half ===
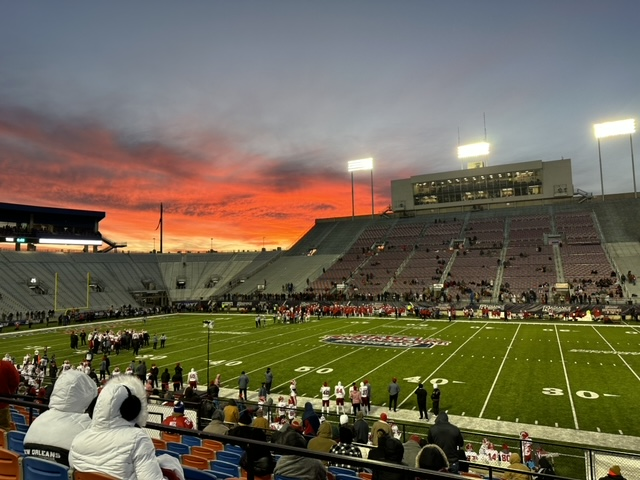
Independence Stadium during the second half

The second half began much like the first with a long drive that ended with a touchdown, though this one was for Houston rather than Louisiana. The Cougars started at their own 30-yard-line and crossed midfield in four plays, after which they ran nine more before reaching the end zone with a 2-yard pass from Tune to Nathaniel Dell. Louisiana gave the ball right back with a fumble on their second play of the quarter, and Houston recovered at the Louisiana 36-yard-line. They were unable to capitalize as they failed to convert 4th & 1 from the Louisiana 5-yard-line, resulting in a turnover on downs. Louisiana gained a first down on their first play but stalled from there as they punted several plays later and gave Houston the ball back at the Louisiana 33-yard-line following the return by Peyton Sawyer. Houston gained several first downs and reached the Louisiana 9-yard-line before a sack by Ja'Marian Peterson and Jourdan Quibodeaux ended the third quarter.

Houston advanced to the Louisiana 2-yard-line but stalled from there and converted a 19-yard field goal to tie the game at 16 points apiece. The Ragin' Cajuns reached the Houston 9-yard-line on their next possession following a 25-yard rush by backup quarterback Zeon Chriss, who entered in place of the injured starter Fields, but fumbled on the next play, and the ball was recovered by Houston's Donavan Mutin. The Cougars went three-and-out and punted from their own 23-yard-line, and Louisiana punted the ball back to Houston after a 5-play drive that gained 11 yards in total. Houston's first play after regaining possession was a 33-yard rush by Tune that reached the Houston 41-yard-line, though a holding penalty set them back ten yards on the next play. A 41-yard pass to KeSean Carter moved the ball into Louisiana territory on the next play, and a rush by Ta'Zhawn Henry on the next play gained 11 yards and another first down. After Tune rushed for 15 yards to advance to the Louisiana 12-yard-line, he completed a pass to Dell for a touchdown to take a seven-point lead with 20 seconds left in the game. Louisiana suffered a sack fumble that they recovered before Chriss threw an interception at their own 45-yard-line. Houston took a knee on their next play, the final snap of the game, to close out a 23–16 win. The game ended at 5:40 p.m. after a total duration of three hours and 36 minutes.

=== Scoring summary ===
2022 Radiance Technologies Independence Bowl

Quarter	1	2	3	4	Total
Louisiana	7	9	0	0	16
Houston	0	6	7	10	23

at Independence Stadium • Shreveport, Louisiana

- Date: Friday, December 23, 2022
- Game time: 2:00 p.m. CST
- Game weather: Sunny • Temperature: 25 °F (−4 °C) • Wind: NW 15 mph (24 km/h)
- Game attendance: 23,410
- Referee: Scott Hardin
- TV announcers (ESPN): Dave Neal (play-by-play), Deuce McAllister (analyst), and Harry Lyles Jr. (sideline)
- Box score

Scoring summary

Quarter	Time	Drive			Team	Scoring information	Score	
Quarter	Time	Plays	Yards	TOP	Team	Scoring information	Louisiana	Houston
1	7:39	15	75	7:21	Louisiana	Johnny Lumpkin 4-yard touchdown reception from Chandler Fields, Kenneth Almendares kick good	7	0
2	9:35	7	39	3:43	Louisiana	42-yard field goal by Kenneth Almendares	10	0
2	7:05	4	3	0:58	Louisiana	42-yard field goal by Kenneth Almendares	13	0
2	3:00	9	80	4:05	Houston	KeSean Carter 33-yard touchdown reception from Clayton Tune, Kyle Ramsey kick no good	13	6
2	0:02	14	82	2:59	Louisiana	32-yard field goal by Kenneth Almendares	16	6
3	9:21	13	70	5:39	Houston	Nathaniel Dell 2-yard touchdown reception from Clayton Tune, Kyle Ramsey kick good	16	13
4	13:40	9	31	4:02	Houston	19-yard field goal by Kyle Ramsey	16	16
4	0:20	6	92	2:39	Houston	Nathaniel Dell 12-yard touchdown reception from Clayton Tune, Kyle Ramsey kick good	16	23
"TOP" = time of possession. For other American football terms, see Glossary of American football.							16	23

== Statistics ==
Team statistical comparison
Statistic	Louisiana	Houston
First downs	21	21
First downs rushing	8	7
First downs passing	11	11
First downs penalty	2	3
Third down efficiency	3–12	3–12
Fourth down efficiency	3–3	3–5
Total plays–net yards	64–323	66–363
Rushing attempts–net yards	33–129	38–147
Yards per rush	3.9	3.9
Yards passing	194	216
Pass completions–attempts	21–31	19–28
Interceptions thrown	1	0
Punt returns–total yards	2–36	1–25
Kickoff returns–total yards	4–35	4–41
Punts–average yardage	3–29.3	3–33.3
Fumbles–lost	3–2	1–0
Penalties–yards	5–58	7–60
Time of possession	29:39	30:21

Louisiana statistics
Ragin' Cajuns passing
	C–A	Yds	TD–INT
Chandler Fields	17–25	169	1–0
Zeon Chriss	4–6	25	0–1
Ragin' Cajuns rushing
	Car	Yds	TD
Chris Smith	15	48	0
Chandler Fields	6	32	0
Zeon Chriss	4	26	0
Dre'lyn Washington	3	11	0
Terrence Williams	5	8	0
Peter LeBlanc	1	4	0
Ragin' Cajuns receiving
	Rec	Yds	TD
Lance Legendre	5	56	0
John Stephens Jr.	3	47	0
Errol Rodgers Jr.	2	21	0
Neal Johnson	3	19	0
Dalen Cambre	1	15	0
Pearse Migl	2	15	0
Johnny Lumpkin	2	14	1
Chris Smith	1	4	0
Terrence Williams	2	3	0

Houston statistics
Cougars passing
	C–A	Yds	TD–INT
Clayton Tune	18–28	229	3–0
Cougars rushing
	Car	Yds	TD
Clayton Tune	11	55	0
Ta'Zhawn Henry	12	45	0
Brandon Campbell	8	22	0
Stacy Sneed	6	12	0
TEAM	1	0	0
Cougars receiving
	Rec	Yds	TD
KeSean Carter	3	104	1
Nathaniel Dell	6	44	2
Joseph Manjack IV	4	35	0
Matthew Golden	2	17	0
Ta'Zhawn Henry	1	14	0
Matt Byrnes	1	13	0
Stacy Sneed	1	2	0
