= Michael Desormeaux =

American football player and coach (born 1985)

Current position
- Title: Head coach
- Team: Louisiana
- Conference: Sun Belt
- Record: 37–28
- Annual salary: $775,000

Biographical details
- Born: September 29, 1985 (age 41); New Iberia, Louisiana, U.S.

Playing career
- 2004–2008: Louisiana–Lafayette
- 2009: Jacksonville Jaguars
- 2009: Calgary Stampeders
- Positions: Quarterback, defensive back

Coaching career (HC unless noted)
- 2010–2012: Catholic HS (LA) (OC/QB)
- 2013–2015: Ascension Episcopal School (LA)
- 2016: Louisiana–Lafayette (RB)
- 2017–2020: Louisiana (TE)
- 2021: Louisiana (co-OC/TE)
- 2022–present: Louisiana

Head coaching record
- Overall: 37–28 (college)
- Bowls: 1–4

Accomplishments and honors

Championships
- As a coach: Sun Belt West Division (2024); New Orleans Bowl champion (2021)

Awards
- As a player: Sun Belt Offensive Player of the Year (2008); 2× First-team All-Sun Belt (2005, 2008); 2× Second-team All-Sun Belt (2006, 2007); As a coach: Sun Belt Coach of the Year (2024)

Michael John Desormeaux (born September 29, 1985) is an American college football coach and former player. He is the head football coach at the University of Louisiana at Lafayette, a position he has held since the final game of the 2021 season. He previously served in various assistant coaching roles at Louisiana from 2016 to 2021, most recently as the co-offensive coordinator and tight ends coach in 2021.

Desormeaux played college football at Louisiana as a quarterback and defensive back from 2004 to 2008, where he ranks in the all-time top ten for passing yards, passing touchdowns, and rushing yards. Desormeaux signed as an undrafted free agent with the Jacksonville Jaguars of the National Football League (NFL) and played for the Calgary Stampeders of the Canadian Football League (CFL). Prior to his tenure at Louisiana, he held various assistant coaching positions at Catholic High School in New Iberia, Louisiana, and Ascension Episcopal School in Lafayette Parish, Louisiana.

== Playing career ==
=== College ===
Desormeaux started playing for the Cajuns in his redshirt freshman year in 2005, going 2–2 as a starter. Following his first season, Desormeaux was one of three freshmen to be named to the All-Sun Belt team and was named to the teams Champion Award at the postseason banquet for his outstanding performance in both throwing and rushing in his first season. Going into his second season, Desormeaux played 12 games on special teams, while also seeing time at quarterback, wide receiver, and defensive back. He was named the Cajuns Special Teams Player of the Week in the losing effort against eighth-ranked LSU where he recovered two fumbles. He was named the Cajuns Offensive Player of the Week in the losing effort against Texas A&M where he scored the lone touchdown in an eight-yard rush. Following the season, Desormeaux was named the recipient of the Robert E. Trahan Achievement Team Award for an individual who achieves many accomplishments with the help of his teammates.

In his junior and senior years, Desormeaux became the starting quarterback after Jerry Babb's departure. Desormeaux would soon become one of the most famous Cajuns players in history, tying and breaking numerous records, including ranking third for 1,000+ rushing yards in history and finishing 20th for most rushing yards by a quarterback in NCAA history. Throughout his time, Desormeaux was named to numerous lists, including 2005 First-team All-Sun Belt Team, 2006 and 2007 Second-team All-Sun Belt Team, 2005–06, 2006–07, and 2007–08 Sun Belt Conference Commissioner's List.

=== Professional ===
Desormeaux was signed as an undrafted free agent by the Jacksonville Jaguars on April 26, 2009. After being waived on September 5, Desormeaux was signed to the Jaguars' practice squad on September 6. He was released on September 21. Desormeaux signed a practice roster agreement with the Calgary Stampeders on October 8, 2009.

== Coaching career ==
=== Early career ===
Following his retirement from playing professional football, Desormeaux returned home and took over the reins as the offensive coordinator and quarterbacks coach at his alma mater, Catholic High School in New Iberia, Louisiana where he stayed for four seasons. In 2013, he became the head coach at Ascension Episcopal School in Youngsville, LA where he won 24 games in three seasons and took the Blue Gators to the Division IV state semifinals in 2015. In 2016, Desormeaux joined the University of Louisiana at Lafayette as their wide receivers coach. On December 3, 2017, following the firing of head coach Mark Hudspeth during the offseason, Desormeaux was named as interim head coach. On December 15, 2017, the University of Louisiana at Lafayette named Billy Napier as their new head coach of the Ragin' Cajuns. After Napier was hired, Desormeaux was retained and named assistant head coach and tight ends coach. Following Napier's departure to become the head coach at the University of Florida on December 5, 2021, Desormeaux was named interim head coach for the Ragin' Cajuns in the 2021 New Orleans Bowl to conclude the 2021 season.

=== Louisiana ===
==== 2022 season ====
On December 5, 2021, Desormeaux was named the 27th head coach at the University of Louisiana at Lafayette, replacing Billy Napier following his departure to become the head coach at the University of Florida. The season finished with the Cajuns going 6–6 and a surprise visit to the Independence Bowl in Shreveport, LA.

== Personal life ==
Desormeaux and his wife, Lindsey, have two children, Thomas and Elle. He is a distant cousin of horse jockey Kent Desormeaux.

== Head coaching record ==
=== College ===
Year	Team	Overall	Conference	Standing	Bowl/playoffs	Coaches^{#}	AP^{°}
Louisiana Ragin' Cajuns (Sun Belt Conference) (2021–present)
2021	Louisiana	1–0 (Note: Louisiana head coach Billy Napier was hired as the head coach at the University of Florida on November 28, 2021, and departed from Louisiana before their bowl game. As a result, Desormeaux served as interim head coach and coached Louisiana in the 2021 New Orleans Bowl.)			W New Orleans	18	16
2022	Louisiana	6–7	4–4	T–3rd (West)	L Independence		
2023	Louisiana	6–7	3–5	5th (West)	L New Orleans		
2024	Louisiana	10–4	7–1	1st (West)	L New Mexico		
2025	Louisiana	6–7	5–3	T–2nd (West)	L 68 Ventures		
2026	Louisiana	8–3	5–2	(West)			
Louisiana:		37–28	24–15				
Total:		37–28					
