= Peyton Woodring =

American football player (born 2004)

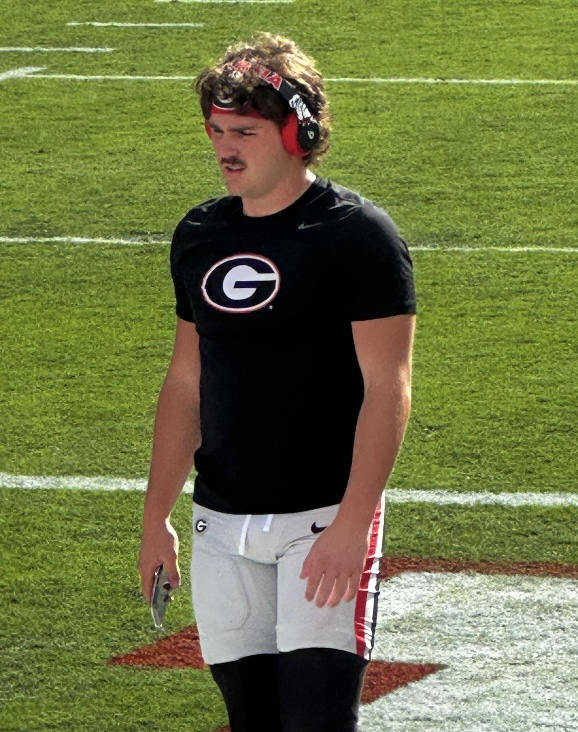
- Woodring in 2025

No. 91 – Georgia Bulldogs
- Position: Placekicker
- Class: Senior

Personal information
- Born: September 22, 2004 (age 22); Lafayette, Louisiana, U.S.
- Listed height: 5 ft 10 in (1.78 m)
- Listed weight: 190 lb (86 kg)

Career information
- High school: Ascension Episcopal (Youngsville, Louisiana)
- College: Georgia (2023–present)

Awards and highlights
- 2× Second-team All-SEC (2024, 2025)
- Stats at ESPN

Peyton Thomas Woodring (born September 22, 2004) is an American college football placekicker for the Georgia Bulldogs of the Southeastern Conference (SEC).

== Early life ==
Peyton Woodring was born on September 22, 2004, in Lafayette, Louisiana. He attended Ascension Episcopal School in Youngsville, Louisiana, where he played baseball and football. Woodring played soccer in middle school and didn't plan to play football at the high school level until his father suggested he try out for the team. After tryouts, Woodring was named the starting kicker for Ascension Episcopal. Following his freshman year, Woodring enlisted at a summer camp run by Kohl's Professional Camps, an organization for kickers, punters, and long snappers, where he competed against the best players across the positions.

In his junior year, Woodring made 14 out of 19 field goals attempted, including a school record 56-yard attempt. For his efforts, Woodring was named an All-American by MaxPreps and was nominated to play in the Under Armour All-America Game.

Before his senior year, Woodring’s final two schools that he was considering committing to were Alabama and Georgia. Woodring initially was quietly committed to Alabama, but after Georgia offered Woodring a scholarship, he declared his commitment to Georgia. During his senior year, Woodring made a 60-yard field goal, which set the new state record for the longest field goal in Louisiana high school football history. By the end of his senior year, Woodring was named the #1 kicker recruit by Kohl's and ESPN. Woodring also performed well in baseball, posting a 1.43 ERA along with a .385 batting average in his senior year, with him being named to the All-Acadiana Metro team.

== College career ==
=== 2023 ===
Going into his freshman season at Georgia, Woodring competed with Jared Zirkel and Henry Bates for the starting kicking position. Woodring won the starting job, and became the first true freshman to start a season opener as kicker since Marshall Morgan in 2012. Woodring underperformed at the beginning of the season, making 4 out of 7 field goals, and faced pressure of losing his starting job. However, against Auburn, Woodring made 2 of 2 field goals in a comeback win, and was named SEC Co-Freshman of the Week for his performance. Woodring was again named Co-Freshman of the Week the following week against Kentucky and for the third time in a row against Vanderbilt for making 3 of 3 field goals in both games. Against Missouri, Woodring again hit 3 of 3 field goals, including a season-high 48-yard attempt, en route to being named SEC Co-Player of the Week along with teammate Nazir Stackhouse. Overall, Woodring made 21 out of 25 field goals and 71/71 PATs, with him only missing one attempt after going 4 for 7, and was named a Lou Groza Award semifinalist.

=== 2024 ===
Woodring was named the starter before his sophomore season. In the season opener against Clemson, Woodring made 2 of 2 field goals, including a career-high 55-yard attempt, with him being named SEC Special Teams Player of the Week as a result. Woodring also hit two 53-yard field goals in the season, against Florida and UMass. Woodring improved his field goals made percentage in his second year, making 21 out of 23 attempts for a 91.3% accuracy mark, along with making 48/48 PATs. He was again named a Lou Groza Award semifinalist. Additionally, Woodring was named to the All-SEC second-team as kicker by the Associated Press and SEC coaches.

=== 2025 ===
Before the 2025 season, Woodring was named to the preseason second-team All-American teams by the Associated Press and CBS Sports, along with being named the preseason first-team All-SEC kicker. In addition, Woodring was named on the Lou Groza Award watchlist. In week 3 against Tennessee, Woodring made 3 of 3 field goals, including a 48-yard attempt, and was named SEC Special Teams Player of the Week as a result. Against Auburn, Woodring made 2 of 3 field goals, including a season-high 53-yard attempt. The following week against Ole Miss, Woodring hit 3 of 3 field goals, including a 51-yard attempt. In week 11, Woodring was again named SEC Special Teams Player of the Week for making 2 of 2 field goals, one from 46 and the other from 49 yards, against Mississippi State. In week 14, Woodring made 3 of 3 field goals, including one from 50 yards, in a win against Georgia Tech. During the season, Woodring was named a semifinalist for the Lou Groza Award for the third consecutive year. For the second year in a row, Woodring was named to the All-SEC second-team by the Associated Press and SEC coaches. Overall in 2025, Woodring made 17 of his 19 field goal attempts and stayed perfect on extra points, going 54 of 54.

=== 2026 ===
Shortly after the 2025 season, Woodring announced he would return to Georgia for his senior season in 2026. Before the season, Woodring was named on the Lou Groza Award watchlist. In week 4 against Oklahoma, in addition to going 2 for 2 on field goals, Woodring converted his 201st consecutive extra point, breaking the previous record held by Rodrigo Blankenship for the most consecutive extra points made in both Georgia and SEC history. In week 12 against South Carolina, Woodring converted an extra point to pass Blankenship as Georgia’s all time leading points scorer.

=== College statistics ===
Season	Team	Conf	Class	Pos	GP	Kicking						
Season	Team	Conf	Class	Pos	GP	XPM	XPA	XP%	FGM	FGA	FG%	Pts
2023	Georgia	SEC	FR	PK	14	71	71	100.0	21	25	84.0	134
2024	Georgia	SEC	SO	PK	14	48	48	100.0	21	23	91.3	111
2025	Georgia	SEC	JR	PK	14	54	54	100.0	17	19	89.5	105
2026	Georgia	SEC	SR	PK	11	57	57	100.0	13	17	76.5	96
Career					53	230	230	100.0	72	84	85.7	446
