= Pat Coffee =

American football player (1915–1986)

No. 20
- Positions: Halfback, tailback

Personal information
- Born: August 3, 1915; De Ann, Arkansas, U.S.
- Died: January 25, 1986 (aged 70); Baton Rouge, Louisiana, U.S.
- Listed height: 5 ft 11 in (1.80 m)
- Listed weight: 183 lb (83 kg)

Career information
- High school: Minden (Webster Parish, Louisiana)
- College: LSU

Career history
- Chicago Cardinals (1937–1938)
- Stats at Pro Football Reference

James Lilburn "Pat" Coffee (August 3, 1915 – January 25, 1986) was an American professional football player who was a halfback and tailback. He played in the National Football League (NFL) for the Chicago Cardinals in 1937 and 1938. He played college football for the LSU Tigers from 1933 to 1936.

== Early life ==
Coffee was born in 1915 in De Ann, Arkansas. He attended Minden High School in Minden, Louisiana. He was a star football player in high school who had a 68-yard punt in 1932. Known as a triple-threat man, Coffee was named to the All-Northern Louisiana football team in December 1932.

== LSU ==
Coffee enrolled at Louisiana State University (LSU) and played college football for the LSU Tigers from 1933 to 1936. He was a triple-threat player who excelled as a passer; he was also known as a hard-running back and a good punter and blocker.

== Professional football ==
In 1937, Coffee reported to the New York Giants of the National Football League (NFL). He left and returned to LSU to resume his studies. He was then summoned by the Chicago Cardinals in early October. He appeared in nine games for the Cardinals in 1937, completing 52 of 119 passes for 824 yards. He ranked second in the NFL in passing yards and third in completed passes. He also set an NFL record in 1937 with a 97-yard touchdown pass to receiver Gaynell Tinsley.

In 1938, Coffee returned to the Cardinals and appeared in 10 games, but only one as a starter. He tallied 200 passing yards and 169 rushing yards.

== Later life ==
Coffee returned to Minden, Louisiana, after the 1938 NFL season. In 1943, he obtained a degree in dentistry from Loyola University New Orleans.

Coffee died in January 1986 at age 70 in Baton Rouge, Louisiana.
