= 2022 Louisiana Ragin' Cajuns football team =

American college football season

2022 Louisiana Ragin' Cajuns football

Independence Bowl, L 16–23 vs. Houston
- Conference: Sun Belt Conference
- West Division
- Record: 6–7 (4–4 Sun Belt)
- Head coach: Michael Desormeaux (1st season)
- Associate head coach: Jorge Munoz (1st season)
- Offensive coordinator: Tim Leger (2nd season)
- Offensive scheme: Spread
- Defensive coordinator: LaMar Morgan (1st season)
- Base defense: 3–4
- Home stadium: Cajun Field

2022 Sun Belt Conference football standings
	Conf.			Overall
Team	W		L	W		L
East Division
James Madison* x	6	–	2	8	–	3
Coastal Carolina xy	6	–	2	9	–	4
Marshall	5	–	3	9	–	4
Georgia Southern	3	–	5	6	–	7
Appalachian State	3	–	5	6	–	6
Georgia State	3	–	5	4	–	8
Old Dominion	2	–	6	3	–	9
West Division
No. 19 Troy xy$	7	–	1	12	–	2
South Alabama x	7	–	1	10	–	3
Southern Miss	4	–	4	7	–	6
Louisiana	4	–	4	6	–	7
Louisiana–Monroe	3	–	5	4	–	8
Texas State	2	–	6	4	–	8
Arkansas State	1	–	7	3	–	9
Championship: Troy 45, Coastal Carolina 26
$ – Conference champion; x – Division champion/co-champions; y – Championship game participant; * – Ineligible for postseason play due to FCS-to-FBS transition rules; Rankings from AP Poll

The 2022 Louisiana Ragin' Cajuns football team represented the University of Louisiana at Lafayette in the 2022 NCAA Division I FBS football season. The Ragin' Cajuns played their home games at Cajun Field in Lafayette, Louisiana, and competed in the West Division of the Sun Belt Conference. They were led by first-year head coach Michael Desormeaux.

== Preseason ==
=== Recruiting class ===
College recruiting
Name	Hometown	School	Height	Weight	40^{‡}	Commit date
Terrance Carter; TE	Killeen, Texas	Harker Heights HS	6 ft 1 in (1.85 m)	249 lb (113 kg)	–	Dec 15, 2021
Terrance Carter; TE	Recruit ratings: Scout: Rivals: 247Sports: ESPN:					
Zeon Chriss; QB	Baton Rouge, Louisiana	Madison Prep Academy	6 ft 1 in (1.85 m)	198 lb (90 kg)	–	Dec 15, 2021
Zeon Chriss; QB	Recruit ratings: Scout: Rivals: 247Sports: ESPN:					
Lorenzell Dubose; CB	Monroe, Louisiana	Neville HS	5 ft 11 in (1.80 m)	178 lb (81 kg)	–	Dec 15, 2021
Lorenzell Dubose; CB	Recruit ratings: Scout: Rivals: 247Sports: ESPN:					
Kailep Edwards; LB	Wallace, Louisiana	West St. John HS	6 ft 0 in (1.83 m)	223 lb (101 kg)	–	Dec 15, 2021
Kailep Edwards; LB	Recruit ratings: Scout: Rivals: 247Sports: ESPN:					
Jaydon Johnson; WR	Missouri City, Texas	Thurgood Marshall HS	6 ft 1 in (1.85 m)	213 lb (97 kg)	–	Dec 15, 2021
Jaydon Johnson; WR	Recruit ratings: Scout: Rivals: 247Sports: ESPN:					
Kaden Moreau; OL	Pineville, Louisiana	Pineville HS	6 ft 3 in (1.91 m)	285 lb (129 kg)	–	Feb 2, 2022
Kaden Moreau; OL	Recruit ratings: Scout: Rivals: 247Sports: ESPN:					
Trent Murphy; OL	Opelousas, Louisiana	Opelousas HS	6 ft 2 in (1.88 m)	271 lb (123 kg)	–	Feb 2, 2022
Trent Murphy; OL	Recruit ratings: Scout: Rivals: 247Sports: ESPN:					
James Ohonba; OL	Stockbridge, Georgia	Woodland HS; Michigan State	6 ft 3 in (1.91 m)	318 lb (144 kg)	–	Feb 2, 2022
James Ohonba; OL	Recruit ratings: Scout: Rivals: 247Sports: ESPN:					
Zylan Perry; RB	Franklin, Louisiana	Franklin HS	5 ft 9 in (1.75 m)	187 lb (85 kg)	–	Feb 2, 2022
Zylan Perry; RB	Recruit ratings: Scout: Rivals: 247Sports: ESPN:					
Charles Robertson; WR	Zachary, Louisiana	Zachary HS	6 ft 0 in (1.83 m)	186 lb (84 kg)	–	Feb 2, 2022
Charles Robertson; WR	Recruit ratings: Scout: Rivals: 247Sports: ESPN:					
Bryant Williams; OL	Lake Charles, Louisiana	Grand Lake HS	6 ft 7 in (2.01 m)	323 lb (147 kg)	–	Dec 15, 2021
Bryant Williams; OL	Recruit ratings: Scout: Rivals: 247Sports: ESPN:					
Marcus Wiser; DL	Corpus Christi, Texas	Calallen HS; Kilgore College	6 ft 1 in (1.85 m)	290 lb (130 kg)	–	Dec 15, 2021
Marcus Wiser; DL	Recruit ratings: Scout: Rivals: 247Sports: ESPN:					
Damon Youngblood; S	McKinney, Texas	McKinney HS	5 ft 9 in (1.75 m)	181 lb (82 kg)	–	Dec 15, 2021
Damon Youngblood; S	Recruit ratings: Scout: Rivals: 247Sports: ESPN:					

=== Award watch lists ===
Listed in the order that they were released

==== Preseason ====
Award	Player	Position	Year	Reference
Doak Walker Award	Chris Smith	RB	RS-JR	
John Mackey Award	Johnny Lumpkin	TE	RS-SR	
Outland Trophy	AJ Gillie	OG	RS-SO	
Ray Guy Award	Rhys Byrns	P	SR	
Wuerffel Trophy	Chris Smith	RB	RS-JR	
Reese's Senior Bowl	Chris Smith	RB	RS-JR	
Reese's Senior Bowl	Andre Jones Jr.	OLB	RS-SR	
Reese's Senior Bowl	Michael Jefferson	WR	SR	

=== Sun Belt coaches poll ===
The Sun Belt coaches poll was released on July 25, 2022. The Cajuns were picked to finish first in the West Division and first in the conference.

=== Sun Belt Preseason All-Conference teams ===
Defense

1st team

- Zi'Yon Hill-Green – Defensive line, RS-SR
- Eric Garror – Defensive back, SR

2nd team

- Andre Jones Jr. – Linebacker, RS-SR

Special teams

1st team

- Rhys Byrns – Punter, SR
- Chris Smith – All-Purpose, RS-JR

== Personnel ==
2022 Louisiana Ragin' Cajuns football team roster
Players
Coaches
Offense

Pos.	#	Name	Class
RB	0	Jacob Kibodi	Jr
QB	2	Zeon Chriss	Fr
WR	3	Golden Eke	Jr
WR	4	Jacob Bernard	So
WR	6	Errol Rogers Jr.	So
WR	7	John Stephens Jr.	Sr
WR	8	Michael Jefferson	Sr
QB	8	Zy McDonald	Fr
TE	9	Neal Johnson	Jr
QB	9	Lance Legendre	So
QB	10	Ben Wooldridge	Jr
WR	11	Dalen Cambre	So
RB	13	Chris Smith	Jr
QB	15	Hunter Herring	Fr
WR	16	Kaleb Carter	Jr
WR	17	Dontae Fleming	So
QB	18	Chandler Fields	So
WR	19	Jamal Bell	Sr
WR	19	Dale Martin	Fr
RB	20	Dre'Lyn Washington	Fr
RB	21	Zylan Perry	Fr
RB	23	Terrence Williams	So
TE	24	Pearse Migl	Jr
RB	27	Kendrell Williams	Fr
WR	29	Peter LeBlanc	Jr
WR	30	Treyv'on Culbert	Fr
WR	31	Jared Braxton	Fr
RB	35	Chaz Ward	Jr
WR	37	Aaron Edwards	So
WR	38	Charlie Wells	Fr
TE	41	Joe Lombardi Jr.	Fr
RB	44	Taelon Nicholas	Fr
OL	50	Nate Thomas	So
OL	51	James Ohonba	Jr
OL	53	AJ Gillie	So
OL	55	Landon Burton	So
OL	60	Zach Boulet	Fr
OL	61	Nathaniel LaRue	Fr
OL	62	Camden Maroon	Fr
OL	63	Brodie Reich	Fr
OL	64	Bryant Williams	Fr
OL	65	Carlos Rubio	Jr
OL	66	Trent Murphy	Fr
OL	68	Nick Doré	Fr
OL	69	Jared Kreeger	So
OL	70	Jax Harrington	Fr
OL	71	George Jackson	Fr
OL	73	David Hudson	Sr
OL	74	Colby Hebert	So
OL	75	Kaden Moreau	Fr
OL	77	King McGowen	So
OL	78	Quinton Williams	So
OL	79	Mackey Maillho	Fr
WR	80	Charles Robertson	Fr
WR	81	Jaydon Johnson	Fr
TE	82	Rhett Guidry	Fr
TE	83	Damani Burrell	Jr
TE	84	Jathan Caldwell	Fr
WR	85	Robert Williams	Fr
TE	86	Terrance Carter	Fr
TE	87	Tyler Hatcher	So
TE	88	Johnny Lumpkin	Sr
WR	89	Calvin Bullock	Fr

Defense

Pos.	#	Name	Class
S	0	Kam Pedescleaux	Jr
S	2	Brandon Bishop	Jr
S	3	Tyrone Lewis Jr.	So
DL	4	Zi'Yon Hill-Green	Sr
LB	6	Kris Moncrief	Sr
CB	7	Eric Garror	Sr
DL	8	Kendall Wilkerson	So
LB	10	Andre Jones Jr.	Sr
CB	11	Caleb Anderson	Fr
CB	13	Amir McDaniel	So
LB	15	Ja'Marian Peterson	Fr
CB	16	AJ Washington	Sr
LB	17	Cameron George	Fr
LB	18	Jasper Williams	Jr
LB	19	AJ Riley	Jr
CB	20	Jalen Clark	Fr
CB	21	Trey Amos	So
S	22	Patrick Mensah	Jr
S	23	Courtline Flowers	So
S	24	Bralen Trahan	Sr
LB	25	Kendre' Gant	So
CB	26	Justin Agu	Fr
CB	27	Key'Savalyn Barnes	Fr
CB	28	Keyon Martin	So
LB	29	K. C. Ossai	So
S	30	Cejae Ceasar	Fr
S	31	Tyree Skipper	Fr
LB	33	Tyler Guidry	Jr
CB	33	Collin Jacob	Fr
LB	34	Kailep Edwards	Fr
CB	34	Calep Jacob	Fr
S	35	Lanard Harris	Fr
CB	36	Lorenzell Dubose	Fr
LB	38	Cameron Whitfield	Fr
CB	39	Denim Day	Fr
S	41	Ty'Darien Quinney	So
LB	43	Jourdon Quibodeaux	Sr
S	43	Aaron Wright	Fr
LB	44	Jake St. Andre	Fr
LB	45	Caleb Kibodi	Fr
DL	46	Jordan Lawson	Fr
S	48	Maurion Eleam	Fr
DL	49	Jeremiah Williams	Fr
LB	50	Ross Cheatham	Sr
DL	52	Demetrus Gladney	Fr
DL	53	Christopher Scott	Fr
LB	54	Jake Chiasson	Fr
DL	56	Joshua Robinson	Fr
LB	57	Hunter Warren	Fr
LB	58	Colbi Dennis	Fr
LB	59	Wesley Maze	Fr
LB	80	Alex Self	So
S	81	Kerry Wilson	Fr
S	82	Larry Reimonenq	Fr
CB	83	Willie Smith	Fr
DL	90	Mason Narcisse	So
DL	91	Sonny Hazard	So
DL	92	Damon Thompson	Fr
DL	93	Nijel McGriff	So
DL	94	Dalvin Hutchinson	Jr
DL	95	Blake Champagne	Fr
DL	96	RJ Oliver	Fr
DL	97	Ja-Quane Nelson	Sr
DL	98	Andre Landry	Sr
DL	99	Marcus Wiser	So

Special teams

Pos.	#	Name	Class
K	36	Gavin Royer	Fr
K	37	Preston Stafford	Jr
LS	39	Carter Milliron	Fr
K	40	Logan Klotz	Fr
LS	40	Hunter Sims	Fr
K	45	Kenneth Almendares	So
P	47	Rhys Byrns	Sr
K	51	Evan Padilla	Sr
LS	52	James Segrest	So
P	84	Thomas Leo	Jr

Head coach

- Michael Desormeaux (Louisiana)

Coordinators/assistant coaches

- LaMar Morgan (Louisiana)
  Defensive coordinator/S
- Tim Leger (McNeese State)
  Offensive coordinator/recruiting coordinator/WR
- Luke Paschall (Middle Tennessee)
  Special teams coordinator/director of quality control
- Jorge Munoz (Bethany)
  Associate head coach/TE
- Matt Bergeron (Lamar)
  Running backs
- Jeff Burris (Notre Dame)
  Cornerbacks
- Mike Giuliani (SUNY Cortland)
  Outside linebackers
- Jeff Norrid (Arkansas)
  Offensive linemen
- Bryant Ross (Alabama A&M)
  Assistant OL
- Galen Scott (Illinois State)
  Inside linebackers
- Dennis Thomas (South Carolina)
  Defensive linemen

Legend

- (C) Team captain
- (S) Suspended
- (I) Ineligible
- Injured
- Redshirt

Roster
Last update: 5 September 2022

== Schedule ==
All conference games were announced in early March 2022.

Date	Time	Opponent	Site	TV	Result	Attendance
September 3	6:00 p.m.	No. 17 (FCS) Southeastern Louisiana*	Cajun Field; Lafayette, Louisiana (Cypress Mug)	ESPN3	W 24–7	16,812
September 10	6:00 p.m.	Eastern Michigan*	Cajun Field; Lafayette, Louisiana	NFLN	W 49–21	18,079
September 17	6:30 p.m.	at Rice*	Rice Stadium; Houston, Texas	ESPN+	L 21–33	18,746
September 24	7:00 p.m.	at Louisiana–Monroe	Malone Stadium; Monroe, Louisiana (Battle on the Bayou)	ESPN+	L 17–21	19,077
October 1	4:00 p.m.	South Alabama^{†}	Cajun Field; Lafayette, Louisiana	ESPN+	L 17–20	20,671
October 12	6:30 p.m.	at Marshall	Joan C. Edwards Stadium; Huntington, West Virginia	ESPN2	W 23–13	19,905
October 22	4:00 p.m.	Arkansas State	Cajun Field; Lafayette, Louisiana	ESPN+	W 38–18	15,017
October 27	6:30 p.m.	at Southern Miss	M. M. Roberts Stadium; Hattiesburg, Mississippi	ESPN2	L 24–39	27,332
November 5	4:00 p.m.	Troy	Cajun Field; Lafayette, Louisiana	ESPN+	L 17–23	7,888
November 10	6:30 p.m.	Georgia Southern	Cajun Field; Lafayette, Louisiana	ESPN2	W 36–17	11,512
November 19	11:00 a.m.	at No. 19 Florida State*	Doak Campbell Stadium; Tallahassee, Florida	ACCRSN	L 17–49	58,597
November 26	4:00 p.m.	at Texas State	Bobcat Stadium; San Marcos, Texas	ESPN+	W 41–13	15,035
December 23	2:00 p.m.	vs. Houston*	Independence Stadium; Shreveport, Louisiana (Independence Bowl)	ESPN	L 16–23	23,410
*Non-conference game; ^{†}Homecoming; Rankings from Coaches' Poll released prior to the game

== Game summaries ==
=== Southeastern Louisiana ===
Southeastern Louisiana at Louisiana

Team	1	2	3	4	Total
No. 17 (FCS) Lions	0	0	7	0	7
• Ragin' Cajuns	10	7	0	7	24

- Date: September 3, 2022
- Location: Cajun Field
  Lafayette, Louisiana
- Game start: 6:03 p.m. CDT
- Elapsed time: 3 hours and 13 minutes
- Game attendance: 16,812
- Game weather: 75 °F (24 °C) • Weather: Cloudy • Wind: SW 4 MPH
- Referee: Scott Broadway
- TV announcers (ESPN+): Dan McDonald (play-by-play) and Eric Mouton (analyst)

Scoring summary
1	09:08	LA	Johnny Lumpkin 28-yard pass from Chandler Fields (Preston Stafford kick) (9 plays, 79 yards, 4:20)	LA 7–0
1	01:34	LA	Preston Stafford 36-yard field goal (14 plays, 58 yards, 5:54)	LA 10–0
2	12:41	LA	Eric Garror 83-yard punt returned (Preston Stafford kick) (0 plays, 0 yards, 0:00)	LA 17–0
3	04:04	SELA	Carlos Washington, Jr. 5-yard rush (Mateo Rengifo kick) (13 plays, 78 yards, 5:56)	LA 17–7
4	01:37	LA	Johnny Lumpkin 3-yard pass from Chandler Fields (Preston Stafford kick) (7 plays, 39 yards, 3:09)	LA 24–7

Statistics	Southeastern Louisiana	Louisiana
First downs	12	18
Total yards	260	374
Rushing yards	111	133
Passing yards	149	241
Turnovers	2	0
Time of possession	29:04	30:56

Team	Category	Player	Statistics
Southeastern Louisiana	Passing	Cephus Johnson III	22/34, 149 yards, 1 INT
Southeastern Louisiana	Rushing	Carlos Washington Jr.	10 carries, 57 yards, 1 TD
Southeastern Louisiana	Receiving	CJ Turner	3 receptions, 46 yards
Louisiana	Passing	Chandler Fields	13/20, 173 yards, 2 TDs
Louisiana	Rushing	Terrence Williams	10 carries, 61 yards
Louisiana	Receiving	Johnny Lumpkin	5 receptions, 72 yards, 2 TDs

=== Eastern Michigan ===
Eastern Michigan at Louisiana

Team	1	2	3	4	Total
Eagles	7	7	7	0	21
• Ragin' Cajuns	0	0	21	28	49

- Date: September 10, 2022
- Location: Cajun Field
  Lafayette, Louisiana
- Game start: 6:04 p.m. CDT
- Elapsed time: 4 hours and 30 minutes
- Game attendance: 18,079
- Game weather: 86 °F (30 °C) • Weather: Mostly cloudy • Wind: S 4 MPH
- Referee: Greg Sujack
- TV announcers (NFL Network): Doug Sherman (play–by–play) and Tyoka Jackson (analyst)

Scoring summary
1	08:29	EMU	Aaron Jackson 3-yard pass from Samson Evans (Jesús Gómez kick) (13 plays, 75 yards, 6:31)	EMU 7–0
2	00:05	EMU	Tanner Knue 25-yard pass from Taylor Powell (Jesús Gómez kick) (11 plays, 88 yards, 3:26)	EMU 14–0
3	12:41	LA	Michael Jefferson 27-yard pass from Chandler Fields (Preston Stafford kick) (2 plays, 27 yards, 0:11)	EMU 14–7
3	09:14	LA	Johnny Lumpkin 1-yard pass from Chandler Fields (Preston Stafford kick) (7 plays, 32 yards, 3:09)	TIE 14–14
3	07:00	EMU	Darius Boone 1-yard rush (Jesús Gómez kick) (5 plays, 82 yards, 2:08)	EMU 21–14
3	03:59	LA	John Stephens Jr. 36-yard pass from Ben Woolridge (Preston Stafford kick) (7 plays, 75 yards, 3:01)	TIE 21–21
4	14:52	LA	Chris Smith 20-yard rush (Kam Pedescleaux kick) (6 plays, 61 yards, 2:25)	LA 28–21
4	11:15	LA	Neal Johnson 19-yard pass from Chandler Fields (Preston Stafford kick) (7 plays, 43 yards, 3:18)	LA 35–21
4	08:22	LA	Pearse Migl 2-yard pass from Ben Woolridge (Preston Stafford kick) (5 plays, 71 yards, 2:21)	LA 42–21
4	01:47	LA	Dre'lyn Washington 1-yard rush (Ben Woolridge kick) (8 plays, 55 yards, 4:34)	LA 49–21

Statistics	Eastern Michigan	Louisiana
First downs	23	23
Total yards	361	459
Rushing yards	41	149
Passing yards	320	310
Turnovers	5	0
Time of possession	29:35	30:25

Team	Category	Player	Statistics
Eastern Michigan	Passing	Taylor Powell	31/50, 317 yards, 1 TD, 3 INTs
Eastern Michigan	Rushing	Jaylon Jackson	5 carries, 37 yards
Eastern Michigan	Receiving	Tanner Knue	8 receptions, 89 yards, 1 TD
Louisiana	Passing	Ben Wooldridge	12/13, 169 yards, 2 TDs
Louisiana	Rushing	Dre'lyn Washington	8 carries, 45 yards, 1 TD
Louisiana	Receiving	John Stephens Jr.	3 receptions, 103 yards, 1 TD

=== At Rice ===
Louisiana at Rice

Team	1	2	3	4	Total
Ragin' Cajuns	7	7	0	7	21
• Owls	3	10	6	14	33

- Date: September 17, 2022
- Location: Rice Stadium
  Houston, Texas
- Game start: 6:32 p.m. CDT
- Elapsed time: 3 hours and 39 minutes
- Game attendance: 18,764
- Game weather: 87 °F (31 °C) • Weather: Sunny • Wind: SE 10 MPH
- Referee: Scott Hardin
- TV announcers (ESPN+): David Saltzman (play–by–play) & Chris Mycoskie (analyst)

Scoring summary
1	07:17	RICE	Christian VanSickle 23-yard field goal (7 plays, 33 yards, 2:42)	RICE 3–0
1	02:47	LA	Caleb Anderson 54-yard interception returned (Preston Stafford kick) (5 plays, 64 yards, 2:45)	LA 7–3
2	05:20	RICE	Luke McCaffrey 8-yard pass from TJ McMahon (Christian VanSickle kick) (13 plays, 83 yards, 7:56)	RICE 10–7
2	01:24	LA	Terrence Williams 11-yard pass from Chandler Fields (Preston Stafford kick) (3 plays, 17 yards, 1:28)	LA 14–10
2	00:01	RICE	Christian VanSickle 31-yard field goal (9 plays, 60 yards, 1:19)	LA 14–13
3	10:20	RICE	Bradley Rozner 12-yard pass from TJ McMahon (two-point pass conversion attempt failed) (11 plays, 75 yards, 4:40)	RICE 19–14
4	11:25	RICE	Luke McCaffrey 6-yard pass from TJ McMahon (TJ McMahon two-point conversion pass to Bradley Rozner) (10 plays, 65 yards, 6:07)	RICE 27–14
4	09:17	LA	Chris Smith 22-yard rush (Preston Stafford kick) (7 plays, 75 yards, 2:08)	RICE 27–21
4	02:59	RICE	Ari Broussard 2-yard rush (two-point pass conversion pass attempt failed) (11 plays, 70 yards, 6:14)	RICE 33–21

Statistics	Louisiana	Rice
First downs	9	26
Total yards	175	449
Rushing yards	61	146
Passing yards	114	303
Turnovers	1	3
Time of possession	18:09	41:51

Team	Category	Player	Statistics
Louisiana	Passing	Ben Wooldridge	6/14, 76 yards
Louisiana	Rushing	Chris Smith	6 carries, 39 yards, 1 TD
Louisiana	Receiving	Michael Jefferson	5 receptions, 53 yards
Rice	Passing	TJ McMahon	25/36, 303 yards, 3 TDs, 3 INTs
Rice	Rushing	Ari Broussard	19 carries, 49 yards, 1 TD
Rice	Receiving	Luke McCaffrey	10 receptions, 105 yards, 2 TDs

=== At Louisiana–Monroe ===
Louisiana at Louisiana–Monroe

Team	1	2	3	4	Total
Ragin' Cajuns	14	3	0	0	17
• Warhawks	7	0	0	14	21

- Date: September 24, 2022
- Location: Malone Stadium
  Monroe, Louisiana
- Game start: 7:02 p.m. CDT
- Elapsed time: 3 hours and 22 minutes
- Game attendance: 19,077
- Game weather: 91 °F (33 °C) • Weather: Sunny • Wind: SW 7 MPH
- Referee: Jeremy Parker
- TV announcers (ESPN+): Nick White (play–by–play) and Desmond Lighten (analyst)

Scoring summary
1	07:56	LA	Chandler Fields 9-yard rush (Preston Stafford kick) (6 plays, 76 yards, 2:18)	LA 7–0
1	07:02	ULM	Andrew Henry 75-yard rush (Calum Sutherland kick) (2 plays, 79 yards, 0:47)	TIE 7–7
1	05:11	LA	Michael Jefferson 50-yard pass from Chandler Fields (Preston Stafford kick) (4 plays, 60 yards, 1:51)	LA 14–7
2	07:25	LA	Preston Stafford 28-yard field goal (4 plays, 9 yards, 2:15)	LA 17–7
3	11:07	ULM	Chandler Rogers 5-yard rush (Calum Sutherland kick) (2 plays, 8 yards, 0:39)	LA 17–14
3	06:51	ULM	Malik Jackson 2-yard rush (Calum Sutherland kick) (3 plays, 90 yards, 1:20)	ULM 21–17

Statistics	Louisiana	Louisiana–Monroe
First downs	18	15
Total yards	354	419
Rushing yards	86	227
Passing yards	268	192
Turnovers	2	2
Time of possession	32:45	27:15

Team	Category	Player	Statistics
Louisiana	Passing	Chandler Fields	20/34, 231 yards, 1 TD, 1 INT
Louisiana	Rushing	Chris Smith	10 carries, 41 yards
Louisiana	Receiving	Michael Jefferson	5 receptions, 105 yards, 1 TD
Louisiana–Monroe	Passing	Chandler Rogers	14/26, 192 yards, 1 INT
Louisiana–Monroe	Rushing	Andrew Henry	11 carries, 123 yards, 1 TD
Louisiana–Monroe	Receiving	Tyrone Howell	3 receptions, 124 yards

=== South Alabama ===
South Alabama at Louisiana

Team	1	2	3	4	Total
• Jaguars	0	7	3	10	20
Ragin' Cajuns	7	0	0	10	17

- Date: October 1, 2022
- Location: Cajun Field
  Lafayette, Louisiana
- Game start: 4:02 p.m. CDT
- Elapsed time: 3 hours and 34 minutes
- Game attendance: 20,671
- Game weather: 84 °F (29 °C) • Weather: Sunny • Wind: N 11 MPH
- Referee: Wayne Winkler
- TV announcers (ESPN+): Dan McDonald (play-by-play) and Eric Mouton (analyst)

Scoring summary
1	07:53	LA	Eric Garror 69-yard punt returned (Kenneth Almendares kick) (3 plays, 6 yards, 1:22)	LA 7–0
2	02:54	USA	La'Damian Webb 1-yard rush (Diego Guajardo kick) (11 plays, 68 yards, 4:46)	TIE 7–7
3	08:29	USA	Diego Guajardo 38-yard field goal (7 plays, 44 yards, 2:52)	USA 10–7
4	12:53	USA	Carter Bradley 3-yard rush (Diego Guajardo kick) (11 plays, 51 yards, 4:46)	LA 17–7
4	07:43	LA	Kenneth Almendares 51-yard field goal (12 plays, 41 yards, 5:10)	USA 17–10
4	00:42	LA	Pearse Migl 81-yard pass from Ben Wooldridge (Kenneth Almendares kick) (17 plays, 82 yards, 6:17)	TIE 17–17
4	00:00	USA	Diego Guajardo 43-yard field goal (8 plays, 49 yards, 0:42)	USA 20–17

Statistics	South Alabama	Louisiana
First downs	20	17
Total yards	361	274
Rushing yards	116	159
Passing yards	245	115
Turnovers	2	3
Time of possession	30:18	29:42

Team	Category	Player	Statistics
South Alabama	Passing	Carter Bradley	18/41, 245 yards, 1 INT
South Alabama	Rushing	La'Damian Webb	22 carries, 75 yards, 1 TD
South Alabama	Receiving	Caullin Lacy	5 receptions, 112 yards
Louisiana	Passing	Ben Wooldridge	18/29, 90 yards, 1 TD, INT
Louisiana	Rushing	Chris Smith	12 carries, 107 yards
Louisiana	Receiving	Peter LeBlanc	3 receptions, 23 yards

=== At Marshall ===
Louisiana at Marshall

Team	1	2	3	4	Total
• Ragin' Cajuns	3	0	13	7	23
Thundering Herd	0	7	0	6	13

- Date: October 12, 2022
- Location: Joan C. Edwards Stadium
  Huntington, West Virginia
- Game start: 6:35 p.m. CDT
- Elapsed time: 3 hours and 48 minutes
- Game attendance: 19,905
- Game weather: Sunny
- Referee: Marshall Lewis
- TV announcers (ESPN2): Mike Morgan (play–by–play) and Aaron Murray (analyst)

Scoring summary
1	02:47	LA	Kenneth Almendares 42-yard field goal (8 plays, 55 yards, 2:38)	LA 3–0
2	04:09	MRSH	Khalan Laborn 1-yard rush (Rece Verhoff kick) (10 plays, 87 yards, 5:26)	MRSH 7–3
3	10:30	LA	Dontae Fleming 6-yard pass from Ben Wooldridge (Kenneth Almendares kick) (7 plays, 60 yards, 2:40)	LA 10–7
3	04:44	LA	Kenneth Almendares 33-yard field goal (8 plays, 61 yards, 3:06)	LA 13–7
3	00:00	LA	Kenneth Almendares 52-yard field goal (6 plays, 14 yards, 2:11)	LA 16–7
4	09:59	LA	Michael Jefferson 32-yard pass from Ben Wooldridge (Kenneth Almendares kick) (7 plays, 66 yards, 2:30)	LA 23–7
4	06:52	MRSH	Khalan Laborn 1-yard rush (Two-Point conversion rush attempt failed) (9 plays, 75 yards, 3:07)	LA 23–13

Statistics	Louisiana	Marshall
First downs	16	17
Total yards	338	276
Rushing yards	108	139
Passing yards	230	137
Turnovers	0	2
Time of possession	28:18	31:42

Team	Category	Player	Statistics
Louisiana	Passing	Ben Wooldridge	17/30, 230 yards, 2 TD
Louisiana	Rushing	Ben Wooldridge	10 carries, 45 yards
Louisiana	Receiving	Michael Jefferson	3 receptions, 71 yards, 1 TD
Marshall	Passing	Cam Fancher	7/9, 69 yards
Marshall	Rushing	Khalan Laborn	26 carries, 120 yards, 2 TD
Marshall	Receiving	Corey Gammage	4 receptions, 58 yards

=== Arkansas State ===
Arkansas State at Louisiana

Team	1	2	3	4	Total
Red Wolves	0	9	3	6	18
• Ragin' Cajuns	10	14	14	0	38

- Date: October 22, 2022
- Location: Cajun Field
  Lafayette, Louisiana
- Game start: 4:03 p.m. CDT
- Elapsed time: 3 hours and 31 minutes
- Game attendance: 15,017
- Game weather: 80 °F (27 °C) • Weather: Sunny • Wind: S 14 MPH
- Referee: Jeremy Parker
- TV announcers (ESPN+): Dan McDonald (play–by–play) and Eric Mouton (analyst)

Scoring summary
1	04:50	LA	Kenneth Almendares 43-yard field goal (12 plays, 49 yards, 4:05)	LA 3–0
1	00:13	LA	Dontae Fleming 7-yard pass from Ben Wooldridge (Kenneth Almendares kick) (9 plays, 53 yards, 3:49)	LA 10–0
2	08:58	ARST	Dominic Zvada 43-yard field goal (5 plays, 35 yards, 1:25)	LA 10–3
2	06:28	ARST	Seydou Traore 27-yard pass from AJ Mayer (Dominic Zvada PAT blocked) (3 plays, 85 yards, 1:11)	LA 10–9
2	04:36	LA	Jacob Bernard 45-yard pass from Ben Wooldridge (Kenneth Almendares kick) (7 plays, 75 yards, 1:52)	LA 17–9
2	01:14	LA	Dontae Fleming 55-yard pass from Ben Wooldridge (Kenneth Almendares kick) (4 plays, 86 yards, 1:26)	LA 24–9
3	11:34	LA	Michael Jefferson 36-yard pass from Ben Wooldridge (Kenneth Almendares kick) (9 plays, 75 yards, 3:26)	LA 31–9
3	06:57	LA	Neal Anderson 13-yard pass from Ben Wooldridge (Kenneth Almendares kick) (7 plays, 49 yards, 3:39)	LA 38–9
3	01:59	ARST	Dominic Zvada 33-yard field goal (11 plays, 61 yards, 4:52)	LA 38–12
4	02:02	ARST	Dane Motley 12-yard fumble returned (Two-Point conversion attempt failed) (3 plays, -8 yards, 1:31)	LA 38–18

Statistics	Arkansas State	Louisiana
First downs	13	27
Total yards	271	522
Rushing yards	82	206
Passing yards	189	316
Turnovers	1	2
Time of possession	22:12	37:48

Team	Category	Player	Statistics
Arkansas State	Passing	AJ Mayer	8/23, 155 yards, 1 TD, 1 INT
Arkansas State	Rushing	Ja'Quez Cross	6 carries, 33 yards
Arkansas State	Receiving	Daverrick Jenkins	3 receptions, 61 yards
Louisiana	Passing	Ben Wooldridge	21/34, 316 yards, 5 TD
Louisiana	Rushing	Terrence Williams	11 carries, 58 yards
Louisiana	Receiving	Jacob Bernard	5 receptions, 97 yards, 1 TD

=== At Southern Miss ===
Louisiana at Southern Mississippi

Team	1	2	3	4	Total
Ragin' Cajuns	5	6	6	7	24
• Golden Eagles	20	9	0	10	39

- Date: October 27, 2022
- Location: M. M. Roberts Stadium
  Hattiesburg, Mississippi
- Game start: 6:35 p.m. CDT
- Elapsed time: 3 hours and 46 minutes
- Game attendance: 27,332
- Game weather: 68 °F (20 °C) • Weather: Sunny • Wind: NE 4 MPH
- Referee: Wayne Winkler
- TV announcers (ESPN2): Mike Couzens (play–by–play) and Charles Arbuckle (analyst)

Scoring summary
1	07:29	USM	Janari Dean 1-yard rush (Briggs Bourgeois PAT blocked) (5 plays, 19 yards, 2:29)	USM 6–0
1	07:28	LA	Trey Amos Defensive PAT conversion (0 plays, 0 yards, 0:00)	USM 6–2
1	04:34	USM	Tiaquelin Mims 52-yard pass from Frank Gore, Jr. (Briggs Bourgeois kick) (3 plays, 59 yards, 1:44)	USM 13–2
1	02:36	USM	Jason Brownlee 76-yard pass from Zach Wilcke (Briggs Bourgeois kick) (1 play, 76 yards, 0:12)	USM 20–2
1	00:00	LA	Kenneth Almendares 50-yard field goal (9 plays, 42 yards, 2:36)	USM 20–5
2	10:21	USM	Camron Harrell safety (2 plays, -1 yards, 0:45)	USM 22–5
2	05:29	USM	Jason Brownlee 12-yard pass from Frank Gore, Jr. (Briggs Bourgeois kick) (11 plays, 69 yards, 4:43)	USM 29–5
2	03:39	LA	Michael Jefferson 63-yard pass from Ben Wooldridge (Kenneth Almendares PAT blocked) (5 plays, 75 yards, 1:50)	USM 29–11
3	02:34	LA	John Stephens Jr. 9-yard pass from Ben Wooldridge (Two-Point pass conversion attempt failed) (6 plays, 85 yards, 2:14)	USM 29–17
4	10:30	USM	Briggs Bourgeois 25-yard field goal (8 plays, 28 yards, 4:03)	USM 32–17
4	03:12	LA	Terrence Williams 1-yard rush (Kenneth Almendares kick) (3 plays, 7 yards, 0:51)	USM 32–24
4	01:14	USM	Natrone Brooks 52-yard interception returned (Briggs Bourgeois kick) (5 plays, 16 yards, 0:51)	USM 39–24

Statistics	Louisiana	Southern Miss
First downs	17	15
Total yards	439	339
Rushing yards	103	150
Passing yards	336	189
Turnovers	4	2
Time of possession	26:47	33:13

Team	Category	Player	Statistics
Louisiana	Passing	Ben Wooldridge	21/46, 336 yards, 2 TD, 3 INT
Louisiana	Rushing	Chris Smith	11 carries, 47 yards
Louisiana	Receiving	Michael Jefferson	6 receptions, 179 yards, 1 TD
Southern Miss	Passing	Zach Wilcke	8/17, 137 yards, 2 TD, 1 INT
Southern Miss	Rushing	Frank Gore Jr.	23 carries, 87 yards
Southern Miss	Receiving	Jason Brownlee	3 receptions, 102 yards, 2 TD

=== Troy ===
Troy at Louisiana

Team	1	2	3	4	Total
• Trojans	0	0	7	16	23
Ragin' Cajuns	0	10	7	0	17

- Date: November 5, 2022
- Location: Cajun Field
  Lafayette, Louisiana
- Game start: 4:02 p.m. CDT
- Elapsed time: 3 hours and 18 minutes
- Game attendance: 7,888
- Game weather: 69 °F (21 °C) • Weather: Sunny • Wind: NE 8 MPH
- Referee: Javarro Edwards
- TV announcers (ESPN+): Dan McDonald (play–by–play) and Eric Mouton (analyst)

Scoring summary
2	05:39	LA	Ben Wooldridge 11-yard rush (Kenneth Almendares kick) (13 plays, 80 yards, 5:38)	LA 7–0
2	01:27	LA	Kenneth Almendares 30-yard field goal (9 plays, 36 yards, 3:27)	LA 10–0
3	08:36	LA	Ben Wooldridge 10-yard rush (Kenneth Almendares kick) (12 plays, 77 yards, 6:15)	LA 17–0
3	00:00	TROY	Michael Vice 3-yard pass from Gunnar Watson (Brooks Buce kick) (20 plays, 75 yards, 8:36)	LA 17–7
4	12:01	TROY	Deyunkrea Lewis 35-yard pass from Gunnar Watson (Brooks Buce kick) (6 plays, 67 yards, 1:57)	LA 17–14
4	02:41	TROY	Brooks Buce 37-yard field goal (6 plays, 54 yards, 2:32)	TIE 17–17
4	00:05	TROY	Kimani Vidal 22-yard rush (Brooks Buce PAT blocked) (8 plays, 68 yards, 1:12)	TROY 23–17

Statistics	Troy	Louisiana
First downs	21	21
Total yards	377	315
Rushing yards	154	203
Passing yards	223	112
Turnovers	1	0
Time of possession	30:08	29:52

Team	Category	Player	Statistics
Troy	Passing	Gunnar Watson	21/35, 223 yards, 2 TD, 1 INT
Troy	Rushing	Kimani Vidal	21 carries, 117 yards, 1 TD
Troy	Receiving	RaJae' Johnson	5 receptions, 79 yards
Louisiana	Passing	Ben Wooldridge	13/29, 112 yards
Louisiana	Rushing	Chris Smith	18 carries, 97 yards
Louisiana	Receiving	Michael Jefferson	6 receptions, 50 yards

=== Georgia Southern ===
Georgia Southern at Louisiana

Team	1	2	3	4	Total
Eagles	0	7	7	3	17
• Ragin' Cajuns	7	20	3	6	36

- Date: November 10, 2022
- Location: Cajun Field
  Lafayette, Louisiana
- Game start: 6:33 p.m. CDT
- Elapsed time: 3 hours and 32 minutes
- Game attendance: 11,512
- Game weather: 65 °F (18 °C) • Weather: Clear • Wind: NE 3 MPH
- Referee: Ted Pitts
- TV announcers (ESPN2): Mike Couzens (play–by–play) and Charles Arbuckle (analyst)

Scoring summary
1	10:52	LA	John Stephens Jr. 28-yard pass from Ben Wooldridge (Kenneth Almendares kick) (6 plays, 60 yards, 2:43)	LA 7–0
2	13:43	GASO	Derwin Burgess Jr. 32-yard pass from OJ Arnold (Alex Raynor kick) (8 plays, 96 yards, 3:32)	TIE 7–7
2	12:28	LA	Jacob Bernard 18-yard pass from Ben Wooldridge (Kenneth Almendares kick) (3 plays, 75 yards, 1:15)	LA 14–7
2	10:45	LA	Michael Jefferson 28-yard pass from Ben Wooldridge (Kenneth Almendares kick) (1 play, 28 yards, 0:09)	LA 21–7
2	03:34	LA	Kenneth Almendares 48-yard field goal (11 plays, 40 yards, 4:48)	LA 24–7
2	00:00	LA	Kenneth Almendares 34-yard field goal (7 plays, 33 yards, 0:33)	LA 27–7
3	10:01	LA	Kenneth Almendares 27-yard field goal (13 plays, 62 yards, 4:59)	LA 30–7
3	04:25	GASO	Marcus Sanders Jr. 25-yard pass from Kyle Vantrease (Alex Raynor kick) (9 plays, 68 yards, 3:08)	LA 30–14
4	14:09	LA	Kenneth Almendares 42-yard field goal (11 plays, 45 yards, 5:16)	LA 33–14
4	11:59	GASO	Alex Raynor 39-yard field goal (8 plays, 60 yards, 2:10)	LA 33–17
4	10:13	LA	Kenneth Almendares 40-yard field goal (5 plays, 19 yards, 1:46)	LA 36–17

Statistics	Georgia Southern	Louisiana
First downs	24	22
Total yards	430	435
Rushing yards	72	242
Passing yards	358	193
Turnovers	1	1
Time of possession	28:18	31:42

Team	Category	Player	Statistics
Georgia Southern	Passing	Kyle Vantrease	28/49, 325 yards, 1 TD
Georgia Southern	Rushing	Gerald Green	10 carries, 44 yards
Georgia Southern	Receiving	Derwin Burgess Jr.	5 receptions, 75 yards, 1 TD
Louisiana	Passing	Ben Wooldridge	17/31, 193 yards, 3 TD, 1 INT
Louisiana	Rushing	Chris Smith	17 carries, 80 yards
Louisiana	Receiving	Michael Jefferson	3 receptions, 53 yards, 1 TD

=== At No. 19 Florida State ===
Louisiana at No. 19 Florida State

Team	1	2	3	4	Total
Ragin' Cajuns	0	3	0	14	17
• No. 19 Seminoles	21	14	14	0	49

- Date: November 19, 2022
- Location: Doak Campbell Stadium
  Tallahassee, Florida
- Game start: 11:03 a.m. CDT
- Elapsed time: 3 hours and 15 minutes
- Game attendance: 58,597
- Game weather: 58 °F (14 °C) • Weather: Cloudy • Wind: SW 9 MPH
- Referee: Riley Johnson
- TV announcers (ACCRSN): Tom Werme (play–by–play), James Bates (analyst), and Wiley Ballard (sideline reporter)

Scoring summary
1	12:29	FSU	Treshaun Ward 36-yard rush (Ryan Fitzgerald kick) (8 plays, 75 yards, 2:31)	FSU 7–0
1	07:37	FSU	Jordan Travis 3-yard rush (Ryan Fitzgerald kick) (8 plays, 65 yards, 3:25)	FSU 14–0
1	01:58	FSU	Jordan Travis 13-yard rush (Ryan Fitzgerald kick) (7 plays, 53 yards, 2:25)	FSU 21–0
2	06:59	FSU	Treshaun Ward 1-yard rush (Ryan Fitzgerald kick) (8 plays, 44 yards, 3:25)	FSU 28–0
2	03:14	FSU	Malik McClain 9-yard pass from Jordan Travis (Ryan Fitzgerald kick) (6 plays, 68 yards, 2:49)	FSU 35–0
2	00:00	LA	Kenneth Almendares 24-yard field goal (14 plays, 68 yards, 3:14)	FSU 35–3
3	10:05	FSU	Trey Benson 2-yard rush (Ryan Fitzgerald kick) (4 plays, 72 yards, 2:04)	FSU 42–3
3	08:22	FSU	Markeston Douglas 16-yard pass from A. J. Duffy (Ryan Fitzgerald kick) (3 plays, 18 yards, 1:29)	FSU 49–3
4	11:07	LA	Michael Jefferson 5-yard pass from Chandler Fields (Kenneth Almendares kick) (12 plays, 64 yards, 4:44)	FSU 49–10
4	05:16	LA	Chandler Fields 5-yard rush (Kenneth Almendares kick) (8 plays, 64 yards, 4:12)	FSU 49–17

Statistics	Louisiana	Florida State
First downs	18	23
Total yards	291	440
Rushing yards	132	251
Passing yards	159	189
Turnovers	1	0
Time of possession	29:16	30:44

Team	Category	Player	Statistics
Louisiana	Passing	Chandler Fields	19/36, 159 yards, 1 TD
Louisiana	Rushing	Dre'lyn Washington	10 carries, 57 yards
Louisiana	Receiving	Michael Jefferson	6 receptions, 60 yards, 1 TD
Florida State	Passing	Jordan Travis	9/14, 112 yards, 1 TD
Florida State	Rushing	Trey Benson	16 carries, 80 yards, 1 TD
Florida State	Receiving	Kentron Poitier	1 reception, 45 yards

=== At Texas State ===
Louisiana at Texas State

Team	1	2	3	4	Total
• Ragin' Cajuns	7	13	7	14	41
Bobcats	3	3	7	0	13

- Date: November 26, 2022
- Location: Bobcat Stadium
  San Marcos, Texas
- Game start: 4:02 p.m. CDT
- Elapsed time: 3 hours and 8 minutes
- Game attendance: 15,035
- Game weather: 59 °F (15 °C) • Weather: Sunny • Wind: W 21 MPH
- Referee: Ted Pitts
- TV announcers (ESPN+): Brant Freeman (play–by–play) and Keith Moreland (analyst)

Scoring summary
1	12:01	TXST	Seth Keller 38-yard field goal (7 plays, 45 yards, 2:59)	TXST 3–0
1	05:35	LA	Chris Smith 18-yard pass from Chandler Fields (Kenneth Almendares kick) (8 plays, 69 yards, 4:06)	LA 7–3
2	10:00	TXST	Seth Keller 40-yard field goal (10 plays, 74 yards, 5:27)	LA 7–6
2	05:38	LA	Kenneth Almendares 33-yard field goal (12 plays, 59 yards, 4:15)	LA 10–6
2	03:24	LA	Dre'lyn Washington 8-yard rush (Kenneth Almendares kick) (2 plays, 1 yard, 0:49)	LA 17–6
2	00:00	LA	Kenneth Almendares 27-yard field goal (6 plays, 51 yards, 0:47)	LA 20–6
3	12:19	LA	Chris Smith 1-yard rush (Kenneth Almendares kick) (8 plays, 61 yards, 2:33)	LA 27–6
3	10:23	TXST	Lincoln Pare 64-yard rush (Seth Keller kick) (4 plays, 75 yards, 1:56)	LA 27–13
4	12:08	LA	Peter LeBlanc 3-yard pass from Chandler Fields (Kenneth Almendares kick) (7 plays, 56 yards, 3:32)	LA 34–13
4	02:58	LA	Lance Legendre 37-yard pass from Zeon Chriss (Kenneth Almendares kick) (10 plays, 84 yards, 6:02)	LA 41–13

Statistics	Louisiana	Texas State
First downs	27	15
Total yards	436	356
Rushing yards	165	223
Passing yards	271	133
Turnovers	1	2
Time of possession	30:34	29:26

Team	Category	Player	Statistics
Louisiana	Passing	Chandler Fields	16/26, 187 yards, 2 TDs, 1 INT
Louisiana	Rushing	Dre'lyn Washington	10 carries, 73 yards, 1 TD
Louisiana	Receiving	Lance Legendre	4 receptions, 81 yards, 1 TD
Texas State	Passing	Layne Hatcher	13/27, 133 yards, 1 INT
Texas State	Rushing	Lincoln Pare	4 receptions, 81 yards, 1 TD
Texas State	Receiving	Charles Brown	3 receptions, 60 yards

=== Vs. Houston (Independence Bowl) ===
Houston vs. Louisiana

Team	1	2	3	4	Total
• Cougars	0	6	7	10	23
Ragin' Cajuns	7	9	0	0	16

- Date: December 23, 2022
- Location: Independence Stadium
  Shreveport, LA
- Game start: 2:00 p.m. CDT
- Elapsed time: 3 hours and 36 minutes
- Game attendance: 23,410
- Game weather: 25 °F (−4 °C) • Weather: Sunny • Wind: NW 15 MPH
- Referee: Scott Hardin
- TV announcers (ESPN): Dave Neal (play–by–play), Deuce McAllister (analyst), and Harry Lyles Jr. (sideline reporter)

Scoring summary
1	07:39	LA	Johnny Lumpkin 4-yard pass from Chandler Fields (Kenneth Almendares kick) (15 plays, 75 yards, 7:21)	LA 7–0
2	09:35	LA	Kenneth Almendares 42-yard field goal (7 plays, 39 yards, 3:43)	LA 10–0
2	07:05	LA	Kenneth Almendares 42-yard field goal (4 plays, 3 yards, 0:58)	LA 13–0
2	03:00	HOU	KeSean Carter 33-yard pass from Clayton Tune (Kyle Ramsey PAT failed) (9 plays, 80 yards, 3:59)	LA 13–6
2	00:02	LA	Kenneth Almendares 32-yard field goal (13 plays, 83 yards, 2:51)	LA 16–6
3	09:21	HOU	Nathaniel Dell 2-yard pass from Clayton Tune (Kyle Ramsey kick) (13 plays, 70 yards, 5:33)	LA 16–13
4	13:40	HOU	Kyle Ramsey 19-yard field goal (8 plays, 31 yards, 4:02)	TIE 16–16
4	00:20	HOU	Nathaniel Dell 12-yard pass from Clayton Tune (Kyle Ramsey kick) (6 plays, 92 yards, 2:39)	HOU 23–16

Statistics	Houston	Louisiana
First downs	21	21
Total yards	363	323
Rushing yards	139	129
Passing yards	224	194
Turnovers	0	3
Time of possession	30:19	29:41

Team	Category	Player	Statistics
Houston	Passing	Clayton Tune	19/28, 224 yards, 3 TDs
Houston	Rushing	Clayton Tune	11 carries, 55 yards
Houston	Receiving	KeSean Carter	4 receptions, 112 yards, 1 TD
Louisiana	Passing	Chandler Fields	17/25, 169 yards, 1 TD
Louisiana	Rushing	Chris Smith	14 carries, 48 yards
Louisiana	Receiving	Lance Legendre	5 receptions, 56 yards

== Rankings ==
Ranking movements Legend: ██ Increase in ranking ██ Decrease in ranking — = Not ranked RV = Received votes
	Week															
Poll	Pre	1	2	3	4	5	6	7	8	9	10	11	12	13	14	Final
AP	—															
Coaches	RV	RV	—													
CFP	Not released															Not released
