= David Lee (punter) =

American football player (1943–2026)

- Lee, 1970

No. 49
- Position: Punter

Personal information
- Born: November 8, 1943; Shreveport, Louisiana, U.S.
- Died: May 11, 2026 (aged 82)
- Listed height: 6 ft 4 in (1.93 m)
- Listed weight: 203 lb (92 kg)

Career information
- High school: Minden (Minden, Louisiana)
- College: Louisiana Tech (1961–1964)
- AFL draft: 1965: 18th round, 137th overall pick

Career history
- Cleveland Browns (1965)*; Baltimore Colts (1966–1978)
- * Offseason or practice squad member only

Awards and highlights
- Super Bowl champion (V); NFL champion (1968); First-team All-Pro (1969); Second-team All-Pro (1970)

Career statistics
- Punts: 838
- Punting yards: 34,019
- Punt blocks: 11
- Games played: 184
- Stats at Pro Football Reference

David Allen Lee (November 8, 1943 – May 11, 2026) was an American professional football player who was a punter for the Baltimore Colts of the National Football League (NFL) from 1966 to 1978. Lee was a member of the Colts' 1968 NFL Championship and Super Bowl V winning teams. He played college football for the Louisiana Tech Bulldogs.

== Early life ==
Lee was born in Shreveport, Louisiana, on November 8, 1943, to Roy and Hazel Lee. He was raised in Minden, Louisiana, along with three other siblings. Lee was a star athlete at Minden High School, where he was a Louisiana All-State selection in basketball, baseball, and as a punter on the football team. He also participated in track in field. Both of Lee's parents played high school basketball and he was raised in an athletic family. His younger brother, Danny, also later played football at then Northeast Louisiana.

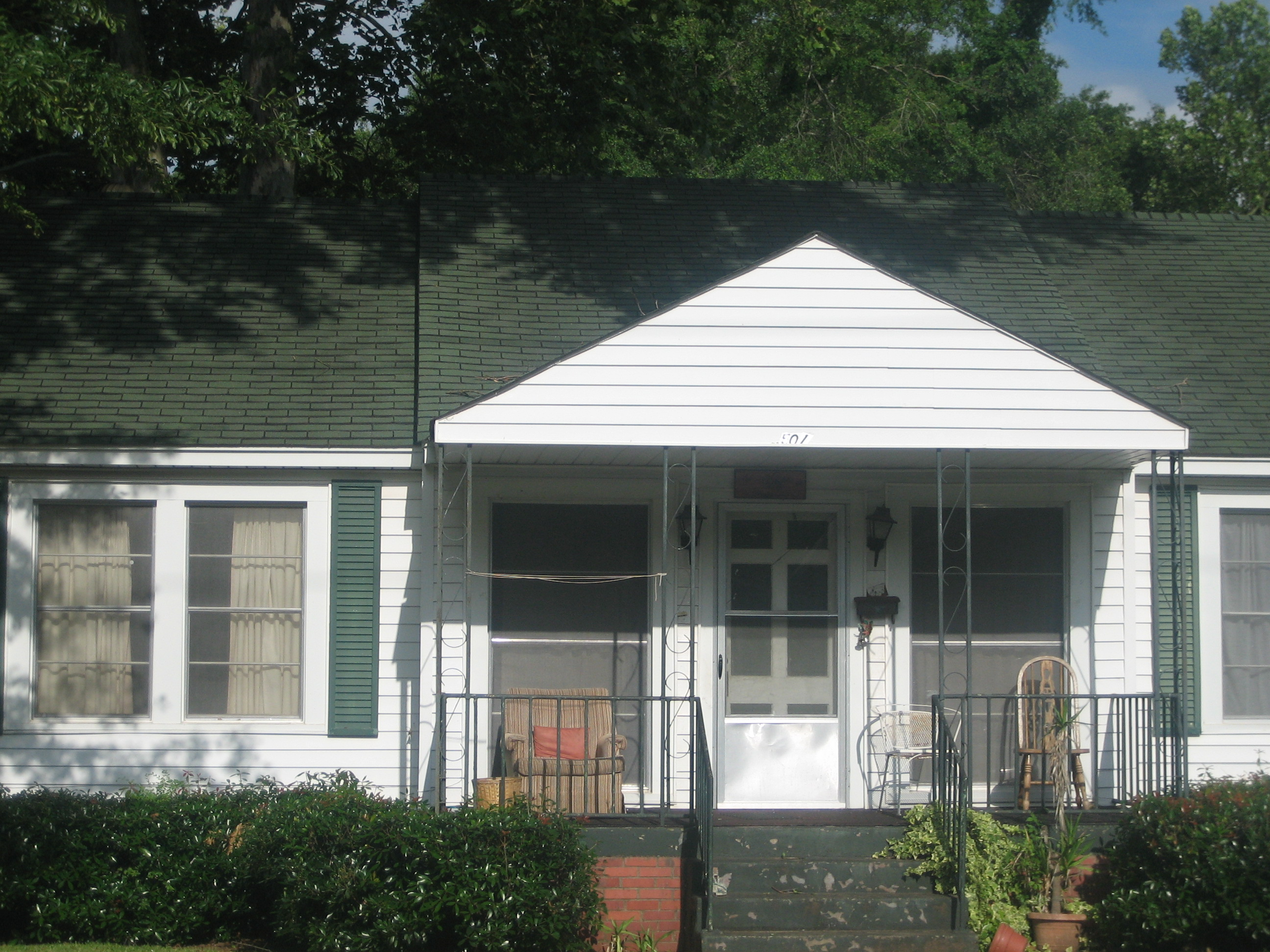
Lee's childhood home in Minden, Louisiana

== College career ==
Lee joined Louisiana Tech as a punter in an era of football where specialized kickers were uncommon. Louisiana Tech head coach Joe Aillet helped hone Lee's kicking style. Utilizing his long legs, Lee became a formidable punter. In his 1961 freshman season, Lee had 49 punts for 1,963 yards and a 40.6 yards per punt average. As a sophomore, Lee was used as an end on offense, but also maintained his specialized role as a punter.

As a junior, Lee punted 44 times for 1,815 yards and a 41.3 yard per punt average. In his 1964 senior season, Louisiana Tech went 9–1 on the year and won the Gulf States Conference. That season, Lee had 46 punts for 1,772 yards, an average of 38.5 yards.

On October 1, 2011, Lee was inducted into the Louisiana Tech University Athletic Hall of Fame. Lee also lettered in baseball while at Louisiana Tech.

== Professional career ==
Lee was drafted in the 1965 AFL draft by the Boston Patriots in the 18th round, 137th overall selection. Instead of joining the Patriots, Lee was recruited by coach Dub Jones to play for the Cleveland Browns of the National Football League. Lee spent the 1965 season on the Browns' taxi squad.

=== Baltimore Colts (1966–1978) ===
Prior to the 1966 season, Lee was traded by the Browns to the Baltimore Colts in exchange for a draft selection. In his debut 1966 season, Lee became the Colts' full-time punter and led the NFL in punting average, with 45.6 yards per punt on 49 punts for a total of 2,233 yards. In 1968, Lee was a member of the Colts' 1968 NFL Championship team, where the Colts defeated the Browns 34–0. The Colts were then famously upset by Joe Namath and the New York Jets in Super Bowl III, in which Lee punted three times for an average of 44.3 yards.

Lee again led the league in punt average in 1969 with 45.3 yards per punt and was named to the 1969 All-Pro First team. The next season, Lee and the Colts won Super Bowl V over the Dallas Cowboys, with Lee punting four times for 166 yards. Lee had 63 punts on the season for 2,819 yards, a 44.7 yards per punt average. He was named to the 1970 All-Pro Second team. In 1971, Lee recorded his longest career punt of 76 yards in a 31–7 victory over the New York Giants at Yankee Stadium.

On November 11, 1973, Miami Dolphins cornerback Tim Foley blocked two of Lee's punts, returning both for touchdowns in a 44-0 win. Foley remains the only NFL player in history to achieve this feat.

Lee retired after the 1978 season. Overall, in 184 NFL games, Lee averaged 40.6 yards per punt. His 184 games, 838 punts, and 34,019 still rank as the second overall in Colts history.

== Personal life and death ==
Lee married his high school sweetheart, Sandra, and the couple had two children. After retiring from football, Lee moved to Bossier City, Louisiana, and worked at a General Motors facility as an executive.

Lee died at the age of 82 on May 11, 2026, in Jasper, Georgia, where he had relocated in 2021 to be near family members.
