= Minden High School (Louisiana) =

High school in Louisiana, United States

Location
- 400 College St. Minden, (Webster Parish), Louisiana 71055; United States; 32.6193°N 93.2890°W

Information
- Type: Public
- School district: Webster Parish School Board
- Principal: Ben Bower
- Teaching staff: 53.00 (FTE)
- Grades: 9–12
- Enrollment: 761 (2023-2024)
- Student to teacher ratio: 14.36
- Colors: Crimson and white
- Athletics conference: LHSAA District 1-4A
- Nickname: Crimson Tide
- Website: https://mhs.websterpsb.org/

Minden High School serves 9th to 12th grade students in Webster Parish, Louisiana. The school in Minden, Louisiana was preceded by Minden Academy. It is part of the Minden School District.

According to U.S. News the school's student body was approximately 55 percent African American and 42 percent white in 2020.

== History ==
S. R. Emmons was principal in 1938. The Library of Congress has a photo of the school from the early 20th century.

At one point in school history, the football team wore green and white and were known as the Greenbacks.

Students who graduated from 1962 to 1966 were part of a study.

Webster High School which served African American students was consolidated into it. Harlem Globetrotter Louis Dunbar graduated from Webster High.

== Athletics ==
Minden High athletics competes in the LHSAA. The school's teams compete as the Crimson Tide and crimson and white are the school colors.

=== Championships ===
Football championships

- (5) State championships: 1938, 1954, 1956, 1963, 1980

The school has won five football state championships and also baseball state championships.

== Alumni ==
=== Artists ===
- Barbara Colley, novelist

=== Politicians and judges ===
- Jerry Huckaby, state legislator
- Robert Floyd Kennon, Louisiana Supreme Court justice and governor of Louisiana
- R. Harmon Drew Sr., state legislator
- R. Harmon Drew Jr., judge
- J. D. Batton, sheriff
- Hayden Haynes, Chief of Staff to U.S. House Speaker Mike Johnson

=== Football players ===
- Larry Clinton Brewer, Louisiana Tech wide receiver; a back injury derailed his pro career.
- Ken Beck
- Pat Coffee
- Sammy Odom
- Charley Hennigan
- Clyde Williams (Webster High School)
- David Lee, punter for former Baltimore Colts from 1967 to 1971
- James Britt
- Darryl Moore
- L'Jarius Sneed
- Stepfret Williams
- Kenyon Cotton

=== Other athletes ===
- Louis Dunbar, Webster High School
- Jackie Moreland (1938 - 1971), basketball
