= J. D. Batton =

American politician

John David "J. D." Batton
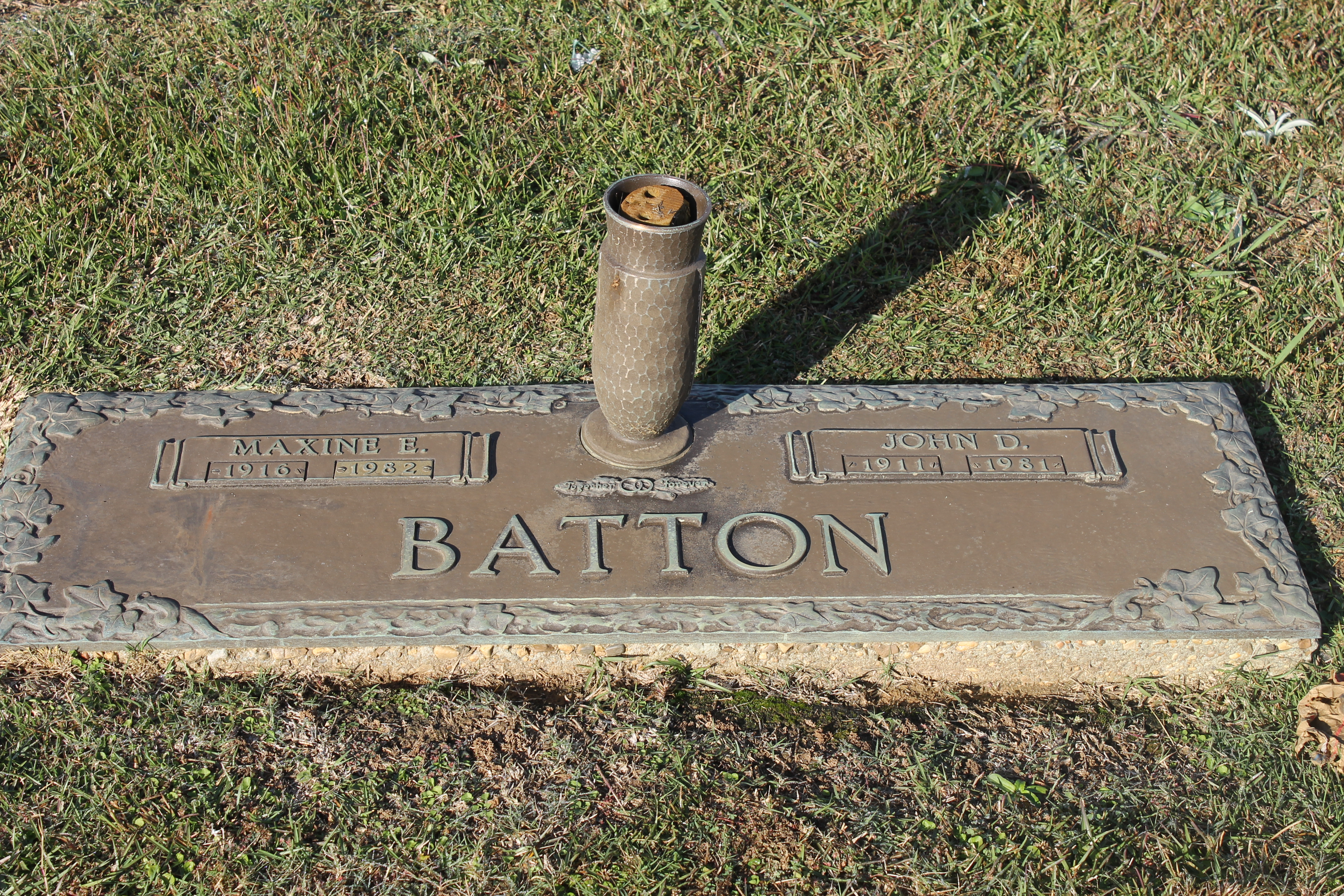
- Grave of former Sheriff J. D. Batton of Webster Parish in Gardens of Memory Cemetery in Minden, LA

Sheriff of Webster Parish, Louisiana
- In office July 1, 1952 – May 1, 1964
- Preceded by: O. H. Haynes Sr.
- Succeeded by: O. H. Haynes Jr.

Chief of Police of Minden, Louisiana
- In office July 1, 1948 – July 1, 1952
- Preceded by: Mrs. Benjamin Garey Gantt (interim)
- Succeeded by: Otis F. Minter Sr.

Personal details
- Born: February 13, 1911 Minden, Webster Parish; Louisiana, US
- Died: February 10, 1981 (aged 69) Minden, Louisiana
- Resting place: Gardens of Memory Cemetery in Minden
- Party: Democratic
- Spouse: Maxine Evans Batton
- Relations: Jack Batton (brother)
- Children: Roger Evans Batton John Willis Batton Karen Sue Batton
- Education: Minden High School; Tyler Commercial College
- Occupation: Law-enforcement officer Businessman

John David Batton (February 13, 1911 – February 10, 1981) was from 1952 to 1964 the sheriff of his native Webster Parish in northwestern Louisiana. He was defeated after three terms by O. H. Haynes Jr., a fellow Democrat and the son of the sheriff, O. H. Haynes Sr., whom Batton had himself unseated twelve years earlier.

== Law-enforcement career ==
=== Webster Parish Sheriff ===
Shortly after his first reelection, Batton was named one of seventeen directors of the Webster Parish Citizens' Council, a body which sought to prevent school desegregation. Others in the council were the mortician Ed Kleinegger, Tax Assessor Richard B. Garrison, and the Minden High School principal, W. W. Williams.

Preceded by O. H. Haynes Sr.	Sheriff of Webster Parish, Louisiana; 1952–1964	Succeeded by O. H. Haynes Jr.
Preceded by Mrs. Benjamin Gary Gantt (interim)	Chief of Police of Minden, Louisiana; 1948–1952	Succeeded by Otis F. "Bill" Minter Sr.
