= Ascension Episcopal School =

Coordinates: 30°05′08″N 91°54′48″W

Location
- 1030 Johnston Street; Lafayette, (Lafayette Parish), Louisiana 70592; United States

Information
- Motto: Educational Excellence in a Christian environment
- Established: 1959
- Headmaster: Sarah Lee
- Colors: Navy, Columbia blue, and silver
- Mascot: Blue Gators
- Revenue: 15.5M
- Website: www.ascensionbluegators.org

Ascension Episcopal School (AES), formally known as Ascension Day School (ADS), is a Private school in Lafayette Parish, Louisiana. It was founded in 1959 and consists of three separate campuses consisting of a preschool, an elementary school, a middle school, and a high school. It is accredited by the Independent Schools Association of the Southwest.

== History ==
Ascension Day School was founded in 1959 by Jeanette Parker with the support of the Rev. David J. Coughlin, then rector of the Episcopal Church of the Ascension, and several other dedicated parishioners and professionals. Parker served as the first Headmistress until 1968.

== Athletics ==
Ascension Episcopal athletics competes in the LHSAA.

=== Championships ===
Football championships

- (1) State Championship: 2016
- Golf championships

(5) State Championship: 2018, 2019, 2022, 2023, 2024

- Baseball championships

(2) State Championship: (2017, 2019)

== Notable alumni ==
- Peyton Woodring, college football placekicker for the Georgia Bulldogs
