= Ben Wooldridge =

American football player (born 1999)

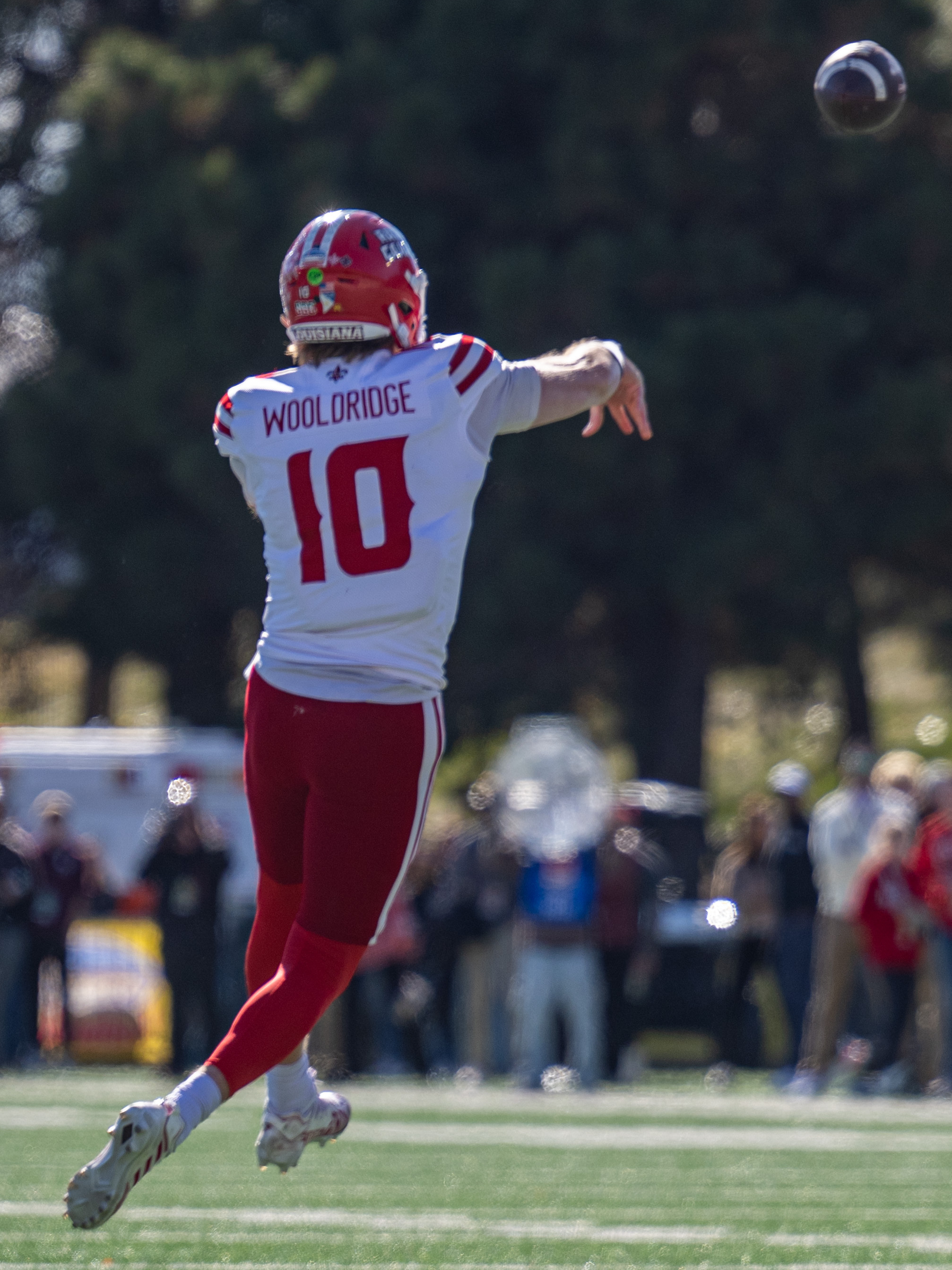
- Wooldridge with Louisiana in 2024

Calgary Stampeders
- Position: Quarterback
- Roster status: Practice roster
- CFL status: American

Personal information
- Born: September 27, 1999 (age 27); Pleasanton, California, U.S.
- Listed height: 6 ft 2 in (1.88 m)
- Listed weight: 214 lb (97 kg)

Career information
- High school: Foothill (Pleasanton)
- College: Fresno State (2018–2020); Louisiana (2021–2024)
- NFL draft: 2025: undrafted

Career history
- New England Patriots (2025)*; St. Louis Battlehawks (2026)*; Calgary Stampeders (2026–present)
- * Offseason or practice squad member only

Awards and highlights
- Sun Belt Offensive Player of the Year (2024); First-team All-Sun Belt (2024)

Ben Wooldridge (born September 27, 1999) is an American professional football quarterback for the Calgary Stampeders of the Canadian Football League (CFL). He played college football for the Fresno State Bulldogs and Louisiana Ragin' Cajuns.

== Early life ==
Wooldridge grew up in Pleasanton, California and attended Foothill High School. He was a two-star rated recruit and committed to play college football at California State University, Fresno.

== College career ==
=== Fresno State ===
Wooldridge did not participate in any games during his true freshman season in 2018 and was ultimately redshirted. During the 2019 season, he played in three games, finishing the season with completing four out of six passing attempts for 30 yards and a touchdown. He also made two carries for 13 yards. During the 2020 season, he played in two games, finishing the season with completing eight out of 16 passing attempts for 117 yards and two carries for 13 yards.

On December 16, 2020, Wooldridge announced that he would enter the transfer portal.

=== Louisiana ===
On January 27, 2021, Wooldridge announced that he would transfer to Louisiana.

Wooldridge did not make an appearance during the 2021 season. During the 2022 season, he took over the starting quarterback position midway through the season after an injury from Chandler Fields. He played in 10 games and started five of them before suffering a season-ending injury in November. He finished the season with completing 138 out of 244 passing attempts for 1,661 yards, 15 touchdowns, five interceptions, 48 rushes for 188 yards and a pair of touchdowns. During the 2023 season, he played in three games before enduring another injury during an away game against UAB. He finished the season with completing 39 out of 69 passing attempts for 508 yards, five touchdowns, an interception, 17 rushes for 77 yards and a pair of touchdowns.

=== Statistics ===
Season	Team	Games			Passing								Rushing			
Season	Team	GP	GS	Record	Cmp	Att	Pct	Yds	Avg	TD	Int	Rtg	Att	Yds	Avg	TD
2018	Fresno State	Redshirt (redshirt)														
2019	Fresno State	3	0	—	4	6	66.7	30	5.0	1	0	163.7	2	13	6.5	0
2020	Fresno State	2	0	—	8	16	50.0	117	7.3	0	0	111.4	2	13	6.5	0
2021	Louisiana	DNP														
2022	Louisiana	10	5	3–2	138	244	56.6	1,661	6.8	15	5	129.9	48	188	3.9	2
2023	Louisiana	3	3	2–1	39	69	56.5	508	7.4	5	1	139.4	17	73	4.3	2
2024	Louisiana	11	11	8–3	192	291	66.0	2,453	8.4	17	6	151.9	65	174	2.7	5
Career		29	19	13–6	381	626	60.9	4,769	7.6	38	12	141.1	134	461	3.4	9

== Professional career ==
Pre-draft measurables
Height	Weight	Arm length	Hand span	Wingspan	40-yard dash	10-yard split	20-yard split	20-yard shuttle	Vertical jump	Broad jump
6 ft 2 3/8 in (1.89 m)	214 lb (97 kg)	32 in (0.81 m)	9 1/4 in (0.23 m)	6 ft 6 3/4 in (2.00 m)	4.82 s	1.64 s	2.81 s	4.35 s	34.0 in (0.86 m)	9 ft 7 in (2.92 m)
All values from Pro Day

=== New England Patriots ===
On May 9, 2025, Wooldridge signed with the New England Patriots as an undrafted free agent after going unselected in the 2025 NFL draft, becoming the third-string quarterback behind Drake Maye and Joshua Dobbs. He played the third and final preseason game for the team against the New York Giants on August 21, which ended in a 42–10 loss for the Patriots. He was cut from the roster the following day.

=== St. Louis Battlehawks ===
On January 12, 2026, Wooldridge was signed by the St. Louis Battlehawks of the United Football League (UFL). He was released by the Battlehawks on March 19.

=== Calgary Stampeders ===
On March 30, 2026, Wooldridge signed with the Calgary Stampeders of the Canadian Football League (CFL).
