= 2021 New Orleans Bowl =

Postseason college football bowl game

2021 R+L Carriers New Orleans Bowl
- 21st New Orleans Bowl
Louisiana Ragin' Cajuns	Marshall Thundering Herd
(12–1)	(7–5)
Sun Belt Conference	C–USA
36	21
Head coach: Michael Desormeaux (interim)	Head coach: Charles Huff
AP / Coaches / CFP; 16 / 17 / 23
	1	2	3	4	Total
Louisiana	10	6	0	20	36
Marshall	7	7	7	0	21
- Date: December 18, 2021
- Season: 2021
- Stadium: Caesars Superdome
- Location: New Orleans, Louisiana
- MVP: Levi Lewis (QB, Louisiana)
- Favorite: Louisiana by 6
- Referee: Mike Cuttone (Mountain West)
- Attendance: 21,642

United States TV coverage
- Network: ESPN
- Announcers: Anish Shroff (play-by-play), Mike Golic Jr. (analyst), and Taylor McGregor (sideline)

The 2021 New Orleans Bowl was a college football bowl game played on December 18, 2021, with kickoff at 9:15 p.m. EST (8:15 p.m. local CST) and broadcast on ESPN. It was the 21st edition of the New Orleans Bowl, and was one of the 2021–22 bowl games concluding the 2021 FBS football season. Sponsored by freight shipping company R+L Carriers, the game was officially known as the R+L Carriers New Orleans Bowl.

== Teams ==
The bowl matched Louisiana of the Sun Belt Conference against Marshall of Conference USA (C-USA). This was the first meeting of the two programs. Marshall previously announced that they plan to join the Sun Belt for the 2023 season.

=== Louisiana ===
The Cajuns (12–1, 8–0 in Sun Belt play) entered the contest with a 12-game win streak, ranked 23rd in the nation, two consecutive bowl victories (2020 LendingTree and 2020 First Responder), four consecutive divisional championship, two consecutive conference championship, and a new head coach in Michael Desormeaux following Billy Napier's sudden departure to Florida. This was the Cajuns sixth time in the New Orleans Bowl (2011–2014, 2015), with an overall record of 2–1 following two vacated victories in the 2011 and 2013 matchups. The Cajuns' overall bowl record was 7–3, with its most recent bowl game, the 2020 First Responder Bowl, resulting in a win over UTSA.

=== Marshall ===
The Thundering Herd finished the 2021 regular season with a 7–5 (5–3 C-USA) record to finish in a tie for second place in the East Division. This game was the team's first appearance in the New Orleans Bowl and 18th overall bowl. This was Marshall's first bowl game against a team from the Sun Belt Conference since the 2011 Beef 'O' Brady's Bowl, a win over FIU.

== Game summary ==
2021 R+L Carriers New Orleans Bowl

Quarter	1	2	3	4	Total
No. 23 Louisiana	10	6	0	20	36
Marshall	7	7	7	0	21

at Caesars Superdome • New Orleans, Louisiana

- Date: Saturday, December 18, 2021
- Game time: 9:15 p.m. EST (8:15 p.m. local CST)
- Game attendance: 21,642
- TV announcers (ESPN): Anish Shroff (play-by-play), Mike Golic Jr. (analyst), and Taylor McGregor (sideline)
- Box score

Game information

First quarter

- 9:26 UL – Kyren Lacy 9-yard pass from Levi Lewis, Nate Snyder kick good. Drive: 13 plays, 81 yards, 5:34. Louisiana 7–0
- 1:29 UL – Nate Snyder 42-yard field goal. Drive: 13 plays, 40 yards, 6:35. Louisiana 10–0
- 0:50 MRSH – Rasheen Ali 63-yard run, Shane Ciucci kick good. Drive: 3 plays, 75 yards, 0:39. Louisiana 10–7

Second quarter

- 10:32 MRSH – Rasheen Ali 14-yard run, Shane Ciucci kick good. Drive: 3 plays, 58 yards, 1:10. Marshall 14–10
- 1:28 UL – Nate Snyder 25-yard field goal. Drive: 8 plays, 75 yards, 4:27. Marshall 14–13
- 0:00 UL – Nate Snyder 24-yard field goal. Drive: 5 plays, 39 yards, 0:43. Louisiana 16–14

Third quarter

- 1:01 MRSH – Rasheen Ali 9-yard run, Shane Ciucci kick good. Drive: 13 plays, 63 yards, 4:20. Marshall 21–16

Fourth quarter

- 8:20 UL – Emani Bailey 4-yard run, conversion pass failed. Drive: 8 plays, 68 yards, 3:34. Louisiana 22–21
- 3:54 UL – Montrell Johnson 3-yard run, Nate Snyder kick good. Drive: 6 plays, 73 yards, 2:34. Louisiana 29–21
- 1:41 UL – Emani Bailey 2-yard run, Nate Snyder kick good. Drive: 6 plays, 52 yards, 1:45. Louisiana 36–21

=== Statistics ===
Statistics	UL	MRSH
First downs	22	13
Plays–yards	83–498	56–278
Rushes–yards	51–220	30–179
Passing yards	278	99
Passing: comp–att–int	20–32–0	15–26–2
Turnovers		
Time of possession	37:26	22:34

Team	Category	Player	Statistics
Louisiana	Passing	Levi Lewis	19/31, 270 yards, TD
Louisiana	Rushing	Emani Bailey	17 carries, 94 yards, 2 TD
Louisiana	Receiving	Michael Jefferson	3 receptions, 108 yards
Marshall	Passing	Grant Wells	15/26, 99 yards, INT
Marshall	Rushing	Rasheen Ali	20 carries, 160 yards, 3 TD
Marshall	Receiving	Corey Gammage	9 receptions, 50 yards
