= Kenyon Cotton =

American football player (1974–2010)

No. 23
- Position: Fullback

Personal information
- Born: February 23, 1974; Bossier City, Louisiana, U.S.
- Died: July 23, 2010 (aged 36); Baton Rouge, Louisiana, U.S.
- Listed height: 6 ft 0 in (1.83 m)
- Listed weight: 255 lb (116 kg)

Career information
- High school: Minden (LA)
- College: Louisiana–Lafayette
- NFL draft: 1997: undrafted

Career history
- Baltimore Ravens (1997–1998)

Career NFL statistics
- Games played: 27
- Kickoff returns: 2
- Return yards: 33
- Touchdowns: 1
- Stats at Pro Football Reference

Timothy Kenyon Cotton (February 23, 1974 – July 23, 2010) was a fullback for the Baltimore Ravens of the NFL.

== College ==
He played college football at ULL.

== NFL career ==
Cotton played two years in the NFL, both with the Ravens. He had a career total four attempts, 10 yards, a 2.5 average per carry, and one touchdown.

== Death ==
On July 17, 2010, Cotton died from complications resulting from Achilles tendon surgery.
