= Johnny Lumpkin =

American football player (born 1997)

Profile
- Position: Tight end

Personal information
- Born: September 3, 1997 (age 29); Atlanta, Georgia, U.S.
- Listed height: 6 ft 5 in (1.96 m)
- Listed weight: 264 lb (120 kg)

Career information
- High school: Frederick Douglass (Atlanta, Georgia)
- College: Hutchinson (2016–2017); Louisiana (2018–2022)
- NFL draft: 2023: undrafted

Career history
- New England Patriots (2023)*; Indianapolis Colts (2023)*; Denver Broncos (2023)*; Green Bay Packers (2024)*
- * Offseason or practice squad member only
- Stats at Pro Football Reference

Jonathan Lumpkin (born September 3, 1997) is an American professional football tight end. He played college football at Hutchinson before transferring to Louisiana. He was signed by the Patriots as an undrafted free agent following the 2023 NFL draft.

== Early life ==
Lumpkin went to Frederick Douglass High School, and was a 3-star recruit who held 17 D1 offers. He was a member of the first team All-Region senior year of high school, and also played basketball starting in all games as both a junior and senior.

== College career ==
Lumpkin played college football for the Hutchinson Blue Dragons and later for the Louisiana Ragin' Cajuns.

== Professional career ==
Pre-draft measurables
Height	Weight	Arm length	Hand span	40-yard dash	10-yard split	20-yard split	20-yard shuttle	Three-cone drill	Vertical jump	Broad jump	Bench press
6 ft 5 3/8 in (1.97 m)	264 lb (120 kg)	35 1/4 in (0.90 m)	10 1/4 in (0.26 m)	4.81 s	1.61 s	2.74 s	4.53 s	7.48 s	32 in (0.81 m)	10 ft 0 in (3.05 m)	13 reps
All values from Pro Day

=== New England Patriots ===
After going undrafted in the 2023 NFL draft, Lumpkin signed with the New England Patriots of the National Football League (NFL) on April 30, 2023. He was waived by the Patriots on August 27.

=== Indianapolis Colts ===
On August 31, 2023, Lumpkin was signed to the Indianapolis Colts' practice squad. He was released on September 12.

=== Denver Broncos ===
On January 2, 2024, Lumpkin was signed to the Denver Broncos practice squad. He was not signed to a reserve/future contract and thus became a free agent at the end of the season.

=== Green Bay Packers ===
Lumpkin was signed to the Green Bay Packers practice squad on September 10, 2024. He was released by Green Bay on September 24.

On January 14, 2025, Lumpkin signed a reserve/futures contract with the Packers. He was released on August 26 as part of final roster cuts.
