= Chandler Fields =

American football player (born 2000)

No. 18
- Position: Quarterback

Personal information
- Born: February 4, 2000 (age 26)
- Listed height: 5 ft 10 in (1.78 m)
- Listed weight: 195 lb (88 kg)

Career information
- High school: Archbishop Rummel (Metairie, Louisiana)
- College: Louisiana (2019–2024)
- Stats at ESPN

Chandler Fields (born February 4, 2000) is an American former college football player who was a quarterback for the Louisiana Ragin' Cajuns.

== Early life ==
Fields grew up in Metairie, Louisiana and attended Holy Cross School before transferring to Archbishop Rummel High School during his junior year. In his high school football career, he completed 179 out of 303 passing attempts for 2,359 yards, 30 touchdowns and five interceptions during his junior year. He was rated a three-star recruit and committed to play college football at Louisiana over offers from Memphis, Nicholls State and Jackson State.

== College career ==
During his true freshman season in 2019, Field appeared in only three games. During the 2020 season, he made appearances in only two games and made six passing attempts by the end of the season. During the 2021 season, he appeared in eight games and finished the season by completing nine out of 13 passing attempts for 106 yards and a touchdown. During the 2022 season, he was named the team's starting quarterback and started the first five games of the season and played for the final three games of the season due to an injury. He finished the season by throwing 1,182 yards and 11 touchdowns. During the 2022 Independence Bowl, he completed 17 out of 25 passing attempts for 169 yards and a scoring pass and a season-high 32 yards on the ground.

=== Statistics ===
Year	Team	Games			Passing								Rushing			
Year	Team	GP	GS	Record	Cmp	Att	Pct	Yds	Avg	TD	Int	Rtg	Att	Yds	Avg	TD
2019	Louisiana	3	0	—	3	3	100.0	16	5.3	0	0	144.8	1	4	4.0	0
2020	Louisiana	2	0	—	0	6	0.0	0	0.0	0	0	0.0	1	-6	-6.0	0
2021	Louisiana	8	0	—	9	13	69.2	106	8.2	1	0	163.1	3	14	4.7	0
2022	Louisiana	8	8	3−5	106	182	58.2	1,123	6.2	11	4	125.6	36	87	2.4	2
2023	Louisiana	7	4	1−3	96	143	67.1	1,069	7.5	7	3	141.9	29	-18	-0.6	2
2024	Louisiana	7	3	2−1	63	87	72.4	897	10.3	5	1	175.7	26	88	3.4	2
Career		35	15	6−9	277	434	63.8	3,211	7.4	24	8	140.5	96	169	1.8	6
