= New Orleans Bowl =

Annual American college football postseason game

- Stadium: Caesars Superdome
- Location: New Orleans, Louisiana
- Temporary venue: Cajun Field, Lafayette, Louisiana (2005)
- Operated: 2001–present
- Conference tie-ins: Sun Belt, C-USA
- Previous conference tie-ins: MWC (2001, 2011, 2014)
- Payout: US$825,000 (2019)
- Website: neworleansbowl.org

Sponsors
- Wyndham Hotels & Resorts (2004); R+L Carriers (2006–2024)

Former names
- New Orleans Bowl (2001–2003); Wyndham New Orleans Bowl (2004); New Orleans Bowl at Lafayette (2005); R+L Carriers New Orleans Bowl (2006–2024)

2025 matchup
- Western Kentucky vs. Southern Miss (Western Kentucky 27–16)

The New Orleans Bowl is an NCAA-sanctioned post-season college football bowl game that has been played annually since 2001. It is normally held at Caesars Superdome in New Orleans; when the Superdome and the rest of the city suffered damage due to Hurricane Katrina in 2005, the game was temporarily moved to Cajun Field in Lafayette, Louisiana, and given the name New Orleans Bowl at Lafayette.

== History ==
The game was organized by the Greater New Orleans Sports Foundation in collaboration with the Sun Belt Conference and first played in 2001. The inaugural game had no formal title sponsor. In the 2001 inaugural game, Colorado State defeated North Texas, 45–20. Starting in 2002, the Sun Belt signed a multi-year contract with Conference USA, and the two conferences began their bowl rivalry with a North Texas defeat of then-Conference USA member Cincinnati.

Wyndham Hotels & Resorts agreed to a two-year sponsorship deal beginning in 2004 and the game was known as the Wyndham New Orleans Bowl. Due to damage by Hurricane Katrina to the Superdome, where the game is usually played, the 2005 game was played in Lafayette, Louisiana, at Cajun Field on the campus of the University of Louisiana at Lafayette, and was dubbed the New Orleans Bowl at Lafayette. Wyndham, which had no hotels in Lafayette, did not participate and did not renew its sponsorship in 2006.

The game returned to the Superdome for the 2006 edition, which was won by Troy, co-champions of the Sun Belt Conference, over Rice, making their first bowl appearance since the 1961 Bluebonnet Bowl. R+L Carriers sponsored the game, which became known as the R+L Carriers New Orleans Bowl. R+L Carries sponsored the bowl through the 2024 season.

The 2011 through 2014 games were each won by the Louisiana–Lafayette Ragin' Cajuns by a combined score of 115–88 over four different opponents. However, the Ragin' Cajuns later had to vacate their 2011 and 2013 victories, due to major NCAA violations including ACT fraud. The Ragin' Cajuns also played in the 2016 edition of the bowl, losing to Southern Miss, and in the 2021 edition as well where they defeated Marshall.

== Conference tie-ins ==
In 2001, the Sun Belt Conference signed a temporary contract to play against the fifth-ranked team from the Mountain West Conference. Beginning in 2002, the New Orleans Bowl established conference tie-ins with the Sun Belt and Conference USA (CUSA). The Sun Belt usually sends its conference champion to the New Orleans Bowl, but can (and has) sent the champion to what is now known as the 68 Ventures Bowl, such as Arkansas State playing in the 2013 GoDaddy.com Bowl. For the 2021 season, the New Orleans Bowl has first pick in the Sun Belt Conference.

In 2010, Ohio represented the Mid-American Conference (MAC) in the New Orleans Bowl, after the Bowl released UTEP to compete in the regional New Mexico Bowl. In 2011 and 2014, a Mountain West team replaced C-USA as the opponent to the Sun Belt representative.

== Game results ==
Rankings per AP poll prior to the game being played.

Date	Winning Team		Losing Team		Attendance	Notes
December 18, 2001	Colorado State	45	North Texas	20	27,004	notes
December 17, 2002	North Texas	24	Cincinnati	19	19,024	notes
December 16, 2003	Memphis	27	North Texas	17	25,184	notes
December 14, 2004	Southern Miss	31	North Texas	10	27,253	notes
December 20, 2005	Southern Miss	31	Arkansas State	19	18,338	notes
December 22, 2006	Troy	41	Rice	17	26,423	notes
December 21, 2007	Florida Atlantic	44	Memphis	27	25,146	notes
December 21, 2008	Southern Miss	30	Troy	27 (OT)	30,197	notes
December 20, 2009	Middle Tennessee	42	Southern Miss	32	30,228	notes
December 18, 2010	Troy	48	Ohio	21	29,159	notes
December 17, 2011	Louisiana-Lafayette (vacated)	32	San Diego State	30	42,841	notes
December 22, 2012	Louisiana-Lafayette	43	East Carolina	34	48,828	notes
December 21, 2013	Louisiana-Lafayette (vacated)	24	Tulane	21	54,728	notes
December 20, 2014	Louisiana-Lafayette	16	Nevada	3	34,014	notes
December 19, 2015	Louisiana Tech	47	Arkansas State	28	32,847	notes
December 17, 2016	Southern Miss	28	Louisiana-Lafayette	21	35,061	notes
December 16, 2017	Troy	50	North Texas	30	24,904	notes
December 15, 2018	Appalachian State	45	Middle Tennessee	13	23,942	notes
December 21, 2019	No. 20 Appalachian State	31	UAB	17	21,202	notes
December 23, 2020	Georgia Southern	38	Louisiana Tech	3	3,000	notes
December 18, 2021	No. 16 Louisiana	36	Marshall	21	21,642	notes
December 21, 2022	Western Kentucky	44	South Alabama	23	13,456	notes
December 16, 2023	Jacksonville State	34	Louisiana	31 (OT)	14,485	notes
December 19, 2024	Sam Houston	31	Georgia Southern	26	13,151	notes
December 23, 2025	Western Kentucky	27	Southern Miss	16	16,693	notes

- The 2005 game was played at Cajun Field in Lafayette, Louisiana, due to damage to the Superdome by Hurricane Katrina.
- Louisiana-Lafayette vacated all 9 wins from 2011, including the New Orleans Bowl, and vacated 8 wins from 2013, including the New Orleans Bowl, due to major NCAA violations including ACT fraud.
- Louisiana–Lafayette has been known simply as Louisiana since the 2017 season.

== MVPs ==
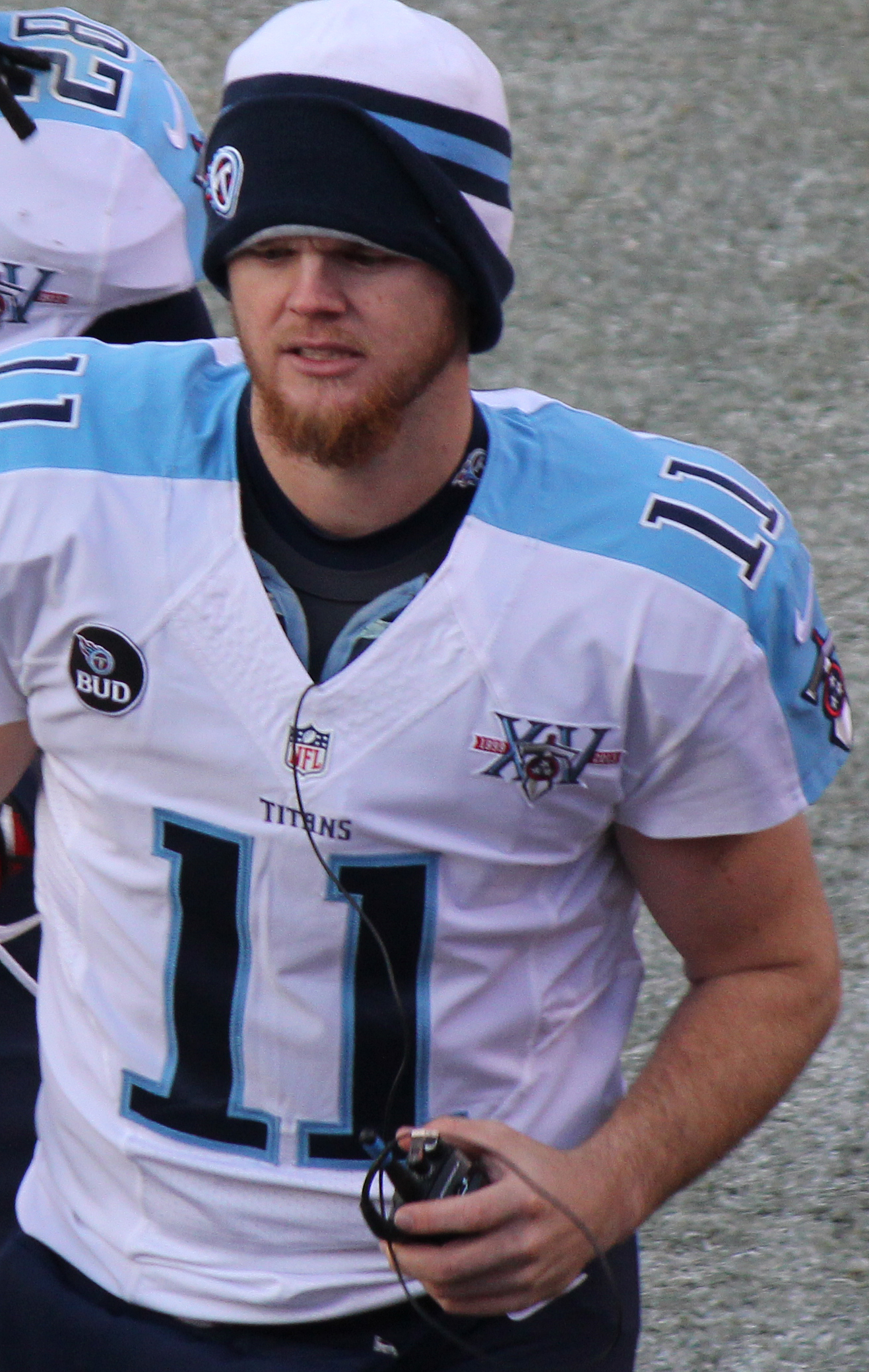
2007 MVP Rusty Smith

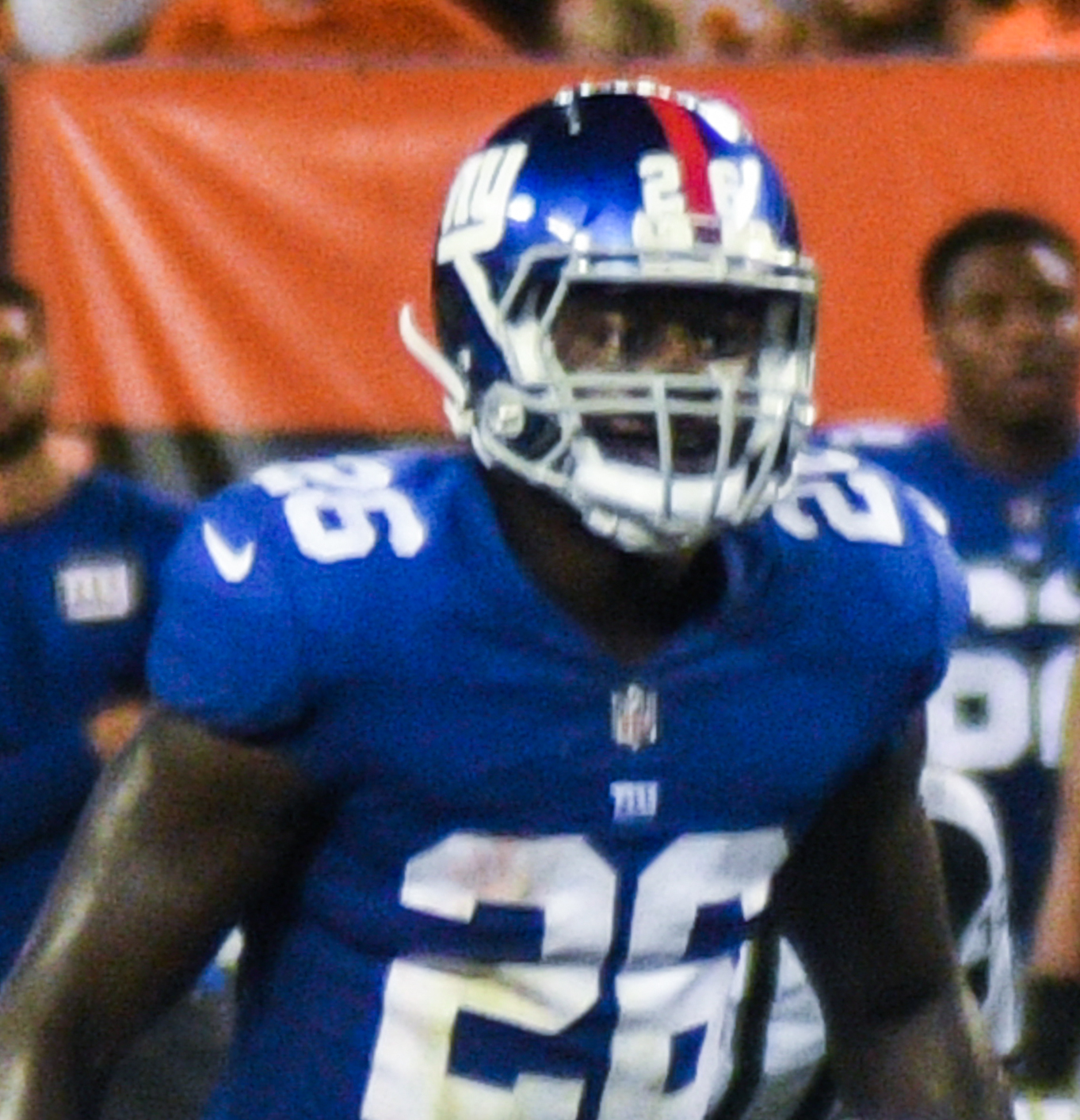
2013 MVP Orleans Darkwa

Year	MVP	Team	Position
2001	Justin Gallimore	Colorado State	DB^{(D)}
2002	Kevin Galbreath	North Texas	RB
2003	Danny Wimprine	Memphis	QB
2004	Michael Boley	Southern Miss	LB^{(D)}
2005	Shawn Nelson	Southern Miss	TE
2006	Omar Haugabook	Troy	QB
2007	Rusty Smith	Florida Atlantic	QB
2008	Austin Davis	Southern Miss	QB
2009	Dwight Dasher	Middle Tennessee	QB
2010	Corey Robinson	Troy	QB
2011	Blaine Gautier	Louisiana-Lafayette‡	QB
2012	Terrance Broadway	Louisiana-Lafayette	QB
2013	Orleans Darkwa	Tulane†	RB
2014	Terrance Broadway	Louisiana-Lafayette	QB
2015	Kenneth Dixon	Louisiana Tech	RB
2016	Allenzae Staggers	Southern Miss	WR
2017	Brandon Silvers	Troy	QB
2018	Zac Thomas	Appalachian State	QB
2019	Darrynton Evans	Appalachian State	RB
2020	Shai Werts	Georgia Southern	QB
2021	Levi Lewis	Louisiana	QB
2022	Austin Reed	Western Kentucky	QB
2023	Ron Wiggins	Jacksonville State	RB
2024	Jaylon Jimmerson	Sam Houston	DB^{(D)}
2025	Maverick McIvor	Western Kentucky	QB

^{(D)} MVP was a defensive player
† MVP's team did not win the game
‡ MVP's team later vacated its victory

== Most appearances ==
Updated through the December 2025 edition (25 games, 50 total appearances).

Teams with multiple appearances

Rank	Team	Appearances	Record
1	Louisiana	7	3–2*
2	Southern Miss	6	4–2
3	North Texas	5	1–4
4	Troy	4	3–1
5	Appalachian State	2	2–0
5	Western Kentucky	2	2–0
5	Georgia Southern	2	1–1
5	Louisiana Tech	2	1–1
5	Memphis	2	1–1
5	Middle Tennessee	2	1–1
5	Arkansas State	2	0–2

* Louisiana's record excludes two vacated victories. The school was known as Louisiana–Lafayette prior to the 2017 season.

Teams with a single appearance

Won (4): Colorado State, Florida Atlantic, Jacksonville State, Sam Houston
Lost (10): Cincinnati, East Carolina, Marshall, Nevada, Ohio, Rice, San Diego State, South Alabama, Tulane, UAB

== Appearances by conference ==
Updated through the December 2025 edition (25 games, 50 total appearances).

Conference	Record				Appearances by season		
Conference	Games	W	L	Win pct.	Won	Lost	Vacated
Sun Belt	25	12	11	.522	2002, 2006, 2007, 2009, 2010, 2012, 2014, 2017, 2018, 2019, 2020, 2021	2001, 2003, 2004, 2005, 2008, 2015, 2016, 2022, 2023, 2024, 2025	2011, 2013
CUSA	21	10	11	.476	2003, 2004, 2005, 2008, 2015, 2016, 2022, 2023, 2024, 2025	2002, 2006, 2007, 2009, 2012, 2013, 2017, 2018, 2019, 2020, 2021	
Mountain West	3	1	2	.333	2001	2011, 2014	
MAC	1	0	1	.000		2010	

Note: Two vacated victories are excluded from the Sun Belt Conference's win–loss record and winning percentage.

== Game records ==
Team	Performance vs. Opponent	Year
Most points scored	50, Troy vs. North Texas	2017
Fewest points allowed	3, shared by: Louisiana–Lafayette vs. Nevada; Louisiana Tech vs. Georgia Southern	2014; 2020
Margin of victory	35, Georgia Southern vs. Louisiana Tech	2020
First downs	31, Jacksonville State vs. Louisiana	2023
Rushing yards	322, Georgia Southern vs. Louisiana Tech	2020
Passing yards	522, Western Kentucky vs. South Alabama	2022
All-purpose yards	791, Louisiana Tech vs. Arkansas State	2015
Most points scored (losing team)	34, Louisiana–Lafayette vs. East Carolina	2012
Most points scored (both teams)	80, Troy vs. North Texas	2017
Fewest yards allowed	232, Louisiana Tech vs. Georgia Southern	2020
Fewest rushing yards allowed	-8, Troy vs. North Texas	2017
Fewest passing yards allowed	95, Southern Miss vs. Louisiana–Lafayette	2016
Individual	Player, Team	Year
Points scored	24, Kenneth Dixon (Louisiana Tech)	2015
Passing touchdowns	5, Rusty Smith (Florida Atlantic)	2007
Rushing yards	201, Dwight Dasher (Middle Tennessee)	2009
Passing yards	497, Austin Reed (Western Kentucky)	2022
Receiving yards	230, Allenzae Staggers (Southern Miss)	2016
All-purpose yards	283, Darryl Surgent (Louisiana–Lafayette)	2011
Receptions	11, shared by: Allenzae Staggers (Southern Miss); Damion Willis (Troy); Devin Voisin (South Alabama); Malachi Corley (Western Kentucky)	2016; 2017; 2022; 2022
Touchdowns (all-purpose)	4, Kenneth Dixon (Louisiana Tech)	2015
Rushing touchdowns	3, shared by: Orleans Darkwa (Tulane); Shai Werts (Georgia Southern); Rasheen Ali (Marshall)	2013; 2020; 2021
Receiving touchdowns	3, shared by: Teblarus Gill (Troy); Colin Lockett (San Diego State)	2010; 2011
Tackles	18, K.C. Ossai (Louisiana)	2023
Sacks	3.0, Ja’Boree Poole (Southern Miss)	2016
Interceptions	2, shared by: Elbert Mack (Troy); Sean Thomas (Louisiana–Lafayette); Reed Blankenship (Middle Tennessee); Justin Birdsong (Georgia Southern); Jaylon Jimmerson (Sam Houston)	2006; 2013; 2018; 2020; 2024
Long Plays	Record, Player, Team vs. Opponent	Year
Touchdown run	68 yds., Alonzo Harris (Louisiana–Lafayette)	2012
Touchdown pass	65 yds., Shai Werts (Georgia Southern)	2020
Kickoff return	98 yds., Blaise Taylor (Arkansas State)	2015
Punt return	87 yds., Darryl Surgent (Louisiana–Lafayette)	2011
Interception return	82 yds., Corey Trim (Louisiana–Lafayette)	2013
Fumble return	56 yds., Colton McDonald (North Texas)	2017
Punt	70 yds., Jarre Humphrey (Memphis)	2007
Field goal	50 yds., shared by: Michael Taylor (Troy); Brett Baer (Louisiana–Lafayette); Jonathan Barnes (Louisiana Tech)	2010; 2011, 2012; 2015

== Media coverage ==
The bowl has been carried on ESPN2 or ESPN since inception.
