= List of vacated games in NCAA Division I FBS football =

The following is a list of games ordered vacated by the National Collegiate Athletic Association (NCAA) in the NCAA Division I Football Bowl Subdivision (formerly Division I-A). The list does not include forfeits imposed as a result of NCAA sanctions or wins from FCS, Division II, or Division III football.

As a private association, the NCAA only changes its own records to reflect forfeits or vacations that its own Committee on Infractions has ordered, and not for sanctions imposed by individual conferences.

== Most games vacated ==
Currently, the record for most wins currently recognized as vacated by the NCAA is the 37 wins vacated by LSU football as a result of Vadal Alexander being ineligible for his entire college career.

Historically, the most wins ever vacated by a team at any point in time is the 112 wins vacated by Penn State football as a result of the Penn State child sex abuse scandal. These wins were later restored to Penn State’s record in 2015 as a result of a settlement.

In addition to vacating and forfeiting games, the NCAA has the power to issue other forms of sanctions. The harshest sanction is a ban on a school's competing in a sport for at least one year. Sometimes referred to as the NCAA's death penalty, this sanction has been imposed once against an FBS college football program: SMU football for the 1987 season as a result of the Southern Methodist University football scandal.

== Vacated games ==
School	Coach	Year	Actual W–L	Adjusted W–L	Games Affected
Alabama	Mike Shula	2005	10–2	0–2	Vacated 9 regular season wins and 2006 Cotton Bowl Classic win
Alabama	Mike Shula	2006	6–7	0–7	Vacated 6 regular season wins
Alabama	Nick Saban	2007	7–6	2–6	Vacated 5 regular season wins
Arizona State	Herm Edwards	2021	8–5	0–5	Vacated 8 regular season wins
Arizona State	Herm Edwards	2022	3–9	1–9	Vacated 2 regular season wins
Arkansas State	Steve Roberts	2005	6–6	2–6	Vacated 4 regular season wins
Arkansas State	Steve Roberts	2006	6–6	0–6	Vacated 6 regular season wins
California	Tom Holmoe	1999	4–7	0–7	Vacated 4 regular season wins
FIU	Don Strock	2005	5–6	0–6	Vacated 5 regular season wins
Florida State	Bobby Bowden	2006	7–6	2–6	Vacated 4 regular season wins and 2006 Emerald Bowl
Florida State	Bobby Bowden	2007	7–6	0–6	Vacated 7 regular season wins
Georgia Tech	Paul Johnson	2009	11–3	10–3	Vacated 2009 ACC Championship Game win
Iowa	Kirk Ferentz	2023	10–4	6–4	Vacated 4 regular season wins
Kentucky	Mark Stoops	2021	10–3	0–3	Vacated 9 regular season wins and 2022 Citrus Bowl win
Louisiana	Mark Hudspeth	2011	9–4	1–4	Vacated 7 regular season wins and 2011 New Orleans Bowl win
Louisiana	Mark Hudspeth	2012	9–4	5–4	Vacated 4 regular season wins
Louisiana	Mark Hudspeth	2013	9–4	1–4	Vacated 7 regular season wins and 2013 New Orleans Bowl win
Louisiana	Mark Hudspeth	2014	9–4	7–4	Vacated 2 regular season wins
LSU	Les Miles	2012	10–3	0–3	Vacated 10 regular season wins
LSU	Les Miles	2013	10–3	0–3	Vacated 9 regular season wins and 2014 Outback Bowl win
LSU	Les Miles	2014	8–5	0–5	Vacated 8 regular season wins
LSU	Les Miles	2015	9–3	0–3	Vacated 8 regular season wins and 2015 Texas Bowl win
Michigan State	Mel Tucker	2022	5–7	0–7	Vacated 5 regular season wins
Michigan State	Mel Tucker (first two games); Harlon Barnett (interim)	2023	4–8	0–8	Vacated 4 regular season wins
Michigan State	Jonathan Smith	2024	5–7	0–7	Vacated 5 regular season wins
Missouri	Gary Pinkel	2015	5–7	0–7	Vacated 5 regular season wins
Missouri	Barry Odom	2016	4–8	0–8	Vacated 4 regular season wins
North Carolina	Butch Davis	2008	8–5	0–5	Vacated 8 regular season wins
North Carolina	Butch Davis	2009	8–5	0–5	Vacated 8 regular season wins
Notre Dame	Brian Kelly	2012	12–1	0–0	Vacated 12 regular season wins and 2013 BCS National Championship Game loss
Notre Dame	Brian Kelly	2013	9–4	0–4	Vacated 8 regular season wins and 2013 Pinstripe Bowl win
Ohio State	Jim Tressel	2010	12–1	0–1	Vacated 11 regular season wins and 2011 Sugar Bowl win. See Ohio State University football scandal.
Ole Miss	Houston Nutt	2010	4–8	0–8	Vacated 4 regular season wins
Ole Miss	Houston Nutt	2011	2–10	0–10	Vacated 2 regular season wins
Ole Miss	Hugh Freeze	2012	7–6	0–6	Vacated 6 regular season wins and 2013 BBVA Compass Bowl win
Ole Miss	Hugh Freeze	2013	8–5	1–5	Vacated 7 regular season wins
Ole Miss	Hugh Freeze	2014	9–4	1–4	Vacated 8 regular season wins
Ole Miss	Hugh Freeze	2016	5–7	0–7	Vacated 5 regular season wins
SMU	Mike Cavan	1998	5–7	1–1	Vacated 4 regular season wins and 6 regular season losses
Syracuse	Paul Pasqualoni	2004	6–6	0–6	Vacated 6 regular season wins
Syracuse	Greg Robinson	2005	1–10	0–10	Vacated 1 regular season win
Syracuse	Greg Robinson	2006	4–8	0–8	Vacated 4 regular season wins
Tennessee	Jeremy Pruitt	2019	8–5	0–5	Vacated 7 regular season wins and 2020 Gator Bowl win
Tennessee	Jeremy Pruitt	2020	3–7	0–7	Vacated 3 regular season wins
USC	Pete Carroll	2004	13–0	11–0	Vacated 1 regular season win and 2005 Orange Bowl win. See University of Southern California athletics scandal.
USC	Pete Carroll	2005	12–1	0–0	Vacated 12 regular season wins and 2006 Rose Bowl loss. See University of Southern California athletics scandal.

== See also ==
- Death penalty (NCAA)
