= 2013 New Orleans Bowl =

2013 R+L Carriers New Orleans Bowl
- Louisiana–Lafayette win vacated by the NCAA in 2016
Tulane Green Wave	Louisiana Ragin' Cajuns
(7–5)	(8–4)
C-USA	Sun Belt
21	24
Head coach: Curtis Johnson	Head coach: Mark Hudspeth
	1	2	3	4	Total
Tulane	0	14	7	0	21
Louisiana	14	7	0	3	24
- Date: December 21, 2013
- Season: 2013
- Stadium: Mercedes-Benz Superdome
- Location: New Orleans, Louisiana
- MVP: Orleans Darkwa (RB, Tulane)
- Referee: David Witvoet (Big Ten)
- Attendance: 54,728
- Payout: US$500,000

United States TV coverage
- Network: ESPN/ESPN Radio
- Announcers: TV: Mike Patrick (play-by-play), Ed Cunningham (analyst), Jeannine Edwards (sideline); Radio: Bill Rosinski (play-by-play), David Norrie (analyst), and Joe Schad (sideline reporter).

The 2013 New Orleans Bowl was an American college football bowl game that was played on December 21, 2013, at the Mercedes-Benz Superdome in New Orleans, Louisiana. The thirteenth edition of the New Orleans Bowl, it featured the Tulane Green Wave of Conference USA against the Louisiana Ragin' Cajuns of the Sun Belt Conference. The game began at 8:00 p.m. CST and aired on ESPN. It was one of the 2013–14 bowl games that concluded the 2013 FBS football season. Sponsored by freight shipping company R+L Carriers, the game was officially known as the R+L Carriers New Orleans Bowl. The Ragin' Cajuns defeated the Green Wave by a score of 24–21.

In March 2016, Louisiana–Lafayette vacated its 2011 and 2013 New Orleans Bowl wins, due to major NCAA violations including ACT exam fraud and payments to recruits.

== Teams ==
The Ragin' Cajuns accepted their invitation after earning an 8–3 record in their first eleven games of the season, going on to finish at 8–4 (5–2 Sun Belt). The Green Wave had a regular season record of 7–5 (5–3 C-USA). Despite the Superdome being the Green Wave's home venue, the Ragin' Cajuns are set to be the designated home team, as they are from the Sun Belt Conference.

=== Tulane Green Wave ===
2013 was the Green Wave's most successful season in over a decade, finishing at 7–5 overall and 5–3 in Conference USA. At the season's conclusion, bowl director Billy Ferrante extended an invitation to play in the game. This will be the Green Wave's first New Orleans Bowl, as well as their first bowl game of any kind since the 2002 Hawaii Bowl, which saw them defeat the Hawaii Warriors by a score of 36–28 at Aloha Stadium. It will also be the Green Wave's final game as a member of Conference USA before moving to the American Athletic Conference for 2014, as well as their final game in the Superdome before moving to the on-campus Yulman Stadium for 2014.

==== Offense ====
Second-year head coach Curtis Johnson led the Green Wave into the game with a statistically lackluster offense that ranked near the bottom of the Football Bowl Subdivision in passing yards, averaging only 176.1 per game, rushing yards, averaging only 128.1 per game, and points scored, averaging only 25.1 per game. Their mediocre passing game was led by Nick Montana, the son of NFL-great Joe Montana, who played his redshirt freshman and freshman season at University of Washington and his sophomore season at Mt. San Antonio College before transferring to Tulane, at which he was named the team's starter over Devin Powell, who played during the season when Montana sustained a separated right shoulder in October, prior to the season's first game. The two-pronged rushing game included senior running back Orleans Darkwa, who rushed for 780 yards and 9 touchdowns during the regular season, and junior running back Rob Kelley, who rushed for 422 yards and 3 touchdowns during the regular season.

Ryan Grant, who was on the preseason Biletnikoff Award watchlist, saw his 2013 season numbers decline from 2012, but still managed to record 70 receptions, 926 yards, and 9 touchdowns, highlighted by a 14-reception, 187-yard, 2-touchdown performance in the Green Wave's second game, a loss at the hands of South Alabama. Other prominent receivers included junior wideout Justyn Shackleford (34 regular season receptions), and sophomore wideout Xavier Rush, freshman wideout Kedrick Banks, and Kelley, the latter three of whom each recorded 17 regular season receptions. Sophomore tight end Sydie London was not much of a threat in the passing game (12 receptions in 12 games), but he was one of just two tight ends on the roster, so was almost a starter by default, though at one spring practice, did impress New Orleans Saints wide receiver Marques Colston, who thought he was one of the best players on the team. Tulane's offensive line was a much maligned group throughout the season. By the end of the season, they were ravaged by injury, and hindered both the running and passing games. The 2012 winner of the Lou Groza Award, senior kicker Cairo Santos, handled the kicking for the Green Wave, but regressed from being a perfect 21/21 to going 16/22, though he did have a long of 56 yards.

==== Defense ====
Tulane's defense, which featured a 3–4 defensive scheme, fared better during the regular season than the offense. They ranked 22nd in the nation in scoring defense, surrendering only 21.2 points per game. They allowed 354.3 yards per game; of that 234.3 was in the passing game and 120 in the running game. The defensive line was anchored by Royce LaFrance, who recorded 6.5 sacks, tied for third in Conference USA. The other defensive end slot was occupied by Julius Warmsley, who recorded 41 tackles, and 4 sacks. The duo helped provide consistent pressure on opposing quarterbacks. Supplementing the ends' pass rush was reserve end Tyler Gilbert, who added three sacks. Augmenting the defensive ends was defensive tackle Chris Davenport (15 tackles, 1.5 sacks), who transferred from LSU prior to the season. Tulane also had a veteran core of linebackers, comprising seniors Zach Davis, who led the corps with 78 tackles, Darryl Farley, who recorded 62 tackles, as well as contributors senior Kyle Davis, freshman Nico Marley, and junior Taylor Bullock.

The defensive backs also contributed to the team's defensive success, with Lorenzo Doss recording seven interceptions, tied for the best in the conference. Safety Darion Monroe led the entire defense in tackles, with 96; he also recovered three fumbles during the season. Derrick Strozier and Jordan Sullen also contributed at cornerback, recording two interceptions apiece, as did Ryan Travis, who was fourth on the team with 53 tackles. Jordan Batiste played a roving position in the secondary, but was a major contributor, as were Sam Scofield, a cornerback, and Shakiel Smith, a safety.

=== Louisiana–Lafayette Ragin' Cajuns ===
The Ragin' Cajuns continued their recent winning ways in 2013, clinching at least a share of the Sun Belt Conference championship once again with a 5–1 conference and an 8–3 overall record. After losing to the Louisiana–Monroe Warhawks for only the team's third loss of the season (and first in-conference), bowl director Billy Ferrante extended an invitation to play in the game. This will be the Ragin' Cajuns third consecutive New Orleans Bowl, having won the previous two; the first being in 2011 where they defeated the San Diego State Aztecs by a score of 32–30, and the second being in 2012 where they defeated the East Carolina Pirates by a score of 43–34. The Ragin' Cajuns are only the second team to play in three consecutive New Orleans Bowls, joining the North Texas Mean Green who participated in the first four editions of the game, finishing with a 1–3 record. The Ragin' Cajuns began their season on a two-game losing streak, then won eight consecutive games, and then lost their final two.

==== Offense ====
The Ragin' Cajuns' spread offense attack was coordinated by Jay Johnson. Junior Terrance Broadway played quarterback, and finished the regular season fifth in the Sun Belt in passing yards with 2276, third in passing touchdowns with 19, and led the conference with a 157.0 passer rating. Late in the season, Broadway broke his right throwing arm, and subsequently underwent surgery, however coach Mark Hudspeth was "optimistic" he would return for the bowl game. Freshman Brooks Haack was the backup. A pair of backs led a "solid running back tandem" that Ragin' Cajuns' rushing attack – junior Alonzo Harris and freshman Elijah McGuire each exceeded 800 rushing yards, however McGuire did so averaging 8.9 yards per carry, whereas Harris averaged 4.7 yards per carry (Harris had 186 carries to McGuire's 92). Broadway also contributed to the rushing attack, attaining 421 yards on 117 carries. Harris had 13 touchdowns, McGuire had 7, and Broadway had 8.

A trio of wide receivers anchored the Louisiana-Lafayette receiving game. 6 feet 4 inches (1.93 m) junior Jamal Robinson was by far Broadway's favorite target, leading the team with 50 receptions, 812 yards, and 8 touchdowns, senior Darryl Surgent was second on the team with 29 receptions, 398 yards, and 5 touchdowns, and junior James Butler was third on the team 26 receptions and 363 yards, however he had only one touchdown. Senior Jacob Maxwell started at tight end, and reeled in 12 passes for 158 yards and 2 touchdowns on the season. McGuire and fellow running back sophomore Effrem Reed also contributed in the receiving game. Junior college transfer Stephen Brauchle, who began his college career at Mississippi Gulf Coast Community College, teamed with walk-on holder Jake Guidry to handle the kicking duties for the Ragin' Cajuns; he made 8 of 13 field goal attempts with a long of 38 yards, and was 51 of 53 on extra point attempts. The offensive line was composed of brothers Daniel and Mykhael Quave, who started at right guard and left tackle respectively (Mykhael transitioned to tackle after playing at guard his freshman season), senior center Andre Huval, sophomore right tackle Octravian Anderson, and junior left guard Terry Johnson.

==== Defense ====
The Ragin' Cajuns defense, led by new coordinator James Willis, was led by one of "the league's best linebackers", Justin Anderson, who recorded a team-leading 123 total tackles, and 10 TFL, second on the team. Joining him in the linebacking corps was undersized (5 feet 11 inches (1.80 m) 188 pounds (85 kg)) sophomore Chris Hill, whose 37 tackles were eighth on the team, but who sustained an injury late in the season and was questionable for the bowl game, junior Darius Barksdale, who played in only seven games, and recorded 28 total tackles, sophomore Dominque Tovell, who though listed as a defensive end, played linebacker, and finished second on the team with 64 tackles, and led the team with 12 TFL. Much to his shock, even freshman safety Al Riles saw time at linebacker due to injury depletion by the end of the season. On the defensive line, junior Justin Hamilton started at nose tackle, and totaled 37 tackles, 8 TFL, and 3 sacks, junior Christian Ringo was the predominant starter at defensive end, totaling 15 tackles, 2 TFL, and 1 sack, and senior defensive tackle Brandon McCray, who totaled 13 tackles and 2 TFL. In the secondary, Trevence Patt achieved second team all-conference recognition, totaling 41 tackles. Other starters included Corey Trim, T. J. Worthy, and Sean Thomas.

== Game summary ==
=== First quarter ===
Tulane received the opening kickoff, and went three-and-out. Louisiana-Lafayette (ULL) took the field with Terrance Broadway at quarterback (there was question due to his injury as to whether he would start), however they rotated him with Jalen Nixon, but it was Broadway who was in the game when Elijah McGuire rushed for a 27-yard touchdown, ruled such after video review. After Nick Montana started the first drive, redshirt freshman Devin Powell entered the game on Tulane's second drive, but failed to have any success, for another three-and-out. Tulane's defense got a stop on their next drive, highlighted by Nico Marley (grandson of Bob Marley) recording a tackle for loss on third and short, forcing a punt. Montana returned for Tulane on their next drive, during which they achieved their first first down of the game. However, later in the drive, on an end around wide receiver pass, Ryan Grant's pass intended for Justyn Shackleford was intercepted, setting up the Ragin Cajuns for an offensive drive during which they drove down the field, taking advantage of a personal foul late hit that put them in the red zone and subsequently allowed Alonzo Harris to rush for a 15-yard touchdown, the final score of the first quarter.

=== Second quarter ===
Early in the second quarter, while in the red zone, Montana threw an interception to Corey Trim, who returned it for an 82-yard touchdown, giving ULL a 21–0 lead. Devin Powell subsequently replaced Montana. After each team went three-and-out, Tulane scored its first points, a 1-yard touchdown run by Orleans Darkwa that culminated a 9-play, 71 yard drive that encapsulated 4:43. ULL got the ball back, however Broadway threw an interception, setting up Tulane. On their first play, Powell threw a 49-yard pass to Ryan Grant who, amidst double coverage and despite a pass interference penalty, leaped and made the catch. After a pass interference penalty, Darkwa ran for a 7-yard touchdown, pulling the Green Wave within seven points. Not wanting to turn the ball over, the Ragin' Cajuns rushed on each play of their drive to get into the half, at which the score was 21–14, Louisiana-Lafayette.

=== Third quarter ===
The teams exchanged punts to start the half. On Louisiana-Lafayette's second drive, Tulane lost tackle Chris Davenport and cornerback Lorenzo Doss to injury; both went to the locker room. Nevertheless, Tulane's defense forced another punt, but their offense failed to capitalize, burning a timeout, and punting back to the Ragin' Cajuns. Tulane's defense sustained another injury on ULL's next drive; senior defensive back Jordan Sullen was carted off the field after being kicked in the head during the course of the run on a screen pass that converted a second-and-long; he left the field on a backboard, however he stood up and hobbled to the backboard, thus alleviating concern of paralysis, which had happened to Tulane the previous season. Sullen was transported to Tulane Medical Center as a precaution, however was expected to make a full recovery. Meanwhile, Doss returned to the game, and on the next play, Broadway threw an interception to cornerback Derrick Strozier, setting up Tulane in the red zone; they scored via a Darkwa touchdown run on the first play of their ensuing drive, tying the game at 21. ULL again failed to execute offensively, and went three-and-out. At the end of the third quarter, the game was tied at 21.

=== Fourth quarter ===
Louisiana-Lafayette stopped Tulane's offensive momentum early in the quarter, forcing a punt. On ULL's ensuing drive, they were faced with a third down a six, and threw an incomplete pass, however a pass interference call gave them a first down, which energized the Ragin' Cajuns temporarily, but they ultimately punted, pinning Tulane inside the five yard line, from which, while under pressure, Powell threw the ball up in the air, and it was intercepted, setting ULL up with excellent field position, particularly when they went half the distance to the goal after a dead ball personal foul penalty on Tulane. ULL had an opportunity to score a touchdown, however after Broadway slipped during a run while in the open field on third down, ultimately going down due to cramps, and forcing Hunter Stover, a linebacker turned place kicker, attempted his first-ever college field goal, a 27-yard kick that he made, stopping Tulane's streak of 21 unanswered points. Tulane subsequently took the field and converted a first down, and failed to convert a third down at the 40-yard line, after which they decided to punt rather than test Santos's field goal range. Jalen Nixon took the field at quarterback on ULL's drive after Broadway went to the locker room for fluids. On back-to-back runs, Harris rushed for a first down, and then Nixon rushed for a first down, giving the Ragin' Cajuns momentum prior to beginning to try to work the clock. Faced with a third and ten and under duress, Nixon found an open receiver to convert the third down. Later in the drive, Strozier went down due to cramps, exiting the game. With 1:42, ULL was forced to punt after Scofield made an open field tackle to keep ULL out of field goal range, after which coach Curtis Johnson called timeout. Tulane got the ball at the five-yard line with 1:35 and one timeout to try to start a drive to tie or win the game, however after Powell threw two incomplete passes at the ground, they were faced with a third and long; Powell escaped pressure in the end zone, and ultimately threw the ball up in the air and Shackleford reeled it in for a first down out to around the 40-yard line. Two plays later, Powell threw a 27-yard pass to Grant, putting Tulane in Santos's field goal range. With 24 seconds and a timeout, Tulane had the ball at the 25-yard line, but Powell took a sack at the 31-yard line, forcing Tulane to burn their final timeout with 13 seconds left. Santos subsequently came out to try a 48-yard field goal, but ULL tried to ice him by calling a timeout; after the timeout, Santos missed the field goal wide, winning the game for ULL.

=== Scoring summary ===
Scoring summary

Quarter	Time	Drive			Team	Scoring information	Score	
Quarter	Time	Plays	Yards	TOP	Team	Scoring information	Tulane	Louisiana–Lafayette
1	10:57	6	64	3:00	ULL	Elijah McGuire 27-yard touchdown run, Hunter Stover kick good	0	7
1	2:10	6	73	2:50	ULL	Alonzo Harris 15-yard touchdown run, Stephen Brauchle kick good	0	14
2	12:31	-	-	-	ULL	Interception returned 82 yards for touchdown by Corey Trim, Stover kick good	0	21
2	3:55	9	71	4:43	TUL	Orleans Darkwa 1-yard touchdown run, Cairo Santos kick good	7	21
2	1:58	2	65	0:33	TUL	Darkwa 7-yard touchdown run, Santos kick good	14	21
3	2:34	1	17	0:06	TUL	Darkwa 22-yard touchdown run, Santos kick good	21	21
4	9:56	4	3	1:08	ULL	27-yard field goal by Stover	21	24
"TOP" = time of possession. For other American football terms, see Glossary of American football.							21	24
