= Vadal Alexander =

American football player (born 1994)

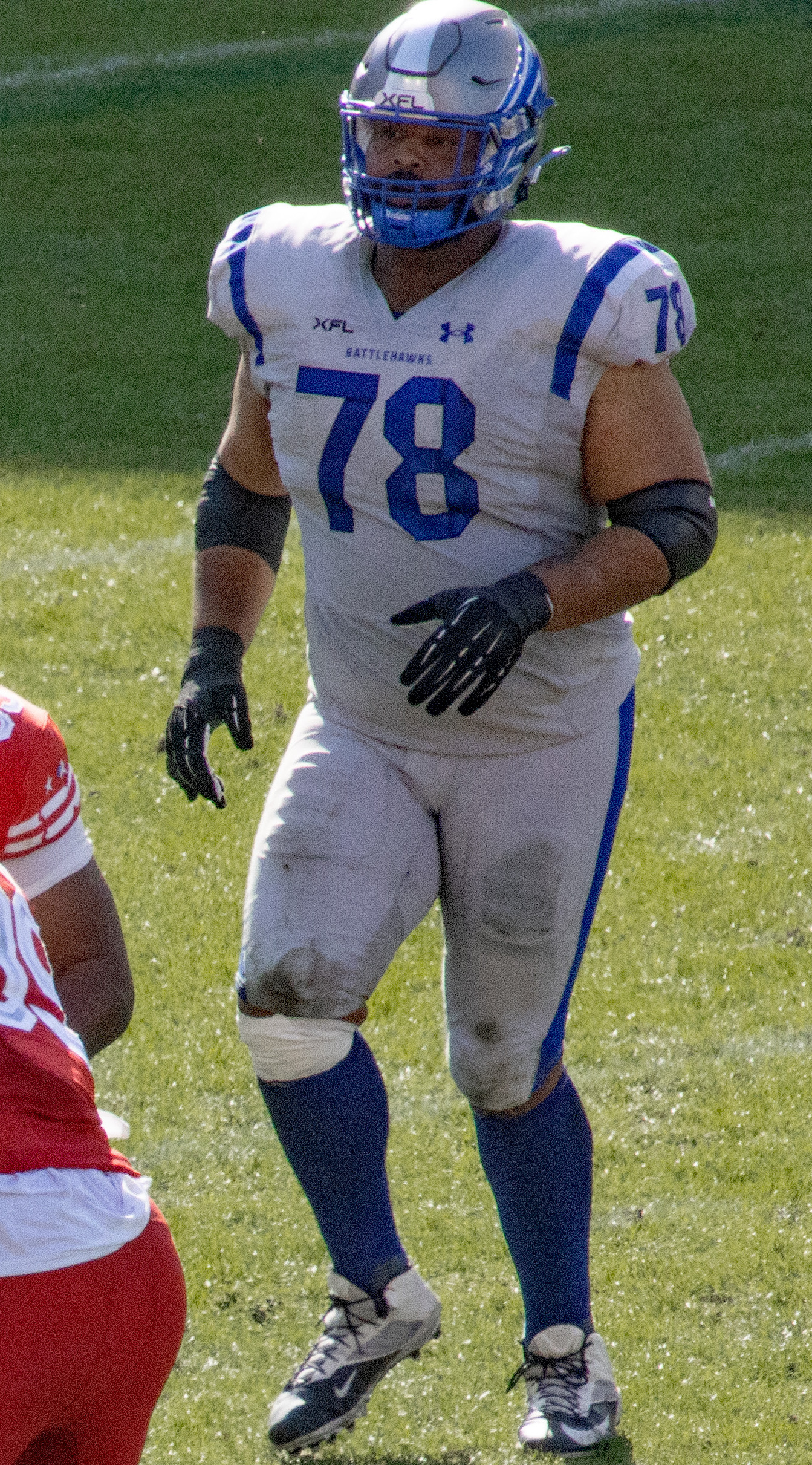
- Alexander with the St. Louis Battlehawks in 2023

No. 74, 78
- Position: Guard

Personal information
- Born: March 23, 1994 (age 32); New Orleans, Louisiana, U.S.
- Listed height: 6 ft 5 in (1.96 m)
- Listed weight: 325 lb (147 kg)

Career information
- High school: Buford (Buford, Georgia)
- College: LSU (2012–2015)
- NFL draft: 2016: 7th round, 234th overall pick

Career history
- Oakland Raiders (2016–2017); Pittsburgh Maulers (2022); St. Louis Battlehawks (2023–2024)

Awards and highlights
- Second-team All-American (2015); First-team All-SEC (2015); Second-team All-SEC (2014)

Career NFL statistics
- Games played: 24
- Games started: 9
- Stats at Pro Football Reference

Vadal Alexander (born March 23, 1994) is an American former professional football player who was a guard in the National Football League (NFL). He was selected by the Oakland Raiders in the seventh round of the 2016 NFL draft. Alexander played college football for four years with the LSU Tigers, but all their wins were vacated after he was determined to be ineligible because his father received embezzled funds from a booster.

== Early life ==
A native of Buford, Georgia, Alexander attended Buford High School, where he was a two-time Georgia AA First Team All-State offensive lineman as a junior and senior. In his senior season, the Buford Wolves went 14–1 and finished as GHSA Class AA runner-up, being upset in the state final by Calhoun. After his senior season, Alexander participated in the Under Armour All-America Game.

Regarded as a four-star recruit by Rivals.com, Alexander was ranked as the No. 11 offensive guard prospect in the class of 2012. Alexander chose Louisiana State over offers from Alabama, Auburn, Georgia Tech, and South Carolina.

== College career ==
In his true freshman year at Louisiana State University, Alexander played in 13 games. After an early season injury to starting left tackle Chris Faulk, Alexander moved into the starting line-up, playing every offensive snap of the final nine games at right tackle. He earned Freshman All-Southeastern Conference (SEC) honors by the league's coaches, and was named second team Freshman All-American by Scout.com. For his sophomore season, he replaced La'el Collins at left guard, who was moved over to left tackle. Alexander started all 13 games, and led the Tigers with 71 knockdowns on the season. In the Outback Bowl, he was on the field for 71 offensive plays and was credited with a career-high 13 knockdowns.

As a junior, Alexander remained a mainstay at left guard next to Collins as left tackle, giving LSU one of the most dominating guard-tackle combinations in college football. Running behind Collins and Alexander, freshman running back Leonard Fournette registered 1,034 rushing yards on the season. After LSU's 30–27 win over Florida, Alexander earned SEC Offensive Lineman of the Week honors. Alexander's streak of 32 straight starts snapped, however, when he missed the Arkansas game in week 11 because of a hand injury. Forgoing the option to enter the 2015 NFL draft, Alexander returned to LSU and was named Preseason First Team All-SEC. He was moved to right tackle, as previous right tackle Jerald Hawkins had to replace Collins on the left side.

It was reported in June 2019 that Alexander's father, James, received approximately $180,000 from John Paul Funes, an LSU booster convicted in federal court of wire fraud and money laundering after embezzling hundreds of thousands of dollars from his employer, Our Lady of the Lake hospitals. As a result, LSU vacated all 37 wins from when Alexander was on the team, the most by any school.

== Professional career ==
=== Pre-draft ===
Prior to his senior year, Alexander was considered one of the top senior prospects for the 2016 NFL draft. Alexander was invited to and played in the Senior Bowl in January 2016. Coming out of college, he was ranked as the second best offensive guard and projected to be selected in the second or third round. After the NFL Combine, Alexander was projected by the majority of analysts to be selected in the third or fourth round of the 2016 NFL draft and was ranked the seventh best offensive guard out of the 203 available by NFLDraftScout.com.

Pre-draft measurables
Height	Weight	Arm length	Hand span	40-yard dash	10-yard split	20-yard split	20-yard shuttle	Three-cone drill	Vertical jump	Broad jump	Bench press
6 ft 5 1/4 in (1.96 m)	326 lb (148 kg)	35 1/4 in (0.90 m)	10 1/2 in (0.27 m)	5.57 s	1.81 s	3.21 s	4.90 s	8.04 s	24 in (0.61 m)	7 ft 11 in (2.41 m)	25 reps
All values from NFL Combine

=== Oakland Raiders ===
Alexander was selected by the Oakland Raiders in the seventh round, 234th overall, in the 2016 NFL draft. Many analysts were surprised by his drastic fall in the draft, as the majority of them had him projected as a second or third round selection. They said the steep fall in his draft stock likely came from not testing well at the combine and being seen as a prospect who better shows his talents in games. Scouts and teams also had concerns about his weight and conditioning. On May 9, 2016, the Raiders signed him to a four-year, $2.41 million contract that includes a signing bonus of $76,846.

He started his rookie season as the backup right guard to veteran Gabe Jackson. Alexander made his regular season debut during the second game of the season in a loss against the Atlanta Falcons. On October 2, 2016, he made his first career start during a 28–27 victory over the Baltimore Ravens after starting right tackle Austin Howard was unable to play due to an ankle injury. Howard's backup. Menelik Watson, was unable to play after he suffered an hamstring injury and the Raider's third backup right tackle option, Matt McCants, was down with a knee injury. Alexander was called for three holding penalties and a false start. He also started at right tackle the following game, for a Raider's win 34–31 over the San Diego Chargers.

On December 4, 2016, Alexander started the game against the Buffalo Bills at tight end. He was used as an extra blocker on the opening drive, with the Raider's defeating the Bills 38–24. The next game, he had his first official career start at right guard against the Kansas City Chiefs after starting right guard Kelechi Osemele was unable to play due to an illness that was later verified to be kidney stones. After having trouble with the Chief's defense during the first three snaps, head coach Jack Del Rio replaced him with veteran Jon Feliciano. They later rotated at right guard throughout the 13–21 loss to Kansas City.

On May 1, 2018, Alexander was suspended the first four games of the regular season for violating the league's policy on performance-enhancing substances. He was waived by the Raiders on July 31, 2018, after failing to report to training camp.

=== Pittsburgh Maulers ===
Alexander was selected by the Pittsburgh Maulers of the United States Football League (USFL) in the 22nd round of the 2022 USFL draft. He was transferred to the team's inactive roster on May 6 with an arthritis flare-up. He was moved back to the active roster on May 14. He was transferred to the inactive roster again on May 20, but moved back to the active roster the next day. He became a free agent when his contract expired on December 31, 2022.

=== St. Louis Battlehawks ===
On January 1, 2023, Alexander was selected by the St. Louis Battlehawks of the XFL in the eighth round of the 2023 XFL Supplemental Draft. He re-signed with the team on January 23, 2024.
