= Orleans Darkwa =

American football player (born 1992)

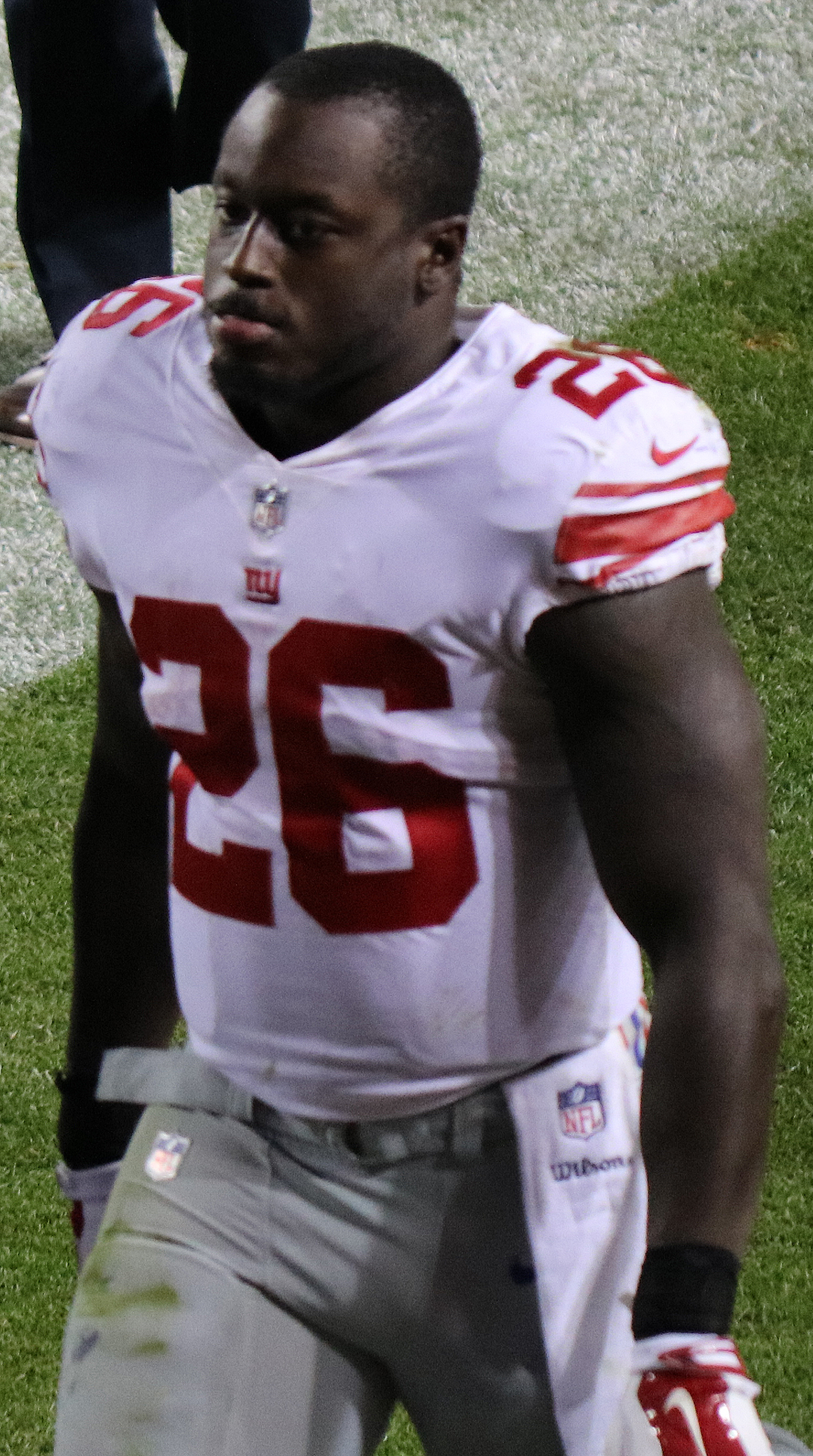
- Darkwa with the New York Giants in 2017

No. 32, 43, 26
- Position: Running back

Personal information
- Born: February 28, 1992 (age 34); Nashville, Tennessee, U.S.
- Listed height: 5 ft 11 in (1.80 m)
- Listed weight: 219 lb (99 kg)

Career information
- High school: The Ensworth School (Nashville)
- College: Tulane (2010–2013)
- NFL draft: 2014: undrafted

Career history
- Miami Dolphins (2014); New York Giants (2014–2017)

Awards and highlights
- 2× Second-team All-C-USA (2010, 2011)

Career NFL statistics
- Rushing yards: 1,038
- Rushing average: 4.2
- Rushing touchdowns: 9
- Receptions: 29
- Receiving yards: 207
- Stats at Pro Football Reference

Orleans Opoku-Darkwa (born February 28, 1992) is an American former professional football player who was a running back in the National Football League (NFL). He played college football for the Tulane Green Wave and was signed by the Miami Dolphins as an undrafted free agent in 2014. He also played for the New York Giants.

== Early life ==
Darkwa attended The Ensworth School, where he played high school football.

== College career ==
Darkwa played college football at Tulane University from 2010 to 2013 under head coaches Bob Toledo, Mark Hutson, and Curtis Johnson.

=== 2010 season ===
Darkwa immediately made an impact on the Green Wave running game getting a majority of the opportunities in their 4–8 season. In his first collegiate game, a 27–21 win over Southeastern Louisiana, Darkwa had 19 carries for 75 rushing yards and three rushing touchdowns. On October 23, in a 34–24 win over UTEP, he had 21 carries for 114 rushing yards and two touchdowns. In the next game, a 31–17 loss to SMU, he had a season-high 193 rushing yards on 29 carries. On November 6, against Southern Miss, he had 27 carries for 138 rushing yards and two rushing touchdowns in the 46–30 loss. In the following game, against Rice, he had 26 carries for 113 rushing yards and completed two passes for 43 yards and two touchdowns in the 54–49 victory. He followed that up with 20 carries for 129 rushing yards and a rushing touchdown in a 61–14 loss to the UCF. On November 27, against Marshall, he had 129 scrimmage yards and two rushing touchdowns in the 38–23 loss. Overall, in the 2010 season, he had 925 rushing yards, 11 rushing touchdowns, 17 receptions, 155 receiving yards, and had two passing touchdowns.

=== 2011 season ===
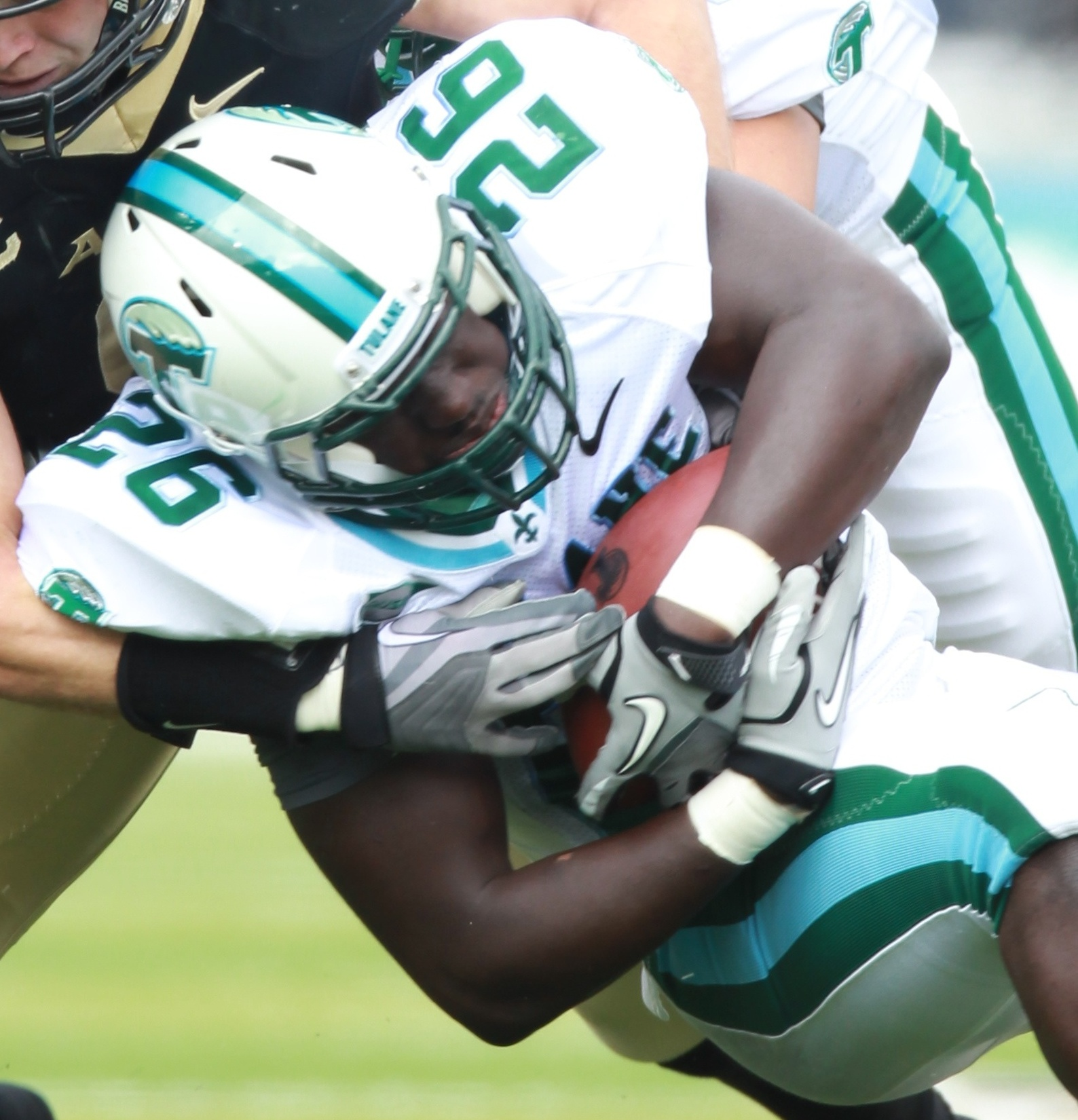
Darkwa with Tulane in 2011

Like the previous season, Darkwa had a majority of the rushing production for the Green Wave in their 2–11 season. On September 17, against UAB, he had two rushing touchdowns in the 49–10 victory. On October 1, against Army, he had 16 carries for 138 rushing yards and a rushing touchdown in the 45–6 loss. He followed that up with two more rushing touchdowns in the following game, a 37–34 loss to Syracuse. On October 22, against Memphis, he had 196 scrimmage yards sin the 33–17 loss. On October 10, against Houston, he had 21 carries for 123 rushing yards and two rushing touchdowns in the 73–17 loss. He closed out his season with two rushing touchdowns against Hawaii in the 35–23 loss. Overall, he finished the 2011 season with 924 rushing yards, 13 rushing touchdowns, 37 receptions, and 305 receiving yards.

=== 2012 season ===
In the 2012 season, Darkwa suffered through some regression due to an ankle injury sustained in the preseason. On October 27, he had his most productive game of the season against UAB with 20 carries for 74 yards and two rushing touchdowns to go along with three receptions for 20 yards in the 55–45 loss. On October 3, against Rice, he scored his only other touchdown of the season, a one-yard rush in the 49–47 loss. Overall, in the 2012 season, he finished with 241 rushing yards, three rushing touchdowns, 15 receptions, and 78 receiving yards as the Green Wave finished with a 2–10 record.

=== 2013 season ===
Darkwa returned to form in his final collegiate season. He had a majority of the carries for the Green Wave in their 7–6 season. In the season opener against Jackson State, he had two rushing touchdowns in the 34–7 victory. In the next game, against South Alabama, he had two rushing touchdowns in the 41–39 loss. On September 28, against Louisiana–Monroe, he had 17 carries for 118 rushing yards and a rushing touchdown in the 31–14 victory. On November 9, against UTSA, he had 20 carries for 103 rushing yards and a rushing touchdown in the 10–7 loss. On November 23, against UTEP, he had 17 carries for 137 rushing yards and a rushing touchdown in the 45–3 victory. In the final game of his collegiate career, the 2013 New Orleans Bowl, Darkwa rushed 16 times for 83 yards and three touchdowns in the 24–21 loss to Louisiana–Lafayette, and was named bowl MVP despite Tulane losing the game. In his final collegiate season, he had 863 rushing yards, 12 rushing touchdowns, eight receptions, and 57 receiving yards. During his collegiate career, he rushed for 2,953 yards on 663 carries and 39 touchdowns.

=== Collegiate statistics ===
Year	School	G	Rushing				Receiving			
Year	School	G	Att	Yds	Avg	TD	Rec	Yds	Avg	TD
2010	Tulane	11	184	925	5.0	11	17	155	9.1	0
2011	Tulane	13	210	924	4.4	13	37	305	8.2	0
2012	Tulane	9	81	241	3.0	3	15	78	5.2	0
2013	Tulane	13	188	863	4.6	12	8	57	7.1	0
Career		46	663	2,953	4.5	39	77	595	7.7	0

== Professional career ==
Pre-draft measurables
Height	Weight	Arm length	Hand span	40-yard dash	10-yard split	20-yard split	20-yard shuttle	Three-cone drill	Vertical jump	Broad jump	Bench press
5 ft 11 in (1.80 m)	212 lb (96 kg)	30 3/4 in (0.78 m)	8 1/8 in (0.21 m)	4.46 s	1.59 s	2.59 s	4.29 s	6.90 s	37.5 in (0.95 m)	10 ft 4 in (3.15 m)	15 reps
All values from Pro Day

=== Miami Dolphins ===
Darkwa was signed by the Miami Dolphins after going undrafted in the 2014 NFL draft. After appearing in only four games, he was released by the Dolphins on October 6, 2014, but he was re-signed to the practice squad soon after.

=== New York Giants ===
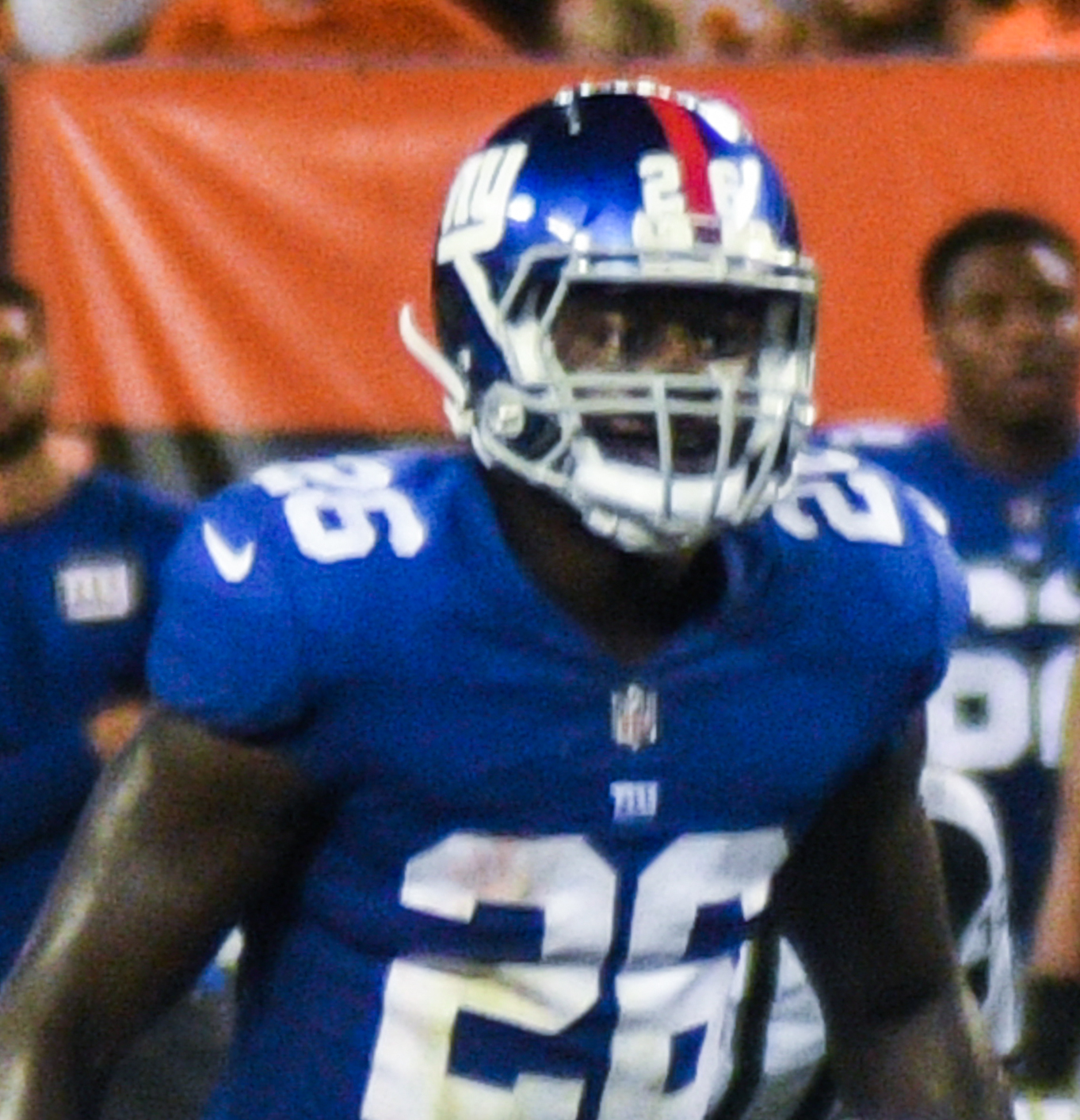
Darkwa with the Giants in 2017

On November 12, 2014, Darkwa was signed by the New York Giants after Michael Cox was placed on injured reserve. He scored his first career touchdown on December 21, 2014, against the St. Louis Rams.

In the 2015 season, he appeared in six games before getting his first rushing attempts of the season against the Dallas Cowboys on October 25. In the 27–20 victory over the Cowboys, he had eight carries for 48 yards and a touchdown. Overall, he finished the 2015 season with 153 rushing yards, one rushing touchdown, three receptions, and 31 receiving yards.

On April 27, 2016, it was reported that Darkwa had suffered a small fracture in his tibia. He had been participating in the Giants offseason program. The Giants expected Darkwa to miss about a month of action. On September 25, against the Washington Redskins, he had 53 rushing yards and a rushing touchdown. On October 3, 2016, Darkwa made his first career start against the Minnesota Vikings, rushing 12 times for 48 yards and a touchdown. He was placed on injured reserve on November 29, 2016, with a lower leg injury. Overall, he finished the 2016 season with 111 rushing yards, two rushing touchdowns, two receptions, and 12 receiving yards.

On March 9, 2017, Darkwa signed a one-year deal with the Giants. Due to injuries to Paul Perkins, Darkwa has started two games. He recorded his first 100-yard game on October 15, 2017, against the Denver Broncos. He helped the Giants beat the Broncos 23–10. He had a career-high 154 yards, including a 75-yard rushing touchdown, in an 18-10 victory over the Washington Redskins. He finished the season with 171 rushing attempts, 751 yards, and five touchdowns. Following the 2017 season he was not re-signed by the Giants and became a free-agent.

Darkwa had a workout with the Jacksonville Jaguars in early October 2018, and the following day ruptured his Achilles tendon in his right leg. In May 2019 Adam Schefter reported that Darkwa was fully recovered from his injury. In late July 2019 Darkwa had a workout with the Cleveland Browns, however, he remained unsigned throughout the 2019 NFL season. Darkwa had a tryout with the Tennessee Titans on August 23, 2020.
