= Vacated victory =

Punishment in American college sports

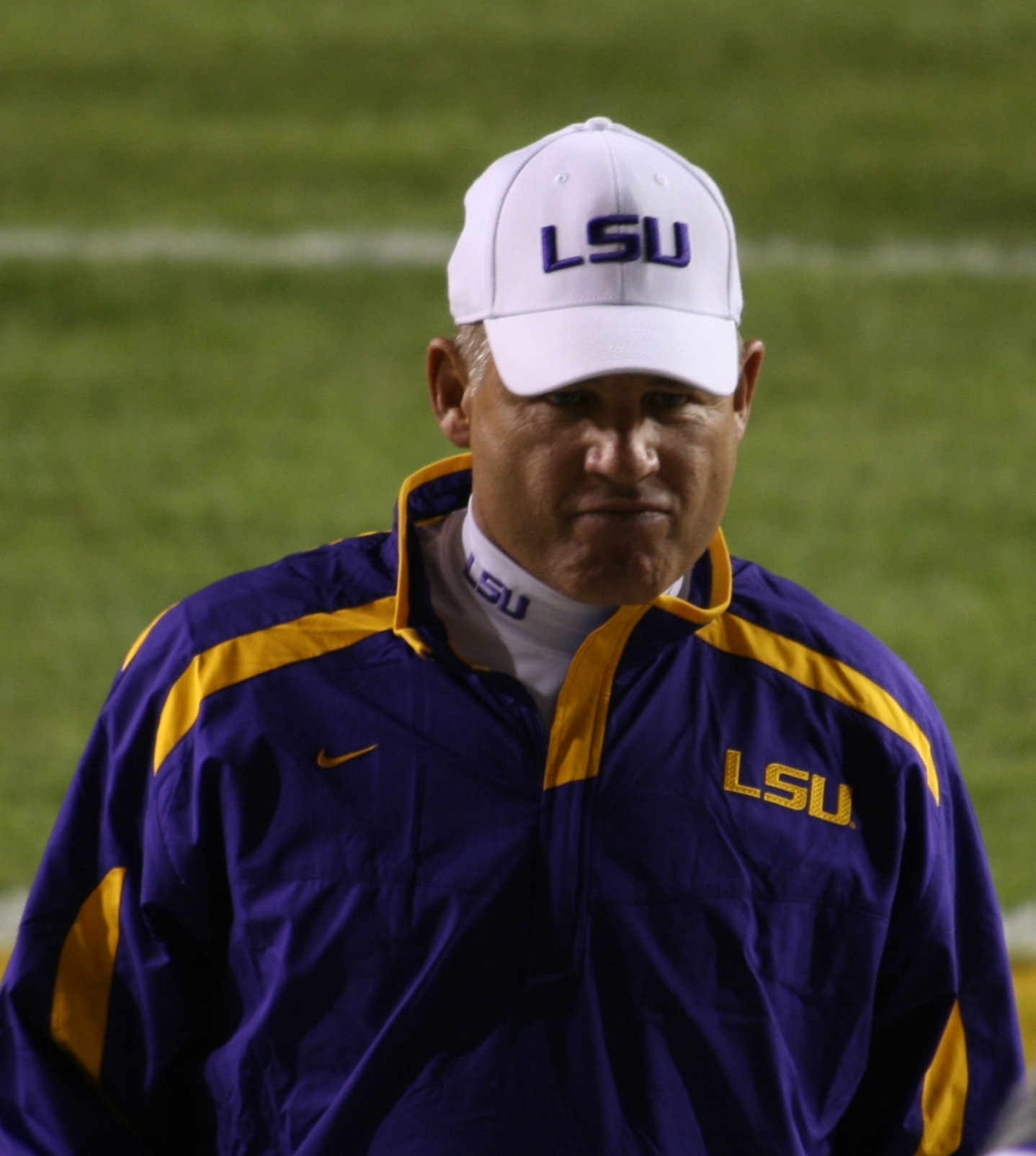
The LSU Tigers football program and head coach Les Miles (pictured) had 37 wins from 2012 to 2015 vacated by the NCAA.

In American college athletics, a vacated victory is a win that the National Collegiate Athletic Association (NCAA) has stripped from an athletic program, usually as punishment for misconduct related to its sports teams. The team being punished is officially stripped of its victory, but the opposing team retains its loss—thus, vacated victories are different from forfeits, in which the losing team is given the win. The practice of vacating victories has been criticized by players and sports journalists, but remains one of the NCAA's preferred penalties for infractions related to past misconduct. Over 160 college football teams and 270 college basketball teams (Note: Here, "team" refers to an individual team season: one athletic program may have wins vacated from consecutive seasons, which are counted separately.) have had wins vacated.

== Definition ==
A vacated victory is distinct from a forfeit, which simply reverses the outcome of a contest: when a game is forfeited, the team that won records a loss and the team that lost records a win. By comparison, a vacated win only removes regular season and tournament wins from the record of the penalized team. The opposing, non-penalized team retains all losses corresponding to vacated games in the regular season (although tournament losses are stricken).

== History ==
In the process of regulating infractions, the NCAA received complaints that their punishments did not penalize the actual perpetrators. Prospective measures, like scholarship reductions or postseason bans, affected athletes who were unrelated to the original violation. To remedy this, the NCAA's committee on infractions adopted the practice of vacating wins as a punishment that would be linked to the specific wrongdoers. The NCAA has broad authority to apply this punishment, but is more likely to do in cases of major systemic fraud in a program or where academically ineligible players have competed. When issuing punishments in the past, the NCAA Committee on Infractions ordered that regular season games be forfeited by the offending team while NCAA tournament games be vacated. More recently, forfeits have not been used at all, and both regular season and tournament games have been vacated.

The precise first use of a vacated win as punishment is unclear. According to Sports Reference, the first recorded use of the punishment in college basketball took place after the 1961 NCAA gambling scandal. The Saint Joseph's Hawks had four games in the NCAA tournament vacated, including their third-place finish.

The first collegiate national title to be vacated was the 1971 men's soccer championship. The Howard Bison were ruled to have fielded ineligible players, although analysts and historians have argued Howard was targeted because of the racial makeup of the team. As of 2018, 20 college programs have had a national title vacated.

The NCAA has vacated wins as a punishment for academic misconduct, impermissible financial benefits, and player sex scandals. After making the punishment official, the NCAA requires schools to return trophies and take down any references (such as banners) to vacated achievements. The NCAA has in some instances also vacated losses in tournaments or championship games, serving to vacate a team's appearance in the tournament or title contest.

== Records between teams ==
By striking the win but not the corresponding loss, vacated victories result in anomalies such as games with losers but no winners, unbalanced series records, (Note: Suppose that Team A and Team B played 10 times, with Team A winning 7 games and Team B winning 3. The series record stands at 7–3 in favor of Team A. If one of Team A's victories in the series is vacated, Team A would have a 6–3 record against Team B, while Team B would have a 3–7 record against Team A.) and inconsistent measures of head-to-head streaks. (Note: Suppose that the winners of a 10-game series between Team A and Team B are as follows: BBAABAAAAA. Normally we would say that Team A has a 5-game winning streak over Team B, or that Team B has a 5-game losing streak to Team A, and the statements would be equivalent. However, if Team A's victory in the eighth game of the series were subsequently vacated, Team B would still have a 5-game losing streak to Team A, but Team A would, depending upon interpretation, have either a 4-game winning streak, or a 2-game winning streak over Team B.)

The NCAA does not maintain official records between any two opposing teams, and initially it had no official policy for the treatment of vacated victories in calculating either series records or win/loss streaks between any two opposing teams. Various media outlets commented on the inconsistency between opponents' series records inherent to vacated victories. In June 2009, both the ESPN.com SEC Blog and the Chattanooga Times Free Press discussed NCAA sanctions against the Alabama Crimson Tide football program; each stated that games with vacated wins do not count at all in a series record between two teams. Later, the NCAA's rules were updated to state that "all team and coaches’ streaks (such as wins, postseason appearances, team statistical streaks, and so on) are terminated by the vacancy of a contest."

== Criticism ==
Athletes, administrators, and sports journalists have criticized the practice of vacating wins, arguing that it is arbitrary, confusing, and disproportionate to the infractions it punishes. Those opposed to the punishment note that the NCAA is effectively asking fans and schools to pretend that the game never happened. Former competitors and fans often reject the punishment, saying that the NCAA cannot take away the on-field accomplishments or memories of games.

The practice of vacating victories has also been called insufficiently preventative, as schools are still able to keep money they received from their vacated accomplishments and fans still consider the on-field result to be "real".

In October 2020, the NCAA stripped the UMass women's tennis team of its 2017 Atlantic 10 Conference championship over the improper reimbursement of a $252 phone bill, leading to a public outcry. One writer called the decision the "single worst miscarriage of justice" in the NCAA's history, as the original error was minor and the university had self-reported. The players involved disputed the punishment, arguing that vacating their victories placed them in the same category as cheaters who gained a competitive advantage from misconduct.

== Notable punishments ==
=== Basketball ===
- The NCAA Final Four appearances by Michigan's Fab Five were vacated because of Chris Webber's association with booster Ed Martin.
- In 2007–08, the Memphis Tigers set an NCAA Division I men's basketball record for wins in a season, led by Derrick Rose and coach John Calipari. The team made it to the finals of the NCAA basketball tournament before losing to Kansas in overtime. All of the wins from that season were later vacated because Rose's SAT score was invalidated, making him an ineligible student-athlete. This was the second Final Four appearance that Calipari had vacated, after the 1996 Final Four with the UMass Minutemen.
- The 2012–13 Louisville Cardinals men were the first Division I basketball team, whether men's or women's, ever stripped of a national title. This was the result of sanctions levied after a program staffer was found to have paid a local madam to provide adult entertainment for players and recruits, rendering several players on the championship team ineligible. These sanctions also caused the Cardinals' 2012 Final Four appearance to be vacated. While the championship remains vacated, a settlement between the NCAA and several Louisville players not implicated in the violations most notably saw the Cardinals' Luke Hancock once again recognized as the 2013 Final Four's Most Outstanding Player.

=== Football ===
- The NCAA stripped former Penn State football head coach Joe Paterno of 111 wins in 2012 because of the Jerry Sandusky scandal, before returning the wins in 2015 as part of a settlement agreement. Thus, during 2012–2015, Paterno was not listed as the head coach with the highest number of wins in the Football Bowl Subdivision (FBS) or its historical predecessors.
- The 2005 USC vs. Notre Dame football game, famous for the "Bush Push", was later vacated because of monetary benefits Reggie Bush received from sports agents while in college.
- Twelve wins by the Florida State Seminoles in their 2006 and 2007 seasons were vacated as a result of the Florida State University academic-athletic scandal.
- The 2009 ACC Championship Game victory by Georgia Tech was vacated due to Georgia Tech’s athletics department hindering an NCAA investigation into Demaryius Thomas receiving $312 worth of clothing from a former player, by informing Thomas and another player ahead of time that they were going to be interviewed, which the NCAA viewed as evidence of intentionally playing an ineligible player. While some reports indicate that Georgia Tech was also made to vacate two losses (to Georgia and Iowa), Georgia Tech does not recognize the losses as vacated in their media guide, as of 2023.
- Bowl game victories that have been vacated by the NCAA include:
  - 2005 Orange Bowl, USC
    - This was also the Bowl Championship Series (BCS) title game for the 2004 season; the 2004 USC Trojans football team was forced to vacate its national championship, although the Associated Press (AP) still recognizes USC as winners of the 2004 national championship.
  - 2006 Emerald Bowl, Florida State
  - 2011 Sugar Bowl, Ohio State
  - 2011 New Orleans Bowl, Louisiana–Lafayette
  - 2013 New Orleans Bowl, Louisiana–Lafayette
  - 2013 Pinstripe Bowl, Notre Dame
  - 2014 Outback Bowl, LSU
  - 2015 Texas Bowl, LSU
  - 2020 Gator Bowl, Tennessee
- Rarely, losses have been vacated in NCAA records, which does not affect the winning team. The intention of this penalty has been to vacate a losing team's appearance in a game, which in the following two cases, were the BCS National Championship Games of the 2005 and 2012 seasons, respectively.
  - 2006 Rose Bowl, USC
  - 2013 BCS National Championship Game, Notre Dame
  - In addition, the 1998 SMU Mustangs football team had to vacate the results of their first 10 games (4 wins and 6 losses), due to use of an ineligible player, resulting in their initial 5–7 record being recorded as an official 1–1 record. This is the only known time in major college football history (FBS or its historical predecessors) that a team has had to vacate more losses in a season than wins.

=== Other sports ===
- After the 1990 men's lacrosse championships, the NCAA vacated Syracuse's victory when they determined that star player Paul Gait was ineligible due to having a car loan co-signed by the coach's wife. Syracuse refused to acknowledge the punishment and the trophy went missing. Syracuse later commissioned a replacement trophy, without the NCAA logo, that the university still displays.
- The NCAA controversially stripped the UMass women's tennis team of its 2017 Atlantic 10 Conference championship in October 2020 due to the improper reimbursement of a $252 phone bill.

== See also ==
- List of vacated and forfeited games in college basketball
- List of vacated games in NCAA Division I FBS football
