= 2011 New Orleans Bowl =

2011 R+L Carriers New Orleans Bowl
- Louisiana win vacated by the NCAA in 2016
San Diego State Aztecs	Louisiana Ragin' Cajuns
(8–4)	(8–4 (Note: ULL later vacated all wins during the season for an official 0–4 record.))
Mountain West	Sun Belt
30	32
Head coach: Rocky Long	Head coach: Mark Hudspeth
	1	2	3	4	Total
San Diego State	3	0	14	13	30
Louisiana	6	7	6	13	32
- Date: December 17, 2011
- Season: 2011
- Stadium: Mercedes-Benz Superdome
- Location: New Orleans, Louisiana
- MVP: QB Blaine Gautier, UL-Lafayette
- Favorite: San Diego State by 5
- Referee: Randy Christal (Big 12)
- Attendance: 42,841
- Payout: US$325,000 per team

United States TV coverage
- Network: ESPN/ESPN 3D
- Announcers: Carter Blackburn (Play-by-Play); Brock Huard (Analyst); Shelley Smith (Sidelines)
- Nielsen ratings: 1.63

The 2011 R+L Carriers New Orleans Bowl, part of the 2011–12 bowl game season, took place on December 17, 2011, at the Mercedes-Benz Superdome in New Orleans, Louisiana. The 11th edition of the game featured the Louisiana Ragin' Cajuns from the Sun Belt Conference (Sun Belt), and the San Diego State Aztecs from the Mountain West Conference. The game was telecast at 8:00 p.m. CT on ESPN and ESPN 3D.

In March 2016, Louisiana vacated its 2011 and 2013 New Orleans Bowl wins, due to major NCAA violations including ACT exam fraud and payments to recruits.

== Teams ==
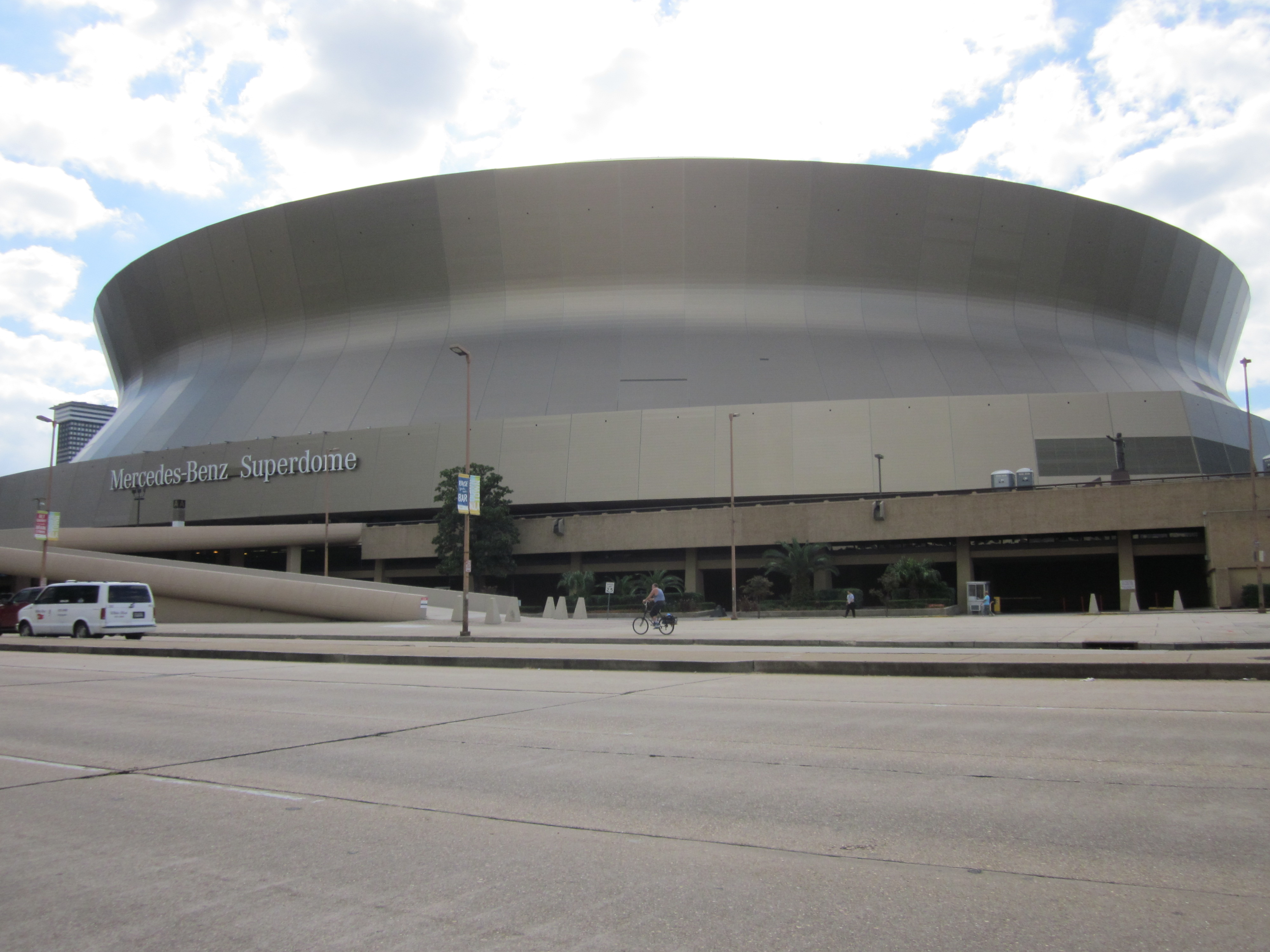
The 2011 New Orleans Bowl was played at the Mercedes-Benz Superdome.

Louisiana accepted a bid to compete in the 2011 edition of the game on November 21, while San Diego State accepted a bid on December 4.

=== University of Louisiana at Lafayette ===
On November 21, 2011, the UL Ragin' Cajuns accepted an invite to represent the Sun Belt Conference. Prior to the start of the 2011 season, the Ragin' Cajuns were expected to finish last in the Sun Belt Conference and be ranked last among the 120 FBS school. However, the Ragin' Cajuns team was a surprise and finished the regular season with an 8-4 record. The New Orleans Bowl marked UL's first ever division I FBS bowl appearance and their first bowl appearance since the 1970 Grantland Rice Bowl. Because of UL's close proximity to New Orleans, the New Orleans Bowl set an attendance record at 42,841. However, in 2015, Louisiana–Lafayette was forced to vacated all nine wins including the New Orleans Bowl due to major NCAA violations including ACT exam fraud and payments to players.

=== San Diego State University ===
On December 4, 2011, the San Diego State Aztecs accepted an invite to represent the Mountain West Conference. The Aztecs entered the bowl with a record of 8–4. SDSU's season was helped by Ronnie Hillman, who rushed for 1,656 yards and 19 touchdowns. This marked SDSU's sixth bowl appearance and their second consecutive following the 2010 Poinsettia Bowl. The bowl game also marked the first time the Aztecs appeared back-to-back division I bowl games.

Neither team previously appeared in the New Orleans Bowl. The bowl game marked the first ever meeting between the two schools.

== Game summary ==
The Aztecs scored first with a 27-yard field goal from Abelardo Perez. The Ragin' Cajuns responded with a touchdown to make the score 6–3, after the point after was blocked. In the second quarter, the Ragin' Cajuns went up 13–3 when Darryl Surgent scored on an 87-yard punt return. Louisiana added to their lead when they scored a touchdown in the third quarter to go up 19–3 (the PAT failed). However, the Aztecs closed the deficit to two at the end of the third quarter with two San Diego State touchdown passes from quarterback Colin Lockett. Lockett's second touchdown pass capped off a seven-play, 99-yard drive.

Louisiana scored another touchdown in the fourth quarter to make it 26–17. The Aztecs responded with their own touchdown to make it 26–24 with 5:40 left. On their next possession, the Ragin' Cajuns marched towards the three-yard line but had to settle for a field goal with 2:09 left. The Aztecs then scored a touchdown to take the lead 30–29 with 35 seconds left. The Aztecs attempted go up by three points on a two-point conversion, but failed. With no timeouts left, Louisiana managed to get in range for a 55-yard field, before the Aztecs were called for an "illegal stemming" penalty, thus reducing the field goal range to 50-yard. Placekicker Brett Baer made the kick, sealing a 32–30 victory for the Ragin' Cajuns.

UL's Blaine Gautier had 470 passing yards in the game, breaking the previous New Orleans Bowl record of 387 passing yards set in 2010. Gautier's performance in the bowl game also helped him finish the season with 2,958 yards passing and 23 touchdowns, breaking the previous school single-season record set by Jake Delhomme. Aztec running back Ronnie Hillman was limited to only 55 yards; Hillman had been averaging 138 yards per game coming into the New Orleans Bowl.

== Reaction ==
=== Controversy ===
Prior to a 55-yard field goal attempt by the UL Cajuns with four seconds to go, an official called a five-yard "illegal stemming" penalty against the SDSU Aztecs to set up the Cajuns' 50-yard game-winning field goal. Following the game, Aztecs coach Rocky Long said it was a "phantom call," claiming that no one was moving on the Aztec's side. However, replays clearly show the Aztec defender moving.

== Scoring summary ==
Scoring Play	Score
1st Quarter
SDSU – Abelardo Perez 27 yard kick, 9:35	SDSU 3–0
UL – Blaine Gautier 18-yard pass to Javone Lawson (kick blocked), 0:25	UL 6–3
2nd Quarter
UL – Darryl Surgent 87-yard punt return (Brett Baer kick), 14:00	UL 13–3
3rd Quarter
UL – Blaine Gautier 20-yard pass to Ladarius Green (kick failed), 14:01	UL 19–3
SDSU – Ryan Lindley 16-yard pass to Colin Lockett (Abelardo Perez kick), 12:54	UL 19–10
SDSU – Ryan Lindley 16-yard pass to Colin Lockett (Abelardo Perez kick), 3:40	UL 19–17
4th Quarter
UL – Blaine Gautier 11-yard pass to Javone Lawson (Brett Baer kick), 12:48	UL 26–17
SDSU – Adam Muema 5-yard run (Abelardo Perez kick), 05:40	UL 26–24
UL – Brett Baer 22 yard kick, 02:09	UL 29–24
SDSU – Ryan Lindley 12-yard pass to Colin Lockett (two-point conversion failed), 00:35	SDSU 30–29
UL – Brett Baer 50 yard kick, 00:00	UL 32–30

=== Statistics ===
Statistics	SDSU	UL
First downs	30	25
Rushes-yards (net)	31–68	30–76
Passing yards (net)	413	491
Passes, Att-Comp-Int	28–49–0	25–44–1
Total offense, plays – yards	80–481	74–567
Time of Possession	33:30	26:30
