= 2011 Louisiana–Lafayette Ragin' Cajuns football team =

American college football season

2011 Louisiana–Lafayette Ragin' Cajuns football

New Orleans Bowl, W 32–30 (vacated) vs. San Diego State
- Conference: Sun Belt Conference
- Record: 1–4, 8 wins vacated (1–2 Sun Belt, 5 wins vacated)
- Head coach: Mark Hudspeth (1st season)
- Offensive coordinator: Jay Johnson (1st season)
- Offensive scheme: Spread
- Defensive coordinator: Greg Stewart (1st season)
- Base defense: 4–3
- Home stadium: Cajun Field

2011 Sun Belt Conference football standings
| | Conf. | | | Overall |
| Team | W | | L | W | | L |
|---|---|---|---|---|---|---|
| Arkansas State $ | 8 | – | 0 | 10 | – | 3 |
| Western Kentucky | 7 | – | 1 | 7 | – | 5 |
| FIU | 5 | – | 3 | 8 | – | 5 |
| North Texas | 4 | – | 4 | 5 | – | 7 |
| Louisiana–Monroe | 3 | – | 5 | 4 | – | 8 |
| Troy | 2 | – | 6 | 3 | – | 9 |
| Louisiana–Lafayette * | 1 | – | 2 | 1 | – | 4 |
| Middle Tennessee | 1 | – | 7 | 2 | – | 10 |
| Florida Atlantic | 0 | – | 8 | 1 | – | 11 |
$ – Conference champion; * – Louisiana–Lafayette vacated 8 wins including 5 in conference due to NCAA violations.

The 2011 Louisiana–Lafayette Ragin' Cajuns football program represented the University of Louisiana at Lafayette in the 2011 NCAA Division I FBS football season. The Ragin' Cajuns were led by first year head coach Mark Hudspeth and played their home games at Cajun Field. They are members of the Sun Belt Conference. They finished the season 9–4 overall and 6–2 in Sun Belt play to finish in third place. They were invited to the New Orleans Bowl, the program's first bowl game, where they defeated San Diego State. However, in 2015 Louisiana–Lafayette vacated eight wins including their New Orleans Bowl victory due to major NCAA violations.

== Preseason ==
=== Award watchlists ===
| Award | Player | Position | Year |
|---|---|---|---|
| John Mackey Award | Ladarius Green | TE | SR |
| Fred Biletnikoff Award | Ladarius Green | TE | SR |

=== Sun Belt Media Day ===
==== Predicted standings ====
Sun Belt Conference predicted standings
| Predicted finish | Team | Votes (1st Place) |
|---|---|---|
| 1 | Florida International | 75 (5) |
| 2 | Troy | 66 (2) |
| 3 | Middle Tennessee | 54 |
| 4 | Louisiana-Monroe | 22 |
| 5 | Arkansas State | 49 (1) |
| 6 | North Texas | 33 |
| 7 | Western Kentucky | 28 (1) |
| 8 | Louisiana-Lafayette | 26 |
| 9 | Florida Atlantic | 20 |

==== Preseason All–Conference Team ====
Offense

TE Ladarius Green

== Roster ==
2011 Louisiana–Lafayette Ragin' Cajuns football team roster
Players
Coaches
Offense

| Pos. | # | Name | Class |
|---|---|---|---|
| WR | 4 | Javone Lawson | Jr |
| RB | 6 | Robert Walker | So |
| QB | 7 | Chris Masson | Sr |
| QB | 8 | Brad McGuire | Sr |
| WR | 9 | Harry Peoples | Jr |
| TE | 10 | Larry Pettis | Fr |
| QB | 13 | Brady Thomas | Jr |
| WR | 15 | Ross Goodlett | Sr |
| QB | 17 | Blaine Gautier | Jr |
| WR | 18 | Andrew Joseph | Sr |
| RB | 20 | Aaron Spikes | So |
| RB | 23 | Qyendarius Griffin | Fr |
| FB | 26 | Yobes Walker | Jr |
| RB | 29 | Montrel Carter | Fr |
| RB | 31 | Effrem Reed | Fr |
| FB | 39 | Fred Okoye | Jr |
| RB | 46 | Alonzo Harris | Fr |
| G | 60 | Tracy Wilson | Jr |
| OL | 62 | Jarad Martin | Fr |
| OL | 63 | Brandon Bender | Jr |
| OL | 66 | Marvin Martin | Fr |
| OL | 67 | Daniel Quave | Fr |
| OL | 68 | Octravian Anderson | Fr |
| OL | 69 | Greg Siener | Fr |
| C | 71 | Andre Huval | So |
| G | 72 | Leonard Bates | Jr |
| OL | 73 | Fred Moore | Fr |
| G | 74 | Kyle Plouhar | Sr |
| OL | 75 | Benay Pryer | Jr |
| OL | 76 | Jaron Odom | Jr |
| OL | 77 | Jaylen Hunter | Fr |
| G | 78 | Daniel Lemelle | So |
| OT | 79 | Sheldon Brown | Sr |
| WR | 80 | Adam Savoie | Fr |
| WR | 81 | Boris Anyama | Fr |
| WR | 83 | James Butler | So |
| WR | 84 | Jamal Robinson | Fr |
| TE | 85 | Ian Thompson | So |
| TE | 86 | Jacob Maxwell | So |
| WR | 87 | Darryl Surgent | So |
| WR | 88 | Deon Fowler | Fr |
| TE | 89 | Ladarius Green | Sr |
| WR | | Lawrence Breaud | Fr |
| QB | | Terrance Broadway | So |
| WR | | Bradley Brown | Fr |
| WR | | Billy Christian | So |
| OL | | Willy David | Fr |
| OL | | Chris Frigo | Fr |
| WR | | Shawn Hebert | Fr |
| QB | | Blake Hollingsworth | Fr |
| FB | | Chase Julien | Fr |
| WR | | Brandon Kensey | So |
| WR | | DeShaun McNeal | Fr |
| OL | | Evyn Perry | Jr |
| QB | | Riley Saunders | Jr |
| OL | | Corey Schmidt | So |
| WR | | Layne Theriot | Fr |
| TE | | Cory Weaver | Fr |

Defense

| Pos. | # | Name | Class |
|---|---|---|---|
| CB | 2 | JeMarlous Moten | Jr |
| CB | 3 | Pierre Hill | Sr |
| CB | 5 | Dwight Bentley | Sr |
| LB | 11 | Devon Lewis-Buchanan | Sr |
| CB | 16 | Dexter Aucoin | Fr |
| CB | 19 | Rodney Gillis | Jr |
| LB | 21 | Lance Kelly | Sr |
| CB | 22 | Melvin White | Sr |
| FS | 24 | Lionel Stokes | Sr |
| FS | 25 | Cooper Gerami | So |
| SS | 27 | Earnest Gardner | Fr |
| LB | 28 | Marcus Jackson | Fr |
| LB | 30 | Le'Marcus Gibson | Sr |
| CB | 33 | Trevence Patt | Fr |
| DE | 34 | Justin Anderson | So |
| S | 35 | Eric Buckley | Fr |
| S | 37 | Hunter Thibodeaux | So |
| LB | 38 | Brandon Johnson | Fr |
| CB | 41 | Sean Thomas | Fr |
| LB | 43 | Jesse Broadnax | Jr |
| DE | 44 | Bernard Smith | Sr |
| DE | 45 | Emeke Onyenekwu | Jr |
| DE | 47 | Blake Comminie | Jr |
| LB | 48 | Andrew Hebert | So |
| LB | 50 | Mario Holman | Fr |
| LB | 51 | Jelani Smith | Jr |
| LB | 52 | Dominique Tovell | Fr |
| DE | 53 | Christopher Tucker | Sr |
| DE | 54 | Kevon Foster | Fr |
| LB | 55 | Brandon Nash | So |
| LB | 56 | Richard Brooks | Sr |
| DE | 57 | Chris Prater | Fr |
| DE | 58 | Nick Barnfield | So |
| LB | 59 | Jake Molbert | Fr |
| DL | 64 | Ben Duhon | Jr |
| DT | 90 | Derreck Dean | Sr |
| DL | 92 | Christian Ringo | Fr |
| DT | 93 | Cordian Hagans | Jr |
| DT | 94 | Justin Hamilton | Fr |
| DT | 96 | Brandon McCray | So |
| DE | 97 | Aaron Thibodeaux | Fr |
| DT | 98 | Darrell Green | Fr |
| DE | 99 | Tyrell Gaddies | Sr |
| SS | | Winston Burnette | So |
| LB | | Joey Chapman | Fr |
| FS | | Zachary DeGrange | Fr |
| S | | Lance Derousselle | Fr |
| CB | | Kobie Douglas | Fr |
| S | | Chris Faber | Fr |
| CB | | Eric Ferguson | Jr |
| DL | | Blake Fuselier | Fr |
| LB | | David Laborde | Fr |
| FS | | O' Neil Parker | Fr |
| CB | | Torrey Pierce | Fr |
| LB | | Christian Sager | Fr |
| S | | Kendall Sam | So |
| LB | | Jeremy Tollver | Jr |
| LB | | Taylor Vernotzy | So |
| CB | | Eddie Williams | Fr |

Special teams

| Pos. | # | Name | Class |
|---|---|---|---|
| K | 40 | Brett Baer | Jr |
| LS | 49 | Matt Rosenbalm | Jr |
| LS | 82 | John Broussard | Fr |
| K | 91 | Carlos Alvarez | Fr |
| K | 95 | Hunter Stover | Fr |
| K | | Travis Shinn | Fr |

Head coach

- Mark Hudspeth (Delta State)

Coordinators/assistant coaches

- Jay Johnson (Northern Iowa)
  Offensive coordinator/quarterbacks
- Greg Stewart (Troy)
  Defensive coordinator
- Marquase Lovings (Howard)
  Running backs
- Jorge Munoz (Bethany (KS))
  Wide receivers
- Mitch Rodrigue (Nicholls State)
  Offensive line/run game coordinator
- Tommy Rybacki (Jacksonville State)
  Outside linebackers
- Reed Stringer (Delta State)
  Tight ends
- David Saunders (Auburn)
  Cornerbacks
- Rusty Whitt (Abilene Christian)
  Strength & conditioning coach
- Troy Wingerter (Louisiana)
  Director of football operations

Legend

- (C) Team captain
- (S) Suspended
- (I) Ineligible
- Injured
- Redshirt

Roster
Last update: January 6, 2019

== Schedule ==
| Date | Time | Opponent | Site | TV | Result | Attendance |
|---|---|---|---|---|---|---|
| September 3 | 6:00 pm | at No. 8 Oklahoma State* | Boone Pickens Stadium; Stillwater, OK | FCS | L 34–61 | 55,382 |
| September 10 | 6:00 pm | at Kent State* | Dix Stadium; Kent, OH | | W 20–12 (vacated) | 10,386 |
| September 17 | 6:00 pm | Nicholls State* | Cajun Field; Lafayette, LA | Ragin Cajuns Network/ESPN3 | W 38–21 (vacated) | 28,741 |
| September 24 | 5:00 pm | at Florida International | FIU Stadium; Miami, FL | ESPN3 | W 36–31 (vacated) | 16,780 |
| October 1 | 6:00 pm | Florida Atlantic | Cajun Field; Lafayette, LA | RCN/ESPN3 | W 37–34 (vacated) | 26,339 |
| October 8 | 7:00 pm | Troy | Cajun Field; Lafayette, LA | ESPN3 | W 31–17 (vacated) | 29,775 |
| October 15 | 4:00 pm | North Texas^{†} | Cajun Field; Lafayette, LA | RCN/ESPN3 | W 30–10 (vacated) | 32,823 |
| October 22 | 3:00 pm | at Western Kentucky | Houchens Industries–L. T. Smith Stadium; Bowling Green, KY | | L 23–42 | 15,122 |
| October 29 | 6:30 pm | at Middle Tennessee | Johnny "Red" Floyd Stadium; Murfreesboro, TN | Sun Belt Network | W 45–20 | 13,500 |
| November 5 | 2:30 pm | Louisiana–Monroe | Cajun Field; Lafayette, LA (Battle on the Bayou) | Sun Belt Network | W 36–35 (vacated) | 28,176 |
| November 12 | 2:00 pm | at Arkansas State | ASU Stadium; Jonesboro, AR | | L 21–30 | 20,261 |
| November 26 | 2:00 pm | at Arizona* | Arizona Stadium; Tucson, AZ | | L 37–45 | 38,819 |
| December 17 | 8:00 pm | vs. San Diego State* | Mercedes-Benz Superdome; New Orleans, LA (New Orleans Bowl) | ESPN | W 32–30 (vacated) | 42,841 |
*Non-conference game; ^{†}Homecoming; Rankings from Coaches' Poll released prior to the game; All times are in Central time

== Game summaries ==
=== @ Oklahoma State ===
Louisiana-Lafayette at Oklahoma State – Game summary

| Quarter | 1 | 2 | 3 | 4 | Total |
|---|---|---|---|---|---|
| Ragin' Cajuns | 3 | 7 | 10 | 14 | 34 |
| No. 9 Cowboys | 10 | 24 | 10 | 17 | 61 |

at Boone Pickens Stadium, Stillwater, OK

- Date: September 3
- Game time: 6:00 p.m. CST
- Game weather: 100 °F (38 °C); sunny
- Game attendance: 55,382
- Referee: Tom Walker
- TV: FCS

Game information

First quarter

- OSU - Quinn Sharp 27-yard field goal, 10:48 (OSU 3-0)
- OSU - Joseph Randle 4-yard TD run, Sharp kick good, 3:16 (OSU 10-0)
- ULL - Brett Baer 23-yard field goal, 0:16 (OSU 10-3)

Second quarter

- OSU - Jeremy Smith 1-yard TD run, Sharp kick good, 11:17 (OSU 17-3)
- OSU - Josh Cooper 15-yard TD pass from Brandon Weeden, Sharp kick good, 8:38 (OSU 24-3)
- OSU - Randle 4-yard TD run, Sharp kick good, 6:36 (OSU 31-3)
- ULL - Dwight Bentley 38-yard interception return for TD, Baer kick good, 1:31 (OSU 31-10)
- OSU - Sharp 22-yard field goal, 0:00 (OSU 34-10)

Third quarter

- OSU - Sharp 46-yard field goal, 8:17 (OSU 37-10)
- ULL - Baer 29-yard field goal, 3:03 (OSU 37-13)
- OSU - Tracy Moore 19-yard TD pass from Weeden, Sharp kick good, 2:23 (OSU 44-13)
- ULL - Jemarlous Moten 50-yard interception return for TD, Baer kick good, 1:23 (OSU 44-20)

Fourth quarter

- OSU - Michael Harrison 15-yard TD pass from Weeden, 14:55 (OSU 51-20)
- ULL - Blaine Gautier 1-yard TD run, Baer kick good, 8:14 (OSU 51-27)
- OSU - Sharp 23-yard field goal, 5:36 (OSU 54-27)
- OSU - Isaiah Anderson 7-yard TD pass from Clint Chelf, Sharp kick good, 2:52 (OSU 61-27)
- ULL - Qyendarius Griffin 3-yard TD run, Baer kick good, 0:17 (OSU 61-34)

Top passers

- OSU - Brandon Weeden - 24/39, 388 yards, 3 TD, 3 INT
- ULL - Blaine Gautier - 13/26, 106 yards, INT

Top rushers

- OSU - Joseph Randle - 22 carries, 129 yards, 2 TD
- ULL - Qyendarius Griffin - 9 carries, 37 yards, TD

Top receivers

- OSU - Justin Blackmon - 8 receptions, 144 yards
- ULL - Javone Lawson - 3 receptions, 67 yards

=== @ Kent State ===
Louisiana-Lafayette at Kent State – Game summary

| Quarter | 1 | 2 | 3 | 4 | Total |
|---|---|---|---|---|---|
| Ragin' Cajuns | 7 | 10 | 0 | 3 | 20 |
| Golden Flashes | 7 | 0 | 5 | 0 | 12 |

at Dix Stadium, Kent, OH

- Date: September 10
- Game time: 6:00 p.m. CST
- Game weather: 68 °F (20 °C); rain
- Game attendance: 10,386
- Referee: Mike Conlin

Game information

First quarter

- ULL - Lionel Stokes 63-yard interception returned for TD, Brett Baer kick good, 5:32 (ULL 7-0)
- KENT - Jacquise Terry 6-yard TD pass from Spencer Keith, Freddy Cortez kick good, 0:39 (TIE 7-7)

Second quarter

- ULL - Qyendarius Griffin 1-yard TD run, Baer kick good, 12:56, (ULL 14-7)
- ULL - Baer 35-yard field goal, 0:20 (ULL 17-7)

Third quarter

- KENT - C.J. Malauulu 7-yard sack of Chris Masson for SF, 8:12 (ULL 17-9)
- KENT - Cortez 44-yard field goal, 1:31 (ULL 17-12)

Fourth quarter

- ULL - Baer 28-yard field goal, 6:08 (ULL 20-12)

Top passers

- ULL - Blaine Gautier - 2/2, 28 yards
- KENT - Spencer Keith - 15/33, 114 yards, TD, INT

Top rushers

- ULL - Qyendarius Griffin - 24 carries, 51 yards, TD
- KENT - Anthony Meray - 12 carries, 39 yards

Top receivers

- ULL - Javone Lawson - 3 receptions, 34 yards
- KENT - Sam Kirkland - 6 receptions, 51 yards

=== Nicholls State ===
Nicholls State at Louisiana-Lafayette – Game summary

| Quarter | 1 | 2 | 3 | 4 | Total |
|---|---|---|---|---|---|
| Colonels | 14 | 0 | 7 | 0 | 21 |
| Ragin' Cajuns | 14 | 7 | 7 | 10 | 38 |

at Cajun Field, Lafayette, LA

- Date: September 17
- Game time: 6:00 p.m. CST
- Game weather: 86 °F (30 °C); sunny
- Game attendance: 28,741
- Referee: Kevin Stine
- TV: Ragin' Cajuns TV Network

Game information

First quarter

- ULL - Chris Masson 1-yard TD run, Brett Baer kick good, 9:24 (ULL 7-0)
- NICH - Marcus Washington 10-yard TD run, Andrew Dolan kick good, 6:42 (TIE 7-7)
- ULL - Brad McGuire 1-yard TD run, Baer kick good, 4:33 (ULL 14-0)
- NICH - Joshua Warren 36-yard TD pass from LaQuintin Caston, Dolan kick good, 0:46 (TIE 14-14)

Second quarter

- ULL - Melvin White 68-yard field goal blocked for TD return, Baer kick good, 6:27 (ULL 21-14)

Third quarter

- ULL - Dwight Bentley 41-yard interception returned for TD, Baer kick good, 13:23 (ULL 28-14)
- NICH - Washington 9-yard TD pass from Caston, Dolan kick good, 9:00 (ULL 28-21)

Fourth quarter

- ULL - Baer 49-yard field goal, 12:04 (ULL 31-21)
- ULL - Javone Lawson 60-yard TD pass from Blaine Gautier, Baer kick good, 5:50 (ULL 38-21)

Top passers

- ULL - Blaine Gautier - 3/4, 78 yards, TD
- NICH - LaQuintin Caston - 8/16, 100 yards, 2 TD, INT

Top rushers

- ULL - Alonzo Harris - 11 carries, 76 yards
- NICH - Marcus Washington - 16 carries, 95 yards, TD

Top receivers

- ULL - Javone Lawson - 2 receptions, 71 yards
- NICH - Joshua Warren - reception, 36 yards, TD

=== @ Florida International ===
Louisiana-Lafayette at Florida International – Game summary

| Quarter | 1 | 2 | 3 | 4 | Total |
|---|---|---|---|---|---|
| Ragin' Cajuns | 5 | 10 | 14 | 7 | 36 |
| Panthers | 7 | 7 | 7 | 10 | 31 |

at Alfonso Field at FIU Stadium, Miami, FL

- Date: September 24
- Game time: 5:00 p.m. CST
- Game weather: 84 °F (29 °C); mostly cloudy
- Game attendance: 16,780
- Referee: Jeff Hilyer
- TV: ESPN3

Game information

First quarter

- FIU - Kedrick Rhodes 43-yard TD run, Jack Griffin kick good, 13:04 (FIU 7-0)
- ULL - Derreck Dean -6-yard SF, 7:18 (FIU 7-2)
- ULL - Brett Baer 48-yard field goal, 5:07 (FIU 7-5)

Second quarter

- ULL - Baer 39-yard field goal, 11:39 (ULL 8-7)
- ULL - Ladarius Green 41-yard TD pass from Blaine Gautier, Baer kick good, 0:50 (ULL 15-7)
- FIU - Rhodes 11-yard TD run, Griffin kick good, 0:30 (ULL 15-14)

Third quarter

- ULL - Darryl Surgent 22-yard TD pass from Gautier, Baer kick good, 13:24 (ULL 22-14)
- FIU - Jake Medlock 2-yard TD run, Griffin kick good, 10:16 (ULL 22-21)
- ULL - Alonzo Harris 13-yard TD run, Baer kick good, 8:20 (ULL 29-21)

Fourth quarter

- FIU - Griffin 20-yard field goal, 14:06 (ULL 29-24)
- ULL - Javone Lawson 46-yard TD pass from Gautier, Baer kick good, 12:40 (ULL 36-24)
- FIU - Rhodes 2-yard TD run, Griffin kick good, 6:51 (ULL 26-31)

Top passers

- ULL - Blaine Gautier - 14/26, 221 yards, 3 TD
- FIU - Jake Medlock - 17/27, 216 yards, INT

Top rushers

- ULL - Blaine Gautier - 15 carries, 86 yards

FIU - Kedrick Rhodes - 30 carries, 157 yards, 3 TD

Top receivers

- ULL - Javone Lawson - 3 receptions, 77 yards, TD
- FIU - Wayne Times - 2 receptions, 75 yards

=== Florida Atlantic ===
Florida Atlantic at Louisiana-Lafayette – Game summary

| Quarter | 1 | 2 | 3 | 4 | Total |
|---|---|---|---|---|---|
| Owls | 10 | 10 | 0 | 14 | 34 |
| Ragin' Cajuns | 7 | 14 | 3 | 13 | 37 |

at Cajun Field, Lafayette, LA

- Date: October 1
- Game time: 6:00 p.m. CST
- Game weather: 77 °F (25 °C); sunny and clear
- Game attendance: 26,339
- Referee: Tony Backert
- TV: Ragin' Cajuns TV Network

Game information

First quarter

- ULL - Harry Peoples 31-yard TD pass from Blaine Gautier, Brett Baer kick good, 11:36 (ULL 7-0)
- FAU - Vinny Zaccario 26-yard field goal, 3:25 (ULL 7-3)
- FAU - Darian Williams 24-yard TD pass from Graham Wilbert, Zaccario kick good, 0:17 (FAU 10-7)

Second quarter

- FAU - Alfred Morris 6-yard TD run, Zaccario kick good, 9:19 (FAU 17-7)
- ULL - Darryl Surgent 42-yard TD pass from Gautier, Baer kick good, 7:22 (FAU 17-14)
- ULL - Qyendarius Griffin 2-yard TD run, Baer kick good, 3:36 (ULL 21-17)
- FAU - Zaccario 36-yard field goal, 0:00 (ULL 21-20)

Third quarter

- ULL - Baer 47-yard field goal, 6:37 (ULL 24-20)

Fourth quarter

- ULL - Alonzo Harris 9-yard TD run, Baer kick good, 12:58 (ULL 31-20)
- ULL - Baer 46-yard field goal, 7:43 (ULL 34-20)
- FAU - Nexon Dorvilus 5-yard TD pass from Wilbert, 5:41 (ULL 34-27)
- FAU - Xavier Stinson 12-yard TD pass from Wilbert, 1:48 (TIE 34-34)
- ULL - Baer 26-yard field goal, 0:00 (ULL 37-34)

Top passers

- ULL - Blaine Gautier - 26/33, 329 yards, 2 TD
- FAU - Graham Wilbert - 20/38, 219 yards, 3 TD, INT

Top rushers

- ULL - Alonzo Harris - 14 carries, 57 yards, TD
- FAU - Alfred Morris - 20 carries, 78 yards, TD

Top receivers

- ULL - Harry Peoples - 12 receptions, 176 yards, TD
- FAU - Marcus Cunningham - 3 receptions, 65 yards

=== Troy ===
Troy at Louisiana-Lafayette – Game summary

| Quarter | 1 | 2 | 3 | 4 | Total |
|---|---|---|---|---|---|
| Trojans | 3 | 10 | 7 | 7 | 27 |
| Ragin' Cajuns | 7 | 17 | 7 | 0 | 31 |

at Cajun Field, Lafayette, LA

- Date: October 8
- Game time: 6:00 p.m. CST
- Game weather: 81 °F (27 °C); partly cloudy
- Game attendance: 29,775
- Referee: Kevin Stine
- TV: ESPN3

Game information

First quarter

- ULL - Larry Pettis 1-yard TD pass from Chris Masson, Brett Baer kick good, 10:32 (ULL 7-0)
- TROY - Michael Taylor 36-yard field goal, 4:40 (ULL 7-3)

Second quarter

- ULL - Javone Lawson 26-yard TD pass from Masson, Baer kick good, 6:36 (ULL 14-3)
- ULL - Baer 24-yard field goal, 1:05 (ULL 17-3)
- ULL - Melvin White 89-yard interception return for TD, Baer kick good, 0:03 (ULL 24-3)

Third quarter

- TROY - Jaquon Robinson 5-yard TD pass from Corey Robinson, Taylor kick good, 9:48 (ULL 24-10)
- ULL - Alonzo Harris 2-yard TD run, Baer kick good, 1:50 (ULL 31-10)

Fourth quarter

- TROY - Eric Thomas 27-yard TD pass from Robinson, Taylor kick good, 10:17 (ULL 31-17)

Top passers

- ULL - Chris Masson - 21/29, 211 yards, 2 TD
- TROY - Corey Robinson - 38/53, 322 yards, 2 TD, INT

Top rushers

- ULL - Alonzo Harris - 22 carries, 81 yards, TD
- TROY - Chris Anderson - 7 carries, 31 yards

Top receivers

- ULL - Javone Lawson - 8 receptions, 131 yards, TD
- TROY - Eric Thomas - 10 receptions, 96 yards, TD

=== North Texas ===
North Texas at Louisiana-Lafayette – Game summary

| Quarter | 1 | 2 | 3 | 4 | Total |
|---|---|---|---|---|---|
| Mean Green | 10 | 0 | 0 | 0 | 10 |
| Ragin' Cajuns | 7 | 6 | 0 | 17 | 30 |

at Cajun Field, Lafayette, LA

- Date: October 15
- Game time: 4:00 p.m. CST
- Game weather: 85 °F (29 °C); clear
- Game attendance: 32,823
- Referee: Jeff Hilyer
- TV: Ragin' Cajuns TV Network

Game information

First quarter

- UNT - Zach Olen 24-yard field goal, 10:42 (UNT 3-0)
- ULL - Ladarius Green 6-yard TD pass from Blaine Gautier, Brett Baer kick good, 8:34 (ULL 7-3)
- UNT - Lance Dunbar 2-yard TD run, Olen kick good, 0:09 (UNT 10-7)

Second quarter

- ULL - Green 25-yard TD pass from Gautier, Baer kick no good, 8:57 (ULL 13-10)

Fourth quarter

- ULL - Darryl Surgent 44-yard TD pass Gautier, Baer kick good, 14:53 (ULL 20-10)
- ULL - Javone Lawson 24-yard TD pass from Gautier, Baer kick good, 8:55 (ULL 27-10)
- ULL - Baer 31-yard field goal, 0:44 (ULL 30-10)

Top passers

- ULL - Blaine Gautier - 14/20, 238 yards, 4 TD
- UNT - Derek Thompson - 11/22, 86 yards, INT

Top rushers

- ULL - Alonzo Harris -18 carries, 56 yards
- UNT - Lance Dunbar - 19 carries, 53 yards, TD

Top receivers

- ULL - Darryl Surgent - 2 receptions, 109 yards, TD
- UNT - Drew Miller - 2 receptions, 50 yards

=== @ Western Kentucky ===
Louisiana-Lafayette at Western Kentucky – Game summary

| Quarter | 1 | 2 | 3 | 4 | Total |
|---|---|---|---|---|---|
| Ragin' Cajuns | 3 | 14 | 0 | 6 | 23 |
| Hilltoppers | 7 | 14 | 7 | 14 | 42 |

at Houchens Industries-L. T. Smith Stadium, Bowling Green, KY

- Date: October 22
- Game time: 3:00 p.m. CST
- Game weather: 64 °F (18 °C); sunny
- Game attendance: 15,122
- Referee: Charles Lewis

Game information

First quarter

- WKU - Bobby Rainey 1-yard TD run, Jesse Roy kick good, 11:39 (WKU 7-0)
- ULL - Brett Baer 22-yard field goal, 7:08 (WKU 7-3)

Second quarter

- WKU - Kadeem Jones 2-yard TD run, Roy kick good, 14:18 (WKU 14-3)
- ULL - Aaron Spikes 79-yard TD run, Baer kick good, 13:57 (WKU 14-10)
- WKU - Mitchell Henry 4-yard TD pass from Kawaun Jakes, Roy kick good, 2:23 (WKU 21-10)
- ULL - Ladarius Green 2-yard TD pass from Blaine Gautier, Baer kick good, 0:09 (WKU 21-17)

Third quarter

- WKU - Rainey 5-yard TD run, Roy kick good, 0:25 (WKU 28-17)

Fourth quarter

- ULL - Green 6-yard TD pass from Gautier, Baer kick no good, 14:21 (WKU 28-23)
- WKU - Jones 1-yard TD run, Roy kick good, 10:59 (WKU 35-23)
- WKU - Rainey 24-yard TD run, Roy kick good, 1:09 (WKU 42-23)

Top passers

- WKU - Kawaun Jakes - 15/18, 242 yards, TD, INT
- ULL - Blaine Gautier - 32/51, 419 yards, 2 TD, INT

Top rushers

- WKU - Bobby Rainey - 32 carries, 206 yards, 3 TD
- ULL - Aaron Spikes - 3 carries, 77 yards, TD

Top receivers

- WKU - Jack Doyle - 7 receptions, 106 yards
- ULL - Harry Peoples - 10 receptions, 140 yards

=== @ Middle Tennessee ===
Louisiana-Lafayette at Middle Tennessee – Game summary

| Quarter | 1 | 2 | 3 | 4 | Total |
|---|---|---|---|---|---|
| Ragin' Cajuns | 14 | 7 | 17 | 7 | 45 |
| Blue Raiders | 0 | 0 | 7 | 13 | 20 |

at Johnny "Red" Floyd Stadium, Murfreesboro, TN

- Date: October 29
- Game time: 6:30 p.m. CST
- Game weather: 53 °F (12 °C); clear, chilly
- Game attendance: 13,500
- Referee: Tony Backert
- TV: Sun Belt Network

Game information

First quarter

- ULL - Darryl Surgent 16-yard TD run, Brett Baer kick good, 7:23 (ULL 7-0)
- ULL - Devon Lewis-Buchanan 55-yard interception returned for TD, Baer kick good, 6:17 (ULL 14-0)

Second quarter

- ULL - Alonzo Harris 4-yard TD run, Baer kick good, 2:15 (ULL 21-0)

Third quarter

- ULL - Blaine Gautier 80-yard TD run, Baer kick good, 13:25 (ULL 28-0)
- MTSU - William Pratcher 6-yard TD run, Alan Gendreau kick good, 11:47 (ULL 28-7)
- ULL - Javone Lawson 39-yard TD pass from Gautier, Baer kick good, 10:22 (ULL 35-7)
- ULL - Baer 38-yard field goal, 1:44 (ULL 38-7)

Fourth quarter

- MTSU - Malcolm Beyah 14-yard TD pass from Logan Kilgore, Gendreau kick good, 14:14 (ULL 38-14)
- ULL - Harris 4-yard TD run, Baer kick good, 5:43 (ULL 45-14)
- MTSU - Kyle Griswould 13-yard TD run, Gendreau kick no good, 2:33 (ULL 45-20)

Top passers

- ULL - Blaine Gautier - 13/18, 139 yards, TD
- MTSU - Logan Kilgore - 22/40, 239 yards, TD, 2 INT

Top rushers

- ULL - Alonzo Harris - 33 carries, 189 yards, 2 TD
- MTSU - William Pratcher - 19 carries, 73 yards, TD

Top receivers

- ULL - Harry Peoples - 7 receptions, 76 yards
- MTSU - Malcolm Beyah - 7 receptions, 86 yards, TD

=== Louisiana-Monroe ===
Louisiana-Monroe at Louisiana-Lafayette – Game summary

| Quarter | 1 | 2 | 3 | 4 | Total |
|---|---|---|---|---|---|
| Warhawks | 14 | 0 | 7 | 14 | 35 |
| Ragin' Cajuns | 0 | 24 | 0 | 12 | 36 |

at Cajun Field, Lafayette, LA

- Date: November 5
- Game time: 2:30 p.m. CST
- Game weather: 70 °F (21 °C); sunny
- Game attendance: 28,176
- Referee: Chuck Lewis
- TV: Sun Belt Network

Game information

First quarter

- ULM - Kolton Browning 62-yard TD run, Justin Manton kick good, 11:34 (ULM 7-0)
- ULM - Jyruss Edwards 4-yard TD run, Manton kick good, 1:48 (ULM 14-0)

Second quarter

- ULL - Ladarius Green 22-yard TD pass from Blaine Gautier, Brett Baer kick good, 11:47 (ULM 14-7)
- ULL - Javone Lawson 17-yard TD pass from Gautier, Baer kick good, 7:38 (TIE 14-14)
- ULL - Green 43-yard TD pass from Gautier, Baer kick good, 5:23 (ULL 21-14)
- ULL - Baer 41-yard field goal, 0:03 (ULL 24-14)

Third quarter

- ULM - Edwards 5-yard TD run, Manton kick good, 12:15 (ULL 24-21)

Fourth quarter

- ULM - Edwards 12-yard TD pass from Browning, Manton kick good, 14:53 (ULM 28-24)
- ULM - Edwards 3-yard TD run, Manton kick good, 3:08 (ULM 35-24)
- ULL - Darryl Surgent 16-yard TD pass from Gautier, Gautier two-point conversion pass no good, 2:05 (ULM 35-30)
- ULL - Alonzo Harris 3-yard TD run, Harris two-point conversion run no good, 1:06 (ULL 36-35)

Top passers

- ULL - Blaine Gautier - 30/47, 355 yards, 4 TD
- ULM - Kolton Browning - 33/43, 258 yards, TD

Top rushers

- ULL - Blaine Gautier - 8 carries, 72 yards
- ULM - Kolton Browning - 11 carries, 100 yards, TD

Top receivers

- ULL - Ladarius Green - 13 receptions, 136 yards, 2 TD
- ULM - Brent Leonard - 7 receptions, 79 yards

=== @ Arkansas State ===
Louisiana-Lafayette at Arkansas State – Game summary

| Quarter | 1 | 2 | 3 | 4 | Total |
|---|---|---|---|---|---|
| Ragin' Cajuns | 0 | 7 | 14 | 0 | 21 |
| Red Wolves | 14 | 6 | 7 | 3 | 30 |

at ASU Stadium, Jonesboro, AR

- Date: November 12
- Game time: 2:00 p.m. CST
- Game weather: 63 °F (17 °C); partly cloudy, windy
- Game attendance: 20,261
- Referee: Riley Johnson

Game information

First quarter

- ARST - Taylor Stockemer 13-yard TD pass from Ryan Aplin, Brian Davis kick good, 11:44 (ARST 7-0)
- ARST - Stockemer 31-yard TD pass from Aplin, Davis kick good, 3:15 (ARST 14-0)

Second quarter

- ARST - Davis 22-yard field goal, 7:10 (ARST 17-0)
- ULL - Darryl Surgent 10-yard TD pass from Blaine Gautier, Brett Baer kick good, 0:53 (ARST 17-7)
- ARST - Davis 24-yard field goal, Baer kick good, 0:00 (ARST 20-7)

Third quarter

- ULL - Surgent 31-yard TD pass from Gautier, Baer kick good, 12:54 (ARST 20-14)
- ULL - Alonzo Harris 4-yard TD run, Baer kick good, 9:00 (ULL 21-20)
- ARST - Aplin 4-yard TD run, Baer kick good, 1:31 (ARST 27-21)

Fourth quarter

- ARST - Davis 21-yard field goal, 2:49 (ARST 30-21)

Top passers

- ARST - Ryan Aplin - 20/32, 226 yards, 2 TD
- ULL - Blaine Gautier - 19/38, 206 yards, 2 TD, 3 INT

Top rushers

- ARST - Ryan Aplin - 15 carries, 80 yards, TD
- ULL - Blaine Gautier - 17 carries, 82 yards

Top receivers

- ARST - Taylor Stockemer - 4 receptions, 85 yards, 2 TD
- ULL - Alonzo Harris - 7 receptions, 81 yards

=== @ Arizona ===
Louisiana-Lafayette at Arizona – Game summary

| Quarter | 1 | 2 | 3 | 4 | Total |
|---|---|---|---|---|---|
| Ragin' Cajuns | 7 | 6 | 3 | 21 | 37 |
| Wildcats | 0 | 21 | 10 | 14 | 45 |

at Arizona Stadium, Tucson, AZ

- Date: November 26
- Game time: 3:00 p.m. CST
- Game weather: 68 °F (20 °C); clear
- Game attendance: 38,819
- Referee: Land Clark

Game information

First quarter

- ULL - Harry Peoples 11-yard TD run, Brett Baer kick good, 9:18 (ULL 7-0)

Second quarter

- ARIZ - Taimi Tutogi 1-yard TD run, John Bonano kick good, 14:57 (TIE 7-7)
- ULL - Alonzo Harris 4-yard TD pass from Blaine Gautier, Baer kick no good, 9:14 (ULL 13-7)
- ARIZ - Juron Criner 9-yard TD pass from Nick Foles, Bonano kick good, 3:13 (ARIZ 14-13)
- ARIZ - David Douglas 12-yard TD pass from Foles, Bonano kick good, 0:34 (ARIZ 21-13)

Third quarter

- ARIZ - Daniel Jenkins 7-yard TD run, Bonano kick good, 7:46 (ARIZ 28-13)
- ULL - Baer 20-yard field goal, 5:21 (ARIZ 28-16)
- ARIZ - Bonano 39-yard field goal, 3:22 (ARIZ 31-16)

Fourth quarter

- ULL - Jermarlous Moten 41-yard interception returned for TD, Baer kick good, 13:47 (ARIZ 31-23)
- ARIZ - Keola Antolin 7-yard TD run, Bonano kick good, 13:28 (ARIZ 38-23)
- ULL - Harris 5-yard TD run, Baer kick good, 10:26 (ARIZ 38-30)
- ARIZ - Criner 35-yard TD pass from Foles, Bonano kick good, 6:08 (ARIZ 45-30)
- ULL - Gautier 10-yard TD run, Baer kick good, 5:05 (ARIZ 45-37)

Top passers

- ARIZ - Nick Foles - 33/43, 352 yards, 3 TD, INT
- ULL - Blaine Gautier - 24/36, 315 yards, TD

Top rushers

- ARIZ - Keola Antolin - 19 carries, 69 yards, TD
- ULL - Alonzo Harris - 13 carries, 45 yards, TD

Top receivers

- ARIZ - Juron Criner - 9 receptions, 129 yards, 2 TD
- ULL - Javone Lawson - 5 receptions, 137 yards

=== San Diego State (New Orleans Bowl) ===
San Diego State vs. Louisiana-Lafayette – Game summary

| Quarter | 1 | 2 | 3 | 4 | Total |
|---|---|---|---|---|---|
| Aztecs | 3 | 0 | 14 | 13 | 30 |
| Ragin' Cajuns | 6 | 7 | 6 | 13 | 32 |

at Mercedes-Benz Superdome, New Orleans, LA

- Date: December 17
- Game time: 8:00 p.m. CST
- Game weather: 69 °F (21 °C); N/A (indoors)
- Game attendance: 48,841
- Referee: Randy Christal
- TV: ESPN

Game information

First quarter

- SDSU - Abelardo Perez 27-yard field goal, 9:35 (SDSU 3-0)
- ULL - Javone Lawson 18-yard TD pass from Blaine Gautier, Brett Baer kick no good, (ULL 6-3)

Second quarter

- ULL - Darryl Surgent 87-yard punt return for TD, Baer kick good, 14:00 (ULL 13-3)

Third quarter

- ULL - Ladarius Green 20-yard TD pass from Gautier, Baer kick no good, 14:01 (ULL 19-3)
- SDSU - Colin Lockett 16-yard TD pass from Ryan Lindley, Perez kick good, 12:54 (ULL 19-10)
- SDSU - Lockett 16-yard TD pass from Lindley, Perez kick good, 3:40 (ULL 19-17)

Fourth quarter

- ULL - Lawson 11-yard TD pass from Gautier, Baer kick good, 12:48 (ULL 26-17)
- SDSU - Adam Muema 5-yard TD run, Perez kick good, 5:40 (ULL 26-24)
- ULL - Baer 22-yard field goal, 2:09 (ULL 29-24)
- SDSU - Lockett 12-yard TD pass from Lindley, Perez kick no good, 0:35 (SDSU 30-29)
- ULL - Baer 50-yard field goal, 0:00 (ULL 32-30)

Top passers

- ULL - Blaine Gautier - 24/40, 470 yards, 3 TD, INT
- SDSU - Ryan Lindley - 28/49, 413 yards, 3 TD

Top rushers

- ULL - Alonzo Harris - 14 carries, 62 yards
- SDSU - Ronnie Hillman - 24 carries, 55 yards

Top receivers

- ULL - Javone Lawson - 9 receptions, 193 yards, 2 TD
- SDSU - Dylan Denso - 5 receptions, 109 yards
