= Colin Lockett =

American football player and coach (born 1991)

UCLA Bruins
- Title: Wide receivers coach

Personal information
- Born: April 5, 1991 (age 35); Diamond Bar, California, U.S.
- Listed height: 5 ft 11 in (1.80 m)
- Listed weight: 188 lb (85 kg)

Career information
- High school: Diamond Bar High School
- College: San Diego State University
- NFL draft: 2014: undrafted

Career history

Playing
- Cincinnati Bengals (2014)*; Washington Redskins (2014–2015)*; BC Lions (2016)*
- * Offseason or practice squad member only

Coaching
- St. John Bosco HS (CA) (2017–2019) Defensive backs coach; San Diego State (2020) Graduate assistant; Washington (2021–2022) Defensive backs quality control coach; Oregon (2023) Graduate assistant; UC Davis (2024) Wide receivers coach; New Mexico (2025) Wide receivers coach; UCLA (2026) Wide receivers coach
- Stats at Pro Football Reference

Colin Lockett (born April 5, 1991) is an American college football coach and former wide receiver. He is the wide receivers coach for the University of California, Davis, a position he has held since 2024. He played college football at San Diego State University, and went undrafted in the 2014 NFL draft.

== College career ==
Lockett played collegiately in 48 games with 30 starts at San Diego State University from 2010 to 2013. Lockett redshirted the 2009 season. As a redshirt freshman in 2010, he made his debut against Nicholls State and made his first career tackle against Utah State. He played 11 games, primarily on defense and special teams, collecting seven more tackles. As a sophomore, he appeared in all 13 games, starting 11 of them. He caught 58 passes for 970 yards and eight touchdowns. He led San Diego State in kick returns, averaging 21.9 yards on 31 attempts. Lockett gained 1,744 all-purpose yards, good for second on his team. In his junior season, Lockett played in 12 games and made seven starts. He caught 20 passes for 293 yards and three touchdowns. Of the team's 42 kickoffs during the season, he returned 31 of them, averaging 25.9 yards per return and scoring two of them. As a senior and team captain in 2013, played and started in 12 games and had 52 catches for 736 yards and five touchdowns. He returned 31 kickoffs for 761 yards, and averaged 24.5 per. He was named an Honorable Mention All-Mountain West selection on special teams by coaches and media.

== Professional career ==
=== Cincinnati Bengals ===
After going undrafted in the 2014 NFL draft, the Cincinnati Bengals signed Lockett on May 10, 2014. On August 30, the Bengals released Lockett with a plan to re-sign him to their practice squad. On October 14, Cincinnati released Lockett from their practice squad.

=== Washington Redskins ===
On December 22, 2014, the Washington Redskins signed Lockett to their practice squad. A week later, he was signed to a futures contract.

On September 5, 2015, the Redskins waived Lockett for final roster cuts before the start of the 2015 season. On October 16, he was once again added to the practice squad to later be cut on October 26. On December 21, Lockett was re-signed to their practice squad.

=== BC Lions ===
On March 21, 2016, Colin Lockett and the BC Lions of the Canadian Football League agreed to a contract. He was released by the team on June 12, 2016.

== Coaching career ==
In 2017, Lockett was hired as the defensive backs coach for St. John Bosco High School.

In 2020, Lockett joined San Diego State as a graduate assistant.

In 2021, Lockett was hired as the defensive backs quality control coach for Washington.

In 2023, Lockett joined Oregon as a graduate assistant.

In 2024, Lockett was hired as the wide receivers coach for UC Davis.

In December 2024, Lockett joined the University of New Mexico as the wide receivers coach.

Lockett also coached in the greater Los Angeles area with the private coaching service, CoachUp.
