= Louisiana–Monroe Warhawks football statistical leaders =

The Louisiana–Monroe Warhawks football statistical leaders are individual statistical leaders of the Louisiana–Monroe Warhawks football program in various categories, including passing, rushing, receiving, total offense, defensive stats, and kicking. Within those areas, the lists identify single-game, single-season, and career leaders. The Warhawks represent the University of Louisiana at Monroe in the NCAA's Sun Belt Conference.

Louisiana-Monroe began competing in intercollegiate football in 1951. However, these lists are dominated by more recent players for several reasons:

- Since 1951, seasons have increased from 10 games to 11 and then 12 games in length.
- The NCAA didn't allow freshmen to play varsity football until 1972 (with the exception of the World War II years), allowing players to have four-year careers.
- Bowl games only began counting toward single-season and career statistics in 2002. The Warhawks have played in one bowl game since then, the 2012 Independence Bowl. Sure enough, the 2012 season has more entries on these lists than any other season.

These lists are updated through the end of the 2025 season.

== Passing ==
=== Passing yards ===
Career
Rk	Player	Yards	Years
1	Kolton Browning	10,263	2010 2011 2012 2013
2	Caleb Evans	9,513	2016 2017 2018 2019
3	Steven Jyles	8,987	2002 2003 2004 2005
4	John Holman	7,827	1979 1980 1981 1982
5	Raymond Philyaw	7,061	1993 1994 1995 1996
6	Doug Pederson	6,315	1987 1988 1989 1990
7	Kinsmon Lancaster	5,749	2005 2006 2007 2008
8	Stan Humphries	4,395	1986 1987
9	Andy Chance	3,530	1999 2000 2001
10	Wendal Lowrey	3,499	1991 1992

Single season
Rk	Player	Yards	Year
1	Pete Thomas	3,181	2014
2	Kolton Browning	3,049	2012
3	Robert Cobb	3,008	1993
4	John Holman	2,964	1982
5	Caleb Evans	2,942	2019
6	Bubby Brister	2,880	1985
7	Caleb Evans	2,869	2018
8	Caleb Evans	2,868	2017
9	Raymond Philyaw	2,627	1995
10	Stan Humphries	2,622	1987

Single game
Rk	Player	Yards	Year	Opponent
1	Doug Pederson	619	1989	Stephen F. Austin
2	Stan Humphries	486	1987	Eastern Kentucky
	Raymond Philyaw	486	1995	Nevada
4	Raymond Philyaw	479	1996	Central Florida
5	Pete Thomas	472	2014	Louisiana-Lafayette
6	Steven Jyles	470	2002	Utah State
7	John Holman	461	1980	McNeese State
8	Stan Humphries	436	1987	Marshall
9	Kolton Browning	412	2012	Arkansas
10	Wendal Lowrey	402	1992	Eastern Washington

=== Passing touchdowns ===
Career
Rk	Player	TDs	Years
1	Kolton Browning	81	2010 2011 2012 2013
2	Caleb Evans	58	2016 2017 2018 2019
3	Steven Jyles	55	2002 2003 2004 2005
4	Raymond Philyaw	52	1993 1994 1995 1996
5	John Holman	51	1979 1980 1981 1982
6	Kinsmon Lancaster	38	2005 2006 2007 2008
7	Doug Pederson	33	1987 1988 1989 1990
8	Stan Humphries	29	1986 1987
	Robert Cobb	29	1990 1991 1992 1993
10	Garrett Smith	27	2015 2016

Single season
Rk	Player	TDs	Year
1	Robert Cobb	29	1993
	Kolton Browning	29	2012
3	Raymond Philyaw	22	1995
4	Kolton Browning	21	2013
	Caleb Evans	21	2019
6	John Holman	20	1982
7	Stan Humphries	18	1987
	Kinsmon Lancaster	18	2008
	Kolton Browning	18	2010
10	Bubby Brister	17	1985
	Andre Vige	17	1998
	Steven Jyles	17	2002
	Garrett Smith	17	2015
	Caleb Evans	17	2017

Single game
Rk	Player	TDs	Year	Opponent
1	Doug Pederson	5	1989	Stephen F. Austin
	Wendal Lowrey	5	1992	McNeese State
	Raymond Philyaw	5	1995	Nevada
	Andre Vige	5	1998	Portland State
	Kolton Browning	5	2010	North Texas
	Kolton Browning	5	2013	Troy

== Rushing ==
=== Rushing yards ===
Career
Rk	Player	Yards	Years
1	Calvin Dawson	3,378	2004 2005 2006 2007
2	Roosevelt Potts	3,061	1990 1991 1992
3	Frank Goodin	2,943	2007 2008 2009 2010
4	Joe Profit	2,818	1967 1968 1969 1970
5	Nathan Johnson	2,330	1977 1978 1979 1980
6	Caleb Evans	2,168	2016 2017 2018 2019
7	Jyruss Edwards	1,927	2010 2011 2012 2013
8	Lloyd Ray Smith	1,738	1953 1957 1958
9	Tommy Minvielle	1,661	1985 1986 1987 1988
10	Van Lambert	1,658	1968 1969 1970 1971

Single season
Rk	Player	Yards	Year
1	Irving Spikes	1,563	1993
2	Calvin Dawson	1,414	2007
3	Ahmad Hardy	1,351	2024
4	Jimmy Edwards	1,328	1972
5	Josh Johnson	1,298	2019
6	Calvin Dawson	1,210	2006
7	Frank Goodin	1,126	2009
8	Roosevelt Potts	1,103	1991
9	Bryant Jacobs	1,043	2002
10	Joe Profit	1,027	1969

Single game
Rk	Player	Yards	Year	Opponent
1	Irving Spikes	254	1993	North Texas
2	Greg Robinson	250	1992	Alcorn State
3	Irving Spikes	235	1993	Arkansas State
4	Irving Spikes	231	1993	Idaho
5	Jimmy Edwards	215	1972	Southeastern Louisiana
6	Ahmad Hardy	207	2024	Marshall
7	Ahmad Hardy	204	2024	Arkansas State
8	Thomas Koufie	201	2016	Georgia State
9	Joe Profit	192	1970	Northwestern State
10	Jyruss Edwards	191	2011	Middle Tennessee

=== Rushing touchdowns ===
Career
Rk	Player	TDs	Years
1	Caleb Evans	36	2016 2017 2018 2019
2	Calvin Dawson	30	2004 2005 2006 2007
3	Frank Goodin	25	2007 2008 2009 2010
4	Jyruss Edwards	23	2010 2011 2012 2013
5	Greg Robinson	22	1991 1992
6	Steven Jyles	21	2002 2003 2004 2005
7	Joe Profit	19	1967 1968 1969 1970
8	Nathan Johnson	18	1977 1978 1979 1980
	Eric Foster	18	1993 1994 1995
	Kolton Browning	18	2010 2011 2012 2013

Single season
Rk	Player	TDs	Year
1	Irving Spikes	14	1993
2	Greg Robinson	13	1992
	Frank Goodin	13	2009
	Caleb Evans	13	2017
	Ahmad Hardy	13	2024
6	Calvin Dawson	12	2007
	Caleb Evans	12	2019
8	Roosevelt Potts	11	1992
	Calvin Dawson	11	2006
	Jyruss Edwards	11	2011
	Josh Johnson	11	2019

Single game
Rk	Player	TDs	Year	Opponent
1	Thomas Koufie	5	2016	Georgia State
2	Marquis Williams	4	1997	Louisiana-Lafayette

== Receiving ==
=== Receptions ===
Career
Rk	Player	Rec	Years
1	Brent Leonard	209	2009 2010 2011 2012
2	Mack Vincent	203	2000 2001 2002 2003
	Marcus Green	203	2015 2016 2017 2018
4	Rashon Ceaser	193	2012 2013 2014 2015
5	Tavarese Maye	191	2010 2011 2012 2013
6	Cisco Richard	179	1987 1988 1989 1990
7	Marty Booker	178	1995 1996 1997 1998
8	Ajalen Holley	172	2013 2014 2015 2016
9	Stepfret Williams	168	1992 1993 1994 1995
	Darrell McNeal	168	2006 2007 2008 2009

Single season
Rk	Player	Rec	Year
1	Brent Leonard	104	2012
2	Mack Vincent	79	2002
	Kenzee Jackson	79	2014
4	Rashon Ceaser	77	2014
5	Marty Booker	75	1998
6	Brent Leonard	69	2011
7	Stepfret Williams	66	1995
8	Cisco Richard	65	1990
	Luther Ambrose	65	2010
	Rashon Ceaser	65	2013

Single game
Rk	Player	Rec	Year	Opponent
1	Jackie Harris	16	1988	Lamar
2	Brent Leonard	14	2012	Arkansas State
3	Brent Leonard	13	2011	TCU
	Brent Leonard	13	2012	FIU
	Kenzee Jackson	13	2014	New Mexico State
	Rashon Ceaser	13	2015	Georgia
7	Chris Jones	12	1981	Northwestern State
	Stepfret Williams	12	1995	Mississippi State
	Rashon Ceaser	12	2014	Troy
	Marcus Green	12	2015	Troy
	Marcus Green	12	2015	Hawaii
	Tyrone Howell	12	2022	Texas State

=== Receiving yards ===
Career
Rk	Player	Yards	Years
1	Stepfret Williams	3,177	1992 1993 1994 1995
2	Marty Booker	2,784	1995 1996 1997 1998
3	Marcus Green	2,726	2015 2016 2017 2018
4	Mack Vincent	2,673	2000 2001 2002 2003
5	Rashon Ceaser	2,423	2012 2013 2014 2015
6	Brent Leonard	2,292	2009 2010 2011 2012
7	John Floyd	2,238	1975 1976 1977 1978
8	Ajalen Holley	2,148	2013 2014 2015 2016
9	Jackie Harris	2,107	1986 1987 1988 1989
10	Tavarese Maye	2,104	2010 2011 2012 2013

Single season
Rk	Player	Yards	Year
1	Mack Vincent	1,198	2002
2	Marty Booker	1,168	1998
3	Brent Leonard	1,118	2012
4	Stepfret Williams	1,106	1994
5	Stepfret Williams	1,056	1995
6	Vincent Brisby	1,050	1992
7	John Floyd	986	1976
8	Rashon Ceaser	964	2013
9	Stepfret Williams	929	1993
10	Rashon Ceaser	875	2014

Single game
Rk	Player	Yards	Year	Opponent
1	Stepfret Williams	264	1995	Nevada
2	Tyrone Howell	244	2022	South Alabama
3	Vincent Brisby	227	1992	Louisiana-Lafayette
4	Bobby Craighead	222	1981	Southeastern Louisiana
5	Marty Booker	218	1996	Central Florida
6	Chris Jones	214	1981	Northwestern State
7	Jeff Steele	206	1989	Stephen F. Austin
	Vincent Brisby	206	1991	Stephen F. Austin
9	John Floyd	203	1976	West Texas A&M
10	Vincent Brisby	200	1992	Eastern Washington

=== Receiving touchdowns ===
Career
Rk	Player	TDs	Years
1	Stepfret Williams	33	1992 1993 1994 1995
2	Marcus Green	24	2015 2016 2017 2018
3	Marty Booker	23	1995 1996 1997 1998
4	Drouzon Quillen	19	2002 2004 2005
	Ajalen Holley	19	2013 2014 2015 2016
6	Mack Vincent	18	2000 2001 2002 2003
7	Vincent Brisby	17	1990 1991 1992
	Brent Leonard	17	2009 2010 2011 2012
9	Rubin Jones	16	1968 1969 1970 1972
	Darrell McNeal	16	2006 2007 2008 2009

Single season
Rk	Player	TDs	Year
1	Stepfret Williams	12	1995
2	Marty Booker	11	1998
3	Stepfret Williams	10	1993
	Stepfret Williams	10	1994
	Brent Leonard	10	2012
6	Rubin Jones	9	1971
	Alfred Kinney	9	1981
	Vincent Brisby	9	1992
	Mack Vincent	9	2003
	Drouzon Quillen	9	2005
	Josh Pederson	9	2019

Single game
Rk	Player	TDs	Year	Opponent
1	Stepfret Williams	4	1995	Nevada
	Brent Leonard	4	2012	South Alabama

== Total offense ==
Total offense is the sum of passing and rushing statistics. It does not include receiving or returns.

=== Total offense yards ===
Career
Rk	Player	Yards	Years
1	Kolton Browning	11,808	2010 2011 2012 2013
2	Steven Jyles	10,234	2002 2003 2004 2005
3	John Holman	7,802	1979 1980 1981 1982
4	Kinsmon Lancaster	7,306	2005 2006 2007 2008
5	Raymond Philyaw	7,019	1993 1994 1995 1996
6	Doug Pederson	6,092	1987 1988 1989 1990
7	Stan Humphries	4,482	1986 1987
8	Andy Chance	4,102	1999 2000 2001
9	Garrett Smith	3,828	2015 2016
10	Wendal Lowrey	3,504	1991 1992

Single season
Rk	Player	Yards	Year
1	Kolton Browning	3,537	2012
2	Pete Thomas	3,187	2014
3	Robert Cobb	2,965	1993
4	Kolton Browning	2,925	2011
5	Kolton Browning	2,937	2010
6	Steven Jyles	2,909	2004
7	John Holman	2,841	1982
8	Stan Humphries	2,768	1987
9	Chandler Rogers	2,756	2022
10	Bubby Brister	2,704	1985

Single game
Rk	Player	Yards	Year	Opponent
1	Doug Pederson	595	1989	Stephen F. Austin
2	Stan Humphries	521	1987	Eastern Kentucky
3	Steven Jyles	495	2002	Utah State
4	Raymond Philyaw	487	1995	Nevada
5	Kolton Browning	481	2012	Arkansas
6	Raymond Philyaw	452	1996	Central Florida
7	Pete Thomas	443	2014	Louisiana-Lafayette
8	John Holman	439	1980	McNeese State
9	Steven Jyles	432	2005	FIU
10	Raymond Philyaw	424	1995	Northwestern State

=== Touchdowns responsible for ===
"Touchdowns responsible for" is the official NCAA term for combined passing and rushing touchdowns.

Career
Rk	Player	TDs	Years
1	Kolton Browning	99	2010 2011 2012 2013
2	Caleb Evans	94	2016 2017 2018 2019
3	Steven Jyles	76	2002 2003 2004 2005
4	Raymond Philyaw	57	1993 1994 1995 1996
5	Kinsmon Lancaster	49	2005 2006 2007 2008

Single season
Rk	Player	TDs	Year
1	Kolton Browning	36	2012
2	Robert Cobb	29	1993
3	Kolton Browning	23	2013
4	Stan Humphries	22	1987
	Raymond Philyaw	22	1995
	Kinsmon Lancaster	22	2008
	Kolton Browning	22	2010
8	Steven Jyles	21	2005

Single game
Rk	Player	TDs	Year	Opponent
1	Kolton Browning	6	2012	Western Kentucky
	Kolton Browning	6	2013	Troy

== Defense ==
=== Interceptions ===
Career
Rk	Player	Ints	Years
1	Greg James	17	2006 2007 2008 2009
2	Vic Minor	15	1979 1980 1981 1982
3	David Dumars	14	1975 1976 1977 1979
	Pat Dennis	13	1997 1998 1999
	Chris Harris	13	2001 2002 2003 2004
6	Jody Norman	12	1978 1979 1980 1981
	Mike Howard	12	1981 1982 1983 1984
	Mike Turner	12	1982 1983 1984 1985
	Cyril Crutchfield	12	1985 1986 1987 1988

Single season
Rk	Player	Ints	Year
1	Spencer Ellison	7	1989
	Pat Dennis	7	1998
	Chris Harris	7	2004

Single game
Rk	Player	Ints	Year	Opponent
1	Pat Mayo	3	1952	Livingston State
	Wayne Matherne	3	1968	Stephen F. Austin
	Jody Norman	3	1980	Northwestern State
	Mike Howard	3	1982	McNeese State
	Darrell Slater	3	1984	Nicholls State
	Karlton Washington	3	1999	Northwestern State
	Greg James	3	2009	North Texas

=== Tackles ===
Career
Rk	Player	Tackles	Years
1	Harold Thompson	509	1976 1977 1978 1979
2	Rod Moon	397	1987 1988 1989 1990
3	Ronnie Washington	396	1982 1983 1984
4	Chris Harris	383	2001 2002 2003 2004
5	Cardia Jackson	381	2006 2007 2008 2009
6	Ricky Sanders	367	1979 1980 1981 1982
7	Terry Jones	360	1984 1985 1986 1987
8	Cyril Crutchfield	352	1985 1986 1987 1988
9	Glenn Fleming	323	1973 1974 1975
10	Brian Taylor	316	1995 1996 1997 1998

Single season
Rk	Player	Tackles	Year
1	Harold Thompson	175	1977
2	Ronnie Washington	160	1984
3	Brian Taylor	144	1998
4	Roger Kelly	140	1985
5	Glenn Fleming	139	1975
	Roy Binion	139	1977
7	Roy Binion	134	1978
	Terry Jones	134	1987
9	Hunter Kissinger	133	2015
10	Ricky Sanders	132	1981
	Ronnie Washington	132	1983

Single game
Rk	Player	Tackles	Year	Opponent
1	Conrad Clarks	25	1994	Nevada
2	Harold Thompson	24	1977	Tulsa
	Brian Taylor	24	1998	Stephen F. Austin
4	Ross Davis	23	1969	Chattanooga
	Roy Binion	23	1977	Tulsa
	Ronnie Washington	23	1984	Southeastern Louisiana
7	Larry Hathorn	22	1976	McNeese State
	Mike Turner	22	1985	Texas A&M
9	Roy Binion	21	1978	Cincinnati
	Mike Turner	21	1985	McNeese State

=== Sacks ===
Career
Rk	Player	Sacks	Years
1	James Folston	27.0	1990 1991 1992 1993
2	Anthony Williams	26.0	1987 1988 1989 1990
3	Jonathan Foster	24.0	1996 1997 1998 1999
4	Aaron Morgan	22.0	2006 2007 2008 2009
5	Brandon Guillory	21.5	2002 2003 2004 2005
6	Steve Foley	19.5	1995 1996 1997
7	Bruce Daigle	18.0	1981 1982 1983
	Will Johnson	18.0	1983 1984 1985 1986
9	Ted Jones	16.0	1982 1983 1984 1985 1986
10	Lionel Barnes	16.0	1998

Single season
Rk	Player	Sacks	Year
1	Steve Foley	18.5	1997
2	Lionel Barnes	16.0	1998
3	Anthony Williams	13.0	1990
4	James Folston	12.0	1992
	Jonathan Foster	12.0	1999
6	Brandon Guillory	10.5	2005
7	Bruce Daigle	10.0	1982
8	Bennie Jones	9.0	1983
	Will Johnson	9.0	1984
	Aaron Morgan	9.0	2009

Single game
Rk	Player	Sacks	Year	Opponent
1	Steve Foley	5.5	1997	Central Florida

== Kicking ==
=== Field goals made ===
Career
Rk	Player	FGs	Years
1	Teddy Garcia	56	1984 1985 1986 1987
2	Rob Tallent	40	1989 1990 1991 1992
3	Justin Manton	36	2011 2012 2013 2014
4	Cole Wilson	29	2004 2005 2006 2007
5	Radi Jabour	26	2007 2008 2009 2010 2011
	Calum Sutherland	26	2021 2022

Single season
Rk	Player	FGs	Year
1	Teddy Garcia	20	1987
	Justin Manton	20	2014

Single game
Rk	Player	FGs	Year	Opponent
1	Bubba Toups	4	1980	Mississippi College
	Teddy Garcia	4	1987	Georgia Southern
	Roger Miller	4	1993	McNeese State
	Calum Sutherland	4	2021	Jackson State

=== Field goal percentage ===
Career
Rk	Player	FG%	Years
1	Derek McCormick	83.3%	2022 2023
2	Max Larson	82.4%	2024
3	Calum Sutherland	81.3%	2021 2022
4	Roger Miller	76.9%	1993 1994

Single season
Rk	Player	FG%	Year
1	Cole Wilson	93.3%	2006
