= 2011 FIU Panthers football team =

American college football season

2011 FIU Panthers football

Beef 'O' Brady's Bowl vs Marshall, L 10–20
- Conference: Sun Belt Conference
- Record: 8–5 (5–3 Sun Belt)
- Head coach: Mario Cristobal (5th season)
- Offensive coordinator: Scott Satterfield (2nd season)
- Offensive scheme: Spread option
- Defensive coordinator: Todd Orlando (1st season)
- Base defense: 3–3–5
- Home stadium: FIU Stadium

2011 Sun Belt Conference football standings
	Conf.			Overall
Team	W		L	W		L
Arkansas State $	8	–	0	10	–	3
Western Kentucky	7	–	1	7	–	5
FIU	5	–	3	8	–	5
North Texas	4	–	4	5	–	7
Louisiana–Monroe	3	–	5	4	–	8
Troy	2	–	6	3	–	9
Louisiana–Lafayette *	1	–	2	1	–	4
Middle Tennessee	1	–	7	2	–	10
Florida Atlantic	0	–	8	1	–	11
$ – Conference champion; * – Louisiana–Lafayette vacated 8 wins including 5 in conference due to NCAA violations.

The 2011 FIU Panthers football team represented Florida International University in the 2011 NCAA Division I FBS football season. The Golden Panthers were led by fifth-year head coach Mario Cristobal and played their home games at FIU Stadium in Miami, Florida. They are members of the Sun Belt Conference. They finished the season 8–5, 5–3 in Sun Belt play to finish in fourth place. They were invited to the Beef 'O' Brady's Bowl where they were defeated by Marshall 10–20.

== Schedule ==
Date	Time	Opponent	Site	TV	Result	Attendance
September 1	7:00 p.m.	North Texas	FIU Stadium; Miami, FL	ESPN3	W 41–16	17,568
September 9	7:00 p.m.	at Louisville*	Papa John's Cardinal Stadium; Louisville, KY	ESPN	W 24–17	47,228
September 17	6:00 p.m.	UCF*	FIU Stadium; Miami, FL	ESPN3	W 17–10	20,205
September 24	6:00 p.m.	Louisiana–Lafayette	FIU Stadium; Miami, FL	ESPN3	L 31–36	16,780
October 1	7:00 p.m.	Duke*^{†}	FIU Stadium; Miami, FL	ESPNU	L 27–31	22,682
October 8	2:00 p.m.	at Akron*	InfoCision Stadium – Summa Field; Akron, OH		W 27–17	16,016
October 18	8:00 p.m.	at Arkansas State	ASU Stadium; Jonesboro, AR	ESPN2	L 16–34	15,573
October 25	8:00 p.m.	Troy	FIU Stadium; Miami, FL	ESPN2	W 23–20 ^{OT}	15,852
November 5	4:00 p.m.	at Western Kentucky	Houchens Industries–L. T. Smith Stadium; Bowling Green, KY		L 9–10	15,293
November 12	6:00 p.m.	Florida Atlantic	FIU Stadium; Miami, FL (Shula Bowl)		W 41–7	17,378
November 19	4:00 p.m.	at Louisiana–Monroe	Malone Stadium; Monroe, LA		W 28–17	10,587
November 26	3:30 p.m.	at Middle Tennessee	Johnny "Red" Floyd Stadium; Murfreesboro, TN		W 31–18	10,227
December 20	8:00 p.m.	vs. Marshall*	Tropicana Field; Saint Petersburg, FL (Beef 'O' Brady's Bowl)	ESPN	L 10–20	20,072
*Non-conference game; ^{†}Homecoming; All times are in Eastern time

== Attendance record ==
The UCF game broke attendance records at FIU Stadium with a crowd of 20,205. This record was again broken two weeks later at the FIU Homecoming game versus Duke University on October 1, 2011, with a crowd of 22,628. Additionally, the Goodyear Blimp made its first appearance at FIU Stadium, flying over the stadium throughout the Duke homecoming game. The Miami Tower in Downtown Miami was lit in blue and gold throughout the week of September 26, 2011 to October 1, 2011 in honor of FIU's homecoming.

== Game summaries ==
=== Duke University ===
FIU played against Duke University on October 1, 2011 at the FIU Homecoming at FIU Stadium. FIU lost 27–31 in a game where FIU had 589 total yards compared to Duke's 323.

=== Marshall (Beef 'O' Brady's Bowl) ===
	1	2	3	4	Total
FIU	7	3	0	0	10
Marshall	3	7	0	10	20

The Golden Panthers, going bowling for the second year in a row, are led by sophomore running back Kedrick Rhodes with 1,121 rushing yards in a season, ranks second in school history. Rhodes has also caught 26 passes for 248 yards in the passing game.

== 2012 NFL draft ==
Player	Round	Pick	Position	NFL club
T. Y. Hilton	3	92	Wide receiver	Indianapolis Colts
