= 2010 Louisiana–Monroe Warhawks football team =

American college football season

2010 Louisiana–Monroe Warhawks football
- Conference: Sun Belt Conference
- Record: 5–7 (4–4 Sun Belt)
- Head coach: Todd Berry (1st season)
- Offensive coordinator: Steve Farmer (3rd season)
- Offensive scheme: Spread
- Defensive coordinator: Troy Reffett (2nd season)
- Base defense: 3–3–5
- Home stadium: Malone Stadium

2010 Sun Belt Conference football standings
	Conf.			Overall
Team	W		L	W		L
Troy +	6	–	2	8	–	5
FIU +	6	–	2	7	–	6
Middle Tennessee	5	–	3	6	–	7
Louisiana–Monroe	4	–	4	5	–	7
Arkansas State	4	–	4	4	–	8
Florida Atlantic	3	–	5	4	–	8
Louisiana–Lafayette	3	–	5	3	–	9
North Texas	3	–	5	3	–	9
Western Kentucky	2	–	6	2	–	10
+ – Conference co-champions

The 2010 Louisiana–Monroe Warhawks football team represented the University of Louisiana at Monroe in the 2010 NCAA Division I FBS football season. The Warhawks, members of the Sun Belt Conference, were led by first-year head coach Todd Berry and played their home games at Malone Stadium. They finished the season 5–7, 4–4 in Sun Belt play.

== Schedule ==
Date	Time	Opponent	Site	TV	Result	Attendance	Source
September 11	6:00 pm	at No. 14 Arkansas*	War Memorial Stadium; Little Rock, AR	FSN	L 7–31	55,705	
September 18	6:00 pm	at Arkansas State	ASU Stadium; Jonesboro, AR	CST/CSS	L 20–34	23,176	
September 25	6:00 pm	Southeastern Louisiana*	Malone Stadium; Monroe, LA		W 21–20	15,285	
October 2	11:00 am	at No. 10 Auburn*	Jordan–Hare Stadium; Auburn, AL	ESPNU	L 3–52	80,759	
October 9	6:00 pm	Florida Atlantic	Malone Stadium; Monroe, LA		W 20–17	16,513	
October 16	6:00 pm	at Western Kentucky	Houchens Industries–L. T. Smith Stadium; Bowling Green, KY		W 35–30	15,142	
October 23	3:30 pm	at Middle Tennessee	Johnny "Red" Floyd Stadium; Murfreesboro, TN	ESPN3	L 10–38	19,052	
October 30	2:30 pm	Troy^{†}	Malone Stadium; Monroe, LA	CST/CSS	W 28–14	19,980	
November 6	5:00 pm	at FIU	FIU Stadium; Miami, FL		L 35–42 ^{2OT}	17,301	
November 13	7:00 pm	at No. 5 LSU*	Tiger Stadium; Baton Rouge, LA	PPV	L 0–51	92,518	
November 20	2:30 pm	North Texas	Malone Stadium; Monroe, LA		W 49–37	8,905	
November 27	2:30 pm	Louisiana–Lafayette	Malone Stadium; Monroe, LA (Battle on the Bayou)		L 22–23	9,215	
*Non-conference game; ^{†}Homecoming; Rankings from Coaches' Poll released prior to the game; All times are in Central time; Source:

== Game summaries ==
=== Vs. No. 15 Arkansas ===
Louisiana–Monroe vs. No. 15 Arkansas

Team	1	2	3	4	Total
UL–Monroe	0	0	0	7	7
• No. 15 Arkansas	7	0	7	17	31

- Date: September 11
- Location: War Memorial Stadium • Little Rock, AR
- Game start: 6:00 p.m. CST
- Elapsed time: 3h 3m
- Game attendance: 55,705
- Game weather: 84°, scattered showers
- Referee: Marc Curles

Scoring summary
Q1	5:48	ARK	Childs 19 pass from Mallett (Hocker kick)	ARK 7–0
Q3	6:12	ARK	Mallett 1 run (Hocker kick)	ARK 14–0
Q4	12:53	ARK	Hocker 26 FG	ARK 17–0
Q4	8:46	ARK	Childs 18 pass from Mallett (Hocker kick)	ARK 24–0
Q4	5:12	ULM	Ambrose 25 pass from Browning (Jabour kick)	ARK 24–7
Q4	3:23	ARK	Wingo 35 pass from Mallett (Hocker kick)	ARK 31–7
