= 2012 Louisiana–Monroe Warhawks football team =

American college football season

2012 Louisiana–Monroe Warhawks football

Independence Bowl, L 14–45 vs. Ohio
- Conference: Sun Belt Conference
- Record: 8–5 (6–2 Sun Belt)
- Head coach: Todd Berry (3rd season)
- Offensive coordinator: Steve Farmer (5th season)
- Offensive scheme: Spread
- Defensive coordinator: Troy Reffett (4th season)
- Base defense: 3–3–5
- Home stadium: Malone Stadium

2012 Sun Belt Conference football standings
	Conf.			Overall
Team	W		L	W		L
Arkansas State $	7	–	1	10	–	3
Louisiana–Monroe	6	–	2	8	–	5
Middle Tennessee	6	–	2	8	–	4
Louisiana–Lafayette *	4	–	2	5	–	4
Western Kentucky	4	–	4	7	–	6
Troy	3	–	5	5	–	7
North Texas	3	–	5	4	–	8
Florida Atlantic	2	–	6	3	–	9
FIU	2	–	6	3	–	9
South Alabama **	1	–	7	2	–	11
$ – Conference champion; * – Louisiana–Lafayette vacated 4 wins due to NCAA violations. ** – South Alabama was ineligible for the conference title or a bowl game as part of their transition to the FBS.

The 2012 Louisiana–Monroe Warhawks football team represented the University of Louisiana at Monroe in the 2012 NCAA Division I FBS football season. The Warhawks were led by third-year head coach Todd Berry and played their home games at Malone Stadium. They were a member of the Sun Belt Conference. They finished the season 8–5, 6–2 in Sun Belt play to finish in a three-way tie for second place. They were invited to the Independence Bowl, the first bowl appearance in school history, where they were defeated by Ohio.

== Schedule ==
Date	Time	Opponent	Site	TV	Result	Attendance
September 8	6:00 pm	at No. 8 Arkansas*	War Memorial Stadium; Little Rock, AR	ESPNU	W 34–31 ^{OT}	53,089
September 15	11:00 am	at Auburn*	Jordan–Hare Stadium; Auburn, AL	SECN	L 28–31 ^{OT}	85,214
September 21	7:00 pm	Baylor*	Malone Stadium; Monroe, LA	ESPN	L 42–47	31,175^{A}
September 29	3:30 pm	at Tulane*	Mercedes-Benz Superdome; New Orleans, LA	CST	W 63–10	18,063
October 6	2:30 pm	at Middle Tennessee	Johnny "Red" Floyd Stadium; Murfreesboro, TN	SBN/CSS	W 31–17	21,067
October 13	7:00 pm	Florida Atlantic	Malone Stadium; Monroe, LA	SBN/CSS	W 35–14	16,782
October 20	3:00 pm	at Western Kentucky	Houchens Industries–L. T. Smith Stadium; Bowling Green, KY	ESPN3	W 43–42 ^{OT}	22,323
October 27	6:00 pm	South Alabama	Malone Stadium; Monroe, LA		W 38–24	14,556
November 3	3:00 pm	Louisiana–Lafayette	Malone Stadium; Monroe, LA (Battle on the Bayou)	SBN/CSS	L 24–40	20,203
November 8	6:00 pm	at Arkansas State	Liberty Bank Stadium; Jonesboro, AR	ESPNU	L 23–45	30,243
November 17	3:00 pm	North Texas	Malone Stadium; Monroe, LA		W 42–16	14,079
November 24	5:00 pm	at FIU	FIU Stadium; Miami, FL		W 23–17 ^{OT}	12,115
December 28	1:00 pm	vs. Ohio*	Independence Stadium; Shreveport, LA (Independence Bowl)	ESPN	L 14–45	41,853
*Non-conference game; Rankings from AP Poll; All times are in Central time

Schedule source:

- ^A Denotes the largest crowd in Malone Stadium history.

== Game summaries ==
=== @ Arkansas ===
	1	2	3	4	OT	Total
Warhawks	7	0	7	14	6	34
#8 Razorbacks	7	14	7	0	3	31

The Warhawks came into War Memorial Stadium as 30.5 point underdogs. In regulation, the Warhawks played the Razorbacks to a tie. Arkansas, who had three starters (including QB Tyler Wilson) injured in the game, was held to a field goal in the 1st overtime. ULM faced a 4th and 1 in same overtime period, and elected to pursue a first down. The result was a ULM QB Kolton Browning game-winning touchdown run. Browning finished with 481 total yards, three touchdowns passing, and one touchdown rushing.

Louisiana-Monroe's victory over #8 Arkansas marked the first victory by any Sun Belt Conference team over a top-ten opponent and the first victory over any ranked opponent since 2004.

=== @ Auburn ===
	1	2	3	4	OT	Total
Warhawks	7	7	0	14	0	28
Tigers	7	14	7	0	3	31

=== Baylor ===
	1	2	3	4	Total
Bears	0	24	10	13	47
Warhawks	14	7	7	14	42

=== @ Tulane ===
	1	2	3	4	Total
Warhawks	21	14	21	7	63
Green Wave	0	3	0	7	10

=== @ Middle Tennessee ===
	1	2	3	4	Total
Warhawks	7	10	14	0	31
Blue Raiders	3	0	7	7	17

=== Florida Atlantic ===
	1	2	3	4	Total
Owls	0	7	0	7	14
Warhawks	7	14	7	7	35

=== @ WKU ===
	1	2	3	4	OT	Total
Warhawks	0	21	0	14	8	43
Hilltoppers	7	21	0	7	7	42

=== South Alabama ===
	1	2	3	4	Total
Jaguars	7	7	7	3	24
Warhawks	0	21	7	10	38

=== Louisiana–Lafayette ===
	1	2	3	4	Total
Ragin' Cajuns	7	14	7	12	40
Warhawks	10	7	0	7	24

=== @ Arkansas State ===
	1	2	3	4	Total
Warhawks	7	3	7	6	23
Red Wolves	14	3	21	7	45

=== North Texas ===
	1	2	3	4	Total
Mean Green	0	3	7	6	16
Warhawks	7	7	7	21	42

=== @ FIU ===
	1	2	3	4	OT	Total
Warhawks	7	3	7	0	6	23
Panthers	0	7	3	7	0	17

=== Ohio–Independence Bowl ===
	1	2	3	4	Total
Bobcats	14	10	14	7	45
Warhawks	0	7	7	0	14

== Rankings ==
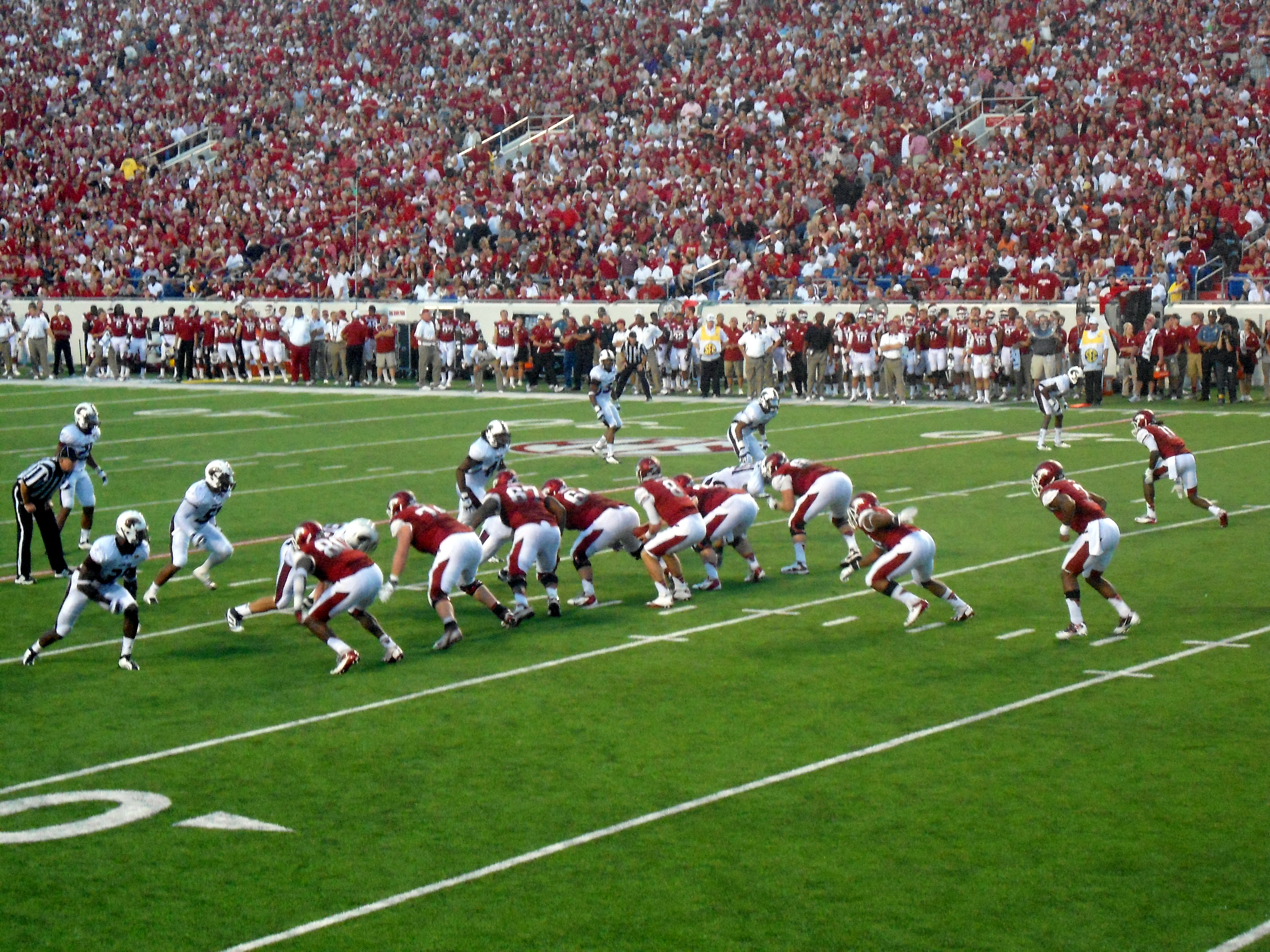
ULM shocks #8 Arkansas in War Memorial Stadium, 34-31 OT

Ranking movements Legend: ██ Increase in ranking ██ Decrease in ranking — = Not ranked RV = Received votes
	Week															
Poll	Pre	1	2	3	4	5	6	7	8	9	10	11	12	13	14	Final
AP	—	RV	RV	—	—	—	—	—	—	RV	—	—	—	—	—	—
Coaches	—	RV	RV	RV	RV	RV	RV	RV	RV	RV	RV	—	—	—	—	—
Harris	Not released						RV	RV	RV	RV	—	—	RV	RV	—	Not released
BCS	Not released							—	—	—	—	—	—	—	—	Not released
