= 2011 North Texas Mean Green football team =

American college football season

2011 North Texas Mean Green football
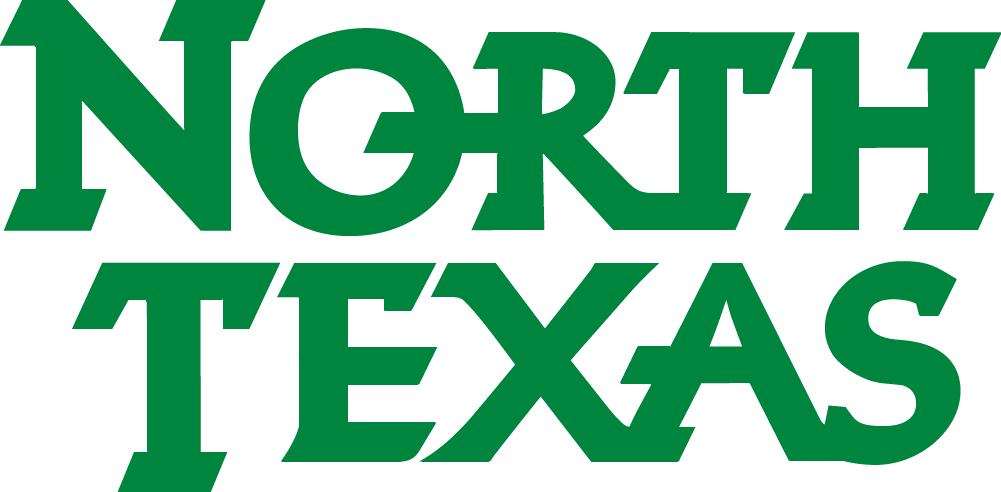
- Conference: Sun Belt Conference
- Record: 5–7 (4–4 Sun Belt)
- Head coach: Dan McCarney (1st season)
- Offensive coordinator: Mike Canales (2nd season)
- Offensive scheme: Pro-style
- Defensive coordinator: Clint Bowen (1st season)
- Base defense: 3–3–5
- Home stadium: Apogee Stadium

2011 Sun Belt Conference football standings
	Conf.			Overall
Team	W		L	W		L
Arkansas State $	8	–	0	10	–	3
Western Kentucky	7	–	1	7	–	5
FIU	5	–	3	8	–	5
North Texas	4	–	4	5	–	7
Louisiana–Monroe	3	–	5	4	–	8
Troy	2	–	6	3	–	9
Louisiana–Lafayette *	1	–	2	1	–	4
Middle Tennessee	1	–	7	2	–	10
Florida Atlantic	0	–	8	1	–	11
$ – Conference champion; * – Louisiana–Lafayette vacated 8 wins including 5 in conference due to NCAA violations.

The 2011 North Texas Mean Green football team represented the University of North Texas as a member of the Sun Belt Conference during the 2011 NCAA Division I FBS football season. Led by first-year head coach Dan McCarney, the Mean Green compiled an overall record of 5–7 with a mark 4–4 in conference play, placing fourth in Sun Belt. The team played home games at the newly-Apogee Stadium in Denton, Texas.

== Schedule ==
Date	Time	Opponent	Site	TV	Result	Attendance
September 1	6:00 pm	at FIU	FIU Stadium; Miami, FL	ESPN3	L 16–41	17,568
September 10	6:00 pm	Houston*	Apogee Stadium; Denton, TX	ESPN3	L 23–48	28,075
September 17	6:30 pm	at No. 2 Alabama*	Bryant–Denny Stadium; Tuscaloosa, AL	FSN	L 0–41	101,821
September 24	6:00 pm	Indiana*	Apogee Stadium; Denton, TX	ESPN3	W 24–21	21,181
October 1	6:00 pm	at Tulsa*	Skelly Field at H. A. Chapman Stadium; Tulsa, OK		L 24–41	21,240
October 8	6:30 pm	Florida Atlantic	Apogee Stadium; Denton, TX	Sun Belt Network	W 31–17	13,142
October 15	4:00 pm	at Louisiana–Lafayette	Cajun Field; Lafayette, LA	ESPN3	L 10–30	32,823
October 22	4:00 pm	Louisiana–Monroe^{†}	Apogee Stadium; Denton, TX		W 38–21	17,815
October 29	6:00 pm	at Arkansas State	ASU Stadium; Jonesboro, AR		L 14–37	19,761
November 12	12:00 pm	at Troy	Veterans Memorial Stadium; Troy, AL	Sun Belt Network	W 38–33	17,103
November 19	3:00 pm	Western Kentucky	Apogee Stadium; Denton, TX	ESPN3	L 21–31	17,011
December 3	3:00 pm	Middle Tennessee	Apogee Stadium; Denton, TX		W 59–7	15,962
*Non-conference game; ^{†}Homecoming; Rankings from AP Poll released prior to the game; All times are in Central time
