= 2011 Louisiana–Monroe Warhawks football team =

American college football season

2011 Louisiana–Monroe Warhawks football
- Conference: Sun Belt Conference
- Record: 4–8 (3–5 Sun Belt)
- Head coach: Todd Berry (2nd season)
- Offensive coordinator: Steve Farmer (4th season)
- Offensive scheme: Spread
- Defensive coordinator: Troy Reffett (3rd season)
- Base defense: 3–3–5
- Home stadium: Malone Stadium

2011 Sun Belt Conference football standings
	Conf.			Overall
Team	W		L	W		L
Arkansas State $	8	–	0	10	–	3
Western Kentucky	7	–	1	7	–	5
FIU	5	–	3	8	–	5
North Texas	4	–	4	5	–	7
Louisiana–Monroe	3	–	5	4	–	8
Troy	2	–	6	3	–	9
Louisiana–Lafayette *	1	–	2	1	–	4
Middle Tennessee	1	–	7	2	–	10
Florida Atlantic	0	–	8	1	–	11
$ – Conference champion; * – Louisiana–Lafayette vacated 8 wins including 5 in conference due to NCAA violations.

The 2011 Louisiana–Monroe Warhawks team represented the University of Louisiana at Monroe in the 2011 NCAA Division I FBS football season. The Warhawks were led by second-year head coach Todd Berry and played their home games at Malone Stadium. They are members of the Sun Belt Conference. They finished the season 4–8, 3–5 in Sun Belt play to finish in sixth place. The team was defensively strong, finishing 8th in FBS at rush defense and 22nd in total defense, and placing two defensive starters on the Sun Belt All-Conference First Team.

== Schedule ==
Date	Time	Opponent	Site	TV	Result	Attendance
September 3	2:30 pm	at No. 5 Florida State*	Doak Campbell Stadium; Tallahassee, FL	ESPNU	L 0–34	72,226
September 10	6:00 pm	Grambling State*	Malone Stadium; Monroe, LA		W 35–7	26,532
September 17	1:00 pm	at No. 23 TCU*	Amon G. Carter Stadium; Fort Worth, TX	The Mtn.	L 17–38	32,719
September 24	11:00 am	at Iowa*	Kinnick Stadium; Iowa City, IA	BTN	L 17–45	70,585
October 8	6:00 pm	Arkansas State	Malone Stadium; Monroe, LA		L 19–24	15,027
October 15	6:00 pm	at Troy	Veterans Memorial Stadium; Troy, AL	ESPN3	W 38–10	19,818
October 22	6:00 pm	at North Texas	Apogee Stadium; Denton, TX		L 21–38	17,815
October 29	2:30 pm	Western Kentucky^{†}	Malone Stadium; Monroe, LA		L 28–31 ^{OT}	13,428
November 5	2:30 pm	at Louisiana–Lafayette	Cajun Field; Layfaette, LA (Battle on the Bayou)		L 35–36	28,176
November 12	2:30 pm	Middle Tennessee	Malone Stadium; Monroe, LA	ESPN3	W 42–14	11,987
November 19	3:00 pm	Florida International	Malone Stadium; Monroe, LA	ESPN3	L 17–28	10,587
December 3	5:00 pm	at Florida Atlantic	FAU Stadium; Boca Raton, FL		W 26–0	15,171
*Non-conference game; ^{†}Homecoming; Rankings from Coaches' Poll released prior to the game; All times are in Central time; Source:
