= 2011 Troy Trojans football team =

American college football season

2011 Troy Trojans football
- Conference: Sun Belt Conference
- Record: 3–9 (2–6 Sun Belt)
- Head coach: Larry Blakeney (21st season)
- Offensive coordinator: Kenny Edenfield (2nd season)
- Offensive scheme: Spread
- Defensive coordinator: Jeremy Rowell (6th season)
- Base defense: 4–2–5
- Home stadium: Veterans Memorial Stadium

2011 Sun Belt Conference football standings
| | Conf. | | | Overall |
| Team | W | | L | W | | L |
|---|---|---|---|---|---|---|
| Arkansas State $ | 8 | – | 0 | 10 | – | 3 |
| Western Kentucky | 7 | – | 1 | 7 | – | 5 |
| FIU | 5 | – | 3 | 8 | – | 5 |
| North Texas | 4 | – | 4 | 5 | – | 7 |
| Louisiana–Monroe | 3 | – | 5 | 4 | – | 8 |
| Troy | 2 | – | 6 | 3 | – | 9 |
| Louisiana–Lafayette * | 1 | – | 2 | 1 | – | 4 |
| Middle Tennessee | 1 | – | 7 | 2 | – | 10 |
| Florida Atlantic | 0 | – | 8 | 1 | – | 11 |
$ – Conference champion; * – Louisiana–Lafayette vacated 8 wins including 5 in conference due to NCAA violations.

The 2011 Troy Trojans football team represented Troy University in the 2011 NCAA Division I FBS football season. The Trojans were led by 21st-year head coach Larry Blakeney and played their home games at Veterans Memorial Stadium. They are members of the Sun Belt Conference. They finished the season 3–9, 2–6 in Sun Belt play to finish in seventh place.

== Schedule ==
| Date | Time | Opponent | Site | TV | Result | Attendance |
|---|---|---|---|---|---|---|
| September 3 | 2:30 pm | at Clemson* | Memorial Stadium; Clemson, SC | ESPN3 | L 19–43 | 73,458 |
| September 17 | 6:30 pm | at No. 14 Arkansas* | Donald W. Reynolds Razorback Stadium; Fayetteville, AR | CSS | L 28–38 | 69,861 |
| September 24 | 3:30 pm | Middle Tennessee | Veterans Memorial Stadium; Troy, AL (Battle for the Palladium) | ESPN3 | W 38–35 | 20,185 |
| October 1 | 6:00 pm | UAB* | Veterans Memorial Stadium; Troy, AL | SportSouth | W 24–23 | 18,044 |
| October 8 | 7:00 pm | at Louisiana | Cajun Field; Lafayette, LA | ESPN3 | L 17–31 | 29,775 |
| October 15 | 6:00 pm | Louisiana–Monroe | Veterans Memorial Stadium; Troy, AL | ESPN3 | L 10–38 | 19,818 |
| October 25 | 7:00 pm | at FIU | FIU Stadium; Miami, FL | ESPN2 | L 20–23 ^{OT} | 15,852 |
| November 5 | 2:30 pm | at Navy* | Navy–Marine Corps Memorial Stadium; Annapolis, MD | CBSSN | L 14–42 | 33,359 |
| November 12 | 12:00 pm | North Texas^{†} | Veterans Memorial Stadium; Troy, AL | SBCN | L 33–38 | 17,103 |
| November 19 | 2:30 pm | Florida Atlantic | Veterans Memorial Stadium; Troy, AL | | W 34–7 | 14,342 |
| November 26 | 12:00 pm | at Western Kentucky | Houchens Industries–L. T. Smith Stadium; Bowling Green, KY | | L 18–41 | 15,432 |
| December 3 | 2:00 pm | at Arkansas State | ASU Stadium; Jonesboro, AR | | L 14–45 | 14,156 |
*Non-conference game; ^{†}Homecoming; Rankings from AP Poll released prior to the game; All times are in Central time
