= 2011 Florida Atlantic Owls football team =

American college football season

2011 Florida Atlantic Owls football
- Conference: Sun Belt Conference
- Record: 1–11 (0–8 Sun Belt)
- Head coach: Howard Schnellenberger (11th season)
- Offensive coordinator: Daryl Jackson (3rd season)
- Offensive scheme: Pro-style
- Defensive coordinator: Kurt Van Valkenburgh (2nd season)
- Base defense: 4–3
- Home stadium: FAU Stadium

2011 Sun Belt Conference football standings
	Conf.			Overall
Team	W		L	W		L
Arkansas State $	8	–	0	10	–	3
Western Kentucky	7	–	1	7	–	5
FIU	5	–	3	8	–	5
North Texas	4	–	4	5	–	7
Louisiana–Monroe	3	–	5	4	–	8
Troy	2	–	6	3	–	9
Louisiana–Lafayette *	1	–	2	1	–	4
Middle Tennessee	1	–	7	2	–	10
Florida Atlantic	0	–	8	1	–	11
$ – Conference champion; * – Louisiana–Lafayette vacated 8 wins including 5 in conference due to NCAA violations.

The 2011 Florida Atlantic Owls football team represented Florida Atlantic University (FAU) as a member of the Sun Belt Conference during the 2011 NCAA Division I FBS football season. Led by Howard Schnellenberger in his 11th and final season as head coach, the Owls compiled an overall record of 1–11 with a mark of 0–8 in conference play, placing last out of nine teams in the Sun Belt. The team played home games at the newly-opened FAU Stadium in Boca Raton, Florida.

Before the season, Schnellenberger announced his retirement at the end of the year.

== Schedule ==
Date	Time	Opponent	Site	TV	Result	Attendance
September 3	7:00 p.m.	at No. 22 Florida*	Ben Hill Griffin Stadium; Gainesville, FL	ESPNU	L 3–41	88,708
September 10	12:00 p.m.	at No. 17 Michigan State*	Spartan Stadium; East Lansing, MI	ESPN2	L 0–44	70,249
September 24	6:00 p.m.	at Auburn*	Jordan–Hare Stadium; Auburn, AL	FS South	L 14–30	82,249
October 1	7:00 p.m.	at Louisiana–Lafayette	Cajun Field; Lafayette, LA		L 34–37	26,339
October 8	7:30 p.m.	at North Texas	Apogee Stadium; Denton, TX	Sun Belt Network	L 17–31	13,142
October 15	4:00 p.m.	Western Kentucky	FAU Stadium; Boca Raton, FL		L 0–20	29,103
October 22	8:00 p.m.	Middle Tennessee	FAU Stadium; Boca Raton, FL	Sun Belt Network	L 14–38	16,344
November 5	4:00 p.m.	Arkansas State^{†}	FAU Stadium; Boca Raton, FL		L 21–39	15,162
November 12	6:00 p.m.	at FIU	FIU Stadium; Miami, FL (Shula Bowl)		L 7–41	17,378
November 19	3:30 p.m.	at Troy	Veterans Memorial Stadium; Troy, AL		L 7–34	14,342
November 26	7:00 p.m.	UAB*	FAU Stadium; Boca Raton, FL	FSN	W 38–35	12,044
December 3	4:00 p.m.	Louisiana–Monroe	FAU Stadium; Boca Raton, FL		L 0–26	15,171
*Non-conference game; ^{†}Homecoming; Rankings from AP Poll released prior to the game; All times are in Eastern time

== Roster ==
2011 Florida Atlantic Owls football team roster
Players
Coaches
Offense

Pos.	#	Name	Class
WR	2	DeAndre Richardson	Jr
WR	4	Paul Moore	Jr
RB	5	Willie Floyd	Sr
QB	7	David Kooi	Jr
RB	8	Xavier Stinson	Jr
TE	9	Nexon Dorvilus	So
QB	10	Stephen Curtis	Fr
QB	14	Graham Wilbert	Jr
QB	16	Nick Bracewell	Fr
WR	19	William Dukes	Fr
WR	20	Billy Perez	Fr
RB	21	Tony Moore	Fr
RB	22	Damian Fortner	So
RB	25	Travis Jones	So
RB	28	Antonio Washington	Fr
RB	30	Frank Thompson	Fr
RB	30	Avionne Rolle	Sr
RB	32	Alfred Morris	Sr
RB	34	Javaris Giles	Fr
RB	35	Julius Cartwright	Fr
WR	39	DeAndre Robinson	Fr
FB	40	Chris Jackson	So

Defense

Pos.	#	Name	Class
DB	3	Keith Reaser	So
DB	6	Demetrius Williamson	Jr
LB	11	David Hinds	Jr
DB	13	Treon Howard	So
LB	15	Randell Johnson	So
DB	18	Tony Rodriguez	Jr
DB	20	D. J. Frye-Smith	Fr
DB	23	Winfred Strickland	So
DB	24	Brentley Harstad	Jr
CB	26	Curtis Cross	Sr
DB	27	Marcus Bartels	Sr
S	29	Cortez Ash	Fr
LB	31	Cory Henry	So
S	33	David Terrell	Sr
LB	36	Diondre Lewis	Fr
S	37	David Lozandier	Fr
LB	38	Blake Nehls	Fr
DB	39	Christen Milstead	Fr
LB	41	Tony Walding	Jr
S	42	Burak Kiranlar	So

Special teams

Pos.	#	Name	Class
P	17	Mickey Groody	Sr
K	38	Vinny Zaccario	Jr
LS	54	Tim Raber	Jr
LS	69	Morgan Barnett	Sr
K, P	92	Marcelo Bonani	Fr
LS	97	Nelson Arent	Fr

Head coach

- Howard Schnellenberger

Coordinators/assistant coaches

- Jared Allen (quarterbacks)
- Joe Corozza (tight ends / special teams)
- Johnny Frost (defensive ends)
- Dick Hopkins (defensive backs)
- Darryl Jackson (offensive coordinator / wide receivers)
- Richard Lage (defensive tackles)
- Dave Serna (running backs)
- Kurt Van Valkenburgh (assistant head coach / linebackers)
- Dale Williams (offensive line)
- Joe Fitzgerald (defensive graduate assistant)
- Michael Williams (offensive graduate assistant)
- Brian Remington (co-head strength and conditioning coach)

Legend

- (C) Team captain
- (S) Suspended
- (I) Ineligible
- Injured
- Redshirt

Roster
Last update: August 30, 2016
