= Stepfret Williams =

American football player (born 1973)

No. 80, 87
- Position: Wide receiver

Personal information
- Born: June 14, 1973 (age 53); Minden, Louisiana, U.S.
- Listed height: 6 ft 0 in (1.83 m)
- Listed weight: 170 lb (77 kg)

Career information
- High school: Minden (LA)
- College: La-Monroe
- NFL draft: 1996: 3rd round, 94th overall pick

Career history
- Dallas Cowboys (1996–1997); Cincinnati Bengals (1998); San Diego Chargers (2000)*; Birmingham Thunderbolts (2001)
- * Offseason or practice squad member only

Awards and highlights
- 3× All-Southland Conference (1993, 1994, 1995)

Career NFL statistics
- Receptions: 37
- Receiving yards: 421
- Receiving touchdowns: 2
- Stats at Pro Football Reference

Stepfret Williams III (born June 14, 1973) is an American former professional football player who was a wide receiver in the National Football League (NFL) for the Dallas Cowboys and Cincinnati Bengals. He played college football at the University of Louisiana at Monroe.

== Early life ==
Williams attended Minden High School, where his father was an assistant football coach. As a senior, he received All-state honors playing defensive back, while also being named an All-district selection at wide receiver, after registering 15 receptions for 350 yards.

He accepted a football scholarship from the University of Louisiana at Monroe. As a freshman he played behind Vincent Brisby, making 5 receptions for 86 yards and one touchdown in 5 games. His first career catch was good for a 43-yard touchdown in a 38-10 win over Nicholls State University. In the Division I-AA playoffs, he made 86 (second longest in school history) and 32-yard touchdown receptions against Alcorn State University.

As a sophomore, he became a starter and the team's leading wide receiver, recording 40 catches for 929 yards (18th in the nation), 10 receiving touchdowns (school record) and the first of three straight All-Southland Conference selections.

As a junior, the league moved from Division I-AA to Division I-A. In a higher level of competition, he produced 57 receptions for 1,106 yards (sixth in the nation and a school record), 10 touchdowns and six 100-yard receiving games (school record).

In his final year, he had 66 receptions (14th in the nation and a school record) for 1,056 yards (12th in the nation) and 12 touchdowns (school record). Against Mississippi State University, he made 12 receptions for 167 yards and scoring catches of 32, 39 and 7 yards in a 34-32 win. The following game against the University of Nevada, he had 10 receptions for 264 yards (school record) and 4 touchdowns (76, 8, 40 and 60 yards) for 24 points (school record). He also played in the Senior Bowl.

Williams is considered to be one of the greatest wide receivers in school history, after setting 15 records, including career marks with 3,177 receiving yards, 33 touchdowns, 16 one hundred yard receiving games, 11 receptions over 50 yards, the first UL Monroe player to gain over 1,000 yards twice in a career, the top two single-season yardage totals, two of the top four single-season reception totals and the top three single-season touchdown totals.

== Professional career ==
=== Dallas Cowboys ===
Williams was selected by the Dallas Cowboys in the third round (94th overall) of the 1996 NFL draft. As a rookie, he was on the inactive list for six weeks and both playoff games, registering only one reception for 36 yards. The next year, he earned the team's third down wide receiver role and registered 30 receptions (15 for first downs) for 308 yards and one touchdown.

In 1997, he missed most of training camp with a strained left hamstring. In the second game against the Arizona Cardinals, he led the team with career-highs of 5 receptions for 53 yards. He finished the year with 30 receptions, which was the best performance by the team's third receiver since Kelvin Martin had 32 receptions in 1992. Nineteen of his catches came on third down (12th best in the NFC) and 15 of his final 22 receptions came on third down and resulted in a first down.

In his third season, the Cowboys changed head coaches, and after the team was forced to re-sign Sherman Williams because of an injury to backup running back Chris Warren, the team released Williams because of performance issues and to remain under the salary cap.

=== Cincinnati Bengals ===
On September 2, 1998, Williams was claimed off waivers by the Cincinnati Bengals. He played in five games, registering six receptions for 81 yards and a touchdown. He was released before the start of the 1999 season.

=== San Diego Chargers ===
In 2000, he signed as a free agent with the San Diego Chargers, but was released on September 1.

=== Birmingham Thunderbolts ===
He was selected in the sixth round of the 2001 XFL draft by the Birmingham Thunderbolts. The XFL folded at the end of its debut season, after Williams was its leading receiver with 51 catches for 828 yards (league leader) and 2 touchdowns.
