= 2015 Louisiana–Monroe Warhawks football team =

American college football season

2015 Louisiana–Monroe Warhawks football
- Conference: Sun Belt Conference
- Record: 2–11 (1–7 Sun Belt)
- Head coach: Todd Berry (6th season; first 10 games); John Mumford (interim; final 3 games)
- Offensive coordinator: Steve Farmer (8th season)
- Offensive scheme: Air raid
- Co-defensive coordinators: Travis Niekamp (1st season); Adam Waugh (1st season)
- Base defense: 3–3–5
- Home stadium: Malone Stadium

2015 Sun Belt Conference football standings
	Conf.			Overall
Team	W		L	W		L
Arkansas State $	8	–	0	9	–	4
Appalachian State	7	–	1	11	–	2
Georgia Southern	6	–	2	9	–	4
Georgia State	5	–	3	6	–	7
South Alabama	3	–	5	5	–	7
Idaho	3	–	5	4	–	8
Louisiana–Lafayette	3	–	5	4	–	8
Troy	3	–	5	4	–	8
New Mexico State	3	–	5	3	–	9
Texas State	2	–	6	3	–	9
Louisiana–Monroe	1	–	7	2	–	11
$ – Conference champion

The 2015 Louisiana–Monroe Warhawks football team represented the University of Louisiana at Monroe in the 2015 NCAA Division I FBS football season. They began the season led by sixth-year head coach Todd Berry. Following a 59–21 loss to Arkansas State, Berry was fired after compiling a 28–43 record in six seasons as head coach. Defensive line coach John Mumford served as the interim head coach for the rest of the season. The Warhawks played their home games at Malone Stadium and competed in the Sun Belt Conference. They finished the season 2–11 overall and 1–7 in Sun Belt play to finish in last place,

== Schedule ==
Date	Time	Opponent	Site	TV	Result	Attendance
September 5	11:00 am	at No. 9 Georgia*	Sanford Stadium; Athens, GA	SECN	L 14–51	92,746
September 12	6:00 pm	Nicholls State*	Malone Stadium; Monroe, LA	ESPN3	W 47–0	20,397
September 26	3:00 pm	at No. 12 Alabama*	Bryant–Denny Stadium; Tuscaloosa, AL	SECN	L 0–34	101,323
October 3	6:00 pm	Georgia Southern^{†}	Malone Stadium; Monroe, LA	ESPN3	L 31–51	16,791
October 10	5:00 pm	at Tulsa*	Skelly Field at H. A. Chapman Stadium; Tulsa, OK	ESPN3	L 24–34	17,490
October 17	6:00 pm	Appalachian State	Malone Stadium; Monroe, LA	ESPN3	L 14–59	11,767
October 24	4:00 pm	at Idaho	Kibbie Dome; Moscow, ID	ESPN3	L 13–27	14,414
October 31	4:00 pm	at Louisiana–Lafayette	Cajun Field; Lafayette, LA (Battle on the Bayou)	ESPN3	L 24–30	17,410
November 7	2:30 pm	at Troy	Veterans Memorial Stadium; Troy, AL	ESPN3	L 14–51	18,041
November 14	2:00 pm	Arkansas State	Malone Stadium; Monroe, LA	ESPN3	L 21–59	9,063
November 19	8:30 pm	at Texas State	Bobcat Stadium; San Marcos, TX	ESPNU	L 3–16	14,003
November 28	10:00 pm	at Hawaii*	Aloha Stadium; Honolulu, HI	Oceanic PPV/Campus Insiders	L 26–28	21,284
December 5	2:00 pm	New Mexico State	Malone Stadium; Monroe, LA	ESPN3	W 42–35	7,774
*Non-conference game; ^{†}Homecoming; Rankings from Coaches' Poll released prior to the game; All times are in Central time

- Source: Schedule

== Game summaries ==
=== @ Georgia ===
Week One: Louisiana–Monroe Warhawks at Georgia Bulldogs – Game summary

Quarter	1	2	3	4	Total
Warhawks	0	7	7	0	14
#9 Bulldogs	14	21	9	7	51

at Sanford Stadium, Athens, GA

- Date: September 5
- Game time: 11:00 a.m. CDT
- Game weather: Weather: Partly sunny • Temperature: 80 • Wind: 3 mph
- Game attendance: 92,746
- Referee: Hubert Owens
- TV: SECN
- Final Stats

Game information

First quarter

- UGA – Nick Chubb 14-yard run (Marshall Morgan kick), 10:45. Bulldogs 7–0. Drive: 2 plays, 21 yards, 0:39.
- UGA – Jeb Blazevich 15-yard pass from Greyson Lambert (Marshall Morgan kick), 10:25. Bulldogs 14–0. Drive: 1 plays, 15 yards, 0:09.

Second quarter

- UGA – Keith Marshall 3-yard run (Marshall Morgan kick), 12:41. Bulldogs 21–0. Drive: 6 plays, 55 yards, 2:08.
- UGA – Nick Chubb 23-yard run (Marshall Morgan kick), 7:01. Bulldogs 28–0. Drive: 6 plays, 96 yards, 2:39.
- UGA – Sony Michel 31-yard pass from Brice Ramsey (Marshall Morgan kick), 2:06. Bulldogs 35–0. Drive: 6 plays, 45 yards, 3:27.
- ULM – Rashon Ceaser 22-yard pass from Garrett Smith (Craig Ford kick), 0:20. Bulldogs 35–7. Drive: 6 plays, 45 yards, 3:27.

Third quarter

- ULM – Rashon Ceaser 29-yard pass from Garrett Smith (Craig Ford kick), 11:02. Bulldogs 35–14. Drive: 8 plays, 75 yards, 1:46.
- UGA – Team safety, 8:06. Bulldogs 37–14.
- UGA – Malcolm Mitchell 28-yard pass from Greyson Lambert (Marshall Morgan kick), 6:40. Bulldogs 44–14. Drive: 3 plays, 58 yards, 1:20.

Fourth quarter

- UGA – Keith Marshall 2-yard run (Marshall Morgan kick), 10:58. Bulldogs 51–14. Drive: 13 plays, 93 yards, 5:52.

Leading Passers

- ULM – Garrett Smith 23/29 Comp/Att 206 Yds, 2 TD, 1 INT
- UGA – Greyson Lambert 8/12 Comp/Att 141 Yds, 2 TD

Leading Rushers

- ULM – Garrett Smith 13 Rushes 48 Yds. 2.0 Avg 24 Lng.
- UGA – Nick Chubb 16 Rushes 122 Yds. 7.5 Avg 27 Lng.

Leading Receivers

- ULM – Rashon Ceaser 13 Rec. 153 Yds. 11.8 Avg 29 Lng.
- UGA – Malcolm Mitchell 3 Rec. 52 Yds. 17.3 Avg 28 Lng.

Leading Tacklers

- ULM – Michael Johnson 3 Tack 5 Ast
- UGA – Quincy Mauger 5 Tack 3 Ast

In their first game of the season, the Warhawks lost, 51–14 to the Georgia Bulldogs. The game was delayed by 76 minutes due to lightning strikes during the third quarter. When a second lightning delay occurred with 9:54 remaining in the fourth quarter, the head coaches and athletic directors for both ULM and UGA mutually agreed to end the game at that point, citing safety concerns for both players and fans.

=== Nicholls State ===
Week Two: Nicholls State Colonels at Louisiana–Monroe Warhawks – Game summary

Quarter	1	2	3	4	Total
Colonels	0	0	0	0	0
Warhawks	10	30	0	7	47

at Malone Stadium, Monroe, LA

- Date: September 12
- Game time: 6:00 p.m. CDT
- Game weather: Weather: Clear • Temperature: 78 • Wind: NNW 14
- Game attendance: 20,397
- Referee: Jason Autrey
- TV: ESPN3
- Final Stats

Game information

First quarter

- ULM – Craig Ford 25-yard field goal, 11:07. Warhawks 3–0. Drive: 11 plays, 68 yards, 3:53.
- ULM – DeVontae McNeal 3-yard run (Craig Ford kick), 5:45. Warhawks 10–0. Drive: 11 plays, 51 yards, 3:59.

Second quarter

- ULM – Garrett Smith 10-yard run (Craig Ford kick), 12:08. Warhawks 17–0. Drive: 8 plays, 64 yards, 3:04.
- ULM – Ajalen Holley 13-yard pass from Garrett Smith (Craig Ford kick), 6:44. Warhawks 24–0. Drive: 7 plays, 52 yards, 1:19.
- ULM – Harley Scioneaux 17-yard pass from Garrett Smith (Craig Ford kick), 2:09. Warhawks 31–0. Drive: 3 plays, 71 yards, 0:58.
- ULM – TEAM safety, Caleb Tucker blocked punt through the end zone, 1:37. Warhawks 33–0.
- ULM – Ajalen Holley 47-yard pass from Garrett Smith (Craig Ford kick), 1:21. Warhawks 40–0. Drive: 1 plays, 47 yards, 0:11.

Third quarter

- No Scoring

Fourth quarter

- ULM – Ben Luckett 12-yard run (Spencer Perkins kick), 13:35. Warhawks 47–0. Drive: 9 plays, 51 yards, 3:11.

Leading Passers

- NSU – Tuskani Figaro 10/17 Comp/Att 101 Yds, 0 TD
- ULM – Garrett Smith 26/33 Comp/Att 370 Yds, 3 TD

Leading Rushers

- NSU – Michael Henry 15 Rushes 78 Yds. 5.1 Avg 15 Lng.
- ULM – Ben Luckett 12 Rushes 84 Yds. 7.0 Avg 15 Lng.

Leading Receivers

- NSU – Terry Lucas 5 Rec. 51 Yds. 10.2 Avg 31 Lng.
- ULM – Rashon Ceaser 10 Rec. 97 Yds. 9.7 Avg 34 Lng.

Leading Tacklers

- NSU – B.T. Sanders 8 Tack 4 Ast
- ULM – Michael Johnson 4 Tack 4 Ast

In their second game of the season, the Warhawks won, 47–0 over the Nicholls State Colonels.

=== @ Alabama ===
Week Four: Louisiana–Monroe Warhawks at Alabama Crimson Tide – Game summary

Quarter	1	2	3	4	Total
Warhawks	0	0	0	0	0
#12 Crimson Tide	7	7	10	10	34

at Bryant–Denny Stadium, Tuscaloosa, AL

- Date: September 26
- Game time: 3:00 p.m. CDT
- Game weather: Weather: Partly cloudy • Temperature: 81 deg F • Wind: ENE 6mph
- Game attendance: 101,323
- Referee: Matt Loeffler
- TV: SECN
- Final Stats

Game information

First quarter

- UA – Derrick Henry 3-yard run (Adam Griffith kick), 2:38. Crimson Tide 7–0. Drive: 11 plays, 55 yards, 3:47.

Second quarter

- UA – Calvin Ridley 15-yard pass from Jake Coker (Adam Griffith kick), 13:24. Crimson Tide 14–0. Drive: 1 plays, 15 yards, 0:09.

Third quarter

- UA – Adam Griffith 40-yard field goal, 8:44. Crimson Tide 17–0. Drive: 6 plays, 41 yards, 2:31.
- UA – Michael Nysewander 19-yard pass from Jake Coker (Adam Griffith kick), 6:06. Crimson Tide 24–0. Drive: 4 plays, 40 yards, 2:03.

Fourth quarter

- UA – Adam Griffith 35-yard field goal, 12:21. Crimson Tide 27–0. Drive: 7 plays, 35 yards, 2:19.
- UA – ArDarius Stewart 16-yard pass from Jake Coker (Adam Griffith kick), 10:05. Crimson Tide 34–0. Drive: 2 plays, 19 yards, 0:38.

Leading Passers

- ULM – Garrett Smith 17/37 Comp/Att 74 Yds, 0 TD, 2 INT
- UA – Jake Coker 17/31 Comp/Att 158 Yds, 3 TD, 1 INT

Leading Rushers

- ULM – Ben Luckett 7 Rushes 23 Yds. 1.9 Avg 7 Lng.
- UA – Kenyan Drake 10 Rushes 66 Yds. 6.5 Avg 15 Lng.

Leading Receivers

- ULM – Ajalen Holley 9 Rec. 38 Yds. 4.2 Avg 10 Lng.
- UA – Calvin Ridley 4 Rec. 38 Yds. 9.5 Avg 15 Lng.

Leading Tacklers

- ULM – Trey Caldwell 3 Tack 4 Ast
- UA – Minkah Fitzpatrick 5 Tack 2 Ast

In their third game of the season, the Warhawks lost, 34–0 to the Alabama Crimson Tide.

=== Georgia Southern ===
Week Five: Georgia Southern Eagles at Louisiana–Monroe Warhawks – Game summary

Quarter	1	2	3	4	Total
Eagles	10	21	0	20	51
Warhawks	0	10	7	14	31

at Malone Stadium, Monroe, LA

- Date: October 3
- Game time: 6:00 p.m. CDT
- Game weather: Weather: Clear skies • Temperature: 69 • Wind: NE 12G19
- Game attendance: 16,791
- Referee: Jeff Hilyer
- TV: ESPN3
- Final Stats

Game information

First quarter

- GSU – Ken Butler 26-yard blocked punt return (Alex Hanks kick), 12:16. Eagles 7–0.
- GSU – Alex Hanks 29-yard field goal, 5:22. Eagles 10–0. Drive: 11 plays, 31 yards, 5:37.

Second quarter

- GSU – Matt Breida 13-yard run (Alex Hanks kick), 12:58. Eagles 17–0. Drive: 9 plays, 64 yards, 3:36.
- ULM – Craig Ford 44-yard field goal, 7:07. Eagles 17–3. Drive: 12 plays, 38 yards, 5:51.
- GSU – L.A. Ramsby 1-yard run (Alex Hanks kick), 5:29. Eagles 24–3. Drive: 4 plays, 72 yards, 1:38.
- GSU – Wesley Fields 1-yard run (Alex Hanks kick), 1:31. Eagles 31–3. Drive: 8 plays, 69 yards, 3:07.
- ULM – Harley Scioneaux 2-yard pass from Garrett Smith (Craig Ford kick), 0:20. Eagles 31–10. Drive: 9 plays, 50 yards, 1:11.

Third quarter

- ULM – Jared Mapps 12-yard pass from Garrett Smith (Craig Ford kick), 6:57. Eagles 31–17. Drive: 3 plays, 80 yards, 0:54.

Fourth quarter

- ULM – Junior Williams 56-yard interception return (Craig Ford kick), 14:06. Eagles 31–24.
- GSU – L.A. Ramsby 41-yard run (Alex Hanks kick), 10:59. Eagles 38–24. Drive: 6 plays, 61 yards, 3:07.
- GSU – Matt Breida 6-yard run (Alex Hanks kick), 6:04. Eagles 45–24. Drive: 5 plays, 37 yards, 2:49.
- ULM – D'Marius Gillespie 10-yard pass from Garrett Smith (Craig Ford kick), 4:00. Eagles 45–31. Drive: 9 plays, 75 yards, 2:04.
- GSU – Wesley Fields 4-yard run (Alex Hanks kick failed), 0:31. Eagles 51–31. Drive: 8 plays, 44 yards, 3:29.

Leading Passers

- GSU – Kevin Ellison 3/9 Comp/Att 48 Yds, 0 TD, 1 INT
- ULM – Garrett Smith 21/36 Comp/Att 232 Yds, 3 TD, 3 INT

Leading Rushers

- GSU – Matt Breida 19 Rushes 149 Yds. 7.8 Avg 22 Lng.
- ULM – Kaylon Watson 10 Rushes 33 Yds. 3.2 Avg 8 Lng.

Leading Receivers

- GSU – Keigan Williams 1 Rec. 24 Yds. 24 Avg 24 Lng.
- ULM – Ajalen Holley 8 Rec. 166 Yds. 20.8 Avg 69 Lng.

Leading Tacklers

- GSU – Deshawntee Gallon 5 Tack 6 Ast
- ULM – Hunter Kissinger 7 Tack 5 Ast

In their fourth game of the season, the Warhawks lost, 51–31 to the Georgia Southern Eagles. The game was played just hours after ULM backup quarterback Daniel Fitzwater was found dead.

=== @ Tulsa ===
Week Six: Louisiana–Monroe Warhawks at Tulsa Golden Hurricane – Game summary

Quarter	1	2	3	4	Total
Warhawks	0	7	17	0	24
Golden Hurricane	10	10	0	14	34

at Skelly Field at H. A. Chapman Stadium, Tulsa, OK

- Date: October 10
- Game time: 5:00 p.m. CDT
- Game weather: Weather: Clear, sunny • Temperature: 76 • Wind: SW @ 6
- Game attendance: 17,490
- Referee: Kevin Stine
- TV: ESPN3
- Final Stats

Game information

First quarter

- TUL – Redford Jones 34-yard field goal, 8:01. Golden Hurricane 3–0. Drive: 13 plays, 47 yards, 4:49.
- TUL – Zack Langer 1-yard run (Redford Jones kick), 0:31. Golden Hurricane 10–0. Drive: 11 plays, 72 yards, 3:44.

Second quarter

- ULM – Garrett Smith 3-yard run (Craig Ford kick), 10:15. Golden Hurricane 10–7. Drive: 10 plays, 69 yards, 4:35.
- TUL – Redford Jones 28-yard field goal, 1:53. Golden Hurricane 13–7. Drive: 7 plays, 37 yards, 1:47.
- TUL – Justin Hobbs 36-yard pass from Dane Evans (Redford Jones kick), 0:26. Golden Hurricane 20–7. Drive: 5 plays, 66 yards, 0:33.

Third quarter

- ULM – Craig Ford 22-yard field goal, 11:56. Golden Hurricane 20–10. Drive: 9 plays, 70 yards, 2:58.
- ULM – Ajalen Holley 26-yard pass from Garrett Smith (Craig Ford kick), 6:16. Golden Hurricane 20–17. Drive: 7 plays, 43 yards, 1:39.
- ULM – Deontae McNeal 43-yard run (Craig Ford kick), 3:16. Warhawks 24–20. Drive: 6 plays, 77 yards, 1:48.

Fourth quarter

- TUL – D'Angelo Brewer 15-yard pass from Dane Evans (Redford Jones kick), 8:41. Golden Hurricane 27–24. Drive: 2 plays, 29 yards, 0:36.
- TUL – Zack Langer 1-yard run (Redford Jones kick), 6:16. Golden Hurricane 34–24. Drive: 8 plays, 33 yards, 2:17.

Leading Passers

- ULM – Garrett Smith 25/48 Comp/Att 231 Yds, 1 TD, 1 INT
- TUL – Dane Evans 28/44 Comp/Att 341 Yds, 2 TD

Leading Rushers

- ULM – Kaylon Watson 12 Rushes 75 Yds. 6.1 Avg 37 Lng.
- TUL – D'Angelo Brewer 16 Rushes 95 Yds. 5.7 Avg 17 Lng.

Leading Receivers

- ULM – Ajalen Holley 11 Rec. 113 Yds. 10.3 Avg 26 Lng.
- TUL – Josh Atkinson 9 Rec. 110 Yds. 12.2 Avg 28 Lng.

Leading Tacklers

- ULM – Hunter Kissinger 5 Tack 8 Ast
- TUL – Michael Mudoh 7 Tack 4 Ast

In their fifth game of the season, the Warhawks lost, 34–24 to the Tulsa Golden Hurricane.

=== Appalachian State ===
Week Seven: Appalachian State Mountaineers at Louisiana–Monroe Warhawks – Game summary

Quarter	1	2	3	4	Total
Mountaineers	10	14	21	14	59
Warhawks	7	7	0	0	14

at Malone Stadium, Monroe, LA

- Date: October 17
- Game time: 6:00 p.m. CDT
- Game weather: Weather: Clear, Humidity 20% • Temperature: 71 • Wind: NE 12
- Game attendance: 11,767
- Referee: Charles Lewis
- TV: ESPN3
- Final Stats

Game information

First quarter

- ULM – Kaylon Watson 35-yard pass from Garrett Smith (Craig Ford kick), 11:11. Warhawks 7–0. Drive: 10 plays, 75 yards, 3:49.
- ASU – Marcus Cox 2-yard run (Zach Matics kick), 6:04. Tied 7–7. Drive: 1 plays, 2 yards, 0:05.
- ASU – Zach Matics 38-yard field goal, 1:14. Mountaineers 10–7. Drive: 7 plays, 70 yards, 2:50.

Second quarter

- ULM – Marcus Green 31-yard pass from Garrett Smith (Craig Ford kick), 13:26. Warhawks 14–10. Drive: 7 plays, 75 yards, 2:48.
- ASU – Malachi Jones 43-yard pass from Taylor Lamb (Zach Matics kick), 11:04. Mountaineers 17–14. Drive: 6 plays, 78 yards, 2:22.
- ASU – Taylor Lamb 13-yard run (Zach Matics kick), 3:02. Mountaineers 24–14. Drive: 6 plays, 95 yards, 2:51.

Third quarter

- ASU – Bobo Beathard 58-yard pass from Taylor Lamb (Zach Matics kick), 13:30. Mountaineers 31–14. Drive: 4 plays, 79 yards, 1:30.
- ASU – Marcus Cox 4-yard run (Zach Matics kick), 8:39. Mountaineers 38–14. Drive: 8 plays, 63 yards, 3:21.
- ASU – Simms McElfresh 37-yard pass from Taylor Lamb (Zach Matics kick), 4:30. Mountaineers 45–14. Drive: 4 plays, 62 yards, 1:43.

Fourth quarter

- ASU – Terrence Upshaw 8-yard run (Zach Matics kick), 13:17. Mountaineers 52–14. Drive: 11 plays, 77 yards, 5:04.
- ASU – Ricky Fergerson 46-yard run (Zach Matics kick), 0:35. Mountaineers 59–14. Drive: 4 plays, 62 yards, 2:28.

Leading Passers

- ASU – Taylor Lamb 8/15 Comp/Att 261 Yds, 3 TD
- ULM – Garrett Smith 17/30 Comp/Att 192 Yds, 2 TD, 2 INT

Leading Rushers

- ASU – Marcus Cox 23 Rushes 122 Yds. 5.3 Avg 15 Lng.
- ULM – Ben Luckett 8 Rushes 66 Yds. 8.1 Avg 22 Lng.

Leading Receivers

- ASU – Bobo Beathard 2 Rec. 67 Yds. 33.5 Avg 58 Lng.
- ULM – Marcus Green 6 Rec. 68 Yds. 11.3 Avg 31 Lng.

Leading Tacklers

- ASU – Eric Boggs 7 Tack 4 Ast
- ULM – Hunter Kissinger 10 Tack 8 Ast

In their sixth game of the season, the Warhawks lost, 59–14 to the Appalachian State Mountaineers.

=== @ Idaho ===
Week Eight: Louisiana–Monroe Warhawks at Idaho Vandals – Game summary

Quarter	1	2	3	4	Total
Warhawks	7	3	3	0	13
Vandals	3	10	7	7	27

at Kibbie Dome, Moscow, ID

- Date: October 24
- Game time: 4:00 p.m. CDT
- Game weather: Weather: Indoors • Temperature: 68 • Wind: none
- Game attendance: 14,414
- Referee: Jason McArthur
- TV: ESPN3
- Final Stats

Game information

First quarter

- UI – Austin Rehkow 39-yard field goal, 8:56. Vandals 3–0. Drive: 13 plays, 56 yards, 6:04.
- ULM – Marcus Green 11-yard pass from Garrett Smith (Craig Ford kick), 0:42. Warhawks 7–3. Drive: 2 plays, 15 yards, 0:40.

Second quarter

- UI – Austin Rehkow 39-yard field goal, 12:09. Warhawks 7–6. Drive: 11 plays, 53 yards, 3:33.
- ULM – Craig Ford 44-yard field goal, 9:03. Warhawks 10–6. Drive: 4 plays, 12 yards, 1:59.
- UI – Trent Cowan 36-yard pass from Matt Linehan (Austin Rehkow kick), 0:07. Vandals 13–10. Drive: 13 plays, 96 yards, 2:33.

Third quarter

- ULM – Craig Ford 31-yard field goal, 9:03. Tied 13–13. Drive: 8 plays, 68 yards, 3:44.
- UI – Deon Watson 34-yard pass from Matt Linehan (Austin Rehkow kick), 6:27. Vandals 20–13. Drive: 9 plays, 79 yards, 2:29.

Fourth quarter

- UI – Deon Watson 23-yard pass from Matt Linehan (Austin Rehkow kick), 12:35. Vandals 27–13. Drive: 8 plays, 60 yards, 2:57.

Leading Passers

- ULM – Garrett Smith 19/37 Comp/Att 186 Yds, 1 TD
- UI – Matt Linehan 23/39 Comp/Att 315 Yds, 3 TD, 1 INT

Leading Rushers

- ULM – DeVontae McNeal 7 Rushes 43 Yds. 5.4 Avg 15 Lng.
- UI – Elijhaa Penny 36 Rushes 188 Yds. 5.1 Avg 15 Lng.

Leading Receivers

- ULM – Marcus Green 6 Rec. 62 Yds. 10.3 Avg 18 Lng.
- UI – Dezmon Epps 9 Rec. 98 Yds. 10.9 Avg 19 Lng.

Leading Tacklers

- ULM – Hunter Kissinger 12 Tack 5 Ast
- UI – Kaden Elliss 7 Tack 2 Ast

In their seventh game of the season, the Warhawks lost, 27–13 to the Idaho Vandals.

=== @ Louisiana–Lafayette ===
Week Nine: Louisiana–Monroe Warhawks at Louisiana–Lafayette Ragin' Cajuns – Game summary

Quarter	1	2	3	4	Total
Warhawks	14	10	0	0	24
Ragin' Cajuns	3	6	7	14	30

at Cajun Field, Lafayette, LA

- Date: October 31
- Game time: 4:00 p.m. CDT
- Game weather: Weather: Light Drizzle • Temperature: 68 • Wind: E @ 3MPH
- Game attendance: 17,410
- Referee: Jeff Hilyer
- TV: ESPN3
- Final Stats

Game information

First quarter

- ULL – Stevie Artigue 40-yard field goal, 13:27. Ragin' Cajuns 3–0. Drive: 4 plays, 3 yards, 1:17.
- ULM – Marcus Green 27-yard pass from Garrett Smith (Craig Ford kick), 8:03. Warhawks 7–3. Drive: 12 plays, 75 yards, 5:24.
- ULM – Ajalen Holley 29-yard pass from Garrett Smith (Craig Ford kick), 3:28. Warhawks 14–3. Drive: 4 plays, 29 yards, 2:10.

Second quarter

- ULL – Stevie Artigue 41-yard field goal, 14:14. Warhawks 14–6. Drive: 10 plays, 51 yards, 4:14.
- ULL – Stevie Artigue 33-yard field goal, 6:53. Warhawks 14–9. Drive: 9 plays, 34 yards, 5:35.
- ULM – Kaylon Watson 53-yard pass from Garrett Smith (Craig Ford kick), 6:14. Warhawks 21–9. Drive: 2 plays, 60 yards, 0:39.
- ULM – Craig Ford 29-yard field goal, 0:35. Warhawks 24–9. Drive: 14 plays, 63 yards, 4:31.

Third quarter

- ULL – Elijah McGuire 5-yard run (Stevie Artigue kick), 10:50. Warhawks 24–16. Drive: 9 plays, 65 yards, 4:10.

Fourth quarter

- ULL – Brooks Haack 13-yard run (2-point pass failed), 7:21. Warhawks 24–22. Drive: 7 plays, 31 yards, 2:30.
- ULL – Jamal Robinson 64-yard pass from Brooks Haack (2-point run good), 3:10. Ragin' Cajuns 30–24. Drive: 1 plays, 64 yards, 0:10.

Leading Passers

- ULM – Garrett Smith 16/35 Comp/Att 265 Yds, 3 TD
- ULL – Brooks Haack 6/13 Comp/Att 85 Yds, 1 TD

Leading Rushers

- ULM – Garrett Smith 19 Rushes 53 Yds. 1.7 Avg 7 Lng.
- ULL – Elijah McGuire 19 Rushes 63 Yds. 3.1 Avg 22 Lng.

Leading Receivers

- ULM – Marcus Green 8 Rec. 96 Yds. 12.0 Avg 27 Lng.
- ULL – Jamal Robinson 4 Rec. 92 Yds. 23.0 Avg 64 Lng.

Leading Tacklers

- ULM – Michael Johnson 5 Tack 3 Ast
- ULL – Dominique Tovell 10 Tack 2 Ast

In their eighth game of the season, the Warhawks lost, 30–24 to the Louisiana–Lafayette Ragin' Cajuns.

=== @ Troy ===
Week Ten: Louisiana–Monroe Warhawks at Troy Trojans – Game summary

Quarter	1	2	3	4	Total
Warhawks	14	0	0	0	14
Trojans	27	21	3	0	51

at Veterans Memorial Stadium, Troy, AL

- Date: November 7
- Game time: 2:30 p.m. CST
- Game weather: Weather: Cloudy • Temperature: 76 • Wind: 3 west
- Game attendance: 18,041
- Referee: Jason McArthur
- TV: ESPN3
- Final Stats

Game information

First quarter

- TU – Jed Solomon 20-yard field goal, 10:53. Trojans 3–0. Drive: 6 plays, 47 yards, 2:02.
- TU – Darrin Reddick 27-yard fumble recovery (Jed Solomon kick), 10:07. Trojans 10–0.
- TU – Jed Solomon 28-yard field goal, 7:05. Trojans 13–0. Drive: 6 plays, 18 yards, 2:42.
- ULM – Marcus Green 47-yard pass from Garrett Smith (Craig Ford kick), 4:38. Trojans 13–7. Drive: 6 plays, 75 yards, 2:27.
- TU – Bryan Holmes 43-yard pass from Brandon Silvers (Jed Solomon kick), 3:46. Trojans 20–7. Drive: 3 plays, 55 yards, 0:52.
- ULM – Ajalen Holley 30-yard pass from Garrett Smith (Craig Ford kick), 0:53. Trojans 20–14. Drive: 10 plays, 75 yards, 2:53.
- TU – Brandon Burks-yard yd pass from Brandon Silvers (Jed Solomon kick), 0:33. Trojans 27–14. Drive: 1 plays, 75 yards, 0:20.

Second quarter

- TU – Emanuel Thompson 9-yard pass from Brandon Silvers (Jed Solomon kick), 10:46. Trojans 34–14. Drive: 11 plays, 55 yards, 4:07.
- TU – LaMarcus Farmer 55-yard interception return (Jed Solomon kick), 6:22. Trojans 41–14.
- TU – Emanuel Thompson 3-yard pass from Brandon Silvers (Jed Solomon kick), 0:35. Trojans 48–14. Drive: 9 plays, 73 yards, 2:31.

Third quarter

- TU – Jed Solomon 33-yard field goal, 10:41. Trojans 51–14. Drive: 4 plays, 5 yards, 1:49.

Fourth quarter

- No Scoring

Leading Passers

- ULM – Garrett Smith 23/39 Comp/Att 257 Yds, 2 TD, 2 INT
- TU – Brandon Silvers 22/33 Comp/Att 326 Yds, 4 TD

Leading Rushers

- ULM – Ben Luckett 9 Rushes 40 Yds. 4.4 Avg 14 Lng.
- TU – Brandon Burks 19 Rushes 108 Yds. 5.6 Avg 37 Lng.

Leading Receivers

- ULM – Marcus Green 12 Rec. 149 Yds. 12.4 Avg 47 Lng.
- TU – Emanuel Thompson 6 Rec. 44 Yds. 7.3 Avg 15 Lng.

Leading Tacklers

- ULM – Hunter Kissinger 8 Tack 3 Ast
- TU – Cedarius Rookard 6 Tack 0 Ast

In their ninth game of the season, the Warhawks lost, 51–14 to the Troy Trojans.

=== Arkansas State ===
Week Eleven: Arkansas State Red Wolves at Louisiana–Monroe Warhawks – Game summary

Quarter	1	2	3	4	Total
Red Wolves	7	28	10	14	59
Warhawks	0	21	0	0	21

at Malone Stadium, Monroe, LA

- Date: November 14
- Game time: 2:00 p.m. CST
- Game weather: Weather: Partly Cloudy • Temperature: 68 • Wind: NE 10
- Game attendance: 9,063
- Referee: Kevin Stine
- TV: ESPN3
- Final Stats

Game information

First quarter

- ASU – Johnston White 1-yard run (J.D. Houston kick), 6:17. Red Wolves 7–0. Drive: 2 plays, 66 yards, 0:38.

Second quarter

- ASU – Tres Houston 27-yard pass from Fredi Knighten (J.D. Houston kick), 12:59. Red Wolves 14–0. Drive: 3 plays, 27 yards, 0:48.
- ULM – Marcus Green 39-yard pass from Earnest Carrington (Craig Ford kick), 11:16. Red Wolves 14–7. Drive: 6 plays, 65 yards, 1:43.
- ULM – Earnest Carrington 1-yard run (Craig Ford kick), 5:33. Tied 14–14. Drive: 5 plays, 54 yards, 2:01.
- ASU – Tres Houston 50-yard pass from Fredi Knighten (J.D. Houston kick), 4:04. Red Wolves 21–14. Drive: 5 plays, 77 yards, 1:29.
- ULM – Ben Luckett 85-yard run (Craig Ford kick), 3:44. Tied 21–21. Drive: 1 plays, 85 yards, 0:20.
- ASU – Chris Murray 53-yard pass from Fredi Knighten (J.D. Houston kick), 2:23. Red Wolves 28–21. Drive: 5 plays, 75 yards, 1:21.
- ASU – Tres Houston 17-yard pass from Fredi Knighten (J.D. Houston kick), 0:09. Red Wolves 35–21. Drive: 9 plays, 53 yards, 1:20.

Third quarter

- ASU – J.D. Houston 34-yard field goal, 6:20. Red Wolves 38–21. Drive: 7 plays, 27 yards, 2:11.
- ASU – Money Hunter 29-yard interception return (J.D. Houston kick), 5:17. Red Wolves 45–21.

Fourth quarter

- ASU – Dijon Paschal 35-yard pass from Fredi Knighten (J.D. Houston kick), 11:40. Red Wolves 52–21. Drive: 3 plays, 35 yards, 1:15.
- ASU – Fredi Knighten 2-yard run (J.D. Houston kick), 10:16. Red Wolves 59–21. Drive: 1 plays, 5 yards, 0:08.

Leading Passers

- ASU – Fredi Knighten 15/30 Comp/Att 300 Yds, 5 TD
- ULM – Earnest Carrington 5/19 Comp/Att 75 Yds, 1 TD, 3 INT

Leading Rushers

- ASU – Michael Gordon 13 Rushes 74 Yds. 5.7 Avg 14 Lng.
- ULM – Ben Luckett 18 Rushes 151 Yds. 8.3 Avg 85 Lng.

Leading Receivers

- ASU – Warren Wand 4 Rec. 22 Yds. 5.5 Avg 9 Lng.
- ULM – Marcus Green 4 Rec. 56 Yds. 14.0 Avg 39 Lng.

Leading Tacklers

- ASU – Khari Lain 7 Tack 4 Ast
- ULM – Hunter Kissinger 8 Tack 5 Ast

In their tenth game of the season, the Warhawks lost, 59–21 to the Arkansas State Red Wolves. Head coach Todd Berry was fired following the game.

=== @ Texas State ===
Week Twelve: Louisiana–Monroe Warhawks at Texas State Bobcats – Game summary

Quarter	1	2	3	4	Total
Warhawks	3	0	0	0	3
Bobcats	3	7	0	6	16

at Bobcat Stadium, San Marcos, TX

- Date: November 19
- Game time: 8:30 p.m. CST
- Game weather: Weather: Clear • Temperature: 62 • Wind: ENE 5mph
- Game attendance: 14,003
- Referee: Jason Mcarthur
- TV: ESPNU
- Final Stats

Game information

First quarter

- TSU – Lumi Kaba 23-yard field goal, 8:22. Bobcats 3–0. Drive: 11 plays, 66 yards, 5:01.
- ULM – Craig Ford 28-yard field goal, 1:31. Tied 3–3. Drive: 10 plays, 63 yards, 3:53.

Second quarter

- TSU – Lawrence White 20-yard pass from Tyler Jones (Lumi Kaba kick), 2:42. Bobcats 10–3. Drive: 8 plays, 66 yards, 2:43.

Third quarter

- No Scoring

Fourth quarter

- TSU – Lawrence White 16-yard pass from Tyler Jones (James Sherman kick failed), 9:13. Bobcats 16–3. Drive: 2 plays, 6 yards, 0:31.

Leading Passers

- ULM – Earnest Carrington 16/33 Comp/Att 83 Yds, 0 TD, 1 INT
- TSU – Tyler Jones 14/25 Comp/Att 176 Yds, 2 TD

Leading Rushers

- ULM – Ben Luckett 12 Rushes 48 Yds. 3.5 Avg 14 Lng.
- TSU – Robert Lowe 22 Rushes 93 Yds. 3.9 Avg 21 Lng.

Leading Receivers

- ULM – Marcus Green 8 Rec. 39 Yds. 4.9 Avg 9 Lng.
- TSU – Lawrence White 5 Rec. 83 Yds. 16.6 Avg 23 Lng.

Leading Tacklers

- ULM – Hunter Kissinger 11 Tack 4 Ast
- TSU – Trey McGowan 4 Tack 4 Ast

In their eleventh game of the season, the Warhawks lost, 16–3 to the Texas State Bobcats.

=== @ Hawaii ===
Week Thirteen: Louisiana–Monroe Warhawks at Hawaii Rainbow Warriors – Game summary

Quarter	1	2	3	4	Total
Warhawks	3	7	10	6	26
Rainbow Warriors	7	14	7	0	28

at Aloha Stadium, Honolulu, HI

- Date: November 28
- Game time: 10:00 p.m. CST
- Game weather: Weather: Partly Cloudy • Temperature: 81 • Wind: NE 18MPH
- Game attendance: 21,284
- Referee: Kevin Mar
- TV: Oceanic PPV/Campus Insiders
- Final Stats

Game information

First quarter

- UH – Paul Harris 12-yard run (Aaron Novoa kick), 8:52. Rainbow Warriors 7–0. Drive: 6 plays, 50 yards, 1:56.
- ULM – Craig Ford 30-yard field goal, 5:13. Rainbow Warriors 7–3. Drive: 10 plays, 63 yards, 3:34.

Second quarter

- UH – Ikaika Woolsey 8-yard run (Aaron Novoa kick), 6:04. Rainbow Warriors 14–3. Drive: 8 plays, 74 yards, 3:33.
- UH – Harold Moleni 5-yard pass from Ikaika Woolsey (Aaron Novoa kick), 2:12. Rainbow Warriors 21–3. Drive: 6 plays, 56 yards, 2:25.
- ULM – Xavier Brown 3-yard pass from Earnest Carrington (Craig Ford kick), 0:24. Rainbow Warriors 21–10. Drive: 8 plays, 74 yards, 1:43.

Third quarter

- UH – Ikaika Woolsey 6-yard run (Aaron Novoa kick), 11:34. Rainbow Warriors 28–10. Drive: 9 plays, 78 yards, 3:20.
- ULM – Craig Ford 25-yard field goal, 6:56. Rainbow Warriors 28–13. Drive: 10 plays, 66 yards, 4:33.
- ULM – Ajalen Holley 13-yard pass from Earnest Carrington (Craig Ford kick), 3:42. Rainbow Warriors 28–20. Drive: 6 plays, 59 yards, 1:48.

Fourth quarter

- ULM – Lorenzo Jackson 0-yard fumble recovery (2-point pass failed), 3:03. Rainbow Warriors 28–26.

Leading Passers

- ULM – Earnest Carrington 27/44 Comp/Att 234 Yds, 2 TD
- UH – Ikaika Woolsey 8/16 Comp/Att 116 Yds, 1 TD

Leading Rushers

- ULM – Ben Luckett 8 Rushes 75 Yds. 9.4 Avg 26 Lng.
- UH – Paul Harris 27 Rushes 172 Yds. 6.1 Avg 27 Lng.

Leading Receivers

- ULM – Marcus Green 12 Rec. 103 Yds. 8.6 Avg 18 Lng.
- UH – Marcus Kemp 3 Rec. 44 Yds. 14.7 Avg 33 Lng.

Leading Tacklers

- ULM – Wesley Thompson 8 Tack 3 Ast
- UH – Marrell Jackson 6 Tack 3 Ast

In their twelfth game of the season, the Warhawks lost, 28–26 to the Hawaii Rainbow Warriors.

=== New Mexico State ===
Week Fourteen: New Mexico State Aggies at Louisiana–Monroe Warhawks – Game summary

Quarter	1	2	3	4	Total
Aggies	14	7	14	0	35
Warhawks	7	7	21	7	42

at Malone Stadium, Monroe, LA

- Date: December 5
- Game time: 2:00 p.m. CST
- Game weather: Weather: Clear • Temperature: 61 • Wind: E 5
- Game attendance: 7,774
- Referee: Kevin Stine
- TV: ESPN3
- Final Stats

Game information

First quarter

- NMSU – Larry Rose III 12-yard run (Parker Davidson kick), 12:27. Aggies 7–0. Drive: 2 plays, 23 yards, 0:22.
- NMSU – Jordan Bergstrom 76-yard pass from Andrew Allen (Parker Davidson kick), 4:08. Aggies 14–0. Drive: 3 plays, 83 yards, 0:55.
- ULM – Marcus Green 49-yard pass from Earnest Carrington (Craig Ford kick), 1:35. Aggies 14–7. Drive: 4 plays, 60 yards, 2:33.

Second quarter

- NMSU – Larry Rose III 1-yard run (Parker Davidson kick), 14:55. Aggies 21–7. Drive: 7 plays, 73 yards, 1:40.
- ULM – Deontae McNeal 74-yard pass from Earnest Carrington (Craig Ford kick), 14:34. Aggies 21–14. Drive: 1 plays, 74 yards, 0:21.

Third quarter

- NMSU – Stephen Meredith 9-yard fumble recovery (Parker Davidson kick), 12:58. Aggies 28–14.
- ULM – Marcus Green 11-yard pass from Brian Williams (Craig Ford kick), 9:34. Aggies 28–21. Drive: 3 plays, 11 yards, 0:16.
- ULM – Kaylon Watson 48-yard pass from Brian Williams (Craig Ford kick), 7:49. Tied 28–28. Drive: 1 plays, 48 yards, 0:12.
- ULM – Harley Scioneaux 32-yard pass from Brian Williams (Craig Ford kick), 6:21. Warhawks 35–28. Drive: 2 plays, 34 yards, 0:46.
- NMSU – Jordan Bergstrom 10-yard pass from Andrew Allen (Parker Davidson kick), 2:05. Tied 35–35. Drive: 13 plays, 75 yards, 4:16.

Fourth quarter

- ULM – Trey Caldwell 40-yard interception return (Craig Ford kick), 14:12. Warhawks 42–35.

Leading Passers

- NMSU – Andrew Allen 23/36 Comp/Att 308 Yds, 2 TD, 2 INT
- ULM – Earnest Carrington 5/15 Comp/Att 143 Yds, 2 TD, 2 INT

Leading Rushers

- NMSU – Larry Rose III 27 Rushes 74 Yds. 2.4 Avg 12 Lng.
- ULM – Kaylon Watson 9 Rushes 46 Yds. 5.1 Avg 23 Lng.

Leading Receivers

- NMSU – Teldrick Morgan 8 Rec. 101 Yds. 12.6 Avg 47 Lng.
- ULM – Ajalen Holley 4 Rec. 25 Yds. 6.3 Avg 13 Lng.

Leading Tacklers

- NMSU – Jacob Nwangwa 1 Tack 8 Ast
- ULM – Hunter Kissinger 7 Tack 8 Ast

In their thirteenth game of the season, the Warhawks won, 42–35 over the New Mexico State Aggies.

== Roster ==
2015 Louisiana–Monroe Warhawks football team roster
Players
Coaches
Offense

Pos.	#	Name	Class
WR	2	Rashon Ceaser	Sr
WR	3	Tyler Cain	Sr
WR	6	Brian Williams	So
QB	9	Earnest Carrington	GS
QB	10	Chandler Eiland	Fr
QB	12	Brayle Brown	GS
QB	13	Garrett Smith	RFr
QB	14	Will Collins	Fr
QB	17	Frank Maxwell IV	Fr
WR	17	RJ Turner	Fr
QB	18	Daniel Fitzwater	Jr
WR	21	Ajalen Holley	Jr
RB	22	Nathan Meadors Jr.	Jr
RB	25	Kaylon Watson	So
RB	28	DeVontae McNeal	GS
RB	30	Ben Luckett	RFr
WR	39	Markis McCray	Fr
OL	50	Jeff Savage	Jr
OL	56	Bobby Reynolds	Fr
OL	64	Brady Willcutt	RFr
OL	65	Austin Blair	Fr
OL	66	Ben Moye	Fr
OL	67	Jimmy Chung	Jr
OL	68	Colby Mitchell	GS
OL	70	Brian Thlang	RFr
OL	71	Chase Regian	So
OL	72	Jake Snyder	RFr
OL	73	Devin Jackson Jr.	Fr
OL	75	Frank Sutton Jr.	So
OL	77	Brandon Bridgers	So
OL	78	Rey Baltazar	Jr
OL	79	Keaton Baggs	RFr
WR	80	Brennen Bradley	RFr
WR	81	Marcus Green	RFr
TE	82	Stoney Hawkins	So
WR	83	D'Marius Gillespie	RFr
WR	84	De'Vonte Haggerty	So
WR	85	Jared Mapps	RJr
WR	86	Xavier Brown	Fr
WR	87	Tre' Perrier	Jr
TE	88	Harley Scioneaux	GS
TE	89	Alec Osborne	Jr
TE	97	Reagan Heddins	Fr
WR	99	Raquan Dobbs	Jr

Defense

Pos.	#	Name	Class
CB	1	Lenzy Pipkins	Jr
S	4	Tre' Hunter	Jr
LB	5	Cody Robinson	GS
S	7	Mitch Lane	Sr
CB	8	Junior Williams	Sr
LB	15	Braxton Moore	Jr
S	19	Alex Johnson	Jr
S	20	Justin Backus	Jr
S	23	Marquis McCullum	So
CB	24	Trey Caldwell	Sr
S	26	Roland Jenkins	So
CB	27	Grant Dotsy	So
CB	29	Marcus Hubbard	RFr
S	31	Aaron Townsend	RFr
S	32	Wesley Thompson	RFr
LB	33	Tevyn Cagins	Jr
LB	34	Michael Johnson	GS
LB	35	Jarred Dunn	So
CB	36	Brian Armstrong	RFr
CB	36	Trent Shaw	Fr
LB	37	David Griffith	RFr
S	38	Xavier Dias	Fr
CB	39	Nick Pratt	RFr
CB	40	Jarell Brown	So
S	42	Cortez Sisco Jr.	Fr
S	42	Brynden Vance	RFr
S	43	Korian Reynaud	Fr
CB	44	Nick Ingram	Fr
CB	44	Ferrando Joseph	So
DL	45	Lorenzo Jackson	Sr
LB	46	Chase Day	Fr
LB	47	Cody McGuire	RFr
LB	48	Hunter Kissinger	GS
DL	49	Ben Banogu	RFr
DL	51	Jacob Tyson	So
DL	52	Colton Moorehead	RJr
LB	53	Caleb Tucker	RSo
LB	55	Sterling Doss	RFr
DL	58	Donald Louis Jr.	Fr
DL	76	Gerrand Johnson	GS
DL	91	David Elias Jr.	So
DL	92	Jackson Randle	GS
DL	93	Shaquille Warren	RFr
DL	94	Nate Link	Fr
DL	95	Derion Ford	Fr
DL	96	Jaylen Veasley	Fr
DL	98	Sam Miller	Fr

Special teams

Pos.	#	Name	Class
K	16	Craig Ford	RFr
K	18	Spencer Perkins	So
P	41	Chris Qualls	Fr
LS	54	Todd Phillips	Sr
LS	74	Walker Easton	Fr

Head coach

- Todd Berry

Coordinators/assistant coaches

- Steve Farmer – Assistant Head Coach / Offensive Coordinator / Offensive Line
- Travis Niekamp – Co-Defensive Coordinator / Linebackers / Special Teams
- Adam Waugh – Co-Defensive Coordinator / Safeties
- Nate Brown – Assistant Coach / Cornerbacks
- Matt Clark – Assistant Coach / Tight Ends
- John Mumford – Assistant Coach / Defensive Line
- Jason Nichols – Assistant Coach / Passing Game Coord. / Wide Receivers
- Mario Price – Assistant Coach / Running Backs / Recruiting Coordinator
- Cody Wells – Assistant Coach / Quarterbacks
- Nick Cheesman – Graduate Assistant
- Michael Cross – Graduate Assistant
- Julian Griffin – Graduate Assistant
- Jake Olsen – Graduate Assistant
- Joe Girardi – Director of Strength and Conditioning

Legend

- (C) Team captain
- (S) Suspended
- (I) Ineligible
- Injured
- Redshirt

Roster
