= Pete Thomas (American football) =

American football player and coach (born 1991)

Current position
- Title: Co-offensive coordinator / quarterbacks coach
- Team: Cincinnati
- Conference: Big 12

Biographical details
- Born: October 11, 1991 (age 35); San Diego, California, U.S.
- Education: Colorado State (2010–2011); NC State (2012–2013); Louisiana–Monroe (2014)

Playing career
- 2016: Minnesota Havok*
- 2016: Los Angeles Kiss
- 2017: Tampa Bay Storm*
- Position: Quarterback

Coaching career (HC unless noted)
- 2017: Appalachian State (GA)
- 2018: Appalachian State (QC)
- 2019–2020: Louisville (QC)
- 2021–2022: Louisville (QB)
- 2023–2025: Cincinnati (QB)
- 2026–present: Cincinnati (Co-OC/QB)

Peter Alan Thomas (born October 11, 1991) is an American college football coach and former player who is currently co-offensive coordinator and quarterbacks coach for the Cincinnati Bearcats.

Thomas was a three-year starter at Valhalla High School in El Cajon, California, and earned various All-State honors. He began his college football career at Colorado State, where he was the team's primary starter from 2010 to 2011. In 2010, he was the only true freshman in the nation to start all of his team's games at quarterback. He then transferred to NC State, where he redshirted in 2012 and was a backup in 2013.

After the 2013 season, Thomas transferred to Louisiana–Monroe and was the team's starter in 2014. Thomas later started six games for the Los Angeles Kiss of the Arena Football League (AFL) in 2016. He was also a member of the Minnesota Havok of the Indoor Football League and the Tampa Bay Storm of the AFL.

Thomas also previously served under Cincinnati head coach Scott Satterfield at Appalachian State and Louisville.

== Early life ==
Thomas was born on October 11, 1991, in San Diego, California. He was a three-year starter, three-year captain, four-year letterman and two-time team MVP as a quarterback for the Valhalla High School Norsemen of El Cajon, California.

Thomas was on the varsity team his freshman year. Thomas also played outside linebacker as a freshman. He recorded over 1,900 passing yards, eight passing touchdowns, three rushing touchdowns and one receiving touchdown his sophomore season in 2007. He earned CalHiSports.com Second Team Sophomore All-State accolades. He was also named Second Team All-East County by EastCountySports.com.

Thomas played in 13 games his junior year in 2008, throwing for over 3,100 yards, 28 touchdowns and five interceptions as he helped the Norsemen advancing to the CIF San Diego Section final held at Qualcomm Stadium, where the team lost to eventual Division II state bowl champion Cathedral. Valhalla finished the year with an 11–2 win–loss record. Thomas earned First Team All-Grossmont South League, Grossmont South League Offensive Player of the Year, First Team San Diego Section All-CIF, and All-State honors. He was also named both First Team All-East County and the East County Co-Offensive Player of the Year by EastCountySports.com.

Thomas appeared in 11 games as a senior in 2009, passing for 2,392 yards and 24 touchdowns with six interceptions as the Norseman won their first Grossmont South League title in school history, and advanced to the first round of the CIF Division II state playoffs. Thomas earned First Team All-Grossmont South League, Grossmont South League Co-Offensive Player of the Year, First Team San Diego Section All-CIF, and All-State honors. He was named both First Team All-East County and the East County Co-Offensive Player of the Year by EastCountySports.com. He was also a finalist for the KUSI Silver Pigskin, which is awarded to the best high school football player in the San Diego Section. Thomas played in the Offense-Defense All-American Bowl on January 2, 2010. He was named the Offense-Defense CCN Scholar Athlete of the Year. He also received two points in the 2010 Best of the West voting but was not selected to the team.

Thomas also spent time as the team's kicker while at Valhalla and earned Grossmont South League Kicker of the Year accolades his junior season. Thomas set school records for single-season and career completions, completion percentage, passing yards, and passing touchdowns while also making the most field goals in school history. He started 36 games during his high school career, including the last three games of his freshman season.

Thomas also lettered two years in baseball, playing varsity as a freshman and sophomore before deciding to focus on football. He earned Honorable Mention All-Grossmont South League honors in baseball both years. He graduated a semester early. He won the San Diego Union-Tribune Scholar-Athlete award four times and was the Union-Tribune's Student-Athlete of the Year among football players in San Diego County his senior year.

In the class of 2010, Thomas was rated a four-star football recruit by Rivals.com, a three-star recruit by Scout.com, and a two-star recruit by ESPN.com. He was also rated the No. 16 pro-style quarterback in the country by Rivals.com, the No. 28 quarterback in the country by Scout.com, and the No. 91 quarterback in the country by ESPN.com. He was also rated both a three-star recruit and the No. 37 pro-style quarterback in the country on 247Sports.com's composite rating, which takes into account the ratings of all the other major recruiting services in the country. As late as October 2009, Tom Lemming had Thomas rated the No. 6 pro-style quarterback in the class of 2010.

Thomas began training with quarterbacks coach George Whitfield Jr. in the eighth grade.

== College career ==
Thomas committed to Arizona State in June 2009. He also had offers from Boston College, Northwestern, Colorado State, Maryland and Harvard. On December 21, 2009, he changed his commitment to Colorado State. The firing of Arizona State offensive coordinator Rich Olson on December 3, 2009, reportedly affected Thomas's decision. After Olson's firing, it was reported that Thomas was going to visit Colorado State. Thomas said that "after Coach Olson wasn't there anymore, I felt that I had to step back and reevaluate the situation. I called them just in the last two days saying I wanted to take a visit". After committing to Colorado State, Thomas said he "had been thinking of taking a visit to CSU ever since Arizona State's offensive coordinator got fired."

=== Colorado State University ===
Thomas played for the Colorado State Rams of Colorado State University from 2010 to 2011. He started attending Colorado State in the spring of 2010 due to graduating a semester early from high school.

Thomas started all twelve games as a freshman in 2010, setting a single-season school record with a .647 completion percentage. He was the only true freshman in the nation to start all of his team's games at quarterback. He was also the second freshman quarterback in school history to start the team's season opener (with the first being Bob Hainlen in 1945). Thomas completed 253 of 391 passes for 2,662 yards and 11 touchdowns with 13 interceptions. He broke Caleb Hanie's single-season freshman passing record and became the first freshman in school history to lead the team in passing yards. He completed 29 of 36 passes for 386 yards and three touchdowns in a 36–34 win against the Idaho Vandals on September 25, earning Mountain West Conference Offensive Player of the Week honors. Thomas led the Mountain West in pass completions and total plays in 2010.

Thomas started the first nine games of the 2011 season before suffering a knee injury that caused him to miss the rest of the year. He completed 161 of 261 passes for 1,607 yards and 7 touchdowns with 8 interceptions in 2011. He also rushed for three touchdowns and was a team captain. He had a 6–15 record as a starter at Colorado State.

In January 2012, it was reported that Thomas had been granted his release from Colorado State and that he would be transferring to another school. The firing of head coach Steve Fairchild in December 2011 reportedly played a role in his decision to transfer. Thomas said "I needed a new start, and I am looking for that opportunity. When I committed to CSU, I never thought of Fairchild or the staff being fired, but it's a business."

=== North Carolina State University ===
In January 2012, Thomas transferred to play for the NC State Wolfpack of North Carolina State University. He had to sit out the 2012 season due to transfer rules and redshirted. He was beat out for the starting job in 2013 by Brandon Mitchell and replaced him as the starter when Mitchell suffered an injury. Thomas played in nine games, starting six, for the Wolfpack in 2013. He completed 149 of 247 passes for 1,667 yards and four touchdowns with nine interceptions. He also scored two rushing touchdowns.

In February 2014, NC State announced that Thomas was going to transfer from the school after graduating with a bachelor's degree in May. Before the announcement, NC State head coach Dave Doeren had publicly said that transfer Jacoby Brissett would be the starter for the next two seasons. Thomas was a communication major at NC State.

=== University of Louisiana at Monroe ===
In April 2014, the University of Louisiana at Monroe announced that Thomas was transferring to play for the Louisiana–Monroe Warhawks in 2014. He started twelve games for the Warhawks in 2014, completing 301 of 501 passes for 3,181 yards and 14 touchdowns with six interceptions. He led the Sun Belt Conference in pass attempts and completions. Thomas also set single-season school records in passing completions and attempts while becoming the third quarterback in Warhawks history to throw for at least 3,000 yards in a season. He also rushed for three touchdowns. He was named to the Sun Belt Newcomer Team in 2014.

=== College statistics ===
Year	Team	Passing								Rushing			
Year	Team	Comp	Att	Pct	Yds	Y/A	TD	Int	Rtg	Att	Yds	Avg	TD
2010	Colorado State	253	391	64.7	2,662	6.8	11	13	124.5	77	−117	−1.5	0
2011	Colorado State	161	261	61.7	1,607	6.2	7	8	116.1	56	−36	−0.6	3
2013	NC State	149	247	60.3	1,667	6.7	4	9	115.1	72	163	2.3	2
2014	Louisiana–Monroe	301	501	60.1	3,181	6.3	14	6	120.2	110	6	0.1	3
Career		864	1,400	61.7	9,117	6.5	36	36	119.8	315	16	0.1	8

== Professional career ==
Thomas was rated the 29th best quarterback in the 2015 NFL draft by NFLDraftScout.com. He went undrafted and then participated in rookie mini-camp with the New York Giants and San Diego Chargers of the National Football League (NFL).

Pre-draft measurables
Height	Weight	40-yard dash	10-yard split	20-yard split	20-yard shuttle	Three-cone drill	Vertical jump	Broad jump
6 ft 5 in (1.96 m)	232 lb (105 kg)	5.06 s	1.69 s	2.94 s	4.4 s	7.25 s	30 in (0.76 m)	9 ft 2 in (2.79 m)
All values from Louisiana-Monroe Pro Day

Thomas signed with the Minnesota Havok of the Indoor Football League (IFL) in October 2015. The team folded before the start of their first season.

Thomas was assigned to Los Angeles Kiss of the Arena Football League (AFL) on March 12, 2016. He made his AFL debut at quarterback in relief of starter Nathan Stanley on April 9, 2016, against the Arizona Rattlers, completing one of three passes for ten yards. He made his first career AFL start in place of the injured Stanley on May 28, 2016, completing 16 of 26 passes for 223 yards and six touchdowns in a 54–42 win against the Portland Steel. Thomas played in 12 games, starting six, during the 2016 regular season and completed 167 of 295 passes for 2,086 yards, 43 touchdowns and eight interceptions. He also rushed for two touchdowns.

On October 14, 2016, Thomas was selected by the Tampa Bay Storm during the AFL dispersal draft. He was placed on reassignment by the Storm on February 14, 2017.

=== Professional statistics ===
Year	Team	Passing							Rushing		
Year	Team	Cmp	Att	Pct	Yds	TD	Int	Rtg	Att	Yds	TD
2016	Los Angeles	167	295	56.6	2,086	43	8	103.9	14	−6	2

Source: (Note: Thomas' ArenaFan profile says he completed 166 passes for 2,074 yards and 42 touchdowns in 2016, but official AFL sources have been used for this article and they say he completed 167 passes for 2,086 yards and 43 touchdowns.)

== Coaching career ==
Thomas spent a spring as the wide receivers coach for the Texas A&M–Kingsville Javelinas. He also spent time coaching at his alma mater Valhalla High School. In 2017, he joined the Appalachian State Mountaineers as an offensive graduate assistant under head coach Scott Satterfield. Thomas was promoted to offensive quality control coach in 2018 and also served as the interim quarterbacks coach for the 2018 New Orleans Bowl.

Thomas then followed Satterfield to the University of Louisville and served as the quality control specialist for the Louisville Cardinals from 2019 to 2020, and the quarterbacks coach from 2021 to 2022.

In December 2022, Thomas followed Satterfield to the University of Cincinnati, becoming the quarterbacks coach of the Cincinnati Bearcats. Following the conclusion of the 2025 season, Thomas was promoted to co-offensive coordinator along with offensive line coach Nic Cardwell, while maintaining his role as quarterbacks coach.

== Personal life ==
Thomas's cousin, Stephen Neal, played in the National Football League. Thomas's older brother, Chris, wrestled at the Air Force Academy and his mother, Avis, was on the crew team at the University of San Diego.

== See also ==
- Louisiana–Monroe Warhawks football statistical leaders
