= Robert Cobb (quarterback) =

American football player (1971–1999)

No. 12
- Position: Quarterback

Personal information
- Born: February 7, 1971; Bossier City, Louisiana, U.S.
- Died: June 6, 1999 (aged 28); Baton Rouge, Louisiana, U.S.
- Listed height: 6 ft 3 in (1.91 m)
- Listed weight: 220 lb (100 kg)

Career information
- High school: Westwood (Fort Pierce, Florida)
- College: Northeast Louisiana (1989–1993)
- NFL draft: 1994: undrafted

Career history
- Cleveland Browns (1994)*; Shreveport Pirates (1994–1995)
- * Offseason or practice squad member only

Awards and highlights
- Southland Offensive Player of the Year (1993); Third-team All-American (1993)

Robert Winford Cobb (February 7, 1971 – June 6, 1999) was an American professional football quarterback who played for the Shreveport Pirates of the Canadian Football League (CFL). He played college football for the Northeast Louisiana Indians.

== Early life ==
Robert Winford Cobb was born on February 7, 1971, in Bossier City, Louisiana. He played high school football at Fort Pierce Westwood High School in Fort Pierce, Florida.

== College career ==
In 1989, Cobb enrolled at Northeast Louisiana University to play college football for the Indians. He was put on scholarship in August 1989. He redshirted the 1989 season. Cobb was on the team's roster in 1990 but did not earn a letter. He was a three-year letterman from 1991 to 1993. He played in all 12 games as a senior in 1993, completing 211 of 369 passes (57.2%) for 3,256 yards, 33 touchdowns, and nine interceptions. Cobb's 33 touchdowns set a single-season school record. For his performance during the 1993 season, he earned Southland Conference Offensive Player of the Year, first-team All-Southland, and Football Gazette third-team All-American honors. He finished his college career with 249 completions on 431 attempts for 3,646 yards and 33 touchdowns.

== Professional career ==
After his strong senior season, Cobb became an NFL draft prospect. He was invited to the 1994 NFL Combine. After going undrafted in the 1994 NFL draft, he signed with the Cleveland Browns on April 26, 1994. On August 22, Cobb quit the Browns to sign with the Shreveport Pirates of the Canadian Football League (CFL), part of the CFL's expansion into the United States. He was signed to the Pirates' practice roster on August 24, 1994. He was later promoted to the active roster and played in ten games for Shreveport during the 1994 CFL season, completing 40 of 93 passes (43.0%) for 555 yards, three touchdowns, and eight interceptions. Cobb dressed in nine games for the Pirates in 1995, recording three completions on eight attempts for 52 yards while rushing three times for seven yards and two touchdowns. All of the CFL USA teams folded after the 1995 season, and Cobb began attending LSU Law.

== Personal life ==
Cobb became an attorney with Jones-Walker, a Baton Rouge, Louisiana firm. He died on June 6, 1999, at Our Lady of the Lake Regional Medical Center in Baton Rouge after suffering two heart attacks. He had no pre-existing medical condition.

== See also ==
- Louisiana–Monroe Warhawks football statistical leaders
