= 2011 Western Kentucky Hilltoppers football team =

American college football season

2011 Western Kentucky Hilltoppers football
- Conference: Sun Belt Conference
- Record: 7–5 (7–1 Sun Belt)
- Head coach: Willie Taggart (2nd season)
- Offensive coordinator: Zach Azzanni (1st season)
- Offensive scheme: West Coast
- Defensive coordinator: Lance Guidry (1st season)
- Base defense: 4–3
- Home stadium: Houchens Industries–L. T. Smith Stadium

2011 Sun Belt Conference football standings
	Conf.			Overall
Team	W		L	W		L
Arkansas State $	8	–	0	10	–	3
Western Kentucky	7	–	1	7	–	5
FIU	5	–	3	8	–	5
North Texas	4	–	4	5	–	7
Louisiana–Monroe	3	–	5	4	–	8
Troy	2	–	6	3	–	9
Louisiana–Lafayette *	1	–	2	1	–	4
Middle Tennessee	1	–	7	2	–	10
Florida Atlantic	0	–	8	1	–	11
$ – Conference champion; * – Louisiana–Lafayette vacated 8 wins including 5 in conference due to NCAA violations.

The 2011 Western Kentucky Hilltoppers football team represented Western Kentucky University (WKU) in the 2011 NCAA Division I FBS football season. The Hilltoppers were led by second-year head coach Willie Taggart and played their home games at Houchens Industries–L. T. Smith Stadium. They are members of the Sun Belt Conference. The Hilltoppers finished with a record of 7–5, 7–1 in Sun Belt play to finish in second place. The 7 wins and second place conference finish were the Hilltoppers best results since joining the FBS, until it was surpassed in 2015 with a perfect 8–0 conference record. Despite being bowl eligible, the Hilltoppers were not invited to a bowl.

== Schedule ==
Date	Time	Opponent	Site	TV	Result	Attendance
September 1	8:15 p.m.	vs. Kentucky*	LP Field; Nashville, TN	ESPNU	L 3–14	24,599
September 10	6:00 p.m.	Navy*	Houchens Industries–L. T. Smith Stadium; Bowling Green, KY	ESPN3	L 14–40	19,409
September 17	6:00 p.m.	Indiana State*	Houchens Industries–L. T. Smith Stadium; Bowling Green, KY	ESPN3	L 16–44	15,793
October 1	3:00 p.m.	Arkansas State	Houchens Industries–L. T. Smith Stadium; Bowling Green, KY	Sun Belt Network	L 22–26	10,813
October 6	6:30 p.m.	at Middle Tennessee	Johnny "Red" Floyd Stadium; Murfreesboro, TN (100 Miles of Hate)	ESPNU	W 36–33 ^{2OT}	23,307
October 15	3:00 p.m.	at Florida Atlantic	FAU Stadium; Boca Raton, FL		W 20–0	29,103
October 22	3:00 p.m.	Louisiana–Lafayette^{†}	Houchens Industries–L. T. Smith Stadium; Bowling Green, KY		W 42–23	15,122
October 29	2:30 p.m.	at Louisiana–Monroe	Malone Stadium; Monroe, LA		W 31–28 ^{OT}	13,428
November 5	3:00 p.m.	Florida International	Houchens Industries–L. T. Smith Stadium; Bowling Green, KY		W 10–9	15,293
November 12	6:00 p.m.	at No. 1 LSU*	Tiger Stadium; Baton Rouge, LA	ESPNU	L 9–42	92,917
November 19	3:00 p.m.	at North Texas	Apogee Stadium; Denton, TX		W 31–21	17,011
November 26	12:00 p.m.	Troy	Houchens Industries–L. T. Smith Stadium; Bowling Green, KY		W 41–18	15,432
*Non-conference game; ^{†}Homecoming; Rankings from Coaches' Poll released prior to the game; All times are in Central time
