= 2011 Middle Tennessee Blue Raiders football team =

American college football season

2011 Middle Tennessee Blue Raiders football
- Conference: Sun Belt Conference
- Record: 2–10 (1–7 Sun Belt)
- Head coach: Rick Stockstill (6th season)
- Offensive coordinator: Willie Simmons (1st season)
- Offensive scheme: Spread
- Defensive coordinator: Steve Ellis (1st season)
- Base defense: 4–3
- Home stadium: Johnny "Red" Floyd Stadium

2011 Sun Belt Conference football standings
	Conf.			Overall
Team	W		L	W		L
Arkansas State $	8	–	0	10	–	3
Western Kentucky	7	–	1	7	–	5
FIU	5	–	3	8	–	5
North Texas	4	–	4	5	–	7
Louisiana–Monroe	3	–	5	4	–	8
Troy	2	–	6	3	–	9
Louisiana–Lafayette *	1	–	2	1	–	4
Middle Tennessee	1	–	7	2	–	10
Florida Atlantic	0	–	8	1	–	11
$ – Conference champion; * – Louisiana–Lafayette vacated 8 wins including 5 in conference due to NCAA violations.

The 2011 Middle Tennessee Blue Raiders football team represented Middle Tennessee State University as a member of the Sun Belt Conference during the 2011 NCAA Division I FBS football season. Led by sixth-year head coach Rick Stockstill, the Blue Raiders compiled an overall record of 2–10 with a mark of 1–7 in conference play, placing eighth in the Sun Belt. The team played home games at Johnny "Red" Floyd Stadium in Murfreesboro, Tennessee.

== Coaching changes ==
On January 13, 2011, it was announced that both coordinators, Mike Schultz (Offensive) and Randall McCray (Defensive), would not return for the 2011 football season. After a very successful 2009 season, when the team went 10–3 and won the New Orleans Bowl, during the 2010 season the team fell in several statistical categories. The team's turnover margin went from being ranked 8th in the nation to being 120th in the nation. Middle Tennessee's total offense fell from 27th in the nation to 69th in the nation, while their total defense fell from 50th in the nation to 72nd in the nation. Both coordinators only served for one season at Middle Tennessee.

On January 24, 2011, Rick Stockstill announced that he promoted cornerbacks coach Steve Ellis to defensive coordinator and running backs coach Willie Simmons to offensive coordinator. Two days later, Coach Stockstill completed his staff by hiring Joe Cauthen to coach the linebackers and serve as the special team's coordinator, and Buster Faulkner to coach the quarterbacks and be the passing game coordinator.

During the season, on October 14, 2011, Willie Simmons abruptly resigned from his job as offensive coordinator following his arrest on aggravated assault charges. On October 17, Buster Faulkner was named MTSU's offensive coordinator.

== Schedule ==
Date	Time	Opponent	Site	TV	Result	Attendance
April 9	1:00 pm	Blue-White Spring Game	Johnny "Red" Floyd Stadium; Murfreesboro, TN		Blue 67–60	3,409
September 3	11:00 am	at Purdue*	Ross–Ade Stadium; West Lafayette, IN	BTN	L 24–27	42,110
September 10	6:00 pm	Georgia Tech*	Johnny "Red" Floyd Stadium; Murfreesboro, TN	ESPN3	L 21–49	30,502
September 24	3:30 pm	at Troy	Veterans Memorial Stadium; Troy, AL (Battle for the Palladium)	ESPN3	L 35–38	20,185
October 1	6:00 pm	Memphis*^{†}	Johnny "Red" Floyd Stadium; Murfreesboro, TN	ESPN3	W 38–31	20,098
October 6	6:30 pm	Western Kentucky	Johnny "Red" Floyd Stadium; Murfreesboro, TN (rivalry)	ESPNU	L 33–36 ^{2OT}	23,307
October 22	7:00 pm	at Florida Atlantic	FAU Stadium; Boca Raton, FL	Sun Belt Network	W 38–14	16,344
October 29	6:30 pm	Louisiana–Lafayette	Johnny "Red" Floyd Stadium; Murfreesboro, TN	Sun Belt Network	L 20–45	13,500
November 5	6:00 pm	at Tennessee*	Neyland Stadium; Knoxville, TN	FS South	L 0–24	88,211
November 12	2:30 pm	at Louisiana–Monroe	Malone Stadium; Monroe, LA	ESPN3	L 14–42	11,987
November 19	2:00 pm	Arkansas State	Johnny "Red" Floyd Stadium; Murfreesboro, TN	ESPN3	L 19–45	12,806
November 26	2:30 pm	FIU	Johnny "Red" Floyd Stadium; Murfreesboro, TN		L 18–31	10,227
December 3	3:00 pm	at North Texas	Apogee Stadium; Denton, TX		L 7–59	15,962
*Non-conference game; ^{†}Homecoming; All times are in Central time

== Roster ==
Quarterbacks: 6 Timmy Byerly (Fr.); 10 Logan Kilgore (r-So.); 11 Shaun White (Fr.); 12 Jeff Murphy (r-Jr.); 19 Andrew Banks (r-Sr.); Luke Hayes; Spencer Wise (r-So.); Running backs: 2 Benny Cunningham (Jr.); 21 Drayton Allen-Calhoun (r-So.); 23 D. D. Kyles (r-Sr.); 25 Reggie Whatley (r-Fr.); 29 William Pratcher (r-So.); 34 Marquise Branton (r-Sr.); Jeremiah Bryson (Fr.); Kennedy McGruder (r-Jr.); Kevin Mix (Jr.); Chase Pennycuff (Fr.); Tony Rowland; Evan Ward (Fr.); Wide receivers: 3 Tavarres Jefferson (Jr.); 4 Malcolm Beyah (Sr.); 9 Kyle Griswould (r-So.); 13 Tyler Mason (Sr.); 15 Sancho McDonald (Sr.); 16 Shane Blissard (r-Sr.); 17 Jamar Brown (Sr.); 37 Harold Turner Jr. (r-Jr.); 80 Jamal Gray (Jr.); 81 Christian Collis (Fr.); 82 Arthur Williams (r-So.); 84 Richard Drake (r-So.); 86 Anthony Amos (r-Jr.); 87 Vincent Van Horne (Sr.); 88 Marcus Thurmond (r-Jr.); Chris Lampkins (Fr.); Tight ends: 83 Jared Bamber (Sr.)	Offensive linemen: 50 Colin Boss (r-Sr.); 57 Judd Hunt (r-Fr.); 58 Jesse Grisham (r-So.); 60 Brandon McLeroy (Sr.); 61 Jadareius Hamlin (r-So.); 63 Quinton Groves (r-Sr.); 65 Alex Stuart (r-Jr.); 66 Micah James (Jr.); 70 Roberto Loya (Fr.); 73 Isaiah Anderson (r-Fr.); 74 Jason Rexroad (Fr.); 75 Darius Johnson (Fr.); 76 Jordon Johnson (r-So.); 77 Josh Walker (r-So.); 78 Mike Williams (r-Sr.); 79 Preston Bailey (r-Jr.); Lance Campbell (r-Fr.); Matt Sprouse (r-Jr.); Defensive linemen: 43 Gorby Loreus, DE (Sr.); 45 Alexandro Antoine, DE (Fr.); 46 Max Ugboaja, DE (r-Fr.); 51 SaCoby Carter, DT (r-Sr.); 55 Shubert Bastien, DE (Fr.); 72 Jesse Kirkland, DL (r-Jr.); 85 Omar McLendon, DE (Jr.); 89 Dearco Nolan, DE (r-So.); 90 Jimmy Staten, DE (r-So.); 91 J.D. Jones, DT (Fr.); 92 Patrick McNeil, DT (r-Fr.); 93 Marcus Robinson, DT (Fr.); 94 O'Shae Bridges, DE (Fr.); 95 Kevin Pope, DE (Jr.); 96 Kendall Dangerfield, DT (r-Jr.); 97 Jiajuan Fennell, DE (r-Fr.); 98 Morris Moore, DE (r-Fr.); 99 Jerrold Frazier, DT (Fr.)	Linebackers: 22 David Jones (r-So.); 28 Christian Henry (r-Fr.); 30 Stephen Roberts (r-So.); 32 Justin Jones (Jr.); 33 Roderic Blunt (r-So.); 35 Craig Allen (r-So.); 40 Leighton Gasque (r-Fr.); 48 Jonathan Brooks (r-Fr.); 56 Norman Washington (r-Sr.); 59 Darin Davis (Sr.); Defensive backs: 1 Eric Russell, S (Sr.); 5 Arness Ikner, CB (Sr.); 6 T.L. Edwards, CB (Sr.); 7 Khari Burke, CB (r-Fr.); 8 Sammy Seamster, S (r-So.); 18 Kenneth Gilstrap, CB (r-So.); 20 Kevin Byard, S (Fr.); 24 Derrick Crumpton, S (Sr.); 26 Marquise Dixon, CB (r-So.); 27 Chris Sharpe, CB (r-Fr.); 31 Denzell Guerra, S (r-Jr.); 36 Jajuan Harley, CB (Jr.); 39 James Roberson, S (Fr.); 42 Juno Prudhomm, S (Jr.); 47 Rodney O'Neal, CB (Fr.); 54 Zeke Anderson, DS (r.Sr); 67 Blaine Sidders, DS (Fr.); Bryan Armstrong, CB (r-Jr.); Brandon Grady, CB (r-So.); Robert Hogg, CB (r-Jr.); Greg Rein, DS (r-Fr.); Lee Woods, S (r-Jr.); Special teams: 36 Josh Davis, P (r-So.); 38 Alan Gendreau, PK (Sr.); 39 Zachary Lopez, P (r-Fr.); 49 Nathaniel Toulson, P (r-Sr.); Michael Kee, P (Fr.); Zack Martin, LS (r-Fr.); Tyler Presley, LS (r-Fr.)	Head coach: Rick Stockstill; Assistant coaches: Offensive coordinator/quarterbacks/passing game coordinator: Buster Faulkner; Defensive coordinator/Cornerbacks: Steve Ellis; Offensive line: Jimmy Ray Stephens; Safeties: David Bibee; Defensive Line: John Palermo; Wide receivers/recruiting coordinator: Justin Watts; Inside Receivers: Brent Brock; Linebackers/special teams coordinator: Joe Cauthen; LAST UPDATED 9/1/2011
