= 2011 Arkansas State Red Wolves football team =

American college football season

2011 Arkansas State Red Wolves football

Sun Belt champion

GoDaddy.com Bowl, L 20–38 vs. Northern Illinois
- Conference: Sun Belt Conference
- Record: 10–3 (8–0 Sun Belt)
- Head coach: Hugh Freeze (1st season; regular season); David Gunn (interim; bowl game)
- Offensive scheme: Spread
- Defensive coordinator: Dave Wommack (1st season)
- Base defense: 4–3
- Home stadium: ASU Stadium

2011 Sun Belt Conference football standings
	Conf.			Overall
Team	W		L	W		L
Arkansas State $	8	–	0	10	–	3
Western Kentucky	7	–	1	7	–	5
FIU	5	–	3	8	–	5
North Texas	4	–	4	5	–	7
Louisiana–Monroe	3	–	5	4	–	8
Troy	2	–	6	3	–	9
Louisiana–Lafayette *	1	–	2	1	–	4
Middle Tennessee	1	–	7	2	–	10
Florida Atlantic	0	–	8	1	–	11
$ – Conference champion; * – Louisiana–Lafayette vacated 8 wins including 5 in conference due to NCAA violations.

The 2011 Arkansas State Red Wolves football team represented Arkansas State University in the 2011 NCAA Division I FBS football season. The Red Wolves were led by first-year head coach Hugh Freeze and played their home games at ASU Stadium. They are members of the Sun Belt Conference. They finished the season 10–3, 8–0 in Sun Belt play to become conference champions. They were invited to the Godaddy.com Bowl where they were defeated by Northern Illinois 20–38.

Freeze resigned at the end of the regular season to take the head coaching job at Ole Miss. David Gunn was the Red Wolves interim head coach for the GoDaddy.com Bowl.

== Schedule ==
Date	Time	Opponent	Site	TV	Result	Attendance
September 3	2:30 p.m.	at Illinois*	Memorial Stadium; Champaign, IL	BTN	L 15–33	45,154
September 10	6:00 p.m.	Memphis*	ASU Stadium; Jonesboro, AR (Paint Bucket Bowl)	ESPN3	W 47–3	29,872
September 17	3:00 p.m.	at No. 12 Virginia Tech*	Lane Stadium; Blacksburg, VA	FSN	L 7–26	66,233
September 24	7:00 p.m.	Central Arkansas*	ASU Stadium; Jonesboro, AR	KATV	W 53–24	27,918
October 1	3:00 p.m.	at Western Kentucky	Houchens Industries–L. T. Smith Stadium; Bowling Green, KY	Sun Belt Network	W 26–22	10,813
October 8	6:00 p.m.	at Louisiana–Monroe	Malone Stadium; Monroe, LA		W 24–19	15,027
October 18	7:00 p.m.	FIU	ASU Stadium; Jonesboro, AR	ESPN2	W 34–16	15,573
October 29	6:00 p.m.	North Texas^{†}	ASU Stadium; Jonesboro, AR		W 37–14	19,761
November 5	3:00 p.m.	at Florida Atlantic	FAU Stadium; Boca Raton, FL		W 39–21	15,162
November 12	2:00 p.m.	Louisiana–Lafayette	ASU Stadium; Jonesboro, AR		W 30–21	20,261
November 19	2:00 p.m.	at Middle Tennessee	Johnny "Red" Floyd Stadium; Murfreesboro, TN	ESPN3	W 45–19	12,806
December 3	2:00 p.m.	Troy	ASU Stadium; Jonesboro, AR		W 45–14	14,156
January 8, 2012	7:00 p.m.	vs. Northern Illinois*	Ladd–Peebles Stadium; Mobile, AL (GoDaddy.com Bowl)	ESPN	L 20–38	38,734
*Non-conference game; ^{†}Homecoming; Rankings from Coaches' Poll released prior to the game; All times are in Central time

== Game summaries ==
=== at Illinois ===
	1	2	3	4	Total
Red Wolves	0	8	0	7	15
Fighting Illini	7	10	13	3	33

=== vs. Memphis ===
	1	2	3	4	Total
Tigers	0	3	0	0	3
Red Wolves	10	20	17	0	47

=== at Virginia Tech ===
	1	2	3	4	Total
Red Wolves	7	0	0	0	7
Hokies	16	7	3	0	26

=== vs. Central Arkansas ===
	1	2	3	4	Total
Bears	7	3	7	7	24
Red Wolves	10	9	17	17	53

=== at Western Kentucky ===
	1	2	3	4	Total
Red Wolves	0	10	0	16	26
Hilltoppers	7	0	7	8	22

=== at Louisiana–Monroe ===
	1	2	3	4	Total
Red Wolves	7	3	7	7	24
Warhawks	7	6	0	6	19

=== vs. FIU ===
	1	2	3	4	Total
Panthers	3	3	10	0	16
Red Wolves	0	6	7	21	34

=== vs. North Texas ===
	1	2	3	4	Total
Mean Green	0	0	7	7	14
Red Wolves	10	21	0	6	37

=== at Florida Atlantic ===
	1	2	3	4	Total
Red Wolves	15	7	3	14	39
Owls	0	14	7	0	21

=== vs. Louisiana–Lafayette ===
	1	2	3	4	Total
Ragin' Cajuns	0	7	17	0	24
Red Wolves	14	6	7	3	30

=== at Middle Tennessee ===
	1	2	3	4	Total
Red Wolves	15	10	14	6	45
Blue Raiders	2	17	0	0	19

=== vs. Troy ===
	1	2	3	4	Total
Trojans	0	14	0	0	14
Red Wolves	10	14	7	14	45

=== vs. Northern Illinois (GoDaddy.com Bowl) ===
	1	2	3	4	Total
Huskies	7	14	7	10	38
Red Wolves	13	0	0	7	20
