= Irving Spikes =

American football player (born 1970)

No. 40
- Position: Running back

Personal information
- Born: December 21, 1970 (age 55); Ocean Springs, Mississippi, U.S.

Career information
- High school: Ocean Springs (MS)
- College: Alabama; Louisiana–Monroe

Career history
- 1994–1997: Miami Dolphins
- Stats at Pro Football Reference

Irving Eugene Spikes (born December 21, 1970, in Ocean Springs, Mississippi) is an American former professional football player who was a running back for four seasons with the Miami Dolphins of the National Football League (NFL) from 1994 to 1997. He played college football for the Alabama Crimson Tide and Louisiana–Monroe Warhawks
