= Kinsmon Lancaster =

American gridiron football player (born 1986)

No. 7
- Position: Quarterback

Personal information
- Born: April 9, 1986 (age 40); Shreveport, Louisiana
- Listed height: 6 ft 0 in (1.83 m)
- Listed weight: 193 lb (88 kg)

Career information
- College: Louisiana-Monroe
- NFL draft: 2009: undrafted

Career history
- Toronto Argonauts (2009)*; Bossier-Shreveport Battle Wings (2010)
- * Offseason or practice squad member only

Career AFL statistics
- Touchdowns–INTs: 7–1
- Passing yards: 426
- QB rating: 72.73
- Stats at ArenaFan.com
- Stats at CFL.ca (archive)

Kinsmon Lancaster (born April 9, 1986) is an American former football quarterback. He played for the Bossier-Shreveport Battle Wings of the Arena Football League. He was signed by the Toronto Argonauts as a wide receiver in 2009. He played college football at Louisiana–Monroe.
