= Vincent Brisby =

American football player (born 1971)

No. 82
- Position: Wide receiver

Personal information
- Born: January 25, 1971 (age 55); Houston, Texas, U.S.
- Listed height: 6 ft 1 in (1.85 m)
- Listed weight: 188 lb (85 kg)

Career information
- High school: Washington-Marion (Lake Charles, Louisiana)
- College: Northeast Louisiana
- NFL draft: 1993: 2nd round, 56th overall pick

Career history
- New England Patriots (1993–1999); New York Jets (2000)

Awards and highlights
- PFWA All-Rookie Team (1993)

Career NFL statistics
- Receptions: 221
- Receiving yards: 3,202
- Receiving touchdowns: 14
- Stats at Pro Football Reference

Vincent Cole Brisby (born January 25, 1971) is an American former professional football player who was a wide receiver for the New England Patriots and the New York Jets in the National Football League (NFL). He was selected by the Patriots in the second round of the 1993 NFL draft, the team's fourth selection after quarterback Drew Bledsoe, DL Chris Slade, and OL Todd Rucci during their re-building phase that started with the hiring of Bill Parcells. Standing at 6'3" and 193 lb. from Northeast Louisiana University (now called University of Louisiana at Monroe), Brisby played eight NFL seasons from 1993 to 2000 for the Patriots and New York Jets. He was given the nickname Vincent "Ultimate" Brisby by ESPN analyst Chris Berman. Brisby's best game was arguably Week 5 in his second season. He compiled 6 catches for 117 yards and two touchdowns in the Patriots 17–16 comeback win over the Green Bay Packers.

Brisby was a member of the Patriots' 1996 AFC Championship squad. He injured his hamstring in pre-season that year and did not get into a game until Week 12, then missed two more games at which point his coach Bill Parcells was memorably quoted as saying that he himself had "recovered from open-heart surgery faster than he (Brisby) has (from the hamstring injury)...That's the truth. I'm not kidding you." After playing in only three regular season games and catching no passes at all in the regular season, divisional play-off, or AFC Championship, Brisby had two catches against the Green Bay Packers in Super Bowl XXXI.
