= Kolton Browning =

American football player (born 1990)

No. 15
- Position: Quarterback

Personal information
- Born: October 17, 1990 (age 36); Mesquite, Texas, U.S.
- Listed height: 6 ft 3 in (1.91 m)
- Listed weight: 219 lb (99 kg)

Career information
- High school: Mabank (TX)
- College: Louisiana–Monroe
- NFL draft: 2014: undrafted

Career history
- Winnipeg Blue Bombers (2014)*; Brooklyn Bolts (2014); Mesquite/Dallas Marshals (2015–2018)
- * Offseason or practice squad member only

Awards and highlights
- Sun Belt Offensive Player of the Year (2012); Second-team All-Sun Belt (2012); 3× Second-team All-Louisiana (2010–2012); Louisiana Freshman of the Year (2010); Freshman All-American (2010)
- Stats at CFL.ca (archive)

Kolton Ryan Browning (born October 17, 1990) is an American former football quarterback. He won a FXFL Championship with the Brooklyn Bolts in 2014. He was the starting quarterback for the ULM Warhawks from 2009 to 2013.

== College career ==
After being redshirted in 2009, Browning took over as the Warhawks starting quarterback in 2010. In 2012, he was the Sun Belt Conference Offensive Player of the Year and led the Warhawks to their first ever bowl game against Ohio University in the Independence Bowl in Shreveport, Louisiana. During his career he threw for 10,263 yards and 81 touchdowns. He finished his career with most TD passes and is second in passing yards, completions, and attempts at ULM.

== Professional career ==
Pre-draft measurables
Height	Weight	40-yard dash	10-yard split	20-yard split	20-yard shuttle	Three-cone drill	Vertical jump	Broad jump
6 ft 0 1/3 in (1.84 m)	219 lb (99 kg)	4.89 s	1.70 s	2.81 s	4.53 s	7.18 s	29.5 in (0.75 m)	9 ft 0 in (2.74 m)
All values from the ULM Pro Day

Browning was briefly invited to training camp with the Dallas Cowboys, but was never officially signed. He later signed with the Winnipeg Blue Bombers of the CFL, but was released soon afterwards to pursue a coaching opportunity. In October 2014, Browning signed with the Brooklyn Bolts of the new formed Fall Experimental Football League(FXFL).

In 2015, Browning signed with the Mesquite Marshals of Champions Indoor Football for the 2016 season. On July 27, 2017, Browning re-signed with the Marshals. On April 19, 2018, Browning was released by the Marshals.
