= 3–3–5 defense =

American football defensive formation

This version of the 3–3–5 removes a lineman to get the nickelback.

This version, usually called the 33 stack or 3–3–5 stack, uses an extra strong safety, and "stacks" linebackers and safeties directly behind the defensive linemen.

In American football, the 3–3–5 defense is a defensive alignment consisting of three down linemen, three linebackers, and five defensive backs. The 3–3–5 defense can also be referred to as the 3–3 stack or the spread defense. It is one form of the nickel defense, a generic term for a formation with five defensive backs. Veteran college football defensive coordinator Joe Lee Dunn is widely credited with being the main innovator of the 3–3–5 scheme.

This alignment is generally used when the defense is trying to confuse the offense by applying different blitz pressures on the offense while playing mostly zone or sometimes man coverage. This alignment is rarely used as a base defensive scheme as it lacks a fourth lineman or linebacker to stop the run like the 3-4 or 4-3, but is used by many high schools to counterattack the spread offense scheme. Boise State, West Virginia, BYU, SDSU and Arizona have used this formation with success in college football. Michigan ran this formation during the 2010 season. TCU uses this as a variant formation; its base defense is a different nickel set, the 4–2–5. In 2017 Iowa State adopted this defense as a counter to the air raid offenses commonly encountered in the Big 12 Conference.

Teams that run the 3–3–5 generally use it because they are a relatively fast but smaller unit compared to the opposing offense, and they want to cause blocking assignment issues for that offense. Also, a 3–3–5 can be adjusted to a 4–3, 3–4, or 4–4 defense with the same starting players.

To effectively play the 3–3–5, the "Front 8" (i.e., the eight defensive players closest to the line of scrimmage) must be physical and tough. The three down lineman must be able to control the running lanes, execute an effective pass rush, and be able to keep the opposing offensive line occupied so that the linebackers can make plays. The two outside or "Stud" linebackers must be effective at pressuring the offensive line and reading and reacting to the play as it develops. The middle linebacker (also known as the "Mike" linebacker) must be able to effectively move in the direction the play is going (also known as "flowing to the ball") while also being able to shed blockers and make plays.

The defensive secondary must be equally capable of pressuring the offensive lineman and dropping back into pass coverage. In the 3–3 stack version, the third safety (nicknamed the "Aztec" safety) must be a versatile athlete capable of dropping into coverage, pressuring the quarterback, or coming up in run support as a "Mike" linebacker would in a 3–4 alignment.

The 3–3–5 defense is often called a "bend but don't break" defense in that it often gives up big yardage, particularly "between the 20s", but gels in their Red zone (gridiron football). This is best exemplified by the 2008 West Virginia Mountaineers football defensive statistics; on average the team gave up 328 yards per game, but lead the nation in red zone efficiency, allowing their opponents to only score 68% of the time.

The 3–3–5 zone coverage is often vulnerable to short and medium pass routes over the middle, particularly in the "hole" and "hook" coverage zones.

== See also ==
- Nickel defense
