= North Texas Mean Green football statistical leaders =

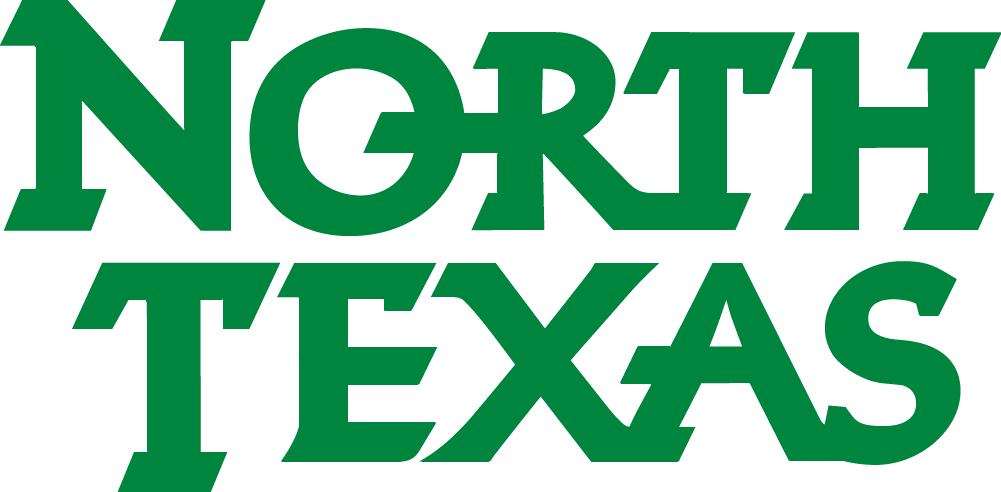

The North Texas Mean Green football statistical leaders are individual statistical leaders of the North Texas Mean Green football program in various categories, including passing, rushing, receiving, total offense, defensive stats, kicking, and scoring. Within those areas, the lists identify single-game, single-season, and career leaders. The Mean Green represents the University of North Texas in the NCAA Division I FBS American Conference.

Although North Texas began competing in intercollegiate football in 1913, the school's official record book considers the "modern era" to have begun in 1950. Records from before this year are often incomplete and inconsistent, and they are generally not included in these lists.

These lists are dominated by more recent players for several reasons:

- Since 1950, seasons have increased from 10 games to 11 and then 12 games in length.
- The NCAA didn't allow freshmen to play varsity football until 1972 (with the exception of the World War II years), allowing players to have four-year careers.
- Bowl games only began counting toward single-season and career statistics in 2002. The Mean Green has played in 12 bowl games since this decision, giving many recent players an extra game to accumulate statistics.
- Conference USA, in which UNT was a member from 2013 to 2022, has held a championship game since 2005. North Texas played in this game twice (2017 and 2022), giving players in each season yet another game to amass statistics. UNT's current home of the American also holds a championship game, and the Mean Green played in the 2025 edition.
- Due to COVID-19 issues, the NCAA ruled that the 2020 season would not count against the athletic eligibility of any football player, giving everyone who played in that season the opportunity for five years of eligibility instead of the normal four.
- From 2018 through 2025, players were allowed to participate in as many as four games in a redshirt season; previously, playing in even one game "burned" the redshirt. In 2024 and 2025, postseason games did not count against the four-game limit. These changes to redshirt rules have given very recent players several extra games to accumulate statistics.
- A more recent change that will have a major effect on future career leaderboards was introduced in 2026 with full implementation starting with the 2027 freshman class. Going forward, redshirting will be prohibited, but players will have five years of full athletic eligibility, provided that they are no older than 19 when they first enroll in a postsecondary institution. Players who had remaining eligibility under previous rules at the end of the 2025 season will benefit from the new rule.

These lists are updated through Week 3 of the 2026 season. Players active for UNT in 2026 are in bold.

== Passing ==
=== Passing yards ===
Career
Rk	Player	Yards	Years
1	Mason Fine	12,505	2016 2017 2018 2019
2	Mitch Maher	8,519	1991 1992 1993 1994
3	Derek Thompson	7,447	2009 2010 2011 2012 2013
4	Austin Aune	7,324	2019 2020 2021 2022
5	Steve Ramsey	7,076	1967 1968 1969
6	Scott Davis	6,923	1987 1988 1989 1990
7	Scott Hall	5,975	2000 2001 2002 2003 2004
8	Giovanni Vizza	5,146	2007 2008
9	Drew Mestemaker	4,841	2024 2025
10	Jason Mills	3,981	1994 1995 1996 1997

Single season
Rk	Player	Yards	Year
1	Drew Mestemaker	4,379	2025
2	Mason Fine	4,052	2017
3	Mason Fine	3,793	2018
4	Chandler Morris	3,774	2024
5	Austin Aune	3,547	2022
6	Chandler Rogers	3,382	2023
7	Mitch Maher	3,103	1994
8	Mason Fine	3,088	2019
9	Derek Thompson	2,896	2013
10	Steve Ramsey	2,828	1969

Single game
Rk	Player	Yards	Year	Opponent
1	Drew Mestemaker	608	2025	Charlotte
2	Daniel Meager	601	2007	SMU
3	Steve Ramsey	495	1969	Louisiana-Lafayette
4	**Tayven Jackson**	492	2026	Texas State
5	Mitch Maher	486	1994	Stephen F. Austin
6	Giovanni Vizza	478	2007	Navy
7	Drew Mestemaker	469	2025	Rice
8	Chandler Morris	449	2024	Tulane
9	Chandler Morris	445	2024	Memphis
10	Mason Fine	444	2018	SMU

=== Passing touchdowns ===
Career
Rk	Player	TDs	Years
1	Mason Fine	93	2016 2017 2018 2019
2	Steve Ramsey	69	1967 1968 1969
3	Mitch Maher	67	1991 1992 1993 1994
4	Austin Aune	56	2019 2020 2021 2022
5	Scott Hall	50	2000 2001 2002 2003 2004
6	Derek Thompson	42	2009 2010 2011 2012 2013
7	Scott Davis	41	1987 1988 1989 1990
8	Drew Mestemaker	36	2024 2025
9	Jason Mills	32	1995 1996 1997
	Giovanni Vizza	32	2007 2008

Single season
Rk	Player	TDs	Year
1	Drew Mestemaker	34	2025
2	Austin Aune	33	2022
2	Mason Fine	31	2017
	Chandler Morris	31	2024
5	Mason Fine	29	2019
	Chandler Rogers	29	2023
7	Mason Fine	27	2018
8	Mitch Maher	26	1994
9	Steve Ramsey	24	1968
	Steve Ramsey	24	1969
	Mitch Maher	24	1993

Single game
Rk	Player	TDs	Year	Opponent
1	Giovanni Vizza	8	2007	Navy
2	Steve Ramsey	5	1968	Cincinnati
	Steve Ramsey	5	1968	UTEP
	Steve Ramsey	5	1969	Southwestern Louisiana
	Mason Fine	5	2019	Charlotte
	Austin Aune	5	2020	UTEP
	Austin Aune	5	2022	FIU
	Chandler Rogers	5	2023	Memphis
	Chandler Morris	5	2024	Tulsa
	**Tayven Jackson**	5	2026	Charlotte

== Rushing ==
=== Rushing yards ===
Career
Rk	Player	Yards	Years
1	Lance Dunbar	4,224	2008 2009 2010 2011
2	Patrick Cobbs	4,100	2001 2002 2003 2004 2005
3	Jamario Thomas	3,496	2004 2005 2006 2007
4	DeAndre Torrey	3,228	2018 2019 2020 2021
5	Jeffery Wilson	3,205	2014 2015 2016 2017
6	Ja’Quay Wilburn	3,120	1997 1998 1999 2000
7	Kevin Galbreath	2,523	2001 2002
8	Ayo Adeyi	2,320	2021 2022 2023
9	Bernard Jackson	2,256	1977 1978 1979 1980
10	Darrin Collins	2,220	1986 1987 1988 1989

Single season
Rk	Player	Yards	Year
1	Jamario Thomas	1,801	2004
2	Patrick Cobbs	1,680	2003
3	Lance Dunbar	1,553	2010
4	Bernard Jackson	1,453	1978
5	Caleb Hawkins	1,434	2025
6	Lance Dunbar	1,378	2009
7	Kevin Galbreath	1,298	2002
8	DeAndre Torrey	1,215	2021
9	Patrick Cobbs	1,154	2005
10	Malcolm Jones	1,144	1980

Single game
Rk	Player	Yards	Year	Opponent
1	Lance Dunbar	313	2011	Middle Tennessee
2	Jamario Thomas	291	2004	Idaho
3	Lance Dunbar	270	2010	Kansas State
4	Jamario Thomas	258	2004	New Mexico State
5	Jamario Thomas	256	2004	Utah State
6	Brandin Byrd	251	2013	Tulsa
7	Patrick Cobbs	249	2003	Idaho
8	Malcolm Jones	247	1980	Northeast Louisiana
	Jamario Thomas	247	2004	Colorado
10	DeAndre Torrey	244	2021	Northwestern State

=== Rushing touchdowns ===
Career
Rk	Player	TDs	Years
1	Lance Dunbar	41	2008 2009 2010 2011
2	Patrick Cobbs	36	2001 2002 2003 2004 2005
	DeAndre Torrey	36	2018 2019 2020 2021
4	Jeffery Wilson	32	2014 2015 2016 2017
5	Scott Davis	29	1987 1988 1989 1990
6	Jamario Thomas	27	2004 2005 2006 2007
7	Ken Bahnsen	26	1950 1951 1952
8	Caleb Hawkins	25	2025
9	Terrance Brown	20	1992 1993
10	Abner Haynes	19	1957 1958 1959
	Mike Jones	19	1974 1975 1976 1977

Single season
Rk	Player	TDs	Year
1	Caleb Hawkins	25	2025
2	Patrick Cobbs	19	2003
3	Jamario Thomas	17	2004
	Lance Dunbar	17	2009
5	DeAndre Torrey	15	2018
6	Jeffery Wilson	14	2016
7	Lance Dunbar	13	2010
	DeAndre Torrey	13	2021
9	Mike Jones	12	1977
10	Abner Haynes	11	1959
	Scott Davis	11	1990
	Scott Davis	11	1988
	Brandin Byrd	11	2013

Single game
Rk	Player	TDs	Year	Opponent
1	Caleb Hawkins	5	2025	UAB
2	Scott Davis	4	1988	Eastern Washington
	Patrick Cobbs	4	2002	Louisiana-Monroe
	Jamario Thomas	4	2004	Idaho
	Lance Dunbar	4	2009	Louisiana-Lafayette
	Lance Dunbar	4	2011	Middle Tennessee
	Caleb Hawkins	4	2025	Army
	Caleb Hawkins	4	2025	Navy
	Caleb Hawkins	4	2025	Temple
	Jahiem White	4	2026	Houston Christian

== Receiving ==
=== Receptions ===
Career
Rk	Player	Rec	Years
1	Jaelon Darden	230	2017 2018 2019 2020
2	Casey Fitzgerald	229	2005 2006 2007 2008
3	Carlos Harris	197	2012 2013 2014 2015
4	Johnny Quinn	187	2003 2004 2005 2006
5	David Brown	182	1991 1992 1993 1994
6	Pete Harvey	164	1978 1979 1980 1981
7	Roderic Burns	153	2019 2020 2021 2022 2023
8	John Love	144	1965 1966
	Ron Shanklin	144	1967 1968 1969
10	Michael Lawrence	143	2016 2017 2018 2019

Single season
Rk	Player	Rec	Year
1	Casey Fitzgerald	113	2008
2	Casey Fitzgerald	111	2007
3	Marvin Walker	91	1982
4	Brandon Jackson	79	2007
5	John Love	76	1965
	Jaelon Darden	76	2019
7	Jaelon Darden	74	2020
8	Barry Moore	71	1969
	Jamaal Jackson	71	2009
10	Darnell Smith	70	2013
	Carlos Harris	70	2014
	Wyatt Young	70	2025

Single game
Rk	Player	Rec	Year	Opponent
1	Marvin Walker	22	1982	Tulsa
2	Casey Fitzgerald	18	2007	SMU
3	Carlos Harris	15	2014	Southern Miss
4	John Love	14	1965	Arkansas
	Peter Harvey	14	1981	Northeast Louisiana
	Casey Fitzgerald	14	2007	Louisiana-Lafayette
	Casey Fitzgerald	14	2008	Troy
	Casey Fitzgerald	14	2008	Louisiana-Lafayette
9	Casey Fitzgerald	13	2007	Navy
	Darnell Smith	13	2013	UTSA
	Jaelon Darden	13	2020	Southern Miss
	Jaelon Darden	13	2020	Charlotte

=== Receiving yards ===
Career
Rk	Player	Yards	Years
1	Jaelon Darden	2,782	2017 2018 2019 2020
2	Johnny Quinn	2,718	2003 2004 2005 2006
3	Troy Redwine	2,567	1992 1993 1994 1995
4	Casey Fitzgerald	2,533	2005 2006 2007 2008
5	Ron Shanklin	2,465	1967 1968 1969
6	David Brown	2,402	1991 1992 1993 1994
7	Carlos Harris	2,396	2012 2013 2014 2015
8	Barry Moore	2,183	1968 1969
9	John Love	2,124	1965 1966
	Roderic Burns	2,124	2019 2020 2021 2022 2023

Single season
Rk	Player	Yards	Year
1	Casey Fitzgerald	1,322	2007
2	Wyatt Young	1,264	2025
3	Jaelon Darden	1,190	2020
4	John Love	1,130	1966
	Barry Moore	1,130	1969
6	Casey Fitzgerald	1,119	2008
7	David Brown	1,013	1968
8	Ja'Mori Maclin	1,004	2023
9	John Love	994	1965
10	Marcus Camper	938	1988

Single game
Rk	Player	Yards	Year	Opponent
1	Casey Fitzgerald	327	2007	SMU
2	Wyatt Young	295	2025	Rice
3	Jaelon Darden	244	2020	Charlotte
4	Scott Ford	231	1992	Abilene Christian
	Casey Fitzgerald	231	2008	Louisiana–Lafayette
6	Damon Ward Jr.	230	2024	South Alabama
7	Barry Moore	228	1968	UTEP
8	Marcus Camper	224	1988	Texas
9	John Love	220	1966	Chattanooga
10	Barry Moore	217	1969	Southwestern Louisiana

=== Receiving touchdowns ===
Career
Rk	Player	TDs	Years
1	Jaelon Darden	38	2017 2018 2019 2020
2	Ron Shanklin	31	1967 1968 1969
3	Troy Redwine	23	1992 1993 1994 1995
4	David Brown	22	1991 1992 1993 1994
5	Johnny Quinn	21	2003 2004 2005 2006
6	Casey Fitzgerald	20	2005 2006 2007 2008
	Jyaire Shorter	20	2018 2019 2020 2021 2022
8	John Love	17	1965 1966
9	George Marshall	15	1999 2000 2001 2002
10	James Russell	14	1965 1966 1967
	Marcus Camper	14	1985 1986 1987 1988
	Damon Ward Jr.	14	2021 2022 2023 2024

Single season
Rk	Player	TDs	Year
1	Jaelon Darden	19	2020
2	Ron Shanklin	13	1967
3	Casey Fitzgerald	12	2007
	Jaelon Darden	12	2019
5	Marvin Walker	11	1982
	David Brown	11	1994
	George Marshall	11	2001
	Jyaire Shorter	11	2022
	Ja'Mori Maclin	11	2023
	DT Sheffield	11	2024

Single game
Rk	Player	TDs	Year	Opponent
1	Casey Fitzgerald	5	2007	Navy
2	Jaelon Darden	4	2020	UTEP
3	Barry Moore	3	1968	UTEP
	John Love	3	1966	Wichita State
	John Love	3	1966	Chattanooga
	Ron Shanklin	3	1969	Tulsa
	David Kervin	3	1973	Wichita State
	Charlie Murray	3	1978	Northeast Louisiana
	Troy Redwine	3	1995	Oregon State
	Johnny Quinn	3	2007	Louisiana
	Jaelon Darden	3	2020	Houston Baptist
	Jaelon Darden	3	2020	Charlotte
	Jaelon Darden	3	2020	Louisiana Tech
	Jyaire Shorter	3	2022	Florida Atlantic
	Roderic Burns	3	2023	Memphis
	DT Sheffield	3	2024	Stephen F. Austin
	Wyatt Young	3	2025	UTSA

== Total offense ==
Total offense is the sum of passing and rushing statistics. It does not include receiving or returns.

=== Total offense yards ===
Career
Rk	Player	Yards	Years
1	Mason Fine	9,571	2016 2017 2018
2	Mitch Maher	9,006	1991 1992 1993 1994
3	Scott Davis	8,436	1987 1988 1989 1990
4	Derek Thompson	7,760	2009 2010 2011 2012 2013
5	Austin Aune	7,730	2019 2020 2021 2022
6	Steve Ramsey	6,568	1967 1968 1969
7	Scott Hall	6,440	2000 2001 2002 2003 2004
8	Giovanni Vizza	5,631	2007 2008
9	Drew Mestemaker	5,017	2024 2025
10	Ken Washington	4,313	1974 1975 1976 1977

Single season
Rk	Player	Yards	Year
1	Drew Mestemaker	4,468	2025
2	Mason Fine	4,068	2017
3	Chandler Morris	4,016	2024
4	Mason Fine	3,813	2018
5	Austin Aune	3,599	2022
6	Chandler Rogers	3,562	2023
7	Mitch Maher	3,280	1994
8	Derek Thompson	3,053	2013
9	Giovanni Vizza	2,944	2008
10	Scott Davis	2,848	1988

Single game
Rk	Player	Yards	Year	Opponent
1	Drew Mestemaker	601	2025	Charlotte
2	Daniel Meager	597	2007	SMU
3	Giovanni Vizza	571	2007	Navy
4	Chandler Morris	516	2024	Memphis
5	**Tayven Jackson**	510	2026	Texas State
6	Mitch Maher	491	1994	Stephen F. Austin
7	Steve Ramsey	483	1969	Southwestern Louisiana
8	Drew Mestemaker	470	2025	Rice
9	Chandler Morris	469	2024	Tulane
10	Drew Mestemaker	448	2024	Texas State

=== Touchdowns responsible for ===
"Touchdowns responsible for" is the NCAA's official term for combined passing and rushing touchdowns. UNT calls this statistic "touchdown responsibility" in its official record book.

Career
Rk	Player	TDs	Years
1	Mitch Maher	84	1991 1992 1993 1994
2	Steve Ramsey	71	1967 1968 1969
3	Scott Davis	70	1987 1988 1989 1990
4	Mason Fine	69	2016 2017 2018
5	Austin Aune	62	2019 2020 2021 2022
6	Scott Hall	57	2000 2001 2002 2003 2004
7	Derek Thompson	50	2009 2010 2011 2012 2013
8	Drew Mestemaker	42	2024 2025
9	Lance Dunbar	41	2008 2009 2010 2011
10	Patrick Cobbs	38	2001 2002 2003 2004 2005

Single season
Rk	Player	TDs	Year
1	Drew Mestemaker	39	2025
2	Chandler Morris	35	2024
3	Austin Aune	34	2022
4	Chandler Rogers	33	2023
5	Mason Fine	32	2017
6	Mitch Maher	31	1993
7	Mitch Maher	30	1994
8	Mason Fine	29	2018
9	Steve Ramsey	25	1969
	Caleb Hawkins	25	2025

Single game
Rk	Player	TDs	Year	Opponent
1	Giovanni Vizza	8	2007	Navy

== Defense ==
=== Interceptions ===
Career
Rk	Player	Ints	Years
1	Bill Brashier	19	1949 1950 1951
2	Lyndon Fox	18	1969 1970 1971
3	Lenny Dunlap	13	1969 1970
	J. T. Smith	13	1975 1976 1977
5	Bernie Barbour	11	1967 1968 1969
	Don McGee	11	1999 2000 2001 2002
	Jonas Buckles	11	2001 2002 2003 2004

Single season
Rk	Player	Ints	Year
1	Bill Brashier	10	1951
2	Lyndon Fox	8	1969
3	Ray Toole	7	1957
	Billy Ryan	7	1962
	Lenny Dunlap	7	1970
	Marty Morrison	7	1978
	David Morris	7	1980

Single game
Rk	Player	Ints	Year	Opponent
1	James Potts	3	1915	Decatur Baptist
	Bill Sheffield	3	1940	Stephen F. Austin
	Bill Brashier	3	1951	Houston
	James Wright	3	1961	Louisville
	Ret Little	3	1967	Louisville
	Mike Shook	3	1967	Cincinnati
	Bernie Barbour	3	1968	Louisville
	Lenny Dunlap	3	1969	Drake
	Lenny Dunlap	3	1969	BYU
	Wilmer Levels	3	1970	Drake
	Ken Fontno	3	1971	Wichita State

=== Tackles ===
Career
Rk	Player	Tackles	Years
1	KD Davis	428	2018 2019 2020 2021 2022
1	Byron Gross	418	1987 1988 1989 1990
2	Craig Robertson	381	2006 2007 2008 2009 2010
3	Brad Kassell	365	1998 1999 2000 2001
	Zach Orr	365	2010 2011 2012 2013
5	Lester Harper	362	1980 1981 1982 1983
6	Burks Washington	351	1975 1976 1977 1978
7	Lance White	325	1983 1984 1985 1986

Single season
Rk	Player	Tackles	Year
1	Trent Touchstone	143	1989
2	KD Davis	137	2022
3	Craig Robertson	133	2010
4	Lance White	126	1984
	Brent Koch	126	1991
6	Zach Orr	123	2013
7	Byron Gross	122	1990
8	Cody Spencer	121	2003
9	Walter Chapman	120	1977
	Chris Hurd	120	2003
	KD Davis	120	2021

=== Sacks ===
Career
Rk	Player	Sacks	Years
1	Willis Hudson	24.0	1991 1992 1993 1994 1995
2	Roderick Manning	20.0	1986 1987 1988 1989
	Adrian Awasom	20.0	2001 2002 2003 2004
4	Corbin Montgomery	19.5	1997 1998 1999
5	Scott Blank	18.0	1997 1998
6	Brandon Akpunku	17.0	2008 2009 2010 2011
	LaDarius Hamilton	17.0	2016 2017 2018 2019
8	Brandon Kennedy	16.5	2000 2001 2002 2003
9	Jeremiah Chapman	15.5	2004 2005 2006 2007
10	Aaron Bellazin	15.0	2010 2011 2012 2013

Single season
Rk	Player	Sacks	Year
1	Willis Hudson	14.5	1994
2	Roderick Manning	13.0	1989
	Scott Blank	13.0	1997
4	Ronnie Hickman	12.0	1983
5	Matt Tiemann	11.0	1985
6	Brad Spinks	10.0	1996
	Brandon Kennedy	10.0	2002
8	Rex Johnson	9.0	1988
	Aaron Bellazin	9.0	2013
10	Willis Hudson	8.5	1995
	LaDarius Hamilton	8.5	2019
	Grayson Murphy	8.5	2021

Single game
Rk	Player	Sacks	Year	Opponent
1	Corbin Montgomery	3.0	1999	Texas Tech
	Darrell Daniels	3.0	2002	ULM
	Evan Cardwell	3.0	2003	Baylor
	Adrian Awasom	3.0	2004	Utah State
	Tillman Johnson	3.0	2014	Nicholls
	Jarrian Roberts	3.0	2015	Rice
	Grayson Murphy	3.0	2021	UTSA
	Mazin Richards	3.0	2022	Louisiana Tech
9	K. C. Obi	2.5	2012	Florida Atlantic
	Aaron Bellazin	2.5	2013	UTEP
	Grayson Murphy	2.5	2021	Liberty
	Roderick Brown	2.5	2022	Louisiana Tech

== Kicking ==
=== Field goals made ===
Career
Rk	Player	FGs	Years
1	Trevor Moore	53	2014 2015 2016 2017
2	Ethan Mooney	52	2019 2020 2021 2022
3	Keith Chapman	49	1985 1986 1987 1988 1989
4	Nick Bazaldua	42	2002 2003 2004 2005
5	Zach Olen	32	2010 2011 2012 2013
6	Garrett Courtney	29	1987 1988
7	Todd Smith	27	1983 1984 1985 1986
8	Iseed Khoury	26	1975 1976 1977
	Jeff Graham	26	1994 1995 1996

Single season
Rk	Player	FGs	Year
1	Keith Chapman	19	1989
	Cole Hedlund	19	2018
3	Ethan Mooney	18	2022
4	Ethan Mooney	16	2019
	Noah Rauschenberg	16	2023
6	Denis Hopovac	15	2006
	Trevor Moore	15	2014
8	Whit Smith	14	1980
	Keith Chapman	14	1987
	Keith Chapman	14	1988
	Jeff Graham	14	1996
	Garrett Courtney	14	1997
	Nick Bazaldua	14	2004

Single game
Rk	Player	FGs	Year	Opponent
1	Trevor Moore	5	2014	SMU
	Denis Hopovac	5	2006	FIU
	Garrett Courtney	5	1997	Utah State
4	Iseed Khoury	4	1976	SMU
	Garrett Courtney	4	1998	New Mexico State
	Zach Olen	4	2010	Arkansas State
	Zach Paul	4	2013	Ball State
	Trevor Moore	4	2014	UTSA
	Noah Rauschenberg	4	2023	Louisiana Tech

=== Field goal percentage ===
UNT requires a minimum of 25 career attempts, and 10 attempts in a season, to be included in its official record book.

Career
Rk	Player	FG%	Years
1	Noah Rauschenberg	84.2%	2023
2	Trevor Moore	80.3%	2014 2015 2016 2017
3	Kali Nguma	79.3%	2024 2025
4	Ethan Mooney	76.5%	2019 2020 2021 2022
5	Garrett Courtney	74.4%	1997 1998
6	Jeff Graham	74.3%	1994 1995 1996
7	Richard DeFelice	72.0%	1992 1993
8	Denis Hopovac	71.4%	2003 2004 2005 2006
9	Keith Chapman	69.0%	1985 1986 1987 1988 1989
10	Jeremy Knott	68.8%	2008 2009

Single season
Rk	Player	FG%	Year
1	Kali Nguma	92.3%	2025
2	Trevor Moore	90.9%	2017
3	Trevor Moore	88.2%	2014
4	Garrett Courtney	87.5%	1997
5	Zach Olen	86.7%	2010
6	Cole Hedlund	86.4%	2018
7	Ethan Mooney	85.7%	2022
8	Ethan Mooney	84.6%	2021
9	Noah Rauschenberg	84.2%	2023
10	Jason Ball	81.8%	1999

== Scoring ==
=== Total points ===
Career
Rk	Player	Pts	Years
1	Ethan Mooney	331	2019 2020 2021 2022
2	Trevor Moore	313	2014 2015 2016 2017
3	Lance Dunbar	294	2008 2009 2010 2011
4	Nick Bazaldua	247	2002 2003 2004 2005
5	DeAndre Torrey	246	2018 2019 2020 2021
6	Jaelon Darden	236	2017 2018 2019 2020
	Keith Chapman	236	1985 1986 1987 1988 1989
8	Patrick Cobbs	228	2001 2002 2003 2004 2005
9	Jeffery Wilson	204	2014 2015 2016 2017
10	Kali Nguma	194	2024 2025

Single season
Rk	Player	Pts	Year
1	Caleb Hawkins	174	2025
2	Patrick Cobbs	126	2003
3	Lance Dunbar	114	2009
	Jaelon Darden	114	2020
5	Cole Hedlund	108	2018
	DeAndre Torrey	108	2018
	Ethan Mooney	108	2022
8	Kali Nguma	106	2025
9	Jamario Thomas	102	2004
10	Michael Jones	98	2004

=== Touchdowns scored ===
In contrast to "touchdowns responsible for", this lists touchdowns scored. It includes rushing, receiving, and return touchdowns, but not passing touchdowns.

Career
Rk	Player	TDs	Years
1	Lance Dunbar	49	2008 2009 2010 2011
2	DeAndre Torrey	41	2018 2019 2020 2021
3	Jaelon Darden	39	2017 2018 2019 2020
4	Patrick Cobbs	38	2001 2002 2003 2004 2005
5	Jeffery Wilson	34	2014 2015 2016 2017
6	Ron Shanklin	31	1967 1968 1969
7	Scott Davis	29	1987 1988 1989 1990
	Caleb Hawkins	29	2025
9	Jamario Thomas	27	2004 2005 2006 2007
10	Ken Bahnsen	26	1950 1951 1952

Single season
Rk	Player	TDs	Year
1	Caleb Hawkins	29	2025
2	Patrick Cobbs	21	2003
3	Lance Dunbar	19	2009
	Jaelon Darden	19	2020
5	DeAndre Torrey	18	2018
6	Jamario Thomas	17	2004
7	Lance Dunbar	16	2010
	Jeffery Wilson	16	2014
9	Jeffery Wilson	15	2018
10	DeAndre Torrey	14	2021
