= Drew Mestemaker =

American football player (born 2006)

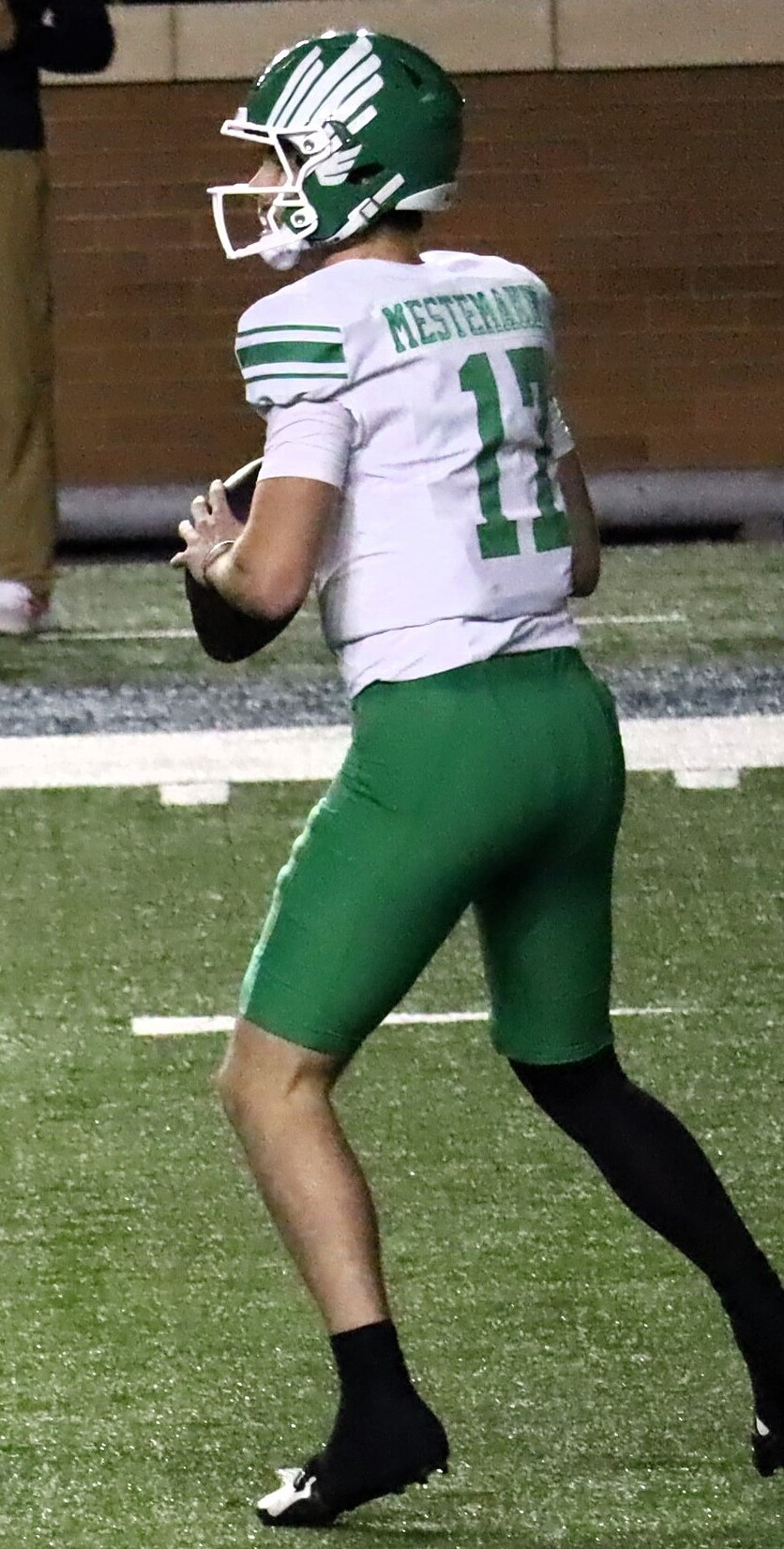
- Mestemaker with North Texas in 2025

No. 17 – Oklahoma State Cowboys
- Position: Quarterback
- Class: Redshirt Sophomore

Personal information
- Born: January 2006 (age 20)
- Listed height: 6 ft 3 in (1.91 m)
- Listed weight: 215 lb (98 kg)

Career information
- High school: Vandegrift (Austin, Texas)
- College: North Texas (2024–2025); Oklahoma State (2026–present)

Awards and highlights
- Burlsworth Trophy (2025); NCAA passing yards leader (2025); American Conference Offensive Player of the Year (2025); First-team All-American Conference (2025)
- Stats at ESPN

Drew Torin Mestemaker (MES-te-mah-kur; born January 2006) is an American college football quarterback for the Oklahoma State Cowboys. Prior to transferring in 2026, Mestemaker played for the North Texas Mean Green in the 2024 and 2025 seasons.

== Early life ==
Mestemaker attended Vandegrift High School in Austin, Texas. He saw limited playing time at the quarterback position during his high school football career. As a junior in 2022, he served as the backup to Brayden Buchanan, who later played college baseball for the Baylor Bears baseball program. In limited action, Mestemaker completed 12 of 13 passes for 170 yards and three touchdowns.

During his senior season in 2023, Mestemaker again served as a backup, this time to Louisville Cardinals commit Deuce Adams, who had transferred from Canyon High School the previous year. He completed 10 of 17 passes for 146 yards and two touchdowns. He also contributed on defense, playing defensive back and safety, where he earned honorable mention all-district recognition.

Mestemaker additionally served as Vandegrift’s primary punter, averaging 34.7 yards per punt on 15 attempts, including six punts inside the 20-yard line. He was named second team All-District 25-6A on special teams.

A zero-star recruit who never started a varsity game in high school, Mestemaker committed to play college football for the North Texas as a walk-on.

== College career ==
=== North Texas ===
Mestemaker enrolled at the University of North Texas on June 1, 2024, joining the program under head coach Eric Morris. He began fall camp as the team’s fifth-string quarterback but moved up the depth chart during preseason practices, emerging as the primary backup to starting quarterback Chandler Morris by the final scrimmage before the 2024 season opener.

Mestemaker made his collegiate debut in Week 3 against Texas Tech, completing two of three pass attempts for 56 yards while adding 26 rushing yards. He appeared sparingly in three additional games during the 2024 regular season. After Chandler Morris entered the NCAA transfer portal, Mestemaker was named the starter for the 2025 First Responder Bowl. In the game, he completed 26 of 41 passes for 393 yards with two touchdowns and two interceptions, and added a 70-yard rushing touchdown in a loss to Texas State. He finished the 2024 season with 462 passing yards, two touchdown passes, and two interceptions.

Heading into the 2025 season, Mestemaker competed for the starting quarterback job against Miami transfer Reese Poffenbarger. On August 19, 2025, he was officially named North Texas’ starting quarterback for the season opener.

In Week 1 against Lamar, Mestemaker threw for 329 yards and three touchdowns in a 51–0 victory. North Texas then earned wins over Western Michigan (the 2025 MAC champions), Washington State, Army, and South Alabama, starting the season 5–0. During that stretch, Mestemaker maintained an 11-to-0 touchdown-to-interception ratio while completing nearly 68 percent of his passes for 1,247 yards.

After a loss to South Florida, in which he threw for 336 yards with two touchdowns and three interceptions, Mestemaker and the Mean Green rebounded with six consecutive victories. This stretch included a historic performance against Charlotte, where he threw for a school and AAC record 608 yards and four touchdowns with one interception in a 54–20 win.

Mestemaker led North Texas to the 2025 American Conference Football Championship Game against Tulane (North Texas lost, 21 to 34, with Mestemaker going 21 for 34 for 294 yards with two touchdowns and three interceptions). In the 2025 New Mexico Bowl against San Diego State, he threw for 250 yards and three touchdowns with two interceptions, helping North Texas win 49–47. The victory secured the program’s first-ever 12-win season and snapped a seven-game bowl losing streak.

He finished the 2025 season with 4,379 passing yards and 34 passing touchdowns, setting single-season program records in both categories. He accounted for 4,468 total offensive yards and 39 total touchdowns, establishing new program marks for total offense and total touchdowns. For his outstanding performance, he was named American Offensive Player of the Year, earned First Team All-AAC honors, and won the Burlsworth Trophy.

On December 29, 2025, Mestemaker announced that he would be entering the transfer portal.

Mestemaker was a highly touted transfer portal prospect, being considered a top ten player in many transfer portal rankings.

=== Oklahoma State ===
On January 3, 2026, Mestemaker announced his commitment to Oklahoma State University, reuniting with head coach Eric Morris, under whom he had played at North Texas. He signed a two-year, $7 million deal with the program. Mestemaker made his Oklahoma State debut in the 2026 season opener against Tulsa, completing 29 of 49 passes for 241 yards, one touchdown, and two interceptions in a 24–10 loss. The following week against No. 6 Oregon, Mestemaker led Oklahoma State to a 39–31 upset victory. He completed 26 of 43 passes for 317 yards, two touchdowns, and two interceptions, while rushing for 109 yards and a touchdown. His 10-yard touchdown run in the fourth quarter gave Oklahoma State the lead and proved to be the game-winning score. During the play, he evaded a sack and scrambled before leaping at the goal line, absorbing a hit and flipping into the end zone. The victory snapped Oklahoma State's 21-game losing streak against FBS opponents dating back to the 2024 season. Following the game, Mestemaker said, "This is the best moment of my life honestly, not even close." He was subsequently named the Big 12 Co-Offensive Player of the Week, among other weekly honors.

=== Statistics ===
Legend
	Led FBS
**Bold**	Career high

Year	Team	Games			Passing								Rushing			
Year	Team	GP	GS	Record	Cmp	Att	Pct	Yds	Y/A	TD	Int	Rtg	Att	Yds	Avg	TD
2024	North Texas	5	1	0−1	30	46	65.2	462	**10.0**	2	2	155.2	14	87	**6.2**	1
2025	North Texas	**14**	**14**	**12−2**	**319**	**463**	**68.9**	**4,379**	9.5	**34**	9	**168.7**	**57**	**89**	1.6	**5**
2026	Oklahoma State	11	11	7−4	263	391	67.3	3,533	9.0	30	**11**	162.6	47	158	3.4	4
Career		30	26	19–7	612	900	68.0	8,374	9.3	66	22	165.5	118	334	2.8	10
