= Jamario =

Jamario is a given name. Notable people with the name include:

- Jamario Moon (born 1980), American basketball player
- Jamario Thomas (born 1985), American football player
