= Zeke Martin =

American gridiron football player (1924–2006)

No. 43, 55 – North Texas Mean Green
- Positions: QB, P, DB

Personal information
- Born: September 26, 1924; Denton, Texas, U.S.
- Died: November 27, 2006 (aged 82); Fort Worth, Texas, U.S.
- Listed height: 6 ft 1 in (1.85 m)
- Listed weight: 195 lb (88 kg)

Career information
- High school: Denton
- College: Texas (1944); North Texas (1947–1950)

Awards and highlights
- North Texas Athletic Hall of Fame (1989); 2× All-GCC (1949, 1950); LSC champions (1947); GCC co-champions (1950)

Cecil Francis "Zeke" Martin (September 26, 1924 – November 27, 2006) was a college and pro athlete, high school coach, businessman and mayor from Denton, Texas. He was a two-time all-conference quarterback at North Texas State College from 1947 to 1950 and had previously started 1 game for the Texas Longhorns football team in 1944. He was drafted by the Washington Redskins in 1951 and played professionally for the Hamilton Tiger-Cats in Canada during the 1951 season. He coached high school football for nearly a decade and then became a successful businessman, the mayor of Denton, Texas and a candidate for the Texas state legislature.

== Early life ==
Martin was born in Denton, TX as the son of a carpenter and one of seven brothers. He was a three-sport high school athlete, winning honors in each. On the tennis team he won the 1941 County Class A singles Title, in basketball he was All-District in 1940 and 1941 and in Football he was 2nd team All-State in 1942. After graduation, Martin joined the Merchant Marines, in which he would remain for the next four years.

== Playing career ==
=== Texas ===
In 1944, Martin was a freshman football player at the University of Texas, backing up the legendary Bobby Layne on a team whose roster, like most schools', was thin due to World War II. Before the second game of the season, Layne was injured and Martin replaced him at quarterback against #4 Randolph Field. Randolph Field fielded a team of college all-stars that Texas and Martin had difficulty competing with. He threw 12 passes for 170 yards and 1 touchdown, but also threw a school record 5 interceptions in a game that Texas lost 42–6. The next week, with Layne back in the lineup, Martin threw a touchdown pass in a 20–0 win over Oklahoma, his last in a Longhorn jersey. A few days after the Oklahoma game, Martin re-entered the United States Coast Guard Maritime Service.

Martin did not return to the University of Texas, but spent the intervening years involved in World War II and amateur sports. In the spring of 1946, he played center field for the amateur Denton Bears of the Brazos-Trinity Baseball League, one of many amateur leagues to form after World War II. The following winter, he was on the SMU basketball team, but did not play much.

=== North Texas ===
After four years, Martin was discharged from the Merchant Marines in 1947 and enrolled at the University of North Texas, where he would play football with future NFL Pro-Bowler Ray Renfro. The school was then known as North Texas State Teachers College and would change its name to North Texas State College in Martin's senior year. At UNT he was a four-year letterman, played quarterback, defensive back and punter and twice made the all-conference team as quarterback.

In 1947, he started out as the #3 quarterback on the team, but eventual became the #2 quarterback backing up Fred McCain. North Texas, fresh off its first ever bowl win, won the Lone Star Conference title for the second year in a row and went 10–1 in the regular season. They beat the favored University of Florida, in Gainesville, and their only regular season blemish was a 12–0 loss to defending Southwest Conference champion Arkansas. The Eagles made their second straight bowl appearance, this time at the Salad Bowl in Phoenix, Arizona against Nevada. In that game they were down 13–6 late in the 4th quarter when Martin threw what would have been the game-tying touchdown pass, but the ball went right through the hands on the intended receiver, and the Eagles lost. Though no official statistics exist for the season, Martin threw at least 3 touchdown passes for at least 46 yards.

With McCain's graduation, Martin took over as starting quarterback in 1948. There are no official statistics available for Martin in 1947 or 1948, but according to media reports, he threw for 755 yards, 2nd best in the conference, and rushed for 32. With three games left, he had 5 touchdowns and scored one more in the last game for a total of 6. The team went 6–4 that year, and Martin was able to get revenge on Randolph AFB for his 1944 outing at Texas by leading North Texas to an 86–0 victory over them.

In 1949, North Texas' first year in the Gulf Coast Conference, Martin led the conference in passing and made the All-Gulf Coast Conference team. He went 71 of 179, for 1,416 yards and 18 touchdowns and had an average punt distance of 38.9 yards. North Texas went 8–4 for the season.

After his strong 1949 season, Martin was considered a candidate for the Little All-American team in his senior year. He put up solid numbers, and in early October was the leading passer among small college quarterbacks. By the end of the season, he had completed 68 passes for 1,106 yards and 6 touchdowns. He was not an All-American but did make the All-Conference team for the second year in a row. The Eagles went 7–2–1 and were co-champions of the Gulf Coast Conference. Against Tennessee-Chattanooga, Martin engineered a come-from-behind touchdown driving, scoring with a 12-yard pass in the closing seconds to win 19–14. And the following week against Houston, he again marshaled a 4th-quarter come-from-behind drive, throwing three straight complete passes, including the game-winning touchdown to put North Texas up 16–13.

Martin graduated in 1951 with, officially, 2,522 passing yards over his career, but that only includes the last two years because no official records exist before 1949. Including his reported yards from 1947 and 1948, he threw for at least 3,323 career passing yards, enough for the school record at the time and 8th all-time at North Texas. Using his official and reported numbers, he also graduated as the career leader in touchdown passes with at least 33, and now sits at 6th in school history. Both records lasted until the end of the 1960s.

In addition to football, Martin played tennis and basketball for North Texas. He was inducted into the North Texas Athletic Hall of Fame in 1989. He was also a candidate for the North Texas All-Century Football Team.

=== Pro football ===
Martin was drafted by the Redskins in the 23rd round of the 1951 NFL draft as the 268th pick, but it's unclear if he ever signed a contract or attended camp with them.

He was signed to play professional football with the Hamilton Tiger-Cats of the Interprovincial Rugby Football Union, a precursor to the Canadian Football League. He played in two games for the team in September of 1951, but he was cut on October 1, the league deadline for trimming foreign-born players on the roster down to seven. At one point, Coach Carl Voyles had considered Martin to be the team's #1 quarterback, but the need to limit Americans resulted in the cut. Nonetheless, Martin was paid for a full season of play.

=== Records ===
- **UT – Most interceptions, game (5), tied by Todd Dodge, Bret Stafford and Garrett Gilbert**
- UNT – Passing yards, career (3,323), surpassed by Steve Ramsey in 1969
- UNT – Touchdown passes, career (33), surpassed by Ramsey in 1969

Bold means active

== Coaching and refereeing ==
When his pro football career was over, Martin put his master's degree in education to use and became a high school coach and teacher. He was a basketball and football coach at Denison High School during the 1951–1952 school year and then moved to his alma mater in Denton to coach the same sports as well as tennis and golf. He replaced head coach Walt Parker, who was serving an 18-month stint in the Air Force, for a year as interim head coach in 1952 and then following Parker's return, spent a year as a line coach. When Parker resigned the following February, Martin was immediately promoted to head football coach. He was the head coach from 1954 to 1960 during which time Denton went 14–34–2.

Martin was an active football official. He worked at both the high school and college level officiating games in the Southwest Conference and the Missouri Valley Conference.

== Business and politics ==
In 1960, Martin started Martin-Eagle Oil Company which he grew from a single service station to a multimillion-dollar business with over 40 stations. On the same site as his original gas station he also owned Mean Green Grocery and a hamburger restaurant called Zeke's Drive-in, where Mean Joe Greene often ate while he was in college. He also owned real estate, a washateria and an apartment building.

After a few years in business, he went into politics. In 1967, he was elected to the Denton City Council and was promptly appointed Mayor by the council. As mayor he helped repair streets in Southeast Denton, get I-35 expanded west to Fort Worth and build a new City Hall. In 1968, he was the Republican nominee for the Texas House District 50 seat in the Texas legislature. His opponent was none other than Walt Parker, the man Martin had coached under in 1953 and replaced as head coach at Denton the following year. Martin lost that race, Parker served for 10 years, and in 1969, Martin stepped down as Mayor because the unpaid job was taking up too much of his time.

In 1976, he was involved in a high-profile fight with the University of North Texas over a lot he owned that they sought to condemn for a parking lot. The lot was once the Martin family home site and at the time hosted several of his businesses. Late in the year, they reached an amicable settlement for the land.

== Family and later life ==
Martin married his college sweetheart Bettye Lassiter in Houston in 1949. They had two children Steve and Gary. After his service in the Merchant Marines, he continued to serve in the Naval Reserves.

Martin was involved in much of the civic life in Denton. He founded Little League baseball in Denton, served as Director of the Chamber of Commerce, and organized a charity golf tournament for the UNT athletic department that bears his name, among others.

In November 2006, Martin was driving alone to a retired football coach's luncheon when he was involved in a car accident that claimed his life. He died in Fort Worth on November 27, 2006, and was buried in Denton.

== See also ==
- List of mayors of Denton, Texas
