= Todd Dodge =

American football player and coach (born 1963)

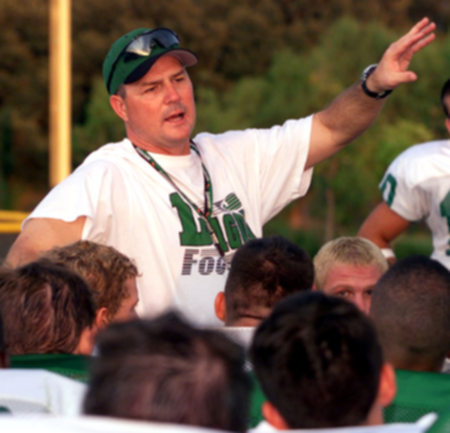
- Dodge speaks to a team at Southlake Carroll High School

Current position
- Title: Head coach
- Team: Lovejoy HS (TX)
- Record: 25-11

Biographical details
- Born: July 21, 1963 (age 63); Port Arthur, Texas, U.S.

Playing career
- 1982–1985: Texas
- Position: Quarterback

Coaching career (HC unless noted)
- 1987: Rockwall HS (TX) (QB/WR)
- 1988–1991: McKinney HS (TX) (OC)
- 1992–1993: North Texas (QB/WR)
- 1994–1995: C. H. Yoe HS (TX)
- 1996–1997: Newman Smith HS (TX)
- 1998–1999: Fossil Ridge HS (TX)
- 2000–2006: Carroll HS (TX)
- 2007–2010: North Texas
- 2011: Pittsburgh (QB)
- 2012–2013: Marble Falls HS (TX)
- 2014–2021: Westlake HS (TX)
- 2024–present: Lovejoy HS (TX)

Head coaching record
- Overall: 6–37 (college); 134–48 (high school)

Accomplishments and honors

Championships
- 4 Texas 5A state (2002, 2004–2006); 3 Texas 6A state (2019–2021)

Awards
- 2× High School Coach of the Year (Schutt Sports 2003, USA Today 2004); 2005 Southwest Region HS Coach of the Year (PrepNation.com); 2005 Inductee Texas High School Football Hall of Fame; 2015 Lone Star Gridiron 6A Coach of the Year (Lone Star Gridiron)

Todd Russell Dodge (born July 21, 1963) is an American football coach and former player, and current head coach at Lovejoy High School in Lucas, Texas. After graduating from the University of Texas at Austin where he played quarterback for the Longhorns, Dodge went into coaching, primarily at the high school level. At Southlake Carroll he was head coach of four 5A state championship teams in a seven-year span. He moved on to the college level as head coach of the University of North Texas football team, but he was released after acquiring a 6–37 record. After coaching the quarterbacks at the University of Pittsburgh for the 2011 season, he returned to high school coaching in 2012.

== Early life ==
Dodge played quarterback at Thomas Jefferson High School in Port Arthur, Texas, under coach Ronnie Thompson where he set several state records. As a senior in 1980, Dodge set the record for most passing yards in a season and became the first quarterback in Texas high school football history to pass for more than 3,000 yards in a season (3,135 yards). That same season, he led Jefferson High to the 1980 Class 4A state championship game against Permian High School of Odessa, Texas. He also set Texas high school records for most career completions (382) and most completions in a season (221); while finishing his career with the second most career passing yards behind Gary Kubiak.

== College career ==
Dodge went on to play quarterback at the University of Texas at Austin under coach Fred Akers. From 1982 to 1983, Dodge was a backup quarterback, though he did get his first start as a freshman in the 1982 Sun Bowl when Robert Brewer broke his hand 5 days before the game. In that game the #8 Longhorns were upset by North Carolina 26–10, in the snow, with Dodge going 6-22 for just 50 yards.

In 1983, Dodge was named the starter for the opening game, but a shoulder injury in the final preseason scrimmage on Sep 9, sidelined him for a month and he didn't reclaim the starting role until early November. In late October he twice came in off the bench to replace starter Rob Moerschell and rally the Longhorns to wins. He came in late to throw the go-ahead touchdown pass in the 15–12 win over SMU, and early the following week to lead the Longhorns to a 20–3 win over Texas Tech. The next week he got his first start of the season in a 9-3 lackluster win over Houston. But after struggling in the TCU game the next week and being replaced by Moerschell, he didn't play the remainder of the year. Despite the quarterback troubles that resulted in rotating starters, the Longhorns went undefeated during the regular season and, but for a disappointing loss to Georgia in the Cotton Bowl, would have won the national championship.

The Longhorns entered the 1984 season ranked #4 with Dodge again as the starter. The team started with back-to-back wins over ranked opponents, #11 Auburn and #4 Penn State. Texas rose to a #1 ranking, which it lost after a controversial 15–15 tie with #3 Oklahoma, but went on to win 3 more games, including a win over #14 SMU to start the season 6–0–1. But the title run was ended during a 29–15 loss to Houston in which Dodge threw 0 completions in his first 13 passes (but 4 of his 5 record interceptions) and was benched for Bret Stafford. Dodge led the team to a win over #12 TCU the next week, but lost again to Baylor in the following game—while setting school records for single season passing yards and completions. The season finished with two more losses, to Texas A&M when Dodge was benched for Stafford, and to Iowa in the 1984 Freedom Bowl when the Longhorns gave up 55 points, the most since 1904.

Dodge and Stafford started the 1985 season in the middle of a heated quarterback battle, which Stafford won. After splitting time in the first three games, Dodge got a chance to retake the quarterback position when Stafford was pulled six plays into the Oklahoma game, but Dodge threw 2 interceptions and could only muster 53 yards allowing Stafford to retain the starting role the next week against Arkansas. Dodge would not see significant playing time again until the final game of the regular season when he came off the bench versus Texas A&M to score the Longhorns only touchdown that day.

Dodge finished with a career record of 9-5-1 and several passing records. He still ranks ninth on the UT all-time passing list with 2,791 yards and stands ninth in TD passes with 18. His 359 passing yards in Texas' 44–16 win over Rice in 1985 stood as the Longhorn single-game record for 13 years before James Brown broke it with a 397-yard passing day against Texas Tech in 1997. Dodge's passing effort currently ranks fourth on the UT single-game chart, behind Major Applewhite, Colt McCoy, and Brown. His 96-yard touchdown pass to Donovan Pitts in the 1985 Rice game is still tied for the second longest in school history.

=== Records ===
- Texas High School Record- Most passing yards, season (3,135), surpassed by Wilbur Odom in 1986
- UT - Passing Yards, Game (359); surpassed by James Brown in 1997
- UT - Passing Yards, Season (1,599), surpassed by Bret Stafford in 1986
- UT - Highest Average Gain per completion, game (32.6)
- UT - Passes intercepted, Game (5) tied with Zeke Martin, Stafford, Garrett Gilbert
- UT - Passes intercepted, Season (19)
- UT - Longest Pass Play (96 yards), pass to Donovon Pitts; surpassed by Major Applewhite in 1998
- UT - Longest Scoring Play (96 yards), pass to Donovon Pitts; surpassed by Major Applewhite in 1998

Italic means active

== High school coaching career ==
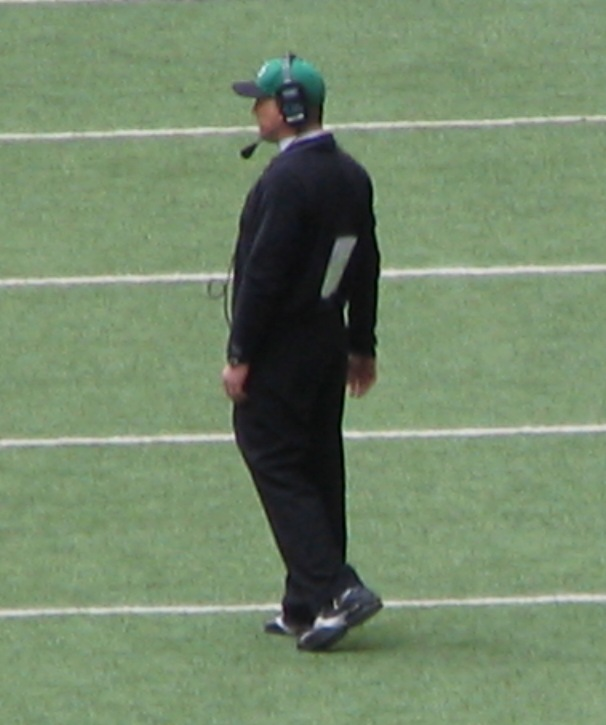
Todd Dodge on the field while coaching at Carroll High School

I was very blessed to know when I was 17 years old that I wanted to go into coaching. And that I had the opportunity to play at the University of Texas, where I don't know that you can have a better training ground to be a coach.

— Todd Dodge

In the spring of 1987, Dodge was working as a city meter service representative and while on the job, suffered 2nd and 3rd degree burns as the result of an electrical accident.

Later, Dodge pursued a coaching career at the high school level. His first stop was at Rockwall in 1987, where he coached the quarterbacks and wide receivers. That year, the team made an appearance at the 4A state championship game against West Orange–Stark. Dodge then became offensive coordinator at McKinney High School under head coach Ron Poe. By 1991, Poe yielded to Dodge's persuasion and agreed to try the spread offense. Dodge came up with a hybrid between the Houston's run and shoot offense, the Miami's three- and five-step drops, and a zone running game. McKinney reached the 4A Regionals in 1991.

After a two-year stint as an assistant coach at North Texas, Dodge became a head coach, first at C.H. Yoe High School in Cameron, then at Carrollton Newman-Smith and Keller Fossil Ridge high schools.

In 2000, Dodge became head coach at Southlake Carroll, where he had his greatest success. Southlake Carroll had won 3A state championships in 1988, 1992 and 1993, but had since then moved on to 5A, the largest classification in the state. Dodge coached his first state championship team in 2002, when the school won the 5A (Division II) state championship with a 45–14 victory over Smithson Valley High School. A year later, he led them back to the championship game where they lost by one point to Katy High School. Dodge's Southlake Carroll then proceeded to win three straight championships from 2004 to 2007, tying the state record set by Abilene High School's in the 1950s. In addition, each of those teams was recognized as mythical national champions by either USA Today (2004, '06) or National Prep Poll (2004, '05). Schutt Sports named Dodge "National Coach of the Year" in 2004 and by USA Today in 2005. After the 2006 season, Dodge left Southlake Carroll to coach at the University of North Texas. During his seven seasons at Southlake Carroll, Dodge's teams had a 98–11 record overall.

== College coaching career ==
=== North Texas ===
The North Texas Mean Green hired Dodge on December 12, 2006, as the new head football coach of the football team, replacing former coach Darrell Dickey, who was fired on November 8 after going 2–9 in 2005 and 3–9 in 2006.

=== 2007 ===
During his first season as head coach, UNT went 2–10. Dodge's spread offense averaged 408.4 total yards and 24.8 points per game while giving up 39 sacks. Dodge brought most of his original college coaching staff from the high school ranks, and the team struggled to compete against non-conference and Sun Belt foes. UNT's defensive squad, directed by Ron Mendoza, gave up an FBS-worst 45.1 points per game. Soon after the season ended, Dodge dismissed Mendoza.

=== 2008 ===
For the 2008 season, Dodge hired Gary DeLoach as the team's new defensive coordinator. Deloach had a terrific run as UNT's secondary coach from 1998 to 2000 and was a fan favorite for his stellar work as defensive coordinator from 2000 to 2002. Even with dramatically improved coaching, the Mean Green defense lacked experienced, developed talent. The defense allowed 47.6 points per game in 2008, the worst number at the FBS level that year. The offense also regressed, averaging only 20.0 points per game and allowing 25 sacks. The team's special teams units were among the worst in the country in most categories. That year, quarterback Riley Dodge, Todd Dodge's son, joined the team. The team finished with a dismal 1–11 record, its only win over FBS transitional Western Kentucky.

=== 2009 ===
Dodge focused heavily on upgrading the team's defensive talent with several good recruits from the junior college ranks in 2009. The defense improved, giving up an average of 36.4 PPG, including 28.8 PPG in the last four games when the new talent jelled. Although the offensive line held opposing teams to 12 sacks all season, the offense had 21 fumbles and 17 interceptions during the season. The kicking game suffered from several blocked field goals, and the team finished the 2009 season with a 2–10 record.

=== 2010 ===
UNT opted to retain Todd Dodge for the 2010 season. It was understood that Dodge had to produce a winning season to keep his job.

On October 20, 2010, UNT athletics director Rick Villarreal fired Dodge. Dodge had compiled a 6–37 record.

During his tenure, UNT was consistently rated in the bottom ten by ESPN.

Offensive coordinator Mike Canales took over as interim head coach.

Going into the 2013 season, Athlon Sports rated Todd Dodge as the seventh worst college football tenure in the BCS era.

=== Pittsburgh ===
Dodge was named the quarterbacks coach at the University of Pittsburgh on January 18, 2011. He held the position for one season before returning to coach high school football in Texas.

== Return to high school coaching ==
In January 2012, Pittsburgh's head football coach Todd Graham left to become the head coach at Arizona State. Dodge was not retained by Pitt after the coaching change, and decided to move back to the Texas high school coaching ranks, taking over as head coach at Marble Falls High School.

In 2014, Dodge left Marble Falls to take over the program at football powerhouse Austin Westlake High School in Eanes Independent School District. Dodge took the Westlake Chapparrals to the State Championship game in 2015 but lost to Galena Park North Shore 21–14 in overtime. He took the Lone Star Gridiron Class 6A Coach of the Year honors for the season. He went on to win State Championships in the 6A division in the 2019, 2020 and 2021 seasons, becoming the first Texas high school football coach to win 3-straight championships with 2 different schools. He announced after the 2020 season that he will be retiring from high school football coaching after the 2021 season.

The 2020 UIL 6A Division 1 state championship game marked the end of a strange season already marred by the COVID-19 pandemic. Things got even weirder with Westlake matched against Southlake Carroll, one of Dodge's previous teams, coached by his son, Riley Dodge. Westlake prevailed, 52–34, in the father-son coaching matchup, finishing the season as state champs at 14–0.

In January 2024, Dodge came out of retirement to take the head coaching job at Lovejoy High School in Lucas, Texas.

In 2025, he was inducted into the Texas Sports Hall of Fame.

== Personal life ==
Dodge is married to Elizabeth Neptune, daughter of Ebbie Neptune, longtime athletic director and football coach at Westlake High School of Austin, Texas. The couple have a son, Riley Dodge, who played wide receiver and quarterback at North Texas, and a daughter, Molly.

In 1985, while finishing up his degree at Texas, Dodge was badly injured in a fire. While working as an electric meter technician for the city of Austin, his equipment overloaded and exploded. The fire left 2nd and 3rd degree burns on his hands, arms and face and nearly cost him some of his fingers.

== Head coaching record ==
=== High school ===
Year	Team	Overall	Conference	Standing	Bowl/playoffs
C.H. Yoe High School () (1994–1995)
1994	Cameron Yoe	3–7			
1995	Cameron Yoe	5–5			
Cameron Yoe:		8–12			
Newman Smith High School () (1996–1997)
1996	Carrollton Newman Smith	4–6			
1997	Carrollton Newman Smith	5–5			
Carrollton Newman Smith:		9–11			
Fossil Ridge High School () (1998–1999)
1998	Keller Fossil Ridge	2–7			
1999	Keller Fossil Ridge	5–5			
Keller Fossil Ridge:		7–12			
Southlake Carroll High School () (2000–2006)
2000	Southlake Carroll	9–5			
2001	Southlake Carroll	10–5			
2002	Southlake Carroll	16–0			W 5A Division II State Championship
2003	Southlake Carroll	15–1			L 5A Division II State Championship
2004	Southlake Carroll	16–0			W 5A Division II State Championship
2005	Southlake Carroll	16–0			W 5A Division II State Championship
2006	Southlake Carroll	16–0			W 5A Division II State Championship
Southlake Carroll:		98–11			
Marble Falls High School () (2012–2013)
2012	Marble Falls	4–6			
2013	Marble Falls	4–6			
Marble Falls:		8–12			
Austin Westlake High School () (2014–2021)
2014	Austin Westlake	7–4			
2015	Austin Westlake	14–2			L 6A Division I State Championship
2016	Austin Westlake	11–3			L 6A Division I State Quarterfinals
2017	Austin Westlake	14–1			L 6A Division II State Semifinals
2018	Austin Westlake	13–2			L 6A Division II State Semifinals
2019	Austin Westlake	15–1			W 6A Division II State Championship
2020	Austin Westlake	14–0			W 6A Division I State Championship
2021	Austin Westlake	16–0			W 6A Division II State Championship
Austin Westlake:		104–13			
Lovejoy High School () (2024–present)
2024	Lovejoy	10–4			L 5A Division II State Quarterfinals
2025	Lovejoy	6–5			
Lovejoy:		16–9			
Total:		250–80			
National championship Conference title Conference division title or championship game berth

=== College ===
Year	Team	Overall	Conference	Standing	Bowl/playoffs
North Texas Mean Green (Sun Belt Conference) (2007–2010)
2007	North Texas	2–10	1–6	7th	
2008	North Texas	1–11	0–7	8th	
2009	North Texas	2–10	1–7	8th	
2010	North Texas	1–6 (Note: Dodge was fired after the first seven games of the 2010 season. Mike Canales was appointed interim head coach and led the team for the final five games of the season. North Texas finished the year with an overall record of 3–9 and a mark of 3–5 in conference play, tying for sixth place in the Sun Belt Conference.)	1–3	8th	
North Texas:		6–37	3–23		
Total:		6–37			
