= 2010 North Texas Mean Green football team =

American college football season

2010 North Texas Mean Green football
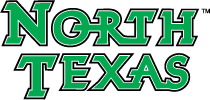
- Conference: Sun Belt Conference
- Record: 3–9 (3–5 Sun Belt)
- Head coach: Todd Dodge (4th season; first 7 games); Mike Canales (interim, final 5 games)
- Offensive coordinator: Mike Canales (1st season)
- Offensive scheme: Spread option
- Defensive coordinator: Gary DeLoach (6th overall season)
- Base defense: 4–3
- Home stadium: Fouts Field

2010 Sun Belt Conference football standings
	Conf.			Overall
Team	W		L	W		L
Troy +	6	–	2	8	–	5
FIU +	6	–	2	7	–	6
Middle Tennessee	5	–	3	6	–	7
Louisiana–Monroe	4	–	4	5	–	7
Arkansas State	4	–	4	4	–	8
Florida Atlantic	3	–	5	4	–	8
Louisiana–Lafayette	3	–	5	3	–	9
North Texas	3	–	5	3	–	9
Western Kentucky	2	–	6	2	–	10
+ – Conference co-champions

The 2010 North Texas Mean Green football team represented the University of North Texas as a member of the Sun Belt Conference during the 2010 NCAA Division I FBS football season. The Mean Green began the season under fourth-head coach Todd Dodge, who was fired after the team started the season with a 1–6 record. Offensive coordinator Mike Canales was appointed interim head coach and led the team for the final five games of the season. North Texas finished the year with an overall record of 3–9 and a conference mark of 3–5, placing in a three-way tie for sixth in the Sun Belt. The Mean Green played home games on campus, at Fouts Field in Denton, Texas. This was the team final season at Fouts Field as the team moved to the newly-opened Apogee Stadium in 2011.

Dodge finished his three-and-a-half-year tenure at North Texas with a record of 6–36. Following the season, former Iowa State University head coach and University of Florida defensive coach Dan McCarney was hired the Mean Green's new head coach.

== Schedule ==
Date	Time	Opponent	Site	TV	Result	Attendance
September 4	2:30 pm	at Clemson*	Memorial Stadium; Clemson, SC	ESPNU	L 10–35	77,342
September 11	6:00 pm	Rice*	Fouts Field; Denton, TX		L 31–32	23,743
September 18	11:00 am	at Army*	Michie Stadium; West Point, NY	CBSCS	L 0–24	23,647
September 25	6:00 pm	at Florida Atlantic	Lockhart Stadium; Ft. Lauderdale, FL		W 21–17	15,143
October 2	6:30 pm	Louisiana–Lafayette	Fouts Field; Denton, TX	CST, CSS	L 27–28	17,015
October 9	6:00 pm	Arkansas State	Fouts Field; Denton, TX		L 19–24	14,589
October 16	6:30 pm	FIU^{†}	Fouts Field; Denton, TX	CST, CSS	L 10–34	14,718
October 30	2:00 pm	at Western Kentucky	Houchens Industries–L. T. Smith Stadium; Bowling Green, KY		W 33–6	14,373
November 6	6:00 pm	Troy	Fouts Field; Denton, TX		L 35–41	14,289
November 13	3:30 pm	at Middle Tennessee	Johnny "Red" Floyd Stadium; Murfreesboro, TN	ESPN3	W 23–17	14,227
November 20	2:30 pm	at Louisiana–Monroe	Malone Stadium; Monroe, LA		L 37–49	8,905
November 27	3:00 pm	Kansas State*	Fouts Field; Denton, TX	ESPN3	L 41–49	21,952
*Non-conference game; ^{†}Homecoming; All times are in Central time
