= 2007 North Texas Mean Green football team =

American college football season

2007 North Texas Mean Green football
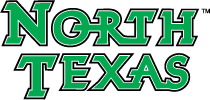
- Conference: Sun Belt Conference
- Record: 2–10 (1–6 Sun Belt)
- Head coach: Todd Dodge (1st season)
- Offensive coordinator: Todd Ford (1st season)
- Offensive scheme: Spread option
- Defensive coordinator: Ron Mendoza (1st season)
- Base defense: 4–3
- Home stadium: Fouts Field

2007 Sun Belt Conference football standings
	Conf.			Overall
Team	W		L	W		L
Florida Atlantic +	6	–	1	8	–	5
Troy +	6	–	1	8	–	4
Middle Tennessee	4	–	3	5	–	7
Louisiana–Monroe	4	–	3	6	–	6
Arkansas State	3	–	4	5	–	7
Louisiana–Lafayette	3	–	4	3	–	9
FIU	1	–	6	1	–	11
North Texas	1	–	6	2	–	10
+ – Conference co-champions

The 2007 North Texas Mean Green football team represented the University of North Texas as a member of the Sun Belt Conference during the 2007 NCAA Division I FBS football season. Led first-year head coach, the Mean Green compiled an overall record of 2–10 with a mark 1–6 in conference play, tying for seventh place the bottom of the Sun Belt standings. The team played home games at the Fouts Field in Denton, Texas.

== Schedule ==
Date	Time	Opponent	Site	TV	Result	Attendance	Source
September 1	6:00 pm	at No. 8 Oklahoma*	Gaylord Family Oklahoma Memorial Stadium; Norman, OK	FSN	L 10–79	84,472	
September 8	7:00 pm	at SMU*	Gerald J. Ford Stadium; University Park, TX (Safeway Bowl)		L 31–45	20,517	
September 22	6:00 pm	Florida Atlantic	Fouts Field; Denton, TX		L 20–30	20,479	
September 29	6:00 pm	at Arkansas*	Donald W. Reynolds Razorback Stadium; Fayetteville, AR		L 7–66	66,343	
October 6	6:00 pm	at Louisiana–Lafayette	Cajun Field; Lafayette, LA	ESPN Plus	L 29–38	9,464	
October 13	6:00 pm	Louisiana–Monroe	Fouts Field; Denton, TX	ESPN Plus	W 31–21	18,973	
October 20	2:30 pm	at Troy	Movie Gallery Stadium; Troy, AL	SS	L 7–45	23,887	
October 27	6:00 pm	Middle Tennessee^{†}	Fouts Field; Denton, TX		L 28–48	18,181	
November 10	3:00 pm	Navy*	Fouts Field; Denton, TX		L 62–74	26,012	
November 15	6:00 pm	at Arkansas State	ASU Stadium; Jonesboro, AR	ESPN Plus	L 27–31	11,736	
November 24	3:00 pm	Western Kentucky*	Fouts Field; Denton, TX		W 27–26	5,027	
December 1	6:00 pm	at FIU	Miami Orange Bowl; Miami, FL		L 19–38	10,129	
*Non-conference game; ^{†}Homecoming; Rankings from AP Poll released prior to the game; All times are in Central time

== Preseason ==
=== Coaching hires ===
Todd Dodge was hired as head coach replacing Darrell Dickey, who was fired after going 3–9 in 2006. Dodge was regarded as one of the nation’s most successful high school football coaches amassing a 98–11 record overall at Carroll High School in Southlake, Texas. He was named National Coach of the Year by Schutt Sports in 2004 and by USA Today in 2005. His Southlake program produced five consecutive offensive players of the year in Texas. Dodge is also regarded by many FBS coaches as one of the nation's premiere offensive minds in developing a unique and effective scheme in his variation of the spread offense, in the much the same vein as Steve Spurrier and Mouse Davis. While at Southlake, Dodge helped the University of Missouri to implement his scheme.

After being named as head coach, Dodge announced in early January the hiring of nine new assistant coaches. The new staff's combined resumes included 26 bowl game appearances, 14 bowl victories, 18 high school state titles, a Super Bowl title and a Bowl Championship Series (BCS) national title. New defensive coordinator Ron Mendoza, new offensive coordinator Todd Ford, and new special teams Robert Drake all came with Dodge from Carroll High School, where they coached the Dragons to five state titles. After a coaching in the National Football League (NFL) with the Pittsburgh Steelers and at University of Houston, Butch LaCroix, former North Texas assistant from 1987 to 1993, rejoined the Mean Green staff for a second stint as cornerbacks coach. After four seasons at the University of Tulsa, Spencer Leftwich returned as offensive line coach, a position he held at North Texas from 1994 to 2002. Former North Texas leading receiver, new receivers coach Clayton George, also served under Dodge until becoming head coach at Hillcrest High School. 2003 NCAA Division I-A assistant coach of the year, Chuck Petersen was hired as safeties coach after spending 17 years with at the United States Air Force Academy. Former Texas Longhorns and St. Louis Rams player and later Texas graduate assistant, Derek Lewis, was appointed defensive ends coach. After spending the previous two seasons at Louisiana Tech, Shelton Gandy was hired as running backs coach.

=== Stadium improvements ===
Prior to the first home game, Fouts Field received several improvements. With paint donated by local Pittsburgh Paints, the student spirit organization, Talons, repainted the entire stadium. Other changes included renovated bathrooms, signage, asphalt in and around the entry gates. This is the largest improvement to Fouts since replacement of the field's Astroturf prior to the 2005 season.

=== Uniform changes ===
On August 4, 2007, North Texas unveiled changes to their uniforms during the Kickoff Cookout at the Mean Green Athletic Center. For away games, instead of all green jerseys, the team wore white shirts with white pants. Home games featured the university's new kelly green on top and the same white pants. The numbers and letters were green for away games and white for home with a black outline. The most notable change was the reintroduction of a white helmet not worn since Joe Greene played for North Texas in the late 1960s.

== Game summaries ==
=== At No. 8 Oklahoma ===
	1	2	3	4	Total
Mean Green	0	0	3	7	10
No. 8 Sooners	21	28	14	16	79

Statistics	UNT	OKLA
First downs	13	26
Total yards	247	668
Rushing yards	15	265
Passing yards	232	403
Turnovers	3	2
Time of possession	27:58	32:02

Team	Category	Player	Statistics
North Texas	Passing	Giovanni Vizza	4/11, 124 yards, TD, 2 INT
North Texas	Rushing	Micah Mosley	5 rushes, 15 yards
North Texas	Receiving	Casey Fitzgerald	7 receptions, 126 yards, TD
Oklahoma	Passing	Sam Bradford	21/23, 363 yards, 3 TD
Oklahoma	Rushing	DeMarco Murray	17 rushes, 87 yards, 5 TD
Oklahoma	Receiving	Juaquin Iglesias	7 receptions, 128 yards

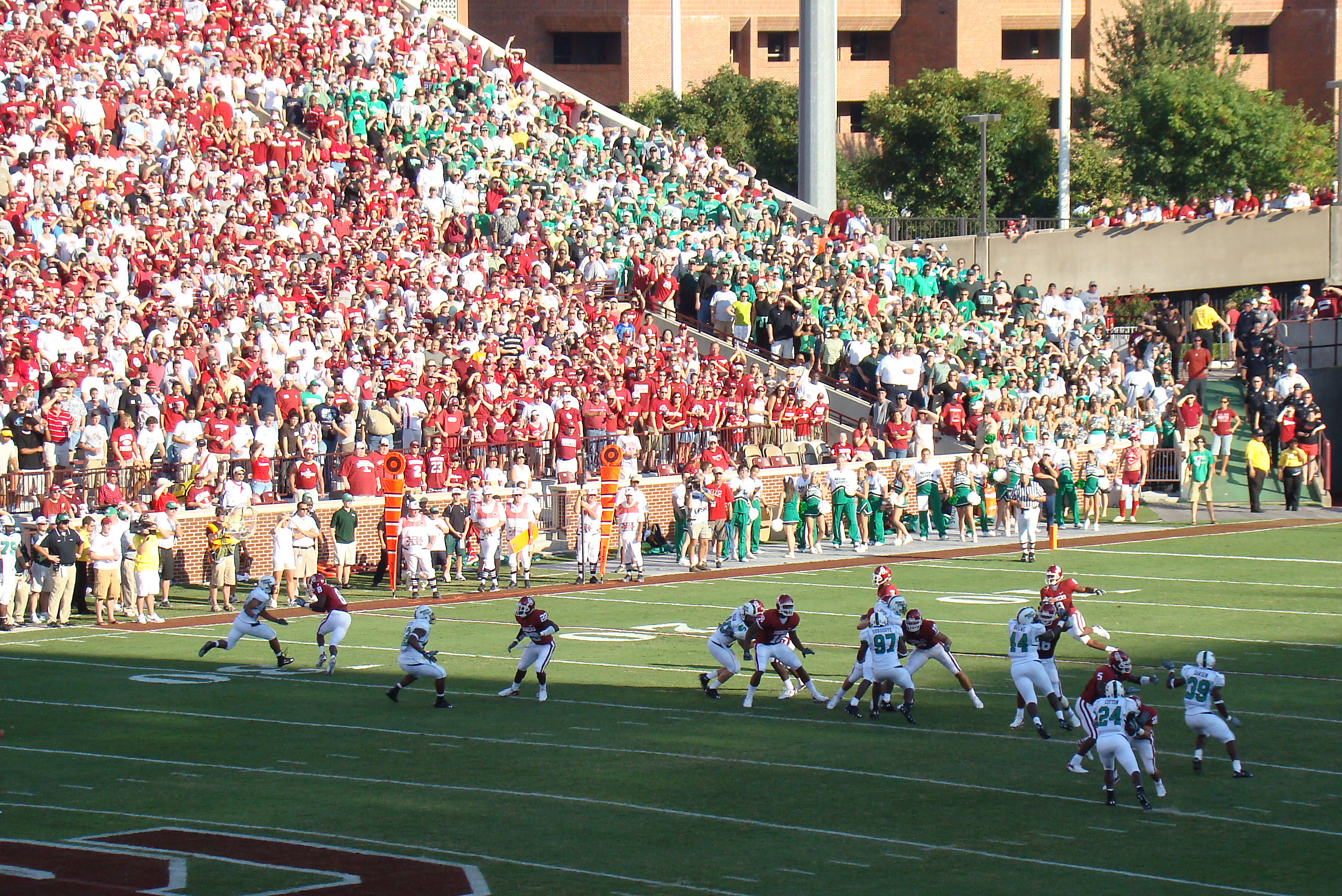
The Mean Green defense against the Sooners with both teams' fans looking on

The Mean Green traveled to Norman, Oklahoma, for the season opener against the Oklahoma Sooners. Within :32 seconds of the first quarter, the Sooners scored on their opening drive. The Sooners put up 49 unanswered points until North Texas kicker Thomas Moreland completed the first field goal of the season late in the third quarter. After the Sooners racked up two more touchdowns, freshman (QB) Giovanni Vizza threw the Mean Green's only touchdown of the game to wide receiver (WR) Casey Fitzgerald early in the fourth quarter.

The game ended with a final score of 79–10. The Mean Green finished with 15 yards rushing and 232 yards passing. Both starting quarterback junior Daniel Meager and freshman Giovanni Vizza saw game time with Meager being replaced by Vizza during the third quarter. Micah Mosley (RB) led the Mean Green in rushing 5 carries and 15 yards. Contradicting the final score, Oklahoma head coach Bob Stoops admitted being worried about running up the score criticizing the Mean Green's no huddle offense. Coach Dodge handled the loss well and was quoted he held no ill-feelings towards to Sooners for the lopsided win.

North Texas set a new record of most points given up in a single game. It also marked the second-largest margin of loss in a single game for the Mean Green.

=== At SMU ===
	1	2	3	4	Total
Mean Green	14	0	3	14	31
Mustangs	3	14	14	14	45

Statistics	UNT	SMU
First downs	31	28
Total yards	613	534
Rushing yards	12	181
Passing yards	601	353
Turnovers	4	2
Time of possession	29:00	31:00

Team	Category	Player	Statistics
North Texas	Passing	Daniel Meager	46/64, 601 yards, 3 TD, 3 INT
North Texas	Rushing	Micah Mosley	12 rushes, 39 yards, TD
North Texas	Receiving	Casey Fitzgerald	18 receptions, 327 yards, 3 TD
SMU	Passing	Justin Willis	30/42, 353 yards, 2 TD, INT
SMU	Rushing	Justin Willis	10 rushes, 82 yards
SMU	Receiving	Devin Lowery	7 receptions, 160 yards

=== Florida Atlantic ===
	1	2	3	4	Total
Owls	3	7	3	17	30
Mean Green	7	10	3	0	20

Statistics	FAU	UNT
First downs	17	29
Total yards	406	466
Rushing yards	84	165
Passing yards	322	301
Turnovers	0	3
Time of possession	27:47	32:13

Team	Category	Player	Statistics
Florida Atlantic	Passing	Rusty Smith	21/45, 322 yards, TD
Florida Atlantic	Rushing	Dilvory Edgecomb	5 rushes, 29 yards, TD
Florida Atlantic	Receiving	Cortez Gent	4 receptions, 96 yards, TD
North Texas	Passing	Daniel Meager	38/61, 301 yards, TD, 3 INT
North Texas	Rushing	Jamario Thomas	14 rushes, 117 yards, TD
North Texas	Receiving	Corey Fitzgerald	10 receptions, 89 yards

=== At Arkansas ===
	1	2	3	4	Total
Mean Green	0	7	0	0	7
Razorbacks	24	21	7	14	66

Statistics	UNT	ARK
First downs	18	31
Total yards	329	713
Rushing yards	140	446
Passing yards	189	267
Turnovers	2	2
Time of possession	29:43	30:17

Team	Category	Player	Statistics
North Texas	Passing	Giovanni Vizza	8/26, 118 yards, INT
North Texas	Rushing	Micah Mosley	11 rushes, 68 yards
North Texas	Receiving	Brandon Jackson	6 receptions, 84 yards
Arkansas	Passing	Casey Dick	12/21, 210 yards, 3 TD
Arkansas	Rushing	Darren McFadden	19 rushes, 138 yards, 2 TD
Arkansas	Receiving	Robert Johnson	4 receptions, 71 yards, TD

=== At Louisiana–Lafayette ===
	1	2	3	4	Total
Mean Green	0	12	7	10	29
Ragin' Cajuns	7	7	14	10	38

Statistics	UNT	ULL
First downs	25	14
Total yards	527	414
Rushing yards	144	300
Passing yards	383	114
Turnovers	4	2
Time of possession	40:36	19:24

Team	Category	Player	Statistics
North Texas	Passing	Giovanni Vizza	35/57, 383 yards, 3 TD, 3 INT
North Texas	Rushing	Jamario Thomas	13 rushes, 60 yards
North Texas	Receiving	Corey Fitzgerald	14 receptions, 131 yards, 2 TD
Louisiana–Lafayette	Passing	Mic Desormeaux	10/20, 114 yards, 2 TD
Louisiana–Lafayette	Rushing	Mic Desormeaux	18 rushes, 150 yards, 2 TD
Louisiana–Lafayette	Receiving	Derrick Smith	4 receptions, 80 yards, TD

=== Louisiana–Monroe ===
	1	2	3	4	Total
Warhawks	0	0	7	14	21
Mean Green	0	21	3	7	31

Statistics	ULM	UNT
First downs	22	17
Total yards	421	373
Rushing yards	130	171
Passing yards	291	202
Turnovers	3	2
Time of possession	29:26	30:34

Team	Category	Player	Statistics
Louisiana–Monroe	Passing	Trey Revell	14/29, 196 yards, 3 TD, INT
Louisiana–Monroe	Rushing	Calvin Dawson	18 rushes, 65 yards
Louisiana–Monroe	Receiving	Frank Goodin	6 receptions, 79 yards, TD
North Texas	Passing	Giovanni Vizza	16/30, 202 yards, TD, INT
North Texas	Rushing	Micah Mosley	11 rushes, 73 yards, TD
North Texas	Receiving	Corey Fitzgerald	6 receptions, 118 yards, TD

=== At Troy ===
	1	2	3	4	Total
Mean Green	0	0	7	0	7
Trojans	21	7	7	10	45

Statistics	UNT	TROY
First downs	13	21
Total yards	205	493
Rushing yards	26	137
Passing yards	179	356
Turnovers	2	7
Time of possession	33:54	26:06

Team	Category	Player	Statistics
North Texas	Passing	Giovanni Vizza	22/38, 172 yards, TD, INT
North Texas	Rushing	Jamario Thomas	8 rushes, 12 yards
North Texas	Receiving	Brandon Jackson	9 receptions, 77 yard
Troy	Passing	Omar Haugabook	25/37, 287 yards, 3 TD, 4 INT
Troy	Rushing	Omar Haugabook	12 rushes, 42 yards
Troy	Receiving	Gary Banks	6 receptions, 95 yards, TD

=== Middle Tennessee ===
	1	2	3	4	Total
Blue Raiders	10	20	7	11	48
Mean Green	7	14	7	0	28

Statistics	MTSU	UNT
First downs	21	21
Total yards	335	383
Rushing yards	132	87
Passing yards	203	296
Turnovers	0	5
Time of possession	36:08	23:52

Team	Category	Player	Statistics
Middle Tennessee	Passing	Dwight Dasher	16/21, 159 yards, 2 TD
Middle Tennessee	Rushing	DeMarco McNair	11 rushes, 62 yards, 2 TD
Middle Tennessee	Receiving	Taron Henry	6 receptions, 103 yards, TD
North Texas	Passing	Giovanni Vizza	25/45, 296 yards, 2 TD, 4 INT
North Texas	Rushing	Jamario Thomas	10 rushes, 89 yards, TD
North Texas	Receiving	Sam Dibrell	8 receptions, 121 yards, TD

=== Navy ===
	1	2	3	4	Total
Midshipmen	10	35	20	9	74
Mean Green	21	28	7	6	62

Statistics	NAVY	UNT
First downs	31	29
Total yards	680	635
Rushing yards	572	157
Passing yards	108	478
Turnovers	1	2
Time of possession	26:31	33:29

Team	Category	Player	Statistics
Navy	Passing	Kaipo-NoaKaheaku-Enhada	4/5, 108 yards, TD
Navy	Rushing	Shun White	7 rushes, 131 yards, TD
Navy	Receiving	Tyree Barnes	3 receptions, 61 yards, TD
North Texas	Passing	Giovanni Vizza	40/50, 478 yards, 8 TD, 2 INT
North Texas	Rushing	Giovanni Vizza	13 rushes, 93 yards
North Texas	Receiving	Casey Fitzgerald	13 receptions, 134 yards, 5 TD

With 136 total points, the game set the NCAA Division I-FBS record for most total points scored in a regulation-length game. The previous record for college football's top division (previously called Division I-A) was 133 points during San Jose State's 70 63 win over Rice in 2004. In addition to the Division I-FBS total points record set by Navy vs. North Texas, the 94 first-half points and the 63 combined points in the second quarter, both set college records.

Navy came into the game with the best rushing offense, statistically, of any team in the nation. They set a school record by running for 572 yards with eight rushing touchdowns in the game. The Midshipmen tied another school record by scoring at least 30 points for the eighth consecutive game.

Todd Dodge said, "I have never been a part of a game quite like this. I knew that we would have to score on nearly every possession and maybe steal a possession or two with turnovers."

=== At Arkansas State ===
	1	2	3	4	Total
Mean Green	7	14	0	6	27
Indians	0	7	10	14	31

Statistics	UNT	ARST
First downs	23	29
Total yards	381	480
Rushing yards	221	167
Passing yards	160	313
Turnovers	2	2
Time of possession	34:11	25:49

Team	Category	Player	Statistics
North Texas	Passing	Giovanni Vizza	22/30, 160 yards, INT
North Texas	Rushing	Giovanni Vizza	17 rushes, 79 yards
North Texas	Receiving	corey Fitzgerald	11 receptions, 58 yards
Arkansas State	Passing	Corey Leonard	25/50, 305 yards, 2 TD, 2 INT
Arkansas State	Rushing	Reggie Arnold	11 rushes, 75 yards, TD
Arkansas State	Receiving	Levi Dejohnette	9 receptions, 108 yards

=== Western Kentucky ===
	1	2	3	4	Total
Hilltoppers	7	13	3	3	26
Mean Green	0	7	14	6	27

Statistics	WKU	UNT
First downs	21	23
Total yards	349	397
Rushing yards	226	195
Passing yards	123	202
Turnovers	2	3
Time of possession	31:16	28:44

Team	Category	Player	Statistics
Western Kentucky	Passing	David Wolke	14/20, 129 yards
Western Kentucky	Rushing	Tyrell Hayden	19 rushes, 97 yards, TD
Western Kentucky	Receiving	Curtis Hamilton	7 receptions, 73 yards
North Texas	Passing	Giovanni Vizza	20/42, 202 yards, 3 INT
North Texas	Rushing	Jamario Thomas	16 rushes, 147 yards, 3 TD
North Texas	Receiving	Corey Fitzgerald	8 receptions, 80 yards

=== At FIU ===
	1	2	3	4	Total
Mean Green	6	6	7	0	19
Golden Panthers	0	21	14	3	38

Statistics	UNT	FIU
First downs	16	15
Total yards	345	344
Rushing yards	92	116
Passing yards	253	228
Turnovers	3	1
Time of possession	32:32	27:28

Team	Category	Player	Statistics
North Texas	Passing	Giovanni Vizza	31/54, 253 yards, TD, 2 INT
North Texas	Rushing	Micah Mosley	9 rushes, 65 yards, TD
North Texas	Receiving	Sam Dibrell	7 receptions, 60 yards
FIU	Passing	Paul McCall	11/19, 228 yards, 3 TD
FIU	Rushing	A'mod Ned	17 rushes, 74 yards
FIU	Receiving	Trenard Turner	2 receptions, 84 yards, TD
