= 2009 North Texas Mean Green football team =

American college football season

2009 North Texas Mean Green football
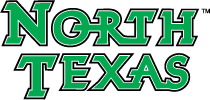
- Conference: Sun Belt Conference
- Record: 2–10 (1–7 Sun Belt)
- Head coach: Todd Dodge (3rd season)
- Offensive coordinator: Todd Ford (3rd season)
- Offensive scheme: Spread option
- Defensive coordinator: Gary DeLoach (5th season)
- Base defense: 4–3
- Home stadium: Fouts Field

2009 Sun Belt Conference football standings
| | Conf. | | | Overall |
| Team | W | | L | W | | L |
|---|---|---|---|---|---|---|
| Troy $ | 8 | – | 0 | 9 | – | 4 |
| Middle Tennessee | 7 | – | 1 | 10 | – | 3 |
| Louisiana–Monroe | 5 | – | 3 | 6 | – | 6 |
| Florida Atlantic | 5 | – | 3 | 5 | – | 7 |
| Louisiana–Lafayette | 4 | – | 4 | 6 | – | 6 |
| Arkansas State | 3 | – | 5 | 4 | – | 8 |
| FIU | 3 | – | 5 | 3 | – | 9 |
| North Texas | 1 | – | 7 | 2 | – | 10 |
| Western Kentucky | 0 | – | 8 | 0 | – | 12 |
$ – Conference champion

The 2009 North Texas Mean Green football team represented the University of North Texas as a member of the Sun Belt Conference during the 2009 NCAA Division I FBS football season. Led third-year head coach, the Mean Green compiled an overall record of 2–10 with a mark 1–7 in conference play, placing eighth in Sun Belt. The team played home games at the Fouts Field in Denton, Texas.

== Schedule ==
| Date | Time | Opponent | Site | TV | Result | Attendance | Source |
|---|---|---|---|---|---|---|---|
| September 3 | 6:30 pm | at Ball State* | Scheumann Stadium; Muncie, IN | ESPNU | W 20–10 | 16,054 | |
| September 12 | 6:05 pm | Ohio* | Fouts Field; Denton, TX | TXA 21 | L 30–31 ^{2OT} | 16,674 | |
| September 19 | 11:21 am | at No. 4 Alabama* | Bryant–Denny Stadium; Tuscaloosa, AL | SEC Network | L 7–53 | 92,012 | |
| September 26 | 6:05 pm | Middle Tennessee | Fouts Field; Denton, TX | | L 21–37 | 22,346 | |
| October 10 | 6:05 pm | at Louisiana–Lafayette | Cajun Field; Lafayette, LA | | L 34–38 | 12,141 | |
| October 17 | 7:05 pm | Florida Atlantic^{†} | Fouts Field; Denton, TX | | L 40–44 | 23,319 | |
| October 24 | 2:30 pm | at Troy | Movie Gallery Stadium; Troy, AL | CSS | L 26–50 | 20,032 | |
| October 31 | 3:05 pm | Western Kentucky | Fouts Field; Denton, TX | | W 68–49 | 11,214 | |
| November 7 | 3:05 pm | Louisiana-Monroe | Fouts Field; Denton, TX | | L 6–33 | 12,167 | |
| November 14 | 6:00 pm | at FIU | FIU Stadium; Miami, FL | | L 28–35 | 11,128 | |
| November 21 | 3:05 pm | Army* | Fouts Field; Denton, TX | TXA 21 | L 13–17 | 23,647 | |
| November 28 | 2:05 pm | at Arkansas State | ASU Stadium; Jonesboro, AR | | L 26–30 | 8,754 | |
*Non-conference game; ^{†}Homecoming; Rankings from AP Poll released prior to the game; All times are in Central time

== Game summaries ==
=== Ball State ===
| | 1 | 2 | 3 | 4 | Total |
|---|---|---|---|---|---|
| North Texas | 7 | 3 | 0 | 10 | 20 |
| Ball State | 0 | 0 | 3 | 7 | 10 |

1st Quarter

- 09:24 UNT- Lance Dunbar 3 Yd Run (Jeremy Knot Kick) 7–0

2nd Quarter

- 01:19 UNT- Jeremy Knot 24 Yd FG 10–0

3rd Quarter

- 06:19 BALL- Ian McGarvey 21 Yd FG 10–3

4th Quarter

- 12:41 BALL- MiQuale Lewis 27 Yd Run (Ian Mcgarvey Kick) 10–10
- 10:46 UNT- Michael Outlaw 4 Yd Pass from Riley Dodge (Jeremy Knott Kick) 17–10
- 07:36 UNT- Jeremy Knott 19 Yd FG 20–10

=== Ohio ===
| | 1 | 2 | 3 | 4 | OT | Total |
|---|---|---|---|---|---|---|
| Ohio | 0 | 3 | 10 | 7 | 11 | 31 |
| North Texas | 3 | 7 | 7 | 3 | 10 | 30 |

1st Quarter

- 01:07 UNT- Jeremy Knott 32 Yd FG 0–3

2nd Quarter

- 12:25 UNT- Cam Montgomery 4 Yd Run (Jeremy Knott Kick) 0–10
- 00:06 OHIO- Matt Weller 44 Yd FG 3–10

3rd Quarter

- 13:21 OHIO- Matt Weller 47 yd fg 6–10
- 08:43 UNT- Jamaal Jackson 16 Yd Pass From Riley Dodge (Jeremy Knott Kick) 6–17
- 02:52 OHIO- Riley Dunlop 32 Yd Pass From Theo Scott (Matt Weller Kick) 13–17

4th Quarter

- 08:44 OHIO- Kenny Jackson 69 Yd Interception Return (Matt Weller Kick) 20–17
- 00:46 UNT- Jeremy Knott 18 Yd FG 20–20

1st Overtime

- OHIO- Matt Weller 35 Yd 23–20
- UNT- Jeremy Knott 22 Yd 23–23

2nd Overtime

- UNT- Cam Montgomery 7 Yd Run (Jeremy Knott Kick) 23–30
- OHIO- Taylor Price 15 Yd Pass From Theo Scott (Theo Scott Pass To Taylor Price For Two-Point Conversion) 31–30

=== Alabama ===
| | 1 | 2 | 3 | 4 | Total |
|---|---|---|---|---|---|
| North Texas | 0 | 0 | 7 | 0 | 7 |
| #4 Alabama | 14 | 16 | 14 | 9 | 53 |

1st Quarter

- 07:47 ALA- Greg McElroy 2 Yd Run (Leigh Tiffin Kick) 0–7
- 02:52 ALA- Marquis Maze 34 Yd Pass From Greg McElroy (Leigh Tiffin Kick) 0–14

2nd Quarter

- 11:56 ALA- Trent Richardson 1 Yd Run (Leigh Tiffin Kick) 0–21
- 03:56 ALA- Mark Ingram 29 Yd Pass From Greg McElroy (Pat Failed) 0–27
- 00:00 ALA- Leigh Tiffin 35 Yd FG 0–30

3rd Quarter

- 12:26 ALA- Mark Ingram 5 Yd Run (Leigh Tiffin Kick) 0–37
- 04:29 ALA- Terry Grant 1 Yd Run (Leigh Tiffin Kick) 0–44
- 02:11 UNT- Lance Dunbar 34 Yd Pass From Nathan Tune (Jeremy Knott Kick) 7–44

4th Quarter

- 11:42 ALA- Leigh Tiffin 20 Yd FG 7–47
- 05:59 ALA- Terry Grant 9 Yd Run (Pat Failed) 7–53

=== Middle Tennessee ===
| | 1 | 2 | 3 | 4 | Total |
|---|---|---|---|---|---|
| MTSU | 10 | 20 | 0 | 7 | 37 |
| North Texas | 7 | 0 | 14 | 0 | 21 |

1st Quarter

- 11:38 MTSU- Benjamin Cunningham 50 Yd Pass From Dwight Dasher (Alan Gendreau Kick) 7–0
- 09:17 MTSU- Alan Gendreau 20 Yd FG 10–0
- 01:47 UNT- Lance Dunbar 66 Yd Run (Jeremy Knott Kick) 10–7

2nd Quarter

- 14:04 MTSU- Alan Gendreau 31 Yd FG 13–7
- 11:55 MTSU- Dwight Dasher 6 Yd Run (Alan Gendreau Kick) 20–7
- 04:43 MTSU- Dwight Dasher 2 Yd Run (Alan Gendreau Kick) 27–7
- 00:22 MTSU- Alan Gendreau 48 Yd FG 30–7

3rd Quarter

- 07:49 UNT- Riley Dodge 4 Yd Run (Jeremy Knott Kick) 30–14
- 00:02 UNT- Lance Dunbar 18 Yd Run (Jeremy Knott Kick) 30–21

4th Quarter

- 10:54 MTSU- Desmond Gee 24 Yd Pass From Dwight Dasher (Alan Gendreau Kick) 37–21

=== Louisiana–Lafayette ===
| | 1 | 2 | 3 | 4 | Total |
|---|---|---|---|---|---|
| North Texas | 3 | 21 | 10 | 0 | 34 |
| Louisiana–Lafayette | 7 | 17 | 0 | 14 | 38 |

1st Quarter

- 08:10 UNT- Jeremy Knott 41 Yd FG 3–0
- 00:37 ULL- Dwight Bentley 70 Yd Interception Return (Tyler Albrecht Kick) 3–7

2nd Quarter

- 13:57 ULL- Tyler Albrecht 45 Yd FG 3–10
- 09:42 UNT- Lance Dunbar 1 Yd Run (Jeremy Knott Kick) 10–10
- 06:14 ULL- Chris Masson 25 Yd Run (Tyler Albrecht Kick) 10–17
- 04:41 ULL- Andrew Joseph 33 Yd Return Of Blocked Punt (Tyler Albrecht Kick) 10–24
- 03:48 UNT- Lance Dunbar 37 Yd Run (Jeremy Knott Kick) 17–24
- 00:37 UNT- Lance Dunbar 1 Yd Run (Jeremy Knott Kick) 24–24

3rd Quarter

- 10:39 UNT- Jeremy Knott 27 Yd FG 27–24
- 03:51 UNT- Lance Dunbar 1 Yd Run (Jeremy Knott Kick) 34–24

4th Quarter

- 09:26 ULL- Brad McGuire 1 Yd Run (Tyler Albrecht Kick) 34–31
- 00:27 ULL- Marlin Miller 4 Yd Pass From Chris Masson (Tyler Albrecht Kick) 34–38

=== Florida Atlantic ===
| | 1 | 2 | 3 | 4 | Total |
|---|---|---|---|---|---|
| FAU | 0 | 30 | 7 | 7 | 44 |
| North Texas | 13 | 6 | 14 | 7 | 40 |

=== Troy ===
| | 1 | 2 | 3 | 4 | Total |
|---|---|---|---|---|---|
| North Texas | 0 | 7 | 6 | 13 | 26 |
| Troy | 17 | 17 | 16 | 0 | 50 |

=== Western Kentucky ===
| | 1 | 2 | 3 | 4 | Total |
|---|---|---|---|---|---|
| Western Kentucky | 14 | 21 | 14 | 0 | 49 |
| North Texas | 14 | 14 | 21 | 19 | 68 |

=== Louisiana–Monroe ===
| | 1 | 2 | 3 | 4 | Total |
|---|---|---|---|---|---|
| Louisiana–Monroe | 6 | 10 | 10 | 7 | 33 |
| North Texas | 3 | 0 | 3 | 0 | 6 |

=== FIU ===
| | 1 | 2 | 3 | 4 | Total |
|---|---|---|---|---|---|
| North Texas | 14 | 14 | 0 | 0 | 28 |
| FIU | 14 | 0 | 7 | 14 | 35 |

=== Army ===
| | 1 | 2 | 3 | 4 | Total |
|---|---|---|---|---|---|
| Army | 0 | 3 | 7 | 7 | 17 |
| North Texas | 7 | 0 | 0 | 6 | 13 |

=== Arkansas State ===
| | 1 | 2 | 3 | 4 | Total |
|---|---|---|---|---|---|
| North Texas | 0 | 7 | 7 | 12 | 26 |
| Arkansas State | 14 | 13 | 3 | 0 | 30 |
