= Ronnie Thompson (American football) =

American football player and coach

Biographical details
- Born: c. 1944; Port Arthur, Texas

Playing career
- 1965–1967: Louisiana College

Coaching career (HC unless noted)
- 1968–1970: Texas City HS (TX)
- 1971–1973: Jefferson HS (TX) (assistant)
- 1974–1975: Vidor HS (TX)
- 1976–1977: Lamar (OC)
- 1978–1981: Thomas Jefferson HS (TX)
- 1982–1985: Texas (QB/RB)
- 1986–1988: Texas A&M (QB/RB)
- 1989–1992: South Garland (TX) (OC)
- 1993–2001: South Garland HS
- 2006–2008: Memorial HS (TX)

Head coaching record
- Overall: 89–77–3

Ronald H. Thompson (born c. 1944) is an American former football coach. He coached for almost 40 years in the high school and collegiate ranks.

Thompson graduated in 1962 from Jefferson High School in Port Arthur, Texas and went on to play at Louisiana College. After graduation, he coached at various high schools. As a young assistant coach at San Antonio Jefferson High School, he closely followed the exploits of the 1971 4A state champions Robert E. Lee High School, playing a pass-happy offense coached by John Ferrara, who in 1975 became an assistant at SMU. In 1978 Thompson installed a very similar offense at Port Arthur Jefferson High School, led by quarterback-receiver duo Todd Dodge and Brent Duhon. Jefferson reached the 1980 state championship game but lost to Odessa Permian.

A year after Dodge left for Texas, Thompson joined the Longhorns as backfield coach under Fred Akers. Later Thompson went to coach at Texas A&M University under offensive coordinator Lynn Amedee and head coach Jackie Sherrill. He is a retired head coach from Port Arthur Memorial High School.
