= Mike Canales =

American football player and coach (born 1961)

Current position
- Title: Offensive coordinator & quarterbacks coach
- Team: Peru State
- Conference: HAAC

Biographical details
- Born: June 21, 1961 (age 65); Coronado, California, U.S.

Playing career
- 1981–1983: Utah State
- Position: Quarterback

Coaching career (HC unless noted)
- 1985–1986: BYU (GA)
- 1987–1994: Snow (OC/QB)
- 1995: Pacific (CA) (QB)
- 1996–2000: South Florida (OC/QB)
- 2001–2002: NC State (PGC/QB)
- 2003: New York Jets (WR)
- 2004–2005: Arizona (OC/QB)
- 2006: Arizona (co-OC/QB)
- 2007–2008: South Florida (PGC/WR)
- 2009: South Florida (OC/QB)
- 2010: North Texas (OC/QB)
- 2010: North Texas (interim HC)
- 2011–2015: North Texas (AHC/OC/QB)
- 2015: North Texas (interim HC)
- 2016: Utah State (AHC/RB/TE)
- 2017: Tennessee (QB)
- 2018–2020: UTEP (OC/QB)
- 2021: Maryland (Analyst)
- 2022: Bethune-Cookman (OC/QB)
- 2023–2025: Southeastern (OC/QB)
- 2026–present: Peru State (OC/QB)

Head coaching record
- Overall: 3–9

Michael Sid Canales (born June 21, 1961) is an American football coach and former player. He is the offensive coordinator and quarterbacks coach for Peru State College, positions he has held since 2026. He previously was the offensive coordinator and quarterbacks coach for the University of North Texas, a position he held from 2010 to 2015. He became the interim head coach of the Mean Green twice, after the firing of Todd Dodge in 2010 and Dan McCarney in 2015. After a brief stint with Utah State in 2016, he was named the quarterbacks coach at the University of Tennessee in January 2017, reuniting with offensive coordinator Larry Scott, with whom he worked while at the University of South Florida. From 2018 until 2020, Canales was the offensive coordinator at the University of Texas at El Paso.

Canales attended Utah State University, where he was a three-year starting quarterback on the football team.

== Coaching career ==
During the 2010 season at North Texas, he was promoted from offensive coordinator to interim head coach after the mid-season termination of his predecessor, Todd Dodge. North Texas averaged 33.8 points a game after Canales took over as head coach, after averaging 16.9 points in the first seven games of the season. Canales amassed a 2–3 record as the interim head coach of the Mean Green.

Despite North Texas players' support for Canales, the full-time head coaching position was awarded to former Iowa State head coach Dan McCarney. McCarney retained Canales as offensive coordinator.

Canales took over again on an interim basis after McCarney was fired five games into the 2015 season, a stretch in which North Texas went 0–5. Following a 1–6 record in his second interim tenure, and athletic director Rick Villarreal announced Canales wouldn't return in any facet for the 2016 season.

On January 19, 2017, Canales was hired as the quarterbacks coach at the University of Tennessee.

== Head coaching record ==
| Year | Team | Overall | Conference | Standing | Bowl/playoffs |
|---|---|---|---|---|---|
North Texas Mean Green (Sun Belt Conference) (2010)
| 2010 | North Texas | 2–3 (Note: Todd Dodge served as head coach for North Texas for the first seven games of the 2010 season before he was fired. Canales was appointed interim head coach and led the team for the final five games of the season. North Texas finished the year with an overall record of 3–9 and a mark of 3–5 in conference play.) | 2–2 | T–6th | |
North Texas Mean Green (Conference USA) (2015)
| 2015 | North Texas | 1–6 (Note: Dan McCarney served as head coach for North Texas for the five games of the 2015 season before he was fired. Canales was appointed interim head coach and led the team for the final seven games of the season. North Texas finished the year with an overall record of 1–11 and a mark of 1–7 in conference play.) | 1–5 | 6th (West) | |
| North Texas: | | 3–9 | 3–7 | | |
| Total: | | 3–9 | | | |
