= Chandler Morris =

American football player (born 2000)

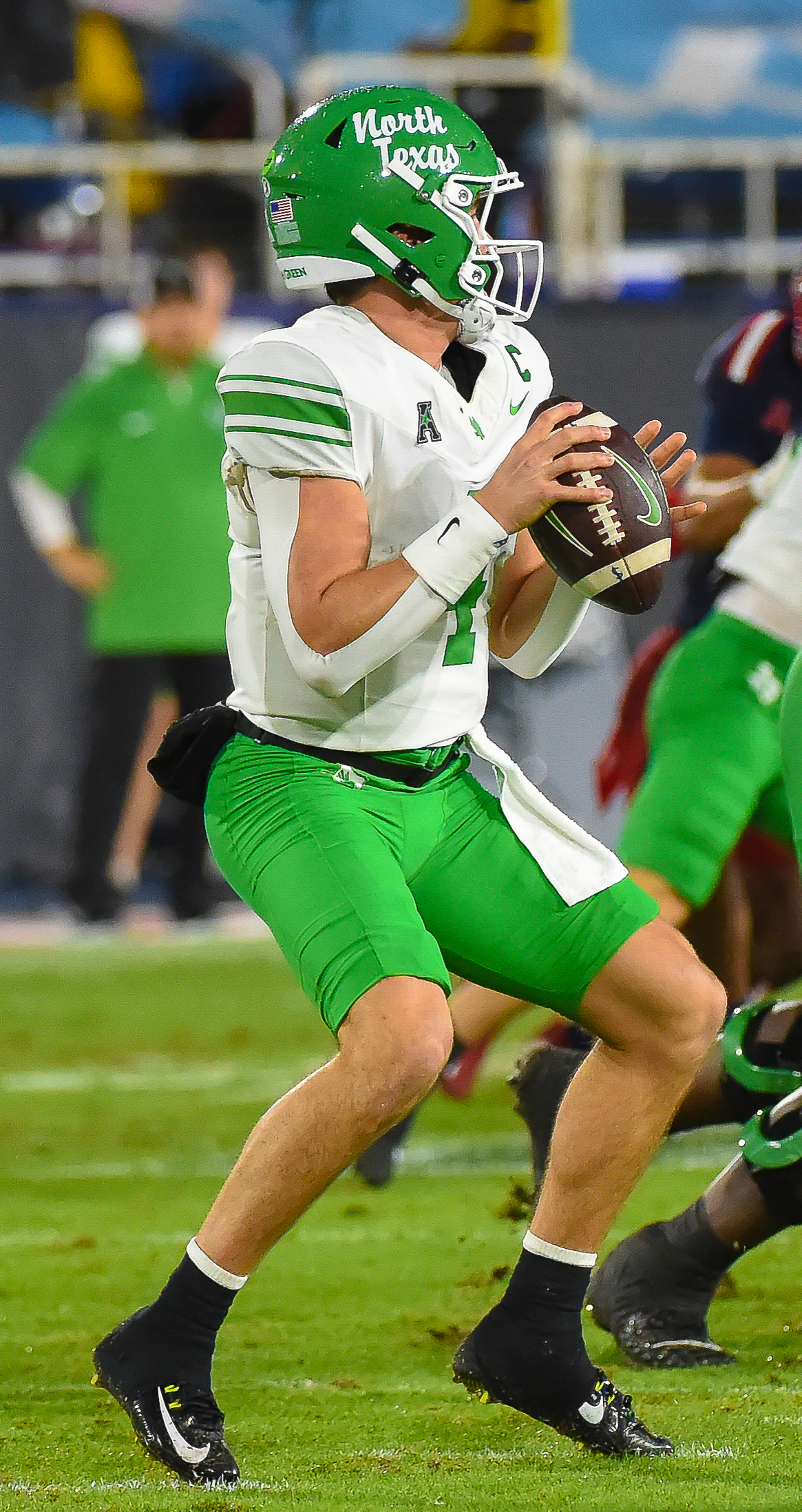
- Morris with North Texas in 2024 in a game at FAU

Profile
- Position: Quarterback

Personal information
- Born: December 26, 2000 (age 25); Houston, Texas, U.S.
- Listed height: 6 ft 0 in (1.83 m)
- Listed weight: 190 lb (86 kg)

Career information
- High school: Highland Park (TX)
- College: Oklahoma (2020); TCU (2021–2023); North Texas (2024); Virginia (2025)
- NFL draft: 2026: undrafted

Awards and highlights
- Second-team All-AAC (2024); 2025 Gator Bowl MVP
- Stats at ESPN

Chandler Morris (born December 26, 2000) is an American professional football quarterback. He played college football for the Oklahoma Sooners, TCU Horned Frogs, North Texas Mean Green, and Virginia Cavaliers.

== Early life ==
Morris was born in Houston and, as the son of legendary Lake Travis High School football coach, Chad Morris, grew up in several different locations as the family followed the elder Morris' career throughout Texas and including time in both Oklahoma and South Carolina. After his father became the head coach at Southern Methodist University, he attended Highland Park High School, eventually becoming an Under Armour All-American. Morris led his team to a perfect 16–0 record while playing quarterback as a junior and won the Class 5A-1 state championship, being named most valuable player in the championship while finishing the season with 4,036 passing yards and 46 touchdowns with only six interceptions thrown. As a senior, he passed for 3,658 yards and 42 touchdowns, additionally totaling 635 rushing yards for 17 touchdowns on his way to earning district MVP honors. Ranked a three-star recruit, he initially committed to play college football for the Arkansas Razorbacks, but de-committed after his father was fired as their coach. He instead began his collegiate career with the Oklahoma Sooners.

== College career ==
=== Oklahoma ===
Morris signed his National Letter of Intent with Oklahoma on January 2, 2020, and enrolled at the university on August 1, 2020, joining head coach Lincoln Riley. As a true freshman, he served as the team’s third-string quarterback behind starter Spencer Rattler and Tanner Mordecai.

He made his collegiate debut in the season opener against Missouri State, completing both of his pass attempts for 37 yards and adding 25 rushing yards in the 48–0 victory. He also saw limited action in three other regular-season games, including his first career touchdown on a 13-yard rush in a 62–9 win over Kansas. Morris appeared briefly in the Cotton Bowl, completing one of two passes for two yards in a 55–20 victory over Florida. Overall, he finished the season with three completions on five attempts for 39 passing yards and 44 rushing yards.

Following the season, Morris entered the transfer portal on January 1, 2021.

=== TCU ===
On January 3, 2021, Morris transferred to TCU, joining head coach Gary Patterson. Morris began the 2021 season as the team’s third-string quarterback, behind Max Duggan and Matthew Downing. He made his Horned Frogs debut in the season opener against Duquesne, relieving Downing and throwing a 20-yard touchdown pass on his first and only attempt in a 45–3 victory. His next action came in Week 8 against Kansas State, when he relieved Duggan in the second half with TCU trailing 21–5. Morris completed 9 of 13 passes for 111 yards in the loss. Following the Kansas State contest and a 3–5 record, Patterson resigned, and interim head coach Jerry Kill named Morris the starter for the next game against the No. 14 Baylor Bears. In his first collegiate start, Morris earned Big 12 Conference Offensive Player of the Week honors after leading TCU to a 30–28 upset victory. He accounted for 531 total yards, including 461 passing yards and 70 rushing yards, throwing two touchdowns and rushing for another. The Horned Frogs fell the following week to No. 10 Oklahoma State, after which Duggan returned as the starter for the remaining two games. For the 2021 season, Morris appeared in four games while preserving his redshirt. He completed 50 of 75 passes for 717 yards and three touchdowns, adding 83 rushing yards and one rushing touchdown.

In 2022, Morris competed with returning starter Max Duggan and Sam Jackson for the starting quarterback role, and new head coach Sonny Dykes ultimately named him the starter. Leading 14–6 against Colorado in the third quarter of the season opener, Morris sustained a serious knee injury that sidelined him for the next eight games. Upon returning, he served as Duggan’s backup and saw limited action for the remainder of the season. He finished the 2022 season having completed 18 of 27 passes for 145 yards and one touchdown, as TCU advanced to the National Championship, ultimately finishing as the runner-up.

In 2023, Morris was named TCU’s starting quarterback, with Josh Hoover serving as his primary backup. In the season opener against Colorado, Morris completed 24 of 42 passes for 279 yards and two touchdowns, adding 30 rushing yards and a rushing touchdown, though the Horned Frogs were upset 45–42. After TCU began the season 3–2, Morris re-injured his left Medial collateral ligament (MCL) in a game against Iowa State, forcing him to miss the next four contests. He returned briefly to relieve Hoover against Baylor, which was the only additional action he saw that season. He finished 2023 having completed 133 of 203 passes for 1,523 yards, 12 touchdowns, and five interceptions, while adding 249 rushing yards and three rushing touchdowns.

On December 18, 2023, Morris announced that he would enter the NCAA transfer portal for the second time.

=== North Texas ===
On January 13, 2024, Morris announced that he would be transferring to North Texas.

Morris opened the 2024 season with a breakout performance in a 52–38 road victory over South Alabama, throwing for 415 yards and three touchdowns. Over the course of the season, he recorded seven games with at least 300 passing yards, including four 400-yard performances. Among his most notable outings were a 439-yard, five-touchdown performance in a win over Tulsa, 445 yards in a loss at Memphis, and a career-high 449-yard game against Tulane. His production anchored one of the conference’s most pass-oriented offenses under head coach Eric Morris and placed him among the national leaders in passing yards per game and total offense.

Morris finished the 2024 season completing 322 of 512 passes (62.9 percent) for 3,774 yards with 31 touchdowns and 12 interceptions. He also added 242 rushing yards and four rushing touchdowns, concluding the season as one of the most productive quarterbacks in program history. His 35 total touchdowns set a North Texas single-season record.

During the season, Morris earned two conference Offensive Player of the Week honors and was later named second-team All-AAC. On December 9, 2024, he announced that he would enter the NCAA transfer portal for the third time. He subsequently opted out of North Texas’s First Responder Bowl.

=== Virginia ===
On December 16, 2024, Morris transferred to the Virginia Cavaliers. Morris made his Cavaliers debut in the 2025 season opener against Coastal Carolina, completing 19 of 27 passes for 264 yards and two touchdowns while adding 50 rushing yards in the victory. After a loss to NC State, he led Virginia to seven consecutive victories—the program’s first seven-game win streak since 2007—including a win over Stanford, where he threw for a season-high 380 yards and four touchdowns. During the streak, Morris guided the Cavaliers through three overtime victories and earned ACC Quarterback of the Week honors in Weeks Four and Five. The Cavaliers started 8–1 overall and 5–0 in ACC play for the first time in program history, marking their best start since 1990.

Following a loss to Wake Forest, in which Morris took a hit to the head in the second quarter and left the game injured, Virginia won its final two regular-season games against Duke and Virginia Tech, clinching a berth in the ACC Championship—the program’s first since 2019. In the 2025 ACC Championship Game against Duke, Morris completed 21 of 43 passes for 216 yards with two touchdowns and two interceptions. In overtime, trailing by seven, he was intercepted on a flea-flicker, ending the Cavaliers’ College Football Playoff hopes.

Morris and the Cavaliers rebounded in the 2025 Gator Bowl against Missouri, winning 13–7. He completed 25 of 38 passes for 198 yards and was named Bowl MVP. On the season, Morris completed 64.8 percent of his passes (282 of 436) for 3,000 yards with 16 touchdowns and nine interceptions, adding 245 rushing yards and a career-high five rushing touchdowns. The victory secured Virginia’s winningest season in program history, finishing 11–3.

=== Statistics ===
Season	Team	Games			Passing								Rushing			
Season	Team	GP	GS	Record	Cmp	Att	Pct	Yds	Y/A	TD	Int	Rtg	Att	Yds	Avg	TD
2020	Oklahoma	5	0	—	3	5	60.0	39	7.8	0	0	125.5	5	44	8.8	2
2021	TCU	4	2	1−1	50	75	66.7	717	9.6	3	0	160.2	25	83	3.3	1
2022	TCU	4	1	1−0	18	27	66.7	145	5.4	1	0	124.0	6	24	6.0	0
2023	TCU	7	6	3−3	133	203	65.5	1,532	7.5	12	5	143.5	45	249	5.5	3
2024	North Texas	12	12	6−6	322	512	62.9	3,774	7.4	31	12	140.1	60	242	4.0	4
2025	Virginia	14	14	11−3	282	436	64.7	3,000	6.9	16	9	130.5	64	245	3.8	5
Career		46	35	22−13	808	1,258	64.2	9,207	7.3	63	26	138.1	205	887	4.3	15

== Professional career ==
In May 2026, Morris received a tryout with the Tampa Bay Buccaneers.
