= Lenny Dunlap =

American football player (born 1949)

No. 46, 39, 32
- Position: Cornerback

Personal information
- Born: June 25, 1949 (age 77); Monroe, Louisiana, U.S.
- Listed height: 6 ft 1 in (1.85 m)
- Listed weight: 196 lb (89 kg)

Career information
- High school: Carverdale (TX)
- College: North Texas
- NFL draft: 1971: 1st round, 26th overall pick

Career history
- Baltimore Colts (1971); San Diego Chargers (1972–1974); Detroit Lions (1975)

Career NFL statistics
- Fumble recoveries: 6
- Interceptions: 5
- Return yards: 628
- Stats at Pro Football Reference

Leonard Dunlap (born June 25, 1949) is an American former professional football player who was a cornerback in the National Football League (NFL) in the 1970s. He attended the University of North Texas and was selected by the Baltimore Colts in the 1971 NFL draft.
