= Cole Hedlund =

American football player (born 1995)

No. 9
- Position: Placekicker

Personal information
- Born: March 15, 1995 (age 31); Argyle, Texas
- Listed height: 5 ft 9 in (1.75 m)
- Listed weight: 162 lb (73 kg)

Career information
- High school: Argyle (TX)
- College: Arkansas (2015-2017); North Texas (2018)
- NFL draft: 2019: undrafted

Career history
- Indianapolis Colts (2019)*
- * Offseason or practice squad member only

Awards and highlights
- First-team All-Conference USA (2018)

Cole Hedlund (born March 15, 1995) is an American former football placekicker. He played college football at Arkansas and North Texas. He was signed by the Indianapolis Colts as an undrafted free agent in 2019.

== College career ==
Hedlund played college football for both the Arkansas Razorbacks from 2015 to 2017 and for the North Texas Mean Green in 2018. As a freshman in 2015, he converted all 58 extra point attempts and 9 of 15 field goal attempts. As a sophomore in 2016, he converted all 25 extra point attempts and 5 of 7 field goal attempts. As a junior in 2017, he only appeared in two games but converted all 8 extra point attempts and 0 of 2 field goal attempts. As a senior in 2018 after transferring to North Texas, he converted 51 of 54 extra point attempts and 19 of 22 field goal attempts.

== Professional career ==
After going undrafted in the 2019 NFL draft, Hedlund signed with the Indianapolis Colts on May 5, 2019. He was waived by the Colts on August 31, 2019.
