= Lance Dunbar =

American football player (born 1990)

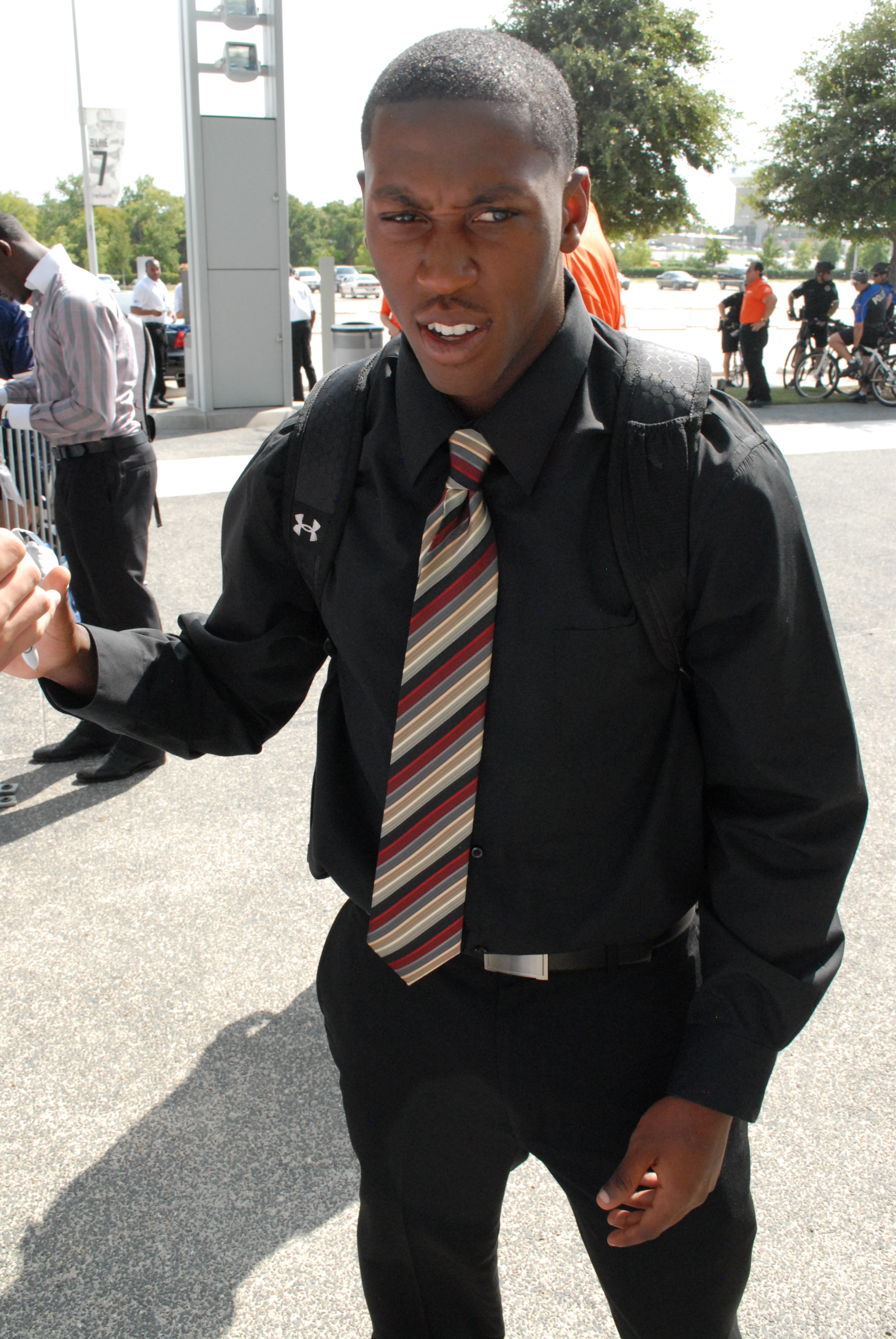
- Dunbar in 2012

Idaho Vandals
- Title: Running backs coach

Personal information
- Born: January 25, 1990 (age 36); New Orleans, Louisiana, U.S.
- Listed height: 5 ft 8 in (1.73 m)
- Listed weight: 187 lb (85 kg)

Career information
- Position: Running back (No. 25)
- High school: Haltom (Haltom City, Texas)
- College: North Texas (2008–2011)
- NFL draft: 2012: undrafted

Career history

Playing
- Dallas Cowboys (2012–2016); Los Angeles Rams (2017); Dallas Renegades (2020)

Coaching
- Tulsa (2023–2024) Offensive quality control analyst; Idaho (2025–present) Running backs coach

Awards and highlights
- 3× All-Sun Belt (2009, 2010, 2011); North Texas Athletics Hall of Fame (2016)

Career NFL statistics
- Rushing attempts: 105
- Rushing yards: 473
- Rushing touchdowns: 2
- Receptions: 69
- Receiving yards: 647
- Return yards: 517
- Stats at Pro Football Reference

Lance Dunbar Jr. (born January 25, 1990) is an American former professional football player who was a running back in the National Football League (NFL) for six seasons. He played college football for the North Texas Mean Green and was signed by the Dallas Cowboys as an undrafted free agent in 2012.

== Early life ==
Dunbar was born in New Orleans, Louisiana, and lived in New Orleans until 2005, when he was forced to move due to Hurricane Katrina. He initially attended De La Salle High School (New Orleans, Louisiana) where he played running back and safety, but transferred after his family settled in Haltom City, Texas. In his junior and senior years at Haltom High School, he had over 2,200 combined rushing yards and was named first-team All-district both years.

== College career ==
Dunbar accepted a football scholarship from the University of North Texas, as it was close to his home. He played in his first college football game on September 6, 2008, against Tulsa. He had 10 rushing attempts for 72 yards and a touchdown, and he also had three receptions for 25 yards. He played in five games that season, finishing with 178 rushing yards on 39 attempts, for a 4.6 average.

In 2009, Dunbar played in all 12 of North Texas' games. He did not have more than 16 rushing attempts during the first four games. On October 10, against Louisiana-Lafayette, he had 32 carries and set career-highs with 187 rushing yards and four touchdowns. Against Florida Atlantic one week later, he ran for 238 yards, his highest total of the season, and had three touchdowns. Dunbar had 1,378 rushing yards and a conference-leading 17 rushing touchdowns in 2009 and was the team's leading rusher. North Texas had a record of 2–10.

Dunbar was named to the preseason All-Sun Belt team in 2010. He did not rush for over 141 yards in any of the first seven games that year. However, in the last five games, he rushed for over 200 yards three times. During the final game of the season, against Kansas State University, he set a career-high for rushing yards, with 270. He had 22 carries and averaged 12.3 yards per attempt that day. In addition, he scored three rushing touchdowns and one receiving touchdown. North Texas lost that game and had a 3–9 record in 2010. He finished his junior year with 1,553 rushing yards and 13 rushing touchdowns. He led North Texas in rushing yards for the second-straight season. In his final season in 2011, he had 1,115 rushing yards and 10 rushing touchdowns to go along with 29 receptions for 350 receiving yards and two touchdowns.

Dunbar finished his college career with many accomplishments:

- Leading rusher in school history with 4,224 rushing yards
- First in career touchdowns with 49.
- First in career all-purpose yards with 5,375.
- Tied in career 100-yard rushing games (21) with Patrick Cobbs.
- First in career points scored with 294.
- First in career rushing touchdowns with 41.
- Second in career rushing attempts with 782.
- First running back in school history with three consecutive 1,000-yard rushing seasons.
- Second running back in school history two consecutive 1,000-yard rushing seasons.

In 2016, Dunbar was inducted into the North Texas Athletics Hall of Fame.

== Professional career ==
=== Dallas Cowboys ===
After being passed over in the 2012 NFL draft because of size concerns, he was signed as an undrafted free agent by the Dallas Cowboys on April 28, 2012. Dunbar showed off his skills during the preseason and made the team's practice squad as a running back and special teams player. On October 8, he was promoted to the Cowboys' 53-man roster. He was also used as a gunner covering punts, finishing with 10 special teams tackles. In the 2012 season, he finished with 21 carries for 75 rushing yards.

Dunbar began the 2013 season with the expectation of being a change-of-pace back that could play backup to DeMarco Murray, but injuries (three games missed) and fumble issues impacted his playing time at the start of the season. He was fighting for the third-string running back position with rookie Joseph Randle, when he had a breakout game against the Oakland Raiders, registering 82 rushing yards (6.8 average), but also suffering a season-ending knee injury. For the year, he recorded 150 yards, averaging five yards per attempt, leaving the Cowboys with high hopes about his running ability. In 2014, he did not see much playing time behind Offensive Player of the Year DeMarco Murray and also fell to third-string behind Joseph Randle.

In 2015, after the team lost Murray to the Philadelphia Eagles in free agency and Dez Bryant to injury in the season opener against the New York Giants, Dunbar earned a more prominent role in the offense. In the first game against the Giants, he registered a team-high eight receptions for 70 yards and was a key player in the fourth quarter game-winning drive with two catches for 40 yards. Against the Atlanta Falcons, he finished with a career-high of 10 receptions for 100 yards. He entered the fourth game of the season against the New Orleans Saints as the team's leading receiver and recorded a 45-yard run, before tearing the ACL, the MCL and the patellar tendon in his left knee, during a kickoff return, which was a task he was assigned to replace the recently departed Dwayne Harris. He was placed on the injured reserve list on October 10.

On March 17, 2016, Dunbar re-signed with the Cowboys on a one-year, $1.75 million contract. He began training camp on the physically unable to perform list, while recovering from his previous knee injury. He made a surprising recovery that had him available to play in the last preseason game and that made the Cowboys decide to keep Darren McFadden on the Non Football Injury List. His injury knee flared up and was declared inactive against the Chicago Bears, Green Bay Packers, and Philadelphia Eagles. With the emergence of rookie Ezekiel Elliott, the offseason addition of Alfred Morris, and the late season return of McFadden, his impact and production were limited, finishing with 31 rushing yards, 122 receiving yards, and one rushing touchdown.

=== Los Angeles Rams ===
On March 16, 2017, Dunbar signed a one-year contract with the Los Angeles Rams, who were looking to replace Benny Cunningham. He also reunited with running back coach Skip Peete, who coached him in his first season with the Cowboys. He was placed on the physically unable to perform list to start the 2017 season after dealing with a knee injury. He was activated off PUP to the active roster on November 11, 2017. He finished the season with 11 carries for 51 rushing yards and a touchdown in four games. On March 9, 2018, Dunbar was released by the Rams.

=== Dallas Renegades ===
In 2019, Dunbar was selected in the eighth round of the 2020 XFL draft by the Dallas Renegades. In March, amid the COVID-19 pandemic, the league announced that it would be cancelling the rest of the season. Playing in all 5 games, he registered 30 carries for 146 yards and a score, as well as 26 receptions for 154 yards. He had his contract terminated when the league suspended operations on April 10, 2020.
