= Patrick Cobbs =

American football player and coach (born 1983)

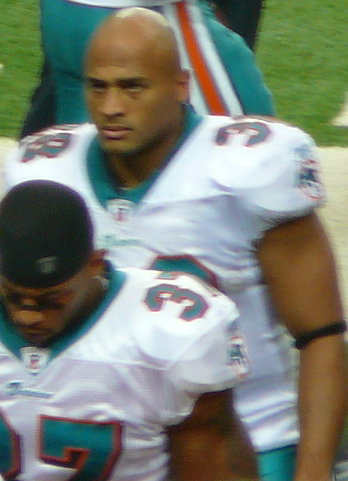
- Cobbs (background) with the Dolphins in 2009

Current position
- Title: Running backs coach, run game coordinator
- Team: Oklahoma State
- Conference: Big 12

Biographical details
- Born: January 31, 1983 (age 43); Shawnee, Oklahoma, U.S.
- Education: University of North Texas

Playing career
- 2001–2005: North Texas
- 2006: New England Patriots (Note: Offseason and/or practice squad member only)
- 2006: Pittsburgh Steelers
- 2006–2010: Miami Dolphins
- 2011: New Orleans Saints
- Position: Running back

Coaching career (HC unless noted)
- 2014–2018: Billy Ryan HS (TX) (RB)
- 2019–2021: North Texas (RB)
- 2022: North Texas (AHC/RB)
- 2023: North Texas (RB)
- 2024–2025: North Texas (RB/RGC)
- 2026–present: Oklahoma State (RB/RGC)

Accomplishments and honors

Awards
- As a player: Sun Belt Offensive Player of the Year (2005); 2× First-team All-Sun Belt (2003, 2005)

Stanley Patrick Cobbs (born January 31, 1983) is an American football coach and former player who currently serves as the run game coordinator and running backs coach at the Oklahoma State University. He played as a running back in the National Football League (NFL) for five seasons with the Pittsburgh Steelers and the Miami Dolphins, and also was a member of the New England Patriots and the New Orleans Saints. He played college football for the North Texas Mean Green and was signed by the Patriots as an undrafted free agent after the 2006 NFL draft.

== Early years ==
Cobbs was a two-way starter at Tecumseh High School in Tecumseh, Oklahoma, playing both running back and safety for the football team. In his junior year, Cobbs rushed for 1,820 yards and 17 touchdowns. As a senior, he rushed for 2,354 yards and 32 touchdowns as he averaged more than eight yards per carry. His performance on offense earned him all-state honors, while he also earned first-team all-area honors as a defensive back after registering 84 tackles and four interceptions. Cobbs finished his high school career with 4,729 rushing yards and 61 touchdowns on offense, while adding 313 tackles and 16 interceptions on defense. Cobbs also ran track and field in high school, where he participated in the 400 meter dash.

== College career ==
Playing in every game as a true freshman for North Texas in 2001, Cobbs racked up 399 rushing yards and three touchdowns on 93 carries. A season-high 112 yards and two scores against Idaho earned him Sun Belt Offensive Player of the Week honors. His 399 rushing yards were best in the Sun Belt Conference. Cobbs also had a 19.2-yard average on kickoff returns, and finished third on the team with 813 all-purpose yards.

Cobbs played in all 13 games as a sophomore in 2002, rushing for 716 yards and eight touchdowns—both second best on the team behind Kevin Galbreath. He had a career game against Louisiana Monroe, rushing for a career-high 128 yards and a team record four touchdowns. Cobbs also led the team in kick return (24.4) and punt return (10.1) average, and had a 50-yard kickoff return in the New Orleans Bowl.

In 2003, Cobbs led the nation in rushing (152.7 yards per game) and scoring (11.5 points per game), while also ranking in the top six in rushing touchdowns (19) and all-purpose yards (1,771 yards). In his first season as the starting running back, Cobbs set three North Texas single-season rushing records and finished in the top five in five different career records. He broke the school record for consecutive 100-yard rushing games, and broke Sun Belt records for rushing yards in a season, rushing yards in a game, as well as rushing touchdowns in a game and longest rush from scrimmage. Cobbs was the only back in the nation to have four 200-yard rushing games that season. The Mean Green were 9-1 when he rushed for more than 100 yards. He also set the Sun Belt single-season mark and the school record with his 1,680 total yards. Cobbs was the first running back at North Texas to lead the nation in rushing and scoring.

In 2004, Cobbs battled numerous injuries in the early part of the season, and after the first few games he took a medical redshirt.

As a senior in 2005, Cobbs was a first team all-Sun Belt Conference running back after leading the conference in total rushing yards with 1,154. Cobbs also led the conference in all-purpose yards with an average of 135.1 yards per game, which is 14 yards per-game better than his closest competitor. In Sun Belt games, Cobbs led the league in rushing yards per game, averaging 127.9—nearly 20 yards per-game more than his closest competitor. His 159.0 all-purpose yards per game against league and was the third-best total in conference history. Cobbs averaged 155 yards rushing in his last four games of the year, including a season-best 197 yards and three touchdowns against Louisiana-Lafayette. He was named the Sun Belt Conference Offensive Player of the Week following his performance in the season-opening win against Middle Tennessee State.

Cobbs finished his career at North Texas as the school's all-time leading rusher with 4,050 yards—making him only the 69th player in NCAA history to eclipse the 4,000-yard rushing mark. Cobbs held North Texas and Sun Belt Conference career records for rushing yards (4,050), rushing touchdowns (36), and all-purpose yards (5,255) until 2011, when he was eclipsed in all of those records by Lance Dunbar. He still owns the school record for rushing attempts with 818. He averaged 5.0 yards per carry over his career and was one of only two running backs ever at North Texas to have two 1,000-yard rushing seasons. He also completed 2-of-3 passes with two touchdowns for a career pass efficiency rating of 407.1. Cobbs averaged 21.0 yards on 35 kickoff returns during his career.

Cobbs was named to the ESPN The Magazine Academic All-America second team after compiling a 3.3 cumulative GPA during his career. He earned two undergraduate degrees at North Texas—a Bachelor's in applied arts and Science and a Bachelor's in sociology.

== Professional career ==
=== New England Patriots ===
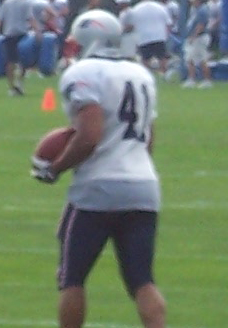
Cobbs in training camp with the New England Patriots in 2006.

Cobbs was originally signed as an undrafted free agent out of North Texas by the New England Patriots on May 15, 2006. Battling for a roster spot, Cobbs led the Patriots in rushing during the preseason with 188 yards and three touchdowns on 38 attempts, while also caught seven passes for 115 yards and a score. He was traded to the Pittsburgh Steelers for an undisclosed draft pick on September 1.

=== Pittsburgh Steelers ===
Cobbs was inactive for the team's first regular season game against the Miami Dolphins, as he was still learning the playbook. A day after the game took place, Cobbs was released by the team. After he cleared waivers, Cobbs refused to sign to the Steelers' practice squad and instead was added to the practice squad of the Dolphins.

=== Miami Dolphins ===
Cobbs remained on the practice squad of the Miami Dolphins until November 27 when he was promoted to the active roster. The team was in need of depth at the running back position after starter Ronnie Brown suffered a broken hand in a Thanksgiving Day contest against the Detroit Lions just a few days prior to Cobbs' promotion. He went on to play on special teams for three games before being inactive for the final two after Brown's return.

Cobbs remained under contract with the Dolphins in 2007, and earned a backup job in training camp. He did not see action until game 7 (October 21), against the New England Patriots when Brown was once again injured. In that game, Cobbs temporarily replaced Jesse Chatman, who had replaced the injured Brown before suffering an injury of his own. Cobbs made the most of his playing time, running for 14 yards and a touchdown on five carries and caught one pass for nine yards. The touchdown was the first of his NFL career.

Cobbs was third-string in 2008 behind Ronnie Brown and Ricky Williams. When his limited opportunity to play arrived, he often shined. He displayed play-making abilities. A certainly bright game for Cobbs was against the Texans; he grabbed 3 passes for 138 yards and 2 touchdowns. One being a 58-yard run and the other an 80-yard run. Cobbs finished the year with 12 rushes for 88 yards and one touchdown. He averaged 7.3 yds/att. He received for 19 catches for 275 yards and two touchdowns. He averaged 14.5 yds/rec.

In Week 5 of the 2009 season, Cobbs tore a knee ligament after being brought down on a reverse wildcat run versus rival the New York Jets. Lex Hilliard is expected to take his place as the third string running back.

For the 2010 season Patrick Cobbs was selected as one of four captains, along with OT Jake Long, LB Karlos Dansby, and S Yeremiah Bell.

=== New Orleans Saints ===
He signed with the New Orleans Saints on August 16, 2011, after Joique Bell was sidelined with a knee injury. Cobbs was released on September 12, 2011, after being placed on injured reserve with an undisclosed injury suffered in the final preseason game.

== Coaching career ==
Cobbs was hired by his alma mater North Texas as the running backs coach in February 2019. He was promoted to run game coordinator in 2024, and kept his duties as the running backs coach.

== See also ==
- List of NCAA major college football yearly scoring leaders
