= John Love (American football) =

American football player (born 1944)

No. 27, 36, 49
- Positions: Wide receiver, Placekicker

Personal information
- Born: February 24, 1944 (age 82); Linden, Texas, U.S.
- Listed height: 5 ft 11 in (1.80 m)
- Listed weight: 185 lb (84 kg)

Career information
- High school: Booker T. Washington (Marlin, Texas)
- College: North Texas (1965-1966)
- NFL draft: 1967: 7th round, 172nd overall pick

Career history
- Washington Redskins (1967); BC Lions (1971); Los Angeles Rams (1972)

Career NFL statistics
- Receptions: 18
- Receiving yards: 267
- Total touchdowns: 4
- Stats at Pro Football Reference

John Louis Love (born February 24, 1944) is an American former professional football player who was a wide receiver in the National Football League (NFL) for the Washington Redskins and Los Angeles Rams. He played college football for the North Texas Mean Green and was selected by the Redskins in the seventh round of the 1967 NFL/AFL draft.
