= Casey Fitzgerald (American football) =

American football player (born 1985)

No. 87
- Position: Wide receiver

Personal information
- Born: December 11, 1985 (age 40); Red Oak, Texas, U.S.
- Listed weight: 185 lb (84 kg)

Career information
- High school: Red Oak (TX)
- College: North Texas (2005–2008)

Awards and highlights
- 2× First-team All-Sun Belt (2007, 2008); NCAA receiving leader (2008)

Casey Fitzgerald (born December 11, 1985) is an American former football player.

Fitzgerald was born in 1985, grew up in Red Oak, Texas, and attended Red Oak High School.

Fitzgerald played college football, initially as a walk-on, for North Texas Mean Green football team in 2005 and 2006. He saw limited action and caught only one pass in 2005. Not having a scholarship, he worked at a fast food burger restaurant to pay for expenses while his mother, a teacher, paid his tuition. After the spring game, he was put on scholarship.

As a sophomore in 2006, he had four catches for 83 yards. He spent most of the year on the "Green Team", a unit made up of walk-ons and scout-team players. However, he impressed with touchdowns of 72 and 85 yards in the 2007 spring game.

As a junior in 2007, he became a starter and caught 111 passes for 1,322 yards and 12 touchdowns. He ranked third in the NCAA and first in the Sun Belt Conference in receptions during the 2007 season. In a 2007 game against SMU, he totaled 327 receiving yards, the fifth highest in NCAA history to that date.

As a senior in 2008, he caught 113 passes for 1,119 yards and six touchdowns. He led the NCAA major colleges that year in total offense and ranked second in receiving yards. He also led the NCAA in receptions and led the Sun Belt Conference in receiving yards in 2008. His 229 career receptions set a North Texas record, and his career total of 2,533 receiving yards ranks third in program history.

Fitzgerald was induced in 2019 into the North Texas Athletics Hall of Fame.

== See also ==
- List of NCAA major college football yearly receiving leaders
