= Jamario Thomas =

American college football player (born 1985)

No. 20
- Position: Running back

Personal information
- Born: May 10, 1985 (age 41)
- Listed height: 5 ft 11 in (1.80 m)
- Listed weight: 210 lb (95 kg)

Career information
- High school: Spring Hill (Longview, Texas)
- College: North Texas (2004–2007)

Awards and highlights
- Third-team All-American (2004); Sun Belt Player of the Year (2004); Sun Belt Offensive Player of the Year (2004); Sun Belt Freshman of the Year (2004); First-team All-Sun Belt (2004)

Jamario Thomas (born May 10, 1985) is an American former football running back who played college football for the North Texas Mean Green. Thomas led the National Collegiate Athletic Association (NCAA) in rushing yards as a true freshman in 2004.

== Early life ==
Thomas played high school football at Spring Hill High School in Longview, Texas.

== College career ==
=== 2004 ===
Thomas posted his best statistical performances his freshman year. In 2004, he was named Sun Belt Conference Player of the Year, Offensive Player of the Year and Freshman of the Year. He led the nation in rushing yards, averaging 180.1 yards per game and ranked fifth in the nation for scoring, averaging 11.3 points per game. He set both school and conference records with 1,801 yards for the season and set the NCAA freshman record for total number of 200 yards games with 5.

Thomas also tied the NCAA record for the being the fastest to reach 1,000 yards at seven games and was one of only three freshmen ever to rush for over 1,800 yards.

=== 2005–2007 seasons ===
Thomas's next two seasons were considered "disappointing" based on his performance his freshman year. Although he has had hamstring problems during his sophomore and junior years, his "sudden free fall is perplexing" to NFL scouts. In his senior year, he played in 11 games but only carried the ball 116 times.

=== Fallout from upperclass years ===
Thomas's performance his sophomore through senior years was considered by NFL Scouts to be less than adequate for the NFL. Injuries slowed Thomas as he moved deeper into his career and he was "snubbed" by the NFL immediately after his senior year and was not picked up during the NFL draft.
