= Steve Ramsey (American football) =

American football player (1948–1999)

No. 16, 10
- Position: Quarterback

Personal information
- Born: April 22, 1948; Dallas, Texas, U.S.
- Died: October 15, 1999 (aged 51); Meridian, Texas, U.S.
- Listed height: 6 ft 2 in (1.88 m)
- Listed weight: 210 lb (95 kg)

Career information
- High school: W.W. Samuell (Dallas)
- College: North Texas
- NFL draft: 1970: 5th round, 126th overall pick

Career history
- New Orleans Saints (1970); Denver Broncos (1971–1976); New York Giants (1977)*
- * Offseason or practice squad member only

Career NFL statistics
- Passing attempts: 921
- Passing completions: 456
- Completion percentage: 49.5%
- TD–INT: 35–58
- Passing yards: 6,437
- Passer rating: 58.9
- Stats at Pro Football Reference

Stephen Wayne Ramsey (April 22, 1948 – October 15, 1999) was an American professional football player who was a quarterback in seven National Football League (NFL) seasons from 1970 to 1976 for two different teams, the New Orleans Saints and the Denver Broncos. He was traded to the New York Giants in exchange for Craig Morton in 1977 but was released before the season began. Ramsey attended W. W. Samuell High School in Dallas, Texas and The University of North Texas in Denton, Texas. He died at age 51 in Texas, after an accident while trying to drive himself to the hospital after having a heart attack.

== NFL career statistics ==
Year	Team	Games			Passing									Rushing					Sacks	
Year	Team	GP	GS	Record	Cmp	Att	Pct	Yds	Avg	Lng	TD	Int	Rtg	Att	Yds	Avg	Lng	TD	Sck	Yds
1970	NOR	1	0	0–0	0	2	0.0	0	0.0	0	0	0	39.6	0	0	0.0	0	0	0	0
1971	DEN	9	5	2–3	84	178	47.2	1,120	6.3	47	5	13	46.6	3	6	2.0	6	0	13	105
1972	DEN	9	5	1–4	65	137	47.4	1,050	7.7	55	3	9	53.5	6	15	2.5	8	2	26	184
1973	DEN	5	0	0–0	10	27	37.0	194	7.2	76	2	2	56.7	0	0	0.0	0	0	0	0
1974	DEN	7	2	1–1	41	74	55.4	580	7.8	43	5	7	64.0	5	-2	-0.4	1	0	9	55
1975	DEN	11	7	3–4	128	233	54.9	1,562	6.7	66	9	14	63.6	6	38	6.3	17	0	23	187
1976	DEN	12	12	7–5	128	270	47.4	1,931	7.2	71	11	13	64.9	13	51	3.9	15	0	39	261
Career		54	31	14–17	456	921	49.5	6,437	7.0	76	35	58	58.9	33	108	3.3	17	2	110	792

== See also ==
- List of NCAA major college football yearly passing leaders
