= Gary DeLoach =

American football player and coach (born 1954)

Biographical details
- Born: June 22, 1954 (age 72); Houston, Texas, U.S.

Playing career
- 1972–1973: Kilgore
- 1974–1975: Howard Payne
- Position: Linebacker

Coaching career (HC unless noted)
- 1976–1978: Stephen F. Austin (GA)
- 1979: Spring Branch HS (TX) (DC)
- 1980–1982: Texas A&M (assistant)
- 1983–1989: Stephen F. Austin (assistant)
- 1990–1996: New Mexico State (DC)
- 1997: Frankfurt Galaxy (DB)
- 1997: Trinity Valley (DC)
- 1998–1999: North Texas (DB)
- 2000–2002: North Texas (DC)
- 2003–2007: UCLA (assistant)
- 2008–2010: North Texas (DC)
- 2012: Northwestern State (AHC/DC/S)

Gary DeLoach (born June 22, 1954) is an American football coach and former player. He served as defensive coordinator at the University of North Texas (UNT) twice, from 2000 to 2002 and again from 2008 until 2010. Most recently, he was the assistant head coach and defensive coordinator at Northwestern State University (NSU) in 2012.

== Early years ==
A native of Houston, Texas, DeLoach graduated from Sam Houston High School in 1972. He played linebacker in high school, making all-district, all-city, and the second-team all-state teams. DeLoach went on to play linebacker at Kilgore Junior College for two years and earned all-conference honors. He then transferred to Howard Payne College in Brownwood, Texas, playing linebacker for an additional two years. He received a bachelor's degree in education from Howard Payne in 1976.

== Coaching career ==
DeLoach began his college coaching career as a graduate assistant and then part-time assistant at Stephen F. Austin University (1976–1978). He then moved to the high school level, serving as defensive coordinator at Spring Branch High School, located in the Greater Houston area, in 1979.

In 1980, DeLoach became a part-time defensive assistant at Texas A&M University under head coach Tom Wilson. In 1983, he returned to Nacogdoches, Texas, as he became the secondary coach under Jim Hess at Stephen F. Austin. DeLoach helped the Lumberjacks to a 10–3 record in 1988, including a Division I-AA quarterfinal playoff game. In 1990, DeLoach followed Hess to New Mexico State University, where he coached the next seven seasons. After a 1–10 in 1996, Hess and his entire staff were fired.

DeLoach became defensive coordinator under Scott Conley at Trinity Valley Community College in Athens, Texas. The Cardinals went undefeated in 1997, compiling a 12–0 and winning the NJCAA National championship. DeLoach's success gained the attention of Ernie Stautner, former longtime defensive coordinator of the Dallas Cowboys, who at that time served as head coach of the Frankfurt Galaxy in the World League of American Football. After the 1997 WLAF season with the Galaxy, DeLoach became secondary coach at the University of North Texas under head coach Darrell Dickey.

Prior to the 2000 season, DeLoach was promoted to defensive coordinator. Under DeLoach's direction, the Mean Green ranked at or near the top of the conference in several defensive categories each year. In 2001 and 2002, the Mean Green defense led the Sun Belt Conference in rushing defense, scoring defense and total defense. Nationally, North Texas was third in scoring defense (14.8 points), ninth in total defense (290.6 yards), 12th in passing defense (171.7) and 26th in rushing defense (118.9) in 2002.

DeLoach then left North Texas to coach the safeties and special teams at the University of California, Los Angeles under head coach Karl Dorrell. He left UCLA after Dorrell was fired in 2007. Soon after, DeLoach was hired by Todd Dodge to replace Ron Mendoza as defensive coordinator of North Texas.
