= List of Louisiana–Monroe Warhawks football seasons =

This is a list of seasons completed by the Louisiana–Monroe Warhawks football team of the National Collegiate Athletic Association (NCAA) Division I Football Bowl Subdivision (FBS). Louisiana–Monroe's first football team was fielded in 1931.

Originally a NJCAA team, what would eventually become Northeast Louisiana University would first begin competing as a 4-year institution in 1951. ULM spent years as a I-AA team in the Southland Conference, including a national championship season in 1987. ULM moved up to Division I-A in 1994, and competed as a football independent for seven season, before joining the Sun Belt Conference in 2001, of which it has been a member since.

== Seasons ==
Statistics correct as of the end of the 2024 college football season

NCAA Division I champions	NCAA Division I FCS champions	Conference champions	Division champions	Bowl eligible	Undefeated season

Year	NCAA Division	Conference	Conference Division	Overall					Conference						Coach	Final Ranking	
Year	NCAA Division	Conference	Conference Division	Games	Win	Loss	Tie	Pct.	Games	Win	Loss	Tie	Pct.	Standing	Coach	AP	Coaches'
1931	NJCAA	NJCAA	N/A	6	4	1	1	.750	0	0	0	0	.000	N/A	J. Paul Kemerer	-	-
1932	NJCAA	NJCAA	N/A	9	0	9	0	.000	0	0	0	0	.000	N/A	J. Paul Kemerer	-	-
1933	NJCAA	NJCAA	N/A	7	2	4	1	.357	0	0	0	0	.000	N/A	J. Paul Kemerer	-	-
1934	NJCAA	NJCAA	N/A	9	5	3	1	.611	0	0	0	0	.000	N/A	James L. Malone	-	-
1935	NJCAA	NJCAA	N/A	8	7	0	1	.938	0	0	0	0	.000	N/A	James L. Malone	-	-
1936	NJCAA	NJCAA	N/A	8	4	3	1	.563	0	0	0	0	.000	N/A	James L. Malone	-	-
1937	NJCAA	NJCAA	N/A	7	6	0	1	.929	0	0	0	0	.000	N/A	James L. Malone	-	-
1938	NJCAA	NJCAA	N/A	11	7	3	1	.682	0	0	0	0	.000	N/A	James L. Malone	-	-
1939	NJCAA	NJCAA	N/A	11	6	4	1	.591	0	0	0	0	.000	N/A	James L. Malone	-	-
1940	NJCAA	NJCAA	N/A	9	6	2	1	.722	0	0	0	0	.000	N/A	James L. Malone	-	-
1941	NJCAA	NJCAA	N/A	8	4	3	1	.563	0	0	0	0	.000	N/A	James L. Malone	-	-
1942	NJCAA	NJCAA	N/A	8	6	2	0	.750	0	0	0	0	.000	N/A	James L. Malone	-	-
1943	NJCAA	NJCAA	N/A	4	2	2	0	.500	0	0	0	0	.000	N/A	James L. Malone	-	-
1944	NJCAA	NJCAA	N/A	5	2	1	2	.600	0	0	0	0	.000	N/A	James L. Malone	-	-
1945	NJCAA	NJCAA	N/A	8	6	2	0	.750	0	0	0	0	.000	N/A	James L. Malone	-	-
1946	NJCAA	NJCAA	N/A	9	2	6	1	.278	0	0	0	0	.000	N/A	James L. Malone	-	-
1947	NJCAA	NJCAA	N/A	9	7	2	0	.778	0	0	0	0	.000	N/A	James L. Malone	-	-
1948	NJCAA	NJCAA	N/A	9	5	3	1	.611	0	0	0	0	.000	N/A	James L. Malone	-	-
1949	NJCAA	NJCAA	N/A	8	2	5	1	.313	0	0	0	0	.000	N/A	James L. Malone	-	-
1950	NJCAA	NJCAA	N/A	10	4	5	1	.450	0	0	0	0	.000	N/A	James L. Malone	-	-
1951	NAIA	NAIA Independent	N/A	8	6	2	0	.250	0	0	0	0	.000	N/A	James L. Malone	-	-
1952	NAIA	NAIA Independent	N/A	9	5	4	0	.556	0	0	0	0	.000	N/A	James L. Malone	-	-
1953	NAIA	Gulf States	N/A	10	1	9	0	.100	0	0	0	0	.000	N/A	James L. Malone	-	-
1954	NAIA	Gulf States	N/A	10	1	8	1	.150	0	0	0	0	.000	N/A	Devone Payne	-	-
1955	NAIA	Gulf States	N/A	10	4	6	0	.400	0	0	0	0	.000	N/A	Devone Payne	-	-
1956	College	Gulf States	N/A	10	7	3	0	.700	0	0	0	0	.000	N/A	Devone Payne	-	-
1957	College	Gulf States	N/A	8	2	6	0	.250	0	0	0	0	.000	N/A	Devone Payne	-	-
1958	College	Gulf States	N/A	9	6	3	0	.667	0	0	0	0	.000	N/A	Jack C. Rowan	-	-
1959	College	Gulf States	N/A	10	2	8	0	.200	0	0	0	0	.000	N/A	Jack C. Rowan	-	-
1960	College	Gulf States	N/A	10	3	7	0	.300	0	0	0	0	.000	N/A	Jack C. Rowan	-	-
1961	College	Gulf States	N/A	10	3	7	0	.300	0	0	0	0	.000	N/A	Jack C. Rowan	-	-
1962	College	Gulf States	N/A	8	2	6	0	.250	0	0	0	0	.000	N/A	Jack C. Rowan	-	-
1963	College	Gulf States	N/A	10	4	6	0	.400	0	0	0	0	.000	N/A	Jack C. Rowan	-	-
1964	College	Gulf States	N/A	8	0	8	0	.000	0	0	0	0	.000	N/A	Dixie B. White	-	-
1965	College	Gulf States	N/A	9	1	8	0	.111	0	0	0	0	.000	N/A	Dixie B. White	-	-
1966	College	Gulf States	N/A	10	7	3	0	.700	0	0	0	0	.000	N/A	Dixie B. White	-	-
1967	College	Gulf States	N/A	10	7	3	0	.700	0	0	0	0	.000	N/A	Dixie B. White	-	-
1968	College	Gulf States	N/A	10	6	4	0	.600	0	0	0	0	.000	N/A	Dixie B. White	-	-
1969	College	Gulf States	N/A	10	1	9	0	.100	0	0	0	0	.000	N/A	Dixie B. White	-	-
1970	College	Gulf States	N/A	9	5	4	0	.556	0	0	0	0	.000	N/A	Dixie B. White	-	-
1971	College	Gulf States	N/A	11	4	6	1	.409	0	0	0	0	.000	N/A	Dixie B. White	-	-
1972	College	College Division Independent	N/A	10	3	7	0	.300	0	0	0	0	.000	N/A	Ollie Keller	-	-
1973	D-II	Division II Independent	N/A	10	3	5	2	.400	0	0	0	0	.000	N/A	Ollie Keller	-	-
1974	D-II	Division II Independent	N/A	10	4	6	0	.400	0	0	0	0	.000	N/A	Ollie Keller	-	-
1975	I-A	Division I-A Independent	N/A	11	4	6	1	.409	0	0	0	0	.000	N/A	Ollie Keller	-	-
1976	I-A	Division I-A Independent	N/A	11	2	9	0	.182	0	0	0	0	.000	N/A	John David Crow	-	-
1977	I-A	Division I-A Independent	N/A	11	2	9	0	.182	0	0	0	0	.000	N/A	John David Crow	-	-
1978	I-A	Division I-A Independent	N/A	11	6	4	1	.591	0	0	0	0	.000	N/A	John David Crow	-	-
1979	I-A	Division I-A Independent	N/A	11	3	8	0	.273	0	0	0	0	.000	N/A	John David Crow	-	-
1980	I-A	Division I-A Independent	N/A	11	7	4	0	.636	0	0	0	0	.000	N/A	John David Crow	-	-
1981	I-A	Division I-A Independent	N/A	11	5	6	0	.455	0	0	0	0	.000	N/A	Pat Collins	-	-
1982	I-AA	Southland	N/A	11	8	3	0	.727	0	0	0	0	.000	N/A	Pat Collins	-	-
1983	I-AA	Southland	N/A	11	8	3	0	.727	0	0	0	0	.000	N/A	Pat Collins	-	-
1984	I-AA	Southland	N/A	11	7	4	0	.636	0	0	0	0	.000	N/A	Pat Collins	-	-
1985	I-AA	Southland	N/A	11	6	5	0	.545	0	0	0	0	.000	N/A	Pat Collins	-	-
1986	I-AA	Southland	N/A	11	5	6	0	.455	0	0	0	0	.000	N/A	Pat Collins	-	-
1987	I-AA	Southland	N/A	15	13	2	0	.867	0	0	0	0	.000	N/A	Pat Collins	-	-
1988	I-AA	Southland	N/A	11	5	6	0	.455	0	0	0	0	.000	N/A	Pat Collins	-	-
1989	I-AA	Southland	N/A	11	4	6	1	.409	0	0	0	0	.000	N/A	Dave Roberts	-	-
1990	I-AA	Southland	N/A	12	7	5	0	.583	0	0	0	0	.000	N/A	Dave Roberts	-	-
1991	I-AA	Southland	N/A	11	7	3	1	.682	0	0	0	0	.000	N/A	Dave Roberts	-	-
1992	I-AA	Southland	N/A	13	10	3	0	.769	0	0	0	0	.000	N/A	Dave Roberts	-	-
1993	I-AA	Southland	N/A	12	9	3	0	.750	0	0	0	0	.000	N/A	Dave Roberts	-	-
1994	I-A	Independent	N/A	11	3	8	0	.273	0	0	0	0	.000	N/A	Ed Zaunbrecher	-	-
1995	I-A	Independent	N/A	11	2	9	0	.182	0	0	0	0	.000	N/A	Ed Zaunbrecher	-	-
1996	I-A	Independent	N/A	11	5	6	0	.455	0	0	0	0	.000	N/A	Ed Zaunbrecher	-	-
1997	I-A	Independent	N/A	12	5	7	0	.417	0	0	0	0	.000	N/A	Ed Zaunbrecher	-	-
1998	I-A	Independent	N/A	11	5	6	0	.455	0	0	0	0	.000	N/A	Ed Zaunbrecher	-	-
1999	I-A	Independent	N/A	11	5	6	0	.455	0	0	0	0	.000	N/A	Bobby Keasler	-	-
2000	I-A	Independent	N/A	11	1	10	0	.091	0	0	0	0	.000	N/A	Bobby Keasler	-	-
2001	I-A	Sun Belt	N/A	11	2	9	0	.182	6	2	4	0	.333	T-4th	Bobby Keasler	-	-
2002	I-A	Sun Belt	N/A	12	3	9	0	.250	6	2	4	0	.333	T-4th	Bobby Keasler/Mike Collins	-	-
2003	I-A	Sun Belt	N/A	12	1	11	0	.083	6	1	5	0	.167	8th	Charlie Weatherbie	-	-
2004	I-A	Sun Belt	N/A	11	5	6	0	.455	6	3	3	0	.500	T-4th	Charlie Weatherbie	-	-
2005	I-A	Sun Belt	N/A	11	5	6	0	.455	7	5	2	0	.714	T-1st	Charlie Weatherbie	-	-
2006	FBS	Sun Belt	N/A	12	4	8	0	.333	7	3	4	0	.429	T-5th	Charlie Weatherbie	-	-
2007	FBS	Sun Belt	N/A	12	6	6	0	.500	7	4	3	0	.571	T-3rd	Charlie Weatherbie	-	-
2008	FBS	Sun Belt	N/A	12	4	8	0	.333	7	3	4	0	.429	T-5th	Charlie Weatherbie	-	-
2009	FBS	Sun Belt	N/A	12	6	6	0	.500	8	5	3	0	.625	T-3rd	Charlie Weatherbie	-	-
2010	FBS	Sun Belt	N/A	12	5	7	0	.417	8	4	4	0	.500	T-4th	Todd Berry	-	-
2011	FBS	Sun Belt	N/A	12	4	8	0	.333	8	3	5	0	.375	6th	Todd Berry		-
2012	FBS	Sun Belt	N/A	13	8	5	0	.615	8	6	2	0	.750	T-2nd	Todd Berry	-	-
2013	FBS	Sun Belt	N/A	12	6	6	0	.500	7	4	3	0	.571	T-3rd	Todd Berry	-	-
2014	FBS	Sun Belt	N/A	12	4	8	0	.333	8	3	5	0	.375	7th	Todd Berry	-	-
2015	FBS	Sun Belt	N/A	13	2	11	0	.150	8	1	7	0	.125	11th	Todd Berry/John Mumford	-	-
2016	FBS	Sun Belt	N/A	12	4	8	0	.333	8	3	5	0	.375	7th	Matt Viator	-	-
2017	FBS	Sun Belt	N/A	12	4	8	0	.333	8	4	4	0	.500	7th	Matt Viator	-	-
2018	FBS	Sun Belt	West	12	6	6	0	.500	8	4	4	0	.500	6th	Matt Viator	-	-
2019	FBS	Sun Belt	West	12	5	7	0	.417	8	4	4	0	.500	6th	Matt Viator	-	-
2020	FBS	Sun Belt	West	10	0	10	0	.000	7	0	7	0	.000	5th	Matt Viator	-	-
2021	FBS	Sun Belt	West	12	4	8	0	.333	8	2	6	0	.250	3rd	Terry Bowden	-	-
2022	FBS	Sun Belt	West	12	4	8	0	.333	8	3	5	0	.375	5th	Terry Bowden	-	-
2023	FBS	Sun Belt	West	12	2	10	0	.167	8	0	8	0	.000	7th	Terry Bowden	-	-
2024	FBS	Sun Belt	West	12	5	7	0	.417	8	3	5	0	.375	T-5th	Bryant Vincent	-	-
Totals				972	417	531	24	.441	170	72	106	0	.404				
