= List of Louisiana–Monroe Warhawks head football coaches =

The Louisiana–Monroe Warhawks football program is a college football team that represents the University of Louisiana at Monroe (ULM) in the NCAA's Sun Belt Conference. The Warhawks have played 758 games during 69 seasons of senior college football. ULM has had 15 head coaches since its first season of senior college football in 1951 at what was then known as Northeast Louisiana State College with the nickname Indians.

Pat Collins is the program's all-time leader in games coached (92), years coached (8), and wins (57) while leading the Indians to two Southland Conference championships and one national championship in what is now the Football Championship Subdivision. Only two other head coaches, Dave Roberts and Charlie Weatherbie, have led the program to conference titles. Roberts remains the team's all-time leader in winning percentage (.661). In terms of winning percentage, the least successful coach in program history was Bobby Keasler, with a record of 8-28 (.222) over four seasons. Todd Berry is the only coach to lead the Warhawks to a winning season and a postseason bowl in the Football Bowl Subdivision. In 2012, Berry's Warhawks finished the season 8–5 and were invited to the Independence Bowl, where they were defeated by Ohio.

Only one coach in program history has been inducted into the College Football Hall of Fame. John David Crow, who was an All-American halfback and Heisman Award winner at Texas A&M University, was inducted as a player in 1976. No ULM coach has received National Coach of the Year honors.

The current coach is Bryant Vincent, who was hired in December 2023.

== Key ==
Key to symbols in coaches list
General		Overall		Conference		Postseason (Note: Although the first Rose Bowl Game was played in 1902, it has been continuously played since the 1916 game, and is recognized as the oldest bowl game by the NCAA. "—" indicates any season prior to 1916 when postseason games were not played.)	
No.	Order of coaches (Note: A running total of the number of head coaches, with coaches who served separate tenures being counted only once. Interim head coaches are represented with "Int" and are not counted in the running total. "—" indicates the team played but either without a coach or no coach is on record. "X" indicates an interim year without play.)	GC	Games coached	CW	Conference wins	PW	Postseason wins
DC	Division championships	OW	Overall wins	CL	Conference losses	PL	Postseason losses
CC	Conference championships	OL	Overall losses	CT	Conference ties	PT	Postseason ties
NC	National championships	OT	Overall ties (Note: Overtime rules in college football were introduced in 1996, making ties impossible in the period since.)	C%	Conference winning percentage		
†	Elected to the College Football Hall of Fame	O%	Overall winning percentage (Note: When computing the win–loss percentage, a tie counts as half a win and half a loss.)				

== Coaches ==
List of head football coaches showing season(s) coached, overall records, conference records, postseason records, championships and selected awards (Note: Statistics correct as of the end of the 2025 NCAA Division I FBS football season.)
No. (Note: A running total of the number of coaches of the Warhawks. Thus, any coach who has two or more separate terms as head coach is counted only once.)	Name	Term	Season(s)	GC	OW	OL	OT	O%	CW (Note: Louisiana-Monroe did not join a conference until 1953 and was an independent from 1971 through 1981 and from 1996 through 2000.)	CL	CT	C%	PW	PL	PT	CCs	NCs	National awards
1	J. Paul Kemerer	1931–1933	3					{{ }}	—	—	—	—	—	—	—	—	—	—
2	James L. Malone	1934–1953	20					{{ }}	—	—	—	—	—	—	—	—	—	—
3	Devone Payne	1954–1957	4	38	15	22	1	0.408	—	—	—	—	—	—	—	—	—	—
4	Jack C. Rowan	1958–1963	6	57	20	37	0	0.351	—	—	—	—	—	—	—	—	—	—
5	Dixie B. White	1964–1971	8	77	31	45	1	0.409	—	—	—	—	—	—	—	—	—	—
6	Ollie Keller	1972–1975	4	41	14	24	3	0.378	—	—	—	—	—	—	—	—	—	—
7	John David Crow	1976–1980	5	55	20	34	1	0.373	—	—	—	—	—	—	—	—	—	—
8	Pat Collins	1981–1988	8	92	57	35	0	0.620	26	14	0	0.650	4	0	0	2	1	—
9	Dave Roberts	1989–1993	5	59	38	19	2	0.661	24	7	2	0.758	1	3	0	2	—	—
10	Ed Zaunbrecher	1994–1998	5	56	20	36	0	0.357	—	—	—	—	—	—	—	—	—	—
11	Bobby Keasler	1999–2002	4	36	8	28	—	0.222	2	4	—	0.333	—	—	—	—	—	—
12	Mike Collins	2002	1	9	3	6	—	0.333	2	4	—	0.333	—	—	—	—	—	—
13	Charlie Weatherbie	2003–2009	7	82	31	51	—	0.378	24	24	—	0.500	—	—	—	1	—	—
14	Todd Berry	2010–2015	6	71	28	43	—	0.394	20	25	—	0.444	0	1	—	—	—	—
15	Matt Viator	2016–2020	5	58	19	39	—	0.328	15	24	—	0.385	0	0	—	—	—	—
16	Terry Bowden	2021–2023	3	36	10	26	—	0.278	5	19	—	0.208	0	0	—	—	—	—
17	Bryant Vincent	2024–present	3	24	8	16	—	0.333	4	12	—	0.250	0	0	—	—	—	—
