= J. Paul Kemerer =

American football coach (?–1959)

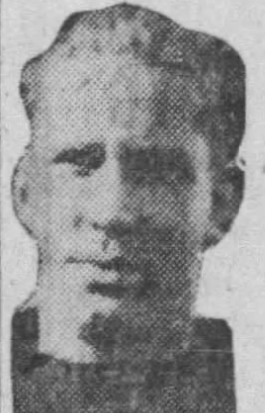

Biographical details
- Born: Duquesne, Pennsylvania, U.S.
- Died: September 7, 1959; Adelphi, Maryland, U.S.
- Education: West Virginia Wesleyan College; Penn State University?

Playing career
- 1922: Penn State
- 1924–1927: West Virginia Wesleyan
- 1928: Ironton Tanks
- Position: Guard

Coaching career (HC unless noted)

Football
- 1930: Penn State (assistant freshmen)
- 1931–1933: Ouachita Junior College
- 1937–1938: Glouster HS (OH)
- c. 1942: Ironton HS (OH) (assistant)

Basketball
- 1931–1934: Ouachita Junior College

Administrative career (AD unless noted)
- 1929–1930: South Point HS (OH)
- 1931–1934: Ouachita Junior College

Head coaching record
- Overall: 6–14–2 (junior college football)

James Paul Kemerer (? – September 7, 1959) was an American college football coach. He was the head football coach for Ouachita Parish Junior College—now known as the University of Louisiana at Monroe—from 1931 to 1933. He also served as the school's basketball coach from 1931 to 1934.

== Playing career ==
Kemerer grew up in Duquesne, Pennsylvania, and attended Pennsylvania State Forest Academy—now known as Pennsylvania State University. As a member of the football team he played guard. During the 1922 season, he was injured and ended up withdrawing from the school. After taking a year off, he enrolled at West Virginia Wesleyan College. Sometime during his sophomore season, he suffered a broken hand. He was voted team captain ahead of his junior season. He is noted as the first Bobcat to receive the honor of captaincy as a junior. The Press & Sun-Bulletin described Kemerer as "cool headed, aggressive, a fighter from the land of zip."

After graduating from West Virginia Wesleyan, Kemerer signed to play semi-professionally for the Ironton Tanks.

== Coaching career ==
Kemerer spent the 1929 school year as the athletic director for South Point High School in South Point, Ohio. After one year, he returned to Penn State, this time as an assistant freshmen coach to Larry Conover. In addition to his on-field coaching role, he also served as a scout for the varsity team.

In 1931, Kemerer was hired as the inaugural head football coach for Ouachita Parish Junior College—now known as the University of Louisiana at Monroe. He also served the school's head basketball coach. He resigned before July 1934 as James L. Malone was named his successor.

From 1937 to 1938, Kemerer served as the head football coach for Glouster High School. In his first season, the team won the conference championship. In 1942, he served as an assistant coach for Ironton High School.

== Personal life ==
On August 30, 1928, Kemerer struck and killed William Runyon of Gallipolis, Ohio, near Gallipolis Airport when Runyon attempted to cross the road. Kemerer tried to swerve to avoid him, but Runyon, startled, moved backward into Kemerer’s path. Runyon sustained a skull fracture, two broken ribs, and unspecified internal injuries before ultimately dying from his injuries at the hospital. Kemerer was immediately arrested after the incident, but no charges were filed against him.

In December 1928, Kemerer married Georgeanna Flower, a fellow staff member at South Point High School, in Columbus, Ohio. Kemerer's mother died in January 1934. He died on September 7, 1959, in Adelphi, Maryland.

== Head coaching record ==
=== Junior college football ===
Year	Team	Overall	Conference	Standing	Bowl/playoffs
Ouachita Junior College Indians (Independent) (1931–1933)
1931	Ouachita Junior College	4–1–1			
1932	Ouachita Junior College	0–9			
1933	Ouachita Junior College	2–4–1			
Ouachita Junior College:		6–14–2			
Total:		6–14–2			
