= FMOL Health/St. Francis Stadium =

Stadium in Monroe, Louisiana

- The Hawk
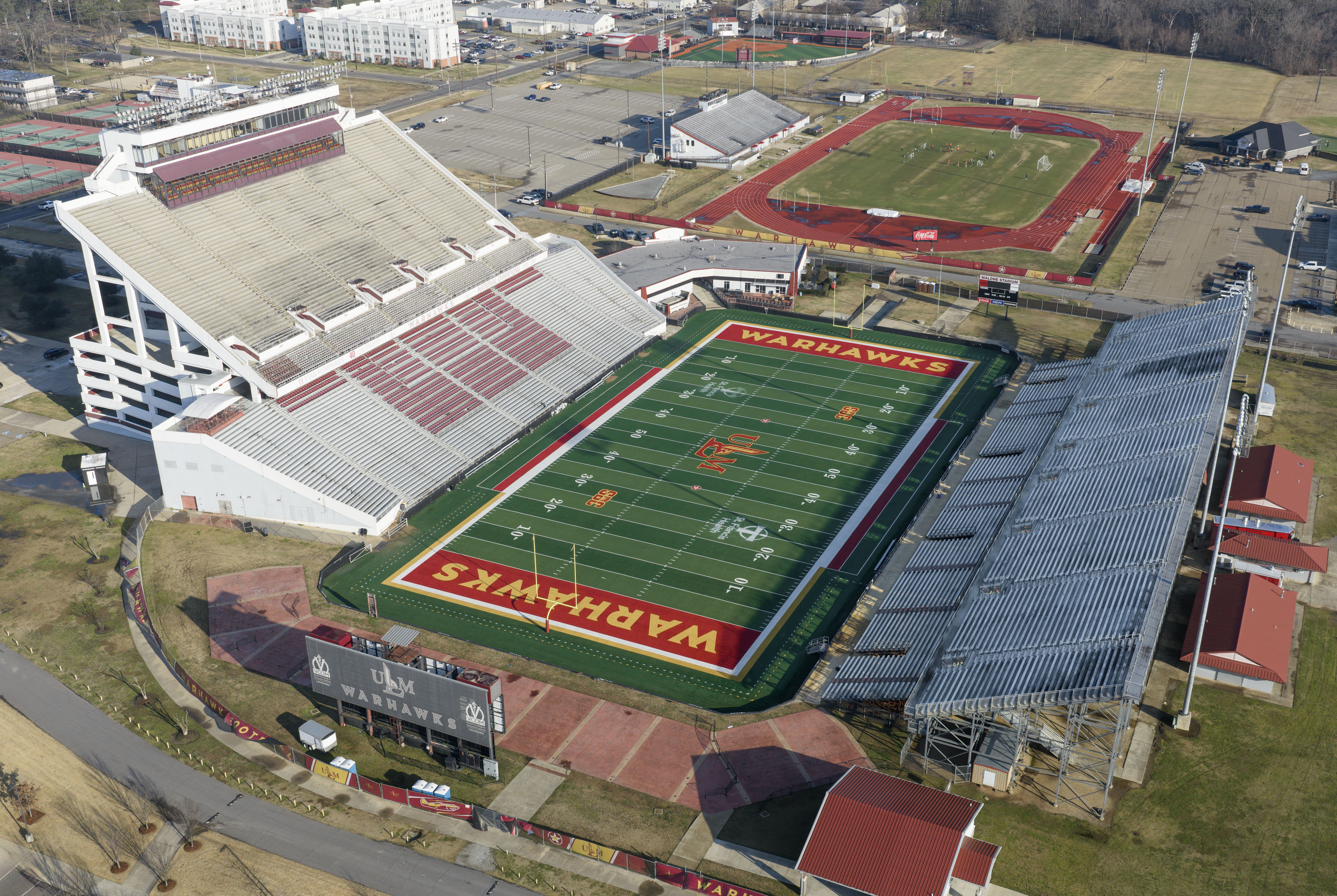
- Aerial view in 2026

- Location in Louisiana Location in the United States
- Location: 514 Warhawk Way; Monroe, Louisiana 71203
- Coordinates: 32°31′51″N 92°3′57″W
- Owner: University of Louisiana at Monroe
- Operator: University of Louisiana at Monroe
- Capacity: 27,617 (2014–present)
- Surface: FieldTurf
- Record attendance: 31,175 (September 21, 2012 vs. Baylor)

Construction
- Groundbreaking: 1977
- Opened: September 16, 1978
- Renovated: 2008, 2014
- Cost: $2.5 million
- Architect: Hugh G. Parker, Jr. Architects (renovations)

Tenants
- Louisiana–Monroe Warhawks football (1978–present)

FMOL Health/St. Francis Stadium is a stadium in Monroe, Louisiana, United States, on the campus of the University of Louisiana at Monroe. It is primarily used for football and is the home field of the ULM Warhawks. The stadium, formerly named Malone Stadium for coach James L. Malone, opened in 1978 and has a seating capacity of 27,617 people.

== History ==
Because Northeast Louisiana University's previous stadium could hold just over 8,000 spectators, the late Mayor W. L. "Jack" Howard pushed for construction of a new football stadium. Malone Stadium, named after the winningest coach in school history James L. Malone, opened on September 16, 1978, with a capacity of 20,000, with the then-Northeast Louisiana Indians beat Arkansas State, 21–13.

It is located across Bayou Desiard from the main campus, the center of the school's athletic facilities. The field runs roughly north-northeast, with an imbalanced grandstand, the west stands being the larger stands. The lower west level is a solid enclosed structure, with the ULM Athletic Training Center enclosed, and the upper level extends much higher, with the press box and luxury boxes located on top. The east side is also decked, with a short first deck wrapping around almost from goalpost to goalpost and another short steel-supported upper deck running the length of the field.

=== Renovations ===
Both sides of seating were extended into each end zone in 1983, increasing the capacity to 23,277. The press box was enlarged in 1991, and capacity decreased to 22,077. In 1993, 8,350 seats were added to the stadium, increasing capacity to its current figure of 30,427.

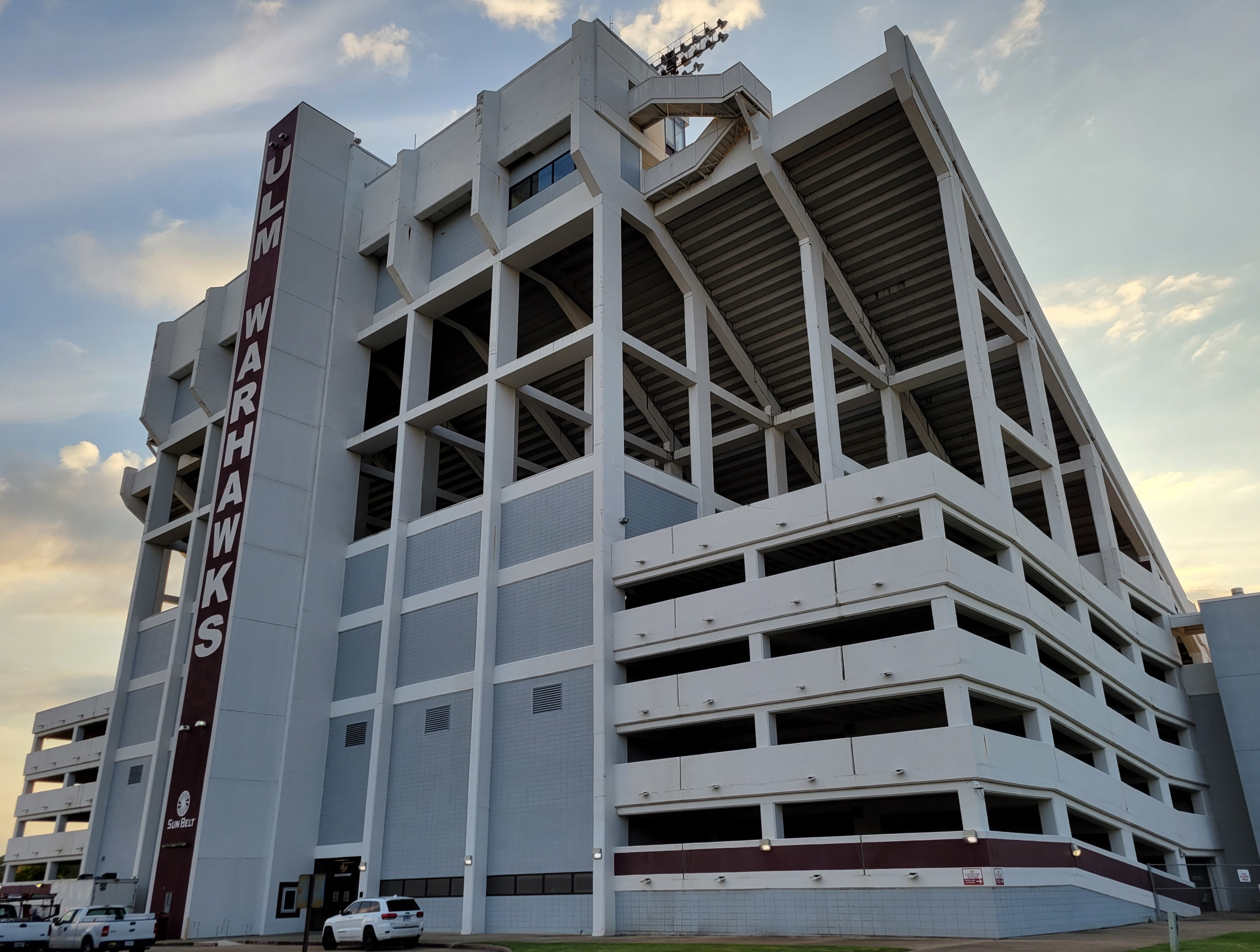
Exterior of home stands

In 2007, ULM excavated the natural grass from Malone Stadium to install ProPlay artificial turf.

In 2011, the university installed a new scoreboard with a HD video display measuring 23 feet high by 48 feet wide (1,104 square feet) and flanked by two low definition video panels for advertisements measuring 16 feet (4.9 m) high by 14 feet (4.3 m) wide. Also, a new sound system was installed in the upper corners of the scoreboard.

A record crowd of 31,175 was reached on September 21, 2012 against the Baylor Bears at the 2012 home opener.

In 2014, JPS Aviation/JPS Equipment Rental paid $450,000 to replace the artificial turf with new FieldTurf and for the field to be named JPS Field at Malone Stadium for the next eight seasons.

A new field house facility was completed in August 2016 at a cost of $4.1 million. The 11,750-square-foot (1,092 m^{2}) building is located in the north end zone, attached to the west grandstand. It features a hall of fame area, locker room, coaches’ offices, and patios overlooking the field.

In 2026, Franciscan Missionaries of Our Lady and St. Francis Hospital in Monroe purchased the naming rights for the stadium.

== Largest crowds ==
The largest crowd to see a Warhawk football game in FMOL Health/St. Francis Stadium was 31,175 on September 21, 2012, when the Warhawks hosted Baylor University. In 2020, there was only 25% of people allowed due to the COVID-19 pandemic.

Rank	Date	Attendance	Opponent	Result
1	September 21, 2012	31,175	Baylor	L, 42–47
2	November 20, 2007	30,101	Grambling State	W, 28–14
3	October 10, 1998	28,725	Louisiana Tech	L, 14–44
4	August 31, 2019	28,327	Grambling State	W, 31–9
5	September 10, 2011	26,532	Grambling State	W, 35–7
6	September 7, 1996	24,842	Minnesota	L, 3–30
7	September 3, 2016	24,718	Southern	W, 38–21
8	October 9, 1982	23,900	Louisiana Tech	L, 10–17
9	September 7, 2013	23,600	Grambling State	W, 48–10
10	November 3, 1984	23,452	Louisiana Tech	W, 12–10

== Gallery ==
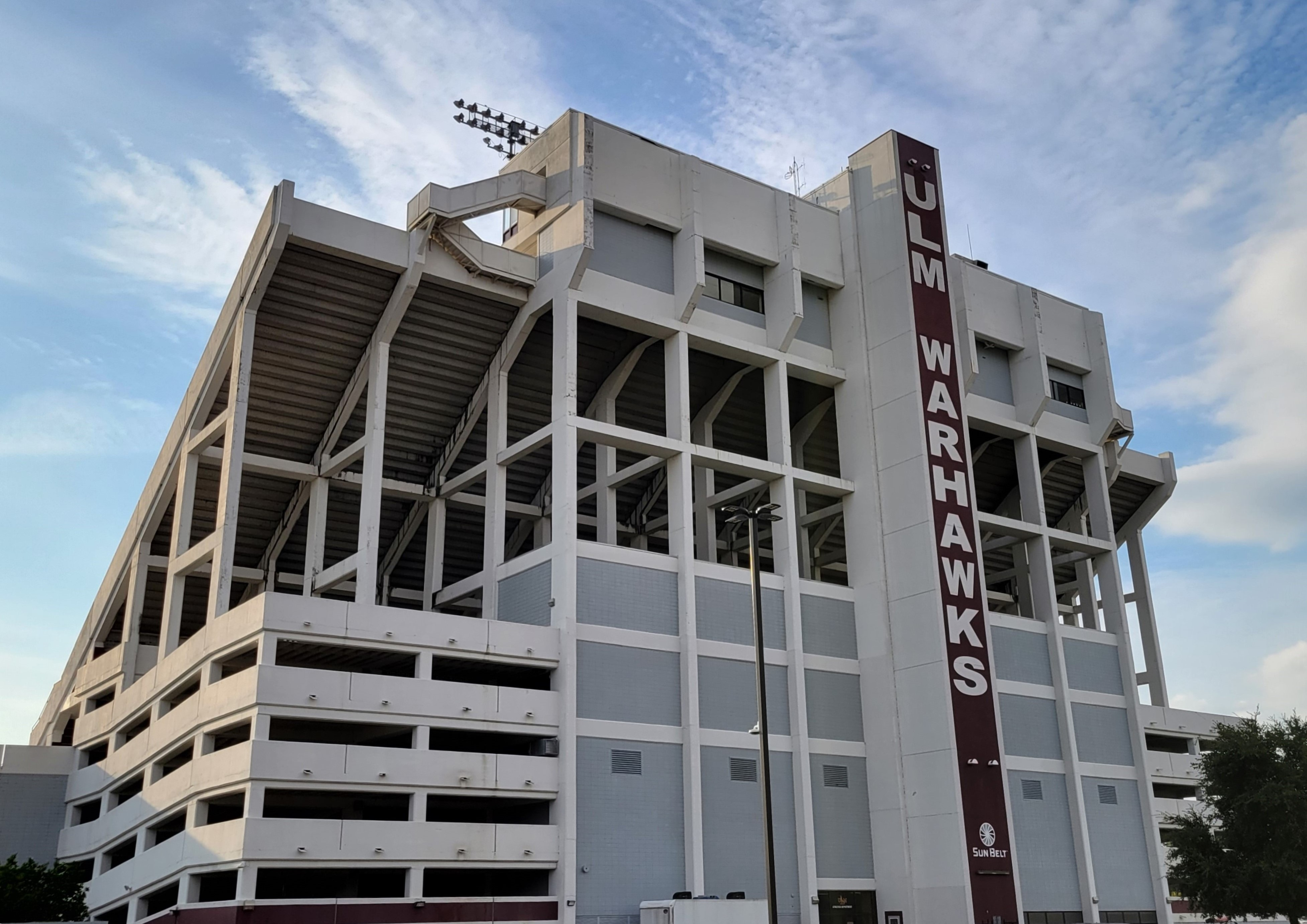
Exterior of Malone Stadium

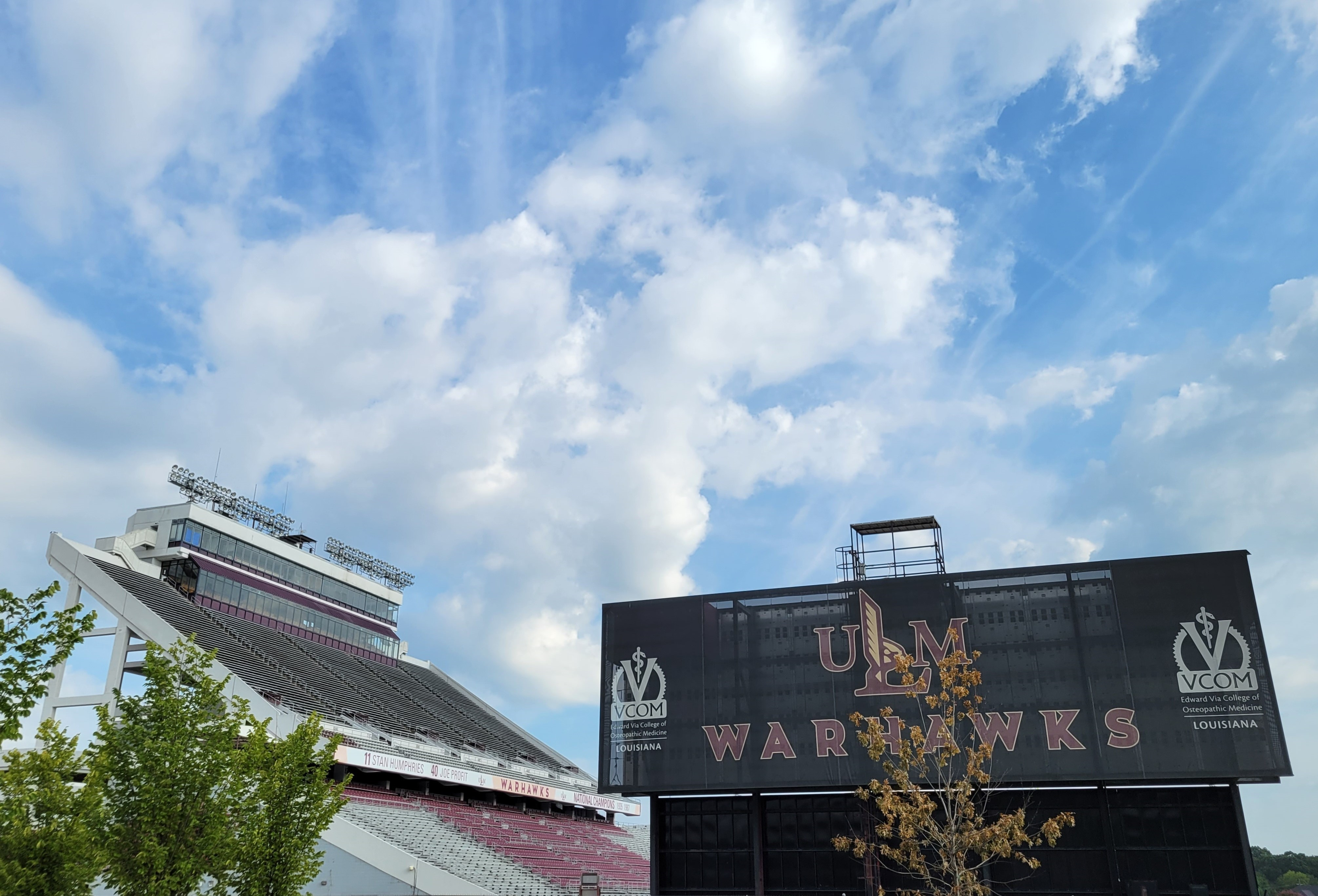
Scoreboard exterior

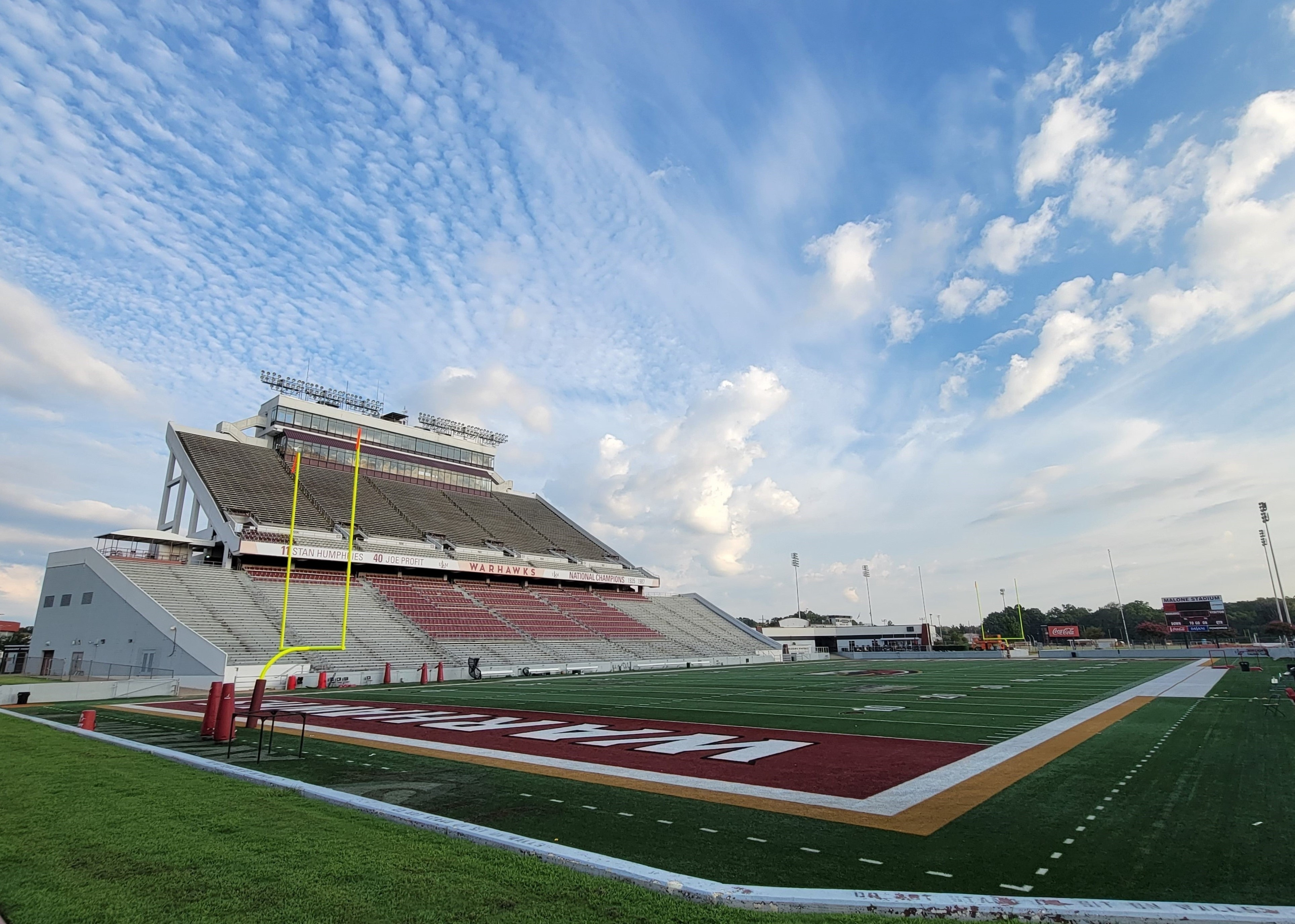
Malone Stadium seating area

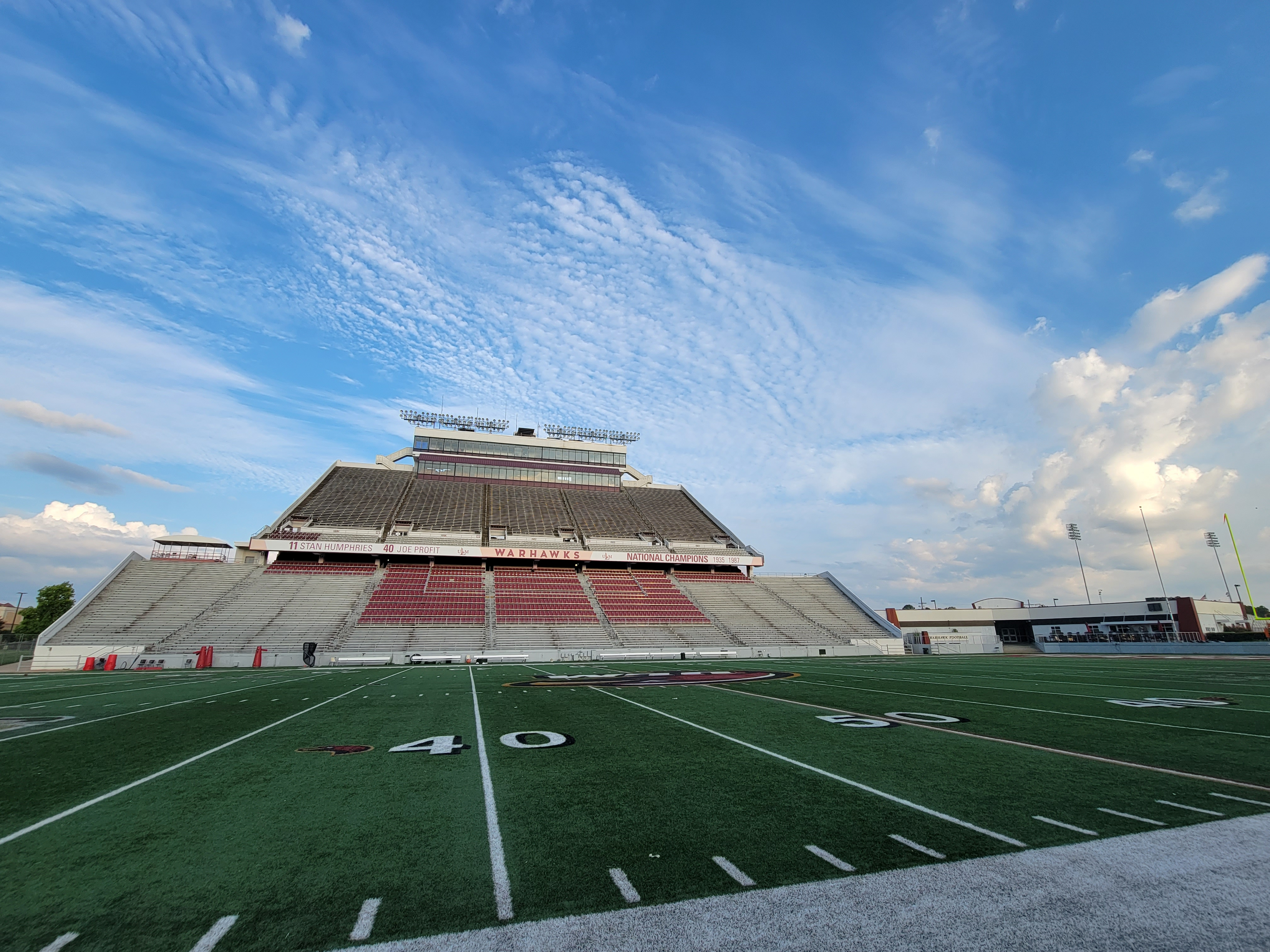
Stadium home stands and football fieldhouse

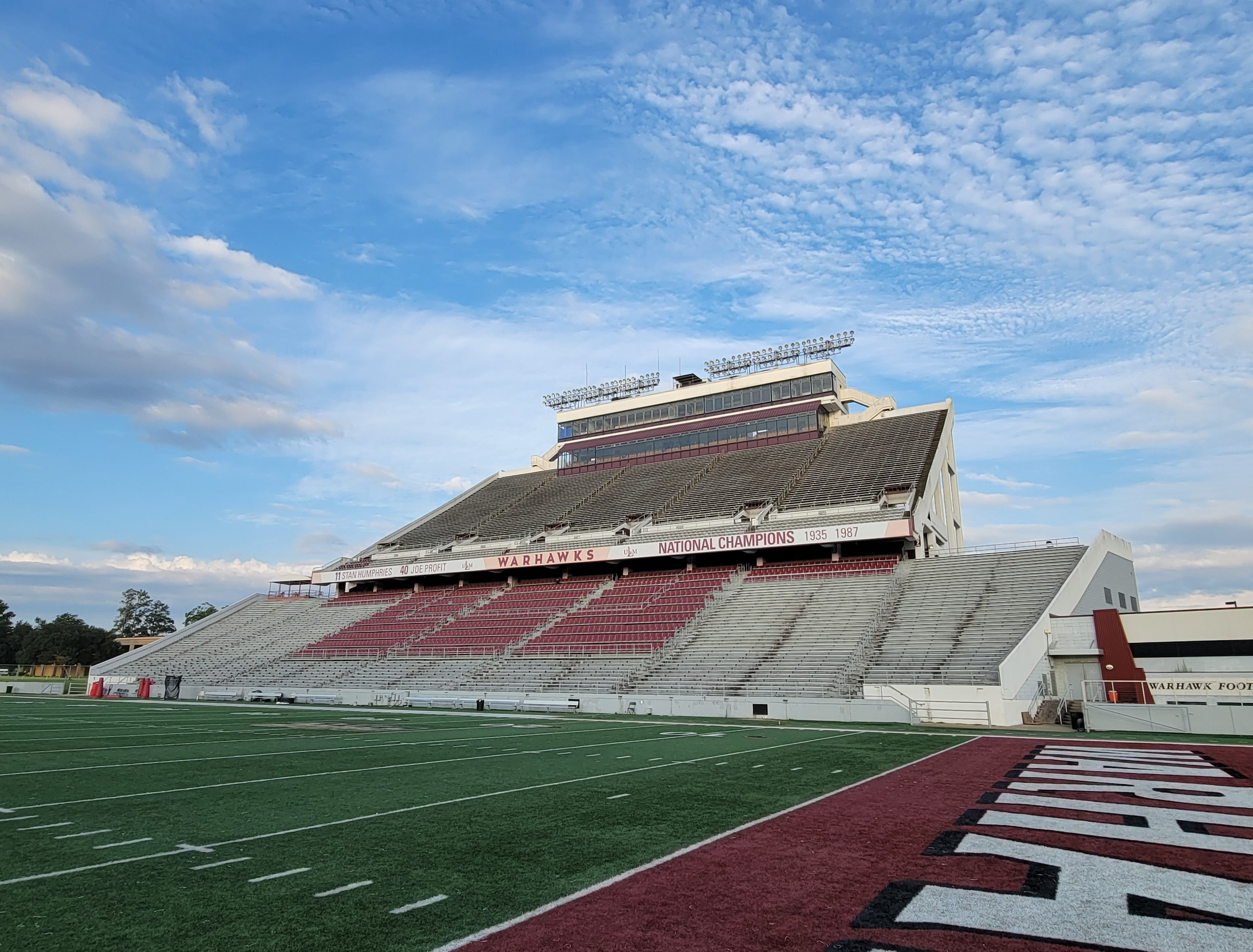
Malone Stadium home stands and JPS Field

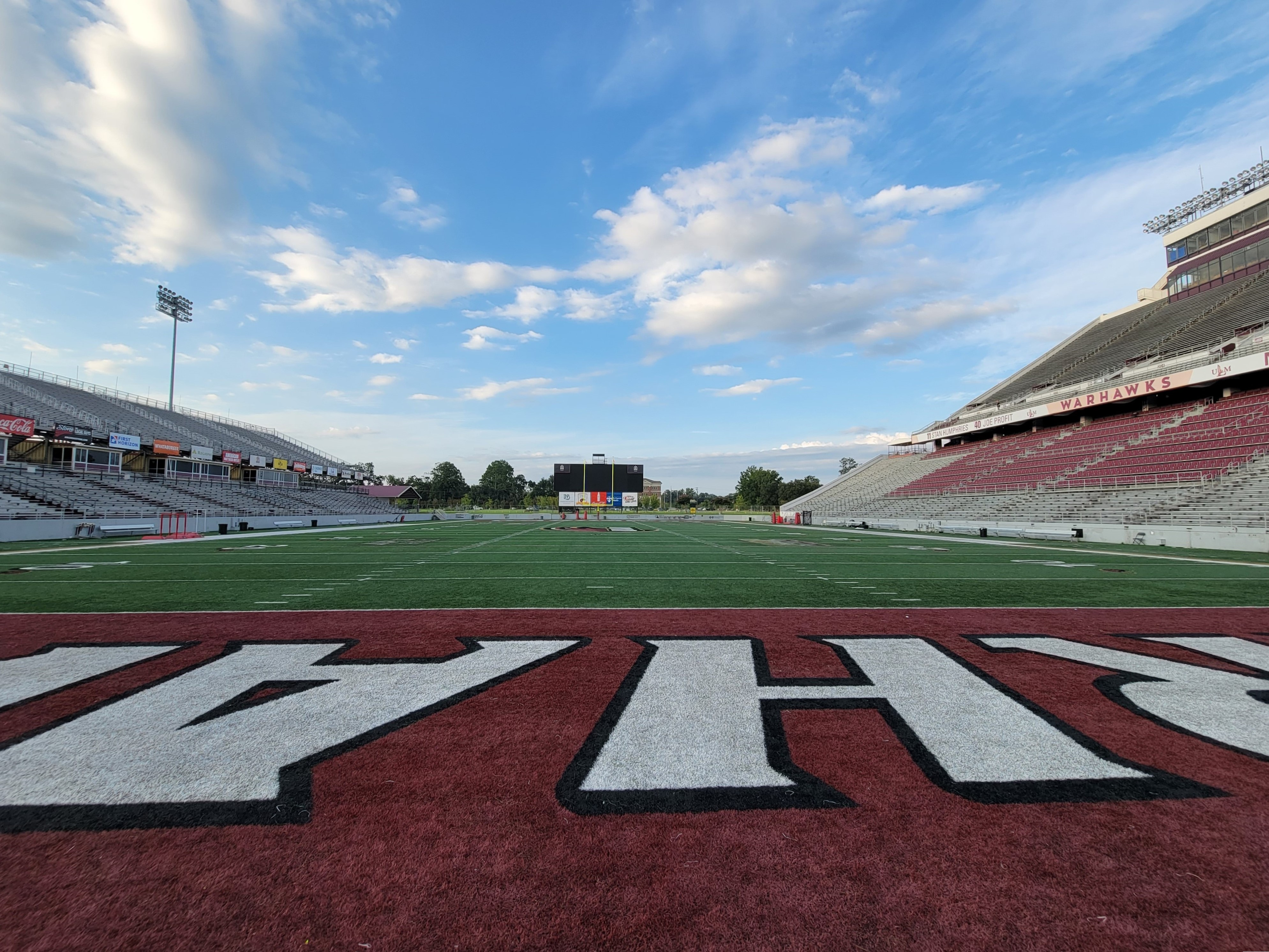
JPS Field in Malone Stadium

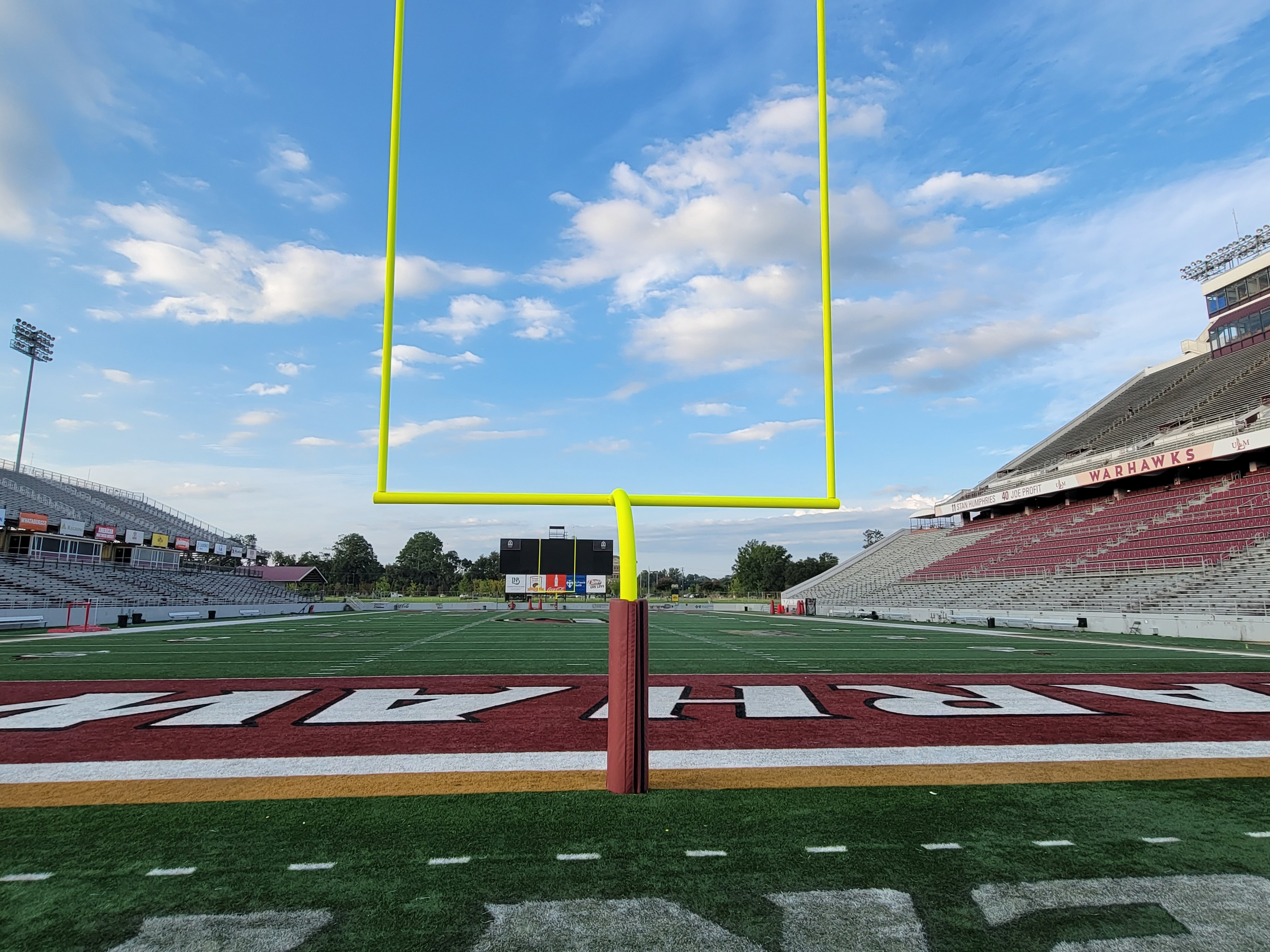
JPS Field goalpost

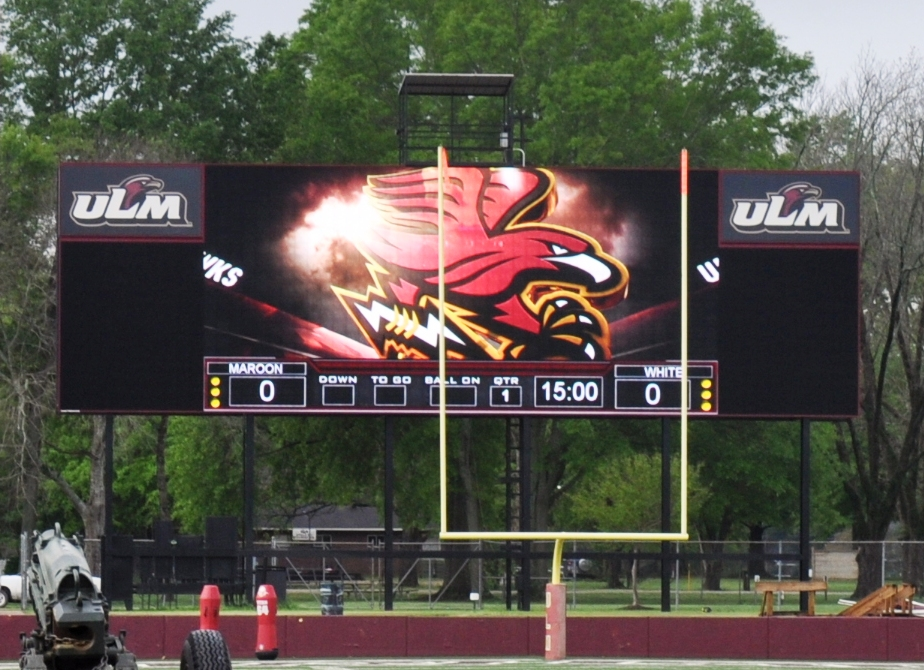
Stadium scoreboard on display

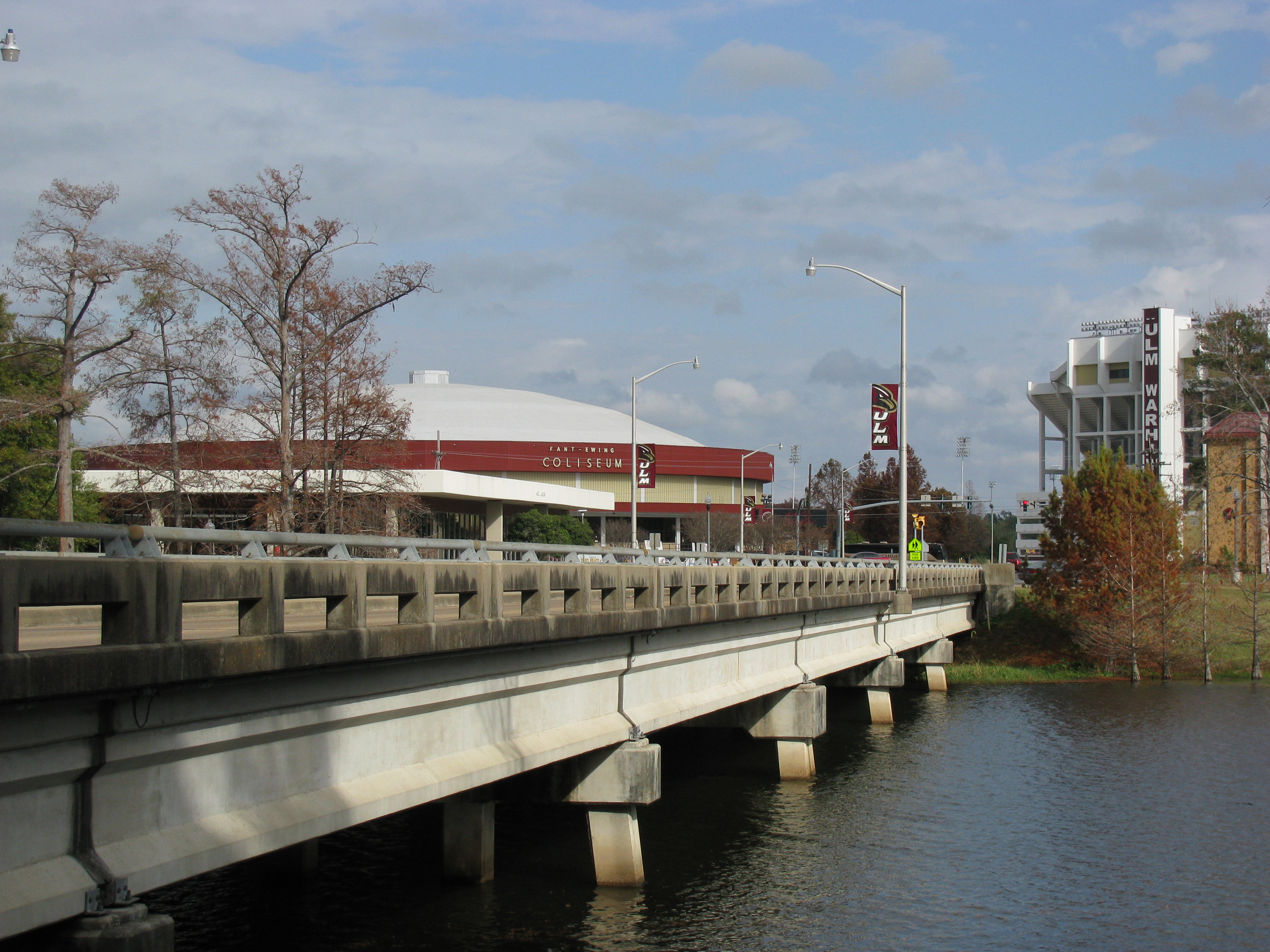
Malone Stadium and Fant–Ewing Coliseum from Bayou Desiard

== See also ==
- List of NCAA Division I FBS football stadiums

Events and tenants
Preceded by Brown Stadium	Home of the Louisiana–Monroe Warhawks football 1978-present	Succeeded by current
