= Louisiana–Monroe Warhawks football junior college seasons =

American college football seasons

The Louisiana–Monroe Warhawks football junior college seasons encompassed the first twenty seasons of football at what is now the University of Louisiana at Monroe from 1931 to 1950. The school was known as Ouachita Parish Junior College from 1931 to 1934; Northeast Center of Louisiana State University from 1934 to 1948; Northeast Junior College of Louisiana State University in 1949; and Northeast Louisiana State College in 1950. During their junior college era, the Indians were led by head coach J. Paul Kemerer from 1931 to 1933 and by James L. Malone, who helmed the Indians for the next 20 seasons, until 1953. The Indians competed as an independent for all but their final season as a junior college in 1950 when they were a member of the Big Six Junior College Conference.

The school opened in fall 1931 and Kemerer served as head coach of the Indians for its duration as Ouachita Junior College. The team played its inaugural season at Forsythe Park before splitting time between Forsythe and Brown Field in 1932 and 1933. During his three years as head coach, Kemerer led Ouachita to an overall record of 6–14–2.

In summer 1934, Ouachita Junior College became Northeast Center of Louisiana State University. That July, Malone was hired as head coach at Northeast Center, and he would go on to remain as head coach of the Indians through their 1953 season. Brown Field served as the home field for Northeast Center through the remainder of their time they competed as a junior college. Highlights of the Malone era included undefeated seasons in 1935 and 1937 and a victory in the 1947 Junior Sugar Bowl. During his 17 years as head coach while classified as a junior college, Malone led Northeast to an overall record of 82–49–12.

The 1950 season was the last for the Indians as a junior college as Northeast Louisiana State College transformed from a two-year junior college to a four-year senior college.

== 1931 ==
1931 Ouachita Junior College Indians football
- Conference: Independent
- Record: 4–1–1
- Head coach: J. Paul Kemerer (1st season)
- Captain: Leo Young
- Home stadium: Forsythe Park

The 1931 Ouachita Junior College Indians football team represented Ouachita Parish Junior College—now known as the University of Louisiana at Monroe—as an independent during the 1931 junior college football season. Led by first-year head coach J. Paul Kemerer, the Indians compiled a record of 4–1–1. Quarterback Leo Young was elected captain of the team. Ouachita Junior College played all six of its games at home, at Forsythe Park in Monroe, Louisiana.

Ouachita Junior College opened for its first classes on September 28, and this made this the first football team fielded by the junior college. Kemerer came to Ouachita after he served as an assistant coach at Penn State.

Schedule

Date	Time	Opponent	Site	Result	Source
October 10	7:45 p.m.	Louisiana College freshmen	Forsythe Park; Monroe, LA	W 20–0	
October 17	7:45 p.m.	El Dorado JC (AR)	Forsythe Park; Monroe, LA	W 24–0	
October 23	7:45 p.m.	Millsaps B team	Forsythe Park; Monroe, LA	W 7–6	
October 31		Mississippi College B team	Forsythe Park; Monroe, LA	W 13–12	
November 6	7:45 p.m.	Southeastern Louisiana	Forsythe Park; Monroe, LA	L 0–6	
November 14		Centenary freshmen	Forsythe Park; Monroe, LA	T 0–0	
All times are in Central time

== 1932 ==
1932 Ouachita Junior College Indians football
- Conference: Independent
- Record: 0–9
- Head coach: J. Paul Kemerer (2nd season)
- Home stadium: Brown Field, Forsythe Park

The 1932 Ouachita Junior College Indians football team represented Ouachita Parish Junior College—now known as the University of Louisiana at Monroe—as an independent during the 1932 junior college football season. Led by second-year head coach J. Paul Kemerer, the Indians compiled a record of 0–9.

Schedule

Date	Time	Opponent	Site	Result	Attendance	Source
September 30		at Marshall (TX)	Marshall, TX	L 7–19		
October 7	2:30 p.m.	Loyola (LA) freshmen	New stadium; Monroe, LA	L 6–7	2,500	
October 12	8:00 p.m.	Centenary freshmen	Forsythe Park; Monroe, LA	L 0–7		
October 21		at Stephen F. Austin	Nacogdoches, TX	L 0–13		
October 28		at Lon Morris	Jacksonville, TX	L 0–7		
November 4		at Southeastern Louisiana	Hammond, LA	L 0–20		
November 11	2:00 p.m.	LSU freshmen	Brown Field; Monroe, LA	L 0–49		
November 17		at Texarkana	Texarkana, AR	L 0–92		
November 24	2:00 p.m.	Little Rock	Brown Field; Monroe, LA	L 0–6		
All times are in Central time

== 1933 ==
1933 Ouachita Junior College Indians football
- Conference: Independent
- Record: 2–4–1
- Head coach: J. Paul Kemerer (3rd season)
- Home stadium: Brown Field, Forsythe Park

The 1933 Ouachita Junior College Indians football team represented Ouachita Parish Junior College—now known as the University of Louisiana at Monroe—as an independent during the 1933 junior college football season. Led by J. Paul Kemerer in his third and final season as head coach, the Indians compiled a record of 2–4–1.

Schedule

Date	Opponent	Site	Result	Source
October 9	at Centenary freshmen	Centenary Stadium; Shreveport, LA	L 0–7	
October 13	Louisiana College freshmen	Brown Field; Monroe, LA	L 0–6	
October 20	Marshall (TX)	Brown Field; Monroe, LA	L 0–21	
October 28	Lon Morris	Brown Field; Monroe, LA	T 0–0	
November 4	Marion CCC Camp	Forsythe Park; Monroe, LA	W 31–0	
November 17	at Little Rock	Little Rock, AR	L 0–16	
November 24	Jena CCC Camp	Forsythe Park; Monroe, LA	W 19–0	

== 1934 ==
1934 Northeast Center Indians football
- Conference: Independent
- Record: 5–3–1
- Head coach: James L. Malone (1st season)
- Home stadium: Brown Field

The 1934 Northeast Center Indians football team represented Northeast Center of Louisiana State University—now known as the University of Louisiana at Monroe—as an independent during the 1934 junior college football season. Led by first-year head coach James L. Malone, the Indians compiled a record of 5–3–1.

In June, the Louisiana Louisiana House of Representatives Education Committee made a favorable recommendation for Ouachita Junior College to become the Northeast Center of Louisiana State University (LSU). On July 11, Malone was formally announced as head coach of the Indians. Prior to being hired at the Northeast Center, Malone served as freshmen coach at LSU in 1933.

Schedule

Date	Opponent	Site	Result	Attendance	Source
September 28	Copiah–Lincoln	Brown Field; Monroe, LA	T 0–0		
October 5	Pearl River	Brown Field; Monroe, LA	W 7–0		
October 11	at Marshall (TX)	Fair Park Stadium; Marshall, TX	L 7–22	2,500	
October 19	Southeastern Louisiana	Brown Field; Monroe, LA	W 19–6		
October 26	at Lon Morris	Jacksonville, TX	W 20–6		
November 2	Barksdale Field	Brown Field; Monroe, LA	W 19–0		
November 12	Louisiana Tech freshmen	Brown Field; Monroe, LA	L 0–13	2,000	
November 17	vs. Ouachita Baptist	Rowland Field; El Dorado, AR	L 0–6	2,000	
November 29	Little Rock	Brown Field; Monroe, LA	W 19–6		

== 1935 ==
1935 Northeast Center Indians football
- Conference: Independent
- Record: 8–0
- Head coach: James L. Malone (2nd season)
- Home stadium: Brown Field

The 1935 Northeast Center Indians football team represented Northeast Center of Louisiana State University—now known as the University of Louisiana at Monroe—as an independent during the 1935 junior college football season. Led by second-year head coach James L. Malone, the Indians compiled a record of perfect 8–0 record, outscoring opponents 180 to 6. The Indians turned down an offer to play a postseason game against Amarillo Junior College on December 24, in Amarillo, Texas.

Schedule

Date	Time	Opponent	Site	Result	Source
September 27	8:00 p.m.	Monticello A&M	Brown Field; Monroe, LA	W 31–0	
October 4	8:00 p.m.	Henderson State	Brown Field; Monroe, LA	W 13–0	
October 11	8:00 p.m.	Marshall (TX)	Brown Field; Monroe, LA	W 12–0	
October 17	8:00 p.m.	Arkansas State Teachers	Brown Field; Monroe, LA	W 21–0	
November 1	2:00 p.m.	at Ouachita Baptist	Williams Stadium; Arkadelphia, AR	W 6–0	
November 15	8:00 p.m.	at Southeastern Louisiana	Southeastern athletic field; Hammond, LA	W 16–6	
November 22	8:00 p.m.	Arkansas College^{†}	Brown Field; Monroe, LA	W 75–0	
November 26	2:30 p.m.	Lon Morris	Brown Field; Monroe, LA	W 6–0	
^{†}Homecoming; All times are in Central time

== 1936 ==
1936 Northeast Center Indians football
- Conference: Independent
- Record: 4–4–1
- Head coach: James L. Malone (3rd season)
- Home stadium: Brown Field

The 1936 Northeast Center Indians football team represented Northeast Center of Louisiana State University—now known as the University of Louisiana at Monroe—as an independent during the 1936 junior college football season. Led by third-year head coach James L. Malone, the Indians compiled a record of 4–4–1, outscoring opponents 125 to 86.

Schedule

Date	Time	Opponent	Site	Result	Attendance	Source
September 22		Centenary sophomores	Brown Field; Monroe, LA	W 13–12		
October 1		Southeastern Louisiana	Brown Field; Monroe, LA	L 0–22	6,000	
October 9		Marshall (TX)	Brown Field; Monroe, LA	W 19–0		
October 16	8:00 p.m.	at Arkansas State Teachers	Young Memorial Stadium; Conway, AR	L 6–27		
October 23		at Arkansas A&M	Monticello, AR	L 0–6		
October 30		Copiah–Lincoln	Brown Field; Monroe, LA	T 7–7		
November 13		at Henderson State	Arkadelphia, AR	L 26–0		
November 20		Ouachita Baptist	Brown Field; Monroe, LA	W 7–12		
December 4	2:00 p.m.	Southwest Mississippi	Brown Field; Monroe, LA	W 47–0		
All times are in Central time

== 1937 ==
1937 Northeast Center Indians football
- Conference: Independent
- Record: 7–0–1
- Head coach: James L. Malone (4th season)
- Home stadium: Brown Field

The 1937 Northeast Center Indians football team represented Northeast Center of Louisiana State University—now known as the University of Louisiana at Monroe—as an independent during the 1937 junior college football season. Led by fourth-year head coach James L. Malone, the Indians compiled a record of 7–0–1, outscoring opponents 303 to 20.

Schedule

Date	Opponent	Site	Result	Attendance	Source
September 24	Arkansas A&M	Brown Field; Monroe, LA	W 111–0		
October 1	Tennessee Junior College	Brown Field; Monroe, LA	W 59–0		
October 8	Kilgore	Brown Field; Monroe, LA	W 41–6	4,500	
October 15	Marshall (TX)	Brown Field; Monroe, LA	W 27–6		
October 21	at Texarkana	Grim Stadium; Texarkana, TX	W 14–0	2,000	
October 29	Copiah–Lincoln	Brown Field; Monroe, LA	W 30–0		
November 5	at Southeastern Louisiana	Strawberry Stadium; Hammond, LA	T 0–0		
November 12	Henderson State	Brown Field; Monroe, LA	W 21–8		

== 1938 ==
1938 Northeast Center Indians football
- Conference: Independent
- Record: 7–3–1
- Head coach: James L. Malone (5th season)
- Home stadium: Brown Field

The 1938 Northeast Center Indians football team represented Northeast Center of Louisiana State University—now known as the University of Louisiana at Monroe—as an independent during the 1938 junior college football season. Led by fifth-year head coach James L. Malone, the Indians compiled a record of 7–3–1, outscoring opponents 156 to 68.

Schedule

Date	Opponent	Site	Result	Attendance	Source
September 17	at Centenary freshmen	Centenary Stadium; Shreveport, LA	W 26–0		
September 23	Oklahoma Military Academy	Brown Field; Monroe, LA	L 0–14		
September 29	Marshall (TX)	Brown Field; Monroe, LA	W 22–7		
October 6	at Kilgore	Kilgore Athletic Stadium; Kilgore, TX	L 12–14	4,000	
October 14	LSU freshmen	Brown Field; Monroe, LA	L 6–13		
October 20	vs. Henderson State	Hope High School Stadium; Hope, AR	W 18–7	3,000	
October 27	Copiah–Lincoln	Brown Field; Monroe, LA	W 25–6		
November 4	Southeastern Louisiana	Brown Field; Monroe, LA	T 0–0		
November 11	Pensacola NAS	Brown Field; Monroe, LA	W 13–0		
November 18	at Arkansas A&M	Monticello, AR	W 19–0		
November 24	Northern Illinois State	Brown Field; Monroe, LA	W 15–7		

== 1939 ==
1939 Northeast Center Indians football
- Conference: Independent
- Record: 6–4–1
- Head coach: James L. Malone (6th season)
- Home stadium: Brown Field

The 1939 Northeast Center Indians football team represented Northeast Center of Louisiana State University—now known as the University of Louisiana at Monroe—as an independent during the 1939 junior college football season. Led by sixth-year head coach James L. Malone, the Indians compiled a record of 6–4–1, outscoring opponents 120 to 69.

Schedule

Date	Opponent	Site	Result	Attendance	Source
September 18	at Centenary freshmen	Centenary Stadium; Shreveport, LA	T 0–0		
September 22	Murray State (OK)	Brown Field; Monroe, LA	W 18–0		
September 29	Tulane freshmen	Brown Field; Monroe, LA	W 14–0		
October 6	LSU freshmen	Brown Field; Monroe, LA	L 7–12		
October 13	at Ouachita Baptist	Williams Stadium; Arkadelphia, AR	L 6–12		
October 20	Henderson State	Brown Field; Monroe, LA	W 20–0		
October 27	Copiah–Lincoln	Brown Field; Monroe, LA	W 22–0		
November 11	at Pensacola NAS	Air Station Field; Pensacola, FL	W 24–0		
November 17	at Southeastern Louisiana	Strawberry Stadium; Hammond, LA	W 2–0		
November 23	at Arkansas Tech	Thone Stadium; Russellville, AR	L 0–27	2,000	
November 30	East Central (MS)	Brown Field; Monroe, LA	L 6–19		

== 1940 ==
1940 Northeast Center Indians football
- Conference: Independent
- Record: 6–2–1
- Head coach: James L. Malone (7th season)
- Home stadium: Brown Field

The 1940 Northeast Center Indians football team represented Northeast Center of Louisiana State University—now known as the University of Louisiana at Monroe—as an independent during the 1940 junior college football season. Led by seventh-year head coach James L. Malone, the Indians compiled a record of 6–2–1, outscoring opponents 166 to 72.

Schedule

Date	Opponent	Site	Result	Source
September 20	Copiah–Lincoln	Brown Field; Monroe, LA	W 26–0	
September 27	Kilgore	Brown Field; Monroe, LA	T 7–7	
October 11	Ouachita Baptist	Brown Field; Monroe, LA	W 9–0	
October 18	at Henderson State	Arkadelphia, AR	W 20–18	
October 24	at Centenary freshmen	Centenary Stadium; Shreveport, LA	W 47–0	
November 3	at Pensacola NAS	Air Station Field; Pensacola, FL	W 14–0	
November 15	Arkansas Tech	Brown Field; Monroe, LA	L 6–27	
November 21	Southeastern Louisiana	Brown Field; Monroe, LA	L 13–20	
November 29	East Central (MS)^{†}	Brown Field; Monroe, LA	W 26–0	
^{†}Homecoming

== 1941 ==
1941 Northeast Center Indians football
- Conference: Independent
- Record: 4–3–1
- Head coach: James L. Malone (8th season)
- Home stadium: Brown Field

The 1941 Northeast Center Indians football team represented Northeast Center of Louisiana State University—now known as the University of Louisiana at Monroe—as an independent during the 1941 junior college football season. Led by eighth-year head coach James L. Malone, the Indians compiled a record of 4–3–1, outscoring opponents 106 to 58.

Schedule

Date	Opponent	Site	Result	Attendance	Source
September 19	Copiah–Lincoln	Brown Field; Monroe, LA	W 13–6		
September 25	at Kilgore	Kilgore Athletic Stadium; Kilgore, TX	L 0–14	5,000	
October 3	Northwest Mississippi	Brown Field; Monroe, LA	W 25–6		
October 18	Henderson State	Brown Field; Monroe, LA	T 0–0		
October 24	Pensacola NAS	Brown Field; Monroe, LA	L 6–20		
November 7	Hinds^{†}	Brown Field; Monroe, LA	W 24–0	4,500	
November 15	at Southeastern Louisiana	Strawberry Stadium; Hammond, LA	L 6–7		
November 27	East Central (MS)	Brown Field; Monroe, LA	W 32–12		
^{†}Homecoming

== 1942 ==
1942 Northeast Center Indians football
- Conference: Independent
- Record: 5–3
- Head coach: James L. Malone (9th season)
- Home stadium: Brown Field

The 1942 Northeast Center Indians football team represented Northeast Center of Louisiana State University—now known as the University of Louisiana at Monroe—as an independent during the 1942 junior college football season. Led by ninth-year head coach James L. Malone, the Indians compiled a record of 5–3, outscoring opponents 161 to 110.

At the conclusion of the season, Coach Malone declined a bid to play a postseason game against Paris Junior College, who were the Texas junior college champions.

Schedule

Date	Opponent	Site	Result	Source
September 26	Kilgore	Brown Field; Monroe, LA	L 0–7	
October 3	LSU 'B' team	Brown Field; Monroe, LA	L 13–21	
October 10	Copiah–Lincoln	Brown Field; Monroe, LA	W 37–0	
October 24	Southeastern Louisiana	Brown Field; Monroe, LA	W 13–0	
October 31	Tulane freshmen	Brown Field; Monroe, LA	W 26–7	
November 6	Lamar	Brown Field; Monroe, LA	W 19–13	
November 20	at Ouachita Baptist	Williams Stadium; Arkadelphia, AR	L 0–62	
November 26	East Central (MS)	Brown Field; Monroe, LA	W 43–0	

== 1943 ==
1943 Northeast Center Indians football
- Conference: Independent
- Record: 2–2
- Head coach: James L. Malone (10th season)
- Home stadium: Brown Field

The 1943 Northeast Center Indians football team represented Northeast Center of Louisiana State University—now known as the University of Louisiana at Monroe—as an independent during the 1943 junior college football season. Led by tenth-year head coach James L. Malone, the Indians compiled a record of 2–2, and were outscored by opponents 39 to 79.

Schedule

Date	Opponent	Site	Result	Source
October 16	Camp Livingston	Brown Field; Monroe, LA	W 19–6	
October 24	at LSU ASTU	Tiger Stadium; Baton Rouge, LA	L 0–52	
November 13	Camp Claiborne	Brown Field; Monroe, LA	W 13–0	
November 27	Selman Field	Brown Field; Monroe, LA	L 7–21	

== 1944 ==
1944 Northeast Center Indians football
- Conference: Independent
- Record: 2–1–2
- Head coach: James L. Malone (11th season)
- Home stadium: Brown Field

The 1944 Northeast Center Indians football team represented Northeast Center of Louisiana State University—now known as the University of Louisiana at Monroe—as an independent during the 1944 junior college football season. Led by 11th-year head coach James L. Malone, the Indians compiled a record of 2–1–2, outscoring opponents 45 to 33.

Schedule

Date	Opponent	Site	Result	Source
October 19	Louisiana College	Brown Field; Monroe, LA	T 0–0	
November 3	at Louisiana College	Alumni Field; Pineville, LA	W 12–7	
November 10	Copiah–Lincoln	Brown Field; Monroe, LA	L 7–12	
November 16	Hinds	Brown Field; Monroe, LA	T 7–7	
November 23	Pearl River	Brown Field; Monroe, LA	W 19–7	

== 1945 ==
1945 Northeast Center Indians football
- Conference: Independent
- Record: 6–2
- Head coach: James L. Malone (12th season)
- Home stadium: Brown Field

The 1945 Northeast Center Indians football team represented Northeast Center of Louisiana State University—now known as the University of Louisiana at Monroe—as an independent during the 1945 junior college football season. Led by 12th-year head coach James L. Malone, the Indians compiled a record of 6–2, outscoring opponents 126 to 46.

Schedule

Date	Opponent	Site	Result	Source
September 27	Henderson State	Brown Field; Monroe, LA	W 12–0	
October 5	Merchant Marine Cadet School (MS)	Brown Field; Monroe, LA	W 13–0	
October 11	at Arkansas Tech	Thone Stadium; Russellville, AR	L 0–14	
October 18	McNeese	Brown Field; Monroe, LA	W 38–6	
October 25	Copiah–Lincoln	Brown Field; Monroe, LA	W 26–0	
November 1	at McNeese	Lake Charles, LA	W 12–0	
November 16	Holmes	Brown Field; Monroe, LA	W 25–14	
November 20	Selman Field	Brown Field; Monroe, LA	L 0–12	

== 1946 ==
1946 Northeast Center Indians football
- Conference: Independent
- Record: 2–7
- Head coach: James L. Malone (13th season)
- Home stadium: Brown Field

The 1946 Northeast Center Indians football team represented Northeast Center of Louisiana State University—now known as the University of Louisiana at Monroe—as an independent during the 1946 junior college football season. Led by 13th-year head coach James L. Malone, the Indians compiled a record of 2–7, and were outscored by opponents 76 to 124.

Schedule

Date	Opponent	Site	Result	Source
September 26	Merchant Marine Cadet School (MS)	Brown Field; Monroe, LA	W 45–0	
October 5	at Kilgore	Kilgore Athletic Stadium; Kilgore, TX	L 0–13	
October 11	Ole Miss "B" team	Brown Field; Monroe, LA	L 0–13	
October 18	McNeese	Brown Field; Monroe, LA	L 0–16	
October 26	Copiah–Lincoln	Brown Field; Monroe, LA	L 6–12	
November 1	at McNeese	Lake Charles, LA	L 6–31	
November 8	Magnolia A&M^{†}	Brown Field; Monroe, LA	W 19–0	
November 21	Arkansas Tech	Brown Field; Monroe, LA	L 0–6	
November 30	at Hardin	Coyote Stadium; Wichita Falls, TX	L 0–33	
^{†}Homecoming

== 1947 ==
1947 Northeast Center Indians football

Junior Sugar Bowl, W 33–13 vs. Hillsboro (TX)
- Conference: Independent
- Record: 7–2
- Head coach: James L. Malone (14th season)
- Home stadium: Brown Field

The 1947 Northeast Center Indians football team represented Northeast Center of Louisiana State University—now known as the University of Louisiana at Monroe—as an independent during the 1947 junior college football season. Led by 14th-year head coach James L. Malone, the Indians compiled a record of 7–2, outscoring opponents 206 to 65. At the conclusion of the regular season, they defeated Hillsboro (TX) in the Junior Sugar Bowl.

Schedule

Date	Opponent	Site	Result	Attendance	Source
September 18	Northwest Mississippi	Brown Field; Monroe, LA	W 19–13		
September 26	Henderson County	Brown Field; Monroe, LA	W 29–0		
October 4	Kilgore	Brown Field; Monroe, LA	L 14–7	3,000	
October 17	Arkansas College	Brown Field; Monroe, LA	W 34–0		
October 24	Copiah–Lincoln	Brown Field; Monroe, LA	W 26–0		
October 31	Tennessee Junior College	Brown Field; Monroe, LA	W 32–0		
November 8	at Magnolia A&M	Columbia Stadium; Magnolia, AR	L 7–19		
November 27	Livingston State	Brown Field; Monroe, LA	W 19–6		
December 12	Hillsboro (TX)	Brown Field; Monroe, LA (Little Sugar Bowl)	W 33–13		

== 1948 ==
1948 Northeast Center Indians football
- Conference: Independent
- Record: 5–3–1
- Head coach: James L. Malone (15th season)
- Home stadium: Brown Field

The 1948 Northeast Center Indians football team represented Northeast Center of Louisiana State University—now known as the University of Louisiana at Monroe—as an independent during the 1948 junior college football season. Led by 15th-year head coach James L. Malone, the Indians compiled a record of 5–3–1, and were outscored by opponents 87 to 112.

Schedule

Date	Opponent	Site	Result	Source
September 16	Northwest Mississippi	Brown Field; Monroe, LA	W 12–6	
September 24	Eastern Oklahoma A&M	Brown Field; Monroe, LA	T 0–0	
October 2	at Kilgore	St. John Memorial Stadium; Kilgore, TX	L 0–27	
October 8	Copiah–Lincoln	Brown Field; Monroe, LA	L 2–14	
October 23	LSU 'B' team^{†}	Brown Field; Monroe, LA	W 19–13	
October 29	North Texas Aggies	Brown Field; Monroe, LA	W 14–0	
November 5	at McNeese	Lake Charles, LA	L 0–40	
November 11	Barksdale Field	Brown Field; Monroe, LA	W 27–6	
November 25	Livingston State	Brown Field; Monroe, LA	W 27–6	
^{†}Homecoming

== 1949 ==
1949 Northeast Center Indians football
- Conference: Independent
- Record: 2–5–1
- Head coach: James L. Malone (16th season)
- Home stadium: Brown Field

The 1949 Northeast Center Indians football team represented Northeast Junior College of Louisiana State University—now known as the University of Louisiana at Monroe—as an independent during the 1949 junior college football season. Led by 16th-year head coach James L. Malone, the Indians compiled a record of 2–5–1, and were outscored by opponents 113 to 143.

Schedule

Date	Opponent	Site	Result	Attendance	Source
September 23	Eastern Oklahoma A&M	Brown Field; Monroe, LA	W 19–7		
September 30	Kilgore	Brown Field; Monroe, LA	L 14–28		
October 15	Livingston State	Brown Field; Monroe, LA	L 6–7		
October 21	Panola	Brown Field; Monroe, LA	T 0–0		
October 28	LSU 'B' team	Brown Field; Monroe, LA	L 0–25		
November 4	McNeese^{†}	Brown Field; Monroe, LA	L 12–26		
November 12	at Little Rock	War Memorial Stadium; Little Rock, AR (Shrine Bowl)	L 13–50	6,000	
November 24	Northwest Mississippi	Brown Field; Monroe, LA	W 49–0		
^{†}Homecoming

== 1950 ==
1950 Northeast Louisiana State Indians football
- Conference: Big Six Junior College Conference
- Record: 4–5–1 (0–4–1 Big Six)
- Head coach: James L. Malone (17th season)
- Home stadium: Brown Field

1950 Big Six Junior College Conference football standings
	Conf.					Overall
Team	W		L		T	W		L		T
Tyler $	4	–	1	–	0	9	–	2	–	0
Kilgore	3	–	2	–	0	9	–	2	–	0
Paris	3	–	2	–	0	6	–	3	–	0
Cameron State	2	–	2	–	1	5	–	4	–	1
McNeese	2	–	3	–	0	5	–	5	–	0
Northeast Louisiana State	0	–	4	–	1	4	–	5	–	1
$ – Conference champion

The 1950 Northeast Louisiana State Indians football team represented Northeast Louisiana State College—now known as the University of Louisiana at Monroe—as a member of the Big Six Junior College Conference during the 1950 junior college football season. Led by 17th-year head coach James L. Malone, the Indians compiled an overall record record of 4–5–1 with a mark of 0–4–1 in conference play, placing last out of six teams in the Big Six Junior College Conference. The team outscored opponents 245 to 147.

Schedule

Date	Opponent	Site	Result	Attendance	Source
September 21	Poteau*	Brown Field; Monroe, LA	W 43–7		
September 28	at Kilgore	St. John Memorial Stadium; Kilgore, TX	L 0–27		
October 5	at Paris	Noyes Stadium; Paris, TX	L 13–30	2,000	
October 12	at McNeese	Lake Charles, LA	L 13–19		
October 19	at Panola*	Martin Field; Carthage, TX	L 0–20		
October 26	Tyler	Brown Field; Monroe, LA	L 6–34		
November 2	Southwest Mississippi*^{†}	Brown Field; Monroe, LA	W 51–0		
November 9	Little Rock*	Brown Field; Monroe, LA	W 42–15		
November 16	Cameron State	Brown Field; Monroe, LA	T 13–13		
November 28	Northwest Mississippi*	Brown Field; Monroe, LA	W 64–7		
*Non-conference game; ^{†}Homecoming
