= Big Six Junior College Conference =

Junior college athletic conference in Arkansas, Louisiana, Oklahoma, and Texas

The Big Six Junior College Conference was a junior college athletic conference with member schools located in Arkansas, Louisiana, Oklahoma, and Texas that operated from 1950 to 1954. The conference was formed in December 1949 with six initial members: Cameron State Agricultural College—now known as Cameron University, Kilgore College, McNeese Junior College—now known as McNeese State University, Northeast Junior College of Louisiana State University—now known as University of Louisiana at Monroe, Paris Junior College, and Tyler Junior College. J. R. McLemore, president of Paris Junior College, was the president of the conference. McNeese and Northeast Louisiana State left the conference in 1951 when the schools became four-year colleges. Little Rock Junior College—now known as University of Arkansas at Little Rock—joined the conference in 1952. Cameron and Little Rock both left the conference in 1953, leaving only the three Texas schools: Kilgore, Paris, and Tyler. The Big Six Junior College Conference dissolved in 1954. Kilgore and Tyler joined the newly-formed Longhorn Conference. Paris joined the Texas Junior College Conference (TJCC).

== Yearly football standings ==
1950 Big Six Junior College Conference football standings
	Conf.					Overall
Team	W		L		T	W		L		T
Tyler $	4	–	1	–	0	9	–	2	–	0
Kilgore	3	–	2	–	0	9	–	2	–	0
Paris	3	–	2	–	0	6	–	3	–	0
Cameron State	2	–	2	–	1	5	–	4	–	1
McNeese	2	–	3	–	0	5	–	5	–	0
Northeast Louisiana State	0	–	4	–	1	4	–	5	–	1
$ – Conference champion

1951 Big Six Junior College Conference football standings
	Conf.					Overall
Team	W		L		T	W		L		T
Tyler $	3	–	0	–	0	10	–	1	–	0
Kilgore	2	–	1	–	0	8	–	2	–	0
Cameron State	1	–	2	–	0	6	–	4	–	0
Paris	0	–	3	–	0	5	–	4	–	0
$ – Conference champion

1952 Big Six Junior College Conference football standings
	Conf.					Overall
Team	W		L		T	W		L		T
Tyler $	4	–	0	–	0	9	–	2	–	0
Cameron State	3	–	1	–	0	7	–	3	–	0
Paris	2	–	2	–	0	4	–	6	–	0
Little Rock	1	–	3	–	0	4	–	5	–	1
Kilgore	0	–	4	–	0	2	–	7	–	1
$ – Conference champion

1953 Big Six Junior College Conference football standings
	Conf.					Overall
Team	W		L		T	W		L		T
Tyler $	2	–	0	–	0	10	–	1	–	0
Paris	1	–	1	–	0	6	–	3	–	0
Kilgore	0	–	2	–	0	6	–	4	–	0
$ – Conference champion
