= Dave Roberts (American football) =

American football player and coach (born 1947)

Biographical details
- Born: February 28, 1947 (age 79); Wade Hampton, South Carolina, U.S.

Playing career
- 1966–1968: Western Carolina
- Position: Linebacker

Coaching career (HC unless noted)
- 1972: Eastern Kentucky (assistant)
- 1973–1978: Davidson (assistant)
- 1978–1983: Vanderbilt (assistant)
- 1984–1988: Western Kentucky
- 1989–1993: Northeast Louisiana
- 1994–1996: Notre Dame (OC/WR)
- 1997–1998: Baylor
- 1999–2004: South Carolina (assistant)

Head coaching record
- Overall: 67–68–3
- Tournaments: 2–5 (NCAA D-I-AA playoffs)

Accomplishments and honors

Championships
- 2 Southland (1990, 1992)

Dave Roberts (born February 28, 1947) is an American former college football player and coach. He served as the head football coach at Western Kentucky University (1984–1988), Northeast Louisiana University (1989–1993), and Baylor University (1997–1998), compiling a career head coaching record of 67–68–3.

== Coaching career ==
=== Northeast Louisiana ===
Roberts was the eighth head football coach at Northeast Louisiana University—known as the University of Louisiana at Monroe—located in Monroe, Louisiana and he held that position for five seasons, from 1989 until 1993. His coaching record at Northeast Louisiana was 38–19–2, including a forfeit by Louisiana Tech in 1989.

=== Baylor ===
Roberts was the head football coach at Baylor University from 1997 to 1998. He ignited controversy in 1997 when, after a loss to Texas Tech, he stated in a post-game press conference that he had told his players that "they were about as bad a football team as there is right now in America", drawing the ire of the Baylor faithful. Following the 1998 season, in which the Bears went 2–9 for a second consecutive season, he was fired by athletic director Tom Stanton. Roberts had previously served as the offensive coordinator under Lou Holtz at the University of Notre Dame. After being fired by Baylor he rejoined Holtz as an offensive assistant at the University of South Carolina.

After 1956 and until 2010, Roberts was the only Baylor head football coach other than Grant Teaff to beat the Texas Longhorns, doing so in 1997 (Grant Teaff coached Baylor for 21 years and had many victories over the Longhorns).

== Head coaching record ==
Year	Team	Overall	Conference	Standing	Bowl/playoffs
Western Kentucky (NCAA Division I-AA independent) (1984–1988)
1984	Western Kentucky	2–9			
1985	Western Kentucky	4–7			
1986	Western Kentucky	4–6–1			
1987	Western Kentucky	7–4			L NCAA Division I-AA First Round
1988	Western Kentucky	9–4			L NCAA Division I-AA Quarterfinal
Western Kentucky:		26–30–1			
Northeast Louisiana Indians (Southland Conference) (1989–1993)
1989	Northeast Louisiana	4–6–1	2–3–1	4th	
1990	Northeast Louisiana	7–5	5–1	1st	L NCAA Division I-AA First Round
1991	Northeast Louisiana	7–3–1	4–2	3rd	
1992	Northeast Louisiana	10–3	7–0	1st	L NCAA Division I-AA Quarterfinal
1993	Northeast Louisiana	9–3	6–1	2nd	L NCAA Division I-AA First Round
Northeast Louisiana:		37–20–2	24–7–1		
Baylor Bears (Big 12 Conference) (1997–1998)
1997	Baylor	2–9	1–7	6th (South)	
1998	Baylor	2–9	1–7	6th (South)	
Baylor:		4–18	2–14		
Total:		67–68–3			
