= Pat Collins (American football) =

American football coach (1941–2026)

Biographical details
- Born: August 20, 1941
- Died: February 12, 2026 (aged 84)

Playing career
- 1960–1962: Louisiana Tech

Coaching career (HC unless noted)
- 1963: Louisiana Tech (GA)
- 1964–1966: Airline HS (LA) (assistant)
- 1967–1980: Louisiana Tech (assistant)
- 1981–1988: Northeast Louisiana
- 1989: Arkansas State (volunteer)
- 1990–1991: Arkansas State (DC)

Head coaching record
- Overall: 57–35

Accomplishments and honors

Championships
- 1 NCAA Division I-AA (1987); 2 Southland (1983, 1987)

Pat Collins (August 20, 1941 – February 12, 2026) was an American football coach. He was the seventh head football coach for Northeast Louisiana University (now known as the University of Louisiana at Monroe) located in Monroe, Louisiana.

== Coaching career ==
After graduating from Louisiana Tech, he became a graduate assistant. He then did some high school coaching before becoming a full-time assistant coach at Tech. He was a part of the coaching staff (focusing on defense) that won three consecutive NCAA College Division / Division II Championships from 1971 to 1973. When head coach Maxie Lambright retired in 1978, Tech elected to hire Larry Beightol over anybody in Lambright's staff.

Thomas Eddleman, an assistant on John David Crow's staff at Northeast Louisiana (now known as Louisiana–Monroe), lobbied to get Collins hired at the program, which was accepted. When Crow resigned in 1981, Collins became head coach. In his tenure as a coach, his intensity attracted recruits such as quarterbacks Bubby Brister and Stan Humphries. The 1983 team won a share of the Southland Conference for their first conference championship in team history. compiling a record of 57–35. The 1986 team was picked to win the Southland but disappointed with just five wins even with a top ten defense. The 1987 team won the Division I-AA national championship with five straight playoff victories (three won by less than four points) and a dramatic comeback in the 1987 NCAA Division I-AA Football Championship Game where they rallied from being down 42-28 in the fourth quarter with two touchdown passes from Humphries for the first (and so far) only football championship for the program, which also is the only Division I-AA/FCS championship won in the state of Louisiana. In the days where Louisiana Tech and Northeast Louisiana played regularly, Collins won six of the eight matchups between his team against Tech.

He resigned in January 1989 following a domestic dispute. He became a coach and administrator at West Ouachita, Ouachita and Longview before retiring in 2011. He was inducted into the Louisiana Sports Hall of Fame in 2015.

== Death ==
Collins died on February 12, 2026, at the age of 84.

== Head coaching record ==
Year	Team	Overall	Conference	Standing	Bowl/playoffs
Northeast Louisiana Indians (NCAA Division I-A independent) (1981)
1981	Northeast Louisiana	5–6			
Northeast Louisiana Indians (Southland Conference) (1982–1988)
1982	Northeast Louisiana	8–3	4–1	2nd	
1983	Northeast Louisiana	8–3	5–1	T–1st	
1984	Northeast Louisiana	7–4	3–3	4th	
1985	Northeast Louisiana	6–5	3–3	4th	
1986	Northeast Louisiana	5–6	3–2	T–2nd	
1987	Northeast Louisiana	13–2	6–0	1st	W NCAA Division I-AA Championship
1988	Northeast Louisiana	5–6	2–4	5th	
Northeast Louisiana:		57–35			
Total:		57–35			
National championship Conference title Conference division title or championship game berth
