= Charlie Weatherbie =

American football player and coach (born 1955)

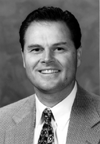

Biographical details
- Born: January 17, 1955 (age 71); Sedan, Kansas, U.S.

Playing career
- 1973–1976: Oklahoma State
- 1979: Ottawa Rough Riders
- 1979–1980: Hamilton Tiger-Cats
- 1980: Ottawa Rough Riders
- Position: Quarterback

Coaching career (HC unless noted)
- 1977: Oklahoma State (GA)
- 1978: Enid HS (OK) (assistant)
- 1981–1983: Wyoming (QB)
- 1984–1989: Air Force (assistant)
- 1990–1991: Arkansas (QB/OC)
- 1992–1994: Utah State
- 1995–2001: Navy
- 2003–2009: Louisiana–Monroe

Head coaching record
- Overall: 76–115
- Bowls: 2–0

Accomplishments and honors

Championships
- 1 Big West (1993); 1 Sun Belt (2005)

Charles Alvin Weatherbie (born January 17, 1955) is an American former college football coach and player. He served as the head football coach at Utah State University (1992–1994), the United States Naval Academy (1995–2001), and Louisiana Monroe (2003–2009).

In 17 seasons as a college football head coach, he compiled a 76–115 record, including victories in the 1993 Las Vegas Bowl, the 1996 Aloha Bowl, and a 2007 victory over Nick Saban's Alabama Crimson Tide in Tuscaloosa at Bryant–Denny Stadium.

== Coaching career ==
Following the 1980 CFL season, Weatherbie decided to halt his playing career for the sake of his family and enter the realm of coaching, finding a job as the quarterback coach for Wyoming from 1981–83. He would subsequently move onto Air Force for six years, coaching quarterbacks and fullbacks under Fisher DeBerry.

In 1989, when Elliot Uzelac was fired by Navy Midshipmen, Weatherbie, who had been a part of six consecutive Air Force victories over Navy, called athletic director Jack Lengyel, who informed him he was looking for someone with head coaching experience. This was a driving factor in Weatherbie's move to Arkansas under Jack Crowe where he spent 1990 as the quarterback coach, and 1991 as an offensive coordinator, for the first time in his career serving in a coordinator position.

Weatherbie's move paid off when he was hired in 1992 to serve as head coach for the Utah State Aggies. In 1993, Weatherbie helmed the Aggies to their first bowl appearance in 32 years, defeating Ball State, 42–33. Following a 3–8 season in 1994, Weatherbie's head was turned by the now-vacant head coaching position at his alma mater, Oklahoma State. (The idea of a return existed strongly enough in Weatherbie's mind to include a no-buyout exit clause to allow him to join Oklahoma State when he signed his initial contract at Utah State.) "It was a dream," Weatherbie would state. Oklahoma State's position was filled on December 16, 1994, with Bob Simmons, which left Weatherbie unencumbered to pursue the once-again vacant Naval Academy head coaching role. Weatherbie would be announced on December 30, 1994, as the 34th coach in Navy's footballing history.

Weatherbie's first season in charge was extensively chronicled in John Feinstein's book 'A Civil War' about the Army–Navy rivalry following both teams during the 1995 season. Weatherbie went 5–6 in his first season, including a difficult loss to Army in which the Midshipmen opted to go for it on fourth and goal from their half-yard line, up six, instead of kicking a field goal. The Midshipmen were stopped, and Army would go the entire length of the field to score a touchdown, win the game 14–13, and doom Navy to a losing season and a fourth consecutive loss in the Army/Navy Game.

Weatherbie led Navy, in 1996 and 1997, to their first consecutive winning seasons in 15 years. 1996 saw the Midshipmen's first bowl victory since 1978, a victory in the 1996 Aloha Bowl against the California Golden Bears. The successes of 1996 saw Weatherbie sign a ten-year contract with the Academy. 1997 saw Navy snap a five-game losing streak to Army in 1997 with a 39–7 thumping.

Weatherbie's '97 Midshipmen were also involved in a highly-memorable game against Notre Dame. The Midshipmen lost 21–17, hindered immensely by an erroneous spot that allowed the Irish's game-winning drive to continue en route to a touchdown. Following the game, a somewhat bizarre scene occurred. In 1995, the playing of Navy's alma mater was disrupted by the Band of the Fighting Irish, and the athletic directors of the two schools agreed that the band would only take the field following the playing of 'Blue and Gold'. By this point in time, the deeply Christian Weatherbie had implemented a midfield prayer as part of his team's post-game actions. Following the playing of 'Blue and Gold', as expected, the Irish band took the field, but Weatherbie directed his team to midfield, pointing and saying, "Prayer." Feinstein, in 'A Civil War', described the scene: "An [sic] so they began charging through the band to midfield. It was not a pretty scene. ... A couple of band members were knocked down, instruments sent flying. Profanities were exchanged." Feinstein wrote media members on-field reported quotes the next day to the effect of, "Get out of our way, goddamn it, we've got to f––– pray." Fighting Irish fans booed the scene, and Weatherbie responded in the press stating, "We sing the ‘Navy Blue and Gold’ and say a prayer at midfield after every game. This is the first time we’ve been booed for praying." Jack Lengyel and Weatherbie agreed to a shift for the post-game prayer to occur the end zone, particularly in the event of a band performance.

Weatherbie continued at Navy into the 2001 season, however his back-to-back winning seasons, and Aloha Bowl victory, were the high water marks. Despite wins over Army in 1999 and 2000, after a 1–10 season in 2000, the Midshipmen started the 2001 season 0–7 and Weatherbie was relieved of his duties.

After a year away from coaching, Weatherbie accepted the head job at Louisiana–Monroe in 2003. At his time of joining, the (then) Indians, in nine years of Division I-A football, had never won more than three games against I-A opposition. After a 1–11 first season, Weatherbie accomplished a 5–6 season, with all five wins against I-A opposition, in 2004, and a Sun Belt Conference Co-Championship and 5–2 conference record in 2005.

Weatherbie was head coach of UL–Monroe in 2007 when the team defeated Alabama 21–14 during Nick Saban's first season as the Crimson Tide's head coach. The loss has been cited by Saban as one of his most humiliating. The now-Warhawks had accomplished a 6–6 (.500) season for the first time in their I-A history, and would follow that up again in 2009. This, ultimately, would be Weatherbie's final season as a collegiate coach; Louisiana-Monroe would not extend his contract.

== Personal life and religiosity ==
Weatherbie's post-coaching career revolves around missionary work towards athletes.

Discussing Weatherbie's evangelical faith in a service academy setting, in 'A Civil War' (in an updated 2000 afterword for the paperback release of the book), John Feinstein would state, "Weatherbie's evangelical Christianity had been accepted at the academy in part because it was clearly genuine, in part because the team had been winning games. But there was some discomfort within the team and the athletic department with this added public display."

Feinstein cited the opening line of Weatherbie's first meeting with the 1995 team to be, "Men, let's all grab a hand and start with a prayer" [p. 26] and would provide further examples as to the extent in which prayer was involved in a Weatherbie-run football program, including praying for very specific requests ("Lord, give us the ability to focus until the clock hits zero, zero, zero" [p. 127] ahead of his first game at Navy in 1995, "Lord, allow us to do a good job analyzing this video we're going to watch" [p. 217] ahead of a film session, for two).

== Head coaching record ==
Year	Team	Overall	Conference	Standing	Bowl/playoffs
Utah State Aggies (Big West Conference) (1992–1994)
1992	Utah State	5–6	4–2	T–2nd	
1993	Utah State	7–5	5–1	T–1st	W Las Vegas
1994	Utah State	3–8	2–4	7th	
Utah State:		15–19	11–7		
Navy Midshipmen (NCAA Division I-A independent) (1995–2001)
1995	Navy	5–6			
1996	Navy	9–3			W Aloha
1997	Navy	7–4			
1998	Navy	3–8			
1999	Navy	5–7			
2000	Navy	1–10			
2001	Navy	0–7			
Navy:		30–45			
Louisiana–Monroe Indians/Warhawks (Sun Belt Conference) (2003–2009)
2003	Louisiana–Monroe	1–11	1–5	8th	
2004	Louisiana–Monroe	5–6	3–3	T–5th	
2005	Louisiana–Monroe	5–6	5–2	T–1st	
2006	Louisiana–Monroe	4–8	3–4	T–5th	
2007	Louisiana–Monroe	6–6	4–3	T–3rd	
2008	Louisiana–Monroe	4–8	3–4	T–5th	
2009	Louisiana–Monroe	6–6	5–3	3rd	
Louisiana–Monroe:		31–51	24–24		
Total:		76–115			
National championship Conference title Conference division title or championship game berth
