= Devone Payne =

American football coach and administrator (1913–1958)

Biographical details
- Born: November 14, 1913; Philadelphia, Mississippi, U.S.
- Died: March 20, 1958 (aged 44); Monroe, Louisiana, U.S.

Playing career

Football
- c. 1935: Louisiana College

Basketball
- c. 1935: Louisiana College

Track
- c. 1935: Louisiana College

Coaching career (HC unless noted)

Football
- 1939: Gilbert HS (LA)
- 1940–1941: Winnsboro HS (LA)
- 1942–1943: Ouachita Parish HS (LA) (assistant)
- 1944: Neville HS (LA)
- 1945–1952: Tallulah HS (LA)
- 1953: Louisiana College
- 1954–1957: Northeast Louisiana State

Administrative career (AD unless noted)
- 1954–1958: Northeast Louisiana State

Head coaching record
- Overall: 18–29–1 (college football)

Howard Devone Payne (November 14, 1913 – March 20, 1958) was an American football coach and college athletics administrator. He served as head football coach at Louisiana College in 1953 and Northeast Louisiana State College—now known as the University of Louisiana at Monroe—serving four seasons, from 1954 to 1957, and compiling a career college football coaching record of 18–29–1. Payne lettered in football, basketball, and track at Louisiana College, serving as team captain in football in 1937.

Payne died on March 20, 1958, at a hospital in Monroe, Louisiana, where he had been undergoing surgery for ulcers. In 2007 Payne was inducted into the ULM Sports Hall of Fame. He is also a member of the Louisiana High School Athletic Association, having been inducted in 1992 posthumously.

== Head coaching record ==
=== College football ===
| Year | Team | Overall | Conference | Standing | Bowl/playoffs |
|---|---|---|---|---|---|
Louisiana College Wildcats (Gulf States Conference) (1953)
| 1953 | Louisiana College | 4–6 | 1–5 | T–6th | |
| Louisiana College: | | 4–6 | 1–5 | | |
Northeast Louisiana State Indians (Gulf States Conference) (1954–1957)
| 1954 | Northeast Louisiana State | 1–8–1 | 0–5–1 | 7th | |
| 1955 | Northeast Louisiana State | 4–6 | 1–5 | 6th | |
| 1956 | Northeast Louisiana State | 7–3 | 2–3 | T–4th | |
| 1957 | Northeast Louisiana State | 2–6 | 0–5 | 6th | |
| Northeast Louisiana State: | | 14–23–1 | 3–18–1 | | |
| Total: | | 18–29–1 | | | |
