= Ed Zaunbrecher =

American football player and coach (born 1950)

Biographical details
- Born: March 1, 1950 (age 76); Rayne, Louisiana, U.S.

Playing career
- 1969–1972: Middle Tennessee

Coaching career (HC unless noted)
- 1975–1976: Arizona (OL)
- 1977–1979: Purdue (OB/WR)
- 1980–1983: Wake Forest (OC/QB/WR)
- 1984–1990: LSU (OC/QB)
- 1991: Michigan State (QB)
- 1992–1993: Michigan State (LB)
- 1994–1998: Northeast Louisiana
- 1999: Marshall (QB)
- 2000–2001: Marshall (OC/QB)
- 2002–2003: Florida (OC/QB)
- 2004: Florida (QB)
- 2005: Illinois (PCG/QB)
- 2006–2008: Purdue (co-OC/QB)
- 2009: Rice (OC/QB)

Head coaching record
- Overall: 20–36

Ed Zaunbrecher (born March 1, 1950) is an American football college football coach. He served as the head football coach at Northeast Louisiana University—now known as the University of Louisiana at Monroe,—from 1994 to 1998, compiling a record of 20–36. He is currently the head instructor for the Ed Zaunbrecher Coaching School.

== Coaching career ==
During his tenure as head coach at the Northeast Louisiana, Zaunbrecher transitioned the football program from NCAA Division I-AA to NCAA Division I-A. He held that position for five seasons, from 1994 until 1998. His coaching record at the Northeast Louisiana was 20–36. The highlights of his stint at Northeast Louisiana included victories over Southeastern Conference teams Mississippi State and Kentucky, and giving numerous other teams scares including a 1996 near victory over a ranked Auburn team.

== Head coaching record ==
Year	Team	Overall	Conference	Standing	Bowl/playoffs
Northeast Louisiana Indians (NCAA Division I-A independent) (1994–1998)
1994	Northeast Louisiana	3–8			
1995	Northeast Louisiana	2–9			
1996	Northeast Louisiana	5–6			
1997	Northeast Louisiana	5–7			
1998	Northeast Louisiana	5–6			
Northeast Louisiana:		20–36			
Total:		20–36			
