= James L. Malone (American football) =

American football coach (1908–1979)

Biographical details
- Born: March 14, 1908; Reform, Alabama, U.S.
- Died: April 10, 1979 (aged 71); Monroe, Louisiana, U.S.

Playing career

Football
- 1930–1932: LSU
- Positions: Guard, tackle

Coaching career (HC unless noted)

Football
- 1933: LSU (freshmen)
- 1934–1953: Northeast Center / Northeast Louisiana State

Basketball
- 1934–?: Northeast Center

Head coaching record
- Overall: 12–15 (college football); 82–49–12 (junior college football)
- Bowls: 2–1 (junior college)

James Lee Malone (March 14, 1908 – April 10, 1979) was an American college football and college basketball coach. He was the first head football coach at Northeast Louisiana State College—now known as the University of Louisiana at Monroe—serving for 18 seasons, from 1934 to 1953. He later worked for a life insurance company at Baton Rouge upon resigning from his post at Northeast Louisiana. Malone Stadium at Monroe was named after him.

Malone was an alumnus of Louisiana State University (LSU), where he had played football and also coached the freshman football team in 1933. He was married to Marjorie Foster Malone. He died in 1979. Marjorie died in 2010.

== Head coaching record ==
=== College football ===
Year	Team	Overall	Conference	Standing	Bowl/playoffs
Northeast Louisiana State Indians (Independent) (1951–1952)
1951	Northeast Louisiana State	6–2			
1952	Northeast Louisiana State	5–4			
Northeast Louisiana State Indians (Gulf States Conference) (1953)
1953	Northeast Louisiana State	1–9	1–5	T–6th	
Northeast Louisiana State:		12–15	1–5		
Total:		12–15			

=== Junior college football ===
Year	Team	Overall	Conference	Standing	Bowl/playoffs
Northeast Center Indians (Independent) (1934–1949)
1934	Northeast Center	5–3–1			
1935	Northeast Center	8–0			
1936	Northeast Center	4–4–1			W Tuberculosis benefit game
1937	Northeast Center	7–0–1			
1938	Northeast Center	7–3–1			
1939	Northeast Center	6–4–1			
1940	Northeast Center	6–2–1			
1941	Northeast Center	4–3–1			
1942	Northeast Center	5–3			
1943	Northeast Center	2–2			
1944	Northeast Center	2–1–2			
1945	Northeast Center	6–2			
1946	Northeast Center	2–7			
1947	Northeast Center	7–2			W Junior Sugar Bowl
1948	Northeast Center	5–3–1			
1949	Northeast Center	2–5–1			L Shrine Bowl
Northeast Louisiana State Indians (Big Six Junior College Conference) (1950)
1950	Northeast Louisiana State	4–5–1	0–4–1	6th	
Northeast Center / Northeast Louisiana State:		82–49–12	0–4–1		
Total:		83–47–13			
