= Jack C. Rowan =

American football coach and college athletics administrator

Biographical details
- Born: March 22, 1911
- Died: August 31, 1990 (aged 79); Monroe, Louisiana, U.S.

Coaching career (HC unless noted)
- c. 1941: Mullens Byrd HS (WV)
- 1946–1956: C. E. Byrd HS (LA)
- 1957: Northwestern State (assistant)
- 1958–1963: Northeast Louisiana State

Administrative career (AD unless noted)
- 1958–1964: Northeast Louisiana State

Head coaching record
- Overall: 20–37 (college)

Jack C. Rowan (March 22, 1911 – August 31, 1990) was an American football coach and college athletics administrator. He was the third head football coach at Northeast Louisiana State College—now known as University of Louisiana at Monroe, serving for six seasons, from 1958 to 1963, and compiling a record of 20–37.

== Head coaching record ==
=== College ===
| Year | Team | Overall | Conference | Standing | Bowl/playoffs |
|---|---|---|---|---|---|
Northeast Louisiana State Indians (Gulf States Conference) (1958–1963)
| 1958 | Northeast Louisiana State | 6–3 | 3–2 | 3rd | |
| 1959 | Northeast Louisiana State | 2–8 | 1–4 | 6th | |
| 1960 | Northeast Louisiana State | 3–7 | 1–4 | 5th | |
| 1961 | Northeast Louisiana State | 3–7 | 1–4 | 5th | |
| 1962 | Northeast Louisiana State | 2–6 | 1–4 | 6th | |
| 1963 | Northeast Louisiana State | 4–6 | 1–4 | T–5th | |
| Northeast Louisiana State: | | 20–37 | 8–22 | | |
| Total: | | 20–37 | | | |
