= Dixie B. White =

American football player and coach (1917–1990)

Biographical details
- Born: February 7, 1917; Lubbock, Texas, U.S.
- Died: October 24, 1990 (aged 73); Monroe, Louisiana, U.S.

Playing career
- 1937–1939: Texas Tech
- Position: Guard

Coaching career (HC unless noted)
- 1941–1946: Lubbock HS (TX) (line)
- 1947–1948: Denison HS (TX) (line)
- 1949–1950: Hardin / Midwestern (TX) (line)
- 1951–1952: Midwestern (TX)
- 1953: Idaho (assistant)
- 1955–1961: Arkansas (OL)
- 1962–1963: LSU (OL)
- 1964–1971: Northeast Louisiana
- 1972–1976: New Orleans Saints (OL/scout)

Administrative career (AD unless noted)
- 1964–1971: Northeast Louisiana

Head coaching record
- Overall: 42–54–2 (college)

Dixie B. White (February 7, 1917 – October 24, 1990) was an American football coach. He was the fourth head football coach at Northeast Louisiana University in Monroe, Louisiana and he held that position for eight seasons, from 1964 until 1971. His coaching record at Northeast Louisiana was 31–45–1.

In 1984, White was inducted into the Northeast Louisiana University Hall of Fame.

== Playing career ==
White played college football as a guard at Texas Tech University from 1937 to 1939, including teams that advanced to the 1938 Sun Bowl and 1939 Cotton Bowl. He was captain of the team as a senior in 1939 and helped coach freshmen in 1940.

In 1983, White was inducted into the Texas Tech Hall of Honor.

== Head coaching record ==
Year	Team	Overall	Conference	Standing	Bowl/playoffs
Midwestern Indians (Gulf Coast Conference) (1951–1952)
1951	Midwestern	5–4–1	0–1–1	T–2nd	
1952	Midwestern	6–5	1–1	2nd	
Midwestern:		11–9–1	1–2–1		
Northeast Louisiana State Indians / Northeast Louisiana Indians (Gulf States Conference) (1964–1970)
1964	Northeast Louisiana State	0–8	0–5	6th	
1965	Northeast Louisiana State	1–8	0–5	6th	
1966	Northeast Louisiana State	7–3	2–3	4th	
1967	Northeast Louisiana State	7–3	3–2	T–2nd	
1968	Northeast Louisiana State	6–4	3–2	T–2nd	
1969	Northeast Louisiana	1–9	0–5	6th	
1970	Northeast Louisiana	5–4	3–2	T–2nd	
Northeast Louisiana Indians (NCAA College Division independent) (1971)
1971	Northeast Louisiana	4–6–1			
Northeast Louisiana:		31–45–1	11–24		
Total:		42–54–2			
