= 2012 Sun Belt Conference football season =

- League: NCAA Division I FBS (Football Bowl Subdivision)
- Sport: football
- Duration: August 30, 2012 - January 6, 2013
- Teams: 10
- TV partner(s): ESPN, CSS/CST

2013 NFL Draft
- Top draft pick: S Johnathan Cyprien, FIU
- Picked by: Jacksonville Jaguars, 33rd overall

Regular season
- Season champions: Arkansas State
- Runners-up: Louisiana-Lafayette, Louisiana-Monroe, Middle Tennessee State

Football seasons
- 2011 2013

2012 Sun Belt Conference football standings
	Conf.			Overall
Team	W		L	W		L
Arkansas State $	7	–	1	10	–	3
Louisiana–Monroe	6	–	2	8	–	5
Middle Tennessee	6	–	2	8	–	4
Louisiana–Lafayette *	4	–	2	5	–	4
Western Kentucky	4	–	4	7	–	6
Troy	3	–	5	5	–	7
North Texas	3	–	5	4	–	8
Florida Atlantic	2	–	6	3	–	9
FIU	2	–	6	3	–	9
South Alabama **	1	–	7	2	–	11
$ – Conference champion; * – Louisiana–Lafayette vacated 4 wins due to NCAA violations. ** – South Alabama was ineligible for the conference title or a bowl game as part of their transition to the FBS.

The 2012 Sun Belt Conference football season was the 12th season of college football play for the Sun Belt Conference. The season began August 30, 2012 and concluded January 6, 2013 as part of the 2012-13 NCAA Division I FBS football season. Ten teams participated in the competition: Arkansas State, Florida Atlantic, Florida International, Louisiana–Lafayette, Louisiana–Monroe, Middle Tennessee State, North Texas, South Alabama, Troy and Western Kentucky.

As part of the 2010-13 NCAA conference realignment, this was Florida Atlantic's and Florida International's final season in the conference before moving to Conference USA in 2013.

South Alabama competed in the Sun Belt for the first time and became the conference's tenth team. Due to NCAA transitional rules, South Alabama was not eligible for a conference championship or postseason play.

== Preseason ==
=== Award watch lists ===
The following Sun Belt players were named to preseason award watch lists:

Walter Camp Award
Player	Team
Ryan Aplin	Arkansas State

Doak Walker Award
Player	Team
Kedrick Rhodes	Florida International
Benny Cunningham	Middle Tennessee
Shawn Southward	Troy

John Mackey Award
Player	Team
Jack Doyle	Western Kentucky

Manning Award
Player	Team
Ryan Aplin	Arkansas State
Blaine Gautier	Louisiana–Lafayette

Bronko Nagurski Trophy
Player	Team
Andrew Jackson	Western Kentucky

Outland Trophy
Player	Team
Caylin Hauptmann	Florida International

Lombardi Award
Player	Team
Adam Smith	Western Kentucky
Andrew Jackson	Western Kentucky
Winston Fraser	Florida International

Rimington Trophy
Player	Team
Andre Huval	Louisiana–Lafayette

Davey O'Brien Award
Player	Team
Ryan Aplin	Arkansas State

Jim Thorpe Award
Player	Team
Brynden Trawick	Troy
Jonathan Cyprien	Florida International

Ray Guy Award
Player	Team
Will Atterberry	North Texas

Lou Groza Award
Player	Team
Brett Baer	Louisiana–Lafayette
Jake Griffin	Florida International

=== Sun Belt Media Day ===
The Sun Belt media day was held on 16 July, in New Orleans, Louisiana. Florida International received five first place votes and were selected by the coaches as the favorites to win the conference. Arkansas State and Louisiana-Lafayette each received two first place votes, while Western Kentucky received one.

==== Coaches Poll ====
Position	Team	Votes	First-place votes
1	Florida International	92	5
2	Arkansas State	85	2
3	Louisiana–Lafayette	81	2
4	Western Kentucky	70	1
5	Troy	60	
6	Louisiana–Monroe	47	
7	Middle Tennessee	42	
8	North Texas	36	
9	Florida Atlantic	23	
10	South Alabama	14	

==== Preseason All–Conference Team ====
The head coaches of the competing teams selected their All–Conference Team. The coaches also selected Ryan Aplin of Arkansas State as the preseason offensive player of the year, and Tourek Williams of Florida International as the preseason defensive player of the year.

Offense

Position	Name	Team
QB	Ryan Aplin	Arkansas State
RB	Kedrick Rhodes	Florida International
RB	Alonzo Harris	Louisiana–Lafayette
WR	Josh Jarboe	Arkansas State
WR	Javone Lawson	Louisiana–Lafayette
WR	Eric Thomas	Troy
TE	Jack Doyle	Western Kentucky
OL	Zack McKnight	Arkansas State
OL	Rupert Bryan	Florida International
OL	Caylin Hauptmann	Florida International
OL	Leonardo Bates	Louisiana–Lafayette
OL	Cyril Lemon	North Texas

Defense

Position	Name	Team
DL	Isame Faciane	Florida International
DL	Tourek Williams	Florida International
DL	Tony Davis	Troy
DL	Quanterus Smith	Western Kentucky
LB	Andrew Jackson	Western Kentucky
LB	Winston Fraser	Florida International
LB	Kanorris Davis	Troy
DB	Brynden Trawick	Troy
DB	Jonathan Cyprien	Florida International
DB	Don Jones	Arkansas State
DB	Melvin White	Louisiana–Lafayette

Specialists

Position	Name	Team
PK	Brett Baer	Louisiana–Lafayette
P	Will Atterberry	North Texas
RS	John Evans	Western Kentucky

== Coaches ==
NOTE: Stats shown are before the beginning of the season

Team	Head coach	Years at school	Overall record	Record at school	Sun Belt record
Arkansas State	Gus Malzahn	1	0–0	0–0	0–0
Florida Atlantic	Carl Pelini	1	0–0	0–0	0–0
Florida International	Mario Cristobal	6	24–38	24–38	18–20
Louisiana–Lafayette	Mark Hudspeth	2	75–25	9–4	6–2
Louisiana–Monroe	Todd Berry	3	38–74	9–15	7–9
Middle Tennessee	Rick Stockstill	7	35–40	35–40	26–19
North Texas	Dan McCarney	2	61–92	5–7	4–4
South Alabama	Joey Jones	4	26–11	23–4	0–0
Troy	Larry Blakeney	24	163–92–1	163–92–1	42–17
Western Kentucky	Willie Taggart	3	9–15	9–15	9–7

== Sun Belt vs. BCS AQ Conference matchups ==
Date	Visitor	Home	Notes
September 1	Arkansas State 34	#5 Oregon 57	
September 1	North Texas 14	#3 LSU 41	
September 1	Florida International 26	Duke 46	
September 8^	#8 Arkansas 31	Louisiana–Monroe 34	Played in Little Rock, AR. First SBC win over Top 10 team in history
September 8	Western Kentucky 0	#1 Alabama 35	
September 15	Arkansas State 13	Nebraska 42	
September 15	Louisiana–Lafayette 24	Oklahoma State 65	
September 15	Louisiana–Monroe 28	Auburn 31	
September 15	South Alabama 7	NC State 31	
September 15	Mississippi State 30	Troy 24	
September 15	North Texas 21	Kansas State 35	
September 15	Western Kentucky 32	Kentucky 31	WKU's first win over SEC competition
September 15	Florida Atlantic 20	Georgia 56	
September 21	Baylor 47	Louisiana–Monroe 42	
September 22	Florida Atlantic 7	Alabama 40	
September 22	Louisville 28	Florida International 21	
September 22	South Alabama 10	Mississippi State 30	
September 29	Middle Tennessee 49	Georgia Tech 28	
October 20	Middle Tennessee 3	#15 Mississippi State 45	
November 3	Troy 48	Tennessee 55	
November 10	Louisiana-Lafayette 20	#7 Florida 27	
^Denotes neutral site game

== Regular season ==
Index to colors and formatting
Sun Belt member won
Sun Belt member lost
Sun Belt teams in **bold**

The Sun Belt has teams in two different time zones. Times reflect start time in respective time zone of each team (all teams central time except for Florida Atlantic and Florida International which are in eastern time). Conference games start times are that of the home team.

Rankings reflect that of the USA Today Coaches poll for that week, until week eight when the BCS poll was used.

=== Week 1 ===
Date	Time	Visiting team	Home team	Site	TV	Result	Attendance
August 30	6:30 p.m.	McNeese St	**Middle Tennessee**	Johnny "Red" Floyd Stadium • Murfreesboro, TN	ESPN3	**L** 21-27	18,690
August 31	8:00 p.m.	Wagner	**Florida Atlantic**	FAU Stadium • Boca Raton, FL	ESPN3	**W** 7-3	14,510
September 1	11:00 a.m.	**Troy**	UAB	Legion Field • Birmingham, AL	Fox College Sports	**W** 39-29	28,612
September 1	1:00 p.m.	UTSA	**South Alabama**	Ladd-Peebles Stadium • Mobile, AL	ESPN3	**L** 31-33	17,144
September 1	6:00 p.m.	**North Texas**	#3 LSU	Tiger Stadium • Baton Rouge, LA	ESPNU	**L** 14-41	92,059
September 1	6:00 p.m.	Austin Peay	**Western Kentucky**	Houchens Industries–L. T. Smith Stadium • Bowling Green, KY	ESPN3	**W** 49-10	16,327
September 1	6:00 p.m.	Lamar	**Louisiana-Lafayette**	Cajun Field • Lafayette, LA	ESPN3/Ragin Cajuns Network	**W** 40-0	25,803
September 1	7:00 p.m.	**Florida International**	Duke	Wallace Wade Stadium • Durham, NC	ESPN3	**L** 26-46	31,117
September 1	9:30 p.m.	**Arkansas State**	#5 Oregon	Autzen Stadium • Eugene, OR	ESPN	**L** 34-57	56,144

Players of the week:

Offensive		Defensive		Special teams	
Player	Team	Player	Team	Player	Team
Shawn Southward	Troy	De'Von Terry	Troy	Brett Baer	Louisiana–Lafayette

=== Week 2 ===
Date	Time	Visiting team	Home team	Site	TV	Result	Attendance
September 8	2:30 p.m.	**Western Kentucky**	#1 Alabama	Bryant–Denny Stadium • Tuscaloosa, AL	SEC Network	**L** 0-35	101,821
September 8	4:00 p.m.	Nicholls State	**South Alabama**	Ladd-Peebles Stadium • Mobile, AL	ESPN3	**W** 9–3	15,237
September 8	6:00 p.m.	Memphis	**Arkansas State**	ASU Stadium • Jonesboro, AR	ESPN3	**W** 33-28	28,041
September 8^	6:00 p.m.	#8 Arkansas	**Louisiana-Monroe**	War Memorial Stadium • Little Rock, AR	ESPNU	**W** 34-31 OT	53,089
September 8	6:00 p.m.	Texas Southern	**North Texas**	Apogee Stadium • Denton, TX	TXA21	**W** 34-7	22,259
September 8	6:00 p.m.	Akron	**Florida International**	FIU Stadium • Miami, FL	ESPN3	**W** 41-38	15,685
September 8	6:00 p.m.	Florida Atlantic	Middle Tennessee	Johnny "Red" Floyd Stadium • Murfreesboro, TN	ESPN3	**MT** 31-17	16,227
September 8	6:00 p.m.	Louisiana-Lafayette	Troy	Veterans Memorial Stadium • Troy, AL	ESPN3	**ULL** 37-24	17,981

^ Neutral site

Players of the week:

Offensive		Defensive		Special teams	
Player	Team	Player	Team	Player	Team
Kolton Browning	Louisiana-Monroe	Jemarlous Moten	Louisiana-Lafayette	Brett Baer (2)	Louisiana-Lafayette

=== Week 3 ===
Date	Time	Visiting team	Home team	Site	TV	Result	Attendance
September 15	11:00 a.m.	**Louisiana-Monroe**	Auburn	Jordan–Hare Stadium • Auburn, AL	SEC Network	**L** 28-31 OT	85,214
September 15	11:00 a.m.	**Arkansas State**	Nebraska	Memorial Stadium • Lincoln, NE	ESPN2	**L** 13-42	85,290
September 15	11:00 a.m.	**Louisiana-Lafayette**	Oklahoma State	Boone Pickens Stadium • Stillwater, OK	FSN	**L** 24-65	56,062
September 15	4:00 p.m.	**Florida International**	UCF	Bright House Networks Stadium • Orlando, FL	CSS	**L** 20-33	40,478
September 15	5:00 p.m.	**South Alabama**	NC State	Carter–Finley Stadium • Raleigh, NC	ESPN3	**L** 7-31	54,132
September 15	6:00 p.m.	Mississippi State	**Troy**	Veterans Memorial Stadium • Troy, AL	ESPN3	**L** 24-30	29,013
September 15	6:00 p.m.	**Western Kentucky**	Kentucky	Commonwealth Stadium • Lexington, KY	ESPNU	**W** 32-31 OT	53,980
September 15	6:00 p.m.	**Middle Tennessee**	Memphis	Liberty Bowl Memorial Stadium • Memphis, TN		**W** 48-30	27,113
September 15	6:00 p.m.	**North Texas**	#15 Kansas State	Bill Snyder Family Football Stadium • Manhattan, KS	FSN	**L** 21-35	50,290
September 15	6:30 p.m.	**Florida Atlantic**	#7 Georgia	Sanford Stadium • Athens, GA	CSS	**L** 20-56	92,746

Players of the week:

Offensive		Defensive		Special teams	
Player	Team	Player	Team	Player	Team
Antonio Andrews	Western Kentucky	Jonathan Dowling	Western Kentucky	Hendrix Brakefield	Western Kentucky

=== Week 4 ===
Date	Time	Visiting team	Home team	Site	TV	Result	Attendance
September 21	7:00 p.m.	Baylor	**Louisiana-Monroe**	Malone Stadium • Monroe, LA	ESPN^	**L** 42-47	31,175
September 22	4:00 p.m.	**Florida Atlantic**	#1 Alabama	Bryant–Denny Stadium • Tuscaloosa, AL	PPV	**L** 7-40	101,821
September 22	6:00 p.m.	#18 Louisville	**Florida International**	FIU Stadium • Miami, FL	ESPN3	**L** 21-28	12,318
September 22	6:00 p.m.	Southern Miss	**Western Kentucky**	Houchens Industries–L. T. Smith Stadium • Bowling Green, KY	ESPN3	**W** 42-17	23,252
September 22	6:00 p.m.	Alcorn St.	**Arkansas State**	ASU Stadium • Jonesboro, AR	ESPN3	**W** 56-0	21,559
September 22	6:00 p.m.	**South Alabama**	#23 Mississippi State	Davis Wade Stadium • Starkville, MS	Bulldog Sports	**L** 10-30	55,186
September 22	6:00 p.m.	Troy	North Texas	Apogee Stadium • Denton, TX	ESPN3	**Troy** 14-7	21,823

^ULM-Baylor game was most watched Sun Belt game on ESPN in history.

Players of the week:

Offensive		Defensive		Special teams	
Player	Team	Player	Team	Player	Team
Antonio Andrews (2)	Western Kentucky	Brynden Trawick	Troy	Will Scott	Troy

=== Week 5 ===
Date	Time	Visiting team	Home team	Site	TV	Result	Attendance
September 29	11:30 a.m.	**Middle Tennessee**	Georgia Tech	Bobby Dodd Stadium • Atlanta, GA	ACC RSN	**W** 49-28	39,270
September 29	2:30 p.m.	**Louisiana-Monroe**	Tulane	Mercedes-Benz Superdome • New Orleans, LA	CST	**W** 63-10	18,063
September 29	2:30 p.m.	Troy	South Alabama	Ladd-Peebles Stadium • Mobile, AL	SBN	**Troy** 31-10	23,789
September 29	4:00 p.m.	North Texas	Florida Atlantic	FAU Stadium • Boca Raton, FL	ESPN3	**UNT** 20-14	13,888
September 29	6:00 p.m.	Florida International	Louisiana-Lafayette	Cajun Field • Lafayette, LA	ESPN3	**ULL** 48-20	21,109
September 29	6:00 p.m.	Western Kentucky	Arkansas State	ASU Stadium • Jonesboro, AR	ESPN3	**WKU** 26-16	25,160

Players of the week:

Offensive		Defensive		Special teams	
Player	Team	Player	Team	Player	Team
Benny Cunningham	Middle Tennessee	Quanterus Smith	Western Kentucky	Brett Baer (3)	Louisiana-Lafayette

=== Week 6 ===
Date	Time	Visiting team	Home team	Site	TV	Result	Attendance
October 4	6:30 p.m.	Arkansas State	Florida International	FIU Stadium • Miami, FL	ESPNU	**ASU** 34-20	13,612
October 6	2:30 p.m.	Louisiana-Monroe	Middle Tennessee	Johnny "Red" Floyd Stadium • Murfreesboro, TN	SBN	**ULM** 31-17	21,067
October 6	4:00 p.m.	Tulane	**Louisiana-Lafayette**	Cajun Field • Lafayette, LA	RCN/Cox4/ESPN3	**ULL** 41-13	29,758
October 6	6:00 p.m.	**North Texas**	Houston	Robertson Stadium • Houston, TX	CSS	**L** 21-44	25,476

Players of the week:

Offensive		Defensive		Special teams	
Player	Team	Player	Team	Player	Team
Kolton Browning (2)	Louisiana-Monroe	Qushaun Lee	Arkansas State	Brett Baer (4)	Louisiana-Lafayette

=== Week 7 ===
Date	Time	Visiting team	Home team	Site	TV	Result	Attendance
October 11	6:30 p.m.	Western Kentucky	Troy	Veterans Memorial Stadium • Troy, AL	ESPNU	**WKU** 31-26	16,426
October 13	5:00 p.m.	Middle Tennessee	Florida International	FIU Stadium • Miami, FL		**MT** 34-30	15,234
October 13	6:00 p.m.	South Alabama	Arkansas State	ASU Stadium • Jonesboro, AR		**ASU** 36-29	22,143
October 13	7:00 p.m.	Florida Atlantic	Louisiana-Monroe	Malone Stadium • Monroe, LA	SBN/CSS	**ULM** 35-14	16,782

Players of the week:

Offensive		Defensive		Special teams	
Player	Team	Player	Team	Player	Team
Benny Cunningham (2)	Middle Tennessee	Nathan Herrold	Arkansas State	Michel Chapuseaux	South Alabama

=== Week 8 ===
Date	Time	Visiting team	Home team	Site	TV	Result	Attendance
October 16	8:00 p.m.	Louisiana-Lafayette	North Texas	Apogee Stadium • Denton, TX	ESPN2	**UNT** 30-23	17,055
October 20	12:00 p.m.	Florida International	Troy	Veterans Memorial Stadium • Troy, AL	SBN/CSS	**Troy** 38-37	17,354
October 20	2:30 p.m.	Florida Atlantic	South Alabama	Ladd-Peebles Stadium • Mobile, AL		**USA** 37-34	17,566
October 20	3:00 p.m.	Louisiana-Monroe	Western Kentucky	Houchens Industries–L. T. Smith Stadium • Bowling Green, KY	ESPN3	**ULM** 43-42	22,323
October 20	6:00 p.m.	**Middle Tennessee**	Mississippi St	Davis Wade Stadium • Starkville, MS	ESPN2	**L** 3-45	55,108

Players of the week:

Offensive		Defensive		Special teams	
Player	Team	Player	Team	Player	Team
Kolton Browning (3)	Louisiana-Monroe	Zach Orr	North Texas	Pat Moore	South Alabama

=== Week 9 ===
Date	Time	Visiting team	Home team	Site	TV	Result	Attendance
October 23	7:00 p.m.	Arkansas State	Louisiana-Lafayette	Cajun Field • Lafayette, LA	ESPN2	**ASU** 50-27	19,873
October 27	2:30 p.m.	North Texas	Middle Tennessee	Johnny "Red" Floyd Stadium • Murfreesboro, TN	ESPN3	**MT** 38-21	14,102
October 27	4:00 p.m.	Troy	Florida Atlantic	FAU Stadium • Boca Raton, FL		**FAU** 34-27	11,968
October 27	5:00 p.m.	Western Kentucky	Florida International	FIU Stadium • Miami, FL	ESPN3	**WKU** 14-6	12,842
October 27	6:00 p.m.	South Alabama	Louisiana-Monroe	Malone Stadium • Monroe, LA		**ULM** 38-24	14,556

Players of the week:

Offensive		Defensive		Special teams	
Player	Team	Player	Team	Player	Team
Logan Kilgore	Middle Tennessee	Quanterus Smith (2)	Western Kentucky	Brian Davis	Arkansas State

=== Week 10 ===
Date	Time	Visiting team	Home team	Site	TV	Result	Attendance
November 1	8:15 p.m.	Middle Tennessee	Western Kentucky	Houchens Industries–L. T. Smith Stadium • Bowling Green, KY	ESPNU	**MT** 34-29	17,327
November 3	11:00 a.m.	Troy	Tennessee	Neyland Stadium • Knoxville, TN	SEC Regional	**L** 48-55	84,189
November 3	2:30 p.m.	Florida Atlantic	Navy	Navy–Marine Corps Memorial Stadium • Annapolis, MD	CBSSN	**L** 17-24	29,326
November 3	3:00 p.m.	Louisiana-Lafayette	Louisiana-Monroe	Malone Stadium • Monroe, LA	SBN/ESPN3	**ULL** 40-24	20,203
November 3	3:30 p.m.	Florida International	South Alabama	Ladd-Peebles Stadium • Mobile, AL		**FIU** 28-20	11,936
November 3	4:00 p.m.	Arkansas State	North Texas	Apogee Stadium • Denton, TX		**ASU** 37-19	17,534

Players of the week:

Offensive		Defensive		Special teams	
Player	Team	Player	Team	Player	Team
Terrance Broadway	Louisiana-Lafayette	Jordan Hunt	Florida International	Reggie Whatley	Middle Tennessee

=== Week 11 ===
Date	Time	Visiting team	Home team	Site	TV	Result	Attendance
November 8	6:00 p.m.	Louisiana-Monroe	Arkansas State	ASU Stadium • Jonesboro, AR	ESPNU	**ASU** 45-23	30,243
November 10	11:20 a.m.	Louisiana-Lafayette	Florida	Ben Hill Griffin Stadium • Gainesville, FL	SEC Regional	**L** 20-27	86,482
November 10	12:00 p.m.	Florida Atlantic	Western Kentucky	Houchens Industries–L. T. Smith Stadium • Bowling Green, KY	SBN	**FAU** 37-28	14,185
November 10	2:30 p.m.	Navy	Troy	Veterans Memorial Stadium • Troy, AL	ESPN3	**W** 41-31	24,321
November 10	4:30 p.m.	South Alabama	North Texas	Apogee Stadium • Denton, TX		**UNT** 24-14	15,963

Players of the week:

Offensive		Defensive		Special teams	
Player	Team	Player	Team	Player	Team
Ryan Aplin	Arkansas State	Emeka Onyenekwu	Louisiana-Lafayette	Will Scott (2)	Troy

=== Week 12 ===
Date	Time	Visiting team	Home team	Site	TV	Result	Attendance
November 16	7:00 p.m.	Florida International	Florida Atlantic	FAU Stadium • Boca Raton, FL	ESPNU	**FIU** 34-24	15,405
November 17	2:30 p.m.	Arkansas State	Troy	Veterans Memorial Stadium • Troy, AL	IMG Sports	**ASU** 41-34	20,614
November 17	2:30 p.m.	Middle Tennessee	South Alabama	Ladd-Peebles Stadium • Mobile, AL		**MT** 20-12	15,087
November 17	3:00 p.m.	North Texas	Louisiana-Monroe	Malone Stadium • Monroe, LA	ESPN3	**ULM** 42-16	14,079
November 17	6:00 p.m.	Western Kentucky	Louisiana-Lafayette	Cajun Field • Lafayette, LA	ESPN3	**ULL** 31-27	20,314

Players of the week:

Offensive		Defensive		Special teams	
Player	Team	Player	Team	Player	Team
Ryan Aplin (2)	Arkansas State	Jajuan Harley	Middle Tennessee	Richard Leonard	Florida International

=== Week 13 ===
Date	Time	Visiting team	Home team	Site	TV	Result	Attendance
November 24	12:00 p.m.	North Texas	Western Kentucky	Houchens Industries–L. T. Smith Stadium • Bowling Green, KY	SBN	**WKU** 25-24	11,074
November 24	2:30 p.m.	Troy	Middle Tennessee	Johnny "Red" Floyd Stadium • Murfreesboro, TN	ESPN3	**MT** 24-21	18,605
November 24	4:00 p.m.	South Alabama	Louisiana-Lafayette	Cajun Field • Lafayette, LA	RCN/ESPN3	**ULL** 52-30	20,333
November 24	TBD	Louisiana-Monroe	Florida International	FIU Stadium • Miami, FL		**ULM** 23-17	12,115

Players of the week:

Offensive		Defensive		Special teams	
Player	Team	Player	Team	Player	Team
Antonio Andrews (3)	Western Kentucky	Kevin Byard	Middle Tennessee	Michel Chapuseaux (2)	South Alabama

=== Week 14 ===
Date	Time	Visiting team	Home team	Site	TV	Result	Attendance
December 1	2:00 p.m.	Louisiana-Lafayette	Florida Atlantic	FAU Stadium • Boca Raton, FL		**ULL** 35-21	11,522
December 1	2:00 p.m.	Middle Tennessee	Arkansas State	ASU Stadium • Jonesboro, AR	ESPN3	**ASU** 45-0	31,243
December 1	6:00 p.m.	South Alabama	Hawaii	Aloha Stadium • Honolulu, HI	Root	**L** 7-23	27,865

Players of the week:

Offensive		Defensive		Special teams	
Player	Team	Player	Team	Player	Team
Ryan Aplin (3)	Arkansas State	Nathan Herrold (2)	Arkansas State	Brian Davis (2)	Arkansas State

== Bowl games ==
The Sun Belt placed four teams in bowl games with five teams bowl eligible in 2012. This was the highest number of SBC bowl teams in the conference's history. Only Middle Tennessee was not selected for a bowl. Two Sun Belt teams made their first bowl games in school history: Western Kentucky and Louisiana-Monroe.

NOTE: All times are local

Bowl	Date	Time	SBC team (Record)	Opponent (Record)	Site	TV	Result	Attendance
2012 R+L Carriers New Orleans Bowl	December 22	11:00 a.m.	Louisiana-Lafayette (8–4)	East Carolina (8–4)	Mercedes-Benz Superdome • New Orleans, LA	ESPN	W 43–34	48,828
2012 Little Caesars Pizza Bowl	December 26	6:30 p.m.	Western Kentucky (7–5)	Central Michigan (6–6)	Ford Field • Detroit, MI	ESPN	L 21–24	23,310
2012 Advocare V100 Independence Bowl	December 28	1:00 p.m.	Louisiana-Monroe (8–4)	Ohio (8–4)	Independence Stadium • Shreveport, LA	ESPN	L 14–45	41,853
2013 GoDaddy.com Bowl	January 6	8:00 p.m.	Arkansas State (9–3)	#25 Kent State (11–2)	Ladd-Peebles Stadium • Mobile, AL	ESPN	W 17–13	37,913

== Players of the Year ==
2012 Sun Belt Player of the Year awards

Award	Player	School
Player of the Year	Ryan Aplin	Arkansas State
Offensive Player of the Year	Kolton Browning	Louisiana-Monroe
Defensive Player of the Year	Quanterus Smith	Western Kentucky
Freshman of the Year	J. D. McKissic	Arkansas State
Coach of the Year	Todd Berry	Louisiana-Monroe

== All-Sun Belt Team ==
Coaches All-Conference Selections

Position	Player	Class	Team
First Team Offense
QB	Ryan Aplin	SR	Arkansas State
RB	David Oku	JR	Arkansas State
RB	Antonio Andrews	SR	Western Kentucky
WR	Brent Leonard	SR	Louisiana-Monroe
WR	Anthony Amos	SR	Middle Tennessee
WR	Chip Reeves	SR	Troy
TE	Jack Doyle	SR	Western Kentucky
OL	Zack McKnight	SR	Arkansas State
OL	Micah James	SR	Middle Tennessee
OL	Aaron Fortenberry	SS	North Texas
OL	Kyle Wilborn	SR	Troy
OL	Adam Smith	SR	Western Kentucky
First Team Defense
DL	Ryan Carrethers	JR	Arkansas State
DL	Tourek Williams	SR	Florida International
DL	Emeka Onyenekwu	SR	Louisiana-Lafayette
DL	Quanterus Smith	SR	Western Kentucky
LB	Nathan Herrold	SR	Arkansas State
LB	Jake Johnson	SR	South Alabama
LB	Andrew Jackson	JR	Western Kentucky
DB	Johnathan Cyprien	SR	Florida International
DB	Jemarlous Moten	SR	Louisiana-Lafayette
DB	Brynden Trawick	SR	Troy
DB	Jonathan Dowling	SO	Western Kentucky
First Team Special Teams
PK	Brett Baer	SR	Louisiana-Lafayette
P	Brett Baer	SR	Louisiana-Lafayette
RS	Reggie Whatley	SO	Middle Tennessee
AP	Antonio Andrews	JR	Western Kentucky

Position	Player	Class	Team
Second Team Offense
QB	Kolton Browning	JR	Louisiana-Monroe
RB	Benny Cunningham	SR	Middle Tennessee
RB	Shawn Southward	SR	Troy
WR	J. D. McKissic	FR	Arkansas State
WR	William Dukes	SO	Florida Atlantic
WR	Harry Peoples	SR	Louisiana-Lafayette
TE	Nexon Dorvilus	JR	Florida Atlantic
OL	Caylin Hauptmann	SR	Florida International
OL	Leonardo Bates	SR	Louisiana-Lafayette
OL	Jonathon Gill	SR	Louisiana-Monroe
OL	Andre Huval	JR	Louisiana-Lafayette
OL	Josh Allen	JR	Louisiana-Monroe
Second Team Defense
DL	Tim Starson	SR	Arkansas State
DL	Omar McLendon	SR	Middle Tennessee
DL	Alex Page	JR	South Alabama
DL	Tony Davis	SR	Troy
LB	R. J. Young	SR	Louisiana-Monroe
LB	Zach Orr	JR	North Texas
LB	Kanorris Davis	SR	Troy
DB	Brent Harstad	SR	Florida Atlantic
DB	Isaiah Newsome	JR	Louisiana-Monroe
DB	Kevin Byard	FR	Middle Tennessee
DB	Zac Whitfield	FR	North Texas
Second Team Special Teams
PK	Brian Davis	JR	Arkansas State
P	Will Atterberry	SR	North Texas
RS	Antonio Andrews	JR	Western Kentucky
AP	Deon Anthony	JR	Troy

== Home attendance ==
Team	Stadium (Capacity)	Game 1	Game 2	Game 3	Game 4	Game 5	Game 6	Total	Average	% of Capacity
Arkansas State	Liberty Bank Stadium (30,964)	28,041	21,559	25,160	22,143	30,243	31,243	158,389	26,398	85.3%
Florida Atlantic	FAU Stadium (30,000)	14,510	13,888	11,968	15,405	11,522		67,293	13,459	44.9%
Florida International	FIU Stadium (23,500)	15,685	12,318	13,612	15,234	12,842	12,115	81,806	13,634	58.0%
Louisiana–Lafayette	Cajun Field (31,000)	25,803	21,109	29,758	19,873	20,314	20,333	137,190	22,865	73.8%
Louisiana–Monroe	Malone Stadium (30,427)	31,175	16,782	14,556	20,203	14,079		96,795	19,359	63.6%
Middle Tennessee	Johnny "Red" Floyd Stadium (30,788)	18,690	16,227	21,067	14,102	18,605		88,691	17,738	57.6%
North Texas	Apogee Stadium (30,850)	22,259	21,823	17,055	17,534	15,963		94,634	18,927	61.4%
South Alabama	Ladd–Peebles Stadium (33,471)	17,144	15,237	23,789	17,566	11,936	15,087	100,759	16,793	50.2%
Troy	Veterans Memorial Stadium (30,000)	17,981	29,013	16,426	17,354	24,321	20,614	125,709	20,952	69.8%
Western Kentucky	Houchens Industries–L. T. Smith Stadium (22,000)	16,327	23,252	22,323	17,327	14,185	11,074	104,488	17,415	79.2%
