= 2011 Sun Belt Conference football season =

- League: NCAA Division I FBS (Football Bowl Subdivision)
- Sport: football
- Duration: September 1, 2011–January 8, 2012
- Teams: 9
- TV partner: ESPN

2012 NFL Draft
- Top draft pick: LB Demario Davis, Arkansas State
- Picked by: New York Jets, 77th overall

Regular season
- Season champions: Arkansas State
- Runners-up: Western Kentucky

Football seasons
- 2010 2012

2011 Sun Belt Conference football standings
	Conf.			Overall
Team	W		L	W		L
Arkansas State $	8	–	0	10	–	3
Western Kentucky	7	–	1	7	–	5
FIU	5	–	3	8	–	5
North Texas	4	–	4	5	–	7
Louisiana–Monroe	3	–	5	4	–	8
Troy	2	–	6	3	–	9
Louisiana–Lafayette *	1	–	2	1	–	4
Middle Tennessee	1	–	7	2	–	10
Florida Atlantic	0	–	8	1	–	11
$ – Conference champion; * – Louisiana–Lafayette vacated 8 wins including 5 in conference due to NCAA violations.

The 2011 Sun Belt Conference football season was the 11th season of college football play for the Sun Belt Conference. The season began September 1, 2011 and concluded January 8, 2012 as part of the 2011-12 NCAA Division I FBS football season. The 2011 season consisted of nine members: Arkansas State, Florida Atlantic, Florida International, Louisiana–Lafayette, Louisiana–Monroe, Middle Tennessee State, North Texas, Troy and Western Kentucky.

The 2011 season was last with nine football-playing members as South Alabama elevated their program from FCS to FBS to become the conference's tenth all-sports member for the 2012 season.

== Preseason ==
=== Award watch lists ===
The following Sun Belt players were named to preseason award watch lists.

Maxwell Award:

- Bobby Rainey – Western Kentucky

Chuck Bednarik Award:

- Jonathan Massaquoi – Troy

John Mackey Award:

- Jack Doyle – Western Kentucky
- Ladarius Green – Louisiana–Lafayette

Fred Biletnikoff Award:

- Dwayne Frampton – Arkansas State
- Ladarius Green – Louisiana–Lafayette

Bronko Nagurski Trophy:

- Jonathan Massaqoui – Troy

Outland Trophy:

- James Brown – Troy

Lombardi Award:

- Demario Davis – Arkansas State
- Jonathan Massaquoi – Troy

Rimington Trophy:

- Colin Boss – Middle Tennessee
- Tom Castilaw – Arkansas State

Davey O'Brien Award:

- Corey Robinson – Troy

Doak Walker Award:

- Alfred Morris – Florida Atlantic
- Bobby Rainey – Western Kentucky

Walter Camp Award:

- Jonathan Massaquoi – Troy

Lou Groza Award:

- Jake Griffin – Florida International

=== Sun Belt media days ===
During the Sun Belt media days on July 18–19 via videoconferencing, Florida International was selected as the favorite to win the conference in the coaches poll. They five first place votes. Troy received two first place votes while Arkansas State and Western Kentucky each received one.

==== Coaches Poll ====
1. Florida International – 75 (5)
2. Troy – 66 (2)
3. Middle Tennessee – 54
4. Louisiana–Monroe – 22
5. Arkansas State – 49 (1)
6. North Texas – 33
7. Western Kentucky – 28 (1)
8. Louisiana–Lafayette – 26
9. Florida Atlantic – 20

==== Preseason All–Conference Team ====
The conference's head coaches selected their all–conference team during media days.

Offense
QB Corey Robinson–Troy
RB Lance Dunbar–North Texas
RB Bobby Rainey–Western Kentucky
WR Dwayne Frampton–Arkansas State
WR T. Y. Hilton–FIU
WR Luther Ambrose–ULM
TE Ladarius Green–ULL
OL Tom Castilaw–Arkansas State
OL Caylin Hauptmann–FIU
OL Ryan McCaul–ULM
OL Matt Tomlinson–North Texas
OL James Brown–Troy
OL Wes Jeffries–Western Kentucky

Defense
DL Dorvus Woods–Arkansas State
DL Tourek Williams–FIU
DL Ken Dorsey–ULM
DL Jonathan Massaquoi–Troy
LB Demario Davis–Arkansas State
LB Winston Fraser–FIU
LB Xavier Lamb–Troy
DB Kelcie McCray–Arkansas State
DB Jonathan Cyprien–FIU
DB Marcus Bartels–FAU
DB Darius Prelow–ULM

Specialists
PK Alan Gendreau–Middle Tennessee
P Mickey Groody–FAU
KR T.Y. Hilton–FIU

The coaches also selected conference players of the year. T.Y. Hilton of Florida International and Lance Dunbar of North Texas were selected as the preseason co-offensive players of the year and Jonathan Massaquoi of Troy was named the preseason defensive player of the year.

== Coaches ==
NOTE: Stats shown are before the beginning of the season

Team	Head coach	Years at school	Overall record	Record at school	Sun Belt record
Arkansas State	Hugh Freeze	1	0–0	0–0	0–0
Florida Atlantic	Howard Schnellenberger	11	157–140–3	57–63	22–13
Florida International	Mario Cristobal	5	16–33	16–33	13–17
Louisiana–Lafayette	Mark Hudspeth	1	66–21	0–0	0–0
Louisiana–Monroe	Todd Berry	2	34–67	5–7	34–67
Middle Tennessee	Rick Stockstill	6	33–30	33–30	25–12
North Texas	Dan McCarney	1	58–85	0–0	0–0
Troy	Larry Blakeney	23	161–82–1	161–82–1	40–12
Western Kentucky	Willie Taggart	2	2–10	2–10	2–6

== Sun Belt vs. BCS matchups ==
Date	Visitor	Home	Notes
September 1^	Kentucky 14	Western Kentucky 3	Played at LP Field in Nashville, Tennessee
September 3	Arkansas State 15	Illinois 33	
September 3	Florida Atlantic 3	#23 Florida 41	
September 3	Louisiana–Lafayette 34	#8 Oklahoma State 61	
September 3	Louisiana–Monroe 0	#5 Florida State 34	
September 3	Middle Tennessee 24	Purdue 27	
September 3	Troy 19	Clemson 43	
September 9	Florida International 24	Louisville 17	FIU's first ever win against a BCS team
September 10	Florida Atlantic 0	Michigan State 44	
September 10	Georgia Tech 49	Middle Tennessee 21	
September 17	Arkansas State 7	#12 Virginia Tech 26	
September 17	North Texas 0	#2 Alabama 41	
September 17	Troy 28	#13 Arkansas 38	
September 24	Florida Atlantic 14	Auburn 30	
September 24	Louisiana–Monroe 17	Iowa 45	
September 24	Indiana 21	North Texas 24	
October 1	Duke 31	Florida International 27	
November 5	Middle Tennessee 0	Tennessee 24	
November 12	Western Kentucky 9	LSU 42	
November 26	Louisiana–Lafayette 37	Arizona 45	
^Denotes neutral site game

== Regular season ==
Index to colors and formatting
Sun Belt member won
Sun Belt member lost
Sun Belt teams in **bold**

All dates, times, and TV are tentative and subject to change.

The Sun Belt has teams in 2 different time zones. Times reflect start time in respective time zone of each team (all teams central time except for Florida Atlantic and Florida International which are in eastern time). Conference games start times are that of the home team.

Rankings reflect that of the USA Today Coaches poll for that week until week eight when the BCS poll will be used.

=== Week One ===
Date	Time	Visiting team	Home team	Site	TV	Result	Attendance
September 1	7:00 p.m.	**North Texas**	**Florida International**	FIU Stadium • Miami	ESPN3	**FIU** 41–16	17,568
September 1 ^	8:15 p.m.	Kentucky	**Western Kentucky**	LP Field • Nashville, Tennessee	ESPNU	**L** 3–14	24,599
September 3	11:00 a.m.	**Middle Tennessee**	Purdue	Ross–Ade Stadium • West Lafayette, Indiana	BTN	**L** 24–27	42,110
September 3	2:30 p.m.	**Arkansas State**	Illinois	Memorial Stadium • Champaign, Illinois	BTN	**L** 15–33	45,154
September 3	2:30 p.m.	**Louisiana–Monroe**	#5 Florida State	Bobby Bowden Field at Doak Campbell Stadium • Tallahassee, Florida	ESPNU	**L** 0–34	72,226
September 3	2:30 p.m.	**Troy**	Clemson	Memorial Stadium • Clemson, South Carolina	ESPN3	**L** 19–43	74,135
September 3	6:00 p.m.	**Louisiana–Lafayette**	#8 Oklahoma State	Boone Pickens Stadium • Stillwater, Oklahoma	FSN	**L** 34–61	55,382
September 3	7:00 p.m.	**Florida Atlantic**	#23 Florida	Ben Hill Griffin Stadium • Gainesville, Florida	ESPNU	**L** 3–41	88,708

^ Neutral site

Players of the week:

Offensive		Defensive		Special teams	
Player	Team	Player	Team	Player	Team
T.Y. Hilton	FIU	Eric Russell	Middle Tennessee	Hendrix Brakefield	Western Kentucky

=== Week Two ===
Date	Time	Visiting team	Home team	Site	TV	Result	Attendance
September 9	7:00 p.m.	**Florida International**	Louisville	Papa John's Cardinal Stadium • Louisville, Kentucky	ESPN	**W** 24–17	47,228
September 10	12:00 p.m.	**Florida Atlantic**	#16 Michigan State	Spartan Stadium • East Lansing, Michigan	ESPN2	**L** 0–44	70,249
September 10	6:00 p.m.	Memphis	**Arkansas State**	ASU Stadium • Jonesboro, Arkansas		**W** 47–3	29,872
September 10	6:00 p.m.	**Louisiana–Lafayette**	Kent State	Dix Stadium • Kent, Ohio		**W** 20–12	10,386
September 10	6:00 p.m.	Grambling State	**Louisiana–Monroe**	Malone Stadium • Monroe, Louisiana		**W** 35–7	26,532
September 10	6:00 p.m.	Georgia Tech	**Middle Tennessee**	Johnny "Red" Floyd Stadium • Murfreesboro, Tennessee	ESPN3	**L** 21–49	30,502
September 10	6:00 p.m.	Houston	**North Texas**	Apogee Stadium • Denton, Texas	ESPN3	**L** 23–48	28,075
September 10	6:00 p.m.	Navy	**Western Kentucky**	Houchens Industries–L. T. Smith Stadium • Bowling Green, Kentucky	ESPN3	**L** 14–40	19,409

Players of the week:

Offensive		Defensive		Special teams	
Player	Team	Player	Team	Player	Team
T.Y. Hilton (2)	FIU	Winston Fraser	FIU	Brelan Chancellor	North Texas

=== Week Three ===
Date	Time	Visiting team	Home team	Site	TV	Result	Attendance
September 17	1:00 p.m.	**Louisiana–Monroe**	#23 TCU	Amon G. Carter Stadium • Fort Worth, Texas	The Mtn.	**L** 17–38	32,719
September 17	3:00 p.m.	**Arkansas State**	#12 Virginia Tech	Lane Stadium • Blacksburg, Virginia	FSN	**L** 7–26	66,233
September 17	6:00 p.m.	UCF	**Florida International**	FIU Stadium • Miami, Florida	ESPN3	**W** 17–10	20,205
September 17	6:00 p.m.	Nicholls State	**Louisiana–Lafayette**	Cajun Field • Lafayette, Louisiana	ESPN3	**W** 38–21	28,741
September 17	6:00 p.m.	Indiana State	**Western Kentucky**	Houchens Industries–L. T. Smith Stadium • Bowling Green, Kentucky	ESPN3	**L** 16–44	15,793
September 17	6:30 p.m.	**North Texas**	#2 Alabama	Bryant–Denny Stadium • Tuscaloosa, Alabama	FSN	**L** 0–41	101,821
September 17	6:30 p.m.	**Troy**	#13 Arkansas	Donald W. Reynolds Razorback Stadium • Fayetteville, Arkansas	CSS	**L** 28–38	69,861

Players of the week:

Offensive		Co-Defensive		Special teams	
Player	Team	Players	Teams	Player	Team
Corey Robinson	Troy	Isame Faciane/LaDarrius Madden	FIU/Troy	Melvin White	Louisiana–Lafayette

=== Week Four ===
Date	Time	Visiting team	Home team	Site	TV	Result	Attendance
September 24	11:00 a.m.	**Louisiana–Monroe**	Iowa	Kinnick Stadium • Iowa City, Iowa	BTN	**L** 17–45	70,585
September 24	3:30 p.m.	**Middle Tennessee**	**Troy**	Veterans Memorial Stadium • Troy, Alabama (Battle for the Palladium)	Sun Belt Network	**TROY** 38–35	20,185
September 24	6:00 p.m.	**Louisiana–Lafayette**	**Florida International**	FIU Stadium • Miami, Florida	ESPN3	**ULL** 36–31	16,780
September 24	6:00 p.m.	**Florida Atlantic**	Auburn	Jordan–Hare Stadium • Auburn, Alabama	FS South	**L** 14–30	82,249
September 24	6:00 p.m.	Indiana	**North Texas**	Apogee Stadium • Denton, Texas	ESPN3	**W** 24–21	21,181
September 24	7:00 p.m.	Central Arkansas	**Arkansas State**	ASU Stadium • Jonesboro, Arkansas	KATV	**W** 53–24	27,918

Players of the week:

Offensive		Defensive		Special teams	
Player	Team	Player	Team	Player	Team
Blaine Gautier	Louisiana–Lafayette	Chris Pickett	Troy	Brian David	Arkansas State

Arkansas State kicker Brian David was also named one of three Lou Groza Award Stars of the Week and the College Football Performance Awards' National Placekicker of the Week after going making 6 field goals and 5 extra points in the Red Wolves win over Central Arkansas.

=== Week Five ===
Date	Time	Visiting team	Home team	Site	TV	Result	Attendance
October 1	3:00 p.m.	**Arkansas State**	**Western Kentucky**	Houchens Industries–L. T. Smith Stadium • Bowling Green, Kentucky	Sun Belt Network	**ASU** 26–22	10,813
October 1	6:00 p.m.	**Florida Atlantic**	**Louisiana–Lafayette**	Cajun Field • Lafayette, Louisiana	ESPN3	**ULL** 37–34	26,339
October 1	6:00 p.m.	Duke	**Florida International**	FIU Stadium • Miami, Florida	ESPNU	**L** 27–31	22,682
October 1	6:00 p.m.	Memphis	**Middle Tennessee**	Johnny "Red" Floyd Stadium • Murfreesboro, Tennessee	ESPN3	**W** 38–31	20,098
October 1	6:00 p.m.	**North Texas**	Tulsa	Skelly Field at H. A. Chapman Stadium • Tulsa, Oklahoma		**L** 24–41	21,240
October 1	6:00 p.m.	UAB	**Troy**	Veterans Memorial Stadium • Troy, Alabama	SportSouth	**W** 24–23	18,044

Players of the week:

Offensive		Defensive		Special teams	
Player	Team	Player	Team	Player	Team
Ryan Aplin	Arkansas State	Lance Kelley	Louisiana-Lafayette	Brett Baer	Louisiana-Lafayette

Louisiana-Lafayette kicker Brett Baer was also named one of the Lou Groza Award Stars of the Week after making 3 field goals including the game winner as time expired. He also made 4 extra points in the Cajuns win over Florida Atlantic.

=== Week Six ===
Date	Time	Visiting team	Home team	Site	TV	Result	Attendance
October 6	6:30 p.m.	**Western Kentucky**	**Middle Tennessee**	Johnny "Red" Floyd Stadium • Murfreesboro, Tennessee	ESPNU	**WKU** 36–33	23,307
October 8	6:00 p.m.	**Troy**	**Louisiana–Lafayette**	Cajun Field • Lafayette, Louisiana	ESPN3	**ULL** 31–17	29,775
October 8	6:00 p.m.	**Arkansas State**	**Louisiana–Monroe**	Malone Stadium • Monroe, Louisiana		**ASU** 24–19	15,027
October 8	6:30 p.m.	**Florida Atlantic**	**North Texas**	Apogee Stadium • Denton, Texas	Sun Belt Network	**UNT** 31–17	13,142
October 8	2:00 p.m.	**Florida International**	Akron	InfoCision Stadium – Summa Field • Akron, Ohio		**W** 27–17	16,016

Players of the week:

Offensive		Defensive		Special teams	
Player	Team	Player	Team	Player	Team
Chris Masson	Louisiana-Lafayette	Kelcie McCray	Arkansas State	Don Jones	Arkansas State

=== Week Seven ===
Date	Time	Visiting team	Home team	Site	TV	Result	Attendance
October 15	4:00 p.m.	**Western Kentucky**	**Florida Atlantic**	FAU Football Stadium • Boca Raton, Florida		**WKU** 20–0	29,103
October 15	4:00 p.m.	**North Texas**	**Louisiana–Lafayette**	Cajun Field • Lafayette, Louisiana	ESPN3	**ULL** 30–10	32,823
October 15	6:00 p.m.	**Louisiana–Monroe**	**Troy**	Veterans Memorial Stadium • Troy, Alabama	ESPN3	**ULM** 38–10	19,818

Players of the week:

Offensive		Defensive		Special teams	
Player	Team	Player	Team	Player	Team
Kolton Browning	Louisiana-Monroe	Lance Kelley (2)	Louisiana-Lafayette	Mitchell Bailey	Louisiana-Monroe

=== Week Eight ===
Date	Time	Visiting team	Home team	Site	TV	Result	Attendance
October 18	7:00 p.m.	**Florida International**	**Arkansas State**	ASU Stadium • Jonesboro, Arkansas	ESPN2	**ASU** 34–16	15,573
October 22	3:00 p.m.	**Louisiana–Lafayette**	**Western Kentucky**	Houchens Industries–L. T. Smith Stadium • Bowling Green, Kentucky		**WKU** 42–23	15,122
October 22	4:00 p.m.	**Louisiana–Monroe**	**North Texas**	Apogee Stadium • Denton, Texas		**UNT** 38–21	17,815
October 22	8:00 p.m.	**Middle Tennessee**	**Florida Atlantic**	FAU Stadium • Boca Raton, Florida	Sun Belt Network	**MTSU** 38–14	16,344

Players of the week:

Offensive		Defensive		Special teams	
Player	Team	Player	Team	Player	Team
Bobby Rainey	Western Kentucky	Eric Russell	Middle Tennessee	Luther Ambrose	Louisiana-Monroe

=== Week Nine ===
Date	Time	Visiting team	Home team	Site	TV	Result	Attendance
October 25	8:00 p.m.	**Troy**	**Florida International**	FIU Stadium • Miami	ESPN2	**FIU** 23–20 ^{OT}	15,852
October 29	2:30 p.m.	**Western Kentucky**	**Louisiana–Monroe**	Malone Stadium • Monroe, Louisiana		**WKU** 31–28 ^{OT}	13,428
October 29	6:00 p.m.	**North Texas**	**Arkansas State**	ASU Stadium • Jonesboro, Arkansas		**ASU** 37–14	19,761
October 29	6:30 p.m.	**Louisiana–Lafayette**	**Middle Tennessee**	Johnny "Red" Floyd Stadium • Murfreesboro, Tennessee	Sun Belt Network	**ULL** 45–20	13,500

Players of the week:

Offensive		Defensive		Special teams	
Player	Team	Player	Team	Player	Team
Alonzo Harris	Louisiana-Lafayette	Melvin White	Louisiana-Lafayette	Jack Griffin	FIU

=== Week Ten ===
Date	Time	Visiting team	Home team	Site	TV	Result	Attendance
November 5	2:30 p.m.	**Troy**	Navy	Navy–Marine Corps Memorial Stadium • Annapolis, Maryland	CBS Sports Network	**L** 14–42	33,359
November 5	6:00 p.m.	**Middle Tennessee**	Tennessee	Neyland Stadium • Knoxville, Tennessee	Fox Sports South	**L** 0–24	88,211
November 5	2:30 p.m.	**Louisiana–Monroe**	**Louisiana–Lafayette**	Cajun Field • Lafayette, Louisiana	Sun Belt Network	**ULL** 36–35	28,176
November 5	3:00 p.m.	**Florida International**	**Western Kentucky**	Houchens Industries–L. T. Smith Stadium • Bowling Green, Kentucky		**WKU** 10–9	15,293
November 5	6:00 p.m.	**Arkansas State**	**Florida Atlantic**	FAU Stadium • Boca Raton, Florida		**ASU** 39–21	15,162

Players of the week:

Offensive		Defensive		Special teams	
Player	Team	Player	Team	Player	Team
Ryan Aplin (2)	Arkansas State	Devon Lewis-Buchanon	Louisiana-Lafayette	Brett Baer (2)	Louisiana-Lafayette

=== Week Eleven ===
Date	Time	Visiting team	Home team	Site	TV	Result	Attendance
November 12	6:00 p.m.	**Western Kentucky**	#1 LSU	Tiger Stadium • Baton Rouge, Louisiana	ESPNU	**L** 9–42	92,917
November 12	12:00 p.m.	**North Texas**	**Troy**	Veterans Memorial Stadium • Troy, Alabama	Sun Belt Network	**UNT** 38-33	17,103
November 12	2:00 p.m.	**Louisiana-Lafayette**	**Arkansas State**	ASU Stadium • Jonesboro, Arkansas	ESPN3	**ASU** 30-21	20,261
November 12	2:30 p.m.	**Middle Tennessee**	**Louisiana-Monroe**	Malone Stadium • Monroe, Louisiana		**ULM** 42-14	11,987
November 12	5:00 p.m.	**Florida Atlantic**	**Florida International**	FIU Stadium • Miami		**FIU** 41-7	17,378

Players of the week:

Offensive		Defensive		Special teams	
Player	Team	Player	Team	Player	Team
Derek Thompson	North Texas	Brandon Joiner	Arkansas State	T.Y. Hilton (3)	Florida International

=== Week Twelve ===
Date	Time	Visiting team	Home team	Site	TV	Result	Attendance
November 19	2:00 p.m.	**Arkansas State**	**Middle Tennessee**	Johnny "Red" Floyd Stadium • Murfreesboro, Tennessee	ESPN3	**ASU** 45-19	12,806
November 19	2:30 p.m.	**Florida Atlantic**	**Troy**	Veterans Memorial Stadium • Troy, Alabama		**Troy** 34-7	14,342
November 19	4:00 p.m.	**Florida International**	**Louisiana-Monroe**	Malone Stadium • Monroe, Louisiana		**FIU** 28-17	10,587
November 19	6:00 p.m.	**Western Kentucky**	**North Texas**	Apogee Stadium • Denton, Texas	Sun Belt Network	**WKU** 31-21	17,011

Players of the week:

Offensive		Defensive		Special teams	
Player	Team	Player	Team	Player	Team
Bobby Rainey (2)	Western Kentucky	Jonathan Cyprien	Florida International	Luther Ambrose (2)	Louisiana-Monroe

=== Week Thirteen ===
Date	Time	Visiting team	Home team	Site	TV	Result	Attendance
November 26	11:30 p.m.	**Troy**	**Western Kentucky**	Houchens Industries–L. T. Smith Stadium • Bowling Green, Kentucky	Sun Belt Network	**WKU** 41-18	15,432
November 26	2:30 p.m.	**Florida International**	**Middle Tennessee**	Johnny "Red" Floyd Stadium • Murfreesboro, Tennessee		**FIU** 31-18	10,227
November 26	3:00 p.m.	**Louisiana-Lafayette**	Arizona	Arizona Stadium • Tucson, Arizona		**L** 37-45	38,819
November 26	3:00 p.m.	UAB	**Florida Atlantic**	FAU Stadium • Boca Raton, Florida		**W** 38-35	12,044

Players of the week:

Offensive		Defensive		Special teams	
Player	Team	Player	Team	Player	Team
Bobby Rainey (3)	Western Kentucky	Jemarlous Moten	Louisiana-Lafayette	Brett Baer (3)	Louisiana-Lafayette

== Bowl games ==
The Sun Belt placed 3 teams in bowl games with 4 teams being bowl eligible in 2011. Western Kentucky was the only bowl eligible team not selected.

NOTE: All times are local.

Bowl	Date	Time	SBC team (Record)	Opponent (Record)	Site	TV	Result	Attendance
2011 R+L Carriers New Orleans Bowl	December 17	7:00 p.m.	Louisiana-Lafayette (8-4)	San Diego State (8-4)	Mercedes-Benz Superdome • New Orleans	ESPN	W 32-30	42,841
2011 Beef O'Brady's Bowl St. Petersburg	December 20	8:00 p.m.	Florida International (8-4)	Marshall (6-6)	Ford Field • Detroit	ESPN	L 10-20	20,072
2012 GoDaddy.com Bowl	January 8	8:00 p.m.	Arkansas State (10-2)	Northern Illinois (10-3)	Ladd–Peebles Stadium • Mobile, Alabama	ESPN	L 20-38	38,734

== Players of the Year ==
2011 Sun Belt Player of the Year awards

Award	Player	School
Player of the Year	Ryan Aplin	Arkansas State
Offensive Player of the Year	Bobby Rainey	Western Kentucky
Defensive Player of the Year	Brandon Joiner	Arkansas State
Freshman of the Year	Alonzo Harris	Louisiana-Lafayette
Coach of the Year	Hugh Freeze	Arkansas State

== All-Sun Belt Team ==
Coaches All-Conference Selections

Position	Player	Class	Team
First Team Offense
QB	Ryan Aplin	JR	Arkansas State
RB	Lance Dunbar	SR	North Texas
RB	Bobby Rainey	SR	Western Kentucky
WR	T. Y. Hilton	SR	Florida International
WR	Dwayne Frampton	SR	Arkansas State
WR	Javone Lawson	JR	Louisiana-Lafayette
TE	Ladarius Green	SR	Louisiana-Lafayette
OL	Tom Castilaw	SR	Arkansas State
OL	Colin Boss	SR	Middle Tennessee
OL	Matt Tomlinson	SR	North Texas
OL	Wes Jeffries	SR	Western Kentucky
OL	James Brown	SR	Troy
First Team Defense
DL	Brandon Joiner	SR	Arkansas State
DL	Bernard Smith	SR	Louisiana-Lafayette
DL	Jonathan Massaquoi	JR	Troy
DL	Ken Dorsey	SR	Louisiana-Monroe
LB	Demario Davis	SR	Arkansas State
LB	Lance Kelley	SR	Louisiana-Lafayette
LB	Andrew Jackson	SO	Western Kentucky
DB	Darryl Feemster	SR	Arkansas State
DB	Kelcie McCray	SR	Arkansas State
DB	Bill Bentley	SR	Louisiana-Lafayette
DB	Darius Prelow	SR	Louisiana-Monroe
First Team Special Teams
PK	Jack Griffin	JR	Florida International
P	Will Atterberry	JR	North Texas
RS	T. Y. Hilton	SR	Florida International
AP	T. Y. Hilton	SR	Florida International

Position	Player	Class	Team
Second Team Offense
QB	Blaine Gautier	JR	Louisiana-Lafayette
RB	Alfred Morris	SR	Florida Atlantic
RB	Kedrick Rhodes	SO	Florida International
WR	Josh Jarboe	JR	Arkansas State
WR	Brent Leonard	JR	Louisiana-Monroe
WR	Eric Thomas	SO	Troy
TE	Jack Doyle	JR	Western Kentucky
OL	Delano Moore	SR	Arkansas State
OL	Caylin Hauptmann	JR	Florida International
OL	Leonardo Bates	JR	Louisiana-Lafayette
OL	Brandon McLeroy	SR	Middle Tennessee
OL	Adam Smith	JR	Western Kentucky
Second Team Defense
DL	Dorvus Woods	SR	Arkansas State
DL	Tourek Williams	JR	Florida International
DL	Brandon Akpunku	SR	North Texas
DL	Quanterus Smith	JR	Western Kentucky
LB	Nathan Herrold	JR	Arkansas State
LB	Winston Fraser	JR	Florida International
LB	Zach Orr	SO	North Texas
DB	Darron Edwards	SR	Arkansas State
DB	Johnathan Cyprien	JR	Florida International
DB	Brynden Trawick	JR	Troy
DB	Derrius Brooks	SR	Western Kentucky
Second Team Special Teams
PK	Brett Baer	JR	Louisiana-Lafayette
P	Brett Baer	JR	Louisiana-Lafayette
RS	Luther Ambrose	SR	Louisiana-Monroe
AP	Dwayne Frampton	SR	Arkansas State

== Home attendance ==
Team	Stadium (Capacity)	Game 1	Game 2	Game 3	Game 4	Game 5	Game 6	Total	Average	% of Capacity
Arkansas State	ASU Stadium (30,964)	29,872	27,918	15,573	19,761	20,261		113,385	22,677	73.2%
Florida Atlantic	FAU Football Stadium (30,000)	29,103	16,344	15,162	12,044			72,652	18,163	60.5%
FIU	FIU Stadium (23,500)	17,568	20,205	16,780	22,682	15,852	17,378	110,465	18,411	78.3%
Louisiana–Lafayette	Cajun Field (31,000)	28,741	26,339	29,775	32,823	28,176		145,854	29,171	94.1%
Louisiana–Monroe	Malone Stadium (30,427)	26,532	15,027	13,428	11,987	10,587		77,561	15,512	51.0%
Middle Tennessee	Johnny "Red" Floyd Stadium (30,788)	30,502	20,098	23,307	13,500	12,806	10,277	110,490	18,415	59.8%
North Texas	Apogee Stadium (30,850)	28,075	21,181	13,142	17,815	17,011		97,224	19,445	63.0%
Troy	Veterans Memorial Stadium (30,000)	20,185	18,044	19,818	17,103	14,342		89,492	17,898	59.7%
Western Kentucky	Houchens Industries–L. T. Smith Stadium (22,000)	19,409	15,793	10,813	15,122	15,293	15,432	91,862	15,310	69.6%
