= Quanterus Smith =

American football player (born 1989)

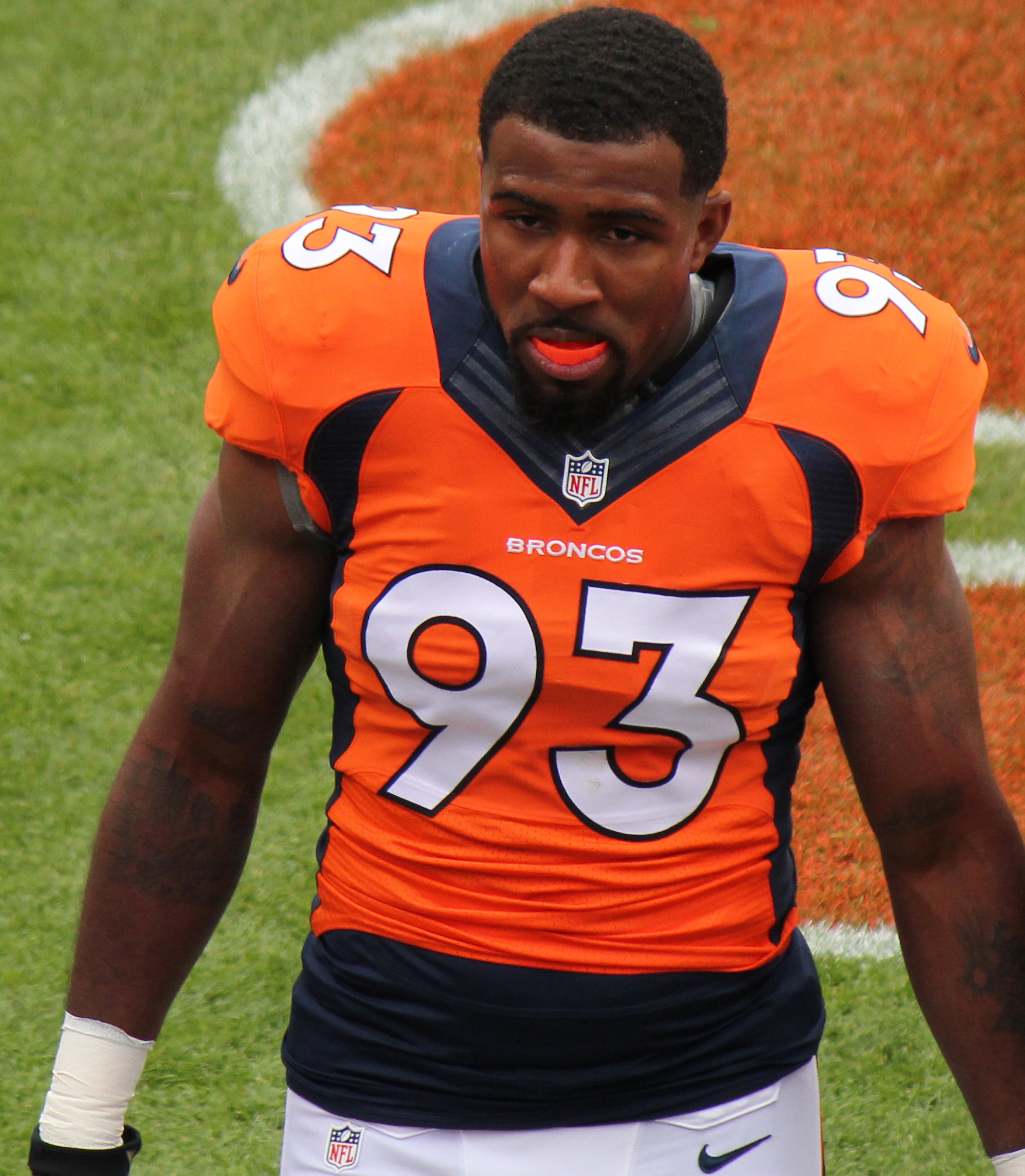
- Smith with the Denver Broncos in 2014

No. 93
- Position: Defensive end

Personal information
- Born: November 26, 1989 (age 36); Decatur, Georgia, U.S.
- Listed height: 6 ft 5 in (1.96 m)
- Listed weight: 250 lb (113 kg)

Career information
- High school: Grayson (Loganville, Georgia)
- College: Western Kentucky
- NFL draft: 2013: 5th round, 146th overall pick

Career history
- Denver Broncos (2013–2014); New York Jets (2015)*; Jacksonville Jaguars (2015–2016)*; Detroit Lions (2016)*
- * Offseason or practice squad member only

Awards and highlights
- Sun Belt Defensive Player of the Year (2012); First-team All-Sun Belt (2012); Second-team All-Sun Belt (2011)

Career NFL statistics
- Total tackles: 11
- Pass deflections: 2
- Stats at Pro Football Reference

Quanterus Smith (born November 26, 1989) is an American former professional football player who was a defensive end in the National Football League (NFL). He played college football for the Western Kentucky Hilltoppers. Smith was selected by the Denver Broncos in the fifth round of the 2013 NFL draft.

== Early life ==
Smith attended Grayson High School in Loganville, Georgia. He earned First-team All-County honors while at high school. He also was lettered in Basketball for the Grayson Rams Basketball team.

== College career ==
He was selected to Phil Steele's all-Sun Belt Conference third-team following his Sophomore season. He finished his Sophomore season with 47 tackles, 4 sacks, 2 pass deflections, and 2 forced fumbles. He finished his Junior season with a total of 38 tackles, 7.5 sacks. On November 19, 2012, he suffered a torn ACL in his left knee during a regular season game against Louisiana-Lafayette and would miss the remainder of his senior season. Following the conclusion of his Senior season on December 5, 2012, he was named Sun Belt Defensive Player of The Year for his outstanding breakout season in which he recorded 38 Tackles, Career High 12.5 Sacks, one pass deflection, one fumble recovery in which returned 75 yards for a touchdown and 3 Forced fumbles. He finished college with a total of 135 Tackles, 24 Sacks, 3 Pass Deflections and 5 Forced fumbles.

== Professional career ==
=== Denver Broncos ===
Smith was selected in the fifth round, 146th overall by the Denver Broncos in the 2013 NFL draft. On May 10, 2013, Smith signed his rookie contract. On August 31, 2013, he was placed on injured reserve with an ACL injury. On April 28, 2015, Smith was waived.

=== New York Jets ===
On October 28, 2015, Smith was signed to the practice squad of the New York Jets. On November 19, 2015, he was released.

=== Jacksonville Jaguars ===
On November 23, 2015, Smith was signed to the practice squad of the Jacksonville Jaguars.

=== Detroit Lions ===
On July 20, 2016, Smith signed to the Detroit Lions. On August 29, 2016, Smith was waived by the Lions.

He participated in The Spring League in 2017.

== Personal life ==
On August 15, 2017, Smith was charged with armed robbery after he and a friend robbed an AT&T store at gun point and led police on a high speed chase in Douglas County, Georgia.
