= Sprayberry High School =

Public secondary school in Marietta, Georgia, United States

Location
- 2525 Sandy Plains Road; Marietta, Georgia; United States; 34°00′43″N 84°29′49″W

Information
- Type: Public high school
- Established: 1952; 74 years ago
- School district: Cobb County School District
- Principal: David Church
- Teaching staff: 108.00 (FTE)
- Grades: 9–12
- Enrollment: 1,799 (2023-2024)
- Student to teacher ratio: 16.66
- Campus: Suburban
- Colors: Black and gold
- Nickname: Yellow Jackets
- Rival: Lassiter and Pope High school
- Website: www.cobbk12.org/sprayberry

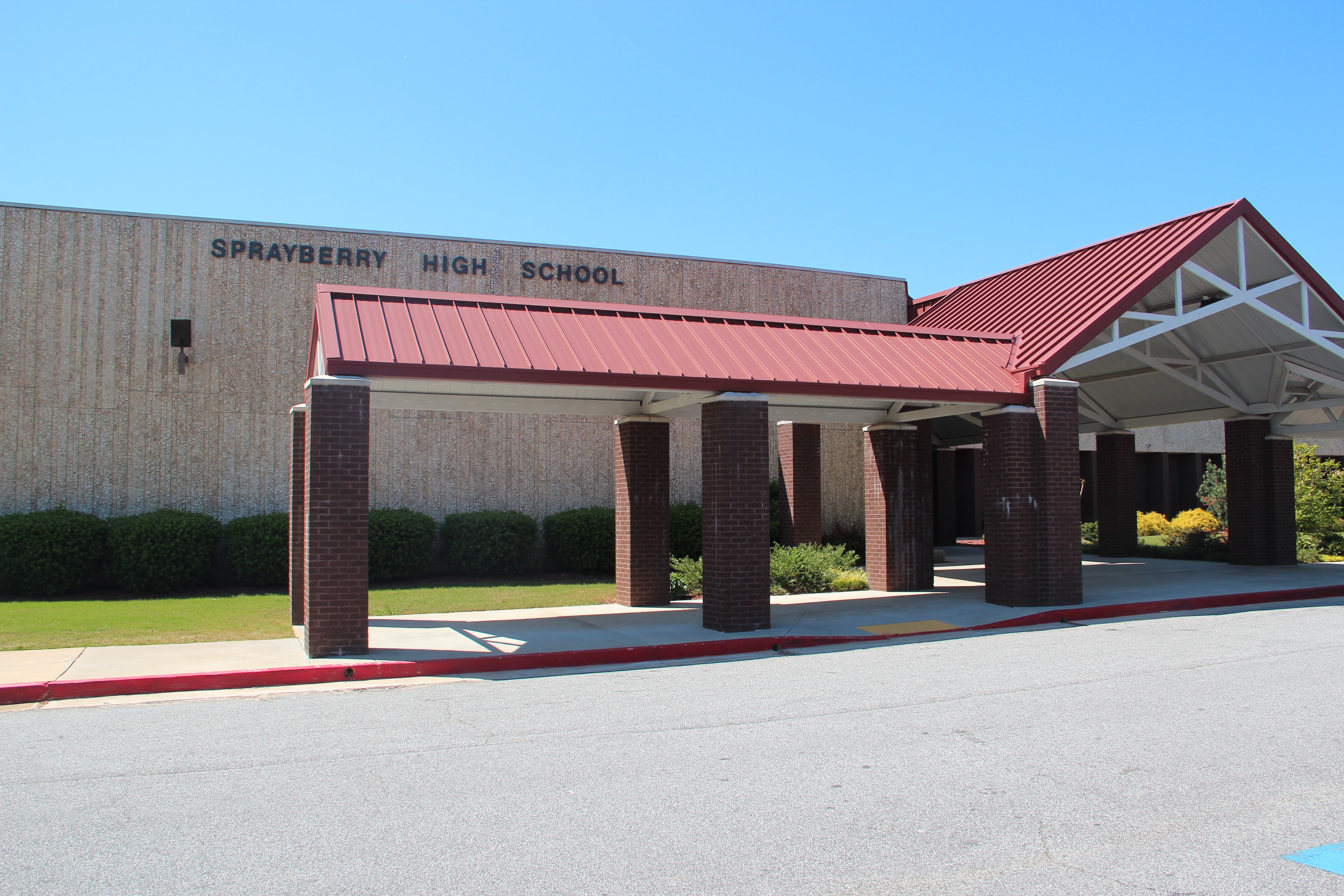
Front entrance to Sprayberry High School

Sprayberry High School is a public high school located in unincorporated northeastern Cobb County, Georgia, United States, a north-northwestern suburb of metro Atlanta, with a Marietta post office address. It is a comprehensive senior high school (grades 9–12) with approximately 1700 students. It opened in 1952 and moved to its current location at 2525 Sandy Plains Road in 1973. Sprayberry is a microcosm of Cobb County in that it serves students from a variety of ethnic groups, religions, socio-economic levels, and academic abilities. Middle schools feeding upcoming students into Sprayberry are McCleskey, Daniell, and Simpson in the Cobb County School District. The school's teams are called the Yellowjackets.

== History ==
Sprayberry High School opened to students the day after Labor Day in 1952. It was founded in the building now occupied by The Walker School (a private school), on Cobb Parkway (U.S. 41) at the north corner of Allgood Road.

Sprayberry is now located on the west corner of Sandy Plains Road at Piedmont Road. The exposed-aggregate concrete and dark brick of the original building is an example of the brutalist architecture common at the time.

Since then, the area historically known as Sandy Plains has now come to be known as Sprayberry, stretching somewhat northeast from the intersection to Post Oak Tritt Road, and to the Sprayberry post office at Ebenezer Road. Several strip malls and other businesses bear the name.

The campus football stadium was one of a few local schools' used in filming Remember the Titans, released in 2000.

== Academics ==
Sprayberry High School is known for its academics and programs in the arts. It has been named a National School of Excellence and Georgia School of Excellence twice, an accomplishment made by only two other schools. It has been recognized by Newsweek and the Washington Post as one of the top 5% of high schools in the nation five years in a row. The school's SAT and ACT scores have remained well above the national average, with students continuously achieving above state average scores in all GHSGT subject areas. Georgia High School Graduation Test scores in the 2010–2011 school year were the highest in school history. Sprayberry has met AYP for the past eight years, and since 2005, Sprayberry has been a Demonstration level Advanced Placement Certified School with over 20 Advanced Placement courses.

== Sports ==
- Baseball
- Boys' basketball 2023 7AAAAAA Region Champions
- Girls' basketball
- Cheerleading
- Cross country
- Fast pitch softball
- Football - 2008 7AAAA Region Champions; 2024 6AAAAA Region Champions
- Golf
- Boys' lacrosse
- Girls' lacrosse
- Soccer
- Swimming
- Tennis
- Track
- Volleyball
- Wrestling

Sprayberry High School's football stadium (Jim Frazier Stadium) was used in part of the movie Remember the Titans.

== Music ==
- Band of Gold
- Orchestra
- Chorus

Sprayberry High School's band program has also hosted the Southern Invitational Music Festival. Marching bands from all across the Southeast compete and perform while Sprayberry performs in exhibition.

== Publications ==
- Sprayberry's Vox Humana

== Notable alumni ==
- Marcus Bagwell - professional wrestler under the ring name Buff Bagwell (Class of 1988)
- Kris Benson - baseball player, Baltimore Orioles (Class of 1993)
- Rodrigo Blankenship - football player, Birmingham Stallions (Class of 2015)
- Marlon Byrd - baseball player, Philadelphia Phillies (Class of 1995)
- Michael Chavis - baseball player, Chicago White Sox (Class of 2014)
- Costaki Economopoulos - comedian
- Flau'jae Johnson - basketball player, Louisiana State University and a rapper who appeared on the TV shows The Rap Game and America's Got Talent where on AGT became the first rapper in history to receive the Golden Buzzer (Class of 2022)
- Michelle Malone - musician
- Christopher Martin - Principal Trumpet, New York Philharmonic
- Jerick McKinnon - football player, Kansas City Chiefs (Class of 2010)
- Jim Nash - baseball player, Kansas City Athletics
- Chuck Nevitt - former NBA player
- Ty Pennington - TV personality
- Jimmy Rave - professional wrestler
- Rick Richards - lead guitarist of the Georgia Satellites and the Ju-Ju Hounds
- Trey Sermon - NFL running back for the Indianapolis Colts (Class of 2017)
- Parvati Shallow - contestant on Survivor: Cook Islands and Survivor: Micronesia
- Brynden Trawick - former football player, Tennessee Titans (Class of 2008)
- Travis Tritt - country musician
- Austin Watson - professional wrestler for the WWE under the ring name Xavier Woods
- Kevin Young - Head coach of BYU Cougars men's basketball (Class of 2000)
- Jabari Zuniga - former NFL player, New York Jets (Class of 2015)
