= Jack Doyle (American football) =

American football player (born 1990)

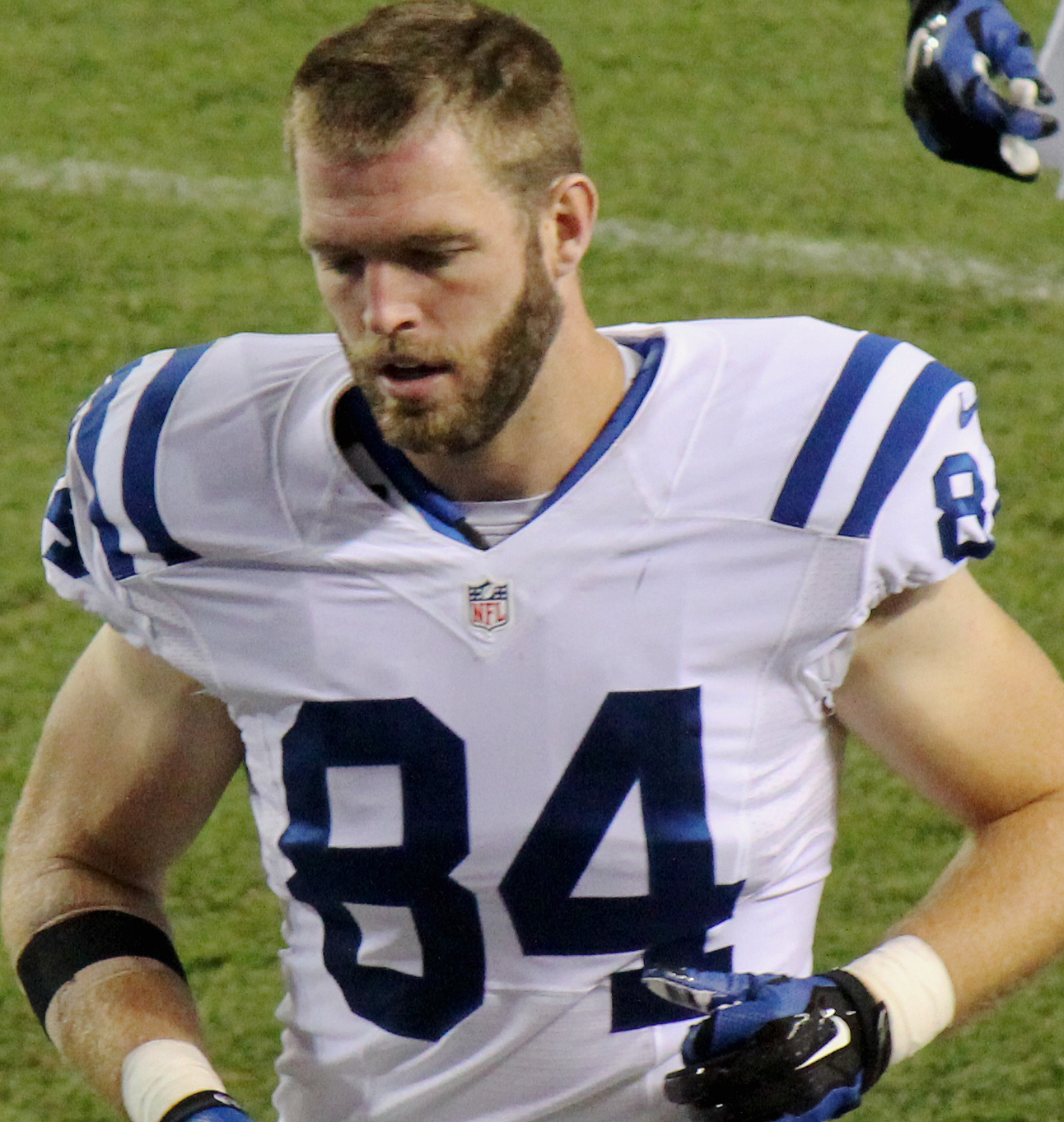
- Doyle with the Indianapolis Colts in 2014

No. 84
- Position: Tight end

Personal information
- Born: May 5, 1990 (age 36); Indianapolis, Indiana, U.S.
- Listed height: 6 ft 6 in (1.98 m)
- Listed weight: 262 lb (119 kg)

Career information
- High school: Cathedral (Indianapolis, Indiana)
- College: Western Kentucky (2009–2012)
- NFL draft: 2013: undrafted

Career history
- Tennessee Titans (2013)*; Indianapolis Colts (2013–2021)
- * Offseason or practice squad member only

Awards and highlights
- 2× Pro Bowl (2017, 2019); First-team All-Sun Belt (2012); Second-team All-Sun Belt (2011)

Career NFL statistics
- Receptions: 295
- Receiving yards: 2,729
- Receiving average: 9.3
- Receiving touchdowns: 24
- Stats at Pro Football Reference

John Glenn Doyle (born May 5, 1990) is an American former professional football player who was a tight end in the National Football League (NFL). He played college football for the Western Kentucky Hilltoppers and signed with the Tennessee Titans as an undrafted free agent in 2013. However, Doyle was waived before the beginning of the season and was then acquired by the Indianapolis Colts, where he spent his entire nine-year professional career and was a two-time Pro Bowl selection.

== Early life ==
At Cathedral High School, Doyle was All-State and earned Honorable Mention All-State honors. He was a member of the football team that won the championship in 2006. As a senior, he caught 21 passes for 400 yards and four touchdowns and earned an Indianapolis Star Honorable Mention. In addition to football, Doyle played basketball, lettered in rugby and won a state title in 2008.

== College career ==
Western Kentucky was the only Football Bowl Subdivision program to offer Doyle an athletic scholarship. As a freshman in 2009, he started 10 games at tight end and finished with 37 receptions for 365 yards and a touchdown. After the season, Doyle was named to Phil Steele's National All-Freshman squad.

Doyle started seven games as a sophomore. Although he suffered a season-ending injury, Doyle still caught 20 passes for 224 yards and two touchdowns.

As a junior, Doyle started all 12 games and recorded 52 receptions for 614 yards while also being named second-team All-Sun Belt.

Doyle had his best season as a senior. Doyle started all 13 games and caught 53 passes for 566 yards and five touchdowns. He was named first-team All-Sun Belt and was also a semifinalist for the Mackey Award.

During his time at Western Kentucky, Doyle was a three-time captain.

== Professional career ==
=== Pre-draft ===
Pre-draft measurables
Height	Weight	Arm length	Hand span	Wingspan	40-yard dash
6 ft 5 1/4 in (1.96 m)	254 lb (115 kg)	32 1/8 in (0.82 m)	9 3/8 in (0.24 m)	6 ft 5 3/8 in (1.97 m)	4.90 s
All values from Pro Day

On January 26, 2013, Doyle played in the 2013 Senior Bowl as part of the Oakland Raiders' head coach Dennis Allen's North team that lost 21–16 to Detroit Lions' head coach Jim Schwartz' South team. Doyle did not receive an invitation to participate at the NFL Scouting Combine. On February 21, he held a private pro day and had scouts and team representatives from 20 NFL teams attend. He ran the majority of combine and positional drills, but elected to skip the bench press. Doyle was mentored by former Indianapolis Colts' tight end Ken Dilger in preparation for his pro day. At the conclusion of the pre-draft process, Doyle was projected to be a seventh-round pick or priority undrafted free agent by NFL draft experts and scouts. He was ranked as the 20th best tight end prospect in the draft by DraftScout.com.

=== Tennessee Titans ===
On May 1, 2013, the Tennessee Titans signed Doyle to a three-year, $1.49 million contract as an undrafted free agent after going undrafted in the 2013 NFL draft. Throughout training camp, he competed to be a backup tight end against Taylor Thompson, Brandon Barden, and Martell Webb. On August 31, the Titans waived Doyle as part as their final roster cuts, but planned to re-sign him to their practice squad after clearing waivers.

=== Indianapolis Colts ===
==== 2013 ====
On September 1, 2013, the Indianapolis Colts claimed Doyle off of waivers and added him to their active roster. Head coach Chuck Pagano named Doyle the fourth tight end on the Colts' depth chart to begin the regular season, behind Dwayne Allen, Coby Fleener, and Dominique Jones.

Doyle made his professional regular season debut during the Week 2 24–20 loss to the Miami Dolphins after Dwayne Allen was placed on injured reserve due to a hip injury he sustained in the season-opener. During a Week 7 39–33 victory over the Denver Broncos, Doyle caught his first career reception on a seven-yard pass from quarterback Andrew Luck before being tackled by Danny Trevathan during the third quarter. The following week, Doyle was promoted to being the primary backup on the depth chart behind Coby Fleener and earned his first career start during a 27–24 road victory over the Houston Texans after the Colts released Dominique Jones.

Doyle finished his rookie year with five receptions for 19 yards in 15 games and four starts. The Colts finished the 2013 season atop the AFC South with an 11–5 record. On January 4, 2014, Doyle appeared in his first career playoff game as the Colts narrowly defeated the Kansas City Chiefs by a score of 45–44 during the AFC Wild Card Round. On January 11, 2014, Doyle started in his first career playoff game and had a seven-yard reception during a 43–22 road loss to the New England Patriots in the AFC Divisional Round.

==== 2014 ====
During training camp, Doyle competed for a roster spot as a backup tight end against Weslye Saunders and Erik Swoope. Head coach Chuck Pagano named Doyle the third tight end on the Colts' depth chart to begin the regular season, behind Dwayne Allen and Coby Fleener.

During a Week 2 30–27 loss to the Philadelphia Eagles, Doyle scored his first NFL touchdown on a two-yard touchdown pass by quarterback Andrew Luck in the second quarter, which also marked Luck's 50th career touchdown pass. In the regular-season finale against the Tennessee Titans, Doyle caught a season-high four receptions for 21 yards and a touchdown during the 27–10 road victory.

Doyle finished his second professional season with 18 receptions for 118 yards and two touchdowns in 16 games and one start. Doyle played 399 offensive snaps (34.5%) and was mainly used as a blocker in Pep Hamilton's offense. The Colts finished the 2014 atop the AFC South with an 11–5 record and reached the AFC Championship Game, where they were defeated on the road 45–7 by the Patriots.

==== 2015 ====
Head coach Chuck Pagano named Doyle the third tight end on the depth chart to begin the regular season, behind Dwayne Allen and Coby Fleener.

During Week 3 against the Titans, Doyle recorded a season-high three receptions for 32 yards in the narrow 35–33 victory. During a Week 9 27–24 victory over the Broncos, he had two receptions for 18 yards and a touchdown in the 27–24 victory. He recorded a three-yard touchdown reception that also marked quarterback Andrew Luck's 100th career touchdown pass. On November 23, 2015, the Colts fired offensive coordinator Pep Hamilton and promoted associate head coach Rob Chudzinski to offensive coordinator for the rest of the season.

Doyle finished the 2015 season with 12 receptions for 72 yards and a touchdown in 16 games and two starts.

==== 2016 ====
On March 3, 2016, the Colts extended a qualifying offer to Doyle as a restricted free agent. On April 24, he accepted his one-year, $1.67 million restricted free agent tender after not getting any control offers from any other team. Doyle entered training camp slated as the secondary starting tight end on the depth chart after Coby Fleener departed during free agency. Head coach Chuck Pagano officially named Doyle and Dwayne Allen the starting tight ends to begin the regular season.

Doyle started in the season-opening 39–35 loss to the Detroit Lions and caught three passes for 35 yards and two touchdowns, marking his first multi-touchdown game of his career. During a Week 7 34–26 road victory over the Titans, Doyle had a season-high nine receptions for 78 yards and a touchdown.

Doyle finished the 2016 season with 59 receptions for 584 yards and five touchdowns in 16 games and 14 starts.

==== 2017 ====
Doyle in December 2017

On March 7, 2017, the Colts signed Doyle to a three-year, $18.9 million contract with $7.5 million guaranteed. Doyle entered training camp slated as the No. 1 starting tight end on the depth chart after Dwayne Allen was traded to the New England Patriots. Head coach Chuck Pagano named Doyle the starting tight end to begin the regular season.

During Week 4 against the Seattle Seahawks, Doyle caught five passes for 27 yards before leaving the eventual 46–18 road loss in the third quarter with a concussion. He was inactive for next game against the San Francisco 49ers due to neck soreness. During a narrow Week 8 24–23 road loss to the Cincinnati Bengals, Doyle caught a career-high 12 receptions for 121 yards and a touchdown. On December 31, 2017, the Colts fired head coach Chuck Pagano and his coaching staff after they finished the 2017 season with a 4–12 record.

Doyle finished the 2017 season with a career-high 80 receptions for 690 yards and four touchdowns in 15 games and starts. On January 21, 2018, it was announced that he was selected to play in the 2018 Pro Bowl as a replacement for Patriots tight end Rob Gronkowski, who was set to appear in Super Bowl LII. Doyle became the first Western Kentucky alumni to be selected to the Pro Bowl in school history.

==== 2018 ====
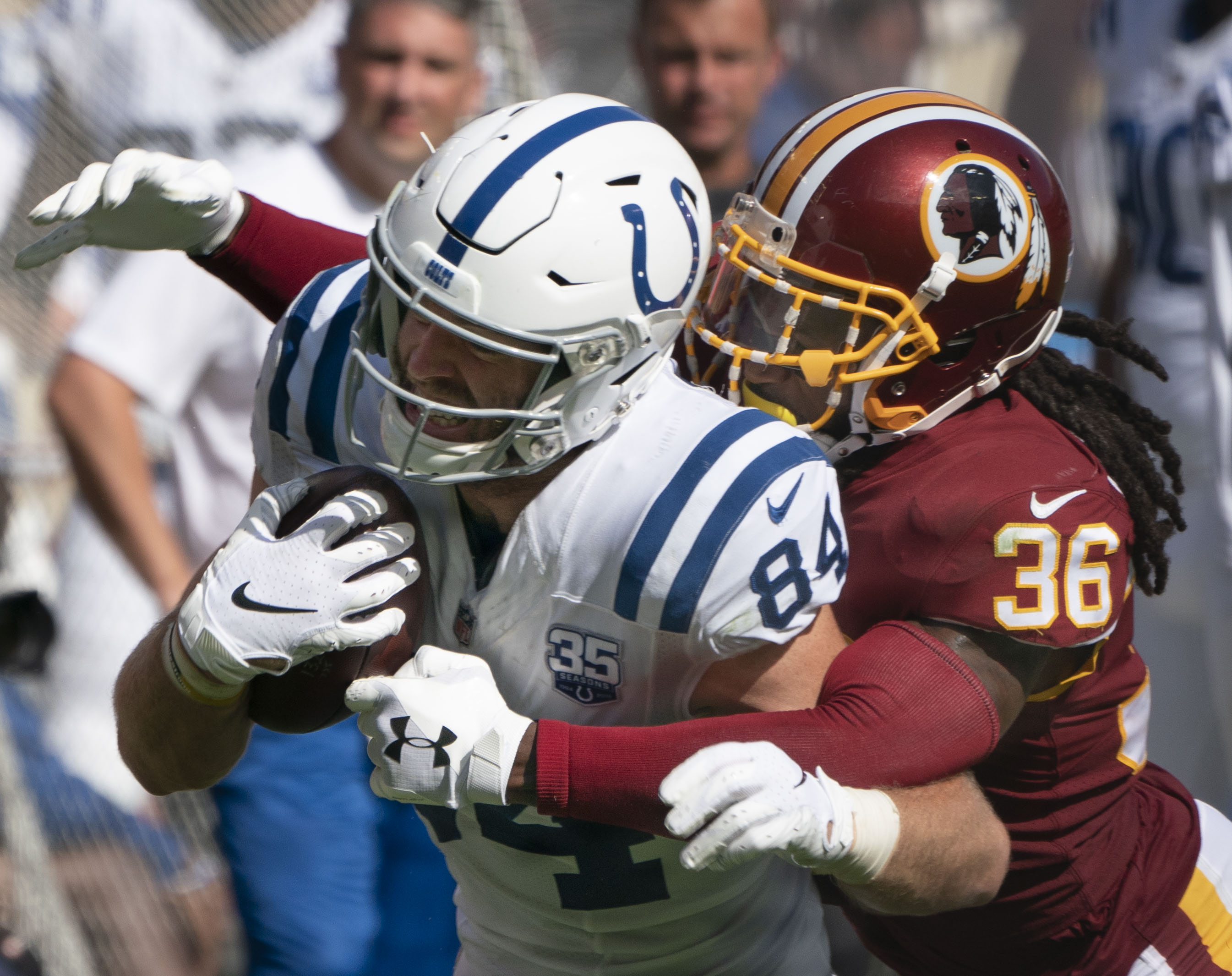
Doyle in 2018

In 2018, Doyle missed five games with a hip injury before being hospitalized following the Week 12 game with a kidney injury. He was placed on injured reserve on November 26, 2018.

Doyle finished the 2018 season with 26 receptions for 245 yards and two touchdowns in six games and starts.

==== 2019 ====
On December 6, 2019, Doyle signed a three-year, $21 million contract extension with the Colts through the 2022 season.

In 2019, Doyle started all 16 games and finished with 43 receptions for 448 yards and four touchdowns. After the season, he was named to the 2020 Pro Bowl as a replacement for Travis Kelce, who was appearing in Super Bowl LIV.

==== 2020 ====
In the 2020 season, Doyle had 23 receptions for 251 yards and three touchdowns in 14 games and 12 starts. During the Wild Card Round against the Buffalo Bills, Doyle had seven receptions for 70 yards and a touchdown to go along with a two-point conversion in the 27–24 road loss.

==== 2021 ====
During Week 5 against the Baltimore Ravens, Doyle drew a personal foul penalty against Tavon Young in the final minute of the game when he pushed Young's head into the ground after a play, then fell when Young pushed him back. This penalty allowed the Colts to turn a 3rd and 18 into an opportunity for a 47-yard field goal to win the game. However, Colts kicker Rodrigo Blankenship would miss the kick and the Colts would go on to lose on the road by a score of 33–27 in overtime.

Doyle finished the 2021 season with 29 receptions for 302 yards and three touchdowns in 17 games and 14 starts.

=== Retirement ===
On March 7, 2022, Doyle announced his retirement from the NFL.

== Career statistics ==
=== NFL ===
==== Regular season ====
Year	Team	Games		Receiving					Fumbles	
Year	Team	GP	GS	Rec	Yds	Avg	Lng	TD	Fum	Lost
2013	IND	15	4	5	19	3.8	8	0	–	–
2014	IND	16	1	18	118	6.6	20	2	–	–
2015	IND	16	2	12	72	6.0	19	1	–	–
2016	IND	16	14	59	584	9.9	24	5	1	1
2017	IND	15	15	80	690	8.6	26	4	2	2
2018	IND	6	6	26	245	9.4	20	2	1	1
2019	IND	16	16	43	448	10.4	23	4	1	0
2020	IND	14	12	23	251	10.9	28	3	1	1
2021	IND	17	14	29	302	10.4	34	3	0	0
Career		131	84	295	2,729	9.3	34	24	6	5

==== Postseason ====
Year	Team	Games		Receiving					Fumbles	
Year	Team	GP	GS	Rec	Yds	Avg	Lng	TD	Fum	Lost
2013	IND	2	1	1	7	7.0	7	0	0	0
2014	IND	2	0	6	23	3.8	8	0	0	0
2018	IND	0	0	Did not play due to injury						
2020	IND	1	1	7	70	10.0	27	1	0	0
Career		5	2	14	100	7.1	27	1	0	0

=== College ===
Season	Team	Conf	Class	Pos	GP	Receiving			
Season	Team	Conf	Class	Pos	GP	Rec	Yds	Avg	TD
2009	Western Kentucky	Sun Belt	FR	TE	10	37	365	9.9	1
2010	Western Kentucky	Sun Belt	SO	TE	7	20	224	11.2	2
2011	Western Kentucky	Sun Belt	JR	TE	12	52	614	11.8	0
2012	Western Kentucky	Sun Belt	SR	TE	13	53	566	10.7	5
Career					42	162	1,769	10.9	8
