= Adam Smith (American football) =

American football player (born 1990)

No. 76
- Position: Offensive guard

Personal information
- Born: April 9, 1990 (age 36); Murfreesboro, Tennessee, U.S.
- Listed height: 6 ft 5 in (1.96 m)
- Listed weight: 325 lb (147 kg)

Career information
- High school: Blackman (Murfreesboro)
- College: Western Kentucky
- NFL draft: 2013: undrafted

Career history
- Tampa Bay Buccaneers (2013)*; Philadelphia Soul (2014–2017)
- * Offseason or practice squad member only

Awards and highlights
- ArenaBowl champion (2016); 2× First-team All-Arena (2015, 2016); First-team All-Sun Belt (2012); Second-team All-Sun Belt (2011)

Career AFL statistics
- Receptions: 31
- Receiving yards: 231
- Receiving TDs: 15
- Tackles: 5.5
- Stats at ArenaFan.com

Adam Smith (born April 9, 1990) is an American former professional football offensive guard who played four seasons with the Philadelphia Soul of the Arena Football League (AFL). He played college football at Western Kentucky.

== College career ==
Adam Smith played college football at Western Kentucky. He was in for 764 plays in 2012 at Western Kentucky. He accumulated 55 knock down blocks and 41 pancake blocks.

== Professional career ==
On April 29, 2013, Smith was signed as an undrafted free agent by the Tampa Bay Buccaneers. On August 27, 2013, he was waived by the Buccaneers.

On December 11, 2015, Smith was assigned to the Philadelphia Soul for the 2016 season. On April 19, 2017, Smith was assigned to the Soul.
