= Caylin Hauptmann =

American football player (born 1991)

No. 61, 68, 74
- Position: Offensive Guard

Personal information
- Born: July 10, 1991 (age 35); Los Angeles, California
- Listed height: 6 ft 3 in (1.91 m)
- Listed weight: 300 lb (136 kg)

Career information
- High school: Beverly Hills (CA)
- College: Florida International
- NFL draft: 2013: undrafted

Career history
- Cleveland Browns (2013)*; Seattle Seahawks (2013); Cleveland Browns (2014)*; New England Patriots (2014–2015)*; Tampa Bay Buccaneers (2016)*
- * Offseason or practice squad member only

Awards and highlights
- 2× Super Bowl champion (XLVIII, XLIX); 2× Second-team All-Sun Belt (2011, 2012)
- Stats at Pro Football Reference

Caylin Hauptmann (born July 10, 1991) is an American former professional football offensive lineman. He signed with the Cleveland Browns as an undrafted free agent in 2013. He was signed to the Seattle Seahawks in September 2013.

== Early life ==
Hauptmann was born in Los Angeles, California. He attended Beverly Hills High School in Beverly Hills and played high school football. He played center and tackle. He was also on the Beverly Hills Track and Field team as a member on the shot put team. Hauptmann broke a 30-year record on shot put (60–10.5) at Beverly Hills.

== College career ==
Immediately following high school graduation, Hauptmann accepted a scholarship offer to College of the Canyons, where he played left guard on the offensive line. After one season he transferred to Florida International University (FIU), where he became an immediate starter on the offensive line. He started every game during the 2012 football season, and finished his college career starting every game for a total of 37 games (over three seasons). Caylin Hauptmann helped pave the way for the FIU offense to have four 100-yard rushers, three 300-yard passing efforts and six 100-yard receivers in a season where the primary running back, and quarterback were out for multiple games with injury. He served as captain of the FIU offensive line (2011). Phil Steele named him to his postseason all-conference team after both his sophomore and junior seasons, while making his debut on the official All-Sun Belt team, as a second-team pick in 2011. Hauptmann was nominated in 2012 to the list of nominees for the Outland Award, the highest award for U.S. college offensive lineman. He was also a major contributor on offense to the FIU team that won the 2010 Little Caesar's Pizza Bowl.

== Professional career ==
Hauptmann was signed as an undrafted free agent with the Cleveland Browns on April 27, 2013. After 2013 pre-season, he was signed to the roster of the Browns, then waived, then signed to the team's practice squad.

On September 23, 2013, Hauptmann was signed off the Browns' practice squad by the Seattle Seahawks. Hauptmann won Super Bowl XLVIII with the Seahawks after they defeated the Denver Broncos by a score of 43–8.

Hauptmann was claimed off waivers by the Browns on August 31, 2014. He was waived following a failed physical on September 2, 2014. Hauptmann would later be added to the practice squad for the 2014 NFL season.

In 2014, Hauptmann signed with the New England Patriots. Hauptmann won his second straight Super Bowl when the Patriots defeated his old team Seattle Seahawks 28–24 in Super Bowl XLIX.

On August 2, 2016, Hauptmann signed with the Tampa Bay Buccaneers. On August 6, 2016, Hauptmann was waived by the team.
