= Christopher Martin (trumpeter) =

American trumpeter

- Origin: Marietta, Georgia, United States
- Genre: Classical
- Occupation: Trumpeter

Christopher Martin is an American trumpet player who was named the principal trumpet of the New York Philharmonic in May 2016 and began his tenure there in September 2016. He has also served as principal trumpet of the Chicago Symphony Orchestra (2005–2017) and the Atlanta Symphony Orchestra (2000–2005), Martin was a New World Symphony Fellow, although briefly, in the fall of 1997. He attended NRO (national repertory orchestra)in 1997 with Billy Hunter Jr. and Kevin Finamore. Then as associate principal of the Philadelphia Orchestra (1997–2000). He has also performed with High Bridge Brass, an American conical brass quintet, since its founding in June 2018. During his time in Chicago, Martin gave the world premieres of several trumpet concerti, notably Christopher Rouse's Heimdall's Trumpet in 2012. Christopher Martin plays on a YTR-9445CHSIII C Trumpet, YTR-9335CHSIII Bb trumpet, a Large Bore Bach 25 Bb trumpet, a Schilke P5-4, Bach Cornet, Yamaha Cornet. . He plays on Parke Mouthpieces, specifically 640(1.5c)-285(5B cup) and the 640-280(C cup) for high stuff & pops, and seen occasionally using a GR mouthpiece for high excerpts like Bartok Concerto for orchestra. For piccolo he uses a Bach 17E.

== Biography ==
Martin is a native of Marietta, GA. His father, Freddy, is a band director in Atlanta's Westminster Schools, and his mother, Lynda, sings in the Atlanta Symphony Orchestra Chorus. Growing up in a musical family, Martin often attended his father's drum corps rehearsals and was inspired from an early age to play a brass instrument. While attending Sprayberry High School in Marietta, GA, Martin began trumpet lessons with Larry Black of the Atlanta Symphony Orchestra.

After high school, Martin attended the Eastman School of Music, where he studied with Barbara Butler and Charles Geyer. He was a member of the Spirit of Atlanta Drum and Bugle Corps in 1993. After his time at Eastman, Martin won a fellowship playing in the New World Symphony in 1997. His stint in NWS was brief, however, because he soon won the associate principal trumpet position with the Philadelphia Orchestra, where he played three complete seasons (1998–2000). From there, he won the principal trumpet position with his hometown orchestra, the Atlanta Symphony Orchestra, where he played until 2005.

== Chicago Symphony Orchestra ==
From the ASO, Martin won the coveted principal trumpet position with the Chicago Symphony Orchestra in 2005, succeeding the legendary Adolph "Bud" Herseth. During Martin's time in Chicago, he established himself as one of the premier trumpeters in the world, both in the orchestra and as a soloist. He was featured with a major trumpet solo in John Williams’s score to Steven Spielberg’s Lincoln (2012), recorded by the Chicago Symphony Orchestra. This trumpet solo was written by Williams for Martin himself - and was famously performed at the Capitol Fourth Concert in 2013 with the National Symphony Orchestra, under the baton of John Williams. He was also featured on the National Brass Ensemble's Gabrieli album and CSO Resound label recordings, including the 2011 release of CSO Brass Live.

Highlights of Martin's solo appearances with the CSO include the 2012 World Premiere of Christopher Rouse’s concerto Heimdall’s Trumpet; Panufnik’s Concerto in modo antico, with Riccardo Muti; a 2011 program of 20th-century French concertos by André Jolivet and Henri Tomasi; and more than a dozen performances of J.S. Bach’s Brandenburg Concerto No. 2.

In 2016, Martin won the audition to play principal trumpet with the New York Philharmonic. In the fall of 2016, Martin played both in the Chicago Symphony Orchestra and the New York Philharmonic, flying back and forth from Chicago and New York. After playing with the CSO on their January 2017 European tour, he resigned from the Chicago Symphony to accept the full-time position of principal trumpet with the New York Philharmonic.

== New York Philharmonic ==
Martin joined the New York Philharmonic as principal trumpet in September 2016, succeeding the storied Philip Smith, who retired in 2014 after 36 years in that position. Martin made his New York Philharmonic solo debut in October 2016, performing Ligeti's The Mysteries of the Macabre, led by then music director Alan Gilbert. Since his New York Philharmonic debut, he has performed many high-octane concerts, including Mahler's Fifth Symphony livestreamed internationally under the baton of then music director-designate Jaap Van Zweden.

== As a teacher ==
Martin is also an active teacher, having served as an adjunct professor of trumpet at Temple University and Northwestern University, and as a coach for the Chicago Civic Orchestra. He co-founded the National Brass Symposium in 2010 with his brother Michael Martin (trumpeter with the Boston Symphony Orchestra). In 2018, he joined the faculty at the Juilliard School.

Martin lives with his wife Margaret, an organist and pianist with whom he occasionally gives recitals, and his daughter Claire. He is a runner, and has completed numerous marathons.
