= Brynden Trawick =

American football player (born 1989)

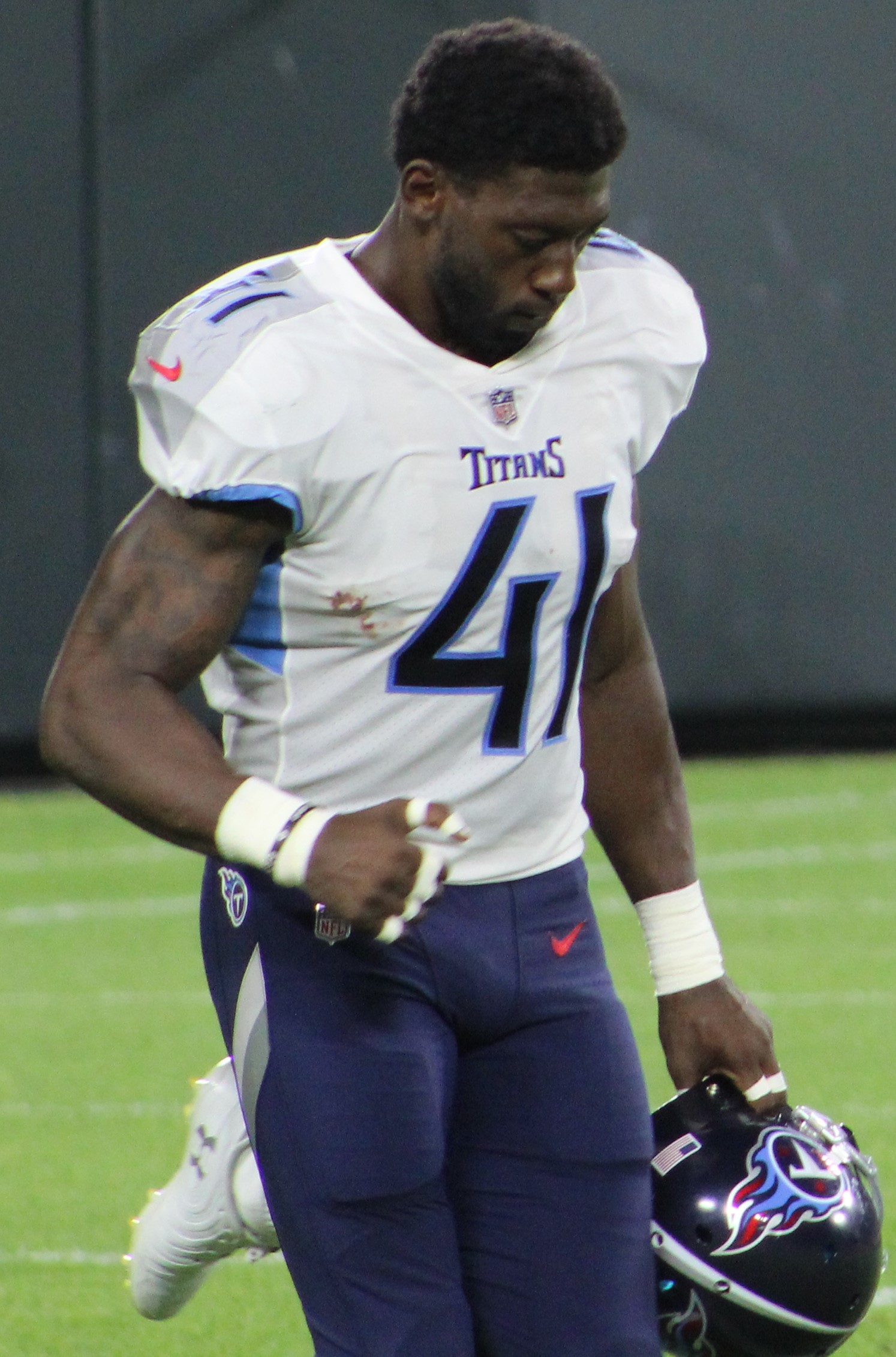
- Trawick with the Tennessee Titans in 2018

No. 28, 41, 31
- Position: Safety

Personal information
- Born: October 23, 1989 (age 37); Marietta, Georgia, U.S.
- Listed height: 6 ft 2 in (1.88 m)
- Listed weight: 225 lb (102 kg)

Career information
- High school: Sprayberry (Marietta, Georgia)
- College: Troy
- NFL draft: 2013: undrafted

Career history
- Baltimore Ravens (2013–2015); Oakland Raiders (2016); Tennessee Titans (2017–2018); Baltimore Ravens (2019)

Awards and highlights
- Pro Bowl (2017); First-team All-Sun Belt (2012); Second-team All-Sun Belt (2011)

Career NFL statistics
- Total tackles: 80
- Pass deflections: 2
- Interceptions: 1
- Stats at Pro Football Reference

Brynden George Trawick (born October 23, 1989) is an American former professional football player who was a safety in the National Football League (NFL). He played college football for the Troy Trojans.

== Early life ==
Trawick was born on October 23, 1989, in Marietta, Georgia. He attended Sprayberry High School in Marietta and was a three-year starter and two-time All-League and All-County selection. As a senior in 2007, recorded 69 tackles, an interception, two fumble recoveries and two blocked extra points. He totaled more than 600 all-purpose yards and four touchdowns, caught 15 passes for 195 yards, and rushed 17 times for 156 yards during his final high school season.

== College career ==
After originally committing to play at Michigan State, Trawick saw limited playing time in his first two years with the Spartans. He redshirted in 2008 and recorded just two tackles in 2009.

He then transferred to Northeast Mississippi Community College in December 2009 after he was suspended from Michigan State for being present at a residence hall during an incident in which several of his teammates were charged with assault.

“My heart just wasn’t in it,” Trawick said of his time as a Spartan. “I got focused on what wasn’t important, and I needed to switch it up and get refocused again.”

While at Troy, Trawick had 206 tackles, one sack, three interceptions, nine pass deflections, and one forced fumble.

== Professional career ==
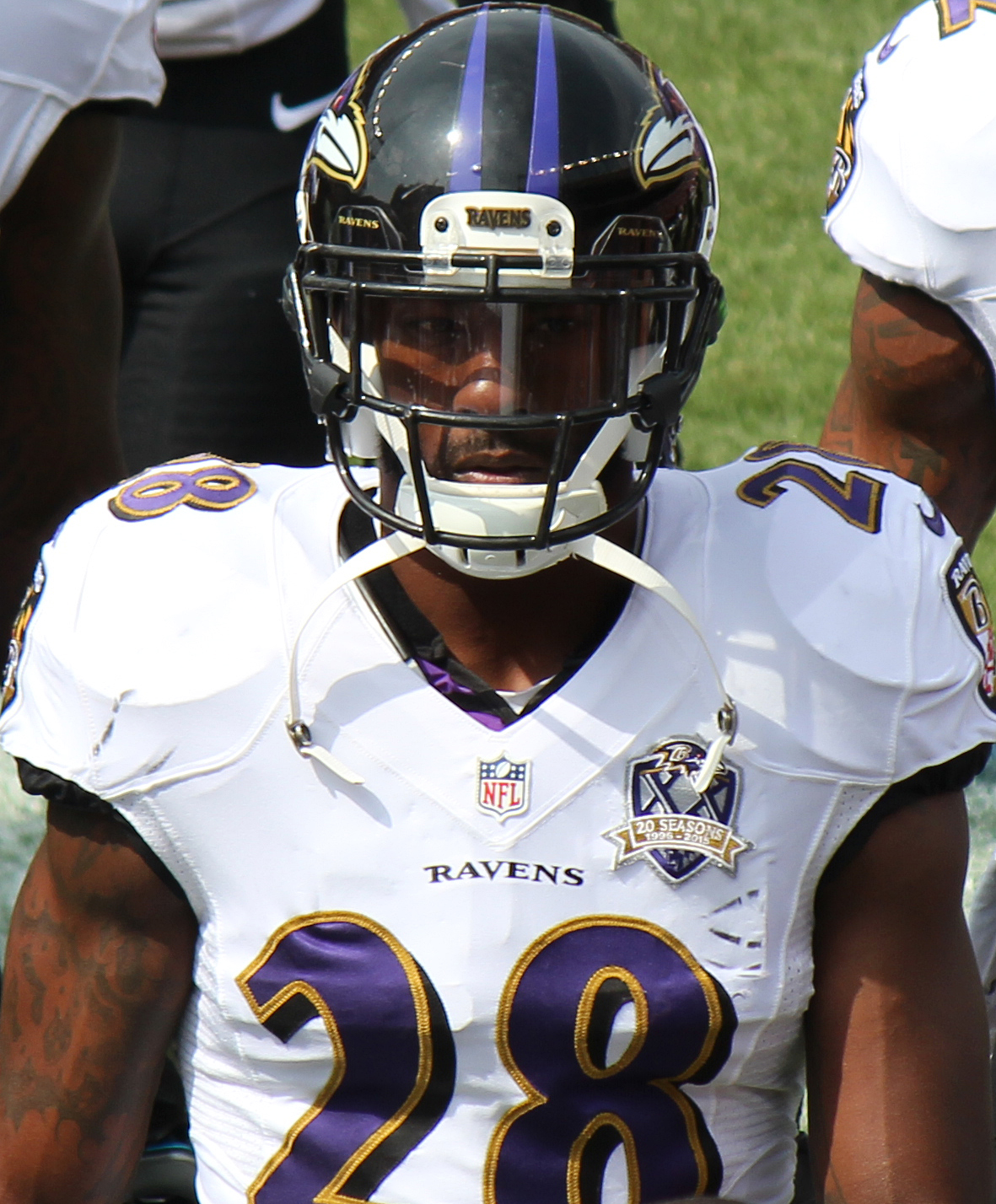
Trawick with the Ravens in 2015

=== Baltimore Ravens ===
On April 27, 2013, Trawick signed with the Baltimore Ravens as an undrafted free agent. On September 5, during the season-opener against the Denver Broncos, Trawick accidentally injured teammate Jacoby Jones when they collided on a punt Jones was attempting to catch. The collision resulted in a right knee sprain for Jones, who did not return to the game.

=== Oakland Raiders ===
Trawick signed with the Oakland Raiders on March 16, 2016. He led the Raiders with a career-best 14 special teams tackles.

=== Tennessee Titans ===
On March 10, 2017, Trawick signed a two-year, $4.75 million contract with the Tennessee Titans. On January 21, 2018, Trawick was named to his first Pro Bowl as a special teamer after posting a team-best and career-high 17 special teams tackles. In the 2018 season, he made eight combined tackles.

=== Baltimore Ravens (second stint) ===
On August 1, 2019, Trawick signed with the Baltimore Ravens. He was placed on injured reserve on October 3, with an elbow injury. Trawick was designated for return from injured reserve on November 14, and began practicing with the team again. On December 3, Trawick was activated from injured reserve.

== Personal life ==
Trawick’s father, George, was the head basketball coach at DeVry University in the early 1990s. He coached in the highest-scoring men’s basketball game in NCAA history, regardless of division classification. On January 12, 1992, Troy State University defeated DeVry 258–141 in a game that is considered to have established several unbreakable records.
