= Leonardo Bates =

American football player (born 1989)

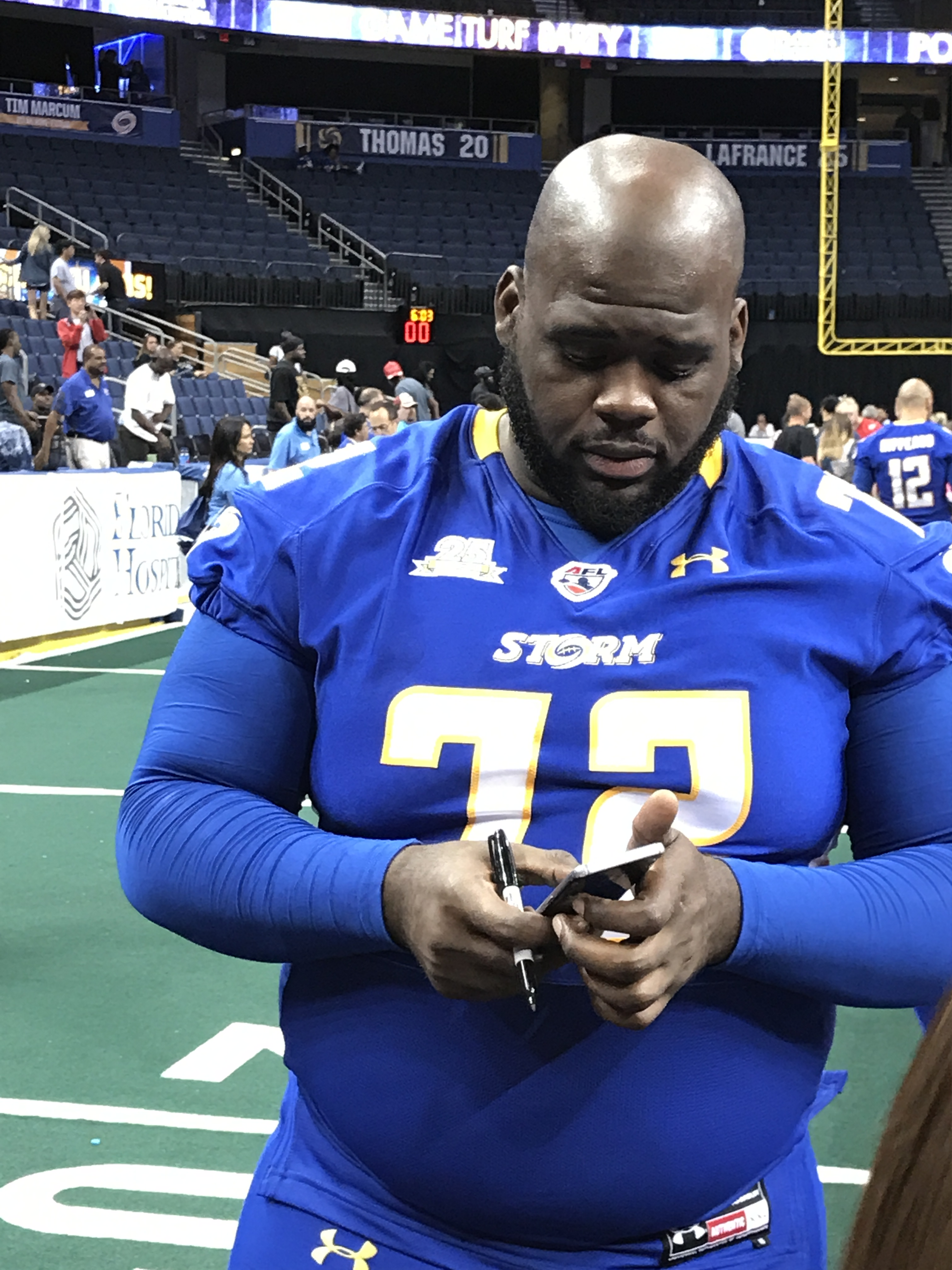
- Bates with the Tampa Bay Storm in 2017

No. 64, 72, 69
- Position: Offensive lineman

Personal information
- Born: November 28, 1989 (age 36); New Orleans, Louisiana, U.S.
- Listed height: 6 ft 5 in (1.96 m)
- Listed weight: 310 lb (141 kg)

Career information
- High school: Marrero (LA) L.W. Higgins
- College: Louisiana–Lafayette
- NFL draft: 2013: undrafted

Career history
- Calgary Stampeders (2013)*; New Orleans VooDoo (2014–2015); Portland Steel (2016); Tampa Bay Storm (2017); Atlantic City Blackjacks (2019)
- * Offseason or practice squad member only

Awards and highlights
- 2× Second-team All-Sun Belt (2011, 2012)

Career AFL statistics
- Receptions: 5
- Receiving yards: 45
- Receiving touchdowns: 2
- Tackles: 1.5
- Stats at ArenaFan.com

Leonardo Bates (born November 28, 1989) is an American former professional football offensive lineman who played in the Arena Football League (AFL) for the New Orleans VooDoo, Portland Steel, Tampa Bay Storm, and Atlantic City Blackjacks. He played college football at University of Louisiana at Lafayette and attended L.W. Higgins High School in Marrero, Louisiana.

== College career ==
Bates played for the Louisiana–Lafayette Ragin' Cajuns from 2008 to 2012. He was the team's starter his final two and a half years and helped the Ragin' Cajuns to 27 wins. He played in 45 games during his career including 7 starts at guard and 27 at tackle. Bates was a two-time All–Sun Belt Conference performer for the Ragin' Cajuns. While at Louisiana–Lafayette, Bates was a General Studies major. He earned a bachelor's degree in Applied Science.

== Professional career ==
Pre-draft measurables
Height	Weight	40-yard dash	10-yard split	20-yard split	20-yard shuttle	Three-cone drill	Vertical jump	Broad jump	Bench press
6 ft 4 in (1.93 m)	302 lb (137 kg)	5.77 s	2.03 s	3.09 s	5.25 s	8.21 s	22.5 in (0.57 m)	7 ft 7 in (2.31 m)	18 reps
All values from Louisiana–Lafayette Pro Day

=== Calgary Stampeders ===
After going undrafted in the 2013 NFL draft, Bates signed with the Calgary Stampeders of the Canadian Football League in late May 2013. On June 17, 2013, it was reported that he had been released.

=== New Orleans VooDoo ===
Bates was assigned to the New Orleans VooDoo on January 22, 2014. Bates appeared in 12 games for the VooDoo as a rookie. On September 24, 2014, Bates' rookie option was picked up by the VooDoo. Bates started 12 games for the VooDoo in 2015.

=== Portland Steel ===
On February 5, 2016, Bates was assigned to Portland Thunder. Bates missed a few July games on injured reserve. On August 4, 2016, Bates was placed on inactive reserve, where he would finish the season.

=== Tampa Bay Storm ===
Bates was assigned to the Tampa Bay Storm on April 6, 2017. The Storm folded in December 2017.

=== Atlantic City Blackjacks ===
On April 16, 2019, Bates was assigned to the Atlantic City Blackjacks.

== Personal life ==
Bates was born in a family of four children to a father named Ernestine. Bate's siblings include one sister named Maria and two brothers named Steafan Horne and Jwann. Since 2020, Bates has worked as a high school biology teacher at Collegiate Academies in his hometown of New Orleans.
