= 2016 Georgia Southern Eagles football team =

American college football season

2016 Georgia Southern Eagles football
- Conference: Sun Belt Conference
- Record: 5–7 (4–4 Sun Belt)
- Head coach: Tyson Summers (1st season)
- Co-offensive coordinators: Rance Gillespie (1st season); David Dean (1st season)
- Offensive scheme: Spread option
- Defensive coordinator: Lorenzo Costantini (1st season)
- Base defense: 4–3
- Home stadium: Paulson Stadium

2016 Sun Belt Conference football standings
	Conf.			Overall
Team	W		L	W		L
Appalachian State +	7	–	1	10	–	3
Arkansas State +	7	–	1	8	–	5
Troy	6	–	2	10	–	3
Idaho	6	–	2	9	–	4
Louisiana–Lafayette	5	–	3	6	–	7
Georgia Southern	4	–	4	5	–	7
Louisiana–Monroe	3	–	5	4	–	8
South Alabama	2	–	6	6	–	7
Georgia State	2	–	6	3	–	9
New Mexico State	2	–	6	3	–	9
Texas State	0	–	8	2	–	10
+ – Conference co-champions

The 2016 Georgia Southern Eagles football team represented Georgia Southern University in the 2016 NCAA Division I FBS football season. The Eagles played their home games at Paulson Stadium in Statesboro, Georgia, and competed in the Sun Belt Conference. They were led by first-year head coach Tyson Summers. They finished the season 5–7, 4–4 in Sun Belt play to finish in sixth place.

== Schedule ==
Georgia Southern announced its 2016 football schedule on March 3, 2016. The 2016 schedule consists of 5 home and 7 away games in the regular season. The Eagles will host Sun Belt foes Appalachian State, Louisiana–Lafayette, Louisiana–Monroe, and Troy, and will travel to Arkansas State, Georgia State, New Mexico State, and South Alabama. Georgia Southern will skip out on two Sun Belt teams this season, Idaho and Texas State.

The team will play four non–conference games, one home game against Savannah State from the Mid-Eastern Athletic Conference (MEAC), and will travel to three road games against Georgia Tech from Atlantic Coast Conference (ACC), Ole Miss from the Southeastern Conference (SEC) and Western Michigan from the Mid-American Conference (MAC).

Date	Time	Opponent	Site	TV	Result	Attendance
September 3	6:00 pm	Savannah State*	Paulson Stadium; Statesboro, GA	ESPN3	W 54–0	21,250
September 10	7:00 pm	at South Alabama	Ladd–Peebles Stadium; Mobile, AL	ASN	W 24–9	17,691
September 17	6:00 pm	Louisiana–Monroe	Paulson Stadium; Statesboro, GA	ESPN3	W 23–21	25,735
September 24	7:00 pm	at Western Michigan*	Waldo Stadium; Kalamazoo, MI	ESPN3	L 31–49	17,209
October 5	8:00 pm	at Arkansas State	Centennial Bank Stadium; Jonesboro, AR	ESPN2	L 26–27	19,381
October 15	12:30 pm	at Georgia Tech*	Bobby Dodd Stadium; Atlanta, GA	ACCRSN	L 24–35	47,609
October 22	8:00 pm	at New Mexico State	Aggie Memorial Stadium; Las Cruces, NM	FSAZ/FSSW	W 22–19	10,085
October 27	7:30 pm	Appalachian State	Paulson Stadium; Statesboro, GA (rivalry)	ESPNU	L 10–34	23,474
November 5	12:00 pm	at Ole Miss*	Vaught–Hemingway Stadium; Oxford, MS	ESPNU	L 27–37	60,263
November 10	7:30 pm	Louisiana–Lafayette^{†}	Paulson Stadium; Statesboro, GA	ESPNU	L 26–33	16,786
November 19	2:00 pm	at Georgia State	Georgia Dome; Atlanta, GA	ESPN3	L 24–30	23,513
December 3	12:00 pm	Troy	Paulson Stadium; Statesboro, GA	ESPN2	W 28–24	16,850
*Non-conference game; ^{†}Homecoming; All times are in Eastern time

== Game summaries ==
=== Savannah State ===
Week One: Savannah State Tigers at Georgia Southern Eagles – Game summary

Quarter	1	2	3	4	Total
Tigers	0	0	0	0	0
Eagles	21	7	19	7	54

at Paulson Stadium, Statesboro, GA

- Date: September 3
- Game time: 6:00 p.m. EDT
- Game weather: 82°F • NE 3 • Partly cloudy
- Game attendance: 21,250
- Referee: Kevin Stine
- TV: ESPN3
- Georgia Southern vs Savannah State

Game information

First quarter

- 8:33 GS – Favian Upshaw 2 yard run (Tyler Bass kick), Eagles 7–0. Drive: 10 plays, 56 yards, TOP 5:09
- 7:15 GS – Favian Upshaw 33 yard run (Tyler Bass kick), Eagles 14–0. Drive: 2 plays, 23 yards, TOP 0:40
- 1:21 GS – Wesley Fields 1 yard run (Tyler Bass kick), Eagles 21–0. Drive: 9 plays, 82 yards, TOP 3:30

Second quarter

- 0:30 GS – Matt Breida 12 yard pass from Favian Upshaw (Tyler Bass kick), Eagles 28–0. Drive: 10 plays, 61 yards, TOP 4:11

Third quarter

- 12:17 GS – Kevin Ellison 11 yard run (Tyler Bass kick failed), Eagles 34–0. Drive: 6 plays, 70 yards, TOP 2:37
- 5:47 GS – Wesley Fields 30 yard pass from Favian Upshaw (two-point run conv. failed), Eagles 40–0. Drive: 9 plays, 92 yards, TOP 3:52
- 5:20 GS – Matt Breida 26 yard run (Tyler Bass kick), Eagles 47–0. Drive: 1 play, 26 yards, TOP 0:10

Fourth quarter

- 6:18 GS – Troy Stewart 7 yard run (Tyler Bass kick), Eagles 54–0. Drive: 7 plays, 82 yards, TOP 3:19

Leading Passers

- SSU – Blake Dever, 5–9, 50 yards
- GS – Fabian Upshaw, 7–10, 115 yards, 2 touchdowns, 1 interception

Leading Rushers

- SSU – TJ Bell, 5 carries, 21 yards
- GS – Demarcus Godfrey, 14 carries, 124 yards

Leading Receivers

- SSU – Steven Hagan, 3 receptions, 42 yards
- GS – Montay Crockett, 3 receptions, 73 yards

Leading Tacklers

- SSU – Mulik Simmons, 15 tackles
- GS – Ironhead Gallon, 6 tackles

=== @ South Alabama ===
Week Two: Georgia Southern Eagles at South Alabama Jaguars – Game summary

Quarter	1	2	3	4	Total
Eagles	10	0	7	7	24
Jaguars	3	3	0	3	9

at Ladd–Peebles Stadium, Mobile, AL

- Date: September 10
- Game time: 7:00 p.m. EDT
- Game weather: 84°F • S 6 • Partly cloudy
- Game attendance: 17,691
- Referee: Jason McArthur
- TV: ASN
- Georgia Southern vs South Alabama

Game information

First quarter

- 11:37 USA – Gavin Patterson 40 yard field goal, Jaguars 3–0. Drive: 8 plays, 52 yards, TOP 3:23
- 5:30 GS – Younghoe Koo 28 yard field goal, Tied 3–3. Drive: 11 plays, 51 yards, TOP 6:07
- 1:22 GS – LA Ramsby 1 yard run (Younghoe Koo kick), Eagles 10–3. Drive: 8 plays, 48 yards, TOP 3:43

Second quarter

- 1:11 USA – Gavin Patterson 23 yard field goal, Eagles 10–6. Drive: 15 plays, 60 yards, TOP 6:41

Third quarter

- 11:10 GS – Wesley Fields 5 yard run (Younghoe Koo kick), Eagles 17–6. Drive: 9 plays, 73 yards, TOP 3:50

Fourth quarter

- 14:11 GS – Kevin Ellison 27 yard run (Younghoe Koo kick), Eagles 24–6. Drive: 8 plays, 66 yards, TOP 4:07
- 7:54 USA – Gavin Patterson 32 yard field goal, Eagles 24–9. Drive: 7 plays, 47 yards, TOP 2:06

Leading Passers

- GS – Favian Upshaw, 6–9, 127 yards
- USA – Dallas Davis, 21–42, 279 yards, 1 interception

Leading Rushers

- GS – Favian Upshaw, 18 carries, 108 yards
- USA – Xavier Johnson, 7 carries, 21 yards

Leading Receivers

- GS – BJ Johnson III, 3 receptions, 63 yards
- USA – Kevin Kutchera, 3 receptions, 69 yards

Leading Tacklers

- GS – Ukeme Eligwe, 7 tackles
- USA – Roman Buchanan, 13 tackles

=== Louisiana–Monroe ===
Week Three: Louisiana–Monroe Warhawks at Georgia Southern Eagles – Game summary

Quarter	1	2	3	4	Total
Warhawks	14	0	0	7	21
Eagles	7	3	6	7	23

at Paulson Stadium, Statesboro, GA

- Date: September 17
- Game time: 6:00 p.m. EDT
- Game weather: 88°F • E 7 • Partly cloudy
- Game attendance: 25,735
- Referee: Jason Autrey
- TV: ESPN3
- Georgia Southern vs Louisiana–Monroe

Game information

First quarter

- 10:26 ULM – Xavier Brown 32 yard pass from Garrett Smith (Craig Ford kick), Warhawks 7–0. Drive: 3 plays, 51 yards, TOP 0:37
- 2:39 ULM – Garrett Smith 7 yard run (Craig Ford kick), Warhawks 14–0. Drive: 3 plays, 72 yards, TOP 1:03
- 0:07 GS – Kevin Ellison 6 yard run (Younghoe Koo kick), Warhawks 14–7. Drive: 9 plays, 74 yards, TOP 2:24

Second quarter

- 3:58 GS – Younghoe Koo 32 yard field goal, Warhawks 14–10. Drive: 14 plays, 75 yards, TOP 3:44

Third quarter

- 10:22 GS – Younghoe Koo 37 yard field goal, Warhawks 14–13. Drive: 13 plays, 49 yards, TOP 4:33
- 7:32 GS – Younghoe Koo 43 yard field goal, Eagles 16–14. Drive: 5 plays, 13 yards, TOP 1:58

Fourth quarter

- 12:51 GS – Wesley Fields 2 yard run (Younghoe Koo kick), Eagles 23–14. Drive: 8 plays, 48 yards, TOP 3:31
- 10:21 ULM – Marcus Green 10 yard pass from Garrett Smith (Craig Ford kick), Eagles 23–21. Drive: 6 plays, 75 yards, TOP 2:39

Leading Passers

- ULM – Garrett Smith, 17–33, 283 yards, 2 touchdowns, 1 interception
- GS – Favian Upshaw, 4–14, 64 yards

Leading Rushers

- ULM – Garrett Smith, 14 carries, 22 yards, 1 touchdown
- GS – LA Ramsby, 14 carries, 86 yards

Leading Receivers

- ULM – Marcus Green, 2 receptions, 75 yards, 1 touchdown
- GS – BJ Johnson III, 4 receptions, 59 yards

Leading Tacklers

- ULM – David Griffith, 11 tackles
- GS – Ironhead Gallon, 10 tackles

=== @ Western Michigan ===
Week Four: Georgia Southern Eagles at Western Michigan Broncos – Game summary

Quarter	1	2	3	4	Total
Eagles	7	10	7	7	31
Broncos	7	28	7	7	49

at Waldo Stadium, Kalamazoo, MI

- Date: September 24
- Game time: 7:00 p.m. EDT
- Game weather: 70°F
- Game attendance: 17,208
- Referee: Greg Blum
- TV: ESPN3
- Georgia Southern vs Western Michigan

Game information

First quarter

- 7:36 WMU – Jamauri Bogan 4 yard run (Butch Hampton kick), Broncos 7–0. Drive: 10 plays, 56 yards, TOP 3:57
- 4:02 GS – Wesley Fields 44 yard pass from Favian Upshaw (Younghoe Koo kick), Tied 7–7. Drive: 7 plays, 73 yards, TOP 3:34

Second quarter

- 14:52 WMU – Michael Henry 37 yard pass from Zach Terrell (Butch Hampton kick), Broncos 14–7. Drive: 7 plays, 75 yards, TOP 4:10
- 10:27 GS – Younghoe Koo 34 yard field goal, Broncos 14–10. Drive: 9 plays, 40 yards, TOP 4:25
- 10:14 WMU – Darius Phillips 100 yard kickoff return (Butch Hampton kick), Broncos 21–10. Drive: 0 plays, 0 yards, TOP 0:00
- 7:52 WMU – Carrington Thompson 8 yard pass from Zach Terrell (Butch Hampton kick), Broncos 28–10. Drive: 5 plays, 20 yards, TOP 1:35
- 3:11 GS – Myles Campbell 33 yard pass from Favian Upshaw (Younghoe Koo kick), Broncos 28–17. Drive: 9 plays, 83 yards, TOP 4:41
- 1:35 WMU – Corey Davis 35 yard pass from Zach Terrell (Butch Hampton kick), Broncos 35–17. Drive: 6 plays, 83 yards, TOP 1:36

Third quarter

- 12:18 WMU – Darius Phillips 70 yard interception return (Butch Hampton kick), Broncos 42–17. Drive: 5 plays, 18 yards, TOP 2:42
- 2:07 GS – Montay Crockett 44 yard pass from Kevin Ellison (Younghoe Koo kick), Broncos 42–24. Drive: 9 plays, 80 yards, TOP 4:11

Fourth quarter

- 9:56 GS – LA Ramsby 13 yard run (Younghoe Koo Kick), Broncos 42–31. Drive: 14 plays, 70 yards, TOP 5:19
- 2:11 WMU – Michael Henry 7 yard pass from Zach Terrell (Butch Hampton kick), Broncos 49–31. Drive: 15 plays, 87 yards, TOP 7:45

Leading Passers

- GS – Favian Upshaw, 4–6, 103 yards, 2 touchdowns, 1 interception
- WMU – Zach Terrel, 18–27, 270 yards, 4 touchdowns

Leading Rushers

- GS – Kevin Ellison, 13 carries, 46 yards
- WMU – Jamauri Bogan, 26 carries, 104 yards, 1 touchdown

Leading Receivers

- GS – Montay Crockett, 2 receptions, 53 yards, 1 touchdown
- WMU – Michael Henry, 8 receptions, 125 yards, 2 touchdowns

Leading Tacklers

- GS – Ironhead Gallon, 13 tackles
- WMU – Robert Spillane, 11 tackles

=== @ Arkansas State ===
Week Six: Georgia Southern Eagles at Arkansas State Red Wolves – Game summary

Quarter	1	2	3	4	Total
Eagles	7	6	10	3	26
Red Wolves	0	10	7	10	27

at Centennial Bank Stadium, Jonesboro, AR

- Date: October 5
- Game time: 8:00 p.m. EDT
- Game weather: 84°F • ESE 3.6 • Mostly clear
- Game attendance: 19,381
- Referee: Kevin Stine
- TV: ESPN2
- Georgia Southern vs Arkansas State

Game information

First quarter

- 5:17 GS – LA Ramsby 61 yard run (Younghoe Koo kick), Eagles 7–0. Drive: 1 play, 61 yards, TOP 0:09

Second quarter

- 14:56 ASU – JD Houston 19 yard field goal, Eagles 7–3. Drive: 6 plays, 46 yards, TOP 2:02
- 9:35 GS – Younghoe Koo 32 yard field goal, Eagles 10–3. Drive: 10 plays, 61 yards, TOP 5:21
- 3:29 ASU – Justin McInnis 6 yard pass from Justice Hansen (JD Houston kick), Tied 10–10. Drive: 14 plays, 97 yards, TOP 6:06
- 1:24 GS – Younghoe Koo 53 yard field goal, Eagles 13–10. Drive: 8 plays, 40 yards, TOP 2:05

Third quarter

- 5:56 GS – Younghoe Koo 24 yard field goal, Eagles 16–10. Drive: 18 plays, 73 yards, TOP 9:04
- 2:26 GS – Myles Campbell 63 yard pass from Kevin Ellison (Younghoe Koo kick), Eagles 23–10. Drive: 3 plays, 85 yards, TOP 1:12
- 1:46 ASU – Warren Wand 55 yard run (JD Houston kick), Eagles 23–17. Drive: 3 plays, 75 yards, TOP 0:40

Fourth quarter

- 11:53 GS – Younghoe Koo 21 yard field goal, Eagles 26–17. Drive: 6 plays, 23 yards, TOP 2:56
- 6:32 ASU – JD Houston 35 yard field goal, Eagles 26–20. Drive: 10 plays, 71 yards, TOP 4:09
- 0:09 ASU – Omar Bayless 8 yard pass from Justice Hansen (JD Houston kick), Red Wolves 27–26. Drive: 13 plays, 70 yards, TOP 2:32

Leading Passers

- GS – Kevin Ellison, 14–22, 203 yards, 1 touchdown
- ASU – Justice Hansen, 16–27, 182 yards, 2 touchdowns, 2 interceptions

Leading Rushers

- GS – LA Ramsby, 6 carries, 68 yards, 1 touchdown
- ASU – Warren Wand, 19 carries, 140 yards, 1 touchdown

Leading Receivers

- GS – Myles Campbell, 6 receptions, 98 yards, 1 touchdown
- ASU – Kendall Sanders, 3 receptions, 52 yards

Leading Tacklers

- GS – Ukeme Eligwe, 10 tackles
- ASU – Xavier Woodson–Luster, 14 tackles

=== @ Georgia Tech ===
Week Seven: Georgia Southern Eagles at Georgia Tech Yellow Jackets – Game summary

Quarter	1	2	3	4	Total
Eagles	7	3	0	14	24
Yellow Jackets	21	0	0	14	35

at Bobby Dodd Stadium, Atlanta, GA

- Date: October 15
- Game time: 12:30 p.m. EDT
- Game weather: 73°F • E 8 • Partly cloudy
- Game attendance: 47,609
- Referee: Jeff Heaser
- TV: ACCRSN
- Georgia Southern vs Georgia Tech

Game information

First quarter

- 13:48 GT – Justin Thomas 58 yard run (Harrison Butker kick), Yellow Jackets 7–0. Drive: 3 plays, 75 yards, TOP 1:12
- 10:53 GT – Clinton Lynch 65 yard pass from Justin Thomas (Harrison Butker kick), Yellow Jackets 14–0. Drive: 2 plays, 71 yards, TOP 1:20
- 4:02 GS – LA Ramsby 1 yard run (Younghoe Koo kick), Yellow Jackets 14–7. Drive: 18 plays, 75 yards, TOP 6:51
- 0:48 GT – Dedrick Mills 6 yard run (Harrison Butker kick), Yellow Jackets 21–7. Drive: 6 plays, 75 yards, TOP 3:14

Second quarter

- 2:13 GS – Younghoe Koo 44 yard field goal, Yellow Jackets 21–10. Drive: 14 plays, 49 yards, TOP 7:17

Third quarter

- No Scoring

Fourth quarter

- 13:25 GT – Justin Thomas 4 yard run (Harrison Butker kick), Yellow Jackets 28–10. Drive: 11 plays, 90 yards, TOP 6:34
- 9:38 GS – L.A. Ramsby 1 yard run (Younghoe Koo kick), Yellow Jackets 28–17. Drive: 10 plays, 75 yards, TOP 3:40
- 3:58 GT – Dedrick Mills 20 yard run (Harrison Butker kick), Yellow Jackets 35–17. Drive: 9 plays, 61 yards, TOP 5:30
- 1:03 GS – BJ Johnson III 3 yard pass from Kevin Ellison (Younghoe Koo kick), Yellow Jackets 35–24. Drive: 12 plays, 75 yards, TOP 2:55

Leading Passers

- GS – Kevin Ellison, 10–17, 102 yards, 1 touchdown
- GT – Justin Thomas, 7–11, 172 yards, 1 touchdown

Leading Rushers

- GS – Matt Breida, 13 carries, 58 yards
- GT – Dedrick Mills, 13 carries, 89 yards, 2 touchdowns

Leading Receivers

- GS – BJ Johnson III, 3 receptions, 42 yards, 1 touchdown
- GT – Clinton Lynch, 2 receptions, 81 yards, 1 touchdown

Leading Tacklers

- GS – Ironhead Gallon, 10 tackles
- GT – Corey Griffin, 10 tackles

=== @ New Mexico State ===
Week Eight: Georgia Southern Eagles at New Mexico State Aggies – Game summary

Quarter	1	2	3	4	Total
Eagles	3	3	3	13	22
Aggies	0	9	3	7	19

at Aggie Memorial Stadium, Las Cruces, NM

- Date: October 22
- Game time: 8:00 p.m. EDT
- Game weather: 78°F • SSW 5 • Partly cloudy
- Game attendance: 10,085
- Referee: Jeff Hilyer
- TV: FSSW/FSAZ
- Georgia Southern vs New Mexico State

Game information

First quarter

- 9:43 GS – Younghoe Koo 25 yard field goal, Eagles 3–0. Drive: 13 plays, 67 yards, TOP 5:17

Second quarter

- 14:53 GS – Younghoe Koo 22 yard field goal, Eagles 6–0. Drive: 13 plays, 75 yards, TOP 4:27
- 12:04 NMSU – OJ Clark 6 yard pass from Tyler Rogers (Parker Davidson kick failed), Tied 6–6. Drive: 9 plays, 75 yards, TOP 2:49
- 7:03 NMSU – Parker Davidson 41 yard field goal, Aggies 9–6. Drive: 9 plays, 63 yards, TOP 2:40

Third quarter

- 11:22 NMSU – Parker Davidson 30 yard field goal, Aggies 12–6. Drive: 11 plays, 66 yards, TOP 3:32
- 0:59 GS – Younghoe Koo 29 yard field goal, Aggies 12–9. Drive: 8 plays, 28 yards, TOP 3:34

Fourth quarter

- 14:54 GS – Matt Breida 9 yard pass from Kevin Ellison (Younghoe Koo kick failed), Eagles 15–12. Drive: 3 plays, 13 yards, TOP 0:56
- 10:21 GS – Wesley Fields 42 yard pass from Kevin Ellison (Younghoe Koo kick), Eagles 22–12. Drive: 3 plays, 40 yards, TOP 1:23
- 1:19 NMSU – Johnathan Boone 32 yard pass from Tyler Rogers (Parker Davidson kick), Eagles 22–19. Drive: 5 plays, 67 yards, TOP 0:53

Leading Passers

- GS – Kevin Ellison, 7–8, 101 yards, 2 touchdowns, 1 interception
- NMSU – Tyler Rogers, 22–36, 236 yards, 2 touchdowns, 1 interception

Leading Rushers

- GS – Kevin Ellison, 20 carries, 117 yards
- NMSU – Larry Rose, 22 carries, 81 yards

Leading Receivers

- GS – Wesley Fields, 1 reception, 42 yards, 1 touchdown
- NMSU – Izaiah Lottie, 3 receptions, 47 yards

Leading Tacklers

- GS – Chris DeLaRosa, 10 tackles
- NMSU – Rodney Butler, 13 tackles

=== Appalachian State ===
Week Nine: Appalachian State Mountaineers at Georgia Southern Eagles – Game summary

Quarter	1	2	3	4	Total
Mountaineers	0	10	10	14	34
Eagles	10	0	0	0	10

at Paulson Stadium, Statesboro, GA

- Date: October 27
- Game time: 7:30 p.m. EDT
- Game weather: 72°F • SSE 5 • Mostly clear
- Game attendance: 23,474
- Referee: Kevin Stine
- TV: ESPNU
- Georgia Southern vs Appalachian State

Game information

First quarter

- 9:02 GS – Younghoe Koo 32 yard field goal, Eagles 3–0. Drive: 6 plays, 14 yards, TOP 2:48
- 0:58 GS – Ukeme Eligwe 90 yard fumble return (Younghoe Koo kick), Eagles 10–0. Drive: 13 plays, 65 yards, TOP 8:04

Second quarter

- 6:22 ASU – Taylor Lamb 14 yard run (Michael Rubino kick), Eagles 10–7. Drive: 4 plays, 58 yards, TOP 1:38
- 1:15 ASU – Michael Rubino 32 yard field goal, Tied 10–10. Drive: 7 plays, 14 yards, TOP 2:30

Third quarter

- 3:03 ASU – Michael Rubino 28 yard field goal, Mountaineers 13–10. Drive: 13 plays, 41 yards, TOP 7:17
- 1:45 ASU – Taylor Lamb 30 yard run (Michael Rubino kick), Mountaineers 20–10. Drive: 2 plays, 52 yards, TOP 0:42

Fourth quarter

- 11:53 ASU – Marcus Cox 12 yard run (Michael Rubino kick), Mountaineers 27–10. Drive: 8 plays, 88 yards, TOP 3:14
- 3:26 ASU – Jalin Moore 15 yard run (Michael Rubino kick), Mountaineers 34–10. Drive: 5 plays, 81 yards, TOP 2:38

Leading Passers

- ASU – Taylor Lamb, 16–27, 199 yards, 2 interceptions
- GS – Seth Shuman, 9–23, 73 yards, 2 interceptions

Leading Rushers

- ASU – Jalin Moore, 15 carries, 126 yards, 1 touchdown
- GS – Matt Brieda, 7 carries, 28 yards

Leading Receivers

- ASU – Shaedon Meadors, 6 receptions, 126 yards
- GS – D'Ondre Glenn, 1 reception, 28 yards

Leading Tacklers

- ASU – Eric Noggs, 6 tackles
- GS – Ukeme Eligwe, 12 tackles

=== @ Ole Miss ===
Week Ten: Georgia Southern Eagles at Ole Miss Rebels – Game summary

Quarter	1	2	3	4	Total
Eagles	14	7	3	3	27
Rebels	3	28	3	3	37

at Vaught–Hemingway Stadium, Oxford, MS

- Date: November 5
- Game time: 12:00 p.m. EDT
- Game weather: Partly Cloudy • Temperature: 65 °F (18 °C)
- Game attendance: 60,263
- Referee: Matt Loeffler
- TV announcers (ESPNU): Eamon McAnaney (play-by-play) and John Congemi (color)
- Georgia Southern vs Ole Miss

Game information

First quarter

- (9:01) Ole Miss – Gary Wunderlich 35 yard field goal
  Ole Miss 3–0; 7 plays, 33 yards, 1:59
- (5:08) Georgia Southern – Myles Campbell 29 yard pass from Kevin Ellison (Younghoe Koo kick)
  Georgia Southern 7–3; 8 plays, 69 yards, 3:53
- (0:59) Georgia Southern – Kevin Ellison 9 yard run (Younghoe Koo kick)
  Georgia Southern 14–3; 5 plays, 49 yards, 2:19

Second quarter

- (11:38) Ole Miss – Chad Kelly 3 yard run (Gary Wunderlich kick)
  Georgia Southern 14–10; 7 plays, 71 yards, 1:48
- (10:13) Georgia Southern – Matt Breida 68 yard run (Younghoe Koo kick)
  Georgia Southern 21–10; 3 plays, 75 yards, 1:25
- (8:20) Ole Miss – Chad Kelly 5 yard run (Gary Wunderlich)
  Georgia Southern 21–17; 5 plays, 41 yards, 1:53
- (3:36) Ole Miss – Akeem Judd 9 yard run (Gary Wunderlich kick)
  Ole Miss 24–21; 7 plays, 56 yards, 1:26
- (2:06) Ole Miss – Evan Engram 38 yard pass from Chad Kelly (Gary Wunderlich kick)
  Ole Miss 31–21; 2 plays, 65 yards, 0:36

Third quarter

- (3:02) Georgia Southern – Younghoe Koo 41 yard field goal
  Ole Miss 31–24; 13 plays, 70 yards, 6:15
- (0:13) Ole Miss – Gary Wunderlich 29 yard field goal
  Ole Miss 34–24; 9 plays, 63 yards, 2:49

Fourth quarter

- (12:09) Georgia Southern – Younghoe Koo 38 yard field goal
  Ole Miss 34–27; 8 plays, 70 yards, 3:04
- (7:14) Ole Miss – Gary Wunderlich 38 yard field goal
  Ole Miss 37–27; 7 plays, 35 yards, 2:31

Leading Passers

- GS – Kevin Ellison, 7–16, 134 yards, 1 touchdown, 1 interception
- UM – Chad Kelly, 16–23, 226 yards, 1 touchdown

Leading Rushers

- GS – Matt Breida, 22 carries, 100 yards, 1 touchdown
- UM – Akeem Judd, 26 carries, 139 yards, 1 touchdown

Leading Receivers

- GS – Myles Campbell, 4 receptions, 121 yards, 1 touchdown
- UM – Evan Engram, 4 receptions, 75 yards, 1 touchdown

Leading Tacklers

- GS – Joshua Moon, 11 tackles
- UM – Fadol Brown, 14 tackles

=== Louisiana–Lafayette ===
Week Eleven: Louisiana–Lafayette Ragin' Cajuns at Georgia Southern Eagles – Game summary

Quarter	1	2	3	4	Total
Ragin' Cajuns	7	14	10	2	33
Eagles	3	10	0	13	26

at Paulson Stadium, Statesboro, GA

- Date: November 10
- Game time: 7:30 p.m. EST
- Game weather: 49 °F (9 °C) • Calm
- Game attendance: 16,786
- Referee: Charles Lewis
- TV: ESPNU
- Georgia Southern vs Louisiana–Lafayette

Game information

First quarter

- GASO - Younghoe Koo 39-yard field goal, 10:44 (GASO 3-0)
- ULL - Elijah McGuire 1-yard TD run, Stevie Artigue kick good, 3:15 (ULL 7-3)

Second quarter

- GASO - Koo 27-yard field goal, 10:48 (ULL 7-6)
- ULL - Dion Ray 16-yard TD run, Artigue kick good, 6:09 (ULL 14-6)
- GASO - Myles Campbell 10-yard TD pass from Seth Shuman, Koo kick good, 1:18 (ULL 14-13)
- ULL - Anthony Jennings 10-yard TD run, Artigue kick good, 0:06 (ULL 21-13)

Third quarter

- ULL - Artigue 34-yard field goal, 8:51 (ULL 24-13)
- ULL - Keenan Barnes 48-yard TD pass from Al Riles, Artigue kick good, 6:34 (ULL 31-13)

Fourth quarter

- GASO - L.A. Ramsby 2-yard TD run, two-point pass conversion no good, 13:05 (ULL 31-19)
- ULL - Otha Peters defensive PAT conversion, 13:05 (ULL 33-19)
- GASO - L.A. Ramsby 1-yard TD run, Koo kick good, 4:23 (ULL 33-26)

Leading Passers

- ULL – Anthony Jennings, 17–26, 210 yards
- GS – Seth Shuman, 21–36, 228 yards, 1 touchdown

Leading Rushers

- ULL – Anthony Jennings, 9 carries, 96 yards, 1 touchdown
- GS – Seth Shuman, 5 carries, 20 yards

Leading Receivers

- ULL – Keenan Barnes, 3 receptions, 89 yards, 1 touchdown
- GS – BJ Johnson III, 9 receptions, 127 yards

Leading Tacklers

- ULL – Otha Peters, 8 tackles, fumble recovery, safety
- GS – Ukeme Eligwe, 12 tackles

=== @ Georgia State ===
Week Twelve: Georgia Southern Eagles at Georgia State Panthers – Game summary

Quarter	1	2	3	4	Total
Eagles	7	10	0	7	24
Panthers	20	0	10	0	30

at Georgia Dome, Atlanta, GA

- Date: November 19
- Game time: 2:00 p.m. EST
- Game weather: Played indoors (dome stadium)
- Game attendance: 23,513
- Referee: Jason McArthur
- TV: ESPN3
- Georgia Southern vs Georgia State

Game information

First quarter

- 12:06 GSU – Glenn Smith 29 yard run (Roger Ten Lohuis kick), Panthers 7–0. Drive: 7 plays, 75 yards, TOP 2:54
- 10:10 GSU – Conner Manning 1-yard run (Roger Ten Lohuis kick blocked), Panthers 13–0. Drive: 4 plays, 26 yards, TOP 0:59
- 6:55 GSU – Robert Davis 28-yard pass from Conner Manning (Roger Ten Lohuis kick), Panthers 20–0. Drive: 3 plays, 70 yards, TOP 0:56
- 3:40 GS – Kevin Ellison 24-yard run (Younghoe Koo kick), Panthers 20–7. Drive: 7 plays, 78 yards, TOP 3:15

Second quarter

- 14:57 GS – Matt Breida 3-yard run (Younghoe Koo kick), Panthers 20–14. Drive: 4 plays, 27 yards, TOP 1:29
- 0:00 GS – Younghoe Koo 43-yard field goal, Panthers 20–17. Drive: 3 plays, 15 yards, TOP 0:34

Third quarter

- 7:59 GSU – Glenn Smith 15-yard pass from Conner Manning (Brandon Wright kick), Panthers 27–17. Drive: 11 plays, 83 yards, TOP 4:25
- 1:00 GSU – Brandon Wright 27-yard field goal, Panthers 30–17. Drive: 9 plays, 29 yards, TOP 2:15

Fourth quarter

- 4:42) GS – LA Ramsby 1-yard run (Younghoe Koo kick), Panthers 30–24. Drive: 14 plays, 87 yards, TOP 5:25

Leading Passers

- GS – Favian Upshaw, 11–21, 91 yards
- GSU – Conner Manning, 21–39, 318 yards, 2 touchdowns

Leading Rushers

- GS – Kevin Ellison, 15 carries, 101 yards, 1 touchdown
- GSU – Glenn Smith, 5 carries, 37 yards, 1 touchdown

Leading Receivers

- GS – Montay Crockett, 4 receptions, 60 yards
- GSU – Keith Rucker, 8 receptions, 145 yards

Leading Tacklers

- GS – Ironhead Gallon, 10 tackles
- GSU – Alonzo McGee, 10 tackles

=== Troy ===
Week Fourteen: Troy Trojans at Georgia Southern Eagles – Game summary

Quarter	1	2	3	4	Total
Trojans	3	7	7	7	24
Eagles	0	7	14	7	28

at Paulson Stadium, Statesboro, GA

- Date: December 3
- Game time: 12:00 p.m. EST
- Game weather: Partly Cloudy, Seasonal • Temperature: 57 °F (14 °C) • Wind: ENE 6 mph
- Game attendance: 16,850
- Referee: Ted Pitts
- TV: ESPN2
- Georgia Southern vs Troy

Game information

First quarter

- 9:45 TU – Ryan Kay 37-yard field goal, Trojans 3–0. Drive: 4 plays, 7 yards, TOP 1:31

Second quarter

- 11:24 GS – BJ Johnson III 12-yard pass from Kevin Ellison (Younghoe Koo kick), Eagles 7–3. Drive: 12 plays, 56 yards, TOP 6:10
- 6:08 TU – Jordan Chunn 3-yard run (Ryan Kay kick), Trojans 10–7. Drive: 9 plays, 82 yards, TOP 5:09

Third quarter

- 12:09 GS – Kevin Ellison 24-yard run (Younghoe Koo kick), Eagles 14–10. Drive: 6 plays, 75 yards, TOP 2:51
- 9:28 GS – Kevin Ellison 54-yard run (Younghoe Koo kick), Eagles 21–10. Drive: 2 plays, 55 yards, TOP 0:49
- 2:28 TU – Tevaris McCormick 16-yard pass from Brandon Silvers (Ryan Kay kick), Eagles 21–17. Drive: 7 plays, 54 yards, TOP 1:50

Fourth quarter

- 12:22 TU – Jordan Chunn 4-yard run (Ryan Kay kick), Trojans 24–21. Drive: 5 plays, 48 yards, TOP 1:56
- 9:46 GS – BJ Johnson III 64-yard pass from Kevin Ellison (Younghoe Koo kick), Eagles 28–24. Drive: 6 plays, 75 yards, TOP 2:36

Leading Passers

- TU – Brandon Silvers, 27–34, 218 yards, 1 touchdown
- GS – Kevin Ellison, 10–14, 127 yards, 2 touchdowns

Leading Rushers

- TU – Jordan Chunn, 19 carries, 79 yards, 2 touchdowns
- GS – Kevin Ellison, 10 carries, 115 yards, 2 touchdowns

Leading Receivers

- TU – Emanuel Thompson, 7 receptions, 96 yards
- GS – BJ Johnson III, 7 receptions, 129 yards, 2 touchdowns

Leading Tacklers

- TU – William Lloyd, 8 tackles
- GS – Ukeme Eliqwe, 18 tackles
