= 2016 Louisiana–Monroe Warhawks football team =

American college football season

2016 Louisiana–Monroe Warhawks football
- Conference: Sun Belt Conference
- Record: 4–8 (3–5 Sun Belt)
- Head coach: Matt Viator (1st season)
- Offensive coordinator: Matt Kubik (1st season)
- Offensive scheme: Multiple
- Defensive coordinator: Mike Collins (1st season)
- Base defense: 4–2–5
- Home stadium: Malone Stadium

2016 Sun Belt Conference football standings
	Conf.			Overall
Team	W		L	W		L
Appalachian State +	7	–	1	10	–	3
Arkansas State +	7	–	1	8	–	5
Troy	6	–	2	10	–	3
Idaho	6	–	2	9	–	4
Louisiana–Lafayette	5	–	3	6	–	7
Georgia Southern	4	–	4	5	–	7
Louisiana–Monroe	3	–	5	4	–	8
South Alabama	2	–	6	6	–	7
Georgia State	2	–	6	3	–	9
New Mexico State	2	–	6	3	–	9
Texas State	0	–	8	2	–	10
+ – Conference co-champions

The 2016 Louisiana–Monroe Warhawks football team represented the University of Louisiana at Monroe in the 2016 NCAA Division I FBS football season. The Warhawks, led by first-year head coach Matt Viator, played their home games at Malone Stadium and were members of the Sun Belt Conference.

== Schedule ==
Date	Time	Opponent	Site	TV	Result	Attendance
September 3	6:00 pm	Southern*	Malone Stadium; Monroe, LA	ESPN3	W 38–21	24,718
September 10	6:00 pm	at No. 14 Oklahoma*	Gaylord Family Oklahoma Memorial Stadium; Norman, OK	FSN	L 17–59	87,037
September 17	5:00 pm	at Georgia Southern	Paulson Stadium; Statesboro, GA	ESPN3	L 21–23	25,735
October 1	2:30 pm	at Auburn*	Jordan–Hare Stadium; Auburn, AL	SECN Alt	L 7–58	84,243
October 8	6:00 pm	Idaho	Malone Stadium; Monroe, LA	ESPN3	L 31–34	9,524
October 15	6:00 pm	Texas State^{†}	Malone Stadium; Monroe, LA	ESPN3	W 40–34	12,735
October 22	8:00 pm	at New Mexico*	University Stadium; Albuquerque, NM	RTSW	L 17–59	18,099
October 29	6:00 pm	at Arkansas State	Centennial Bank Stadium; Jonesboro, AR	ESPN3	L 10–51	20,170
November 5	4:00 pm	South Alabama	Malone Stadium; Monroe, LA	ESPN3	W 42–35 ^{OT}	16,073
November 12	1:00 pm	at Georgia State	Georgia Dome; Atlanta, GA	ESPN3	W 37–23	13,106
November 19	1:30 pm	at Appalachian State	Kidd Brewer Stadium; Boone, NC	ESPN3	L 17–42	18,699
December 3	2:00 pm	Louisiana–Lafayette	Malone Stadium; Monroe, LA (Battle on the Bayou)	ESPN3	L 3–30	4,007
*Non-conference game; ^{†}Homecoming; Rankings from Coaches' Poll released prior to the game; All times are in Central time

Schedule source:

== Game summaries ==
=== Southern ===
Week One: Southern Jaguars at Louisiana–Monroe Warhawks – Game summary

Quarter	1	2	3	4	Total
Jaguars	9	3	3	6	21
Warhawks	14	0	10	14	38

at Malone Stadium, Monroe, LA

- Date: September 3
- Game time: 6:00 p.m. CDT
- Game weather: Temperature: 87 • Wind: NE 8 • Weather: Clear skies
- Game attendance: 24,718
- Referee: Ted Pitts
- TV announcers (ESPN3): Brett Dolan, Brian Kinchen

Game information

First quarter

- (11:37) SU FG: Ruan Albuquerque 42-yard field goal.
- (8:21) ULM TD: Garrett Smith 13-yard pass to Jared Mapps (Craig Ford PAT).
- (3:16) ULM TD: Ben Luckett 30-yard rush (Craig Ford PAT).
- (0:14) SU TD: Lenard Tillery 2-yard rush (PAT no good).

Second quarter

- (0:59) SU FG: Ruan Albuquerque 38-yard field goal.

Third quarter

- (7:17) ULM TD: Garrett Smith 28-yard pass to Marcus Green (Craig Ford PAT).
- (3:00) ULM FG: Craig Ford 24-yard field goal.
- (0:19) SU FG: Ruan Albuquerque 28-yard field goal.

Fourth quarter

- (14:34) ULM TD: Garrett Smith 13-yard rush (Craig Ford PAT).
- (8:11) SU TD: Austin Howard 9-yard pass to Willie Quinn (2-pt. no good)
- (0:50) ULM TD: Austin Vaughn 6-yard rush (Craig Ford PAT).

Leading Passers

- SU – Austin Howard: 17–31, 137 yds, 1 TD, 1 INT
- ULM – Garrett Smith: 20–33, 208 yds, 2 TD, 2 INT

Leading Rushers

- SU – Lenard Tillery: 26 car, 161 yds, 1 TD
- ULM – Garrett Smith: 14 car, 150 yds, 1 TD

Leading Receivers

- SU – Willie Quinn: 9 rec, 64 yds, 1 TD
- ULM – Marcus Green: 3 rec, 49 yds, 1 TD

=== @ Oklahoma ===
Week Two: Louisiana–Monroe Warhawks at Oklahoma Sooners – Game summary

Quarter	1	2	3	4	Total
Warhawks	0	0	17	0	17
#14 Sooners	21	21	3	14	59

at Gaylord Family Oklahoma Memorial Stadium, Norman, OK

- Date: September 10
- Game time: 6:00 p.m. CDT
- Game weather: Temperature: 77 °F (25 °C) • Wind:N 16 • Weather: Clear
- Game attendance: 87,037
- Referee: Brandon Cruse
- TV announcers (Fox Sports Oklahoma): Brendan Burke (Play-by-play), Brian Baldinger (color) & Christian Steckel (sideline)

Game information

First quarter

- (12:53) OU TD: Baker Mayfield 39-yard pass to Mark Andrews (Austin Seibert PAT).
- (8:17) OU TD: Baker Mayfield 8-yard pass to Dimitri Flowers (Austin Seibert PAT).
- (3:07) OU TD: Samaje Perine 1-yard rush (Austin Seibert PAT).

Second quarter

- (14:49) OU TD: Jarvis Baxter 40-yard rush (Austin Seibert PAT).
- (9:17) OU TD: Baker Mayfield 62-yard pass to Nick Basquine (Austin Seibert PAT).
- (1:03) OU TD: Samaje Perine 5-yard rush (Austin Seibert PAT).

Third quarter

- (13:41) ULM TD: Garrett Smith 73-yard pass to R.J. Turner (Craig Ford PAT).
- (9:41) OU TD: Austin Seibert 39-yard field goal.
- (7:50) ULM TD: Garrett Smith 43-yard pass to Alec Osborne (Craig Ford PAT).
- (3:06) ULM FG: Craig Ford 42-yard field goal.

Fourth quarter

- (9:26) OU TD: Austin Kendall 3-yard pass to A.D. Miller (Austin Seibert PAT).
- (7:01) OU TD: Austin Kendall 6-yard pass to Jeffery Mead (Austin Seibert PAT).

Leading Passers

- ULM – Garrett Smith: 22–35, 251 yds, 2 TD
- OU – Baker Mayfield: 14–20, 244 yds, 3 TD

Leading Rushers

- ULM – Ben Luckett: 9 car, 34 yds
- OU – Joe Mixon: 13 car, 117 yds

Leading Receivers

- ULM – R.J. Turner: 7 rec, 135 yds, 1 TD
- OU – Nick Basquine: 3 rec, 80 yds, 1 TD

=== @ Georgia Southern ===
Week Three: Louisiana–Monroe Warhawks at Georgia Southern Eagles – Game summary

Quarter	1	2	3	4	Total
Warhawks	14	0	0	7	21
Eagles	7	3	6	7	23

at Paulson Stadium, Statesboro, GA

- Date: September 17
- Game time: 5:00 p.m. CDT
- Game weather: 88°F • E 7 • Partly cloudy
- Game attendance: 25,735
- Referee: Jason Autrey
- TV: ESPN3

Game information

First quarter

- 10:26 ULM – Xavier Brown 32 yard pass from Garrett Smith (Craig Ford kick), Warhawks 7–0. Drive: 3 plays, 51 yards, TOP 0:37
- 2:39 ULM – Garrett Smith 7 yard run (Craig Ford kick), Warhawks 14–0. Drive: 3 plays, 72 yards, TOP 1:03
- 0:07 GS – Kevin Ellison 6 yard run (Younghoe Koo kick), Warhawks 14–7. Drive: 9 plays, 74 yards, TOP 2:24

Second quarter

- 3:58 GS – Younghoe Koo 32 yard field goal, Warhawks 14–10. Drive: 14 plays, 75 yards, TOP 3:44

Third quarter

- 10:22 GS – Younghoe Koo 37 yard field goal, Warhawks 14–13. Drive: 13 plays, 49 yards, TOP 4:33
- 7:32 GS – Younghoe Koo 43 yard field goal, Eagles 16–14. Drive: 5 plays, 13 yards, TOP 1:58

Fourth quarter

- 12:51 GS – Wesley Fields 2 yard run (Younghoe Koo kick), Eagles 23–14. Drive: 8 plays, 48 yards, TOP 3:31
- 10:21 ULM – Marcus Green 10 yard pass from Garrett Smith (Craig Ford kick), Eagles 23–21. Drive: 6 plays, 75 yards, TOP 2:39

Leading Passers

- ULM – Garrett Smith, 17–33, 283 yards, 2 touchdowns, 1 interception
- GS – Favian Upshaw, 4–14, 64 yards

Leading Rushers

- ULM – Garrett Smith, 14 carries, 22 yards, 1 touchdown
- GS – LA Ramsby, 14 carries, 86 yards

Leading Receivers

- ULM – Marcus Green, 2 receptions, 75 yards, 1 touchdown
- GS – BJ Johnson III, 4 receptions, 59 yards

Leading Tacklers

- ULM – David Griffith, 11 tackles
- GS – Ironhead Gallon, 10 tackles

=== @ Auburn ===
Week Five: Louisiana–Monroe Warhawks at Auburn Tigers – Game summary

Quarter	1	2	3	4	Total
Warhawks	0	7	0	0	7
Tigers	14	14	28	2	58

at Jordan–Hare Stadium, Auburn, AL

- Date: October 1
- Game time: 2:31 p.m. CDT
- Game weather: Temperature: 80 °F (27 °C) • Wind WSW 5 mph (8.0 km/h) • Weather: Sunny
- Game attendance: 84,243
- Referee: David Smith
- TV announcers (SEC Network Alternate): Taylor Zarzour (play-by-play), Jordan Rodgers (analyst), Lauren Sisler (sideline reporter)

Game information

First quarter

- AUB – Sean White 3 yd run (Daniel Carlson kick), 8:42 (AUB 7-0)
- AUB – Kyle Davis 48 yd pass from Sean White (Daniel Carlson kick), 2:31 (AUB 14-0)

Second quarter

- AUB – Kerryon Johnson 1 yd run (Daniel Carlson kick), 12:12 (AUB 21-0)
- AUB – Kerryon Johnson 2 yd run (Daniel Carlson kick), 4:05 (AUB 28-0)
- ULM – Marcus Green 2 yd pass from Garrett Smith (Craig Ford kick), 0:00 (AUB 28-7)

Third quarter

- AUB – Tony Stevens 48 yd pass from Sean White (Daniel Carlson kick), 12:28 (AUB 35-7)
- AUB – Malik Miller 4 yd run (Daniel Carlson kick), 7:30 (AUB 42-7)
- AUB – John Franklin 80 yd run (Daniel Carlson kick), 5:09 (AUB 49-7)
- AUB – Nate Craig-Myers 39 yd pass from John Franklin (Daniel Carlson kick), 1:08 (AUB 56-7)

Fourth quarter

- AUB – Gary Walker safety, 0:31 (AUB 58-7)

Leading Passers

- ULM – Garrett Smith – 19/33, 139 yards, TD, INT
- AU – Sean White – 14/17, 239 yards, 2 TD

Leading Rushers

- ULM – Ben Luckett – 11 carries, 31 yards
- AU – Kerryon Johnson – 24 carries, 146 yards, 2 TD

Leading Receivers

- ULM – Marcus Green – 7 receptions, 40 yards, TD
- AU – Ryan Davis – 5 receptions, 56 yards

Leading Tacklers

- ULM – Cortez Sisco – 12 tackles
- AU – Tre' Williams – 9 tackles

=== Idaho ===
Week Six: Idaho Vandals at Louisiana–Monroe Warhawks – Game summary

Quarter	1	2	3	4	Total
Vandals	16	8	7	3	34
Warhawks	0	21	3	7	31

at Malone Stadium, Monroe, LA

- Date: October 8
- Game time: 6:00 p.m. CDT
- Game weather: Clear, 77 °F (25 °C)
- Game attendance: 9,524
- Referee: Jason McArthur
- TV: ESPN3

Game information

First quarter

- IDHO – Austin Rehkow 28-yard field goal, 9:01. Vandals 3–0. Drive: 15 plays, 64 yards, 5:59.
- IDHO – Austin Rehkow 34-yard field goal, 6:56. Vandals 6–0. Drive: 4 plays, 1 yard, 1:03.
- IDHO – Austin Rehkow 32-yard field goal, 2:36. Vandals 9–0. Drive: 9 plays, 20 yards, 3:33.
- IDHO – Kendrick Trotter 19-yard blocked punt return (Austin Rehkow kick), 1:18. Vandals 16–0.

Second quarter

- ULM – Ben Luckett 31-yard run (Craig Ford kick), 13:31. Vandals 16–7. Drive: 8 plays, 78 yards, 2:47.
- IDHO – Aaron Duckworth 2-yard run (Matt Linehan pass to David Ungerer), 10:59. Vandals 24–7. Drive: 5 plays, 73 yards, 2:32.
- ULM – Garrett Smith 6-yard run (Craig Ford kick), 7:42. Vandals 24–14. Drive: 9 plays, 75 yards, 3:17.
- ULM – Xavier Brown 44-yard pass from Garrett Smith (Craig Ford kick), 1:25. Vandals 24–21. Drive: 11 plays, 90 yards, 2:45.

Third quarter

- ULM – Craig Ford 31-yard field goal, 6:40. Tied 24–24. Drive: 10 plays, 79 yards, 4:34.
- IDHO – Jordan Frysinger 71-yard pass from Matt Linehan (Austin Rehkow kick), 5:46. Vandals 31–24. Drive: 2 plays, 69 yards, 0:54.

Fourth quarter

- ULM – Ajalen Holley 30-yard pass from Garrett Smith (Craig Ford kick), 2:28. Tied 31–31. Drive: 5 plays, 80 yards, 1:52.
- IDHO – Austin Rehkow 27-yard field goal, 0:00. Vandals 34–31. Drive: 6 plays, 67 yards, 2:28.

Leading Passers

- UI – Matt Linehan – 21/38, 211 yards, TD
- ULM – Garrett Smith – 20/38, 302 yards, 2 TD, 3 INT

Leading Rushers

- UI – Aaron Duckworth – 16 carries, 121 yards, TD
- ULM – Garrett Smith – 13 carries, 88 yards, TD

Leading Receivers

- UI – Jordan Frysinger – 4 receptions, 100 yards, TD
- ULM – Xavier Brown – 3 receptions, 96 yards, TD

Leading Tacklers

- UI – Tueni Lupeamanu – 8 tackles
- ULM – Nick Ingram – 10 tackles

=== Texas State ===
Week Seven: Texas State Bobcats at Louisiana–Monroe Warhawks – Game summary

Quarter	1	2	3	4	Total
Bobcats	14	0	7	13	34
Warhawks	10	23	7	0	40

at Malone Stadium, Monroe, LA

- Date: October 15
- Game time: CDT

Game information

First quarter
Second quarter
Third quarter
Fourth quarter

Leading Passers

- TSU –
- ULM –

Leading Rushers

- TSU –
- ULM –

Leading Receivers

- TSU –
- ULM –

Leading Tacklers

- TSU –
- ULM –

=== @ New Mexico ===
Week Eight: Louisiana–Monroe Warhawks at New Mexico Lobos – Game summary

Quarter	1	2	3	4	Total
Warhawks	0	3	0	14	17
Lobos	28	7	17	7	59

at University Stadium, Albuquerque, NM

- Date: October 22
- Game time: CDT

Game information

First quarter
Second quarter
Third quarter
Fourth quarter

Leading Passers

- ULM –
- UNM –

Leading Rushers

- ULM –
- UNM –

Leading Receivers

- ULM –
- UNM –

Leading Tacklers

- ULM –
- UNM –

=== @ Arkansas State ===
Week Nine: Louisiana–Monroe Warhawks at Arkansas State Red Wolves – Game summary

Quarter	1	2	3	4	Total
Warhawks	0	3	7	0	10
Red Wolves	14	28	9	0	51

at Centennial Bank Stadium, Jonesboro, AR

- Date: October 29
- Game time: CDT

Game information

First quarter
Second quarter
Third quarter
Fourth quarter

Leading Passers

- ULM –
- ASU –

Leading Rushers

- ULM –
- ASU –

Leading Receivers

- ULM –
- ASU –

Leading Tacklers

- ULM –
- ASU –

=== South Alabama ===
Week Ten: South Alabama Jaguars at Louisiana–Monroe Warhawks – Game summary

Quarter	1	2	3	4	OT	Total
Jaguars	7	7	14	7	0	35
Warhawks	7	7	7	14	7	42

at Malone Stadium, Monroe, LA

- Date: November 5
- Game time: CDT

Game information

First quarter
Second quarter
Third quarter
Fourth quarter

Leading Passers

- USA –
- ULM –

Leading Rushers

- USA –
- ULM –

Leading Receivers

- USA –
- ULM –

Leading Tacklers

- USA –
- ULM –

=== @ Georgia State ===
Week Eleven: Louisiana–Monroe Warhawks at Georgia State Panthers – Game summary

Quarter	1	2	3	4	Total
Warhawks	2	7	21	7	37
Panthers	0	7	13	3	23

at Georgia Dome, Atlanta, GA

- Date: November 12
- Game time: CST

Game information

First quarter
Second quarter
Third quarter
Fourth quarter

Leading Passers

- ULM –
- GSU –

Leading Rushers

- ULM –
- GSU –

Leading Receivers

- ULM –
- GSU –

Leading Tacklers

- ULM –
- GSU –

=== @ Appalachian State ===
Week Twelve: Louisiana–Monroe Warhawks at Appalachian State Mountaineers – Game summary

Quarter	1	2	3	4	Total
Warhawks	3	7	0	7	17
Mountaineers	14	7	14	7	42

at Kidd Brewer Stadium, Boone, NC

- Date: November 19
- Game time: CST
- Game attendance: 18,699

Game information

First quarter
Second quarter
Third quarter
Fourth quarter

Leading Passers

- ULM –
- ASU –

Leading Rushers

- ULM –
- ASU –

Leading Receivers

- ULM –
- ASU –

Leading Tacklers

- ULM –
- ASU –

=== Louisiana–Lafayette ===
Week Fourteen: Louisiana–Lafayette Ragin' Cajuns at Louisiana–Monroe Warhawks – Game summary

Quarter	1	2	3	4	Total
Ragin' Cajuns	7	17	6	0	30
Warhawks	3	0	0	0	3

at Malone Stadium, Monroe, LA

- Date: December 3
- Game time: 2:00 p.m. CST
- Game weather: 48 °F (9 °C); cloudy, rain
- Game attendance: 4,007
- Referee: Kevin Stine
- TV: ESPN3

Game information

First quarter

- ULL - Elijah McGuire 1-yard TD run, Stevie Artigue kick good, 8:53 (ULL 7-0)
- ULM - Craig Ford 23-yard field goal, 5:22 (ULL 7-3)

Second quarter

- ULL - Trev Miller 73-yard fumble return for TD, Artigue kick good, 10:28 (ULL 14-3)
- ULL - Otha Peters 29-yard fumble return for TD, Artigue kick good, 5:10 (ULL 21-3)
- ULL - Artigue 26-yard field goal, 0:00 (ULL 24-3)

Third quarter

- ULL - Artigue 35-yard field goal, 7:08 (ULL 27-3)
- ULL - Artigue 37-yard field goal, 0:23 (ULL 30-3)

Fourth quarter

No scoring plays

Leading Passers

- ULL – Anthony Jennings - 2/5, 0 yards, 2 INT
- ULM – Caleb Evans - 3/14, 31 yards, 2 INT

Leading Rushers

- ULL – Elijah McGuire - 28 carries, 110 yards, TD
- ULM – Austin Vaughn - 11 carries, 61 yards

Leading Receivers

- ULL – Al Riles - 1 reception, 0 yards
- ULM – Nathan Meadors Jr. - 1 reception, 15 yards

Leading Tacklers

- ULL – Karmichael Dunbar - 4 tackles
- ULM – Wesley Thompson - 15 tackles
