= 2016 Appalachian State Mountaineers football team =

American college football season

2016 Appalachian State Mountaineers football

Sun Belt co-champion Camellia Bowl champion

Camellia Bowl, W 31–28 vs. Toledo
- Conference: Sun Belt Conference
- Record: 10–3 (7–1 Sun Belt)
- Head coach: Scott Satterfield (4th season)
- Co-offensive coordinators: Frank Ponce (4th season); Shawn Clark (1st season)
- Offensive scheme: Spread option
- Defensive coordinator: Nate Woody (4th season)
- Base defense: 3–4
- Home stadium: Kidd Brewer Stadium

2016 Sun Belt Conference football standings
	Conf.			Overall
Team	W		L	W		L
Appalachian State +	7	–	1	10	–	3
Arkansas State +	7	–	1	8	–	5
Troy	6	–	2	10	–	3
Idaho	6	–	2	9	–	4
Louisiana–Lafayette	5	–	3	6	–	7
Georgia Southern	4	–	4	5	–	7
Louisiana–Monroe	3	–	5	4	–	8
South Alabama	2	–	6	6	–	7
Georgia State	2	–	6	3	–	9
New Mexico State	2	–	6	3	–	9
Texas State	0	–	8	2	–	10
+ – Conference co-champions

The 2016 Appalachian State Mountaineers football team represented Appalachian State University in the 2016 NCAA Division I FBS football season. The Mountaineers played their home games at Kidd Brewer Stadium in Boone, North Carolina and competed in the Sun Belt Conference. They were led by fourth-year head coach Scott Satterfield. They finished the season 10–3, 7–1 in Sun Belt play to win a share of the Sun Belt championship with Arkansas State. They were invited to the Camellia Bowl where they defeated Toledo.

== Schedule ==
Appalachian State announced its 2016 football schedule on March 3, 2016. The 2016 schedule consists of 6 home and away games in the regular season. The Mountaineers will host Sun Belt foes Georgia State, Idaho, Louisiana–Monroe, and Texas State, and will travel to Georgia Southern, Louisiana–Lafayette, New Mexico State, and Troy. Appalachian State will skip out on two Sun Belt teams this season, Arkansas State and South Alabama.

The team will play four non–conference games, two home games against Miami from the Atlantic Coast Conference (ACC) and Old Dominion from Conference USA, and two road games against Akron from the Mid-American Conference (MAC) and Tennessee from the Southeastern Conference (SEC).

Date	Time	Opponent	Site	TV	Result	Attendance
September 1	7:30 p.m.	at No. 9 Tennessee*	Neyland Stadium; Knoxville, TN (SEC Nation)	SECN	L 13–20 ^{OT}	100,074
September 10	3:30 p.m.	Old Dominion*	Kidd Brewer Stadium; Boone, NC	ASN	W 31–7	23,374
September 17	Noon	No. 25 Miami (FL)*	Kidd Brewer Stadium; Boone, NC	ESPN	L 10–45	34,658
September 24	3:30 p.m.	at Akron*	InfoCision Stadium; Akron, OH	ASN	W 45–38	15,381
October 1	Noon	Georgia State	Kidd Brewer Stadium; Boone, NC	ASN	W 17–3	24,782
October 12	8:00 p.m.	at Louisiana–Lafayette	Cajun Field; Lafayette, LA	ESPN2	W 24–0	16,960
October 22	3:30 p.m.	Idaho	Kidd Brewer Stadium; Boone, NC	ESPN3	W 37–19	26,931
October 27	7:30 p.m.	at Georgia Southern	Paulson Stadium; Statesboro, GA (rivalry)	ESPNU	W 34–10	23,474
November 5	3:30 p.m.	Texas State	Kidd Brewer Stadium; Boone, NC	ESPN3	W 35–10	28,472
November 12	3:30 p.m.	at Troy	Veterans Memorial Stadium; Troy, AL	ESPN3	L 24–28	25,782
November 19	2:30 p.m.	Louisiana–Monroe	Kidd Brewer Stadium; Boone, NC	ESPN3	W 42–17	18,699
November 26	4:00 p.m.	at New Mexico State	Aggie Memorial Stadium; Las Cruces, NM	ESPN3	W 37–7	5,366
December 17	5:30 p.m.	vs. Toledo*	Cramton Bowl; Montgomery, AL (Camellia Bowl)	ESPN	W 31–28	20,257
*Non-conference game; Rankings from AP Poll released prior to game; All times are in Eastern time

Schedule source:

== Game summaries ==
=== At Tennessee ===
	1	2	3	4	OT	Total
Mountaineers	7	6	0	0	0	13
#9 Volunteers	3	0	3	7	7	20

=== Old Dominion ===
	1	2	3	4	Total
Monarchs	0	7	0	0	7
Mountaineers	14	10	0	7	31

=== Miami (FL) ===
	1	2	3	4	Total
#25 Hurricanes	21	3	7	14	45
Mountaineers	0	3	7	0	10

=== At Akron ===
	1	2	3	4	Total
Mountaineers	10	21	7	7	45
Zips	0	14	10	14	38

=== Georgia State ===
	1	2	3	4	Total
Panthers	0	0	0	3	3
Mountaineers	0	0	7	10	17

=== At Louisiana–Lafayette ===
	1	2	3	4	Total
Mountaineers	10	14	0	0	24
Ragin' Cajuns	0	0	0	0	0

=== Idaho ===
	1	2	3	4	Total
Vandals	0	6	3	10	19
Mountaineers	10	0	13	14	37

=== At Georgia Southern ===
	1	2	3	4	Total
Mountaineers	0	10	10	14	34
Eagles	10	0	0	0	10

=== Texas State ===
	1	2	3	4	Total
Bobcats	3	0	7	0	10
Mountaineers	7	21	7	0	35

=== At Troy ===
	1	2	3	4	Total
Mountaineers	0	14	3	7	24
Trojans	14	0	7	7	28

=== Louisiana–Monroe ===
	1	2	3	4	Total
Warhawks	3	7	0	7	17
Mountaineers	14	7	14	7	42

=== At New Mexico State ===
	1	2	3	4	Total
Mountaineers	17	3	10	7	37
Aggies	0	7	0	0	7

=== Toledo–Camellia Bowl ===
	1	2	3	4	Total
Mountaineers	7	7	14	3	31
Rockets	7	7	14	0	28

== Roster ==
2016 Appalachian State Mountaineers football team roster
Players
Coaches
Offense

Pos.	#	Name	Class
WR	2	Ike Lewis	Jr
QB	2	Zeb Speir	Fr
WR	3	Deltron Hopkins	So
WR	6	Shaedon Meadors	Jr
QB	7	Jacob Huesman	Fr
RB	8	Josh Boyd	So
QB	10	J.P. Caruso	So
QB	11	Taylor Lamb	Jr
QB	12	Zac Thomas	Fr
WR	13	Dante Jones	Jr
RB	14	Marcus Cox	Sr
WR	15	Mock Adams	Fr
WR	16	Jaquil Capel	Sr
QB	16	Jake Easter	Fr
QB	17	Curtis Fitch	So
WR	18	Brad Absher	So
RB	19	Darrynton Evans	Fr
RB	21	Terrence Upshaw	Jr
RB	25	Jalin Moore	So
RB	27	Marcus Williams Jr.	Fr
TE	30	George Vinson	Jr
TE	46	Bill Cecil	Jr
OL	50	Beau Nunn	Jr
OL	52	Tobias Edge-Campbell	So
OL	55	Matt Williams	Fr
OL	56	Nate Haskins	Fr
OL	58	Ryan Neuzil	Fr
OL	60	Logan Wright	Fr
OL	61	Aidan Nesvisky	Fr
OL	63	Ivan Reyes	Fr
OL	64	Jake Appling	Fr
OL	66	Jamie Collmar	Sr
OL	67	Weston Gillespie	Fr
OL	70	Colby Gossett	Jr
OL	73	Cole Garrison	Fr
OL	74	Victor Johnson	Fr
OL	75	Parker Collins	Sr
OL	76	Madison Malone	So
OL	78	Chandler Greer	So
OL	79	Will Hardin	Fr
TE	80	Hunter Nunn	Jr
WR	81	Jalen Virgil	Fr
WR	82	Zy Letman	Jr
WR	83	Mykel Golden	Sr
WR	84	Crisjohn Roscoe	Fr
TE	85	Barrett Burns	Sr
TE	86	Levi Duffield	Jr
TE	87	Collin Reed	Fr
WR	88	T.J. Watkins	Fr
TE	89	Mitchell McClurg	Fr

Defense

Pos.	#	Name	Class
DB	3	Alex Gray	Sr
DB	4	Mondo Williams	Sr
LB	6	Kennan Gilchrist	Sr
DB	7	Josh Thomas	So
DB	9	Austin Exford	So
DB	10	A. J. Howard	Jr
DB	11	Jeremy Level	Fr
DB	12	Brandon Pinckney	Jr
DB	17	Tae Hayes	So
DB	18	Shemar Jean-Charles	Fr
LB	20	Cameron Pack	Fr
DB	20	A'Darius Purifoy	Fr
DB	22	Clifton Duck	Fr
LB	24	Akeem Davis-Gaither	Fr
DB	26	K.J. Chamberlain	Fr
LB	28	Devan Stringer	Jr
DB	29	Devonte Harrison	Fr
LB	31	Rashaad Townes	Jr
LB	33	Edward Davis	Fr
DB	34	Desmond Franklin	Fr
LB	35	Toronto Thomas	Sr
DB	36	Kaiden Smith	Fr
LB	37	Teh'ron Fuller	So
LB	39	Miller Kirkpatrick	Fr
DL	40	Nate Norwood	Sr
DL	42	Tee Sims	Sr
LB	44	Anthony Flory	So
LB	45	Eric Boggs	Jr
DL	47	Okon Godwin	So
LB	48	Dezmin Reed	Sr
DL	51	Caleb Fuller	Jr
LB	53	Noel Cook	Fr
DL	54	Darian Small	Sr
LB	59	Jordan Fehr	Fr
DL	68	Brody Barrett	Fr
DL	69	Tommy Dawkins	Fr
DL	72	Tyson Fernandez	Sr
LB	88	John Law	Sr
DL	90	Chris Willis	Fr
DL	91	Caleb Spurlin	Fr
DL	92	MyQuon Stout	So
DL	95	Devin Papenheim	Fr
DL	96	Elijah Diarrassouba	Fr
DL	97	Matthew McClurg	Fr
DL	99	Baer Hunter	Fr

Special teams

Pos.	#	Name	Class
K	41	Michael Rubino	Fr
K	57	Chandler Staton	Fr
K/P	91	Bentlee Critcher	Sr
LS	93	Elias McMurray	So
K	94	Rylee Critcher	Fr

Head coach

- Scott Satterfield

Coordinators/assistant coaches

- Nate Woody (defensive coordinator/outside linebackers)
- Shawn Clark (co-offensive coordinator (run game)/offensive lineman)
- Frank Ponce (co-offensive coordinator (pass game)/quarterbacks)
- Bryan Brown (cornerbacks)
- Stu Holt (running backs/special teams)
- Mark Ivey (defensive line)
- Dale Jones (inside linebackers)
- Scot Sloan (secondary/recruiting coordinator)
- Justin Watts (wide receivers)
- Mike Sirignano (strength & conditioning)
- Alex Farah (graduate assistant – offense)

Legend

- (C) Team captain
- (S) Suspended
- (I) Ineligible
- Injured
- Redshirt

Roster
Last update: January 12, 2017
