= 2016 Texas State Bobcats football team =

American college football season

2016 Texas State Bobcats football
- Conference: Sun Belt Conference
- Record: 2–10 (0–8 Sun Belt)
- Head coach: Everett Withers (1st season)
- Offensive coordinator: Brett Elliott (1st season)
- Offensive scheme: Spread
- Defensive coordinator: Randall McCray (1st season)
- Base defense: Multiple
- Home stadium: Bobcat Stadium

2016 Sun Belt Conference football standings
	Conf.			Overall
Team	W		L	W		L
Appalachian State +	7	–	1	10	–	3
Arkansas State +	7	–	1	8	–	5
Troy	6	–	2	10	–	3
Idaho	6	–	2	9	–	4
Louisiana–Lafayette	5	–	3	6	–	7
Georgia Southern	4	–	4	5	–	7
Louisiana–Monroe	3	–	5	4	–	8
South Alabama	2	–	6	6	–	7
Georgia State	2	–	6	3	–	9
New Mexico State	2	–	6	3	–	9
Texas State	0	–	8	2	–	10
+ – Conference co-champions

The 2016 Texas State Bobcats football team represented Texas State University in the 2016 NCAA Division I FBS football season. The Bobcats played their home games at Bobcat Stadium in San Marcos, Texas and competed in the Sun Belt Conference. They were led by first-year head coach Everett Withers. The Bobcats were members of the Sun Belt Conference. They finished the season 2–10, 0–8 in Sun Belt play to finish in last place.

== Preseason ==
=== Sun Belt coaches poll ===
The Sun Belt coaches preseason prediction poll was released on July 21, 2016. The Bobcats were predicted to finish tenth in the conference.

Sun Belt coaches poll
Predicted finish	Team	Votes (1st place)
1	Appalachian State	114 (5)
2	Arkansas State	110 (5)
3	Georgia Southern	98 (1)
4	Georgia State	73
5	Louisiana–Lafayette	70
5	Troy	70
7	South Alabama	62
8	Idaho	48
9	New Mexico State	37
10	Texas State	30
11	Louisiana–Monroe	14

== Schedule ==
Texas State announced its 2016 football schedule on March 3, 2016. The 2016 schedule consists of six home and away games in the regular season. The Bobcats will host Sun Belt foes Arkansas State, Idaho, Louisiana–Lafayette, and Troy, and will travel to Appalachian State, Georgia State, Louisiana–Monroe, and New Mexico State. Texas State will skip out on two Sun Belt teams this season, Georgia Southern and South Alabama.

The team will play four non–conference games, two home games against Houston from the American Athletic Conference (ACC) and Incarnate Word from the Southland Conference, and two road games against Arkansas from the Southeastern Conference (SEC) and Ohio from the Mid-American Conference (MAC).

Date	Time	Opponent	Site	TV	Result	Attendance
September 3	2:30 pm	at Ohio*	Peden Stadium; Athens, OH	CBSSN	W 56–54 ^{3OT}	23,093
September 17	6:30 pm	at No. 24 Arkansas*	Donald W. Reynolds Razorback Stadium; Fayetteville, AR	SECN	L 3–42	72,114
September 24	6:00 pm	No. 6 Houston*	Bobcat Stadium; San Marcos, TX	ESPNU	L 3–64	33,133
October 1	6:00 pm	Incarnate Word*	Bobcat Stadium; San Marcos, TX	KEYE	W 48–17	22,845
October 8	2:30 pm	at Georgia State	Georgia Dome; Atlanta, GA	ESPN3	L 21–41	13,179
October 15	6:00 pm	at Louisiana–Monroe	Malone Stadium; Monroe, LA	ESPN3	L 34–40	12,735
October 22	6:00 pm	Louisiana–Lafayette^{†}	Bobcat Stadium; San Marcos, TX	SPEC	L 3–27	18,278
November 5	2:30 pm	at Appalachian State	Kidd Brewer Stadium; Boone, NC	ESPN3	L 10–35	28,472
November 12	3:00 pm	Idaho	Bobcat Stadium; San Marcos, TX	SPEC	L 14–47	15,314
November 19	3:30 pm (Note: Delayed from original 3:00 p.m. start time due to crash of Texas State's team bus.)	at New Mexico State	Aggie Memorial Stadium; Las Cruces, NM	SPEC	L 10–50	6,280
November 26	3:00 pm	Troy	Bobcat Stadium; San Marcos, TX	SPEC	L 7–40	8,010
December 3	6:30 pm	Arkansas State	Bobcat Stadium; San Marcos, TX	ESPN2	L 14–36	11,137
*Non-conference game; ^{†}Homecoming; Rankings from AP Poll released prior to the game; All times are in Central time

== Game summaries ==
=== At Ohio ===
	1	2	3	4	OT	2OT	3OT	Total
TXST Bobcats	0	14	7	17	3	7	8	56
Ohio Bobcats	6	0	10	22	3	7	6	54

=== At Arkansas ===
	1	2	3	4	Total
Bobcats	0	0	3	0	3
#24 Razorbacks	14	21	7	0	42

=== Houston ===
	1	2	3	4	Total
#6 Cougars	16	27	14	7	64
Bobcats	0	3	0	0	3

=== Incarnate Word ===
	1	2	3	4	Total
Cardinals	7	3	0	7	17
Bobcats	0	21	13	14	48

=== At Georgia State ===
	1	2	3	4	Total
Bobcats	14	0	7	0	21
Panthers	0	24	17	0	41

=== At Louisiana–Monroe ===
	1	2	3	4	Total
Bobcats	14	0	7	13	34
Warhawks	10	23	7	0	40

=== Louisiana–Lafayette ===
	1	2	3	4	Total
Ragin' Cajuns	3	10	7	7	27
Bobcats	3	0	0	0	3

=== At Appalachian State ===
	1	2	3	4	Total
Bobcats	3	0	7	0	10
Mountaineers	7	21	7	0	35

=== Idaho ===
	1	2	3	4	Total
Vandals	14	17	9	7	47
Bobcats	14	0	0	0	14

=== At New Mexico State ===
	1	2	3	4	Total
Bobcats	0	0	3	7	10
Aggies	28	10	3	9	50

=== Troy ===
	1	2	3	4	Total
Trojans	14	16	7	3	40
Bobcats	0	0	7	0	7

=== Arkansas State ===
	1	2	3	4	Total
Red Wolves	6	7	3	20	36
Bobcats	0	7	7	0	14

== Coaching staff ==
On January 6, 2016, Everett Withers accepted the position of head coach at Texas State University. On July 18, 2016, Withers completed his staff for the 2016 season.

Name	Position	Year	Former Texas State positions held	Alma mater
Everett Withers	Head coach	2016		Appalachian State 1985
Brett Elliott	Offensive coordinator/quarterbacks	2016		Linfield 2005
Randall McCray	Assistant head coach/defensive Coordinator/Inside Linebackers	2016		Appalachian State 1991
Parker Fleming	Wide receivers/special teams Coordinator	2016		Presbyterian 2010
Adrian Mayes	Offensive line/Recruiting Coordinator	2016		Kansas 2008
Ron Antoine	Running backs and Tight Ends	2016		Colorado State 1997
Jules Montinar	Cornerbacks	2016		Eastern Kentucky 2009
Troy Douglas	Safeties	2016		Appalachian State 1988
Tyler Santucci	Outside linebackers	2016		Stony Brook 2010
Antoine Smith	Defensive line	2016		Maine 2001
John Streicher	Director of football operations	2016		Ohio State 2012
Michael George	Director of player personnel	2016		Washington University in St. Louis 2005
Jeremy Smith	Director of Player Development	2015	Football Operations Intern 2014	Houston 2011
