= 2016 South Alabama Jaguars football team =

American college football season

2016 South Alabama Jaguars football

Arizona Bowl, L 21–45 vs. Air Force
- Conference: Sun Belt Conference
- Record: 6–7 (2–6 Sun Belt)
- Head coach: Joey Jones (8th season)
- Offensive coordinator: Bryant Vincent (2nd season)
- Offensive scheme: Spread
- Defensive coordinator: Kane Wommack (1st season)
- Base defense: 4–2–5
- Home stadium: Ladd–Peebles Stadium

2016 Sun Belt Conference football standings
	Conf.			Overall
Team	W		L	W		L
Appalachian State +	7	–	1	10	–	3
Arkansas State +	7	–	1	8	–	5
Troy	6	–	2	10	–	3
Idaho	6	–	2	9	–	4
Louisiana–Lafayette	5	–	3	6	–	7
Georgia Southern	4	–	4	5	–	7
Louisiana–Monroe	3	–	5	4	–	8
South Alabama	2	–	6	6	–	7
Georgia State	2	–	6	3	–	9
New Mexico State	2	–	6	3	–	9
Texas State	0	–	8	2	–	10
+ – Conference co-champions

The 2016 South Alabama Jaguars football team represented the University of South Alabama in the 2016 NCAA Division I FBS football season. The Jaguars played their home games at Ladd–Peebles Stadium in Mobile, Alabama, and competed in the Sun Belt Conference. They were led by head coach Joey Jones, who was in his eighth year with the team. They finished the season 6–7, 2–6 in Sun Belt play to finish in a three-way tie for eighth place. They were invited to the Arizona Bowl where they lost to Air Force.

== Schedule ==
South Alabama announced its 2016 football schedule on March 3, 2016. The 2016 schedule consists of 6 home and away games in the regular season. The Jaguars will host Sun Belt foes Georgia Southern, Georgia State, New Mexico State, and Troy, and will travel to Arkansas State, Idaho, Louisiana–Lafayette, and Louisiana–Monroe. South Alabama will skip out on two Sun Belt teams this season, Appalachian State and Texas State.

The team will play four non–conference games, two home games against Nicholls State from the Southland Conference and San Diego State from the Mountain West Conference, and two road games against Louisiana State (LSU) and Mississippi State both from the Southeastern Conference (SEC). On October 13, 2016, LSU canceled its game against the Jaguars on November 19 due to scheduling issues after Hurricane Matthew. On October 15, 2016, the Jaguars announced they will host the Presbyterian Blue Hose on November 19; the Blue Hose's game with Florida on that day was also canceled under the same circumstances.

Date	Time	Opponent	Site	TV	Result	Attendance
September 3	11:00 a.m.	at Mississippi State*	Davis Wade Stadium; Starkville, MS	SECN	W 21–20	57,075
September 10	6:00 p.m.	Georgia Southern	Ladd–Peebles Stadium; Mobile, AL	ASN	L 9–24	17,691
September 17	6:00 p.m.	at Louisiana–Lafayette	Cajun Field; Lafayette, LA	ESPN3	L 23–28	19,208
September 24	6:00 p.m.	Nicholls State*	Ladd–Peebles Stadium; Mobile, AL	ESPN3	W 41–40 ^{OT}	13,086
October 1	7:00 p.m.	No. 19 San Diego State*	Ladd–Peebles Stadium; Mobile, AL	ESPNews	W 42–24	14,741
October 15	6:00 p.m.	at Arkansas State	Centennial Bank Stadium; Jonesboro, AR	ESPN3	L 7–17	22,277
October 20	6:30 p.m.	Troy	Ladd–Peebles Stadium; Mobile, AL (Battle for the Belt)	ESPNU	L 21–28	30,837
October 29	4:00 p.m.	Georgia State	Ladd–Peebles Stadium; Mobile, AL	ESPN3	W 13–10	11,565
November 5	4:00 p.m.	at Louisiana–Monroe	Malone Stadium; Monroe, LA	ESPN3	L 35–42 ^{OT}	16,073
November 19	6:00 p.m.	Presbyterian*	Ladd–Peebles Stadium; Mobile, AL	ESPN3	W 31–7	11,017
November 26	2:30 p.m.	at Idaho	Kibbie Dome; Moscow, ID	ASN	L 31–38	9,049
December 3	12:00 p.m.	New Mexico State	Ladd–Peebles Stadium; Mobile, AL	ESPN3	W 35–28	14,812
December 30	3:30 pm	vs. Air Force*	Arizona Stadium; Tucson, AZ (Arizona Bowl)	ASN	L 21–45	33,868
*Non-conference game; Rankings from AP Poll released prior to the game; All times are in Central time

== Game summaries ==
=== At Mississippi State ===
	1	2	3	4	Total
Jaguars	0	0	7	14	21
Bulldogs	7	10	3	0	20

=== Georgia Southern ===
	1	2	3	4	Total
Eagles	10	0	7	7	24
Jaguars	3	3	0	3	9

=== At Louisiana–Lafayette ===
	1	2	3	4	Total
Jaguars	0	7	7	9	23
Ragin' Cajuns	6	3	13	6	28

=== Nicholls State ===
	1	2	3	4	OT	Total
Colonels	0	23	3	8	6	40
Jaguars	7	17	3	7	7	41

=== San Diego State ===
	1	2	3	4	Total
#19 Aztecs	6	10	8	0	24
Jaguars	14	0	7	21	42

=== At Arkansas State ===
	1	2	3	4	Total
Jaguars	0	0	0	7	7
Red Wolves	0	14	3	0	17

=== Troy ===
	1	2	3	4	Total
Trojans	7	6	0	15	28
Jaguars	14	7	0	0	21

=== Georgia State ===
	1	2	3	4	Total
Panthers	3	0	7	0	10
Jaguars	0	3	0	10	13

=== At Louisiana–Monroe ===
	1	2	3	4	OT	Total
Jaguars	7	7	14	7	0	35
Warhawks	7	7	7	14	7	42

=== Presbyterian ===
	1	2	3	4	Total
Blue Hose	0	0	7	0	7
Jaguars	7	14	0	20	41

=== At Idaho ===
	1	2	3	4	Total
Jaguars	7	14	7	3	31
Vandals	14	10	7	7	38

=== New Mexico State ===
	1	2	3	4	Total
Aggies	0	7	7	14	28
Jaguars	7	0	7	21	35

=== Vs. Air Force–Arizona Bowl ===
	1	2	3	4	Total
Jaguars	14	7	0	0	21
Falcons	3	18	17	7	45
