= 2016 Troy Trojans football team =

American college football season

2016 Troy Trojans football

Dollar General Bowl champion

Dollar General Bowl, W 28–23 vs. Ohio
- Conference: Sun Belt Conference
- Record: 10–3 (6–2 Sun Belt)
- Head coach: Neal Brown (2nd season)
- Co-offensive coordinators: Kenny Edenfield (7th season); Matt Moore (2nd season)
- Offensive scheme: Spread
- Defensive coordinator: Vic Koenning (4th season)
- Base defense: 3–3–5
- Home stadium: Veterans Memorial Stadium

2016 Sun Belt Conference football standings
	Conf.			Overall
Team	W		L	W		L
Appalachian State +	7	–	1	10	–	3
Arkansas State +	7	–	1	8	–	5
Troy	6	–	2	10	–	3
Idaho	6	–	2	9	–	4
Louisiana–Lafayette	5	–	3	6	–	7
Georgia Southern	4	–	4	5	–	7
Louisiana–Monroe	3	–	5	4	–	8
South Alabama	2	–	6	6	–	7
Georgia State	2	–	6	3	–	9
New Mexico State	2	–	6	3	–	9
Texas State	0	–	8	2	–	10
+ – Conference co-champions

The 2016 Troy Trojans football team represented Troy University in the 2016 NCAA Division I FBS football season. They were led by second-year head coach Neal Brown and played their home games at Veterans Memorial Stadium in Troy, Alabama. The Trojans were members of the Sun Belt Conference. They finished the season 10–3, 6–2 in Sun Belt play to finish in a two-way tie for third place. They were invited to the Dollar General Bowl where they defeated Ohio. This was the first 10-win season ever for Troy since joining the FBS in 2001. It was also the first season that Troy had received a Top 25 ranking since joining the FBS in 2001.

== Schedule ==
Troy announced their 2016 football schedule on March 3, 2016. The 2016 schedule consist of six home and seven away games in the regular season. The Trojans will host Sun Belt foes Appalachian State, Arkansas State, Georgia State, and New Mexico State, and will travel to Georgia Southern, Idaho, South Alabama, and Texas State.

Date	Time	Opponent	Rank	Site	TV	Result	Attendance
September 3	5:00 pm	Austin Peay*		Veterans Memorial Stadium; Troy, AL	ESPN3	W 57–17	18,885
September 10	11:30 am	at No. 2 Clemson*		Memorial Stadium; Clemson, SC	ACCN	L 24–30	78,532
September 17	6:00 pm	at Southern Miss*		M. M. Roberts Stadium; Hattiesburg, MS	beIN	W 37–31	27,905
September 24	6:00 pm	New Mexico State		Veterans Memorial Stadium; Troy, AL	ESPN3	W 52–6	21,146
October 1	4:00 pm	at Idaho		Kibbie Dome; Moscow, ID	ESPN3	W 34–13	13,392
October 15	2:30 pm	Georgia State		Veterans Memorial Stadium; Troy, AL	ESPN3	W 31–21	23,913
October 20	6:30 pm	at South Alabama		Ladd–Peebles Stadium; Mobile, AL (rivalry)	ESPNU	W 28–21	30,837
November 5	2:30 pm	UMass*		Veterans Memorial Stadium; Troy, AL	ESPN3	W 52–31	21,763
November 12	2:30 pm	Appalachian State		Veterans Memorial Stadium; Troy, AL	ESPN3	W 28–24	25,782
November 17	8:30 pm	Arkansas State	No. 25	Veterans Memorial Stadium; Troy, AL	ESPNU	L 3–35	23,764
November 26	3:00 pm	at Texas State		Bobcat Stadium; San Marcos, TX	ESPN3	W 40–7	8,010
December 3	11:00 am	at Georgia Southern		Paulson Stadium; Statesboro, GA	ESPN2	L 24–28	16,850
December 23	8:00 pm	vs. Ohio*		Ladd–Peebles Stadium; Mobile, AL (Dollar General Bowl)	ESPN	W 28–23	32,377
*Non-conference game; Rankings from AP Poll released prior to the game; All times are in Central time

== Rankings ==
Ranking movements Legend: ██ Increase in ranking ██ Decrease in ranking — = Not ranked RV = Received votes
	Week															
Poll	Pre	1	2	3	4	5	6	7	8	9	10	11	12	13	14	Final
AP	—	—	—	—	—	—	—	RV	RV	RV	RV	25	RV	RV	—	—
Coaches	—	—	—	—	RV	RV	RV	RV	RV	RV	RV	RV	—	RV	—	RV
CFP	Not released									—	—	—	—	—	—	Not released

== Game summaries ==
=== Austin Peay ===
	1	2	3	4	Total
Governors	7	7	3	0	17
Trojans	13	17	14	13	57

=== At Clemson ===
	1	2	3	4	Total
Trojans	3	7	0	14	24
#2 Tigers	3	10	0	17	30

=== At Southern Miss ===
	1	2	3	4	Total
Trojans	17	7	10	3	37
Golden Eagles	7	10	14	0	31

=== New Mexico State ===
	1	2	3	4	Total
Aggies	0	0	6	0	6
Trojans	7	24	14	7	52

=== At Idaho ===
	1	2	3	4	Total
Trojans	14	7	13	0	34
Vandals	6	0	0	7	13

=== Georgia State ===
	1	2	3	4	Total
Panthers	0	0	14	7	21
Trojans	3	3	11	14	31

=== At South Alabama ===
	1	2	3	4	Total
Trojans	7	6	0	15	28
Jaguars	14	7	0	0	21

=== Massachusetts ===
	1	2	3	4	Total
Minutemen	14	3	7	7	31
Trojans	21	7	10	14	52

=== Appalachian State ===
	1	2	3	4	Total
Mountaineers	0	14	3	7	24
Trojans	14	0	7	7	28

=== Arkansas State ===
	1	2	3	4	Total
Red Wolves	0	7	21	7	35
#25 Trojans	3	0	0	0	3

=== At Texas State ===
	1	2	3	4	Total
Trojans	14	16	7	3	40
Bobcats	0	0	7	0	7

=== At Georgia Southern ===
	1	2	3	4	Total
Trojans	3	7	7	7	24
Eagles	0	7	14	7	28

=== Vs. Ohio–Dollar General Bowl ===
	1	2	3	4	Total
Bobcats	7	10	3	3	23
Trojans	14	7	7	0	28
