= 2016 Georgia State Panthers football team =

American college football season

2016 Georgia State Panthers football
- Conference: Sun Belt Conference
- Record: 3–9 (2–6 Sun Belt)
- Head coach: Trent Miles (4th season; first 10 games); Tim Lappano (interim, final 2 games)
- Offensive coordinator: Luke Huard (1st season)
- Offensive scheme: Multiple
- Defensive coordinator: Jesse Minter (4th season)
- Base defense: 4–3
- Home stadium: Georgia Dome

2016 Sun Belt Conference football standings
	Conf.			Overall
Team	W		L	W		L
Appalachian State +	7	–	1	10	–	3
Arkansas State +	7	–	1	8	–	5
Troy	6	–	2	10	–	3
Idaho	6	–	2	9	–	4
Louisiana–Lafayette	5	–	3	6	–	7
Georgia Southern	4	–	4	5	–	7
Louisiana–Monroe	3	–	5	4	–	8
South Alabama	2	–	6	6	–	7
Georgia State	2	–	6	3	–	9
New Mexico State	2	–	6	3	–	9
Texas State	0	–	8	2	–	10
+ – Conference co-champions

The 2016 Georgia State Panthers football team represented Georgia State University (GSU) in the 2016 NCAA Division I FBS football season. The Panthers were led by fourth-year head coach Trent Miles for the first 10 games of the year until he was fired on November 12, 2016 after a 2–8 record. They were led by interim head coach Tim Lappano for the remainder of the season. They played their home games at the Georgia Dome. The 2016 season was the Panthers' fourth in the Sun Belt Conference and seventh since starting football. This was also the Panthers final season in the Georgia Dome, as the stadium was demolished on November 20, 2017 following the opening of Mercedes-Benz Stadium on August 26 of the same year.

== Schedule ==
Georgia State announced its 2016 football schedule on March 3, 2016. The 2016 schedule consists of 6 home and away games in the regular season. The Panthers will host Sun Belt foes Arkansas State, Georgia Southern, Louisiana–Monroe, and Texas State, and will travel to Appalachian State, Idaho, South Alabama, and Troy. Georgia State will skip out on two Sun Belt teams this season, Louisiana–Lafayette and New Mexico State.

The team will play four non–conference games, two home games against Ball State from the Mid-American Conference (MAC) and Tennessee–Martin (UT–Martin) from the Ohio Valley Conference, and two road games against Air Force from the Mountain West Conference and Wisconsin from the Big Ten Conference.

Date	Time	Opponent	Site	TV	Result	Attendance
September 2	7:00 p.m.	Ball State*	Georgia Dome; Atlanta, GA	ASN	L 21–31	12,233
September 10	2:00 p.m.	at Air Force*	Falcon Stadium; Colorado Springs, CO	MWN	L 14–48	24,173
September 17	12:00 p.m.	at No. 9 Wisconsin*	Camp Randall Stadium; Madison, WI	BTN	L 17–23	79,883
October 1	12:00 p.m.	at Appalachian State	Kidd Brewer Stadium; Boone, NC	ASN	L 3–17	24,782
October 8	3:30 p.m.	Texas State	Georgia Dome; Atlanta, GA	ESPN3	W 41–21	13,179
October 15	3:30 p.m.	at Troy	Veterans Memorial Stadium; Troy, AL	ESPN3	L 21–31	23,913
October 22	3:30 p.m.	Tennessee–Martin*	Georgia Dome; Atlanta, GA	ESPN3	W 31–6	15,223
October 29	5:00 p.m.	at South Alabama	Ladd–Peebles Stadium; Mobile, AL	ESPN3	L 10–13	11,565
November 3	7:30 p.m.	Arkansas State	Georgia Dome; Atlanta, GA	ESPNU	L 16–31	13,363
November 12	2:00 p.m.	Louisiana–Monroe	Georgia Dome; Atlanta, GA	ESPN3	L 23–37	13,106
November 19	2:00 p.m.	Georgia Southern	Georgia Dome; Atlanta, GA (rivalry)	ESPN3	W 30–24	23,513
December 3	5:00 p.m.	at Idaho	Kibbie Dome; Moscow, ID	ESPN3	L 12–37	11,242
*Non-conference game; Rankings from AP Poll released prior to the game; All times are in Eastern time

- All ASN games werealso broadcast on ESPN3.

== Coaching and support staff ==
Name	Position	Consecutive season at Georgia State in current position
Trent Miles	Head coach	4th
Harold Etheridge	Associate head coach, offensive line	4th
Luke Huard	Offensive coordinator, quarterback	1st
Jesse Minter	Defensive coordinator	4th
Jeff Jagodzinski	Assistant coach	4th
Larry Knight	Assistant coach, outside linebackers	2nd
Tim Lappano	Assistant coach, wide receivers	3rd
Eric Lewis	Assistant coach, secondary, special teams coordinator	2nd
Rick Minter	Assistant coach, defensive line	1st
P.J. Volker	Assistant coach, linebackers / recruiting coordinator	4th
Ben McLane	Graduate assistant, offense	1st
Chris O'Leary	Graduate assistant, defense	1st
Reid Sanders	Graduate assistant, offense	1st
John McDonell	Senior offensive analyst	1st
Dusty Bennett	Director of football operations	2nd
Scott Holsopple	Head strength and conditioning coach	1st
Bob Murphy	Associate AD, sports medicine and nutrition	1st
Liam Smith	Director of player personnel	1st
Nicholas Vogt	Equipment manager	4th

=== Roster ===
2016 Georgia State Panthers Football
Quarterback: 7 Conner Manning – (redshirt) junior (6'1, 205); 10 Ruggiero DeLuca – (redshirt) sophomore (6'3, 218); 11 Aaron Winchester – (redshirt) freshman (6'2, 175); 12 Emiere Scaife – (redshirt) sophomore (6'2, 218); 16 Joshua Shim – freshman (6'0, 205); Running back: 1 Kendrick Dorn – (redshirt) junior (6'0, 205); 5 Tra Barnett – freshman (5'10, 170); 8 Taz Bateman – junior (5'8, 185); 17 Glenn Smith – junior (6'1, 185); 23 Darius Stubbs – freshman (5'10, 188); 24 Anthony Valverde – (redshirt) sophomore (5'10, 210); 25 Kyler Neal – (redshirt) junior (5'11, 218); 28 Demarcus Kirk – (redshirt) freshman (6'0, 190); 36 Khai Anderson – sophomore (5'10, 185); 43 Deandre Bowman – freshman (5'10, 175); 48 Maurice Lauchner – junior (5'9, 195); Wide receiver: 4 Jawan Nobles – freshman (6'3, 180); 6 Jonathan Ifedi – freshman (6'0, 195); 14 Devin Gentry – freshman (5'10, 180); 15 Todd Boyd – junior (5'11, 180); 18 Penny Hart – sophomore (5'8, 185); 19 Robert Davis – senior (6'3, 220); 80 Matlin Marshall – freshman (5'9, 188); 81 Marquan Greene – sophomore (5'10, 180); 82 Brett Sheehan – (redshirt) junior (6'2, 180); 83 Mattavius Scott – senior (6'2, 206); 85 Eric Elder – freshman (6'0, 177); 86 Bryson Duckworth – freshman (6'4, 212); Tight end: 45 Keith Rucker – senior (6'3, 235); 46 Jacob Nesmith – (redshirt) junior (6'2, 270); 84 Bill Teknipp – (redshirt) junior (6'4, 235); 88 Ari Werts – sophomore (6'4, 225); Placekicker: 94 Barry Brown – freshman (6'4, 175); 96 Shavi Bash – junior (6'3, 185)	Offensive lineman: 51 Malik Besseck – OL – freshman (6'4, 275); 56 Alex Stoehr – OL – junior (6'2, 300); 57 Zeke Pernell – OL – freshman (6'5, 265); 61 Mitch Word – OL – (redshirt) senior (6'4, 300); 63 Davis Moore – OL – (redshirt) junior (6'4, 300); 64 Akil Hawkins – OL – (redshirt) senior (6'2, 282); 65 Shamarious Gilmore – OL – freshman (6'3, 275); 69 Lucas Johnson – OL – sophomore (6'4, 285); 72 Gabe Mobley – OL – (redshirt) sophomore (6'2, 275); 73 Nick Meyer – OL – freshman (6'5, 270); 74 Sebastian Willer – OT – (redshirt) junior (6'5, 279); 75 Michael Ivory – OT – (redshirt) senior (6'5, 340); 76 Hunter Atkinson – OT – (redshirt) freshman (6'5, 250); 77 Tyler Simonsen – OL – (redshirt) senior (6'3, 305); 78 Madison Bell – OL – (redshirt) junior (6'3, 280); 78 Dom Roldan – OL – (redshirt) senior (6'6, 350); Defensive lineman: 5 Mackendy Cheridor – DE – (redshirt) junior (6'5, 250); 30 Javonte Lain – DE – freshman (6'2, 220); 50 Jamal Paxton – DL – (redshirt) junior (6'0, 270); 52 Tevin Jones – DE – senior (6'4, 270); 53 Terry Thomas – DL – freshman (6'3, 255); 55 Carnell Hopson – DE – senior (6'2, 268); 58 Juan Orozco – DL – (redshirt) junior (6'0, 290); 62 Will Cunningham – DL – (redshirt) junior (6'1, 280); 90 Nich Long – DL – (redshirt) sophomore (6'5, 294); 91 Julien Laurent – DL – (redshirt) junior (6'4, 325); 92 DeQueszman Kelley – DL – (redshirt) junior (6'0, 285); 95 Marterious Allen – DE – sophomore (6'2, 240); 97 Jalen Lawrence – NG – senior (6'1, 285); 99 Clifford Amazan – DL – freshman (6'2, 315); Punter: 93 Brandon Wright – (redshirt) freshman (5'10, 160); 98 Jeff Hollingsworth – freshman (5'7, 170)	Linebacker: 3 Ed Curney – sophomore (5'11, 220); 4 Alonzo McGee – (redshirt) senior (6'1, 220); 11 Kaleb Ringer – (redshirt) senior (6'0, 235); 13 Charlie Patrick – freshman (6'0, 220); 27 Andrew Everett – (redshirt) senior (6'5, 240); 32 Malik Ricks – junior (6'1, 230); 33 James Traylor – junior (6'3, 220); 34 Niemus Bryant – (redshirt) sophomore (6'0, 220); 38 Jameel Spencer – senior (6'1, 230); 39 Chase Middleton – sophomore (6'2, 225); 42 Trey Payne – (redshirt) junior (6'0, 230); 44 Michael Shaw – (redshirt) sophomore (6'4, 222); 47 Payton Moore – freshman (6'2, 225); 57 Justin Otiwu – (redshirt) junior (6'1, 225); 69 Deshaun Faltz – (redshirt) junior (6'1, 212); Defensive back: 2 Bobby Baker – S – (redshirt) senior (6'2, 200); 7 Robert Dowling – CB – senior (5'10, 185); 9 Cedric Stone – CB – freshman (5'10, 175); 10 Chandon Sullivan – CB – junior (5'11, 185); 12 Deion Wilkins – DB – (redshirt) senior (5'9, 164); 14 Cloves Campbell – DB – senior (6'1, 205); 16 Jerome Smith – CB – (redshirt) sophomore (5'10, 165); 20 Bryan Williams – S – (redshirt) senior (6'3, 200); 21 Antreal Allen – CB – junior (5'11, 180); 22 Trey Chapman – DB – freshman (5'11, 180); 24 Kwon Williams – S – freshman (6'0, 202); 26 Anthony Davis – CB – (redshirt) sophomore (5'10, 175); 26 Kendrec Grady – S – freshman (6'2, 209); 28 David West – DB – (redshirt) freshman (6'1, 175); 29 B.J. Clay – CB – junior (6'0, 180); 30 Kyndall Phillips – DB – (redshirt) freshman (6'0, 185); 31 Ronald Peterkin – S – (redshirt) sophomore (6'0, 170); 35 Leander Howard – DB – (redshirt) freshman (5'10, 180); 37 Trent Hill – S – senior (5'10, 185); 40 Remy Lazarus – DB – (redshirt) freshman (6'0, 185); Long snappers: 54 Daniel Zeigler – (redshirt) junior (6'5, 240); 66 Seth-Patrick Holman – sophomore (5'11, 185)

== Game summaries ==
=== Ball State ===
	1	2	3	4	Total
Cardinals	7	7	3	14	31
Panthers	7	7	0	7	21

=== At Air Force ===
	1	2	3	4	Total
Panthers	7	7	0	0	14
Falcons	10	17	14	7	48

=== At Wisconsin ===
	1	2	3	4	Total
Panthers	0	0	10	7	17
No. 9 Badgers	6	0	7	10	23

=== At Appalachian State ===
	1	2	3	4	Total
Panthers	0	0	0	3	3
Mountaineers	0	0	7	10	17

=== Texas State ===
	1	2	3	4	Total
Bobcats	14	0	7	0	21
Panthers	0	24	17	0	41

=== At Troy ===
	1	2	3	4	Total
Panthers	0	0	14	7	21
Trojans	3	3	11	14	31

=== UT Martin ===
	1	2	3	4	Total
Skyhawks	0	3	0	3	6
Panthers	7	3	14	7	31

=== At South Alabama ===
	1	2	3	4	Total
Panthers	3	0	7	0	10
Jaguars	0	3	0	10	13

=== Arkansas State ===
	1	2	3	4	Total
Red Wolves	0	10	7	14	31
Panthers	0	3	7	6	16

=== Louisiana–Monroe ===
	1	2	3	4	Total
Warhawks	2	7	21	7	37
Panthers	0	7	13	3	23

=== Georgia Southern ===
	1	2	3	4	Total
Eagles	7	10	0	7	24
Panthers	20	0	10	0	30

=== At Idaho ===
	1	2	3	4	Total
Panthers	6	6	0	0	12
Vandals	14	10	10	3	37
