= 2016 New Mexico State Aggies football team =

American college football season

2016 New Mexico State Aggies football
- Conference: Sun Belt Conference
- Record: 3–9 (2–6 Sun Belt)
- Head coach: Doug Martin (4th season)
- Offensive scheme: Air raid
- Defensive coordinator: Frank Spaziani (1st season)
- Base defense: 3–3–5
- Home stadium: Aggie Memorial Stadium

2016 Sun Belt Conference football standings
	Conf.			Overall
Team	W		L	W		L
Appalachian State +	7	–	1	10	–	3
Arkansas State +	7	–	1	8	–	5
Troy	6	–	2	10	–	3
Idaho	6	–	2	9	–	4
Louisiana–Lafayette	5	–	3	6	–	7
Georgia Southern	4	–	4	5	–	7
Louisiana–Monroe	3	–	5	4	–	8
South Alabama	2	–	6	6	–	7
Georgia State	2	–	6	3	–	9
New Mexico State	2	–	6	3	–	9
Texas State	0	–	8	2	–	10
+ – Conference co-champions

The 2016 New Mexico State Aggies football team represented New Mexico State University as a member of the Sun Belt Conference during the 2016 NCAA Division I FBS football season. Led by fourth-year head coach Doug Martin, the Aggies compiled an overall record of 3–9 with a mark of 2–6 in conference play, placing in a three-way tie for eighth in the Sun Belt. New Mexico State played home games at Aggie Memorial Stadium in Las Cruces, New Mexico.

== Preseason ==
New Mexico State had a coaching shake up prior to the season, when Martin hired defensive coordinator Frank Spaziani, whom Martin served as offensive coordinator for at Boston College in 2012. Spaziani replaced Zane Vance who served as defensive coordinator and linebackers coach in 2015. Vance was retained and promoted to Assistant Head Coach, Defensive Ends coach and Special Teams Coordinator.

== Recruiting ==
=== Recruits ===
New Mexico State's recruiting class consisted of 23 recruits. New Mexico State's recruiting class was ranked 114th by Scout, 129th by 247Sports.com, not rated by Rivals and not rated by ESPN.

College recruiting information (2016)
Name	Hometown	School	Height	Weight	40^{‡}	Commit date
Josh Aganon; WR	Scottsdale, Arizona	Mesa Community College	5 ft 10 in (1.78 m)	180 lb (82 kg)	--	Dec 16, 2015
Josh Aganon; WR	Recruit ratings: Scout: Rivals: 247Sports: ESPN:					
Darius Anderson; DT	Fresno, Texas	Hightower H.S.	6 ft 0 in (1.83 m)	301 lb (137 kg)	--	Feb 3, 2016
Darius Anderson; DT	Recruit ratings: Scout: Rivals: 247Sports: ESPN:					
Drew Dan; WR	Muskogee, Oklahoma	Checotah H.S.	6 ft 2 in (1.88 m)	180 lb (82 kg)	--	Feb 3, 2016
Drew Dan; WR	Recruit ratings: Scout: Rivals: 247Sports: ESPN:					
Jefferson Hagen; OL	Moorpark, California	Moorpark College	6 ft 4 in (1.93 m)	290 lb (130 kg)	--	Apr 6, 2016
Jefferson Hagen; OL	Recruit ratings: Scout: Rivals: 247Sports: ESPN:					
Bobby Hill; DT	Long Beach, California	Orange Coast College	6 ft 2 in (1.88 m)	285 lb (129 kg)	--	Feb 3, 2016
Bobby Hill; DT	Recruit ratings: Scout: Rivals: 247Sports: ESPN:					
Jason Huntley; RB	Arlington, Texas	Martin H.S.	5 ft 9 in (1.75 m)	165 lb (75 kg)	--	Feb 3, 2016
Jason Huntley; RB	Recruit ratings: Scout: Rivals: 247Sports: ESPN:					
Cameron Matthews; QB	Fort Worth, Texas	Trinity Valley School	6 ft 3 in (1.91 m)	195 lb (88 kg)	--	Feb 3, 2016
Cameron Matthews; QB	Recruit ratings: Scout: Rivals: 247Sports: ESPN:					
Overall recruit ranking: Scout: 114 Rivals: NR 247Sports: 129 ESPN: NR
Note: In many cases, Scout, Rivals, 247Sports, On3, and ESPN may conflict in their listings of height and weight.; In these cases, the average was taken. ESPN grades are on a 100-point scale.; Sources: "ESPN". ESPN.; "2016 Team Ranking". Rivals.com.

== Schedule ==
New Mexico State Aggies announced its 2016 football schedule on March 3, 2016. The 2016 schedule consists of 5 home and 7 away games in the regular season. The Aggies will host Sun Belt foes Appalachian State, Georgia Southern, Louisiana–Lafayette, and Texas State, and will travel to Arkansas State, Idaho, South Alabama, and Troy. New Mexico State will skip out on two Sun Belt teams this season, Georgia State and Louisiana–Monroe.

The team will play four non–conference games, one home game against New Mexico from the Mountain West Conference, and will travel to three road games against UTEP from Conference USA (C–USA), and Kentucky and Texas A&M both from the Southeastern Conference (SEC).

Date	Time	Opponent	Site	TV	Result	Attendance
September 3	6:00 pm	at UTEP*	Sun Bowl; El Paso, TX (Battle of I-10)	beIN	L 22–38	30,119
September 10	6:00 pm	New Mexico*	Aggie Memorial Stadium; Las Cruces, NM (Rio Grande Rivalry)	AV, ESPN3	W 32–31	17,852
September 17	2:00 pm	at Kentucky*	Commonwealth Stadium; Lexington, KY	SECN	L 42–62	49,669
September 24	4:00 pm	at Troy	Veterans Memorial Stadium; Troy, AL	ESPN3	L 6–52	21,146
October 1	6:00 pm	Louisiana–Lafayette	Aggie Memorial Stadium; Las Cruces, NM	ESPN3	W 37–31 ^{2OT}	8,142
October 15	3:00 pm	at Idaho	Kibbie Dome; Moscow, ID	ALT2, ESPN3	L 23–55	10,278
October 22	6:00 pm	Georgia Southern	Aggie Memorial Stadium; Las Cruces, NM	AV, ESPN3	L 19–22	10,085
October 29	5:30 pm	at No. 9 Texas A&M*	Kyle Field; College Station, TX	ESPNU	L 10–52	99,960
November 12	1:00 pm	at Arkansas State	Centennial Bank Stadium; Jonesboro, AR	ESPN3	L 22–41	20,178
November 19	2:00 pm	Texas State	Aggie Memorial Stadium; Las Cruces, NM	AV, ESPN3	W 50–10	6,280
November 26	2:00 pm	Appalachian State	Aggie Memorial Stadium; Las Cruces, NM	AV, ESPN3	L 7–37	5,366
December 3	11:00 am	at South Alabama	Ladd–Peebles Stadium; Mobile, AL	ESPN3	L 28–35	14,812
*Non-conference game; Rankings from AP Poll released prior to the game; All times are in Mountain time

== Game summaries ==
=== At UTEP ===
	1	2	3	4	Total
Aggies	3	0	13	6	22
Miners	7	17	7	7	38

=== New Mexico ===
	1	2	3	4	Total
Lobos	14	3	7	7	31
Aggies	3	12	7	10	32

=== At Kentucky ===
	1	2	3	4	Total
Aggies	21	14	7	0	42
Wildcats	14	21	14	13	62

=== At Troy ===
	1	2	3	4	Total
Aggies	0	0	6	0	6
Trojans	7	24	14	7	52

=== Louisiana–Lafayette ===
	1	2	3	4	OT	2OT	Total
Ragin' Cajuns	7	6	8	3	7	0	31
Aggies	7	14	0	3	7	6	37

=== At Idaho ===
	1	2	3	4	Total
Aggies	13	3	0	7	23
Vandals	7	20	21	7	55

=== Georgia Southern ===
	1	2	3	4	Total
Eagles	3	3	3	13	22
Aggies	0	9	3	7	19

=== At Texas A&M ===
	1	2	3	4	Total
NMSU Aggies	0	3	0	7	10
#9 TXAM Aggies	14	10	21	7	52

=== At Arkansas State ===
	1	2	3	4	Total
Aggies	3	3	9	7	22
Red Wolves	13	14	14	0	41

=== Texas State ===
	1	2	3	4	Total
Bobcats	0	0	3	7	10
Aggies	28	10	3	9	50

=== Appalachian State ===
	1	2	3	4	Total
Mountaineers	17	3	10	7	37
Aggies	0	7	0	0	7

=== At South Alabama ===
	1	2	3	4	Total
Aggies	0	7	7	14	28
Jaguars	7	0	7	21	35

== Roster ==
2016 New Mexico State Aggies football team roster
Players
Coaches
Offense

Pos.	#	Name	Class
WR	1	Royce Caldwell	So
WR	2	O. J. Clark	Fr
RB	3	Larry Rose III	Jr
WR	4	Cassius Corley	So
WR	5	Tyrain Taylor	Sr
WR	6	Josh Aganon	Jr
WR	7	Gregory Hogan	Jr
RB	8	King Burke	Jr
QB	11	Conner Cramer	Jr
QB	12	Nick Jeanty	So
WR	13	Johnathan Boone	So
RB	14	Jason Huntley	Fr
WR	15	Drew Dan	Fr
WR	16	Jaleel Scott	Jr
QB	17	Tyler Rogers	Sr
RB	18	Robert Wiggins	Fr
WR	19	Isaiah McIntyre	Fr
RB	20	Brandyn Leonard	Fr
RB	22	Xavier Hall	Sr
QB	23	Dominic Johnson	Fr
RB	26	Gamar Girdy	Fr
RB	28	C. J. Boston	Fr
OL	50	Abram Holland	Sr
OL	51	Thomas McGwire	Jr
OL	54	Spence Ueli-Faatoalia	Jr
OL	55	Sebastian Anderson	Fr
OL	58	Dezmand Candielarie	Jr
OL	61	Jefferson Hagan	Jr
OL	62	Anthony McMeans	Sr
OL	65	Tony Bello	Fr
OL	67	Kolton Bob	Fr
OL	69	Tyler DuBry	Fr
OL	72	Brayton Medina	Jr
OL	74	Jamin Smith	Jr
OL	75	Noah Lopez	Fr
OL	76	Sage Doxtater	Fr
OL	78	Brian Trujillo	Fr
WR	80	Anthony Muse	Fr
WR	81	Rhyan Araiza	Fr
TE	82	Ty Atencio	Sr
WR	84	Cameron Loos	Fr
WR	86	Troy Posey	Jr
TE	88	Clayton Granch	Sr
TE	89	Jackson Solbeck	So

Defense

Pos.	#	Name	Class
DB	1	Jacob Nwangwa	Jr
DB	2	Terrill Hanks	So
LB	3	Derek Ibekwe	Jr
DB	4	DeMarcus Owens	So
DB	6	Christian Gibson	So
LB	7	Javahn Fergurson	So
DE	8	Jassavia Reese	So
DL	9	Stody Bradley	Jr
DL	10	Cedric Wilcots II	Fr
DB	11	Tre Wilcoxen	Jr
DB	12	Tymon Locklin	Fr
DB	13	Austin Shaw	Fr
DB	14	Dion Henrique	So
DE	15	Brett Kowalski	Fr
LB	17	Travis Parnell	Fr
DE	18	Derek Watson	Fr
DB	19	Austin Perkins	Fr
LB	20	Jonathan Hood	So
DB	21	Jaden Wright	Jr
DB	23	Jerrion Burton	Jr
DB	24	Sy Slater	Fr
DB	25	Samuel Oyenguga	Sr
LB	28	Shane Jackson	Fr
DB	29	Jared Phipps	Fr
DB	30	Brandon Bell	Fr
LB	31	Dalton Herrington	Jr
LB	32	Dalton Rocha	Jr
DE	34	Noah Brown	Sr
DB	35	Malik Demby	So
DB	36	Dallas Hart	Jr
LB	38	Chris Acosta	Jr
LB	40	Robert Wagner	Sr
LB	43	Billy Nipp	So
LB	44	Will Clement	So
DE	48	Kalei Auelua	Jr
DL	51	Roy Lopez	Fr
LB	53	Rodney Butler	Sr
DL	59	Brandon Agomuo	So
DL	63	DeShawnte Lloyd	Jr
DL	73	Keanu Higgins	Jr
DL	90	Kourtland Busby	Jr
DL	92	Humberto Renteria	So
DL	93	Drew James	Sr
DL	97	Bobby Hill	Jr
DL	98	Darius Anderson	Fr
DL	99	Myles Vigne	Fr

Special teams

Pos.	#	Name	Class
K	24	Parker Davidson	So
P	19	Payton Theisler	Fr
LS	46	Kennon Nunez	Fr
LS	47	Andrew Kenney	Sr
P	49	Max Wren	Jr

Head coach

- Doug Martin (offensive coordinator/quarterbacks)

Coordinators/assistant coaches

- Zane Vance (assistant head coach/defensive ends/special teams coordinator)
- Frank Spaziani (defensive coordinator)
- Kevin McKeethan (Inside Wide Receivers/Pass Game coordinator/recruiting coordinator)
- Andy Richman (offensive line coach/run game coordinator)
- Brian Bell (Secondary)
- Matt Christian (running backs)
- Kerry Locklin (defensive tackles)
- Cory Martin (outside wide receivers)
- Oliver Soukup (linebackers)
- Garrett Anderson (graduate assistant)
- Kai Brown (graduate assistant)
- Spiffy Evans (graduate assistant)
- Robert Patel (Video Coordinator)
- Ryan Robinson (Player Development Coordinator)
- Don Decker (Director of Sport Performance)
- Akeem Robinson (Sports Performance Coaching Assistant)
- Zach Witherspoon (Sports Performance Coaching Assistant)
- Martha Valdez (Administrative Assistant)

Legend

- (C) Team captain
- (S) Suspended
- (I) Ineligible
- Injured
- Redshirt

Roster
Last update: October 19, 2016
