= 2016 Arkansas State Red Wolves football team =

American college football season

2016 Arkansas State Red Wolves football

Sun Belt co-champion Cure Bowl champion

Cure Bowl, W 31–13 vs. UCF
- Conference: Sun Belt Conference
- Record: 8–5 (7–1 Sun Belt)
- Head coach: Blake Anderson (3rd season)
- Co-offensive coordinator: Buster Faulkner (1st season)
- Offensive scheme: Spread
- Defensive coordinator: Joe Cauthen (3rd season)
- Base defense: 4–2–5
- Home stadium: Centennial Bank Stadium

2016 Sun Belt Conference football standings
	Conf.			Overall
Team	W		L	W		L
Appalachian State +	7	–	1	10	–	3
Arkansas State +	7	–	1	8	–	5
Troy	6	–	2	10	–	3
Idaho	6	–	2	9	–	4
Louisiana–Lafayette	5	–	3	6	–	7
Georgia Southern	4	–	4	5	–	7
Louisiana–Monroe	3	–	5	4	–	8
South Alabama	2	–	6	6	–	7
Georgia State	2	–	6	3	–	9
New Mexico State	2	–	6	3	–	9
Texas State	0	–	8	2	–	10
+ – Conference co-champions

The 2016 Arkansas State Red Wolves football team represented Arkansas State Red Wolves in the 2016 NCAA Division I FBS football season. The Red Wolves played their home games at Centennial Bank Stadium in Jonesboro, Arkansas and competed in the Sun Belt Conference. They were led by third-year head coach Blake Anderson.

== Schedule ==
Arkansas State announced its 2016 football schedule on March 3, 2016. The 2016 schedule consists of 6 home and away games in the regular season. The Red Wolves will host Sun Belt foes Georgia Southern, Louisiana–Monroe, New Mexico State, and South Alabama, and will travel to Georgia State, Louisiana–Lafayette, Texas State, and Troy. Arkansas State will skip out on two Sun Belt teams this season, Appalachian State and Idaho.

The team will play four non–conference games, two home games against Central Arkansas from the Southland Conference and Toledo from the Mid-American Conference (MAC), and two road games against Auburn from the Southeastern Conference (SEC) and Utah State from the Mountain West Conference.

Date	Time	Opponent	Site	TV	Result	Attendance
September 2	8:00 p.m.	Toledo*	Centennial Bank Stadium; Jonesboro, AR	ESPNU	L 10–31	26,182
September 10	6:30 p.m.	at Auburn*	Jordan–Hare Stadium; Auburn, AL	SECN	L 14–51	86,825
September 17	8:00 p.m.	at Utah State*	Maverik Stadium; Logan, UT	CBSSN	L 20–34	21,091
September 24	6:00 p.m.	Central Arkansas*	Centennial Bank Stadium; Jonesboro, AR	ESPN3	L 23–28	28,012
October 5	7:00 p.m.	Georgia Southern	Centennial Bank Stadium; Jonesboro, AR	ESPN2	W 27–26	19,381
October 15	6:00 p.m.	South Alabama^{†}	Centennial Bank Stadium; Jonesboro, AR	ESPN3	W 17–7	22,277
October 29	6:00 p.m.	Louisiana–Monroe	Centennial Bank Stadium; Jonesboro, AR	ESPN3	W 51–10	20,170
November 3	6:30 p.m.	at Georgia State	Georgia Dome; Atlanta, GA	ESPNU	W 31–16	13,363
November 12	2:00 p.m.	New Mexico State	Centennial Bank Stadium; Jonesboro, AR	ESPN3	W 41–22	20,178
November 17	8:30 p.m.	at No. 25 Troy	Veterans Memorial Stadium; Troy, AL	ESPNU	W 35–3	23,764
November 26	11:00 a.m.	at Louisiana–Lafayette	Cajun Field; Lafayette, LA	ASN	L 19–24	14,259
December 3	3:00 p.m.	at Texas State	Bobcat Stadium; San Marcos, TX	ESPN2	W 36–14	11,137
December 17	5:00 p.m.	vs. UCF*	Camping World Stadium; Orlando, FL (Cure Bowl)	CBSSN	W 31–13	27,213
*Non-conference game; ^{†}Homecoming; Rankings from AP Poll released prior to game; All times are in Central time

Schedule source:

== Game summaries ==
=== Toledo ===
	1	2	3	4	Total
Rockets	0	21	10	0	31
Red Wolves	3	0	0	7	10

=== At Auburn ===
	1	2	3	4	Total
Red Wolves	7	0	7	0	14
Tigers	14	24	10	3	51

=== At Utah State ===
	1	2	3	4	Total
Red Wolves	0	0	14	6	20
Aggies	17	7	3	7	34

=== Central Arkansas ===
	1	2	3	4	Total
Bears	7	6	3	12	28
Red Wolves	16	0	7	0	23

=== Georgia Southern ===
	1	2	3	4	Total
Eagles	7	6	10	3	26
Red Wolves	0	10	7	10	27

=== South Alabama ===
	1	2	3	4	Total
Jaguars	0	0	0	7	7
Red Wolves	0	14	3	0	17

=== Louisiana–Monroe ===
	1	2	3	4	Total
WarHawks	0	3	7	0	10
Red Wolves	14	28	9	0	51

=== At Georgia State ===
	1	2	3	4	Total
Red Wolves	0	10	7	14	31
Panthers	0	3	7	6	16

=== New Mexico State ===
	1	2	3	4	Total
Aggies	3	3	9	7	22
Red Wolves	13	14	14	0	41

=== At #25 Troy ===
	1	2	3	4	Total
Red Wolves	0	7	21	7	35
#25 Trojans	3	0	0	0	3

=== At Louisiana–Lafayette ===
	1	2	3	4	Total
Red Wolves	7	0	3	9	19
Ragin' Cajuns	7	7	7	3	24

=== At Texas State ===
	1	2	3	4	Total
Red Wolves	6	7	3	20	36
Bobcats	0	7	7	0	14

=== UCF–Cure Bowl ===
	1	2	3	4	Total
Knights	0	10	3	0	13
Red Wolves	17	0	7	7	31
