= 2016 Sun Belt Conference football season =

- League: NCAA Division I Football Bowl Subdivision
- Sport: Football
- Duration: September 1, 2016 through January 2017
- Teams: 11
- Total attendance: 1,079,575
- TV partner(s): ESPN, CST

2017 NFL Draft
- Top draft pick: TE Gerald Everett, South Alabama
- Picked by: Los Angeles Rams, 44th overall

Regular season
- Season champions: Appalachian State & Arkansas State
- Runners-up: Troy & Idaho
- Season MVP: Ja’Von Rolland-Jones
- Top scorer: Austin Rehkow (120 points)

Football seasons
- 2015 2017

2016 Sun Belt Conference football standings
	Conf.			Overall
Team	W		L	W		L
Appalachian State +	7	–	1	10	–	3
Arkansas State +	7	–	1	8	–	5
Troy	6	–	2	10	–	3
Idaho	6	–	2	9	–	4
Louisiana–Lafayette	5	–	3	6	–	7
Georgia Southern	4	–	4	5	–	7
Louisiana–Monroe	3	–	5	4	–	8
South Alabama	2	–	6	6	–	7
Georgia State	2	–	6	3	–	9
New Mexico State	2	–	6	3	–	9
Texas State	0	–	8	2	–	10
+ – Conference co-champions

The 2016 Sun Belt Conference football season was the 16th season in which the Sun Belt Conference operated a football league, and was part of the 2016 NCAA Division I FBS football season. The season began on September 1 with Appalachian State facing Tennessee. This was the third season for the Sun Belt since realignment that took effect in 2014, which added the tenth and eleventh members — Idaho and New Mexico State. Both teams were previously independents before joining the conference. The Sun Belt Conference is a "Group of Five" conference under the College Football Playoff format along with the American Athletic Conference, Conference USA, the Mid-American Conference, and the Mountain West Conference.

In this season, the Sun Belt football conference included 11 members: Appalachian State, Arkansas State, Georgia Southern, Georgia State, Idaho, Louisiana–Lafayette, Louisiana–Monroe, New Mexico State, South Alabama, Texas State, and Troy. The conference championship was determined by win–loss record within the conference.

Arkansas State entered the season as defending Sun Belt champions, as they went undefeated in 2015 conference play. The Red Wolves went on to lose to Louisiana Tech in the New Orleans Bowl 28–47.

== Preseason ==
=== 2016 predictions ===
The 2016 preseason coaches predictions were released on July 21, 2016, with the vote conducted by the head football coaches of each conference school. Appalachian State was picked to win the conference for the first time in school history. After coming second in the conference last year which resulted a trip to the Camellia Bowl, the Mountaineers returned 22 starters on the field for the upcoming season. Arkansas State, which had won at least a share of the conference title in four of the previous five seasons and was returning 13 starters (6 on offense, 7 on defense), was tapped to finish second.

Below are the results of the coaches poll with total points received next to each school and first-place votes in parentheses.

1. Appalachian State – 114 (5)
2. Arkansas State – 110 (5)
3. Georgia Southern – 98 (1)
4. Georgia State – 73
5. Louisiana–Lafayette – 70
6. Troy – 70
7. South Alabama – 62
8. Idaho – 48
9. New Mexico State – 37
10. Texas State – 30
11. Louisiana–Monroe – 14

== Season ==
For the first time in the 16-year history of Sun Belt football, a team from the conference was ranked in the top 25 of the AP Poll. In Week 11, the Troy Trojans, with a record of 8–1, received the #25 spot in the AP Poll. The Trojans lost their next game, to Arkansas State, to drop back out of the rankings.

== Rankings ==
		Pre	Wk 1	Wk 2	Wk 3	Wk 4	Wk 5	Wk 6	Wk 7	Wk 8	Wk 9	Wk 10	Wk 11	Wk 12	Wk 13	Wk 14	Final
Appalachian State	AP	—	—	—	—	—	—	—	—	—	—	—	—	—	—	—	—
Appalachian State	C	RV	RV	RV	—	RV	RV	RV	RV	RV	RV	RV	—	—	RV	RV	—
Appalachian State	CFP	Not released									—	—	—	—	—	—	
Arkansas State	AP	—	—	—	—	—	—	—	—	—	—	—	—	—	—	—	—
Arkansas State	C	—	—	—	—	—	—	—	—	—	—	—	—	—	—	—	—
Arkansas State	CFP	Not released									—	—	—	—	—	—	
Georgia Southern	AP	—	—	—	—	—	—	—	—	—	—	—	—	—	—	—	—
Georgia Southern	C	—	—	RV	—	—	—	—	—	—	—	—	—	—	—	—	—
Georgia Southern	CFP	Not released									—	—	—	—	—	—	
Georgia State	AP	—	—	—	—	—	—	—	—	—	—	—	—	—	—	—	—
Georgia State	C	—	—	—	—	—	—	—	—	—	—	—	—	—	—	—	—
Georgia State	CFP	Not released									—	—	—	—	—	—	
Idaho	AP	—	—	—	—	—	—	—	—	—	—	—	—	—	—	—	—
Idaho	C	—	—	—	—	—	—	—	—	—	—	—	—	—	—	—	—
Idaho	CFP	Not released									—	—	—	—	—	—	
Louisiana–Lafayette	AP	—	—	—	—	—	—	—	—	—	—	—	—	—	—	—	—
Louisiana–Lafayette	C	—	—	—	—	—	—	—	—	—	—	—	—	—	—	—	—
Louisiana–Lafayette	CFP	Not released									—	—	—	—	—	—	
Louisiana–Monroe	AP	—	—	—	—	—	—	—	—	—	—	—	—	—	—	—	—
Louisiana–Monroe	C	—	—	—	—	—	—	—	—	—	—	—	—	—	—	—	—
Louisiana–Monroe	CFP	Not released									—	—	—	—	—	—	
New Mexico State	AP	—	—	—	—	—	—	—	—	—	—	—	—	—	—	—	—
New Mexico State	C	—	—	—	—	—	—	—	—	—	—	—	—	—	—	—	—
New Mexico State	CFP	Not released									—	—	—	—	—	—	
South Alabama	AP	—	—	—	—	—	—	—	—	—	—	—	—	—	—	—	—
South Alabama	C	—	RV	—	—	—	RV	RV	—	—	—	—	—	—	—	—	—
South Alabama	CFP	Not released									—	—	—	—	—	—	
Texas State	AP	—	—	—	—	—	—	—	—	—	—	—	—	—	—	—	—
Texas State	C	—	—	—	—	—	—	—	—	—	—	—	—	—	—	—	—
Texas State	CFP	Not released									—	—	—	—	—	—	
Troy	AP	—	—	—	—	—	—	—	RV	RV	RV	RV	25	RV	RV	—	—
Troy	C	—	—	—	—	RV	RV	RV	RV	RV	RV	RV	RV	—	RV	—	RV
Troy	CFP	Not released									—	—	—	—	—	—	

Legend
	Improvement in ranking
	Drop in ranking
	Not ranked previous week
	No change in ranking from previous week
RV	Received votes but were not ranked in Top 25 of poll
т	Tied with team above or below also with this symbol

== Sun Belt vs other Conferences ==
=== Sun Belt vs Power Conference matchups ===
This is a list of the power conference teams (ACC, Big Ten, Big 12, Pac-12, SEC) Sun Belt played in non-conference play. (Rankings from the AP Poll):

Date	Visitor	Home	Site	Score
September 1	Appalachian State	#9 Tennessee (SEC)	Neyland Stadium • Knoxville, Tennessee	L 13–20 ^{OT}
September 3	South Alabama	Mississippi State (SEC)	Davis Wade Stadium • Starkville, Mississippi	W 21–20
September 10	Arkansas State	Auburn (SEC)	Jordan–Hare Stadium • Auburn, Alabama	L 14–51
September 10	Idaho	#8 Washington (Pac-12)	Husky Stadium • Seattle	L 14–59
September 10	Troy	#2 Clemson (ACC)	Memorial Stadium • Clemson, South Carolina	L 24–30
September 10	Louisiana–Monroe	#14 Oklahoma (Big 12)	Gaylord Family Oklahoma Memorial Stadium • Norman, Oklahoma	L 17–59
September 17	Miami (ACC)	Appalachian State	Kidd Brewer Stadium • Boone, North Carolina	L 45–10
September 17	Georgia State	Wisconsin (Big Ten)	Camp Randall Stadium • Madison, Wisconsin	L 17–23
September 17	Idaho	Washington State (Pac-12)	Martin Stadium • Pullman, Washington	L 6–56
September 17	New Mexico State	Kentucky (SEC)	Commonwealth Stadium • Lexington, Kentucky	L 42–62
September 17	Texas State	Arkansas (SEC)	Donald W. Reynolds Razorback Stadium • Fayetteville, Arkansas	L 3–42
October 1	Louisiana–Monroe	Auburn (SEC)	Jordan–Hare Stadium • Auburn, Alabama	L 7–58
October 15	Georgia Southern	Georgia Tech (ACC)	Bobby Dodd Stadium • Atlanta	L 24–35
October 29	New Mexico State	Texas A&M (SEC)	Kyle Field • College Station, Texas	L 10–52
November 5	Georgia Southern	Ole Miss (SEC)	Vaught–Hemingway Stadium • Oxford, Mississippi	L 27–37
November 19	South Alabama	LSU (SEC)	Tiger Stadium • Baton Rouge, Louisiana	Canceled due to Hurricane Matthew
November 19	Louisiana–Lafayette	Georgia (SEC)	Sanford Stadium • Athens, Georgia	L 21–35

=== 2016 records against non-conference opponents ===
Regular Season

Power 5 Conferences	Record
ACC	0–3
Big Ten	0–0
Big 12	0–1
Pac-12	0–2
SEC	1–8
Power 5 Total	1–14
Other FBS Conferences	Record
American	0–2
Conference USA	2–1
Independents	1–0
MAC	2–3
Mountain West	3–4
Other FBS Total	8–12
FCS Opponents	Record
Football Championship Subdivision	11–1
Total Non-Conference Record	20–27

Postseason

Power 5 Conferences	Record
ACC	0–0
Big Ten	0–0
Big 12	0–0
Pac-12	0–0
SEC	0–0
Power 5 Total	0–0
Other FBS Conferences	Record
American	1–0
Conference USA	0–1
Independents	0–0
MAC	2–0
Mountain West	1–1
Other FBS Total	4–2
Total Bowl Record	4–2

== Players of the Year ==
2016 Sun Belt Player of the Year awards

Award	Player	School
Player of the Year	Ja'Von Rolland-Jones	Arkansas State
Offensive Player of the Year	Jalin Moore	Appalachian State
Defensive Player of the Year	Rashad Dillard	Troy
Freshman of the Year	Clifton Duck	Appalachian State
Newcomer of the Year	Aikeem Coleman	Idaho
Coach of the Year	Paul Petrino	Idaho

== All-Sun BeltTeam ==
Coaches All-Conference Selections

Position	Player	Class	Team
First Team Offense
QB	Brandon Silvers	JR	Troy
RB	Jalin Moore	SO	Appalachian State
RB	Jordan Chunn	JR	Troy
WR	Robert Davis	SR	Georgia State
WR	Al Riles	SR	Louisiana-Lafayette
WR	Emanuel Thompson	JR	Troy
TE	Gerald Everett	SR	South Alabama
OL	Parker Collins	SR	Appalachian State
OL	Colby Gossett	JR	Appalachian State
OL	Jemar Clark	SR	Arkansas State
OL	Andy Kwon	SR	Georgia Southern
OL	Antonio Garcia	SR	Troy
First Team Defense
DL	Chris Odom	SR	Arkansas State
DL	Ja'Von Rolland-Jones	JR	Arkansas State
DL	Randy Allen	SR	South Alabama
DL	Rashad Dillard	SR	Troy
LB	Ironhead Gallon	SR	Georgia Southern
LB	Otha Peters	SR	Louisiana-Lafayette
LB	Rodney Butler	SR	New Mexico State
DB	Clifton Duck	FR	Appalachian State
DB	Mondo Williams	SR	Appalachian State
DB	Monshadrik Hunter	SR	Arkansas State
DB	Bobby Baker	SR	Georgia State
DB	Jeremy Reaves	JR	South Alabama
First Team Special Teams
PK	Younghoe Koo	SR	Georgia Southern
P	Austin Rehkow	SR	Idaho
RS	Jabir Frye	FR	Troy
AP	Jordan Chunn	JR	Troy

Position	Player	Class	Team
Second Team Offense
QB	Matt Linehan	JR	Idaho
RB	Marcus Cox	SR	Appalachian State
RB	Elijah McGuire	SR	Louisiana-Lafayette
WR	Shaedon Meadors	JR	Appalachian State
WR	Josh Magee	SR	South Alabama
WR	Deondre Douglas	SO	Troy
TE	Blake Mack	JR	Arkansas State
OL	Beau Nunn	SR	Appalachian State
OL	Colton Jackson	SR	Arkansas State
OL	Steve Matlock	SR	Idaho
OL	Jeff Savage	SR	Louisiana-Monroe
OL	Tyler Lassiter	SR	Troy
Second Team Defense
DL	Tyler Lassiter	SR	Appalachian State
DL	Tee Sims	JR	Appalachian State
DL	Aikeem Coleman	JR	Idaho
DL	Tueni Lupeamanu	SR	Idaho
LB	Joe Dillon	FR	Louisiana-Lafayette
LB	Eric Boggs	JR	Appalachian State
LB	Kennan Gilchrist	SR	Appalachian State
LB	Xavier Woodson-Luster	SR	Arkansas State
DB	Cody Brown	SR	Arkansas State
DB	Justin Clifton	SO	Arkansas State
DB	Jaden Wright	JR	New Mexico State
DB	Jalen Rountree	SR	Troy
Second Team Special Teams
PK	Austin Rehkow	SR	Idaho
P	Brandon McKee	SR	South Alabama
RS	Blaise Taylor	JR	Arkansas State
AP	Warren Wand	SO	Arkansas State

Honorable Mention: Appalachian State: Barrett Burns, A. J. Howard, Taylor Lamb, Myquon Stout; Arkansas State: Justice Hansen, Chris Humes, Waylon Roberson, Kendall Sanders; Georgia Southern: Kevin Ellison, Darius Jones, Jr., Ukeme Eligwe, B. J. Johnson III; Georgia State: Shawanye Lawrence, Alonzo McGee, Keith Rucker, Chandon Sullivan; Idaho: Trent Cowan, Kaden Elliss, Tony Lashley, Jordan Rose; Louisiana-Lafayette: Keenan Barnes, Karmichael Dunbar, Eddie Gordon, Tre'maine Lightfoot; Louisiana-Monroe: Justin Backus, David Griffith, Ajalen Holley, Frank Sutton, Jr.; New Mexico State: Kourtland Busby, Greg Hogan, Anthony McMeans, Tyler Rogers; South Alabama Roman Buchanan, Kalen Jackson, Xavier Johnson, Kevin Kutchera; Troy: Ryan Kay, William Lloyd, Kamryn Melton, Baron Poole; Texas State: Aaron Brewer, Bryan London, Gabe Loyd, Jordan Mittie.

== Home attendance ==
Team	Stadium (Capacity)	Game 1	Game 2	Game 3	Game 4	Game 5	Game 6	Game 7	Total	Average	% of Capacity
Appalachian State	Kidd Brewer Stadium (24,050)	23,374	**34,658**	**24,782**	**26,931**	**28,472**	18,699	—	156,916	26,152	108.74%
Arkansas State	Centennial Bank Stadium (30,382)	26,182	28,012	19,381	22,277	20,170	20,178	—	136,200	22,700	74.72%
Georgia Southern	Paulson Stadium (25,000)	21,250	**25,735**	23,474	16,786	16,850	—	—	104,095	20,819	83.28%
Georgia State	Georgia Dome (28,155)	12,233	13,179	15,223	13,363	13,106	23,513	—	90,617	15,102	53.64%
Idaho	Kibbie Dome (16,000)	11,987	13,392	10,278	9,049	11,242	—	—	55,948	11,190	69.94%
Louisiana–Lafayette	Cajun Field (36,900)	22,661	26,891	19,208	16,960	21,367	14,259	—	121,346	20,224	54.81%
Louisiana–Monroe	Malone Stadium (30,427)	24,718	9,524	12,735	16,073		—	—	63,050	15,762	51.8%
New Mexico State	Aggie Memorial Stadium (30,343)	17,852	8,142	10,085	6,280	5,366	—	—	47,725	9,545	31.46%
South Alabama	Ladd–Peebles Stadium (33,471)	17,691	13,086	14,741	30,837	11,565	11,017		98,937	16,489	49.26%
Texas State	Bobcat Stadium (30,000)	**33,133**	22,845	18,278	15,314	8,010		—	97,580	19,560	65.05%
Troy	Veterans Memorial Stadium (30,000)	18,885	21,146	23,913	21,763	25,782	23,764	—	135,253	22,542	75.14%

Bold – Exceed capacity
†Season High

== NFL draft ==
The following list includes all Sun Belt players who were drafted in the 2017 NFL draft.

Round #	Pick #	NFL team	Player	Position	College
2	44	Los Angeles Rams	Gerald Everett	TE	South Alabama
3	85	New England Patriots	Antonio Garcia	T	Troy
5	183	Kansas City Chiefs	Ukeme Eligwe	LB	Georgia Southern
6	188	New York Jets	Elijah McGuire	RB	Louisiana–Lafayette
6	209	Washington Redskins	Robert Davis	WR	Georgia State
