= Trent Miles =

American football player and coach (born 1963)

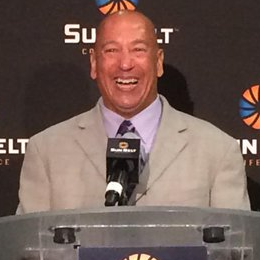
- Miles at 2015 Sun Belt Media Day

Notre Dame Fighting Irish football
- Title: Senior offensive analyst

Personal information
- Born: July 29, 1963 (age 63); Terre Haute, Indiana, U.S.

Career information
- College: Indiana State

Career history

Playing
- Indiana State (1982–1986; Wide receiver)

Coaching
- Indiana State (1987) Graduate assistant; New Mexico (1988–1989) Graduated Assistant; Oklahoma (1990) Graduate assistant; Northern Illinois (1991–1993) Wide receivers coach; Northern Illinois (1994) Defensive backs coach; Hawaii (1995) Wide receivers coach; Hawaii (1996) Defensive backs coach; Fresno State (1997–1999) Wide receivers coach; Green Bay Packers (2000) Wide receivers/quality control coach; Stanford (2001) wide receivers coach; Notre Dame (2002–2004) Wide receivers coach; Washington (2005–2007) Running backs coach; Indiana State (2008–2012) Head Coach; Georgia State (2013–2016) Head coach; Philadelphia Eagles (2017–2021) Offensive quality control/assistant running backs coach; LSU (2022–2023) Senior offensive analyst; Notre Dame (2024–present) Senior offensive analyst

Awards and highlights
- As coach: Super Bowl champion (LII); Sun Belt Coach of the Year (2015); Missouri Valley Coach of the Year (2010); AFCA Region #4 Coach of the Year (2010, 2012)

Head coaching record
- Career: 29–74 (0–1 in bowl games)

Trent Gaylord Miles (born July 29, 1963) is an American football coach and former player. He was most recently the head football coach at Georgia State University, a position he assumed in November 2012 and held until he was fired on November 12, 2016. From 2008 to 2012, Miles was the head coach at his alma mater Indiana State University, from which he holds a bachelor's degree in criminology."

== Coaching career ==
Miles spent twenty seasons as an assistant football coach at the collegiate level. Before arriving at Indiana State, Miles was the running backs coach at Washington. Miles was an assistant coach in various capacities at New Mexico, Oklahoma, Northern Illinois, and Hawaii, Fresno State, Green Bay Packers, Stanford and Notre Dame prior to becoming the head coach at Indiana State.

=== Head coach at Indiana State ===
Miles was named the Sycamores' 23rd head football coach on December 4, 2007. On October 24, 2009, in his second season, Miles earned his first collegiate head coaching victory, when the Sycamores defeated the Western Illinois Leathernecks by a score of 17–14 in the yearly homecoming game. The game drew a crowd of over 6,000 fans. It was ISU's first victory in 33 games.

Following the Sycamores' first road victory (30–24 over Youngstown State University) in seven seasons (2004), the 2010 season marked the first winning season for Indiana State since 1996. The Sycamores finished the 2010 season with a 6–5 record, tied for third in the Missouri Valley Football Conference (MVFC) at 4–4.

Due to Miles' success during the 2010 season, he was recognized as the Valley Football Coach of the Year by a panel of MVFC coaches, sports information directors, and media personnel. On December 6, 2010, Coach Miles was named the Region #4 Coach of the Year by the American Football Coaches Association.> He was a finalist for the Eddie Robinson Coach of the Year and Liberty Mutual Coach of the Year awards.

On Saturday, Oct. 13, 2012, at the Fargodome in Fargo, North Dakota, Trent Miles' unranked Indiana State Sycamores upset top-ranked North Dakota State, 17–14.

Indiana State's Johnny Towalid returned 2 interceptions of North Dakota State, a 27-yarder in the second quarter and a 31-yarder in the fourth quarter. North Dakota State pulled within 17–14, but Indiana State's Larry King intercepted a third pass to seal the win. Indiana State's Shakir Bell rushed for 96 yards on 26 carries.

With the upset, the Sycamores ended the defending FCS champions' 10-game winning streak. Indiana State moved to 5–2, 3–1 Missouri Valley on the season. This was Indiana State's first win over a #1 ranked opponent.

=== Head coach at Georgia State ===
Miles became the second head coach in the history of the young Georgia State Panthers football program, succeeding the retiring Bill Curry. The program only began playing intercollegiate football in the 2010 season, but planned to jump to the top, NCAA Division I FBS level, by 2013 and joined the Sun Belt Conference. In his first high-profile hire, Miles selected Jeff Jagodzinski as his offensive coordinator.

Miles was fired as head coach of Georgia State on November 11, 2016, following a loss to Louisiana Monroe 37–23.

=== NFL ===
Miles was a member of the Philadelphia Eagles' Super Bowl LII Championship staff. Prior to the 2017 NFL season, he spent the 2000 NFL season as a member of the Green Bay Packers staff, as part of the NFL Intern Coaching Program.

== Head coaching record ==
Year	Team	Overall	Conference	Standing	Bowl/playoffs
Indiana State Sycamores (Missouri Valley Football Conference) (2008–2012)
2008	Indiana State	0–12	0–8	9th	
2009	Indiana State	1–10	1–7	8th	
2010	Indiana State	6–5	4–4	T–3rd	
2011	Indiana State	6–5	4–4	T–4th	
2012	Indiana State	7–4	5–3	T–3rd	
Indiana State:		20–36	14–26		
Georgia State Panthers (Sun Belt Conference) (2013–2016)
2013	Georgia State	0–12	0–7	8th	
2014	Georgia State	1–11	0–8	11th	
2015	Georgia State	6–7	5–3	4th	L Cure
2016	Georgia State	2–8 (Note: Miles was fired after the first ten games of the 2016 season. Tim Lappano served as interim head coach for the final two games of the season. Georgia State finished the year 3–9 overall and 2–6 in Sun Belt Conference play, tying for eighth place.)	1–5		
Georgia State:		9–38	6–23		
Total:		29–74			
