= Otha Peters =

American football player (born 1994)

Profile
- Position: Linebacker

Personal information
- Born: February 27, 1994 (age 32); Covington, Louisiana
- Listed height: 6 ft 0 in (1.83 m)
- Listed weight: 235 lb (107 kg)

Career information
- High school: Covington (LA) High
- College: Louisiana-Lafayette
- NFL draft: 2017: undrafted

Career history
- Seattle Seahawks (2017)*; Washington Redskins (2017); Kansas City Chiefs (2018)*; Winnipeg Blue Bombers (2020–2021)*
- * Offseason or practice squad member only

Awards and highlights
- First-team All-Sun Belt (2016)

Career NFL statistics
- Total tackles: 3
- Sacks: 0
- Pass deflections: 0
- Stats at Pro Football Reference

Otha Peters Jr. (born February 27, 1994) is an American football linebacker who is a free agent. He played college football for Louisiana-Lafayette.

== College career ==
Peters attended Louisiana-Lafayette after transferring from the University of Arkansas where he was a 2012 SEC All-Freshman team selection. After sitting out the 2014 season following the transfer, Peters earned 2015 Honorable Mention All-Sun Belt recognition and 2016 First-team All-Sun Belt honors for the Ragin' Cajuns.

== Professional career ==
=== Seattle Seahawks ===
Peters signed with the Seattle Seahawks as an undrafted free agent on May 12, 2017. He was waived by the team on September 2, 2017.

=== Washington Redskins ===
On November 13, 2017, Peters was signed to the Washington Redskins' practice squad. He was promoted on the active roster on December 12. He was waived on April 13, 2018.

=== Kansas City Chiefs ===
On August 1, 2018, Peters signed with the Kansas City Chiefs. He was waived on September 1, 2018.

=== Winnipeg Blue Bombers ===
On January 6, 2020, Peters signed with the Winnipeg Blue Bombers. He was released on July 19, 2021.
