= Ironhead Gallon =

American gridiron football player (born 1994)

No. 36
- Position: Safety

Personal information
- Born: January 18, 1994 (age 32); Madison, Florida, U.S.
- Listed height: 5 ft 10 in (1.78 m)
- Listed weight: 203 lb (92 kg)

Career information
- High school: Madison (FL)
- College: Georgia Southern
- NFL draft: 2017: undrafted

Career history
- Arizona Cardinals (2017)*; Philadelphia Eagles (2018)*; Ottawa Redblacks (2019–2021)*
- * Offseason or practice squad member only

Awards and highlights
- First-team All-Sun Belt (2016)

Deshawntee "Ironhead" Gallon (born January 18, 1994) is an American former professional football safety. He played college football at Georgia Southern.

== Professional career ==
=== Arizona Cardinals ===
Gallon signed with the Arizona Cardinals as an undrafted free agent on May 2, 2017. He was waived on September 2, 2017.

=== Philadelphia Eagles ===
Gallon was signed by the Philadelphia Eagles on August 27, 2018. He was waived on September 1, 2018.

=== Ottawa Redblacks ===
After the CFL canceled the 2020 season due to the COVID-19 pandemic, Gallon chose to opt-out of his contract with the Ottawa Redblacks on September 3, 2020. He re-signed with the team on November 2, 2020. He was released by the Redblacks on June 24, 2021, and re-signed again on July 5. He was released on July 29, 2021.

== Personal life ==
As a big fan of former New Orleans Saints' running back Craig "Ironhead" Heyward, Gallon's mother's ex-husband began calling him "Ironhead" as a child. During his time at Georgia Southern friends and teammates also began calling him "Ironhead".
