= Tim Lappano =

American football player and coach (born 1957)

Biographical details
- Born: 1957 (age 68–69)

Playing career
- 1975–1979: Idaho

Coaching career (HC unless noted)
- 1981: Joel E. Ferris HS (WA) (assistant)
- 1982–1985: Idaho (RB)
- 1986: Wyoming (RB)
- 1987–1990: Washington State (RB)
- 1991: Washington State (OC)
- 1992–1995: California (AHC/RB)
- 1996: Wyoming (WR)
- 1997: Purdue (co-OC/WR)
- 1998: Seattle Seahawks (RB)
- 1999–2002: Oregon State (OC/QB)
- 2003–2004: San Francisco 49ers (RB)
- 2005–2008: Washington (OC/QB)
- 2009–2011: Detroit Lions (TE)
- 2012–2013: Detroit Lions (WR)
- 2014–2016: Georgia State (WR)
- 2016: Georgia State (interim HC)
- 2019: Salt Lake Stallions (OC)

Head coaching record
- Overall: 1–1

Tim Lappano is an American football coach, most recently the offensive coordinator for the Salt Lake Stallions of the Alliance of American Football. He has coached a variety of positions at both the collegiate and professional levels, such as coaching Brandon Pettigrew as the tight ends coach and Calvin Johnson as the wide receivers coach of the Detroit Lions through the 2013 season.

== Playing career ==
From Spokane, Washington, Lappano played high school football at Gonzaga Prep and graduated in 1975. He set numerous records as a Bullpup and the school retired his number 32.

A running back, he played college football for the Idaho Vandals of the Big Sky Conference from 1975 through 1979, and set a league record for freshman, averaging over eight yards per carry. A hamstring injury in prior to his junior year hampered his output in 1977 and he was redshirted under new head coach Jerry Davitch in 1978. Recurring headaches in 1979 limited his playing time as a senior. Lappano graduated from the University of Idaho in Moscow in 1983.

== Coaching career ==
Lappano's first collegiate coaching position was at his alma mater under head coach Dennis Erickson, whom he followed to Wyoming and back to the Palouse at Washington State and stayed in Pullman under new head coach Mike Price in 1989. When Joe Tiller left to become head coach at Wyoming, Lappano succeeded him as offensive coordinator at WSU in 1991, and guided quarterback Drew Bledsoe and running back Steve Broussard. He left for California under new head coach Keith Gilbertson in 1992, then coached under Tiller for two seasons at Wyoming and Purdue. Lappano later coached under Erickson in the NFL at Seattle and San Francisco and in the Pac-10 at Oregon State. He also worked under Tyrone Willingham for four seasons at Washington in Seattle.

In 2018, Lappano joined the Salt Lake Stallions of the newly-formed Alliance of American Football as the offensive coordinator.

== Head coaching record ==
Year	Team	Overall	Conference	Standing	Bowl/playoffs
Georgia State Panthers (Sun Belt Conference) (2016)
2016	Georgia State	1–1	1–1		
Georgia State:		1–1	1–1		
Total:		1–1			
