= 2013 Louisiana–Lafayette Ragin' Cajuns football team =

American college football season

2013 Louisiana–Lafayette Ragin' Cajuns football

Sun Belt co-champion (vacated)

New Orleans Bowl, W 24–21 (vacated) vs. Tulane
- Conference: Sun Belt Conference
- Record: 1–4, 8 wins vacated (0–2 Sun Belt, 5 wins vacated)
- Head coach: Mark Hudspeth (3rd season)
- Offensive coordinator: Jay Johnson (3rd season)
- Offensive scheme: Spread
- Defensive coordinator: James Willis (1st season)
- Base defense: 4–3
- Home stadium: Cajun Field

2013 Sun Belt Conference football standings
	Conf.			Overall
Team	W		L	W		L
Arkansas State $	5	–	2	8	–	5
Western Kentucky	4	–	3	8	–	4
South Alabama	4	–	3	6	–	6
Troy	4	–	3	6	–	6
Louisiana–Monroe	4	–	3	6	–	6
Texas State	2	–	5	6	–	6
Louisiana–Lafayette *	0	–	2	1	–	4
Georgia State **	0	–	7	0	–	12
$ – Conference champion; * – Louisiana–Lafayette vacated eight wins due to NCAA violations ** – Georgia State ineligible for postseason play due to FCS-to-FBS transition rules

The 2013 Louisiana–Lafayette Ragin' Cajuns football program represented the University of Louisiana at Lafayette as a member of the Sun Belt Conference in the 2013 NCAA Division I FBS football season. They were led by third-year head coach Mark Hudspeth and played their home games at Cajun Field. They finished the season 9–4 overall and 5–2 in Sun Belt play to claim a share of the conference title with Arkansas State. Louisiana–Lafayette was invited to the New Orleans Bowl for the third consecutive year, where they defeated Tulane. However, in 2015 Louisiana–Lafayette vacated eight wins including their New Orleans Bowl victory and Sun Belt Conference co-championship due to alleged major NCAA violations.

== Preseason ==
=== Award watchlists ===
Award	Player	Position	Year
Davey O'Brien Award	Terrance Broadway	QB	JR
Rimington Trophy	Andre Huval	C	SR

=== Sun Belt Media Day ===
==== Predicted standings ====
Sun Belt Conference predicted standings
Predicted finish	Team	Votes (1st Place)
1	Louisiana-Lafayette	57 (4)
2	Louisiana-Monroe	57 (2)
3	Arkansas State	45
4	Western Kentucky	44
5	Troy	35
6	Texas State	23
7	South Alabama	19
8	Georgia State	8

==== Preseason All–Conference Team ====
Offensive

OL Andre Huval

Defense

DL Christian Ringo
LB Justin Anderson
DB Isaiah Newsome

== Roster ==
2013 Louisiana-Lafayette Ragin' Cajuns football team roster
Players
Coaches
Offense

Pos.	#	Name	Class
WR	2	La Marcus Allen	Fr
RB	3	Montrel Carter	So
WR	4	Scott Austin	Fr
QB	6	Jalen Nixon	Fr
QB	7	D'Shae Landor	Fr
QB	8	Terrance Broadway	Jr
WR	9	Ricky Johnson	Sr
TE	10	Larry Pettis	Jr
WR	11	James Butler	Jr
WR	15	Jamal Robinson	Jr
QB	16	Brooks Haack	Fr
WR	17	Lance Pace	Fr
WR	18	Devin Scott	Fr
RB	22	Elijah McGuire	Fr
RB	26	Effrem Reed	So
WR	27	Billy Christian	Sr
RB	28	Marcus Jackson	So
TE	31	Andrew Hebert	Sr
RB	41	Torrey Pierce	So
RB	46	Alonzo Harris	Jr
OL	62	Jarad Martin	Jr
OL	63	Jeremy Sparks	Fr
OL	65	Zach Tarver	Fr
OL	67	Daniel Quave	Jr
OL	68	Octravian Anderson	So
OL	69	Greg Siener	So
OL	70	Mykhael Quave	So
C	71	Andre Huval	Sr
OL	72	Terry Johnson	Jr
OL	73	Ethan Rosenbalm	Fr
OL	77	Daniel Lemelle	Sr
OL	78	Allen Cummins	Fr
OL	79	Evyn Perry	Sr
WR	80	Adam Savoie	So
TE	81	Nick Byrne
WR	83	Jared Johnson	Fr
WR	84	Devin Figaro	Sr
TE	85	Ian Thompson	Sr
WR	86	Jacob Maxwell	Sr
WR	87	Darryl Surgent	Sr
WR		Quanties Armand	Fr
TE		Matt Barnes	Fr
TE		Jacob Beasly	Fr
WR		Alex Biedenharn	Fr
QB		Ross Duhon	Fr
WR		Darius Hoggins	Fr
OL		Grant Horst	Fr
OL		Brandon McMasters	Fr
QB		Patrick Morton	Fr
WR		Jerrell Richardson	Fr
TE		Evan Tatford	Fr
OL		Christian Voelkel	Fr
OL		D'Aquin Withrow	Fr

Defense

Pos.	#	Name	Class
CB	2	Simeon Thomas	Fr
CB	3	Jevante Watson	So
S	4	Trevence Patt	Jr
LB	5	Darius Barksdale	Jr
CB	6	Cedrick Tillman	Jr
CB	7	Corey Trim	Jr
S	11	O'Neal Parker	So
S	15	Zachary DeGrange	So
CB	17	DeMarcus Watts-Bracken	Jr
CB	19	Dominick Jones	Fr
S	20	Will Burrowes	Sr
S	21	Rodney Gillis	Sr
S	23	Tracy Walker	Fr
S	25	Al Riles	Fr
S	27	T.J. Worthy	So
LB	29	Tyren Alexander	So
LB	30	Brandon Nash	Sr
LB	34	Justin Anderson	Sr
LB	35	Boris Anyama	Jr
LB	36	Zach Bourque	Jr
LB	37	Hunter Thibodeaux	Sr
LB	38	Trae Johnson	Jr
LB	39	Chris Hill	So
DT	43	Thomas Singleton	Fr
LB	44	Kevin Fouquier	Fr
DL	47	Darrien Batiste	Fr
LB	49	Rodney Smith, Jr.	Fr
LB	51	Tre'Maine Lightfoot	Fr
DE	52	Dominique Tovell	So
DL	53	Marvin Martin	Jr
LB	56	Christian Sager	Jr
DE	57	Chris Prater	So
LB	59	Jake Molbert	Jr
DL	66	Leo Jones	Fr
DL	74	Justin Hamilton	Jr
DL	90	Blain Winston	Fr
DL	92	Christian Ringo	Jr
DL	93	Marquis White	So
DL	94	Karmichael Dunbar	Fr
DL	96	Brandon McCray	Sr
DL	97	Sherard Johnson	Fr
DL	99	Remaine Douglas	Fr
CB		Jalen Alexander	Fr
DL		Carter Berry	Fr
DT		Jacoby Briscoe	Fr
DB		Troy McCollum	Fr
CB		Reggie Miles	Fr
DL		Landon Smith	Fr
DL		Rodrick Stephens	Fr
DL		Emanuel Terrell	Fr

Special teams

Pos.	#	Name	Class
K	33	Stephen Brauchle	So
LS	40	Jake Guidry	So
K	45	Hunter Stover	Jr
P	48	Daniel Cadona	Jr
LS	82	John Broussard	Jr

Head coach

- Mark Hudspeth (Delta State)

Coordinators/assistant coaches

- Jay Johnson (Northern Iowa)
  Offensive coordinator
- Marquase Lovings (Howard)
  Assistant head coach
- Jorge Munoz (Bethany (KS))
  Assistant head coach
- Mitch Rodrigue (Nicholls State)
  Assistant head coach
- Tommy Rybacki (Jacksonville State)
  Safeties
- Reed Stringer (Delta State)
  Assistant head coach
- Rusty Whitt (Abilene Christian)
  Strength & conditioning coach
- Troy Wingerter (Louisiana)
  Director of football operations
- Ryan Trichel (Southeastern Louisiana)
  Director of player personnel
- A. J. Smith (Louisiana)
  Quality control coach

Legend

- (C) Team captain
- (S) Suspended
- (I) Ineligible
- Injured
- Redshirt

Roster
Last update: January 4, 2019

== Schedule ==
Date	Time	Opponent	Site	TV	Result	Attendance
August 31	3:00 pm	at Arkansas*	Donald W. Reynolds Razorback Stadium; Fayetteville, AR	SECRN	L 14–34	69,801
September 7	5:30 pm	at Kansas State*	Bill Snyder Family Football Stadium; Manhattan, KS	FS1	L 27–48	53,073
September 14	6:00 pm	Nicholls State*	Cajun Field; Lafayette, LA	ESPN3	W 70–7 (vacated)	28,871
September 21	5:00 pm	at Akron*	InfoCision Stadium; Akron, OH	ESPN3	W 35–30	18,806
October 5	6:00 pm	Texas State	Cajun Field; Lafayette, LA	RCN/ESPN3	W 48–24 (vacated)	23,108
October 15	7:00 pm	at Western Kentucky	Houchens Industries–L. T. Smith Stadium; Bowling Green, KY	ESPN2	W 37–20 (vacated)	16,359
October 22	7:00 pm	at Arkansas State	Liberty Bank Stadium; Jonesboro, AR	ESPN2	W 23–7 (vacated)	24,578
November 2	4:00 pm	New Mexico State*^{†}	Cajun Field; Lafayette, LA	RCN/ESPN3	W 49–35 (vacated)	30,028
November 7	6:30 pm	Troy	Cajun Field; Lafayette, LA	ESPNU	W 41–36 (vacated)	22,562
November 16	1:00 pm	at Georgia State	Georgia Dome; Atlanta, GA	ESPN3	W 35–21 (vacated)	14,415
November 30	6:00 pm	Louisiana–Monroe	Cajun Field; Lafayette, LA (Battle on the Bayou)	Sun Belt Network	L 28–31	25,309
December 7	7:00 pm	at South Alabama	Ladd–Peebles Stadium; Mobile, AL	RCN/ESPN3	L 8–30	16,124
December 21	8:00 pm	at Tulane*	Mercedes-Benz Superdome; New Orleans, LA (New Orleans Bowl)	ESPN	W 24–21 (vacated)	54,728
*Non-conference game; ^{†}Homecoming; All times are in Central time

- Source: Schedule

== Game summaries ==
=== @ Arkansas ===
Louisiana-Lafayette at Arkansas – Game summary

Quarter	1	2	3	4	Total
Ragin' Cajuns	0	7	7	0	14
Razorbacks	7	13	14	0	34

at Donald W. Reynolds Razorback Stadium, Fayetteville, AR

- Date: August 31
- Game time: 3:00 p.m. CST
- Game weather: 92 °F (33 °C); scattered clouds
- Game attendance: 69,801
- Referee: Marc Curles
- TV: FSN

Game information

First quarter

- ARK - Javontee Herndon 6-yard TD pass from Brandon Allen, Zach Hocker kick good, 8:24 (ARK 7-0)

Second quarter

- ULL - Alonzo Harris 2-yard TD run, Stephen Brauchle kick good, 13:58 (TIE 7-7)
- ARK - Herndon 49-yard TD pass from Allen, Hocker kick good, 11:30 (ARK 14-7)
- ARK - Hocker 22-yard field goal, 5:18 (ARK 17-7)
- ARK - Hocker 34-yard field goal, 0:00 (ARK 20-7)

Third quarter

- ARK - Kiero Small 10-yard TD pass from Allen, Hocker kick good, 8:39 (ARK 27-7)
- ULL - Jacob Maxwell 10-yard TD pass from Terrance Broadway, Brauchle kick good, 6:20 (AKR 27-14)
- ARK - Jonathan Williams 75-yard TD run, Josh Henson kick good, 6:04 (ARK 34-14)

Top passers

- ARK - Brandon Allen - 15/22, 230 yards, 3 TD
- ULL - Terrance Broadway - 15/28, 171 yards, TD, INT

Top rushers

- ARK - Jonathon Williams - 18 carries, 151 yards, TD
- ULL - Alonzo Harris - 10 carries, 56 yards, TD

Top receivers

- ARK - Hunter Henry - 5 receptions, 78 yards
- ULL - Jacob Maxwell - 6 receptions, 77 yards, TD

=== @ Kansas State ===
Louisiana-Lafayette at Kansas State – Game summary

Quarter	1	2	3	4	Total
Ragin' Cajuns	3	0	21	3	27
Wildcats	10	10	21	7	48

at Bill Snyder Family Football Stadium, Manhattan, KS

- Date: September 7
- Game time: 5:30 p.m. CST
- Game weather: 102 °F (39 °C); sunny
- Game attendance: 53,073
- Referee: C. Castleberry
- TV: FS1

Game information

First quarter

- KSU - Jack Cantele 29-yard field goal, 9:17 (KSU 3-0)
- ULL - Stephen Brauchle 26-yard field goal, 6:13 (TIE 3-3)
- KSU - John Hubert 7-yard TD run, Cantele kick good, 0:59 (KSU 10-3)

Second quarter

- KSU - Daniel Sams 13-yard TD run, Cantele kick good, 11:20 (KSU 17-3)
- KSU - Cantele 27-yard field goal, 0:11 (KSU 20-3)

Third quarter

- KSU - Hunter Stover kickoff returned for 94-yard TD by Tremaine Thompson, Cantele kick good, 14:48 (KSU 27-3)
- KSU - Jake Waters 1-yard TD run, Cantele kick good, 10:15 (KSU 34-3)
- ULL - Cantele kickoff returned for 100-yard TD by Darryl Surgent, Brauchle kick good, 10:02 (KSU 34-10)
- ULL - Terrance Broadway 4-yard TD run, Brauchle kick good, 8:07 (KSU 34-17)
- KSU - Ty Zimmerman 32-yard TD pass interception from Broadway, Cantele kick good, 7:09 (KSU 41-17)
- ULL - Jamal Robinson 18-yard TD pass from Broadway, Brauchle kick good, 3:35 (KSU 41-23)

Fourth quarter

- ULL - Brauchle 24-yard field goal, 10:55 (KSU 41-27)
- KSU - Hubert 2-yard TD run, Cantele kick good, 8:01 (KSU 48-27)

Top passers

- KSU - Jake Waters - 22/31, 278 yards, 2 INT
- ULL - Terrance Broadway - 18/30, 193 yards, TD, INT

Top rushers

- KSU - Daniel Sams - 8 carries, 63 yards, TD
- ULL - Alonzo Harris - 13 carries, 74 yards

Top receivers

- KSU - Tyler Lockett - 8 receptions, 111 yards
- ULL - Jamal Robinson - 6 receptions, 83 yards, TD

=== Nicholls State ===
Nicholls State at Louisiana-Lafayette – Game summary

Quarter	1	2	3	4	Total
Colonels	0	7	0	0	7
Ragin' Cajuns	28	21	14	7	70

at Cajun Field, Lafayette, LA

- Date: September 14
- Game time: 6:00 p.m. CST
- Game weather: 80 °F (27 °C); sunny
- Game attendance: 28,871
- Referee: Jason Autrey
- TV: ESPN3

Game information

First quarter

- ULL - Alonzo Harris 65-yard TD run, Stephen Brauchle kick good, 13:41 (ULL 7-0)
- ULL - Terrance Broadway 24-yard TD run, Brauchle kick good, 7:50 (ULL 14-0)
- ULL - Torrey Pierce 7-yard TD run, Brauchle kick good, 1:47 (ULL 21-0)
- ULL - Justin Anderson 58-yard pass interception returned for TD, Brauchle kick good, 0:53 (ULL 28-0)

Second quarter

- ULL - Pierce 2-yard TD run, Brauchle kick good, 5:45 (ULL 35-0)
- ULL - Elijah McGuire 4-yard TD run, Brauchle kick good, 3:23 (ULL 42-0)
- ULL - McGuire 11-yard TD run, Brauchle kick good, 2:28 (ULL 49-0)
- NICH - Demon Bolt 36-yard TD pass from Tuskani Figaro, Andrew Dolan kick good, 1:25 (ULL 49-7)

Third quarter

- ULL - Jamal Robinson 25-yard TD pass from Broadway, Brauchle kick good, 11:15 (ULL 56-7)
- ULL - McGuire 42-yard TD run, Brauchle kick good, 8:24 (ULL 63-7)

Fourth quarter

- ULL - Montrel Carter 1-yard TD run, Brauchle kick good, 14:03 (ULL 70-7)

Top passers

- ULL - Terrance Broadway - 10/13, 149 yards, TD, INT
- NICH - Tuskani Figaro - 5/11, 77 yards, TD, INT

Top rushers

- ULL - Elijah McGuire - 9 carries, 137 yards, 3 TD
- NICH - Tuskani Figaro - 9 carries, 40 yards

Top receivers

- ULL - Devin Scott - reception, 37 yards
- NICH - Xavier Marcus - 3 receptions, 54 yards

=== @ Akron ===
Louisiana-Lafayette at Akron – Game summary

Quarter	1	2	3	4	Total
Ragin' Cajuns	7	7	7	14	35
Zips	0	14	3	13	30

at InfoCision Stadium-Summa Field, Akron, OH

- Date: September 21
- Game time: 5:00 p.m. CST
- Game weather: 68 °F (20 °C); partly cloudy
- Game attendance: 18,809
- Referee: Kevin Stine
- TV: ESPN3

Game information

First quarter

- ULL - Jamal Robinson 9-yard TD pass from Terrance Broadway, Stephen Brauchle kick good, 8:00 (ULL 7-0)

Second quarter

- ULL - Broadway 15-yard TD run, Brauchle kick good, 9:51 (ULL 14-0)
- AKR - Zach D'Orazio 77-yard TD pass from Kyle Pohl, Robert Stein kick good, 9:03 (ULL 14-7)
- AKR - Jawon Chisholm 22-yard TD run, Stein kick good, 5:26 (TIE 14-14)

Third quarter

- AKR - Stein 49-yard field goal, 4:45 (AKR 17-14)
- ULL - Robinson 27-yard TD pass from Broadway, Brauchle kick good, 0:57 (ULL 21-17)

Fourth quarter

- AKR - Fransohn Bickley 37-yard TD pass from Pohl, Stein kick good, 13:51 (AKR 23-21)
- ULL - Broadway 13-yard TD run, Brauchle kick good, 8:07 (ULL 28-24)
- ULL - Darryl Surgent 14-yard TD pass from Broadway, Brauchle kick good, 6:19 (ULL 35-24)
- AKR - Bickley 28-yard TD pass from Pohl, 0:29 (ULL 35-30)

Top passers

- ULL - Terrance Broadway - 25/37, 305 yards, 3 TD, INT
- AKR - Kyle Pohl - 27/43, 321 yards, 3 TD, 2 INT

Top rushers

- ULL - Terrance Broadway - 15 carries, 68 yards, 2 TD
- AKR - Conor Hundley - 10 carries, 50 yards

Top receivers

- ULL - Jamal Robinson - 8 receptions, 124 yards, 2 TD
- AKR - Zach D'Orazio - 4 receptions, 111 yards, TD

=== Texas State ===
Texas State at Louisiana-Lafayette – Game summary

Quarter	1	2	3	4	Total
Bobcats	0	3	7	14	24
Ragin' Cajuns	14	14	17	3	48

at Cajun Field, Lafayette, LA

- Date: October 5
- Game time: 5:00 p.m. CST
- Game weather: 83 °F (28 °C); partly cloudy
- Game attendance: 23,106
- Referee: Perry Havener
- TV: ESPN3

Game information

First quarter

- ULL - Alonzo Harris 4-yard TD run, Stephen Brauchle kick good, 7:04 (ULL 7-0)
- ULL - Darryl Surgent 44-yard TD pass from Terrance Broadway, Brauchle kick good, 4:06 (ULL 14-0)

Second quarter

- ULL - Jamal Robinson 34-yard TD pass from Broadway, Brauchle kick good, 8:24 (ULL 21-0)
- TXST - Jason Dann 33-yard field goal, 2:33 (ULL 21-3)
- ULL - Robinson 4-yard TD pass from Broadway, Brauchle kick good, 0:28 (ULL 28-3)

Third quarter

- ULL - James Butler 20-yard TD pass from Broadway, Brauchle kick good, 14:07 (ULL 35-3)
- ULL - Brauchle 32-yard field goal, 10:38 (ULL 38-3)
- ULL - Elijah McGuire 4-yard TD run, Brauchle kick good, 3:56 (ULL 45-3)
- TXST - Brandon Smith 92-yard kickoff returned for TD, Dann kick good, 3:39 (ULL 45-10)

Fourth quarter

- ULL - Brauchle 25-yard field goal, 7:43 (ULL 48-10)
- TXST - Smith 100-yard kickoff returned for TD, Dann kick good, 7:27 (ULL 48-17)
- TXST - Duke DeLanccellotti 2-yard TD run, Dann kick good, 1:07 (ULL 48-24)

Top passers

- ULL - Terrance Broadway - 18/23, 335 yards, 4 TD
- TXST - Tyler Jones - 10/15, 66 yards

Top rushers

- ULL - Alonzo Harris - 16 carries, 78 yards, TD
- TXST - Tyler Jones - 13 carries, 58 yards

Top receivers

- ULL - Jamal Robinson - 4 receptions, 114 yards, 2 TD
- TXST - Brandon Smith - 3 receptions, 22 yards

=== @ Western Kentucky ===
Louisiana-Lafayette at Western Kentucky – Game summary

Quarter	1	2	3	4	Total
Ragin' Cajuns	0	13	10	14	37
Hilltoppers	10	3	0	7	20

at Houchens Industries-L. T. Smith Stadium, Bowling Green, KY

- Date: October 15
- Game time: 7:00 p.m. CST
- Game weather: 75 °F (24 °C); cloudy, chance of rain
- Game attendance: 16,359
- Referee: Jeff Hilyer
- TV: ESPN2

Game information

First quarter

- WKU - Mitchell Henry 14-yard TD pass from Brandon Doughty, Garrett Schwettman kick good, 11:33 (WKU 7-0)
- WKU - Schwettman 29-yard field goal, 3:13 (WKU 10-0)

Second quarter

- ULL - Al Riles 99-yard intercepted pass for TD, Stephen Brauchle kick good, 6:41 (WKU 10-7)
- ULL - Alonzo Harris 1-yard TD run, Brauchle kick no good, 1:32 (ULL 13-10)
- WKU - Schwettman 28-yard field goal, 0:00 (TIE 13-13)

Third quarter

- ULL - Brauchle 23-yard field goal, 7:04 (ULL 16-13)
- ULL - Terrance Broadway 1-yard TD run, Brauchle kick good, 1:21 (ULL 23-13

Fourth quarter

- ULL - Jacob Maxwell 24-yard TD pass from Broadway, Brauchle kick good, 9:43 (ULL 30-13)
- WKU - Antonio Andrew 1-yard TD run, Schwettman kick good, 7:02 (ULL 30-20)
- ULL - Harris 2-yard TD run, Brauchle kick good, 2:37 (ULL 37-20)

Top passers

- ULL - Terrance Broadway - 5/12, 90 yards, TD
- WKU - Brandon Doughty - 18/23, 260 yards, TD, 2 INT

Top rushers

- ULL - Alonzo Harris - 22 carries, 115 yards, 2 TD
- WKU - Antonio Andrews - 28 carries, 154 yards, TD

Top receivers

- ULL - Jamal Robinson - 3 receptions, 57 yards
- WKU - Nicholas Norris - 3 receptions, 69 yards

=== @ Arkansas State ===
Louisiana-Lafayette at Arkansas State – Game summary

Quarter	1	2	3	4	Total
Ragin' Cajuns	10	10	3	0	23
Red Wolves	0	7	0	0	7

at Liberty Bank Stadium, Jonesboro, AR

- Date: October 22
- Game time: 7:00 p.m. CST
- Game weather: 60 °F (16 °C); clear skies and cool
- Game attendance: 24,578
- Referee: Tony Backert
- TV: ESPN2

Game information

First quarter

- ULL - Stephen Brauchle 36-yard field goal, 9:30 (ULL 3-0)
- ULL - Alonzo Harris 3-yard TD run, Brauchle kick good, 1:11 (ULL 10-0)

Second quarter

- ULL - Harris 3-yard TD run, Brauchle kick good, 10:44 (ULL 17-0)
- ARST - Adam Kennedy 3-yard TD run, Brian Davis kick good, 3:39 (ULL 17-7)
- ULL - Brauchle 38-yard field goal, 0:00 (ULL 20-0)

Third quarter

- ULL - Brauchle 30-yard field goal, 0:03 (ULL 23-7)

Top passers

- ULL - Terrance Broadway - 18/28, 205 yards, INT
- ARST - Adam Kennedy - 11/20, 89 yards, INT

Top rushers

- ULL - Elijah McGuire - 10 carries, 110 yards
- ARST - Michael Gordon - 7 carries, 31 yards

Top receivers

- ULL - Jamal Robinson - 7 receptions, 104 yards
- ARST - J. D. McKissic – 6 receptions, 51 yards

=== New Mexico State ===
New Mexico State at Louisiana-Lafayette – Game summary

Quarter	1	2	3	4	Total
Aggies	21	7	0	7	35
Ragin' Cajuns	7	7	13	22	49

at Cajun Field, Lafayette, LA

- Date: November 2
- Game time: 4:00 p.m. CST
- Game weather: 71 °F (22 °C); clear
- Game attendance: 30,028
- Referee: Charles Lewis
- TV: ESPN3

Game information

First quarter

- NMSU - Andrew McDonald 1-yard TD run, Maxwell Johnson kick good, 9:35 (NMSU 7-0)
- NMSU - Austin Franklin 65-yard TD pass from McDonald, Johnson kick good, 4:51 (NMSU 14-0)
- ULL - Darryl Surgent 68-yard TD pass from Terrance Broadway, Stephen Brauchle kick good, 4:37 (NMSU 14-7)
- NMSU - Travaughn Colwell 36-yard TD pass to McDonald, Johnson kick good, 0:48 (NMSU 21-7)

Second quarter

- NMSU - Xavier Hall 1-yard TD run, Johnson kick good, 9:23 (NMSU 28-7)
- ULL - Alonzo Harris 2-yard TD run, Brauchle kick good, 5:00 (NMSU 28-14)

Third quarter

- ULL - Harris 6-yard TD run, Brauchle kick no good, 9:22 (NMSU 28-20)
- ULL - Elijah McGuire 51-yard TD run, Brauchle kick good, 6:35 (NMSU 28-27)

Fourth quarter

- ULL - Harris 5-yard TD run, Jamal Robinson two-point conversion pass to Broadway good, 10:40 (ULL 35-28)
- ULL - Harris 3-yard TD run, Brauchle kick good, 10:10 (ULL 42-28)
- NMSU - Franklin 7-yard TD pass from McDonald, Johnson kick good, 2:23 (ULL 42-35)
- ULL - Harris 30-yard TD run, Brauchle kick good, 0:52 (ULL 49-35)

Top passers

- ULL - Terrance Broadway - 14/20, 231 yards, TD, INT
- NMSU - Andrew McDonald - 24/34, 327 yards, 3 TD, INT

Top rushers

- ULL - Alonzo Harris - 16 carries, 106 yards, 5 TD
- NMSU - Travaughn Colwell - 16 carries, 58 yards

Top receivers

- ULL - Darryl Surgent - 3 receptions, 73 yards, TD
- NMSU - Austin Franklin - 13 receptions, 140 yards, 2 TD

=== Troy ===
Troy at Louisiana-Lafayette – Game summary

Quarter	1	2	3	4	Total
Trojans	6	20	3	7	36
Ragin' Cajuns	21	14	0	6	41

at Cajun Field, Lafayette, LA

- Date: November 7
- Game time: 6:30 p.m. CST
- Game weather: 54 °F (12 °C); clear
- Game attendance: 22,562
- Referee: Jeff Hilyer
- TV: ESPNU

Game information

First quarter

- TROY - Will Scott 39-yard field goal, 11:15 (TROY 3-0)
- ULL - Elijah McGuire 38-yard TD run, Stephen Brauchle kick good, 9:07 (ULL 7-3)
- ULL - Darryl Surgent 67-yard punt return for TD, Brauchle kick good, 7:37 (ULL 14-3)
- TROY - Scott 53-yard field goal, 4:09 (ULL 14-6)
- ULL - McGuire 60-yard TD pass from Terrance Broadway, Brauchle kick good, 3:32 (ULL 21-6)

Second quarter

- TROY - Jordan Chunn 1-yard TD run, Scott kick good, 13:30 (ULL 21-12)
- ULL - Broadway 11-yard TD run, Brauchle kick good, 10:22 (ULL 28-12)
- TROY - B.J. Chitty 6-yard TD pass from Khary Franklin, Scott kick good, 4:03 (ULL 28-20)
- TROY - Camren Hudson 65-yard interception returned for TD, Scott kick no good, 1:24 (ULL 28-26)
- ULL - Effrem Reed 36-yard TD pass from Broadway, Brauchle kick good, 0:45 (ULL 35-26)

Third quarter

- TROY - Scott 21-yard field goal, 6:25 (ULL 35-29)

Fourth quarter

- ULL - Broadway 2-yard TD run, 14:57 (ULL 41-29)
- TROY - Eric Thomas 3-yard TD pass from Corey Robinson, Scott kick good, 6:59 (ULL 41-26)

Top passers

- ULL - Terrance Broadway - 8/13, 185 yards, 2 TD, INT
- TROY - Corey Robinson - 25/44, 271 yards, TD

Top rushers

- ULL - Elijah McGuire - 7 carries, 82 yards, TD
- TROY - Brandon Burks - 15 carries, 126 yards

Top receivers

- ULL - Elijah McGuire - reception, 60 yards, TD
- TROY - Eric Thomas - 5 receptions, 93 yards, TD

=== @ Georgia State ===
Louisiana-Lafayette at Georgia State – Game summary

Quarter	1	2	3	4	Total
Ragin' Cajuns	7	14	7	7	35
Panthers	0	14	7	0	21

at Georgia Dome, Atlanta, GA

- Date: November 16
- Game time: 1:00 p.m. CST
- Game weather: 72 °F (22 °C); N/A (indoors)
- Game attendance: 14,415
- Referee: Kevin Stine
- TV: ESPN3

Game information

First quarter

- ULL - Elijah McGuire 80-yard TD pass from Terrance Broadway, Stephen Brauchle kick good, 11:51 (ULL 7-0)

Second quarter

- GAST - Travis Evans 5-yard TD run, Wil Lutz kick good, 14:26 (TIE 7-7)
- ULL - Alonzo Harris 1-yard TD run, Brauchle kick good, 10:54 (ULL 14-7)
- ULL - Darryl Surgent 50-yard TD pass from Broadway, Brauchle kick good, 2:21 (ULL 21-7)
- GAST - Keith Rucker 42-yard TD pass from Ronnie Bell, Lutz kick good, 0:14 (ULL 21-14)

Third quarter

- GAST - Albert Wilson 22-yard TD pass from Bell, Lutz kick good, 5:01 (TIE 21-21)
- ULL - McGuire 36-yard TD pass from Broadway, Brauchle kick good 1:47 (ULL 28-21)

Fourth quarter

- ULL - Jamal Robinson 13-yard TD pass from Broadway, Brauchle kick good, 7:58 (ULL 35-21)

Top passers

- ULL - Terrance Broadway - 10/16, 234 yards, 4 TD
- GAST - Ronnie Bell - 19/34, 229 yards, 2 TD, INT

Top rushers

- ULL - Elijah McGuire - 11 carries, 107 yards
- GAST - Albert Wilson - 5 carries, 64 yards

Top receivers

- ULL - Elijah McGuire - 3 receptions, 125 yards, 2 TD
- GAST - Keith Rucker - 6 receptions, 121 yards, TD

=== Louisiana–Monroe ===
Louisiana-Monroe at Louisiana-Lafayette – Game summary

Quarter	1	2	3	4	Total
Warhawks	7	7	14	3	31
Ragin' Cajuns	14	7	0	7	28

at Cajun Field, Lafayette, LA

- Date: November 30
- Game time: 6:00 p.m. CST
- Game weather: 56 °F (13 °C); clear
- Game attendance: 25,309
- Referee: Tony Backert
- TV: SBN

Game information

First quarter

- ULL - Terrance Broadway 2-yard TD run, Stephen Brauchle kick good, 9:59 (ULL 7-0)
- ULL - Elijah McGuire 3-yard TD run, Brauchle kick good, 5:50 (ULL 14-0)
- ULM - Ajalen Holley 29-yard TD pass from Kolton Browning, Justin Manton kick good, 0:38 (ULL 14-7)

Second quarter

- ULM - DeVontae McNeal 77-yard TD run, Manton kick good, 10:01 (TIE 14-14)
- ULL - Darryl Surgent 24-yard TD pass from Broadway, Brauchle kick good, 6:57 (ULL 21-14)

Third quarter

- ULM - Rashon Ceaser 16-yard TD pass from Browning, Manton kick no good, 10:01 (TIE 21-21)
- ULM - Centarius Donald 4-yard TD run, Ajalen Holley two-point conversion pass good from Browning, 2:23 (ULM 28-21)

Fourth quarter

- ULM - Manton 28-yard field goal, 13:39 (ULM 31-21)
- ULL - Jamal Robinson 25-yard TD pass from Brooks Haack, Brauchle kick good, 0:53 (ULM 31-28)

Top passers

- ULM - Kolton Browning - 18/28, 247 yards, 2 TD
- ULL - Terrance Broadway - 13/27, 178 yards, TD, 3 INT

Top rushers

- ULM - DeVontae McNeal - 4 carries, 76 yards, TD
- ULL - Elijah McGuire - 14 carries, 119 yards, TD

Top receivers

- ULM - Rashon Ceaser - 6 receptions, 110 yards, TD
- ULL - Jamal Robinson - 5 receptions, 98 yards, TD

=== @ South Alabama ===
Louisiana-Lafayette at South Alabama – Game summary

Quarter	1	2	3	4	Total
Ragin' Cajuns	0	0	0	8	8
Jaguars	17	13	0	0	30

at Ladd-Peebles Stadium, Mobile, AL

- Date: December 7
- Game time: 7:00 p.m. CST
- Game weather: 41 °F (5 °C); cloudy
- Game attendance: 16,124
- Referee: Kevin Stine
- TV: ESPN3

Game information

First quarter

- USA - Aleem Sunanon 40-yard field goal, 5:53 (USA 3-0)
- USA - Kndall Houston 1-yard TD run, Sunanon kick good, 4:45 (USA 10-0)
- USA - Kndall Houston 3-yard TD run, Sunanon kick good, 3:29 (USA 17-0)

Second quarter

- USA - Sunanon 19-yard field goal, 10:16 (USA 20-0)
- USA - Sunanon 20-yard field goal, 0:55 (USA 23-0)
- USA - Qudarius Ford 42-yard interception return for TD, Sunanon kick good, 0:16 (USA 30-0)

Fourth quarter

- ULL - Ricky Johnson 47-yard TD pass from Jalen Nixon, Nixon two-point conversion run good, 4:50 (USA 30-8)

Top passers

- USA - Ross Metheny - 13/23, 171 yards
- ULL - Jalen Nixon - 4/9, 94 yards, TD, INT

Top rushers

- USA - Jay Jones - 19 carries, 144 yards
- ULL - Alonzo Harris - 15 carries, 62 yards

Top receivers

- USA - Wes Saxton - 5 receptions, 88 yards
- ULL - Ricky Johnson - 2 receptions, 60 yards, TD

=== Tulane (New Orleans Bowl) ===
Tulane vs. Louisiana-Lafayette – Game summary

Quarter	1	2	3	4	Total
Green Wave	0	14	7	0	21
Ragin' Cajuns	14	7	0	3	24

at Mercedes-Benz Superdome, New Orleans, LA

- Date: December 21
- Game time: 8:00 p.m. CST
- Game weather: 71 °F (22 °C); N/A (indoors)
- Game attendance: 54,728
- Referee: David Witvoet
- TV: ESPN

Game information

First quarter

- ULL - Elijah McGuire 27-yard TD run, Hunter Stover kick good, 10:57 (ULL 7-0)
- ULL - Alonzo Harris 15-yard TD run, Stephen Brauchle kick good, 2:10 (ULL 14-0)

Second quarter

- ULL - Corey Trim 82-yard interception returned for TD, Stover kick good, 12:31 (ULL 21-0)
- TULN - Orleans Darkwa 1-yard TD run, Cairo Santos kick good, 3:55 (ULL 21-7)
- TULN - Darkwa 7-yard TD run, Santos kick good, 1:58 (ULL 21-14)

Third quarter

- TULN - Darkwa 22-yard TD run, Santos kick good, 2:34 (TIE 21-21)

Fourth quarter

- ULL - Stover 27-yard field goal, 9:58 (ULL 24-21)

Top passers

- ULL - Terrance Broadway - 12/19, 143 yards, 2 INT
- TULN - Devin Powell - 10/21, 223 yards, INT

Top rushers

- ULL - Alonzo Harris - 13 carries, 74 yards, TD
- TULN - Orleans Darkwa - 16 carries, 83 yards, 3 TD

Top receivers

- ULL - Elijah McGuire - 7 receptions, 94 yards
- TULN - Ryan Grant - 7 receptions, 113 yards

== Post-Season ==
=== All-Sun Belt/American Teams ===
Offensive

RB Alonzo Harris, JR (first team)
RB Elijah McGuire, FR (first team)
OL Andre Huval, SR (first team)
WR Jamal Robinson, JR (second team)
OL Daniel Quave, JR (second team)

Defense

LB Justin Alexander, SR (first team)
DL Justin Hamilton, JR (second team)
DB Trevence Patt, JR (second team)

Specialists

RS Darryl Surgent, SR (first team)

Honorable Mentions

TE Jacob Maxwell, SR
DE Dominique Tovell, SO
