= Ryan Carrethers =

American football player (born 1991)

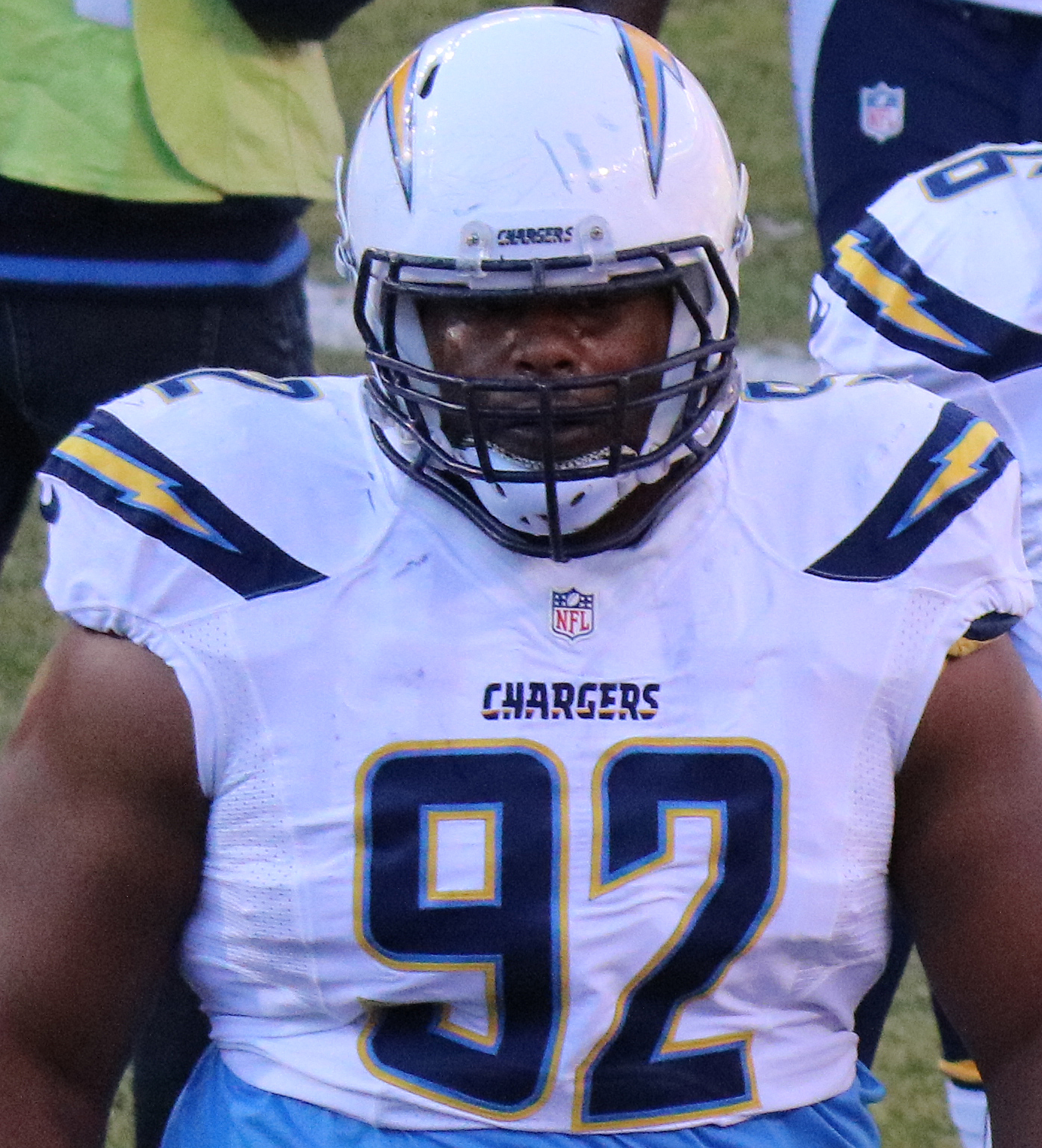
- Carrethers with the San Diego Chargers in 2016

No. 92, 90
- Position: Defensive tackle

Personal information
- Born: February 26, 1991 (age 35); Nashville, Tennessee, U.S.
- Listed height: 6 ft 2 in (1.88 m)
- Listed weight: 337 lb (153 kg)

Career information
- High school: Brentwood Academy (Brentwood, Tennessee)
- College: Arkansas State
- NFL draft: 2014: 5th round, 165th overall pick

Career history
- San Diego / Los Angeles Chargers (2014–2017)

Awards and highlights
- 2× First-team All-Sun Belt (2012, 2013)

Career NFL statistics
- Total tackles: 41
- Stats at Pro Football Reference

Ryan Carrethers (born February 26, 1991) is an American former professional football player who was a defensive tackle for the San Diego / Los Angeles Chargers of the National Football League (NFL). He was selected by San Diego in the fifth round of the 2014 NFL draft. He played college football for the Arkansas State Red Wolves.

== College career ==
In 2013, Carrethers was a preseason first-team Sun Belt player.

== Professional career ==
Carrethers was selected by the San Diego Chargers in the fifth round of the 2014 NFL draft. He was released on October 5, 2016, and was signed to the practice squad two days later. He was promoted back to the active roster on December 3, 2016.

On September 2, 2017, Carrethers was waived by the Chargers.
