= 2013 Texas State Bobcats football team =

American college football season

2013 Texas State Bobcats football
- Conference: Sun Belt Conference
- Record: 6–6 (2–5 Sun Belt)
- Head coach: Dennis Franchione (5th overall season)
- Co-offensive coordinators: Mike Schultz (3rd season); Jeff Conway (2nd season)
- Offensive scheme: Multiple
- Defensive coordinator: Craig Naivar (3rd season)
- Base defense: 4–2–5
- Home stadium: Bobcat Stadium

2013 Sun Belt Conference football standings
	Conf.			Overall
Team	W		L	W		L
Arkansas State $	5	–	2	8	–	5
Western Kentucky	4	–	3	8	–	4
South Alabama	4	–	3	6	–	6
Troy	4	–	3	6	–	6
Louisiana–Monroe	4	–	3	6	–	6
Texas State	2	–	5	6	–	6
Louisiana–Lafayette *	0	–	2	1	–	4
Georgia State **	0	–	7	0	–	12
$ – Conference champion; * – Louisiana–Lafayette vacated eight wins due to NCAA violations ** – Georgia State ineligible for postseason play due to FCS-to-FBS transition rules

The 2013 Texas State Bobcats football team represented Texas State University in the 2013 NCAA Division I FBS football season. The Bobcats were led by head coach Dennis Franchione, in his fifth overall year, and played their home games at Bobcat Stadium. This was the Bobcats first season in the Sun Belt Conference, and it was the first year the Bobcats were eligible to win a conference title or attend a bowl game after their 2-year FCS to FBS transition. Despite finishing the season with a record of 6–6 the Bobcats were not invited to a bowl game.

== Schedule ==
Date	Time	Opponent	Site	TV	Result	Attendance
August 31	6:00 pm	at Southern Miss*	M. M. Roberts Stadium; Hattiesburg, MS		W 22–15	25,729
September 7	6:00 pm	Prairie View A&M*	Bobcat Stadium; San Marcos, TX	ESPN3	W 28–3	20,136
September 21	6:00 pm	at No. 25 Texas Tech*	Jones AT&T Stadium; Lubbock, TX	FSSW+	L 7–33	60,997
September 28	6:00 pm	Wyoming*	Bobcat Stadium; San Marcos, TX	LHN	W 42–21	22,150
October 5	6:00 pm	at Louisiana–Lafayette	Cajun Field; Lafayette, LA	KNVA	L 24–48	23,108
October 12	6:00 pm	Louisiana–Monroe	Bobcat Stadium; San Marcos, TX	LHN	L 14–21	15,210
October 19	6:00 pm	Georgia State	Bobcat Stadium; San Marcos, TX	Sun Belt Network via KNVA	W 24–17	15,684
October 26	6:00 pm	South Alabama^{†}	Bobcat Stadium; San Marcos, TX	ESPN3	W 33–31	18,140
November 2	4:00 pm	at Idaho*	Kibbie Dome; Moscow, ID	KNVA	W 37–21	15,088
November 16	6:30 pm	at Arkansas State	Liberty Bank Stadium; Jonesboro, AR	Sun Belt Network via KNVA	L 21–38	23,143
November 23	6:00 pm	Western Kentucky	Bobcat Stadium; San Marcos, TX	LHN	L 7–38	17,051
November 29	1:00 pm	at Troy	Veterans Memorial Stadium; Troy, AL	ESPN3	L 28–42	13,073
*Non-conference game; ^{†}Homecoming; Rankings from Coaches' Poll released prior to the game; All times are in Central time

== Game summaries ==
=== Southern Miss ===
Texas State at Southern Miss

Team	1	2	3	4	Total
• Bobcats	7	7	0	8	22
Golden Eagles	0	3	9	3	15

- Date: August 31
- Location: M.M. Roberts Stadium
  Hattiesburg, MS
- Game start: 6:05 p.m. CST
- Elapsed time: 3:11
- Game attendance: 25,729
- Game weather: 93 °F (34 °C), Clear, winds at 1mph
- Referee: Wayne Winkler

=== Prairie View A&M ===
Prairie View A&M at Texas State

Team	1	2	3	4	Total
Panthers	0	0	3	0	3
• Bobcats	14	7	7	0	28

- Date: September 7
- Location: Jim Wacker Field at Bobcat Stadium
  San Marcos, TX
- Game start: 6:05 p.m. CST
- Elapsed time: 2:58
- Game attendance: 20,136
- Game weather: 83 °F (28 °C), Mostly Cloudy skies, winds gust at 26mph
- Referee: Jeff Hilyer
- TV announcers (ESPN3): Brock Bowling & Jay Taylor

=== Texas Tech ===
Texas State at Texas Tech

Team	1	2	3	4	Total
Bobcats	0	0	7	0	7
• Red Raiders	3	10	10	10	33

- Date: September 21
- Location: Jones AT&T Stadium
  Lubbock, TX
- Game start: 6:05 p.m. CST
- Elapsed time: 3:25
- Game attendance: 60,997
- Game weather: 80 °F (27 °C), Clear, winds SE at 5mph
- Referee: Charles Lewis
- TV announcers (FSSW+): Ron Thulin, Dave Lapham & Gary Reasons

=== Wyoming ===
Wyoming at Texas State

Team	1	2	3	4	Total
Cowboys	0	14	0	7	21
• Bobcats	7	7	14	14	42

- Date: September 28
- Location: Jim Wacker Field at Bobcat Stadium
  San Marcos, TX
- Game start: 6:06 p.m. CST
- Elapsed time: 6:19
- Game attendance: 22,150
- Referee: Kevin Stine
- TV announcers (LHN): Andrew Monaco & Kevin O'Connell

=== Louisiana-Lafayette ===
Texas State at Louisiana-Lafayette

Team	1	2	3	4	Total
Bobcats	0	3	7	14	24
• Ragin' Cajuns	14	14	17	3	48

- Date: October 5
- Location: Cajun Field
  Lafayette, LA
- Game start: 7:00 p.m. CST
- Elapsed time: 3:09
- Game attendance: 23,108
- Game weather: 83 °F (28 °C), Partly Cloudy, winds SSE at 7mph
- Referee: Perry Havener
- TV announcers (ESPN3): Jeff Palmero, Gerald Broussard & Erin Cofiell

=== Louisiana-Monroe ===
Louisiana-Monroe at Texas State

Team	1	2	3	4	Total
• Warhawks	7	0	7	7	21
Bobcats	0	0	6	8	14

- Date: October 12
- Location: Jim Wacker Field at Bobcat Stadium
  San Marcos, TX
- Game start: 6:06 p.m. CST
- Game attendance: 15,210
- Referee: Tony Backert
- TV announcers (LONG): Andrew Monaco & Kevin O'Connell

=== Georgia State ===
Georgia State at Texas State

Team	1	2	3	4	Total
Panthers	7	0	0	10	17
• Bobcats	7	3	0	14	24

- Date: October 19
- Location: Jim Wacker Field at Bobcat Stadium
  San Marcos, TX
- TV announcers (Sun Belt Network): Tom Dore, Cole Cubelic & Emily Gagnon

=== South Alabama ===
South Alabama at Texas State

Team	1	2	3	4	Total
Jaguars	0	3	7	21	31
• Bobcats	7	7	3	16	33

- Date: October 26
- Location: Jim Wacker Field at Bobcat Stadium
  San Marcos, TX
- Television network: ESPN3

=== Idaho ===
Texas State at Idaho

Team	1	2	3	4	Total
• Bobcats	7	16	7	7	37
Vandals	7	7	0	7	21

- Date: November 2
- Location: Kibbie Dome
  Moscow, ID
- TV announcers (KNVA): Sam Adams & Bill Ames

=== Arkansas State ===
Texas State at Arkansas State

Team	1	2	3	4	Total
Bobcats	14	7	0	0	21
• Red Wolves	7	14	14	3	38

- Date: November 16
- Location: Liberty Bank Stadium
  Jonesboro, AR
- TV announcers (Sun Belt Network): Tom Dore, Cole Cubelic & Emily Gagnon

=== WKU ===
WKU at Texas State

Team	1	2	3	4	Total
• Hilltoppers	0	17	0	21	38
Bobcats	0	7	0	0	7

- Date: November 23
- Location: Jim Wacker Field at Bobcat Stadium
  San Marcos, TX

=== Troy ===
Texas State at Troy

Team	1	2	3	4	Total
Bobcats	7	7	0	14	28
• Trojans	7	14	7	14	42

- Date: November 29
- Location: Veterans Memorial Stadium
  Troy, AL
