= 2013 Troy Trojans football team =

American college football season

2013 Troy Trojans football
- Conference: Sun Belt Conference
- Record: 6–6 (4–3 Sun Belt)
- Head coach: Larry Blakeney (23rd season)
- Offensive coordinator: Kenny Edenfield (4th season)
- Offensive scheme: Spread
- Defensive coordinator: Wayne Bolt (7th season)
- Base defense: 4–3
- Home stadium: Veterans Memorial Stadium

2013 Sun Belt Conference football standings
	Conf.			Overall
Team	W		L	W		L
Arkansas State $	5	–	2	8	–	5
Western Kentucky	4	–	3	8	–	4
South Alabama	4	–	3	6	–	6
Troy	4	–	3	6	–	6
Louisiana–Monroe	4	–	3	6	–	6
Texas State	2	–	5	6	–	6
Louisiana–Lafayette *	0	–	2	1	–	4
Georgia State **	0	–	7	0	–	12
$ – Conference champion; * – Louisiana–Lafayette vacated eight wins due to NCAA violations ** – Georgia State ineligible for postseason play due to FCS-to-FBS transition rules

The 2013 Troy Trojans football team represented Troy University during the 2013 NCAA Division I FBS football season. They were led by 23rd-year head coach Larry Blakeney and played their home games at Veterans Memorial Stadium as a member of the Sun Belt Conference. They finished the season 6–6, 4–3 in Sun Belt play to finish in a four-way tie for third place. Despite being bowl eligible, they were not selected to play in a bowl game.

== Schedule ==
Date	Time	Opponent	Site	TV	Result	Attendance
August 31	6:00 pm	UAB*	Veterans Memorial Stadium; Troy, AL	ESPN3	W 34–31 ^{OT}	21,398
September 7	6:00 pm	Savannah State*	Veterans Memorial Stadium; Troy, AL	ESPN3	W 66–3	20,021
September 12	6:30 pm	at Arkansas State	Liberty Bank Stadium; Jonesboro, AR	ESPNU	L 34–41	26,012
September 21	6:30 pm	at Mississippi State*	Davis Wade Stadium; Starkville, MS	SECRN	L 7–62	55,096
September 28	2:00 pm	at Duke*	Wallace Wade Stadium; Durham, NC	ESPN3	L 31–38	30,126
October 5	12:00 pm	South Alabama^{†}	Veterans Memorial Stadium; Troy, AL (rivalry)	Sun Belt Network	W 34–33	23,024
October 12	2:30 pm	at Georgia State	Georgia Dome; Atlanta, GA	Sun Belt Network	W 35–28	17,732
October 26	3:00 pm	at Western Kentucky	Houchens Industries–L. T. Smith Stadium; Bowling Green, KY	ESPN3	W 32–26	20,110
October 31	6:30 pm	Louisiana–Monroe	Veterans Memorial Stadium; Troy, AL	ESPNU	L 37–49	17,013
November 7	6:30 pm	at Louisiana	Cajun Field; Lafayette, LA	ESPNU	L 36–41	22,562
November 16	11:00 am	at Ole Miss*	Vaught–Hemingway Stadium; Oxford, MS	ESPNU	L 21–51	52,931
November 29	1:00 pm	Texas State	Veterans Memorial Stadium; Troy, AL	ESPN3	W 42–28	13,073
*Non-conference game; ^{†}Homecoming; All times are in Central time
