= 2013 South Alabama Jaguars football team =

American college football season

2013 South Alabama Jaguars football
- Conference: Sun Belt Conference
- Record: 6–6 (4–3 Sun Belt)
- Head coach: Joey Jones (5th season)
- Offensive coordinator: Robert Matthews (2nd season)
- Offensive scheme: Multiple
- Defensive coordinator: Kevin Sherrer (1st season)
- Base defense: 3–4
- Home stadium: Ladd–Peebles Stadium

2013 Sun Belt Conference football standings
	Conf.			Overall
Team	W		L	W		L
Arkansas State $	5	–	2	8	–	5
Western Kentucky	4	–	3	8	–	4
South Alabama	4	–	3	6	–	6
Troy	4	–	3	6	–	6
Louisiana–Monroe	4	–	3	6	–	6
Texas State	2	–	5	6	–	6
Louisiana–Lafayette *	0	–	2	1	–	4
Georgia State **	0	–	7	0	–	12
$ – Conference champion; * – Louisiana–Lafayette vacated eight wins due to NCAA violations ** – Georgia State ineligible for postseason play due to FCS-to-FBS transition rules

The 2013 South Alabama Jaguars football team represented the University of South Alabama in the 2013 NCAA Division I FBS football season. They were led by fifth-year head coach Joey Jones and played their home games at Ladd–Peebles Stadium in Mobile, Alabama as a member of the Sun Belt Conference. This season marked the first season the Jaguars' were eligible for the Sun Belt championship and to play in a bowl game. They finished the season 6–6, 4–3 in Sun Belt play to finish in a fourth way tie four third place. Despite being bowl eligible, they were not invited to a bowl game.

== Schedule ==
Date	Time	Opponent	Site	TV	Result	Attendance
August 29	6:30 p.m.	Southern Utah*	Ladd–Peebles Stadium; Mobile, AL	ESPN3	L 21–22	15,240
September 7	2:30 p.m.	at Tulane*	Mercedes-Benz Superdome; New Orleans, LA		W 41–39	19,414
September 14	6:30 p.m.	Western Kentucky	Ladd–Peebles Stadium; Mobile, AL	ESPN3	W 31–24	17,721
September 28	11:21 a.m.	at Tennessee*	Neyland Stadium; Knoxville, TN	SECTV	L 24–31	87,266
October 5	12:00 p.m.	at Troy	Veterans Memorial Stadium; Troy, AL (rivalry)	Sun Belt Network	L 33–34	23,024
October 19	2:00 p.m.	Kent State*^{†}	Ladd–Peebles Stadium; Mobile, AL		W 38–21	14,351
October 26	6:00 p.m.	at Texas State	Bobcat Stadium; San Marcos, TX	ESPN3	L 31–33	18,140
November 2	6:30 p.m.	Arkansas State	Ladd–Peebles Stadium; Mobile, AL	ESPN3	L 16–17	18,228
November 16	2:30 p.m.	at Navy*	Navy–Marine Corps Memorial Stadium; Annapolis, MD	CBSSN	L 14–42	33,086
November 23	6:00 p.m.	Louisiana–Monroe	Ladd–Peebles Stadium; Mobile, AL	Sun Belt Network	W 36–14	13,891
November 30	1:00 p.m.	at Georgia State	Georgia Dome; Atlanta, GA	ESPN3	W 38–17	13,697
December 7	7:00 p.m.	Louisiana–Lafayette	Ladd–Peebles Stadium; Mobile, AL	ESPN3	W 30–8	16,124
*Non-conference game; ^{†}Homecoming; All times are in Central time
