= Mitchell Henry (American football) =

American football player (1992–2017)

No. 83, 84, 85
- Position: Tight end

Personal information
- Born: December 11, 1992; Lexington, Kentucky, U.S.
- Died: June 30, 2017 (aged 24); Elizabethtown, Kentucky, U.S.
- Listed height: 6 ft 4 in (1.93 m)
- Listed weight: 252 lb (114 kg)

Career information
- High school: Elizabethtown
- College: Western Kentucky
- NFL draft: 2015: undrafted

Career history
- Green Bay Packers (2015)*; Denver Broncos (2015); Green Bay Packers (2015–2016)*; Baltimore Ravens (2016)*
- * Offseason or practice squad member only

Career NFL statistics
- Games played: 2
- Games started: 0
- Stats at Pro Football Reference

Charles Mitchell Henry (December 11, 1992 – June 30, 2017) was an American professional football player who was a tight end in the National Football League (NFL). He played college football for the Western Kentucky Hilltoppers. Henry was signed by the Green Bay Packers as an undrafted free agent in 2015. He also played for the Denver Broncos and Baltimore Ravens.

== Professional career ==
Pre-draft measurables
Height	Weight	40-yard dash	10-yard split	20-yard split	20-yard shuttle	Three-cone drill	Vertical jump	Broad jump	Bench press
6 ft 4 in (1.93 m)	252 lb (114 kg)	4.69 s	1.68 s	2.66 s	4.28 s	7.15 s	37 in (0.94 m)	9 ft 6 in (2.90 m)	15 reps
All values are from Pro Day

=== Green Bay Packers ===
After going undrafted in the 2015 NFL draft, Henry signed with the Green Bay Packers on May 8, 2015. On September 5, 2015, he was released by the Packers during final team cuts.

=== Denver Broncos ===
Henry was claimed off waivers by the Denver Broncos on September 6, 2015. He appeared in two games in the first five weeks of the Broncos season. On October 14, 2015, Henry was released by the Broncos to make room for the signing of tight end Richard Gordon.

=== Return to Green Bay ===
On October 16, 2015, Henry was signed to the Packers' practice squad, where he spent the rest of his rookie season. He was re-signed by the Packers after the season ended on January 18, 2016.

Entering his second season; Henry missed time during training camp due to a groin injury. He later broke the index finger on his right hand in the second preseason game against the Oakland Raiders, resulting in his having to wear a club cast on his hand for the second straight year. On August 30, 2016, Henry was placed on injured reserve. He was waived by the Packers after reaching an injury settlement on September 1, 2016.

=== Baltimore Ravens ===
Henry was signed to the Baltimore Ravens' practice squad on November 7, 2016, but was released three days later.

== Career statistics ==
=== College ===
Year	Team	G	GS	Receiving				
Year	Team	G	GS	Rec	Yds	Avg	Lng	TD
2011	Western Kentucky	11	2	8	105	13.1	31	3
2012	Western Kentucky	12	5	13	195	15.0	43	3
2013	Western Kentucky	12	6	25	305	12.2	33	2
2014	Western Kentucky	12	9	32	489	15.3	33	4
Total		47	22	78	1,094	14.0	43	12

=== NFL ===
Year	Team	G	GS	Receiving					Rushing					Fumbles	
Year	Team	G	GS	Rec	Yds	Avg	Lng	TD	Att	Yds	Avg	Lng	TD	FUM	Lost
Regular season
2015	DEN	2	0	0	0	0.0	0	0	0	0	0.0	0	0	0	0
Total		2	0	0	0	0.0	0	0	0	0	0.0	0	0	0	0

== Personal life ==
In December 2016, Henry was diagnosed with acute myeloid leukemia after being released by the Ravens. He started feeling pain in his shoulder in November, and doctors later discovered a cancerous mass in his chest. Henry received well-wishes from former coach Mike McCarthy, former teammate Peyton Manning, and others. Henry had been told by the Ravens that he was going to be re-signed soon, but then started feeling pain a few days after he was cut.

On June 30, 2017, Henry died from acute myeloid leukemia at the age of 24. He is survived by his wife Madison.
