= 2013 Arkansas State Red Wolves football team =

American college football season

2013 Arkansas State Red Wolves football

Sun Belt co-champion GoDaddy Bowl champion

GoDaddy Bowl, W 23–20 vs. Ball State
- Conference: Sun Belt Conference
- Record: 8–5 (5–2 Sun Belt)
- Head coach: Bryan Harsin (1st season; regular season); John Thompson (interim; bowl game)
- Co-offensive coordinators: Bush Hamdan (1st season); Eliah Drinkwitz (1st season)
- Offensive scheme: Multiple
- Defensive coordinator: John Thompson (2nd season)
- Base defense: Multiple
- Home stadium: Liberty Bank Stadium

2013 Sun Belt Conference football standings
	Conf.			Overall
Team	W		L	W		L
Arkansas State $	5	–	2	8	–	5
Western Kentucky	4	–	3	8	–	4
South Alabama	4	–	3	6	–	6
Troy	4	–	3	6	–	6
Louisiana–Monroe	4	–	3	6	–	6
Texas State	2	–	5	6	–	6
Louisiana–Lafayette *	0	–	2	1	–	4
Georgia State **	0	–	7	0	–	12
$ – Conference champion; * – Louisiana–Lafayette vacated eight wins due to NCAA violations ** – Georgia State ineligible for postseason play due to FCS-to-FBS transition rules

The 2013 Arkansas State Red Wolves football team represented Arkansas State University in the 2013 NCAA Division I FBS football season. For the third consecutive season, the Red Wolves were led by a first-year head coach, with Bryan Harsin, previously offensive coordinator at Texas, taking over from Gus Malzahn, who left to become head coach at Auburn.

Shortly after the end of the regular season, Harsin would himself leave Arkansas State, moving to Boise State, his alma mater and a program where he had served as an assistant from 2001 to 2010, after Chris Petersen left for Washington. Harsin did not coach Arkansas State in the GoDaddy Bowl; Arkansas State named defensive coordinator John Thompson as interim head coach for the bowl game.

The Red Wolves, members of the Sun Belt Conference, played their home games at Liberty Bank Stadium (renamed after the 2013 season to Centennial Bank Stadium) in Jonesboro, Arkansas.

== Schedule ==
Date	Time	Opponent	Site	TV	Result	Attendance
August 31	6:00 p.m.	Arkansas–Pine Bluff*	Liberty Bank Stadium; Jonesboro, AR	ESPN3	W 62–11	30,451
September 7	6:30 p.m.	at Auburn*	Jordan–Hare Stadium; Auburn, AL	SECRN	L 9–38	83,246
September 12	6:30 p.m.	Troy	Liberty Bank Stadium; Jonesboro, AR	ESPNU	W 41–34	26,012
September 21	3:30 p.m.	at Memphis*	Liberty Bowl Memorial Stadium; Memphis, TN (Paint Bucket Bowl)	ESPN3	L 7–31	36,279
September 28	6:30 p.m.	at Missouri*	Faurot Field; Columbia, MO	CSS/ESPN3	L 19–41	62,468
October 12	6:00 p.m.	Idaho*^{†}	Liberty Bank Stadium; Jonesboro, AR		W 48–24	26,781
October 22	7:00 p.m.	Louisiana–Lafayette	Liberty Bank Stadium; Jonesboro, AR	ESPN2	L 7–23	24,578
November 2	6:30 p.m.	at South Alabama	Ladd–Peebles Stadium; Mobile, AL	ESPN3	W 17–16	18,228
November 9	6:00 p.m.	at Louisiana–Monroe	Malone Stadium; Monroe, LA	ESPN3	W 42–14	13,427
November 16	6:30 p.m.	Texas State	Liberty Bank Stadium; Jonesboro, AR	Sun Belt Network	W 38–21	23,143
November 23	2:00 p.m.	Georgia State	Liberty Bank Stadium; Jonesboro, AR	ESPN3	W 35–33	18,512
November 30	3:00 p.m.	at Western Kentucky	Houchens Industries–L. T. Smith Stadium; Bowling Green, KY	ESPN3	L 31–34	14,417
January 5, 2014	8:00 p.m.	vs. Ball State*	Ladd–Peebles Stadium; Mobile, AL (GoDaddy Bowl)	ESPN	W 23–20	36,119
*Non-conference game; ^{†}Homecoming; All times are in Central time
