= 2013 Georgia State Panthers football team =

American college football season

2013 Georgia State Panthers football
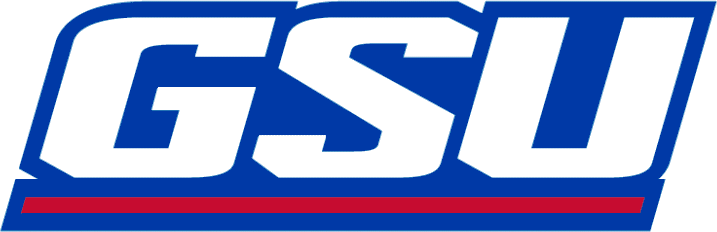
- Conference: Sun Belt Conference
- Record: 0–12 (0–7 Sun Belt)
- Head coach: Trent Miles (1st season)
- Offensive coordinator: Jeff Jagodzinski (1st season)
- Offensive scheme: Multiple
- Defensive coordinator: Jesse Minter (1st season)
- Base defense: 4–3
- Home stadium: Georgia Dome

2013 Sun Belt Conference football standings
	Conf.			Overall
Team	W		L	W		L
Arkansas State $	5	–	2	8	–	5
Western Kentucky	4	–	3	8	–	4
South Alabama	4	–	3	6	–	6
Troy	4	–	3	6	–	6
Louisiana–Monroe	4	–	3	6	–	6
Texas State	2	–	5	6	–	6
Louisiana–Lafayette *	0	–	2	1	–	4
Georgia State **	0	–	7	0	–	12
$ – Conference champion; * – Louisiana–Lafayette vacated eight wins due to NCAA violations ** – Georgia State ineligible for postseason play due to FCS-to-FBS transition rules

The 2013 Georgia State Panthers football team represented Georgia State University (GSU) in the 2013 NCAA Division I FBS football season. The Panthers were led by first year head coach Trent Miles and played their home games at the Georgia Dome. The 2013 season was the Panthers' first in the Sun Belt Conference and at the FBS level. As a result of this transition, the Panthers were ineligible to play in a bowl game regardless of their final record (0–12).

== Schedule ==
Date	Time	Opponent	Site	TV	Result	Attendance
August 30	7:00 p.m.	Samford*	Georgia Dome; Atlanta, GA	ESPN3	L 21–31	17,606
September 7	2:00 p.m.	Chattanooga*	Georgia Dome; Atlanta, GA	ESPN3	L 14–42	14,952
September 14	12:00 p.m.	at West Virginia*	Mountaineer Field; Morgantown, WV	ROOT	L 7–41	57,440
September 21	2:00 p.m.	Jacksonville State*	Georgia Dome; Atlanta, GA	ESPN3	L 26–32 ^{OT}	15,425
October 5	12:21 p.m.	at No. 1 Alabama*	Bryant–Denny Stadium; Tuscaloosa, AL	SECTV	L 3–45	101,254
October 12	3:30 p.m.	Troy^{†}	Georgia Dome; Atlanta, GA	Sun Belt Network	L 28–35	17,732
October 19	7:00 p.m.	at Texas State	Bobcat Stadium; San Marcos, TX	Sun Belt Network/	L 17–24	15,124
October 26	7:00 p.m.	at Louisiana–Monroe	Malone Stadium; Monroe, LA	ESPN3	L 10–38	11,357
November 2	1:00 p.m.	Western Kentucky	Georgia Dome; Atlanta, GA	Sun Belt Network	L 28–44	15,212
November 16	2:00 p.m.	Louisiana–Lafayette	Georgia Dome; Atlanta, GA	ESPN3	L 21–35	12,293
November 23	3:00 p.m.	at Arkansas State	Liberty Bank Stadium; Jonesboro, AR	ESPN3	L 33–35	18,512
November 30	2:00 p.m.	South Alabama	Georgia Dome; Atlanta, GA	ESPN3	L 17–38	13,697
*Non-conference game; ^{†}Homecoming; Rankings from AP Poll released prior to the game; All times are in Eastern time

== Season notes ==
After the loss to Chattanooga in the second week of the season, running back coach Tony Tiller was reassigned to a different position within the athletic department, being replaced by former Indiana State player and graduate assistant Brock Lough.

== Coaching staff ==
Name	Position	Season at Georgia St	Alma mater
Trent Miles	Head coach	1	Indiana State (1987)
Harold Etheridge	Assistant head coach, Offensive line	1	Western New Mexico (1982)
Jeff Jagodzinski	Offensive coordinator	1	Wisconsin–Whitewater (1985)
Jesse Minter	Defensive coordinator	1	Mount St. Joseph (2005)
Keary Colbert	Assistant Coach, Wide receivers	1	USC (2006)
Luke Huard	Assistant Coach, Quarterbacks	1	North Carolina (2002)
Shannon Jackson	Assistant Coach, Offensive line	1	Indiana State (2000)
Brock Lough	Graduate Assistant, Running Backs	1	Indiana State (2012)
J. D. Williams	Assistant Coach, Secondary	1	Fresno State (1990)
P. J. Volker	Assistant Coach, Linebackers	1	Mount St. Joseph (2005)

== Roster ==
2013 Georgia State Panthers football team roster
Players
Coaches
Offense

Pos.	#	Name	Class
WR	2	Albert Wilson	Sr
WR	4	Kelton Hill	Sr
WR	6	Darren McCray	Sr
RB	7	Parris Lee	Sr
WR	8	Jordan Giles	Sr
WR	9	Donovan Harden	Jr
QB	10	M. J. Reynolds	Fr
QB	11	Clay Chastain	So
WR	13	Lynquez Blair	Jr
RB	14	Duvall Smith	Jr
QB	16	Ben McLane	So
WR	17	Danny Williams	Sr
QB	18	Ronnie Bell	So
WR	19	Robert Davis	Fr
RB	21	Travis Evans	Sr
RB	22	Jonathan Jean-Bart	Fr
RB	25	Kyler Neal	Fr
RB	28	Gerald Howse	Jr
RB	31	Dontavis Crocker	Jr
TE	45	Keith Rucker	Fr
FB	47	Sean Jeppesen	Jr
G	50	Tim Wynn	Jr
OT	56	Ulrick John	Sr
G	60	Cade Yates	Sr
OT	79	Grant King	Sr
WR	80	Avery Sweeting	So

Defense

Pos.	#	Name	Class
CB	1	Nate Anthony	Sr
LB	3	Tarris Batiste	So
CB	5	Demarius Matthews	Sr
CB	9	Brent McClendon	Sr
LB	10	Robert Ferguson	Sr
S	12	Arington Jordan	Sr
S	15	Tyshaun Clemmons	Fr
LB	16	Robert Smith	Jr
DB	18	Mark Whitehead	So
S	20	LaDarion Young	Fr
DB	23	Robert Dowling	Fr
S	24	Kail Singleton	Sr
CB	26	Jamal Ransby	Sr
CB	27	Bruce Dukes	Jr
S	29	Rashad Stewart	Sr
S	30	Nick Henderson	So
LB	32	Allen McKay	Sr
LB	33	Kight Dallas	Fr
CB	35	Myles Morris	Fr
DB	37	Trent Hill	Fr
LB	38	Jameel Spencer	Fr
DL	43	Mackendy Cheridor	Fr
LB	44	Joseph Peterson	So
LB	46	Jarrell Robinson	Jr
CB	48	C.J. Scott	Jr
LB	50	Spencer Haywood	Jr
DL	52	Tevin Jones	Fr
DL	53	Tanner Strickland	Fr
DL	55	Carnell Hospon	Fr
DL	75	Terrance Woodward	Sr
DL	85	Shawayne Lawrence	Fr
DL	91	Nermin Delic	Jr
DL	92	Theo Agnew	Sr
LB	95	John Kelly	Sr
DL	97	Jalen Lawrence	Fr
LB	99	Melvin King	So

Special teams

Pos.	#	Name	Class
P	49	Matt Hubbard	Jr
LS	54	Scott McQueen	Sr
K, P	93	David Miller	Jr
K	96	Wil Lutz	So

Head coach

- Trent Miles

Coordinators/assistant coaches

Legend

- (C) Team captain
- (S) Suspended
- (I) Ineligible
- Injured
- Redshirt

Roster
Last update: January 3, 2017
