= 2013 Louisiana–Monroe Warhawks football team =

American college football season

2013 Louisiana–Monroe Warhawks football
- Conference: Sun Belt Conference
- Record: 6–6 (4–3 Sun Belt)
- Head coach: Todd Berry (4th season)
- Offensive coordinator: Steve Farmer (6th season)
- Offensive scheme: Air raid
- Defensive coordinator: Troy Reffett (5th season)
- Base defense: 3–3–5
- Home stadium: Malone Stadium

2013 Sun Belt Conference football standings
	Conf.			Overall
Team	W		L	W		L
Arkansas State $	5	–	2	8	–	5
Western Kentucky	4	–	3	8	–	4
South Alabama	4	–	3	6	–	6
Troy	4	–	3	6	–	6
Louisiana–Monroe	4	–	3	6	–	6
Texas State	2	–	5	6	–	6
Louisiana–Lafayette *	0	–	2	1	–	4
Georgia State **	0	–	7	0	–	12
$ – Conference champion; * – Louisiana–Lafayette vacated eight wins due to NCAA violations ** – Georgia State ineligible for postseason play due to FCS-to-FBS transition rules

The 2013 Louisiana–Monroe Warhawks football team represented University of Louisiana at Monroe in the 2013 NCAA Division I FBS football season. The team was led by fourth-year head coach Todd Berry. The Warhawks played their home games at Malone Stadium and competed in the Sun Belt Conference. They finished the season 6–6, 4–3 in Sun Belt play to finish in a four-way tie for third place. Despite being bowl eligible, they were not selected to play in a bowl game.

== Preseason ==
=== Award watch lists ===
- Kolton Browning – Maxwell Award Watch

== Roster ==
2013 Louisiana-Monroe Warhawks football team roster
Players
Coaches
Offense

Pos.	#	Name	Class
RB	2	Monterrell Washington	Sr
RB	5	Centarius Donald	Sr
QB	6	Brian Williams	Fr
RB	7	Jyruss Edwards	Sr
WR	8	Tavarese May	Sr
TE	11	Wes Smith	Fr
QB	12	Brayle Brown	So
WR	13	Colby Harper	Jr
QB	15	Kolton Browning	Sr
QB	16	Bivins Caracway III	Fr
QB	16	Ian McCoig	Jr
RB	19	Tyler Cain	Jr
RB	21	Tevin Horton	Fr
RB	22	Cortney Davis	So
WR	23	Kenzee Jackson	Jr
WR	26	Caleb Gammel	So
RB	28	DeVontae McNeal	So
RB	41	Nathan Meadors, Jr	Fr
OL	73	Trey Martin	Fr

Defense

Pos.	#	Name	Class
S	1	Isaiah Newsome	Sr
LB	3	Cameron Blakes	Sr
CB	4	Rob'Donovan Lewis	Jr
S	10	Cordero Smith	Jr
CB	14	Vincent Eddie	Sr
DE	18	Emmanuel Jefferies	Sr
CB	20	Justin Backus	Fr
CB	24	Trey Caldwell	So
S	25	Alex Johnson	Fr
DB	27	Grant Dotsy	Fr
S	29	Ferrando Joseph	Fr
DB	30	Marquis McCullum	Fr
S	31	Lenzy Pipkins	Fr
S	32	Tre' Hunter	Fr
LB	33	Tevyn Cagins	Fr
LB	34	Micheal Johnson	So
LB	36	Cody Robinson	So
S	37	Preston Coleman	Sr
S	38	Mitch Lane	So
S	39	Felix Blade	So
CB	40	Corey Davis	So
S	42	Roland Veal	Jr

Special teams

Pos.	#	Name	Class
K, P	17	Justin Manton	Jr
K	49	Alex Crist	So
K	94	Brandon Menard	Fr

Head coach

- Todd Berry (4th season)

Coordinators/assistant coaches

- Steve Farmer – Assistant Head Coach/Offensive Coordinator/Offensive Line
- Troy Reffett – Defensive Coordinator/Cornerbacks
- Bryan Applewhite – Running Backs/
- Jerry McManus – Tight Ends
- Jason Nichols – Outside Wide Receivers
- Travis Niekamp – Linebackers/Special Teams
- Mario Price – Inside Wide Receivers
- Everett Todd – Defensive Line
- Adam Waugh – Safeties
- Alex Washington – Graduate Assistant Coach
- James Truxillo – Graduate Assistant Coach
- Vince Logan – Director of Operations

Legend

- (C) Team captain
- (S) Suspended
- (I) Ineligible
- Injured
- Redshirt

Roster
Last update: September 9, 2012

== Schedule ==
Date	Time	Opponent	Site	TV	Result	Attendance
August 31	6:00 pm	at No. 16 Oklahoma*	Gaylord Family Oklahoma Memorial Stadium; Norman, OK	FSN (PPV)	L 0–34	84,911
September 7	6:00 pm	Grambling State*	Malone Stadium; Monroe, LA	ESPN3	W 48–10	23,600
September 14	11:30 am	at Wake Forest*	BB&T Field; Winston-Salem, NC	ACCRSN	W 21–19	26,505
September 21	3:00 pm	at No. 19 Baylor*	Floyd Casey Stadium; Waco, TX	FS1	L 7–70	42,967
September 28	6:00 pm	Tulane*	Malone Stadium; Monroe, LA	ESPN3	L 14–31	20,476
October 3	6:30 pm	Western Kentucky	Malone Stadium; Monroe, LA	ESPNU	L 10–31	16,317
October 12	6:00 pm	at Texas State	Bobcat Stadium; San Marcos, TX	LHN	W 21–14	15,210
October 26	6:00 pm	Georgia State^{†}	Malone Stadium; Monroe, LA	ESPN3	W 38–10	11,357
October 31	6:30 pm	at Troy	Veterans Memorial Stadium; Troy, AL	ESPNU	W 49–37	17,013
November 9	6:00 pm	Arkansas State	Malone Stadium; Monroe, LA	ESPN3	L 14–42	13,427
November 23	6:00 pm	at South Alabama	Ladd–Peebles Stadium; Mobile, AL	Sun Belt Network	L 14–36	13,891
November 30	6:00 pm	at Louisiana–Lafayette	Cajun Field; Lafayette, LA (Battle on the Bayou)	Sun Belt Network	W 31–28	25,309
*Non-conference game; ^{†}Homecoming; Rankings from Coaches' Poll released prior to the game; All times are in Central time

- Source: Schedule

== Game summaries ==
=== @ Oklahoma ===
Louisiana–Monroe @ Oklahoma

Team	1	2	3	4	Total
Warhawks	0	0	0	0	0
• #16 Sooners	0	13	21	0	34

- Date: August 31
- Location: Memorial Stadium
  Norman, Oklahoma
- Game start: 6:07 p.m. CDT
- Elapsed time: 3:32
- Game attendance: 84,991
- Game weather: Temperature: 100 • Wind: SE 5 MPH • Weather: Clear
- Referee: Scott Novak
- TV announcers (FSN PPV): Ron Thulin (Play-by-play), Dave Lapham (Color) & Chad McKee (Sideline)

In their first game of the season, the Warhawks lost, 34–0 to the Oklahoma Sooners.

Scoring summary

Quarter	Time	Drive			Team	Scoring information	Score	
Quarter	Time	Plays	Yards	TOP	Team	Scoring information	Louisiana–Monroe	Oklahoma
2	11:15	14	78	4:06	Oklahoma	Jalen Saunders 12-yard touchdown reception from Trevor Knight, Mike Hunnicutt kick good	0	7
2	5:34	13	53	3:00	Oklahoma	41-yard field goal by Mike Hunnicutt	0	10
2	0:39	11	56	4:12	Oklahoma	33-yard field goal by Mike Hunnicutt	0	13
3	10:42	5	47	1:39	Oklahoma	Brennan Clay 8-yard touchdown run, Mike Hunnicutt kick good	0	20
3	3:07	1	18	0:18	Oklahoma	Jalen Saunders 18-yard touchdown reception from Trevor Knight, Mike Hunnicutt kick good	0	27
3	0:38	3	20	1:24	Oklahoma	Trey Metoyer 13-yard touchdown reception from Trevor Knight, Mike Hunnicutt kick good	0	34
"TOP" = time of possession. For other American football terms, see Glossary of American football.							0	34

=== Grambling State ===
Grambling State @ Louisiana–Monroe

Team	1	2	3	4	Total
Tigers	7	0	0	3	10
• Warhawks	21	14	7	6	48

- Date: September 7
- Location: Malone Stadium
  Monroe, Louisiana
- Game start: 6:00 p.m. CDT
- Elapsed time: 3:13
- Game attendance: 23,600
- Game weather: Temperature: 98 • Wind: SW 6 • Weather: Partly Cloudy
- Referee: Tony Backert
- Television network: ESPN3

In their second game of the season, the Warhawks won, 48–10 over the Grambling State Tigers.

Scoring summary

Quarter	Time	Drive			Team	Scoring information	Score	
Quarter	Time	Plays	Yards	TOP	Team	Scoring information	Grambling State	Louisiana–Monroe
1	14:50	1	89		Louisiana–Monroe	Cortney Davis 89-yard kickoff return, Justin Manton kick good	0	7
1	9:44	10	75	5:06	Grambling State	Anthony McGhee 17-yard touchdown reception from D.J. Williams, Johnathan Wallace kick good	7	7
1	5:39	10	75	4:05	Louisiana–Monroe	Harley Scioneaux 18-yard touchdown reception from Kolton Browning, Justin Manton kick good	7	14
1	3:52	3	37	0:43	Louisiana–Monroe	Jyruss Edwards 19-yard touchdown run, Justin Manton kick good	7	21
2	14:53	5	63	1:03	Louisiana–Monroe	Je'Ron Hamm 16-yard touchdown reception from Kolton Browning, Justin Manton kick good	7	28
2	1:09	7	67	1:15	Louisiana–Monroe	Kenzee Jackson 11-yard touchdown reception from Kolton Browning, Justin Manton kick good	7	35
3	8:04	6	59	2:39	Louisiana–Monroe	DeVontae McNeal 34-yard touchdown run, Justin Manton kick good	7	42
4	13:36	12	66	5:59	Louisiana–Monroe	31-yard field goal by Justin Manton	7	45
4	9:25	6	18	2:02	Louisiana–Monroe	38-yard field goal by Justin Manton	7	48
4	5:34	4	7	1:26	Grambling State	25-yard field goal by Johnathan Wallace	10	48
"TOP" = time of possession. For other American football terms, see Glossary of American football.							10	48

=== @ Wake Forest ===
Louisiana–Monroe @ Wake Forest

Team	1	2	3	4	Total
• Warhawks	7	7	7	0	21
Demon Deacons	7	6	0	6	19

- Date: September 14
- Location: BB&T Field
  Winston-Salem, North Carolina
- Game start: 11:33 a.m. CDT
- Elapsed time: 3:24
- Game attendance: 26,505
- Game weather: Temperature: 67 • Wind: 8mph NE • Weather: Sunny
- Referee: Perry Havener
- Television network: RSN/ESPN3

In their third game of the season, the Warhawks won, 21–19 over the Wake Forest Demon Deacons.

Scoring summary

Quarter	Time	Drive			Team	Scoring information	Score	
Quarter	Time	Plays	Yards	TOP	Team	Scoring information	Louisiana–Monroe	Wake Forest
1	8:04	17	69	6:46	Louisiana–Monroe	Harley Scioneaux 1-yard touchdown reception from Kolton Browning, Justin Manton kick good	7	0
1	5:16	4	80	1:27	Wake Forest	Orville Reynolds 65-yard touchdown reception from Tanner Price, Chad Hedlund kick good	7	7
2	14:49	10	37	3:53	Wake Forest	28-yard field goal by Chad Hedlund	7	10
2	0:41	14	81	3:58	Louisiana–Monroe	Kenzee Jackson 5-yard touchdown reception from Kolton Browning, Justin Manton kick good	14	10
2	0:00	8	54	0:41	Wake Forest	38-yard field goal by Chad Hedlund	14	13
3	9:22	12	74	4:34	Louisiana–Monroe	Tavarese Maye 9-yard touchdown reception from Kolton Browning, Justin Manton kick good	21	13
4	0:04	11	97	1:55	Wake Forest	Orville Reynolds 23-yard touchdown reception from Tanner Price, 2-point pass failed	21	19
"TOP" = time of possession. For other American football terms, see Glossary of American football.							21	19

=== @ Baylor ===
Louisiana–Monroe @ Baylor

Team	1	2	3	4	Total
Warhawks	0	7	0	0	7
• #19 Bears	35	14	21	0	70

- Date: September 21
- Location: Floyd Casey Stadium
  Waco, Texas
- Game start: 3:00 p.m. CDT
- Elapsed time: 3:32
- Game attendance: 42,967
- Game weather: Temperature: 81 • Wind: NE-15 • Weather: Sunny Skies
- Referee: Jeff Hilyer
- TV announcers (FS1): Craig Bolerjack (pxp), Joey Harrington (analyst), Ryan Nece (sideline)

In their fourth game of the season, the Warhawks lost, 70–7 to the Baylor Bears.

Scoring summary

Quarter	Time	Drive			Team	Scoring information	Score	
Quarter	Time	Plays	Yards	TOP	Team	Scoring information	Louisiana–Monroe	Baylor
1	10:17	3	82	0:21	Baylor	Antwan Goodley 63-yard touchdown reception from Bryce Petty, Aaron Jones kick good	0	7
1	8:53	4	75	0:51	Baylor	Tevin Reese 47-yard touchdown reception from Bryce Petty, Aaron Jones kick good	0	14
1	7:50				Baylor	Interception returned 41 yards for touchdown by Joe Williams, Aaron Jones kick good	0	21
1	2:34				Baylor	Interception returned 63 yards for touchdown by Terrell Burt, Aaron Jones kick good	0	28
1	2:13	2	16	0:21	Baylor	Bryce Petty 2-yard touchdown run, Aaron Jones kick good	0	35
2	13:10	5	83	1:08	Baylor	Antwan Goodley 65-yard touchdown reception from Bryce Petty, Aaron Jones kick good	0	42
2	5:52	11	80	3:53	Louisiana–Monroe	Harley Scioneaux 9-yard touchdown reception from Kolton Browning, Justin Manton kick good	7	42
2	3:56	8	75	1:56	Baylor	Clay Fuller 23-yard touchdown reception from Bryce Petty, Aaron Jones kick good	7	49
3	14:43	2	75	0:17	Baylor	Lache Seastrunk 75-yard touchdown run, Aaron Jones kick good	7	56
3	11:58	5	78	1:18	Baylor	Shock Linwood 10-yard touchdown run, Aaron Jones kick good	7	63
3	7:51	5	80	1:13	Baylor	Levi Norwood 65-yard touchdown reception from Seth Russell, Aaron Jones kick good	7	70
"TOP" = time of possession. For other American football terms, see Glossary of American football.							7	70

=== Tulane ===
Tulane @ Louisiana–Monroe

Team	1	2	3	4	Total
• Green Wave	3	7	21	0	31
Warhawks	0	0	7	7	14

- Date: September 28
- Location: Malone Stadium
  Monroe, Louisiana
- Game start: 6:00 p.m. CDT
- Elapsed time: 3:11
- Game attendance: 20,476
- Game weather: Temperature: 87 • Wind: SE 8 • Weather: Mostly clear
- Referee: Charles Lewis
- Television network: ESPN3

In their fifth game of the season, the Warhawks lost, 31–14 to the Tulane Green Wave.

Scoring summary

Quarter	Time	Drive			Team	Scoring information	Score	
Quarter	Time	Plays	Yards	TOP	Team	Scoring information	Tulane	Louisiana–Monroe
1	7:59	12	37	4:54	Tulane	56-yard field goal by Cairo Santos	3	0
2	2:07	7	48	2:40	Tulane	Rob Kelley 7-yard touchdown run, Cairo Santos kick good	10	0
3	13:06	5	75	1:54	Tulane	Orleans Darkwa 1-yard touchdown run, Cairo Santos kick good	17	0
3	11:27				Tulane	Fumble recovery returned 33 yards for touchdown by Dominique Robertson, Cairo Santos kick good	24	0
3	8:28	1	88		Louisiana–Monroe	Rashon Ceaser 88-yard punt return, Justin Manton kick good	24	7
3	5:28	2	26	0:48	Tulane	Ryan Grant 26-yard touchdown reception from Nick Montana, Cairo Santos kick good	31	7
4	7:45	9	88	3:44	Louisiana–Monroe	Ajalen Holley 25-yard touchdown reception from Brayle Brown, Justin Manton kick good	31	14
"TOP" = time of possession. For other American football terms, see Glossary of American football.							31	14

- Starting Quarterback, Kolton Browning, was injured in this game and will be out for the season.

=== WKU ===
WKU @ Louisiana–Monroe

Team	1	2	3	4	Total
• Hilltoppers	14	0	10	7	31
Warhawks	7	3	0	0	10

- Date: October 3
- Location: Malone Stadium
  Monroe, Louisiana
- Game start: 6:30 p.m. CDT
- Elapsed time: 3:21
- Game attendance: 16,317
- Game weather: Temperature: 86 • Wind: S 6 mph • Weather: Mostly Clear
- Referee: Kevin Stine
- Television network: ESPNU

In their sixth game of the season, the Warhawks lost, 31–10 to the WKU Hilltopers.

Scoring summary

Quarter	Time	Drive			Team	Scoring information	Score	
Quarter	Time	Plays	Yards	TOP	Team	Scoring information	WKU	Louisiana–Monroe
1	12:13	6	75	2:47	WKU	Willie McNeal 33-yard touchdown reception from Brandon Doughty, Garrett Schwettman kick good	7	0
1	3:07	9	71	4:43	WKU	Leon Allen 17-yard touchdown reception from Brandon Doughty, Garrett Schwettman kick good	14	0
1	0:33	7	84	2:34	Louisiana–Monroe	Jyruss Edwards 1-yard touchdown run, Justin Manton kick good	14	7
2	9:19	11	83	5:15	Louisiana–Monroe	34-yard field goal by Justin Manton	14	10
3	9:50	7	80	3:14	WKU	Antonio Andrews 6-yard touchdown run, Garrett Schwettman kick good	21	10
3	5:16	8	41	2:51	WKU	22-yard field goal by Garrett Schwettman	24	10
4	10:17	14	89	5:05	WKU	Leon Allen 5-yard touchdown run, Garrett Schwettman kick good	31	10
"TOP" = time of possession. For other American football terms, see Glossary of American football.							31	10

- Quarterback Blale Brown made his first start as a ULM Warhawks.

=== @ Texas State ===
Louisiana–Monroe @ Texas State

Team	1	2	3	4	Total
• Warhawks	7	0	7	7	21
Bobcats	0	0	6	8	14

- Date: October 12
- Location: Bobcat Stadium·San Marcos, Texas
- Game start: 6:00 p.m. CDT
- Game attendance: 15,210
- Referee: Tony Backert
- Television network: Longhorn Network

In their seventh game of the season, the Warhawks won, 21–14 over the Texas State Bobcats.

Scoring summary

Quarter	Time	Drive			Team	Scoring information	Score	
Quarter	Time	Plays	Yards	TOP	Team	Scoring information	Louisiana–Monroe	Texas State
1	6:09				Louisiana–Monroe	Interception returned 71 yards for touchdown by Isaiah Newsome, Justin Manton kick good	7	0
3	11:07				Louisiana–Monroe	Interception returned 75 yards for touchdown by Isaiah Newsome, Justin Manton kick good	14	0
3	5:50	4	4	0:55	Texas State	22-yard field goal by Jason Dann	14	3
3	0:18	9	64	3:52	Texas State	43-yard field goal by Jason Dann	14	6
4	6:01	1	21	0:12	Texas State	Robert Lowe 6-yard touchdown run, 2-point pass good	14	14
4	0:18	10	75	2:38	Louisiana–Monroe	Centarius Donald 10-yard touchdown run, Justin Manton kick good	21	14
"TOP" = time of possession. For other American football terms, see Glossary of American football.							21	14

=== Georgia State ===
Georgia State @ Louisiana–Monroe

Team	1	2	3	4	Total
Panthers	0	10	0	0	10
• Warhawks	14	14	10	0	38

- Date: October 26
- Location: Malone Stadium
  Monroe, Louisiana
- Game start: 6:00 p.m. CDT
- Elapsed time: 3:09
- Game attendance: 11,357
- Game weather: Temperature: 70 • Wind: Calm • Weather: Partly Cloudy
- Referee: Kevin Stine
- Television network: ESPN3

In their eighth game of the season, the Warhawks won, 38–10 over the Georgia State Panthers.

Scoring summary

Quarter	Time	Drive			Team	Scoring information	Score	
Quarter	Time	Plays	Yards	TOP	Team	Scoring information	Georgia State	Louisiana–Monroe
1	9:10	4	83	1:53	Louisiana–Monroe	Tony Cook 4-yard touchdown reception from Kolton Browning, Justin Manton kick good	0	7
1	4:00	2	33	0:20	Louisiana–Monroe	Ajalen Holley 7-yard touchdown reception from Kolton Browning, Justin Manton kick good	0	14
2	11:31				Georgia State	Fumble recovery returned 88 yards for touchdown by Robert Ferguson, Wil Lutz kick good	7	14
2	7:01	9	79	2:49	Georgia State	25-yard field goal by Wil Lutz	10	14
2	5:21	3	31	0:41	Louisiana–Monroe	Je'Ron Hamm 19-yard touchdown reception from Kolton Browning, Justin Manton kick good	10	21
2	1:00	11	73	2:54	Louisiana–Monroe	Centarius Donald 1-yard touchdown run, Justin Manton kick good	10	28
3	9:51	8	37	3:14	Louisiana–Monroe	36-yard field goal by Justin Manton	10	31
3	1:58	8	73	3:17	Louisiana–Monroe	Harley Scioneaux 24-yard touchdown reception from Kolton Browning, Justin Manton kick good	10	38
"TOP" = time of possession. For other American football terms, see Glossary of American football.							10	38

=== @ Troy ===
Louisiana–Monroe @ Troy

Team	1	2	3	4	Total
• Warhawks	14	7	21	7	49
Trojans	0	17	6	14	37

- Date: October 31
- Location: Veterans Memorial Stadium
  Troy, Alabama
- Game start: 6:30 p.m. CDT
- Elapsed time: 3:36
- Game attendance: 17,013
- Game weather: Temperature: 73 • Wind: 13 North • Weather: Overcast
- Referee: Perry Havener
- Television network: ESPNU

In their ninth game of the season, the Warhawks won, 49–37 over the Troy Trojans.

Scoring summary

Quarter	Time	Drive			Team	Scoring information	Score	
Quarter	Time	Plays	Yards	TOP	Team	Scoring information	Louisiana–Monroe	Troy
1	7:12	6	71	1:59	Louisiana–Monroe	Ajalen Holley 60-yard touchdown reception from Kolton Browning, Justin Manton kick good	7	0
1	1:15	2	9	0:21	Louisiana–Monroe	Centarius Donald 3-yard touchdown run, Justin Manton kick good	14	0
2	10:00	3	33	0:57	Troy	Wilson Van Hooser 21-yard touchdown reception from Corey Robinson, Will Scott kick good	14	7
2	5:41	9	75	4:19	Louisiana–Monroe	Ajalen Holley 6-yard touchdown reception from Kolton Browning, Justin Manton kick good	21	7
2	1:59	1	11		Troy	K.D. Edenfield 11-yard blocked punt return, Will Scott kick good	21	14
2	0:03	6	38	0:46	Troy	43-yard field goal by Will Scott	21	17
3	12:02	7	75	2:58	Louisiana–Monroe	Tre' Perrier 23-yard touchdown reception from Kolton Browning, Justin Manton kick good	28	17
3	8:38	4	88	2:02	Louisiana–Monroe	Rashon Ceaser 55-yard touchdown reception from Kolton Browning, Justin Manton kick good	35	17
3	5:16	8	88	3:22	Troy	Bryan Holmes 55-yard touchdown reception from Corey Robinson, Will Scott kick blocked	35	23
3	0:44	11	75	4:32	Louisiana–Monroe	Kolton Browning 1-yard touchdown run, Justin Manton kick good	42	23
4	10:56	14	75	4:48	Troy	Jordan Chunn 2-yard touchdown run, Will Scott kick good	42	30
4	6:00	8	53	2:25	Troy	Corey Robinson 3-yard touchdown run, Will Scott kick good	42	37
4	3:01	6	68	2:59	Louisiana–Monroe	Tre' Perrier 29-yard touchdown reception from Kolton Browning, Justin Manton kick good	49	37
"TOP" = time of possession. For other American football terms, see Glossary of American football.							49	37

=== Arkansas State ===
Arkansas State @ Louisiana–Monroe

Team	1	2	3	4	Total
• Red Wolves	7	7	14	14	42
Warhawks	7	7	0	0	14

- Date: November 9
- Location: Malone Stadium
  Monroe, Louisiana
- Game start: 6:00 p.m. CST
- Elapsed time: 3:04
- Game attendance: 13,427
- Game weather: Temperature: 52 • Wind: Calm • Weather: Cloudy, light rain
- Referee: Charles Lewis
- Television network: ESPN3

In their tenth game of the season, the Warhawks lost, 42–14 to the Arkansas State Red Wolves.

Scoring summary

Quarter	Time	Drive			Team	Scoring information	Score	
Quarter	Time	Plays	Yards	TOP	Team	Scoring information	Arkansas State	Louisiana–Monroe
1	0:49	9	91	3:33	Arkansas State	Michael Gordon 51-yard touchdown reception from Adam Kennedy, Brian Davis kick good	7	0
1	0:00	2	71	0:49	Louisiana–Monroe	Rashon Ceaser 59-yard touchdown reception from Kolton Browning, Justin Manton kick good	7	7
2	14:18	2	50	0:42	Arkansas State	Michael Gordon 1-yard touchdown run, Brian Davis kick good	14	7
2	0:08	10	90	1:46	Louisiana–Monroe	Rashon Ceaser 10-yard touchdown reception from Kolton Browning, Justin Manton kick good	14	14
3	8:00	5	36	1:37	Arkansas State	Michael Gordon 1-yard touchdown run, Brian Davis kick good	21	14
3	1:40	5	75	2:18	Arkansas State	Adam Kennedy 8-yard touchdown run, Brian Davis kick good	28	14
4	9:26	2	2	0:52	Arkansas State	Adam Kennedy 4-yard touchdown run, Brian Davis kick good	35	14
4	4:40	10	31	4:33	Arkansas State	Michael Gordon 8-yard touchdown run, Brian Davis kick good	42	14
"TOP" = time of possession. For other American football terms, see Glossary of American football.							42	14

=== @ South Alabama ===
Louisiana–Monroe @ South Alabama

Team	1	2	3	4	Total
Warhawks	0	7	7	0	14
• Jaguars	6	13	7	10	36

- Date: November 23
- Location: Ladd–Peebles Stadium
  Mobile, Alabama
- Game start: 6:00 p.m. CST
- Elapsed time: 3:06
- Game attendance: 13,891
- Game weather: Temperature: 53 • Weather: Cloudy
- Referee: Perry Havener
- Television network: Sun Belt Network

In their eleventh game of the season, the Warhawks lost, 36–14 to the South Alabama Jaguars.

Scoring summary

Quarter	Time	Drive			Team	Scoring information	Score	
Quarter	Time	Plays	Yards	TOP	Team	Scoring information	Louisiana–Monroe	South Alabama
1	6:38	8	48	1:40	South Alabama	43-yard field goal by Aleem Sunanon	0	3
1	3:07	6	50	1:59	South Alabama	45-yard field goal by Aleem Sunanon	0	6
2	12:23	11	80	5:40	Louisiana–Monroe	Kolton Browning 6-yard touchdown run, Justin Manton kick good	7	6
2	9:13	9	75	3:10	South Alabama	Shavarez Smith 29-yard touchdown reception from Ross Metheny, 2-point run failed	7	12
2	0:15	9	85	3:16	South Alabama	Jereme Jones 5-yard touchdown reception from Ross Metheny, Aleem Sunanon kick good	7	19
3	10:07	6	55	2:48	Louisiana–Monroe	Rashon Ceaser 44-yard touchdown reception from Kolton Browning, Justin Manton kick good	14	19
3	5:58	11	75	4:09	South Alabama	Ryan Onkka 2-yard touchdown reception from Ross Metheny, Aleem Sunanon kick good	14	26
4	13:33	13	63	5:25	South Alabama	34-yard field goal by Aleem Sunanon	14	29
4	3:30	2	65	0:18	South Alabama	Ross Metheny 63-yard touchdown run, Aleem Sunanon kick good	14	36
"TOP" = time of possession. For other American football terms, see Glossary of American football.							14	36

=== @ Louisiana–Lafayette ===
Louisiana–Monroe @ Louisiana–Lafayette

Team	1	2	3	4	Total
• Warhawks	7	7	14	3	31
Rajun' Cajuns	14	7	0	7	28

- Date: November 30
- Location: Cajun Field
  Lafayette, Louisiana
- Game start: 6:00 p.m. CST
- Elapsed time: 3:12
- Game attendance: 25,309
- Game weather: Temperature: 56 • Wind: Variable • Weather: Clear
- Referee: Tony Backert
- Television network: Sun Belt Network

In their twelfth game of the season, the Warhawks won, 31–28 over the Louisiana–Lafayette Ragin' Cajuns.

Scoring summary

Quarter	Time	Drive			Team	Scoring information	Score	
Quarter	Time	Plays	Yards	TOP	Team	Scoring information	Louisiana–Monroe	Louisiana–Lafayette
1	9:59	9	68	5:01	Louisiana–Lafayette	Terrance Broadway 2-yard touchdown run, Stephen Brauchle kick good	0	7
1	5:50	5	35	1:57	Louisiana–Lafayette	Elijah McGuire 3-yard touchdown run, Stephen Brauchle kick good	0	14
1	0:38	8	76	5:12	Louisiana–Monroe	Ajalen Holley 29-yard touchdown reception from Kolton Browning, Justin Manton kick good	7	14
2	10:01	3	86	1:36	Louisiana–Monroe	DeVontae McNeal 77-yard touchdown run, Justin Manton kick good	14	14
2	6:57	6	50	3:04	Louisiana–Lafayette	Darryl Surgent 24-yard touchdown reception from Terrance Broadway, Stephen Brauchle kick good	14	21
3	10:01	11	86	4:59	Louisiana–Monroe	Rashon Ceaser 16-yard touchdown reception from Kolton Browning, Justin Manton kick failed	20	21
3	2:23	12	80	4:39	Louisiana–Monroe	Centarius Donald 4-yard touchdown run, 2-point pass good	28	21
4	13:39	8	49	2:26	Louisiana–Monroe	28-yard field goal by Justin Manton	31	21
4	0:53	8	80	1:44	Louisiana–Lafayette	Jamal Robinson 25-yard touchdown reception from Brooks Haack, Stephen Brauchle kick good	31	28
"TOP" = time of possession. For other American football terms, see Glossary of American football.							31	28

== Statistics ==
As of the end of the 2013 football season

=== Team ===
	ULM	Opp
Scoring	267	362
Points per Game	22.2	30.2
First downs	212	255
Rushing	75	113
Passing	117	127
Penalty	20	15
Total Offense	4324	5122
Avg per Play	5.0	5.8
Avg per Game	360.3	426.8
Fumbles-Lost	14–9	19–6
Penalties-Yards	61–503	93–860
Avg per Game	41.0–9.0	71.0–7.0

	ULM	Opp
Punts-Yards	82-3668	75-3221
Avg per Punt	44.7	42.9
Net Punt Avg	39.1	39.9
Time of Possession/Game	29:22	30:38
3rd Down Conversions	77/203 – 38%	74/184 – 40%
4th Down Conversions	6/20 – 30%	4/12 – 33%
Touchdowns Scored	36	46
Field goals-Attempts	5–9	14–17
PAT-Attempts	34–35 – 97%	42–44 – 95%
Attendance	85,177	225,806
Games/Avg per Game	5/17,035	7/32,258

==== Score by quarters ====
	1	2	3	4	OT	Total
Warhawks	84	73	80	30	0	267
Opponents	93	94	106	69	0	362

=== Offense ===
==== Rushing ====
Name	GP-GS	Att	Gain	Loss	Net	Avg	TD	Long	Avg/G
Tyler Cain	0–0	0	0	0	0	0.0	0	0	0.0
Cortney Davis	8–1	7	9	5	4	0.6	0	3	0.5
Centarius Donald	0–0	0	0	0	0	0.0	0	0	0.0
Jyruss Edwards	0–0	0	0	0	0	0.0	0	0	0.0
Tevin Horton	0–0	0	0	0	0	0.0	0	0	0.0
DeVontae McNeal	0–0	0	0	0	0	0.0	0	0	0.0
Nathan Meadors, Jr.	0–0	0	0	0	0	0.0	0	0	0.0
Monterrell Washington	1–1	0	0	0	0	0.0	0	0	0.0
TEAM	1–0	0	0	0	0	0.0	0	0	0.0
Kolton Browning	1–1*	0	0	0	0	0.0	0	0	0.0
Total	0	0	0	0	0	0	0	0	0.0

==== Passing ====
Name	GP-GS	Effic	Att-Cmp-Int	Pct	Yds	TD	Lng	Avg/G
Kolton Browning	10–10	124.0	200–352–8	56.8	2179	21	60	217.9
Brayle Brown	12–2	91.0	61–117–6	52.1	645	1	69	53.8
Ajalen Holley	12–4	318.4	1–1–0	100.0	26	0	26	2.2
Justin Manton	12–0	0.0	0–1–0	0.0	0	0	0	0.0
Total	12	115.9	262–417–14	55.6	2850	22	69	237.5

==== Receiving ====
Name	GP-GS	No.	Yds	Avg	TD	Long	Avg/G
Rashon Ceaser	0–0	0	0	0.0	0	0	0.0
Tony Cook	0–0	0	0	0.0	0	0	0.0
Caleb Gammel	0–0	0	0	0.0	0	0	0.0
De'Vonte Haggerty	0–0	0	0	0.0	0	0	0.0
Je'Ron Hamm	0–0	0	0	0.0	0	0	0.0
Colby Harper	0–0	0	0	0.0	0	0	0.0
Ajalen Holley	0–0	0	0	0.0	0	0	0.0
Kenzee Jackson	0–0	0	0	0.0	0	0	0.0
Tavarese Maye	0–0	0	0	0.0	0	0	0.0
Tre' Perrier	0–0	0	0	0.0	0	0	0.0
Wes Davis	0–0	0	0	0.0	0	0	0.0
Nick Jones	0–0	0	0	0.0	0	0	0.0
Alec Osborne	0–0	0	0	0.0	0	0	0.0
Harley Scioneaux	0–0	0	0	0.0	0	0	0.0
Kevin Steed	0–0	0	0	0.0	0	0	0.0
Total	0	0	0	0.0	0	0	0.0

=== Defense ===
Name	GP-GS	Tackles				Sacks	Pass defense			Fumbles		Blkd Kick	Saf
Name	GP-GS	Solo	Ast	Total	TFL-Yds	No-Yds	Int-Yds	BrUp	QBH	Rcv-Yds	FF	Blkd Kick	Saf
Justin Backus	0–0	0	0	0	0.0–	0.0–0	0–0	0	0	0–0	0	0	0
Felix Blade	0–0	0	0	0	0.0–	0.0–0	0–0	0	0	0–0	0	0	0
Preston Coleman	0–0	0	0	0	0.0–	0.0–0	0–0	0	0	0–0	0	0	0
Tre' Hunter	0–0	0	0	0	0.0–	0.0–0	0–0	0	0	0–0	0	0	0
Alex Johnson	0–0	0	0	0	0.0–	0.0–0	0–0	0	0	0–0	0	0	0
Ferrando Joseph	0–0	0	0	0	0.0–	0.0–0	0–0	0	0	0–0	0	0	0
Mitch Lane	0–0	0	0	0	0.0–	0.0–0	0–0	0	0	0–0	0	0	0
Isaiah Newsome	0–0	0	0	0	0.0–	0.0–0	0–0	0	0	0–0	0	0	0
Lenzy Pipkins	0–0	0	0	0	0.0–	0.0–0	0–0	0	0	0–0	0	0	0
Cordero Smith	0–0	0	0	0	0.0–	0.0–0	0–0	0	0	0–0	0	0	0
Roland Veal	0–0	0	0	0	0.0–	0.0–0	0–0	0	0	0–0	0	0	0
Trey Caldwell	0–0	0	0	0	0.0–	0.0–0	0–0	0	0	0–0	0	0	0
Corey Davis	0–0	0	0	0	0.0–	0.0–0	0–0	0	0	0–0	0	0	0
Vincent Eddie	0–0	0	0	0	0.0–	0.0–0	0–0	0	0	0–0	0	0	0
Rob'Donovan Lewis	0–0	0	0	0	0.0–	0.0–0	0–0	0	0	0–0	0	0	0
Grant Dotsy	0–0	0	0	0	0.0–	0.0–0	0–0	0	0	0–0	0	0	0
Roland Jenkins	0–0	0	0	0	0.0–	0.0–0	0–0	0	0	0–0	0	0	0
Marquis McCullum	0–0	0	0	0	0.0–	0.0–0	0–0	0	0	0–0	0	0	0
Cameron Blakes	0–0	0	0	0	0.0–	0.0–0	0–0	0	0	0–0	0	0	0
Tevyn Cagins	0–0	0	0	0	0.0–	0.0–0	0–0	0	0	0–0	0	0	0
Jarred Dunn	0–0	0	0	0	0.0–	0.0–0	0–0	0	0	0–0	0	0	0
Michael Johnson	0–0	0	0	0	0.0–	0.0–0	0–0	0	0	0–0	0	0	0
Hunter Kissinger	0–0	0	0	0	0.0–	0.0–0	0–0	0	0	0–0	0	0	0
Braxton Moore	0–0	0	0	0	0.0–	0.0–0	0–0	0	0	0–0	0	0	0
Austin Moss	0–0	0	0	0	0.0–	0.0–0	0–0	0	0	0–0	0	0	0
Cody Robinson	0–0	0	0	0	0.0–	0.0–0	0–0	0	0	0–0	0	0	0
Brandon Savone	0–0	0	0	0	0.0–	0.0–0	0–0	0	0	0–0	0	0	0
Ray Stovall	0–0	0	0	0	0.0–	0.0–0	0–0	0	0	0–0	0	0	0
Kentarius Caldwell	0–0	0	0	0	0.0–	0.0–0	0–0	0	0	0–0	0	0	0
Elliot Hilliard	0–0	0	0	0	0.0–	0.0–0	0–0	0	0	0–0	0	0	0
Gerrand Johnson	0–0	0	0	0	0.0–	0.0–0	0–0	0	0	0–0	0	0	0
Malcolm Edmond	0–0	0	0	0	0.0–	0.0–0	0–0	0	0	0–0	0	0	0
Joey Gautney	0–0	0	0	0	0.0–	0.0–0	0–0	0	0	0–0	0	0	0
Lorenzo Jackson	0–0	0	0	0	0.0–	0.0–0	0–0	0	0	0–0	0	0	0
Emanuel Jefferies	0–0	0	0	0	0.0–	0.0–0	0–0	0	0	0–0	0	0	0
Darius Lively	0–0	0	0	0	0.0–	0.0–0	0–0	0	0	0–0	0	0	0
Jackson Randle	0–0	0	0	0	0.0–	0.0–0	0–0	0	0	0–0	0	0	0
Diontre Thomas	0–0	0	0	0	0.0–	0.0–0	0–0	0	0	0–0	0	0	0
Jacob Tyson	0–0	0	0	0	0.0–	0.0–0	0–0	0	0	0–0	0	0	0
Everett Anderson	0–0	0	0	0	0.0–	0.0–0	0–0	0	0	0–0	0	0	0
Trey Lamastus	0–0	0	0	0	0.0–	0.0–0	0–0	0	0	0–0	0	0	0
Madison Tharp	0–0	0	0	0	0.0–	0.0–0	0–0	0	0	0–0	0	0	0
Total	0	0	0	0	0–0	0–0	0–0	0	0	0–0	0	0	0

=== Special teams ===
Name	Punting									Kickoffs				
Name	No.	Yds	Avg	Long	TB	FC	i20	50+	Blkd	No.	Yds	Avg	TB	OB
Justin Manton	0	0	0.0	0	0	0	0	0	0	0	0	0.0	0	0
Alex Crist	0	0	0.0	0	0	0	0	0	0	0	0	0.0	0	0
Caleb Gammel	0	0	0.0	0	0	0	0	0	0					
Brandon Menard										0	0	0.0	0	0
Total	0	0	0.0	0	0	0	0	0	0	0	0	0.0	0	0

Name	Punt returns					Kick returns				
Name	No.	Yds	Avg	TD	Long	No.	Yds	Avg	TD	Long
Rashon Ceaser	0	0	0.0	0	0					
Kenzee Jackson	0	0	0.0	0	0					
Vincent Eddie	0	0	0.0	0	0					
Cortney Davis						0	0	0.0	0	0
Jyruss Edwards						0	0	0.0	0	0
Tyler Cain						0	0	0.0	0	0
Total	0	0	0.0	0	0	0	0	0.0	0	0
