= 2013 Sun Belt Conference football season =

- League: NCAA Division I FBS (Football Bowl Subdivision)
- Sport: football
- Duration: August 31, 2013–January 5, 2014
- Teams: 8
- TV partner(s): ESPN, CSS/CST

2014 NFL Draft
- Top draft pick: DT Ryan Carrethers, Arkansas State
- Picked by: San Diego Chargers, 165th overall

Regular season
- Season champions: Louisiana-Lafayette & Arkansas State
- Runners-up: WKU, Troy, Louisiana-Monroe, South Alabama
- Season MVP: Antonio Andrews
- Top scorer: Antonio Andrews (96 points)

Football seasons
- ← 2012 2014 →

2013 Sun Belt Conference football standings
	Conf.			Overall
Team	W		L	W		L
Arkansas State $	5	–	2	8	–	5
Western Kentucky	4	–	3	8	–	4
South Alabama	4	–	3	6	–	6
Troy	4	–	3	6	–	6
Louisiana–Monroe	4	–	3	6	–	6
Texas State	2	–	5	6	–	6
Louisiana–Lafayette *	0	–	2	1	–	4
Georgia State **	0	–	7	0	–	12
$ – Conference champion; * – Louisiana–Lafayette vacated eight wins due to NCAA violations ** – Georgia State ineligible for postseason play due to FCS-to-FBS transition rules

The 2013 Sun Belt Conference football season was the 13th college football season for the Sun Belt Conference. During the 2013 season, Sun Belt football consisted of eight members: Arkansas State, Georgia State, Louisiana–Lafayette, Louisiana–Monroe, South Alabama, Texas State, Troy, and Western Kentucky.

The departure of Florida Atlantic and Florida International left the league at 8 teams for the first time since 2008, although the league would be back up to 11 teams by the next season.

This was the first season for two teams in Sun Belt football; and the final season of Sun Belt play for a third. Georgia State was one of the six charter members of the Sun Belt Conference in 1976, but left the league in 1981, 20 years before the conference began sponsoring football in 2001 and nearly 30 years before the school started its football program in 2010. The Panthers returned to the Sun Belt in 2013 during a major wave of realignment that dramatically affected the conference. Also joining the Sun Belt in 2013 was Texas State, which left the WAC after only one season in that league. WKU was in its last season of Sun Belt play, as it joined Conference USA in 2014.

Due to NCAA transitional rules, Georgia State, coming from the FCS Colonial Athletic Association, was not eligible for a conference championship or postseason play. South Alabama and Texas State, which both began transitions from FCS in 2011, were now eligible for postseason play and a conference championship.

== Preseason ==
=== Award watch lists ===
The following Sun Belt players were named to preseason award watch lists:

Walter Camp Award:

- Antonio Andrews – WKU
- Kolton Browning – Louisiana-Monroe

Doak Walker Award:

- Antonio Andrews – WKU
- David Oku – Arkansas State

Davey O'Brien Award:

- Kolton Browning – Louisiana-Monroe
- Terrance Broadway – Louisiana–Lafayette

Outland Trophy:

- Ryan Carrethers – Arkansas State

Bronko Nagurski Trophy:

- Andrew Jackson – Western Kentucky

Lou Groza Award:

- Brian Davis – Arkansas State
- Will Scott – Troy

Rimington Trophy:

- Andre Huval – Louisiana-Lafayette
- Bryce Giddens – Arkansas State
- Sean Conway – WKU

Bednarik Award:

- Ryan Carrethers – Arkansas State
- Andrew Jackson – WKU

Paul Hornung Award:

- Antonio Andrews – WKU

=== Sun Belt Media Day ===
- Sun Belt Conference Media Days was held on July 15, 2013 in the Mercedes-Benz Superdome in New Orleans, Louisiana.
- Pre-Season Offensive Player of the Year - Kolton Browning (QB, Louisiana-Monroe)
- Pre-Season Defensive Player of the Year - Andrew Jackson (LB, WKU)

==== Coaches Poll ====
1. Louisiana-Lafayette - 57 (4)
2. Louisiana-Monroe - 57 (2)
3. Arkansas State - 45 (2)
4. WKU - 44
5. Troy - 35
6. Texas State - 23
7. South Alabama - 19
8. Georgia State -8

Louisiana-Lafayette & ULM tied for conference pre-season champions. Louisiana-Lafayette is listed as #1 because of 1st place votes.

==== Preseason All–Conference Team ====
Offense

QB Kolton Browning (Louisiana-Monroe)
RB David Oku (Arkansas State)
RB Antonio Andrews (WKU)
WR J. D. McKissic (Arkansas State)
WR Je’Ron Hamm (Louisiana-Monroe)
WR Eric Thomas (Troy)
TE Wes Saxton (South Alabama)
OL Bryce Giddens (Arkansas State)
OL Andre Huval (Louisiana-Lafayette)
OL Josh Allen (Louisiana-Monroe)
OL Terrence Jones (Troy)
OL Sean Conway (WKU)

Defense

DL Ryan Carrethers (Arkansas State)
DL Christian Ringo (Louisiana-Lafayette)
DL Kentarius Caldwell (Louisiana-Monroe)
DL Alex Page (South Alabama)
LB Qushaun Lee (Arkansas State)
LB Justin Anderson (Louisiana-Lafayette)
LB Andrew Jackson (WKU)
DB Sterling Young (Arkansas State)
DB Isaiah Newsome (Louisiana-Monroe)
DB Tyrell Pearson (South Alabama)
DB Jonathan Dowling (WKU)

Specialists

K Brian Davis (Arkansas State)
P Will Scott (Troy)
RS Antonio Andrews (WKU)

== Coaches ==
NOTE: Stats shown are before the beginning of the season

Team	Head coach	Years at school	Overall record	Record at school	Sun Belt record
Arkansas State	Bryan Harsin	1	0–0	0–0	0–0
Georgia State	Trent Miles	1	20–36	0–0	0–0
Louisiana–Lafayette	Mark Hudspeth	3	84–29	18-8	12-4
Louisiana–Monroe	Todd Berry	4	46–79	17-20	13-11
South Alabama	Joey Jones	4	28–21	25–14	1-7
Troy	Larry Blakeney	24	168-99-1	168-99-1	45-22
Texas State	Dennis Franchione	5	197-115-2	23-23	0-0
WKU	Bobby Petrino	1	75-26	0-0	0-0

== Sun Belt vs. BCS AQ Conference matchups ==
Date	Visitor	Home	Conference	Score	Notes
August 31	Louisiana-Monroe	#16 Oklahoma	Big 12	L 0-34	
August 31	Louisiana-Lafayette	Arkansas	SEC	L 14-34	
August 31	Kentucky	Western Kentucky	SEC	W 35-26	Game played at LP Field in Nashville
September 7	Arkansas State	Auburn	SEC	L 9-38	
September 7	Louisiana-Lafayette	Kansas State	Big 12	L 27-48	
September 7	Western Kentucky	Tennessee	SEC	L 20-52	
September 14	Georgia State	West Virginia	Big 12	L 7-41	
September 14	Louisiana-Monroe	Wake Forest	ACC	W 21-19	
September 21	Arkansas State	Memphis	American	L 7-31	
September 21	Louisiana-Monroe	#20 Baylor	Big 12	L 7-70	
September 21	Texas State	#25 Texas Tech	Big 12	L 7-33	
September 21	Troy	Mississippi State	SEC	L 7-62	
September 28	Arkansas State	Missouri	SEC	L 19-41	
September 28	South Alabama	Tennessee	SEC	L 24-31	
September 28	Troy	Duke	ACC	L 31-38	
October 1	Georgia State	Alabama	SEC	L 3-45	
November 6	Troy	Ole Miss	SEC	L 21-51	

== Regular season ==
Index to colors and formatting
Sun Belt member won
Sun Belt member lost
Sun Belt teams in **bold**

All dates, times, and TV are tentative and subject to change.

All Sun Belt teams are located in the Central Time Zone except for Georgia State, which is in the Eastern Time Zone. Start times for non-conference games are local for the Sun Belt team; for conference games, starting times are local for the home team.

Rankings reflect that of the USA Today Coaches poll for that week until week eight when the BCS poll will be used.

=== Week 1 ===
Date	Time	Visiting team	Home team	Site	TV	Result	Attendance
August 29	6:30 p.m.	Southern Utah	**South Alabama**	Ladd–Peebles Stadium • Mobile, AL	ESPN3	L 21–22	15,240
August 30	6:00 p.m.	Samford	**Georgia State**	Georgia Dome • Atlanta, GA	ESPN3	L 21–31	17,606
August 31	3:00 p.m.	**Louisiana-Lafayette**	Arkansas	Donald W. Reynolds Razorback Stadium • Fayetteville, AR	FSN	L 14–34	69,801
August 31	6:00 p.m.	**Texas State**	Southern Miss	M.M. Roberts Stadium • Hattiesburg, MS		W 22–15	25,729
August 31	6:00 p.m.	UAB	**Troy**	Veterans Memorial Stadium • Troy, AL	ESPN3	W 34–31 (OT)	21,398
August 31	6:00 p.m.	**Louisiana-Monroe**	#16 Oklahoma	Gaylord Family Oklahoma Memorial Stadium • Norman, OK	FSN PPV	L 0–34	84,991
August 31	6:00 p.m.	Kentucky	**Western Kentucky**	LP Field • Nashville, TN	ESPNews	W 35–26	46,723
August 31	6:00 p.m.	Arkansas-Pine Bluff	**Arkansas State**	Liberty Bank Stadium • Jonesboro, AR	ESPN3	W 62–11	30,451

Players of the Week

Offensive		Defensive		Special teams	
Player	Team	Player	Team	Player	Team
Corey Robinson	Troy	David Mayo	Texas State	Will Scott	Troy

=== Week 2 ===
Date	Time	Visiting team	Home team	Site	TV	Result	Attendance
September 7	11:21 a.m.	**Western Kentucky**	Tennessee	Neyland Stadium • Knoxville, TN	SEC Network	L 20-52	86,783
September 7	1:00 p.m.	Chattanooga	**Georgia State**	Georgia Dome • Atlanta, GA	ESPN3	L 14-42	14,952
September 7	2:30 p.m.	**South Alabama**	Tulane	Mercedes-Benz Superdome • New Orleans, LA	CST	W 41-39	19,414
September 7	5:30 p.m.	**Louisiana-Lafayette**	Kansas State	Bill Snyder Family Football Stadium • Manhattan, KS	FS1	L 27-48	53,073
September 7	6:00 p.m.	Prairie View A&M	**Texas State**	Bobcat Stadium • San Marcos, TX	ESPN3	W 28-3	20,136
September 7	6:00 p.m.	Grambling State	**Louisiana-Monroe**	Malone Stadium • Monroe, LA	ESPN3	W 48-14	23,600
September 7	6:00 p.m.	Savannah State	**Troy**	Veterans Memorial Stadium • Troy, AL	ESPN3	W 66-3	20,021
September 7	6:30 p.m.	**Arkansas State**	Auburn	Jordan–Hare Stadium • Auburn, AL	FSN	L 9-38	83,246

Players of the Week

Offensive		Defensive		Special teams	
Player	Team	Player	Team	Player	Team
Ross Metheny	South Alabama	Jadarius Garner	Troy	Darryl Surgent	Louisiana-Lafayette

=== Week 3 ===
Date	Time	Visiting team	Home team	Site	TV	Result	Attendance
September 12	6:30 p.m.	**Troy**	**Arkansas State**	Liberty Bank Stadium • Jonesboro, AR	ESPNU	ASU 41-34	26,012
September 14	11:00 a.m.	**Georgia State**	West Virginia	Mountaineer Field • Morgantown, WV	Mountaineers Network	L 7-41	57,440
September 14	11:30 p.m.	**Louisiana-Monroe**	Wake Forest	BB&T Field • Winston-Salem, NC	ACC Network/ESPN3	W 21-19	26,505
September 14	6:00 p.m.	Nicholls State	**Louisiana-Lafayette**	Cajun Field • Lafayette, LA	ESPN3	W 70-7	28,871
September 14	6:30 p.m.	**Western Kentucky**	**South Alabama**	Ladd–Peebles Stadium • Mobile, AL	ESPN3	USA 31-24	17,721

- Open this week: Texas State

Players of the Week

Offensive		Defensive		Special teams	
Player	Team	Player	Team	Player	Team
Kolton Browning	Louisiana-Monroe	Tyrell Pearson	South Alabama	Aleem Sunanon	South Alabama

=== Week 4 ===
Date	Time	Visiting team	Home team	Site	TV	Result	Attendance
September 21	1:00 p.m.	Jacksonville State	**Georgia State**	Georgia Dome • Atlanta, GA	ESPN3	L 26-32	15,425
September 21	3:00 p.m.	**Louisiana-Monroe**	#20 Baylor	Floyd Casey Stadium • Waco, TX	FS1	L 7-70	42,976
September 21	3:30 p.m.	**Arkansas State**	Memphis	Liberty Bowl Memorial Stadium • Memphis, TN	ESPN3	L 7-31	36,279
September 21	5:00 p.m.	**Louisiana-Lafayette**	Akron	InfoCision Stadium-Summa Field • Akron, OH	ESPN3	W 35-30	18,809
September 21	6:00 p.m.	**Texas State**	#25 Texas Tech	Jones AT&T Stadium • Lubbock, TX	FSN	L 7-33	60,997
September 21	6:00 p.m.	Morgan State	**Western Kentucky**	Houchens Industries–L. T. Smith Stadium • Bowling Green, KY	ESPN3	W 58-17	20,973
September 21	6:30 p.m.	**Troy**	Mississippi State	Davis Wade Stadium • Starkville, MS	FSN/ESPN3	L 7-62	55,096

- Open this week: South Alabama

Players of the Week

Offensive		Defensive		Special teams	
Player	Team	Player	Team	Player	Team
Terrance Broadway	Louisiana-Lafayette	Xavius Boyd	Western Kentucky	Jonathan Dowling	Western Kentucky

=== Week 5 ===
Date	Time	Visiting team	Home team	Site	TV	Result	Attendance
September 28	11:21 a.m.	**South Alabama**	Tennessee	Neyland Stadium • Knoxville, TN	SEC Network	L 24-31	87,266
September 28	1:00 p.m.	Navy	**Western Kentucky**	Houchens Industries–L. T. Smith Stadium • Bowling Green, KY	ESPNews	W 19-7	19,813
September 28	2:00 p.m.	**Troy**	Duke	Wallace Wade Stadium • Durham, NC	ESPN3	L 31-38	30,126
September 28	6:00 p.m.	Tulane	**Louisiana-Monroe**	Malone Stadium • Monroe, LA	ESPN3	L 14-31	20,476
September 28	6:00 p.m.	Wyoming	**Texas State**	Bobcat Stadium • San Marcos, TX	Longhorn Network	W 42-21	22,150
September 28	6:30 p.m.	**Arkansas State**	Missouri	Faurot Field • Columbia, MO	CSS/ESPN3	L 19-41	62,468

- Open this week: Georgia State, Louisiana-Lafayette

Players of the Week

Offensive		Defensive		Special teams	
Player	Team	Player	Team	Player	Team
Antonio Andrews	Western Kentucky	Xavius Boyd (2)	Western Kentucky	Zach Robinson	Texas State

=== Week 6 ===
Date	Time	Visiting team	Home team	Site	TV	Result	Attendance
October 3	6:30 p.m.	**Western Kentucky**	**Louisiana-Monroe**	Malone Stadium • Monroe, LA	ESPNU	WKU 31-10	16,317
October 5	12:00 p.m.	**South Alabama**	**Troy**	Veterans Memorial Stadium • Troy, AL	Sun Belt Network	Troy 34-33	23,024
October 5	12:21 p.m.	**Georgia State**	Alabama	Bryant–Denny Stadium • Tuscaloosa, AL	SEC TV	L 3-45	101,254
October 5	6:00 p.m.	**Texas State**	**Louisiana-Lafayette**	Cajun Field • Lafayette, LA	Cox4/ESPN3	ULL 48-24	23,108

- Open this week: Arkansas State

Players of the Week

Offensive		Defensive		Special teams	
Player	Team	Player	Team	Player	Team
Eric Thomas	Troy	Xavius Boyd (3)	Western Kentucky	Brandon Smith	Texas State

=== Week 7 ===
Date	Time	Visiting team	Home team	Site	TV	Result	Attendance
October 12	2:30 p.m.	**Troy**	**Georgia State**	Georgia Dome • Atlanta, GA	Sun Belt Network	Troy 35-28	17,732
October 12	6:00 p.m.	**Louisiana-Monroe**	**Texas State**	Bobcat Stadium • San Marcos, TX	LHN	ULM 21-14	15,210
October 12	6:00 p.m.	Idaho	**Arkansas State**	Liberty Bank Stadium • Jonesboro, AR	ESPN3	W 48-24	26,781

- Open this week: South Alabama, Louisiana-Lafayette, Western Kentucky

Players of the Week

Offensive		Defensive		Special teams	
Player	Team	Player	Team	Player	Team
Adam Kennedy	Arkansas State	Isaiah Newsome	Louisiana-Monroe	J.D. McKissic	Arkansas State

=== Week 8 ===
Date	Time	Visiting team	Home team	Site	TV	Result	Attendance
October 15	7:00 p.m.	**Louisiana-Lafayette**	**Western Kentucky**	Houchens Industries–L. T. Smith Stadium • Bowling Green, KY	ESPN2	ULL 37-20	16,359
October 19	6:00 p.m.	**Georgia State**	**Texas State**	Bobcat Stadium • San Marcos, TX	Sun Belt Network	TXST 24-17	15,684
October 19	6:00 p.m.	Kent State	**South Alabama**	Ladd–Peebles Stadium • Mobile, AL	ESPN3	W 38-21	14,351

- Open this week: Arkansas State, Troy, Louisiana-Monroe

Players of the Week

Offensive		Defensive		Special teams	
Player	Team	Player	Team	Player	Team
Robert Lowe	Texas State	Justin Anderson	Louisiana-Lafayette	Will Johnson	Texas State

=== Week 9 ===
Date	Time	Visiting team	Home team	Site	TV	Result	Attendance
October 22	7:00 p.m.	**Louisiana-Lafayette**	**Arkansas State**	Liberty Bank Stadium • Jonesboro, AR	ESPN2	ULL 23-7	24,578
October 26	3:00 p.m.	**Troy**	**Western Kentucky**	Houchens Industries–L. T. Smith Stadium • Bowling Green, KY	ESPN3	Troy 32-26	20,110
October 26	6:00 p.m.	**South Alabama**	**Texas State**	Bobcat Stadium • San Marcos, TX	ESPN3	TXST 33-31	18,140
October 26	6:00 p.m.	**Georgia State**	**Louisiana-Monroe**	Malone Stadium • Monroe, LA	ESPN3	ULM 38-10	11,357

Players of the Week

Offensive		Defensive		Special teams	
Player	Team	Player	Team	Player	Team
Kolton Browning (2)	Louisiana-Monroe	Ryan Carrethers	Arkansas State	Jason Dann	Texas State

=== Week 10 ===
Date	Time	Visiting team	Home team	Site	TV	Result	Attendance
October 31	6:30 p.m.	**Louisiana-Monroe**	**Troy**	Veterans Memorial Stadium • Troy, AL	ESPNU	ULM 49-37	17,013
November 2	12:00 p.m.	**Western Kentucky**	**Georgia State**	Georgia Dome • Atlanta, GA	Sun Belt Network	WKU 44-28	15,212
November 2	4:00 p.m.	New Mexico State	**Louisiana-Lafayette**	Cajun Field • Lafayette, LA	Cox4/ESPN3	W 49-35	30,028
November 2	4:00 p.m.	**Texas State**	Idaho	Kibbie Dome • Moscow, ID	KNVA	W 37-21	15,088
November 2	6:30 p.m.	**Arkansas State**	**South Alabama**	Ladd–Peebles Stadium • Mobile, AL	ESPN3	ASU 17-16	18,228

Players of the Week

Offensive		Defensive		Special teams	
Player	Team	Player	Team	Player	Team
Alonzo Harris	Louisiana-Lafayette	Sterling Young	Arkansas State	Justin Manton	Louisiana-Monroe

=== Week 11 ===
Date	Time	Visiting team	Home team	Site	TV	Result	Attendance
November 7	6:30 p.m.	**Troy**	**Louisiana-Lafayette**	Cajun Field • Lafayette, LA	ESPNU	ULL 41-36	22,562
November 9	11:00 a.m.	**Western Kentucky**	Army	Michie Stadium • West Point, NY	CBSSN	W 21-17	36,276
November 9	6:00 p.m.	**Arkansas State**	**Louisiana-Monroe**	Malone Stadium • Monroe, LA	ESPN3	ASU 42-14	13,427

- Open this week: Georgia State, South Alabama, Texas State

Players of the Week

Offensive		Defensive		Special teams	
Player	Team	Player	Team	Player	Team
Adam Kennedy (2)	Arkansas State	Tyler Roberts	Troy	Darryl Surgent	Louisiana-Lafayette (2)

=== Week 12 ===
Date	Time	Visiting team	Home team	Site	TV	Result	Attendance
November 16	11:00 a.m.	**Troy**	Ole Miss	Vaught–Hemingway Stadium • Oxford, MS	ESPNU	L 51-21	52,931
November 16	2:00 p.m.	**Louisiana-Lafayette**	**Georgia State**	Georgia Dome • Atlanta, GA	ESPN3	ULL 35-21	14,415
November 16	2:30 p.m.	**South Alabama**	Navy	Navy–Marine Corps Memorial Stadium • Annapolis, MD	CBSSN	L 42-14	33,086
November 16	6:30 p.m.	**Texas State**	**Arkansas State**	Liberty Bank Stadium • Jonesboro, AR	Sun Belt Network	ASU 38-21	23,143

- Open this week: Louisiana-Monroe, Western Kentucky

Players of the Week

Offensive		Defensive		Special teams	
Player	Team	Player	Team	Player	Team
Elijah McGuire	Louisiana-Lafayette	Trae Johnson	Louisiana-Lafayette	Brian Davis	Arkansas State

=== Week 13 ===
Date	Time	Visiting team	Home team	Site	TV	Result	Attendance
November 23	6:00 p.m.	**Western Kentucky**	**Texas State**	Bobcat Stadium • San Marcos, TX	LHN	WKU 38-7	17,051
November 23	6:00 p.m.	**Louisiana-Monroe**	**South Alabama**	Ladd–Peebles Stadium • Mobile, AL	Sun Belt Network	USA 36-14	13,891
November 23	2:00 p.m.	**Georgia State**	**Arkansas State**	Liberty Bank Stadium • Jonesboro, AR	ESPN3	ASU 35-33	18,512

- Open this week : Troy, Louisiana-Lafayette

Players of the Week

Offensive		Defensive		Special teams	
Player	Team	Player	Team	Player	Team
Antonio Andrews (2)	Western Kentucky	Cam Thomas	Western Kentucky	Brock Barnhill	Arkansas State

=== Week 14 ===
Date	Time	Visiting team	Home team	Site	TV	Result	Attendance
November 29	1:00 p.m.	**Texas State**	**Troy**	Veterans Memorial Stadium • Troy, AL	ESPN3	Troy 28-42	13,073
November 30	1:00 p.m.	**South Alabama**	**Georgia State**	Georgia Dome • Atlanta, GA	ESPN3	USA 38-17	13,697
November 30	3:00 p.m.	**Arkansas State**	**Western Kentucky**	Houchens Industries–L. T. Smith Stadium • Bowling Green, KY	ESPN3	WKU 31-34	14,417
November 30	6:00 p.m.	**Louisiana-Monroe**	**Louisiana-Lafayette**	Cajun Field • Lafayette, LA	Sun Belt Network/ESPN3	ULM 31-28	25,309

Players of the Week

Offensive		Defensive		Special teams	
Player	Team	Player	Team	Player	Team

=== Week 15 ===
Date	Time	Visiting team	Home team	Site	TV	Result	Attendance
December 7	7:00 p.m.	**Louisiana-Lafayette**	**South Alabama**	Ladd–Peebles Stadium • Mobile, AL	Cox4/ESPN3	USA, 30-8	16,124

Players of the Week

Offensive		Defensive		Special teams	
Player	Team	Player	Team	Player	Team

== Bowl games ==
In 2013, the SBC placed 2 teams in bowl games, while 5 other teams were bowl-eligible but not selected for bowl games. The conference went 2-0 with Arkansas State and Louisiana-Lafayette both winning.

NOTE: All times are local

Bowl	Date	Time	SBC team (Record)	Opponent (Record)	Site	TV	Result	Attendance
2013 R+L Carriers New Orleans Bowl	December 21	8:00 p.m.	Louisiana–Lafayette (8-3)	Tulane (7-5)	Mercedes-Benz Superdome • New Orleans, LA	ESPN	ULL 24-21	54,728
2014 GoDaddy Bowl	January 5	8:00 p.m.	Arkansas State (7-5)	Ball State (10-2)	Ladd–Peebles Stadium • Mobile, AL	ESPN	ASU 23-20	36,119

== Players of the Year ==
2013 Sun Belt Player of the Year awards

Award	Player	School
Player of the Year	Antonio Andrews	Western Kentucky
Offensive Player of the Year	Antonio Andrews	Western Kentucky
Defensive Player of the Year	Xavius Boyd	Western Kentucky
Freshman of the Year	Elijah McGuire	Louisiana-Lafayette
Coach of the Year	Joey Jones	South Alabama

== All-Sun Belt/American Team ==
Coaches All-Conference Selections

Position	Player	Class	Team
First Team Offense
QB	Corey Robinson	SR	Troy
RB	Alonzo Harris	JR	Louisiana-Lafayette
RB	Elijah McGuire	FR	Louisiana-Lafayette
RB	Antonio Andrews	SR	Western Kentucky
WR	J. D. McKissic	SO	Arkansas State
WR	Albert Wilson	SR	Georgia State
WR	Eric Thomas	SR	Troy
TE	Wes Saxton	JR	South Alabama
OL	Andre Huval	SR	Louisiana-Lafayette
OL	Josh Allen	SR	Louisiana-Monroe
OL	Chris May	SO	South Alabama
OL	Terrence Jones	JR	Troy
OL	Luis Polanco	SR	Western Kentucky
First Team Defense
DL	Ryan Carrethers	SR	Arkansas State
DL	Romelle Jones	SR	South Alabama
DL	Alex Page	SR	South Alabama
DL	Bar’ee Boyd	SR	Western Kentucky
LB	Qushaun Lee	JR	Arkansas State
LB	Justin Alexander	SR	Louisiana-Lafayette
LB	Xavius Boyd	SR	Western Kentucky
DB	Isaiah Newsome	SR	Louisiana-Monroe
DB	Camren Hudson	SR	Troy
DB	Jonathan Dowling	JR	Western Kentucky
DB	Cam Thomas	JR	Western Kentucky
First Team Special Teams
PK	Brian Davis	SR	Arkansas State
P	Justin Manton	JR	Louisiana-Monroe
RS	Darryl Surgent	SR	Louisiana-Lafayette
AP	J. D. McKissic	SO	Arkansas State

Position	Player	Class	Team
Second Team Offense
QB	Ross Metheny	SR	South Alabama
RB	Michael Gordon	SO	Arkansas State
RB	Robert Lowe	SO	Texas State
WR	Jamal Robinson	JR	Louisiana-Lafayette
WR	Rashon Ceaser	SO	Louisiana-Monroe
WR	Shavarez Smith	JR	South Alabama
TE	Darion Griswold	SO	Arkansas State
OL	Bryce Giddens	SO	Arkansas State
OL	Steven Haunga	SR	Arkansas State
OL	Daniel Quave	JR	Louisiana-Lafayette
OL	Ucambre Williams	SR	South Alabama
OL	Evan McKissack	SR	Troy
Second Team Defense
DL	Justin Hamilton	JR	Louisiana-Lafayette
DL	Gerrand Johnson	SO	Louisiana-Monroe
DL	Antonio Gillespie	SR	Troy
DL	Tyler Roberts	SO	Troy
LB	Cameron Blakes	SR	Louisiana-Monroe
LB	Enrique Williams	SR	South Alabama
LB	Andrew Jackson	SR	Western Kentucky
DB	Rocky Hayes	SO	Arkansas State
DB	Sterling Young	JR	Arkansas State
DB	Trevence Patt	JR	Louisiana-Lafayette
DB	Justin Iwuji	SR	Texas State
Second Team Special Teams
PK	Will Scott	SR	Troy
P	Will Scott	SR	Troy
RS	J. D. McKissic	SO	Arkansas State
AP	Albert Wilson	SR	Georgia State

Honorable Mention: Arkansas State: Adam Kennedy, Chris Stone; Georgia State: Ulrick John, Joseph Peterson; Louisiana-Lafayette: Jacob Maxwell, Dominique Tovell; Louisiana-Monroe: Kolton Browning, Centarius Donald; South Alabama Jay Jones, Aleem Sunanon; Texas State: David Mayo, Mike Orakpo; Troy: Jordan Chunn, Bryan Holmes; Western Kentucky: Willie McNeal, Forrest Lamp.

=== All-Americans ===
Western Kentucky's Antonio Andrews was named 1st team All-American by SI for All-Purpose team.

== Home attendance ==
Team	Stadium (Capacity)	Game 1	Game 2	Game 3	Game 4	Game 5	Game 6	Game 7	Total	Average	% of Capacity
Arkansas State	Liberty Bank Stadium (30,406)	30,351	26,012	26,781	24,578	23,143	18,512		149,377	24,896	81.9%
Georgia State	Georgia Dome (28,155)	17,606	14,952	15,425	17,732	15,212	14,415	13,697	109,039	15,577	55.3%
Louisiana–Lafayette	Cajun Field (31,000)	28,871	23,108	30,028	22,562	25,309			129,878	25,976	83.8%
Louisiana–Monroe	Malone Stadium (30,427)	23,600	20,476	16,317	11,357	13,427			85,177	17,035	56.0%
South Alabama	Ladd–Peebles Stadium (33,471)	15,204	17,721	14,351	18,228	13,891			79,395	15,879	47.4%
Texas State	Bobcat Stadium (30,000)	20,136	22,150	15,210	15,684	18,140	17,051		108,371	18,062	60.2%
Troy	Veterans Memorial Stadium (30,000)	21,398	20,021	23,024	17,013	13,073			94,529	18,906	63.0%
Western Kentucky	Houchens Industries–L. T. Smith Stadium (22,113)	46,723†	20,973	19,813	16,359	20,110	14,417		91,672	18,334	82.9%

†Western Kentucky played first game at LP Field in Nashville, Tennessee vs. Kentucky (Counted as home game). Total attendance, average attendance and percent of capacity figure calculated based only on games in L.T. Smith Stadium
