= 2013 Western Kentucky Hilltoppers football team =

American college football season

2013 Western Kentucky Hilltoppers football
- Conference: Sun Belt Conference
- Record: 8–4 (4–3 Sun Belt)
- Head coach: Bobby Petrino (1st season)
- Offensive coordinator: Jeff Brohm (1st season)
- Offensive scheme: Multiple
- Defensive coordinator: Nick Holt (1st season)
- Base defense: 4–3
- Home stadium: Houchens Industries–L. T. Smith Stadium

2013 Sun Belt Conference football standings
	Conf.			Overall
Team	W		L	W		L
Arkansas State $	5	–	2	8	–	5
Western Kentucky	4	–	3	8	–	4
South Alabama	4	–	3	6	–	6
Troy	4	–	3	6	–	6
Louisiana–Monroe	4	–	3	6	–	6
Texas State	2	–	5	6	–	6
Louisiana–Lafayette *	0	–	2	1	–	4
Georgia State **	0	–	7	0	–	12
$ – Conference champion; * – Louisiana–Lafayette vacated eight wins due to NCAA violations ** – Georgia State ineligible for postseason play due to FCS-to-FBS transition rules

The 2013 Western Kentucky Hilltoppers football team represented Western Kentucky University (WKU) in the 2013 NCAA Division I FBS football season. They were led by first year head coach Bobby Petrino and played their home games at Houchens Industries–L. T. Smith Stadium. They were a member of the Sun Belt Conference. They finished the season 8–4, 4–3 in Sun Belt play to finish in a four-way tie for second place. Despite being bowl eligible, they were not selected to play in a bowl game. This was their last season as a member of the Sun Belt as they moved to Conference USA in the 2014 season.

== Schedule ==
Date	Time	Opponent	Site	TV	Result	Attendance
August 31	6:00 p.m.	vs. Kentucky*	LP Field; Nashville, TN	ESPNews	W 35–26	47,623
September 7	11:21 a.m.	at Tennessee*	Neyland Stadium; Knoxville, TN	SECTV	L 20–52	86,783
September 14	6:30 p.m.	at South Alabama	Ladd–Peebles Stadium; Mobile, AL	ESPN3	L 24–31	17,721
September 21	6:00 p.m.	Morgan State*	Houchens Industries–L. T. Smith Stadium; Bowling Green, KY	ESPN3	W 58–17	20,973
September 28	1:00 p.m.	Navy*	Houchens Industries–L. T. Smith Stadium; Bowling Green, KY	ESPNews	W 19–7	19,813
October 3	6:30 p.m.	at Louisiana–Monroe	Malone Stadium; Monroe, LA	ESPNU	W 31–10	16,317
October 15	7:00 p.m.	Louisiana–Lafayette	Houchens Industries–L. T. Smith Stadium; Bowling Green, KY	ESPN2	L 20–37	16,359
October 26	3:00 p.m.	Troy^{†}	Houchens Industries–L. T. Smith Stadium; Bowling Green, KY	ESPN3	L 26–32	20,110
November 2	12:00 p.m.	at Georgia State	Georgia Dome; Atlanta, GA	Sun Belt Network	W 44–28	15,212
November 9	11:00 a.m.	at Army*	Michie Stadium; West Point, NY	CBSSN	W 21–17	36,276
November 23	6:00 p.m.	at Texas State	Bobcat Stadium; San Marcos, TX	LHN	W 38–7	17,051
November 30	3:00 p.m.	Arkansas State	Houchens Industries–L. T. Smith Stadium; Bowling Green, KY	ESPN3	W 34–31	14,417
*Non-conference game; ^{†}Homecoming; All times are in Central time

Schedule source:
