= Jamal Robinson (American football) =

American gridiron football player (born 1993)

No. 19
- Position: Wide receiver

Personal information
- Born: January 13, 1993 (age 33); New Orleans, Louisiana, U.S.
- Listed height: 6 ft 4 in (1.93 m)
- Listed weight: 205 lb (93 kg)

Career information
- High school: Slidell (LA) Salmen
- College: Louisiana–Lafayette
- NFL draft: 2016: undrafted

Career history
- Jacksonville Jaguars (2016–2017)*; Hamilton Tiger-Cats (2017–2018)*; Birmingham Iron (2019)
- * Offseason or practice squad member only

Awards and highlights
- Second-team All-Sun Belt (2013)
- Stats at Pro Football Reference

Jamal Robinson (born January 13, 1993) is an American former football wide receiver. He previously played for the Hamilton Tiger-Cats of the Canadian Football League (CFL) and played college football at Louisiana-Lafayette.

== Early life ==
Robinson attended Salmen High School in Slidell, Louisiana, where he earned all-state honors as a senior. That year, he caught 84 passes for 1,021 yards and 19 touchdowns. He was rated three-star prospect by Rivals.com. In his junior year, he made 48 catches for 623 yards and eight touchdowns.

He was a two-sport athlete, playing basketball, as well. His junior season, the basketball team won the state title. His senior year, they went 26 and 7, and advanced to the state quarterfinals.

== Professional career ==
Robinson was signed by the Jacksonville Jaguars as an undrafted free agent on May 1, 2016. He was waived by the Jaguars on August 29 and was later added to the practice squad on September 7. He signed a reserve/future contract with the Jaguars on January 9, 2017.

On September 1, 2017, Robinson was waived by the Jaguars.

On October 3, 2017, Robinson was signed to the Hamilton Tiger-Cats' practice roster. He was traded from the Tiger-Cats to the Alouettes on June 10, 2018.

In 2018, Robinson signed with the Birmingham Iron of the Alliance of American Football. He was waived before the start of the 2019 regular season, but was re-signed on February 22, 2019. The league ceased operations in April 2019.

== Personal life ==
He was born on January 13, 1993, in New Orleans, Louisiana to Tashawn Mitchell and Joy Robinson. He has one brother, Jalil, and three sisters Jazmon, Jeuel and Jaliyah. He majored in criminal justice. He's married to Derione Green Robinson and has two kids together as well, Autymn and Jamal Jr Robinson.
