= List of Southern Miss Golden Eagles football seasons =

This is a list of seasons completed by the Southern Miss Golden Eagles college football team.

National champions	Bowl Win	Conference champions	Winning Season

Season	Conference	Coach (#)	Final record	Bowl game	Season results/notables
1912	Independent	Ronald J. Slay (1)	2–1		
1913	Independent	M. J. "Blondie" Williams (2)	1–5–1		
1914	Independent	A. B. Dillie (3)	2–3–1		
1915	Independent	A. B. Dillie	4–4		
1916	Independent	A. B. Dillie	0–3		
1917	Independent	No team fielded due to World War I			
1918	Independent	No team fielded due to World War I			
1919	Independent	Cephus Allen Anderson (4)	4–1–2		
1920	Independent	B. B. O'Mara (5)	5–2–1		
1921	Independent	O. V. "Spout" Austin (6)	3–4		
1922	Independent	O. V. "Spout" Austin	2–6		
1923	Independent	O. V. "Spout" Austin	3–3		
1924	Independent	William Herschel Bobo (7)	3–3–2		
1925	Independent	William Herschel Bobo	0–6		
1926	Independent	William Herschel Bobo	3–4–1		
1927	Independent	William Herschel Bobo	3–4–1		
1928	Independent	William H. Saunders (8)	4–5		
1929	Independent	William H. Saunders	2–6–1		
1930	Independent	John Lumpkin (9)	3–5–1		
1931	SIAA	Allison "Pooley" Hubert (10)	2–5		
1932	SIAA	Allison "Pooley" Hubert	5–4		
1933	SIAA	Allison "Pooley" Hubert	3–5–2		
1934	SIAA	Allison "Pooley" Hubert	3–4–2		
1935	SIAA	Allison "Pooley" Hubert	6–4		Would be the beginning of a long winning period where program would only suffer eight losing seasons overall and never have back-to-back losing seasons until 2012-2013
1936	SIAA	Allison "Pooley" Hubert	7–2–1		
1937	SIAA	Reed Green (11)	7–3	Won Postseason game vs. Appalachian State 7–0	Appalachian State was previously undefeated and unscored upon
1938	SIAA	Reed Green	7–2		
1939	SIAA	Reed Green	4–2–3		
1940	SIAA	Reed Green	7–4		
1941	SIAA	Reed Green	9–0–1		
1942	Independent	Reed Green	4–0		
1943	Independent	No team fielded due to World War II			
1944	Independent	No team fielded due to World War II			
1945	Independent	No team fielded due to World War II			
1946	Independent	Reed Green	7–3	Won Bacardi Bowl vs. Havana University 55–0	First bowl win in School History
1947	Independent	Reed Green	7–3		
1948	Gulf States	Reed Green	7–3		Gulf States Conference Champions
1949	Gulf States	Thad "Pie" Vann (12)	7–3		
1950	Gulf States	Thad "Pie" Vann	5–5		Gulf States Conference Champions
1951	Gulf States	Thad "Pie" Vann	6–5		Gulf States Conference Champions
1952	Independent	Thad "Pie" Vann	10–2	Lost Sun Bowl vs. Pacific 26–7	First year of NCAA College Division independent
1953	Independent	Thad "Pie" Vann	9–2	Lost Sun Bowl vs. Texas Western (UTEP) 37–14	
1954	Independent	Thad "Pie" Vann	6–4		
1955	Independent	Thad "Pie" Vann	9–1		
1956	Independent	Thad "Pie" Vann	7–2–1	Lost Tangerine Bowl vs. West Texas State 20–13	
1957	Independent	Thad "Pie" Vann	8–3	Lost Tangerine Bowl vs. East Texas State 10–9	
1958	Independent	Thad "Pie" Vann	9–0		8th consecutive winning season Voted College Division National Champion
1959	Independent	Thad "Pie" Vann	6–4		
1960	Independent	Thad "Pie" Vann	6–4		
1961	Independent	Thad "Pie" Vann	8–2		
1962	Independent	Thad "Pie" Vann	9–1		12th Consecutive Winning Season; Voted College Division National Champion
1963	Independent	Thad "Pie" Vann	5–3–1		First year of NCAA University Division independent
1964	Independent	Thad "Pie" Vann	6–3		
1965	Independent	Thad "Pie" Vann	7–2		
1966	Independent	Thad "Pie" Vann	6–4		
1967	Independent	Thad "Pie" Vann	6–3		17th Consecutive Winning Season
1968	Independent	Thad "Pie" Vann	4–6		
1969	Independent	P.W. "Bear" Underwood (13)	5–5		
1970	Independent	P.W. "Bear" Underwood	5–6		
1971	Independent	P.W. "Bear" Underwood	6–5		
1972	Independent	P.W. "Bear" Underwood	3–7–1		
1973	Independent	P.W. "Bear" Underwood	6–4–1		
1974	Independent	P.W. "Bear" Underwood	6–5		
1975	Independent	Bobby Collins (14)	8–3		
1976	Independent	Bobby Collins	3–8		
1977	Independent	Bobby Collins	6–6		
1978	Independent	Bobby Collins	7–4		First year as NCAA Division I / I-A independent
1979	Independent	Bobby Collins	6–4–1		
1980	Independent	Bobby Collins	9–3	Won Independence Bowl vs. McNeese State 16–14	Second bowl win in school history
1981	Independent	Bobby Collins	9–2–1	Lost Florida Citrus Bowl vs. Missouri 19–17	Final ranking UPI #19
1982	Independent	Jim Carmody (15)	7–4		
1983	Independent	Jim Carmody	7–4		
1984	Independent	Jim Carmody	4–7		
1985	Independent	Jim Carmody	7–4		
1986	Independent	Jim Carmody	6–5		
1987	Independent	Jim Carmody	6–5		
1988	Independent	Curley Hallman (16)	10–2	Won Independence Bowl vs. UTEP 38–18	
1989	Independent	Curley Hallman	5–6		
1990	Independent	Curley Hallman; Jeff Bower (17)	8–4	Lost All-American Bowl vs. North Carolina State 31–27	Brett Favre's last game Jeff Bower's first game as head coach (bowl game)
1991	Independent	Jeff Bower	4–7		
1992	Independent	Jeff Bower	7–4		
1993	Independent	Jeff Bower	3–7–1		
1994	Independent	Jeff Bower	6–5		
1995	Independent	Jeff Bower	6–5		
1996	C-USA	Jeff Bower	8–3		C-USA Co-Champions
1997	C-USA	Jeff Bower	9–3	Won Liberty Bowl vs. Pittsburgh 41–7	C-USA Champions; Final Ranking AP #19, USA Today #19
1998	C-USA	Jeff Bower	7–5	Lost Humanitarian Bowl vs. Idaho 42–35	
1999	C-USA	Jeff Bower	9–3	Won Liberty Bowl vs. Colorado State 23–17	C-USA Champions; Final Ranking AP #14, USA Today #13
2000	C-USA	Jeff Bower	8–4	Won Mobile Alabama Bowl vs. #13 TCU 28–21	
2001	C-USA	Jeff Bower	6–5		
2002	C-USA	Jeff Bower	7–6	Lost Houston Bowl vs. Oklahoma State 33–23	Rod Davis, Conerly Trophy Award Winner
2003	C-USA	Jeff Bower	9–4	Lost Liberty Bowl vs. #25 Utah 17–0	C-USA Champions
2004	C-USA	Jeff Bower	7–5	Won New Orleans Bowl vs. North Texas 31–10	Michael Boley, Conerly Trophy Award Winner
2005	C-USA	Jeff Bower	7–5	Won New Orleans Bowl vs. Arkansas State 31–19	12th Consecutive Winning Season
2006	C-USA	Jeff Bower	9–5	Won GMAC Bowl vs. Ohio 28–7	C-USA East Division Champions
2007	C-USA	Jeff Bower	7–6	Lost PapaJohns.com Bowl vs. Cincinnati 31–21	Damion Fletcher, Conerly Trophy Award Winner
2008	C-USA	Larry Fedora (18)	7–6	Won New Orleans Bowl vs. Troy 30–27 OT	
2009	C-USA	Larry Fedora	7–6	Lost New Orleans Bowl vs. Middle Tennessee State 42–32	
2010	C-USA	Larry Fedora	8–5	Lost Beef 'O' Brady's Bowl vs. Louisville 28–31	
2011	C-USA	Larry Fedora	12–2	Won Sheraton Hawai'i Bowl vs. Nevada 24–17	18th Consecutive Winning Season; C-USA Champions; Final Ranking #20 AP, #19 Coaches
2012	C-USA	Ellis Johnson (19)	0–12		Johnson fired after one season
2013	C-USA	Todd Monken (20)	1–11		First time since 1934 that program suffered back-to-back losing seasons
2014	C-USA	Todd Monken	3–9		
2015	C-USA	Todd Monken	9–5	Lost Heart of Dallas Bowl vs. Washington 44–31	Monken resigned after season
2016	C-USA	Jay Hopson (21)	7–6	Won New Orleans Bowl vs. Louisiana-Lafayette 28–21	
2017	C-USA	Jay Hopson	8–5	Lost Independence Bowl vs. Florida State 13–42	
2018	C-USA	Jay Hopson	6–5		
2019	C-USA	Jay Hopson	7–6	Lost Armed Forces Bowl vs. Tulane 13–30	
2020	C-USA	Jay Hopson / Scotty Walden (interim) / Tim Billings (interim)	3–7		Hopson resigned after first game, Walden named interim coach. Walden left mid-season to coach Austin Peay, Tim Billings named interim coach.
2021	C-USA	Will Hall (22)	3–9		
2022	Sun Belt	Will Hall	7–6	Won LendingTree Bowl vs. Rice 38–24	
2023	Sun Belt	Will Hall	3–9		
2024	Sun Belt	Reed Stringer (interim)	1–11		Will Hall fired beginning of season. Reed takes over for remainder of season.
2025	Sun Belt	Charles Huff	7–6	Lost New Orleans Bowl vs. Western Kentucky 27-16	
Totals		23 Coaches	604–440–27	13–16 Bowl Record	71 Winning Seasons; 8 Conference Championships; 13 Bowl Wins; 2 Division II National Championships
