= List of Southern Miss Golden Eagles head football coaches =

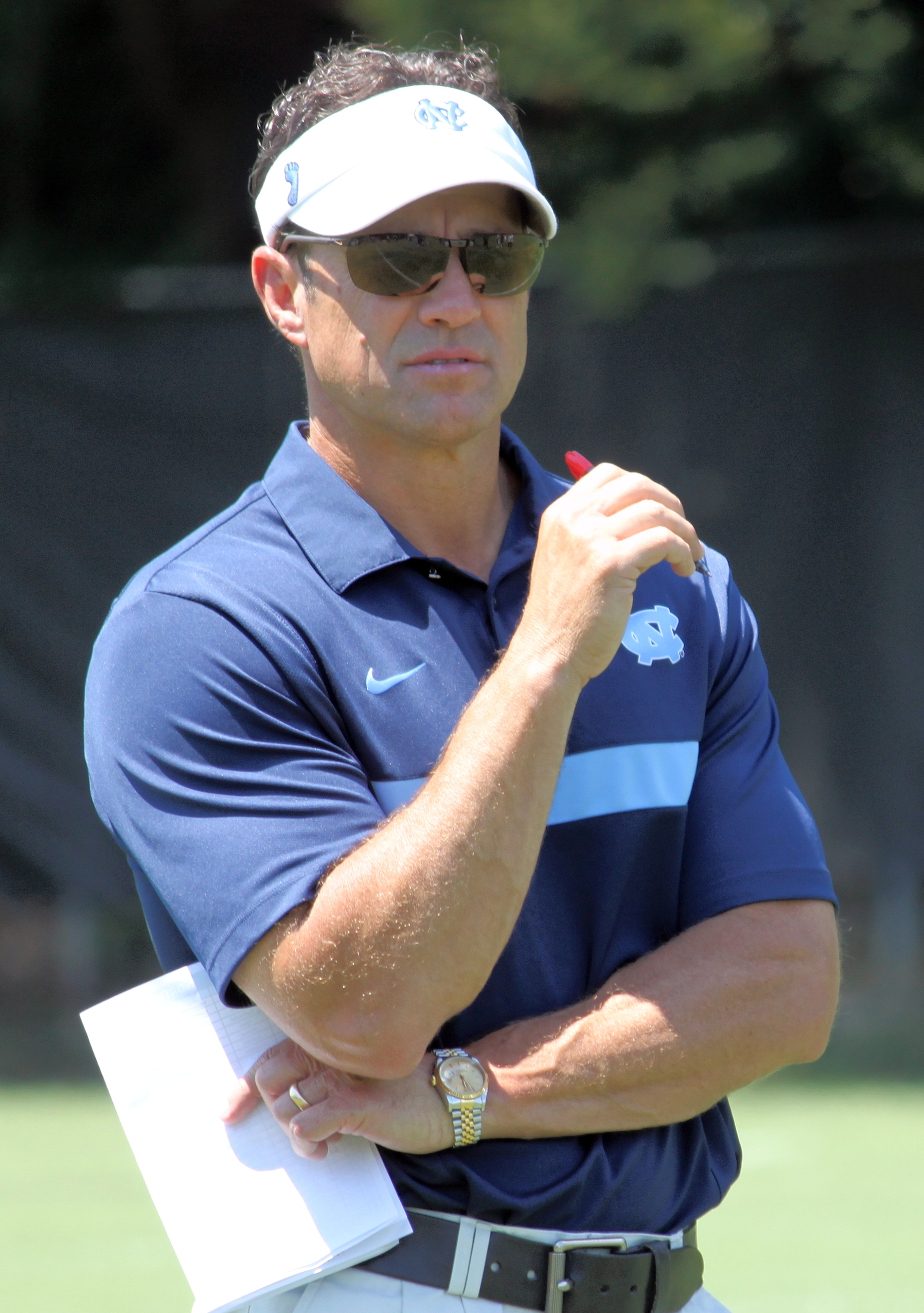
Larry Fedora served as the 18th head coach of the Southern Miss Golden Eagles from 2008 to 2011.

The Southern Miss Golden Eagles college football team represents the University of Southern Mississippi in the West Division of the Sun Belt Conference (SBC). The Golden Eagles competes as part of the NCAA Division I Football Bowl Subdivision. The program has had 24 head coaches, and 3 interim head coaches, since it began play during the 1912 season. Since December 2025, Blake Anderson has served as head coach at Southern Miss.

The Golden Eagles have played more than 1,100 games over 113 seasons. In that time, ten coaches have led Southern Miss in postseason bowl games: Reed Green, Thad Vann, Bobby Collins, Curley Hallman, Jeff Bower, Larry Fedora, Todd Monken, Jay Hopson, Will Hall, and Anderson. Four of those coaches also won conference championships: Green captured one and Vann two as a member of the Gulf States Conference; and Bower captured four and Fedora one as a member of Conference USA.

Vann is the leader in seasons coached and games won, with 139 victories during his 20 years with the program. Green has the highest winning percentage of those who have coached more than one game, with .735. Ellis Johnson and Reed Stringer have the lowest winning percentage of those who have coached more than one game, with .000. Of the 23 different head coaches who have led the Golden Eagles, Vann has been inducted into the College Football Hall of Fame.

== Key ==
Key to symbols in coaches list
General		Overall		Conference		Postseason (Note: Although the first Rose Bowl Game was played in 1902, it has been continuously played since the 1916 game, and is recognized as the oldest bowl game by the NCAA. "—" indicates any season prior to 1916 when postseason games were not played.)	
No.	Order of coaches (Note: A running total of the number of head coaches, with coaches who served separate tenures being counted only once. Interim head coaches are represented with "Int" and are not counted in the running total. "—" indicates the team played but either without a coach or no coach is on record. "X" indicates an interim year without play.)	GC	Games coached	CW	Conference wins	PW	Postseason wins
DC	Division championships	OW	Overall wins	CL	Conference losses	PL	Postseason losses
CC	Conference championships	OL	Overall losses	CT	Conference ties	PT	Postseason ties
NC	National championships	OT	Overall ties (Note: Overtime rules in college football were introduced in 1996, making ties impossible in the period since.)	C%	Conference winning percentage		
†	Elected to the College Football Hall of Fame	O%	Overall winning percentage (Note: When computing the win–loss percentage, a tie counts as half a win and half a loss.)				

== Coaches ==
List of head football coaches showing season(s) coached, overall records, conference records, postseason records, championships and selected awards (Note: Statistics correct as of the end of the 2024 NCAA Division I FBS football season.)
No.	Name	Season(s) (Note: Southern Miss did not field teams in 1917 and 1918 due to World War I and in 1943, 1944, and 1945 due to World War II.)	GC	OW	OL	OT	O%	CW	CL	CT	C%	PW	PL	PT	DC (Note: Divisional champions have advanced to the Conference USA Football Championship Game since the institution of divisional play beginning in the 2005 season.)	CC	NC	Awards
1	Ronald J. Slay	1912	3	2	1	0	0.667	—	—	—	—	—	—	—	—	—	0	—
2	Blondie Williams	1913	7	1	5	1	0.214	—	—	—	—	—	—	—	—	—	0	—
3	A. B. Dille	1914–1916	17	6	10	1	0.382	—	—	—	—	—	—	—	—	—	0	—
4	Cephus Anderson	1919	7	4	1	2	0.714	—	—	—	—	—	—	—	—	—	0	—
5	B. B. O'Mara	1920	7	4	2	1	0.643	—	—	—	—	—	—	—	—	—	0	—
6	O. V. Austin	1921–1923	21	8	13	0	0.381	—	—	—	—	—	—	—	—	—	0	—
7	William Herschel Bobo	1924–1927	30	9	17	4	0.367	—	—	—	—	—	—	—	—	—	0	—
8	William B. Saunders	1928–1929	18	6	11	1	0.361	—	—	—	—	—	—	—	—	—	0	—
9	John Lumpkin	1930	9	3	5	1	0.389	—	—	—	—	—	—	—	—	—	0	—
10	Pooley Hubert	1931–1936	55	26	24	5	0.509	18	16	3	0.527	—	—	—	—	0	0	—
11	Reed Green	1937–1942; 1946–1948	73	59	20	4	0.735	25	4	1	0.850	1	0	0	—	1	0	—
12	Thad Vann^{†}	1949–1968	200	139	59	2	0.700	9	2	0	0.818	0	4	0	—	2	2 – 1958, 1962	—
13	P. W. Underwood	1969–1974	65	31	32	2	0.492	—	—	—	—	0	0	0	—	—	0	—
14	Bobby Collins	1975–1981	80	48	30	2	0.613	—	—	—	—	1	1	0	—	—	0	—
15	Jim Carmody	1982–1987	66	37	29	0	0.561	—	—	—	—	0	0	0	—	—	0	—
16	Curley Hallman	1988–1990	36	23	13	0	0.639	—	—	—	—	1	0	0	—	—	0	—
17	Jeff Bower	1990–2007	203	119	83	1	0.589	63	24	—	0.724	6	5	0	1	4	0	—
18	Larry Fedora	2008–2011	53	34	19	—	0.642	20	12	—	0.625	2	2	—	1	1	0	—
19	Ellis Johnson	2012	12	0	12	—	.000	0	8	—	.000	0	0	—	0	0	0	—
20	Todd Monken	2013–2015	38	13	25	—	0.342	9	15	—	0.375	0	1	—	1	0	0	—
21	Jay Hopson	2016–2020	51	28	23	—	0.549	20	12	—	0.625	1	2	—	0	0	0	—
Int	Scotty Walden (Note: Scotty Walden was named interim after Jay Hopson resigned after the first game of the 2020 season. Walden resigned as interim head coach after four games to become head coach at Austin Peay.)	2020	4	1	3	—	0.250	1	1	—	0.500	0	0	—	0	0	0	—
Int	Tim Billings (Note: Tim Billings was named interim, and completed the 2020 season after Scotty Walden resigned amid-season to become head coach at Austin Peay.)	2020	5	2	3	—	0.400	1	3	—	0.250	0	0	—	0	0	0	—
22	Will Hall	2021–2024	44	14	30	—	0.318	8	19	—	0.296	1	0	—	0	0	0	—
Int.	Reed Stringer (Note: Reed Stringer was named interim head coach for the final five games of the 2024 season, following the termination of Will Hall as head coach.)	2024	5	0	5	—	.000	0	5	—	.000	0	0	—	0	0	0	—
23	Charles Huff	2025	12	7	5	—	0.583	5	3	—	0.625	0	0	—	0	0	0	—
24	Blake Anderson	2026–present	1	0	1	—	.000	0	0	—	–	0	1	—	0	0	0	—
