= List of Southern Miss Golden Eagles bowl games =

The Southern Miss Golden Eagles football team competes as part of the NCAA Division I Football Bowl Subdivision (FBS), representing the University of Southern Mississippi as a member of Conference USA (C-USA). Since the establishment of the team in 1912, Southern Miss has appeared in 27 bowl games. In their latest bowl appearance, Southern Miss defeated Rice in the 2022 LendingTree Bowl. The win brings the Golden Eagles' overall bowl record to 12 wins and 15 losses.

== Bowl games ==
List of bowl games showing bowl played in, score, date, season, opponent, stadium, location, attendance and head coach (Note: Statistics correct as of 2021–22 NCAA football bowl games.)
#	Bowl	Score (Note: Results are sortable first by whether the result was a Southern Miss win, loss or tie and then second by the margin of victory.)	Date	Season (Note: Links to the season article for the Southern Miss team that competed in the bowl for that year.)	Opponent (Note: Links to the season article for the opponent that Southern Miss competed against in the bowl for that year when available or to their general page when unavailable.)	Stadium	Location	Attendance	Head coach	References
1	Sun Bowl	L 7–26	January 1, 1953	1952	Pacific Tigers	Kidd Field	El Paso, TX	10,000	Thad Vann	
2	Sun Bowl	L 14–37	January 1, 1954	1953	Texas Western Miners	Kidd Field	El Paso, TX		Thad Vann	
3	Tangerine Bowl	L 13–20	January 1, 1957	1956	West Texas State Buffaloes	Tangerine Bowl	Orlando, FL	11,000	Thad Vann	
4	Tangerine Bowl	L 9–10	January 1, 1958	1957	East Texas State Lions	Tangerine Bowl	Orlando, FL	12,000	Thad Vann	
5	Independence Bowl	W 16–14	December 13, 1980	1980	McNeese State Cowboys	Independence Stadium	Shreveport, LA	42,600	Bobby Collins	
6	Tangerine Bowl	L 17–19	December 19, 1981	1981	Missouri Tigers	Orlando Stadium	Orlando, FL	50,045	Bobby Collins	
7	Independence Bowl	W 38–18	December 23, 1988	1988	UTEP Miners	Independence Stadium	Shreveport, LA	20,242	Curley Hallman	
8	All-American Bowl	L 27–31	December 28, 1990	1990	NC State Wolfpack	Legion Field	Birmingham, AL	44,000	Jeff Bower	
9	Liberty Bowl	W 41–7	December 31, 1997	1997	Pittsburgh Panthers	Liberty Bowl Memorial Stadium	Memphis, TN	50,209	Jeff Bower	
10	Humanitarian Bowl	L 35–42	December 30, 1998	1998	Idaho Vandals	Bronco Stadium	Boise, ID	19,667	Jeff Bower	
11	Liberty Bowl	W 23–17	December 31, 1999	1999	Colorado State Rams	Liberty Bowl Memorial Stadium	Memphis, TN	56,570	Jeff Bower	
12	Mobile Alabama Bowl	W 28–21	December 20, 2000	2000	TCU Horned Frogs	Ladd–Peebles Stadium	Mobile, AL	40,300	Jeff Bower	
13	Houston Bowl	L 23–33	December 27, 2002	2002	Oklahoma State Cowboys	Reliant Stadium	Houston, TX	40,300	Jeff Bower	
14	Liberty Bowl	L 0–17	December 31, 2003	2003	Utah Utes	Liberty Bowl Memorial Stadium	Memphis, TN	55,989	Jeff Bower	
15	New Orleans Bowl	W 31–10	December 14, 2004	2004	North Texas Mean Green	Louisiana Superdome	New Orleans, LA	27,253	Jeff Bower	
16	New Orleans Bowl	W 31–19	December 20, 2005	2005	Arkansas State Indians	Cajun Field	Lafayette, LA	18,338	Jeff Bower	
17	GMAC Bowl	W 28–7	January 7, 2007	2006	Ohio Bobcats	Ladd–Peebles Stadium	Mobile, AL	28,706	Jeff Bower	
18	PapaJohns.com Bowl	L 21–31	December 22, 2007	2007	Cincinnati Bearcats	Legion Field	Birmingham, AL	35,258	Jeff Bower	
19	New Orleans Bowl	W 30–27	December 21, 2008	2008	Troy Trojans	Louisiana Superdome	New Orleans, LA	30,197	Larry Fedora	
20	New Orleans Bowl	L 32–42	December 20, 2009	2009	Middle Tennessee Blue Raiders	Louisiana Superdome	New Orleans, LA	30,228	Larry Fedora	
21	Beef 'O' Brady's Bowl	L 28–31	December 21, 2010	2010	Louisville Cardinals	Tropicana Field	St. Petersburg, FL	20,017	Larry Fedora	
22	Hawaii Bowl	W 24–17	December 24, 2011	2011	Nevada Wolf Pack	Aloha Stadium	Halawa, HI	32,630	Larry Fedora	
23	Heart of Dallas Bowl	L 31–44	December 26, 2015	2015	Washington Huskies	Cotton Bowl	Dallas, TX	20,229	Todd Monken	
24	New Orleans Bowl	W 28–21	December 17, 2016	2016	Louisiana–Lafayette Ragin' Cajuns	Mercedes-Benz Superdome	New Orleans, LA	35,061	Jay Hopson	
25	Independence Bowl	L 13–42	December 27, 2017	2017	Florida State Seminoles	Independence Stadium	Shreveport, LA	33,601	Jay Hopson	
26	Armed Forces Bowl	L 13–30	January 4, 2020	2019	Tulane Green Wave	Amon G. Carter Stadium	Fort Worth, TX	38,513	Jay Hopson	
27	LendingTree Bowl	W 38–24	December 17, 2022	2022	Rice Owls	Hancock Whitney Stadium	Mobile, AL		Will Hall	
28	New Orleans Bowl	L 16–27	December 23, 2025	2025	Western Kentucky Hilltoppers	Caesars Superdome	New Orleans, LA		Blake Anderson	
