= Rivalry in Dixie =

American college football rivalry

- Louisiana Tech Bulldogs Southern Miss Golden Eagles
- Sport: Football
- First meeting: November 28, 1935; Louisiana Tech, 27–0
- Latest meeting: November 14, 2026; Louisiana Tech, 63–31
- Next meeting: 2027

Statistics
- Total meetings: 55
- All-time series: Southern Miss leads, 36–19
- Largest victory: Southern Miss, 52–0 (1952)
- Longest win streak: Southern Miss, 9 (1950–1958)
- Current win streak: Louisiana Tech, 2 (2025–present)

Locations of Louisiana Tech and Southern Miss

Rivalry in Dixie is the name given to the Louisiana Tech–Southern Miss football rivalry. It is a college football rivalry game between the Louisiana Tech Bulldogs and Southern Miss Golden Eagles.

== History ==
Louisiana Tech won the first game of the series 27–0 on November 28, 1935. La Tech and USM were conference foes in the Southern Intercollegiate Athletic Association from 1935 to 1941. In addition, La Tech and USM were both founding members of the Gulf States Conference, which began play in 1948. The two football programs competed against each other every season from 1946 to 1972.

The Bulldogs and Golden Eagles played 11 times from 1975 to 1992. The name of the rivalry was coined by Mississippi Southern alumnus and Louisiana Tech head football coach Maxie Lambright. Following the Bulldogs' 23–22 victory over the Golden Eagles in 1976, Lambright declared, "This is the finest rivalry in Dixie." Thereafter, the event became known as "Rivalry in Dixie."

The word "Dixie" refers to privately issued currency from banks in Louisiana. These banks issued ten-dollar notes, labeled "Dix", French for "ten", on the reverse side. The notes were known as "Dixies" by English-speaking southerners, and the area around New Orleans and the French-speaking parts of Louisiana came to be known as "Dixieland". Eventually, usage of the term broadened to refer to most of the Southern United States.

Southern Miss is known for the "World-Famous Dixie Darlings." The USM dance team was established in 1954 as the Dixie Maids. However, after only one week of existence, the band director Dr. Raymond Mannoni decided to change their name to the Dixie Darlings after a Mobile reporter remarked "Look at those delightful darlings of Dixie" after seeing the Dixie Darlings perform. The Dixie Darlings debuted at the Mississippi Southern vs. Alabama game in Montgomery on September 17, 1954. Since then, the Dixie Darlings have become a fixture at Golden Eagle football games. In addition, the Pride of Mississippi Marching Band plays "Are You from Dixie?" following the extra point attempt following a Golden Eagle touchdown.

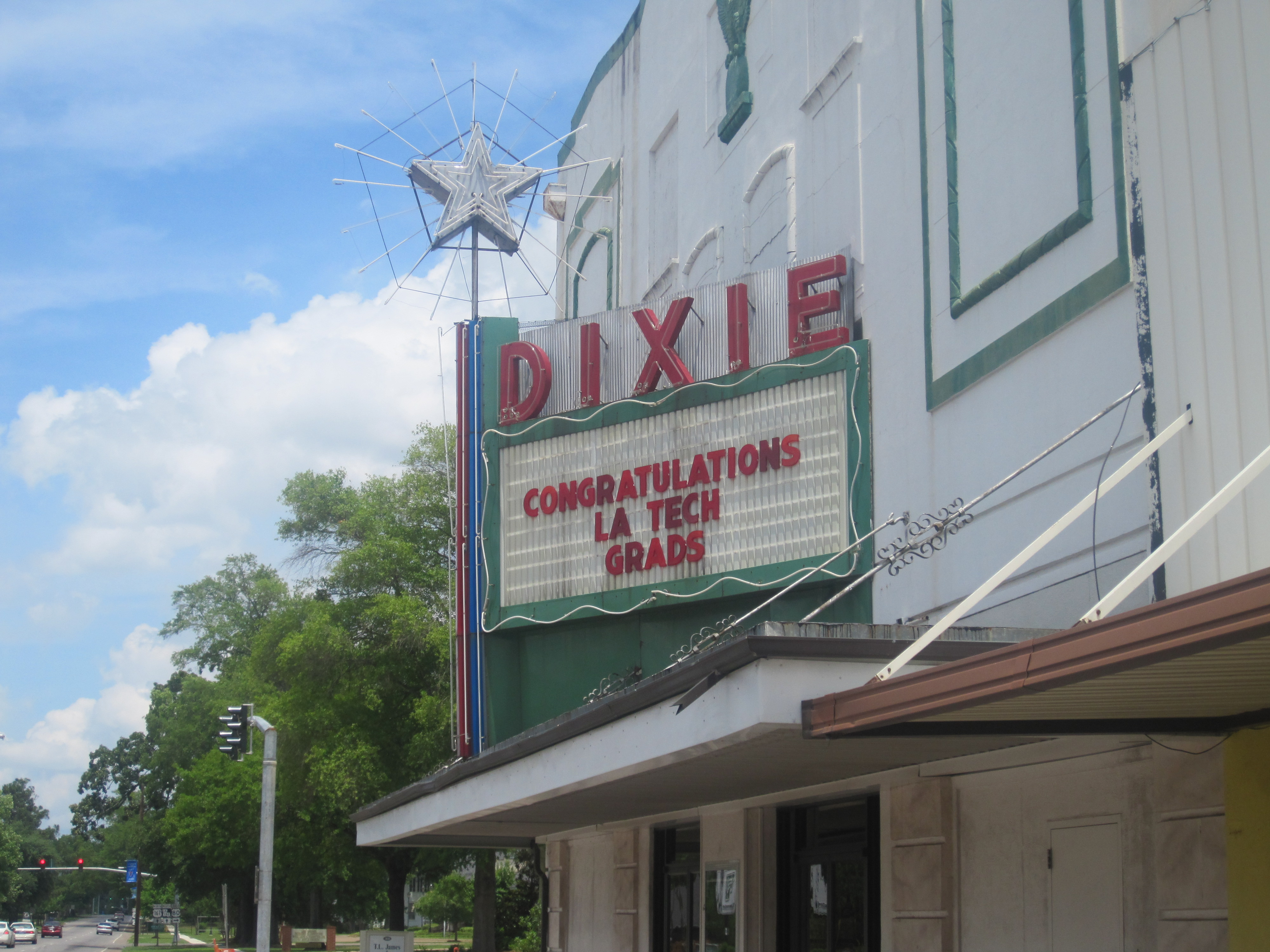
Dixie Theatre in Ruston, Louisiana.

The historic Dixie Theatre is a landmark in the heart of downtown Ruston, Louisiana. The theater was built in 1928 as the Astor Theater and showed films and presented concerts. The theater was renamed in 1932 as the Rialto and become the Dixie Theatre in the 1950s after being purchased by the Dixie Theater Corporation of New Orleans. The famous flashing star crowning the marquee was added in 1956. In 1996, the Dixie Center of the Arts was established to reinstate the Dixie Theatre as a center for entertainment and the arts in downtown Ruston as it hosts full seasons of events, parties, and concerts.

In 2008, La Tech athletics director and head football coach Derek Dooley and USM athletics director Richard Giannini signed a four-game contract to renew the rivalry. Giannini stated, "We look forward to renewing our series with Louisiana Tech, one of our oldest rivalries in terms of games, and a quality opponent in the Western Athletic Conference." In 2010, Southern Miss won the first game of the renewed series, 13–12 on a rainy night in Ruston. The two teams opened their 2011 season in Hattiesburg in spite of heavy rain and high winds from Tropical Storm Lee on Saturday, September 3, 2011, on Fox Sports Net. Southern Miss won a nail-biter 19–17 thanks to a last minute field goal by Danny Hrapmann.

With Louisiana Tech's move to Conference USA in 2013, Rivalry in Dixie is once again a conference rivalry.

On October 26, 2021, USM announced they were leaving Conference USA for the Sun Belt Conference. While the game will no longer be a conference rivalry, future matchups have been scheduled; at Louisiana Tech in 2025, 2029, 2032 and at Southern Miss in 2026, 2031, 2033.

On July 15, 2025, Louisiana Tech announced they will be joining the Sun Belt Conference no later than July 1, 2027. The rivalry continued as a conference game as of the 2026 season.

Currently, Southern Miss leads the series 36–19 over Louisiana Tech.

== Game results ==
Louisiana Tech victories	Southern Miss victories

No.	Date	Location	Winner	Score
1	November 28, 1935	Ruston, LA	Louisiana Tech	27–0
2	October 16, 1936	Ruston, LA	Mississippi State Teachers	12–7
3	October 15, 1937	Ruston, LA	Louisiana Tech	7–0
4	October 3, 1941	Ruston, LA	Mississippi Southern	19–7
5	September 21, 1946	Hattiesburg, MS	Mississippi Southern	7–6
6	October 11, 1947	Ruston, LA	Mississippi Southern	7–6
7	November 13, 1948	Hattiesburg, MS	Mississippi Southern	20–6
8	November 12, 1949	Ruston, LA	Louisiana Tech	34–13
9	November 18, 1950	Hattiesburg, MS	Mississippi Southern	41–20
10	November 17, 1951	Ruston, LA	Mississippi Southern	33–7
11	November 15, 1952	Hattiesburg, MS	Mississippi Southern	52–0
12	November 14, 1953	Ruston, LA	Mississippi Southern	30–0
13	September 25, 1954	Hattiesburg, MS	Mississippi Southern	28–0
14	September 24, 1955	Ruston, LA	Mississippi Southern	7–6
15	September 22, 1956	Hattiesburg, MS	Mississippi Southern	14–0
16	September 21, 1957	Ruston, LA	Mississippi Southern	7–0
17	September 20, 1958	Hattiesburg, MS	Mississippi Southern	14–0
18	November 28, 1959	Ruston, LA	Louisiana Tech	16–0
19	November 12, 1960	Hattiesburg, MS	Louisiana Tech	10–7
20	November 11, 1961	Ruston, LA	Mississippi Southern	7–0
21	November 17, 1962	Hattiesburg, MS	Southern Miss	29–18
22	November 16, 1963	Ruston, LA	Louisiana Tech	10–0
23	November 14, 1964	Hattiesburg, MS	Southern Miss	14–7
24	November 13, 1965	Ruston, LA	Southern Miss	31–7
25	September 17, 1966	Hattiesburg, MS	Southern Miss	14–0
26	November 23, 1967	Shreveport, LA	Southern Miss	58–7
27	November 2, 1968	Hattiesburg, MS	Louisiana Tech	27–20
28	November 1, 1969	Ruston, LA	Southern Miss	24–23

No.	Date	Location	Winner	Score
29	November 14, 1970	Hattiesburg, MS	Louisiana Tech	27–6
30	November 13, 1971	Ruston, LA	Southern Miss	24–20
31	September 16, 1972	Hattiesburg, MS	Louisiana Tech	33–14
32	October 25, 1975	Ruston, LA	Southern Miss	24–14
33	November 13, 1976	Ruston, LA	Louisiana Tech	23–22
34	November 12, 1977	Hattiesburg, MS	Louisiana Tech	28–10
35	September 20, 1980	Hattiesburg, MS	Southern Miss	38–11
36	November 20, 1982	Hattiesburg, MS	Louisiana Tech	13–6
37	September 17, 1983	Hattiesburg, MS	Southern Miss	28–10
38	September 15, 1984	Hattiesburg, MS	Southern Miss	34–0
39	September 7, 1985	Hattiesburg, MS	Southern Miss	28–0
40	November 12, 1988	Ruston, LA	Southern Miss	26–19
41	November 16, 1991	Ruston, LA	Louisiana Tech	30–14
42	September 19, 1992	Hattiesburg, MS	Southern Miss	16–13
43	September 25, 2010	Ruston, LA	Southern Miss	13–12
44	September 3, 2011	Hattiesburg, MS	Southern Miss	19–17
45	November 9, 2013	Ruston, LA	Louisiana Tech	36–13
46	October 25, 2014	Hattiesburg, MS	Louisiana Tech	31–20
47	November 28, 2015	Ruston, LA	Southern Miss	58–24
48	November 26, 2016	Hattiesburg, MS	Southern Miss	39–24
49	October 21, 2017	Ruston, LA	Southern Miss	34–27^{2OT}
50	November 17, 2018	Hattiesburg, MS	Southern Miss	21–20
51	October 19, 2019	Ruston, LA	Louisiana Tech	45–30
52	September 19, 2020	Hattiesburg, MS	Louisiana Tech	31–30
53	November 19, 2021	Ruston, LA	Southern Miss	35–19
54	September 20, 2025	Ruston, LA	Louisiana Tech	30–20
55	November 14, 2026	Ruston, LA	Louisiana Tech	63–31
Series: Southern Miss leads 36–19

== See also ==
- List of NCAA college football rivalry games
