= Renasant Stadium =

American football stadium

- "The Rock"
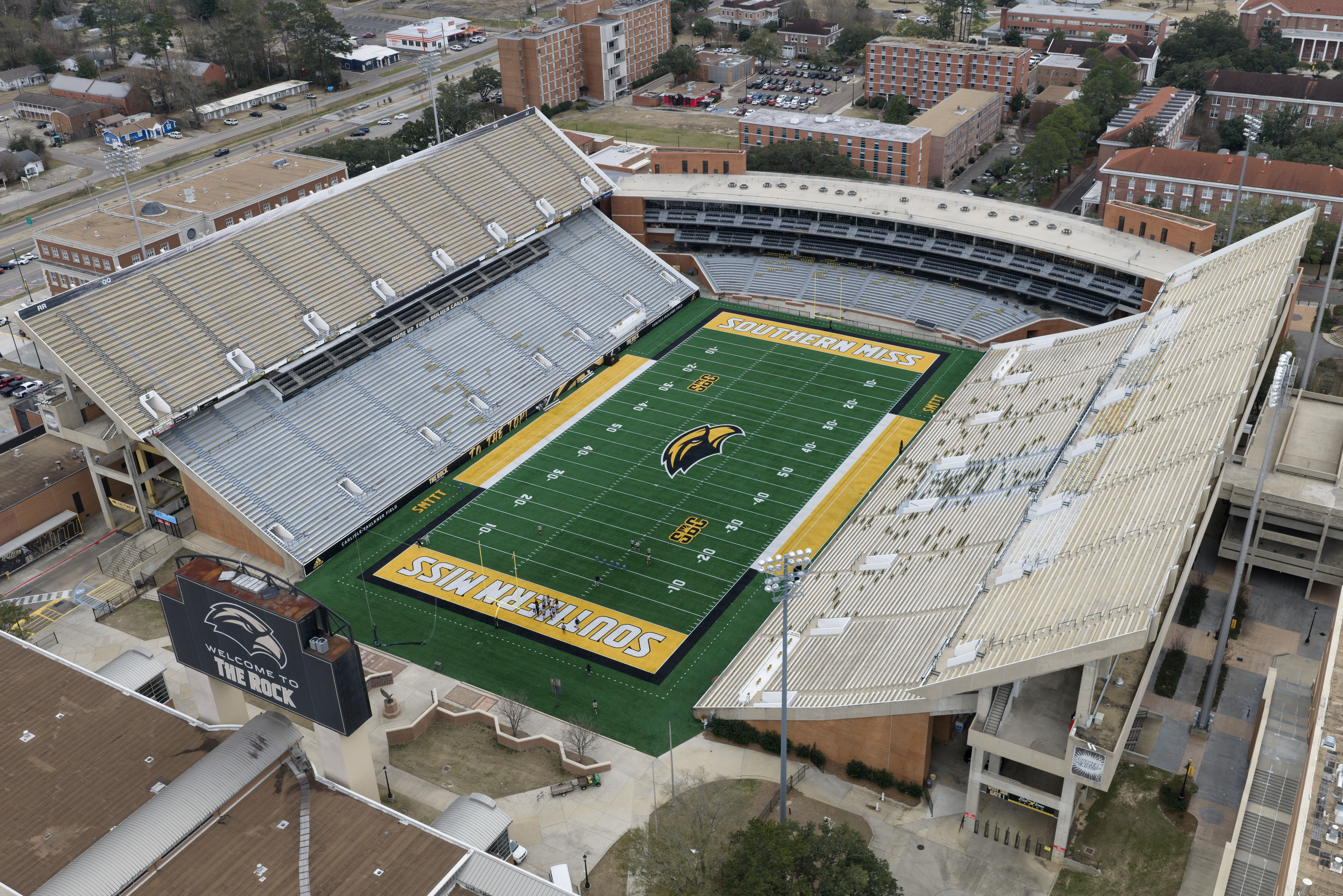
- The stadium in 2026

- Location in Mississippi Location in the United States
- Former names: Faulkner Field (1932–1975); M. M. Roberts Stadium (1975–2026)
- Location: 118 College Drive; Hattiesburg, MS 39406
- Coordinates: 31°19′44″N 89°19′53″W
- Owner: University of Southern Mississippi
- Operator: University of Southern Mississippi
- Capacity: 36,000 (2008–present); 33,000 (1976–2007); 15,000 (1950–1975); 10,000 (1939–1949); 4,000 (1932–1938)
- Surface: Shaw Sports Momentum Turf
- Record attendance: 36,641 (September 5, 2015 vs Mississippi State)

Construction
- Groundbreaking: 1932
- Opened: October 29, 1932
- Renovated: 1976, 1989, 2002, 2008
- Expanded: 1939, 1950, 1976, 2008
- Cost: $0 (original) $6.3 million (1976 renovation) $31.9 million (2008 renovation)
- Architects: Heery and Heery; JH&H Architects (renovation)

Tenant
- Southern Miss Golden Eagles (NCAA) (1932–present)

Renasant Stadium, also known as "The Rock", is an American football stadium located in Hattiesburg, Mississippi. It is the home of The University of Southern Mississippi Golden Eagles football team.

== History ==
The stadium was originally opened on October 29, 1932 as "Faulkner Field", with a wooden grandstand which held 4,000 spectators at the time. It was named for local businessman L.E. Faulkner, who financed the materials and equipment for the stadium, which was built for free by local unemployed workers during the Great Depression. In 1938, permanent concrete stands which also housed dormitory space for student-athletes were built on the east side of the field, with the help of Southern Miss football players hauling the concrete. It was from this (hauling concrete blocks) that the stadium received the nickname "The Rock" (in reference to prison work crews—none of which were used to build the stadium).

The stadium was expanded again in 1950, when the 7,500-seat West Stadium Dormitory stands were built for $350,000. Later, 2,000 bleacher seats were added, as well as new lights (the stadium had lights as early as 1934) and a new scoreboard. By the end of this expansion, the stadium seated 15,000.

On September 5, 2015, the attendance record of 36,641 was set in the 2015 season opener against Mississippi State.

Renasant Bank acquired the naming rights to the stadium in 2026 on a deal worth $13.7 million, renaming it "Resenant Stadium".

=== Renovations ===
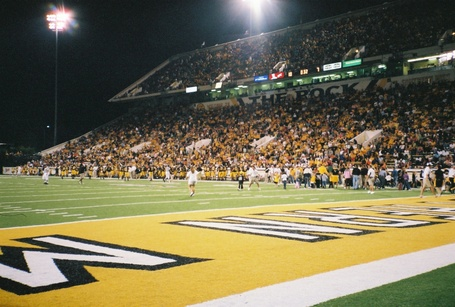
View from the field during a game in 2006

In 1974–76, the stadium was rebuilt at a total cost of $6.3 million, with two sets of double-decked grandstands constructed on either side (east and west stands), bringing seating capacity to 33,000. This forced the Golden Eagles to play their entire 1975 schedule away from Hattiesburg, with eight of 11 games in opponents' stadiums. The "home" games were played in New Orleans (at the new Louisiana Superdome), Jackson and Biloxi.

The stadium was renamed for M. M. Roberts, an alumnus of then-Mississippi College and member of the Board of Trustees of State Institutions of Higher Learning (popularly called "The College Board"). He is credited for helping to build the school up to its current university status, the largest such school in Mississippi south of Starkville. As a member of The College Board, Roberts was a staunch segregationist and attempted to prevent the Mississippi State basketball team from playing integrated Loyola University team in the NCAA tournament saying that such an integrated game would be "the greatest challenge to our way of life since Reconstruction". (However, the playing surface is still known as Faulkner Field.) It was opened on September 25, 1976 with a loss at the hands of in-State rival Ole Miss.

In 1989, the current press box was added. Other improvements to the stadium include the Southern Miss Athletic Center, a field house and athletics training facility opened in 2002 in the north end zone, new lighting towers (for enhanced lighting of televised games), as well as the new Momentum Turf field added in 2004.

The playing field at Roberts Stadium underwent a name change in the 2004 summer when it was renamed Carlisle-Faulkner Field at M.M. Roberts Stadium in honor of entrepreneur, Southern Miss graduate and Golden Eagle supporter, Gene Carlisle, who provided outstanding support and contribution to the Athletics Department and the University – much of which went to the installation of a new playing surface – Momentum Turf by Sportexe.

In 2008, the university opened an addition to the stadium that encloses the south end zone, adding nearly 4,000 seats and 33 specialty suites. The expansion included luxury boxes as well as a new scoreboard in the North Endzone and premium seating and a club level on the east side of the stadium. The Pride of Mississippi Marching Band sits in the student section seating of the stadium.

== See also ==
- List of NCAA Division I FBS football stadiums
