= Carolina Classic Fair =

Agricultural fair in Winston-Salem, North Carolina

- Genre: Agricultural fair
- Frequency: Annually
- Venue: Winston-Salem Fairgrounds
- Location: Winston-Salem, North Carolina
- Coordinates: 36.124565°N 80.253754°W
- Country: United States
- Inaugurated: August 26, 1882 (as the Wheat Fair)
- Attendance: 371,219 (2007 record)
- Organizer: City of Winston-Salem
- Website: carolinaclassicfair.com

The Carolina Classic Fair, formerly the Dixie Classic Fair, is an annual agricultural fair held each autumn at the Winston-Salem Fairgrounds in Winston-Salem, North Carolina. Owned and operated by the City of Winston-Salem, the fair includes agricultural and livestock competitions, creative and culinary exhibits, midway rides and games, grandstand events, and live entertainment.

The fair traces its origins to the Wheat Fair, held at Pace Warehouse in 1882. It moved to its present fairgrounds in 1951 and was renamed the Dixie Classic Fair for Northwest North Carolina in 1956. For several decades, separate fairs for white and Black attendees were held in Winston-Salem; the Dixie Classic Fair integrated in 1963, and the separate Carolina Fair was last held in 1968. Following public debate over the term "Dixie", the city adopted the Carolina Classic Fair name in 2019 for use beginning in 2020. The 2020 fair was canceled because of the COVID-19 pandemic.

== History ==
=== Origins and early fairgrounds ===
The fair traces its origins to a wheat exhibition known as the Wheat Fair, held at Pace Warehouse on August 26, 1882, with 28 exhibitors. During the late 1890s, the local fair tradition expanded through events including the Winston Tobacco Fair in 1897 and the Piedmont Tobacco Fair in 1898. These events were followed by county fairs held at Piedmont Park.

In late 1908, the event was known as the Winston-Salem Forsyth County Fair and was held at a new Piedmont Park site on Liberty Street, where it remained through 1950. Charles H. Babcock offered land for new fairgrounds in 1949, and the event was renamed the Fair of Winston-Salem in 1950.

=== Present fairgrounds and integration ===
The fair moved to its present site in 1951. In 1956, it was renamed the Dixie Classic Fair for Northwest North Carolina.

Separate fairs for white and Black attendees had been held in Winston-Salem since at least the late 1930s and continued after the move to the present fairgrounds. The Western Carolina Colored Fair generally followed the fair for white attendees by one week, using the same grounds. After the Western Carolina Colored Fair dissolved, the Carolina Colored Fair, later known as the Carolina Fair, was established in 1953. The Dixie Classic Fair integrated in 1963; attendance at the Carolina Fair subsequently declined, and it was last held in 1968.

=== City operation and modern era ===
In late 1969, the Winston-Salem Foundation transferred the fairgrounds and $75,000 in accumulated funds to the City of Winston-Salem. The city also created the Fair and Coliseum Commission and thereafter operated the fairgrounds under an enterprise system, with fair revenues used to cover operating expenses and debt service.

In 2019, the city solicited public input on whether to retain the name through an online survey, public phone line, and public meeting. By May 15, the survey had received 9,642 responses, approximately 84 percent of which favored retaining the existing name. Speakers at the public meeting argued both for and against a change. Those supporting a change cited associations of the term "Dixie" with the Confederacy, slavery, and racial segregation.

The Winston-Salem City Council voted 6–2 in October 2019 to rename the event the Carolina Classic Fair beginning in 2020. Council member D. D. Adams said the new name combined elements of the names used by the city's formerly segregated fairs. The rebranding was expected to cost $97,000 for new signs and banners.

The 2020 fair was canceled because of the COVID-19 pandemic. Organizers instead held a drive-through food event at the fairgrounds and presented a virtual exhibit.

== Fair program ==
The fair holds competitions and exhibits in agriculture, creative and culinary arts, flowers, livestock, poultry and pigeons, special foods, and wine. James E. Strates Shows has served as the fair's midway provider since 1964. The fair also presents grandstand events and live entertainment throughout the fairgrounds.

== Attendance ==
The fair set an attendance record of 371,219 in 2007; its organizers reported that the total ranked it as the 50th-largest fair in North America that year.

Attendance totaled 270,190 in 2023 and 264,203 in 2024. The 2025 fair drew 251,213 attendees.
