= Are You from Dixie ('Cause I'm from Dixie Too) =

1916 song by George L. Cobb and Jack Yellen

"Are You From Dixie ('Cause I'm from Dixie Too)"

Single by Jerry Reed

from the album Jerry Reed Explores Guitar Country
- B-side: "A Worried Man"
- Released: August 4, 1969
- Genre: Country
- Length: 2:12
- Label: RCA Victor
- Songwriters: Jack Yellen, George L. Cobb
- Producer: Chet Atkins

Jerry Reed singles chronology
"There's Better Things in Life" (1969)	"Are You From Dixie ('Cause I'm from Dixie Too)" (1969)	"Talk About the Good Times" (1970)

1916 recording by Billy Murray

Are You From Dixie ('Cause I'm from Dixie Too) is a song written by lyricist Jack Yellen and composer George L. Cobb, who teamed up to create several Vaudeville-era songs celebrating the American South. It was originally recorded by Billy Murray in 1915.

The song has been covered by many pop and country artists. One of the most successful recordings was by American country music artist Jerry Reed. His version was released in August 1969 as the only single from his album, Jerry Reed Explores Guitar Country. The song reached a peak of #11 on the U.S. Billboard Hot Country Singles chart.

The song is part of tradition at the University of Southern Mississippi. It is regularly played as a part of the Pride of Mississippi Marching Band's repertoire, being played after every extra point in a Southern Miss Golden Eagles football game.

== Chart performance ==
Chart (1969)	Peak position
U.S. Billboard Hot Country Singles	11

== Other versions ==
- Joe Bennett and the Sparkletones released a version of the song as a single in 1960.
- Grandpa Jones recorded his version in 1965.
