= Brian Balazik =

American football player

Profile
- Position: Quarterback

Personal information
- Listed height: 6 ft 1 in (1.85 m)
- Listed weight: 210 lb (95 kg)

Career information
- College: Southern Mississippi

Career history
- Montgomery Maulers (2005); Birmingham Steeldogs (2005); Team Alabama (2008)

Brian Balazik is an American former football quarterback.

== College career ==
Balazik lettered in football at University of Southern Mississippi, only seeing action while backing-up Lee Roberts his senior season, completing 1-of-2 passes for 6 yards and rushing once for −2 yards in two games, one a 42–24 win on October 4, 1997, against Louisville and the other a 33–0 win against Houston. He inexplicably graduated, though, from University of Montevallo.

== Professional career ==
A part of the expansion Montgomery Maulers's inaugural 2005 season in the National Indoor Football League, where the Mauler’s won the Atlantic Conference Central Division Championship.

Balazik was the only quarterback protected by Team Alabama for the 2008 All-American Football League draft.

In July 2009, Balazik accepted the position the head football coach at Oak Mountain Middle School. This school is the feeder for Oak Mountain High School which is a Division 6a Region 6 high school near Oak Mountain, Alabama.

== Sources ==
- sportsillustrated.cnn.com
- http://www.oursportscentral.com/services/releases/?id=3135659
- http://www.al.com/sports/birminghamnews/index.ssf?/base/sports/121585052738110.xml&coll=2&thispage=1
