= Dixie =

Nickname for the Southern United States

Coordinates: 34°N 86°W

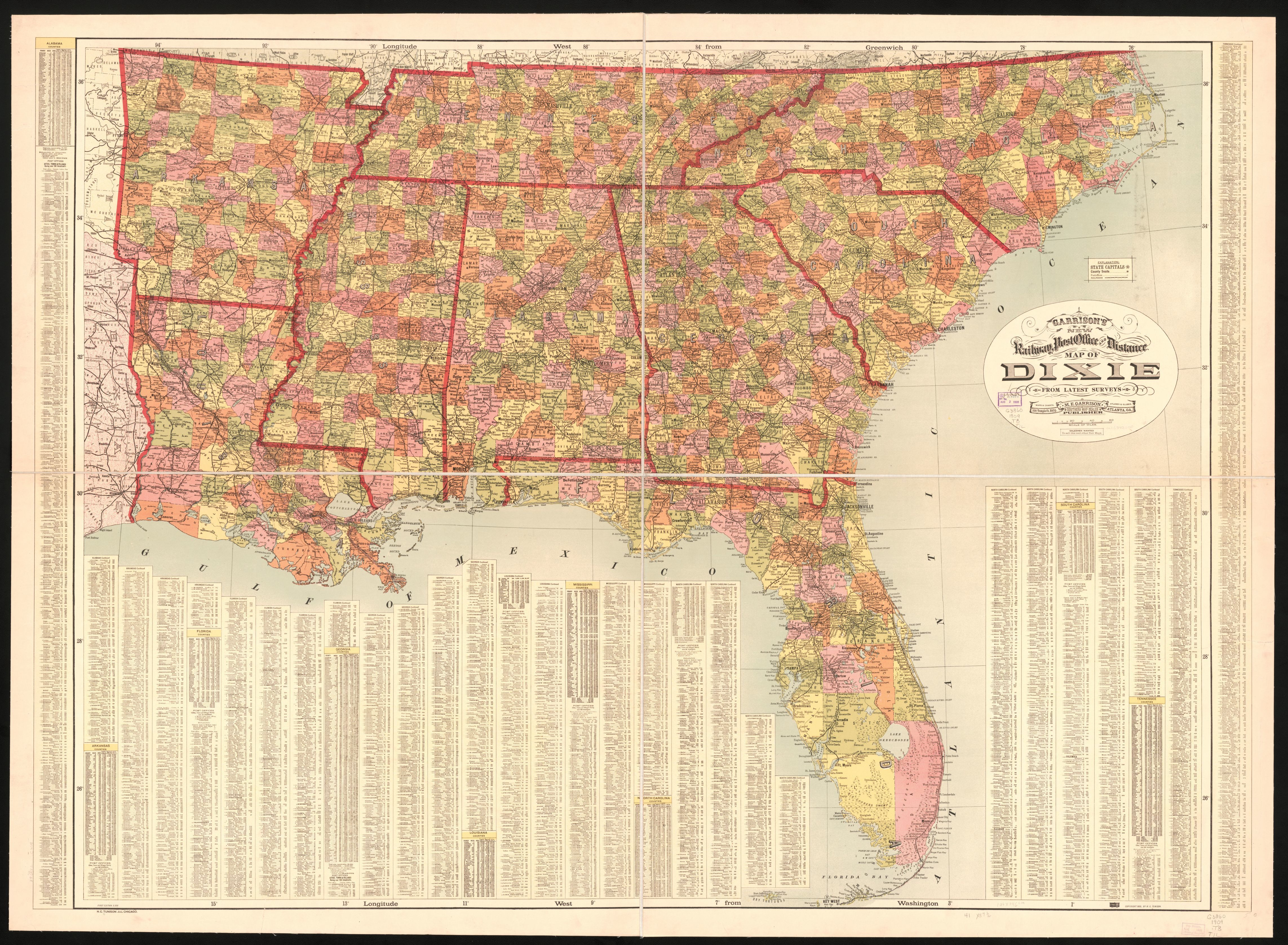
M. E. Garrison's Map of Dixie published in 1909. This version of Dixie only includes states within the Southeast, omitting traditionally included states such as Texas.

Dixie, also known as Dixieland or Dixie's Land, is a nickname for all or part of the Southern United States. While there is no official definition of this region (and the included areas have shifted over the years), or the extent of the area it covers, most definitions include the U.S. states below the Mason–Dixon line that seceded and composed the Confederate States of America, including all the Deep South. The term became popularized throughout the United States by songs that nostalgically referred to the American South.

== Region ==
Geographically, Dixie usually means the cultural region of the Southern states. However, definitions of Dixie vary greatly. Dixie may include only the Deep South (Alabama, Mississippi, South Carolina, etc.) or the states that seceded during the American Civil War.

"Dixie" states in the modern sense usually refer to:

1. South Carolina
2. Mississippi
3. Florida
4. Alabama
5. Georgia
6. Louisiana
7. Texas
8. Virginia
9. Arkansas
10. Tennessee
11. North Carolina
12. Oklahoma
13. Kentucky
14. Missouri
15. Maryland

Kentucky has a strong southern culture, and self-identifies as part of Dixie. Although Maryland is not often considered part of Dixie today, it is below the Mason–Dixon line. If the origin of the term Dixie is accepted as referring to the region south and west of that line (this excludes Delaware, which was a slave state in 1861), Maryland lies within Dixie. It can be argued that Maryland was part of Dixie before the Civil War, especially culturally. In this sense, it would remain so into the 1970s, until an influx of people from the Northeast made the state and its culture less Southern (especially Baltimore and the suburbs of Washington, D.C.). Southern Maryland and the Eastern Shore still remain culturally Southern and share many traits associated with Dixie.

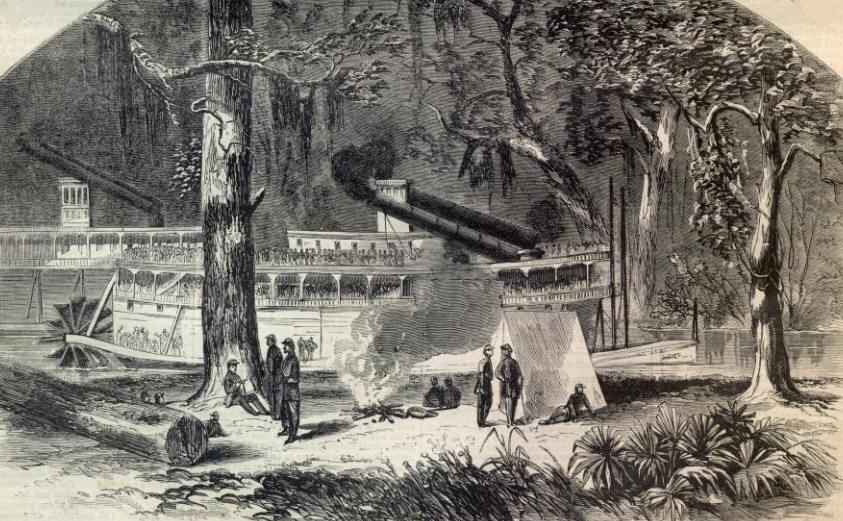
Bayou Navigation in Dixie, engraving of a Louisiana steamboat, 1863

As for the nation's capital itself: "Whether Washington should be defined as a Southern city has been a debate since the Civil War, when it was the seat of the Northern government but a hotbed of rebel sympathy", the Washington Post wrote in 2011. "The Washington area's 'Southernness' has fallen into steep decline, part of a trend away from strongly held regional identities. In the 150th anniversary year of the start of the Civil War, the region at the heart of the conflict has little left of its historic bond with Dixie." President Kennedy complained about the worst aspects of Washington's Northern and Southern influence, calling Washington, D.C., "a city of Southern efficiency and Northern charm".

The Florida Big Bend includes a Dixie County. Certain parts of Oklahoma and Missouri that are considered more culturally Southern than the rest of these two states have been nicknamed Little Dixie (Oklahoma) and Little Dixie (Missouri).

The location and boundaries of Dixie have become increasingly subjective and mercurial. Today, Dixie is most often associated with parts of the Southern United States where traditions and legacies of the Confederate era and the Antebellum South live most strongly. The concept of Dixie as the location of a certain set of cultural assumptions, mindsets, and traditions was explored in the book The Nine Nations of North America (1981).

== Etymology ==
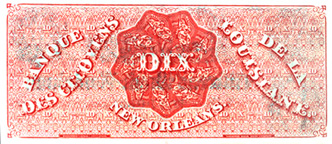
Ten-dollar note from Banque des citoyens de la Louisiane, 1860

According to the Oxford English Dictionary, the origin of this nickname remains obscure. The most common theories, according to A Dictionary of Americanisms on Historical Principles (1951) by Mitford M. Mathews include the following:

- Dixie may be derived from Jeremiah Dixon, one of the surveyors of the Mason–Dixon line, which defined the border between Maryland and Pennsylvania, separating free and slave states prior to the Missouri Compromise. Jonathan Lighter, the editor of the Historical Dictionary of American Slang, connects the terms Mason–Dixon line and Dixie via a children's game played in nineteenth century New York City.
- Dixie may have originally referred to currency issued first by the Citizens State Bank in the French Quarter of New Orleans and then by other banks in Louisiana. These banks issued ten-dollar notes labeled dix (pronounced [dis]), French for 'ten', on the reverse side. The notes were known as Dixies by Southerners, and the area around New Orleans and the French-speaking parts of Louisiana came to be known as Dixieland. Eventually, usage of the term broadened to refer to the Southern states in general.
- Another suggestion is that Dixie preserves the name of Johan Dixie (sometimes spelled Dixy), a slave owner from Manhattan. According to a story recounted in Word Myths: Debunking Linguistic Urban Legends (2008), slaves owned by Dixie were later sold in the South, where they spoke of better treatment while working on Dixie's land. There is no evidence that this story is true.

== Uses of the term ==
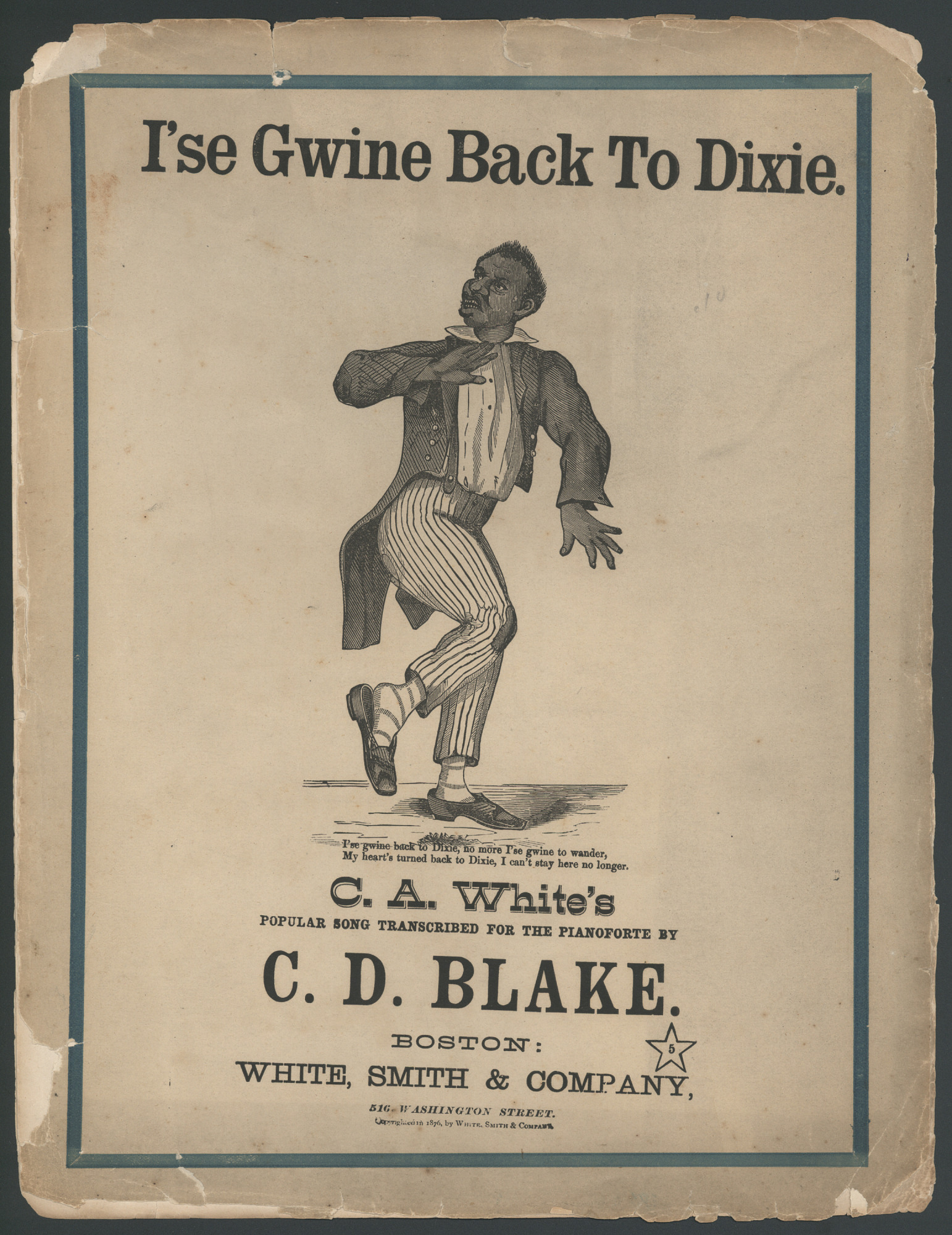
C.D. Blake's I'se Gwine Back To Dixie and other similar songs included the usage of Dixie nostalgically.

During the Jazz Age and the American folk music revival, "Dixie" was used widely in popular music such as "Swanee", "Are You From Dixie?", "Is It True What They Say About Dixie?" and, in the era of rock and roll, "The Night They Drove Old Dixie Down" and "Dixieland Delight". The first popular song to contain "Dixie" in its name was "I Wish I Was In Dixie", composed in 1859 and incorporated as an unofficial anthem of the Confederate States of America.

In terms of self-identification and appeal, the popularity of the word Dixie is declining. A 1976 study revealed that in an area of the South covering about 350,000 square miles (all of Mississippi and Alabama; almost all of Georgia, Tennessee, and South Carolina; and around half of Louisiana, Arkansas, Kentucky, North Carolina, and Florida) the term reached 25% of the popularity of the term American in names of commercial business entities. A 1999 analysis found that between 1976 and 1999, in 19% of U.S. cities sampled, there was an increase of relative use of Dixie; in 48% of cities sampled, there was a decline; and no change was recorded in 32% of cities. A 2010 study found that in the course of 40 years, the area in question shrank to just 40,000 square miles (100,000 km^{2}), to the area where Louisiana, Mississippi, Alabama, and Florida meet. In 1976, at about 600,000 square miles (1,600,000 km^{2}) (Note: from eastern Texas and Oklahoma to southern Missouri, Illinois, Indiana, Ohio, West Virginia and Virginia)

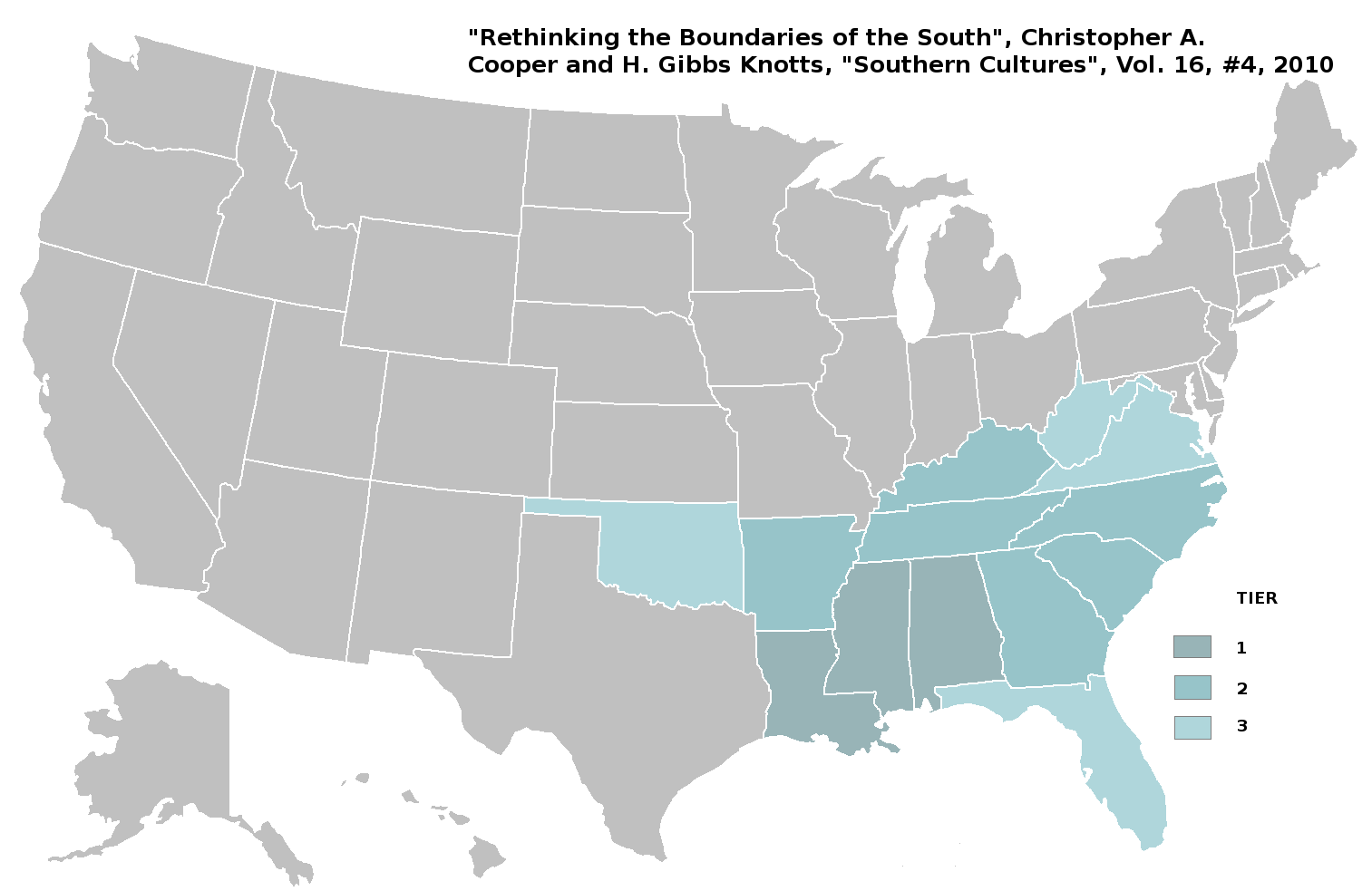
Southern United States by Christopher A. Cooper and H. Gibbs Knotts

Sociologists Christopher A. Cooper and H. Gibbs Knotts surveyed all 50 states and the District of Columbia for the use of the words "Dixie" and "Southern" in business names. Unlike the survey conducted by John Shelton Reed, who concentrated on cities, Cooper and Knotts surveyed entire states using modern technology rather than the physical search of telephone books that were available to Reed. They excluded the chain Winn-Dixie from the study. Their data, within these parameters, resulted in a 13-state region which they divided into three tiers, from high to low scores. In the first tier were Alabama, Louisiana and Mississippi. The second tier was Arkansas, Georgia, Kentucky, North Carolina, South Carolina, and Tennessee. The third tier was Florida, Oklahoma, Virginia, and West Virginia.

In 1965, the Washington Redskins ceased playing the song Dixie after a Black fan wrote to the owner of the team asking for it to be stopped.

In the 21st century, several groups or organizations changed their names, removing "Dixie" due to its association with the Confederacy. They included Dolly Parton's Dixie Stampede, the music group Dixie Chicks, and the Dixie Classic Fair. The board of trustees at Dixie State University in Utah voted unanimously in December 2020 to change the name of the institution, with the Utah Legislature putting "Utah Tech University" into effect in 2022 to distance the university from the "Dixie" term.

== See also ==
- Bible Belt
- "Dixie" (song)
- Dixie (Utah)
- Dixie Alley, a nickname for a portion of the southern United States that sees frequent tornadoes
- Dixiecrat
- Dixie Chicks comments on George W. Bush
- Heart of Dixie
- Dixie Highway
- Dixie Kong
- Dixie Road
