= Winston-Salem Fairgrounds =

Event complex in Winston-Salem, North Carolina

Coordinates: 36.124565°N 80.253754°W

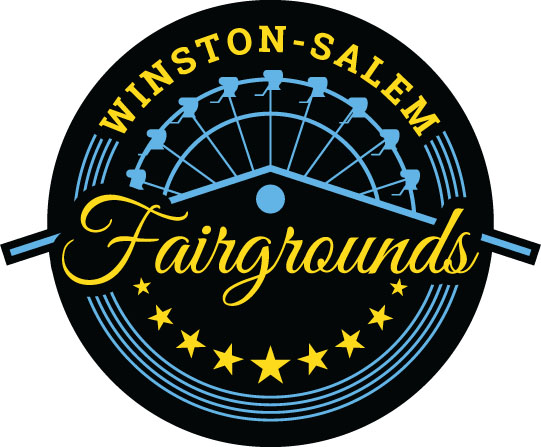
- Fairgrounds logo
- Interactive map of Winston-Salem Fairgrounds
- Location: Winston-Salem, North Carolina
- Owner: City of Winston-Salem
- Type: Fairgrounds and event complex
- Event: Carolina Classic Fair
- Facilities: Fairgrounds Arena; Event Center; Home & Garden Building; Grandstand; Fairgrounds Farmers Market
- Acreage: Approximately 70 acres (28 ha)

Construction
- Opened: 1951

Website
- wsfairgrounds.com

The Winston-Salem Fairgrounds is a city-owned event complex in Winston-Salem, North Carolina. The roughly 70-acre (28 ha) property is used throughout the year and is home to the annual Carolina Classic Fair. The fair moved to the present site in 1951. A former 0.5-mile (0.80 km) dirt oval at the site hosted two NASCAR Grand National Series races in 1955, both won by Lee Petty.

== Site and facilities ==
The complex includes the Fairgrounds Arena, Event Center, Home & Garden Building, Grandstand, and Fairgrounds Farmers Market. The city's Public Assembly Facilities Commission oversees the fairgrounds.

== History ==
In 1908, the fair moved to a new Piedmont Park site at Liberty and 28th streets, where it remained through 1950. In November 1949, Charles H. Babcock offered land without charge for a new fairgrounds site near the Cherry Street Extension and 30th Street. The fair's board accepted the offer, and planning began for the construction of the new grounds.

The annual event was renamed the Fair of Winston-Salem in 1950, and the first fair at the present grounds was held in 1951. In 1956, it was renamed the Dixie Classic Fair for Northwest North Carolina.

In 1969, the Winston-Salem Foundation transferred the fairgrounds property and $75,000 in accumulated funds to the City of Winston-Salem. In January 2014, the Public Assembly Facilities Commission approved the Winston-Salem Fairgrounds name for the year-round complex. In October 2019, the Winston-Salem City Council voted to rename the annual event the Carolina Classic Fair beginning in 2020.

== Former racetrack ==
The present fairgrounds formerly included a 0.5-mile (0.80 km) dirt oval. The oval hosted two 100-mile (160 km) NASCAR Grand National Series races in 1955, on May 29 and August 7; Lee Petty won both.
