= Southern Miss Golden Eagles football =

Football team of the University of Southern Mississippi

2026 Southern Miss Golden Eagles football team
- First season: 1912; 114 years ago
- Athletic director: Jeremy McClain
- Head coach: Blake Anderson; 1st season, 1–4 (.200)
- Location: Hattiesburg, Mississippi
- Stadium: Renasant Stadium (capacity: 36,000)
- NCAA division: Division I FBS
- Conference: Sun Belt
- Division: West
- Colors: Black and gold
- All-time record: 622–476–26 (.565)
- Bowl record: 12–13 (.480)

Small college national championships
- 1958, 1962

Conference championships
- GSC: 1948, 1950, 1951 C-USA: 1996, 1997, 1999, 2003, 2011

Division championships
- C-USA East: 2006, 2011 C-USA West: 2015
- Rivalries: Louisiana Tech (rivalry); Memphis (rivalry); Tulane (rivalry)

Uniforms
- Fight song: Southern Miss to the Top
- Mascot: Seymour d'Campus
- Marching band: Pride of Mississippi
- Outfitter: Adidas
- Website: SouthernMiss.com

The Southern Miss Golden Eagles football program represents the University of Southern Mississippi in Hattiesburg, Mississippi. They play college football in the NCAA Division I Football Bowl Subdivision. The Eagles are currently members of the Sun Belt Conference and play their home games at Renasant Stadium in Hattiesburg, Mississippi.

== History ==
=== Early history (1912–1974) ===
Southern Miss first fielded a football team in 1912, coached by Ronald Slay. That team posted a 2–1 record. A. B. Dille coached the Golden Eagles from 1914 to 1916, posting a record of 6–10–1. USM did not field a football team from 1917 to 1919 because of World War I. Allison Hubert was the Golden Eagles head football coach for six seasons, posting a 26–24–5 record. His Golden Eagles teams were known to be fast and fierce. Hubert departed after the 1936 season to accept the head football coach position at VMI. After Hubert came Reed Green, who coached USM for a total of nine years, from 1937 to 1942 and 1946 to 1948. His final record was 59–20–4. The Golden Eagles did not compete in football from 1943 to 1945 because of World War II. During the coaching tenure of Thad Vann, the Golden Eagles became one of the nation's most elite football programs. Vann compiled a 139–59–2 record, had only one losing season in his 20 seasons in Hattiesburg, his last. His 1953 and 1954 Golden Eagles teams upset Alabama and posted records of 9–2 and 6–4, respectively. The Golden Eagles made it to the Sun Bowl in 1954. Vann's 1958 and 1962 teams claim a national championship. Vann retired after the 1968 season and was inducted into the College Football Hall of Fame as a coach in 1987. P. W. Underwood returned to his alma mater from his post as an assistant coach at Tennessee. Underwood compiled a 31–32–2 record in his six seasons and engineered one of the biggest wins in school history in 1970, a 30–14 upset of fourth-ranked Mississippi.

=== Bobby Collins era (1975–1981) ===
Bobby Collins was the Golden Eagles head football coach for seven seasons, compiling a record of 48–30–2. Collins led the Golden Eagles to two bowl appearances, the Independence Bowl and the Tangerine Bowl after the 1980 and 1981 regular seasons. His 1981 team finished ranked No. 19 in the final Coaches' Poll. Collins left USM after the 1981 season to accept the head football coach position at SMU.

=== Jim Carmody era (1982–1987) ===
Collins was succeeded by his former defensive coordinator Jim Carmody, who coached the Golden Eagles for six seasons. Under Carmody's tutelage, Carmody's Golden Eagles compiled a record of 37–29. Only one of those six seasons did the Golden Eagles finish with a losing record, a 4–7 campaign in 1984. The Golden Eagles would only have one more losing season until 2012.

During Carmody's tenure, the Golden Eagles defeated Alabama, 38–29, in Tuscaloosa in 1982, snapping the Crimson Tide's 56-game home winning streak at Bryant–Denny Stadium. It was the first time since 1962 that Alabama had lost there and also proved to be the final loss of coach Bear Bryant's career. Carmody recruited a young Kiln, Mississippi, high school quarterback named Brett Favre to Southern Miss in 1987. In 1984, Southern Miss, already under NCAA sanctions for prior infractions, admitted to improper recruiting practices pertaining to freshman linebacker Don Palmer. As part of the fallout, Carmody's salary was frozen. Palmer alleged he was given clothing, basketball game tickets, cash, and transportation to the campus by an USM assistant coach.

=== Curley Hallman era (1988–1990) ===
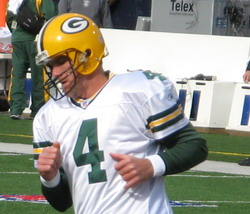
Brett Favre, who played for Curley Hallman at USM

Curley Hallman came to Southern Miss from his post as defensive backs coach at Texas A&M. Hallman's .676 winning percentage at USM is the highest of any coach in Southern Miss football history. Hallman coached future NFL star quarterback Brett Favre during his tenure at USM. Hallman's record at Southern Miss is 23–11 in three seasons. Hallman departed after the 1990 season to accept the head football coach position at LSU.

=== Jeff Bower era (1991–2007) ===
Jeff Bower came back to his alma mater as head football coach following Hallman's departure. Bower led the Golden Eagles to 14 consecutive winning seasons, the fifth longest streak in college football history and to bowl games 10 of his last 11 seasons. Bower's 119 wins are the most by any head coach in USM football history. Bower led the Golden Eagles to three Liberty Bowl appearances (two wins) in 1997, 1999 and 2003. His 1997 and 1999 teams finished ranked in the top 20 of both the AP and Coaches' Polls. Bower also led the Golden Eagles to two New Orleans Bowl victories (2004 and 2005), a GMAC Bowl victory (2006) and a Mobile Alabama Bowl victory (2000). He led the Golden Eagles to three additional bowl appearances. Bower was named Conference USA's "Coach of the Decade" in 2004. Bower resigned after the 2007 season with an overall record of 119–83–1.

=== Larry Fedora era (2008–2011) ===
Larry Fedora was hired away from his post as offensive coordinator at Oklahoma State as the USM head football coach on December 11, 2007. Fedora's four-year contract included a $650,000 per-year base salary, but incentives brought his yearly pay close to $900,000. Fedora made a big splash early in his tenure at USM, landing a commitment from five-star wide receiver prospect DeAndre Brown, who chose the Golden Eagles over offers from SEC members LSU, Ole Miss and Auburn.

In Fedora's first game as head coach, the Golden Eagles set the USM all-time record for yards in a game with 633. Southern Miss would go on to notch its four most explosive offensive seasons in program history in Fedora's four seasons. His players also graduated at the highest rate in USM history. In what turned out to be Fedora's final season, the Golden Eagles upset sixth-ranked and undefeated Houston in the Conference USA championship game en route to a Hawaii Bowl victory and rankings of No. 19 and No. 20 in the final Coaches' and AP Polls, respectively. Fedora also led the Golden Eagles to two New Orleans Bowl appearances (one win, one loss) in his first two seasons and a loss in the Beef O'Brady's Bowl to Louisville in his third. Fedora's record year-by year was back-to-back 7–6 records in 2008 and 2009, 8–5 in 2010 and a USM record 12–2 in 2011. The 2011 season was the first time USM had ever won 12 games in a single season. Fedora left after the 2011 season to accept the head football coach position at North Carolina, leaving Southern Miss with a 34–19 overall record.

=== Ellis Johnson era (2012) ===
Following Fedora's departure, Ellis Johnson was hired as head coach at USM away from South Carolina, where he served as defensive coordinator. A long-time and well-respected defensive coordinator of the SEC and ACC with extensive recruiting ties throughout the South, Johnson's hire was met with praise by most USM fans. However, the Golden Eagles success seen under Johnson's predecessors turned south quickly, as USM went 0–12 in what turned out to be Johnson's only season as head coach. It was USM's first losing season since 1993. The drop from 12–2 to 0–12 is among the largest single season drops in college football history. USM was also the only team in the nation to fail to win a single game in 2012. Fan support and attendance fell, and Johnson was fired after the disastrous season.

=== Todd Monken era (2013–2015) ===
Todd Monken was hired as the head football coach at USM from his post as offensive coordinator at Oklahoma State to turn around the suddenly downtrodden Golden Eagles football program. Monken's Golden Eagles lost their first 11 games of the 2013 season but broke a 23-game losing streak in November 2013, a 62–27 victory over UAB, their first victory since the 2011 Hawaii Bowl, Fedora's final game. After a 3–9 2014 campaign, Southern Miss finally returned to form in 2015, winning Conference USA's West Division and advancing to the conference title game, where the Golden Eagles fell to Western Kentucky. Southern Miss had one of the most productive offenses in college football and finished 2015 with a 9–5 record, including a Heart of Dallas Bowl loss to Washington. After the season, Monken accepted an offer to become the offensive coordinator of the NFL's Tampa Bay Buccaneers.

=== Jay Hopson era (2016–2020) ===
Alcorn State head coach Jay Hopson, a former USM assistant, was hired as the Golden Eagles head coach in January 2016. In his first year at the helm, Hopson led the Golden Eagles to a 7–6 record, a bowl victory, and the first win over an SEC opponent since Jeff Bower's 2000 team, defeating Kentucky in the season opener. Hopson's Eagles secured wins over three teams with winning records, a 50% increase over the prior year. Hopson is the first coach in USM history to defeat an SEC team in his first game coaching and joined Hallman (vs. Mississippi State) and Bower (vs. Auburn) as the only USM coaches to defeat an SEC opponent in their first opportunity.

The Golden Eagles finished 8–5 in 2017. They began the season on September 2, losing to Kentucky by a score of 24–17. One week later, Southern Miss defeated FCS opponent Southern by a score of 45–0. Hopson's squad won their second game of the season in their third contest as they defeated Louisiana-Monroe by a margin of 28–17. On September 30, Southern Miss lost to North Texas by a score of 43–28. That was followed by a 31–29 victory over UTSA. After a 24–0 shutout win over UTEP, the Golden Eagles defeated Louisiana Tech in the Rivalry in Dixie game by a score of 34–27 in double overtime. Hopson's team lost their next two, falling to rival UAB by a score of 30–12 and Tennessee by a margin of 24–10. Southern Miss won their last three games to close the regular season, defeating Rice by a score of 43–34, Charlotte by a margin of 66–21 and Marshall by a nail biting 28–27. Southern Miss accepted a berth in the 2017 Independence Bowl, a game they lost to Florida State by a score of 42–13. They lost to Tulane in the Armed Forces Bowl in January 2020. After a surprising early season loss to South Alabama 32–21 in Hattiesburg, Jay Hopson unexpectedly resigned the following Monday. Athletic Director Jeremy McClain announced that Co-Offensive Coordinator and WR coach Scotty Walden would take over as interim head coach.

=== Will Hall era (2020–2024) ===
Will Hall, former offensive coordinator at the University of Louisiana-Lafayette and Tulane, was announced as the new head coach of the Golden Eagles in December 2020. His first season, in 2021, was also the program's final year in Conference USA, during which the team went 3–9 (2–6). The following season, Hall’s first in the Sun Belt Conference, the Golden Eagles improved to 7–6 (4–4), including a 38–24 win over Rice in the LendingTree Bowl. The 2023 season, however, saw the Golden Eagles finish 3–9 (2–6). The 2024 season would be Hall’s last. After a 1–6 (0–3) start that included a 31–0 loss to Kentucky, a 44–7 loss to Jacksonville State, and a 44–28 loss to Arkansas State, it was announced that Hall had been relieved of his duties as head coach. Reed Stringer, the team’s assistant head coach and general manager, was named interim head coach for the remainder of the season.

=== Charles Huff era (2025) ===
On December 8, 2024, former Marshall football head coach Charles Huff was named the head coach of the Golden Eagles.. He led the team to its first year of bowl-eligibility since 2022, with a win over Louisiana–Monroe (49–21) on October 25, 2025. On December 8, 2025, one year to the day after becoming the Southern Miss coach, Huff was formally announced as the new coach of the University of Memphis.

=== Blake Anderson era (2026-) ===
On December 11, 2025, Blake Anderson was promoted from offensive coordinator to be the new head coach.

== Conference affiliations ==
- Independent (1912–1930, 1942–1947, 1952–1995)
- Southern Intercollegiate Athletic Association (1931–1941)
- Gulf States Conference (1948–1951)
- Conference USA (1996–2021)
- Sun Belt Conference (2022-)

== Championships ==
=== National championships ===
Season	Coach	Selector	Record
1958	Thad Vann	United Press International – College Division	9–0
1962	Thad Vann	United Press International – College Division	9–1

=== Conference championships ===
Southern Miss has won eight conference championships, seven outright and one shared.

Season	Conference	Coach	Overall Record	Conference Record
1948	Gulf States Conference	Reed Green	7–3	4–0
1950	Gulf States Conference	Thad Vann	5–5	3–1
1951	Gulf States Conference	Thad Vann	6–5	4–0
1996†	Conference USA	Jeff Bower	8–3	4–1
1997	Conference USA	Jeff Bower	9–3	6–0
1999	Conference USA	Jeff Bower	9–3	6–0
2003	Conference USA	Jeff Bower	9–4	8–0
2011	Conference USA	Larry Fedora	12–2	6–2

† Co-champions

=== Division championships ===
Southern Miss has attended three division championships, winning one.

Season	Division	Coach	Opponent	CG result
2006	C-USA East	Jeff Bower	Houston	L 20–34
2011	C-USA East	Larry Fedora	Houston	W 49–28
2015	C-USA West	Todd Monken	WKU	L 28–45

== Head coaches ==
List of Southern Miss head coaches, term, and # of Seasons

- Ronald J. Slay (1912)--1
- Blondie Williams (1913)--1
- A. B. Dille (1914–1916)--3
- No team (1917–1918)
- Cephus Anderson (1919)--1
- B. B. O'Mara (1920)--1
- O. V. Austin (1921–1923)--3
- William Herschel Bobo (1924–1927)--4
- William B. Saunders (1928–1929)--2
- John Lumpkin (1930)--1
- Pooley Hubert (1931–1936)--6
- Reed Green (1937–1942, 1946–1948)--6, 3
- No team (1943–1945)
- Thad Vann (1949–1968)--20
- P. W. Underwood (1969–1974)--6
- Bobby Collins (1975–1981)--7
- Jim Carmody (1982–1987)--6
- Curley Hallman (1988–1990)--3
- Jeff Bower (1990–2007)--18
- Larry Fedora (2008–2011)--4
- Ellis Johnson (2012)--1
- Todd Monken (2013–2015)--3
- Jay Hopson (2016–2020)--5
- Scotty Walden† (2020)--1
- Tim Billings† (2020)--1
- Will Hall (2020–2024)--5
- Reed Stringer † (2024)--1
- Charles Huff (2025-Present)--1

† Interim

== Bowl history ==
=== Major bowl games ===
Southern Miss has participated in 25 major bowl games, garnering a record of 12–13.

Season	Coach	Bowl	Opponent	Result
1953	Thad Vann	Sun Bowl	Pacific	L 7–26
1954	Thad Vann	Sun Bowl	Texas Western	L 14–37
1980	Bobby Collins	Independence Bowl	McNeese State	W 16–14
1981	Bobby Collins	Tangerine Bowl	Missouri	L 17–19
1988	Curley Hallman	Independence Bowl	UTEP	W 38–18
1990	Jeff Bower	All-American Bowl	NC State	L 27–31
1997	Jeff Bower	Liberty Bowl	Pittsburgh	W 41–7
1998	Jeff Bower	Humanitarian Bowl	Idaho	L 35–42
1999	Jeff Bower	Liberty Bowl	Colorado State	W 23–17
2000	Jeff Bower	Mobile Alabama Bowl	TCU	W 28–21
2002	Jeff Bower	Houston Bowl	Oklahoma State	L 23–33
2003	Jeff Bower	Liberty Bowl	Utah	L 0–17
2004	Jeff Bower	New Orleans Bowl	North Texas	W 31–10
2005	Jeff Bower	New Orleans Bowl	Arkansas State	W 31–19
2006	Jeff Bower	GMAC Bowl	Ohio	W 28–7
2007	Jeff Bower	PapaJohns.com Bowl	Cincinnati	L 21–31
2008	Larry Fedora	New Orleans Bowl	Troy	W 30–27 ^{OT}
2009	Larry Fedora	New Orleans Bowl	Middle Tennessee	L 32–42
2010	Larry Fedora	Beef 'O' Brady's Bowl	Louisville	L 28–31
2011	Larry Fedora	Hawaii Bowl	Nevada	W 24–17
2015	Todd Monken	Heart of Dallas Bowl	Washington	L 31–44
2016	Jay Hopson	New Orleans Bowl	Louisiana–Lafayette	W 28–21
2017	Jay Hopson	Independence Bowl	Florida State	L 13–42
2019	Jay Hopson	Armed Forces Bowl	Tulane	L 13–30
2022	Will Hall	LendingTree Bowl	Rice	W 38–24
2025	Blake Anderson (interim)	New Orleans Bowl	Western Kentucky	L 27-16

=== Minor bowl games ===
Southern Miss has participated in 2 minor bowl games, garnering a record of 0–2.

Season	Coach	Bowl	Opponent	Result
1956	Thad Vann	Tangerine Bowl	West Texas State	L 13–20
1957	Thad Vann	Tangerine Bowl	East Texas State	L 9–10

== Rivalries ==
=== Louisiana Tech ===
Known as the Rivalry in Dixie, Southern Miss and Louisiana Tech first played in 1935 and played each season from 1946 until 1972. Up until 2022, the two schools competed as conference foes in Conference USA's West Division until Southern Miss left Conference USA for the Sunbelt Conference. Tech and USM also were conference foes in the Southern Intercollegiate Athletic Association from 1935 to 1941. In addition, Tech and USM were both founding members of the Gulf States Conference which began play in 1948. The Bulldogs and Golden Eagles have played 11 times between 1975 and 1992. In 2008, Louisiana Tech AD-HC Derek Dooley and USM AD Richard Giannini signed a four-game contract to renew the rivalry with the first game being played in Ruston on September 25, 2010. The contract became unnecessary in 2012, when Louisiana Tech joined Southern Miss in Conference USA's West Division, which guarantees the schools will play each other every year until Southern Miss left for the Sun Belt Conference.

Southern Miss–Louisiana Tech: All-Time Record
Games played	First meeting	Last meeting	USM wins	USM losses	Win %
53	November 28, 1935 (lost 0–27)	November 19, 2021 (won 35–19)	36	17	67.9%

=== Memphis ===
Known as the Black and Blue Bowl, the long-standing rivalry between Southern Miss and Memphis dates back to October 26, 1935. This yearly classic garnered its name from the intense competitive nature of the contest, as well as the competing schools' colors: the black of Southern Miss and the blue of Memphis. From 1995 to 2012, both teams were members of Conference USA in the Eastern Division. The series has been dormant since Memphis accepted an invitation to join the American Athletic Conference.

Southern Miss–Memphis: All-Time Record
Games played	First meeting	Last meeting	USM wins	USM losses	Ties	Win %
63	October 26, 1935 (won 12–0)	November 24, 2012 (loss 24–42)	40	22	1	64.3%

=== Tulane ===
The Battle for the Bell is the name of the game between Southern Miss and Tulane. The two schools are located only about 110 miles from each other (Southern Miss in Hattiesburg, Mississippi, and Tulane in New Orleans, Louisiana) via Interstate 10 and Interstate 59, making for a heated game.

Beginning in 1979, The game was played annually until the reconfiguration of Conference USA in 2006. They are now in different conferences but both schools have scheduled non-conference games against each other. The most recent game, a 24–21 victory by the Green Wave, was played in New Orleans in 2026. Southern Miss holds a 24–11 lead in the series.

Southern Miss–Tulane: All-Time Record
Games played	First meeting	Last meeting	USM wins	USM losses	Win %
35	October 13, 1979 (lost 19–20)	September 26, 2026 (lost 21–24)	24	11	68.6%

== Venues ==
=== Renasant Stadium ===
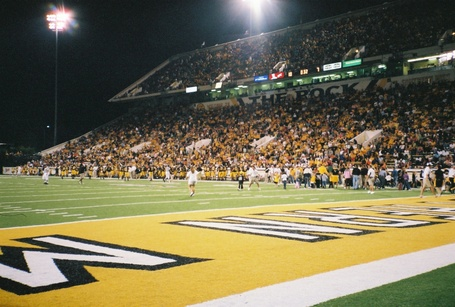
M. M. Roberts Stadium – "The Rock"

Carlisle-Faulkner Field at Renasant Stadium is nicknamed "The Rock at Southern Miss" and boasts a seating capacity of 36,000. The stadium history dates back to October 29, 1932, when the State Teachers College defeated Spring Hill College, 12–0, as some 4,000 fans looked on from wooden bleachers. On this homecoming date, the playing field was dedicated as "Faulkner Field" in honor of local businessman L. E. Faulkner, who provided the materials and equipment to build the original facility. The stadium was dedicated as M. M. Roberts Stadium on September 25, 1976, with Southern Miss hosting intrastate-rival University of Mississippi. Since the opening of M. M. Roberts Stadium in 1976, Southern Miss has accumulated a winning percentage of 73% at home. In 1989, the playing field had a new irrigation system installed. The Robert "Ace" Cleveland Press Box and president's box was renovated and chairback seating was added to the west side of the stadium. In 2002, the lighting system was upgraded to provide brighter lighting and two new poles were added, one in each end zone. The playing field at Roberts Stadium underwent a name change in the 2004 summer when it was renamed Carlisle-Faulkner Field at M.M. Roberts Stadium in honor of entrepreneur Gene Carlisle who provided the contribution for the installation of a new playing surface, Momentum Turf by Sportexe. A new state-of-the-art scoreboard was installed prior to the 2007 season. Other renovations and additions include such major projects as luxury suites, club-level seating, elevators on each side of the south end zone, and a visiting team locker room. In 2026, Renasant Bank acquired the naming rights to the stadium, renaming it "Resenant Stadium".

== Players ==
=== Golden Eagles to have played in the NFL, AFL or AAFC ===
- Tumbo Abanikanda
- Boston Adams
- Vincent Alexander
- Carl Allen
- Lyneal Alston
- Cornell Armstrong
- Hank Autry
- Ken Avery
- Brian Balazik
- Doug Barfield
- Jearld Baylis
- John Baylor
- Michael Boley
- Tommy Boutwell
- Jeff Bower
- Byron Bradfute
- Jeremy Bridges
- Fred Brock
- Greg Brooks
- Steve Broussard
- Bud Brown
- DeAndre Brown
- Kyle Burkhart
- Richard Byrd
- Damion Carter
- Perry Carter
- Antoine Cash
- Chris Clark
- Sidney Coleman
- Kevis Coley
- Reggie Collier
- Jamie Collins
- Fred Cook
- Austin Davis
- Rod Davis
- Mike Dennery
- Bo Dickinson
- Hanford Dixon
- Demar Dotson
- Tommy DuBose
- Robert Ducksworth
- Marcus Dupree
- John Eubanks
- Thomas Fairley
- Brett Favre
- Nollie Felts
- Patrick Ferrell
- Damion Fletcher
- Amos Fowler
- Don Fuell
- Ben Garry
- Jarvis Geyton
- Sherrod Gideon
- Reed Green
- Ray Guy
- Bobby Hamilton
- Terry Hardy
- DeMichael Harris
- Tory Harrison
- Marvin Harvey
- Harold Hays
- Robert Henderson
- George Herring
- Rashod Hill
- Lamar Holmes
- Derrick Hoskins
- Daniel Hrapmann
- Cooper Huckabee
- Don Hultz
- Michael Jackson
- Jason Jimenez
- Tom Johnson
- Tim Jones
- Ronald Jones
- Mike Katrishen
- Val Keckin
- Jeff Kelly
- William Kirksey
- Maxie Lambright
- Mike Landrum
- Cordarro Law
- Alonzo Lawrence
- Cliff Lewis
- Louis Lipps
- John Mangum
- Larry Mason
- Hugh McInnis
- Ryan McKee
- Gerald McRath
- Tarvarius Moore
- Tom Morrow
- Zeke Mottad
- Nick Mullens
- Shawn Nelson
- John Nix
- Tyrone Nix
- Rakeem Nuñez-Roches
- Don Owens
- Jeremy Parquet
- Laurin Pepper
- Perry Phenix
- Todd Pinkston
- Norris Piztoli
- Jeff Posey
- Norman Price
- Etric Pruitt
- Vic Purvis
- Stephen Reaves
- Kalan Reed
- Jalen Richard
- Tim Roberts
- Korey Robertson
- Tom Roussel
- Doug Satcher
- John Sawyer
- Cedric Scott
- DeQuincy Scott
- Vladmir Scott
- Harold Shaw
- Terrill Shaw
- T. J. Slaughter
- Kyle Sloter
- Ito Smith
- Tony Smith
- Daleroy Stewart
- Joe Stringfellow
- Brandon Sumrall
- Patrick Surtain
- Daryl Terrell
- Adalius Thomas
- Mike Thomas
- Norris Thomas
- Khyri Thornton
- Darryl Tillman
- Cameron Tom
- Torrin Tucker
- Art Van Tone
- Joe Vetrano (AAFC)
- Raymond Walls
- Tom Walters
- Quez Watkins
- Terry Wells
- Chris L. White
- Chad Williams
- Seante Williams
- Jerrel Wilson
- Sammy Winder

== Retired numbers ==
The Eagles have retired three numbers to date. Brett Favre and Ray Guy are the only players inducted in the Pro Football Hall of Fame.

Southern Miss Golden Eagles retired numbers
No.	Player	Pos.	Tenure	No. ret.	Ref.
4	Brett Favre	QB	1987–1990	2015	
10	Reggie Collier	QB	1980–1982	2008	
44	Ray Guy	P/S	1970–1972		

== Traditions ==
=== Southern Miss to the Top ===
The Southern Miss to the Top! Response Cheer is used among Southern Miss alumni, students and supporters. The initiator of the cheer says "Southern Miss!" The responder says "To the Top!" Hand signals accompany the cheer, which are two gestures upward with the index finger, done by both the initiator and responder.

=== The District ===
The District is located near the intersection of US Hwy 49 and Hardy Street. The historic district of campus is anchored by the five original buildings of the campus: Ogletree House (once the President's home, now housing the Southern Miss Alumni Association), The Honor House, College Hall, Forrest Hall, and Hattiesburg Hall. It is also the traditional tailgating site for students during football season. It is home to Lake Byron, which has served as a focal point for many university activities and several weddings.

=== Eagle Walk ===
The Eagle Walk is found underneath the upper deck of M. M. Roberts Stadium. Two hours prior to football game day, a cannon is fired, which begins the procession. ROTC, The Pride of Mississippi Marching Band, University officials, and football players make a march through this street to the cheers of thousands of fans. Every fall, the incoming freshmen give the walls and street a "fresh coat of paint" as they have done for half a century.

=== Seymour d'Campus ===
Over the years, Southern Miss has experienced an evolution of nicknames from Normalites to Tigers to Yellow Jackets to Confederates to Southerners. In 1972, alumni, faculty, students and staff were asked to submit new names for the athletic teams, and an ad hoc committee appointed by the Alumni Association voted on the submissions. The present mascot, the Golden Eagles, was chosen as the athletic teams’ name, and the new mascot was eventually named Seymour, an individual in a golden eagle costume. Seymour's full name is Seymour d'Campus (a pun on "see more [of] the campus"). The name was inspired by the 1984 World's Fair mascot, Seymour d'Fair (a pun on "see more [of] the Fair"), who was played by former Southern Miss mascot Jeff Davis ’83.

== Future non-conference opponents ==
Announced schedules as of October 13, 2026.

2027	2028	2029	2030	2031
at West Virginia	at Arizona State	at Mississippi State	at Middle Tennessee	
Tulane	Middle Tennessee	at UConn	Memphis	
at Memphis	at USF			
Southeastern Louisiana				
