= Curley Hallman =

American football player and coach (born 1947)

Biographical details
- Born: September 3, 1947 (age 79); Northport, Alabama, U.S.

Playing career
- 1966–1968: Texas A&M
- Position: Defensive back

Coaching career (HC unless noted)
- 1973–1976: Alabama (DB)
- 1979–1980: Clemson (LB)
- 1981: Clemson (DB)
- 1982–1987: Texas A&M (DB)
- 1988–1990: Southern Miss
- 1991–1994: LSU
- 1996–1997: Alabama (DB)
- 2001: Birmingham Thunderbolts (Co-DC)
- 2002–2003: Mississippi State (DB)
- 2004–2007: Muscle Shoals HS (AL)

Head coaching record
- Overall: 39–39 (college)
- Bowls: 1–0

Hudson "Curley" Hallman (born September 3, 1947) is an American former football player and coach. He served as the head coach at the University of Southern Mississippi (1988–1990) and Louisiana State University (1991–1994), compiling a career college football head coaching record of 39–39.

== Early years ==
Growing up near Tuscaloosa, Alabama, Hallman aspired to play for Alabama under head coach Bear Bryant. Alabama did not recruit him, although Gene Stallings at Texas A&M did. He played on the Aggies' 1967 squad, which garnered a Southwest Conference championship and a Cotton Bowl Classic win. In the bowl game, Hallman intercepted two passes by Alabama quarterback Ken Stabler. Hallman graduated from the school in 1970.

== Assistant coaching ==
As an assistant coach, Hallman served four seasons (1973–1976) under Bear Bryant at Alabama, two seasons under Richard Williamson at Memphis State in 1977-78 and six seasons (1982–1987) under Jackie Sherrill at his alma mater, coaching the defensive backs of the famed Wrecking Crew before being offered a head coaching position at Southern Miss. He had additionally coached linebackers (1979–1980) and defensive backs (1981) at Clemson University under Danny Ford.

== Southern Miss ==
In 1987, Hallman became the head coach at Southern Miss, where he proceeded to compile the highest winning percentage in school history with the help of future NFL star quarterback Brett Favre.

Hallman coached the Golden Eagles to a 23–11 record in three seasons. In his first year, he guided the team to a 1988 Independence Bowl victory over the UTEP Miners. Over the next two seasons, Southern Miss gained a reputation as "giant killers," thanks to victories over national powers such as Florida State and Alabama, all on the road. He is credited for laying the foundation for Southern Miss' rise to regional power status under Jeff Bower.

== LSU ==
On November 28, 1990, Hallman was hired to coach the LSU Tigers, replacing Mike Archer. He left for Baton Rouge just days before the Golden Eagles were due to play in the 1990 All-American Bowl. Jeff Bower, his offensive coordinator, coached the Golden Eagles in that game.

During Hallman's first season in 1991, several of Hallman's football players were accused of instigating a fight with LSU men's basketball players, including All-American Shaquille O'Neal, in Broussard Hall, LSU's athletic dormitory, two days prior to the Tigers' contest with Mississippi State. LSU started the 1991 season with one-sided losses to Georgia (31–10) and Hallman's alma mater, Texas A&M (45–7), and finished 5–6. The season marked the second time LSU suffered three consecutive losing seasons, and the first time since 1954 to 1956.

The 1992 season included being shut out 32–0 by Ole Miss on Halloween, and beaten 30–6 at Arkansas in the season finale, which was the first meeting between the Tigers and the Razorbacks upon Arkansas joining the SEC. The Tigers finished 2–9, still the worst in school history.

In 1993, LSU's centennial football season, the Tigers lost 58–3 to the Florida Gators in Tiger Stadium, the worst loss in school history. Amazingly, just four weeks after that, the Tigers stunned the Alabama Crimson Tide, 17–13, at Bryant–Denny Stadium in Tuscaloosa, ending the Tide's 31-game unbeaten streak. LSU entered the season finale at 5–5, with a chance at its first bowl bid since the end of the 1988 season. However, the Tigers gave up 412 yards rushing in a 42–24 loss to Arkansas at home.

The beginning of the end for Hallman came on September 17, 1994, at Jordan–Hare Stadium against Auburn. LSU led 23–9 early in the fourth quarter, and the Bayou Bengals were in good position to end Auburn's 13-game winning streak. But LSU quarterback Jamie Howard threw two interceptions that were returned for Auburn touchdowns, tying the game. LSU regained the lead with a field goal, but when the Bayou Bengals were trying to run out the clock, Howard threw his fourth interception of the game, and incredibly, Auburn returned the pick for another touchdown, giving the home team a 30–26 lead. LSU drove into Auburn territory in the game's final minute, but Howard threw his fifth and sixth interceptions on consecutive drives, sealing the win for Auburn. LSU never recovered, and ultimately finished 4-7.

On November 12, LSU lost to Southern Miss 20-18 in front of the smallest Death Valley crowd since 1974 (announced attendance was 51,718, but LSU officials estimated the actual crowd was closer to 40,000). Two days later, LSU athletic director Joe Dean gave Hallman an ultimatum–resign or be fired. When Hallman refused to resign, Dean fired him, though he was allowed to finish out the season. He closed out his career at LSU with a 30–12 win over Arkansas—the Tigers' first regular-season win in the series since 1956. His overall record was 16–28; his winning percentage of .364 is the worst for a non-interim coach in school history. To date, Hallman is the only LSU coach since the formation of the SEC to have never tallied a winning record or coached in a bowl game.

== After LSU ==
Hallman continued working at the college level as a position coach and coordinator for another decade, with stops at SEC schools Alabama and Mississippi State. In 2001, Hallman was the co-defensive coordinator for the Birmingham Thunderbolts in the XFL. From 2004 to 2007, he served as head coach at Muscle Shoals High School in Muscle Shoals, Alabama. His first season at Muscle Shoals resulted in a 3–7 record. At the conclusion of the 2007 regular season, the Muscle Shoals Trojans had compiled another dismal 4–6 record, their fourth straight losing season under Hallman. On January 14, 2008, the Muscle Shoals Board of Education accepted Hallman's resignation as head coach. He was replaced by Cordova High School's former head coach Scott Basden.

== Personal life ==
Hallman is married to former Alabama State Senator Tammy Irons of Florence.

== Head coaching record ==
=== College ===
Year	Team	Overall	Conference	Standing	Bowl/playoffs
Southern Miss Golden Eagles (NCAA Division I-A independent) (1988–1990)
1988	Southern Miss	10–2			W Independence
1989	Southern Miss	5–6			
1990	Southern Miss	8–3*			All-American*
Southern Miss:		23–13		*All-American Bowl coached by Jeff Bower	
LSU Tigers (Southeastern Conference) (1991–1994)
1991	LSU	5–6	3–4	T–6th	
1992	LSU	2–9	1–7	6th (Western)	
1993	LSU	5–6	3–5	T–4th (Western)	
1994	LSU	4–7	3–5	4th (Western)	
LSU:		16–28	10–21		
Total:		39–39			
