= 2007 PapaJohns.com Bowl =

- PapaJohns.com Bowl logo
Southern Miss Golden Eagles	Cincinnati Bearcats
(7–5)	(9–3)
C-USA	Big East
21	31
Head coach: Jeff Bower	Head coach: Brian Kelly
	AP / Coaches / BCS; 20 / 23 / 22
	1	2	3	4	Total
Southern Miss	7	0	7	7	21
Cincinnati	0	14	17	0	31
- Date: December 22, 2007
- Season: 2007
- Stadium: Legion Field
- Location: Birmingham, Alabama
- MVP: QB Ben Mauk, Cincinnati
- Favorite: Cincinnati by 11
- Referee: Cooper Castleberry (Big 12)
- Attendance: 35,258
- Payout: US$300,000 per team

United States TV coverage
- Network: ESPN2
- Announcers: Pam Ward, Ray Bentley, and Rob Simmelkjaer

The 2007 PapaJohns.com Bowl was a postseason college football match between the Southern Miss Golden Eagles and the Cincinnati Bearcats at Legion Field in Birmingham, Alabama. The University of Southern Mississippi represented Conference USA (which Cincinnati was once a member of) and the University of Cincinnati represented the Big East Conference. The game resulted in a 31–21 Cincinnati victory, which did not cover their 11-point spread. The payout for both teams was $300,000, the lowest payout among all college football bowl games.

This was the final game for head coach Jeff Bower, ending his 17-season tenure at Southern Miss. Bower was forced to resign after their disappointing season. After Bower's resignation, the selection of Southern Miss for this bowl game was notable as Bower's first game as head coach of the Golden Eagles was also at Legion Field, in the All-American Bowl in 1990.

Cincinnati quarterback Ben Mauk passed for four touchdowns and 334 yards. Southern Miss quarterback Jeremy Young went 18-for-32 for 122 yards with two touchdowns and three interceptions. After being down 31–14 in the fourth quarter, Jeremy Young cut the lead with a 5-yard touchdown pass to Chris Johnson, but Southern Miss's rally fell short after they couldn't recover an onside kick or convert a fourth-and-1 play on their next possession. Only 35,258 people attended the game, less than half of Legion Field's capacity. Cincinnati distributed 8,352 tickets, a school record for bowl attendance, while Southern Mississippi distributed around 5,000 tickets. Cincinnati's win brought their record to 10–3, their first 10-win season since 1951. With the loss, Southern Miss's record ended at 7–6.

== Game summary ==
Scoring summary

Quarter	Time	Drive			Team	Scoring information	Score	
Quarter	Time	Plays	Yards	TOP	Team	Scoring information	Southern Miss	Cincinnati
1	5:23		5 plays, 59 yards	1:55	Southern Miss	Shawn Nelson 10-yard touchdown reception from Jeremy Young, Justin Estes kick good	7	0
2	6:12		7 plays, 75 yards	2:19	Cincinnati	Dominick Goodman 14-yard touchdown reception from Ben Mauk, Jake Rogers kick good	7	7
2	0:24		6 plays, 49 yards	1:23	Cincinnati	Dominick Goodman 5-yard touchdown reception from Ben Mauk, Jake Rogers kick good	7	14
3	13:17		1 plays, 29 yards	0:09	Cincinnati	Earnest Jackson 29-yard touchdown reception from Ben Mauk, Jake Rogers kick good	7	21
3	6:48		14 plays, 80 yards	6:29	Southern Miss	Jeremy Young 1-yard touchdown run, Justin Estes kick good	14	21
3	4:08		8 plays, 58 yards	2:40	Cincinnati	Antwuan Giddens 10-yard touchdown reception from Ben Mauk, Jake Rogers kick good	14	28
3	0:05		9 plays, 51 yards	2:28	Cincinnati	22-yard field goal by Jake Rogers	14	31
4	9:37		11 plays, 76 yards	5:28	Southern Miss	Chris Johnson 5-yard touchdown reception from Jeremy Young, Justin Estes kick good	21	31
"TOP" = time of possession. For other American football terms, see Glossary of American football.							21	31

== Final statistics ==
Statistical comparison
	Eagles	Bearcats
1st downs	19	21
Total yards	339	405
Passing yards	122	334
Rushing yards	217	71
Penalties	8–80	8–51
3rd down conversions	6–17	6–14
4th down conversions	1–4	1–2
Turnovers	3	4
Time of Possession	33:36	26:24

Eagles Individual Leaders
Passing
Player	C/ATT^{*}	Yds	Pct	TD	INT
J. Young	18/32	122	56.3	2	3
Rushing
Player	Car^{a}	Yds	Ave	TD	LG^{b}
D. Fletcher	29	155	5.3	0	40
J. Young	17	55	3.2	1	20
T. Harrison	2	7	3.5	0	4
B. Barefoot	1	0	0.0	0	0
Receiving
Player	Rec^{c}	Yds	Ave	TD	LG^{b}
D. Fletcher	7	50	7.1	0	16
T. Harrison	1	18	18.0	0	18
S. Nelson	3	18	6.0	1	10
T. Magee	2	15	7.5	0	13
C. Johnson	2	13	6.5	1	8
E. Morgan	2	8	4.0	0	4
G. Baptiste	1	0	0.0	0	0

^{*} Completions/Attempts ^{a} Carries ^{b} Long play ^{c} Receptions

Bearcats Individual Leaders
Passing
Player	C/ATT^{*}	Yds	Pct	TD	INT
B. Mauk	30/52	334	57.7	4	3
Rushing
Player	Car^{a}	Yds	Ave	TD	LG^{b}
B. Mauk	12	41	3.4	0	14
G. Moore	4	18	4.5	0	12
J. Ramsey	6	9	1.5	0	6
B. Glatthaar	1	7	7.0	0	7
B. Benton	1	0	0.0	0	0
Receiving
Player	Rec^{c}	Yds	Ave	TD	LG^{b}
D. Goodman	7	95	13.6	2	20
C. Barwin	7	86	12.3	0	26
A. Giddens	7	64	9.1	1	23
E. Jackson	3	46	15.3	1	29
C. Howard	2	24	12.0	0	18
M. Barnett	2	17	8.5	0	10
G. Moore	1	3	3.0	0	3
B. Benton	1	(-)1	(-)1.0	0	0

^{*} Completions/Attempts ^{a} Carries ^{b} Long play ^{c} Receptions
