= 2003 Liberty Bowl =

2003 AXA Liberty Bowl
- 45th Liberty Bowl
Utah Utes	Southern Miss Golden Eagles
(9–2)	(9–3)
Mountain West	C-USA
17	0
Head coach: Urban Meyer	Head coach: Jeff Bower
AP / Coaches / BCS; 25 / 25 / 22
	1	2	3	4	Total
Utah	0	7	0	10	17
Southern Miss	0	0	0	0	0
- Date: December 31, 2003
- Season: 2003
- Stadium: Liberty Bowl Memorial Stadium
- Location: Memphis, Tennessee
- MVP: Morgan Scalley (DB, Utah)
- Referee: Gordon Riese (Pac-10)
- Attendance: 55,989

United States TV coverage
- Network: ESPN
- Announcers: Dave Barnett, Bill Curry

The 2003 Liberty Bowl was a college football postseason bowl game played on December 31, 2003, in Memphis, Tennessee. The 45th edition of the Liberty Bowl was a matchup between the Utah Utes and the Southern Miss Golden Eagles. The game was sponsored by the Axa Equitable Life Insurance Company and was branded as the AXA Liberty Bowl. Played in front of 55,989 fans, Utah shutout Southern Miss, 17–0.
