= Reed Green (American football) =

American baseball player (1911–2002)

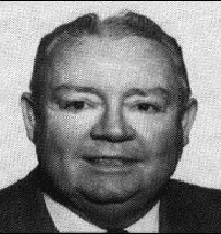
- Green circa 1970s

Biographical details
- Born: December 12, 1911; Leakesville, Mississippi, U.S.
- Died: February 1, 2002 (aged 90); Mobile, Alabama, U.S.

Playing career

Football
- 1930–1933: Mississippi State Teachers

Basketball
- 1930–1934: Mississippi State Teachers

Baseball
- 1934: Mississippi State Teachers

Coaching career (HC unless noted)

Football
- 1934: Mississippi State Teachers (freshmen)
- 1935–1936: Mississippi State Teachers (assistant)
- 1937–1948: Mississippi State Teachers / Mississippi Southern

Basketball
- 1934–1946: Mississippi State Teachers / Mississippi Southern

Baseball
- 1947: Mississippi Southern

Administrative career (AD unless noted)
- 1949–1973: Mississippi Southern / Southern Miss

Head coaching record
- Overall: 59–20–4 (football); 24–37 (basketball); 9–4 (baseball)
- Bowls: 2–0

Accomplishments and honors

Championships
- Football; 1 Gulf States (1948)

Bernard Reed Green (December 12, 1911 – February 1, 2002) was an American football, basketball, and baseball player, coach, and college athletics administrator. He served as the head football coach at the University of Southern Mississippi from 1937 to 1948, compiling a record of 59–20–4. Green's winning percentage of .735 is the best of any head coach in the history of the Southern Miss Golden Eagles football program. Born in Leakesville, Mississippi, he attended the University of Southern Mississippi from 1930 until 1933 and lettered on the football, basketball, and baseball teams. He became the head coach of Southern Miss when Allison Pooley Hubert left to become the head coach at Virginia Military Institute. Green became the athletic director at Southern Miss in 1949 and held that position until 1973. He was inducted into the Mississippi Sports Hall of Fame in 1966. Green died in 2002.

Reed Green Coliseum, home of the Southern Miss Golden Eagles basketball and volleyball teams, is named for him.

== Head coaching record ==
=== Football ===
| Year | Team | Overall | Conference | Standing | Bowl/playoffs |
|---|---|---|---|---|---|
Mississippi State Teachers Yellow Jackets / Mississippi Southern Southerners (Southern Intercollegiate Athletic Association) (1937–1941)
| 1937 | Mississippi State Teachers | 7–3 | 4–2 | T–10th | W Doll and Toy Charity Game |
| 1938 | Mississippi State Teachers | 7–2 | 6–1 | | |
| 1939 | Mississippi State Teachers | 4–2–3 | 4–1 | | |
| 1940 | Mississippi Southern | 7–4 | 3–2 | | |
| 1941 | Mississippi Southern | 9–0–1 | 4–0–1 | | |
Mississippi Southern Southerners (Independent) (1942–1947)
| 1942 | Mississippi Southern | 4–0 | | | |
| 1943 | No team—World War II | | | | |
| 1944 | No team—World War II | | | | |
| 1945 | No team—World War II | | | | |
| 1946 | Mississippi Southern | 7–3 | | | W Bacardi |
| 1947 | Mississippi Southern | 7–3 | | | |
Mississippi Southern Southerners (Gulf States Conference) (1948)
| 1948 | Mississippi Southern | 7–3 | 4–0 | 1st | |
| Mississippi Southern: | | 59–20–4 | 25–4–1 | | |
| Total: | | 59–20–4 | | | |
National championship Conference title Conference division title or championship game berth
