= Jim Carmody =

American football player and coach (1933–2023)

Biographical details
- Born: August 24, 1933; Shreveport, Louisiana, U.S.
- Died: January 5, 2023 (aged 89); Madison, Mississippi, U.S.
- Education: Copiah-Lincoln Community College, Tulane University

Playing career
- 1954–1955: Tulane

Coaching career (HC unless noted)
- 1964–1966: Mississippi State (assistant)
- 1967–1973: North Carolina (assistant)
- 1974–1977: Ole Miss (assistant)
- 1978–1980: Southern Miss (DC)
- 1981: Buffalo Bills (assistant)
- 1982–1987: Southern Miss
- 1989–1990: Mississippi State (DC/DL)
- 1992–1994: Ole Miss (AHC/DL)

Head coaching record
- Overall: 37–29

James Edward Carmody Jr. (August 24, 1933 – January 5, 2023) was an American football player and coach. He served as the head football coach at the University of Southern Mississippi from 1982 to 1987, compiling a career record of 37–29. Carmody's 1982 Golden Eagles team went into Bryant–Denny Stadium defeated Bear Bryant's Alabama team that had won 56 consecutive home games entering the contest. Carmody also served as an assistant coach at Mississippi State University, the University of Mississippi and the University of North Carolina.

== Early life ==
Carmody was born on August 24, 1933, in Shreveport, Louisiana. In high school, he received three letters in football and baseball from Holy Cross High School in New Orleans, Louisiana, from 1948 to 1952. He attended college at Copiah-Lincoln Junior College from 1952 to 1954 and Tulane University from 1954 to 1955. While at Tulane, Carmody was a two-year football letterman who played in the first night game at Tulane Stadium in 1954.

== Assistant coach ==
Carmody served as an assistant coach at Mississippi State from 1964 to 1966 under head coaches Paul E. Davis and Charles Shira. After leaving MSU, Carmody joined Bill Dooley's staff at North Carolina and served as an assistant coach for seven seasons (1967–1973). He then served on Ken Cooper's staff at Ole Miss from 1974 to 1977, Bobby Collins' staff at Southern Miss as defensive coordinator from 1978 to 1980 (where he earned the nickname "The Big Nasty" as coordinator of the "Nasty Bunch") and made a stop in the National Football League with the Buffalo Bills as an assistant coach in 1981.

== Southern Miss ==
Carmody was hired to replace Bobby Collins as the Golden Eagles head football coach in 1982 after Collins took the head coaching position at SMU. Under Carmody's tutelage, the Golden Eagles compiled a record of 37–29 with no bowl appearances.

During Carmody's tenure, the Golden Eagles defeated Alabama, 38–29, in Tuscaloosa in 1982, snapping the Crimson Tide's 56-game home winning streak at Bryant–Denny Stadium. It was the first time since 1962 that Alabama had lost there, and 1982 proved to be the final season of coach Bear Bryant's career. Carmody recruited a Kiln, Mississippi, high school quarterback named Brett Favre to Southern Miss in 1987.

In 1984, Southern Miss, already under NCAA sanctions for prior infractions, admitted to improper recruiting practices pertaining to freshman linebacker Don Palmer. As part of the fallout, Carmody's salary was frozen. Palmer alleged he was given clothing, basketball game tickets, cash, and transportation to the campus by an USM assistant coach.

== Later coaching career ==
After leaving Southern Miss, Carmody returned to Mississippi State to serve as defensive coordinator under head coach Rockey Felker, a position he held during the 1989 and 1990 seasons. Under his watch, the Bulldogs defense improved from 89th nationally before he arrived to 15th. He then returned to Ole Miss to serve as associate head coach and defensive line coach under head coaches Billy Brewer and Joe Lee Dunn, where the Rebels defenses ranked #6 nationally in 1992, #1 nationally in 1993 and #17 nationally in 1994. New head coach Tommy Tuberville did not retain Carmody on his staff in 1995.

== Head coaching record ==
=== College ===
Year	Team	Overall	Conference	Standing	Bowl/playoffs
Southern Miss Golden Eagles (NCAA Division I-A Independent) (1982–1987)
1982	Southern Miss	7–4			
1983	Southern Miss	7–4			
1984	Southern Miss	4–7			
1985	Southern Miss	7–4			
1986	Southern Miss	6–5			
1987	Southern Miss	6–5			
Southern Miss:		37–29			
Total:		37–29			
