= P. W. Underwood =

American football player and coach (1931–2013)

Biographical details
- Born: October 16, 1931; Cordova, Alabama, U.S.
- Died: February 4, 2013 (aged 81); Hattiesburg, Mississippi, U.S.

Playing career
- 1954–1956: Southern Miss
- 1957–1958: Hamilton Tiger-Cats

Coaching career (HC unless noted)
- 1963–1966: Southern Miss (line)
- 1967–1968: Tennessee (LB)
- 1969–1974: Southern Miss
- 1976–1980: Auburn (DC)

Head coaching record
- Overall: 31–32–2

Phillip Wayne "Bear" Underwood (October 16, 1931 – February 4, 2013), known as P. W. Underwood, was an American gridiron football player and coach. He was the head coach of the Southern Miss Golden Eagles from 1969 to 1974.

A native of Cordova, Alabama, Underwood joined the United States Army upon graduating from high school, serving several years with the military police. He began his playing career at Southern Miss in 1954, and played three seasons for the Golden Eagles. He then had a brief professional career with the Hamilton Tiger-Cats of the Canadian Football League (CFL), before turning to coaching.

After a short stint as an assistant for the Tennessee Volunteers he returned to become head coach at Southern Miss in 1969. During his six seasons he posted a 31–32–2 record and engineered one of the biggest wins in school history, a 30–14 win over fourth ranked Ole Miss in 1970.

Underwood was selected by the Chicago Bears in the 28th round, 330th overall, in the 1954 NFL draft, even before playing at Southern Miss.

He died on February 4, 2013.

== Head coaching record ==
Year	Team	Overall	Conference	Standing	Bowl/playoffs
Southern Miss Southerners/Golden Eagles (NCAA University Division / Division I independent]]) (1969–1974)
1969	Southern Miss	5–5			
1970	Southern Miss	5–6			
1971	Southern Miss	6–5			
1972	Southern Miss	3–7–1			
1973	Southern Miss	6–4–1			
1974	Southern Miss	6–5			
Southern Miss:		31–32–2			
Total:		31–32–2			
