= A. B. Dille =

American football/basketball player and coach (1892–1964)

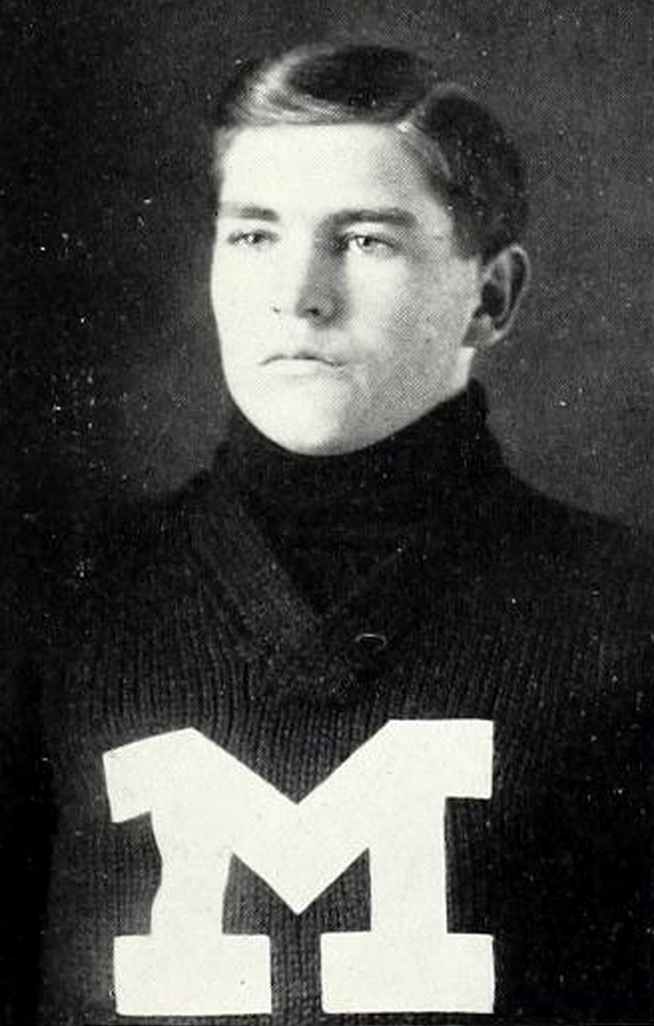
- Dille pictured in Reveille 1911, Mississippi State yearbook

Biographical details
- Born: October 31, 1892
- Died: August 21, 1964 (aged 71)

Playing career

Football
- 1910: Mississippi A&M
- Position: Halfback

Coaching career (HC unless noted)

Football
- 1914–1916: Mississippi Normal

Basketball
- 1913–1916: Mississippi Normal

Head coaching record
- Overall: 6–10–1 (football); 29–14 (basketball)

Avery Benjamin Dille (October 31, 1892 – August 21, 1964) was an American college football and college basketball player and coach and educator. He served as the head football coach at Mississippi Normal College—now known as the University of Southern Mississippi—from 1914 to 1916, compiling a record of 6–10–1. Dille was also the head basketball coach at Mississippi Normal from 1913 to 1916, tallying a mark of 29–14.

== Education and playing career ==
Dille played halfback for the Mississippi A&M (now Mississippi State University) football team and was awarded a letter for the 1910 season.

== Coaching career ==
=== Football ===
Dille was the coach head football at Mississippi Normal College—now known as the University of Southern Mississippi. He held the position from 1914 until conclusion of the 1916 season and was the third person to hold the position at the school. His record at Mississippi Normal was 6–10–1.

A unique positive turning point occurred in the 1916 season as the result of a loss. In what was called the program's "Greatest pre-World War I success", the team lost to Ole Miss by a score of 13 to 7. The school's leadership at the time took this as a sign that the program could compete nationally in the sport of football.

Due to World War I, the school ceased competing in football after completion of the 1916 season and did not restart the program until 1919.

=== Basketball ===
While at Mississippi Normal, Dille also served as the head basketball coach from 1913 until the conclusion of the 1915–16 season, during which time his teams produced a record of 29–14 (.674). Dille was the second person to hold the position at the school.

== Teaching career ==
In 1917, Dille was hired as the principal and agriculturalist at the newly-formed Tallachatchie County Agricultural High School in Charleston, Mississippi.

== Head coaching record ==
Year	Team	Overall	Conference	Standing	Bowl/playoffs
Mississippi Normal Normalites (Independent) (1914–1916)
1914	Mississippi Normal	2–3–1			
1915	Mississippi Normal	4–4			
1916	Mississippi Normal	0–3			
Mississippi Normal:		6–10–1			
Total:		6–10–1			
