= Pride of Mississippi Marching Band =

Marching band of the University of Southern Mississippi

The Pride of Mississippi Marching Band is the marching band of the University of Southern Mississippi. The band performs at all football games featuring the Southern Miss Golden Eagles football team.

== History ==
The band was founded in 1920 by director Audie F. Fugitt. Originally a 20-piece brass ensemble (with an instrumentation of 1 Clarinet, 1 Alto Saxophone, 7 Cornets (including Fugitt), 2 Mellophones, 1 Tenor Horn, 3 Trombones, 1 Baritone Horn, 1 Sousaphone, 2 Snare Drums, and 1 Bass Drum in 1923), the current band numbers about 300.

The band performed at Franklin D. Roosevelt's inaugural parade in the 1930s, various gubernatorial inaugurations, the Senior Bowl Classics and professional and collegiate bowl games. The Pride has toured throughout the United States and to England and Ireland.

In 1977, when Jimmy Carter was sworn in as 39th President of the United States in Washington, D.C., members of the Southern Miss Pride of Mississippi Marching Band were invited by him to be present; twenty-five members from each college band in Mississippi were selected by their college directors to make up an All-Star Band to represent Mississippi in the inaugural parade in Washington. The band rehearsed in Jackson, Mississippi prior to flying to Washington on the "Peanut Special" (plane that brought the Carter Family to Washington, where they participated in the event).

Although mainly made up of music majors enrolled in the University of Southern Mississippi School of Music, the Pride of Mississippi is open to all students enrolled at the University of Southern Mississippi. Scholarships are offered to both music majors as well as non-majors.

The Pride of Mississippi was referred to in the 1980s as the most televised band in the land for being televised on national television numerous times as well as supposedly being placed in the Guinness Book of World Record for this feat.

In 2009, The Pride was selected to march in the 2010 Macy's Thanksgiving Day Parade, making it the first university marching band in Mississippi to be selected for this honor.

In March 2015, The Pride of Mississippi traveled to Ireland to compete in the Limerick International Band Championships and in the Dublin St Patrick's Day Parade/Festival. The Pride won the Limerick competition as the "Best Band Overall". In the Dublin parade, The Pride won the "Best Adult Marching Band" title.
