= 1990 All-American Bowl =

| Southern Miss Golden Eagles | NC State Wolfpack |
| (8–3) | (6–5) |
| 27 | 31 |
| Head coach: Jeff Bower | Head coach: Dick Sheridan |
| AP / Coaches; 23 / 24 |
| | 1 | 2 | 3 | 4 | Total |
|---|---|---|---|---|---|
| Southern Miss | 6 | 8 | 7 | 6 | 27 |
| NC State | 14 | 3 | 7 | 7 | 31 |
- Date: December 28, 1990
- Season: 1990
- Stadium: Legion Field
- Location: Birmingham, Alabama
- MVP: QB Brett Favre, Southern Miss
- Referee: Gordon Riese (Pac-10)
- Attendance: 44,000

United States TV coverage
- Network: ESPN
- Announcers: Ron Franklin, Gary Danielson, and Jerry Punch

The 1990 All-American Bowl was an American college football bowl game that was played on December 28, 1990 at Legion Field in Birmingham, Alabama. The game matched the Southern Miss Golden Eagles against the NC State Wolfpack. It was the final contest of the 1990 NCAA Division I-A football season for both teams. The game ended in a 31–27 victory for the Wolfpack. The game represented the final game of Southern Miss quarterback Brett Favre's collegiate career. He was named the game's MVP despite his team's loss, compiling 341 passing yards in 39 attempts with one interception. The game was the fourteenth and final edition of the All-American Bowl (previously known as the Hall of Fame Classic).

== Teams ==
The game matched the Southern Miss Golden Eagles against the NC State Wolfpack of the Atlantic Coast Conference. The game was the first bowl game featuring the Golden Eagles and the Wolfpack, and was their eighth overall meeting. Southern Miss led the series 4–3 heading into the game, and the teams' previous meeting was in 1966, when the Golden Eagles defeated the Wolfpack 7–6.

=== Southern Miss Golden Eagles ===
The conference-independent Golden Eagles entered the game ranked 23 in the AP Poll. Their regular-season record was 8–3. The game represented the Golden Eagles' first appearance in the All-American Bowl.

=== NC State Wolfpack ===
The unranked NC State Wolfpack of the ACC compiled a 6–5 record before the game, including a 3–4 record against conference opponents. The game represented the Wolfpack's first appearance in the All-American Bowl.

== Game summary ==
=== Scoring summary ===
Scoring summary

| Quarter | Time | Drive | | | Team | Scoring information | Score | |
| Quarter | Time | Plays | Yards | TOP | Team | Scoring information | USM | NCSU |
|---|---|---|---|---|---|---|---|---|
| 1 | | | | | USM | Mark Montgomery 10-yard touchdown reception from Brett Favre, kick no good | 6 | 0 |
| 1 | | | | | NCSU | Terry Jordan 10-yard touchdown run, Mark Fowble kick good | 6 | 7 |
| 1 | | | | | NCSU | Gary Downs 2-yard touchdown run, Fowble kick good | 6 | 14 |
| 2 | | | | | USM | Montgomery 13-yard touchdown reception from Favre, 2-point pass good | 14 | 14 |
| 2 | | | | | NCSU | 22-yard field goal by Fowble | 14 | 17 |
| 3 | | | | | USM | Tony Smith 1-yard touchdown run, Taylor kick good | 21 | 17 |
| 3 | | | | | NCSU | Bobby Jurgens 12-yard touchdown reception from Jordan, Fowble kick good | 21 | 24 |
| 4 | | | | | NCSU | Greg Manior 41-yard touchdown run, Fowble kick good | 21 | 31 |
| 4 | | | | | USM | Michael Welch 5-yard touchdown run, 2-point pass failed | 27 | 31 |
| "TOP" = time of possession. For other American football terms, see Glossary of American football. | | | | | | | 27 | 31 |

=== Statistics ===
| Statistics | USM | NCSU |
|---|---|---|
| First downs | 19 | 23 |
| Plays–yards | 63–385 | 74–357 |
| Rushes–yards | 24–44 | 49–193 |
| Passing yards | 341 | 166 |
| Passing: Comp–Att–Int | 28–39–1 | 15–25–1 |
| Time of possession | 27:24 | 32:36 |
