= Jeff Bower (American football) =

American football player and coach (born 1953)

Biographical details
- Born: May 28, 1953 (age 73); Roswell, Georgia, U.S.

Playing career
- 1971: Georgia
- 1972–1975: Southern Miss
- Position: Quarterback

Coaching career (HC unless noted)
- 1975–1977: Southern Miss (GA)
- 1978–1981: Southern Miss (WR/QB)
- 1982–1986: SMU (QB)
- 1987: Wake Forest (QB)
- 1988–1989: Southern Miss (AHC/OC/QB)
- 1990: Oklahoma State (OC/QB)
- 1990–2007: Southern Miss

Head coaching record
- Overall: 119–83–1
- Bowls: 6–5

Accomplishments and honors

Championships
- 4 C-USA (1996, 1997, 1999, 2003); 1 C-USA East Division (2006)

Awards
- 1990s C-USA Coach of the Decade; 3× C-USA Coach of the Year (1997, 1999, 2003)

Jeffrey Jon Bower (born May 28, 1953) is an American former college football player and coach. He served as the head football coach at University of Southern Mississippi for 18 seasons, from 1990 to 2007, compiling a record of 119–83–1. Bower assumed the role of head coach at Southern Miss on December 2, 1990, and announced his retirement on November 26, 2007, effective after the 2007 PapaJohns.com Bowl, which was played on December 22. The Golden Eagles had a winning record in Bowers' final 14 seasons and played in a bowl game in 10 of his last 11 seasons.

== Early life and playing career ==
Bower grew up in Roswell, Georgia, where he attended Roswell High School. He led the football team to two state championships and became a prep All-American, one of the school's first. He also started for two state champion baseball teams and one state champion basketball squad. He was named Class A Player of the year and played in the state All-Star game.

Bower started his college football career at the University of Georgia before transferring to Southern Miss. He started as quarterback in 1973. His career records from 1973 to 1975 are still in the top five for many of the school's passing statistics, including third all-time in passing percentage.

== Coaching career ==
Bower spent 29 years at the University of Southern Mississippi as a quarterback, assistant coach and head coach. He was named "Coach of the Decade" by Conference USA in 2004.

== Head coaching record ==
Year	Team	Overall	Conference	Standing	Bowl/playoffs	Coaches^{#}	AP^{°}
Southern Miss Golden Eagles (NCAA Division I-A independent) (1990–1995)
1990	Southern Miss	0–1			L All-American		
1991	Southern Miss	4–7					
1992	Southern Miss	7–4					
1993	Southern Miss	3–7–1					
1994	Southern Miss	6–5					
1995	Southern Miss	6–5					
Southern Miss Golden Eagles (Conference USA) (1996–2007)
1996	Southern Miss	8–3	4–1	T–1st			
1997	Southern Miss	9–3	6–0	1st	W Liberty	19	19
1998	Southern Miss	7–5	5–1	2nd	L Humanitarian		
1999	Southern Miss	9–3	6–0	1st	W Liberty	13	14
2000	Southern Miss	8–4	4–3	3rd	W Mobile Alabama		
2001	Southern Miss	6–5	4–3	4th			
2002	Southern Miss	7–6	5–4	4th	L Houston		
2003	Southern Miss	9–4	8–0	1st	L Liberty		
2004	Southern Miss	7–5	5–3	3rd	W New Orleans		
2005	Southern Miss	7–5	5–3	3rd (East)	W New Orleans		
2006	Southern Miss	9–5	6–3	1st (East)	W GMAC		
2007	Southern Miss	7–6	5–3	4th (East)	L PapaJohns.com		
Southern Miss:		119–83–1	63–24				
Total:		119–83–1					
National championship Conference title Conference division title or championship game berth
^{#}Rankings from final Coaches Poll.; ^{°}Rankings from final AP Poll.
