= Elijah McGuire =

American football player (born 1994)

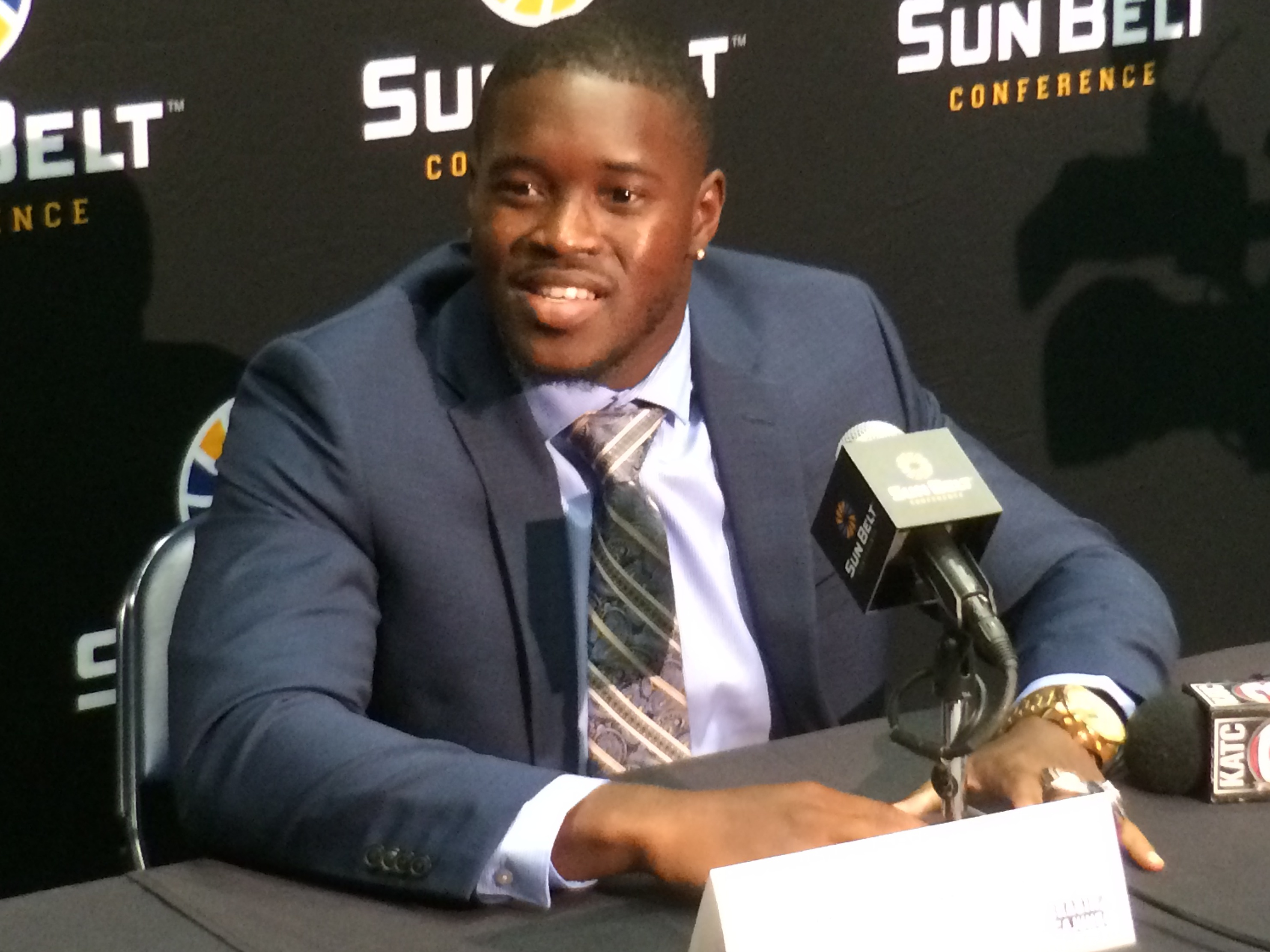
- McGuire at 2016 Sun Belt Media Day

No. 25
- Position: Running back

Personal information
- Born: June 1, 1994 (age 32); Houma, Louisiana, U.S.
- Listed height: 5 ft 10 in (1.78 m)
- Listed weight: 214 lb (97 kg)

Career information
- High school: Vandebilt Catholic (Houma)
- College: UL Lafayette (2013–2016)
- NFL draft: 2017: 6th round, 188th overall pick

Career history
- New York Jets (2017–2018); Cleveland Browns (2019); Kansas City Chiefs (2019–2020)*; Dallas Cowboys (2020)*; Miami Dolphins (2020); Kansas City Chiefs (2020–2021)*
- * Offseason or practice squad member only

Awards and highlights
- Super Bowl champion (LIV); Sun Belt Player of the Year (2014); Sun Belt Offensive Player of the Year (2014); Sun Belt Freshman of the Year (2013); 2× First-team All-Sun Belt (2013, 2014); 2× Second-team All-Sun Belt (2015, 2016)

Career NFL statistics
- Rushing yards: 591
- Rushing average: 3.3
- Rushing touchdowns: 4
- Receptions: 36
- Receiving yards: 370
- Receiving touchdowns: 2
- Stats at Pro Football Reference

Elijah Lamont McGuire Jr. (born June 1, 1994) is an American former professional football player who was a running back in the National Football League (NFL). He played college football for the Louisiana Ragin' Cajuns.

== Early life ==
McGuire attended and played high school football for Vandebilt Catholic High School. He was selected to the all-state first-team as an athlete by The Louisiana Sports Writers Association as a senior. He led the state of Louisiana with 2,603 rushing yards, 11.8 rushing average and 31 touchdowns while Vandebilt Catholic High School finished with an 11–2 record. He also was selected to the first-team all-region honorable mention.

== College career ==
McGuire attended and played college football for the Louisiana Ragin' Cajuns from 2013–2016. McGuire also played basketball for Louisiana for one year, the 2015–16 season.

=== 2013 season ===
As a freshman, McGuire played in 13 games. He made his collegiate debut in a loss at Arkansas, where he had 12 rushing yards and a 31-yard reception in the 34–14 loss. On September 14, against Nicholls State, he had 137 rushing yards and three rushing touchdowns in the 70–7 victory. On November 16, against Georgia State, he had a great performance with 107 rushing yards to go along with three receptions for 125 yards and two receiving touchdowns in the 35–21 victory. Overall, he finished the 2013 season with 863 rushing yards, eight rushing touchdowns, 22 receptions, 384 receiving yards, and three receiving touchdowns.

=== 2014 season ===
As a sophomore, McGuire played in 13 games. He started the season off strong with 129 rushing yards and a touchdown against Southern in the 45–6 victory. On September 20, he had 10 receptions for 106 receiving yards to along with 31 yards against Boise State in the 34–9 victory. On October 21, against Arkansas State, he had 265 rushing yards and four rushing touchdowns in the 55–40 victory. On November 1, against South Alabama, he had 116 rushing yards, one rushing touchdown, and 90 receiving yards in the 19–9 victory. The next week, against New Mexico State, he had 136 rushing yards and a rushing touchdown to go along with a four-yard touchdown reception in the 44–16 victory. In the regular season finale against Troy, he had 169 rushing yards and two rushing touchdowns in the 42–23 victory. Overall, he finished the 2014 season with 1,264 rushing yards, 14 rushing touchdowns, 45 receptions, 468 receiving yards, and two receiving touchdowns.

=== 2015 season ===
As a junior, McGuire played in 12 games. In the second game of the season against Northwestern State, he had 14 carries for 165 yards and five rushing touchdowns in the 44–17 victory. On October 10, against Texas State, he had 170 rushing yards and a rushing touchdown in the 49–27 victory. In the next game, at Arkansas State, he had a great receiving day with 10 receptions for 134 yards and a touchdown in the loss in the 37–27 loss. On November 21, against New Mexico State, he had 159 rushing yards and two rushing touchdowns in the 37–34 loss. Overall, in the 2015 season, he finished with 1,047 rushing yards, 13 rushing touchdowns, 34 receptions, 304 receiving yards, and three receiving touchdowns.

=== 2016 season ===
As a senior, McGuire played in 13 games. In the second game, against McNeese State, he had 139 rushing yards in the 30–22 victory. In the next game against South Alabama, he had 223 rushing yards and a rushing touchdown in the 28–23 victory. On October 22, against Texas State, he had 112 rushing yards and two rushing touchdowns in the 27–3 victory. On November 19, against the Georgia Bulldogs, he had 129 rushing yards in the 35–21 loss at Sanford Stadium. In his final collegiate game, he had 99 rushing yards in the 28–21 loss to Southern Miss in the 2016 New Orleans Bowl. Overall, he finished the 2016 season with 1,127 rushing yards, seven rushing touchdowns, 29 receptions, 238 receiving yards, and two receiving touchdowns.

=== College statistics ===
Football

Year	School	Class	Pos	G	Rushing				Receiving			
Year	School	Class	Pos	G	Rush	Yds	Avg	TD	Rec	Yds	Avg	TD
2013	Louisiana	FR	RB	13	103	863	8.4	8	22	384	17.5	3
2014	Louisiana	SO	RB	13	166	1,264	7.6	14	45	468	10.4	2
2015	Louisiana	JR	RB	12	209	1,047	5.0	13	34	304	8.9	3
2016	Louisiana	SR	RB	13	232	1,127	4.9	7	29	238	8.2	2
Career				51	710	4,301	6.1	42	130	1,394	10.7	10

Basketball

Year	Team	GP	GS	MPG	FG%	3P%	FT%	RPG	APG	SPG	BPG	PPG
2015–16	Louisiana	16	0	3.7	.286	.143	.200	.812	0.2	.125	0	.625

== Professional career ==
Pre-draft measurables
Height	Weight	Arm length	Hand span	40-yard dash	20-yard shuttle	Three-cone drill	Vertical jump	Broad jump	Bench press
5 ft 9 3/4 in (1.77 m)	214 lb (97 kg)	31 in (0.79 m)	9 in (0.23 m)	4.53 s	4.56 s	7.26 s	36.0 in (0.91 m)	10 ft 0 in (3.05 m)	15 reps
All values from NFL Combine

=== New York Jets ===
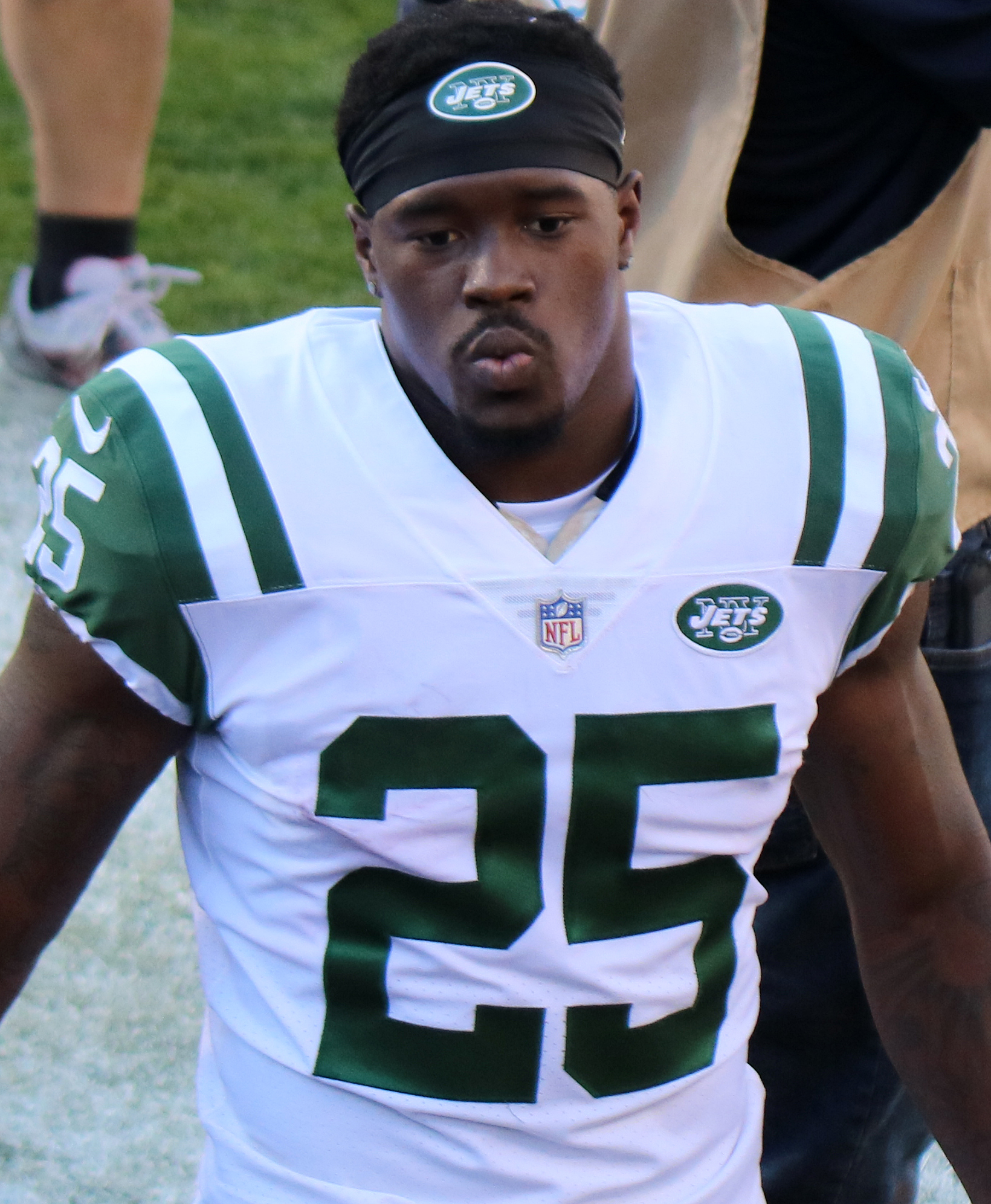
McGuire with the Jets in 2017

McGuire was selected in the sixth round with the 188th overall pick by the New York Jets in the 2017 NFL draft. He was the 20th running back selected in that year's draft.

In Week 2, in the 45–20 loss to the Oakland Raiders, McGuire had six rushes for 29 yards for his debut in the Jets backfield. On October 1, 2017, during Week 4 against the Jacksonville Jaguars, McGuire rushed for 93 yards, including one for a 69-yard touchdown, as the Jets won 23–20 in overtime. Overall, he finished his rookie season with 315 rushing yards, one rushing touchdown, 17 receptions, 177 receiving yards, and one receiving touchdown.

On September 3, 2018, McGuire was placed on injured reserve with a foot injury. He was activated off injured reserve on November 2, 2018. In the 2018 season, he finished with 276 rushing yards and three rushing touchdowns. In addition, he had 19 receptions for 193 receiving yard and one receiving touchdown.

McGuire was released on August 30, 2019, as part of the final roster cuts.

=== Cleveland Browns ===
On September 2, 2019, McGuire was signed to the practice squad of the Cleveland Browns. He was signed to the active roster on September 16, 2019. He was waived by the Browns on September 19, 2019, and re-signed to the practice squad on September 21, 2019. The Browns released McGuire from their practice squad on October 22, 2019.

=== Kansas City Chiefs (first stint) ===
On November 25, 2019, McGuire was signed to the Kansas City Chiefs practice squad. McGuire won Super Bowl LIV with the Chiefs after they defeated the San Francisco 49ers 31–20. He re-signed with the Chiefs on February 5, 2020. He was waived on September 5, 2020.

=== Dallas Cowboys ===
After being released from the Chiefs, the Dallas Cowboys signed McGuire to their practice squad on September 9, 2020. He was released on October 27.

=== Miami Dolphins ===
On December 9, 2020, McGuire was signed to the Miami Dolphins' practice squad. He was elevated to the active roster on December 12 for the team's Week 14 game against the Kansas City Chiefs, and reverted to the practice squad after the game. He was released on December 14, 2020.

=== Kansas City Chiefs (second stint) ===
On December 22, 2020, McGuire signed with the practice squad of the Kansas City Chiefs. His practice squad contract with the team expired after the season on February 16, 2021.

McGuire re-signed with the Chiefs on March 31, 2021. He was placed on injured reserve on August 17, 2021. He was released on August 26 after reaching an injury settlement with the Chiefs. He was re-signed to the practice squad on October 12. He was released on January 19, 2022.

== Personal life ==
McGuire earned his college degree in General Studies in December 2016.
