= 2016 New Orleans Bowl =

2016 R+L Carriers New Orleans Bowl
- 16th New Orleans Bowl
Southern Miss Golden Eagles	Louisiana–Lafayette Ragin' Cajuns
(6–6)	(6–6)
C-USA	Sun Belt
28	21
Head coach: Jay Hopson	Head coach: Mark Hudspeth
	1	2	3	4	Total
Southern Miss	14	0	7	7	28
Louisiana–Lafayette	7	7	0	7	21
- Date: December 17, 2016
- Season: 2016
- Stadium: Mercedes-Benz Superdome
- Location: New Orleans, Louisiana
- MVP: Southern Miss WR Allenzae Staggers
- Favorite: Southern Mississippi by 3.5
- Referee: Tom Stapleton (MAC)
- Attendance: 35,061
- Payout: US$500,000

United States TV coverage
- Network: ESPN; ESPN Radio
- Announcers: Jason Benetti, Rod Gilmore, Quint Kessenich (ESPN); Bill Rosinski, David Norrie, Ian Fitzsimmons (ESPN Radio)

The 2016 New Orleans Bowl was a post-season American college football bowl game played on December 17, 2016, at Mercedes-Benz Superdome in New Orleans, Louisiana. The 16th annual edition of the New Orleans Bowl was one of the 2016–17 bowl games that conclude the 2016 FBS football season. Sponsored by freight shipping company R+L Carriers, the game was officially known as the R+L Carriers New Orleans Bowl. Southern Miss won the game by a score of 28–21.

== Team selection ==
The game featured the Southern Miss Golden Eagles against the Louisiana–Lafayette Ragin' Cajuns.

This was the 51st meeting between the schools, with Southern Miss leading the all-time series 38–11–1. The previous meeting of the two teams was on August 30, 2008, where the Golden Eagles defeated the Ragin' Cajuns by a score of 51–21.

== Game summary ==
=== Scoring summary ===
Scoring summary

Quarter	Time	Drive			Team	Scoring information	Score	
Quarter	Time	Plays	Yards	TOP	Team	Scoring information	USM	LA
1	9:39	3	67	0:57	USM	Ito Smith 11-yard touchdown run, Parker Shaunfield kick good	7	0
1	7:17	3	70	1:12	USM	Ito Smith 6-yard touchdown reception from Nick Mullens, Parker Shaunfield kick good	14	0
1	3:15	9	66	3:55	LA	Anthony Jennings 4-yard touchdown run, Stevie Artigue kick good	14	7
2	7:28	2	29	0:30	LA	Dion Ray 12-yard touchdown run, Stevie Artigue kick good	14	14
3	10:42	11	75	4:18	USM	Allenzae Staggers 5-yard touchdown reception from Nick Mullens, Parker Shaunfield kick good	21	14
4	12:26	14	83	6:14	USM	Ito Smith 1-yard touchdown reception from Nick Mullens, Parker Shaunfield kick good	28	14
4	5:10	5	19	2:10	LA	Anthony Jennings 3-yard touchdown run, Stevie Artigue kick good	28	21
"TOP" = time of possession. For other American football terms, see Glossary of American football.							28	21

=== Statistics ===
Statistics	USM	LA
First downs	22	21
Plays–yards	74–481	69–252
Rushes–yards	32–135 (4.2)	47–157 (3.3)
Passing yards	346	95
Passing: Comp–Att–Int	25–42–1	8–22–1
Time of possession	30:34	29:26

Team	Category	Player	Statistics
USM	Passing	Nick Mullens	25/40, 346 yds, 2 TD, 1 INT
USM	Rushing	Ito Smith	26 car, 138 yds
USM	Receiving	Allenzae Staggers	11 rec, 230 yds, 1 TD
LA	Passing	Anthony Jennings	8/20, 95 yds, 1 INT
LA	Rushing	Elijah McGuire	17 car, 99 yds
LA	Receiving	Al Riles	5 rec, 64 yds
