= 2016 Louisiana–Lafayette Ragin' Cajuns football team =

American college football season

2016 Louisiana–Lafayette Ragin' Cajuns football

New Orleans Bowl, L 21–28 vs. Southern Miss
- Conference: Sun Belt Conference
- Record: 6–7 (5–3 Sun Belt)
- Head coach: Mark Hudspeth (6th season)
- Offensive coordinator: Jorge Munoz (1st season)
- Offensive scheme: Spread
- Defensive coordinator: Charlie Harbison (2nd season)
- Base defense: 4–3
- Home stadium: Cajun Field

2016 Sun Belt Conference football standings
	Conf.			Overall
Team	W		L	W		L
Appalachian State +	7	–	1	10	–	3
Arkansas State +	7	–	1	8	–	5
Troy	6	–	2	10	–	3
Idaho	6	–	2	9	–	4
Louisiana–Lafayette	5	–	3	6	–	7
Georgia Southern	4	–	4	5	–	7
Louisiana–Monroe	3	–	5	4	–	8
South Alabama	2	–	6	6	–	7
Georgia State	2	–	6	3	–	9
New Mexico State	2	–	6	3	–	9
Texas State	0	–	8	2	–	10
+ – Conference co-champions

The 2016 Louisiana–Lafayette Ragin' Cajuns football team represented the University of Louisiana at Lafayette in the 2016 NCAA Division I FBS football season. They were led by sixth-year head coach Mark Hudspeth and played their home games at Cajun Field in Lafayette, Louisiana. The Ragin' Cajuns were members of the Sun Belt Conference. They finished the season 6–7, 5–3 in Sun Belt play to finish in fifth place. They were invited to the New Orleans Bowl where they lost to Southern Miss.

== Preseason ==
=== Award watchlists ===
Award	Player	Position	Year
Walter Camp Award	Elijah McGuire	RB	SR
Paul Hornung Award	Elijah McGuire	RB	SR
Maxwell Award	Elijah McGuire	RB	SR
Wuerffel Trophy	Karmichael Dunbar	DL	SR

=== Sun Belt Media Day ===
==== Predicted standings ====
Sun Belt Conference predicted standings
Predicted finish	Team	Votes (1st Place)
1	Appalachian State	114 (5)
2	Arkansas State	110 (5)
3	Georgia Southern	98 (1)
4	Georgia State	73
5	Louisiana-Lafayette	70
6	Troy	70
7	South Alabama	62
8	Idaho	48
9	New Mexico State	37
10	Texas State	30
11	Louisiana-Monroe	14

==== Preseason All–Conference Team ====
Offense

QB Brandon Silvers (Troy)
RB Jalin Moore (Appalachian State)
RB Jordan Chunn (Troy)
WR Robert Davis (Georgia State)
WR Al Riles (Louisiana-Lafayette)
WR Emanuel Thompson (Troy)
TE Gerald Everett (South Alabama)
OL Parker Collins (Appalachian State)
OL Colby Gossett (Appalachian State)
OL Jermar Clark (Arkansas State)
OL Andy Kwon (Georgia Southern)
OL Antonio Garcia (Troy)

Defense

DL Chris Odom (Arkansas State)
DL Javon Rolland-Jones (Arkansas State)
DL Randy Allen (South Alabama)
DL Rashad Dillard (Troy)
LB Deshawntee "Ironhead" Gallon (Georgia Southern)
LB Otha Peters (Louisiana-Lafayette)
LB Rodney Butler (New Mexico State)
DB Clifton Duck (Appalachian State)
DB Mondo Williams (Appalachian State)
DB Money Hunter (Arkansas State)
DB Bobby Baker (Georgia State)
DB Jeremy Reaves (South Alabama)

Specialists

PK Younghoe Koo (Georgia Southern)
P Austin Rehkow (Idaho)
RS Jabir Frye (Troy)
AP Jordan Chunn (Troy)

Honorable Mentions

- WR Keenan Barnes
- DL Karmichael Dunbar
- OL Eddie Gordon
- LB Tre'maine Lightfoot

== Roster ==
2016 Louisiana–Lafayette Ragin' Cajuns football team roster
Players
Coaches
Offense

Pos.	#	Name	Class
QB	2	Gunner Hudspeth	Fr
WR	2	Al Riles	Sr
QB	3	Jordan Davis	So
QB	6	Jalen Nixon	Sr
WR	7	Jared Jackson	Jr
QB	8	Dion Ray	Fr
RB	9	Trey Ragas	Fr
TE	10	Matt Barnes	So
QB	11	Anthony Jennings	Sr
WR	13	Elijah McGuire	Jr
QB	16	Jake Arceneaux	Fr
WR	17	Ja'Marcus Bradley	Fr
WR	18	Devin Scott	Sr
WR	19	Michael Jacquet	Fr
WR	20	Jarrod Jackson	Fr
WR	21	Keenan Barnes	So
WR	22	Mark Mornay	Jr
RB	23	Darius Hoggins	Jr
WR	24	Tyler Derouen	Fr
RB	25	Raymond Calais	Fr
RB	25	Ashton Johnson	Fr
WR	26	Cameron Howell	Fr
RB	27	Jordan Wright	Fr
WR	28	Chris Collins	So
RB	29	Justin Boatwright	Jr
TE	31	Alex Allen	Fr
TE	33	Carlos Robinson	Fr
WR	35	Leon Duncan	So
OL	50	Robert Hunt	Fr
OL	53	Christian Cederquist	Jr
OL	60	D'Aquin Withrow	Jr
OL	61	Cole Prudhomme	Fr
OL	63	Raynard Ford	Jr
OL	66	Rico Robinson	Fr
OL	67	Ken Marks	Fr
OL	68	Jacob Wentz	Fr
OL	69	Caden Cunningham	Fr
OL	71	Akkai Ward	Fr
OL	72	Grant Horst	Jr
OL	73	Craig Smith	Jr
OL	74	Staten Wade	So
OL	75	Kevin Dotson	Fr
OL	76	Kendall Baker	Fr
OL	77	Adrian Goodacre	So
OL	78	Allen Cummins	Jr
OL	79	Eddie Gordon	Sr
TE	81	Nick Byrne	Sr
WR	82	Nate Arceneaux	So
WR	83	Trey Green	Fr
WR	84	David Doeker	Fr
WR	85	Calif Gossett	Fr
TE	87	Chris Turner	Fr
WR		Cabron Baham	Fr
WR		Ryheem Malone	Jr

Defense

Pos.	#	Name	Class
DL	3	Joe Dillon	Fr
LB	4	Tre’Maine Lightfoot	Sr
DB	6	Savion Brown	Fr
LB	7	Otha Peters	Sr
DB	8	Simeon Thomas	Jr
DB	9	Kamar Greenhouse	Fr
DB	10	Christian Goodlett	Sr
DB	11	Lorenzo Cryer	So
DB	13	Vince Thomas	So
DB	16	Travis Crawford	Jr
DB	17	Damar’ren Mitchell	Fr
DB	18	Blair Brooks	Fr
DB	19	Troy McCollum	Jr
DB	20	Dominick Jones	Sr
LB	21	Alonzo Brown	Fr
DB	22	Reggie Miles	Sr
DB	23	Tracy Walker	Jr
DB	24	Cole Bourque	Jr
DB	25	Deuce Wallace	Fr
DB	27	Lavarious Varnado	Jr
LB	30	T.J. Posey	Jr
DB	31	Corey Turner	So
DB	34	Denarius Howard	Jr
LB	35	Chaziere Malbrue	So
DB	37	Errol Brown	Fr
LB	38	Terik Miller	Fr
DB	39	Edward Thompson	Jr
LB	41	Caleb Vidrine	Fr
LB	43	Kaleb Fredericks	Fr
LB	44	Tanner Holmes	Fr
LB	45	Shay Laporte	So
DL	46	Jarvis Jefferies	Jr
DL	50	Trev Miller	Jr
LB	51	Trey Granier	Sr
DL	55	Karmicheal Dunbar	Sr
LB	56	Terrence Jones	Fr
LB	57	Tanner Wiggins	Fr
LB	59	Jacques Boudereaux	Fr
DL	90	Kevon Perry	Jr
DL	91	Mario Osborne	So
DL	92	Taboris Lee	Jr
DL	93	Darryl Johnson	Fr
DL	94	Andarious Jones	Fr
DL	95	Rodrick Stephens	Jr
DT	62	Daniel Chapman	Fr
DT	76	Kenndall Baker	Fr
DT	90	Kevon Perry	Sr
DT	92	Taboris Lee	Sr
DT	93	Darryl Johnson	So
DT	94	Andarious Jones	Sr
DT	95	Rodrick Stephens	Jr
DL	96	David Lemoto	Jr
DL	98	Ladarrius Kidd	So
DL	99	Trav’Vontae Booker	Fr

Special teams

Pos.	#	Name	Class
LS	34	Sterling Miller	So
K	36	Stevie Artigue	So
P	37	Steven Coutts	So
K	38	Calvin Linden	Fr
K/P	39	Michael Godley	So
K	47	Dylan Scheurich	So
LS	49	Stephen Morella	Sr
K/P	86	Aaron Bird	So
P	89	Austin Melancon	Fr

Head coach

- Mark Hudspeth (Delta State)

Coordinators/assistant coaches

- Michael Desormeaux (Louisiana)
  Assistant head, wide receivers
- Levron Harbin (North Alabama)
  Assistant head, defensive line
- Charlie Harbison (Gardner–Webb)
  Co-defensive coordinator, defensive backs
- Marquase Lovings (Howard)
  Assistant head, running backs
- Mike Lucas (Liberty)
  Assistant head, recruiting coordinator, linebackers
- Jorge Munoz (Bethany (KS))
  Offensive coordinator, quarterbacks
- Mitch Rodrigue (Nicholls State)
  Run game coordinator, offensive line
- Reed Stringer (Delta State)
  Assistant head, tight ends
- Troy Wingerter (Louisiana)
  Director of football operations
- Ryan Trichel (Southeastern Louisiana)
  Director of player personnel
- Tom Fratcher (Henderson State)
  Assistant player personnel director

Legend

- (C) Team captain
- (S) Suspended
- (I) Ineligible
- Injured
- Redshirt

Roster
Last update: December 31, 2017

== Schedule ==
Date	Time	Opponent	Site	TV	Result	Attendance
September 3	11:00 am	Boise State*	Cajun Field; Lafayette, LA	ASN	L 10–45	22,661
September 10	6:00 pm	No. 11 (FCS) McNeese State*	Cajun Field; Lafayette, LA (Cajun Crown)	ESPN3	W 30–22	26,891
September 17	6:00 pm	South Alabama	Cajun Field; Lafayette, LA	ESPN3	W 28–23	19,208
September 24	7:00 pm	at Tulane*	Yulman Stadium; New Orleans, LA	ESPN3	L 39–41 ^{4OT}	24,253
October 1	7:00 pm	at New Mexico State	Aggie Memorial Stadium; Las Cruces, NM	ESPN3	L 31–37 ^{2OT}	8,142
October 12	7:00 pm	Appalachian State	Cajun Field; Lafayette, LA	ESPN2	L 0–24	16,960
October 22	6:00 pm	at Texas State	Bobcat Stadium; San Marcos, TX	ESPN3	W 27–3	18,278
November 5	4:00 pm	Idaho^{†}	Cajun Stadium; Lafayette, LA	ESPN3	L 13–23	21,367
November 10	6:30 pm	at Georgia Southern	Paulson Stadium; Statesboro, GA	ESPNU	W 33–26	16,786
November 19	11:00 am	at Georgia*	Sanford Stadium; Athens, GA	SECN	L 21–35	92,746
November 26	11:00 am	Arkansas State	Cajun Field; Lafayette, LA	ASN	W 24–19	14,259
December 3	2:00 pm	at Louisiana–Monroe	Malone Stadium; Monroe, LA (Battle on the Bayou)	ESPN3	W 30–3	4,007
December 17	8:00 pm	vs. Southern Miss*	Mercedes-Benz Superdome; New Orleans, LA (New Orleans Bowl)	ESPN	L 21–28	35,061
*Non-conference game; ^{†}Homecoming; Rankings from AP Poll released prior to game; All times are in Central time

Schedule source:

== Game summaries ==
=== Boise State ===
Boise State at Louisiana-Lafayette – Game summary

Quarter	1	2	3	4	Total
Broncos	14	21	3	7	45
Ragin' Cajuns	0	3	0	10	13

at Cajun Field, Lafayette, LA

- Date: September 3
- Game time: 11:00 a.m. CST
- Game weather: 85 °F (29 °C); mostly sunny
- Game attendance: 22,661
- Referee: David Alvarez
- TV: ASN

Game information

First quarter

- BSU - Jeremy McNichols 1-yard TD run, Tyler Rausa kick good, 12:49 (BSU 7-0)
- BSU - Cedrick Wilson 42-yard TD pass from Brett Rypien, Rausa kick good, 8:51 (BSU 14-0)

Second quarter

- BSU - McNichols 48-yard TD pass from Thomas Sperbeck, Rausa kick good, 14:26 (BSU 21-0)
- BSU - McNichols 7-yard TD run, Rausa kick good, 12:35 (BSU 28-0)
- BSU - Sperbeck 35-yard TD pass from Rypien, Rausa kick good, 1:29 (BSU 35-0)
- ULL - Stevie Artigue 44-yard field goal, 0:00 (BSU 35-3)

Third quarter

- BSU - Rausa 30-yard field goal, 4:39 (BSU 38-3)

Fourth quarter

- ULL - Keenan Barnes 11-yard TD pass from Anthony Jennings, Artigue kick good, 12:53 (BSU 38-10)
- BSU - Alexander Mattison 2-yard TD run, Rausa kick good, 8:44 (BSU 45-10)

Top passers

- BSU - Brett Rypien - 22/33, 347 yards, 2 TD
- ULL - Anthony Jennings - 21/33, 186 yards, TD

Top rushers

- BSU - Alexander Mattison - 11 carries, 61 yards, TD
- ULL - Elijah McGuire - 14 carries, 46 yards

Top receivers

- BSU - Tyler Sperbeck - 6 receptions, 130 yards, TD
- ULL - Ja'Marcus Bradley - 3 receptions, 50 yards

Top defenders

- BSU - Tanner Vallejo - 9 tackles, 0.5 sacks
- ULL - Travis Crawford - 10 tackles

=== McNeese State ===
McNeese State at Louisiana-Lafayette – Game summary

Quarter	1	2	3	4	Total
Cowboys	3	9	3	7	22
Ragin' Cajuns	7	7	13	3	30

at Cajun Field, Lafayette, LA

- Date: September 10
- Game time: 6:00 p.m. CST
- Game weather: 79 °F (26 °C); partly cloudy
- Game attendance: 26,891
- Referee: Jason Autrey
- TV: ESPN3

Game information

First quarter

- MCNS - Trent Manuel 33-yard field goal, 8:33 (MCNS 3-0)
- ULL - Ja'Marcus Bradley 17-yard TD pass from Anthony Jennings, Stevie Artigue kick good, 4:11 (ULL 7-3)

Second quarter

- MCNS - Manuel 40-yard field goal, 9:36 (ULL 7-6)
- ULL - Jennings 3-yard TD run, Artigue kick good, 6:14 (ULL 14-6)
- MCNS - Dylan Long 1-yard TD run, two-point conversion no good, 0:30 (ULL 14-12)

Third quarter

- MCNS - Manuel 28-yard field goal, 9:31 (MCNS 15-14)
- ULL - Raymond Calais 7-yard TD run, Artigue kick good, 7:18 (ULL 21-15)
- ULL - Jennings 5-yard TD run, two-point conversion no good, 4:02 (ULL 27-15)

Fourth quarter

- ULL - Artigue 17-yard field goal, 5:01 (ULL 30-15)
- MCNS - Long 3-yard TD run, Manuel kick good, 0:12 (ULL 30-22)

Top passers

- ULL - Anthony Jennings - 15/21, 170 yards, TD
- MCNS - James Tabary - 25/38, 237 yards

Top rushers

- ULL - Elijah McGuire - 19 carries, 139 yards
- MCNS - Ryan Ross - 21 carries, 118 yards

Top receivers

- ULL - Ja'Marcus Bradley - 6 receptions, 97 yards, TD
- MCNS - Kent Shelby - 6 receptions, 75 yards

Top defenders

- ULL - Travis Crawford - 11 tackles
- MCNS - Jammerio Gross-Whitaker - 12 tackles, sack

=== South Alabama ===
South Alabama at Louisiana-Lafayette – Game summary

Quarter	1	2	3	4	Total
Jaguars	0	7	7	9	23
Ragin' Cajuns	6	3	13	6	28

at Cajun Field, Lafayette, LA

- Date: September 17
- Game time: 6:00 p.m. CST
- Game weather: 80 °F (27 °C); cloudy
- Game attendance: 19,208
- Referee: Charles Lewis
- TV: ESPN3

Game information

First quarter

- ULL - Michael Jacquet III 13-yard TD pass from Anthony Jennings, Stevie Artigue kick no good, 4:22 (ULL 6-0)

Second quarter

- USA - Tyreis Thomas 6-yard TD run, Gavin Patterson kick good, 14:13 (USA 7-6)
- ULL - Artigue 31-yard field goal, 0:37 (ULL 9-7)

Third quarter

- ULL - Al Riles 71-yard TD pass from Jennings, Artigue kick no good, 9:46 (ULL 15-7)
- ULL - Keenan Barnes 38-yard TD pass from Jennings, Dylan Schuerich kick good, 4:46 (ULL 22-7)
- USA - Grant Powell 18-yard TD pass from Dallas Davis, Patterson kick good, 1:50 (ULL 22-14)

Fourth quarter

- USA - Patterson 23-yard field goal, 13:36 (ULL 22-17)
- ULL - Elijah McGuire 68-yard TD run, two-point conversion no good, 7:05 (ULL 28-17)
- USA - Gerald Everett 11-yard TD pass from Davis, two-point conversion no good, 3:17 (ULL 28-23)

Top passers

- ULL - Anthony Jennings - 18/26, 256 yards, 3 TD, 2 INT
- USA - Dallas Davis - 21/29, 264 yards, 2 TD

Top rushers

- ULL - Elijah McGuire - 23 carries, 223 yards, TD
- USA - Xavier Johnson - 17 carries, 58 yards

Top receivers

- ULL - Al Riles - 8 receptions, 139 yards, TD
- USA - Gerald Everett - 7 receptions, 83 yards, TD

Top defenders

- ULL - Tre'maine Lightfoot - 10 tackles
- USA - Kalen Jackson - 12 tackles

=== At Tulane ===
Louisiana-Lafayette at Tulane – Game summary

Quarter	1	2	3	4	OT	2OT	3OT	4OT	Total
Ragin' Cajuns	3	3	3	7	7	7	3	6	39
Green Wave	0	6	10	0	7	7	3	8	41

at Yulman Stadium, New Orleans, LA

- Date: September 24
- Game time: 7:00 p.m. CST
- Game weather: 81 °F (27 °C); partly cloudy
- Game attendance: 24,253
- Referee: Jason McArthur
- TV: ESPN3

Game information

First quarter

- ULL - Stevie Artigue 40-yard field goal, 5:16 (ULL 3-0)

Second quarter

- ULL - Artigue 39-yard field goal, 13:48 (ULL 6-0)
- TULN - Andrew DiRocco 22-yard field goal, 10:16 (ULL 6-3)
- TULN - DiRocco 35-yard field goal, 4:16 (TIE 6-6)

Third quarter

- TULN - DiRocco 20-yard field goal, 8:23 (TULN 9-6)
- ULL - Artigue 20-yard field goal, 3:18 (TIE 9-9)
- TULN - Terren Encalade 34-yard TD pass from Glen Cuiellette, DiRocco kick good, 1:07 (TULN 16-9)

Fourth quarter

- ULL - Elijah McGuire 1-yard TD run, Artigue kick good, 5:55 (TIE 16-16)

First overtime

- ULL - Keenan Barnes 10-yard TD pass from Anthony Jennings, Artigue kick good, (ULL 23-16)
- TULN - Encalade 25-yard TD pass from Cuiellette, DiRocco kick good, (TIE 23-23)

Second overtime

- TULN - Darnell Mooney 25-yard TD pass from Cuiellette, DiRocco kick good, (TULN 30-23)
- ULL - McGuire 1-yard TD run, Artigue kick good, (TIE 30-30)

Third overtime

- ULL - Artigue 22-yard field goal, (ULL 33-30)
- TULN - DiRocco 48-yard field goal, (TULN 33-33)

Fourth overtime

- TULN - Encalade 7-yard TD pass from Cuiellette, Cuiellette two-point conversion pass to Kendall Ardoin good, (TULN 41-33)
- ULL - McGuire 22-yard TD pass from Jennings, two-point conversion no good, (TULN 41-39)

Top passers

- TULN - Glen Cuiellette - 10/23, 165 yards, 4 TD, INT
- ULL - Anthony Jennings - 19/38, 240 yards, 2 TD, 2 INT

Top rushers

- TULN - Dontrell Hilliard - 16 carries, 49 yards
- ULL - Elijah McGuire - 38 carries, 89 yards, 2 TD

Top receivers

- TULN - Terren Encalade - 7 receptions, 103 yards, 3 TD
- ULL - Al Riles - 6 receptions, 70 yards

Top defenders

- TULN - Nico Marley - 11 tackles, sack
- ULL - Tre'maine Lightfoot - 12 tackles

=== At New Mexico State ===
Louisiana-Lafayette at New Mexico State – Game summary

Quarter	1	2	3	4	OT	2OT	Total
Ragin' Cajuns	7	6	8	3	7	0	31
Aggies	7	14	0	3	7	6	37

at Aggie Memorial Stadium, Las Cruces, NM

- Date: October 1
- Game time: 7:00 p.m. CST
- Game weather: 82 °F (28 °C); mostly sunny
- Game attendance: 8,142
- Referee: Ted Pitts
- TV: ESPN3

Game information

First quarter

- NMSU - Clayton Granch 19-yard TD pass from Tyler Rodgers, Parker Davidson kick good, 11:25 (NMSU 7-0)
- ULL - Keenan Barnes 5-yard TD pass from Anthony Jennings, Stevie Artigue kick good, 7:15 (TIE 7-7)

Second quarter

- ULL - Artigue 23-yard field goal, 8:55 (ULL 10-7)
- NMSU - Larry Rose III 6-yard TD run, Davidson kick good, 2:19 (NMSU 14-10)
- NMSU - Jaden Wright 45-yard interception return for TD, Davidson kick good, 1:23 (NMSU 21-10)
- ULL - Artigue 41-yard field goal, 0:00 (NMSU 21-13)

Third quarter

- ULL - Jordan Wright 7-yard TD run, Jalen Nixon two-point conversion good to Jared Johnson, 8:19 (TIE 21-21)

Fourth quarter

- NMSU - Davidson 33-yard field goal, 10:31 (NMSU 24-21)
- ULL - Artigue 47-yard field goal, 2:58 (TIE 24-24)

First overtime

- NMSU - Gregory Hogan 23-yard TD pass from Rodgers, Davidson kick good, (NMSU 31-24)
- ULL - Darius Hoggins 0-yard fumble return for TD, Artigue kick good, (TIE 31-31)

Second overtime

- NMSU - Sebastian Anderson 0-yard fumble return for TD, (NMSU 37-31)

Top passers

- NMSU - Tyler Rodgers - 31/49, 359 yards, 2 TD, 2 INT
- ULL - Anthony Jennings - 12/22, 143 yards, TD, 2 INT

Top rushers

- NMSU - Larry Rose III - 23 carries, 112 yards, TD
- ULL - Darius Hoggins - 12 carries, 81 yards, TD

Top receivers

- NMSU - Gregory Hogan - 11 receptions, 172 yards, TD
- ULL - Al Riles - 8 receptions, 110 yards

Top defenders

- NMSU - Jacob Nwangwa - 19 tackles
- ULL - Otha Peters - 18 tackles, sack

=== Appalachian State ===
Appalachian State at Louisiana-Lafayette – Game summary

Quarter	1	2	3	4	Total
Mountaineers	10	14	0	0	24
Ragin' Cajuns	0	0	0	0	0

at Cajun Field, Lafayette, LA

- Date: October 12
- Game time: 7:00 p.m. CST
- Game weather: 81 °F (27 °C); clear
- Game attendance: 16,960
- Referee: Jason McArthur
- TV: ESPN2

Game information

First quarter

- APST - Jalin Moore 2-yard TD run, Michael Rubino kick good, 12:34 (APST 7-0)
- APST - Rubino 21-yard field goal, 5:13 (APST 10-0)

Second quarter

- APST - Moore 41-yard TD run, Rubino kick good, 13:36 (APST 17-0)
- APST - Collin Reed 8-yard TD pass from Taylor Lamb, Rubino kick good, 5:43 (APST 24-0)

Top passers

- APST - Taylor Lamb - 15/26, 201 yards, TD, INT
- ULL - Anthony Jennings - 19/32, 121 yards

Top rushers

- APST - Jalin Moore - 14 carries, 106 yards, 2 TD
- ULL - Elijah McGuire - 10 carries, 43 yards

Top receivers

- APST - Shaedon Meadors - 6 receptions, 128 yards
- ULL - Michael Jacquet - 5 receptions, 40 yards

Top defenders

- APST - Devan Stringer - 11 tackles
- ULL - Denarius Howard - 6 tackles

=== At Texas State ===
Louisiana-Lafayette at Texas State – Game summary

Quarter	1	2	3	4	Total
Ragin' Cajuns	3	10	7	7	27
Bobcats	3	0	0	0	3

at Bobcat Stadium, San Marcos, TX

- Date: October 22
- Game time: 6:00 p.m. CST
- Game weather: 71 °F (22 °C); clear
- Game attendance: 18,278
- Referee: Marc Curles
- TV: ESPN3

Game information

First quarter

- TXST - Marcus Ripley 29-yard field goal, 10:37 (TXST 3-0)
- ULL - Stevie Artigue 36-yard field goal, 1:39 (TIE 3-3)

Second quarter

- ULL - Elijah McGuire 4-yard TD run, Artigue kick good, 8:53 (ULL 10-3)
- ULL - Artigue 42-yard field goal, 0:00 (ULL 13-3)

Third quarter

- ULL - McGuire 1-yard TD run, Artigue kick good, 7:56 (ULL 20-3)

Fourth quarter

- ULL - Keenan Barnes 18-yard TD pass from Anthony Jennings, Artigue kick good, 8:17 (ULL 27-3)

Top passers

- ULL - Anthony Jennings - 17/21, 156 yards, TD, INT
- TXST - Tyler Jones - 20/28, 142 yards, INT

Top rushers

- ULL - Elijah McGuire - 20 carries, 112 yards, 2 TD
- TXST - Stedman Mayberry - 17 carries, 54 yards

Top receivers

- ULL - Michael Jacquet - 2 receptions, 54 yards
- TXST - Elijah King - 2 receptions, 42 yards

Top defenders

- ULL - Tre'maine Lightfoot - 8 tackles
- TXST - Bryan London II - 10 tackles

=== Idaho ===
Idaho at Louisiana-Lafayette – Game summary

Quarter	1	2	3	4	Total
Vandals	10	7	3	3	23
Ragin' Cajuns	3	10	0	0	13

at Cajun Field, Lafayette, LA

- Date: November 5
- Game time: 4:00 p.m. CST
- Game weather: 81 °F (27 °C); clear
- Game attendance: 21,387
- Referee: Kevin Stine
- TV: ESPN3

Game information

First quarter

- IDAHO - Denzal Brantley 1-yard TD run, Austin Rehkow kick good, 10:15 (IDAHO 7-0)
- ULL - Stevie Artigue 37-yard field goal, 8:13 (IDAHO 7-3)
- IDAHO - Rehkow 29-yard field goal, 4:51 (IDAHO 10-3)

Second quarter

- ULL - Anthony Jennings 3-yard TD run, Artigue kick good, 13:31 (TIE 10-10)
- IDAHO - Isaiah Saunders 1-yard TD run, Rehkow kick good, 4:33 (IDAHO 17-10)
- ULL - Artigue 29-yard field goal, 0:28 (IDAHO 17-13)

Third quarter

- IDAHO - Rehkow 50-yard field goal, 4:29 (IDAHO 20-13)

Fourth quarter

- IDAHO - Rehkow 44-yard field goal, 7:22 (IDAHO 23-13)

Top passers

- IDAHO - Matt Linehan - 20/30, 227 yards
- ULL - Anthony Jennings - 17/30, 161 yards

Top rushers

- IDAHO - Isaiah Saunders - 21 carries, 86 yards, TD
- ULL - Elijah McGuire - 17 carries, 55 yards

Top receivers

- IDAHO - Isaiah Saunders - 5 receptions, 55 yards
- ULL - Michael Jacquet - 3 receptions, 77 yards

Top defenders

- IDAHO - Tony Lashley - 13 tackles
- ULL - Tre'maine Lightfoot - 13 tackles

=== At Georgia Southern ===
Louisiana-Lafayette at Georgia Southern – Game summary

Quarter	1	2	3	4	Total
Ragin' Cajuns	7	14	10	2	33
Eagles	3	10	0	13	26

at Paulson Stadium, Statesboro, GA

- Date: November 10
- Game time: 6:30 p.m. CST
- Game weather: 49 °F (9 °C); calm
- Game attendance: 16,786
- Referee: Charles Lewis
- TV: ESPNU

Game information

First quarter

- GASO - Younghoe Koo 39-yard field goal, 10:44 (GASO 3-0)
- ULL - Elijah McGuire 1-yard TD run, Stevie Artigue kick good, 3:15 (ULL 7-3)

Second quarter

- GASO - Koo 27-yard field goal, 10:48 (ULL 7-6)
- ULL - Dion Ray 16-yard TD run, Artigue kick good, 6:09 (ULL 14-6)
- GASO - Myles Campbell 10-yard TD pass from Seth Shuman, Koo kick good, 1:18 (ULL 14-13)
- ULL - Anthony Jennings 10-yard TD run, Artigue kick good, 0:06 (ULL 21-13)

Third quarter

- ULL - Artigue 34-yard field goal, 8:51 (ULL 24-13)
- ULL - Keenan Barnes 48-yard TD pass from Al Riles, Artigue kick good, 6:34 (ULL 31-13)

Fourth quarter

- GASO - L.A. Ramsby 2-yard TD run, two-point pass conversion no good, 13:05 (ULL 31-19)
- ULL - Otha Peters defensive PAT conversion, 13:05 (ULL 33-19)
- GASO - L.A. Ramsby 1-yard TD run, Koo kick good, 4:23 (ULL 33-26)

Top passers

- ULL - Anthony Jennings - 17/26, 210 yards
- GASO - Seth Shuman - 21/36, 228 yards, TD

Top rushers

- ULL - Anthony Jennings - 9 carries, 96 yards, TD
- GASO - Seth Shuman - 5 carries, 20 yards

Top receivers

- ULL - Keenan Barnes - 3 receptions, 89 yards, TD
- GASO - BJ Johnson III - 9 receptions, 127 yards

Top defenders

- ULL - Otha Peters - 8 tackles, fumble recovery, safety
- GASO - Ukeme Eligwe - 12 tackles

=== At Georgia ===
Louisiana-Lafayette at Georgia – Game summary

Quarter	1	2	3	4	Total
Ragin' Cajuns	0	7	0	14	21
Bulldogs	14	7	7	7	35

at Sanford Stadium, Athens, GA

- Date: November 19
- Game time: 11:00 a.m. CST
- Game weather: 61 °F (16 °C); fair
- Game attendance: 92,746
- Referee: James Carter
- TV: SEC Network

Game information

First quarter

- UGA - Isaiah McKenzie 55-yard TD run, Rodrigo Blankenship kick good, 14:37 (UGA 7-0)
- UGA - McKenzie 82-yard punt return for TD, Blankenship kick good, 8:30 (UGA 14-0)

Second quarter

- UGA - Isaac Nauta 9-yard TD pass from Jacob Eason, Blankenship kick good, 2:50 (UGA 21-0)
- ULL - Anthony Jennings 9-yard TD run, Stevie Artigue kick good, 2:04 (UGA 21-7)

Third quarter

- UGA - Nick Chubb 1-yard TD run, Blankenship kick good, 4:45 (UGA 28-7)

Fourth quarter

- UGA - Chubb 49-yard TD pass from Eason, Blankenship kick good, 9:34 (UGA 35-7)
- ULL - Jennings 13-yard TD run, Artigue kick good, 4:50 (UGA 35-14)
- ULL - Jennings 1-yard TD run, Artigue kick good, 1:34 (UGA 35-21)

Top passers

- UGA - Jacob Eason - 13/19, 165 yards, 2 TD, INT
- ULL - Anthony Jennings - 14/24, 189 yards, 3 INT

Top rushers

- UGA - Nick Chubb - 16 carries, 108 yards, TD
- ULL - Elijah McGuire - 19 carries, 129 yards

Top receivers

- UGA - Nick Chubb - 1 reception, 49 yards, TD
- ULL - Al Riles - 7 receptions, 105 yards

Top defenders

- UGA - Roquan Smith - 7 tackles
- ULL - Travis Crawford - 9 tackles

=== Arkansas State ===
Arkansas State at Louisiana-Lafayette – Game summary

Quarter	1	2	3	4	Total
Red Wolves	7	0	3	9	19
Ragin' Cajuns	7	7	7	3	24

at Cajun Field, Lafayette, LA

- Date: November 26
- Game time: 11:00 a.m. CST
- Game weather: 63 °F (17 °C); partly cloudy
- Game attendance: 14,259
- Referee: Kevin Stine
- TV: ASN

Game information

First quarter

- ARST - Dijon Paschal 24-yard TD pass from Justice Hansen, J.D. Houston kick good, 6:41 (ARST 7-0)
- ULL - Taboris Lee 17-yard interception return for TD, Stevie Artigue kick good, 4:52 (TIE 7-7)

Second quarter

- ULL - Elijah McGuire 14-yard TD pass from Anthony Jennings, Artigue kick good, 8:29 (ULL 14-7)

Third quarter

- ARST - Houston 20-yard field goal, 8:54 (ULL 14-10)
- ULL - Al Riles 34-yard TD pass from Jennings, Artigue kick good, 8:08 (ULL 21-10)

Fourth quarter

- ARST - Houston 30-yard field goal, 14:57 (ULL 21-13)
- ULL - Artigue 34-yard field goal, 10:24 (ULL 24-13)
- ARST - Warren Wand 1-yard TD run, two-point conversion pass no good, 9:07 (ULL 24-19)

Top passers

- ULL - Anthony Jennings - 13/24, 242 yards, 2 TD
- ARST - Justice Hansen - 35/57, 393 yards, TD, INT

Top rushers

- ULL - Elijah McGuire - 10 carries, 27 yards
- ARST - Justice Hansen - 10 carries, 47 yards

Top receivers

- ULL - Ja'Marcus Bradley - 4 receptions, 113 yards
- ARST - Kendall Sanders - 6 receptions, 90 yards

Top defenders

- ULL - Christian Goodlett - 12 tackles
- ARST - Ja'Von Rolland-Jones - 10 tackles, 2 sacks

=== At Louisiana–Monroe ===
Louisiana-Lafayette at Louisiana-Monroe – Game summary

Quarter	1	2	3	4	Total
Ragin' Cajuns	7	17	6	0	30
Warhawks	3	0	0	0	3

at Malone Stadium, Monroe, LA

- Date: December 3
- Game time: 2:00 p.m. CST
- Game weather: 48 °F (9 °C); cloudy, rain
- Game attendance: 4,007
- Referee: Kevin Stine
- TV: ESPN3

Game information

First quarter

- ULL - Elijah McGuire 1-yard TD run, Stevie Artigue kick good, 8:53 (ULL 7-0)
- ULM - Craig Ford 23-yard field goal, 5:22 (ULL 7-3)

Second quarter

- ULL - Trev Miller 73-yard fumble return for TD, Artigue kick good, 10:28 (ULL 14-3)
- ULL - Otha Peters 29-yard fumble return for TD, Artigue kick good, 5:10 (ULL 21-3)
- ULL - Artigue 26-yard field goal, 0:00 (ULL 24-3)

Third quarter

- ULL - Artigue 35-yard field goal, 7:08 (ULL 27-3)
- ULL - Artigue 37-yard field goal, 0:23 (ULL 30-3)

Top passers

- ULL - Anthony Jennings - 2/5, 0 yards, 2 INT
- ULM - Caleb Evans - 3/14, 31 yards, 2 INT

Top rushers

- ULL - Elijah McGuire - 28 carries, 110 yards, TD
- ULM - Austin Vaughn - 11 carries, 61 yards

Top receivers

- ULL - Al Riles - 1 reception, 0 yards
- ULM - Nathan Meadors Jr. - 1 reception, 15 yards

Top defenders

- ULL - Karmichael Dunbar - 4 tackles
- ULM - Wesley Thompson - 15 tackles

=== Southern Miss (New Orleans Bowl) ===
Southern Mississippi vs. Louisiana-Lafayette – Game summary

Quarter	1	2	3	4	Total
Golden Eagles	14	0	7	7	28
Ragin' Cajuns	7	7	0	7	21

at Mercedes-Benz Superdome, New Orleans, LA

- Date: December 17
- Game time: 8:00 p.m. CST
- Game weather: 74 °F (23 °C); N/A (indoors)
- Game attendance: 35,061
- Referee: Tom Stapleton
- TV: ESPN

Game information

First quarter

- USM - Ito Smith 11-yard TD run, Parker Shaunfield kick good, 9:39 (USM 7-0)
- USM - Smith 6-yard TD pass from Nick Mullens, Shaunfield kick good, 7:17 (USM 14-0)
- ULL - Anthony Jennings 4-yard TD run, Stevie Artigue kick good, 3:15 (USM 14-7)

Second quarter

- ULL - Dion Ray 12-yard TD run, Artigue kick good, 7:28 (TIE 14-14)

Third quarter

- USM - Allenzae Staggers 5-yard TD pass from Mullens, Shaunfield kick good, 10:42 (USM 21-14)

Fourth quarter

- USM - Smith 1-yard TD run, Shaunfield kick good, 12:26 (USM 28-14)
- ULL - Jennings 3-yard TD run, Artigue kick good, 5:10 (USM 28-21)

Top passers

- USM - Nick Mullens - 25/40, 346 yards, 2 TD, INT
- ULL - Anthony Jennings - 8/20, 95 yards, INT

Top rushers

- USM - Ito Smith - 26 carries, 138 yards, 2 TD
- ULL - Elijah McGuire - 17 carries, 99 yards

Top receivers

- USM - Allenzae Staggers - 11 receptions, 230 yards, TD
- ULL - Al Riles - 5 receptions, 64 yards

Top defenders

- USM - Ja'Boree Poole - 9 tackles, 3 sacks
- ULL - Christian Goodlett - 7 tackles
