= Jay Hopson =

American football player and coach (born 1968)

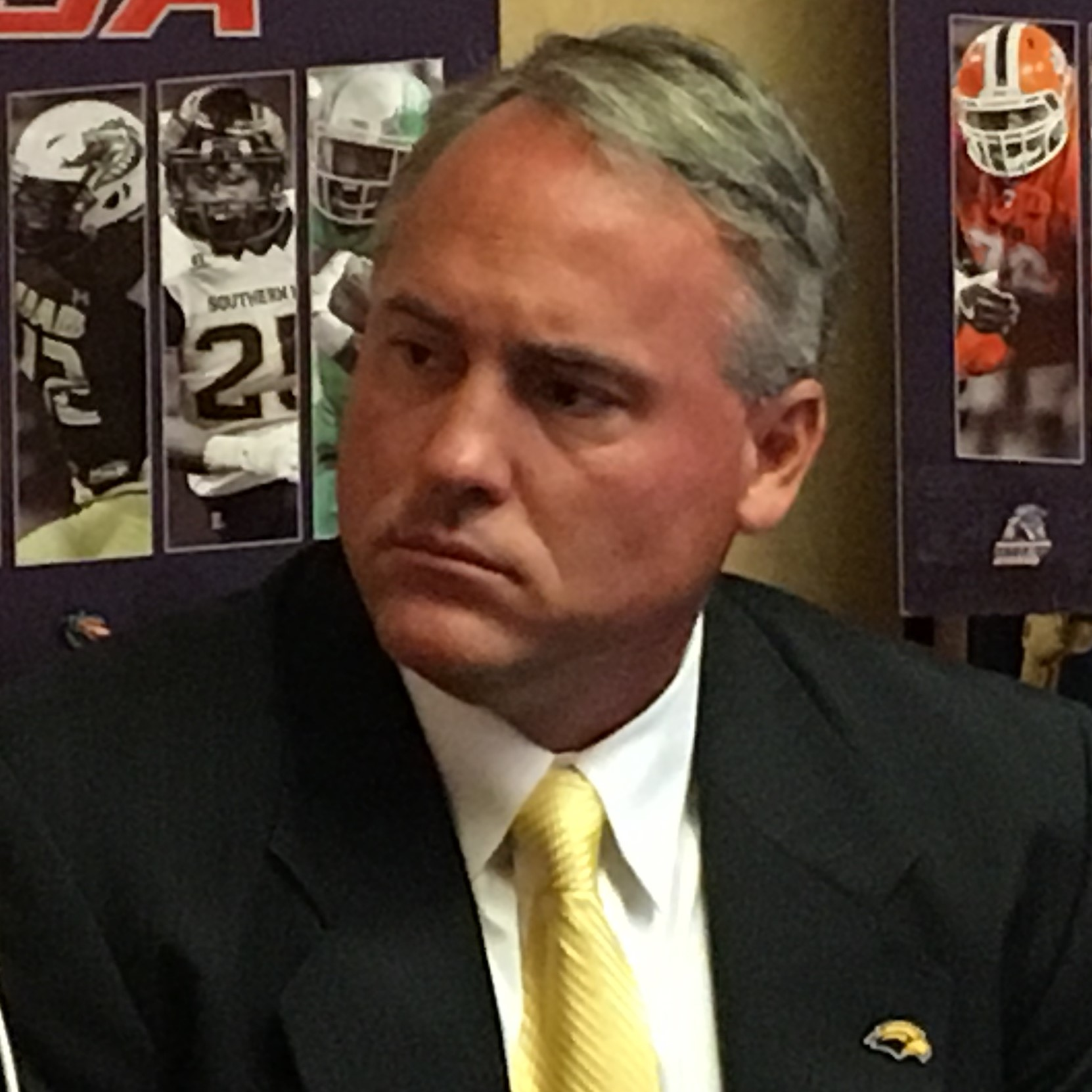
- Hopson at 2017 C-USA Media Days

Current position
- Title: Athletic Director
- Team: Starkville High School

Biographical details
- Born: October 13, 1968 (age 58); Vicksburg, Mississippi, U.S.
- Education: Ole Miss; Delta State

Playing career
- 1988–1991: Ole Miss
- Position: Safety

Coaching career (HC unless noted)
- 1992: Tulane (GA)
- 1993: Delta State (DB)
- 1994: LSU (GA)
- 1995: Florida (GA)
- 1996–2000: Marshall (DB)
- 2001–2003: Southern Miss (DB)
- 2004: Ole Miss (DB/RC)
- 2005: Southern Miss (DC/DB)
- 2006–2007: Southern Miss (DC/MLB)
- 2008–2009: Michigan (LB)
- 2010–2011: Memphis (DC/S)
- 2012–2015: Alcorn State
- 2016–2020: Southern Miss
- 2021–2022: Mississippi State (DA/DHSR)
- 2023–2024: South Alabama (CB)
- 2025-present: Starkville High School (AD)

Head coaching record
- Overall: 60–40
- Bowls: 1–3

Accomplishments and honors

Championships
- 2× SWAC (2014, 2015); 2× SWAC East Division (2014, 2015); 1 black college national (2014)

James Walter Hopson (born October 13, 1968) is an American college football coach and former player. He was most recently the cornerbacks coach for the University of South Alabama from 2023 to 2024. He has been a head coach at Southern Miss and Alcorn State. In the latter role, he was the first white head football coach in the history of the Southwestern Athletic Conference, an organization composed of historically black colleges and universities. Hopson has also served as an assistant coach at Tulane, Delta State, LSU, Florida, Marshall, Southern Miss, Ole Miss, Michigan, and Memphis.

== Coaching career ==
Hopson's coaching career began with a stint as a graduate assistant with Tulane in 1992. Delta State hired him to coach defensive backs for the 1993 season. He left Delta State in July 1994 to be a graduate assistant at LSU. For 1995, he was a graduate assistant at Florida during that team's Southeastern Conference (SEC) championship run.

=== Marshall ===
Following the 1995 season, Marshall hired Florida defensive coordinator Bob Pruett as its new head coach, and Hopson joined his staff as defensive backs coach. 1996 was Marshall's final season at the Division I-AA level and the team won the I-AA championship. In 1997, Marshall moved up to NCAA Division I-A and competed as a member of the Mid-American Conference. Under Hopson, the 1999 and 2000 teams led the country in interceptions.

=== Southern Miss and Ole Miss ===
Southern Miss hired Hopson as its defensive backs coach in 2001. Hopson succeeded Tyrone Nix, who was elevated to defensive coordinator to replace Dave Wommack. Hopson coached defensive backs from 2001–2003, during which time Southern Miss' pass defense was one of the best in the country. In 2004, Hopson returned to Ole Miss, his alma mater, to improve its defensive backfield. Ole Miss fired head coach David Cutcliffe at the end of the season, and Hopson returned to Southern Miss as defensive coordinator.

Hopson served as defensive coordinator from 2005–2007 under long-time head coach Jeff Bower. Southern Miss forced Bower to resign following the 2007 season, and new head coach Larry Fedora did not retain Hopson for his staff.

=== Michigan and Memphis ===
Michigan hired Hopson in January 2008 to coach linebackers under incoming head coach Rich Rodriguez. Hopson departed Michigan after the 2009 season to become defensive coordinator at Memphis under new head coach Larry Porter. Hopson resigned from Memphis on September 14, 2011, following consecutive blowout losses against Mississippi State and Arkansas State. Mike DuBose and Galen Scott succeeded Hopson as co-defensive coordinators. Hopson was offered–and declined–an opportunity to remain on staff in a different role. Memphis fired Porter at the end of the season.

=== Alcorn State ===
Alcorn State hired Hopson to be its head football coach on May 28, 2012. Hopson was the first white head football coach in the history of the Southwestern Athletic Conference, which is composed of historically black colleges and universities. Hopson succeeded Melvin Spears, under whom the program had gone 2–8 the previous year. Hopson was head coach at Alcorn State for four seasons, from 2012–2015. His overall record at Alcorn State was 32–17. Both the 2014 and 2015 teams won the SWAC Championship Game; the 2014 was named the black college football national champion.

=== Southern Miss ===
Hopson returned to Southern Miss on January 30, 2016, this time as its head coach. Hopson coached four full seasons with Southern Miss, resigning after the first game of the 2020 season. His overall record at Southern Miss was 28–23, with one win in three bowl appearances. A highlight of Hopson's tenure was a 2015 win against Kentucky, Southern Miss' first win against an SEC school since 2000. Co-offensive coordinator Scotty Walden succeeded Hopson as interim head coach.

=== Mississippi State and South Alabama ===
Mike Leach hired Hopson as a defensive analyst and Director of High School Relations at Mississippi State in March 2021. Leach died unexpectedly on December 12, 2022, at the age of 61.

South Alabama hired Hopson as its cornerbacks coach in January 2023. Head coach Kane Wommack was a walk-on at Southern Miss in 2007 when Hopson was defensive coordinator there, and Kane's father Dave was linebackers coach at the time. Kane Wommack departed South Alabama after the 2023 season to become defensive coordinator at Alabama; new head coach Major Applewhite retained Hopson on his staff. Hopson would step down from South Alabama on January 7, 2025.

== Head coaching record ==
| Year | Team | Overall | Conference | Standing | Bowl/playoffs |
|---|---|---|---|---|---|
Alcorn State Braves (Southwestern Athletic Conference) (2012–2015)
| 2012 | Alcorn State | 4–7 | 4–5 | 5th (East) | |
| 2013 | Alcorn State | 9–3 | 7–2 | T–2nd (East) | |
| 2014 | Alcorn State | 10–3 | 7–2 | 1st (East) | |
| 2015 | Alcorn State | 9–4 | 7–2 | 1st (East) | L Celebration |
| Alcorn State: | | 32–17 | 25–11 | | |
Southern Miss Golden Eagles (Conference USA) (2016–2020)
| 2016 | Southern Miss | 7–6 | 4–4 | 3rd (West) | W New Orleans |
| 2017 | Southern Miss | 8–5 | 6–2 | 3rd (West) | L Independence |
| 2018 | Southern Miss | 6–5 | 5–3 | T–2nd (West) | |
| 2019 | Southern Miss | 7–6 | 5–3 | 3rd (West) | L Armed Forces |
| 2020 | Southern Miss | 0–1 | | (West) | |
| Southern Miss: | | 28–23 | 20–12 | | |
| Total: | | 60–40 | | | |
National championship Conference title Conference division title or championship game berth
