= Anthony Jennings (American football) =

American football player (born 1994)

No. 10, 11
- Position: Quarterback

Personal information
- Born: October 31, 1994 (age 32); Marietta, Georgia, U.S.
- Listed height: 6 ft 2 in (1.88 m)
- Listed weight: 231 lb (105 kg)

Career information
- High school: Marietta (GA)
- College: LSU (2013–2015); Louisiana–Lafayette (2016)
- NFL draft: 2017: undrafted

Anthony Jennings (born October 31, 1994) is an American former college football quarterback. He played college football at Louisiana State University (LSU) from 2013 and the University of Louisiana at Lafayette in 2016. Jennings was the starting quarterback for the LSU Tigers during the 2014 season and the Louisiana–Lafayette Ragin' Cajuns for the 2016 season.

== Early life ==
Jennings attended Marietta High School in Marietta, Georgia, where he played high school football. He was ranked by Rivals.com as a four-star recruit and the sixth best dual-threat quarterback in the 2013 recruiting class. ESPN.com ranked Jennings as the eighth best dual-threat quarterback in his class. Jennings committed to play college football at Louisiana State University in June 2012.

== College career ==
As a true freshman in 2013, Jennings was the backup quarterback to Zach Mettenberger. After Mettenberger tore his ACL, Jennings started the 2014 Outback Bowl against Iowa. Overall, he appeared in nine games, passing for 181 yards, one touchdown and one interception. Jennings entered his sophomore season in 2014 as LSU's starting quarterback. That season, Jennings started 12 of LSU's 13 games, throwing for 1,611 yards and 11 touchdowns. In 2015, Jennings lost the starting quarterback job to Brandon Harris. On March 10, 2016, LSU announced that Jennings intended to transfer to another school. At the time of the announcement, he was scheduled to graduate from LSU in the summer of 2016. As a graduate transfer, he would be eligible to play immediately at his new school.

In July 2016, Jennings transferred to the University of Louisiana at Lafayette. He entered the 2016 season at Louisiana–Lafayette in a competition with sophomore Jordan Davis for the starting quarterback role. Jennings won the starting job, and helped lead ULL to an appearance in the New Orleans Bowl against the Southern Mississippi Golden Eagles, which Louisiana-Lafayette lost. This was the last season of Jennings' college football career, as he was denied an NCAA waiver which would have allowed him to play in 2017.

== Arrest ==
Jennings and two of his teammates at LSU were arrested in June 2015. All charges against them were later dropped.
