= 2016 Southern Miss Golden Eagles football team =

American college football season

2016 Southern Miss Golden Eagles football

New Orleans Bowl champion

New Orleans Bowl, W 28–21 vs. Louisiana–Lafayette
- Conference: Conference USA
- West Division
- Record: 7–6 (4–4 C-USA)
- Head coach: Jay Hopson (1st season)
- Offensive coordinator: Shannon Dawson (1st season)
- Offensive scheme: Spread
- Defensive coordinator: Tony Pecoraro (1st season)
- Base defense: 4–3
- Home stadium: M. M. Roberts Stadium

2016 Conference USA football standings
	Conf.			Overall
Team	W		L	W		L
East Division
Western Kentucky xy$	7	–	1	11	–	3
Old Dominion x	7	–	1	10	–	3
Middle Tennessee	5	–	3	8	–	5
FIU	4	–	4	4	–	8
Charlotte	3	–	5	4	–	8
Marshall	2	–	6	3	–	9
Florida Atlantic	2	–	6	3	–	9
West Division
Louisiana Tech xy	6	–	2	9	–	5
UTSA	5	–	3	6	–	7
Southern Miss	4	–	4	7	–	6
North Texas	3	–	5	5	–	8
Rice	2	–	6	3	–	9
UTEP	2	–	6	4	–	8
Championship: Western Kentucky 58, Louisiana Tech 44
$ – Conference champion; x – Division champion/co-champions; y – Championship game participant; Rankings from AP Poll

The 2016 Southern Miss Golden Eagles football team represented the University of Southern Mississippi in the 2016 NCAA Division I FBS football season. The Golden Eagles played their home games at the M. M. Roberts Stadium in Hattiesburg, Mississippi, and competed in the West Division of Conference USA (C–USA). They were led by first-year head coach Jay Hopson. They finished the season 7–6, 4–4 in C-USA play to finish in third place in the West Division. They were invited to the New Orleans Bowl where they defeated Louisiana–Lafayette.

== Schedule ==
Southern Miss announced its 2016 football schedule on February 4, 2016. The 2016 schedule consists of 6 home and away games in the regular season. The Golden Eagles will host C–USA foes Charlotte, Marshall, Louisiana Tech, and Rice, and will travel to North Texas, Old Dominion, UTEP, and UTSA.

The team will play four non–conference games, two home games against Savannah State from the Mid-Eastern Athletic Conference and Troy from the Sun Belt Conference, and two road games against Kentucky and LSU both from the Southeastern Conference (SEC).

Date	Time	Opponent	Site	TV	Result	Attendance
September 3	6:30 pm	at Kentucky*	Commonwealth Stadium; Lexington, KY	ESPNU	W 44–35	57,230
September 10	6:00 pm	Savannah State*	M. M. Roberts Stadium; Hattiesburg, MS		W 56–0	29,509
September 17	6:00 pm	Troy*	M. M. Roberts Stadium; Hattiesburg, MS	beIN	L 31–37	27,905
September 24	7:00 pm	at UTEP	Sun Bowl; El Paso, TX	CI	W 34–7	21,419
October 1	6:00 pm	Rice	M. M. Roberts Stadium; Hattiesburg, MS		W 44–28	28,325
October 8	11:00 am	at UTSA	Alamodome; San Antonio, TX	ASN	L 32–55	19,818
October 15	6:30 pm	at LSU*	Tiger Stadium; Baton Rouge, LA	SECN	L 10–45	102,164
October 29	6:00 pm	Marshall^{†}	M. M. Roberts Stadium; Hattiesburg, MS	ASN	W 24–14	31,275
November 5	2:30 pm	Charlotte	M. M. Roberts Stadium; Hattiesburg, MS	ASN	L 27–38	28,347
November 12	2:30 pm	at Old Dominion	Foreman Field; Norfolk, VA	ASN	L 35–51	20,118
November 19	4:30 pm	at North Texas	Apogee Stadium; Denton, TX	beIN	L 23–29	19,120
November 26	3:00 pm	Louisiana Tech	M. M. Roberts Stadium; Hattiesburg, MS (Rivalry in Dixie)	ESPNews	W 39–24	26,164
December 17	8:00 pm	vs. Louisiana–Lafayette*	Mercedes-Benz Superdome; New Orleans, LA (New Orleans Bowl)	ESPN	W 28–21	35,061
*Non-conference game; ^{†}Homecoming; All times are in Central time

Schedule source:

== Game summaries ==
=== @ Kentucky ===
Week One: Southern Miss Golden Eagles at Kentucky Wildcats – Game summary

Quarter	1	2	3	4	Total
Golden Eagles	7	10	21	6	44
Wildcats	21	14	0	0	35

at Commonwealth Stadium, Lexington, KY

- Date: September 3
- Game time: 6:30 p.m. CDT
- Game weather: 76° F • ENE 7 • Sunny
- Game attendance: 57,230
- Referee: Ken Antee
- TV: ESPNU
- Southern Miss vs Kentucky

Game information

First quarter

- 9:37 Southern Miss – Ito Smith 8 yard run (Parker Shaunfield kick), Southern Miss 7–0. Drive: 7 plays, 49 yards, 3:36
- 6:09 Kentucky – Jeff Badet 72 yard pass from Drew Barker (Austin MacGinnis kick), Tied 7–7. Drive: 2 plays, 75 yards, 0:40
- 4:03 Kentucky – Garrett Johnson 43 yard pass from Drew Barker (Austin MacGinnis kick), Kentucky 14–7. Drive: 2 plays, 58 yards, 0:33
- 0:25 Kentucky – Kayaune Ross 9 yard pass from Drew Barker (Austin MacGinnis kick), Kentucky 21–7. Drive: 7 plays, 65 yards, 2:04

Second quarter

- 6:55 Kentucky – Garrett Johnson 53 yard pass from Drew Barker (Austin MacGinnis kick), Kentucky 28–7. Drive: 2 plays, 49 yards, 0:24
- 2:46 Southern Miss – Parker Shaunfield 31 yard field goal, Kentucky 28–10. Drive: 10 plays, 64 yards, 4:02
- 0:56 Kentucky – Jojo Kemp 7 yard run (Austin MacGinnis kick), Kentucky 35–10. Drive: 5 plays, 64 yards, 1:42
- 0:26 Southern Miss – Isaiah Jones 71 yard pass from Nick Mullens (Parker Shaunfield kick), Kentucky 35–17. Drive: 3 plays, 84 yards, 0:22

Third quarter

- 10:36 Southern Miss – Nick Mullens 1 yard run (Parker Shaunfield kick), Kentucky 35–24. Drive: 11 plays, 84 yards, 4:20
- 6:45 Southern Miss – Julian Allen 18 yard pass from Nick Mullens (Parker Shaunfield kick), Kentucky 35–31. Drive: 8 plays, 66 yards, 2:39
- 1:01 Southern Miss – Nick Mullens 1 yard run (Parker Shaunfield kick), Southern Miss 38–35. Drive: 10 plays, 57 yards, 3:32

Fourth quarter

- 10:30 Southern Miss – Parker Shaunfield 49 yard field goal, Southern Miss 41–35. Drive: 12 plays, 56 yards, 4:54
- 2:24 Southern Miss – Parker Shaunfield 25 yard field goal, Southern Miss 44–35. Drive: 11 plays, 62 yards, 4:56

Leading Passers

- USM – Nick Mullens, 18–28, 258 yards, 2 TD, 3 INT
- UK – Drew Barker, 15–24, 323 yards, 4 TD, 1 INT

Leading Rushers

- USM – Ito Smith, 36 carries, 173 yards, 1 TD
- UK – Stanley "Boom" Williams, 13 carries, 94 yards

Leading Receivers

- USM – Isaiah Jones, 3 receptions, 93 yards, 1 TD
- UK – Garrett Johnson, 6 receptions, 143 yards, 2 TD

Leading Tacklers

- USM – Bradley Dylan, 7 tackles, 1 sack
- UK – Jordan Jones, 19 tackles, 1 sack

=== Savannah State ===
Week Two: Savannah State Tigers at Southern Miss Golden Eagles – Game summary

Quarter	1	2	3	4	Total
Tigers	0	0	0	0	0
Golden Eagles	21	28	7	0	56

at M. M. Roberts Stadium, Hattiesburg, MS

- Date: September 10
- Game time: 6:00 p.m. CDT
- Game weather: 92° F • 4 mph • Clear
- Game attendance: 29,509
- Referee: Justin Elliot
- Southern Miss vs Savannah State

Game information

First quarter

- 5:33 Southern Miss – Nick Mullens 1 yard run (Parker Shaunfield kick), Southern Miss 7–0. Drive: 12 plays, 78 yards, 4:48
- 1:35 Southern Miss – Korey Robertson 22 yard pass from Nick Mullens (Parker Shaunfield kick), Southern Miss 14–0. Drive: 6 plays, 47 yards, 1:44
- 0:00 Southern Miss – Ito Smith 86 yard run (Parker Shaunfield kick), Southern Miss 21–0. Drive: 1 play, 76 yards, 0:00

Second quarter

- 11:29 Southern Miss – Isaiah Jones 65 yard pass from Nick Mullens (Parker Shaunfield kick), Southern Miss 28–0. Drive: 5 plays, 85 yards, 1:58
- 9:47 Southern Miss – Allenzae Staggers 75 yard punt return (Parker Shaunfield kick), Southern Miss 35–0. Drive: 2 plays, 1 yard, 1:42
- 4:33 Southern Miss – D.J. Thompson 16 yard pass from Nick Mullens (Parker Shaunfield kick), Southern Miss 42–0. Drive: 7 plays, 68 yards, 2:46
- 0:43 Southern Miss – George Payne 11 yard run (Parker Shaunfield kick), Southern Miss 49–0. Drive: 5 plays, 45 yards, 1:52

Third quarter

- 4:20 Southern Miss – Marquise Ricard 12 yard pass from Parker Adamson (Parker Shaunfield kick), Southern Miss 56–0. Drive: 14 plays, 68 yards, 7:04

Fourth quarter

- No scoring

Leading Passers

- SSU – Blake Dever, 1–7, 17 yards
- USM – Nick Mullens, 16–20, 216 yards, 3 TD, 1 INT

Leading Rushers

- SSU – Keynnard Campbell, 7 carries, 24 yards
- USM – Ito Smith, 8 carries, 128 yards, 1 TD

Leading Receivers

- SSU – Jeremiah Harris Jr., 2 receptions, 23 yards
- USM – Isaiah Jones, 3 receptions, 82 yards, 1 TD

Leading Tacklers

- SSU – Marcus Lee Jr., 10 tackles
- USM – Jeremy Sangster, 5 tackles

=== Troy ===
Week Three: Troy Trojans at Southern Miss Golden Eagles – Game summary

Quarter	1	2	3	4	Total
Trojans	17	7	10	3	37
Golden Eagles	7	10	14	0	31

at M. M. Roberts Stadium, Hattiesburg, MS

- Date: September 17
- Game time: 6:00 p.m. CDT
- Game weather: 78° F • 10 mph • Storming
- Game attendance: 27,905
- Referee: James McArthur
- TV: beIN
- Southern Miss vs Troy

Game information

First quarter

- 11:24 Southern Miss – Devonta Foster 61 yard interception return (Parker Shaunfield kick), Southern Miss 7–0. Drive: 3 plays, 9 yards, 1:09
- 8:47 Troy – Deondre Douglas 34 yard pass from Brandon Silvers (Ryan Kay kick), Tied 7–7. Drive: 7 plays, 74 yards, 2:44
- 8:24 Troy – Emanuel Thompson 29 yard pass from Brandon Silvers (Ryan Kay kick), Troy 14–7. Drive: 2 plays, 29 yards, 0:16
- 5:22 Troy – Ryan Kay 30 yard field goal, Troy 17–7. Drive: 4 plays, -3 yards, 2:16

Second quarter

- 14:47 Southern Miss – Parker Shaunfield 41 yard field goal, Troy 17–10. Drive: 8 plays, 34 yards, 1:57
- 9:09 Troy – Andre Flakes 11 yard pass from Brandon Silvers (Ryan Kay kick), Troy 24–10. Drive: 2 plays, 13 yards, 0:28
- 0:08 Southern Miss – Ito Smith 2 yard run (Parker Shaunfield kick), Troy 24–17. Drive: 7 plays, 78 yards, 1:04

Third quarter

- 14:38 Southern Miss – Ito Smith 70 yard run (Parker Shaunfield kick), Tied 24–24. Drive: 1 play, 70 yards, 0:22
- 10:06 Troy – Ryan Kay 42 yard field goal, Troy 27–24. Drive: 5 plays, 24 yards, 2:11
- 6:12 Troy – Jordan Chunn 39 yard run (Ryan Kay kick), Troy 34–24. Drive: 2 plays, 49 yards, 0:23
- 0:28 Southern Miss – Allenzae Staggers 16 yard pass from Nick Mullens (Parker Shaunfield kick), Troy 34–31. Drive: 7 plays, 48 yards, 1:43

Fourth quarter

- 10:21 Troy – Ryan Kay 43 yard field goal, Troy 37–31. Drive: 4 plays, 0 yards, 1:27

Leading Passers

- TU – Brandon Silvers, 10–27, 123 yards, 3 TD, 1 INT
- USM – Nick Mullens, 24–52, 263 yards, 1 TD, 2 INT

Leading Rushers

- TU – Jordan Chunn, 36 carries, 176 yards, 1 TD
- USM – Ito Smith, 20 carries, 131 yards, 2 TD

Leading Receivers

- TU – Emanuel Thompson, 5 receptions, 53 yards, 1 TD
- USM – Allenzae Staggers, 6 receptions, 98 yards, 1 TD

Leading Tacklers

- TU – Josh Marshall, 7 tackles
- USM – Dylan Bradley, 9 tackles

=== @ UTEP ===
Week Four: Southern Miss Golden Eagles at UTEP Miners – Game summary

Quarter	1	2	3	4	Total
Golden Eagles	3	21	7	3	34
Miners	7	0	0	0	7

at Sun Bowl, El Paso, TX

- Date: September 24
- Game time: 7:00 p.m. CDT
- Game weather: 83° F • WSW 15 • Partly cloudy
- Game attendance: 21,419
- Referee: Rodney Burnette
- TV: CI
- Southern Miss vs UTEP

Game information

First quarter

- 9:20 Southern Miss – Parker Shaunfield 34 yard field goal, Southern Miss 3–0. Drive: 13 plays, 59 yards, 5:40
- 5:37 Texas–El Paso – Aaron Jones 68 yard run (Jay Mattox kick), UTEP 7–3. Drive: 2 plays, 93 yards, 0:42

Second quarter

- 6:39 Southern Miss – D.J. Thompson 6 yard pass from Nick Mullens (Parker Shaunfield kick), Southern Miss 10–7. Drive: 7 plays, 73 yards, 3:05
- 3:57 Southern Miss – Ito Smith 28 yard pass from Nick Mullens (Parker Shaunfield kick), Southern Miss 17–7. Drive: 1 play, 28 yards, 0:09
- 1:30 Southern Miss – Allenzae Staggers 3 yard pass from Nick Mullens (Parker Shaunfield kick), Southern Miss 24–7. Drive: 5 plays, 47 yards, 1:44

Third quarter

- 8:01 Southern Miss – Curtis Mikell 100 yard interception return (Parker Shaunfield kick), Southern Miss 31–7. Drive: 6 plays, 48 yards, 3:25

Fourth quarter

- 12:01 Southern Miss – Parker Shaunfield 46 yard field goal, Southern Miss 34–7. Drive: 4 plays, 4 yards, 0:56

Leading Passers

- USM – Nick Mullens, 16–27, 176 yards, 3 TD, 1 INT
- UTEP – Zach Greenlee, 7–14, 62 yards, 2 INT

Leading Rushers

- USM – Ito Smith, 16 carries, 108 yards
- UTEP – Aaron Jones, 16 carries, 127 yards, 1 TD

Leading Receivers

- USM – D.J. Thompson, 4 receptions, 48 yards, 1 TD
- UTEP – Cole Freytag, 1 reception, 33 yards

Leading Tacklers

- USM – D'Nerius Antoine, 8 tackles
- UTEP – Mike Sota, 9 tackles

=== Rice ===
Week Five: Rice Owls at Southern Miss Golden Eagles – Game summary

Quarter	1	2	3	4	Total
Owls	0	7	7	14	28
Golden Eagles	3	10	21	10	44

at M. M. Roberts Stadium, Hattiesburg, MS

- Date: October 1
- Game time: 6:00 p.m. CDT
- Game weather: 80° F • 5 mph • Clear
- Game attendance: 28,325
- Referee: Stephen Lamantia
- Southern Miss vs Rice

Game information

First quarter

- 3:55 Southern Miss – Parker Shaunfield 22 yard field goal, Southern Miss 3–0. Drive: 11 plays, 78 yards, 3:54

Second quarter

- 9:03 Rice – Samuel Stewart 7 yard pass from Tyler Stehling (Haden Tobola kick), Rice 7–3. Drive: 9 plays, 56 yards, 2:42
- 8:52 Southern Miss – Allenzae Staggers 75 yard pass from Nick Mullens (Parker Shaunfield kick), Southern Miss 10–7. Drive: 1 play, 75 yards, 0:11
- 1:13 Southern Miss – Parker Shaunfield 42 yard field goal, Southern Miss 13–7. Drive: 6 plays, 72 yards, 1:55

Third quarter

- 14:09 Southern Miss – Allenzae Staggers 81 yard pass from Nick Mullens (Parker Shaunfield kick), Southern Miss 20–7. Drive: 3 plays, 74 yards, 0:51
- 10:41 Rice – Samuel Stewart 24 yard run (Haden Tobola kick), Southern Miss 20–14. Drive: 3 plays, 63 yards, 1:01
- 9:46 Southern Miss – Allenzae Staggers 93 yard pass from Nick Mullens (Parker Shaunfield kick), Southern Miss 27–14. 'Drive: 2 plays, 92 yards, 0:55
- 2:31 Southern Miss – Ito Smith 2 yard run (Parker Shaunfield kick), Southern Miss 34–14. Drive: 9 plays, 48 yards, 3:43

Fourth quarter

- 14:52 Rice – Zach Wright 11 yard pass from Tyler Stehling (Haden Tobola kick), Southern Miss 34–21. Drive: 6 plays, 68 yards, 2:39
- 12:37 Southern Miss – D.J. Thompson 9 yard pass from Nick Mullens (Parker Shaunfield kick), Southern Miss 41–21. Drive: 6 plays, 67 yards, 2:15
- 10:59 Rice – Samuel Stewart 17 yard run (Haden Tobola kick), Southern Miss 41–28. Drive: 5 plays, 65 yards, 1:38
- 6:11 Southern Miss – Parker Shaunfield 43 yard field goal, Southern Miss 44–28. Drive: 12 plays, 56 yards, 4:48

Leading Passers

- RU – Tyler Stehling, 14–18, 100 yards, 2 TD
- USM – Nick Mullens, 25–36, 591 yards, 4 TD, 1 INT

Leading Rushers

- RU – Samuel Stewart, 19 carries, 132 yards, 2 TD
- USM – Ito Smith, 19 carries, 77 yards, 1 TD

Leading Receivers

- RU – Temi Alaka, 2 receptions, 66 yards
- USM – Allenzae Staggers, 6 receptions, 292 yards, 3 TD

Leading Tacklers

- RU – Emmanuel Ellerbee, 10 tackles
- USM – D'Nerius Antoine, 11 tackles

=== @ UTSA ===
Week Six: Southern Miss Golden Eagles at UTSA Roadrunners – Game summary

Quarter	1	2	3	4	Total
Golden Eagles	7	14	3	8	32
Roadrunners	28	10	7	10	55

at Alamodome, San Antonio, TX

- Date: October 8
- Game time: 11:00 a.m. CDT
- Game weather: 72° F • Indoors
- Game attendance: 19,818
- Referee: Joe Pester
- TV: ASN
- Southern Miss vs UTSA

Game information

First quarter

- 13:38 Texas–San Antonio – Kerry Thomas Jr. 71 yard pass from Dalton Sturm (Victor Falcon kick), Texas–San Antonio 7–0. Drive: 3 plays, 75 yards, 1:22
- 11:45 Texas–San Antonio – Jarveon Williams 3 yard run (Victor Falcon kick), Texas–San Antonio 14–0. Drive: 2 plays, 80 yards, 0:30
- 7:15 Texas–San Antonio – Jalen Rhodes 4 yard run (Victor Falcon kick), Texas–San Antonio 21–0. Drive: 6 plays, 57 yards, 3:10
- 3:08 Southern Miss – Jay'Shawn Washington 17 yard pass from Nick Mullens (Parker Shaunfield kick), Texas–San Antonio 21–7. Drive: 10 plays, 84 yards, 4:07
- 0:20 Texas–San Antonio – Jarveon Williams 6 yard run (Victor Falcon kick), Texas–San Antonio 28–7. Drive: 5 plays, 82 yards, 2:48

Second quarter

- 11:33 Southern Miss – Ito Smith 1 yard run (Parker Shaunfield kick), Texas–San Antonio 28–14. Drive: 10 plays, 79 yards, 3:47
- 7:26 Texas–San Antonio – Jalen Rhodes 80 yard run (Victor Falcon kick), Texas–San Antonio 35–14. Drive: 1 play, 80 yards, 0:13
- 3:24 Southern Miss – D.J. Thompson 35 yard pass from Nick Mullens (Parker Shaunfield kick), Texas–San Antonio 35–21. Drive: 10 plays, 80 yards, 4:02
- 0:00 Texas–San Antonio – Victor Falcon 45 yard field goal, Texas–San Antonio 38–21. Drive: 6 plays, 34 yards, 3:24

Third quarter

- 9:10 Southern Miss – Parker Shaunfield 28 yard field goal, Texas–San Antonio 38–24. Drive: 13 plays, 75 yards, 5:50
- 6:23 Texas–San Antonio – Matt Guidry 20 yard run (Victor Falcon kick), Texas–San Antonio 45–24. Drive: 6 plays, 57 yards, 2:47

Fourth quarter

- 10:50 Texas–San Antonio – Victor Falcon 26 yard field goal, Texas–San Antonio 48–24. Drive: 4 plays, 5 yards, 1:40
- 6:47 Southern Miss – Chase Whitehead 33 yard pass from Nick Mullens (Nick Mullens pass to Julian Allen for two-point conv.), Texas–San Antonio 48–32. Drive: 13 plays, 86 yards, 4:03
- 1:57 Texas–San Antonio – Jalen Rhodes 3 yard run (Victor Falcon kick), Texas–San Antonio 55–32. Drive: 4 plays, 85 yards, 1:18

Leading Passers

- USM – Nick Mullens, 24–47, 370 yards, 3 TD, 1 INT
- UTSA – Dalton Storm, 10–12, 193 yards, 1 TD

Leading Rushers

- USM – Ito Smith, 20 carries, 94 yards, 1 TD
- UTSA – Jalen Rhodes, 14 carries, 165 yards, 3 TD

Leading Receivers

- USM – Allenzae Staggers, 6 receptions, 92 yards
- UTSA – Josh Stewart, 2 receptions, 85 yards

Leading Tacklers

- USM – Dylan Bradley, 6 tackles
- UTSA – Josiah Tauaefa, 12 tackles

=== @ LSU ===
Week Seven: Southern Miss Golden Eagles at LSU Tigers – Game summary

Quarter	1	2	3	4	Total
Golden Eagles	7	3	0	0	10
Tigers	7	3	28	7	45

at Tiger Stadium, Baton Rouge, LA

- Date: October 15
- Game time: 6:30 p.m. CDT
- Game weather: 81° F • ESE 8 • Partly cloudy
- Game attendance: 102,164
- Referee: James Carter
- TV: SECN
- Southern Miss vs LSU

Game information

First quarter

- 6:58 Southern Miss – Ito Smith 1 yard run (Parker Shaunfield kick), Southern Miss 7–0. Drive: 15 plays, 75 yards, 8:02
- 2:22 LSU – D.J. Chark 19 yard run (Colby Delahoussaye kick), Tied 7–7. Drive: 3 plays, 55 yards, 1:05

Second quarter

- 14:05 LSU – Colby Delahoussaye 38 yard field goal, LSU 10–7. Drive: 5 plays, 36 yards, 1:38
- 8:28 Southern Miss – Parker Shaunfield 37 yard field goal, Tied 10–10. Drive: 11 plays, 62 yards, 5:29

Third quarter

- 13:22 LSU – Derrius Guice 61 yard run (Colby Delahoussaye kick), LSU 17–10. Drive: 3 plays, 70 yards, 1:32
- 10:50 LSU – Derrius Guice 20 yard run (Colby Delahoussaye kick), LSU 24–10. Drive: 2 plays, 22 yards, 0:54
- 4:20 LSU – D.J. Chark 80 yard pass from Danny Etling (Colby Delahoussaye kick), LSU 31–10. Drive: 1 play, 80 yards, 0:14
- 1:58 LSU – Malachi Dupre 63 yard pass from Danny Etling (Colby Delahoussaye kick), LSU 38–10. Drive: 1 play, 63 yards, 0:10

Fourth quarter

- 5:16 LSU – Malachi Dupre 23 yard pass from Danny Etling (Jack Gonsoulin kick), LSU 45–10. Drive: 7 plays, 87 yards, 4:20

Leading Passers

- USM – Nick Mullens, 25–36, 161 yards
- LSU – Danny Etling, 11–18, 276 yards, 3 TD, 1 INT

Leading Rushers

- USM – Ito Smith, 16 carries, 64 yards, 1 TD
- LSU – Derrius Guice, 16 carries, 162 yards, 2 TD

Leading Receivers

- USM – Ito Smith, 6 receptions, 46 yards
- LSU – Malachi Dupre, 3 receptions, 100 yards, 2 TD

Leading Tacklers

- USM – Elijah Parker, 7 tackles
- LSU – Kendell Beckwith, 15 tackles

=== Marshall ===
Week Nine: Marshall Thundering Herd at Southern Miss Golden Eagles – Game summary

Quarter	1	2	3	4	Total
Thundering Herd	0	7	0	7	14
Golden Eagles	7	3	0	14	24

at M. M. Roberts Stadium, Hattiesburg, MS

- Date: October 29
- Game time: 6:00 p.m. CDT
- Game weather: 83° F • S 3 • Clear, humidity 36%
- Game attendance: 31,275
- Referee: Dan Gautreaux
- TV: ASN
- Southern Miss vs Marshall

Game information

First quarter

- 9:29 Southern Miss – Ito Smith 1 yard run (Parker Shaunfield kick), Southern Miss 7–0. Drive: 15 plays, 75 yards, 5:31

Second quarter

- 14:07 Southern Miss – Parker Shaunfield 44 yard field goal, Southern Miss 10–0. Drive: 6 plays, 56 yards, 1:32
- 6:47 Marshall – Keion Davis 5 yard run (Amoreto Curraj kick), Southern Miss 10–7. Drive: 8 plays, 89 yards, 3:12

Third quarter

- No Scoring

Fourth quarter

- 12:08 Southern Miss – Allenzae Staggers 4 yard pass from Nick Mullens (Parker Shaunfield kick), Southern Miss 17–7. Drive: 10 plays, 83 yards, 2:58
- 4:23 Southern Miss – Ito Smith 40 yard run (Parker Shaunfield kick), Southern Miss 24–7. Drive: 4 plays, 64 yards, 1:30
- 2:26 Marshall – Michael Clark 44 yard pass from Chase Litton (Amoreto Curraj kick), Southern Miss 24–14. Drive: 4 plays, 53 yards, 1:47

Leading Passers

- MU – Chase Litton, 20–34, 166 yards, 1 TD
- USM – Nick Mullens, 22–40, 300 yards, 1 TD

Leading Rushers

- MU – Keion Davis, 11 carries, 52 yards, 1 TD
- USM – Ito Smith, 20 carries, 140 yards, 2 TD

Leading Receivers

- MU – Josh Knight, 6 receptions, 47 yards
- USM – Allenzae Staggers, 7 receptions, 99 yards, 1 TD

Leading Tacklers

- MU – Frankie Hernandez, 8 tackles
- USM – Cornell Armstrong, 8 tackles

=== Charlotte ===
Week Ten: Charlotte 49ers at Southern Miss Golden Eagles – Game summary

Quarter	1	2	3	4	Total
49ers	7	21	10	0	38
Golden Eagles	14	0	0	13	27

at M. M. Roberts Stadium, Hattiesburg, MS

- Date: November 5
- Game time: 2:30 p.m. CDT
- Game weather: 77° F • 3 mph • Clear
- Game attendance: 28,347
- Referee: Jay Edwards
- TV: ASN
- Southern Miss vs Charlotte

Game information

First quarter

- 10:33 Charlotte – Hasaan Klugh 7 yard run (Blake Brewer kick), Charlotte 7–0. Drive: 3 plays, 80 yards, 1:20
- 5:45 Southern Miss – Korey Robertson 3 yard pass from Nick Mullens (Parker Shaunfield kick), Tied 7–7. Drive: 3 plays, 35 yards, 1:15
- 0:35 Southern Miss – Chase Whitehead 78 yard pass from Nick Mullens (Parker Shaunfield kick), Southern Miss 14–7. Drive: 2 plays, 78 yards, 0:19

Second quarter

- 13:29 Charlotte – Robert Washington 58 yard run (Blake Brewer kick), Tied 14–14. Drive: 6 plays, 75 yards, 2:06
- 1:46 Charlotte – Chris Montgomery 9 yard run (Blake Brewer kick), Charlotte 21–14. Drive: 12 plays, 99 yards, 4:32
- 0:35 Charlotte – T.L. Ford II 18 yard pass from Hasaan Klugh (Blake Brewer kick), Charlotte 28–14. Drive: 1 play, 18 yards, 0:06

Third quarter

- 9:29 Charlotte – Blake Brewer 22 yard field goal, Charlotte 31–14. Drive: 15 plays, 68 yards, 5:31
- 3:18 Charlotte – Ed Rolle 0 yard blocked punt return (Blake Brewer kick), Charlotte 38–14. Drive: 3 plays, -1 yard, 1:39

Fourth quarter

- 14:11 Southern Miss – Ito Smith 8 yard run (Parker Adamson two-point pass conv. failed), Charlotte 38–20. Drive: 11 plays, 90 yards, 4:07
- 4:56 Southern Miss – Parker Adamson 2 yard run (Parker Shaunfield kick), Charlotte 38–27. Drive: 19 plays, 99 yards, 4:52

Leading Passers

- UNCC – Hasaan Klugh, 11–24, 127 yards, 1 TD
- USM – Nick Mullens, 19–25, 249 yards, 2 TD, 2 INT

Leading Rushers

- UNCC – Kalif Phillips, 29 carries, 183 yards
- USM – Ito Smith, 15 carries, 69 yards, 1 TD

Leading Receivers

- UNCC – Workpeh Kofa, 2 receptions, 57 yards
- USM – Chase Whitehead, 2 receptions, 84 yards, 1 TD

Leading Tacklers

- UNCC – Nick Cook, 10 tackles
- USM – D'Nerius Antoine, 12 tackles

=== @ Old Dominion ===
Week Eleven: Southern Miss Golden Eagles at Old Dominion Monarchs – Game summary

Quarter	1	2	3	4	Total
Golden Eagles	0	7	14	14	35
Monarchs	21	14	7	9	51

at Foreman Field, Norfolk, VA

- Date: November 12
- Game time: 2:30 p.m. CST
- Game weather: 48° F • NNE 6 • Sunny
- Game attendance: 20,118
- Referee: Ken Antee
- TV: ASN
- Southern Miss vs Old Dominion

Game information

First quarter

- 11:02 Old Dominion – Ray Lawry 2 yard run (Brad Davis kick), Old Dominion 7–0. Drive: 3 plays, 5 yards, 0:47
- 9:45 Old Dominion – Ray Lawry 2 yard run (Brad Davis kick), Old Dominion 14–0. Drive: 3 plays, 28 yards, 1:04
- 3:58 Old Dominion – Jeremy Cox 3 yard run (Brad Davis kick), Old Dominion 21–0. Drive: 3 plays, 43 yards, 1:02

Second quarter

- 10:05 Southern Miss – Keon Howard 2 yard run (Stephen Brauchle kick), Old Dominion 21–7. Drive: 8 plays, 64 yards, 3:54
- 6:55 Old Dominion – Jonathan Duhart 5 yard pass from David Washington (Brad Davis kick), Old Dominion 28–7. Drive: 6 plays, 62 yards, 3:04
- 1:19 Old Dominion – Travis Fulgham 39 yard pass from David Washington (Brad Davis kick), Old Dominion 35–7. Drive: 4 plays, 92 yards, 2:05

Third quarter

- 11:29 Old Dominion – Jeremy Cox 67 yard run (Brad Davis kick), Old Dominion 42–7. Drive: 3 plays, 69 yards, 0:53
- 6:54 Southern Miss – Ito Smith 1 yard run (Stephen Brauchle kick), Old Dominion 42–14. Drive: 11 plays, 73 yards, 4:30
- 0:07 Southern Miss – Ito Smith 2 yard run (Stephen Brauchle kick), Old Dominion 42–21. Drive: 12 plays, 82 yards, 4:34

Fourth quarter

- 9:55 Southern Miss – Ito Smith 1 yard run (Stephen Brauchle kick), Old Dominion 42–28. Drive: 8 plays, 93 yards, 2:36
- 7:44 Old Dominion – Safety, Old Dominion 44–28. Drive: 3 plays, -15 yards, 0:55
- 4:13 Old Dominion – Rashaad Coward 7 yard fumble return (Brad Davis kick), Old Dominion 51–28. Drive: 3 plays, -29 yards, 1:27
- 3:53 Southern Miss – Marquise Ricard 55 yard pass from Keon Howard (Stephen Brauchle kick), Old Dominion 51–35. Drive: 1 play, 55 yards, 0:13

Leading Passers

- USM – Keon Howard, 12–24, 230 yards, 1 TD, 1 INT
- ODU – David Washington, 12–18, 144 yards, 2 TD

Leading Rushers

- USM – Keon Howard, 28 carries, 98 yards, 1 TD
- ODU – Jeremy Cox, 4 carries, 77 yards, 2 TD

Leading Receivers

- USM – Marquise Ricard, 3 receptions, 84 yards, 1 TD
- ODU – Jonathan Duhart, 5 receptions, 52 yards, 1 TD

Leading Tacklers

- USM – D'Nerius Antoine, 7 tackles
- ODU – Anthony Wilson, 17 tackles

=== @ North Texas ===
Week Twelve: Southern Miss Golden Eagles at North Texas Mean Green – Game summary

Quarter	1	2	3	4	Total
Golden Eagles	7	0	13	3	23
Mean Green	17	0	3	9	29

at Apogee Stadium, Denton, TX

- Date: November 19
- Game time: 4:30 p.m. CST
- Game weather: 56° F • N 7 • Sunny
- Game attendance: 19,120
- Referee: Dan Gautreaux
- TV: beIN
- Southern Miss vs North Texas

Game information

First quarter

- 8:12 North Texas – Trevor Moore 26 yard field goal, North Texas 3–0. Drive: 7 plays, 65 yards, 2:11
- 3:16 North Texas – Turner Smiley 17 yard pass from Alec Morris (Trevor Moore kick), North Texas 10–0. Drive: 7 plays, 60 yards, 3:07
- 1:22 North Texas – Turner Smiley 55 yard pass from Alec Morris (Trevor Moore kick), North Texas 17–0. Drive: 1 play, 55 yards, 0:10

Second quarter

- 10:42 North Texas – Trevor Moore 39 yard field goal, North Texas 20–0. Drive: 8 plays, 73 yards, 2:52
- 0:25 Southern Miss – Ito Smith 1 yard run (Stephen Brauchle kick), North Texas 20–7. Drive: 3 plays, 53 yards, 0:57

Third quarter

- 13:44 Southern Miss – Ito Smith 2 yard run (Stephen Brauchle kick failed), North Texas 20–13. Drive: 3 plays, 75 yards, 1:16
- 9:07 Southern Miss – George Payne 16 yard run (Stephen Brauchle kick), Tied 20–20. Drive: 8 plays, 66 yards, 3:03

Fourth quarter

- 9:39 Southern Miss – Stephen Brauchle 25 yard field goal, Southern Miss 23–20. Drive: 5 plays, 4 yards, 1:25
- 7:34 North Texas – Willy Ivery 11 yard run (Trevor Moore kick), North Texas 27–23. Drive: 6 plays, 65 yards, 2:05
- 3:08 North Texas – Safety, North Texas 29–23. Drive: 4 plays, -4 yards, 0:43

Leading Passers

- USM – Keon Howard, 10–26, 135 yards, 3 INT
- UNT – Alec Morris, 14–29, 267 yards, 2 TD, 1 INT

Leading Rushers

- USM – Ito Smith, 19 carries, 113 yards, 2 TD
- UNT – Willy Ivery, 18 carries, 111 yards, 1 TD

Leading Receivers

- USM – Ito Smith, 3 receptions, 67 yards
- UNT – Turner Smiley, 7 receptions, 162 yards, 2 TD

Leading Tacklers

- USM – D'Nerius Antoine, 9 tackles
- UNT – Kishawn McClain, 8 tackles

=== Louisiana Tech ===
Week Thirteen: Louisiana Tech Bulldogs at Southern Miss Golden Eagles – Game summary

Quarter	1	2	3	4	Total
Bulldogs	7	10	0	7	24
Golden Eagles	10	13	6	10	39

at M. M. Roberts Stadium, Hattiesburg, MS

- Date: November 26
- Game time: 3:00 p.m. CST
- Game weather: 73° F • N 4 • Sunny
- Game attendance: 26,164
- Referee: Rodney Burnette
- TV: ESPNews
- Southern Miss vs Louisiana Tech

Game information

First quarter

- 10:41 Southern Miss – Keon Howard 9 yard run (Stephen Brauchle kick), Southern Miss 7–0. Drive: 10 plays, 75 yards, 4:19
- 6:08 Louisiana Tech – Jarred Craft 5 yard run (Jonathan Barnes kick), Tied 7–7. Drive: 9 plays, 67 yards, 4:33
- 1:28 Southern Miss – Stephen Brauchle 22 yard field goal, Southern Miss 10–7. Drive: 10 plays, 42 yards, 4:40

Second quarter

- 14:12 Louisiana Tech – Xavier Woods 30 yard fumble return (Jonathan Barnes kick), Louisiana Tech 14–10. Drive: 3 plays, -5 yards, 1:07
- 9:40 Southern Miss – D.J. Thompson 21 yard pass from Nick Mullens (Stephen Brauchle kick), Southern Miss 17–14. Drive: 8 plays, 91 yards, 4:32
- 3:14 Southern Miss – D.J. Thompson 8 yard pass from Nick Mullens (Stephen Brauchle kick blocked), Southern Miss 23–14. Drive: 6 plays, 89 yards, 3:12
- 0:36 Louisiana Tech – Jonathan Barnes 31 yard field goal, Southern Miss 23–17. Drive: 8 plays, 56 yards, 2:38

Third quarter

- 1:19 Southern Miss – Korey Robertson 6 yard pass from Nick Mullens (two-point pass conv. failed), Southern Miss 29–17. Drive: 11 plays, 89 yards, 5:58

Fourth quarter

- 7:48 Southern Miss – Stephen Brauchle 25 yard field goal, Southern Miss 32–17. Drive: 5 plays, 28 yards, 2:48
- 2:19 Southern Miss – Nick Mullens 1 yard run (Stephen Brauchle kick), Southern Miss 39–17. Drive: 4 plays, 1 yard, 1:11
- 0:57 Louisiana Tech – Jarred Craft 2 yard run (Jonathan Barnes kick), Southern Miss 39–24. Drive: 5 plays, 45 yards, 1:22

Leading Passers

- LTU – Ryan Higgins, 22–39, 246 yards, 3 INT
- USM – Nick Mullens, 29–33, 342 yards, 3 TD

Leading Rushers

- LTU – Jared Craft, 9 carries, 17 yards, 2 TD
- USM – Ito Smith, 24 carries, 127 yards

Leading Receivers

- LTU – Trent Taylor, 10 receptions, 119 yards
- USM – D.J. Thompson, 12 receptions, 135 yards, 2 TD

Leading Tacklers

- LTU – Xavier Woods, 12 tackles
- USM – Picasso Nelson Jr., 9 tackles

=== Louisiana–Lafayette (New Orleans Bowl) ===
New Orleans Bowl: Southern Miss vs. Louisiana–Lafayette – Game summary

Quarter	1	2	3	4	Total
Golden Eagles	14	0	7	7	28
Ragin' Cajuns	7	7	0	7	21

at Mercedes-Benz Superdome, New Orleans, LA

- Date: December 17
- Game time: 8:00 p.m. CST
- Game weather: 74° F • S 12 • Indoors
- Game attendance: 35,061
- Referee: Tom Stapleton
- TV: ESPN
- Southern Miss vs Louisiana–Lafayette (New Orleans Bowl)

Game information

First quarter

- 9:39 Southern Miss – Ito Smith 11 yard run (Parker Shaunfield kick), Southern Miss 7–0. Drive: 3 plays, 67 yards, 0:57
- 7:17 Southern Miss – Ito Smith 6 yard pass from Nick Mullens (Parker Shaunfield kick), Southern Miss 14–0. Drive: 3 plays, 70 yards, 1:12
- 3:15 Louisiana–Lafayette – Anthony Jennings 4 yard run (Stevie Artigue kick), Southern Miss 14–7. Drive: 9 plays, 66 yards, 3:55

Second quarter

- 7:28 Louisiana–Lafayette – Dion Ray 12 yard run (Stevie Artigue kick), Tied 14–14. Drive: 2 plays, 29 yards, 0:30

Third quarter

- 10:42 Southern Miss – Allenzae Staggers 5 yard pass from Nick Mullens (Parker Shaunfield kick), Southern Miss 21–14. Drive: 11 plays, 75 yards, 4:18

Fourth quarter

- 12:26 Southern Miss – Ito Smith 1 yard run (Parker Shaunfield kick), Southern Miss 28–14. Drive: 14 plays, 83 yards, 6:14
- 5:10 Louisiana–Lafayette –Anthony Jennings 3 yard run (Stevie Artigue kick), Southern Miss 28–21. Drive: 5 plays, 19 yards, 2:10

Leading Passers

- USM – Nick Mullens, 25–40, 346 yards, 2 TD, 1 INT
- ULL – Anthony Jennings, 8–20, 95 yards, 1 INT

Leading Rushers

- USM – Ito Smith, 26 carries, 138 yards, 2 TD
- ULL – Elijah McGuire, 17 carries, 99 yards

Leading Receivers

- USM – Allenzae Staggers, 11 receptions, 230 yards, 1 TD
- ULL – Al Riles, 5 receptions, 64 yards

Leading Tacklers

- USM – Jaboorie Poole, 9 tackles
- ULL – Christian Goodlet, 7 tackles

== Team players drafted in the NFL ==
Player	Position	Round	Pick	NFL club
Mike Thomas	Wide receiver	6	31	Los Angeles Rams
Kalan Reed	Defensive back	7	32	Tennessee Titans
