= Troy Trojans football statistical leaders =

The Troy Trojans football statistical leaders are individual statistical leaders of the Troy Trojans football program in various categories, including passing, rushing, receiving, total offense, defensive stats, and kicking. Within those areas, the lists identify single-game, single-season, and career leaders. The Trojans represent Troy University in the NCAA Division I FBS Sun Belt Conference (SBC).

Although Troy began competing in intercollegiate football in 1909, the school's official record book considers the "modern era" to have begun in 1966. Records from before this year are often incomplete and inconsistent, and they are generally not included in these lists.

These lists are dominated by more recent players for several reasons:

- Since the 1960s, seasons have increased from 10 games to 11 and then 12 games in length.
- The NCAA didn't allow freshmen to play varsity football until 1972 (with the exception of the World War II years), allowing players to have four-year careers.
- Bowl games only began counting toward single-season and career statistics in 2002. The Trojans have played in nine bowl games since this decision, and will play a 10th in 2023, giving many recent players an extra game to accumulate statistics.
- The SBC has held a championship game since 2018. Troy played in the 2022 and 2023 editions, giving players in those seasons yet another game to accumulate statistics.
- Due to COVID-19 issues, the NCAA ruled that the 2020 season would not count against the athletic eligibility of any football player, giving everyone who played in that season the opportunity for five years of eligibility instead of the normal four.

These lists are updated through the 2025 season.

== Passing ==
=== Passing yards ===
Career
Rk	Player	Yards	Years
1	Corey Robinson	13,477	2010 2011 2012 2013
2	Brandon Silvers	10,684	2014 2015 2016 2017
3	Gunnar Watson	10,275	2018 2019 2020 2021 2022 2023
4	Brock Nutter	7,687	1997 1998 1999 2000 2001
5	Sim Byrd	7,619	1966 1967 1968
6	Levi Brown	6,284	2008 2009
7	Omar Haugabook	5,376	2006 2007
8	Kaleb Barker	4,793	2016 2017 2018 2019
9	Mike Turk	4,174	1984 1985 1986 1987
10	Kelvin Simmons	4,000	1992 1993

Single season
Rk	Player	Yards	Year
1	Levi Brown	4,254	2009
2	Corey Robinson	3,726	2010
3	Kaleb Barker	3,628	2019
4	Sim Byrd	3,569	1968
	Gunnar Watson	3,569	2023
6	Corey Robinson	3,411	2011
7	Brandon Silvers	3,290	2017
8	Brandon Silvers	3,180	2016
9	Corey Robinson	3,121	2012
10	Omar Haugabook	2,975	2007

Single game
Rk	Player	Yards	Year	Opponent
1	Kaleb Barker	504	2019	Southern Miss
2	Corey Robinson	485	2012	Louisiana-Lafayette
3	Levi Brown	477	2009	Florida Atlantic
4	Levi Brown	469	2009	North Texas
5	Sim Byrd	443	1968	Samford
6	Kaleb Barker	421	2019	Georgia State
7	Jacob Free	419	2020	Arkansas State
8	Corey Robinson	417	2012	Arkansas State
9	Tucker Kilcrease	415	2025	Texas State
10	Levi Brown	413	2009	UAB

=== Passing touchdowns ===
Career
Rk	Player	TDs	Years
1	Corey Robinson	81	2010 2011 2012 2013
2	Sim Byrd	79	1966 1967 1968
3	Brandon Silvers	71	2014 2015 2016 2017
4	Gunnar Watson	65	2018 2019 2020 2021 2022 2023
5	Brock Nutter	49	1997 1998 1999 2000 2001
6	Kaleb Barker	41	2016 2017 2018 2019
7	Kelvin Simmons	40	1992 1993
8	Omar Haugabook	39	2006 2007
9	Levi Brown	38	2008 2009
10	Mike Turk	30	1984 1985 1986 1987

Single season
Rk	Player	TDs	Year
1	Sim Byrd	41	1968
2	Kelvin Simmons	31	1993
3	Kaleb Barker	30	2019
4	Corey Robinson	28	2010
5	Gunnar Watson	27	2023
6	Levi Brown	23	2009
	Brandon Silvers	23	2016
8	Sim Byrd	22	1967
9	Omar Haugabook	21	2006
	Corey Robinson	21	2011
	Brandon Silvers	20	2015

Single game
Rk	Player	TDs	Year	Opponent
1	Sim Byrd	6	1968	Concord
	Sim Byrd	6	1968	Willamette
	Kaleb Barker	6	2019	Texas State
4	Sim Byrd	5	1968	Texas A&M-International
	Sim Byrd	5	1968	Samford
	Sim Byrd	5	1968	McNeese State
	Kelvin Simmons	5	1993	Alabama State
	Brandon Silvers	5	2015	New Mexico State
	Tucker Kilcrease	5	2025	Texas State

== Rushing ==
=== Rushing yards ===
Career
Rk	Player	Yards	Years
1	Kimani Vidal	4,010	2020 2021 2022 2023
2	DeWhitt Betterson	3,441	2001 2002 2003 2004
3	Ted Horstead	2,926	1983 1984 1985 1986
4	Shawn Southward	2,793	2009 2010 2011 2012
5	DuJuan Harris	2,636	2007 2008 2009 2010
6	Mike Turk	2,533	1984 1985 1986 1987
7	Joe Jackson	2,418	1994 1995 1996 1997
8	Arrid Gregory	2,417	1993 1994 1995 1996
9	Eddie Coleman	2,360	1990 1991 1992
10	Jordan Chunn	2,346	2013 2014 2015 2016

Single season
Rk	Player	Yards	Year
1	Kimani Vidal	1,661	2023
2	Arrid Gregory	1,337	1996
3	Jordan Chunn	1,288	2016
4	DeWhitt Betterson	1,286	2004
5	B. J. Smith	1,186	2018
6	DeWhitt Betterson	1,161	2003
7	Kimani Vidal	1,131	2022
8	DuJuan Harris	1,128	2008
9	Ted Horstead	1,123	1984
10	Eddie Coleman	1,044	1992

Single game
Rk	Player	Yards	Year	Opponent
1	Kimani Vidal	248	2023	Stephen F. Austin
2	Kimani Vidal	245	2023	Arkansas State
3	Eddie Brundidge	244	1984	Valdosta State
4	Kimani Vidal	242	2022	Louisiana–Monroe
5	Kimani Vidal	233	2023	Appalachian State (Sun Belt Championship Game)
6	DuJuan Harris	232	2008	Louisiana–Lafayette
7	DeWhitt Betterson	230	2003	Utah State
8	Eddie Brundidge	226	1986	Jacksonville State
9	Kenny Cattouse	208	2007	FIU
	Kimani Vidal	208	2022	Arkansas State

=== Rushing touchdowns ===
Career
Rk	Player	TDs	Years
1	Jordan Chunn	46	2013 2014 2015 2016
2	Joe Jackson	34	1994 1995 1996 1997
3	Shawn Southward	33	2009 2010 2011 2012
	Kimani Vidal	33	2020 2021 2022 2023
5	Mike Turk	32	1984 1985 1986 1987
6	DuJuan Harris	27	2007 2008 2009 2010
7	DeWhitt Betterson	24	2001 2002 2003 2004
8	B. J. Smith	23	2016 2017 2018 2019 2020 2021
9	Arrid Gregory	21	1993 1994 1995 1996
10	Jeremy Rowell	20	1991 1993 1994 1995

Single season
Rk	Player	TDs	Year
1	Joe Jackson	17	1986
2	Jordan Chunn	16	2016
3	Jeremy Rowell	15	1994
4	Jimmy Godwin	14	1993
	Jordan Chunn	14	2013
	Kimani Vidal	14	2023
7	Joe Jackson	13	1995
	B. J. Smith	13	2018
9	Shawn Southward	12	2009
10	Omar Haugabook	11	2007
	DuJuan Harris	11	2008

Single game
Rk	Player	TDs	Year	Opponent
1	Kimani Vidal	5	2023	Appalachian State (Sun Belt Championship Game)
2	Phillip Jones	4	1997	Jacksonville State
	Shawn Southward	4	2009	Western Kentucky
	Kimani Vidal	4	2022	Arkansas State

== Receiving ==
=== Receptions ===
Career
Rk	Player	Rec	Years
1	Jerrel Jernigan	262	2007 2008 2009 2010
2	Danny Grant	215	1966 1967 1968 1969
3	Eric Thomas	197	2010 2011 2012 2013
4	Jason Samples	161	2001 2002 2003 2004
5	Vince Green	160	1967 1968 1969 1970
6	Gary Banks	155	2004 2005 2006 2007
7	Kaylon Geiger	141	2019 2020
	Tez Johnson	141	2020 2021 2022
9	Chandler Worthy	137	2011 2012 2013 2014
10	Jabre Barber	132	2021 2022 2023

Single season
Rk	Player	Rec	Year
1	Jerrel Jernigan	84	2010
2	Emanuel Thompson	80	2016
3	Jerrel Jernigan	77	2008
	Kaylon Geiger	77	2019
5	Devonte Ross	76	2024
6	Jabre Barber	75	2023
7	Danny Grant	72	1968
8	Jerrel Jernigan	71	2009
9	Gary Banks	68	2006
10	Eric Thomas	67	2011
	Tez Johnson	67	2021

Single game
Rk	Player	Rec	Year	Opponent
1	Danny Grant	16	1968	McNeese State
2	Doug Taylor	13	1970	Southeastern Louisiana
	Vince Green	13	1970	North Alabama
	Jerrel Jernigan	13	2009	Louisiana-Monroe
5	Kaylon Geiger	12	2019	Coastal Carolina
6	Jerrel Jernigan	11	2007	Georgia
	Eric Thomas	11	2011	Arkansas State
	Deondre Douglas	11	2016	Clemson
	Devonte Ross	11	2024	Florida A&M
	Devonte Ross	11	2024	Arkansas State

=== Receiving yards ===
Career
Rk	Player	Yards	Years
1	Jerrel Jernigan	3,128	2007 2008 2009 2010
2	Danny Grant	2,907	1966 1967 1968 1969
3	Eric Thomas	2,655	2010 2011 2012 2013
4	Vince Green	2,281	1967 1968 1969 1970
5	Jason Samples	2,224	2001 2002 2003 2004
6	Kelvin Murdock	2,143	1978 1979 1980 1981
7	Perry Griggs	1,975	1973 1974 1975 1976
8	Chip Reeves	1,968	2008 2009 2010 2012
9	Tez Johnson	1,809	2020 2021 2022
10	Heyward Skipper	1,800	2000 2001 2002

Single season
Rk	Player	Yards	Year
1	Rufus Cox	1,169	1984
2	Jerrel Jernigan	1,101	2009
3	Chip Reeves	1,050	2012
4	Devonte Ross	1,043	2024
5	Vince Green	1,030	1970
6	Danny Grant	1,002	1968
7	Jabre Barber	999	2023
8	Heyward Skipper	995	2001
9	Eric Thomas	993	2013
10	Orlando Parker	983	1993

Single game
Rk	Player	Yards	Year	Opponent
1	Devonte Ross	229	2024	Florida A&M
2	Danny Grant	225	1968	McNeese State
3	Rufus Cox	212	1984	Central State
4	Jerrel Jernigan	209	2010	Arkansas State
5	Doug Taylor	204	1970	Southeastern Louisiana
6	Perry Griggs	196	1974	North Alabama
7	Vince Green	193	1970	North Alabama
8	Kelvin Murdock	172	1980	Jacksonville State
9	Heyward Skipper	169	2001	Louisiana-Monroe
10	Orlando Parker	168	1993	McNeese State

=== Receiving touchdowns ===
Career
Rk	Player	TDs	Years
1	Danny Grant	44	1966 1967 1968 1969
2	Eric Thomas	29	2010 2011 2012 2013
3	Vince Green	27	1967 1968 1969 1970
4	Perry Griggs	19	1973 1974 1975 1976
5	Jerrel Jernigan	18	2007 2008 2009 2010
6	Bobby Enslen	16	1967 1968
7	Kelvin Murdock	15	1978 1979 1980 1981
	Robert Kilow	15	1991 1992 1993 1994
	Bryan Holmes	15	2012 2013 2014 2015

Single season
Rk	Player	TDs	Year
1	Danny Grant	14	1966
	Danny Grant	14	1968
3	Bobby Enslen	12	1968
	Robert Kilow	12	1993
	Eric Thomas	12	2013
6	Devonte Ross	11	2024
7	Danny Grant	10	1967
	Vince Green	10	1970
	Chris Lewis	10	2023

Single game
Rk	Player	TDs	Year	Opponent
1	Danny Grant	5	1968	McNeese State

== Total offense ==
Total offense is the sum of passing and rushing statistics. It does not include receiving or returns.

=== Total offense yards ===
Career
Rk	Player	Yards	Years
1	Corey Robinson	13,141	2010 2011 2012 2013
2	Gunnar Watson	9,848	2018 2019 2020 2021 2022 2023
3	Brandon Silvers	7,522	2014 2015 2016
4	Sim Byrd	7,373	1966 1967 1968
5	Brock Nutter	7,332	1997 1998 1999 2000 2001
6	Mike Turk	6,707	1984 1985 1986 1987
7	Levi Brown	6,308	2008 2009
8	Omar Haugabook	6,306	2006 2007
9	Kaleb Barker	5,473	2016 2017 2018 2019
10	Kelvin Simmons	5,020	1992 1993

Single season
Rk	Player	Yards	Year
1	Levi Brown	4,261	2009
2	Kaleb Barker	3,765	2019
3	Corey Robinson	3,626	2010
4	Omar Haugabook	3,592	2007
5	Gunnar Watson	3,463	2023
6	Sim Byrd	3,443	1968
7	Corey Robinson	3,333	2011
8	Brandon Silvers	3,308	2016
9	Kelvin Simmons	3,250	1993
10	Corey Robinson	3,108	2013

Single game
Rk	Player	Yards	Year	Opponent
1	Sim Byrd	545	1968	Samford
2	Kaleb Barker	485	2019	Southern Miss
3	Levi Brown	476	2009	North Texas
	Corey Robinson	476	2012	Louisiana–Lafayette
5	Omar Haugabook	420	2007	Oklahoma State
6	Kaleb Barker	416	2019	Georgia State
7	Brandon Silvers	413	2016	South Alabama
8	Tucker Kilcrease	411	2025	Texas State
9	Corey Robinson	406	2011	Arkansas
10	Levi Brown	405	2008	North Texas

=== Touchdowns responsible for ===
"Touchdowns responsible for" is the NCAA's official term for combined passing and rushing touchdowns.

Career
Rk	Player	TDs	Years
1	Corey Robinson	84	2010 2011 2012 2013
2	Sim Byrd	80	1966 1967 1968
3	Gunnar Watson	69	2018 2019 2020 2021 2022 2023
4	Brandon Silvers	65	2014 2015 2016
5	Mike Turk	62	1984 1985 1986 1987
6	Brock Nutter	56	1997 1998 1999 2000 2001
7	Omar Haugabook	55	2006 2007
8	Kelvin Simmons	53	1992 1993
9	Kaleb Barker	49	2016 2017 2018 2019
10	Jeremy Rowell	42	1991 1993 1994 1995

Single season
Rk	Player	TDs	Year
1	Sim Byrd	41	1968
2	Kelvin Simmons	37	1993
3	Kaleb Barker	32	2019
4	Omar Haugabook	30	2007
5	Corey Robinson	28	2010
	Gunnar Watson	28	2023
7	Brandon Silvers	27	2016
8	Omar Haugabook	26	2006
9	Jeremy Rowell	24	1994
	Levi Brown	24	2009

== Defense ==
=== Interceptions ===
Career
Rk	Player	Ints	Years
1	Ronnie Shelley	36	1966 1967 1968 1969
2	Derrick Ansley	19	2000 2001 2002 2003 2004
3	David Cooper	16	1967 1968 1969
	Tyrone Ferguson	16	1974 1976 1977
	Donnie Arnold	16	1980 1981 1982 1983
6	Mike Haynes	14	1982 1983 1984 1985
7	Jack Smith	13	1969 1970
	Doug Mims	13	1987 1988 1989

Single season
Rk	Player	Ints	Year
1	Ronnie Shelley	15	1968
2	Derrick Ansley	9	2003
3	Ronnie Shelley	8	1967
	Jack Smith	8	1970
	Tyrone Ferguson	8	1976
	Doug Mims	8	1988
	Elbert Mack	8	2007
8	David Cooper	7	1969
	Donnie Arnold	7	1982
	Chris Archie	7	1999

Single game
Rk	Player	Ints	Year	Opponent
1	Tyrone Ferguson	3	1968	Jacksonville State
	Ronnie Shelley	3	1968	North Alabama
	Jerome Crowe	3	1977	Northern Michigan
	Chris Archie	3	1999	Sam Houston State
	Sherrod Martin	3	2008	Alcorn State
	Montres Kitchens	3	2014	Idaho
	Justin Powe	3	2026	James Madison

=== Tackles ===
Career
Rk	Player	Tackles	Years
1	Carlton Martial	565	2018 2019 2020 2021 2022
2	Garrick Pimienta	563	1985 1986 1987 1988
3	Robert Bradley	465	1982 1983 1984 1985
4	Anthony Rabb	407	1996 1997 1998 1999
5	Naazir Yamini	374	1999 2000 2001 2002
6	Boris Lee	349	2006 2007 2008
7	Bryan Hubbard	344	1985 1986 1987 1988
8	Steve Stringfellow	338	1978 1979 1980 1981
9	Charles Pickett	334	1974 1975 1976
10	Rick Maxey	333	1974 1975 1976 1977

Single season
Rk	Player	Tackles	Year
1	Gerrick Pimienta	198	1987
2	Anthony Rabb	155	1999
3	Dennis Anderson	151	1973
4	Robert Bradley	149	1985
5	Robert Bradley	141	1983
6	Bryan Hubbard	137	1987
7	Robert Bradley	135	1984
	Carlton Martial	135	2022
9	Gerrick Pimienta	131	1986
10	Al Lucas	129	1999
	Naazir Yamini	129	2000

Single game
Rk	Player	Tackles	Year	Opponent
1	Anthony Rabb	23	1999	Middle Tennessee
2	Carlton Martial	22	2022	Army
3	Carlton Martial	21	2020	Coastal Carolina
4	Brynden Trawick	20	2011	Western Kentucky
5	Naazir Yamini	19	2000	Sam Houston State
	Devin Lafayette	19	2025	South Alabama
7	Anthony Rabb	18	1999	Texas State
	Naazir Yamini	18	2002	Mississippi State
	Carlton Martial	18	2021	Texas State
	Carlton Martial	18	2021	Appalachian State
	Carlton Martial	18	2022	Marshall

=== Sacks ===
Career
Rk	Player	Sacks	Years
1	Charles Pickett	43.0	1974 1975 1976
2	Javon Solomon	33.0	2019 2020 2021 2022 2023
3	Kenny Craik	31.0	1977 1978 1979 1980
4	Richard Jibunor	29.5	2020 2021 2022 2023
5	Reggie Lowe	28.0	1994 1995 1996 1997
6	Antjuan Marsh	27.5	1989 1990 1991 1992
	DeMarcus Ware	27.5	2001 2002 2003 2004
8	Rick Maxey	26.0	1974 1975 1976 1977
	Gary Bradshaw	26.0	1980 1981 1982 1983
10	Pratt Lyons	24.0	1995 1996
	Osi Umenyiora	24.0	1999 2000 2001 2002
	Brandon Lang	24.0	2006 2007 2008 2009

Single season
Rk	Player	Sacks	Year
1	Kenny Craik	20.0	1980
2	Charles Pickett	19.0	1975
	Charles Pickett	19.0	1976
4	Jessie Wallace	16.0	1980
	Javon Solomon	16.0	2023
6	Rick Maxey	15.0	1975
	Osi Umenyiora	15.0	2002
8	Pratt Lyons	14.0	1995
9	Jonathan Massaquoi	13.0	2010
10	Carnell Key	12.5	1985

Single game
Rk	Player	Sacks	Year	Opponent
1	Osi Umenyiora	4.0	2002	Florida A&M
	Javon Solomon	4.0	2023	UL Monroe
3	Kenny Mainor	3.5	2007	North Texas
	Javon Solomon	3.5	2021	Southern Miss
	Richard Jibunor	3.5	2023	UL Monroe

== Kicking ==
=== Field goals made ===
Career
Rk	Player	FGs	Years
1	Greg Whibbs	50	2003 2004 2005 2006 2007
2	Ted Clem	48	1984 1985 1986 1987
3	Lawrence Tynes	44	1997 1998 1999 2000
4	Scott Taylor Renfroe	41	2023 2024 2025
5	Tyler Sumpter	39	2017 2018 2019
6	Michael Taylor	36	2009 2010 2011
7	Ollie Quass	31	1992 1993 1994 1995
8	Ryan Kay	29	2013 2014 2015 2016
9	Will Scott	28	2012 2013
10	Sam Glusman	27	2008 2009

Single season
Rk	Player	FGs	Year
1	Sam Glusman	20	2008
2	Scott Taylor Renfroe	19	2023
3	Matt Huerkamp	18	1996
	Ryan Kay	18	2016
	Tyler Sumpter	18	2018
6	Will Scott	17	2012
	Michael Taylor	17	2010
	Brooks Buce	17	2022
9	Ted Clem	16	1984
	Ted Clem	16	1987
	Lawrence Tynes	16	2000
	Greg Whibbs	16	2007

Single game
Rk	Player	FGs	Year	Opponent
1	Greg Whibbs	4	2007	Florida Atlantic
	Scott Taylor Renfroe	4	2023	Army

=== Field goal percentage ===
Career
Rk	Player	FG%	Years
1	Randy Hicks	100.0%	1969 1970 1971
2	Brooks Buce	89.3%	2021 2022
3	Jed Solomon	78.9%	2012 2013 2014 2015
4	Will Scott	77.8%	2012 2013
5	Scott Taylor Renfroe	77.4%	2023 2024 2025
6	Lawrence Tynes	77.2%	1997 1998 1999 2000
7	Tyler Sumpter	76.5%	2017 2018 2019
8	Matt Huerkamp	75.0%	1996
9	Ryan Kay	74.4%	2013 2014 2015 2016
10	Michael Taylor	72.0%	2009 2010 2011

Single season
Rk	Player	FG%	Year
1	Brooks Buce	89.5%	2022
2	Greg Whibbs	88.9%	2007
3	Greg Whibbs	85.7%	2004
4	Scott Taylor Renfroe	84.6%	2024
5	Will Scott	81.0%	2012
6	Lawrence Tynes	80.0%	2000
7	Scott Taylor Renfroe	79.2%	2023
8	Jed Solomon	78.9%	2015
9	Michael Taylor	78.6%	2009
10	Ryan Kay	78.3%	2016
