= Sun Belt Conference football individual awards =

This is a list of Sun Belt Conference players and coaches who have been recognized for their work on the field at the end of each football season.

== Player of the Year ==
Season	Player	Pos.	Team	Ref.
2001	Wes Counts	QB	Middle Tennessee	
2002	Brandon Kennedy	DT	North Texas	
2003	Brandon Kennedy (2)	DT	North Texas	
2004	Jamario Thomas	RB	North Texas	
2005	Steven Jyles	QB	UL Monroe	
2006	Omar Haugabook	QB	Troy	
2007	Rusty Smith	QB	Florida Atlantic	
2008	Tyrell Fenroy	RB	UL Lafayette	
2009	Levi Brown	QB	Troy	
2010	T. Y. Hilton	WR	FIU	
2011	Ryan Aplin	QB	Arkansas State	
2012	Ryan Aplin (2)	QB	Arkansas State	
2013	Antonio Andrews	RB	Western Kentucky	
2014	Elijah McGuire	RB	UL Lafayette	
2015	Nick Arbuckle	QB	Georgia State	
2016	Ja'Von Rolland-Jones	DE	Arkansas State	
2017	Ja'Von Rolland-Jones (2)	DE	Arkansas State	
2018	Justice Hansen	QB	Arkansas State	
2019	Omar Bayless	WR	Arkansas State	
2020	Grayson McCall	QB	Coastal Carolina	
2021	Grayson McCall (2)	QB	Coastal Carolina	
2022	Grayson McCall (3)	QB	Coastal Carolina	
2023	Jordan McCloud	QB	James Madison	
2024	Mike Green	DE	Marshall	
2025	Alonza Barnett	QB	James Madison	

== Offensive Player of the Year ==
Season	Player	Pos.	Team	Ref.
2001	Dwone Hicks	RB	Middle Tennessee	
2002	Danny Smith	RB	Arkansas State	
2003	Patrick Cobbs	RB	North Texas	
2004	Jamario Thomas	RB	North Texas	
2005	Steven Jyles	QB	UL Monroe	
2006	Omar Haugabook	QB	Troy	
2007	Omar Haugabook (2)	QB	Troy	
2008	Michael Desormeaux	QB	UL Lafayette	
2009	Levi Brown	QB	Troy	
2010	Bobby Rainey	RB	Western Kentucky	
2011	Bobby Rainey (2)	RB	Western Kentucky	
2012	Kolton Browning	QB	UL Monroe	
2013	Antonio Andrews	RB	Western Kentucky	
2014	Elijah McGuire	RB	UL Lafayette	
2015	Larry Rose III	RB	New Mexico State	
2016	Jalin Moore	RB	Appalachian State	
2017	Justice Hansen	QB	Arkansas State	
2018	Zac Thomas	QB	Appalachian State	
2019	Darrynton Evans	RB	Appalachian State	
2020	Jonathan Adams	WR	Arkansas State	
2021	Jalen Tolbert	WR	South Alabama	
2022	Todd Centeio	QB	James Madison	
2023	Kimani Vidal	RB	Troy	
2024	Ben Wooldridge	QB	Louisiana	
2025	Colton Joseph	QB	Old Dominion	

== Defensive Player of the Year ==
Season	Player	Pos.	Team	Ref.
2001	Brad Kassell	LB	North Texas	
2002	Brandon Kennedy	DT	North Texas	
2003	Chris Hurd	LB	North Texas	
2004	DeMarcus Ware	DE	Troy State	
2005	Jeff Littlejohn	DT	Middle Tennessee	
2006	Keyonvis Bouie	LB	FIU	
2007	Tyrell Johnson	S	Arkansas State	
2008	Alex Carrington	DE	Arkansas State	
2009	Cardia Jackson	LB	UL Monroe	
2009	Chris McCoy	DE	Middle Tennessee	
2010	Jamari Lattimore	DE	Middle Tennessee	
2011	Brandon Joiner	DE	Arkansas State	
2012	Quanterus Smith	DE	Western Kentucky	
2013	Xavius Boyd	LB	Western Kentucky	
2014	David Mayo	LB	Texas State	
2015	Ronald Blair	DE	Appalachian State	
2016	Rashad Dillard	DE	Troy	
2017	Jeremy Reaves	S	South Alabama	
2018	Ronheen Bingham	DE	Arkansas State	
2019	Akeem Davis-Gaither	LB	Appalachian State	
2020	Tarron Jackson	DE	Coastal Carolina	
2021	D'Marco Jackson	LB	Appalachian State	
2022	Carlton Martial	LB	Troy	
2023	Jalen Green	DE	James Madison	
2024	Marques Watson-Trent	LB	Georgia Southern	
2025	Trent Hendrick	LB	James Madison	

== Coach of the Year ==
Season	Coach	Team	Ref.
2001	Darrell Dickey	North Texas	
2002	Darrell Dickey (2)	North Texas	
2003	Darrell Dickey (3)	North Texas	
2004	Darrell Dickey (4)	North Texas	
2005	Steve Roberts	Arkansas State	
2006	Rick Stockstill	Middle Tennessee	
2007	Howard Schnellenberger	Florida Atlantic	
2008	Larry Blakeney	Troy	
2009	Larry Blakeney (2)	Troy	
2009	Rick Stockstill	Middle Tennessee	
2010	Mario Cristobal	FIU	
2011	Hugh Freeze	Arkansas State	
2012	Todd Berry	UL Monroe	
2013	Joey Jones	South Alabama	
2014	Willie Fritz	Georgia Southern	
2015	Trent Miles	Georgia State	
2016	Paul Petrino	Idaho	
2017	Neal Brown	Troy	
2018	Scott Satterfield	Appalachian State	
2019	Billy Napier	Louisiana	
2020	Jamey Chadwell	Coastal Carolina	
2021	Billy Napier (2)	Louisiana	
2022	Jon Sumrall	Troy	
2023	Curt Cignetti	James Madison	
2024	Michael Desormeaux	Louisiana	
2025	Bob Chesney	James Madison	

== Freshman of the Year ==
Season	Player	Pos.	Team	Ref.
2001	Ja'Mal Branch	WR	North Texas	
2002	Paul Dombrowski	QB	New Mexico State	
2003	Kevin Payne	RB	UL Monroe	
2004	Jamario Thomas	RB	North Texas	
2005	Tyrell Fenroy	RB	UL Lafayette	
2006	Reggie Arnold	RB	Arkansas State	
2007	Giovanni Vizza	QB	North Texas	
2008	T. Y. Hilton	WR	FIU	
2009	Shawn Southward	RB	Troy	
2010	Corey Robinson	QB	Troy	
2011	Not awarded			
2012	J. D. McKissic	WR	Arkansas State	
2013	Elijah McGuire	RB	UL Lafayette	
2014	Taylor Lamb	QB	Appalachian State	
2015	Penny Hart	WR	Georgia State	
2016	Clifton Duck	CB	Appalachian State	
2017	Marcus Jones	CB	Troy	
2018	Marcel Murray	RB	Arkansas State	
2019	Layne Hatcher	QB	Arkansas State	
2020	Grayson McCall	QB	Coastal Carolina	
2021	Montrel Johnson Jr.	RB	Louisiana	
2022	Jared Brown	WR	Coastal Carolina	
2023	Jaylen Raynor	QB	Arkansas State	
2024	Ahmad Hardy	RB	UL Monroe	
2025	Sahir West	DL	James Madison	

== Newcomer of the Year ==
Season	Player	Pos.	Team	Ref.
2001	Kevin Galbreath	RB	North Texas	
2002	Jonathan Burke	CB	Arkansas State	
2003	Aubrey Dorisme	DE	New Mexico State	
2004	Dylan Lineberry	G	North Texas	
2005	Aaron Weathers	S	North Texas	
2006	Omar Haugabook	QB	Troy	
2007	Chris Bradwell	DT	Troy	
2008	Levi Brown	QB	Troy	
2009	Not awarded			
2010	Not awarded			
2011	Not awarded			
2012	Not awarded			
2013	Not awarded			
2014	Not awarded			
2015	Not awarded			
2016	Aikeem Coleman	DE	Idaho	
2017	Ron LaForce	S	New Mexico State	
2018	Kirk Merritt	WR	Arkansas State	
2019	Kaylon Geiger	WR	Troy	
2020	D'Jordan Strong	CB	Coastal Carolina	
2021	Chase Brice	QB	Appalachian State	
2022	Todd Centeio	QB	James Madison	
2023	Joey Aguilar	QB	Appalachian State	
2024	Braylon Braxton	QB	Marshall	
2025	Camden Brown	WR	Georgia Southern	
