= List of Troy Trojans in the NFL draft =

This is a list of Troy Trojans football players in the NFL draft.

== Key ==
B	Back	K	Kicker	NT	Nose tackle
C	Center	LB	Linebacker	FB	Fullback
DB	Defensive back	P	Punter	HB	Halfback
DE	Defensive end	QB	Quarterback	WR	Wide receiver
DT	Defensive tackle	RB	Running back	G	Guard
E	End	T	Offensive tackle	TE	Tight end

== Selections ==
Year	Round	Pick	Overall	Player	Team	Position
1969	14	11	349	Glen Thompson	Miami Dolphins	T
1970	13	4	316	Ronnie Shelly	New England Patriots	DB
1971	6	3	133	Jack Smith	Philadelphia Eagles	DB
1973	6	17	147	Wade Brantley	New York Giants	DT
1977	5	4	116	Perry Griggs	New York Jets	WR
1978	11	9	287	Willie McCray	San Francisco 49ers	DE
1980	10	21	270	Virgil Seay	Denver Broncos	WR
1981	8	24	217	Willie Tullis	Houston Oilers	WR
1982	9	1	224	Kelvin Murdock	New England Patriots	WR
1985	9	23	247	Mitch Geier	Washington Redskins	G
1986	9	13	234	Anthony Henton	Pittsburgh Steelers	LB
1988	11	9	286	Greg Harris	New York Giants	WR
1989	6	14	153	Titus Dixon	New York Jets	WR
1992	3	28	84	Leonard Wheeler	Cincinnati Bengals	DB
1992	8	21	217	Reggie Dwight	Atlanta Falcons	TE
1994	4	14	117	Orlando Parker	New York Jets	WR
1997	4	11	107	Pratt Lyons	Houston Oilers	DE
1998	6	2	155	Clifford Ivory	San Diego Chargers	DB
1999	6	5	174	Marcus Spriggs	Cleveland Browns	DT
2000	4	35	129	Michael Moore	Washington Redskins	G
2000	6	6	172	Mareno Philyaw	Atlanta Falcons	WR
2001	5	31	162	Jonathan Carter	New York Giants	WR
2003	2	24	56	Osi Umenyiora	New York Giants	DE
2003	7	34	248	Davern Williams	Miami Dolphins	DT
2005	1	11	11	DeMarcus Ware	Dallas Cowboys	DE
2007	4	32	131	Brannon Condren	Indianapolis Colts	DB
2008	1	11	11	Leodis McKelvin	Buffalo Bills	DB
2009	2	27	59	Sherrod Martin	Carolina Panthers	DB
2010	5	11	142	Cameron Sheffield	Kansas City Chiefs	LB
2010	6	32	201	Jorrick Calvin	Arizona Cardinals	DB
2010	7	2	209	Levi Brown	Buffalo Bills	QB
2011	3	19	83	Jerrel Jernigan	New York Giants	WR
2012	5	29	164	Jonathan Massaquoi	Atlanta Falcons	DE
2017	3	21	85	Antonio Garcia	New England Patriots	T
2023	4	5	107	Jake Andrews	New England Patriots	C
2024	5	33	168	Javon Solomon	Buffalo Bills	DE
2024	6	5	181	Kimani Vidal	Los Angeles Chargers	RB
