= 2010 Louisiana–Lafayette Ragin' Cajuns football team =

American college football season

2010 Louisiana–Lafayette Ragin' Cajuns football
- Conference: Sun Belt Conference
- Record: 3–9 (3–5 Sun Belt)
- Head coach: Rickey Bustle (9th season)
- Offensive coordinator: Ron Hudson (3rd season)
- Defensive coordinator: Kevin Fouquier (3rd season)
- Home stadium: Cajun Field

2010 Sun Belt Conference football standings
| | Conf. | | | Overall |
| Team | W | | L | W | | L |
|---|---|---|---|---|---|---|
| Troy + | 6 | – | 2 | 8 | – | 5 |
| FIU + | 6 | – | 2 | 7 | – | 6 |
| Middle Tennessee | 5 | – | 3 | 6 | – | 7 |
| Louisiana–Monroe | 4 | – | 4 | 5 | – | 7 |
| Arkansas State | 4 | – | 4 | 4 | – | 8 |
| Florida Atlantic | 3 | – | 5 | 4 | – | 8 |
| Louisiana–Lafayette | 3 | – | 5 | 3 | – | 9 |
| North Texas | 3 | – | 5 | 3 | – | 9 |
| Western Kentucky | 2 | – | 6 | 2 | – | 10 |
+ – Conference co-champions

The 2010 Louisiana–Lafayette Ragin' Cajuns football team represented the University of Louisiana at Lafayette in the 2010 NCAA Division I FBS college football season. The Ragin' Cajans were led by ninth-year head coach Rickey Bustle and played their home games at Cajun Field. The schedule featured a nationally-televised game from Cajun Field against Oklahoma State on October 8. In five home games the average attendance at Cajun Field was 17,383, with a season-high of 25,881 attending the Oklahoma State game.

The team finished with an overall record of 3–9 overall and 3–5 in the Sun Belt Conference. Bustle was fired on November 28, 2010. During his tenure he compiled a 41–65 record, including four six-win seasons. The team never reached a bowl game during this time.

== Preseason ==
=== Award watchlists ===
| Award | Player | Position | Year |
|---|---|---|---|
| John Mackey Award | Ladarius Green | TE | JR |
| Lombardi Award | Grant Fleming | LB | SR |

=== Sun Belt Media Day ===
==== Predicted standings ====
Sun Belt Conference predicted standings
| Predicted finish | Team | Votes (1st Place) |
| 1 | Middle Tennessee | 75 (5) |
| 2 | Troy | 73 (3) |
| 3 | Arkansas State | 53 |
| 4 | Louisiana-Lafayette | 49 (1) |
| 5 | Florida Atlantic | 45 |
| 6 | Florida International | 42 |
| 7 | Louisiana-Monroe | 32 |
| 8 | North Texas | 27 |
| 9 | Western Kentucky | 9 |

==== Preseason All–Conference Team ====
Offense

TE Ladarius Green

Defense

LB Grant Fleming

Specialist

P Spencer Ortego

== Roster ==
2010 Louisiana-Lafayette Ragin' Cajuns football team roster
Players
Coaches
Offense

| Pos. | # | Name | Class |
|---|---|---|---|
| WR | 3 | Pierre Hill | Jr |
| RB | 6 | Robert Walker | Fr |
| QB | 7 | Chris Masson | Jr |
| FB | 8 | Brad McGuire | Jr |
| QB | 13 | Brady Thomas | So |
| WR | 15 | Ross Goodlett | Jr |
| QB | 16 | Blake Hollingsworth | Fr |
| QB | 17 | Blaine Gautier | So |
| WR | 18 | Andrew Joseph | Jr |
| WR | 19 | Marlin Miller | Sr |
| RB | 20 | Aaron Spikes |
| RB | 25 | Kevis Streeter | Jr |
| FB | 26 | Yobes Walker | So |
| RB | 29 | Draylon Booker | So |
| RB | 33 | Julian Shankle | Jr |
| RB | 41 | Joel Banks | Fr |
| FB | 46 | Matt Desormeaux | Sr |
| OT | 51 | Colin Windsor | Sr |
| C | 60 | Ian Burks | Sr |
| OT | 62 | Robert Robinson | Fr |
| OL | 63 | Jarad Martin | Fr |
| C | 66 | Sean Osborne | So |
| C | 68 | Matthew Autrey | Jr |
| OL | 69 | Ashton Tyler | Fr |
| G | 70 | Evan Ruiz | So |
| G | 71 | Andre Huval | Fr |
| G | 72 | Leonardo Bates | So |
| OT | 73 | Jonathan DeCoster | Sr |
| G | 74 | Kyle Plouhar | Jr |
| G | 76 | Jaron Odom | So |
| OT | 77 | Nasser Jamal | Sr |
| G | 78 | Daniel Lemelle | Fr |
| OL | 79 | D'Amate Ledet | Fr |
| WR | 80 | Vernon Wolfe | Sr |
| WR | 81 | Richie Falgout | Sr |
| WR | 82 | Javone Lawson | So |
| WR | 83 | James Butler | Fr |
| TE | 85 | Ian Thompson | Fr |
| TE | 86 | Jacob Maxwell | Fr |
| WR | 87 | Darryl Surgent | Fr |
| TE | 88 | Brandon Williams | So |
| TE | 88 | Trace Wilson | So |
| TE | 89 | Ladarius Green | Jr |
| TE | 92 | Joe Jackson | Fr |
| WR | | Boris Anyama | Fr |
| WR | | Billy Christian | Fr |
| OL | | Marvin Martin | Fr |
| OL | | Daniel Quave | Fr |
| FB | | Amari Williams | Fr |
| OL | | Brendan Wilson | So |

Defense

| Pos. | # | Name | Class |
|---|---|---|---|
| CB | 2 | Orkeys Auriene | Sr |
| LB | 4 | Daylon McCoy | Sr |
| CB | 5 | Dwight Bentley | Jr |
| LB | 11 | Devon Lewis-Buchanan | Jr |
| SS | 20 | Chris Richard | Jr |
| SS | 21 | Lance Kelly | Jr |
| CB | 22 | Melvin White | Jr |
| CB | 23 | Rodney Gillis | So |
| FS | 24 | Lionel Stokes | Jr |
| SS | 27 | Earnest Gardner | Fr |
| SS | 30 | Le'Marcus Gibson | Jr |
| FS | 31 | Winston Burnette | Fr |
| DE | 34 | Justin Anderson | Fr |
| FS | 36 | Maurice Rolle | Sr |
| DB | 38 | Tim Jackson | So |
| CB | 39 | Julian Jones | Sr |
| LB | 43 | Jesse Broadnax | So |
| DE | 44 | Bernard Smith | Jr |
| DE | 45 | Emeke Onyenekwu | So |
| LB | 47 | Grant Fleming | Sr |
| LB | 48 | Andrew Hebert | Fr |
| LB | 49 | Kyron Benoit | Jr |
| DE | 53 | Christopher Tucker | Jr |
| LB | 55 | Brandon Nash | Fr |
| LB | 56 | Richard Brooks | Jr |
| LB | 57 | William Stevenson | Fr |
| DE | 58 | Nate Douglas | Jr |
| DT | 59 | Brandon McCray | Fr |
| DT | 64 | Ben Duhon | So |
| DT | 65 | Barry Sterling | So |
| DT | 90 | Derreck Dean | Jr |
| DT | 91 | Sharrick Moore | Sr |
| DT | 94 | Jermaine Rogers | Sr |
| DT | 95 | Benay Pryer | So |
| DE | 97 | Terrell Richardson | Sr |
| DT | 98 | Jordan Topp | Sr |
| DE | 99 | Tyrell Gaddies | Jr |
| DE | | Nick Barnfield | Fr |
| CB | | Reuban Foster | Fr |
| FS | | Cooper Gerami | Fr |
| DT | | Darrell Green | Fr |
| FS | | Seth Guilbeaux | Sr |
| DT | | Cordian Hagans | So |
| DT | | Donavain Mallet | Fr |
| LB | | Jake Molbert | Fr |
| CB | | Trevence Patt | Fr |
| LB | | Christian Sager | Fr |
| LB | | Jelani Smith | Jr |
| S | | Hunter Thibodeaux | Fr |
| DE | | Aaron Thibodeaux | Fr |
| LB | | Taylor Vernotzy | So |
| LB | | Darryl Williams | Fr |

Special teams

| Pos. | # | Name | Class |
|---|---|---|---|
| K | 10 | Tyler Albrecht | Sr |
| P | 35 | Spencer Ortego | Sr |
| K | 38 | Hunter Stover | Fr |
| K | 40 | Brett Baer | So |
| LS | 50 | Matt Gore | Fr |
| LS | 61 | Matt Rosenbalm | So |
| LS | | John Broussard | Fr |
| LS | | Brock Guidry | Fr |

Head coach

- Rickey Bustle (Clemson)

Coordinators/assistant coaches

- Ron Hudson (Louisville)
  Offensive coordinator
- Kevin Fouquier (Texas A&M)
  Defensive coordinator
- Jorge Munoz (Bethany (KS))
  Assistant coach
- Rusty Whitt (Abilene Christian)
  Strength & conditioning coach
- Troy Wingerter (Louisiana)
  Director of football operations

Legend

- (C) Team captain
- (S) Suspended
- (I) Ineligible
- Injured
- Redshirt

Roster
Last update: January 20, 2019

== Schedule ==
| Date | Time | Opponent | Site | TV | Result | Attendance |
|---|---|---|---|---|---|---|
| September 4 | 11:20 am | at No. 23 Georgia* | Sanford Stadium; Athens, Georgia | SEC Network | L 7–55 | 92,746 |
| September 11 | 2:30 pm | Arkansas State | Cajun Field; Lafayette, Louisiana | CST/CSS | W 31–24 | 15,103 |
| September 25 | 6:00 pm | Middle Tennessee | Cajun Field; Lafayette, Louisiana | | L 14–34 | 17,249 |
| October 2 | 6:30 pm | at North Texas | Fouts Field; Denton, Texas | CST/CSS | W 28–27 | 17,015 |
| October 8 | 8:00 pm | No. 21 Oklahoma State* | Cajun Field; Lafayette, Louisiana | ESPN2 | L 28–54 | 25,881 |
| October 16 | 6:00 pm | at Troy | Veterans Memorial Stadium; Troy, Alabama | | L 24–31 | 22,283 |
| October 23 | 4:00 pm | Western Kentucky^{†} | Cajun Field; Lafayette, Louisiana | | L 21–54 | 15,641 |
| October 30 | 1:00 pm | at Ohio* | Peden Stadium; Athens, Ohio | | L 31–38 | 15,255 |
| November 6 | 6:00 pm | at Ole Miss* | Vaught–Hemingway Stadium; Oxford, Mississippi | ESPNU | L 21–43 | 53,144 |
| November 13 | 6:00 pm | at Florida Atlantic | Lockhart Stadium; Ft. Lauderdale, Florida | | L 23–24 | 12,044 |
| November 20 | 6:00 pm | Florida International | Cajun Field; Lafayette, Louisiana | | L 17–38 | 13,041 |
| November 27 | 2:30 pm | at Louisiana–Monroe | Malone Stadium; Monroe, Louisiana (Battle on the Bayou) | | W 23–22 | 9,215 |
*Non-conference game; ^{†}Homecoming; Rankings from Coaches' Poll released prior to the game; All times are in Central time

== Game summaries ==
=== @ Georgia ===
Louisiana-Lafayette at Georgia – Game summary

| Quarter | 1 | 2 | 3 | 4 | Total |
|---|---|---|---|---|---|
| Ragin' Cajuns | 0 | 7 | 0 | 0 | 7 |
| No. 23 Bulldogs | 7 | 24 | 17 | 7 | 55 |

at Sanford Stadium, Athens, GA

- Date: September 4
- Game time: 11:00 a.m. CST
- Game weather: 77 °F (25 °C); sunny
- Game attendance: 92,746
- Referee: Tom Ritter
- TV: SECN

Game information

First quarter

- UGA - Caleb King 20-yard TD run, Blair Walsh kick good, 3:00 (UGA 7-0)

Second quarter

- UGA - Kris Durham 41-yard TD pass from Aaron Murray, Walsh kick good, 14:55 (UGA 14-0)
- UGA - Walsh 52-yard field goal, 11:21 (UGA 17-0)
- UGA - Shaun Chapas 10-yard TD pass from Murray, Walsh kick good, 3:31 (UGA 24-0)
- ULL - Ladarius Green 60-yard TD pass from Chris Masson, Brett Baer kick good, 1:13 (UGA 24-7)
- UGA - Murray 16-yard TD run, Walsh kick good, 0:00 (UGA 31-7)

Third quarter

- UGA - Walsh 47-yard field goal, 12:54 (UGA 34-7)
- UGA - Fred Munzenmaier 1-yard TD pass from Murray, Walsh kick good, 4:25 (UGA 41-7)
- UGA - Logan Gray 26-yard TD pass from Hutson Mason, Walsh kick good, 2:35 (UGA 48-7)

Fourth quarter

- UGA - Jakar Hamilton 17-yard interception returned for TD, Walsh kick good, 13:43 (UGA 55-7)

Top passers

- UGA - Aaron Murray - 17/26, 160 yards, 3 TD, INT
- ULL - Chris Masson - 5/15, 77 yards, TD, INT

Top rushers

- UGA - Carlton Thomas - 13 carries, 61 yards
- ULL - Kevis Streeter - 4 carries, 10 yards

Top receivers

- UGA - Kris Durham - 5 receptions, 83 yards, TD
- ULL - Ladarius Green - 4 receptions, 87 yards, TD

=== Arkansas State ===
Arkansas State at Louisiana-Lafayette – Game summary

| Quarter | 1 | 2 | 3 | 4 | Total |
|---|---|---|---|---|---|
| Red Wolves | 7 | 0 | 0 | 17 | 24 |
| Ragin' Cajuns | 10 | 14 | 7 | 0 | 31 |

at Cajun Field, Lafayette, LA

- Date: September 11
- Game time: 2:30 p.m. CST
- Game weather: 91 °F (33 °C); partly cloudy
- Game attendance: 15,103
- Referee: Riley Johnson
- TV: SBN

Game information

First quarter

- ULL - Kevis Streeter 69-yard TD run, Tyler Albrecht kick good, 12:43 (ULL 7-0)
- ULL - Albrecht 27-yard field goal, 3:09 (ULL 10-0)
- ARST - Taylor Stockemer 65-yard TD pass from Ryan Aplin, Bobby Zalud kick good, 2:51 (ULL 10-7)

Second quarter

- ULL - Ladarius Green 6-yard TD pass from Chris Masson, Albrecht kick good, 7:11 (ULL 17-7)
- ULL - Andrew Joseph 47-yard TD pass from Javone Lawson, Albrecht kick good, 4:03 (ULL 24-7)

Third quarter

- ULL - Masson 60-yard TD run, Albrecht kick good, 0:37 (ULL 31-7)

Fourth quarter

- ARST - Zalud 39-yard field goal, 13:24 (ULL 31-10)
- ARST - Aplin 5-yard TD run, Zalud kick good, 7:42 (ULL 31-17)
- ARST - Anthony Robinson 11-yard TD pass from Aplin, Zalud kick good, 3:27 (ULL 31-24)

Top passers

- ULL - Chris Masson - 14/24, 142 yards, TD
- ARST - Ryan Aplin - 25/42, 438 yards, 2 TD, INT

Top rushers

- ULL - Kevis Streeter - 2 carries, 71 yards, TD
- ARST - Jermaine Robertson - 5 carries, 8 yards

Top receivers

- ULL - Ladarius Green - 7 receptions, 97 yards, TD
- ARST - Allen Muse - 5 receptions, 133 yards

=== Middle Tennessee ===
Middle Tennessee at Louisiana-Lafayette – Game summary

| Quarter | 1 | 2 | 3 | 4 | Total |
|---|---|---|---|---|---|
| Blue Raiders | 3 | 17 | 14 | 0 | 34 |
| Ragin' Cajuns | 0 | 14 | 0 | 0 | 14 |

at Cajun Field, Lafayette, LA

- Date: September 25
- Game time: 6:00 p.m. CST
- Game weather: 85 °F (29 °C); partly cloudy
- Game attendance: 17,249
- Referee: Jeff Hilyer

Game information

First quarter

- MTSU - Alan Gendreau 40-yard field goal, 12:39 (MTSU 3-0)

Second quarter

- MTSU - D.D. Kyles 8-yard TD run, Gendreau kick good, 13:22 (MTSU 10-0)
- ULL - Ladarius Green 3-yard TD pass from Chris Masson, Tyler Albrecht kick good, 9:14 (MTSU 10-7)
- MTSU - Phillip Tanner 26-yard TD run, Gendreau kick good, 8:27 (MTSU 17-7)
- ULL - Blaine Gautier 2-yard TD run, Albrecht kick good, 3:04 (MTSU 17-14)
- MTSU - Gendreau 55-yard field goal, 1:07 (MTSU 20-14)

Third quarter

- MTSU - Malcolm Beyah 62-yard TD pass from Logan Kilgore, Gendreau kick good, 10:02 (MTSU 27-14)
- MTSU - Kyles 74-yard TD run, Gendreau kick good, 1:02 (MTSU 34-14)

Top passers

- MTSU - Logan Kilgore - 21/36, 207 yards, TD, INT
- ULL - Chris Masson - 16/32, 192 yards, TD

Top rushers

- MTSU - Phillip Tanner - 17 carries, 104 yards, TD
- ULL - Kevis Streeter - 11 carries, 63 yards

Top receivers

- MTSU - Malcolm Beyah - 2 receptions, 86 yards, TD
- ULL - Javone Lawson - 3 receptions, 53 yards

=== @ North Texas ===
Louisiana-Lafayette at North Texas – Game summary

| Quarter | 1 | 2 | 3 | 4 | Total |
|---|---|---|---|---|---|
| Ragin' Cajuns | 7 | 14 | 7 | 0 | 28 |
| Mean Green | 0 | 14 | 0 | 13 | 27 |

at Fouts Field, Denton, TX

- Date: October 2
- Game time: 6:30 p.m. CST
- TV: SBN

Game information

First quarter

- ULL - Blaine Gautier 2-yard TD run, Tyler Albrecht kick good, 6:23 (ULL 7-0)

Second quarter

- ULL - Lance Kelley 40-yard fumble return for TD, Albrecht kick good, 10:12 (ULL 14-0)
- UNT - Riley Dodge 6-yard TD run, Trent Deans kick good, 6:02 (ULL 14-7)
- ULL - Aaron Spikes 82-yard TD pass from Chris Masson, Albrecht kick good, 5:46 (ULL 21-7)
- UNT - Alex Lott 37-yard TD pass from Dodge, Deans kick good, 1:42 (ULL 21-14)

Third quarter

- ULL - Javone Lawson 60-yard TD pass from Masson, Albrecht kick good, 13:15 (ULL 28-14)

Fourth quarter

- UNT - Lance Dunbar 3-yard TD run, Deans kick good, 8:53 (ULL 28-21)
- UNT - Darius Carey 4-yard TD pass from Dodge, Deans kick no good, 0:32 (ULL 28-27)

Top passers

- ULL - Chris Masson - 18/32, 310 yards, 2 TD
- UNT - Riley Dodge - 22/31, 191 yards, 2 TD, INT

Top rushers

- ULL - Aaron Spikes - 7 carries, 18 yards
- UNT - Lance Dunbar - 24 carries, 141 yards, TD

Top receivers

- ULL - Aaron Spikes - 4 receptions, 99 yards, TD
- UNT - Darius Carey - 5 receptions, 49 yards, TD

=== Oklahoma State ===
Oklahoma State at Louisiana-Lafayette – Game summary

| Quarter | 1 | 2 | 3 | 4 | Total |
|---|---|---|---|---|---|
| No. 22 Cowboys | 10 | 7 | 24 | 13 | 54 |
| Ragin' Cajuns | 0 | 21 | 7 | 0 | 28 |

at Cajun Field, Lafayette, LA

- Date: October 8
- Game time: 8:00 p.m. CST
- Game weather: 78 °F (26 °C); clear
- Game attendance: 25,881
- Referee: Tony Backert
- TV: ESPN2

Game information

First quarter

- OSU - Dan Bailey 52-yard field goal, 12:38 (OSU 3-0)
- OSU - Justin Blackmon 11-yard TD pass from Brandon Weeden, Bailey kick good, 4:40 (OSU 10-0)

Second quarter

- ULL - Blaine Gautier 1-yard TD run, Brett Baer kick good, 13:13 (OSU 10-7)
- OSU - Blackmon 37-yard TD pass from Weeden, Bailey kick good, 11:07 (OSU 17-7)
- ULL - James Butler 35-yard TD pass from Chris Masson, Baer kick good, 4:35 (OSU 17-14)
- ULL - Aaron Spikes 7-yard TD pass from Masson, Baer kick good, 0:21 (ULL 21-17)

Third quarter

- OSU - Kendall Hunter 2-yard TD run, Bailey kick good, 12:24 (OSU 24-21)
- OSU - Michael Harrison 24-yard TD pass from Weeden, Bailey kick good, 10:55 (OSU 31-21)
- OSU - Hubert Anyiam 22-yard TD pass from Weeden, Bailey kick good, 6:04 (OSU 38-21)
- ULL - Darryl Surgent 97-yard kickoff returned for TD, Baer kick good, 5:49 (OSU 38-28)
- OSU - Bailey 25-yard field goal, 1:04 (OSU 41-28)

Fourth quarter

- OSU - Bailey 52-yard field goal, 9:44 (OSU 44-28)
- OSU - Bailey 47-yard field goal, 6:17 (OSU 47-28)
- OSU - Wilson Youman 1-yard TD pass from Weeden, Bailey kick good, 4:59 (OSU 54-28)

Top passers

- OSU - Brandon Weeden - 29/47, 351 yards, 5 TD, 2 INT
- ULL - Chris Masson - 33/55, 308 yards, 2 TD, INT

Top rushers

- OSU - Kendall Hunter - 28 carries, 126 yards, TD
- ULL - Blaine Gautier - 10 carries, 30 yards, TD

Top receivers

- OSU - Justin Blackmon - 13 receptions, 190 yards, 2 TD
- ULL - James Butler - 4 receptions, 62 yards, TD

=== @ Troy ===
Louisiana-Lafayette at Troy – Game summary

| Quarter | 1 | 2 | 3 | 4 | Total |
|---|---|---|---|---|---|
| Ragin' Cajuns | 7 | 7 | 0 | 10 | 24 |
| Trojans | 0 | 17 | 0 | 14 | 31 |

at Veterans Memorial Stadium, Troy, AL

- Date: October 16
- Game time: 6:00 p.m. CST
- Game weather: 69 °F (21 °C); clear
- Game attendance: 22,283
- Referee: Jeff Hilyer

Game information

First quarter

- ULL - Brad McGuire 1-yard TD run, Brett Baer kick good, 10:54 (ULL 7-0)

Second quarter

- TROY - Shawn Southward 6-yard TD run, Michael Taylor kick good, 14:57 (TIE 7-7)
- ULL - McGuire 1-yard TD run, Baer kick good, 9:12 (ULL 14-7)
- TROY - Taylor 26-yard field goal, 4:58 (ULL 14-10)
- TROY - Jerrel Jernigan 75-yard punt returned for TD, Taylor kick good, 2:45 (TROY 17-14)

Fourth quarter

- ULL - Marlin Miller 5-yard TD pass from Chris Masson, Baer kick good, 12:54 (ULL 21-17)
- TROY - Jason Bruce 34-yard TD pass from Jonathan Chandler, Taylor kick good, 9:26 (TROY 24-21)
- ULL - Baer 42-yard field goal, 7:11 (TIE 24-24)
- TROY - Jernigan 12-yard TD pass from Corey Robinson, Taylor kick good, 4:43 (TROY 31-24)

Top passers

- TROY - Corey Robinson - 23/33, 237 yards, TD, 3 INT
- ULL - Chris Masson - 23/41, 246 yards, TD, INT

Top rushers

- TROY - Chris Anderson - 11 carries, 49 yards
- ULL - Aaron Spikes - 14 carries, 40 yards

Top receivers

- TROY - Jerrel Jernigan - 6 receptions, 77 yards, TD
- ULL - Ladarius Green - 4 receptions, 96 yards

=== Western Kentucky ===
Western Kentucky at Louisiana-Lafayette – Game summary

| Quarter | 1 | 2 | 3 | 4 | Total |
|---|---|---|---|---|---|
| Hilltoppers | 3 | 24 | 13 | 14 | 54 |
| Ragin' Cajuns | 0 | 7 | 7 | 7 | 21 |

at Cajun Field, Lafayette, LA

- Date: October 23
- Game time: 4:00 p.m. CST

Game information

First quarter

- WKU - Casey Tinius 20-yard field goal, 2:17 (WKU 3-0)

Second quarter

- WKU - Jamarcus Allen 69-yard fumble returned for TD, Tinius kick good, 13:01 (WKU 10-0)
- ULL - Aaron Spikes 52-yard TD pass from Chris Masson, Brett Baer kick good, 11:35 (WKU 10-7)
- WKU - Kawaun Jakes 1-yard TD run, Tinius kick good, 3:02 (WKU 17-7)
- WKU - Antonio Andrews 4-yard TD run, Tinius kick good, 1:48 (WKU 24-7)
- WKU - Tinius 47-yard field goal, 0:00 (WKU 27-7)

Third quarter

- ULL - Brad McGuire 1-yard TD run, Baer kick good, 10:25 (WKU 27-14)
- WKU - Jakes 1-yard TD run, Tinius kick no good, 7:38 (WKU 33-14)
- WKU - Demetrius Coley 43-yard TD pass from Jakes, Tinius kick good, 1:14 (WKU 40-14)

Fourth quarter

- WKU - Derrius Brooks 62-yard interception returned for TD, Tinius kick good, 13:17 (WKU 47-14)
- WKU - Andrews 30-yard TD run, Tinius kick good, 9:25 (WKU 54-14)
- ULL - McGuire 1-yard TD run, Baer kick good, 1:45 (WKU 54-21)

Top passers

- WKU - Kawaun Jakes - 18/22, 262 yards, TD
- ULL - Chris Masson - 16/34, 223 yards, TD, 2 INT

Top rushers

- WKU - Bobby Rainey, Jr. - 21 carries, 67 yards
- ULL - Aaron Spikes - 9 carries, 42 yards

Top receivers

- WKU - Willie McNeal - 5 receptions, 88 yards
- ULL - Vernon Wolfe - 4 receptions, 94 yards

=== @ Ohio ===
Louisiana-Lafayette at Ohio – Game summary

| Quarter | 1 | 2 | 3 | 4 | Total |
|---|---|---|---|---|---|
| Ragin' Cajuns | 0 | 14 | 3 | 14 | 31 |
| Bobcats | 7 | 3 | 6 | 22 | 38 |

at Peden Stadium, Athens, OH

- Date: October 30
- Game time: 1:00 p.m. CST
- Game weather: 56 °F (13 °C); sunny
- Game attendance: 15,255
- Referee: Stan Evans

Game information

First quarter

- OHIO - Boo Jackson 7-yard TD run, Matt Weller kick good, 7:55 (OHIO 7-0)

Second quarter

- ULL - Aaron Spikes 20-yard TD pass from Brad McGuire, Brett Baer kick good, 13:52 (TIE 7-0)
- ULL - Spikes 7-yard TD run, Baer kick good, 7:07 (ULL 14-7)
- OHIO - Weller 34-yard field goal, 1:33 (ULL 14-10)

Third quarter

- ULL - Baer 20-yard field goal. 8:26 (ULL 17-10)
- OHIO - Jordan Thompson 3-yard TD pass from Jackson, Weller kick no good, 3:43 (ULL 17-16)

Fourth quarter

- OHIO - Terrence McCrae 13-yard TD pass from Jackson, Riley Dunlop two-point conversion pass from Jackson good, 13:40 (OHIO 24-17)
- OHIO - Bakari Bussey 24-yard TD pass from Jackson, Weller kick good, 9:17 (OHIO 31-17)
- ULL - Spikes 1-yard TD run, Baer kick good, 5:21 (OHIO 31-24)
- OHIO - Ryan Boykin 20-yard TD run, Weller kick good, 3:43 (OHIO 38-24)
- ULL - Ladarius Green 3-yard TD pass from McGuire, Baer kick good, 1:36 (OHIO 38-31)

Top passers

- OHIO - Boo Jackson - 16/22, 240 yards, 3 TD, 4 INT
- ULL - Brad McGuire - 25/39, 384 yards, 2 TD, INT

Top rushers

- OHIO - Boo Jackson - 11 carries, 74 yards, TD
- ULL - Aaron Spikes - 12 carries, 37 yards, 2 TD

Top receivers

- OHIO - Steve Goulet - 5 receptions, 126 yards
- ULL - Darryl Surgent - 4 receptions, 110 yards

=== @ Ole Miss ===
Louisiana-Lafayette at Ole Miss – Game summary

| Quarter | 1 | 2 | 3 | 4 | Total |
|---|---|---|---|---|---|
| Ragin' Cajuns | 7 | 14 | 0 | 0 | 21 |
| Rebels | 24 | 6 | 3 | 10 | 43 |

at Vaught-Hemingway Stadium, Oxford, MS

- Date: November 6
- Game time: 6:00 p.m. CST
- Game weather: 54 °F (12 °C); fair
- Game attendance: 53,144
- Referee: Penn Wagers
- TV: ESPNU

Game information

First quarter

- ULL - Aaron Spikes 27-yard TD pass from Brad McGuire, Brett Baer kick good, 12:24 (ULL 7-0)
- MISS - Brandon Bolden 2-yard TD run, Bryson Rose kick good, 10:04 (TIE 7-7)
- MISS - Rose 24-yard field goal, 4:50 (MISS 10-7)
- MISS - Jeremiah Masoli 6-yard TD run, Rose kick good, 3:19 (MISS 17-7)
- MISS - Bolden 15-yard TD pass from Masoli, Rose kick good, 0:41 (MISS 24-7)

Second quarter

- MISS - Rose 30-yard field goal, 8:03 (MISS 27-7)
- ULL - McGuire 3-yard TD run, Baer kick good, 4:51 (MISS 27-14)
- ULL - Melvin White 93-yard fumble return for TD, Baer kick good, 0:31 (MISS 27-21)
- MISS - Rose 30-yard field goal, 0:00 (MISS 30-21)

Third quarter

- MISS - Rose 27-yard field goal, 1:43 (MISS 33-21)

Fourth quarter

- MISS - Rose 20-yard field goal, 10:56 (MISS 36-21)
- MISS - Bolden 3-yard TD run, Rose kick good, 0:58 (MISS 43-21)

Top passers

- MISS - Nathan Stanley - 6/14, 108 yards
- ULL - Brad McGuire - 7/21, 139 yards, TD, 2 INT

Top rushers

- MISS - Brandon Bolden - 18 carries, 136 yards, 2 TD
- ULL - Brad McGuire - 14 carries, 42 yards, TD

Top receivers

- MISS - Brandon Bolden - 4 receptions, 80 yards, TD
- ULL - Aaron Spikes - 2 receptions, 54 yards, TD

=== @ Florida Atlantic ===
Louisiana-Lafayette at Florida Atlantic – Game summary

| Quarter | 1 | 2 | 3 | 4 | Total |
|---|---|---|---|---|---|
| Ragin' Cajuns | 0 | 7 | 7 | 9 | 23 |
| Owls | 14 | 0 | 7 | 3 | 24 |

at Lockhart Stadium, Fort Lauderdale, FL

- Date: November 13
- Game time: 6:00 p.m. CST
- Game weather: 78 °F (26 °C); clear
- Game attendance: 12,044
- Referee: Riley Johnson

Game information

First quarter

- FAU - Xavier Stinson 4-yard TD pass from Jeff Van Camp, Ross Gornall kick good, 10:40 (FAU 7-0)
- FAU - Lester Jean 45-yard TD pass from Van Camp, Gornall kick good, 2:43 (FAU 14-0)

Second quarter

- ULL - Ladarius Green 17-yard TD pass from Blaine Gautier, Brett Baer kick good, 0:54 (FAU 14-7)

Third quarter

- FAU - Alfred Morris 16-yard TD pass from Van Camp, Gornall kick good, 8:09 (FAU 21-7)
- ULL - Gautier 10-yard TD run, Baer kick good, 2:21 (FAU 21-14)

Fourth quarter

- FAU - Gornall 23-yard field goal, 9:07 (FAU 24-14)
- ULL - Baer 37-yard field goal, 4:42 (FAU 24-17)
- ULL - Vernon Wolfe 43-yard TD pass from Gautier, two-point conversion pass no good, 1:45, (FAU 24-23)

Top passers

- FAU - Jeff Van Camp - 11/18, 183 yards, 3 TD
- ULL - Blaine Gautier - 21/36, 254 yards, 2 TD, INT

Top rushers

- FAU - Alfred Morris - 22 carries, 143 yards
- ULL - Blaine Gautier - 15 carries, 86 yards, TD

Top receivers

- FAU - Rob Housler - 3 receptions, 73 yards
- ULL - Ladarius Green - 6 receptions, 111 yards, TD

=== Florida International ===
Florida International at Louisiana-Lafayette – Game summary

| Quarter | 1 | 2 | 3 | 4 | Total |
|---|---|---|---|---|---|
| Panthers | 0 | 7 | 17 | 14 | 38 |
| Ragin' Cajuns | 0 | 3 | 14 | 0 | 17 |

at Cajun Field, Lafayette, LA

- Date: November 20
- Game time: 6:00 p.m. CST
- Game weather: 65 °F (18 °C); cloudy
- Game attendance: 13,041
- Referee: Kevin Stine

Game information

First quarter

- FIU - Johnathan Faucher 6-yard TD pass from Wesley Carroll, Jack Griffin kick good, 11:30 (FIU 7-0)
- ULL - Brett Baer 25-yard field goal, 7:20 (FIU 7-3)

Second quarter

- FIU - Darriet Perry 5-yard TD run, Griffin kick good, 13:50 (FIU 14-3)
- FIU - Griffin 25-yard field goal, 9:47 (FIU 17-3)
- ULL - Ladarius Green 50-yard TD pass from Blaine Gautier, Baer kick good, 8:36 (FIU 17-10)
- FIU - Junior Mertile 26-yard interception returned for TD, Griffin kick good, 4:05 (FIU 24-10)
- ULL - Gautier 55-yard TD run, Baer kick good, 3:05 (FIU 24-17)

Fourth quarter

- FIU - Perry 3-yard TD run, Griffin kick good, 5:52 (FIU 31-17)
- FIU - Perry 7-yard TD run, Griffin kick good, 3:52 (FIU 38-17)

Top passers

- FIU - Wesley Carroll - 16/19, 162 yards, TD
- ULL - Blaine Gautier - 13/29, 186 yards, TD, 3 INT

Top rushers

- FIU - Darian Mallary - 15 carries, 84 yards
- ULL - Blaine Gautier - 28 carries, 112 yards, TD

Top receivers

- FIU - T. Y. Hilton - 4 receptions, 73 yards
- ULL - Ladarius Green - 6 receptions, 103 yards, TD

=== @ Louisiana–Monroe ===
Louisiana-Lafayette at Louisiana-Monroe – Game summary

| Quarter | 1 | 2 | 3 | 4 | Total |
|---|---|---|---|---|---|
| Ragin' Cajuns | 3 | 7 | 13 | 0 | 23 |
| Warhawks | 10 | 3 | 0 | 9 | 22 |

at Malone Stadium, Monroe, LA

- Date: November 27
- Game time: 2:30 p.m. CST
- Game weather: 63 °F (17 °C); clear
- Game attendance: 9,215
- Referee: Tony Backert

Game information

First quarter

- ULM - Keavon Milton 1-yard TD pass from Kolton Browning, Radi Jabour kick good, 12:00 (ULM 7-0)
- ULM - Jabour 34-yard field goal, 6:50 (ULM 10-0)
- ULL - Brett Baer 25-yard field goal, 2:07 (ULM 10-3)

Second quarter

- ULM - Jabour 40-yard field goal, 14:55 (ULM 13-3)
- ULL - Aaron Spikes 73-yard TD pass from Chris Masson, Baer kick good, 8:15 (ULM 13-10)

Third quarter

- ULL - Baer 31-yard field goal, 12:16 (TIE 13-13)
- ULL - Baer 32-yard field goal, 8:55 (ULL 16-13)
- ULL - Ladarius Green 5-yard TD pass from Masson, Baer kick good, 0:35 (ULL 23-13

Fourth quarter

- ULM - Jabour 28-yard field goal, 9:33 (ULL 23-16)
- ULM - Browning 10-yard TD run, Jabour kick blocked, 4:55 (ULL 23-22)

Top passers

- ULL - Chris Masson - 21/43, 330 yards, 2 TD, INT
- ULM - Kolton Browning - 17/37, 164 yards, TD, INT

Top rushers

- ULL - Robert Walker - 9 carries, 30 yards
- ULM - Frank Goodin - 17 carries, 94 yards

Top receivers

- ULL - Ladarius Green - 6 receptions, 120 yards, TD
- ULM - Brent Leonard - 3 receptions, 44 yards
