= Corey Robinson (quarterback) =

American football player (born 1990)

No. 5
- Position: Quarterback

Personal information
- Born: March 29, 1990 (age 36); Paducah, Kentucky, U.S.
- Listed height: 6 ft 0 in (1.83 m)
- Listed weight: 205 lb (93 kg)

Career information
- High school: Lone Oak (Paducah, Kentucky)
- College: Troy (2009–2013)
- NFL draft: 2014: undrafted

Career history
- Hamilton Tiger-Cats (2014)*; Brooklyn Bolts (2014)
- * Offseason or practice squad member only

Awards and highlights
- Sun Belt Freshman of the Year (2010); First-team All-Sun Belt (2013); Second-team All-Sun Belt (2010)

Corey Lee Robinson (born March 29, 1990) is an American former football quarterback who played for the Brooklyn Bolts of the Fall Experimental Football League (FXFL). He played college football for the Troy Trojans.

== Early life ==
Robinson attended Lone Oak High School in Paducah, Kentucky. As a senior at Lone Oak, Robinson set a national high school record with 91 touchdown passes. He was also selected as Mr. Football in Kentucky.

== College career ==
Robinson enrolled at Troy University in Alabama in 2009, redshirting his first year. In his first season of play as a redshirt freshman in 2010, he completed 321 of 505 passes for 3,726 and 28 touchdowns. His 3,726 passing yards ranked ninth among all NCAA Division I FBS players in 2010. He led Troy to a post-season 48–21 victory over the Ohio Bobcats in the 2010 New Orleans Bowl, passing for 387 yards and four touchdowns in the game.

In the second game of the 2011 season, Robinson threw for 373 yards and three touchdowns against the Arkansas Razorbacks. For the season, Robinson completed 316 of 508 passes for 3,411 yards and 21 touchdowns.

During the 2012 season, Robinson completed 257 of 389 passes for 3,121 yards with 12 touchdowns and nine interceptions. As a senior in 2013, he completed 268 of 399 passes for 3,086 yards with 19 touchdowns and nine interceptions. One of his more memorable performances came the first game of his senior year when he rallied his team from a 31–17 deficit vs UAB to a 34–31 OT win, in the process breaking Steve Sarkisian's record for highest completion percentage with a minimum of 30 attempts. Robinson completed 30 of 32 attempts for a new record of 93.8%.

=== College statistics ===
Season	Team	Passing								Rushing			
Season	Team	Cmp	Att	Pct	Yds	Y/A	TD	Int	Rtg	Att	Yds	Avg	TD
2010	Troy	321	505	63.6	3,726	7.4	28	15	137.9	48	-100	-2.1	0
2011	Troy	316	508	62.2	3,411	6.7	21	15	126.3	46	-78	-1.7	1
2012	Troy	257	389	66.1	3,121	8.0	12	9	139.0	21	-47	-2.2	1
2013	Troy	285	421	67.7	3,219	7.6	20	9	143.3	35	-111	-3.2	1
Career		1,179	1,823	64.7	13,477	7.4	81	48	136.2	150	-336	-2.2	3

== Professional career ==
Pre-draft measurables
Height	Weight	Arm length	Hand span	Wingspan	40-yard dash	10-yard split	20-yard split	20-yard shuttle	Three-cone drill	Vertical jump	Broad jump
6 ft 0 1/2 in (1.84 m)	208 lb (94 kg)	31 1/2 in (0.80 m)	9 3/4 in (0.25 m)	6 ft 1 1/2 in (1.87 m)	5.06 s	1.78 s	2.99 s	4.80 s	7.53 s	28.0 in (0.71 m)	8 ft 6 in (2.59 m)
All values from Pro Day

In May 2014, Robinson participated in Cleveland Browns' rookie minicamp on a tryout basis. He signed with the Hamilton Tiger-Cats on June 1 and was released by the team on June 22. In September 2014, he signed with the Brooklyn Bolts of the Fall Experimental Football League.
