= 2010 Sun Belt Conference football season =

- League: NCAA Division I FBS (Football Bowl Subdivision)
- Sport: football
- Duration: September 2, 2010 to January 6, 2011
- Teams: 9
- TV partner: ESPN

2011 NFL Draft
- Top draft pick: TE Rob Housler, Florida Atlantic
- Picked by: Arizona Cardinals, 69th overall

Regular season

Football seasons
- 2009 2011

2010 Sun Belt Conference football standings
	Conf.			Overall
Team	W		L	W		L
Troy +	6	–	2	8	–	5
FIU +	6	–	2	7	–	6
Middle Tennessee	5	–	3	6	–	7
Louisiana–Monroe	4	–	4	5	–	7
Arkansas State	4	–	4	4	–	8
Florida Atlantic	3	–	5	4	–	8
Louisiana–Lafayette	3	–	5	3	–	9
North Texas	3	–	5	3	–	9
Western Kentucky	2	–	6	2	–	10
+ – Conference co-champions

The 2010 Sun Belt Conference football season was the 10th season of college football play for the Sun Belt Conference. The season began September 2, 2010 and concluded January 6, 2011 as part of the 2010-11 NCAA Division I FBS football season. The Sun Belt Conference consisted of 9 football members: Arkansas State, Florida Atlantic, Florida International, Louisiana-Lafayette, Louisiana-Monroe, Middle Tennessee, North Texas, Troy, and Western Kentucky.

== Previous season ==
Troy (9–4) was the Sun Belt champions and lost to Central Michigan in the GMAC Bowl 44–41 in overtime. Although Troy was the conference champion, the team decided to accept an invitation to play in the GMAC Bowl, giving another Sun Belt team the privilege of playing in the R+L Carriers New Orleans Bowl. That team was Middle Tennessee (10–3), who became the Sun Belt's first ever 10 win team since the league began playing FBS football in 2001. The 10–3 record earned Middle Tennessee a trip to the R+L Carriers New Orleans Bowl where they faced Southern Miss and won 42–32.

One other Sun Belt team, Louisiana-Monroe, was bowl eligible with record of 6-6 but was not invited to a bowl game.

== Preseason ==
=== Sun Belt Coaches Poll ===
The 2010 Sun Belt coaches preseason poll was announced during a two-day media web-based event on July 19 and 20. Middle Tennessee was selected as the favorite to win the conference.

First Place Votes in Parentheses

1. Middle Tennessee – 75 (5)
2. Troy – 73 (3)
3. Arkansas State – 53
4. Louisiana-Lafayette – 49 (1)
5. Florida Atlantic - 45
6. Florida International – 42
7. Louisiana-Monroe – 32
8. North Texas – 27
9. Western Kentucky - 9

=== Pre-Season All-Sun Belt Team ===
Offense

- Dwight Dasher (MT Sr., QB)
- Alfred Morris (FAU Jr., RB)
- Lance Dunbar (NT Jr., RB)
- T. Y. Hilton (FIU Jr., WR)
- Jerrel Jernigan (Troy Sr., WR)
- Ladarius Green (ULL Jr., TE)
- Derek Newton (ASU Sr., OL)
- Brad Serirni (FIU Sr., OL)
- Mark Fisher (MT Sr., OL)
- Esteban Santiago (NT Sr., OL)
- Tyler Clark (Troy Sr., OL)

Defense

- Bryan Hall (ASU Sr., DL)
- Troy Evans (ULM Jr., DL)
- Jamari Lattimore (MT Sr., DL)
- Brandon Akpunku (NT Jr., DL)
- Demario Davis (ASU Jr., LB)
- Grant Fleming (ULL Sr., LB)
- Craig Robertson (NT Sr., LB)
- Tavious Polo (FAU Sr., DB)
- Anthony Gaitor (FIU Sr., DB)
- Jeremy Kellem (MT Sr., DB)
- Bryan Willis (Troy, So., DB)

Special teams

- Alan Gendreau (MT Jr., Place Kicker)
- Spencer Ortego (ULL Sr., Punter)
- T. Y. Hilton (FIU Jr., Return Specialist)

Offensive Player of the Year

- Dwight Dasher (MT Sr., QB)

Defensive Player of the Year

- Bryan Hall (ASU Sr., DL)

== Postseason ==
All three bowl-eligible Sun Belt teams were invited to participate in bowl games. These teams compiled a 2–1 record in postseason play.

Bowl	Date	Time	SBC team (Record)	Opponent (Record)	Site	TV	Result	Attendance
2010 R+L Carriers New Orleans Bowl	December 18	9:00 p.m.	Troy (7–5)	Ohio (8–4)	Mercedes-Benz Superdome • New Orleans	ESPN	W 48-21	29,159
2010 Little Caesars Pizza Bowl	December 26	8:30 p.m.	Florida International (6-6)	Toledo (8–4)	Ford Field • Detroit	ESPN	W 34-32	32,431
2011 GoDaddy.com Bowl	January 6	8:00 p.m.	Middle Tennessee (6-6)	Miami (OH) (9–4)	Ladd–Peebles Stadium • Mobile, Alabama	ESPN	L 21-35	38,168

== Players of the Year ==
2010 Sun Belt Player of the Year awards

Award	Player	School
Player of the Year	T. Y. Hilton	Florida International
Offensive Player of the Year	Bobby Rainey	Western Kentucky
Defensive Player of the Year	Jamari Lattimore	Middle Tennessee
Freshman of the Year	Corey Robinson	Troy
Coach of the Year	Mario Cristobal	Florida International

== All-Sun Belt Team ==
Coaches All-Conference Selections

Position	Player	Class	Team
First Team Offense
QB	Ryan Aplin	SO	Arkansas State
RB	Lance Dunbar	JR	North Texas
RB	Bobby Rainey	JR	Western Kentucky
WR	T. Y. Hilton	JR	Florida International
WR	Jerrel Jernigan	SR	Troy
TE	Ladarius Green	JR	Louisiana-Lafayette
OL	Brad Serini	SR	Florida International
OL	Tyler Clark	SR	Troy
OL	Victor Gill	SR	North Texas
OL	Derek Newton	SR	Arkansas State
OL	Esteban Santiago	SR	North Texas
First Team Defense
DL	Bryan Hall	SR	Arkansas State
DL	Jamari Lattimore	SR	Middle Tennessee
DL	Jonathan Massaquoi	SO	Troy
DL	Jarvis Wilson	SR	Florida International
LB	Demario Davis	JR	Arkansas State
LB	Toronto Smith	SR	Florida International
LB	Craig Robertson	SR	North Texas
DB	M. D. Jennings	SR	Arkansas State
DB	Anthony Gaitor	SR	Florida International
DB	Rod Issac	SR	Middle Tennessee
DB	Jeremy Kellem	SR	Middle Tennessee
First Team Special Teams
PK	Alan Gendreau	JR	Middle Tennessee
P	Mickey Groody	JR	Florida Atlantic
RS	T. Y. Hilton	JR	Florida International
AP	Jerrel Jernigan	SR	Troy

Position	Player	Class	Team
Second Team Offense
QB	Corey Robinson	FR	Troy
RB	Phillip Tanner	SR	Middle Tennessee
RB	Darriet Perry	JR	Florida International
WR	Lestar Jean	SR	Florida Atlantic
WR	Luther Ambrose	JR	Louisiana-Monroe
TE	Rob Housler	SR	Florida Atlantic
OL	Tom Castilaw	SR	Arkansas State
OL	Sifa Etu	SR	Arkansas State
OL	Ian Burks	SR	Louisiana-Lafayette
OL	Mark Fisher	SR	Middle Tennessee
OL	James Brown	JR	Troy
Second Team Defense
DL	Dorvus Woods	JR	Arkansas State
DL	Tourek Williams	SO	Florida International
DL	Ken Dorsey	JR	Louisiana-Monroe
DL	Mario Addison	SR	Troy
LB	Javon McKinnon	SR	Arkansas State
LB	Michael Lockley	SR	Florida Atlantic
LB	Thomas Majors	SR	Western Kentucky
DB	Marcus Bartels	JR	Florida Atlantic
DB	Tavious Polo	SR	Florida Atlantic
DB	Johnathan Cyprien	SO	Florida International
DB	Darius Prelow	JR	Louisiana-Monroe
Second Team Special Teams
PK	Zach Olen	FR	North Texas
P	Josh Davis	FR	Middle Tennessee
RS	Jerrel Jernigan	SR	Troy
AP	T. Y. Hilton	JR	Florida International
