= 2010 Arkansas State Red Wolves football team =

American college football season

2010 Arkansas State Red Wolves football
- Conference: Sun Belt Conference
- Record: 4–8 (4–4 Sun Belt)
- Head coach: Steve Roberts (9th season)
- Offensive coordinator: Hugh Freeze (1st season)
- Offensive scheme: Spread
- Defensive coordinator: Kevin Corless (9th season)
- Base defense: 4–3
- Home stadium: ASU Stadium

2010 Sun Belt Conference football standings
	Conf.			Overall
Team	W		L	W		L
Troy +	6	–	2	8	–	5
FIU +	6	–	2	7	–	6
Middle Tennessee	5	–	3	6	–	7
Louisiana–Monroe	4	–	4	5	–	7
Arkansas State	4	–	4	4	–	8
Florida Atlantic	3	–	5	4	–	8
Louisiana–Lafayette	3	–	5	3	–	9
North Texas	3	–	5	3	–	9
Western Kentucky	2	–	6	2	–	10
+ – Conference co-champions

The 2010 Arkansas State Red Wolves football team represented Arkansas State University as a member of the Sun Belt Conference during the 2010 NCAA Division I FBS football season. Led by Steve Roberts in his ninth and final season as head coach, the Red Wolves compiled an overall record of 4–8 with a mark of 4–4 in conference play, tying for fourth place in the Sun Belt. Arkansas State played home games at ASU Stadium in Jonesboro, Arkansas. Roberts was fired at the end of the season.

== Schedule ==
Date	Time	Opponent	Site	TV	Result	Attendance
September 4	6:00 p.m.	at No. 23 Auburn*	Jordan–Hare Stadium; Auburn, AL	FSS	L 26–52	83,441
September 11	2:30 p.m.	at Louisiana–Lafayette	Cajun Field; Lafayette, LA	CST/CSS	L 24–31	15,103
September 18	7:00 p.m.	Louisiana–Monroe	ASU Stadium; Jonesboro, AR	CST/CSS	W 34–20	23,176
September 25	2:30 p.m.	at Troy	Veterans Memorial Stadium; Troy, AL	CST/CSS	L 28–35	16,320
October 2	6:00 p.m.	Louisville*^{†}	ASU Stadium; Jonesboro, AR	ESPN3	L 24–34	25,219
October 9	6:00 p.m.	at North Texas	Fouts Field; Denton, TX		W 24–19	14,589
October 16	11:00 a.m.	at Indiana*	Memorial Stadium; Bloomington, IN	ESPNU	L 34–36	40,480
October 23	12:00 p.m.	Florida Atlantic	ASU Stadium; Jonesboro, AR	CST/CSS	W 37–16	13,159
November 2	6:00 p.m.	Middle Tennessee	ASU Stadium; Jonesboro, AR	ESPN2	W 51–24	13,589
November 13	2:00 p.m.	Western Kentucky	ASU Stadium; Jonesboro, AR		L 35–36 ^{OT}	11,826
November 20	2:30 p.m.	at Navy*	Navy–Marine Corps Memorial Stadium; Annapolis, MD	CBSCS	L 19–35	27,501
November 27	2:30 p.m.	at FIU	FIU Stadium; Miami, FL	CST/CSS	L 24–31	14,588
*Non-conference game; ^{†}Homecoming; Rankings from AP Poll released prior to the game; All times are in Central time

== NFL draft ==
7th round, 214th overall pick by the Houston Texans—Sr. OT Derek Newton
