= 1966 Jacksonville State Gamecocks football team =

American college football season

1966 Jacksonville State Gamecocks football

ACC champion

Space City Classic, W 41–30 vs. Arkansas A&M
- Conference: Alabama Collegiate Conference
- Record: 8–2 (3–0 ACC)
- Head coach: Jim Blevins (2nd season)
- Home stadium: Paul Snow Stadium

1966 Alabama Collegiate Conference football standings
	Conf.					Overall
Team	W		L		T	W		L		T
Jacksonville State $	3	–	0	–	0	8	–	2	–	0
Florence State	2	–	1	–	0	4	–	4	–	1
Troy State	1	–	2	–	0	5	–	5	–	0
Livingston State	0	–	3	–	0	3	–	6	–	0
$ – Conference champion

The 1966 Jacksonville State Gamecocks football team represented Jacksonville State College (now known as Jacksonville State University) as a member of the Alabama Collegiate Conference (ACC) during the 1966 NAIA football season. Led by second-year head coach Jim Blevins, the Gamecocks compiled an overall record of 8–2 with a mark of 3–0 in conference play, and finished as ACC champion.

== Schedule ==
Date	Opponent	Site	Result	Source
September 17	Florence State	Paul Snow Stadium; Jacksonville, AL	W 21–0	
September 24	at Samford*	Seibert Stadium; Homewood, AL (rivalry)	L 14–28	
October 1	Carson–Newman*	Paul Snow Stadium; Jacksonville, AL	W 40–13	
October 8	Texas Lutheran*	Paul Snow Stadium; Jacksonville, AL	W 21–3	
October 15	Troy State	Paul Snow Stadium; Jacksonville, AL (rivalry)	W 27–6	
October 22	at Mississippi College*	Robinson Field; Clinton, MS	W 17–0	
October 29	at Chattanooga*	Chamberlain Field; Chattanooga, TN	W 19–10	
November 5	at Delta State*	Delta Field; Cleveland, MS	L 10–23	
November 12	Livingston State	Paul Snow Stadium; Jacksonville, AL	W 24–14	
November 24	vs. Arkansas A&M*	Huntsville Stadium; Huntsville, AL (Space City Classic)	W 41–30	
*Non-conference game
