= Billy Atkins (American football) =

American football player and coach (1934–1991)

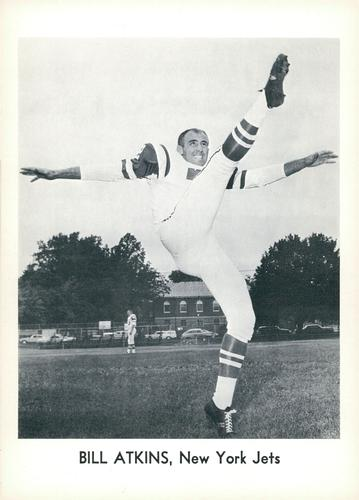
- Atkins in 1963

No. 29, 20, 2, 28
- Positions: Safety, punter

Personal information
- Born: November 19, 1934; Millport, Alabama, U.S.
- Died: November 5, 1991 (aged 56); El Paso, Texas, U.S.
- Listed height: 6 ft 1 in (1.85 m)
- Listed weight: 196 lb (89 kg)

Career information
- High school: Millport
- College: Auburn
- NFL draft: 1958: 5th round, 59th overall pick

Career history

Playing
- San Francisco 49ers (1958–1959); Buffalo Bills (1960–1961); New York Titans / Jets (1962–1963); Buffalo Bills (1963); Denver Broncos (1964)

Coaching
- Troy State (1966–1971) Head coach; Buffalo Bills (1972–1975) Defensive backs; San Francisco 49ers (1976) Defensive secondary; Detroit Lions (1978–1979) Defensive backs; St. Louis Cardinals (1980–1981) Defensive backs

Operations
- Troy State (1969–1972) Athletic director

Awards and highlights
- As a player: First-team All-AFL (1961); AFL All-Star (1961); 2× AFL punting yards leader (1960, 1961); National champion (1957); Second-team All-SEC (1957); As a coach: NAIA national champion (1968); NAIA Coach of the Year (1968); Alabama Sports Hall of Fame; Troy University Sports Hall of Fame

Career AFL/NFL statistics
- Punts: 221
- Punting yards: 9,203
- Punting average: 41.6
- Longest punt: 70
- Interceptions: 20
- Interception yards: 217
- Total touchdowns: 1
- Stats at Pro Football Reference

Head coaching record
- Career: 44–16–2 (.726)

William Ellis "Ace" Atkins (November 19, 1934 – November 5, 1991) was an American professional football player who was a safety and punter for the San Francisco 49ers in the National Football League (NFL), and in the American Football League (AFL) for the Buffalo Bills, New York Titans / Jets and Denver Broncos. In 1961, he was an AFL All-Star. He played college football for the Auburn Tigers.

== Head coaching career ==
On January 8, 1966, Atkins was named the head coach of the Troy State Trojans football team. Two years later, he coached Troy State to an NAIA National Championship and was named the NAIA Coach of the Year. Atkins finished at Troy State with a 44–16–2 record before leaving in 1971. He is the second winningest coach in school history behind only Larry Blakeney.

== Personal life ==
Atkins' son, author William Ellis "Ace" Atkins Jr., also played football at Auburn and was member of the 1993 undefeated team.

== Head coaching record ==
Year	Team	Overall	Conference	Standing	Bowl/playoffs
Troy State Trojans (Alabama Collegiate Conference) (1966–1969)
1966	Troy State	5–5	1–2	3rd	
1967	Troy State	8–2	3–0	1st	
1968	Troy State	11–1	3–0	1st	W NAIA Championship
1969	Troy State	8–1–1	3–0	1st	
Troy State Trojans (Mid-South Athletic Conference / Gulf South Conference) (1970–1971)
1970	Troy State	6–4–1	3–2	3rd	
1971	Troy State	6–3	5–1	T–1st	
Troy State:		44–16–2	18–5		
Total:		44–16–2			
National championship Conference title Conference division title or championship game berth

== See also ==
- List of American Football League players
