= Justice Hansen (American football) =

American gridiron football player (born 1995)

Profile
- Position: Quarterback

Personal information
- Born: January 7, 1995 (age 31); Edmond, Oklahoma, U.S.
- Listed height: 6 ft 4 in (1.93 m)
- Listed weight: 218 lb (99 kg)

Career information
- High school: Edmond Santa Fe
- College: Oklahoma (2014); Butler (KS) (2015); Arkansas State (2016–2018)
- NFL draft: 2019: undrafted

Career history
- Saskatchewan Roughriders (2020–2021)*; Panthers Wrocław (2022)
- * Offseason or practice squad member only

Awards and highlights
- Sun Belt Player of the Year (2018); Sun Belt Offensive Player of the Year (2017); 2× First-team All-Sun Belt (2017, 2018)

Justice Hansen (born January 7, 1995) is an American former football quarterback. He played college football for the Butler (KS) Grizzlies and the Arkansas State Red Wolves.

== Early life ==
Hansen attended the Edmond Santa Fe High School in Edmond, Oklahoma. He committed to the University of Oklahoma to play college football.

== College career ==
Hansen redshirted his only season at Oklahoma in 2014.

In 2015, as a redshirt freshman, he transferred to Butler Community College. In his only year at Butler he played in nine games, completing 163 of 211 passes for 1,694 yards and 12 touchdowns. After the 2015 season, Hansen transferred to Arkansas State University.

In 2016, as a redshirt sophomore, he began his career at Arkansas State. He began as the backup to starting quarterback Chad Voytik, but later took over as the starter after the first game of the season and completed 197 of 340 passes for 2,719 yards with 19 touchdowns and eight interceptions.

In 2017, as a redshirt junior, he completed 305 of 487 passes for 3,967 yards, 37 touchdowns and 16 interceptions.He had problems with turnovers, as he threw 4 interceptions in a 43-25 win at Georgia Southern and a 24-19 loss at South Alabama.

In 2018, as a redshirt senior, he led Arkansas State to an 8-5 record, completed 286 of 434 passes for 3,447 yards, 27 touchdowns and 9 interceptions, and was named the Sun Belt Player of the Year, but he had a couple bad performances, throwing for three interceptions in losses to Appalachian State, 35-9 at home, and Nevada, 16-13, in the 2018 Arizona Bowl.

== Professional career ==
In May 2019, after going undrafted in the 2019 NFL draft, he attended the Los Angeles Chargers 2019 rookie minicamp but did not get offered a contract.

On December 23, 2019, he signed with the Saskatchewan Roughriders of the Canadian Football League (CFL). He was released on February 19, 2021.

In November 2021, he was signed by Panthers Wrocław of the European League of Football (ELF) for the 2022 season.
