= 1967 Jacksonville State Gamecocks football team =

American college football season

1967 Jacksonville State Gamecocks football
- Conference: Alabama Collegiate Conference
- Record: 4–5–1 (1–1–1 ACC)
- Head coach: Jim Blevins (3rd season)
- Home stadium: Paul Snow Stadium

1967 Alabama Collegiate Conference football standings
| | Conf. | | | | | Overall |
| Team | W | | L | | T | W | | L | | T |
|---|---|---|---|---|---|---|---|---|---|---|
| Troy State $ | 3 | – | 0 | – | 0 | 8 | – | 2 | – | 0 |
| Jacksonville State | 1 | – | 1 | – | 1 | 4 | – | 5 | – | 1 |
| Florence State | 1 | – | 2 | – | 0 | 2 | – | 6 | – | 1 |
| Livingston | 0 | – | 2 | – | 1 | 4 | – | 5 | – | 1 |
$ – Conference champion

The 1967 Jacksonville State Gamecocks football team represented Jacksonville State University as a member of the Alabama Collegiate Conference (ACC) during the 1967 NAIA football season. Led by third-year head coach Jim Blevins, the Gamecocks compiled an overall record of 4–5–1 with a mark of 1–1–1 in conference play, placing second in the ACC.

== Schedule ==
| Date | Opponent | Site | Result | Attendance | Source |
|---|---|---|---|---|---|
| September 16 | at Florence State | Municipal Stadium; Florence, AL | W 23–14 | | |
| September 23 | Samford* | Paul Snow Stadium; Jacksonville, AL (rivalry) | L 13–20 | | |
| September 30 | at Carson–Newman* | Burke–Tarr Stadium; Jefferson City, TN | L 13–23 | | |
| October 7 | Tennessee–Martin* | Paul Snow Stadium; Jacksonville, AL | L 0–38 | | |
| October 14 | at Troy State | Veterans Memorial Stadium; Troy, AL (rivalry) | L 0–46 | | |
| October 21 | at Newberry* | Setzler Field; Newberry, SC | W 35–6 | | |
| October 28 | Louisiana College* | Paul Snow Stadium; Jacksonville, AL | W 23–10 | | |
| November 4 | Delta State* | Paul Snow Stadium; Jacksonville, AL | W 25–21 | | |
| November 11 | at Livingston | Tiger Stadium; Livingston, AL | T 7–7 | | |
| November 18 | at Chattanooga* | Chamberlain Field; Chattanooga, TN | L 0–51 | 6,500 | |
*Non-conference game
