= 1985 Jacksonville State Gamecocks football team =

American college football season

1985 Jacksonville State Gamecocks football
- Conference: Gulf South Conference
- Record: 3–6–1 (3–5 GSC)
- Head coach: Bill Burgess (1st season)
- Offensive coordinator: Charles Maniscalco (1st season)
- Home stadium: Paul Snow Stadium

1985 Gulf South Conference football standings
	Conf.					Overall
Team	W		L		T	W		L		T
No. 2 North Alabama $^	7	–	1	–	0	12	–	2	–	0
No. 17 Mississippi College	6	–	1	–	1	7	–	2	–	1
Troy State	6	–	2	–	0	6	–	4	–	0
Livingston	4	–	4	–	0	6	–	5	–	0
Delta State	3	–	4	–	1	4	–	6	–	1
Jacksonville State	3	–	5	–	0	3	–	6	–	1
Valdosta State	3	–	5	–	0	5	–	6	–	0
West Georgia	3	–	5	–	0	5	–	5	–	0
Tennessee–Martin	0	–	8	–	0	1	–	10	–	0
$ – Conference champion; ^ – NCAA Division II playoff participant; Rankings from NCAA Division II Football Committee poll

The 1985 Jacksonville State Gamecocks football team represented Jacksonville State University as a member of the Gulf South Conference (GSC) during the 1985 NCAA Division II football season. Led by first-year head coach Bill Burgess, the Gamecocks compiled an overall record of 3–6–1 with a mark of 3–5 in conference play, and finished tied for sixth in the GSC.

== Schedule ==
Date	Opponent	Site	Result	Attendance	Source
September 14	Alabama A&M*	Paul Snow Stadium; Jacksonville, AL	T 24–24	13,500	
September 21	at Middle Tennessee*	Johnny "Red" Floyd Stadium; Murfreesboro, TN	L 21–55	10,200	
September 28	at West Georgia	Grisham Stadium; Carrollton, GA	W 35–14	8,000	
October 5	Valdosta State	Paul Snow Stadium; Jacksonville, AL	W 12–10	7,000	
October 12	at No. T–11 Mississippi College	Robinson Field; Clinton, MS	L 3–50	4,200	
October 19	Delta State	Paul Snow Stadium; Jacksonville, AL	L 23–27	4,500	
October 26	at No. 11 North Alabama	Braly Municipal Stadium; Florence, AL	L 10–23	6,400	
November 2	Tennessee–Martin	Paul Snow Stadium; Jacksonville, AL	W 19–13	8,000	
November 16	at Troy State	Veterans Memorial Stadium; Troy, AL (rivalry)	L 14–31	7,500	
November 23	Livingston	Paul Snow Stadium; Jacksonville, AL	L 24–27	5,000	
*Non-conference game; Rankings from NCAA Division II Football Committee Poll released prior to the game
