= 1985 Troy State Trojans football team =

American college football season

1985 Troy State Trojans football
- Conference: Gulf South Conference
- Record: 6–4 (6–2 GSC)
- Head coach: Rick Rhoades (1st season)
- Offensive coordinator: Jay Jefcoat (2nd season)
- Offensive scheme: Wishbone
- Defensive coordinator: Robert Maddox (1st season)
- Home stadium: Veterans Memorial Stadium

1985 Gulf South Conference football standings
	Conf.					Overall
Team	W		L		T	W		L		T
No. 2 North Alabama $^	7	–	1	–	0	12	–	2	–	0
No. 17 Mississippi College	6	–	1	–	1	7	–	2	–	1
Troy State	6	–	2	–	0	6	–	4	–	0
Livingston	4	–	4	–	0	6	–	5	–	0
Delta State	3	–	4	–	1	4	–	6	–	1
Jacksonville State	3	–	5	–	0	3	–	6	–	1
Valdosta State	3	–	5	–	0	5	–	6	–	0
West Georgia	3	–	5	–	0	5	–	5	–	0
Tennessee–Martin	0	–	8	–	0	1	–	10	–	0
$ – Conference champion; ^ – NCAA Division II playoff participant; Rankings from NCAA Division II Football Committee poll

The 1985 Troy State Trojans football team represented Troy State University (now known as Troy University) as a member of the Gulf South Conference (GSC) during the 1985 NCAA Division II football season. Led by first-year head coach Rick Rhoades, the Trojans compiled an overall record of 6–4, with a mark of 6–2 in conference play, and finished third in the GSC.

== Schedule ==
Date	Opponent	Rank	Site	Result	Attendance	Source
September 14	at Nicholls State*	No. 10	John L. Guidry Stadium; Thibodaux, LA	L 22–40	8,115	
September 21	Georgia Southern*		Veterans Memorial Stadium; Troy, AL	L 10–17	7,000	
September 28	at No. 13 Livingston		Tiger Stadium; Livingston, AL	W 38–7	6,500	
October 5	West Georgia		Veterans Memorial Stadium; Troy, AL	W 42–0	8,600	
October 12	at Valdosta State		Cleveland Field; Valdosta, GA	W 10–3	7,500	
October 19	No. T–8 Mississippi College		Rip Hewes Stadium; Dothan, AL	L 21–45	5,000	
October 26	at Delta State		Delta Field; Cleveland, MS	W 31–7	1,500	
November 2	No. 11 North Alabama		Veterans Memorial Stadium; Troy, AL	L 7–9	3,700	
November 9	at Tennessee–Martin		Pacer Stadium; Martin, TN	W 44–19	350	
November 16	Jacksonville State		Veterans Memorial Stadium; Troy, AL (rivalry)	W 31–14	7,500	
*Non-conference game; Rankings from NCAA Division II Football Committee Poll released prior to the game
