= 2010 New Orleans Bowl =

2010 R+L Carriers New Orleans Bowl
Ohio Bobcats	Troy Trojans
(8–4)	(7–5)
MAC	Sun Belt
21	48
Head coach: Frank Solich	Head coach: Larry Blakeney
	1	2	3	4	Total
Ohio	7	0	7	7	21
Troy	14	24	10	0	48
- Date: December 18, 2010
- Season: 2010
- Stadium: Louisiana Superdome
- Location: New Orleans, Louisiana
- MVP: QB Corey Robinson
- Favorite: Troy by 3
- Referee: Steve Barth (C-USA)
- Attendance: 29,159
- Payout: US$325,000 per team

United States TV coverage
- Network: ESPN
- Announcers: Mark Neely, Robert Smith and Quint Kessenich
- Nielsen ratings: 1.3 / 2.09M

The 2010 New Orleans Bowl was the tenth edition of the New Orleans Bowl. The game was played at the Louisiana Superdome in New Orleans, Louisiana, on Saturday, December 18, 2010, at 9 p.m. Eastern Time. The contest was televised live on ESPN. The game featured the Ohio Bobcats of the Mid-American Conference versus the Troy Trojans from the Sun Belt Conference. Sponsored by R+L Carriers, the game was officially known as the R+L Carriers New Orleans Bowl.

== Teams ==
=== Ohio Bobcats ===
The Bobcats entered the New Orleans Bowl with a record of 8–4. The team was 1 win away from playing in the MAC Championship game before losing their final game of the season to Kent State. Ohio made its first appearance in the New Orleans Bowl. The Bobcats appeared in their 3rd bowl game under head coach Frank Solich, however they were 0–2 in the two prior games, and Ohio had never won a bowl game in school history in four attempts. They were a 21–17 loser to Marshall in the 2009 Little Caesars Pizza Bowl.

=== Troy Trojans ===
Troy entered the bowl game with a 7–5 overall record and won a share of the Sun Belt Conference Championship. The Trojans played in their third straight bowl game. This will also mark the third time in five seasons that Troy will be playing in the New Orleans Bowl. They are currently 1–1 in New Orleans Bowl games with a win over Rice in 2006 and a loss to Southern Miss in 2008. Last season Troy was defeated by Central Michigan by a score of 44–41 in the GMAC Bowl.

== Scoring summary ==
Scoring summary

Quarter	Time	Drive			Team	Scoring information	Score	
Quarter	Time	Plays	Yards	TOP	Team	Scoring information	Ohio	Troy
1	9:52	10	78	4:12	Troy	Jerrel Jernigan 12-yard touchdown run, Michael Taylor kick good	0	7
1	4:59	8	81	4:53	Ohio	Steven Goulet 34-yard touchdown reception from Boo Jackson, Matt Weller kick good	7	7
1	1:57	8	76	3:02	Troy	Tebiarus Gill 31-yard touchdown reception from Corey Robinson, Michael Taylor kick good	7	14
2	12:42	7	66	2:11	Troy	Jerrel Jernigan 16-yard touchdown reception from Corey Robinson, Michael Taylor kick good	7	21
2	8:33	6	36	1:50	Troy	50-yard field goal by Michael Taylor	7	24
2	2:56	8	80	3:54	Troy	Tebiarus Gill 17-yard touchdown reception from Corey Robinson, Michael Taylor kick good	7	31
2	0:36	6	55	0:57	Troy	Tebiarus Gill 26-yard touchdown reception from Corey Robinson, Michael Taylor kick good	7	38
3	11:58	10	48	3:02	Troy	33-yard field goal by Michael Taylor	7	41
3	8:31	8	93	3:27	Ohio	Donte Foster 5-yard touchdown reception from Boo Jackson, Matt Weller kick good	14	41
3	6:36	6	83	1:55	Troy	DuJuan Harris 2-yard touchdown run, Michael Taylor kick good	14	48
4	5:07	9	54	5:40	Ohio	Riley Dunlop 18-yard touchdown reception from Boo Jackson, Matt Weller kick good	21	48
"TOP" = time of possession. For other American football terms, see Glossary of American football.							21	48

=== Statistics ===
Statistics	Ohio	Troy
First downs	14	30
Rushes-yards (net)	30-99	33-220
Passing yards (net)	209	382
Passes, Att-Comp-Int	22-14-2	43-33-0
Total offense, plays - yards	52-308	76-602
Time of Possession	29:57	30:03

== Notes ==
The 2010 New Orleans Bowl marked the first time that the 2 schools played each other in the history of their programs.
