= 1966 Troy State Red Wave football team =

American college football season

1966 Troy State Red Wave football
- Conference: Alabama Collegiate Conference
- Record: 5–5 (1–2 ACC)
- Head coach: Billy Atkins (1st season)
- Home stadium: Veterans Memorial Stadium

1966 Alabama Collegiate Conference football standings
	Conf.					Overall
Team	W		L		T	W		L		T
Jacksonville State $	3	–	0	–	0	8	–	2	–	0
Florence State	2	–	1	–	0	4	–	4	–	1
Troy State	1	–	2	–	0	5	–	5	–	0
Livingston State	0	–	3	–	0	3	–	6	–	0
$ – Conference champion

The 1966 Troy State Red Wave football team represented Troy State College (now known as Troy University) as a member of the Alabama Collegiate Conference (ACC) during the 1966 NAIA football season. Led by first-year head coach Billy Atkins, the Red Wave compiled an overall record of 5–5 with a mark of 1–2 in conference play, placing third in the ACC.

== Schedule ==
Date	Opponent	Site	Result	Attendance	Source
September 10	Gordon Military College*	Veterans Memorial Stadium; Troy, AL	W 48–7		
September 17	at Samford*	Seibert Stadium; Homewood, AL	L 13–14		
September 24	Livingston State	Veterans Memorial Stadium; Troy, AL	W 37–28		
October 1	Arkansas State Teachers*	Veterans Memorial Stadium; Troy, AL	W 41–7		
October 8	Delta State*	Matthews Stadium; Ozark, AL	W 20–16		
October 15	at Jacksonville State	Paul Snow Stadium; Jacksonville, AL (rivalry)	L 6–27		
October 22	at Florence State	Braly Municipal Stadium; Florence, AL	L 34–35		
October 29	Northwestern State*	Veterans Memorial Stadium; Troy, AL	L 7–14	8,000	
November 5	at Tennessee–Martin*	Pacer Stadium; Martin, TN	L 7–30	7,500	
November 12	at Louisiana College*	Alumni Stadium; Pineville, LA	W 16–7	3,000	
*Non-conference game
