= 1969 Troy State Red Wave football team =

American college football season

1969 Troy State Red Wave football

ACC champion
- Conference: Alabama Collegiate Conference
- Record: 8–1–1 (3–0 ACC)
- Head coach: Billy Atkins (4th season)
- Home stadium: Veterans Memorial Stadium

The 1969 Troy State Red Wave football team represented Troy State University (now known as Troy University) as a member of the Alabama Collegiate Conference (ACC) during the 1969 NAIA football season. Led by fourth-year head coach Billy Atkins, the Red Wave compiled an overall record of 8–1–1 with a mark of 3–0 in conference play, winning the ACC title.

== Schedule ==
Date	Opponent	Rank	Site	Result	Attendance	Source
September 13	vs. Samford*		Rip Hewes Stadium; Dothan, AL	W 35–7		
September 20	at Austin Peay*		Municipal Stadium; Clarksville, TN	T 16–16		
September 27	vs. Livingston	No. 15	Cramton Bowl; Montgomery, AL	W 30–14		
October 4	at Sam Houston State*	No. 17	Pritchett Field; Huntsville, TX	W 24–14		
October 11	at Delta State*		Delta Field; Cleveland, MS	W 42–7		
October 18	Jacksonville State		Veterans Memorial Stadium; Troy, AL (rivalry)	W 37–6		
October 25	Florence State	No. 20	Veterans Memorial Stadium; Troy, AL	W 31–10		
November 1	at McNeese State*	No. 13	Cowboy Stadium; Lake Charles, LA	L 14–17	10,000	
November 8	Tennessee–Martin*		Veterans Memorial Stadium; Troy, AL	W 23–13		
November 15	at Chattanooga*		Chamberlain Field; Chattanooga, TN	W 31–6		
*Non-conference game; Rankings from AP Poll released prior to the game
