= Larry Blakeney =

American football player and coach (born 1947)

Biographical details
- Born: September 21, 1947 (age 79); Birmingham, Alabama, U.S.

Playing career
- 1966–1969: Auburn
- Position: Quarterback

Coaching career (HC unless noted)
- 1970–1971: Southern Academy (AL)
- 1972–1974: Walker HS (AL)
- 1975–1976: Vestavia Hills HS (AL)
- 1977–1990: Auburn (assistant)
- 1991–2014: Troy

Head coaching record
- Overall: 178–113–1 (college); 50–24–2 (high school)
- Bowls: 2–3
- Tournaments: 5–7 (NCAA D-I-AA playoffs)

Accomplishments and honors

Championships
- 3 Southland (1996, 1999–2000); 5 Sun Belt (2006–2010)

Awards
- 2× AFCA Regional Coach of the Year (1999-2000); 2× Southland Coach of the Year (1999–2000); 2× Sun Belt Coach of the Year (2008–2009); Sun Belt 10th Anniversary Most Outstanding Coach; Johnny Vaught Lifetime Achievement Award; Camellia Bowl Alabama Football Legend Award (2019); Alabama Sports Hall of Fame; Wiregrass Sports Hall of Fame; Troy Sports Hall of Fame
- College Football Hall of Fame; Inducted in 2025 (profile)

Larry Blakeney (born September 21, 1947) is an American former football player and coach. He served as the head football coach at Troy University from 1991 to 2014, compiling a record of 178–113–1 in 24 seasons. He is one of only two coaches to have taken a college football program from NCAA Division II to the NCAA Division I Football Bowl Subdivision, the other being UCF's Gene McDowell.

Blakeney was the recipient of the Johnny Vaught Lifetime Achievement Award by the All-American Football Foundation in 2000. He was inducted into the Wiregrass Sports Hall of Fame in 2008 and was inducted into the Alabama Sports Hall of Fame on May 30, 2009. On December 21, 2010, he received the Sun Belt Conference 10th Anniversary Most Outstanding Head Coach award.

In the spring of 2011, Troy University honored Blakeney by naming the football playing surface Larry Blakeney Field at Veterans Memorial Stadium. On August 10, 2012, Blakeney was inducted into the Troy University Sports Hall of Fame. He was part of the inaugural class along with DeMarcus Ware, Don Maestri, Chase Riddle, Bill Atkins, Sim Byrd, Denise Monroe, Vergil McKinley, Ralph Adams, Mike Turk, and Charles Oliver. Blakeney was inducted into the College Football Hall of Fame in 2025.

== Playing career ==
Blakeney was the first sophomore to start at quarterback for Ralph Jordan at Auburn. A three-year letterman, he started eight games in 1966, scoring five touchdowns in his first four games. Blakeney lost the starting job in 1967, however, and moved to the defensive backfield in 1968. He missed the entire season with a shoulder injury, but resumed play in 1969 as Auburn posted an 8–3 record. He lettered twice in baseball, in 1968 and 1969. Blakeney graduated in 1970 with a bachelor's degree in business administration.

== Coaching career ==
Blakeney became a head coach at three high schools after graduation: Southern Academy (1970–71), Walker High School (1972–74) and Vestavia Hills High School (1975–76). He compiled a 50–24–2 record as a high school head coach.

He was hired on at his alma mater, Auburn, in 1977 as the offensive line assistant coach. In 1979, he was the tight end and wide receivers coach for two years and then just wide receivers from 1981 to 1990. He added on the offensive play calling duties in 1986. During the 14 seasons at Auburn, the Tigers were 110–50–3 and won four Southeastern Conference championships and were 6–2–1 in bowl games.

=== Troy ===
Blakeney became the 20th head football coach at what was then known as Troy State University on December 3, 1990—the school did not become Troy University until 2004. The Troy State Trojans were still an NCAA Division II program, but were approved to transition to NCAA Division I-AA the following season. Blakeney took over a program that had won NCAA Division II Football Championships in 1984 and 1987, but was 13–17 the previous three years.

The first full year at Division I-AA, the Trojans made it to the semifinal game and finished 12–1–1, 10–0–1 in the regular season. This marked the first undefeated regular, full season Troy State football and they finished ranked first in the end of season poll by Sports Network. In 1995, the team improved on that record finishing 11–0 in the regular season for the first undefeated and untied season in history. During the eight seasons the team was a member of I-AA football, they made the playoffs seven seasons and won the Southland Conference championship three times and made the playoff semifinals twice.

Troy State transitioned to Division I-A in 2001. During that season they defeated three Division I-A schools, including their first win over a BCS conference school, Mississippi State. The transition made Blakeney one of two coaches to ever take a football team from Division II to I-A—the other is UCF's Gene McDowell.

In 2004, Troy's first year in the Sun Belt Conference, Blakeney coached his team to one of the biggest victories in the school's and the Sun Belt's history after defeating then #17 ranked Missouri, 24–14, at home, in front of a national audience on ESPN2. He once again coached his team to a victory over a BCS school in 2007 at home, routing Oklahoma State 41–23.

Blakeney earned his first bowl game win in 2006, beating the Rice Owls, 41–17, in the New Orleans Bowl. The team won their first Sun Belt Conference title that year. After losing the 2008 New Orleans Bowl in overtime against Southern Miss and the 2010 GMAC Bowl in double-overtime against Central Michigan, Blakeney earned his second bowl victory in the 2010 New Orleans Bowl, defeating Ohio, 48–21.

ESPN recognized Blakeney as one of the top five non-AQ recruiting closers in 2009. Blakeney retired at the end of the 2014 season after serving 24 years as head coach at Troy.

== Personal ==
Blakeney is married to the former Janice Powell and they have three daughters, Kelley, and twins Julie and Tiffany. All three daughters graduated from Troy. Tiffany is married and lives in Atlanta, Georgia with her husband Jason Rash and two daughters, Madeline Ann Rash and Danielle Avery Rash.

== Head coaching record ==
=== College ===
Year	Team	Overall	Conference	Standing	Bowl/playoffs	TSN^{#}	USA/ESPN^{°}
Troy State Trojans (NCAA Division II independent) (1991–1992)
1991	Troy State	5–6					
1992	Troy State	10–1					
Troy State Trojans (NCAA Division I-AA independent) (1993–1995)
1993	Troy State	12–1–1			L NCAA Division I-AA Semifinal	1	
1994	Troy State	8–4			L NCAA Division I-AA First Round	10	
1995	Troy State	11–1			L NCAA Division I-AA First Round	3	
Troy State Trojans (Southland Conference) (1996–2000)
1996	Troy State	12–2	5–1	1st	L NCAA Division I-AA Semifinal	5	
1997	Troy State	5–6	2–5	T–6th			
1998	Troy State	8–4	5–2	T–2nd	L NCAA Division I-AA First Round	13	11
1999	Troy State	11–2	6–1	T–1st	L NCAA Division I-AA Quarterfinal	6	6
2000	Troy State	9–3	7–0	1st	L NCAA Division I-AA First Round	9	3
Troy State Trojans (NCAA Division I-AA independent) (2001)
2001	Troy State	7–4					
Troy State Trojans (NCAA Division I-A independent) (2002–2003)
2002	Troy State	4–8					
2003	Troy State	6–6					
Troy State/Troy Trojans (Sun Belt Conference) (2004–2014)
2004	Troy State	7–5	5–2	2nd	L Silicon Valley		
2005	Troy	4–7	3–4	5th			
2006	Troy	8–5	6–1	T–1st	W New Orleans		
2007	Troy	8–4	6–1	T–1st			
2008	Troy	8–5	6–1	1st	L New Orleans		
2009	Troy	9–4	8–0	1st	L GMAC		
2010	Troy	8–5	6–2	T–1st	W New Orleans		
2011	Troy	3–9	2–6	7th			
2012	Troy	5–7	3–5	6th			
2013	Troy	6–6	4–3	2nd			
2014	Troy	3–9	3–5	T–7th			
Troy State / Troy:		178–113–1	77–39				
Total:		178–113–1					
National championship Conference title Conference division title or championship game berth
^{#}Rankings from final Sports Network Poll. °Rankings from final USA Today/ESPN Poll..
