= 2012 Troy Trojans football team =

American college football season

2012 Troy Trojans football
- Conference: Sun Belt Conference
- Record: 5–7 (3–5 Sun Belt)
- Head coach: Larry Blakeney (22nd season)
- Offensive coordinator: Kenny Edenfield (3rd season)
- Defensive coordinator: Jeremy Rowell (7th season)
- Home stadium: Veterans Memorial Stadium

2012 Sun Belt Conference football standings
	Conf.			Overall
Team	W		L	W		L
Arkansas State $	7	–	1	10	–	3
Louisiana–Monroe	6	–	2	8	–	5
Middle Tennessee	6	–	2	8	–	4
Louisiana–Lafayette *	4	–	2	5	–	4
Western Kentucky	4	–	4	7	–	6
Troy	3	–	5	5	–	7
North Texas	3	–	5	4	–	8
Florida Atlantic	2	–	6	3	–	9
FIU	2	–	6	3	–	9
South Alabama **	1	–	7	2	–	11
$ – Conference champion; * – Louisiana–Lafayette vacated 4 wins due to NCAA violations. ** – South Alabama was ineligible for the conference title or a bowl game as part of their transition to the FBS.

The 2012 Troy Trojans football team represented Troy University during the 2012 NCAA Division I FBS football season. They were led by 22nd-year head coach Larry Blakeney and played their home games at Veterans Memorial Stadium. They were a member of the Sun Belt Conference. They finished the season 5–7, 3–5 in Sun Belt play to finish in a tie for sixth place.

== Schedule ==
Date	Time	Opponent	Site	TV	Result	Attendance
September 1	11:00 am	at UAB*	Legion Field; Birmingham, AL	FCS	W 39–29	28,612
September 8	6:00 pm	Louisiana	Veterans Memorial Stadium; Troy, AL	ESPN3	L 24–37	17,981
September 15	6:00 pm	Mississippi State*	Veterans Memorial Stadium; Troy, AL	ESPN3	L 24–30	29,013
September 22	6:00 pm	at North Texas	Apogee Stadium; Denton, TX	ESPN3	W 14–7	21,823
September 29	2:30 pm	at South Alabama	Ladd–Peebles Stadium; Mobile, AL (rivalry)	SBN/CSS	W 31–10	23,789
October 11	6:30 pm	Western Kentucky	Veterans Memorial Stadium; Troy, AL	ESPNU	L 26–31	16,426
October 20	12:00 pm	FIU	Veterans Memorial Stadium; Troy, AL	SBN	W 38–37	17,354
October 27	4:00 pm	at Florida Atlantic	FAU Stadium; Boca Raton, FL		L 27–34	11,968
November 3	11:00 am	at Tennessee*	Neyland Stadium; Knoxville, TN	SECRN	L 48–55	84,189
November 10	2:30 pm	Navy*	Veterans Memorial Stadium; Troy, AL (College GameDay)	ESPN3	W 41–31	24,321
November 17	2:30 pm	Arkansas State^{†}	Veterans Memorial Stadium; Troy, AL	Troy/IMGSN	L 34–41	20,614
November 24	2:30 pm	at Middle Tennessee	Johnny "Red" Floyd Stadium; Murfreesboro, TN (Battle for the Palladium)	ESPN3	L 21–24	18,605
*Non-conference game; ^{†}Homecoming; All times are in Central time

== Game summaries ==
=== @ UAB ===
	1	2	3	4	Total
Trojans	10	7	15	7	39
Blazers	0	7	16	6	29

=== Louisiana–Lafayette ===
	1	2	3	4	Total
Ragin' Cajuns	14	6	10	7	37
Trojans	7	7	3	7	24

=== Mississippi State ===
	1	2	3	4	Total
Bulldogs	10	13	0	7	30
Trojans	7	0	7	10	24

=== @ North Texas ===
	1	2	3	4	Total
Trojans	0	7	7	0	14
Mean Green	7	0	0	0	7

=== @ South Alabama ===
	1	2	3	4	Total
Trojans	10	14	0	7	31
Jaguars	7	3	0	0	10

=== WKU ===
	1	2	3	4	Total
Hilltoppers	7	7	14	3	31
Trojans	10	7	9	0	26

=== FIU ===
	1	2	3	4	Total
Panthers	21	3	13	0	37
Trojans	7	7	14	10	38

=== @ Florida Atlantic ===
	1	2	3	4	Total
Trojans	0	17	0	10	27
Owls	14	3	9	8	34

=== @ Tennessee ===
	1	2	3	4	Total
Trojans	10	20	10	8	48
Volunteers	21	10	3	21	55

=== Navy ===
	1	2	3	4	Total
Midshipmen	0	21	7	3	31
Trojans	14	14	3	10	41

=== Arkansas State ===
	1	2	3	4	Total
Red Wolves	13	7	14	7	41
Trojans	7	10	6	11	34

=== @ Middle Tennessee ===
	1	2	3	4	Total
Trojans	7	0	7	7	21
Blue Raiders	10	3	3	8	24
