= 2010 Troy Trojans football team =

American college football season

2010 Troy Trojans football

Sun Belt co-champion New Orleans Bowl champion

New Orleans Bowl, W 48–21 vs. Ohio
- Conference: Sun Belt Conference
- Record: 8–5 (6–2 Sun Belt)
- Head coach: Larry Blakeney (20th season)
- Offensive coordinator: Kenny Edenfield (1st season)
- Offensive scheme: Spread
- Defensive coordinator: Jeremy Rowell (5th season)
- Base defense: 4–2–5
- Home stadium: Veterans Memorial Stadium

2010 Sun Belt Conference football standings
	Conf.			Overall
Team	W		L	W		L
Troy +	6	–	2	8	–	5
FIU +	6	–	2	7	–	6
Middle Tennessee	5	–	3	6	–	7
Louisiana–Monroe	4	–	4	5	–	7
Arkansas State	4	–	4	4	–	8
Florida Atlantic	3	–	5	4	–	8
Louisiana–Lafayette	3	–	5	3	–	9
North Texas	3	–	5	3	–	9
Western Kentucky	2	–	6	2	–	10
+ – Conference co-champions

The 2010 Troy Trojans football team represented Troy University in the 2010 NCAA Division I FBS football season. They played their home games at Movie Gallery Stadium in Troy, Alabama and competed in the Sun Belt Conference. They were led by 20th-year head coach Larry Blakeney. They finished the season with a record of 8–5 (6–2 Sun Belt) to win a share of their fifth consecutive Sun Belt title and a 48–21 victory over Ohio in the New Orleans Bowl.

== Schedule ==
Date	Time	Opponent	Site	TV	Result	Attendance	Source
September 4	6:00 pm	Bowling Green*	Veterans Memorial Stadium; Troy, AL		W 30–27	19,886	
September 11	6:05 pm	at Oklahoma State*	Boone Pickens Stadium; Stillwater, OK		L 38–41	48,820	
September 18	3:00 pm	at UAB*	Legion Field; Birmingham, AL		L 33–34	23,681	
September 25	2:30 pm	Arkansas State	Veterans Memorial Stadium; Troy, AL	CSS	W 35–28	16,320	
October 5	7:00 pm	at Middle Tennessee	Johnny "Red" Floyd Stadium; Murfreesboro, TN (Battle for the Palladium)	ESPN2	W 42–13	28,010	
October 16	6:00 pm	Louisiana	Veterans Memorial Stadium; Troy, AL		W 31–24	22,283	
October 30	2:30 pm	at Louisiana–Monroe	Malone Stadium; Monroe, LA	CSS	L 14–28	19,980	
November 6	6:00 pm	at North Texas	Fouts Field; Denton, TX		W 41–35	14,289	
November 13	2:30 pm	FIU^{†}	Veterans Memorial Stadium; Troy, AL	CSS	L 35–52	20,243	
November 20	11:21 am	at No. 17 South Carolina*	Williams–Brice Stadium; Columbia, SC	SEC Network	L 24–69	74,117	
November 27	2:30 pm	Western Kentucky	Veterans Memorial Stadium; Troy, AL		W 28–14	16,004	
December 4	1:00 pm	at Florida Atlantic	Lockhart Stadium; Fort Lauderdale, FL	ESPNU	W 44–7	11,368	
December 18	8:00 pm	vs. Ohio*	Louisiana Superdome; New Orleans, LA (New Orleans Bowl)	ESPN	W 48–21	29,159	
*Non-conference game; ^{†}Homecoming; Rankings from AP Poll released prior to the game; All times are in Central time

== Personnel ==
=== Coaching staff ===
- Larry Blakeney – Head Coach
- Kenny Edenfield – Offensive Coordinator/Inside Receivers
- Jeremy Rowell – Defensive Coordinator/Secondary
- Shane Wasden – Outside Receivers/Special Teams Coordinator
- Eandy Butler – Defensive Ends
- Maurea Crain – Defensive Line
- Chip Lindsey – Quarterbacks
- Beniy Parker – Linebackers
- John Schlarman – Running Game Coordinator/Offensive Line
- Richard Shaughnessy – Strength and Conditioning

== NFL draft ==
3rd Round, 83rd Overall Pick by the New York Giants—Sr. WR Jerrel Jernigan
