= 1967 Troy State Red Wave football team =

American college football season

1967 Troy State Red Wave football

ACC champion
- Conference: Alabama Collegiate Conference
- Record: 8–2 (3–0 ACC)
- Head coach: Billy Atkins (2nd season)
- Home stadium: Veterans Memorial Stadium

1967 Alabama Collegiate Conference football standings
	Conf.					Overall
Team	W		L		T	W		L		T
Troy State $	3	–	0	–	0	8	–	2	–	0
Jacksonville State	1	–	1	–	1	4	–	5	–	1
Florence State	1	–	2	–	0	2	–	6	–	1
Livingston	0	–	2	–	1	4	–	5	–	1
$ – Conference champion

The 1967 Troy State Red Wave football team represented Troy State University (now known as Troy University) as a member of the Alabama Collegiate Conference (ACC) during the 1967 NAIA football season. Led by second-year head coach Billy Atkins, the Red Wave compiled an overall record of 8–2 with a mark of 3–0 in conference play, winning the ACC title.

== Schedule ==
Date	Opponent	Site	Result	Attendance	Source
September 9	at Gordon Military College*	Barnesville, GA	W 17–0		
September 16	Samford*	Veterans Memorial Stadium; Troy, AL	W 17–14		
September 23	vs. Livingston	Cramton Bowl; Montgomery, AL	W 33–0	7,000	
September 30	at State College of Arkansas*	Estes Stadium; Conway, AR	L 21–26		
October 7	at Delta State*	Delta Field; Cleveland, MS	W 7–0		
October 14	Jacksonville State	Veterans Memorial Stadium; Troy, AL (rivalry)	W 46–0		
October 21	Florence State	Veterans Memorial Stadium; Troy, AL	W 31–19		
October 28	at No. 5 Northwestern State*	Demon Field; Natchitoches, LA	W 28–21	9,000	
November 4	Tennessee–Martin*^{†}	Veterans Memorial Stadium; Troy, AL	L 12–20		
November 11	Louisiana College*	Veterans Memorial Stadium; Troy, AL	W 75–0		
*Non-conference game; ^{†}Homecoming; Rankings from AP Poll released prior to the game
