= Jed Solomon =

American football player (born 1992)

No. 17
- Position: Kicker

Personal information
- Born: December 29, 1992 (age 33); Valdosta, Georgia, U.S.
- Listed height: 5 ft 8 in (1.73 m)
- Listed weight: 175 lb (79 kg)

Career information
- High school: Lowndes (GA)
- College: Troy
- NFL draft: 2016: undrafted

Career history
- Cleveland Gladiators (2017); Atlanta Havoc (2018); Columbus Lions (2021)

Career AFL statistics
- FG made: 0
- FG att: 0
- PAT made: 85
- PAT att: 91
- Tackles: 2
- Stats at ArenaFan.com

Jed Solomon (born December 29, 1992) is an American former professional football placekicker. He played for the Cleveland Gladiators of the Arena Football League, the Atlanta Havoc of the American Arena League (AAL), and the Columbus Lions of the National Arena League.

== College career ==
After graduating from Lowndes High School in Valdosta, Georgia, Solomon attended Troy University and played for the Troy Trojans football team. He graduated in 2015, ranked second all time in field goal percentage, with 78.9%.

== Professional career ==
After going undrafted in the 2016 NFL draft, Solomon eventually signed with the Cleveland Gladiators of the Arena Football League on May 18, 2017, during the 2017 Arena Football League season. In the 2017 season, Solomon went 16-for-28 on PAT attempts. He was placed on reassignment on June 14, 2017.

He signed with the Atlanta Havoc for the 2018 season. He went 85–91 on PAT's leaving him with 93% made and was voted the league's best kicker.

Solomon also played in 2021 for the Columbus Lions.
