= 2007 Troy Trojans football team =

American college football season

2007 Troy Trojans football

Sun Belt co-champion
- Conference: Sun Belt Conference
- Record: 8–4 (6–1 Sun Belt)
- Head coach: Larry Blakeney (17th season)
- Offensive coordinator: Tony Franklin (2nd season)
- Offensive scheme: Air raid
- Defensive coordinator: Jeremy Rowell (2nd season)
- Base defense: 4–2–5
- Home stadium: Movie Gallery Stadium

2007 Sun Belt Conference football standings
	Conf.			Overall
Team	W		L	W		L
Florida Atlantic +	6	–	1	8	–	5
Troy +	6	–	1	8	–	4
Middle Tennessee	4	–	3	5	–	7
Louisiana–Monroe	4	–	3	6	–	6
Arkansas State	3	–	4	5	–	7
Louisiana–Lafayette	3	–	4	3	–	9
FIU	1	–	6	1	–	11
North Texas	1	–	6	2	–	10
+ – Conference co-champions

The 2007 Troy Trojans football team represented Troy University as a member of the Sun Belt Conference during the 2007 NCAA Division I FBS football season. Led by 17th-year head coach Larry Blakeney, the Trojans compiled an overall record of 8–4 with a mark of 6–1 in conference play, sharing the Sun Belt title with Florida Atlantic. This was the second consecutive season in which Troy captured a share of the conference title. The team played home games at Movie Gallery Stadium in Troy, Alabama.

== Schedule ==
Date	Time	Opponent	Site	TV	Result	Attendance
September 1	6:00 pm	at No. 20 Arkansas*	Donald W. Reynolds Razorback Stadium; Fayetteville, AR		L 26–46	73,926
September 8	6:00 pm	at No. 3 Florida*	Ben Hill Griffin Stadium; Gainesville, FL	CSS	L 31–59	90,244
September 14	7:00 pm	Oklahoma State*	Movie Gallery Stadium; Troy, AL	ESPN2	W 41–23	24,102
September 22	6:00 pm	at Louisiana–Lafayette	Cajun Field; Lafayette, LA	ESPN Plus	W 48–31	14,091
September 29	6:00 pm	Louisiana–Monroe	Movie Gallery Stadium; Troy, AL	CSS	W 24–7	18,273
October 6	7:00 pm	at FIU	Miami Orange Bowl; Miami, FL		W 34–16	5,723
October 20	2:30 pm	North Texas^{†}	Movie Gallery Stadium; Troy, AL	ESPN Plus	W 45–7	23,887
October 27	6:00 pm	at Arkansas State	ASU Stadium; Jonesboro, AR	ESPN Plus	W 27–0	14,694
November 3	12:00 pm	at No. 10 Georgia*	Sanford Stadium; Athens, GA		L 34–44	92,746
November 10	3:00 pm	at Western Kentucky*	Houchens Industries–L. T. Smith Stadium; Bowling Green, KY		W 21–17	16,972
November 20	6:00 pm	Middle Tennessee	Movie Gallery Stadium; Troy, AL (Battle for the Palladium)	ESPN2	W 45–7	18,242
December 1	1:00 pm	Florida Atlantic	Movie Gallery Stadium; Troy, AL	CSS	L 32–38	17,893
*Non-conference game; ^{†}Homecoming; Rankings from AP Poll released prior to the game; All times are in Central time

== Rankings ==
Ranking movements Legend: ██ Increase in ranking ██ Decrease in ranking
	Week																
Poll	Pre	1	2	3	4	5	6	7	8	9	10	11	12	13	14	15	Final
AP								40	35	33	37			34			
Coaches													36	38			
Harris	Not released										40				36		Not released
BCS	Not released																Not released

== Coaching staff ==
- Larry Blakeney – Head coach
- Shayne Wasden – Assistant head coach
- Tony Franklin – Offensive coordinator/quarterbacks
- Jeremy Rowell – Defensive coordinator/secondary
- Randy Butler – Defensive ends/recruiting coordinator
- Maurea Crain – Defensive line
- Neal Brown – Inside receivers
- Benjy Parker – Linebackers
- John Schlarman – Offensive line
- Chad Scott – Running backs
- Richard Shaughnessy – Strength and conditioning
