= 2010 Western Kentucky Hilltoppers football team =

American college football season

2010 Western Kentucky Hilltoppers football
- Conference: Sun Belt Conference
- Record: 2–10 (2–6 SBC)
- Head coach: Willie Taggart (1st season)
- Offensive scheme: West Coast
- Defensive coordinator: Clint Bowen (1st season)
- Base defense: 4–3
- Home stadium: Houchens Industries–L. T. Smith Stadium

2010 Sun Belt Conference football standings
	Conf.			Overall
Team	W		L	W		L
Troy +	6	–	2	8	–	5
FIU +	6	–	2	7	–	6
Middle Tennessee	5	–	3	6	–	7
Louisiana–Monroe	4	–	4	5	–	7
Arkansas State	4	–	4	4	–	8
Florida Atlantic	3	–	5	4	–	8
Louisiana–Lafayette	3	–	5	3	–	9
North Texas	3	–	5	3	–	9
Western Kentucky	2	–	6	2	–	10
+ – Conference co-champions

The 2010 Western Kentucky Hilltoppers football team represented Western Kentucky University (WKU) in the 2010 NCAA Division I FBS football season. The Hilltoppers were led by first-year head coach Willie Taggart and played their home games at Houchens Industries–L. T. Smith Stadium. They are members of the Sun Belt Conference.

The Hilltoppers finished the season with a 2–10 record, and 2–6 in Sun Belt play which placed them in last place. The 2 wins by the team marked the first and second victories as members of the Sun Belt.

== Schedule ==
Date	Time	Opponent	Site	TV	Result	Attendance
September 4	6:00 p.m.	at No. 9 Nebraska*	Memorial Stadium; Lincoln, Nebraska	FSN PPV	L 10–49	85,555
September 11	6:30 p.m.	at Kentucky*	Commonwealth Stadium; Lexington, Kentucky	CSS	L 28–63	66,584
September 18	4:00 p.m.	Indiana*	Houchens Industries–L. T. Smith Stadium; Bowling Green, Kentucky	BTN	L 21–38	20,772
September 25	6:00 p.m.	at South Florida*	Raymond James Stadium; Tampa, Florida	Big East Network	L 12–24	40,206
October 9	2:30 p.m.	at Florida International	FIU Stadium; Miami, FL	CST/CSS	L 21–28	14,335
October 16	6:00 p.m.	Louisiana-Monroe	Houchens Industries–L. T. Smith Stadium; Bowling Green, Kentucky		L 30–35	15,142
October 23	4:00 p.m.	at Louisiana-Lafayette	Cajun Field; Lafayette, Louisiana		W 54–21	15,641
October 30	2:00 p.m.	North Texas	Houchens Industries–L. T. Smith Stadium; Bowling Green, Kentucky		L 6–33	14,373
November 6	3:30 p.m.	Florida Atlantic	Houchens Industries–L. T. Smith Stadium; Bowling Green, Kentucky		L 16–17	10,275
November 13	2:00 p.m.	at Arkansas State	ASU Stadium; Jonesboro, Arkansas		W 36–35 ^{OT}	11,826
November 20	3:15 p.m.	Middle Tennessee	Houchens Industries–L. T. Smith Stadium; Bowling Green, Kentucky (100 Miles of Hate)	Sun Belt Network	L 26–27	12,322
November 27	2:30 p.m.	at Troy	Veterans Memorial Stadium; Troy, Alabama		L 14–28	16,004
*Non-conference game; Rankings from Coaches' Poll released prior to the game; All times are in Central time
