= Levi Brown (quarterback) =

American gridiron football player and coach (born 1987)

Current position
- Title: Quarterbacks coach
- Team: Valdosta State Blazers
- Conference: GSC

Biographical details
- Born: March 11, 1987 (age 39); Mt. Juliet, Tennessee, U.S.
- Education: Troy University

Playing career
- 2005–2006: Richmond
- 2007–2009: Troy
- 2010–2011: Buffalo Bills
- 2012: Saskatchewan Roughriders
- 2013: Winnipeg Blue Bombers (Note: Offseason and/or practice squad member only)
- Position: Quarterback

Coaching career (HC unless noted)
- 2016–2017: Troy (GA)
- 2018: Faulkner (OC)
- 2019–present: Valdosta State (QB)

Accomplishments and honors

Awards
- As a player: Sun Belt Player of the Year (2009); Sun Belt Offensive Player of the Year (2009); First-team All-Sun Belt (2009)

Jacob Levi Brown (born March 11, 1987) is an American football coach and former quarterback who is currently the quarterbacks coach at Valdosta State University. He played college football for the Richmond Spiders and the Troy Trojans and was selected by the Buffalo Bills in the seventh round of the 2010 NFL draft.

Brown also served as a graduate assistant at his alma mater, and the offensive coordinator for the Faulkner University.

== College career ==
Brown played for the University of Richmond from 2005 to 2006. He only started three games at Richmond, and after the 2006 season, transferred to Troy University. After redshirting during the 2007 season, Brown started in 2008 with the Trojans. He has many Trojan passing records. In 2009, he broke the Troy and Sunbelt Conference record by passing for 4,254 yards. He finished second in the nation in passing yards in 2009, and Brown was the Sun Belt Conference Player of the Year.

== Professional career ==
Pre-draft measurables
Height	Weight	Arm length	Hand span	40-yard dash	10-yard split	20-yard split	20-yard shuttle	Three-cone drill	Vertical jump	Broad jump	Bench press
6 ft 3 1/2 in (1.92 m)	229 lb (104 kg)	31 1/2 in (0.80 m)	9 1/2 in (0.24 m)	4.82 s	1.72 s	2.82 s	4.41 s	7.07 s	34.5 in (0.88 m)	8 ft 11 in (2.72 m)	20 reps
All values from the NFL Combine/Pro Day

=== Buffalo Bills ===
After much speculation that the Buffalo Bills were going to select a quarterback in the 2010 NFL draft, Brown was made the newest Bills quarterback in the seventh round (209th overall). He was cut by the Bills September 4, 2010, on final cuts. The Bills opted to keep Brian Brohm as their third quarterback and Levi was not signed to the practice squad. However, following the release of Trent Edwards on September 27, Buffalo resigned Brown, and he served as the team's third quarterback.

Brown was waived in final cuts prior to the 2011 season, after the Bills signed Brad Smith and Tyler Thigpen as Ryan Fitzpatrick's backup quarterbacks; because he spent most of the year as the third-string quarterback (a position that was not considered a part of the active roster until 2011), he was eligible for, and was placed on, the practice squad.

Brown was cut from the practice squad on September 13, 2011.

=== Saskatchewan Roughriders ===
On March 20, 2012, it was announced that Brown had been signed by the Saskatchewan Roughriders. He was later placed on the injured list. On June 17, 2013, it was announced that Brown has been released by the Saskatchewan Roughriders.

=== Winnipeg Blue Bombers ===
On September 4, 2013, it was announced that Brown had been signed by the Winnipeg Blue Bombers and added to their practice roster.

== Career statistics ==
=== NFL ===
Year	Team	GP	GS	Passing								Rushing			
Year	Team	GP	GS	Cmp	Att	Pct	Yds	Y/A	TD	Int	Rtg	Att	Yds	Avg	TD
2010	BUF	1	0	2	3	66.7	24	8.0	0	1	51.4	0	0	0.0	0

=== College ===
Year	Team	Passing								Rushing			
Year	Team	Cmp	Att	Pct	Yds	Y/A	TD	Int	Rtg	Att	Yds	Avg	TD
2008	Troy	201	326	61.7	2,030	6.2	15	3	127.3	33	17	0.5	0
2009	Troy	321	504	63.7	4,254	8.4	23	9	146.1	54	7	0.1	1
Career		522	830	62.9	6,284	7.6	38	12	138.7	87	24	0.3	1

== Coaching career ==
Brown currently serves as the quarterbacks coach for the Valdosta State University American football team. Brown was a graduate assistant coach at Troy University, his alma mater in Troy, Alabama, where Brown earned bachelor's and master's degrees. He returned to work with his former mentor and new head coach Neal Brown. Brown worked with the Quarterbacks and mentored current Troy University starter Brandon Silvers. Brown was the offensive coordinator at Faulkner University, Montgomery Alabama before accepting the quarterback coach job at Valdosta State University.
