= Pratt Lyons =

American football player (born 1974)

No. 98
- Position: Defensive end

Personal information
- Born: September 17, 1974 (age 52); Fort Worth, Texas, U.S.
- Listed height: 6 ft 5 in (1.96 m)
- Listed weight: 295 lb (134 kg)

Career information
- High school: Trimble Tech (Fort Worth)
- College: Utah State; Troy State
- NFL draft: 1997: 4th round, 107th overall pick

Career history
- Tennessee Oilers (1997–1999)

Career NFL statistics
- Tackles: 52
- Sacks: 4.5
- Stats at Pro Football Reference

Pratt Gilbert Lyons Jr. (born September 17, 1974) is an American former professional football player who was a defensive end for two seasons with the Tennessee Oilers of the National Football League (NFL).

Lyons played college football for the Utah State Aggies and Troy Trojans before being selected by the Oilers in the fourth round of the 1997 NFL draft with the 107th overall pick.
