= Perry Griggs =

American football player (born 1954)

No. 28
- Position: Wide receiver

Personal information
- Born: September 17, 1954 (age 72); Lafayette, Alabama, U.S.
- Listed height: 5 ft 10 in (1.78 m)
- Listed weight: 183 lb (83 kg)

Career information
- High school: Lanett (Lanett, Alabama)
- College: Troy State
- NFL draft: 1977: 5th round, 116th overall pick

Career history
- Baltimore Colts (1977)

Career NFL statistics
- Games played: 1
- Stats at Pro Football Reference

Perry Griggs (born September 17, 1954) is an American former professional football player who was a wide receiver in the National Football League (NFL) in 1977 for the Baltimore Colts. He played college football for the Troy Trojans.

== Early life and career ==
Griggs attended Lanett High School in Chambers County, Alabama before moving on to Troy State University. He joined the Trojans as a walk-on in 1973, but by 1974 was named the Gulf South Conference's Player of the year, leading the team in scoring, receptions, punt returns and kickoff returns. He set a school record for kickoff returns, and led the country in 28.0 yards per punt return.
