= Battle for the Palladium =

American college football rivalry

- Middle Tennessee Blue Raiders Troy Trojans
- First meeting: October 9, 1936; Middle Tennessee, 19–0
- Latest meeting: November 21, 2020; Middle Tennessee, 20–17
- Next meeting: September 17, 2033
- Trophy: The Palladium

Statistics
- Total meetings: 22
- All-time series: Middle Tennessee leads 13–9
- Largest victory: Troy, 45–7 (2007)
- Longest win streak: Middle Tennessee, 8 (1936–1953)
- Current win streak: Middle Tennessee (1)

Locations of Middle Tennessee and Troy

The Battle for the Palladium is a college football rivalry matchup between the Middle Tennessee Blue Raiders and Troy Trojans. The history between Middle Tennessee and Troy dates back to 1936, which was the oldest rivalry in the Sun Belt Conference when both teams were in the same league together. In 1999, the rivalry was renewed after a 46-year hiatus. The lengthy period was a result of the two programs competing in different divisions. That all changed when Troy announced it would make the move from Division I-AA to I-A and join the Sun Belt Conference, allowing the two programs to compete annually.

With both of the program's history dating back longer than any other in the conference, the proximity between the schools, and the intense recruitment for the same players, the rivalry quickly re-ignited from 1999 to 2001. The rivalry escalated when both teams unintentionally attended the same movie theater and a few verbal taunts were traded the night before the 2001 contest. In 2003, The Palladium Trophy was introduced in Murfreesboro, Tennessee. A year later, Troy officially joined the Sun Belt Conference.

In 2008, ESPN named The Battle for the Palladium as one of the Top 5 Group of 5 conference rivalries in college football.

In 2020 the rivalry was played twice in a home-and-home series. The away team won both times, first Troy in Murfreesboro, then Middle Tennessee in Troy. Middle Tennessee won the second of the two games to take the trophy back. The two teams will meet in a home-and-home series in 2033 and 2034.

== The Palladium ==
Greek mythology holds that The Palladium is a wooden statue that fell from the Heavens. It was kept at the Temple of Athena in the city of Troy. According to legend, as long as The Palladium was preserved within the walls of the city, Troy would be safe and could not be taken. However, a Raider by the name of Odysseus—also known as the Raider of Cities—stole the Palladium during the Trojan War leading to the fall of Troy. In the spirit of the Blue Raiders' and Trojans' link to Greek mythology, Middle Tennessee and Troy compete in the Battle for The Palladium whenever they meet in football. Legend dictates the winner of The Palladium gains an unknown and unexplainable advantage over the other making it more difficult to regain control during future battles. The history between the two schools dates back to 1936 with the Blue Raiders owning a 13–9 advantage in the series.

== History of the trophy ==
In 2003, alumni from Middle Tennessee undertook a grassroots effort to engage fans, alums, and the Student Government Associations from both schools to capitalize on the escalating rivalry with a trophy. The Palladium became the perfect match due to the schools' Greek Mythology ties. Middle Tennessee's mascot, Lightning, is a Pegasus-like winged horse, and the city of Troy has forever been linked to Greek Mythology. Marcia Berkall, a wood carving artists who owns Whittlins and Wood, was commissioned to replicate the wooden statue of Athena and The Palladium was born. The Palladium is approximately three feet tall and is made of basswood. Gold leaf was applied to Athena's helmet, shield and to the tip of the spear.

== History of the series ==
From 1936 to 1953, Middle Tennessee dominated the series winning eight consecutive matchups. In those early years, the games were generally lopsided as Middle Tennessee shutout Troy in five of the eight wins. Troy earned its first win when the series renewed in 1999. In a stretch from 2006 to 2011, Troy had won six straight and seven of the past eight meetings. The last game was played in 2020, with Troy winning 47–14. Middle Tennessee currently leads the all-time series 13–9. As of 2020, Troy has won seven of the last ten games, only losing in 2005, 2012, and 2020.

The most memorable game in the rivalry came in 2006. With Middle Tennessee undefeated in conference play on the final day of the regular season and Troy hoping to beat the Blue Raiders to gain a share of the conference championship, the Trojans scored 14 points in the final 2:19 to win 21–20 in what has been called the Miracle in Murfreesboro. Middle Tennessee appeared to have throttled the Trojans high-powered offense for the entire game and led comfortably when Troy took possession with just over two minutes left. However, Troy scored a quick touchdown followed by a successful onside kick. Troy then scored the game clinching touchdown with seconds remaining preventing Middle Tennessee from winning its first outright Sun Belt Championship. Troy and Middle Tennessee shared the conference championship, but it was Troy who went on to the New Orleans Bowl. Middle Tennessee was selected for the Motor City Bowl.

== Game results ==
Middle Tennessee victories	Troy victories	Tie games

No.	Date	Location	Winner	Score
1	October 9, 1936	Murfreesboro, TN	Middle Tennessee	19–0
2	October 1, 1937	Troy, AL	Middle Tennessee	12–0
3	November 18, 1939	Murfreesboro, TN	Middle Tennessee	14–7
4	October 3, 1942	Murfreesboro, TN	Middle Tennessee	20–0
5	November 15, 1946	Murfreesboro, TN	Middle Tennessee	12–0
6	November 14, 1947	Troy, AL	Middle Tennessee	41–17
7	October 11, 1952	Murfreesboro, TN	Middle Tennessee	33–7
8	October 10, 1953	Troy, AL	Middle Tennessee	6–0
9	October 2, 1999	Murfreesboro, TN	Troy State	48–31
10	September 8, 2001	Murfreesboro, TN	Middle Tennessee	54–17
11	November 8, 2003	Murfreesboro, TN	Middle Tennessee	27–20
12	November 20, 2004	Troy, AL	Troy State	37–17

No.	Date	Location	Winner	Score
13	November 26, 2005	Troy, AL	Middle Tennessee	17–7
14	November 25, 2006	Murfreesboro, TN	Troy	21–20
15	November 20, 2007	Troy, AL	Troy	45–7
16	August 28, 2008	Murfreesboro, TN	Troy	31–17
17	October 6, 2009	Troy, AL	Troy	31–7
18	October 5, 2010	Murfreesboro, TN	Troy	42–13
19	September 24, 2011	Troy, AL	Troy	38–35
20	November 24, 2012	Murfreesboro, TN	Middle Tennessee	24–21
21	September 19, 2020	Murfreesboro, TN	Troy	47–14
22	November 21, 2020	Troy, AL	Middle Tennessee	20–17
Series: Middle Tennessee leads 13–9

== See also ==
- List of NCAA college football rivalry games
