= Jerrel Jernigan =

American gridiron football player (born 1989)

No. 3, 12
- Position: Wide receiver / Return specialist

Personal information
- Born: June 14, 1989 (age 37); Midway, Alabama, U.S.
- Listed height: 5 ft 8 in (1.73 m)
- Listed weight: 189 lb (86 kg)

Career information
- High school: Eufaula (Eufaula, Alabama)
- College: Troy
- NFL draft: 2011: 3rd round, 83rd overall pick

Career history
- New York Giants (2011–2014); Winnipeg Blue Bombers (2016)*
- * Offseason or practice squad member only

Awards and highlights
- Super Bowl champion (XLVI); 3× First-team All-Sun Belt (2008, 2009, 2010)

Career NFL statistics
- Receptions: 38
- Receiving yards: 391
- Rushing attempts: 4
- Rushing yards: 61
- Return yards: 492
- Total touchdowns: 3
- Stats at Pro Football Reference

Jerrel Marquis Jernigan (born June 14, 1989) is an American former professional football player who was a wide receiver in the National Football League (NFL). He was selected by the New York Giants in the third round of the 2011 NFL draft and won Super Bowl XLVI with the team against the New England Patriots. He played college football for the Troy Trojans.

== Professional career ==
=== Pre-draft ===
Pre-draft measurables
Height	Weight	Arm length	Hand span	Wingspan	40-yard dash	10-yard split	20-yard split	20-yard shuttle	Three-cone drill	Vertical jump	Broad jump	Bench press
5 ft 8 7/8 in (1.75 m)	185 lb (84 kg)	32 in (0.81 m)	9 1/4 in (0.23 m)	6 ft 2 7/8 in (1.90 m)	4.40 s	1.45 s	2.46 s	4.25 s	6.94 s	38.0 in (0.97 m)	10 ft 4 in (3.15 m)	11 reps
All values from NFL Combine/Pro Day

He was considered one of the best wide receiver prospects for the 2011 NFL Draft. He was a starter all four years for the Trojans. He earned first-team All-Sun Belt three times. Jernigan's body frame and playing style was compared to the likes of DeSean Jackson and Steve Smith.

=== New York Giants ===
Jernigan was selected by the New York Giants in the third round with the 83rd overall pick in the 2011 NFL Draft. Through four seasons with the Giants, Jernigan played in 34 games catching 38 passes for 391 yards with 2 touchdowns.

At the end of the 2011 season, Jernigan and the Giants appeared in Super Bowl XLVI. He had three kick returns for 71 net yards as the Giants defeated the New England Patriots by a score of 21–17.

=== Winnipeg Blue Bombers ===
After not playing professional football in 2015, Jernigan signed with the Winnipeg Blue Bombers of the Canadian Football League on April 12, 2016.

== Personal life ==
Jerrel currently works at Eufaula High School as the head football coach where he played in high school.
