= 2009 Sun Belt Conference football season =

- League: NCAA Division I FBS (Football Bowl Subdivision)
- Sport: football
- Duration: September 3, 2009 through January 6, 2010
- Teams: 9
- TV partner: ESPN

2010 NFL Draft
- Top draft pick: Alex Carrington
- Picked by: Buffalo Bills, 72nd overall

Regular season
- Champion: Troy
- Season MVP: Levi Brown

Football seasons
- ← 2008 2010 →

2009 Sun Belt Conference football standings
	Conf.			Overall
Team	W		L	W		L
Troy $	8	–	0	9	–	4
Middle Tennessee	7	–	1	10	–	3
Louisiana–Monroe	5	–	3	6	–	6
Florida Atlantic	5	–	3	5	–	7
Louisiana–Lafayette	4	–	4	6	–	6
Arkansas State	3	–	5	4	–	8
FIU	3	–	5	3	–	9
North Texas	1	–	7	2	–	10
Western Kentucky	0	–	8	0	–	12
$ – Conference champion

The 2009 Sun Belt Conference football season was an NCAA football season that was played from September 3, 2009, to January 6, 2010. The Sun Belt Conference consists of 9 football members: Arkansas State, Florida Atlantic, Florida International, Louisiana-Lafayette, Louisiana-Monroe, Middle Tennessee, North Texas, Troy, and Western Kentucky who becomes a full-time member in 2009 after 2 seasons as an independent and conditional member who played a limited Sun Belt schedule after transitioning from the Football Championship Subdivision. Troy won the Sun Belt Championship and played in the GMAC Bowl where they lost in two overtimes to Central Michigan. Middle Tennessee was the only other Sun Belt member to be invited to a bowl game, the New Orleans Bowl, where they defeated Southern Mississippi.

== Previous season ==
Troy (8–5) were the Sun Belt champions and lost to Southern Mississippi in the R+L Carriers New Orleans Bowl 30–27.

Three other Sun Belt teams, Arkansas State, Florida Atlantic, and Louisiana-Lafayette, were bowl eligible with records of 6-6, but only Florida Atlantic was invited to a bowl game, the Motor City Bowl defeating Central Michigan 24–21.

== Preseason ==
=== Preseason poll ===
The 2009 Sun Belt coaches preseason poll was announced during a two-day media web-based event on July 20 and 21. Defending champion Troy was selected as the favorite to win the conference.

==== Sun Belt Coaches Poll ====
1. Troy – 72 (5)
2. Arkansas State – 69
3. Florida Atlantic – 61 (1)
4. Middle Tennessee – 52
5. Florida International - 43 (1)
6. Louisiana-Lafayette – 39 (1)
7. Louisiana-Monroe – 34 (1)
8. North Texas – 18
9. Western Kentucky - 17

=== Award watch lists ===
Award	School	Player
Bronko Nagurski Trophy	Troy	Brandon Lang
Dave Rimington Trophy	Florida International	Brad Serini
Dave Rimington Trophy	Louisiana-Lafayette	Chris Fisher
Dave Rimington Trophy	Middle Tennessee	Mark Thompson
Dave Rimington Trophy	Troy	Danny Franks
Lombardi Award	Arkansas State	Alex Carrington
Lombardi Award	Louisiana-Lafayette	Brad Bustle
Lombardi Award	Louisiana-Lafayette	Chris Fisher
Lombardi Award	Louisiana-Monroe	Cardia Jackson
Lombardi Award	Troy	Danny Franks
Lombardi Award	Troy	Brandon Lang
Lombardi Award	Troy	Boris Lee
Lombardi Award	Troy	Cameron Sheffield
Lombardi Award	Troy	Bear Woods
Manning Award	Arkansas State	Corey Leonard
Manning Award	Florida Atlantic	Rusty Smith
Manning Award	Troy	Levi Brown
Lou Groza Award	Arkansas State	Josh Arauco
Lou Groza Award	Troy	Sam Glusman
Outland Trophy	Louisiana-Lafayette	Chris Fisher
Fred Biletnikoff Award	Florida Atlantic	Cortez Gent
Fred Biletnikoff Award	Florida International	T. Y. Hilton
Fred Biletnikoff Award	Troy	Jerrel Jernigan
Walter Camp Award	Florida Atlantic	Rusty Smith
Doak Walker Award	Arkansas State	Reggie Arnold
Doak Walker Award	Middle Tennessee	Phillip Tanner
Doak Walker Award	Troy	DuJuan Harris
Davey O'Brien Award	Florida Atlantic	Rusty Smith

== Regular season ==
Index to colors and formatting
Sun Belt member won
Sun Belt member lost
Sun Belt teams in **bold**

All times reflect the local time for that team (Central Time-Arkansas State, Louisiana-Lafayette, Louisiana-Monroe, Middle Tennessee, North Texas and Troy. Eastern Time- Florida Atlantic, Florida International, Western Kentucky). Conference games times are that of the home team.

Rankings reflect that of the USA Today Coaches poll for that week until week eight when the BCS rankings will be used.

=== Week One ===
Date	Time	Visiting team	Home team	Site	TV	Result	Attendance
September 3	6:00 p.m.	**Troy**	Bowling Green	Doyt Perry Stadium • Bowling Green, OH		**L** 31-14	14,514
September 3	6:30 p.m.	**North Texas**	Ball State	Scheumann Stadium • Muncie, IN	ESPNU	**W** 20-10	16,054
September 5	12:20 p.m.	**Western Kentucky**	Tennessee	Neyland Stadium • Knoxville, TN		**L** 63-7	98,761
September 5	5:00 p.m.	**Middle Tennessee**	Clemson	Memorial Stadium • Clemson, SC		**L** 37-14	75,000
September 5	6:00 p.m.	Mississippi Valley State	**Arkansas State**	ASU Stadium • Jonesboro, AR		**W** 61-0	21,056
September 5	6:00 p.m.	Southern	**Louisiana-Lafayette**	Cajun Field • Lafayette, LA		**W** 42–19	41,357
September 5	6:00 p.m.	**Louisiana-Monroe**	#2 Texas	Darrell K Royal–Texas Memorial Stadium • Austin, TX	FSN	**L** 59-20	101,096
September 5	7:00 p.m.	**Florida Atlantic**	#22 Nebraska	Memorial Stadium • Lincoln, NE	FSN	**L** 49-3	85,719

=== Week Two ===
Date	Time	Visiting team	Home team	Site	TV	Result	Attendance
September 12	11:20 a.m.	**Troy**	#1 Florida	Ben Hill Griffin Stadium • Gainesville, FL		**L** 56-6	90,349
September 12	1:00 p.m.	**Arkansas State**	#18 Nebraska	Memorial Stadium • Lincoln, NE	FSN	**L** 38-9	85,035
September 12	6:00 p.m.	Kansas State	**Louisiana-Lafayette**	Cajun Field • Lafayette, LA		**W** 17-15	16,431
September 12	6:00 p.m.	Texas Southern	**Louisiana-Monroe**	Malone Stadium • Monroe, LA		**W** 58-0	9,330
September 12	6:00 p.m.	Memphis	**Middle Tennessee**	Johnny "Red" Floyd Stadium • Murfreesboro, TN		**W** 31-14	28,105
September 12	6:00 p.m.	Ohio	**North Texas**	Fouts Field • Denton, TX		**L** 31–30 in 2OT	16,674
September 12	7:00 p.m.	**Florida International**	#4 Alabama	Bryant–Denny Stadium • Tuscaloosa, AL		**L** 40-14	92,012
September 12	7:30 p.m.	South Florida	**Western Kentucky**	Houchens Industries–L. T. Smith Stadium • Bowling Green, KY	ESPNU	**L** 35-13	20,568

=== Week Three ===
Date	Time	Visiting team	Home team	Site	TV	Result	Attendance
September 19	12:20 p.m.	**North Texas**	#4 Alabama	Bryant–Denny Stadium • Tuscaloosa, AL	SEC Network	**L** 53-7	92,012
September 19	2:30 p.m.	**Middle Tennessee**	Maryland	Byrd Stadium • College Park, MD		**W** 32-31	43,167
September 19	2:30 p.m.	Alabama-Birmingham	**Troy**	Movie Gallery Stadium • Troy, AL		**W** 27-14	21,182
September 19	5:00 p.m.	**Florida International**	Rutgers	Rutgers Stadium • Piscataway, NJ		**L** 23-15	45,273
September 19	6:00 p.m.	**Louisiana-Lafayette**	Louisiana State	Tiger Stadium • Baton Rouge, LA	ESPNU	**L** 31-3	92,443
September 19	7:00 p.m.	**Florida Atlantic**	South Carolina	Williams-Brice Stadium • Columbia, SC		**L** 38-16	72,017
September 19	7:00 p.m.	Central Arkansas	**Western Kentucky**	Houchens Industries-L.T. Smith Stadium • Bowling Green, KY		**L** 28-7	19,044
September 19	9:00 p.m.	**Louisiana-Monroe**	Arizona State	Sun Devil Stadium • Tempe, AZ	FSN	**L** 38-14	43,780

=== Week Four ===
Date	Time	Visiting team	Home team	Site	TV	Result	Attendance
September 26	3:30 p.m.	**Troy**	**Arkansas State**	ASU Stadium • Jonesboro, AR	CST	**TROY** 30-27	23,641
September 26	4:00 p.m.	**Louisiana-Monroe**	**Florida Atlantic**	Lockhart Stadium • Ft. Lauderdale, FL		**ULM** 27-25	14,229
September 26	6:00 p.m.	**Louisiana-Lafayette**	#24 Nebraska	Memorial Stadium • Lincoln, NE	FSN	**L** 55-0	86,304
September 26	6:00 p.m.	**Middle Tennessee**	**North Texas**	Fouts Field • Denton, TX		**MTSU** 37-21	22,346
September 26	6:00 p.m.	**Western Kentucky**	Navy	Navy–Marine Corps Memorial Stadium • Annapolis, MD		**L** 38-22	29,009
September 26	7:00 p.m.	Toledo	**Florida Atlantic**	FIU Stadium • Miami, FL		**L** 41-31	11,047

=== Week Five ===
Date	Time	Visiting team	Home team	Site	TV	Result	Attendance
October 3	11:00 a.m.	**Arkansas State**	#17 Iowa	Kinnick Stadium • Iowa City, IA	ESPN2	**L** 24-21	67,989
October 3	2:30 p.m.	**Florida International**	**Louisiana-Monroe**	Malone Stadium • Monroe, LA	Sun Belt Network	**ULM** 48-35	17,610
October 3	4:00 p.m.	Wyoming	**Florida Atlantic**	Lockhart Stadium • Ft. Lauderdale, FL		**L** 30-28	15,744

=== Week Six ===
Date	Time	Visiting team	Home team	Site	TV	Result	Attendance
October 6	7:00 p.m.	**Middle Tennessee**	**Troy**	Movie Gallery Stadium • Troy, AL	ESPN2	**TROY** 31-7	17,108
October 10	6:00 p.m.	**North Texas**	**Louisiana-Lafayette**	Cajan Field • Lafayette, LA	Sun Belt Network	**ULL** 38-34	12,141
October 10	7:00 p.m.	**Florida International**	**Western Kentucky**	Houchens Industries - L. T. Smith Stadium • Bowling Green, KY		**FIU** 37-20	13,574

=== Week Seven ===
Date	Time	Visiting team	Home team	Site	TV	Result	Attendance
October 13	7:00 p.m.	**Arkansas State**	**Louisiana-Monroe**	Malone Stadium • Monroe, LA	ESPN2	**ULM** 16-10	14,378
October 17	11:30 a.m.	Mississippi State	**Middle Tennessee**	Johnny "Red" Floyd Stadium • Murfreesboro, Tennessee	ESPNU	**L** 27-6	23,882
October 17	5:00 p.m.	**Louisiana-Lafayette**	**Western Kentucky**	Houchens Industries Smith Stadium • Bowling Green, KY		**ULL** 30-22	11,919
October 17	6:00 p.m.	**Florida Atlantic**	**North Texas**	Fouts Field • Denton, TX	Sun Belt Network	**UNT** 40-44	23,319
October 17	7:00 p.m.	**Troy**	**Florida International**	FIU Stadium • Miami, FL		**TROY** 42-33	10,142

=== Week Eight ===
Date	Time	Visiting team	Home team	Site	TV	Result	Attendance
October 24	2:30 p.m.	**North Texas**	**Troy**	Movie Gallery Stadium • Troy, AL		**TROY** 50-26	20,032
October 24	2:30 p.m.	**Western Kentucky**	**Middle Tennessee**	Johnny "Red" Floyd Stadium • Murfreesboro, Tennessee		**MTSU** 62-24	17,787
October 24	4:00 p.m.	**Florida Atlantic**	**Louisiana-Lafayette**	Cajun Field • Lafayette, LA		**FAU** 51-29	21,135
October 24	6:00 p.m.	**Florida International**	**Arkansas State**	ASU Stadium • Jonesboro, AR		**ASU** 27-10	18,779
October 24	6:00 p.m.	**Louisiana-Monroe**	Kentucky	Commonwealth Stadium • Lexington, KY		**L** 36-13	68,203

=== Week Nine ===
Date	Time	Visiting team	Home team	Site	TV	Result	Attendance
October 31	12:00 p.m.	**Louisiana-Lafayette**	**Florida International**	FIU Stadium • Miami, FL		**FIU** 20–17 in OT	8,593
October 31	2:30 p.m.	**Arkansas State**	Louisville	Papa John's Cardinal Stadium • Louisville, KY		**L** 21-13	21,497
October 24	3:15 p.m.	**Western Kentucky**	**North Texas**	Fouts Field • Denton, TX	Sun Belt Network	**UNT** 68-49	11,214
October 31	4:00 p.m.	**Middle Tennessee**	**Florida Atlantic**	Lockhart Stadium • Ft. Lauderdale, FL		**MTSU** 27-20	15,568
October 31	6:00 p.m.	**Louisiana-Monroe**	**Troy**	Movie Gallery Stadium • Troy, AL		**TROY** 42-21	17,106

=== Week Ten ===
Date	Time	Visiting team	Home team	Site	TV	Result	Attendance
November 7	2:00 p.m.	**Florida Atlantic**	Alabama Birmingham	Legion Field • Birmingham, AL		**L** 56-29	17,283
November 7	2:30 p.m.	**Louisiana-Lafayette**	**Arkansas State**	ASU Stadium • Jonesboro, AR	Sun Belt Network	**ULL** 21-18	16,215
November 7	3:00 p.m.	**Louisiana-Monroe**	**North Texas**	Fouts Field • Denton, TX		**ULM** 33-6	12,167
November 7	3:30 p.m.	**Florida International**	**Middle Tennessee**	Johnny "Red" Floyd Stadium • Murfreesboro, Tennessee		**MTSU** 48-21	17,808
November 7	5:00 p.m.	**Troy**	**Western Kentucky**	Houchens Industries Smith Stadium • Bowling Green, KY		**TROY** 40-20	16,747

=== Week Eleven ===
Date	Time	Visiting team	Home team	Site	TV	Result	Attendance
November 14	3:00 p.m.	**Western Kentucky**	**Louisiana-Monroe**	Malone Stadium • Monroe, LA		**ULM** 21-18	16,229
November 14	3:15 p.m.	**Louisiana-Lafayette**	**Middle Tennessee**	Johnny "Red" Floyd Stadium • Murfreesboro, Tennessee	Sun Belt Network	**MTSU** 34-17	16,411
November 14	4:00 p.m.	**Arkansas State**	**Florida Atlantic**	Lockhart Stadium • Ft. Lauderdale, FL		**FAU** 35-18	16,218
November 14	6:30 p.m.	**Troy**	Arkansas	Razorback Stadium • Fayetteville, AR		**L** 56-20	66,442
November 14	7:00 p.m.	**North Texas**	**Florida International**	FIU Stadium • Miami, FL		**FIU** 35-28	11,128

=== Week Twelve ===
Date	Time	Visiting team	Home team	Site	TV	Result	Attendance
November 21	12:30 p.m.	**Florida International**	#1 Florida	Ben Hill Griffin Stadium • Gainesville, FL		**L** 62-3	90,473
November 21	3:00 p.m.	Army	**North Texas**	Fouts Field • Denton, Texas		**L** 17-13	23,647
November 21	3:15 p.m.	**Florida Atlantic**	**Troy**	Movie Gallery Stadium • Troy, AL		**TROY** 47-21	16,638
November 21	3:30 p.m.	**Arkansas State**	**Middle Tennessee**	Johnny "Red" Floyd Stadium • Murfreesboro, Tennessee	Sun Belt Network	**MTSU** 38-14	19,111
November 21	6:00 p.m.	**Louisiana-Monroe**	**Louisiana-Lafayette**	Cajun Field • Lafayette, LA		**ULL** 21-17	8,689

=== Week Thirteen ===
Date	Time	Visiting team	Home team	Site	TV	Result	Attendance
November 28	2:00 p.m.	**North Texas**	**Arkansas State**	ASU Stadium • Jonesboro, AR		**ARST** 30-26	8,754
November 28	3:30 p.m.	**Middle Tennessee**	**Louisiana-Monroe**	Malone Stadium • Monroe, LA		**MTSU**	11,896
November 28	4:00 p.m.	**Western Kentucky**	**Florida Atlantic**	Lockhart Stadium • Ft. Lauderdale, FL		**FAU** 29-23	14,671
November 28	6:00 p.m.	**Troy**	**Louisiana-Lafayette**	Cajun Field • Lafayette, LA		**TROY** 48-31	12,245

=== Week Fourteen ===
Date	Time	Visiting team	Home team	Site	TV	Result	Attendance
December 3	7:00 p.m.	**Arkansas State**	**Western Kentucky**	Houchens Industries - L. T. Smith Stadium • Bowling Green, KY		**ARST** 24-20	4,513
December 5	7:00 p.m.	**Florida Atlantic**	**Florida International**	FIU Stadium • Miami, FL		**FAU** 28-21	10,108

== Bowl games ==
Bowl Game	Date	Stadium	City	Television	Matchup/Results	Attendance	Payout (US$)
R+L Carriers New Orleans Bowl	December 20, 2009	Louisiana Superdome	New Orleans, LA	ESPN	Middle Tennessee 42, Southern Miss 32	30,228	$325,000
GMAC Bowl	January 6, 2010	Ladd–Peebles Stadium	Mobile, AL	ESPN	Central Michigan 44, Troy 41 2OT	34,486	$750,000

== Players of the Year ==
2009 Sun Belt Player of the Year awards

Award	Player	School
Player of the Year	Levi Brown	Troy
Offensive Player of the Year	Levi Brown	Troy
Defensive Players of the Year	Cardia Jackson; Chris McCoy	Louisiana-Monroe; Middle Tennessee
Freshman of the Year	Shawn Southward	Troy
Coaches of the Year	Rick Stockstill; Larry Blakeney	Middle Tennessee; Troy

== All-Sun Belt Team ==
Coaches All-Conference Selections

Position	Player	Class	Team
First Team Offense
QB	Levi Brown	SR	Troy
RB	Alfred Morris	SO	Florida Atlantic
RB	Lance Dunbar	SO	North Texas
WR	LaGregory Sapp	SR	Louisiana-Monroe
WR	Jerrel Jernigan	JR	Troy
TE	Jason Harmon	SR	Florida Atlantic
OL	Brad Bustle	SR	Louisiana-Lafayette
OL	Chris Fisher	SR	Louisiana-Lafayette
OL	Mark Thompson	SR	Middle Tennessee
OL	Danny Franks	SR	Troy
OL	Tyler Clark	JR	Troy
First Team Defense
DL	Alex Carrington	SR	Arkansas State
DL	Aaron Morgan	SR	Louisiana-Monroe
DL	Chris McCoy	SR	Middle Tennessee
DL	Brandon Lang	SR	Troy
LB	Cardia Jackson	SR	Louisiana-Monroe
LB	Boris Lee	SR	Troy
LB	Bear Woods	SR	Troy
DB	Greg James	SR	Louisiana-Monroe
DB	Jeremy Kellem	JR	Middle Tennessee
DB	Alex Suber	SR	Middle Tennessee
DB	Marcus Udell	SR	Middle Tennessee
First Team Special Teams
PK	Alan Gendreau	SO	Middle Tennessee
P	Spencer Ortego	JR	Louisiana-Lafayette
RS	T. Y. Hilton	SO	Florida International
AP	Jerrel Jernigan	JR	Troy

Position	Player	Class	Team
Second Team Offense
QB	Dwight Dasher	JR	Middle Tennessee
RB	Frank Goodin	JR	Louisiana-Monroe
RB	Bobby Rainey	SO	Western Kentucky
WR	T. Y. Hilton	SO	Florida International
WR	Jamaal Jackson	JR	North Texas
TE	Ladarius Green	SO	Louisiana-Lafayette
OL	Derek Newton	JR	Arkansas State
OL	David Matlock	SR	Florida Atlantic
OL	Brad Serini	JR	Florida International
OL	Esteban Santiago	JR	North Texas
OL	Mark Fisher	JR	Middle Tennessee
Second Team Defense
DL	Bryan Hall	JR	Arkansas State
DL	Jamari Lattimore	JR	Middle Tennessee
DL	Cameron Sheffield	SR	Troy
DL	Kevin Dixon	SR	Troy
LB	Antwyne Zanders	SR	Louisiana-Lafayette
LB	Danny Carmichael	SR	Middle Tennessee
LB	Cam Robinson	SR	Middle Tennessee
DB	Anthony Gaitor	JR	Florida International
DB	James Truxillo	SR	Louisiana-Monroe
DB	Courtland Fuller	SR	Troy
DB	Bryan Willis	FR	Troy
Second Team Special Teams
PK	Josh Arauco	SR	Arkansas State
P	Carlos Munera	SR	Florida International
RS	Jerrel Jernigan	JR	Troy
AP	Bobby Rainey	SO	Western Kentucky

== Attendance ==
Team	Stadium (capacity)	Game 1	Game 2	Game 3	Game 4	Game 5	Game 6	Total	Average	% of Capacity
Arkansas State	ASU Stadium (30,964)	21,056	23,631	18,779	16,215	8,754		88,435	17,687	57.1
Florida Atlantic	Lockhart Stadium (20,450)	14,229	15,744	15,568	16,218	14,671		76,460	15,286	74.7
Florida International	FIU Stadium (20,000)	11,047	10,142	8,593	11,128	10,108		51,018	10,204	51.0
Louisiana-Lafayette	Cajun Field (31,000)	41,357	16,431	12,141	21,135	8,689	12,245	111,998	18,666	60.2
Louisiana-Monroe	Malone Stadium (30,427)	9,330	17,610	14,378	16,229	11,896		69,443	13,889	45.6
Middle Tennessee	Johnny "Red" Floyd Stadium (31,000)	28,105	23,882	17,787	17,808	16,411	19,111	120,104	20,017	64.6
North Texas	Fouts Field (30,000)	16,674	22,346	23,319	11,214	12,167		85,720	17,144	57.1
Troy	Movie Gallery Stadium (30,000)	21,182	17,108	20,032	17,106	16,638		92,066	18,413	61.4
Western Kentucky	Houchens Industries–L. T. Smith Stadium (22,000)	20,568	19,044	13,574	11,919	16,747	4,513	86,365	14,394	65.4
