= 2009 New Orleans Bowl =

2009 R+L Carriers New Orleans Bowl
| Southern Miss Golden Eagles | Middle Tennessee Blue Raiders |
| (7-5) | (9–3) |
| C-USA | Sun Belt |
| 32 | 42 |
| Head coach: Larry Fedora | Head coach: Rick Stockstill |
| | 1 | 2 | 3 | 4 | Total |
|---|---|---|---|---|---|
| Southern Miss | 14 | 3 | 3 | 12 | 32 |
| Middle Tennessee | 0 | 14 | 14 | 14 | 42 |
- Date: December 20, 2009
- Season: 2009
- Stadium: Louisiana Superdome
- Location: New Orleans, Louisiana
- MVP: QB Dwight Dasher, MTSU
- Referee: Jeff Maconaghy (Big East)
- Attendance: 30,228
- Payout: US$325,000 per team

United States TV coverage
- Network: ESPN
- Announcers: Dave Lamont & JC Pearson

The 2009 R+L Carriers New Orleans Bowl was the ninth edition of the bowl. The game was played at the Louisiana Superdome in New Orleans, Louisiana on Sunday, December 20, 2009. The game was televised live on ESPN. The Middle Tennessee Blue Raiders, the Sun Belt Conference runners-up, defeated the Southern Miss Golden Eagles, a team from Conference USA, by a score of 42–32. The kickoff took place at 7:30 p.m., Central Time.

Southern Miss returned to the New Orleans Bowl for the second straight season and faced one of the nation's hottest teams, Middle Tennessee. Middle Tennessee reached nine wins for the first time since moving to the Football Bowl Subdivision in 1999 and was on a six-game winning streak going into the game, also a team high in that span. The New Orleans Bowl's Sun Belt slot typically goes to the conference champion, but Troy, who lost 30–27 to Southern Miss in the 2008 New Orleans Bowl, played in the GMAC Bowl in Mobile, Alabama, instead, opening the opportunity for Middle Tennessee. The bowl marked the Blue Raiders' second bowl appearance in four seasons. Southern Miss was playing in their 12th bowl in 13 years. It was also the fourth time Southern Miss played in the New Orleans Bowl in the game's nine-year history. They were 3–0 in New Orleans Bowl games before the loss. The game also marked the first meeting between the two schools.

== Game summary ==
Middle Tennessee wore their home blue jerseys, Southern Mississippi wore their away white jerseys.

The star of the game was MTSU quarterback Dwight Dasher, who rushed for 201 yards, the most ever by a quarterback in a bowl game. He broke the quarterback bowl rushing record of 200 yards set by Texas' Vince Young in the 2006 Rose Bowl against Southern California. Dasher also rushed for 2 touchdowns and passed for 2 more. Southern Miss quarterback Martevious Young completed 18 of 34 passes for 271 yards, three touchdowns and two interceptions.

Southern Miss running back Damion Fletcher ran for 78 yards. He finished the season with 1,015 to become the ninth player in major college football to reach 1,000 in all four seasons. With 5,302 yards rushing overall, Fletcher passed Herschel Walker (5,259) and LaDainian Tomlinson (5,263) for eighth on the NCAA's career list.

=== Scoring summary ===
| Scoring Play | Score |
|---|---|
1st Quarter
| USM - Tory Harrison 2 Yd Run (Two-Point Run Conversion Failed), 10:42 | USM 6-0 |
| USM - DeAndre Brown 24 Yd Pass From Martevious Young (Martevious Young Pass To Deandre Brown For Two-Point Conversion), 6:35 | USM 14-0 |
2nd Quarter
| MTSU - Garrett Andrews 11 Yd Pass From Dwight Dasher (Alan Gendreau Kick), 13:25 | USM 14-7 |
| MTSU - Shane Blissard 9 Yd Pass From Dwight Dasher (Alan Gendreau Kick), 4:41 | Tie 14-14 |
| USM - Daniel Hrapmann 20 Yd, 00:00 | USM 17-14 |
3rd Quarter
| MTSU - Dwight Dasher 35 Yd Run (Alan Gendreau Kick), 10:12 | MTSU 21-17 |
| USM - Daniel Hrapmann 38 Yd, 7:36 | MTSU 21-20 |
| MTSU - Chris McClover 23 Yd Pass From Brent Burnette (Alan Gendreau Kick), 00:00 | MTSU 28-20 |
4th Quarter
| USM - DeAndre Brown 7 Yd Pass From Martevious Young (Two-Point Pass Conversion Failed), 6:52 | MTSU 28-26 |
| MTSU - Benjamin Cunningham 2 Yd Run (Alan Gendreau Kick), 3:14 | MTSU 35-26 |
| MTSU - Dwight Dasher 1 Yd Run (Alan Gendreau Kick), 1:13 | MTSU 42-26 |
| USM - Freddie Parham 33 Yd Pass From Martevious Young (Two-Point Pass Conversion Failed), 00:27 | MTSU 42-32 |
