= 2009 Louisiana–Lafayette Ragin' Cajuns football team =

American college football season

2009 Louisiana–Lafayette Ragin' Cajuns football
- Conference: Sun Belt Conference
- Record: 6–6 (4–4 Sun Belt)
- Head coach: Rickey Bustle (8th season)
- Offensive coordinator: Ron Hudson (2nd season)
- Offensive scheme: Multiple
- Defensive coordinator: Kevin Fouquier (3rd season)
- Base defense: Multiple
- Home stadium: Cajun Field

2009 Sun Belt Conference football standings
	Conf.			Overall
Team	W		L	W		L
Troy $	8	–	0	9	–	4
Middle Tennessee	7	–	1	10	–	3
Louisiana–Monroe	5	–	3	6	–	6
Florida Atlantic	5	–	3	5	–	7
Louisiana–Lafayette	4	–	4	6	–	6
Arkansas State	3	–	5	4	–	8
FIU	3	–	5	3	–	9
North Texas	1	–	7	2	–	10
Western Kentucky	0	–	8	0	–	12
$ – Conference champion

The 2009 Louisiana–Lafayette Ragin' Cajuns football team represented the University of Louisiana at Lafayette in the 2009 NCAA Division I FBS football season. The Ragin' Cajuns were led by eighth year head coach Rickey Bustle and played their home games at Cajun Field. The Ragin' Cajuns finished the season with a record of 6–6 overall and 4–4 in Sun Belt Conference play.

The 41,357 attendance at the Hebert Heymann Football Classic against Southern still holds the record for most attendance at Cajun Field.

== Preseason ==
=== Award Watchlist ===
Award	Player	Position	Year
Dave Rimington Trophy	Chris Fisher	C	SR
Lombardi Award	Chris Fisher	C	SR
Lombardi Award	Brad Bustle	G	SR
Outland Trophy	Chris Fisher	C	SR

=== Sun Belt Media Day ===
==== Preseason Standings ====
Sun Belt Conference Predicted Standings
Predicted finish	Team	Votes (1st Place)
1	Troy	72 (5)
2	Arkansas State	69
3	Florida Atlantic	61 (1)
4	Middle Tennessee	52
5	Florida International	43 (1)
6	Louisiana-Lafayette	39 (1)
7	Louisiana-Monroe	34 (1)
8	North Texas	18
9	Western Kentucky	17

== Roster ==
2009 Louisiana-Lafayette Ragin' Cajuns football team roster
Players
Coaches
Offense

Pos.	#	Name	Class
WR	3	Pierre Hill	So
RB	6	Robert Walker	Fr
QB	7	Chris Masson	So
QB	8	Brad McGuire	So
QB	11	Keldric White	Fr
QB	13	Brady Thomas	Fr
WR	15	Ross Goodlett	So
WR	15	Verlin Moore	Jr
QB	17	Blaine Gautier	Fr
QB	18	Emile Joseph	Fr
WR	19	Marlin Miller	Jr
WR	23	Matt Campbell	So
RB	26	Yobes Walker	Fr
RB	29	Draylon Booker	Fr
RB	31	Undrea Sails	Sr
RB	31	Deon Walker	Sr
RB	33	Julian Shankle	So
FB	34	Geoffrey McCullough	Sr
RB	40	Matt Dupre	Sr
FB	43	Ian Roberts	Fr
FB	46	Matt Desormeaux	Jr
OT	51	Colin Windsor	Jr
OL	57	Robert Robinson	Fr
G	60	Ian Burks	Jr
OL	61	Mike Muguira	Fr
G	63	Josh Robinson	So
OL	64	Daniel Lemelle	Fr
OT	66	Sean Osborne	Fr
OT	67	Jesse Newman	Sr
C	67	Byrnes Tatford	Fr
C	68	Matthew Autrey	So
OL	69	Ashton Tyler	Fr
OL	70	Evan Ruiz	Fr
OL	72	Leonardo Bates	Fr
OT	73	Jonathan DeCoster	Jr
G	74	Kyle Plouhar	So
G	75	Brad Bustle	Sr
OL	76	Jaron Odom	Fr
OT	77	Nasser Jamal	Jr
OT	78	Kyle Pirtle	Sr
C	79	Chris Fisher	Sr
WR	80	Darrius Duffy	Sr
TE	80	Dusty Mack	Sr
WR	81	Richie Falgout	Jr
TE	82	Jacob Maxwell	Fr
WR	82	Jawanza Mitchell	So
WR	83	Ryan Finney	Sr
WR	83	Andrew Joseph	So
WR	84	Louis Lee	Sr
TE	85	Luke Aubrey	Sr
WR	86	Vernon Wolfe	Jr
TE	87	Brendan Wilson	Fr
TE	88	Brandon Williams	Fr
TE	89	Ladarius Green	So
FB		Joel Banks	Fr
WR		Javone Lawson	Fr
WR		Ashton LeBlanc	Fr
OL		D'Amate Ledet	Fr
FB		John Simon	Fr
FB		Jonathan Thomas	So
TE		Ian Thompson	Fr
WR		Julien Troullier	Fr

Defense

Pos.	#	Name	Class
CB	2	Orkeys Auriene	Jr
LB	4	Daylon McCoy	Jr
CB	5	Dwight Bentley	So
LB	10	Fred Davis	Jr
SS	20	Chris Richard	So
SS	21	Lance Kelley	So
CB	22	Rodney Gillis	Fr
CB	23	Junior Jean	Sr
SS	24	Phillip Nevels	Sr
FS	26	Justin Lee	Sr
LB	27	Phillip Walker	Sr
FS	30	Gerren Blount	Sr
FS	36	Maurice Rolle	Jr
LB	37	Devon Lewis-Buchanan	So
DB	38	Tim Jackson	Fr
CB	39	Julian Jones	Jr
LB	41	Antwyne Zanders	Sr
DE	45	Emeke Onyenekwu	Fr
LB	47	Grant Fleming	Jr
LB	48	Andrew Hebert	Fr
LB	49	Kyron Benoit	So
DE	50	Justin Anderson	Fr
DE	50	Jeremy Cook	Jr
DE	52	Jesse Broadnax	Fr
LB	53	Jezreel Washington	Sr
LB	55	Brandon Nash	Fr
LB	56	Richard Brooks	So
LB	57	Fred Okoye	So
DE	58	Nate Douglas	So
DT	59	Brandon McCray	Fr
DT	61	Bobby Fails	Sr
DT	65	Barry Sterling	Fr
DT	71	Jordan Hanby	So
DE	71	Trace Wilson	Fr
DT	90	Derreck Dean	So
DT	91	Sharrick Moore	Jr
DT	92	Tory Day	Fr
DE	92	Hall Davis	Sr
DT	94	Jermaine Rogers	Jr
DT	95	LaQuincy Williams	Sr
DE	96	Chris Lanaux	Sr
DE	97	Terrell Richardson	Jr
DT	98	Jordan Topp	Jr
DT	99	Tyrell Gaddies	So
DT	99	Seth Adams	Sr
DB		Winston Burnette	Fr
DB		Ken Dandridge	Sr
DT		Ben Duhon	Fr
CB		Reuban Foster	Fr
FS		Seth Guilbeaux	Jr
SS		Jordan Kennerson	Fr
LB		Matt Lefeaux	So
LB		Jewell Ratliff	Fr
LB		Andrew Rumney	Fr
LB		William Stevenson	Fr
DE		Paul Toce	Fr
DB		Melvin White	So

Special teams

Pos.	#	Name	Class
K	25	Brett Baer	Fr
P	35	Spencer Ortego	Jr
LS	54	Scott Hayes	Sr
LS		Matt Gore	Fr

Head coach

- Rickey Bustle (Clemson)

Coordinators/assistant coaches

- Ron Hudson (Louisville)
  Offensive coordinator
- Kevin Fouquier (Texas A&M)
  Defensive coordinator
- Jorge Munoz (Bethany (KS))
  Assistant coach
- Troy Wingerter (Louisiana)
  Assistant head coach

Legend

- (C) Team captain
- (S) Suspended
- (I) Ineligible
- Injured
- Redshirt

Roster
Last update: January 20, 2019

== Schedule ==
Date	Time	Opponent	Site	TV	Result	Attendance
September 5	6:00 pm	Southern*	Cajun Field; Lafayette, LA		W 42–19	41,357
September 12	6:00 pm	Kansas State*	Cajun Field; Lafayette, LA		W 17–15	16,431
September 19	6:00 pm	at No. 7 LSU*	Tiger Stadium; Baton Rouge, LA	ESPNU	L 3–31	92,443
September 26	6:00 pm	at No. 24 Nebraska*	Memorial Stadium; Lincoln, NE	FSN	L 0–55	86,304
October 10	6:00 pm	North Texas	Cajun Field; Lafayette, LA	CST/CSS	W 38–34	12,141
October 17	6:00 pm	at Western Kentucky	Houchens Industries–L. T. Smith Stadium; Bowling Green, KY		W 30–22	11,919
October 24	4:00 pm	Florida Atlantic^{†}	Cajun Field; Lafayette, LA		L 29–51	21,135
October 31	11:00 am	at Florida International	FIU Stadium; Miami, FL		L 17–20 ^{OT}	8,593
November 7	2:30 pm	at Arkansas State	ASU Stadium; Jonesboro, AR	CST/CSS	W 21–18	16,215
November 14	3:15 pm	at Middle Tennessee	Johnny "Red" Floyd Stadium; Murfreesboro, TN	CST/CSS	L 17–34	16,411
November 21	6:00 pm	Louisiana–Monroe	Cajun Field; Lafayette, LA (Battle on the Bayou)		W 21–17	8,689
November 28	6:00 pm	Troy	Cajun Field; Lafayette, LA		L 31–48	12,245
*Non-conference game; ^{†}Homecoming; Rankings from Coaches' Poll released prior to the game; All times are in Central time

== Game summaries ==
=== Southern ===
Southern at Louisiana-Lafayette – Game summary

Quarter	1	2	3	4	Total
Jaguars	12	0	0	7	19
Ragin' Cajuns	7	14	7	7	35

at Cajun Field, Lafayette, LA

- Date: September 5
- Game time: 6:00 p.m. CST
- Game weather: 86 °F (30 °C); mostly cloudy
- Game attendance: 41,357
- Referee: Lewis Marshall

Game information

First quarter

- ULL - Chris Masson 1-yard TD run, Tyler Albrecht kick good, 7:25 (ULL 7-0)
- SOU - Juamorris Stewart 26-yard TD pass from Bryant Lee, Josh Duran kick no good, 3:03 (ULL 7-6)
- SOU - Stewart 51-yard TD pass from Lee, Duran kick no good, 0:18 (SOU 12-7)

Second quarter

- ULL - Pierre Hill 42-yard TD pass from Richie Falgout, Albrecht kick good, 12:21 (ULL 14-12)
- ULL - Undrea Sails 56-yard TD pass from Masson, Albrecht kick good, 7:19 (ULL 21-12)
- ULL - Sails 2-yard TD run, Albrecht kick good, 1:27 (ULL 28-12)

Third quarter

- ULL - Luke Aubrey 10-yard TD pass from Masson, Albrecht kick good, 6:58 (ULL 35-12)

Fourth quarter

- ULL - Julian Shankle 6-yard TD run, Albrecht kick good, Albrecht kick good, 8:38 (ULL 42-12)
- SOU - Jeremiah McGinty 1-yard TD run, Duran kick good, 1:15 (ULL 42-19)

Top passers

- ULL - Chris Masson - 18/24, 283 yards, 2 TD
- SOU - Bryant Lee - 18/29, 254 yards, 2 TD, 2 INT

Top rushers

- ULL - Undrea Sails - 19 carries, 114 yards, TD
- SOU - Brian Threat - 14 carries, 52 yards

Top receivers

- ULL - Louis Lee - 4 receptions, 86 yards
- SOU - Juamorris Stewart - 10 receptions, 173 yards, 2 TD

=== Kansas State ===
Kansas State at Louisiana-Lafayette – Game summary

Quarter	1	2	3	4	Total
Wildcats	2	0	0	13	15
Ragin' Cajuns	0	14	0	3	17

at Cajun Field, Lafayette, LA

- Date: September 12
- Game time: 6:00 p.m. CST
- Game weather: 75 °F (24 °C); light rain
- Game attendance: 16,431
- Referee: Tony Backert

Game information

First quarter

- KSU - Kansas State defense -8 yard tackle in endzone for SF, 2:43 (KSU 2-0)

Second quarter

- ULL - Undrea Sails 13-yard TD run, Tyler Albrecht kick good, 9:37 (ULL 7-2)
- ULL - Luke Aubrey 1-yard TD pass from Chris Masson, Albrecht kick good, 0:04 (ULL 14-2)

Fourth quarter

- KSU - Jeroon Mastrud 3-yard TD pass from Daniel Thomas, Josh Cherry kick no good, 14:56 (ULL 14-8)
- KSU - Thomas 3-yard TD run, Cherry kick good, 8:08 (KSU 15-14)
- ULL - Albrecht 48-yard field goal, 0:31 (ULL 17-15)

Top passers

- ULL - Chris Masson - 20/36, 185 yards, TD, INT
- KSU - Carson Coffman - 13/25, 178 yards, INT

Top rushers

- ULL - Undrea Sails - 20 carries, 78 yards, TD
- KSU - Daniel Thomas - 27 carries, 136 yards, TD

Top receivers

- ULL - Marlin Miller - 6 receptions, 47 yards
- KSU - Attrail Snipes - 3 receptions, 78 yards

=== @ LSU ===
Louisiana-Lafayette at LSU – Game summary

Quarter	1	2	3	4	Total
Ragin' Cajuns	0	3	0	0	3
No. 9 Tigers	7	10	7	7	31

at Tiger Stadium, Baton Rouge, LA

- Date: September 19
- Game time: 6:00 p.m. CST
- Game weather: 83 °F (28 °C); mostly cloudy
- Game attendance: 92,443
- Referee: Steve Shaw
- TV: ESPNU

Game information

First quarter

- LSU - Brandon LaFell 16-yard TD pass from Jordan Jefferson, Josh Jasper kick good, 3:09 (LSU 7-0)

Second quarter

- LSU - Trindon Holliday 12-yard TD run, Jasper kick good, 14:52 (LSU 14-0)
- ULL - Tyler Albrecht 41-yard field goal, 11:26 (LSU 14-3)
- LSU - Jasper 52-yard field goal, 0:00 (LSU 17-3

Third quarter

- LSU - LaFell 20-yard TD pass from Jefferson, Jasper kick good, 10:53 (LSU 24-3)

Fourth quarter

- LSU - Charles Scott 1-yard TD pass from Jarrett Lee, Jasper kick good, 5:40 (LSU 31-3)

Top passers

- LSU - Jordan Jefferson - 16/25, 165 yards, 2 TD, INT
- ULL - Chris Masson - 16/36, 159 yards, 2 INT

Top rushers

- LSU - Charles Scott - 12 carries, 63 yards
- ULL - Undrea Sails - 17 carries, 48 yards

Top receivers

- LSU - Terrence Toliver - 6 receptions, 68 yards
- ULL - Ladarius Green - 6 receptions, 64 yards

=== @ Nebraska ===
Louisiana-Lafayette at Nebraska – Game summary

Quarter	1	2	3	4	Total
Ragin' Cajuns	0	0	0	0	0
No. 25 Cornhuskers	13	21	7	14	55

at Memorial Stadium, Lincoln, NE

- Date: September 26
- Game time: 6:00 p.m. CST
- Game weather: 74 °F (23 °C); sunny
- Game attendance: 86,304
- Referee: Matt Loeffler
- TV: FSN PPV

Game information

First quarter

- NEB - Alex Henery 39-yard field goal, 7:06 (NEB 3-0)
- NEB - Ben Cotton fumble recovered in endzone for TD, Henery kick good, 5:03 (NEB 10-0)
- NEB - Henery 46-yard field goal, 0:08 (NEB 13-0)

Second quarter

- NEB - Chris Brooks 4-yard TD pass from Zac Lee, Henery kick good, 12:00 (NEB 20-0)
- NEB - Roy Helu, Jr. 2-yard TD run, Henery kick good, 11:11 (NEB 27-0)
- NEB - Larry Asante 74-yard interception returned for TD, Henery kick good, 6:16 (NEB 34-0)

Third quarter

- NEB - Helu, Jr. 2-yard TD run, Henery kick good, 8:36 (NEB 41-0)

Fourth quarter

- NEB - Rex Burkhead 24-yard TD pass from Cody Green, Henery kick good, 11:04 (NEB 48-0)
- NEB - Green 24-yard TD run, Henery kick good, 8:46 (NEB 55-0)

Top passers

- NEB - Zac Lee - 15/18, 238 yards, TD
- ULL - Chris Masson - 13/22, 102 yards, INT

Top rushers

- NEB - Ron Helu, Jr. - 15 carries, 83 yards, 2 TD
- ULL - Undrea Sails - 10 carries, 41 yards

Top receivers

- NEB - Curenski Gilleylen - 2 receptions, 85 yards
- ULL - Ladarius Green - 5 receptions, 68 yards

=== North Texas ===
North Texas at Louisiana-Lafayette – Game summary

Quarter	1	2	3	4	Total
Mean Green	3	21	10	0	34
Ragin' Cajuns	7	17	0	14	38

at Cajun Field, Lafayette, LA

- Date: October 10
- Game time: 6:00 p.m. CST
- Game attendance: 12,141
- TV: SBN

Game information

First quarter

- UNT - Jeremy Knott 41-yard field goal, 8:10 (UNT 3-0)
- ULL - Dwight Bentley 70-yard interception returned for TD, Tyler Albrecht kick good, 0:37 (ULL 7-3)

Second quarter

- ULL - Albrecht 45-yard field goal, 13:57 (ULL 10-3)
- UNT - Lance Dunbar 1-yard TD run, Knott kick good, 9:42 (TIE 10-10)
- ULL - Chris Masson 25-yard TD run, Albrecht kick good, 6:14 (ULL 17-10)
- ULL - Andrew Joseph 37-yard punt block returned for TD, Albrecht kick good, 4:41 (ULL 24-10)
- UNT - Dunbar 37-yard TD run, Knott kick good, 3:48 (ULL 24-17)
- UNT - Dunbar 1-yard TD run, Knott kick good, 0:37 (TIE 24-24)

Third quarter

- UNT - Knott 27-yard field goal, 10:39 (UNT 27-24)
- UNT - Dunbar 1-yard TD run, Knott kick good, 3:51 (UNT 34-24)

Fourth quarter

- ULL - Brad McGuire 1-yard TD run, Albrecht kick good, 9:26 (UNT 34-31)
- ULL - Marlin Miller 4-yard TD pass from Masson, Albrecht kick good, 0:27 (ULL 38-34)

Top passers

- ULL - Chris Masson - 13/29, 122 yards, TD
- UNT - Riley Dodge - 24/38, 209 yards, 3 INT

Top rushers

- ULL - Undrea Sails - 18 carries, 93 yards
- UNT - Lance Dunbar - 32 carries, 187 yards, 4 TD

Top receivers

- ULL - Louis Lee - 2 receptions, 30 yards
- UNT - Jamaal Jones - 10 receptions, 73 yards

=== @ Western Kentucky ===
Louisiana-Lafayette at Western Kentucky – Game summary

Quarter	1	2	3	4	Total
Ragin' Cajuns	10	10	7	3	30
Hilltoppers	7	7	0	14	28

at Houchens Industries–L. T. Smith Stadium, Bowling Green, KY

- Date: October 17
- Game time: 6:00 p.m. CST
- Game attendance: 11,919

Game information

First quarter

- WKU - Rod Johnson 29-yard TD pass from Kawaun Jakes, Casey Tinius kick good, 13:28 (WKU 7-0)
- ULL - Matt Desormeaux 2-yard TD pass from Chris Masson, Tyler Albrecht kick good, 9:00 (TIE 7-7)
- ULL - Albrecht 49-yard field goal, 2:07 (ULL 10-7)

Second quarter

- ULL - Javone Lawson 19-yard TD pass from Masson, Albrecht kick good, 13:45 (ULL 17-7)
- ULL - Albrecht 25-yard field goal, 11:51 (ULL 20-7)
- WKU - Bobby Rainey 2-yard TD rush, Tinius kick good, 7:20 (ULL 20-14)

Third quarter

- ULL - Masson 6-yard TD run, Albrecht kick good, 10:02 (ULL 27-14)

Fourth quarter

- ULL - Albrecht 25-yard field goal, 10:21 (ULL 30-14)
- WKU - Jake Gaebler 23-yard TD pass from Jakes, Rainey two-point conversion run good, 5:11 (ULL 30-22)

Top passers

- ULL - Chris Masson - 16/25, 204 yards, 2 TD
- WKU - Kawaun Jakes - 9/17, 141 yards, 2 TD, 2 INT

Top rushers

- ULL - Yobes Walker - 24 carries, 94 yards
- WKU - Bobby Rainey - 19 carries, 115 yards, TD

Top receivers

- ULL - Ladarius Green - 4 receptions, 73 yards
- WKU - Anthony Sheppard - 2 receptions, 42 yards

=== Florida Atlantic ===
Florida Atlantic at Louisiana-Lafayette – Game summary

Quarter	1	2	3	4	Total
Owls	14	13	14	10	51
Ragin' Cajuns	14	2	13	0	29

at Cajun Field, Lafayette, LA

- Date: October 24
- Game time: 4:00 p.m. CST
- Game weather: 67 °F (19 °C); partly cloudy
- Game attendance: 21,135
- Referee: Perry Havener

Game information

First quarter

- FAU - Chris Bonner 70-yard TD pass from Rusty Smith, Ross Gornall kick good, 13:41 (FAU 7-0)
- ULL - Marlin Miller 14-yard TD pass from Chris Masson, Tyler Albrecht kick good, 12:03 (TIE 7-7)
- FAU - Lester Jean 20-yard TD pass from Smith, Gornall kick good, 6:51 (FAU 14-7)
- ULL - Brad McGuire 9-yard TD run, Albrecht kick good, 0:24 (TIE 14-14)

Second quarter

- FAU - Alfred Morris 17-yard TD run, Gornall kick blocked and returned for a defensive conversion by Dwight Bentley, 11:19 (FAU 20-16)
- FAU - Jason Harmon 7-yard TD pass from Smith, Gornall kick good, 6:51 (FAU 27-16)

Third quarter

- ULL - McGuire 10-yard TD run, Albrecht kick no good, 10:38 (FAU 27-22)
- FAU - William Rose 14-yard TD run, Gornall kick good, 8:11 (FAU 34-22)
- ULL - McGuire 1-yard TD run, Albrecht kick good, 3:12 (FAU 34-29)
- FAU - Bonner 64-yard TD pass from Smith, Gornall kick good, 2:57 (FAU 41-29)

Fourth quarter

- FAU - Gornall 19-yard field goal, 5:14 (FAU 44-29)
- FAU - Morris 47-yard TD run, Gornall kick good, 2:48 (FAU 51-29)

Top passers

- FAU - Rusty Smith - 18/28, 359 yards, 4 TD
- ULL - Chris Masson - 19/30, 209 yards, TD, INT

Top rushers

- FAU - Alfred Morris - 24 carries, 181 yards, 2 TD
- ULL - Yobes Walker - 21 carries, 105 yards

Top receivers

- FAU - Chris Bonner - 2 receptions, 134 yards, 2 TD
- ULL - Marlin Miller - 7 receptions, 115 yards, TD

=== @ Florida International ===
Louisiana-Lafayette at Florida International – Game summary

Quarter	1	2	3	4	OT	Total
Ragin' Cajuns	7	7	0	3	0	17
Panthers	7	3	0	7	3	20

at Ocean Banks Field at FIU Stadium, Miami, FL

- Date: October 31
- Game time: 11:00 a.m. CST
- Game weather: 84 °F (29 °C); partly cloudy
- Game attendance: 8,593
- Referee: Jeff Hilyer

Game information

First quarter

- ULL - Yobes Walker 1-yard TD run, Tyler Albrecht kick good, 11:35 (ULL 7-0)
- FIU - Kendall Berry 1-yard TD run, Dustin Rivest kick good, 2:02 (TIE 7-7)

Second quarter

- ULL - Louis Lee 40-yard TD pass from Chris Masson, Albrecht kick good, 1:07 (ULL 14-7)
- FIU - Rivest 26-yard field goal, 0:00 (ULL 14-10)

Fourth quarter

- ULL - Albrecht 20-yard field goal, 2:27 (ULL 17-10)
- FIU - Greg Ellingson 3-yard TD pass from Paul McCall, Rivest kick good, 0:10 (TIE 17-17)

First overtime

- FIU - Rivest 24-yard field goal, (FIU 20-17)

Top passers

- FIU - Paul McCall - 22/41, 250 yards, TD, INT
- ULL - Chris Masson - 22/36, 254 yards, TD, INT

Top rushers

- FIU - Daunte Owens - 13 carries, 58 yards
- ULL - Yobes Walker - 18 carries, 40 yards, TD

Top receivers

- FIU - Wayne Times - 5 receptions, 60 yards
- ULL - Louis Lee - 3 receptions, 62 yards, TD

=== @ Arkansas State ===
Louisiana-Lafayette at Arkansas State – Game summary

Quarter	1	2	3	4	Total
Ragin' Cajuns	7	7	7	0	21
Red Wolves	0	3	0	15	18

at ASU Stadium, Jonesboro, AR

- Date: November 7
- Game time: 2:30 p.m. CST
- Game attendance: 16,215

Game information

First quarter

- ULL - Blaine Gautier 1-yard TD run, Tyler Albrecht kick good, 8:11 (ULL 7-0)

Second quarter

- ULL - Chris Masson 7-yard TD run, Albrecht kick good, 3:07 (ULL 14-0)
- ARST - Josh Arauco 36-yard field goal, 0:29 (ULL 14-3)

Third quarter

- ULL - Masson 2-yard TD run, Albrecht kick good, 5:48 (ULL 21-3)

Fourth quarter

- ARST - Reggie Arnold 2-yard TD run, Arauco kick good, 12:39 (ULL 21-10)
- ARST - Arnold 5-yard TD run, Aplin two-point conversion rush good, 10:10 (ULL 21-18)

Top passers

- ULL - Chris Masson - 28/40, 229 yards
- ARST - Ryan Aplin - 8/14, 147 yards, INT

Top rushers

- ULL - Yobes Walker - 12 carries, 51 yards
- ARST - Reggie Arnold - 10 carries, 38 yards, TD

Top receivers

- ULL - Andrew Joseph - 5 receptions, 60 yards
- ARST - Taylor Stockemer - 2 receptions, 89 yards

=== @ Middle Tennessee ===
Louisiana-Lafayette at Middle Tennessee – Game summary

Quarter	1	2	3	4	Total
Ragin' Cajuns	7	10	0	0	17
Blue Raiders	7	7	10	10	34

at Johnny "Red" Floyd Stadium, Murfreesboro, TN

- Date: November 14
- Game time: 3:15 p.m. CST
- Game weather: 69 °F (21 °C); sunny
- Game attendance: 16,411
- Referee: Jeff Roberson
- TV: SBN

Game information

First quarter

- ULL - Chris Masson 3-yard TD run, Tyler Albrecht kick good, 9:19 (ULL 7-0)
- MTSU - Patrick Honeycutt 18-yard TD pass from Dwight Dasher, Alan Gendreau kick good, 7:30 (TIE 7-7)

Second quarter

- ULL - Albrecht 24-yard field goal, 9:56 (ULL 10-7)
- MTSU - Jamari Lattimore 20-yard interception returned for TD, Gendreau kick good, 6:24 (MTSU 14-10)
- ULL - Vernon Wolfe 7-yard TD pass from Masson, Albrecht kick good, 0:09 (ULL 17-14)

Third quarter

- MTSU - Garrett Andrews 19-yard TD pass from Dasher, Gendreau kick good, 14:05 (MTSU 21-17)
- MTSU - Gendreau 30-yard field goal, 1:29 (MTSU 24-17)

Fourth quarter

- MTSU - Desmond Gee 7-yard TD run, Gendreau kick good, 13:16 (MTSU 31-17)
- MTSU - Gendreau 30-yard field goal, 9:16 (MTSU 34-17)

Top passers

- MTSU - Dwight Dasher - 16/25, 219 yards, 2 TD
- ULL - Chris Masson - 25/43, 220 yards, TD, INT

Top rushers

- MTSU - D. D. Kyles - 20 carries, 177 yards
- ULL - Yobes Walker - 10 carries, 22 yards

Top receivers

- MTSU - Garrett Andrews - 4 receptions, 80 yards, TD
- ULL - Richie Falgout - 6 receptions, 76 yards

=== Louisiana-Monroe ===
Louisiana-Monroe at Louisiana-Lafayette – Game summary

Quarter	1	2	3	4	Total
Warhawks	0	10	7	0	17
Ragin' Cajuns	7	7	0	7	21

at Cajun Field, Lafayette, LA

- Date: November 21
- Game time: 6:00 p.m. CST
- Game weather: 54 °F (12 °C); cloudy and humid
- Game attendance: 8,689
- Referee: Riley Johnson

Game information

First quarter

- ULL - Yobes Walker 1-yard TD run, Tyler Albrecht kick good, 12:03 (ULL 7-0)

Second quarter

- ULM - Trey Revell 4-yard TD run, Radi Jabour kick good, 12:34 (TIE 7-7)
- ULM - Jabour 32-yard field goal, 3:21 (ULM 10-7)
- ULL - Brad McGuire 1-yard TD run, Albrecht kick good, 0:12 (ULL 14-10)

Third quarter

- ULM - Keavon Milton 11-yard TD pass from Revell, Jabour kick good, 2:41 (ULM 17-14)

Fourth quarter

- ULL - McGuire 1-yard TD run, Albrecht kick good, 7:16 (ULL 21-17)

Top passers

- ULL - Chris Masson - 16/27, 252 yards
- ULM - Trey Revell - 8/12, 91 yards, TD, 2 INT

Top rushers

- ULL - Marlin Miller - 11 carries, 33 yards
- ULM - Frank Goodin - 22 carries, 108 yards

Top receivers

- ULL - Ladarius Green - 7 receptions, 131 yards
- ULM - Darrell McNeal - 4 receptions, 51 yards

=== Troy ===
Troy at Louisiana-Lafayette – Game summary

Quarter	1	2	3	4	Total
Trojans	14	10	0	24	48
Ragin' Cajuns	0	13	12	6	31

at Cajun Field, Lafayette, LA

- Date: November 28
- Game time: 6:00 p.m. CST
- Game attendance: 12,245

Game information

First quarter

- TROY - Shawn Southward 3-yard TD run, Michael Taylor kick good, 12:50 (TROY 7-0)
- TROY - Jason Bruce 17-yard TD pass from Levi Brown, Taylor kick good, 3:49 (TROY 14-0)

Second quarter

- TROY - Taylor 31-yard field goal, 14:15 (TROY 17-0)
- TROY - Southward 23-yard TD run, Taylor kick good, 12:07 (TROY 24-0)
- ULL - Brad McGuire 6-yard TD run, Tyler Albrecht kick good, 6:31 (TROY 24-7)
- ULL - Luke Aubrey 57-yard TD pass from Chris Masson, Albrecht kick no good, 4:30 (TROY 24-13)

Third quarter

- ULL - Ladarius Green 1-yard TD pass from McGuire, Albrecht kick no good, 8:08 (TROY 24-19)
- ULL - Green 91-yard TD pass from McGuire, Albrecht kick no good, 4:11 (ULL 25-24)

Fourth quarter

- TROY - Taylor 26-yard field goal, 13:01 (TROY 27-25)
- TROY - Tebiarus Gill 14-yard TD pass from Brown, Taylor kick good, 10:44 (TROY 34-25)
- TROY - Jerrel Jernigan 26-yard TD pass from Brown, Taylor kick good, 4:47 (TROY 41-25)
- ULL - Vernon Wolfe 9-yard TD pass from Blaine Gautier, Albrecht kick no good, 2:16 (TROY 41-31)
- TROY - Bryan Willis 38-yard onside kick returned for TD, Taylor kick good, 2:10 (TROY 48-31)

Top passers

- TROY - Levi Brown - 20/31, 293 yards, 3 TD, INT
- ULL - Chris Masson - 16/25, 187 yards, TD, INT

Top rushers

- TROY - Shawn Southward - 15 carries, 152 yards, 2 TD
- ULL - Marlin Miller - 5 carries, 42 yards

Top receivers

- TROY - Jerrel Jernigan - 5 receptions, 142 yards, TD
- ULL - Luke Aubrey - 7 receptions, 130 yards, TD
