= Alfred Morris (American football) =

American football player (born 1988)

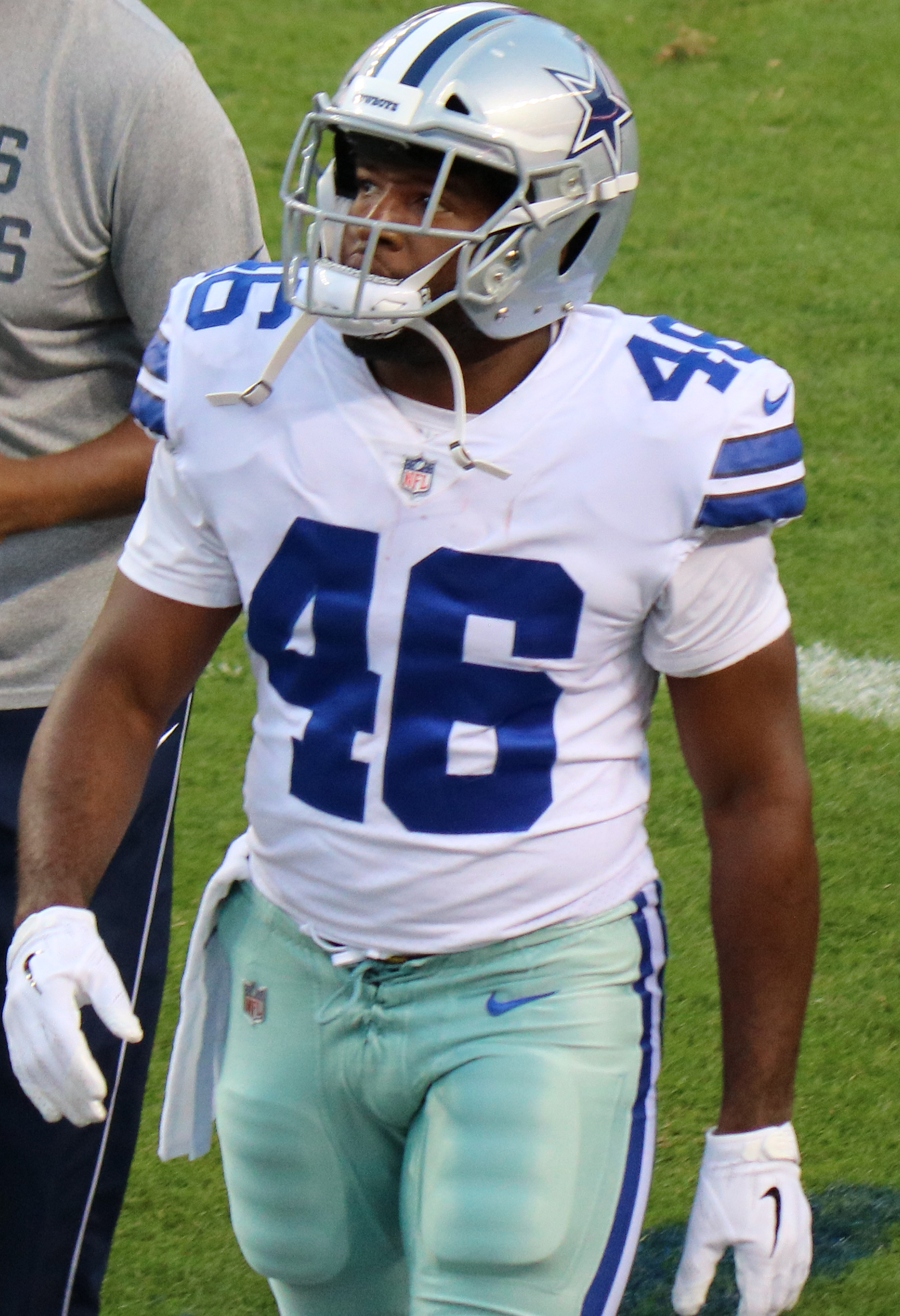
- Morris with the Dallas Cowboys in 2017

No. 46, 36, 41
- Position: Running back

Personal information
- Born: December 12, 1988 (age 37); Pensacola, Florida, U.S.
- Listed height: 5 ft 10 in (1.78 m)
- Listed weight: 222 lb (101 kg)

Career information
- High school: Pine Forest (Pensacola)
- College: Florida Atlantic (2008–2011)
- NFL draft: 2012: 6th round, 173rd overall pick

Career history
- Washington Redskins (2012–2015); Dallas Cowboys (2016–2017); San Francisco 49ers (2018); Dallas Cowboys (2019)*; Arizona Cardinals (2019); New York Giants (2020)
- * Offseason or practice squad member only

Awards and highlights
- Second-team All-Pro (2012); 2× Pro Bowl (2013, 2014); PFWA All-Rookie Team (2012); 2× First-team All-Sun Belt (2009, 2010); Second-team All-Sun Belt (2011)

Career NFL statistics
- Rushing yards: 6,173
- Rushing average: 4.3
- Rushing touchdowns: 35
- Receptions: 68
- Receiving yards: 513
- Receiving touchdowns: 1
- Stats at Pro Football Reference

Alfred Bruce Morris (born December 12, 1988) is an American former professional football player who was a running back in the National Football League (NFL). He played college football for the Florida Atlantic Owls and was selected by the Washington Redskins in the sixth round of the 2012 NFL draft. Morris also played for the San Francisco 49ers, Dallas Cowboys, Arizona Cardinals, and New York Giants.

== Early life ==
Morris attended Pine Forest High School in Pensacola, Florida, where he was a letterman in football, basketball, and track. In football, Morris saw action on both sides of the ball. As a senior, he rushed for 1,049 yards with 17 touchdowns and added 147 tackles and five interceptions on defense. Morris was named North West Florida MVP, first-team All-State and was a game MVP. He also participated in the PSA All-Star Game. Academically, Morris was named the student-athlete of the month for Pine Forest. When he was in the sixth grade, Morris played youth football against future Pensacola football stars, wide receiver Doug Baldwin, and running back Trent Richardson. Morris and Richardson met again in their rookie seasons as the Redskins would travel to Cleveland to take on the Browns.

In track, Morris was one of the state's top performers in the jumping events. At the 2007 FHSAA 1A-2A Outdoor State Finals, he earned a tenth-place finish in the triple jump event, after clearing a career-best mark of 13.40 meters. Morris also got a PR of 6.48 meters in the long jump and ran the 200 meters in 23.46 seconds.

== College career ==
Morris attended and played college football for Florida Atlantic from 2008 to 2011.

In the 2008 season, Morris had seven rushes for 23 yards in very little action.

In the 2009 season, his role in the offense expanded. On September 26, against Louisiana-Monroe, Morris had 122 rushing yards and a touchdown. On October 17, against North Texas, he had 147 rushing yards and two rushing touchdowns. The following week against Louisiana-Lafayette, Morris had 181 rushing yards, two rushing touchdowns, and a 38-yard reception. On November 14 against Arkansas State, he had 117 rushing yards, two rushing touchdowns, and a 17-yard receiving touchdown. The following week, in a game at Troy, Morris had 137 rushing yards and a rushing touchdown. During the regular season finale against Florida International, he had 158 rushing yards, two rushing touchdowns, and an eight-yard receiving touchdown. Overall, in the 2009 season, Morris ran the ball 236 times for 1,392 yards. He also scored 11 touchdowns with a career long run of 48 yards.

Morris started the 2010 season with 103 rushing yards and a rushing touchdown against UAB. On October 9 against Louisiana-Monroe, he had 153 rushing yards and two rushing touchdowns. On November 13 against Louisiana-Lafayette, Morris had 143 rushing yards on 22 carries. Overall, in the 2010 season, he rushed the ball 227 times while gaining 928 yards averaging 4.1 yards-per-carry. Morris also scored a rushing touchdown seven times that season.

Morris started his final collegiate season slowly with 14 carries for 16 yards against the Florida Gators. After a tough outing against Michigan State, Morris had 85 rushing yards and four receptions for 43 yards and a touchdown against Auburn. On October 8 against North Texas, he had 162 rushing yards, one rushing touchdown, and three receptions for 51 yards. On November 5 against Arkansas State, Morris had 163 rushing yards and two rushing touchdowns. Two weeks later against Troy, he had 101 rushing yards and a rushing touchdown. In the penultimate game of the season against UAB, Morris had 198 rushing yards and four rushing touchdowns. Overall, in the 2011 season, he had 235 carries for 1,186 yards and nine touchdowns to go along with 15 receptions for 139 yards and a touchdown.

== Professional career ==
Pre-draft measurables
Height	Weight	Arm length	Hand span	40-yard dash	10-yard split	20-yard split	20-yard shuttle	Three-cone drill	Vertical jump	Broad jump	Bench press
5 ft 9 7/8 in (1.77 m)	219 lb (99 kg)	31 3/8 in (0.80 m)	10 1/4 in (0.26 m)	4.67 s	1.60 s	2.55 s	4.19 s	7.01 s	35.5 in (0.90 m)	9 ft 9 in (2.97 m)	16 reps
All values from NFL Combine

=== Washington Redskins ===
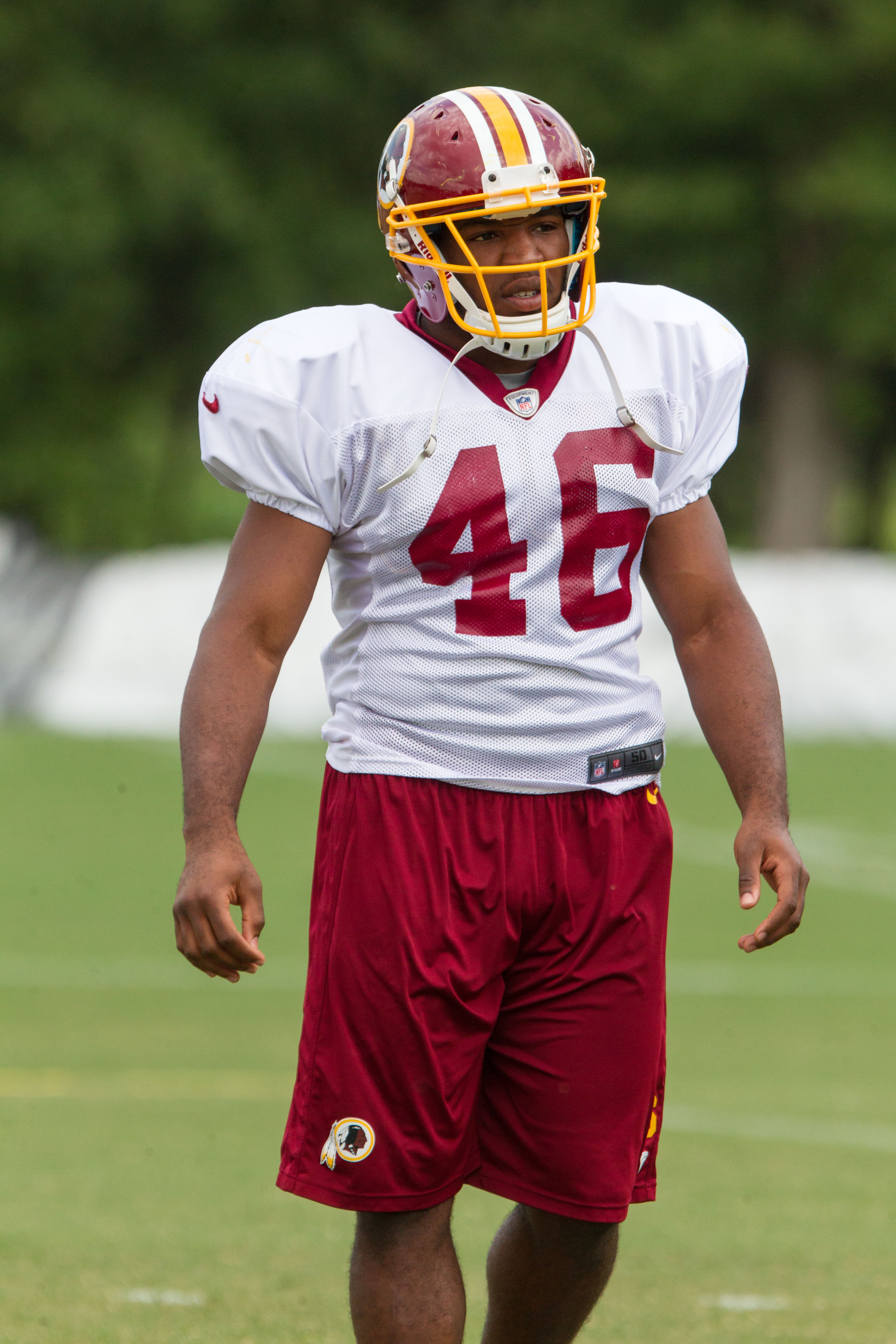
Morris at training camp in 2012

==== 2012 season ====
Morris was selected in the sixth round of the 2012 NFL draft with the 173rd overall pick by the Washington Redskins. The sixth-round draft pick that Washington selected him with was from a trade on July 27, 2011, from the Vikings for Donovan McNabb. Morris was officially signed by the Redskins to a four-year, $2.22 million contract with a $154,000 signing bonus on May 6, 2012. After having impressive preseason performances, where he started two out of four of the Redskins' preseason games, he emerged as a dark horse in the running back competition with Roy Helu, Evan Royster, and Tim Hightower. Morris was guaranteed a spot on the final 53-man roster for the start of the 2012 season after sitting out of the last preseason game against the Tampa Bay Buccaneers with the rest of the Redskins' starters.

The day before the season opener, head coach Mike Shanahan announced that Morris would be the starting running back. In his NFL debut and first career start, Morris rushed for 96 yards on 28 carries and scored two touchdowns against the New Orleans Saints. Despite the Redskins losing to the Cincinnati Bengals in Week 3, Morris put on a great display, recording 78 rushing yards on 17 carries and scoring a touchdown, and was even nominated for NFL Rookie of the Week. The next week against the Tampa Bay Buccaneers, he had his first 100-yard game; recording 113 yards on 21 carries and one touchdown. During Week 5 against the Atlanta Falcons, Morris rushed for his second career 100-yard game. He was named Rookie of the Week after his performance in Week 7 against the New York Giants, where he rushed for 120 yards on 22 carries. Morris later had three consecutive 100-yard performances starting in the Week 12 game against the Dallas Cowboys on Thanksgiving. Morris would be named Rookie of the Week for the second time after his performance against the Baltimore Ravens in Week 14.

In the final game of the regular season, Morris ran 33 times for 200 yards and three touchdowns, setting two new Redskins franchise records. His effort helped lead the Redskins to a 28–18 victory over their division rivals, the Cowboys, to win the NFC East for the first time since 1999 and earn a playoff spot for the first time since 2007. In the Wild Card Round against the Seattle Seahawks, Morris had 16 carries for 80 yards in the 24–14 loss. Finishing the season with a total of 1,613 rushing yards and 13 touchdowns, he broke Clinton Portis' rushing record for a single-season of 1,516 yards and Charley Taylor's record of most touchdowns scored in his rookie season of ten touchdowns. Morris also became the fourth player in NFL history to ever record over 1,600 rushing yards in his rookie year; ultimately ranking third behind Eric Dickerson and George Rogers.

With Morris' 1,613 rushing yards combined with 815 rushing yards attained by Robert Griffin III, the two rookies accounted for 90% of the Redskins' total rushing yards for the 2012 regular season, which led the Redskins to finish first in the league in rushing. In the regular season, he also finished second in the league in total rushing yards, only behind Adrian Peterson, and ranked second in rushing touchdowns behind Arian Foster. He was named to the PFWA All-Rookie Team.

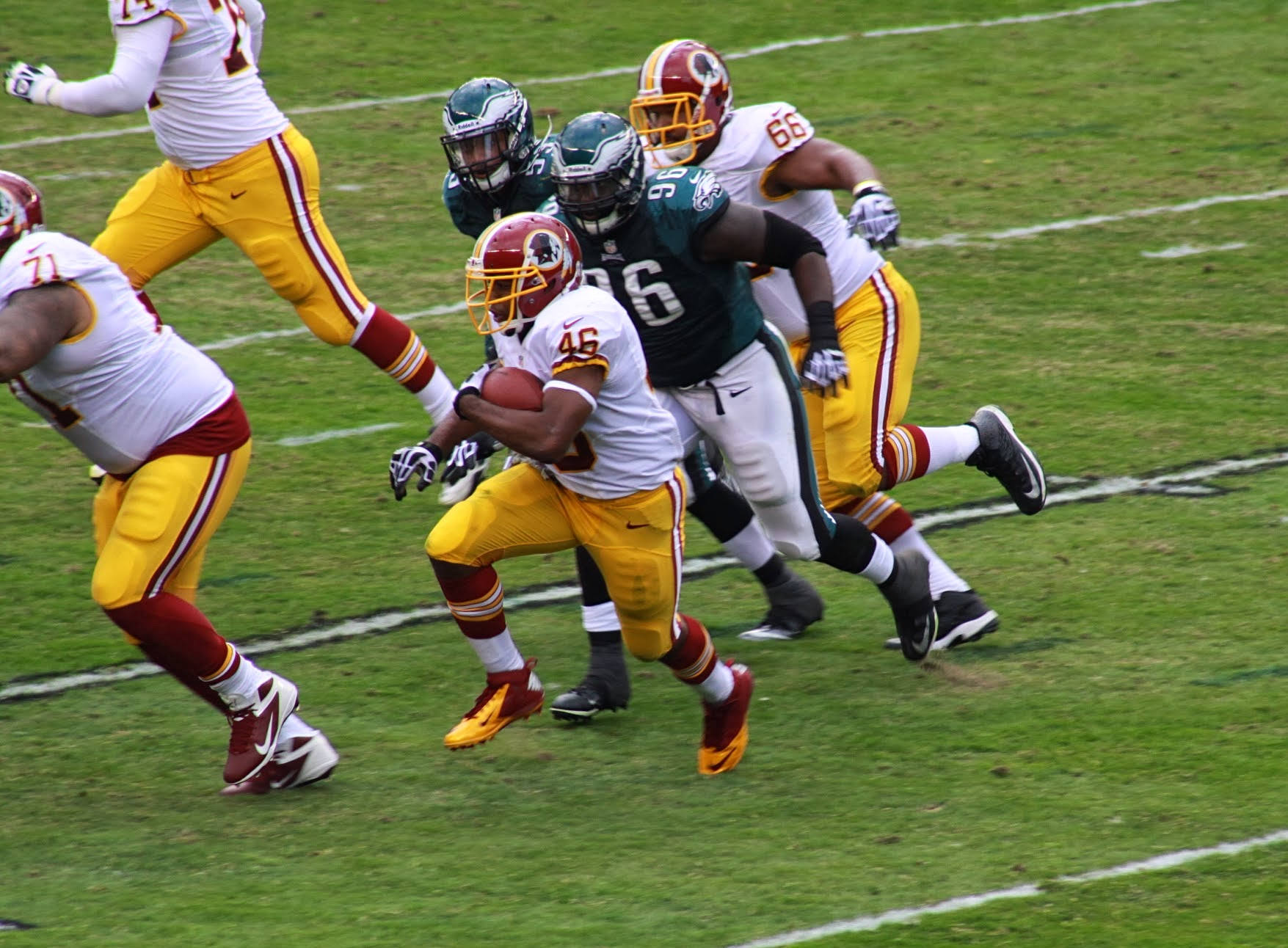
Morris rushing in 2013

==== 2013 season ====
Prior to the 2013 season, Morris was named to the NFL Network's NFL Top 100 Players of 2013 by his fellow players at #64 On September 9, 2013, Morris ran for 45 yards on 12 carries and a touchdown in the season opener against the Philadelphia Eagles. On September 15, 2013, Morris ran for 107 yards on 13 carries against the Green Bay Packers. On September 22, 2013, Morris ran for 73 yards on 15 carries and a touchdown against the Detroit Lions. On September 29, 2013, Morris ran for 71 yards on 16 carries against the Oakland Raiders. It was reported that Morris suffered a rib contusion. On October 13, 2013, Morris ran for 81 yards on 16 carries and a touchdown against the Dallas Cowboys. On October 20, 2013, Morris ran for 95 yards on 19 carries against the Chicago Bears. On October 27, 2013, Morris ran for 93 yards on 17 carries and a touchdown against the Denver Broncos. On November 3, 2013, Morris ran for 121 yards on 25 carries and a touchdown against the San Diego Chargers. On November 7, 2013, Morris ran for a season-high 139 yards on 26 carries against the Minnesota Vikings. On November 17, 2013, Morris ran for 93 yards on 22 carries against the Philadelphia Eagles. On December 1, 2013, Morris scored his sixth touchdown of the season against the New York Giants. On December 15, 2013, Morris ran for 98 yards on 18 carries against the Atlanta Falcons. On December 22, 2013, Morris ran for 88 yards on 24 carries against the Dallas Cowboys.

At the end of the 2013 season, Morris finished with 1,275 rushing yards on 276 carries and seven rushing touchdowns and nine receptions for 78 receiving yards. Morris ranked fourth in rushing yards for the 2013 season. On January 17, it was announced that Morris would play in the 2014 Pro Bowl, after originally being selected as an alternate.

==== 2014 season ====
On September 7, 2014, Morris ran for 91 yards on 14 carries against the Houston Texans. On September 14, 2014, Morris ran for 85 yards on 22 carries and two touchdowns against the Jacksonville Jaguars. On September 21, 2014, Morris ran for 77 yards on 23 carries against the Philadelphia Eagles. On September 25, 2014, Morris ran for 63 yards on 12 carries and a touchdown against the New York Giants. On October 27, 2014, Morris ran for 73 yards on 18 carries and a touchdown against the Dallas Cowboys. On November 2, 2014, Morris ran for 92 yards on 19 carries and two touchdowns against the Minnesota Vikings. On November 16, 2014, Morris ran for 96 yards on 20 carries against the Tampa Bay Buccaneers. On November 23, 2014, Morris ran for 125 yards on 21 carries and a touchdown against the San Francisco 49ers. Morris broke 100 rushing yards for the first time in the 2014 season, the last time Morris ran a 100-plus game was November 7, 2013. On December 20, 2014, Morris ran for 83 yards on 21 carries and a touchdown against the Philadelphia Eagles.

Morris finished the 2014 season with 1,074 rushing yards on 265 carries and eight rushing touchdowns along with 155 receiving yards on 17 receptions. Morris achieved his third consecutive season of 1,000+ rushing yards by the end of the 2014 season. With this achievement, he became the fourth running back in the Redskins' franchise history to have at least three 1,000-yard seasons along with John Riggins, Clinton Portis, and Stephen Davis. For the 2014 season, Morris finished ranked 11th in rushing yards and ranked eighth in rushing touchdowns. He went to the 2015 Pro Bowl as an alternate for LeSean McCoy. Morris' 3,962 career rushing yards at that time placed him sixth all-time in Redskins' history, just twelve yards more than Earnest Byner with 3,950.

==== 2015 season ====
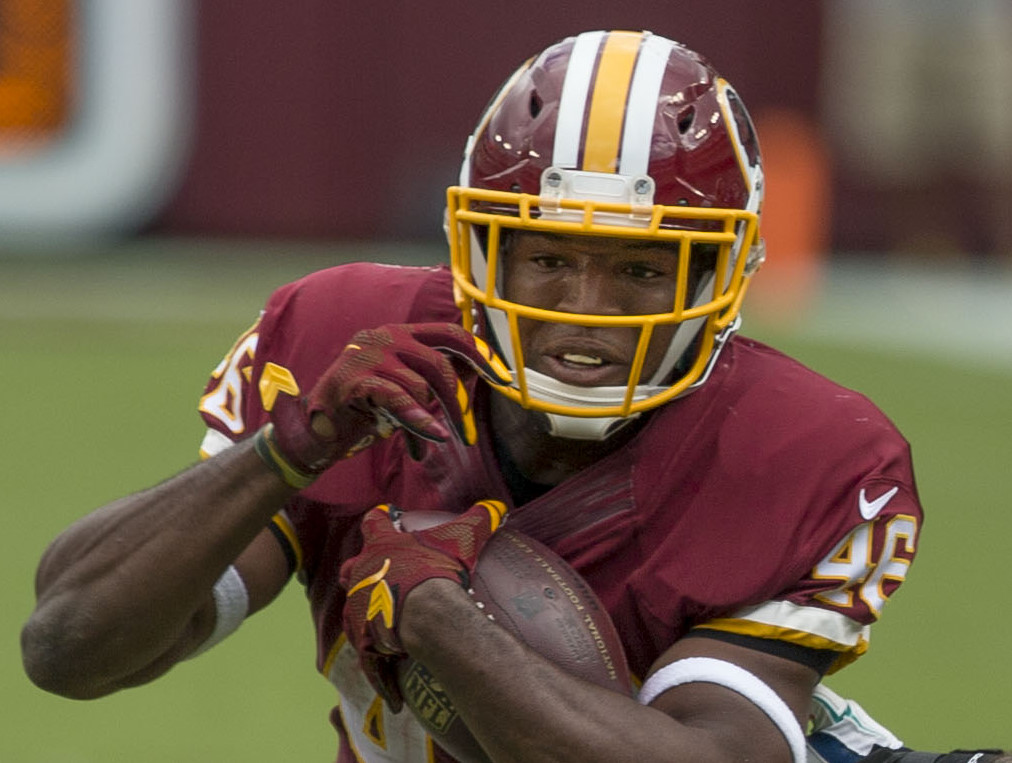
Morris in 2015

Morris remained the starter for the Redskins, splitting carries with rookie Matt Jones and Chris Thompson. The Redskins' rushing scheme in their offense was noticeably poor causing Morris's statistics to be particularly lower compared to his past seasons. On September 13, 2015, Morris ran for a season-high 121 yards on 25 carries against the Miami Dolphins. During the game, Morris was tackled by Ndamukong Suh after a nine-yard gain, and as Suh got up it appeared that he kicked Morris's helmet off, causing major controversy in Suh's first game as a Dolphin. On November 15, 2015, Morris ran for 92 yards on 15 carries against the New Orleans Saints. On November 29, 2015, Morris ran for 78 yards on 23 carries against the New York Giants. On December 13, 2015, Morris scored his first and only touchdown of the season against the Chicago Bears. On January 3, 2016, Morris ran for 100 yards on 19 carries against the Dallas Cowboys. On January 10, 2016, Morris ran for 50 yards on 11 carries in the NFC Wild Card Round loss to the Green Bay Packers.

Morris finished the 2015 season with 751 rushing yards on 202 carries and a touchdown, and 55 receiving yards on 10 catches. Morris's 4,713 career rushing yards jumped him to the 5th-most career rushing yards in Redskins' history, passing Terry Allen with 4,086.

=== Dallas Cowboys (first stint) ===
==== 2016 season ====
On March 22, 2016, Morris signed a two-year, $3.5 million contract with the Dallas Cowboys, with the potential to earn up to $5.5 million. The Cowboys were looking to improve their running back production from the previous year and also drafted Ezekiel Elliott in the first round on April 28. With the emergence of Elliott who became the league's leading rusher, Morris was mostly used on third downs and was forced to focus on his blocking and receiving skills.

On September 11, 2016, Morris made his Cowboys debut, running for 35 yards on seven carries in a 20–19 loss to the New York Giants. On September 18, 2016, Morris scored his first touchdown of the season against the Washington Redskins. On September 25, 2016, Morris scored his second touchdown of the season against the Chicago Bears. On November 6, 2016, Morris ran for a season-high 56 yards on 17 carries against the Cleveland Browns. In Week 15, he was passed on the depth chart after the Cowboys activated Darren McFadden from the non-football injury list. He was declared inactive against the Tampa Bay Buccaneers and Detroit Lions. Morris finished the season with 69 carries for 243 yards and two touchdowns. He was also declared inactive for the Divisional Round loss against the Green Bay Packers.

==== 2017 season ====
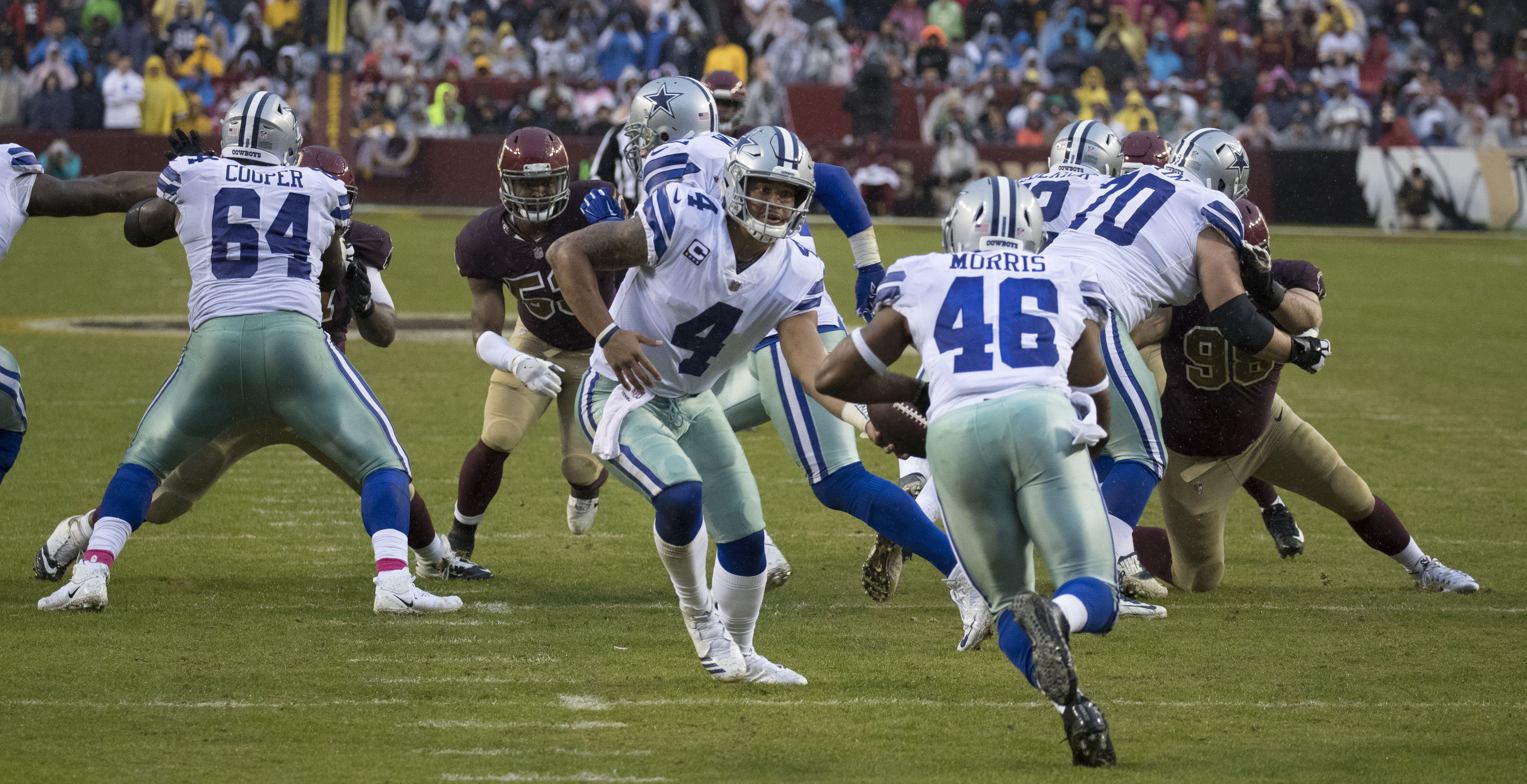
Dak Prescott hands off the ball to Morris during a game against the Redskins in 2017

Morris stayed ahead of McFadden as the backup for Ezekiel Elliott. He became the starting running back in Week 10, when Elliott began serving a six-game suspension for violating the NFL personal conduct policy.

On Thursday Night Football in Week 13, Morris faced against his former team, the Washington Redskins. He finished the game with 127 rushing yards, supporting the Cowboys dramatically to a 38–14 win.

He returned to a backup role in Week 16. During Elliott's absence, he was the team's leading rusher, contributing to the running game and remaining efficient although not dominating, while posting 99 carries for 430 yards (4.3-yard average). Overall, Morris finished the 2017 season with 115 carries for 547 rushing yards (4.8-yard average), a rushing touchdown, and seven receptions for 45 yards.

=== San Francisco 49ers ===
On August 13, 2018, Morris signed with the San Francisco 49ers. He was named the starting running back when Jerick McKinnon went down with a torn ACL. In his first start, he logged 38 yards on 12 carries against the Minnesota Vikings in Week 1. In the regular season finale against the Los Angeles Rams, he had 111 rushing yards and a rushing touchdown. Overall, he finished the 2018 season with 428 rushing yards and two rushing touchdowns.

=== Dallas Cowboys (second stint) ===
On July 29, 2019, Morris signed with the Cowboys to ensure experienced veteran depth at the running back position, amid the holdout from Ezekiel Elliott. After Elliott received a contract extension, the Cowboys released Morris on September 7.

=== Arizona Cardinals ===
On October 22, 2019, Morris signed with the Arizona Cardinals. He was released 10 days later.

=== New York Giants ===
On September 29, 2020, the New York Giants signed Morris to their practice squad, to provide depth after Saquon Barkley was lost for the season with a torn ACL in his right knee. Morris reunited with offensive coordinator Jason Garrett, who was his head coach with the Cowboys.

Morris was elevated to the active roster on November 2, 2020, for the team's Week 8 game against the Tampa Bay Buccaneers. He was reverted to the practice squad following the game and was elevated again on November 7 for the Week 9 game against the Washington Football Team. Morris reverted to the practice squad again following the game, and he was promoted to the active roster on November 13.

Morris spent most of the season with Dion Lewis as backups to Wayne Gallman. He finished the season playing in nine games, rushing 55 times for 238 yards and a touchdown along with three receptions for 19 yards and a touchdown.

Morris re-signed with the Giants on August 2, 2021. He was released on August 16, 2021.

== Career statistics ==
=== NFL ===
==== Regular season ====
Year	Team	Games		Rushing					Receiving					Fumbles	
Year	Team	GP	GS	Att	Yds	Avg	Lng	TD	Rec	Yds	Avg	Lng	TD	Fum	Lost
2012	WAS	16	16	335	1,613	4.8	39T	13	11	77	7.0	20	0	4	3
2013	WAS	16	16	276	1,275	4.6	45T	7	9	78	8.7	17	0	5	4
2014	WAS	16	16	265	1,074	4.1	30	8	17	155	9.1	26	0	2	1
2015	WAS	16	16	202	751	3.7	48	1	10	55	5.5	12	0	0	0
2016	DAL	14	0	69	243	3.5	17	2	3	11	3.7	6	0	0	0
2017	DAL	14	5	115	547	4.8	70	1	7	45	6.4	13	0	0	0
2018	SF	12	1	111	428	3.9	51	2	8	73	9.1	16	0	2	1
2019	ARI	1	0	1	4	4.0	4	0	0	0	0	0	0	0	0
2020	NYG	9	0	55	238	4.3	20	1	3	19	6.3	9	1	0	0
Total		114	70	1,429	6,173	4.3	70	35	68	513	7.5	26	1	13	9

==== Postseason ====
Year	Team	Games		Rushing					Receiving					Fumbles	
Year	Team	GP	GS	Att	Yds	Avg	Lng	TD	Rec	Yds	Avg	Lng	TD	Fum	Lost
2012	WAS	1	1	16	80	5.0	18	0	0	0	0.0	0	0	0	0
2015	WAS	1	1	11	50	4.5	19	0	0	0	0.0	0	0	0	0
Total		2	2	27	130	4.8	19	0	0	0	0	0	0	0	0

=== College ===
Season	Team	GP	Rushing					
Season	Team	GP	Att	Yds	Avg	Lng	TD	Y/G
2008	Florida Atlantic	13	7	23	3.3	9	0	2.1
2009	Florida Atlantic	12	263	1,392	5.3	48	11	116.0
2010	Florida Atlantic	12	227	928	4.1	38	7	77.3
2011	Florida Atlantic	12	235	1,186	5.1	48	9	99.0
Total		49	732	3,529	4.8	48	27	75.1

== Personal life ==
Morris is the son of Ronald and Yvonne Morris. He has six brothers. Morris is a Christian.

Despite being able to afford a new car, he still drives his 1991 Mazda 626, which he nicknamed "Bentley". He drove this car from Boca Raton, Florida, to his new D.C. home. Due to the positive publicity, Mazda refurbished the car free of charge. As part of the refurbishment, the car received a new radio featuring a CD player and a navigation system but otherwise was restored to factory floor condition. Mazda later launched a similar program in 2017 for Japanese owners of the first generation Mazda MX-5.
