= 2009 Middle Tennessee Blue Raiders football team =

American college football season

2009 Middle Tennessee Blue Raiders football

New Orleans Bowl champion

New Orleans Bowl, W 42–32 vs. Southern Miss
- Conference: Sun Belt Conference
- Record: 10–3 (7–1 Sun Belt)
- Head coach: Rick Stockstill (4th season)
- Offensive coordinator: Tony Franklin (1st season)
- Offensive scheme: Air raid
- Defensive coordinator: Manny Diaz (4th season)
- Base defense: 4–3
- Home stadium: Johnny "Red" Floyd Stadium

2009 Sun Belt Conference football standings
	Conf.			Overall
Team	W		L	W		L
Troy $	8	–	0	9	–	4
Middle Tennessee	7	–	1	10	–	3
Louisiana–Monroe	5	–	3	6	–	6
Florida Atlantic	5	–	3	5	–	7
Louisiana–Lafayette	4	–	4	6	–	6
Arkansas State	3	–	5	4	–	8
FIU	3	–	5	3	–	9
North Texas	1	–	7	2	–	10
Western Kentucky	0	–	8	0	–	12
$ – Conference champion

The 2009 Middle Tennessee Blue Raiders football team represented Middle Tennessee State University as a member of the Sun Belt Conference during the 2009 NCAA Division I FBS football season. Led by fourth-year head coach Rick Stockstill, the Blue Raiders compiled an overall record 10–3 with a mark of 7–1 in conference play, placing second in the Sun Belt. The team played home games at Johnny "Red" Floyd Stadium in Murfreesboro, Tennessee.

In February 2009, Tony Franklin, former Troy and Auburn offensive coordinator, was hired to fill the vacant position of offensive coordinator at. He replaced G. A. Mangus, who left Middle Tennessee to become the quarterbacks coach at South Carolina.

The 2009 schedule featured an opener at Clemson on September 5. The game was followed by an in-state rivalry game against Conference USA member Memphis at Johnny "Red" Floyd Stadium. The Blue Raiders returned to Maryland for a third time, and hosted their first ever Southeastern Conference (SEC) opponent, Mississippi State, in school history. Mississippi State was the third Power Five conference opponent, following Virginia in 2007 and Maryland in 2008, to visit Middle Tennessee.

Middle Tennessee ended the regular season with a 9–3 overall record, the best since 1992. The Blue Raiders accepted an invitation to the New Orleans Bowl to face Southern Miss, coached by former Blue Raider offensive coordinator, Larry Fedora. This was the second bowl game for the Blue Raiders in four years. The Blue Raiders won 42–32 for their first FBS bowl win in school history, becoming the first team in Sun Belt Conference history to win ten games in a season.

== Schedule ==
Date	Time	Opponent	Site	TV	Result	Attendance
September 5	5:00 pm	at Clemson*	Memorial Stadium; Clemson, SC	ESPN360	L 14–37	78,371
September 12	6:00 pm	Memphis*	Johnny "Red" Floyd Stadium; Murfreesboro, TN	CSS	W 31–14	28,105
September 19	2:30 pm	at Maryland*	Maryland Stadium; College Park, MD	ESPN360	W 32–31	43,167
September 26	6:00 pm	at North Texas	Fouts Field; Denton, TX		W 37–21	22,346
October 6	7:00 pm	at Troy	Movie Gallery Stadium; Troy, AL (Battle for the Palladium)	ESPN2	L 7–31	17,108
October 17	11:30 am	Mississippi State*	Johnny "Red" Floyd Stadium; Murfreesboro, TN	ESPNU	L 6–27	23,882
October 24	2:30 pm	Western Kentucky^{†}	Johnny "Red" Floyd Stadium; Murfreesboro, Tennessee (rivalry)	CSS	W 62–24	17,787
October 31	3:00 pm	at Florida Atlantic	Lockhart Stadium; Fort Lauderdale, Florida		W 27–20	15,568
November 7	3:30 pm	FIU	Johnny "Red" Floyd Stadium; Murfreesboro, TN	ESPN360	W 48–21	17,808
November 14	3:15 pm	Louisiana–Lafayette	Johnny "Red" Floyd Stadium; Murfreesboro, TN	CSS	W 34–17	16,411
November 21	3:30 pm	Arkansas State	Johnny "Red" Floyd Stadium; Murfreesboro, TN	ESPN360	W 38–14	19,111
November 28	3:15 pm	at Louisiana–Monroe	Malone Stadium; Monroe, LA	CSS	W 38–19	11,896
December 20	7:30 pm	vs. Southern Miss*	Louisiana Superdome; New Orleans, LA (New Orleans Bowl)	ESPN	W 42–32	30,228
*Non-conference game; ^{†}Homecoming; All times are in Eastern time

== Game summaries ==
=== Clemson ===
	1	2	3	4	Total
Blue Raiders	0	7	7	0	14
Tigers	10	20	7	0	37

Middle Tennessee fell behind early and could not recover in dropping its season opener, 37-14, to host Clemson as the 95th season of Blue Raider football kicked off Saturday evening in front a crowd of 75,000 at Memorial Stadium in Clemson, South Carolina The final score was the same as the only other meeting in the series, September 13, 2003.

Dasher eclipsed the 200-yard barrier through the air for the third time in his career with 204 yards on 20-of-42. His 43-yard strike to Blissard was the longest for the Blue Raiders in the game.

Dasher also finished as the team leader with 61 yards on the ground. Middle Tennessee could not get much of a ground attack going, finishing with 92 yards on 37 carries for a 2.5-yard average. Blissard was the MT leader with 68 yards receiving in his first game as a Blue Raider.

=== Memphis ===
	1	2	3	4	Total
Tigers	7	0	0	7	14
Blue Raiders	7	10	7	7	31

Blackout proved once again to be a winning theme for the Middle Tennessee football team as they rode the back of quarterback Dwight Dasher in earning its first victory of the season, a 31–14 decision against Memphis, in front of a Floyd Stadium-record 28,105 in attendance in the home opener in Murfreesboro, Tenn., Saturday evening. It kicked off the 74th season of Blue Raider football at its home venue and surpassed the previous stadium attendance mark of 27,568 against Tennessee State September 5, 1998.

Dasher ended the contest with 320 combined yards, including an 18-of-26 and two touchdown effort through the air. He also had a team-best outing of 17 carries for 89 yards on the ground, outgaining the Tiger offense by himself by 101 yards. Through the first two games, Dasher has accounted for 585 of the team's 735 total yards, an 80.0 percentage.

=== Maryland ===
	1	2	3	4	Total
Blue Raiders	0	13	10	9	32
Terrapins	7	7	7	10	31

"Middle Tennessee's Alan Gendreau hit a 19-yard field goal as time expired, silencing the crowd of 43,167 at Byrd Stadium in College Park, Maryland", reported Blueraiders.com, "as the Blue Raiders defeated Maryland for the second-straight season, 32-31, in a see-saw thriller. It gave Middle Tennessee its first road victory over a BCS-conference opponent since 2005 when it defeated Vanderbilt. The game-winning drive covered 73 yards on eight plays, as quarterback Dwight Dasher was 4-of-4 for 65 yards, including a 35-yard strike to Chris McClover to take the Blue Raiders down to the Terrapin 10-yard line. Dasher completed the contest 27-of-44 for a career-high 324 yards and two touchdowns. He also had one score on the ground. D.D. Kyles paced the Blue Raider ground attack with only 34 yards, while McClover was the leading receiver with seven catches for 110 yards."

=== North Texas ===
	1	2	3	4	Total
Blue Raiders	10	20	0	7	37
Mean Green	7	0	14	0	21

Middle Tennessee football opened Sun Belt action by winning its third-straight game and improved on its best start in eight years with a 37–21 victory at North Texas Saturday evening in front of 22,346 at Fouts Field in Denton, Texas. The three-game winning streak is the first for the Blue Raiders since they won three late last season, while the 3-1 start is the second best in the school's FBS (1999–present) era, following the 4-0 opening by the 2001 squad.

Dasher finished with his fourth-straight 200-plus passing outing, completing 21-of-43 for 269 yards and two touchdowns. He was also the team's leading rusher with 75 yards on 16 carries and two scores. Sancho McDonald led the squad with 74 yards receiving on five receptions.

Derrick Crumpton paced the defense with eight tackles, leading topping Alex Suber's seven. The defense forced 5 turnovers, while Middle Tennessee had no turnovers.

=== Troy ===
	1	2	3	4	Total
Blue Raiders	0	0	7	0	7
Trojans	7	7	10	7	31

Middle Tennessee could only score once, a third-quarter touchdown, and host Troy rolled to a 31–7 win in front of a crowd of 17,108 at Movie Gallery Stadium in Troy, Ala., plus countless others watching live nationally on ESPN2 Tuesday night.

Dwight Dasher entered play tonight ranked sixth nationally in total offense and first in touches per game. After a slow start, Dasher rebounded to account for 298 yards of Middle Tennessee total yardage of 354. Dasher, who went over the 200-yard passing mark for the fifth straight game, finished with 56 total touches, just shy of his national-leading 56.75 average coming into the game.

=== Mississippi State ===
	1	2	3	4	Total
Bulldogs	7	10	3	7	27
Blue Raiders	0	6	0	0	6

Missed opportunities in the red zone and second half turnovers were the story Saturday as host Middle Tennessee was held out of the end zone in a 27–6 loss to Mississippi State in front of 23,882 fans at Floyd Stadium on cold and blustery Hall of Fame Day in Murfreesboro, Tenn. Mississippi State was the first Southeastern Conference opponent to make an appearance at Floyd Stadium.

Mississippi State controlled the line of scrimmage with a 333–248 advantage on total yards, including a 178–42 edge on the ground. Dixon finished with a game-high 135 yards on 27 carries with two scores, while Lee added 38 yards. Lee was 14-of-20 through the air for 155 yards.

Dasher was the team's leading ball carrier with 47 yards, while he completed 50.0 percent of his passes (11-of-22) for 129 yards.

=== Western Kentucky ===
	1	2	3	4	Total
Hilltoppers	3	7	7	7	24
Blue Raiders	3	28	17	14	62

Dwight Dasher's career day on a record-breaking afternoon spurred Middle Tennessee football to a 62–24 win over rival Western Kentucky in front of 17,787 on a cool Homecoming outing at Floyd Stadium in Murfreesboro, Tenn. Dasher finished 22-of-35 for 355 yards and three scores, the eighth-highest passing day in school history. He added two more scores on the ground as the Blue Raiders scored the most points and gained the most yards (646) under head coach Rick Stockstill (2006–present).

Middle Tennessee churned out 646 yards of offense and 62 points in the win over WKU. The yardage total went down as the most under Rick Stockstill, breaking the previous best mark of 555 yards set against Louisville in 2007. The 62 points also went down as the most ever by a Rick Stockstill coached team and the most by the Blue Raiders since they put up 70 in a win over Idaho on Oct. 6, 2001. The 646 yards rank third on the program's all-time list and is the second most Middle Tennessee has put up in a Sun Belt Conference game, trailing only that Idaho game when the Blue Raiders gained 685 yards.

=== Florida Atlantic ===
	1	2	3	4	Total
Blue Raiders	7	6	0	14	27
Owls	10	7	0	3	20

Quarterback Dwight Dasher sprinted for a career-long 74-yard touchdown run late in the fourth quarter to provide the winning difference in a come-from-behind 27-20 Middle Tennessee victory at Florida Atlantic Saturday afternoon in Sun Belt action. The Owls had one last chance, but a fourth-down pass was ruled out-of-bounds, ending the thriller on Halloween in front of 15,568 fans at Lockhart Stadium in Fort Lauderdale, Florida

Dasher's career-best dash with 5:31 remaining gave the Blue Raiders a pair of players over the 100-yard barrier, as he finished with 108, trailing only the 140 accumulated by teammate D.D. Kyles, who made his second career start.

Danny Carmichael led the Blue Raider defense with a career-high 15 tackles, while Cam Robinson added a career-best 14 stops. Kevin Brown and Kellem each registered 10 tackles for Middle Tennessee.

The Blue Raiders' capitalized on a blocked punt by SaCoby Carter for their first score, with only 43 seconds remaining in the first quarter. Sherman Neal grabbed the loose ball behind punter Mickey Groody and returned it 29 yards to bring Middle Tennessee (5-3, 3-1 Sun Belt) within three, 10-7. The next punt did not fare much better for the Owls. The snap went high, forcing Groody to roll to his left, and Neal was in the backfield to record the tackle. It gave the Blue Raiders the ball on the Owl 37. Jeremy Kellem was able to get a hand on a Groody punt halfway through the period to raise the blocked kick total to three, the highest by a Middle Tennessee team since the Blue Raiders matched the effort in 2002 against North Texas.

=== FIU ===
	1	2	3	4	Total
Golden Panthers	0	7	14	0	21
Blue Raiders	17	17	0	14	48

Middle Tennessee tallied 34 unanswered points behind a strong performance on the ground, led by quarterback Dwight Dasher, and was able to hold on for a 48–21 win Saturday afternoon against visiting FIU in front of 17,808 at Floyd Stadium in Murfreesboro, Tenn. The victory secures bowl eligibility for the Blue Raiders with three games remaining in the regular season.

Middle Tennessee finished with 385 rushing yards, the fourth-highest total in a school history, and the third-straight contest in which the Blue Raiders surpassed the 200-yard plateau. Dasher ended the game with 178 yards on the ground, while adding 182 through the air on 13-of-28 and two touchdowns. For the year, Dasher now has 2,029 yards passing and 703 yards rushing.

With Middle Tennessee's win over FIU ran its record to 6-3 which is the best start to a season since 2006 when the Blue Raiders competed in the Motor City Bowl. The six wins now make Middle Tennessee bowl eligible.

=== Louisiana–Lafayette ===
	1	2	3	4	Total
Ragin' Cajuns	7	10	0	0	17
Blue Raiders	7	7	10	10	34

Defense and quarterback Dwight Dasher turned up the intensity in the second half as Middle Tennessee won its fourth straight with a 34–17 victory Saturday against Louisiana–Lafayette in front of 16,411 at Floyd Stadium in Murfreesboro, Tenn.

The Blue Raider defense sacked Ragin' Cajun quarterback Chris Masson five times, one more instance than the Louisiana–Lafayette offense had allowed all season, tying for the fewest in the nation entering the contest. The Ragin' Cajuns were held to only 75 yards in the second half.

Dasher finished 16-of-25 for 219 yards and two touchdowns, leading Middle Tennessee to four scores on seven drives in the final 30 minutes after trailing by three at halftime.

This win was the sixth time Middle Tennessee has come-from-behind for a victory under head coach Rick Stockstill. It is the third instance it happened this year with the Blue Raiders pulling out triumphs on the road at Maryland and at FAU.

=== Arkansas State ===
	1	2	3	4	Total
Red Wolves	0	7	0	7	14
Blue Raiders	17	7	14	0	38

It was "Senior Day" at Middle Tennessee but a standout underclassman continued to steal headlines on the field as the Blue Raiders capped the home portion of their schedule with an emphatic 38-14 win against visiting Arkansas State in front of 19,111 at Floyd Stadium Saturday.

Junior quarterback Dwight Dasher threw touchdowns to four different players to lead a Blue Raider offense that piled up 427 yards and dominated the Red Wolves from the opening quarter. Dasher finished with 263 yards and the four touchdowns to lead Middle Tennessee to its eighth win – tied for the most wins since the 2001 campaign.

The Blue Raiders also secured their fifth win at Floyd Stadium, representing the most home wins since Middle Tennessee was 5-0 at home in 2001. The fans enjoyed this one from the outset as the Blue Raiders (8-3) stormed to a 17–0 lead in the first quarter and never relented...

It wasn't all offense. Middle Tennessee's unrelenting defense continued to dominate and got into the scoring act as well. The defense yielded just 220 yards and scored when Jamari Lattimore picked up a fumble and lateraled it to Jeremy Kellem who scored to give the Blue Raiders a commanding lead. Marcus Udell also collected his seventh interception of the season to key a stop squad that was never really threatened.

Middle Tennessee, hopeful of a second bowl in Head Coach Rick Stockstill's fourth season, will conclude the regular season seeking nine wins at Louisiana-Monroe next Saturday.

=== Louisiana–Monroe ===
	1	2	3	4	Total
Blue Raiders	7	14	7	10	38
Warhawks	7	3	3	6	19

Middle Tennessee put the finishing touches on the most successful gridiron season of the FBS era with a convincing 38-19 win against Louisiana-Monroe at Malone Stadium Saturday.

The Blue Raiders (9-3, 7-1) notched their ninth win by putting an exclamation mark on a persuasive season that now includes: most single-season wins (9) of the FBS era, most SBC wins (7) in a single season, one of two SBC schools to win nine games in a season (North Texas, 2003) and a current six-game win streak. The nine wins for Middle Tennessee is the most in a season since 1992.

They will now await a postseason bowl invitation, which they believe is sure to come. It would be the program's second bowl appearance in four seasons under head coach Rick Stockstill.

Dasher ran for two touchdowns and threw for two more to lead the offensive charge that included 306 yards total offense. Dasher's two touchdowns enabled him to tie Mickey Corwins's single-season mark of 21 touchdowns, set in 1984. He also became Middle Tennessee's career leader for rushing yards by a quarterback with 88 against ULM, giving him 1,676 career rushing yards to break Marvin Collier's mark of 1,652 set from 1985 to 1988. Dasher was 10-of-18 through the air for 116 yards. He did throw two interceptions.

Defense also was a staple as it dominated the Warhawks after allowing a touchdown on their opening possession. The dandy defensive effort included three interceptions, one for a touchdown, four sacks and 11 tackles for loss. Chris McCoy continued his stellar campaign with ferocious play that included three tackles for loss. Alex Suber was a defensive wizard with eight tackles, including one for loss, an interception and a pass break-up, and linebacker Danny Carmichael continued to make plays from one side of the field to the other, collecting 10 tackles including one for loss. Suber, Jeremy Kellem and Kevin Brown had the interceptions.

=== Southern Mississippi–New Orleans Bowl ===
	1	2	3	4	Total
Golden Eagles	14	3	3	12	32
Blue Raiders	0	14	14	14	42

Middle Tennessee and its throng of fans enjoyed an early Blue Christmas in the Big Easy when it powered past Southern Miss, 42-32, in the R&L Carriers New Orleans Bowl at the Louisiana Superdome Sunday night.

The Blue Raiders capped one of the best seasons in school history with their first bowl win during the FBS era as the Sun Belt's representative in the New Orleans Bowl, where Conference USA representative Southern Miss had never lost in three previous tries before getting throttled by a spirited Middle Tennessee team. It was the second bowl appearance for Middle Tennessee as a FBS member and its first in the New Orleans Bowl.

Middle Tennessee (10-3) ended the season with a seven-game win streak. It's the most wins for the Blue Raiders since the 1992 squad won 10 and the win streak is the longest since the 1985 team won 11 straight. Astonishing junior quarterback Dwight Dasher was named the New Orleans Bowl Most Valuable Player after accounting for 363 yards total offense – 201 rushing and 162 passing – rushing for two touchdowns and passing for two more.

For good measure Dasher also became one of just eight quarterbacks in FBS history to rush for 1,000 yards and pass for 2,000 in the same season. His 201 yards rushing established a New Orleans Bowl record and he became the only quarterback in Blue Raider history to surpass 1,000 yards rushing in a season.

While the spotlight would shine on Dasher it was still that blue-collar, blue-clad defense that stiffened after a slow start and dominated the game following the opening quarter when it surrendered two touchdowns on Southern Miss' first two drives. It allowed just 18 points the remainder of the game, while the Blue Raider offense piled up 42 points.

The defense also had two interceptions compliments of Alex Suber and Danny Carmichael. Making the turnovers even more impressive was the fact Southern Miss quarterback Martevious Young had thrown just two interceptions all season and had 165 consecutive completions without a pick before Suber turned him over in the second quarter. Suber's interception would set up a touchdown that enabled Middle Tennessee to rally and tie the game, 14-14.

Carmichael's interception sealed the game for the Blue Raiders.

The win demonstrated the continued growth of Middle Tennessee's program under fourth-year head coach Rick Stockstill, who has led the Blue Raiders to both of their bowl appearances of the FBS era. He had to like the way his team performed before a national-television audience on one of its biggest stages.

== Coaching staff ==
- Head hoach: Rick Stockstill
- Assistant head coach, defensive Line: Les Herrin
- Offensive coordinator, quarterbacks: Tony Franklin
- Offensive line: Jimmy Ray Stephens
- Wide receivers: Justin Watts
- Inside receivers: Brent Brock
- Defensive coordinator, linebackers: Manny Diaz
- Running backs: Willie Simmons
- Safeties: David Bibee
- Cornerbacks: Steve Ellis
- Strength: Russell Patterson

== Depth chart ==
Defense

FS
33 Kevin Brown (Jr.)
31 Denzell Guerra (r-Fr.)

WLB	MLB	SLB
⋅	44 Danny Carmichael (Sr.)	⋅
43 Gorby Loreus (So.)	56 Norman Washington (r-So.)	⋅

SS
20 Jeremy Kellem (Jr.)
24 Derrick Crumpton (So.)

CB
7 Alex Suber (r-Sr.)
25 Jawan Carson (So.)

DE	DT	DT	DE
11 Jamari Lattimore (Jr.)	92 Brandon Perry (r-Sr.)	47 Dwight Smith (Jr.)	98 Chris McCoy (r-Sr.)
93 Phillip Tinsley (r-Fr.)	51 SaCoby Carter (r-So.)	94 Gary Tucker (r-Jr.	91 Emmanuel Perez (Jr.)

CB
6 Rod Issac (Jr.)
3 Marcus Udell (Sr.)

Offense

WR
15 Sancho McDonald (So.)
1 Chris McClover Sr.

WR
17 Patrick Honeycutt (r-Sr.)
2 Desmond Gee (Sr.)

LT	LG	C	RG	RT
78 Mike Williams (r-So.)	70 Jamal Lewis (r-Jr.)	72 Mark Thompson (r-Sr.)	65 Alex Stuart (So.)	74 Mark Fisher (Jr.)
71 Jake Padrick (r-So.)	60 Brandon McLeroy (So.	75 Chris Hawkins (r-Jr.	62 Evon Lettsome (r-Jr.)	50 Colin Boss (r-So.)

WR
27 Tavarres Jefferson (Fr.)
81 Wes Caldwell Jr.

WR
4 Malcolm Beyah (So.)
80 Garrett Andrews (Jr.)

QB
9 Dwight Dasher (Jr.)
10 Brent Burnette (r-Fr.)

Key reserves
RB 26 Benjamin Cunningham (Fr.)
S 24 Derrick Crumpton (So.)
S 42 Juno Prudhomm (Fr.)
LB 43 Gorby Loreus (So.)

RB
21 Phillip Tanner (Sr.)
23 D.D. Kyles (r-So.)

Special teams
PK 38 Alan Gendreau (So.)
P 37 David DeFatta (r-Sr.)
KR 2 Desmond Gee (Sr.)
PR 17 Patrick Honeycutt (r-Sr.)
H 48 Adam Wade (r-Jr.)

== After the season ==
=== NFL draft ===
The following Blue Raider was selected in the 2010 NFL draft following the season.

Round	Pick	Player	Position	NFL club
7	212	Chris McCoy	Linebacker	Miami Dolphins
