= 2010 GMAC Bowl =

Central Michigan Chippewas	Troy Trojans
(11–2)	(9–3)
MAC	Sun Belt
44	41
Head coach: Steve Stripling (interim)	Head coach: Larry Blakeney
AP / Coaches / BCS; 25 / NR / NR
	1	2	3	4	OT	2OT	Total
Central Michigan	3	6	10	15	7	3	44
Troy	7	3	14	10	7	0	41
- Date: January 6, 2010
- Season: 2009
- Stadium: Ladd–Peebles Stadium
- Location: Mobile, Alabama
- MVP: QB Dan LeFevour (CMU)
- Referee: David Epperley (C-USA)
- Attendance: 34,486
- Payout: US$750,000

United States TV coverage
- Network: ESPN
- Announcers: Joe Tessitore; Rod Gilmore

The 2010 GMAC Bowl, the eleventh edition of the college football bowl game, was played at Ladd–Peebles Stadium in Mobile, Alabama, on January 6, 2010, as one of the final games of the 2009 NCAA Division I FBS football season. The game was telecast on ESPN and matched the Central Michigan Chippewas, champions of the Mid-American Conference, against the Troy Trojans, champions of the Sun Belt Conference. Central Michigan won in double overtime, 44-41, on a 37-yard field goal by Andrew Aguila, his fifth of the game.

The opponent for the MAC team was scheduled to be the ninth selection of a team from the Atlantic Coast Conference. However, the ACC produced only seven bowl-eligible teams in 2009. Therefore, the GMAC Bowl was able to select an at-large team that was bowl eligible and did not have a prior conference tie-in. Many had felt that the invitation would go to Notre Dame, who finished the season at 6-6. After lengthy meetings the Notre Dame administration made the decision that they will not go to a bowl game following the 2009 season. Also, Notre Dame would only have been eligible to fill the slot after all available teams with 7 or more wins had been accommodated. Several sportswriters pointed to the comparatively low payout of the bowl and the potential humiliation if Central Michigan (then the likely opponent) defeated the Irish.

Troy ultimately filled the slot after Southern Miss claimed Conference USA's slot in the 2009 New Orleans Bowl. Although that game has a guaranteed berth for the Sun Belt champion, the organizers used their prerogative to invite the conference's second-place team, Middle Tennessee, not wishing to repeat its Troy–Southern Miss matchup from 2008. As a 9-win team, Troy had priority over any 6–6 teams not already tied to specific bowl games.

== Game facts ==
- This was the first-ever football game between the two teams.
- Neither team had appeared in the GMAC Bowl prior to this matchup.
- The game was the only non-BCS game to match two conference champions.
- MAC representatives are 6-3 in the game. CMU's victory broke a 14-game bowl losing streak for the conference.

== Game summary ==
=== Scoring summary ===
Scoring Play	Account
1st Quarter
Troy — DuJuan Harris 9-yard pass from Levi Brown (Michael Taylor kick), 3:52	Troy 7–0
CMU — Andrew Aguila 28-yard field goal, 0:10	Troy 7–3
2nd Quarter
CMU — Andrew Aguila 35-yard field goal, 8:45	Troy 7–6
Troy — Michael Taylor 22-yard field goal, 3:59	Troy 10–6
CMU — Andrew Aguila 44-yard field goal, 1:28	Troy 10–9
3rd Quarter
Troy — Shawn Southwards 1-yard run (Michael Taylor kick), 13:10	Troy 17–9
CMU — Andrew Aguila 42-yard field goal, 9:47	Troy 17–12
CMU — Antonio Brown 7-yard run (Andrew Aguila kick), 2:46	CMU 19–17
Troy — DuJuan Harris 6-yard run (Michael Taylor kick), 0:23	Troy 24–19
4th Quarter
Troy — DuJuan Harris 1-yard run (Michael Taylor kick), 8:01	Troy 31–19
CMU — Antonio Brown 95-yard kickoff return (Andrew Aguila kick), 7:47	Troy 31–26
CMU — Bryan Anderson 4-yard pass from Dan LeFevour (Kito Poblah pass from Dan LeFevour 2 period attempt good), 1:17	CMU 34–31
Troy — Michael Taylor 46-yard field goal, 0:31	TIE 34–34
Overtime
CMU — Dan LeFevour 13-yard run (Andrew Aguila kick)	CMU 41–34
Troy — Shawn Southward 1-yard run (Michael Taylor kick)	TIE 41–41
2nd Overtime
CMU — Andrew Aguila 37-yard field goal	CMU 44–41
