= Chris McCoy =

American gridiron football player (born 1986)

No. 96
- Position: Defensive end

Personal information
- Born: November 25, 1986 (age 39); Villa Rica, Georgia, U.S.
- Listed height: 6 ft 4 in (1.93 m)
- Listed weight: 261 lb (118 kg)

Career information
- College: Middle Tennessee
- NFL draft: 2010: 7th round, 212th overall pick

Career history
- Miami Dolphins (2010)*; Seattle Seahawks (2010)*; Miami Dolphins (2010)*; Houston Texans (2010)*; Pittsburgh Steelers (2011)*; Calgary Stampeders (2011–2012); Philadelphia Eagles (2013)*; Jacksonville Jaguars (2013)*; Oakland Raiders (2013–2014)*; Ottawa Redblacks (2014)
- * Offseason or practice squad member only

Awards and highlights
- Sun Belt Co-Defensive Player of the Year (2009); First-team All-Sun Belt (2009)
- Stats at Pro Football Reference
- Stats at CFL.ca (archive)

Christopher Brandon McCoy (born November 25, 1986) is an American former professional football defensive end. He was selected by the Miami Dolphins in the seventh round of the 2010 NFL draft. He played college football at Middle Tennessee State. McCoy also played in the National Football League (NFL) for the Seattle Seahawks, Houston Texans, Pittsburgh Steelers, Philadelphia Eagles, and the Calgary Stampeders of the Canadian Football League (CFL).

== Professional career ==
=== Miami Dolphins ===
McCoy was selected by the Miami Dolphins with the 212th overall pick of the 2010 NFL draft. On June 15, 2010, McCoy was signed to a four-year contract. He was waived during final cuts on September 4, but was re-signed to the team's practice squad. He was later released from the practice squad.

=== Seattle Seahawks ===
McCoy was signed to the Seattle Seahawks' practice squad on October 19, 2010. He was released on October 26, 2010.

=== Pittsburgh Steelers ===
McCoy played in all pre-season games of 2011 for the Pittsburgh Steelers but was cut from the final roster before the start of 2011 NFL season.

=== Calgary Stampeders ===
After being cut from the Steelers, McCoy signed with the Canadian Football League's Calgary Stampeders. McCoy played for the Stampeders as a defensive end and recorded 12 games with 29 tackles and five sacks over two seasons in the CFL.

=== Philadelphia Eagles ===
McCoy was signed by the Philadelphia Eagles on February 6, 2013 and was cut on August 31, 2013.

=== Jacksonville Jaguars ===
McCoy was claimed off waivers by the Jacksonville Jaguars on September 1, 2013 and released on September 14, 2013. He did not appear in any games.

He was signed to the team's practice squad on September 16, and later released on October 1.
