= Ladarius Green =

American football player (born 1990)

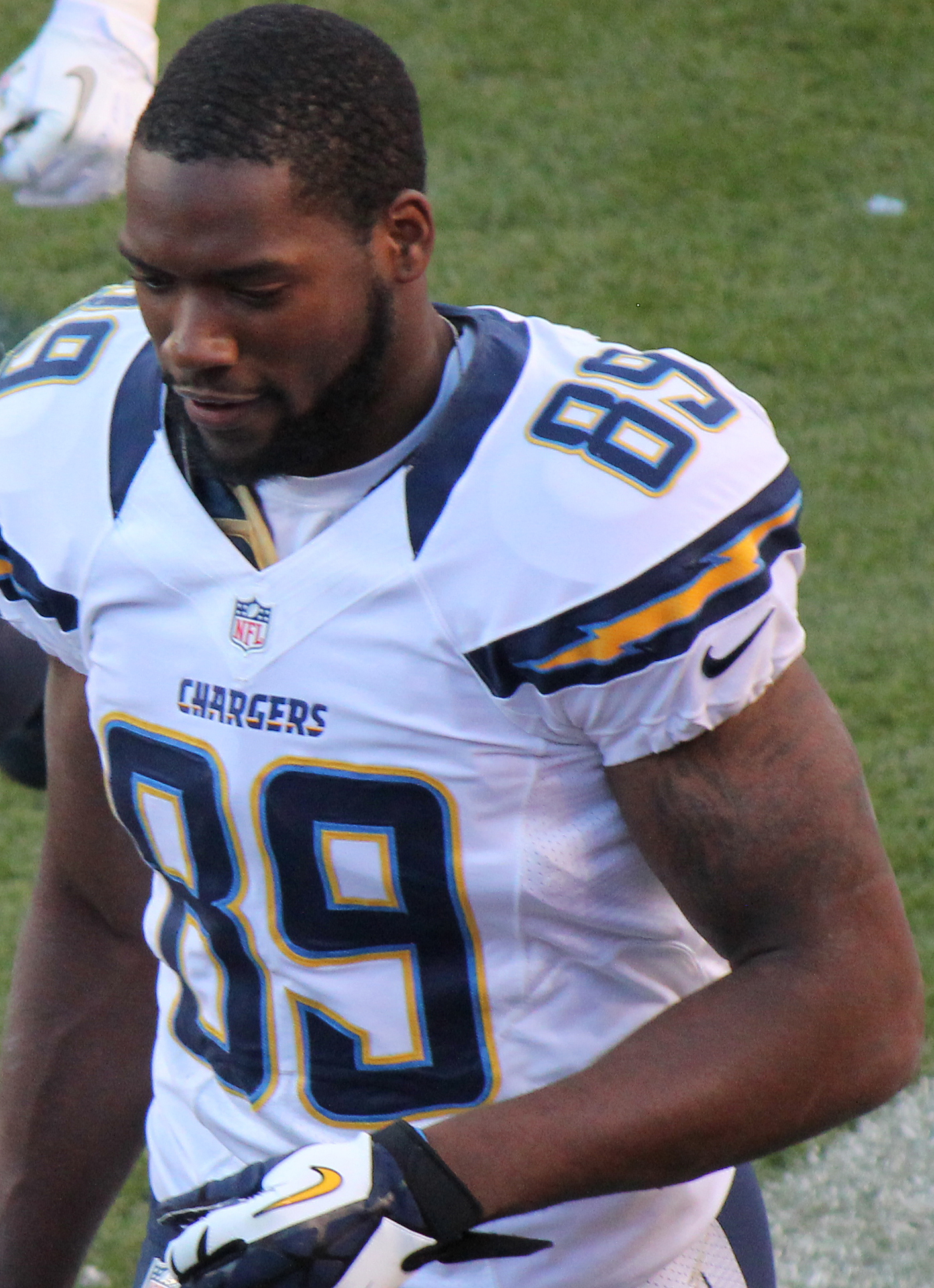
- Green with the San Diego Chargers in 2012

No. 89
- Position: Tight end

Personal information
- Born: May 29, 1990 (age 36); West Berlin, Germany
- Listed height: 6 ft 6 in (1.98 m)
- Listed weight: 240 lb (109 kg)

Career information
- High school: Booker T. Washington (Pensacola, Florida)
- College: Louisiana–Lafayette (2008–2011)
- NFL draft: 2012: 4th round, 110th overall pick

Career history
- San Diego Chargers (2012–2015); Pittsburgh Steelers (2016)

Awards and highlights
- First-team All-Sun Belt (2010); Second-team All-Sun Belt (2009)

Career NFL statistics
- Receptions: 95
- Receiving yards: 1,391
- Receiving touchdowns: 8
- Stats at Pro Football Reference

Ladarius Green (born May 29, 1990) is an American former professional football player who was a tight end in the National Football League (NFL). He played college football for the Louisiana Ragin' Cajuns and was selected by the San Diego Chargers in the fourth round of the 2012 NFL draft.

== Early life ==
Green was born in Berlin, Germany, where his parents served in the military. He moved to Florida when he was three years old. He attended Booker T. Washington High School in Pensacola, Florida, where he played football and ran track.

== College career ==
Green attended the University of Louisiana at Lafayette from 2008 to 2011. He finished his career with 149 receptions for 2,201 yards and 22 touchdowns.

== Professional career ==
=== Pre-draft ===
From his junior to senior season, Green went from a virtually unknown prospect to a late riser after two solid seasons. Coming out of Louisiana-Lafayette, Green was initially projected to be a late round draft choice. Mel Kiper named him to his list of Top 5 tight ends in the 2012 NFL Draft. Green received mainly positive reviews for his quick footwork, ability to use his frame for boxing out and catching, athleticism, body control, and large catch radius. Scouts also thought that he was a raw talent that would have to be a project for whoever drafted him. He was invited to the NFL scouting combine and completed all the workouts and positional drills. Green's draft stock increased after an impressive combine performance. After the combine he was projected to be drafted in the third or fourth round by the majority of analysts and was rated as the third best tight end out of the 73 available by NFLDraftScout.com. He began receiving comparisons to the top two tight ends in the draft, Coby Fleener and Dwayne Allen.

Pre-draft measurables
| Height | Weight | Arm length | Hand span | 40-yard dash | 10-yard split | 20-yard split | 20-yard shuttle | Three-cone drill | Vertical jump | Broad jump | Bench press |
|---|---|---|---|---|---|---|---|---|---|---|---|
| 6 ft 5 3/4 in (1.97 m) | 238 lb (108 kg) | 34 1/2 in (0.88 m) | 10 1/8 in (0.26 m) | 4.56 s | 1.62 s | 2.65 s | 4.47 s | 7.12 s | 35.5 in (0.90 m) | 10 ft 6 in (3.20 m) | 17 reps |
All values from NFL Combine/Pro Day

=== San Diego Chargers ===
==== 2012 ====
Green was selected in fourth round (110th overall) of the 2012 NFL draft by the San Diego Chargers. On May 12, 2012, the San Diego Chargers signed Green to a four-year, $2.55 million rookie contract that also included a signing bonus of $450,900.

He entered training camp competing for the backup tight end position behind Pro-bowler Antonio Gates. He ultimately entered the regular season as the fourth tight end on the Chargers' depth chart, behind veterans Randy McMichael and Dante Rosario. On September 16, 2012, he made his professional regular-season debut against the Tennessee Titans and caught his first career pass on a 31-yard reception from Philip Rivers. During Week 11, he caught a season-high three passes for 25 receiving yards in a 23–30 loss to the Denver Broncos. The following week, he was credited with his first career start against the Baltimore Ravens but finished the loss without logging a statistic. He finished his rookie season with a total of four catches for 56 receiving yards, while appearing in four games and starting one.

==== 2013 ====
To begin his second season, Green was named the third tight end on the depth chart behind longtime veteran Antonio Gates and newly acquired free agent veteran John Phillips. Green began to prove himself as a reliable pass-catching option behind Gates and was able to produce as the third tight end, as the Chargers ran many multiple tight end sets and John Phillips was primarily used as a blocking tight end. On September 22, 2016, Green started the week 3 matchup against the Tennessee Titans and caught his first two passes of the season for 48-yards during the Charger's 17–20 loss. On November 17, 2013, Green caught a season-high four passes for a season-high 81 receiving yards in a 16–20 loss to the Miami Dolphins. The following week, he caught his first career touchdown on a 60-yard touchdown pass from Philip Rivers against the Kansas City Chiefs. He finished the victory with three receptions for 80 receiving yards and a touchdown.

In his first season under new head coach Mike McCoy, Green played all 16 games, while starting 10, collecting 17 receptions for 376 yards along with 3 touchdowns. In a wild card matchup between the Chargers and the Bengals, Green made a leaping catch over the safety Chris Crocker, for the Chargers only passing touchdown of the game. He finished the victory with three catches for 34 receiving yards and a touchdown. The Chargers were eliminated from the playoffs the following week by the Denver Broncos in the divisional championship.

==== 2014 ====
Green began his third season as the backup tight end behind Antonio Gates. Although he was named the backup ahead of John Phillips, Green's role with the Chargers changed under new offensive coordinator Frank Reich, requiring him to block the majority of the time as Gates was the primary pass catching tight end. In the Charger's season opening loss to the Arizona Cardinals, Green caught two passes for 24-yards. He earned his first start of the season the following game against the Seattle Seahawks but finished the loss without a catch. During Week 3, Green caught a season-high four passes for 68 receiving yards during a 28–10 victory at the Buffalo Bills. Green ended the season with 19 receptions on 23 targets for 226 yards and averaged 11.6 yards per catch while also starting four games and appearing in 14.

==== 2015 ====
With starting tight end Antonio Gates suspended for four games, Green was temporarily assigned the starting role to begin the season in 2015. During the season opener against the Detroit Lions, Green caught five passes for 74 receiving yards and a touchdown. On October 4, 2015, he caught four passes for 53-yards and caught a 19-yard touchdown reception during a victory over the Cleveland Browns. He finished the season with a career-high 37 receptions, 429 yards receiving, and four touchdowns. Green's 226 yards after the catch ranked No. 16 among NFL tight ends in 2015. In his last season with the Chargers he started 11 games and appeared in 14.

=== Pittsburgh Steelers ===
On March 10, 2016, the Pittsburgh Steelers signed Green to a four-year, $20 million contract that also includes a signing bonus of $4.75 million. The Steelers signed him to help with a depleted tight end corps after longtime veteran Heath Miller retired during the off-season and Matt Spaeth suffered injuries which would eventually result in his failing of the team physical and release. He suffered an ankle injury during the offseason and started the season on the PUP list. He was activated to the active roster on November 12, 2016.

The following day, Green made his highly anticipated regular season debut and finished the loss to the Dallas Cowboys with three catches for thirty yards. On December 4, 2016, Green caught six passes for a career-high 110 receiving yards and scored his first touchdown of the season on a 20-yard pass from Ben Roethlisberger in the Steelers' 24–14 victory over the New York Giants. The following week, Green earned his first start with the Steelers and caught two passes for 24 receiving yards in a 27–20 victory over the Buffalo Bills.

He started again the following week against the Cincinnati Bengals, catching 5 passes for 72 yards. This performance included a 28-yard third-down catch with under 4 minutes to go in the game, which moved the Steelers into Bengals' territory and allowed Pittsburgh to preserve its 4-point lead on the way to a fifth-straight victory. However, this would ultimately be Green's final play for the Steelers during the 2016 season, as during the conclusion of his catch-and-run, upon being tackled, his head hit off the turf, leading him to be helped off the field. He was ultimately diagnosed with a concussion, missing the Steelers' final two regular season games, as well as all three playoff games.

Green was released by the Steelers on May 18, 2017, with a failed physical designation.

== Personal life ==
He is first cousins with offensive guard Tyronne Green, who he played with in San Diego during Ladarius's rookie season.
