= 2009 Louisiana–Monroe Warhawks football team =

American college football season

2009 Louisiana–Monroe Warhawks football
- Conference: Sun Belt Conference
- Record: 6–6 (5–3 Sun Belt)
- Head coach: Charlie Weatherbie (7th season)
- Co-offensive coordinators: Jonas Weatherbie (1st season); Vance Vice (1st season)
- Defensive coordinator: Troy Reffett (1st season)
- Home stadium: Malone Stadium

2009 Sun Belt Conference football standings
	Conf.			Overall
Team	W		L	W		L
Troy $	8	–	0	9	–	4
Middle Tennessee	7	–	1	10	–	3
Louisiana–Monroe	5	–	3	6	–	6
Florida Atlantic	5	–	3	5	–	7
Louisiana–Lafayette	4	–	4	6	–	6
Arkansas State	3	–	5	4	–	8
FIU	3	–	5	3	–	9
North Texas	1	–	7	2	–	10
Western Kentucky	0	–	8	0	–	12
$ – Conference champion

The 2009 Louisiana–Monroe Warhawks football team represented University of Louisiana at Monroe as a member of the Sun Belt Conference during the 2009 NCAA Division I FBS football season. Led by Charlie Weatherbie in his seventh and final season as head coach, the Warhawks compiled an overall record of 6–6 with a mark of 5–3 in conference play, tying for third place in the Sun Belt. Louisiana–Monroe was bowl eligible, but was not invited to a bowl game. The team played home games at Malone Stadium in Monroe, Louisiana.

Weatherbie was fired at the end of the season. He compiled an overall record of 31–51 in seven seasons as head coach for the Warhawks.

== Schedule ==
Date	Time	Opponent	Site	TV	Result	Attendance	Source
September 5	6:00 pm	at No. 2 Texas*	Darrell K Royal–Texas Memorial Stadium; Austin, TX	FSN	L 20–59	101,096	
September 12	6:00 pm	Texas Southern*	Malone Stadium; Monroe, LA		W 58–0	9,330	
September 19	9:00 pm	at Arizona State*	Sun Devil Stadium; Tempe, AZ		L 14–38	43,780	
September 26	3:00 pm	at Florida Atlantic	Lockhart Stadium; Fort Lauderdale, FL		W 27–25	14,429	
October 3	2:30 pm	FIU^{†}	Malone Stadium; Monroe, LA	Sun Belt Network	W 48–35	17,610	
October 13	7:00 pm	Arkansas State	Malone Stadium; Monroe, LA	ESPN2	W 16–10	14,378	
October 24	6:00 pm	at Kentucky*	Commonwealth Stadium; Lexington, KY		L 13–36	68,203	
October 31	6:00 pm	at Troy	Movie Gallery Stadium; Troy, AL		L 21–42	17,106	
November 7	3:00 pm	at North Texas	Fouts Field; Denton, TX		W 33–6	12,167	
November 14	3:00 pm	Western Kentucky	Malone Stadium; Monroe, LA		W 21–18	16,229	
November 21	6:00 pm	at Louisiana–Lafayette	Cajun Field; Lafayette, LA (Battle on the Bayou)		L 17–21	8,689	
November 28	3:30 pm	Middle Tennessee	Malone Stadium; Monroe, LA		L 19–38	11,896	
*Non-conference game; ^{†}Homecoming; Rankings from AP Poll released prior to the game; All times are in Central time
