= Chris Brooks (wide receiver) =

American football player (born 1987)

No. 83
- Position: Wide receiver

Personal information
- Born: February 5, 1987 (age 39); St. Louis, Missouri, U.S.
- Listed height: 6 ft 2 in (1.88 m)
- Listed weight: 210 lb (95 kg)

Career information
- College: Nebraska
- NFL draft: 2010: undrafted

Career history
- Tampa Bay Buccaneers (2010)*; Indianapolis Colts (2010–2011)
- * Offseason or practice squad member only

Career NFL statistics
- Games played: 1
- Stats at Pro Football Reference

Chris Brooks (born February 5, 1987) is an American former professional football player who was a wide receiver in the National Football League (NFL). He was signed by the Tampa Bay Buccaneers as an undrafted free agent in 2010. He played college football for the Nebraska Cornhuskers.

Brooks also played for the Indianapolis Colts.

== Professional career ==
Pre-draft measurables
Height	Weight	40-yard dash	10-yard split	20-yard split	20-yard shuttle	Three-cone drill	Vertical jump	Broad jump	Bench press
6 ft 1 3/4 in (1.87 m)	215 lb (98 kg)	4.47 s	1.60 s	2.62 s	4.28 s	7.22 s	33.0 in (0.84 m)	9 ft 6 in (2.90 m)	14 reps
All values from Pro Day

=== Tampa Bay Buccaneers ===
After going undrafted in the 2010 NFL draft, Brooks signed with the Tampa Bay Buccaneers as an undrafted free agent on May 3, 2010. He was cut on August 26, 2010.

=== Indianapolis Colts ===
Brooks was signed to the Indianapolis Colts practice squad on September 29, 2010. He was promoted to the active roster and played on November 14, 2010. He was cut three days later on November 17, 2010 and re-signed to the practice squad. He was signed to a future contract on January 11, 2011. Brooks was waived during final cuts on September 3, 2011, and re-signed to the Colts' practice squad the following day. He was released on September 13.
