= Alan Gendreau =

American football player (born 1989)

No. 38
- Position: Kicker

Personal information
- Born: May 27, 1989 (age 37); Winter Park, Florida
- Listed height: 5 ft 10 in (1.78 m)
- Listed weight: 182 lb (83 kg)

Career information
- High school: Orangewood Christian (Maitland, Florida)
- College: Middle Tennessee (2008–2011)

Awards and highlights
- 2× All-Sun Belt first team (2009–2010); Sun Belt All-Freshman team (2008)
- Stats at ESPN

Alan Scott Gendreau (born May 27, 1989) is an American former college football player for the Middle Tennessee Blue Raiders. The placekicker was openly gay to his teammates. He ended his college career as the leading scorer in Sun Belt Conference history.

Gendreau went to high school in Florida, where he was an all-state football player as well as an accomplished soccer player. He came out as gay at age 16. He attended college at Middle Tennessee State University, where he chose to play football over soccer. He began his career being named to the Sun Belt All-Freshman team, and was later named twice to the All-Sun Belt first team. He also made the second longest field goal in Sun Belt Conference history and set multiple school placekicking records.

== Early life ==
Gendreau grew up in Apopka, Florida in a deeply religious home. A devout Christian, Gendreau has been openly gay since high school when he came out to his parents at the age of 16. Afterwards, they placed him in church-based counseling that spanned four sessions.

He attended Orangewood Christian High School in Maitland, Florida, where he was a placekicker and a first-team all-state selection as a junior and senior. After making 14-of-16 field goals and 27-of-30 extra points in his senior year, he was selected to play in the Central Florida All-Star game. He ended his career as the school's all-time leading scorer. He also played soccer at Orangewood, twice earning Orlando Sentinel Player of the Year for soccer and setting the all area scoring record with 172 career goals.

== College career ==
Gendreau attended Middle Tennessee State University. He made the difficult decision to play football over soccer, and played for the Middle Tennessee Blue Raiders for four years. The team represents the university in the Sun Belt Conference in the National Collegiate Athletic Association (NCAA) Division I Football Bowl Subdivision (FBS). While his teammates, coaches, classmates, and friends knew of his sexual orientation, they made no mention of it to the media. Otherwise, he could have been the first publicly out gay player in NCAA Division I college football. (Note: Brian Sims came out to his team in 2000 while playing NCAA Division II football for Bloomsburg, and publicly told his story in 2009.)

=== 2008 season ===
In 2008, Gendreau began his college career with Middle Tennessee, who was led by head coach Rick Stockstill. Gendreau came out to his peers in his freshman year. That year, he had a boyfriend, whom he met on Facebook, who had played baseball in college. Gendreau was not the object of homophobia from his teammates, and his sexual orientation did not cause any issues. One teammate offered to protect Gendreau from any potential gay-bashing.

He hit four field goals in their 24–14 winning game against Maryland on September 6, 2008. On October 1 in a nationally televised home game on ESPN2, the team rallied to score a game-tying touchdown against Florida Atlantic as time expired. Florida Atlantic called two consecutive timeouts in an attempt to disrupt Gendreau's concentration, but he made the game-winning extra point for a 14–13 Blue Raiders, and the fans subsequently stormed the field. During the season, he made a then-school record eight consecutive field goals. The streak ended on a failed 46-yard attempt into the wind in the season finale at Louisiana. He was named to the Sun Belt All-Freshman team by both The Daily News Journal and Rivals.com.

=== 2009 season ===
Against the Maryland Terrapins in 2009, Gendreau made a 19-yard field goal as time expired, quieting the Maryland home crowd of 43,167 at Byrd Stadium in College Park, Maryland. They defeated Maryland for the second second-straight season, winning 32–31 in an exciting game that went back and forth. It was Middle Tennessee's first road victory over a BCS-conference opponent since 2005. Gendreau's winning kick earned him the nickname, "Ice". In a 37–21 win over North Texas, he scored 13 points including field goals from 20, 31, and 48 yards.

Gendreau finished the season with school records for most field goals made (18), total points (104), and consecutive field goals made (12). He was named to the All-Sun Belt first team by the league's coaches and media, as well as in separate all-conference teams by Phil Steele and Rivals.com. He was also one of 20 semifinalists for the Lou Groza Award, presented to the top kicker in college football.

=== 2010 season ===
In his junior year in 2010, Gendreau converted a 55-yard field goal in their winning game against Louisiana–Lafayette. The kick was the second longest in both conference and school history. Gendreau was named Sunbelt Conference's Special Teams Player of the Week, the second time he had earned the honor. He was again named to the league's All-Sun Belt first team.

=== 2011 season ===
In his senior year in 2011, Gendreau again played in every game that season. However, he had a tough opening game against Purdue. He had two of his three field goal attempts blocked, including the game-tying 47-yard attempt at the end that could have sent the 27–24 game into overtime. His holder Josh Davis said the blocks "weren't [Gendreau's] fault. It was a total breakdown in protection." Overall, Gendreau missed four out of five field goals to start the season. Despite his strong second half, interest from the NFL waned. He finished his college career with 295 points, the most in Sun Belt Conference history.

== Post-college career ==
Scouting reports leading up to the 2012 NFL draft rated Gendreau as an average kicker. With only 62 field goal attempts in college—just over one per game—he did not receive attention from many NFL teams. He also did not have an agent and he did not know how to obtain one. He went undrafted. Gendreau stayed in shape through 2013, hoping to become the first openly gay NFL football player. Outsports, a Web site specializing in gays and sports, released his story about being a gay football player on April 23, 2013. "I'm a kicker that happens to be gay," Gendreau said. "It's a part of who I am, and not everything I am. I just want to be known as a normal kicker."

"It's totally legit that he can get into the [NFL]," said Chris Kluwe, punter for the Minnesota Vikings. Kluwe believed that place-kicking, which is limited to one specific skill set, allowed proficient kickers to be successful even if they had taken a break from the game for years.

As of 2015, Gendreau is a flight attendant working for American Airlines.

He also has a YouTube channel created in 2012, with about 2,000 followers and a total viewership of about 140,000. The channel features his own renditions and covers of several famous songs, including Home by Michael Bublé.

== See also ==
- Homosexuality in American football
- List of lesbian, gay, bisexual, and transgender sportspeople
