= 2009 Troy Trojans football team =

American college football season

2009 Troy Trojans football

Sun Belt champion

GMAC Bowl, L 41–44 ^{2OT} vs. Central Michigan
- Conference: Sun Belt Conference
- Record: 9–4 (8–0 Sun Belt)
- Head coach: Larry Blakeney (19th season)
- Offensive coordinator: Neal Brown (2nd season)
- Offensive scheme: Air Raid
- Defensive coordinator: Jeremy Rowell (4th season)
- Base defense: 4–2–5
- Home stadium: Movie Gallery Stadium

2009 Sun Belt Conference football standings
	Conf.			Overall
Team	W		L	W		L
Troy $	8	–	0	9	–	4
Middle Tennessee	7	–	1	10	–	3
Louisiana–Monroe	5	–	3	6	–	6
Florida Atlantic	5	–	3	5	–	7
Louisiana–Lafayette	4	–	4	6	–	6
Arkansas State	3	–	5	4	–	8
FIU	3	–	5	3	–	9
North Texas	1	–	7	2	–	10
Western Kentucky	0	–	8	0	–	12
$ – Conference champion

The 2009 Troy Trojans football team represented Troy University in the 2009 NCAA Division I FBS football season. They played their home games at Movie Gallery Stadium in Troy, Alabama and competed in the Sun Belt Conference. The Trojans won their fourth straight Sun Belt championship going undefeated in conference play (8–0) with a regular season record of 9–3. They were invited to the GMAC Bowl, where they played Mid-American Conference champion Central Michigan and were defeated, 44–41, in two overtimes.

== Schedule ==
Date	Time	Opponent	Site	TV	Result	Attendance	Source
September 3	6:00 pm	at Bowling Green*	Doyt Perry Stadium; Bowling Green, OH		L 14–31	14,514	
September 12	11:21 am	at No. 1 Florida*	Ben Hill Griffin Stadium; Gainesville, FL	SEC Network	L 6–56	90,349	
September 19	2:30 pm	UAB*	Movie Gallery Stadium; Troy, AL		W 27–14	21,182	
September 26	3:30 pm	at Arkansas State	ASU Stadium; Jonesboro, AR	CST	W 30–27	23,641	
October 6	7:00 pm	Middle Tennessee	Movie Gallery Stadium; Troy, AL (Battle for the Palladium)	ESPN2	W 31–7	17,108	
October 17	6:00 pm	at FIU	FIU Stadium; Miami, FL		W 42–33	10,142	
October 24	2:30 pm	North Texas	Movie Gallery Stadium; Troy, AL		W 50–26	20,032	
October 31	6:00 pm	Louisiana–Monroe	Movie Gallery Stadium; Troy, AL		W 42–21	17,106	
November 7	4:00 pm	at Western Kentucky	Houchens Industries–L. T. Smith Stadium; Bowling Green, KY		W 40–20	16,747	
November 14	6:30 pm	at Arkansas*	Donald W. Reynolds Razorback Stadium; Fayetteville, AR	CST/CSS	L 20–56	66,442	
November 21	3:15 pm	Florida Atlantic	Movie Gallery Stadium; Troy, AL		W 47–21	16,638	
November 28	6:00 pm	at Louisiana—Lafayette	Cajun Field; Lafayette, LA		W 48–31	12,245	
January 6	7:00 pm	vs. No. 25 Central Michigan*	Ladd–Peebles Stadium; Mobile, AL (GMAC Bowl)	ESPN	L 41–44 ^{2OT}	34,486	
*Non-conference game; Rankings from AP Poll released prior to the game; All times are in Central time

== Personnel ==
=== Coaching staff ===
- Larry Blakeney – Head Coach
- Neal Brown – Offensive Coordinator/Quarterbacks
- Jeremy Rowell – Defensive Coordinator
- Randy Butler – Defensive Ends/Recruiting Coordinator
- Maurea Crain – Defensive Line
- Kenny Edenfield – Inside Receivers
- Benjy Parker – Linebackers
- John Schlarman – Offensive Line
- Chad Scott – Running Backs
- Richard Shaughnessy – Strength and Conditioning
