= 2007 Sun Belt Conference football season =

- League: NCAA Division I FBS (Football Bowl Subdivision)
- Sport: football
- Duration: August 28, 2007 through January 6, 2008
- Teams: 8
- TV partner: ESPN

2008 NFL Draft
- Top draft pick: Leodis McKelvin
- Picked by: Buffalo Bills, 11th overall

Regular season
- Champion: Troy; Florida Atlantic
- Season MVP: Rusty Smith

Football seasons
- ← 2006 2008 →

2007 Sun Belt Conference football standings
	Conf.			Overall
Team	W		L	W		L
Florida Atlantic +	6	–	1	8	–	5
Troy +	6	–	1	8	–	4
Middle Tennessee	4	–	3	5	–	7
Louisiana–Monroe	4	–	3	6	–	6
Arkansas State	3	–	4	5	–	7
Louisiana–Lafayette	3	–	4	3	–	9
FIU	1	–	6	1	–	11
North Texas	1	–	6	2	–	10
+ – Conference co-champions

The 2007 Sun Belt Conference football season was an NCAA football season that was played from August 28, 2007, to January 6, 2008. The Sun Belt Conference consisted of 8 football members: Arkansas State, Florida Atlantic, Florida International, Louisiana-Lafayette, Louisiana-Monroe, Middle Tennessee, North Texas, and Troy. Troy and FAU split the Sun Belt Championship, with FAU playing in the New Orleans Bowl where they defeated Memphis.

== Players of the Year ==
2007 Sun Belt Player of the Year awards

Award	Player	School
Player of the Year	Rusty Smith	Florida Atlantic
Offensive Player of the Year	Omar Haugabook	Troy
Defensive Player of the Year	Tyrell Johnson	Arkansas State
Newcomer of the Year	Chris Bradwell	Troy
Freshman of the Year	Giovanni Vizza	North Texas
Coach of the Year	Howard Schnellenberger	Florida Atlantic

== All-Conference Teams ==
Coaches All-Conference Selections

Position	Player	Team
First-team Offense
QB	Rusty Smith	Florida Atlantic
RB	Tyrell Fenroy	UL Lafayette
RB	Calvin Dawson	UL Monroe
WR	Cortez Gent	Florida Atlantic
WR	Casey Fitzgerald	North Texas
TE	Jason Harmon	Florida Atlantic
OL	Matt Mandich	Arkansas State
OL	Jesse Newman	UL Lafayette
OL	Franklin Dunbar	Middle Tennessee
OL	Kyle Cunningham	UL Monroe
OL	Dion Small	Troy
First-team Defense
DL	Rodney Hardeway	UL Lafayette
DL	Tavares Jones	Middle Tennessee
DL	Erik Walden	Middle Tennessee
DL	Jeremiah Chapman	North Texas
LB	Frantz Joseph	Florida Atlantic
LB	Cergile Sincere	Florida Atlantic
LB	Boris Lee	Troy
DB	Khayyam Burns	Arkansas State
DB	Tyrell Johnson	Arkansas State
DB	Tavious Polo	Florida Atlantic
DB	Elbert Mack	Troy
First-team Special Teams
K	Greg Whibbs	Troy
P	Scott Love	UL Monroe
RS	Leodis McKelvin	Troy
All-purpose	Desmond Gee	Middle Tennessee

Position	Player	Team
Second-team Offense
QB	Omar Haugabook	Troy
RB	Reggie Arnold	Arkansas State
RB	Kenny Cattouse	Troy
WR	Levi Dejohnette	Arkansas State
WR	Gary Banks	Troy
TE	Zeek Zacharie	UL Monroe
OL	John Rizzo	Florida Atlantic
OL	Jarrid Smith	Florida Atlantic
OL	Adam Hill	UL Monroe
OL	Chris Fisher	UL Lafayette
OL	Kelvin Drake	North Texas
Second-team Defense
DL	Jervonte Jackson	Florida Atlantic
DL	David Cooper	UL Monroe
DL	Kenny Mainor	Troy
DL	Shawn Todd	Troy
LB	Koby McKinnon	Arkansas State
LB	Antwyne Zanders	UL Lafayette
LB	Cardia Jackson	UL Monroe
DB	Corey Small	Florida Atlantic
DB	Greg James	UL Monroe
DB	Bradley Robinson	Middle Tennessee
DB	Leodis McKelvin	Troy
Second-team Special Teams
K	Drew Edmiston	UL Lafayette
P	Brett Shrable	Arkansas State
RS	Lionell Singleton	FIU
All-purpose	Michael Desormeaux	UL Lafayette
