= 2008 Sun Belt Conference football season =

- League: NCAA Division I FBS (Football Bowl Subdivision)
- Sport: football
- Duration: August 28, 2008 through December 26, 2008
- Teams: 8
- TV partner: ESPN

2009 NFL Draft
- Top draft pick: Sherrod Martin
- Picked by: Carolina Panthers, 59th overall

Regular season
- Champion: Troy
- Season MVP: Tyrell Fenroy (RB, ULL)

Football seasons
- ← 2007 2009 →

2008 Sun Belt Conference football standings
	Conf.			Overall
Team	W		L	W		L
Troy $	6	–	1	8	–	5
Louisiana–Lafayette	5	–	2	6	–	6
Florida Atlantic	4	–	3	7	–	6
Arkansas State	4	–	3	6	–	6
FIU	3	–	4	5	–	7
Middle Tennessee	3	–	4	5	–	7
Louisiana–Monroe	3	–	4	4	–	8
North Texas	0	–	7	1	–	11
$ – Conference champion

The 2008 Sun Belt Conference football season was an NCAA football season that was played from August 28, 2008, to December 26, 2008. The Sun Belt Conference consisted of 8 football members: Arkansas State, Florida Atlantic, Florida International, Louisiana-Lafayette, Louisiana-Monroe, Middle Tennessee, North Texas, and Troy. Troy won the Sun Belt Championship but lost the Southern Miss in the New Orleans Bowl. FAU defeated Central Michigan in the Motor City Bowl 24–21.

== Players of the Year ==
2008 Sun Belt Player of the Year awards

Award	Player	School
Player of the Year	Tyrell Fenroy	Louisiana-Lafayette
Offensive Player of the Year	Michael Desormeaux	Louisiana-Lafayette
Defensive Player of the Year	Alex Carrington	Arkansas State
Newcomer of the Year	Levi Brown	Troy
Freshman of the Year	T. Y. Hilton	Florida International
Coach of the Year	Larry Blakeney	Troy

== All-Conference Teams ==
Coaches All-Conference Selections

Position	Player	Team
First-team Offense
QB	Michael Desormeaux	UL Lafayette
RB	Reggie Arnold	Arkansas State
RB	Tyrell Fenroy	UL Lafayette
WR	Casey Fitzgerald	North Texas
WR	Jerrel Jernigan	Troy
TE	Zeek Zacharie	UL Monroe
OL	Matt Mandich	Arkansas State
OL	Brad Bustle	UL Lafayette
OL	Chris Fisher	UL Lafayette
OL	Chris Jamison	Troy
OL	Dion Small	Troy
First-team Defense
DL	Alex Carrington	Arkansas State
DL	Jervonte Jackson	Florida Atlantic
DL	Brandon Lang	Troy
DL	Cameron Sheffield	Troy
LB	Frantz Joseph	Florida Atlantic
LB	Cardia Jackson	UL Monroe
LB	Boris Lee	Troy
DB	Corey Small	Florida Atlantic
DB	Anthony Gaitor	FIU
DB	Terence Moore	Troy
DB	Sherrod Martin	Troy
First-team Special Teams
K	Josh Arauco	Arkansas State
P	Truman Spencer	North Texas
RS	T. Y. Hilton	FIU
All-purpose	T. Y. Hilton	FIU

Position	Player	Team
Second-team Offense
QB	Corey Leonard	Arkansas State
RB	Charles Pierre	Florida Atlantic
RB	DuJuan Harris	Troy
WR	T. Y. Hilton	FIU
WR	Jason Chery	UL Lafayette
TE	David Johnson	Arkansas State
TE	Jamari Grant	Florida Atlantic
OL	Mark Clemons	Arkansas State
OL	Nick Paris	Florida Atlantic
OL	John Rizzo	Florida Atlantic
OL	Brad Serini	FIU
OL	Larry Shappley	UL Monroe
Second-team Defense
DL	Quentin Newman	FIU
DL	Trevor Jenkins	Middle Tennessee
DL	Aaron Morgan	UL Monroe
DL	Dion Gales	Troy
LB	Ben Owens	Arkansas State
LB	Bear Woods	Troy
LB	Tobe Nwigwe	North Texas
DB	Derik Keyes	UL Lafayette
DB	Josh Thompson	UL Monroe
DB	Jeremy Kellem	Middle Tennessee
DB	Tavares Williams	Troy
Second-team Special Teams
K	Sam Glusman	Troy
P	Carlos Munera	FIU
RS	Kevin Jones	Arkansas State
All-purpose	Jason Chery	UL Lafayette
