= 2008 Louisiana–Lafayette Ragin' Cajuns football team =

American college football season

2008 Louisiana–Lafayette Ragin' Cajuns football
- Conference: Sun Belt Conference
- Record: 6–6 (5–2 Sun Belt)
- Head coach: Rickey Bustle (7th season)
- Offensive coordinator: Ron Hudson (1st season)
- Offensive scheme: Multiple
- Defensive coordinator: Kevin Fouquier (2nd season)
- Base defense: Multiple
- Home stadium: Cajun Field

2008 Sun Belt Conference football standings
	Conf.			Overall
Team	W		L	W		L
Troy $	6	–	1	8	–	5
Louisiana–Lafayette	5	–	2	6	–	6
Florida Atlantic	4	–	3	7	–	6
Arkansas State	4	–	3	6	–	6
FIU	3	–	4	5	–	7
Middle Tennessee	3	–	4	5	–	7
Louisiana–Monroe	3	–	4	4	–	8
North Texas	0	–	7	1	–	11
$ – Conference champion

The 2008 Louisiana–Lafayette Ragin' Cajuns football team represented the University of Louisiana at Lafayette in the 2008 NCAA Division I FBS football season. Louisiana–Lafayette competed as a member of the Sun Belt Conference, and played their home games at Cajun Field. The Ragin' Cajuns were led by seventh-year head coach Rickey Bustle. UL-Lafayette finished the season with a 6–6 record (Sun Belt: 5–2).

Louisiana–Lafayette came close to an upset against 24th-ranked Illinois at home but ultimately lost, 20–17. The Ragin' Cajuns were also competitive against Kansas State, trailing by 42–37 late in that game, but Louisiana-Lafayette was hindered by ten penalties, twice as many as called against their opponent. Louisiana-Lafayette beat Arkansas State with a touchdown in the last 0:42 to play and won, 28–23. They defeated Florida International decisively, 49–20, before losing to UTEP in Lafayette. lost to Florida Atlantic after trailing, 40–7, in the final quarter. The following week, they were routed by eventual Sun Belt champions Troy, 48–3. UL-Lafayette won their finale against Middle Tennessee, 42–28, which gave the Cajuns their sixth win, and with it, bowl eligibility. The Ragin' Cajuns also finished second in the Sun Belt Conference with a 5–2 mark in league play. It was the third season in four years that the Cajuns became bowl eligible, but the Cajuns did not receive a bowl bid.

== Preseason ==
=== Award Watchlist ===
Award	Player	Position	Year
Rimington Trophy	Chris Fisher	C	JR
Lou Groza Award	Drew Edminston	PK	SR
Doak Walker Award	Tyrell Fenroy	RB	SR
Draddy Trophy	Michael Desormeaux	QB	SR

=== Sun Belt Media Day ===
==== Preseason Standings ====
Sun Belt Conference Predicted Standings
Predicted finish	Team	Votes (1st Place)
1	Florida Atlantic	62 (6)
2	Troy	51 (1)
3	Louisiana-Monroe	46 (1)
4	Arkansas State	39
5	Middle Tennessee	32
6	Louisiana-Lafayette	26
7	North Texas	19
8	Florida International	13

==== Preseason All-Conference Team ====
Offense

RB Tyrell Fenroy
OL Chris Fisher

Special teams

PK Drew Edmiston

== Roster ==
2008 Louisiana-Lafayette Ragin' Cajuns football team roster
Players
Coaches
Offense

Pos.	#	Name	Class
QB	3	Brady Thomas	Fr
RB	5	Jason Chery	Sr
QB	6	Michael Desormeaux	Sr
WR	7	Caleb Rubin	Sr
QB	8	Brad McGuire	Fr
QB	11	Chris Masson	Fr
WR	15	Verlin Moore	So
QB	16	Keldric White	Fr
QB	17	Blaine Gautier	Fr
WR	18	Derrick Smith	Sr
WR	19	Marlin Miller	So
RB	20	Ian Roberts	Fr
WR	21	Lance Kelley	Fr
WR	22	Antwain Keyes	Fr
RB	25	Undrea Sails	Jr
RB	26	Yobes Walker	Fr
FB	27	Phillip Walker	Jr
RB	31	Draylon Booker	Fr
RB	31	Deon Wallace	Jr
RB	32	Tyrell Fenroy	Sr
RB	33	Julian Shankle	Fr
FB	34	Geoffrey McCullough	Jr
RB	40	Matt Dupre	Jr
FB	44	Jonathan Thomas	Fr
FB	45	Chancellor Roberson	Sr
TE	46	Matt Desormeaux	So
OT	51	Colin Windsor	So
OT	55	Brad Bryant	Jr
G	60	Ian Burks	So
OL	61	Mike Muguira	Fr
G	63	Josh Robinson	Fr
OT	66	Nasser Jamal	So
OT	67	Sean Osborne	Fr
OT	67	Jesse Newman	Sr
C	68	Matthew Autrey	Fr
OL	70	Evan Ruiz	Fr
OL	72	Leonardo Bates	Fr
OT	73	Jonathan DeCoster	So
OL	74	Kyle Plouhar	Fr
G	75	Brad Bustle	Jr
OL	76	Jaron Odom	Fr
C	77	Byrnes Tatford	Fr
OT	78	Kyle Pirtle	Jr
C	79	Chris Fisher	Jr
WR	80	Darrius Duffy	Jr
TE	80	Dusty Mack	Jr
WR	81	Richie Falgout	So
WR	82	Jawanza Mitchell	Fr
WR	83	Ryan Finney	Sr
WR	83	Pierre Hill	Fr
WR	84	Louis Lee	Jr
TE	85	Luke Aubrey	Jr
TE	86	Matt Ulm	Jr
TE	87	Brendan Wilson	Fr
TE	88	Erik Jones	Sr
TE	89	Ladarius Green	Fr
WR		Matt Campbell	Fr

Defense

Pos.	#	Name	Class
CB	2	Orkeys Auriene	So
CB	3	Justin Branden	Sr
LB	4	Daylon McCoy	So
LB	10	Fred Davis	So
CB	13	Scooter Rogers	Sr
CB	17	Ken Dandridge	Jr
CB	17	Ross Goodlett	Fr
SS	20	Derik Keyes	Sr
CB	22	Dwight Bentley	Fr
CB	23	Junior Jean	Jr
SS	24	Phillip Nevels	Jr
SS	25	Frantz Accime	So
FS	26	Justin Lee	Sr
CB	27	Daryl Hampton	Fr
DE	29	Jonathon Vance	Sr
FS	30	Gerren Blount	Jr
SS	31	Devon Lewis-Buchanan	Fr
DB	33	Melvin White	Fr
FS	36	Maurice Rolle	So
CB	38	Rodney Gillis	Fr
FS	38	Seth Guilbeaux	So
DB	39	Tim Jackson	Fr
SS	39	Julian Jones	So
LB	40	Chris Richard	Fr
LB	41	Antwyne Zanders	Sr
LB	43	Brenton Burkhalter	Sr
LB	44	Kyron Benoit	Fr
DE	45	Emeke Onyenekwu	Fr
LB	47	Grant Fleming	So
DE	50	Jeremy Cook	So
LB	52	Jesse Broadnax	Fr
LB	53	Jezreel Washington	Jr
LB	56	Richard Brooks	Fr
LB	57	Fred Okoye	Fr
DE	58	Nate Douglas	Fr
DT	61	Bobby Fails	Sr
DE	62	Brandon Williams	Fr
DT	64	Ben Duhon	Fr
DE	65	Kyle Cox	Fr
DT	69	Ross Graham	So
DT	71	Jordan Hanby	Fr
DE	71	Trace Wilson	Fr
DT	72	Chris Johnson	So
DT	90	Derreck Dean	Fr
DT	91	Sharrick Moore	So
DT	92	Tory Day	Fr
DE	93	Hall Davis	Jr
DT	94	Jermaine Rogers	So
DT	95	LaQuincy Williams	Jr
DE	96	Chris Lanaux	Jr
DE	97	Terrell Richardson	So
DT	98	Lanier Coleman	Sr
DT	99	Seth Adams	Sr
LB		Matt Lafeaux	Fr

Special teams

Pos.	#	Name	Class
P	35	Spencer Ortego	So
P	37	Brett Baer	Fr
K	48	Drew Edminston	Sr
LS	52	Matt Rosenbalm	Fr
LS	54	Scott Hayes	Jr

Head coach

- Rickey Bustle (Clemson)

Coordinators/assistant coaches

- Ron Hudson (Louisville)
  Offensive coordinator
- Kevin Fouquier (Texas A&M)
  Defensive coordinator
- Jorge Munoz (Bethany (KS))
  Assistant coach
- Troy Wingerter (Louisiana)
  Assistant head coach

Legend

- (C) Team captain
- (S) Suspended
- (I) Ineligible
- Injured
- Redshirt

Roster

== Schedule ==
Date	Time	Opponent	Site	TV	Result	Attendance
August 30	6:00 pm	at Southern Miss*	M. M. Roberts Stadium; Hattiesburg, Mississippi		L 21–51	32,792
September 13	11:00 am	at No. 24 Illinois*	Memorial Stadium; Champaign, Illinois	BTN	L 17–20	58,632
September 20	6:00 pm	Kent State*	Cajun Field; Lafayette, Louisiana		W 44–27	18,241
September 27	2:35 pm	at Kansas State*	Bill Snyder Family Football Stadium; Manhattan, Kansas		L 37–45	45,558
October 4	6:00 pm	at Louisiana–Monroe	Malone Stadium; Monroe, Louisiana (Battle on the Bayou)		W 44–35	21,929
October 11	6:00 pm	at North Texas	Fouts Field; Denton, Texas		W 59–30	17,106
October 18	6:00 pm	Arkansas State	Cajun Field; Lafayette, Louisiana		W 28–23	23,684
November 1	4:05 pm	Florida International^{†}	Cajun Field; Lafayette, Louisiana	ESPN+	W 49–20	29,031
November 8	6:00 pm	UTEP*	Cajun Field; Lafayette, Louisiana	ESPN360	L 24–37	21,065
November 15	3:00 pm	at Florida Atlantic	Lockhart Stadium; Fort Lauderdale, Florida		L 29–40	14,338
November 22	6:00 pm	at Troy	Movie Gallery Stadium; Troy, Alabama		L 3–48	19,443
December 3	6:00 pm	Middle Tennessee	Cajun Field; Lafayette, Louisiana	ESPN+	W 42–28	15,321
*Non-conference game; ^{†}Homecoming; Rankings from Coaches' Poll released prior to the game; All times are in Eastern time

== Game summaries ==
=== @ Southern Miss ===
Louisiana-Lafayette at Southern Mississippi – Game summary

Quarter	1	2	3	4	Total
Ragin' Cajuns	0	14	0	7	21
Golden Eagles	14	20	10	7	51

at M. M. Roberts Stadium, Hattiesburg, MS

- Date: August 30
- Game time: 6:00 p.m. CST
- Game weather: 92 °F (33 °C); sunny
- Game attendance: 32,792
- Referee: Ed Ardito

Game information

First quarter

- USM - Damion Fletcher 14-yard TD run, Britt Barefoot kick good, 11:08 (USM 7-0)
- USM - Ed Morgan 23-yard TD pass from Austin Davis, Barefoot kick good, 4:49 (USM 14-0)

Second quarter

- USM - Davis 1-yard TD run, Barefoot kick good, 13:51 (USM 21-0)
- ULL - Julian Shankle 1-yard TD run, Drew Edmiston kick good, 8:12 (USM 21-7)
- USM - Fletcher 6-yard TD run, Barefoot kick good, 6:31 (USM 28-7)
- ULL - Tyrell Fenroy 3-yard TD run, Edmiston kick good, 1:56 (USM 28-14)
- USM - Davis 1-yard TD run, Barefoot kick no good, 0:13 (USM 34-14)

Third quarter

- USM - Barefoot 25-yard field goal, 10:49 (USM 37-14)
- USM - Bubba Kirksey 3-yard TD run, Barefoot kick good, 4:09 (USM 44-14)

Fourth quarter

- USM - DeAndre Brown 29-yard TD pass from Davis, Barefoot kick good, 13:53 (USM 51-14)
- ULL - Pierre Hill 21-yard TD pass from Brad McGuire, Edminston kick good, 8:55 (USM 51-21)

Top passers

- USM - Anthony Davis - 14/21, 206 yards, 2 TD, INT
- ULL - Michael Desormeaux - 9/20, 98 yards, 2 INT

Top rushers

- USM - Damion Fletcher - 21 carries, 222 yards, 2 TD
- ULL - Michael Desormeaux - 16 carries, 146 yards

Top receivers

- USM - DeAndre Brown - 4 receptions, 92 yards, TD
- ULL - Jason Chery - 3 receptions, 47 yards

=== @ Illinois ===
Louisiana-Lafayette at Illinois – Game summary

Quarter	1	2	3	4	Total
Ragin' Cajuns	3	0	0	14	17
No. 24 Fighting Illini	10	7	0	3	20

at Memorial Stadium, Champaign, IL

- Date: September 13
- Game time: 11:00 a.m. CST
- Game weather: 80 °F (27 °C); partly sunny
- Game attendance: 58,632
- Referee: Dennis Lipski
- TV: BTN

Game information

First quarter

- ILL - Matt Eller 51-yard field goal, 8:19 (ILL 3-0)
- ILL - Brit Miller 27-yard fumble return for TD, Eller kick good, 7:03 (ILL 10-0)
- ULL - Drew Edmiston 24-yard field goal, 0:12 (ILL 10-3)

Second quarter

- ILL - Daniel Dufrene 10-yard TD pass from Juice Williams, Eller kick good, 6:26 (ILL 17-3)

Fourth quarter

- ULL - Michael Desormeaux 34-yard TD run, Edmiston kick good, 5:30 (ILL 17-10)
- ILL - Eller 27-yard field goal, 1:36 (ILL 20-10)
- ULL - Erik Jones 11-yard TD pass from Desormeaux, Edmiston kick good, 0:18 (ILL 20-17)

Top passers

- ILL - Juice Williams - 13/25, 147 yards, TD, INT
- ULL - Michael Desormeaux - 25/35, 200 yards, TD

Top rushers

- ILL - Daniel Dunfrene - 19 carries, 126 yards
- ULL - Michael Desormeaux - 14 carries, 42 yards, TD

Top receivers

- ILL - Michael Hoomanawanui - 5 receptions, 72 yards
- ULL - Jason Chery - 5 receptions, 58 yards

=== Kent State ===
Kent State at Louisiana-Lafayette – Game summary

Quarter	1	2	3	4	Total
Golden Flashes	7	7	7	6	27
Ragin' Cajuns	10	13	14	7	44

at Cajun Field, Lafayette, LA

- Date: September 20
- Game time: 6:00 p.m. CST
- Game weather: 73 °F (23 °C); cloudy
- Game attendance: 18,241
- Referee: Chuck Lewis

Game information

First quarter

- KENT - Julian Edelman 11-yard TD run, Nate Reed kick good, 11:11 (KENT 7-0)
- ULL - Drew Edminston 20-yard field goal, 5:14 (KENT 7-3)
- ULL - Tyrell Fenroy 5-yard TD run, Edminston kick good, 0:14 (ULL 10-7)

Second quarter

- KENT - Shawn Bayes 42-yard TD pass from Edelman, Reed kick good, 5:58 (KENT 14-10)
- ULL - Michael Desormeaux 5-yard TD run, Edminston kick no good, 4:17 (ULL 16-14)
- ULL - Fenroy 69-yard TD run, Edmiston kick good, 2:43 (ULL 23-14)

Third quarter

- KENT - Edelman 6-yard TD run, Reed kick good, 11:07 (ULL 23-21)
- ULL - Ladarius Green 55-yard TD pass from Desormeaux, Edmiston kick good, 9:47 (ULL 30-21)
- ULL - Jason Chery 47-yard TD run, Edmiston kick good, 6:28 (ULL 37-21)

Fourth quarter

- ULL - Fenroy 1-yard TD run, Edmiston kick good, 12:05 (ULL 44-21)
- KENT - Alan Vanderink 81-yard TD pass from Anthony Magazu, Reed kick no good, 8:33 (ULL 44-27)

Top passers

- ULL - Michael Desormeaux - 15/22, 253 yards, TD
- KENT - Julian Edelman - 10/20, 81 yards, TD, INT

Top rushers

- ULL - Tyrell Fenroy - 23 carries, 194 yards, 3 TD
- KENT - Julian Edelman - 19 carries, 136 yards, 2 TD

Top receivers

- ULL - Ladarius Green - 3 receptions, 72 yards, TD
- KENT - Alan Vanderink - 2 receptions, 83 yards, TD

=== @ Kansas State ===
Louisiana-Lafayette at Kansas State – Game summary

Quarter	1	2	3	4	Total
Ragin' Cajuns	3	7	20	7	37
Wildcats	7	21	14	3	45

at Bill Snyder Family Football Stadium, Manhattan, KS

- Date: September 27
- Game time: 2:35 p.m. CST
- Game weather: 86 °F (30 °C); sunny
- Game attendance: 45,558
- Referee: R. Loumiet

Game information

First quarter

- ULL - Drew Edmiston 23-yard field goal, 10:17 (ULL 3-0)
- KSU - Deon Murphy 12-yard TD pass from Josh Freeman, Brooks Rossman kick good, 3:55 (KSU 7-3)

Second quarter

- KSU - Freeman 7-yard TD run, Rossman kick good, 13:43 (KSU 14-3)
- KSU - Freeman 15-yard TD run, Rossman kick good, 10:32 (KSU 21-3)
- KSU - Murphy 3-yard TD pass from Freeman, Rossman kick good, 3:43 (KSU 28-3)
- ULL - Tyrell Fenroy 15-yard TD run, Edmiston kick good, 0:43 (KSU 28-10)

Third quarter

- ULL - Jason Chery 27-yard TD pass from Richie Falgout, Edmiston kick good, 14:42 (KSU 28-17)
- KSU - Lamark Brown 3-yard TD run, Rossman kick good, 9:48 (KSU 35-17)
- ULL - Michael Desormeaux 1-yard TD run, Edmiston kick no good, 3:21 (KSU 35-23)
- KSU - Brandon Banks 53-yard TD pass from Freeman, Rossman kick good, 1:49 (KSU 42-23)
- ULL - Fenroy 69-yard TD run, Edmiston kick good, 0:34 (KSU 42-30)

Fourth quarter

- ULL - Fenroy 1-yard TD run, Edmiston kick good, 8:49 (KSU 42-37)
- KSU - Rossman 26-yard field goal, 1:37 (KSU 45-37)

Top passers

- KSU - Josh Freeman - 21/28, 272 yards, 3 TD
- ULL - Michael Desormeaux - 14/27, 136 yards

Top rushers

- KSU - Lamark Brown - 29 carries, 137 yards, TD
- ULL - Tyrell Fenroy - 20 carries, 183 yards, 3 TD

Top receivers

- KSU - Brandon Banks - 6 receptions, 127 yards, TD
- ULL - Jason Chery - 7 receptions, 80 yards, TD

=== @ Louisiana-Monroe ===
Louisiana-Lafayette at Louisiana-Monroe – Game summary

Quarter	1	2	3	4	Total
Ragin' Cajuns	6	7	21	10	44
Warhawks	3	6	13	13	35

at Malone Stadium, Monroe, LA

- Date: October 4
- Game time: 6:00 p.m. CST
- Game weather: 81 °F (27 °C); sunny
- Game attendance: 21,929
- Referee: Matt Loeffler

Game information

First quarter

- ULM - Radi Jabour 42-yard field goal, 6:48 (ULM 3-0)
- ULL - Tyrell Fenroy 89-yard TD run, Drew Edmiston kick no good, 6:31 (ULL 6-3)

Second quarter

- ULL - Michael Desormeaux 64-yard TD run, Edmiston kick good, 14:51 (ULL 13-3)
- ULM - Jabour 19-yard field goal, 2:48 (ULL 13-6)
- ULM - Jabour 39-yard field goal, 0:07 (ULL 13-9)

Third quarter

- ULL - Jason Chery 87-yard TD run, Edmiston kick good, 13:53 (ULL 20-9)
- ULL - Chery 74-yard TD pass from Desormeaux, Edmiston kick good, 11:07 (ULL 27-9)
- ULM - Darrell McNeal 3-yard TD run, Jabour kick good, 9:36 (ULL 27-16)
- ULL - Fenroy 52-yard TD run, Edmiston kick good, 7:48 (ULL 34-16)
- ULM - Frank Goodin 4-yard TD run, Jabour kick no good, 1:51 (ULL 34-22)

Fourth quarter

- ULM Greg James 55-yard interception returned for TD, Jabour kick good, 14:49 (ULL 34-29)
- ULL - Edmiston 25-yard field goal, 7:36 (ULL 37-29)
- ULM - Goodin 11-yard TD run, Jabour kick no good, 5:42 (ULL 37-35)
- ULL - Fenroy 80-yard TD run, Edmiston kick good, 5:20 (ULL 44-35)

Top passers

- ULL - Michael Desormeaux - 15/23, 172 yards, TD, 2 INT
- ULM - Kinsmon Lancaster - 10/19, 115 yards

Top rushers

- ULL - Tyrell Fenroy - 20 carries, 297 yards, 3 TD
- ULM - Trey Revell - 6 carries, 92 yards

Top receivers

- ULL - Jason Chery - 6 receptions, 96 yards, TD
- ULM - Zeek Zacharie - 2 receptions, 41 yards

=== @ North Texas ===
Louisiana-Lafayette at North Texas – Game summary

Quarter	1	2	3	4	Total
Ragin' Cajuns	14	21	10	14	59
Mean Green	10	10	7	3	30

at Fouts Field, Denton, TX

- Date: October 11
- Game time: 6:00 p.m. CST
- Game attendance: 17,106

Game information

First quarter

- UNT - Jeremy Knott 46-yard field goal, 10:59 (UNT 3-0)
- ULL - Jason Chery 81-yard TD run, Drew Edmiston kick good, 10:02 (ULL 7-3)
- UNT - Roderick Johnson 12-yard TD pass from Giovanni Vizza, Knott kick good, 7:56 (UNT 10-7)
- ULL - Chery 17-yard TD pass from Michael Desormeaux, Edmiston kick good, 0:54 (ULL 14-10)

Second quarter

- ULL - Chery 49-yard TD pass from Desormeaux, Edmiston kick good, 13:01 (ULL 21-10)
- UNT - Knott 43-yard field goal, 10:23 (ULL 21-13)
- ULL - Chery 97-yard kickoff returned for TD, Edmiston kick good, 10:08 (ULL 28-13)
- ULL - Chery 57-yard TD pass from Desormeaux, Edmiston kick good, 5:57 (ULL 35-13)
- UNT - Cam Montgomery 1-yard TD run, Knott kick good, 2:25 (ULL 35-20)

Third quarter

- UNT - Casey Fitzgerald 43-yard TD pass from Vizza, Knott kick good, 11:07 (ULL 35-27)
- ULL - Edmiston 45-yard field goal, 3:55 (ULL 37-27)
- ULL - Desormeaux 31-yard TD run, Edmiston kick good, 0:00 (ULL 45-27)

Fourth quarter

- UNT - Knott 24-yard field goal, 12:03 (ULL 45-30)
- ULL - Tyrell Fenroy 1-yard TD run, Edmiston kick good, 8:48 (ULL 52-30)
- ULL - Matt Dupre 6-yard TD run, Edmiston kick good, 4:42 (ULL 59-30)

Top passers

- ULL - Michael Desormeaux - 14/20, 217 yards, 3 TD, INT
- UNT - Giovanni Vizza - 29/44, 361 yards, 2 TD, INT

Top rushers

- ULL - Michael Desormeaux - 15 carries, 123 yards, TD
- UNT - Cam Montgomery - 20 carries, 116 yards, TD

Top receivers

- ULL - Jason Chery - 3 receptions, 123 yards, 3 TD
- UNT - Casey Fitzgerald - 14 receptions, 231 yards, TD

=== Arkansas State ===
Arkansas State at Louisiana-Lafayette – Game summary

Quarter	1	2	3	4	Total
Red Wolves	3	7	3	10	23
Ragin' Cajuns	0	7	7	14	28

at Cajun Field, Lafayette, LA

- Date: October 18
- Game time: 6:00 p.m. CST
- Game weather: 75 °F (24 °C); clear skies
- Game attendance: 23,684
- Referee: Jeff Hilyer

Game information

First quarter

- ARST - Josh Arauco 20-yard field goal, 6:24 (ARST 3-0)

Second quarter

- ARST - Brandon Thompkins 11-yard TD pass from Corey Leonard, Arauco kick good, 6:57 (ARST 10-0)
- ULL - Luke Aubrey 18-yard TD pass from Richie Falgout, Drew Edmiston kick good, 5:43 (ARST 10-7)

Third quarter

- ULL - Brad McGuire 1-yard TD run, Edmiston kick good, 6:05 (ULL 14-10)
- ARST - Arauco 42-yard field goal, 3:03 (ULL 14-13)

Fourth quarter

- ARST - Arauco 41-yard field goal, 7:55 (ARST 16-14)
- ARST - Darius Glover 29-yard interception returned for TD, Arauco kick good, 7:39 (ARST 23-14)
- ULL - McGuire 4-yard TD run, Edmiston kick good, 4:16 (ARST 23-21)
- ULL - Tyrell Fenroy 9-yard TD run, Edmiston kick good, 0:42 (ULL 28-23)

Top passers

- ULL - Brad McGuire - 9/16, 106 yards, 2 INT
- ARST - Corey Leonard - 21/40, 235 yards, TD, INT

Top rushers

- ULL - Tyrell Fenroy - 22 carries, 128 yards, TD
- ARST - Reggie Arnold - 15 carries, 65 yards

Top receivers

- ULL - Derrick Smith - 2 receptions, 44 yards
- ARST - Brandon Thompkins - 5 receptions, 58 yards, TD

=== FIU ===
Florida International at Louisiana-Lafayette – Game summary

Quarter	1	2	3	4	Total
Golden Panthers	14	0	0	6	20
Ragin' Cajuns	7	28	14	0	49

at Cajun Field, Lafayette, LA

- Date: November 1
- Game time: 4:00 p.m. CST
- Game weather: 74 °F (23 °C); sunny, clear skies
- Game attendance: 29,031
- Referee: Jeff Roberson

Game information

First quarter

- FIU - T. Y. Hilton 90-yard kickoff return for TD, Dustin Rivest kick good, 14:46 (FIU 7-0)
- ULL - Ladarius Green 6-yard TD pass from Michael Desormeaux, Drew Edmiston kick good, 6:42 (TIE 7-7)
- FIU - Julian Reams 1-yard TD run, Rivest kick good, 0:53 (FIU 14-7)

Second quarter

- ULL - Tyrell Fenroy 4-yard TD run, Edmiston kick good, 11:14 (TIE 14-14)
- ULL - Gerren Blount 22-yard fumble returned for TD, Edmiston kick good, 11:05 (ULL 21-14)
- ULL - Fenroy 3-yard TD run, Edmiston kick good, 7:40 (ULL 28-14)
- ULL - Jason Chery 25-yard TD pass from Desormeaux, Edmiston kick good, 0:36 (ULL 35-14)

Third quarter

- ULL - Fenroy 1-yard TD run, Edmiston kick good, 13:50 (ULL 42-14)
- ULL - Julian Shankle 2-yard TD run, Edmiston kick good, 4:47 (ULL 49-14)

Fourth quarter

- FIU - Eric Kirchenberg 10-yard TD pass from Wayne Younger, Rivest kick no good, 1:21 (ULL 49-20)

Top passers

- ULL - Michael Desormeaux - 13/19, 216 yards, 2 TD
- FIU - Paul McCall - 9/21, 85 yards, INT

Top rushers

- ULL - Tyrell Fenroy - 22 carries, 81 yards, 3 TD
- FIU - Julian Reams - 11 carries, 70 yards, TD

Top receivers

- ULL - Richie Falgout - reception, 82 yards
- FIU - T. Y. Hilton - 4 receptions, 96 yards

=== UTEP ===
UTEP at Louisiana-Lafayette – Game summary

Quarter	1	2	3	4	Total
Miners	7	9	14	7	37
Ragin' Cajuns	7	3	7	7	24

at Cajun Field, Lafayette, LA

- Date: November 8
- Game time: 6:00 p.m. CST
- Game weather: 65 °F (18 °C); clear
- Game attendance: 21,065
- Referee: Perry Havener
- TV: ESPN+

Game information

First quarter

- ULL - Gerren Blount 55-yard interception returned for TD, Drew Edmiston kick good, 13:21 (ULL 7-0)
- UTEP - Jeff Moturi 16-yard TD pass from Trevor Vittatoe, Jose Martinez kick good, 1:51 (TIE 7-7)

Second quarter

- ULL - Edmiston 20-yard field goal, 11:56 (ULL 10-7)
- UTEP - Martinez 28-yard field goal, 8:23 (TIE 10-10)
- UTEP - Tufick Shadrawy 32-yard TD pass from Vittatoe, Martinez kick no good, 0:52 (UTEP 16-10)

Third quarter

- UTEP - Kris Adams 7-yard TD pass from Vittatoe, Martinez kick good, 7:33 (UTEP 23-10)
- UTEP - Moturi 7-yard TD pass from Vittatoe, Martinez kick good, 5:24 (UTEP 30-10)
- ULL - Tyrell Fenroy 3-yard TD run, Edmiston kick good, 2:01 (UTEP 30-17)

Fourth quarter

- UTEP - Adams 23-yard TD pass from Vittatoe, Martinez kick good, 12:43 (UTEP 37-17)
- ULL - Ladarius Green 9-yard TD pass from Michael Desormeaux, Edmiston kick good, 8:23 (UTEP 37-24)

Top passers

- UTEP - Trevor Vittatoe - 24/33, 294 yards, 5 TD, INT
- ULL - Michael Desormeaux - 14/25, 185 yards, TD, 3 INT

Top rushers

- UTEP - Terrell Jackson - 14 carries, 105 yards
- ULL - Tyrell Fenroy - 22 carries, 126 yards, TD

Top receivers

- UTEP - Kris Adams - 6 receptions, 83 yards, 2 TD
- ULL - Tyrell Fenroy - 2 receptions, 58 yards

=== @ Florida Atlantic ===
Louisiana-Lafayette at Florida Atlantic – Game summary

Quarter	1	2	3	4	Total
Ragin' Cajuns	0	7	0	22	29
Owls	12	14	7	7	40

at Lockhart Stadium, Fort Lauderdale, FL

- Date: November 15
- Game time: 3:00 p.m. CST
- Game weather: 82 °F (28 °C); humid
- Game attendance: 14,338
- Referee: Jeff Hilyer

Game information

First quarter

- FAU - Charles Pierre 6-yard TD run, Warley Leroy kick no good, 13:25 (FAU 6-0)
- FAU - Chris Bonner 13-yard TD pass from Rusty Smith, Leroy kick no good, 7:30 (FAU 12-0)

Second quarter

- FAU - Rob Housler 14-yard TD pass from Smith, Leroy kick good, 10:12 (FAU 19-0)
- ULL - Tyrell Fenroy 14-yard TD run, Drew Edmiston kick good, 7:22 (FAU 19-7)
- FAU - Willie Rose 10-yard TD run, Leroy kick good, 0:48 (FAU 26-7)

Third quarter

- FAU - Housler 23-yard TD pass from Smith, Leroy kick good, 5:58 (FAU 33-7)

Fourth quarter

- FAU - Jamari Grant 5-yard TD pass from Smith, Leroy kick good, 13:07 (FAU 40-7)
- ULL - Ladarius Green 2-yard TD pass from Brad McGuire, Edmiston kick good, 7:44 (FAU 40-14)
- ULL - Scooter Rogers 30-yard fumble return for TD, Edmiston kick good, 6:20 (FAU 40-21)
- ULL - Luke Aubrey 30-yard TD pass from Chris Masson, Aubrey two-point conversion pass from Masson good, 1:28 (FAU 40-29)

Top passers

- FAU - Rusty Smith - 17/26, 290 yards, 4 TD
- ULL - Michael Desormeaux - 11/18, 84 yards, 2 INT

Top rushers

- FAU - Charles Pierre - 10 carries, 109 yards, TD
- ULL - Tyrell Fenroy - 18 carries, 92 yards, TD

Top receivers

- FAU - Jamari Grant - 5 receptions, 86 yards, TD
- ULL - Ladarius Green - 3 receptions, 39 yards, TD

=== @ Troy ===
Louisiana-Lafayette at Troy – Game summary

Quarter	1	2	3	4	Total
Ragin' Cajuns	0	3	0	0	3
Trojans	7	10	14	17	48

at Movie Gallery Stadium, Troy, AL

- Date: November 22
- Game time: 6:00 p.m. CST
- Game attendance: 19,443

Game information

First quarter

- TROY - DuJuan Harris 9-yard TD run, Sam Glusman kick good, 10:08 (TROY 7-0)

Second quarter

- TROY - Jorrick Calvin 65-yard field goal block return for TD, Glusman kick good, 14:49 (TROY 14-0)
- ULL - Drew Edmiston 29-yard field goal, 7:54 (TROY 14-3)
- TROY - Glusman 42-yard field goal, 4:21 (TROY 17-3)

Third quarter

- TROY - Mykeal Terry 5-yard TD pass from Harris, Glusman kick good, 10:39 (TROY 24-3)
- TROY - Kennard Burton 20-yard TD run, Glusman kick good, 4:44 (TROY 31-3)

Fourth quarter

- TROY - Glusman 40-yard field goal, 9:43 (TROY 34-3)
- TROY - Harris 35-yard TD run, Glusman kick good, 7:57 (TROY 41-3)
- TROY - Maurice Greer 1-yard TD run, Glusman kick good, 3:56 (TROY 48-3)

Top passers

- TROY - Levi Brown - 7/16, 51 yards
- ULL - Michael Desormeaux 7/13, 72 yards, INT

Top rushers

- TROY - DuJuan Harris - 28 carries, 234 yards, 2 TD
- ULL - Michael Desormeaux - 16 carries, 128 yards

Top receivers

- TROY - Justin Bray - reception, 17 yards
- ULL - Jason Chery - 4 receptions, 57 yards

=== Middle Tennessee ===
Middle Tennessee at Louisiana-Lafayette – Game summary

Quarter	1	2	3	4	Total
Blue Raiders	7	7	7	7	28
Ragin' Cajuns	14	7	7	14	42

at Cajun Field, Lafayette, LA

- Date: December 3
- Game time: 6:00 p.m. CST
- Game weather: 68 °F (20 °C); partly cloudy
- Game attendance: 15,321
- Referee: Jeff Hilyer

Game information

First quarter

- ULL - Luke Aubrey 4-yard TD pass from Michael Desormeaux, Drew Edmiston kick good, 10:45 (ULL 7-0)
- MTSU - Phillip Tanner 2-yard TD run, Alan Gendreau kick good, 8:41 (TIE 7-7)
- ULL - Tyrell Fenroy 4-yard TD run, Edmiston kick good, 2:16 (ULL 14-7)

Second quarter

- ULL - Fenroy 3-yard TD run, Edmiston kick good, 11:20 (ULL 21-7)
- MTSU - Tanner 4-yard TD run, Gendreau kick good, 6:18 (ULL 21-14)

Third quarter

- MTSU - Eldred King 22-yard TD pass from Joe Craddock, Gendreau kick good, 8:39 (TIE 21-21)
- ULL - Ladarius Green 5-yard TD pass from Desormeaux, Edmiston kick good, 5:23 (ULL 28-21)

Fourth quarter

- MTSU - Sancho McDonald 15-yard TD pass from Craddock, Gendreau kick good, 14:53 (TIE 28-28)
- ULL - Jason Chery 18-yard TD pass from Desormeaux, Edmiston kick good, 11:06 (ULL 35-28)
- ULL - Louis Lee 37-yard TD pass from Desormeaux, Edmiston kick good, 6:43 (ULL 42-28)

Top passers

- ULL - Michael Desormeaux - 18/25, 243 yards, 4 TD
- MTSU - Joe Craddock - 22/28, 242 yards, 2 TD, INT

Top rushers

- ULL - Tyrell Fenroy - 24 carries, 83 yards, 2 TD
- MTSU - Phillip Tanner - 23 carries, 78 yards, 2 TD

Top receivers

- ULL - Jason Chery - 6 receptions, 68 yards, TD
- MTSU - Sancho McDonald - 6 receptions, 98 yards, TD

== Postseason ==
=== All–Conference Team ===
First-Team Offense

QB Michael Desormeaux
RB Tyrell Fenroy
OL Brad Bustle
OL Chris Fisher

Second-Team Offense

WR Jason Chery

Second-Team Defense

DB Derik Keyes

Second-Team Special Teams

RS Jason Cherry

Honorable Mentions

OL Jonathan Decoster
LB Antwyne Zanders

=== Post-Season Awards ===
- Tyrell Fenroy, ULL - Player of the Year
- Michael Desormeaux, ULL - Offensive Player of the Year
- Alex Carrington, ASU - Defensive Player of the Year
- Levi Brown, TROY - Newcomer of the Year
- T. Y. Hilton, FIU – Freshman of the Year
- Larry Blakeney, TROY - Coach of the Year
