= 2008 Western Kentucky Hilltoppers football team =

American college football season

2008 Western Kentucky Hilltoppers football
- Conference: Independent
- Record: 2–10
- Head coach: David Elson (6th season)
- Offensive coordinator: Kevin Wright (2nd season)
- Offensive scheme: Spread
- Base defense: 3–4
- Home stadium: Houchens Industries–L. T. Smith Stadium

2008 NCAA Division I FBS independents football records
	Conf.			Overall
Team	W		L	W		L
Navy		–		8	–	5
Notre Dame		–		7	–	6
Army		–		3	–	9
WKU		–		2	–	10
Rankings from AP Poll

The 2008 Western Kentucky Hilltoppers football team represented Western Kentucky University (WKU) during the 2008 NCAA Division I FBS football season. The team's head coach was David Elson. WKU competed as an NCAA Division I FBS independent team in 2008 before their move to the Sun Belt Conference in 2009. The Hilltoppers played their home games at Houchens Industries–L. T. Smith Stadium in Bowling Green, Kentucky.

== Schedule ==
Date	Time	Opponent	Site	TV	Result	Attendance
August 30	11:00 a.m.	at Indiana	Memorial Stadium; Bloomington, IN	BTN	L 13–31	30,067
September 6	5:00 p.m.	at No. 22 FCS Eastern Kentucky	Roy Kidd Stadium; Richmond, KY (Battle of the Bluegrass)		W 37–13	18,500
September 13	6:00 p.m.	at No. 11 Alabama	Bryant–Denny Stadium; Tuscaloosa, AL	PPV	L 7–41	92,138
September 20	6:00 p.m.	Murray State	Houchens Industries–L. T. Smith Stadium; Bowling Green, KY (Battle for the Red Belt)		W 50–9	22,297
September 27	6:00 p.m.	at Kentucky	Commonwealth Stadium; Lexington, KY	WKYT	L 3–41	70,731
October 4	12:30 p.m.	at No. 20 Virginia Tech	Lane Stadium; Blacksburg, VA		L 13–27	66,233
October 11	6:00 p.m.	No. 25 Ball State	Houchens Industries–L. T. Smith Stadium; Bowling Green, KY		L 7–24	16,319
October 18	6:00 p.m.	Florida Atlantic	Houchens Industries–L. T. Smith Stadium; Bowling Green, KY		L 20–24	14,171
November 1	3:30 p.m.	North Texas^{†}	Houchens Industries–L. T. Smith Stadium; Bowling Green, KY	Sun Belt Network	L 40–51	18,879
November 8	2:30 p.m.	at Troy	Movie Gallery Stadium; Troy, AL	Sun Belt Network	L 7–17	19,066
November 15	12:00 p.m.	Middle Tennessee	Houchens Industries–L. T. Smith Stadium; Bowling Green, KY (100 Miles of Hate)	Sun Belt Network	L 10–21	11,817
December 6	6:00 p.m.	at Florida International	FIU Stadium; Miami, FL		L 3–27	9,405
^{†}Homecoming; Rankings from Coaches' Poll released prior to the game; All times are in Central time

== Coaching staff ==
Name	Position	Alma mater
David Elson	Head coach	Butler 1994
Mike Chism	Recruiting Coordinator/Tight Ends	Kentucky 1990
Mike Dietzel	Special Teams Coordinator/Outside Linebackers	Otterbein 1985
Stuart Holt	Running Backs	North Carolina 1995
Cary Marquell	Inside Linebackers	Ball State 1996
Erik Mathies	Defensive Line	Murray State 1998
Travaris Robinson	Defensive Backs	Auburn 2007
T.J. Weist	Assistant Head Coach/Wide Receivers/Passing Game Coordinator	Alabama 1988
Kevin Wright	Offensive Coordinator/Quarterbacks	WKU 1987
Walter Wells	Running Game Coordinator	Belmont 1993
Jami DeBerry	Graduate assistant	WKU 2005
Jamison Link	Student assistant	
Nick Uhlenhopp	Director of operations	Graceland 2002
Mark Harris	Dir. of equipment and facility operations	
Jim Nowell	Dir. of strength & conditioning	Southern Miss 1990
Duane Hall	Strength & conditioning assistant	WKU 1997
Chris Zuccaro	Video coordinator	Ole Miss 2004

== Game summaries ==
=== Indiana ===
	1	2	3	4	Total
Hilltoppers	0	0	6	7	13
Hoosiers	10	7	7	7	31

=== Eastern Kentucky ===
	1	2	3	4	Total
Hilltoppers	7	9	7	14	37
Colonels	3	10	0	0	13

=== Alabama ===
	1	2	3	4	Total
Hilltoppers	0	7	0	0	7
#11 Crimson Tide	17	14	10	0	41

=== Murray State ===
	1	2	3	4	Total
Racers	0	6	3	0	9
Hilltoppers	10	17	16	7	50

=== Kentucky ===
	1	2	3	4	Total
Hilltoppers	0	3	0	0	3
Wildcats	3	14	14	10	41

=== Virginia Tech ===
	1	2	3	4	Total
Hilltoppers	0	3	3	7	13
#20 Hokies	10	10	7	0	27

=== Ball St ===
	1	2	3	4	Total
#25 Cardinals	0	7	7	10	24
Hilltoppers	0	0	0	7	7

=== Florida Atlantic ===
	1	2	3	4	Total
Owls	0	21	0	3	24
Hilltoppers	3	14	3	0	20

=== North Texas ===
	1	2	3	4	Total
Mean Green	21	3	7	20	51
Hilltoppers	14	0	20	6	40

=== Troy ===
	1	2	3	4	Total
Hilltoppers	0	0	7	0	7
Trojans	7	7	3	0	17

=== Middle Tennessee ===
	1	2	3	4	Total
Blue Raiders	7	7	0	7	21
Hilltoppers	0	3	0	7	10

=== Florida International ===
	1	2	3	4	Total
Hilltoppers	3	0	0	0	3
Golden Panthers	0	7	6	14	27
