= Jervonte Jackson =

American gridiron football player (born 1986)

No. 91
- Position: Defensive tackle

Personal information
- Born: September 20, 1986 (age 40); Opa Locka, Florida
- Listed height: 6 ft 5 in (1.96 m)
- Listed weight: 300 lb (136 kg)

Career information
- High school: North Miami (FL)
- College: Florida Atlantic
- NFL draft: 2009: undrafted

Career history
- Philadelphia Eagles (2009)*; Jacksonville Jaguars (2009)*; Detroit Lions (2009)*; Billings Outlaws (2010); Omaha Beef (2011); Montreal Alouettes (2011)*; Nebraska Danger (2012–2015)
- * Offseason or practice squad member only

Awards and highlights
- United Bowl champion (2010); First-team All-Sun Belt (2008); 2× Second-team All-Sun Belt (2006, 2007)

Jervonte Jackson (born September 20, 1986) is an American former football defensive tackle. He was signed by the Philadelphia Eagles as an undrafted free agent in 2009. He played college football at Florida Atlantic.

Jackson was also a member of the Jacksonville Jaguars, Detroit Lions, Billings Outlaws, Omaha Beef, Montreal Alouettes, and Nebraska Danger.

== Early life ==
Jackson attended North Miami Beach High School in Miami, Florida where he played football under Coach Bertani. Jackson lettered in track and field, basketball and football. In football, he played on the offensive line and defensive line. As a senior, he had 11.5 sacks and 45 tackles along with 43 pancakes on the offensive line. He earned second-team All-Dade honors as a senior.

== College career ==
After high school, Jackson played college football at Florida Atlantic University from 2004–2008. As a freshman in 2004, he was redshirted in order to gain experience and size. In 2005, he played in every game for the Owls, and made 38 tackles along with one forced fumble, three hurries and a blocked pass and kick. In 2006, Jackson played and started in every game. He led all defensive linemen with 46 total tackles and had three sacks, two forced fumbles and three broken-up passes. In 2007, he had 28 total tackles and two sacks. As a senior in 2008, he had 41 tackles and 1.5 sacks and was named a first-team All-Sun Belt selection.

== Professional career ==
=== Pre-draft ===
Jackson was not invited to the NFL Combine and was only able to work out at Florida Atlantic's Pro Day.

Pre-draft measurables
Height	Weight	40-yard dash	10-yard split	20-yard split	20-yard shuttle	Three-cone drill	Vertical jump	Broad jump	Bench press
6 ft 3 in (1.91 m)	300 lb (136 kg)	5.07 s	1.68 s	2.96 s	4.78 s	7.57 s	23 1/2 in (0.60 m)	8 ft 2 in (2.49 m)	21 reps
All values from Pro Day workout

=== Philadelphia Eagles ===
Jackson was undrafted in the 2009 NFL draft and was signed by the Philadelphia Eagles on May 18, 2009. He was waived on August 4.

=== Jacksonville Jaguars ===
Jackson signed with the Jacksonville Jaguars on August 26, 2009 when the team waived defensive end Jeremy Mincey. He was waived on the first day of roster cuts on September 1.

=== Detroit Lions ===
Jackson was signed to the Detroit Lions practice squad on October 12, 2009. He was released on October 20.

=== Omaha Beef ===
Jackson was signed by the Omaha Beef of the Indoor Football League on December 1, 2010.

=== Montreal Alouettes ===
He was signed by the Montreal Alouettes of the Canadian Football League. He was released by the Alouettes on July 21, 2011.

=== Nebraska Danger ===
He was signed by the Nebraska Danger of the Indoor Football League and has played for the team since 2012.

== Personal life ==
Jackson has four sisters and seven brothers, one of which is Philadelphia Eagles offensive lineman Jamaal Jackson, who is his half-brother. At Florida Atlantic University, he majored in health administration.
