= Boris Lee =

American football player (born 1987)

Profile
- Position: Linebacker

Personal information
- Born: May 4, 1987 (age 39); Fargo, Georgia, U.S.
- Listed height: 6 ft 0 in (1.83 m)
- Listed weight: 235 lb (107 kg)

Career information
- College: Troy
- NFL draft: 2010: undrafted

Career history
- San Diego Chargers (2010)*; New York Jets (2010)*; Jacksonville Jaguars (2010)*; Tri-Cities Fever (2012–2014)
- * Offseason or practice squad member only

Awards and highlights
- 3× First-team All-Sun Belt (2007, 2008, 2009)

Boris Terrel Lee (born May 4, 1987) is an American former professional football linebacker. He was signed by the San Diego Chargers as an undrafted free agent in 2010. He played college football at Troy.

Lee was also a member of the New York Jets, Jacksonville Jaguars, and Tri-Cities Fever.

== Professional career ==
=== San Diego Chargers ===
Lee was signed on May 20, 2010, but was later released on June 9, 2010.

=== New York Jets ===
Lee was signed to a contract by the Jets on August 19, 2010. He was released by the Jets on September 3, 2010.

=== Jacksonville Jaguars ===
Lee was signed to the Jaguars practice squad on December 2, 2010. His practice squad contract expired on January 11, 2011.

=== Tri-Cities Fever ===
In 2012, Lee signed with the Tri-Cities Fever of the Indoor Football League.
