= Cardia Jackson =

American football player (born 1988)

No. 48
- Position: Linebacker

Personal information
- Born: April 13, 1988 (age 38); Monroe, Louisiana, U.S.
- Listed height: 6 ft 2 in (1.88 m)
- Listed weight: 240 lb (109 kg)

Career information
- High school: Wossman
- College: UL Monroe

Career history
- St. Louis Rams (2010)*; Green Bay Packers (2010–2011)*
- * Offseason or practice squad member only

Awards and highlights
- Super Bowl champion (XLV); Sun Belt Co-Defensive Player of the Year (2009); 2× First-team All-Sun Belt (2008, 2009); Second-team All-Sun Belt (2007)
- Stats at Pro Football Reference

Cardia Jackson (born April 13, 1988) is an American football linebacker. As a member of the Green Bay Packers, he won Super Bowl XLV over the Pittsburgh Steelers.

== College career ==
He played collegiately for the Louisiana–Monroe Warhawks of the University of Louisiana at Monroe. As a sophomore in 2007, Jackson was named to the second-team all-Sun Belt Conference team after finishing the season with 79 tackles. In 2008, Jackson made 127 tackles in 12 games, which was good enough for 8th in the NCAA in tackles per game. He also had two interceptions in 2008. Following the 2009 season, Jackson was named the Sun Belt Conference Defensive Player of the Year after leading the league with 117 tackles. Jackson became the conference's all-time leader in total tackles in week 10 against Western Kentucky.

== Professional career ==
After not being drafted in the 2010 NFL draft, Jackson signed with the Rams as an undrafted free agent.
