= Reggie Arnold =

American college football player (born 1987)

No. 25, 2
- Position: Running back

Personal information
- Born: March 30, 1987 (age 39); Little Rock, Arkansas, U.S.
- Listed height: 5 ft 9 in (1.75 m)
- Listed weight: 220 lb (100 kg)

Career information
- High school: McClellan (Little Rock, Arkansas)
- College: Arkansas State (2005–2009)

Awards and highlights
- Sun Belt Freshman of the Year (2006); First-team All-Sun Belt (2008); 2× Second-team All-Sun Belt (2006, 2007)

Reggie Arnold (born March 30, 1987) is an American former football running back who played college football for the Arkansas State Red Wolves.

While at Arkansas state, Arnold had three 1,000-yard rushing seasons. He accomplished the feat in 2006 (1,076), 2007 (1,060) and 2008 (1,074). He ranks second in Arkansas State school history with a career total of 3,933 rushing yards. He was named first-team Freshman All-American by Football Writers Association of America (FWAA) in 2006, and a Doak Walker Award candidate from 2007 to 2009.

== High school career ==
College recruiting
Name	Hometown	School	Height	Weight	40^{‡}	Commit date
Reggie Arnold; RB	Little Rock, Arkansas	McClellan Magnet High School	5 ft 10 in (1.78 m)	220 lb (100 kg)	4.4	Jan 6, 2005
Reggie Arnold; RB	Recruit ratings: Scout: Rivals:					
Overall recruit ranking: Scout: -- (RB) Rivals: -- (RB), -- (AR)
Note: In many cases, Scout, Rivals, 247Sports, On3, and ESPN may conflict in their listings of height and weight.; In these cases, the average was taken. ESPN grades are on a 100-point scale.; Sources: "Arkansas State Football Commitment List". Rivals.; "Arkansas State College Football Recruiting Commits". Scout.; "Scout.com Team Recruiting Rankings". Scout.; "2005 Team Ranking". Rivals.com.
