= 2008 Louisiana–Monroe Warhawks football team =

American college football season

2008 Louisiana–Monroe Warhawks football
- Conference: Sun Belt Conference
- Record: 4–8 (3–4 Sun Belt)
- Head coach: Charlie Weatherbie (6th season)
- Offensive coordinator: Steve Farmer (2nd season)
- Co-defensive coordinators: Phil Elmassian (1st season); Manny Michel (1st season)
- Home stadium: Malone Stadium

2008 Sun Belt Conference football standings
	Conf.			Overall
Team	W		L	W		L
Troy $	6	–	1	8	–	5
Louisiana–Lafayette	5	–	2	6	–	6
Florida Atlantic	4	–	3	7	–	6
Arkansas State	4	–	3	6	–	6
FIU	3	–	4	5	–	7
Middle Tennessee	3	–	4	5	–	7
Louisiana–Monroe	3	–	4	4	–	8
North Texas	0	–	7	1	–	11
$ – Conference champion

The 2008 Louisiana–Monroe Warhawks football team represented the University of Louisiana at Monroe in the 2008 NCAA Division I FBS football season. Louisiana–Monroe competed as a member of the Sun Belt Conference, and played their home games at Malone Stadium. The Warhawks were led by sixth-year head coach Charlie Weatherbie. ULM finished the season with a 4–8 record (3–4).

The Warhawks' season started with a fumble on the first play, which 10th-ranked Auburn returned for a touchdown. The Tigers eventually won that game, 34–0. The following week at Arkansas, ULM led in both the third quarter, 24–6, and fourth quarter, 27–14, but eventually lost, 28–27, after missing a 45-yard field goal attempt. Against Louisiana-Lafayette, ULM surrendered a school record of 728 yards. ULM had led Florida Atlantic, 21–10, at half time, but ultimately lost, 29–28, when the Owls scored on a 22-yard touchdown pass with 0:20 remaining to play. The next week, however, ULM upset eventual Sun Belt champions Troy, 31–30. The Warhawks were shut out by Ole Miss, 59–0, but won their season finale against Florida International, 31–27. ULM finished the season tied for fifth (second-to-last) in the Sun Belt Conference.

== Schedule ==
Date	Opponent	Site	Result	Attendance
August 30	at No. 10 Auburn*	Jordan–Hare Stadium; Auburn, AL	L 34–0	87,451
September 6	at Arkansas*	War Memorial Stadium; Little Rock, AR	L 28–27	55,048
September 12	Alabama A&M*	Malone Stadium; Monroe, LA	W 37–15	9,717
September 20	at Tulane*	Superdome; New Orleans, LA	L 24–10	23,419
October 4	Louisiana–Lafayette	Malone Stadium; Monroe, LA (Battle on the Bayou)	L 44–35	21,929
October 11	at Arkansas State	ASU Stadium; Jonesboro, AR	L 37–29	22,745
October 18	North Texas	Malone Stadium; Monroe, LA	W 35–23	10,388
October 25	Florida Atlantic	Malone Stadium; Monroe, LA	L 29–28	9,922
November 1	Troy	Malone Stadium; Monroe, LA	W 31–30	10,112
November 8	at Middle Tennessee State	Johnny "Red" Floyd Stadium; Murfreesboro, TN	L 24–21	16,150
November 15	at Mississippi*	Vaught–Hemingway Stadium; Oxford, MS	L 59–0	43,665
November 22	at FIU	FIU Stadium; Miami, FL	W 31–27	12,925
*Non-conference game; Rankings from AP Poll released prior to the game
