= 2008 Arkansas State Red Wolves football team =

American college football season

2008 Arkansas State Red Wolves football
- Conference: Sun Belt Conference
- Record: 6–6 (4–3 Sun Belt)
- Head coach: Steve Roberts (7th season)
- Offensive coordinator: Doug Ruse (7th season)
- Co-defensive coordinators: Kevin Corless (7th season); Jack Curtis (7th season)
- Home stadium: ASU Stadium

2008 Sun Belt Conference football standings
	Conf.			Overall
Team	W		L	W		L
Troy $	6	–	1	8	–	5
Louisiana–Lafayette	5	–	2	6	–	6
Florida Atlantic	4	–	3	7	–	6
Arkansas State	4	–	3	6	–	6
FIU	3	–	4	5	–	7
Middle Tennessee	3	–	4	5	–	7
Louisiana–Monroe	3	–	4	4	–	8
North Texas	0	–	7	1	–	11
$ – Conference champion

The 2008 Arkansas State Red Wolves football team represented Arkansas State University as a member of the Sun Belt Conference during the 2008 NCAA Division I FBS football season. Led by seventh-year head coach Steve Roberts, the Red Wolves compiled an overall record of 6–6 with a mark of 3–4 in conference play, tying for third place in the Sun Belt. Arkansas State played home games at ASU Stadium in Jonesboro, Arkansas

== Schedule ==
Date	Time	Opponent	Site	TV	Result	Attendance
August 30	6:00 p.m.	at Texas A&M*	Kyle Field; College Station, TX		W 18–14	78,691
September 6	6:00 p.m.	Texas Southern*	ASU Stadium; Jonesboro, AR		W 83–10	21,741
September 13	6:00 p.m.	Southern Miss*	ASU Stadium; Jonesboro, AR		L 24–27	25,938
September 20	6:00 p.m.	Middle Tennessee^{†}	ASU Stadium; Jonesboro, AR		W 31–14	24,256
September 27	1:00 p.m.	at Memphis*	Liberty Bowl Memorial Stadium; Memphis, TN (Paint Bucket Bowl)		L 17–29	26,376
October 11	6:00 p.m.	Louisiana–Monroe	ASU Stadium; Jonesboro, AR	ESPN Plus	W 37–29	22,745
October 18	6:00 p.m.	at Louisiana–Lafayette	Cajun Field; Lafayette, LA		L 23–28	23,684
November 1	2:07 p.m.	at No. 2 Alabama*	Bryant–Denny Stadium; Tuscaloosa, AL	PPV	L 0–35	92,138
November 8	6:00 p.m.	at FIU	FIU Stadium; Miami, FL		L 21–22	15,106
November 22	2:00 p.m.	Florida Atlantic	ASU Stadium; Jonesboro, AR	CSS	W 28–14	10,845
November 29	1:00 p.m.	at North Texas	Fouts Field; Denton, TX		W 33–28	9,761
December 6	6:00 p.m.	at Troy	Movie Gallery Stadium; Troy, AL	ESPNGP	L 9–35	16,227
*Non-conference game; ^{†}Homecoming; Rankings from AP Poll released prior to the game; All times are in Central time

== Game summaries ==
=== Texas A&M ===
	1	2	3	4	Total
Red Wolves	3	0	6	9	18
Aggies	7	7	0	0	14

This marked the fourth meeting between the Red Wolves and the Texas A&M Aggies, at the time, a member of the Big 12 Conference. ASU went into the game with a 0–3 all-time record against the Aggies; the third game occurred in 2003, the Aggies' 4–8 season.

ASU compiled 60 yards on the game opening possession, ending it with a 37-yard field goal. A&M answered with a 69-yard drive that resulted in a 9-yard touchdown run by tailback Mike Goodson. On their next possession, Arkansas State lost a fumble, allowing the Aggies to take over on downs on the A&M 28-yard line. The Aggies eventually moved to the Red Wolves 15-yard line, but faced a fourth-down situation. Kicker Richie Bean missed a 32-yard field goal to keep the score at 7–3. The Red Wolves' ensuing drive led to a punt, which A&M recovered at its 23-yard line. McGee cranked up A&M's passing game after making completions of 5, 13, 12, and 16 yards. Goodson soon scored a touchdown on a 7-yard run. Bean added the extra point to give A&M a 14–3 lead with 4:23 left in the half. Neither team could advance the ball for a touchdown over the remainder of the half.

In the second half, the Aggies' had four turnovers, three of which led to ASU scoring drives. Posting just 103 offensive yards – including 9 rushing – A&M failed to score on all eight of its possessions. In the third quarter, an interception and a fumble recovery let the Red Wolves to score two field goals, cutting the score to 14–9. In the fourth quarter, A&M kicker Richie Bean kicked a 25-yard field goal wide right. After the missed field goal, the ball was spotted on the ASU 20-yard line. ASU drove 80 yards into A&M territory for a touchdown to take the lead. Although their two-point conversion pass was incomplete, the Red Wolves could maintain their 15–14 advantage with 4:39 remaining in the game. On their next possession, the Aggies lost the ball on a fumble by Goodson after four plays. This set up ASU to kick its fourth successful field goal of the game to extend its lead to 18–14. Once the clock went down to 1:12, the Aggies looked to score on their final drive in order to win the game. On the third play of the drive, McGee threw a 26-yard pass to third-string quarterback Ryan Tannehill to move the ball to the ASU 39. Two subsequent passes to Goodson allowed only a net gain of 5 yards, and on fourth down – with 7 seconds remaining – McGee threw another interception. ASU ran out the clock to preserve their 18–14 victory.

The game attracted the second-largest home opener crowd of 78,691 for Texas A&M. By winning the game, ASU snapped A&M’s 20-game winning streak in home openers. ASU captured its first victory against a Big 12 team after 14 tries. It was also their first season-opening road victory since joining Division I-A in 1992. The game was called "one of the most embarrassing losses in [A&M] history" by several sport columnists. The team's performance also placed 5th in ESPN's Bottom 10 weekly rankings.

=== Texas Southern ===
	1	2	3	4	Total
Tigers	0	3	7	0	10
Red Wolves	31	21	17	14	83

Arkansas State became the first major college team to break the 80-point mark since Texas Tech scored 80 against Sam Houston State in 2005. The team posted the second-highest score in school history, topped only by a 101-point effort against the University of Central Arkansas in 1917.

=== Southern Miss ===
	1	2	3	4	Total
Golden Eagles	3	14	0	10	27
Red Wolves	3	0	14	7	24

=== Middle Tennessee ===
	1	2	3	4	Total
Blue Raiders	0	0	7	7	14
Red Wolves	7	10	7	7	31

Arkansas State played their homecoming game on September 20 against Middle Tennessee.

=== Memphis ===
	1	2	3	4	Total
Red Wolves	0	17	0	0	17
Tigers	13	3	3	10	29

=== Louisiana-Monroe ===
	1	2	3	4	Total
Warhawks	7	7	0	15	29
Red Wolves	7	20	7	3	37

=== Louisiana-Lafayette ===
	1	2	3	4	Total
Red Wolves	3	7	3	10	23
Ragin’ Cajuns	0	7	7	14	28

=== Alabama ===
	1	2	3	4	Total
Red Wolves	0	0	0	0	0
Crimson Tide	7	7	14	7	35

=== FIU ===
	1	2	3	4	Total
Red Wolves					0
Golden Panthers					0

=== Florida Atlantic ===
	1	2	3	4	Total
Owls					0
Red Wolves					0

=== North Texas ===
	1	2	3	4	Total
Red Wolves					0
Mean Green					0

=== Troy ===
	1	2	3	4	Total
Red Wolves	0	0	0	9	9
Trojans	7	14	0	14	35
