= Frantz Joseph =

American gridiron football player (born 1986)

No. 51
- Position: Linebacker

Personal information
- Born: June 12, 1986 (age 40); Fort Lauderdale, Florida, U.S.
- Listed height: 6 ft 3 in (1.91 m)
- Listed weight: 235 lb (107 kg)

Career information
- College: Florida Atlantic
- NFL draft: 2009: undrafted

Career history
- Oakland Raiders (2009)*; Edmonton Eskimos (2010)*; Hartford Colonials (2010); Spokane Shock (2012)*; Tri-Cities Fever (2012)
- * Offseason or practice squad member only

Awards and highlights
- 2× First-team All-Sun Belt (2007, 2008)

Frantz Joseph (born June 12, 1986) is an American former football linebacker. He was signed by the Oakland Raiders as an undrafted free agent in 2009. He played college football at Florida Atlantic.

Joseph was also a member of the Edmonton Eskimos, Hartford Colonials, Spokane Shock, and Tri-Cities Fever.

== Early life ==
Joseph is of Haitian descent. His mother came to the United States from Haiti as a teenager and raised five children. She became his inspiration to pursue a career in football.

== Professional career ==
=== Oakland Raiders ===
The Oakland Raiders, signed Joseph as an undrafted free agent following the 2009 NFL draft. He was waived by the Raiders on July 14, 2009.

=== Edmonton Eskimos ===
Joseph was signed to the Edmonton Eskimos practice roster on September 28, 2009.

=== Harford Colonials ===
Joseph signed with the Hartford Colonials of the United Football League in August 2010.

Joseph was the subject of a book released in 2010 by Bobby Deren entitled Draft Season: Four Months on the Clock.

=== Spokane Shock ===
Joseph signed with the Spokane Shock of the Arena Football League on September 29, 2011.
