= 2008 Central Michigan Chippewas football team =

American college football season

2008 Central Michigan Chippewas football

Motor City Bowl, L 21–24 vs. Florida Atlantic
- Conference: Mid-American Conference
- West Division
- Record: 8–5 (6–2 MAC)
- Head coach: Butch Jones (2nd season)
- Offensive coordinator: Mike Bajakian (2nd season)
- Defensive coordinator: Tim Banks (2nd season)
- Home stadium: Kelly/Shorts Stadium

2008 Mid-American Conference football standings
	Conf.			Overall
Team	W		L	W		L
East Division
Buffalo x$	5	–	3	8	–	6
Bowling Green	4	–	4	6	–	6
Temple	4	–	4	5	–	7
Ohio	3	–	5	4	–	8
Akron	3	–	5	5	–	7
Kent State	3	–	5	4	–	8
Miami (OH)	1	–	7	2	–	10
West Division
Ball State x	8	–	0	12	–	2
Central Michigan	6	–	2	8	–	5
Western Michigan	6	–	2	9	–	4
Northern Illinois	5	–	3	6	–	7
Toledo	2	–	6	3	–	9
Eastern Michigan	2	–	6	3	–	9
Championship: Buffalo 42, Ball State 24
$ – Conference champion; x – Division champion/co-champions

The 2008 Central Michigan Chippewas football team represented Central Michigan University during the 2008 NCAA Division I FBS football season. Central Michigan competed as a member of the West Division of the Mid-American Conference (MAC). The Chippewas were led by second-year head coach Butch Jones.

Central Michigan finished the regular season with an 8–4 overall record and 6–2 in conference play, which was good enough for second place in the MAC West. The team received a second straight bid to the Motor City Bowl, where they faced the Florida Atlantic Owls led by head coach Howard Schnellenberger. The two teams were tied throughout the third quarter until the Owls pulled away. Central Michigan quarterback Dan LeFevour led a touchdown drive in the final three minutes, but an onside kick attempt failed, and the Chippewas lost, 24–21.

== Schedule ==
Date	Time	Opponent	Site	TV	Result	Attendance	Source
August 28	7:00 pm	No. 18 (FCS) Eastern Illinois*	Kelly/Shorts Stadium; Mount Pleasant, MI		W 31–12	19,732	
September 6	3:30 pm	at No. 2 Georgia*	Sanford Stadium; Athens, GA	FSN	L 17–56	92,746	
September 13	2:00 pm	at Ohio	Peden Stadium; Athens, OH		W 28–31	18,268	
September 20	12:00 pm	at Purdue*	Ross–Ade Stadium; West Lafayette, IN	BTN	L 25–32	57,101	
September 27	4:00 pm	Buffalo	Kelly/Shorts Stadium; Mount Pleasant, MI		W 27–25	21,032	
October 11	4:00 pm	Temple^{†}	Kelly/Shorts Stadium; Mount Pleasant, MI	ESPN Plus	W 24–14	22,114	
October 18	12:00 pm	Western Michigan	Kelly/Shorts Stadium; Mount Pleasant, MI (rivalry)	ESPN Plus	W 38–28	30,302	
October 25	12:00 pm	at Toledo	Glass Bowl; Toledo, OH	ESPN Plus	W 24–23	21,422	
November 1	12:00 pm	at Indiana*	Memorial Stadium; Bloomington, IN	BTN	W 37–34	26,140	
November 12	8:00 pm	at Northern Illinois	Huskie Stadium; DeKalb, IL	ESPN2	W 33–30 ^{OT}	13,543	
November 19	7:00 pm	No. 14 Ball State	Kelly/Shorts Stadium; Mount Pleasant, MI	ESPN2	L 24–31	20,114	
November 28	12:00 pm	at Eastern Michigan	Rynearson Stadium; Ypsilanti, MI (rivalry)		L 52–56	26,188	
December 26	7:30 pm	vs. Florida Atlantic*	Ford Field; Detroit, MI (Motor City Bowl)	ESPN	L 21–24	41,399	
*Non-conference game; ^{†}Homecoming; Rankings from AP Poll released prior to the game; All times are in Eastern time
