= 2008 Middle Tennessee Blue Raiders football team =

American college football season

2008 Middle Tennessee Blue Raiders football
- Conference: Sun Belt Conference
- Record: 5–7 (3–4 Sun Belt)
- Head coach: Rick Stockstill (3rd season)
- Offensive coordinator: G. A. Mangus (3rd season)
- Offensive scheme: Multiple
- Defensive coordinator: Manny Diaz (3rd season)
- Base defense: 4–3
- Home stadium: Johnny "Red" Floyd Stadium

2008 Sun Belt Conference football standings
	Conf.			Overall
Team	W		L	W		L
Troy $	6	–	1	8	–	5
Louisiana–Lafayette	5	–	2	6	–	6
Florida Atlantic	4	–	3	7	–	6
Arkansas State	4	–	3	6	–	6
FIU	3	–	4	5	–	7
Middle Tennessee	3	–	4	5	–	7
Louisiana–Monroe	3	–	4	4	–	8
North Texas	0	–	7	1	–	11
$ – Conference champion

The 2008 Middle Tennessee Blue Raiders football team represented Middle Tennessee State University as a member of the Sun Belt Conference during the 2008 NCAA Division I FBS football season. Led by third-year head coach Rick Stockstill, the Blue Raiders compiled am overall record of 5–7 with a mark of 3–4 in conference play, placing in a three-way tie for fifth in the Sun Belt. The team played home games at Johnny "Red" Floyd Stadium in Murfreesboro, Tennessee.

In the second game of the season, the Blue Raiders beat just their fourth-ever opponent from a Power Five conference when they upset Maryland, 24–14. The three prior instance all came against Vanderbilt. The following week, Middle Tennessee came within inches of repeating the feat, when a comeback attempt against Kentucky fell just short.

== Schedule ==
Date	Time	Opponent	Site	TV	Result	Attendance
August 28	6:30 pm	Troy	Johnny "Red" Floyd Stadium; Murfreesboro, TN (Battle for the Palladium)	ESPN+	L 17–31	22,307
September 6	6:00 pm	Maryland*	Johnny "Red" Floyd Stadium; Murfreesboro, TN	CSS	W 24–14	22,605
September 13	6:00 pm	at Kentucky*	Commonwealth Stadium; Lexington, KY	GamePlan	L 14–20	68,612
September 20	6:00 pm	at Arkansas State	ASU Stadium; Jonesboro, AR		L 14–31	24,256
September 30	7:00 pm	Florida Atlantic	Johnny "Red" Floyd Stadium; Murfreesboro, TN	ESPN2	W 14–13	25,766
October 11	6:00 pm	at FIU	FIU Stadium; Miami, FL		L 21–31	15,108
October 18	2:30 pm	at Louisville*	Papa John's Cardinal Stadium; Louisville, KY		L 23–42	38,319
October 25	6:00 pm	at Mississippi State*	Davis Wade Stadium; Starkville, MS	ESPNU	L 22–31	40,024
November 8	2:30 pm	Louisiana–Monroe	Johnny "Red" Floyd Stadium; Murfreesboro, TN		W 24–21	16,150
November 15	11:00 am	at Western Kentucky*	Houchens Industries–L. T. Smith Stadium; Bowling Green, KY (rivalry)	CSS	W 21–10	11,817
November 22	2:30 pm	North Texas	Johnny "Red" Floyd Stadium; Murfreesboro, TN		W 52–13	14,307
December 3	6:00 pm	at Louisiana–Lafayette	Cajun Field; Lafayette, LA		L 28–42	15,32
*Non-conference game; All times are in Eastern time

== Game summaries ==
=== Troy ===
	1	2	3	4	Total
Troy	7	10	7	7	31
Middle Tennessee	3	0	0	14	17

Middle Tennessee compiled two rapid-fire fourth-quarter touchdowns, but the comeback attempt ultimately fell short. Troy eventually finished the season as the Sun Belt Conference champions.

=== Maryland ===
	1	2	3	4	Total
Maryland	7	0	7	0	14
Middle Tennessee	7	3	14	0	24

After receiving the kick-off, Middle Tennessee quarterback Joe Craddock led an 80-yard, 10-play drive. It included a fake punt that caught Maryland off-guard and the punter completed a 28-yard pass for the first down conversion. Craddock ended the drive with a 5-yard touchdown pass. On Maryland's second offensive play of the game, Da'Rel Scott broke free for a 63-yard run for a touchdown. In the second quarter, Middle Tennessee re-took the lead with a 31-yard field goal.

In the third quarter, Turner threw an interception which was returned 25 yards to the Maryland five yard-line, and then subsequently ran in for a touchdown. Turner then completed a short toss to Darrius Heyward-Bey who ran it downfield for an 80-yard touchdown. In the fourth quarter, Maryland found itself inside the Middle Tennessee 35-yard line three times, but couldn't capitalize on the opportunities. Middle Tennessee defenders saved two potential touchdowns with interceptions on their own two-yard line and in the endzone.

The game marked Middle Tennessee's first ever win over an ACC opponent, although they had come close in Murfreesboro, TN the year prior, where Virginia made a field goal for the go-ahead with eight seconds remaining. It was Middle Tennessee's fourth ever win against an opponent from a BCS conference. The other three all came against Vanderbilt.

=== Kentucky ===
	1	2	3	4	Total
Middle Tennessee	7	0	7	0	14
Kentucky	7	3	0	10	20

A week after Middle Tennessee beat just their second ever BCS conference opponent, the Blue Raiders came very close to beating a third. In the final seconds of the game, with Middle Tennessee trailing by six points, wide receiver Eldred King caught a 61-yard pass but was ankle-tackled at the Kentucky one-yard line as time expired.

=== Arkansas State ===
	1	2	3	4	Total
Middle Tennessee	0	0	7	7	14
Arkansas State	7	10	7	7	31

Middle Tennessee has dominated the football series against Arkansas State with wins in eight of the first nine meetings; however, the 10th gridiron clash between the teams is one the Blue Raiders would likely prefer to have forgetten. Arkansas State was too much for Middle Tennessee in a 31–14 win on Homecoming at ASU Stadium on Sept. 20, 2008.

The Red Wolves dominated from the outset and took control in the first half on the way to a 17-0 halftime advantage. Middle Tennessee (1-3, 0–2) finally got on the scoreboard late in the third quarter when Phillip Tanner plunged in from the 2 to cap a nine-play, 76-yard drive and narrow the margin to 24–7 with 2:19 remaining in the third quarter. The Blue Raiders fell to 0–2 in conference play as Arkansas State beat the Blue Raiders for the second time in ten tries.

=== Florida Atlantic ===
	1	2	3	4	Total
Florida Atlantic	7	3	0	3	13
Middle Tennessee	0	0	0	14	14

This game was the first ever nationally televised football game from Johnny "Red" Floyd Stadium from the Middle Tennessee State University campus. This game was marketed as a blackout game for the Blue Raiders, and the team wore all black uniforms with blue numbers and shoulder stripes.

Middle Tennessee scored all of its points in the final 5:22 of the game after looking lethargic offensively until that point; however, when the game was on the line the Blue Raiders took full advantage. The Blue Raiders put together a remarkable comeback when quarterback Joe Craddock marched the Blue Raiders 65 yards with no timeouts to rally them to a dramatic 14–13 win against Florida Atlantic in front of 25,766 and an ESPN2 national television audience.

Trailing 13-7 Middle Tennessee began its final drive at its 35-yard line with 1:15 remaining and no timeouts. Craddock completed 4-of-6 passes for 65 yards on the game-winning drive, including the striking 32-yard aerial to freshman wide receiver Malcolm Beyah, who rose above three defenders and secured the ball with no time on the clock for one of the most remarkable finishes in Floyd Stadium history. Beyah, who had two catches for 59 yards on the final drive, tied the game 13–13 with his breathtaking grab and freshman kicker Alan Gendreau, who was frozen twice by consecutive Florida Atlantic timeouts, nailed the extra point to send the remaining Blue Raider faithful into a frenzy as the students stormed the field.

=== FIU ===
	1	2	3	4	Total
Middle Tennessee	3	0	10	8	21
FIU	0	10	14	7	31

Middle Tennessee's hopes of a push toward the Sun Belt Conference championship in the second half of the season took a decisive blow in Miami, FL, when Florida International dealt the Blue Raiders a 31-21 setback at FIU Stadium.

Middle Tennessee never got on track offensively in the opening half and things worsened in the second half when the Golden Panthers finally started gaining yards in chunks against a Blue Raider defense that had been on the field a majority of the first half. Middle Tennessee fell to 2–4 overall and was out of the conference race at 1–3.

As of this game, the series between Middle Tennessee and Florida International is tied 2-2. The home team has never lost in the series.

=== Louisville ===
	1	2	3	4	Total
Middle Tennessee	14	3	0	6	23
Louisville	7	7	7	21	42

Middle Tennessee showed fight against Louisville during a dandy first-half display but the Cardinals flexed their Big East muscle in the second half and pulled away for a 42–23 win in Louisville.

The Blue Raiders led 17-14 after a spirited first half but the second half belonged to Louisville as it made a statement and pulled away from Middle Tennessee's upset bid.

The game started well enough for the Blue Raiders who jumped out to the early lead and maintained it throughout the first half. Louisville quarterback Hunter Cantwell had a pass intercepted by Blue Raider safety Jeremy Kellem, who returned 14 yards for the touchdown to give Middle Tennessee a 7–0 lead, with 9:27 remaining in the opening frame. Minutes later, Blue Raider receiver Patrick Honeycutt took the handoff from quarterback Joe Craddock and pulled up for a pass to a wide open tailback Phillip Tanner, who caught the ball at the 18 and went 39 yards for the touchdown to give the Blue Raiders a 14–0 lead with 6:46 remaining in the opening quarter. The tide turned somewhat in the second quarter, particularly when Louisville running back Victor Anderson sprinted 88 yards to tie the game, 14-14, with 12:10 remaining in the first half. Louisville went on to win 42–23.

=== Mississippi State ===
	1	2	3	4	Total
Middle Tennessee	3	10	3	6	22
Mississippi State	14	0	10	7	31

Middle Tennessee's offense put together five scoring drives and Eldred King turned in one of the best performances ever by a Blue Raider receiver but it wasn't enough in a tough 31-22 setback to Mississippi State at Davis Wade Stadium.

The Blue Raiders stood toe-to-toe with the Bulldogs in the first half and trailed 14–13 at the break before taking their first lead on the opening drive of the second half. Mississippi State was too strong on two pivotal second half drives as Middle Tennessee's strong road showing wasn't enough to warrant an upset. This game marked the third straight loss for the Blue Raiders

Mississippi State will travel to Murfreesboro, TN, to take on the Blue Raiders during the 2009 season. This will be 3rd BCS opponent to play at Middle Tennessee in three years, and the first time that a Southeastern Conference (SEC) opponent will play in Johnny "Red" Floyd Stadium.

=== Louisiana–Monroe ===
	1	2	3	4	Total
Louisiana Monroe	0	7	7	7	21
Middle Tennessee	14	3	0	7	24

After three straight road games, and three straight loses, Middle Tennessee returned home to take on conference foe Louisiana-Monroe Warhawks.

Football players at Middle Tennessee made sure the students and alumni enjoyed Homecoming as the Blue Raiders raced out to a fast start and held on for a 24–21 win against ULM at Floyd Stadium.

The Blue Raiders jumped out to a 17–0 lead early in the second quarter. After ULM had pulled to within 17-14 late in the third, Middle Tennessee built its lead back to 10 and secured the Homecoming win to improve to 3–6 overall and 2–3 in the Sun Belt Conference.

Middle Tennessee improved to 47-19-2 on Homecoming, including 2-1 under head coach, Rick Stockstill. The Blue Raiders have won 18 of their past 21 Homecoming games.

=== Western Kentucky ===
	1	2	3	4	Total
Middle Tennessee	7	7	0	7	21
Western Kentucky	0	3	0	7	10

Middle Tennessee put itself back in strong position to become bowl eligible following an impressive 21–10 win against hated rival Western Kentucky, on a cold rainy/snowy day in Bowling Green, KY.

Senior quarterback Joe Craddock completed 19-of-29 passes for 212 yards and threw two touchdowns with no interceptions to key a 212-yard passing attack; however, it was great balance and play-calling that kept WKU on its heels. The Blue Raiders ran for 101 yards and rode the strong back of junior running back Phillip Tanner in a smash-mouth type approach. Tanner responded with a season-high 92 yards that included a 29-yard touchdown. Middle Tennessee's offense finished with 313 total yards.

Western Kentucky will become bowl-eligible and will be able to contend for a conference championship for the 2009 season. Because of this Middle Tennessee finished their season with an out of conference record of 2–3.

=== North Texas ===
	1	2	3	4	Total
North Texas	13	0	0	0	13
Middle Tennessee	17	28	7	0	52

Middle Tennessee's ground attack enjoyed the breakout game it had been seeking and junior tailback Phillip Tanner and a dominating offensive line were the major contributors as the Blue Raiders routed North Texas, 52–13, in the home finale at Floyd Stadium Saturday. The Blue Raiders won their third straight to improve to 5–6 overall, 3-3 in the SBC, and kept alive their hopes of becoming bowl eligible.

Tanner enjoyed one of the most productive games of any Blue Raider ever and he had the greatest offensive outburst in SBC history with six touchdowns - five rushing - and 159 yards on 14 carries. A Texas native, Tanner ran roughshod through the Mean Green defense, generally breaking tackles and running over defenders on his way to touchdowns of 12, 1, 19, 66, 36 and 92 yards. The first five touchdowns were rushing scores and Tanner capped the outlandish scoring day with a 92-yard kickoff return to start the second half. Tanner finished with 301 all-purpose yards, the third-highest total in program history.

Middle Tennessee's 52 points scored are the most ever under Rick Stockstill and the most by the Blue Raiders since they had 70 against Idaho in 2001. Middle Tennessee and North Texas entered play tied for the most league wins in Sun Belt Conference history with 30. The Blue Raiders broke the tie with the victory over the Mean Green to move their count to 31.

=== Louisiana–Lafayette ===
	1	2	3	4	Total
Middle Tennessee	7	7	7	7	28
Louisiana-Lafayette	14	7	7	14	42

Middle Tennessee's strong second half run finally was derailed when Louisiana-Lafayette fought off the Blue Raiders, 42–28, at Cajun Field to end their three-game win streak.

The game featured two teams seeking to gain bowl eligibility and it was indicative from the outset as the teams battled back and forth in an effort to keep their season alive. Middle Tennessee (5-7, 3–4) had pulled to within one game of becoming bowl eligible with an impressive three-game win streak that preceded the setback to Louisiana-Lafayette (6-6, 5–2).

Senior quarterback Joe Craddock was outstanding in his final game as a Blue Raider. Craddock completed 22-of-28 passes for 242 yards and two touchdowns. He became the only quarterback in school history to have 10 games with more than 200 yards passing in a single season. Craddock also tied for fifth on the single-season touchdown list with 14.
