= 2008 Motor City Bowl =

Florida Atlantic Owls	Central Michigan Chippewas
(6–6)	(8–4)
Sun Belt	MAC
24	21
Head coach: Howard Schnellenberger	Head coach: Butch Jones
	1	2	3	4	Total
Florida Atlantic	7	3	7	7	24
Central Michigan	0	10	3	8	21
- Date: December 26, 2008
- Season: 2008
- Stadium: Ford Field
- Location: Detroit, Michigan
- MVP: QB Rusty Smith, FAU
- Favorite: CMU by 7
- Referee: Tom Walker (Big 12)
- Attendance: 41,399
- Payout: US$750,000

United States TV coverage
- Network: ESPN
- Announcers: Todd Harris, Ray Bentley
- Nielsen ratings: 2.1

The 2008 Motor City Bowl was a National Collegiate Athletic Association bowl game in which the Florida Atlantic Owls defeated the Central Michigan Chippewas 24–21. It was played on December 26, 2008, at Ford Field in Detroit, Michigan and aired on ESPN. The underdog FAU team from the Sun Belt Conference was led by game Most Valuable Player Rusty Smith. CMU had finished in third place in the West Division of the Mid-American Conference.

The game was the 12th installment of the Motor City Bowl and was attended by 41,399 people, the fourth-lowest all time for the Motor City Bowl.

== Scoring summary ==
Scoring play	Score
1st Quarter
FAU – DiIvory Edgecomb 1-yard TD run (Ross Gornall kick), 7:37	FAU 7–0
2nd Quarter
CMU – Kito Poblah 5-yard TD pass from Dan LeFevour (Andrew Aguila kick), 13:30	Tie 7–7
CMU – Aguila 35-yard FG, 9:30	CMU 10–7
FAU – Gornall 36-yard FG, :47	Tie 10–10
3rd Quarter
FAU – Chris Bonner 52-yard TD pass from Rusty Smith (Gornall kick), 7:57	FAU 17–10
CMU – Aguila 33-yard FG, 4:59	FAU 17–13
4th Quarter
FAU – Cortez Gent 18-yard TD pass from Smith (Gornall kick), 10:17	FAU 24–13
CMU – Antonio Brown 15-yard TD pass from LeFevour (Poblah pass from LeFevour), 3:09	FAU 24–21
