= 2008 FIU Golden Panthers football team =

American college football season

2008 FIU Golden Panthers football
- Conference: Sun Belt Conference
- Record: 5–7 (3–4 Sun Belt)
- Head coach: Mario Cristobal (2nd season)
- Offensive coordinator: Bill Legg (1st season)
- Offensive scheme: Spread
- Defensive coordinator: Phil Galiano (2nd season)
- Base defense: 4–3
- Home stadium: FIU Stadium

2008 Sun Belt Conference football standings
	Conf.			Overall
Team	W		L	W		L
Troy $	6	–	1	8	–	5
Louisiana–Lafayette	5	–	2	6	–	6
Florida Atlantic	4	–	3	7	–	6
Arkansas State	4	–	3	6	–	6
FIU	3	–	4	5	–	7
Middle Tennessee	3	–	4	5	–	7
Louisiana–Monroe	3	–	4	4	–	8
North Texas	0	–	7	1	–	11
$ – Conference champion

The 2008 FIU Golden Panthers football team represented Florida International University (FIU) as a member of the Sun Belt Conference during the 2008 NCAA Division I FBS football season. Led by second-year head coach Mario Cristobal, the Panthers compiled an overall record of 5–7 with a mark of 3–4 in conference play, placing in a three-way tie for fifth in the Sun Belt. The team played home game at FIU Stadium in Miami.

The season started off with a loss at 13th-ranked Kansas, 40–10. Following that, Iowa routed FIU, 42–0. FIU then faced its highest-ranked opponent in school history, 12th-ranked South Florida, for the inaugural game of the renovated FIU Stadium. Trailing 17–0 with 2:30 left in the game FIU scored a safety and a touchdown. The Golden Panthers lost, 17–9, but played acted as a spoiler for South Florida, with the latter falling three spots in the rankings. The game against Toledo became their first-ever out-of-conference FBS win. Against, Toledo, FIU forced four turnovers and recorded its first road win since 2005. It was also the program first non-conference win against an NCAA Division I Football Bowl Subdivision (FBS) opponent.

== Schedule ==
Date	Time	Opponent	Site	TV	Result	Attendance
August 30	7:00 p.m.	at No. 14 Kansas*	Memorial Stadium; Lawrence, KS		L 10–40	52,112
September 6	12:00 p.m.	at Iowa*	Kinnick Stadium; Iowa City, IA	BTN	L 0–42	70,585
September 20	5:00 p.m.	No. 12 South Florida*	FIU Stadium; Miami, FL	ESPNU	L 9–17	16,717
September 27	7:00 p.m.	at Toledo*	Glass Bowl; Toledo, OH	BCSN	W 35–16	19,004
October 4	7:00 p.m.	at North Texas	Fouts Field; Denton, TX	ESPN Plus	W 42–10	16,781
October 11	7:00 p.m.	Middle Tennessee	FIU Stadium; Miami, FL		W 31–21	15,108
October 18	7:00 p.m.	at Troy	Movie Gallery Stadium; Troy, AL	ESPN Plus	L 23–33	19,316
November 1	5:00 p.m.	at Louisiana–Lafayette	Cajun Field; Lafayette, LA		L 20–49	29,031
November 8	7:00 p.m.	Arkansas State^{†}	FIU Stadium; Miami, FL		W 22–21	15,106
November 22	7:00 p.m.	Louisiana–Monroe	FIU Stadium; Miami, FL		L 27–31	12,925
November 29	4:00 p.m.	at FAU	Dolphin Stadium; Miami Gardens, FL (Shula Bowl)		L 50–57 ^{OT}	16,781
December 6	7:00 p.m.	Western Kentucky*	FIU Stadium; Miami, FL		W 27–3	9,405
*Non-conference game; ^{†}Homecoming; Rankings from AP Poll released prior to the game; All times are in Eastern time

== Game summaries ==
=== at Kansas ===
	1	2	3	4	Total
FIU	0	10	0	0	10
Kansas	7	23	10	0	40

=== at Iowa ===
	1	2	3	4	Total
FIU	0	0	0	0	0
Iowa	21	14	0	7	42

=== South Florida ===
	1	2	3	4	Total
South Florida	7	3	0	7	17
FIU	0	0	0	9	9

=== Toledo ===
	1	2	3	4	Total
FIU	0	14	21	0	35
Toledo	13	3	0	0	16

=== North Texas ===
	1	2	3	4	Total
FIU	14	14	7	7	42
North Texas	0	0	3	7	10

=== Middle Tennessee ===
	1	2	3	4	Total
Middle Tennessee	3	0	10	8	21
FIU	0	10	14	7	31

=== Troy ===
	1	2	3	4	Total
FIU	9	7	0	7	23
Troy	16	3	7	7	33

=== Louisiana–Lafayette ===
	1	2	3	4	Total
FIU	14	0	0	6	20
Louisiana–Lafayette	7	28	14	0	49

=== Arkansas State ===
	1	2	3	4	Total
Arkansas State	0	7	7	7	21
FIU	0	6	6	10	22

=== Louisiana–Monroe ===
	1	2	3	4	Total
Louisiana–Monroe	0	21	10	0	31
FIU	3	0	14	10	27

=== Florida Atlantic ===
Shula Bowl

	1	2	3	4	OT	Total
FIU	7	9	6	28	0	50
Florida Atlantic	14	0	8	28	7	57

=== Western Kentucky ===
	1	2	3	4	Total
Western Kentucky	3	0	0	0	3
FIU	0	7	6	14	27

== Coaching staff ==
Name	Current Title	Years at FIU	Alma mater
Mario Cristobal	Head Coach	2006 –	Miami
Bill Legg	Offensive Coordinator; Quarterbacks	2008 –	West Virginia
Phil Galiano	Defensive Coordinator; Linebackers	2007 –	Shippensburg
Apollo Wright	Special teams Coordinator	2001 –	Wagner College
Mike Cassano	Assistant Head Coach; Running backs/Recruiting	2006 –	New Hampshire
Bernard Clark	Assistant Head Coach; Defensive line	2004–2005, 2007 –	Miami
Greg Laffere	Assistant Head Coach; Offensive line	2005 –	Miami
Alex Mirabal	Assistant Head Coach; Tight ends	2006 –	FIU
Frank Ponce	Assistant Head Coach; Wide receivers	2005 –	FIU
Jeff Popovich	Assistant Head Coach; Secondary	2006 –	Miami
Roderick Moore	Strength & Conditioning Coach	–	-
Chris Siegle	Graduate Assistant Coach	2005 –	-
Dennis Smith	Graduate Assistant Coach	2006 –	Miami
