= 2008 New Orleans Bowl =

2008 R+L Carriers New Orleans Bowl
Southern Miss Golden Eagles	Troy Trojans
(6–6)	(8–4)
C-USA	Sun Belt
30	27
Head coach: Larry Fedora	Head coach: Larry Blakeney
	1	2	3	4	OT	Total
Southern Miss	7	10	0	10	3	30
Troy	14	3	10	0	0	27
- Date: December 21, 2008
- Season: 2008
- Stadium: Louisiana Superdome
- Location: New Orleans, Louisiana
- MVP: QB Austin Davis, Southern Miss
- Referee: Larry Farina (Pac-10)
- Attendance: 30,197
- Payout: US$325,000

United States TV coverage
- Network: ESPN
- Announcers: Eric Collins, Shaun King
- Nielsen ratings: 0.7

The 2008 R+L Carriers New Orleans Bowl was the eighth edition of the college football bowl game, played at the Louisiana Superdome in New Orleans, Louisiana. The Southern Miss Golden Eagles defeated the Troy Trojans, 30–27 in a dramatic overtime game. Troy had qualified for the game by winning the Sun Belt Conference title, while Southern Miss had roared back from a 2–6 start to fill the game’s slot from Conference USA.

Kickoff time was 7:15 p.m. U.S. Central time and the game was shown live on ESPN.

== Game summary ==
Southern Miss was designated as the away team; however, instead of wearing the visitor white jerseys, the Golden Eagles started the game in yellow home jerseys (Troy wore its maroon home jerseys). Due to NCAA rules, Southern Miss was penalized one time out after the opening kickoff and played the first half with two timeouts to Troy’s three.

Southern Miss came from ten points down in the fourth quarter to force overtime and, after a Britt Barefoot 39-yard field goal on the Golden Eagles’ possession, Michael McGhee blocked Troy kicker Sam Glusman’s 28-yard field goal attempt that would have tied the game. The block sealed the win for Southern Miss, ensuring the school’s fifteenth consecutive winning season.

== Other notes ==
- Barefoot made all three of his field goal attempts, from 38, 46 and 39 yards. Prior to this, his longest field goal of the season had been 29 yards.
- Southern Miss head coach Larry Fedora's decision to wear home uniforms when the team was not supposed to do so was not the only such maneuver this season. On December 6, Southern California head coach Pete Carroll had the Trojans wear red uniforms instead of white in the annual rivalry game against UCLA. The same penalty was incurred against USC.
- Southern Miss received an extra allotment of tickets from the New Orleans Bowl committee after selling out all of the seats it had previously received.
- Golden Eagles wide receiver DeAndre Brown spent Sunday overnight at a local hospital after literally snapping his leg in half in the first quarter.
- The audio of the ESPN telecast was also available on ESPN Radio through a simulcast.

=== Scoring summary ===
Scoring Play	Score
1st Quarter
Troy – Jorrick Calvin 17 yard fumble return (Sam Glusman kick), 14:10	Troy 7–0
USM – Gerald Baptiste 64 yard TD pass from Austin Davis (Britt Barefoot kick), 13:22	Tie 7–7
Troy – Kennard Burton 4 yard TD pass from Levi Brown (Glusman kick), 2:58	Troy 14–7
2nd Quarter
USM – Damion Fletcher 8 yard TD run (Barefoot kick), 14:25	Tie 14–14
Troy – Glusman 20 yard FG, 3:03	Troy 17–14
USM – Barefoot 38 yard FG, :00	Tie 17–17
3rd Quarter
Troy – Glusman 34 yard FG, 4:34	Troy 20–17
Troy – Jerrel Jernigan 6 yard TD run (Glusman kick), 2:01	Troy 27–17
4th Quarter
USM – Jonathan Massey 35 yard TD pass from Davis (Barefoot kick), 7:20	Troy 27–24
USM – Barefoot 46 yard FG, 2:50	Tie 27–27
Overtime
USM – Barefoot 39 yard FG	USM 30–27
