= Willie Rose =

American football player (born 1987)

Profile
- Position: Fullback

Personal information
- Born: March 23, 1987 (age 39); Tampa, Florida
- Listed height: 6 ft 1 in (1.85 m)
- Listed weight: 236 lb (107 kg)

Career information
- College: Florida Atlantic
- NFL draft: 2010

Career history
- Tennessee Titans (2010)*
- * Offseason or practice squad member only

William Rose (born March 23, 1987) is an American former football fullback. He was an undrafted rookie free agent signed by the Titans. He played college football at Florida Atlantic.

== College career ==
Rose spent three years as a starter at Florida Atlantic with a strong senior season, rushing for 307 yards on 62 carries while adding 29 catches for 302 yards. Widely considered the most dominant fullback in the Sun Belt Conference, he averaged 5.0 yards per carry and 6.9 per reception. Rose had a strong performance against then-No. 24 Nebraska on Sept. 5, 2009, with three receptions for 59 yards - the second-highest total of his career.

== Professional career ==
Rose was an undrafted rookie free agent signed by the Tennessee Titans following the 2010 NFL draft. However, he was waived due to a back injury before the season.
