= 2008 Florida Atlantic Owls football team =

American college football season

2008 Florida Atlantic Owls football

Motor City Bowl champion

Motor City Bowl, W 24–21 vs. Central Michigan
- Conference: Sun Belt Conference
- Record: 7–6 (4–3 Sun Belt)
- Head coach: Howard Schnellenberger (8th season)
- Offensive coordinator: Gary Nord (4th season)
- Offensive scheme: Pro-style
- Defensive coordinator: Kirk Hoza (8th season)
- Base defense: 4–3
- Home stadium: Lockhart Stadium; Dolphin Stadium

2008 Sun Belt Conference football standings
	Conf.			Overall
Team	W		L	W		L
Troy $	6	–	1	8	–	5
Louisiana–Lafayette	5	–	2	6	–	6
Florida Atlantic	4	–	3	7	–	6
Arkansas State	4	–	3	6	–	6
FIU	3	–	4	5	–	7
Middle Tennessee	3	–	4	5	–	7
Louisiana–Monroe	3	–	4	4	–	8
North Texas	0	–	7	1	–	11
$ – Conference champion

The 2008 Florida Atlantic Owls football team represented Florida Atlantic University (FAU) as a member of the Sun Belt Conference during the 2008 NCAA Division I FBS football season. Led by eighth-year head coach Howard Schnellenberger, the Owls compiled an overall record of 7–6 with a mark of 4–3 in conference play, tying for third place in the Sun Belt. Florida Atlantic was invited to the Motor City Bowl, where the Owls defeated Central Michigan. The team played home games at Lockhart Stadium in Fort Lauderdale, Florida and Dolphin Stadium in Miami Gardens, Florida.

== Schedule ==
Date	Time	Opponent	Site	TV	Result	Attendance
August 30	7:00 p.m.	at No. 10 Texas*	Darrell K Royal–Texas Memorial Stadium; Austin, TX	PPV	L 10–52	98,053
September 6	4:00 p.m.	UAB*	Lockhart Stadium; Fort Lauderdale, FL		W 49–34	15,143
September 13	12:00 p.m.	at Michigan State*	Spartan Stadium; East Lansing, MI	ESPN2	L 0–17	70,321
September 20	12:00 p.m.	at Minnesota*	Hubert H. Humphrey Metrodome; Minneapolis, MN	BTN	L 3–37	41,003
September 30	8:00 p.m.	at Middle Tennessee	Johnny "Red" Floyd Stadium; Murfreesboro, TN	ESPN2	L 13–14	25,766
October 7	8:00 p.m.	Troy	Lockhart Stadium; Fort Lauderdale, FL	ESPN2	L 17–30	17,191
October 18	7:00 p.m.	at Western Kentucky*	Houchens Industries–L. T. Smith Stadium; Bowling Green, KY		W 24–20	14,171
October 25	7:00 p.m.	at Louisiana–Monroe	Malone Stadium; Monroe, LA	CSS	W 29–28	9,922
November 8	4:00 p.m.	North Texas	Lockhart Stadium; Fort Lauderdale, FL		W 46–13	17,715
November 15	4:00 p.m.	Louisiana–Lafayette	Lockhart Stadium; Fort Lauderdale, FL		W 40–29	14,338
November 22	3:00 p.m.	at Arkansas State	ASU Stadium; Jonesboro, AR	CSS	L 14–28	10,845
November 29	4:00 p.m.	FIU	Dolphin Stadium; Miami Gardens, FL (Shula Bowl)		W 57–50 ^{OT}	16,781
December 26	7:30 p.m.	vs. Central Michigan*	Ford Field; Detroit, MI (Motor City Bowl)	ESPN	W 24–21	41,399
*Non-conference game; Rankings from AP Poll released prior to the game; All times are in Eastern time

== Preseason ==
The Florida Atlantic Owls entered the 2008 season defending as defending Sun Belt c-champions. Rusty Smith, a junior, returned at quarterback. The 2008 team also returned an overwhelming majority of starters from the conference champion team, as it only lost four seniors (DB Kris Bartels, OL Jarrid Smith, LB Cergile Sincere, DL Josh Pinnick).

In the preseason Sun Belt coaches poll, the Owls were a clear favorite to repeat as champions. Florida Atlantic received 62 total points and 6 first-place votes.

=== Preseason honors ===
==== Preseason Sun Belt Players of the Year ====
- Sun Belt Conference Player of the Year, Offense: Rusty Smith (QB, Jr.)
- Sun Belt Conference Player of the Year, Defense: Frantz Joseph (LB, Sr.)

==== Preseason All-Sun Belt honors ====
- Rusty Smith (QB, Jr.)
- Cortez Gent (WR, Jr.)
- Nick Paris (OL, Sr.)
- Jervonte Jackson (DL, Sr.)
- Robert St. Clair (DL, Sr.)
- Frantz Joseph (LB, Sr.)
- Tavious Polo (CB, So.)
- Corey Small (CB, Sr.)

== Awards and honors ==
- Week 12 Sun Belt Conference Player of the Week, Offense: Rusty Smith (QB, Jr.)
- Week 12 Sun Belt Conference Player of the Week, Defense: Corey Small (CB, Sr.)
- Week 14 Sun Belt Conference Player of the Week, Offense: Rusty Smith (QB, Jr.)
- Week 14 Sun Belt Conference Player of the Week, Defense: Frantz Joseph (LB, Sr.)
- 2008 Shula Bowl Most Valuable Player: Rusty Smith (QB, Jr.)

=== All-Sun Belt honors ===
- First Team All-Sun Belt Conference:
  - Jervonte Jackson (DL, Sr.)
  - Frantz Joseph (LB, Sr.)
  - Corey Small (CB, Sr.)
- Second Team All-Sun Belt Conference:
  - Jamari Grant (TE, Jr.)
  - John Rizzo (OL, Sr.)
  - Nick Paris (OL, Sr.)
  - Charles Pierre (RB, Sr.)

== New program records ==
Florida Atlantic players broke numerous program records during the 2008 season.

Statistic	Previous record	New record
Passing touchdowns in a career)	Jared Allen (40 in 2001–2004)	Rusty Smith (60 in 2006–2008)
Rushing yards in a career	Doug Parker (1,981 in 2001–2005)	Charles Pierre (3,015 in 2005–2008)
Rushing yards in a season	Doug Parker (896 in 2004)	Charles Pierre (1,014)
Rushing touchdowns in career	Doug Parker (21 in 2001–2005)	Charles Pierre (23 in 2005–2008)
Receiving touchdowns in a career	Anthony Crissinger-Hill (14 in 2001–2004)	Cortez Gent (17 in 2006–2008)
Total tackles in a career	Chris Laskowski (294 in 2001–2004)	Frantz Joseph (333 in 2006–2008)
Total tackles in a season	Frantz Joseph (131 in 2007)	Frantz Joseph (141)
