= Jason Chery =

American football player (born 1985)

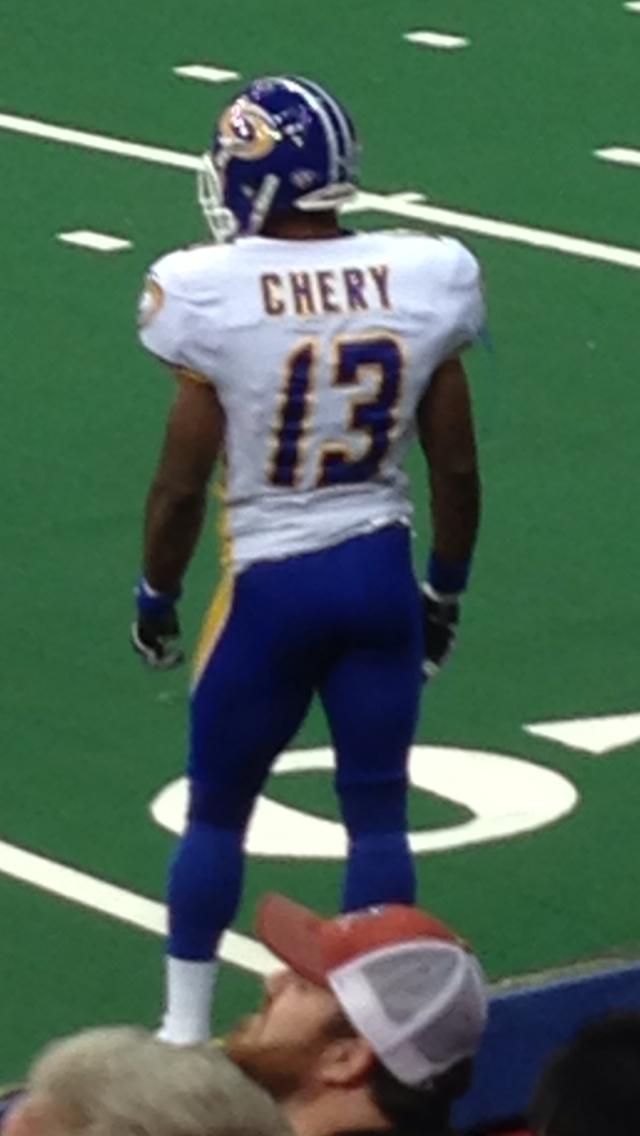
- Chery with the Storm in 2013

No. 13
- Position: Wide receiver

Personal information
- Born: May 31, 1985 (age 41); Boynton Beach, Florida, U.S.
- Listed height: 5 ft 10 in (1.78 m)
- Listed weight: 185 lb (84 kg)

Career information
- High school: Spanish River Community (FL)
- College: Louisiana-Lafayette
- NFL draft: 2009: undrafted

Career history
- Carolina Panthers (2009)*; Pittsburgh Steelers (2009–2010)*; Green Bay Packers (2010)*; Hartford Colonials (2010–2011); Saskatchewan Roughriders (2012)*; Tampa Bay Storm (2013)
- * Offseason or practice squad member only

Awards and highlights
- Second-team All-Sun Belt (2008)

Career AFL statistics
- Receptions: 21
- Receiving yards: 261
- Receiving touchdowns: 5
- Stats at ArenaFan.com
- Stats at CFL.ca (archive)

Jason Leon Chery (born May 31, 1985) is an American former football wide receiver in the Arena Football League for the Tampa Bay Storm. He was also a member of the Carolina Panthers and Pittsburgh Steelers in the National Football League. He played college football at the University of Louisiana at Lafayette.

== Early life ==
Chery was born in Boynton Beach and moved to Haiti as a child, returning to Delray Beach when he was 9 years old. He attended Spanish River Community High School.

He lettered in football, track and wrestling. As a junior, he registered 1,375 rushing yards and 14 rushing touchdowns. As a senior, he rushed for 1,789 yards and 28 touchdowns. In track, he was a three-time district champion.

== College career ==
Chery accepted a football scholarship from the University of Louisiana at Lafayette. As a freshman, he opted to switch from running back to wide receiver instead of being redshirted. He appeared in 11 games as a backup wide receiver. He tallied 7 receptions for 54 yards, 8 kickoff returns for a 17.9-yard average, 15 special teams tackles and one fumble recovery.

As a sophomore, he appeared in 12 games, starting the first 11 at wide receiver, while making 16 receptions for 222 and 2 receiving touchdowns. He did not start the season finale against the University of Louisiana at Monroe to allow injured offensive tackle Brandon Cox to start in the slot and break the school record with 46 consecutive starts. He was second on the team in receptions and receiving yards, tied for the team lead with two receiving touchdowns. He posted 5 kickoff returns, 12 special teams tackles and 2 blocked punts. He had 5 receptions for 93 yards and 2 touchdowns against Eastern Michigan University. He was named Sun Belt Conference Special Teams Player of the Week against North Carolina A&T State University, after blocking a punt that was returned for a touchdown.

As a junior, he appeared in 12 games, starting the last 11 at wide receiver. He registered 36 receptions (led the team) for 442 yards (second on the team), 2 receiving touchdowns, 21 rushes for 209 yards, 2 rushing touchdowns, 14 kickoff returns for 270 yards (19.3-yard avg.) and 15 special teams tackles. He led the team in receptions, with 36 for 442 yards. He had 101 receiving yards against Arizona State University. He made 7 receptions for 107 yards against the University of Louisiana at Monroe. He was named Sun Belt Conference Special Teams Player of the Week against the University of South Carolina, after making every solo tackle on special teams in the game, including three tackles on kickoff coverage and one on punt coverage, helping to hold the Gamecocks to less than 20 yards per kickoff return.

As a senior, he led the team with 46 receptions for 656 yards and 7 receiving touchdowns. He also had 25 carries for 312 yards and 3 rushing touchdowns.

He finished his college career with 3,518 all-purpose yards (third in school history), 105 receptions for 1,374 yards, 11 receiving touchdowns, 46 carries for 521 yards, 5 rushing touchdowns, 80 kickoff returns for 1,607 yards, one touchdown return, 2 blocked punts, 2 forced fumbles and one fumble recovery. He led the team in special teams tackles in each of his four years, compiling a total of 60.

== Professional career ==
=== Carolina Panthers ===
Chery was signed by the Carolina Panthers as an undrafted free agent after the 2009 NFL draft on May 1. He was waived on September 5 and re-signed to the practice squad the following day. He was cut on October 12.

=== Pittsburgh Steelers ===
On December 23, 2009, he was signed to the Pittsburgh Steelers' practice squad. He was re-signed on January 6, 2010. He was released on June 15.

=== Green Bay Packers ===
On August 5, 2010, he signed as a free agent with the Green Bay Packers. He was released on September 4, before the start of the regular season.

=== Hartford Colonials ===
In 2010, he signed with the Hartford Colonials of the United Football League. He was a backup wide receiver, making 8 receptions for 182 yards and one touchdown.

=== Saskatchewan Roughriders ===
On January 31, 2012, he signed with the Saskatchewan Roughriders of the Canadian Football League. He was released during training camp on June 17.

=== Tampa Bay Storm ===
On November 11, 2012, he was signed as a free agent by the Tampa Bay Storm of the Arena Football League. He registered 21 receptions for 261 yards and 5 touchdowns.

== Personal life ==
Chery is of Haitian descent. His sister Jennifer was a Sun Belt Conference track medalist. After football, he made an attempt to turn pro in Mixed Martial Arts.
