= 2008 North Texas Mean Green football team =

American college football season

2008 North Texas Mean Green football
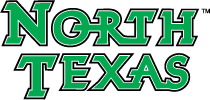
- Conference: Sun Belt Conference
- Record: 1–11 (0–7 Sun Belt)
- Head coach: Todd Dodge (2nd season)
- Offensive coordinator: Todd Ford (2nd season)
- Offensive scheme: Spread option
- Defensive coordinator: Gary DeLoach (4th season)
- Base defense: 4–3
- Home stadium: Fouts Field

2008 Sun Belt Conference football standings
	Conf.			Overall
Team	W		L	W		L
Troy $	6	–	1	8	–	5
Louisiana–Lafayette	5	–	2	6	–	6
Florida Atlantic	4	–	3	7	–	6
Arkansas State	4	–	3	6	–	6
FIU	3	–	4	5	–	7
Middle Tennessee	3	–	4	5	–	7
Louisiana–Monroe	3	–	4	4	–	8
North Texas	0	–	7	1	–	11
$ – Conference champion

The 2008 North Texas Mean Green football team represented the University of North Texas as a member of the Sun Belt Conference during the 2008 NCAA Division I FBS football season. Led second-year head coach, the Mean Green compiled an overall record of 1–11 with a mark 0–7 in conference play, placing last out of eight teams in the Sun Belt. The team played home games at the Fouts Field in Denton, Texas.

Gary DeLoach was hired in the off-season as the new defensive coordinator, replacing Ron Mendoza.

== Schedule ==
Date	Time	Opponent	Site	TV	Result	Attendance	Source
August 30	6:05 p.m.	at Kansas State*	Bill Snyder Family Football Stadium; Manhattan, KS		L 6–45	45,150	
September 6	6:00 p.m.	Tulsa*	Fouts Field; Denton, TX	KTXA 21	L 26–56	22,785	
September 13	7:00 p.m.	at No. 7 LSU*	Tiger Stadium; Baton Rouge, LA	GamePlan	L 3–41	91,602	
September 27	4:00 p.m.	at Rice*	Rice Stadium; Houston, TX	KTXA 21	L 20-77	16,885	
October 4	6:00 p.m.	FIU	Fouts Field; Denton, TX	ESPN Plus	L 10–42	16,781	
October 11	6:00 p.m.	Louisiana–Lafayette	Fouts Field; Denton, TX		L 30–59	17,106	
October 18	6:00 p.m.	at Louisiana–Monroe	Malone Stadium; Monroe, LA		L 23–35	10,388	
October 25	6:00 p.m.	Troy^{†}	Fouts Field; Denton, TX		L 17–45	18,345	
November 1	3:30 p.m.	at Western Kentucky*	Houchens Industries–L. T. Smith Stadium; Bowling Green, KY	ESPN Plus	W 51–40	18,879	
November 8	3:00 p.m.	Florida Atlantic	Lockhart Stadium; Fort Lauderdale, FL		L 13–46	17,175	
November 22	2:30 p.m.	at Middle Tennessee	Johnny "Red" Floyd Stadium; Murfreesboro, TN		L 13–52	14,307	
November 29	1:00 p.m.	Arkansas State	Fouts Field; Denton, TX		L 28–33	9,761	
*Non-conference game; ^{†}Homecoming; Rankings from AP Poll released prior to the game; All times are in Central time

== Game summaries ==
=== Kansas State ===
	1	2	3	4	Total
North Texas	0	0	6	0	6
Kansas State	14	14	14	3	45

Kansas State overpowered North Texas on both sides of the ball, scoring on six of its first seven possessions to take a 42–0 lead, holding the Mean Green to 205 total yards—81 in the first half. Kansas State quarterback Josh Freeman threw for three touchdowns and rushed for another two. Quarterback Giovanni Vizza completed 16 of 29 passes for 100 yards, including the Mean Green's only touchdown of the game, a 9-yard pass to Alex Lott late in the third quarter.

=== Tulsa ===
	1	2	3	4	Total
Tulsa	14	28	7	7	56
North Texas	7	3	3	13	26

=== LSU ===
	1	2	3	4	Total
North Texas	0	3	0	0	3
LSU	10	17	14	0	41

=== Rice ===
	1	2	3	4	Total
North Texas	13	7	0	0	20
Rice	21	35	21	0	77

This game was just the second meeting between the teams. The first was in 1988 when North Texas defeated Rice, 33–17, in Houston.

=== FIU ===
	1	2	3	4	Total
FIU	14	14	7	7	42
North Texas	0	0	3	7	10

=== Louisiana–Lafayette ===
	1	2	3	4	Total
Louisiana–Lafayette	14	21	10	14	59
North Texas	10	10	7	3	30

=== Louisiana–Monroe ===
	1	2	3	4	Total
North Texas	0	6	3	14	23
Louisiana–Monroe	21	14	0	0	35

=== Troy ===
	1	2	3	4	Total
Troy	15	10	7	13	45
North Texas	0	7	0	10	17

=== Western Kentucky ===
	1	2	3	4	Total
North Texas	21	3	7	20	51
Western Kentucky	14	0	20	6	40

=== Florida Atlantic ===
	1	2	3	4	Total
North Texas	0	6	0	7	13
Florida Atlantic	6	19	21	0	46

=== Middle Tennessee ===
	1	2	3	4	Total
North Texas	13	0	0	0	13
Middle Tennessee	17	28	7	0	52

=== Arkansas State ===
	1	2	3	4	Total
Arkansas State	7	10	13	3	33
North Texas	0	14	14	0	28
