= 2008 Troy Trojans football team =

American college football season

2008 Troy Trojans football

Sun Belt champion

New Orleans Bowl, L 27–30 ^{OT} vs. Southern Miss
- Conference: Sun Belt Conference
- Record: 8–5 (6–1 Sun Belt)
- Head coach: Larry Blakeney (18th season)
- Offensive coordinator: Neal Brown (1st season)
- Offensive scheme: Air Raid
- Defensive coordinator: Jeremy Rowell (3rd season)
- Base defense: 4–2–5
- Home stadium: Movie Gallery Stadium (Capacity: 30,000)

2008 Sun Belt Conference football standings
	Conf.			Overall
Team	W		L	W		L
Troy $	6	–	1	8	–	5
Louisiana–Lafayette	5	–	2	6	–	6
Florida Atlantic	4	–	3	7	–	6
Arkansas State	4	–	3	6	–	6
FIU	3	–	4	5	–	7
Middle Tennessee	3	–	4	5	–	7
Louisiana–Monroe	3	–	4	4	–	8
North Texas	0	–	7	1	–	11
$ – Conference champion

The 2008 Troy Trojans football team represented Troy University in the 2008 NCAA Division I FBS football season. The Trojans played their home games at Movie Gallery Stadium in Troy, Alabama and competed in the Sun Belt Conference. The Trojans successfully defended their Sun Belt Championship, winning their third title in a row. Troy was coming off an 8–4 record in 2007.

== Schedule ==
Date	Time	Opponent	Site	TV	Result	Attendance
August 28	6:30 pm	at Middle Tennessee	Johnny "Red" Floyd Stadium; Murfreesboro, Tennessee (Battle for the Palladium)	ESPN+	W 31–17	22,307
September 13	6:00 pm	Alcorn State*	Movie Gallery Stadium; Troy, Alabama		W 65–0	22,105
September 20	11:00 am	at No. 13 Ohio State*	Ohio Stadium; Columbus, Ohio	BTN	L 10–28	102,989
September 27	6:05 pm	at Oklahoma State*	Boone Pickens Stadium; Stillwater, Oklahoma		L 24–55	52,463
October 7	7:00 pm	at Florida Atlantic	Lockhart Stadium; Fort Lauderdale, Florida	ESPN2	W 30–17	17,191
October 18	6:00 pm	FIU	Movie Gallery Stadium; Troy, Alabama	ESPN+	W 33–23	19,316
October 25	6:00 pm	North Texas	Fouts Field; Denton, Texas		W 45–17	18,345
November 1	6:00 pm	at Louisiana–Monroe	Malone Stadium; Monroe, Louisiana	ESPN+	L 30–31	10,112
November 8	2:30 pm	Western Kentucky*^{†}	Movie Gallery Stadium; Troy, Alabama	ESPN+	W 17–7	19,066
November 15	7:00 pm	at No. 19 LSU*	Tiger Stadium; Baton Rouge, Louisiana	PPV	L 31–40	92,103
November 22	6:00 pm	Louisiana–Lafayette	Movie Gallery Stadium; Troy, Alabama		W 48–3	19,443
December 6	6:00 pm	Arkansas State	Movie Gallery Stadium; Troy, Alabama	ESPN+	W 35–9	16,227
December 21	7:15 pm	Southern Miss	Louisiana Superdome; New Orleans (New Orleans Bowl)	ESPN	L 27–30	30,197
*Non-conference game; ^{†}Homecoming; Rankings from AP Poll released prior to the game; All times are in Central time

== Rankings ==
Ranking movements Legend: RV = Received votes
	Week															
Poll	Pre	1	2	3	4	5	6	7	8	9	10	11	12	13	14	Final
AP									RV							
Coaches																
Harris	Not released															Not released
BCS	Not released															Not released

== Personnel ==
=== Coaching staff ===
- Larry Blakeney – Head Coach
- Shayne Wasden – Assistant Head Coach
- Neal Brown – Offensive Coordinator/Quarterbacks
- Jeremy Rowell – Defensive Coordinator/Secondary
- Randy Butler – Defensive Ends/Recruiting Coordinator
- Maurea Crain – Defensive Line
- Kenny Edenfield – Inside Receivers
- Benjy Parker – Linebackers
- John Schlarman – Offensive Line
- Chad Scott – Running Backs
- Richard Shaughnessy – Strength and Conditioning

=== Depth chart ===
Defense

FS
Sherrod Martin
Kedrick Manning

WLB	Middle LB	SLB
⋅	Boris Lee	⋅
Donnell Golden	Xavier Lamb	⋅

SS
Tavares Williams
Bryant McKissic

CB
Trevor Ford
KeJuan Phillips

DE	DT	DT	DE
Brandon Lang	Steve McLendon	Maurice Coleman	Cameron Sheffield
Kenny Mainor	Dion Gales	Daniel Orr	Kenny Mainor

CB
Chris Bowens
Jorrick Calvin

Offense

X-Receiver
Kennard Burton
Chip Reeves

H-Receiver
Jerrel Jernigan
Patrick Cherry

LT	LG	C	RG	RT
Chris Jamison	Tyler Clark	Danny Franks	Wesley Potter	Dion Small
Will Chambliss	Will Chambliss	Steven Adams	Steven Adams	Nic Riley

Z-Receiver
Mykeal Terry
Justin Bray

Y-Receiver
Cornelius Williams
Austin Silvoy

QB
Levi Brown
Jamie Hampton

Key reserves
QB Tanner Jones

RB
DuJuan Harris
Maurice Greer
