= Pitbull Stadium =

Stadium in Miami, Florida, U.S.

South Dade Kia Field at Pitbull Stadium
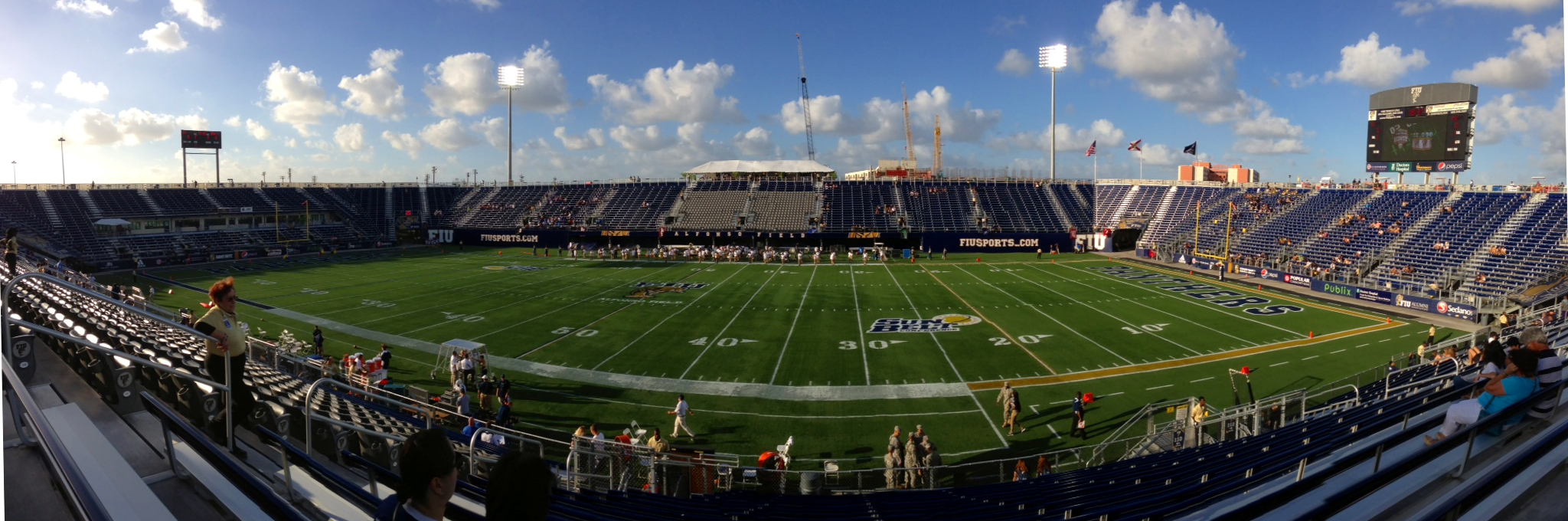

- Location within Florida Location within the United States
- Former names: FIU Community Stadium (1995–2001); Ocean Bank Field at FIU Stadium (2001–2017); Riccardo Silva Stadium (2017–2022); FIU Stadium (2022–2024)
- Location: 11310 Southwest 17th Street; Miami, FL 33175
- Coordinates: 25°45′9″N 80°22′40″W
- Owner: Florida International University
- Operator: Florida International University
- Capacity: 20,000
- Executive suites: 19
- Surface: FieldTurf
- Record attendance: 22,682 (2011 vs. Duke)

Construction
- Groundbreaking: July 24, 1994
- Opened: September 24, 1995
- Expanded: 2001, 2008 and 2012
- Cost: US$3 million (original stadium, 1994) ($6.34 million in 2025 dollars); US$54 million (new stadium, 2007)
- Architects: Rossetti Architects; BEA Architects
- General contractor: Odebrecht Construction

Tenants
- FIU Panthers (NCAA) (1995–present); Football (2002–present); Track and Field (1995–2006); Miami FC (2016–2018, 2020–)

Pitbull Stadium is a college football and soccer stadium on the campus of Florida International University (FIU) in unincorporated Miami-Dade County, Florida, with a Miami mailing address. It is the home stadium of the FIU Panthers football team and the Miami FC soccer team from the USL Championship. The stadium opened in 1995 and has a seating capacity of 20,000.

== History ==
=== FIU Community Stadium ===
FIU Community Stadium was the first dedicated sports facility at the school, replacing Tamiami Field. Construction officially began on July 24, 1994, and the facility opened on September 24, 1995, as a 7,500-seat football and track stadium. It was built as a joint venture between FIU, Miami-Dade County Public Schools, Miami-Dade Parks, and the Miami-Dade County Youth Fair. In anticipation of the inaugural FIU Golden Panthers football (Note: FIU dropped the word "Golden" from its nickname starting in the 2010–11 school year.) season in fall 2002, the university placed movable bleachers around the stadium's all-weather running track in 2001, which increased the stadium's capacity to 17,000 seats.

=== Renovation ===
Years	Stadium capacity
1995–2001	7,500
2002–2007	17,000
2008–2011	18,000
2012–present	20,000

In 2007, the university announced a major expansion and redesign for FIU Stadium. The redesign of FIU Stadium would increase the stadium's capacity to 45,000 fans, to be built in phases. For the first phase of the expansion, the school demolished a large portion of the original 1995 stadium. The west, south and east sides of FIU Stadium were taken down and construction began on the new, permanent stadium. The expansion was completed in September 2008 for the 2008 football season. Phase one increased the stadium's capacity from 17,000 fans to 18,000, including 1,500 club seats. During construction, the 2007 FIU Golden Panthers football team played its home games in the Miami Orange Bowl.

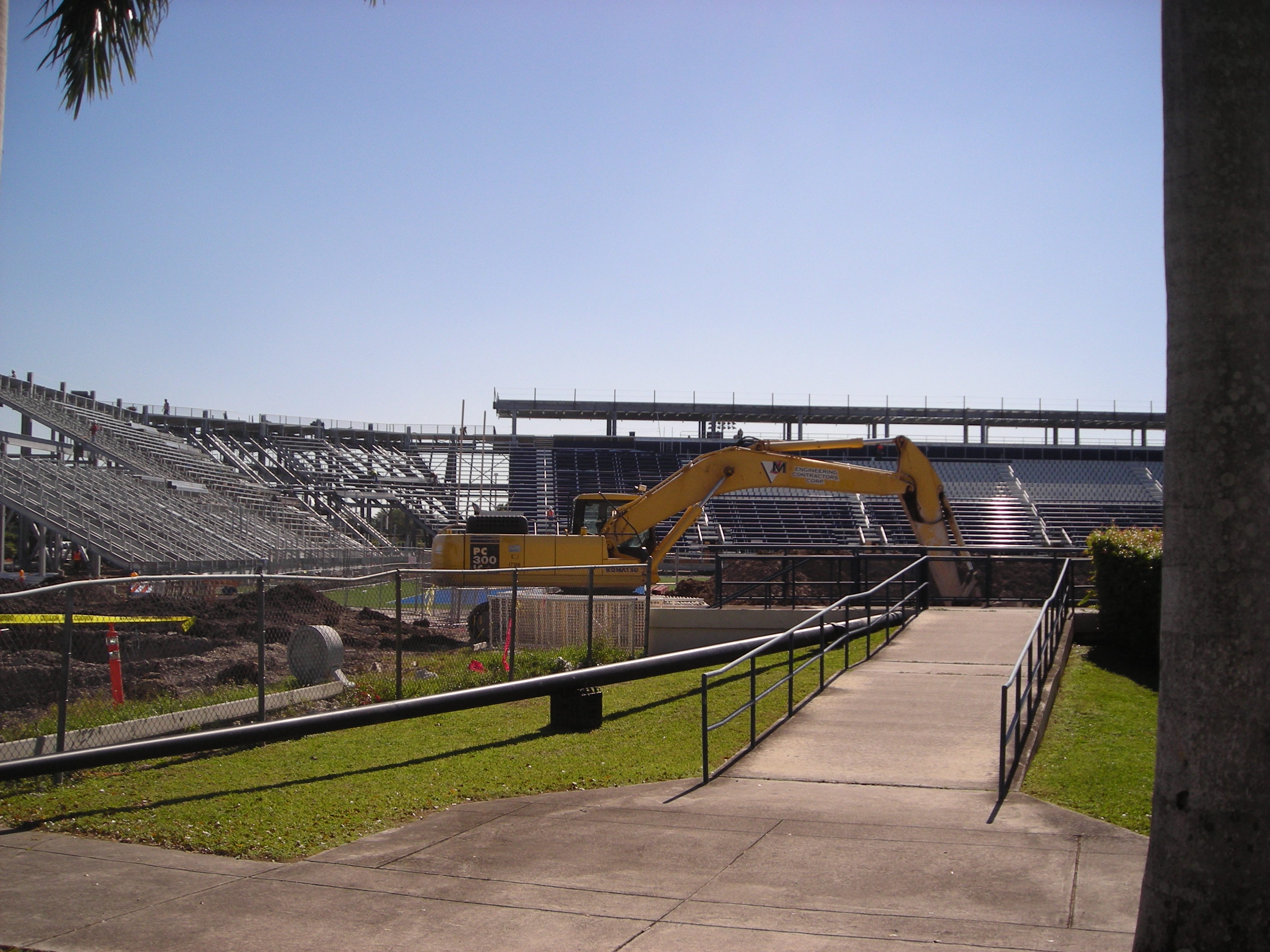
FIU Stadium renovations

The new facility opened for the first home game of the 2008 football season against the South Florida Bulls on September 20. The Golden Panthers lost 17–9 in front of a crowd of 16,717. The team won its first game in the new stadium on October 11, 2008, against Sun Belt Conference rival the Middle Tennessee State Blue Raiders, 31–21. The team finished its first season in the new stadium 5-7. In 2009, the university began the second phase of the stadium expansion, which included the construction of a new football field house. Renovations were completed in 2012 and the capacity increased to 20,000 seats.

In 2017, the university agreed to a five-year deal to rename the stadium after Riccardo Silva, part owner of Miami FC. Before the deal, Silva had donated $3.76 million for various improvements to the stadium including a new playing surface and Jumbotron video scoreboard.

=== Attendance ===
Historical Attendance at FIU Stadium
Rank	Attendance	Date	Game result
1	22,682	October 1, 2011	FIU 27, Duke 31 (2011 Homecoming)
2	20,205	September 12, 2011	FIU 17, UCF 10
3	19,872	September 11, 2010	FIU 14, Rutgers 19
4	18,524	September 24, 2016	FIU 14, UCF 53
5	17,962	October 24, 2015	FIU 41, Old Dominion 12 (2015 Homecoming)

The stadium hosted the Gold Cup in its 2009 and 2011 editions.

On October 1, 2011, FIU Stadium drew its largest attendance in school history. A crowd of 22,268 came to watch the Panthers play the Duke Blue Devils football team for the team's 2011 homecoming game. During the game, the Goodyear Blimp made its first appearance at FIU Stadium. The Miami Tower in Downtown Miami was also lit in blue and gold from September 26 to October 1, 2011, in honor of the game.

On April 19, Miami FC set a club record for attendance at the stadium. The match against Major League Soccer team Inter Miami CF in the Third Round of the 2022 U.S. Open Cup drew 11,158 fans.

=== Renaming ===
On April 3, 2017, FIU Stadium was renamed Riccardo Silva Stadium. The decision to rename the stadium was in recognition of the support given by Italian businessman Riccardo Silva to the FIU Department of Intercollegiate Athletics since 2015.

The newly renamed stadium home opener featured a performance by Grammy-nominated Latin star Maluma. Maluma returned to the stadium in April 2018 to record the video for the Spanish-language version of Jason Derulo's World Cup 2018 anthem for Coca-Cola.

On August 6, 2024, it was reported that American rapper and singer and Miami native Pitbull would be purchasing the naming rights to FIU Stadium, paying $1.2 million annually to rename the stadium to Pitbull Stadium.

== Structure and facilities ==
Designed by Rossetti Architects, the stadium has a 6,500-square-foot (600 m^{2}) Panther Club on the ground level, an upper concourse for additional fan seating and concessions, a jumbotron scoreboard, and 19 luxury suites. Seating includes chairback seats and bench seating, all with backrests. Panther fans shout "Rattle the Cage!" and fans will stomp and jump in unison on the bleachers creating a very loud reverberation throughout the steel and aluminum stadium. The Rattling of the Cage is done throughout the game, notably while the team is on defense and during cheers.

In April 2017 the stadium saw significant improvements made to the facility over the last two months, with completion of two major projects. The first is the installation of a new state of the art playing surface. The new surface, FieldTurf's Revolution 360, features fibers that provide for optimal durability, resilience and feel and is used by many of the country's biggest NFL and soccer teams.

FIU Stadium has also been enhanced by installation of a new videoboard, replacing the existing scoreboard, providing a huge boost to the fan experience at The Miami FC's soccer games. Measuring approximately 31 by 59 feet (9.4 m × 18.0 m), the new videoboard will feature a 13HD pixel layout, the premier technology for outdoor applications within the sports industry. It will have full live video and instant replay capabilities, along with multiple zones of content, including statistics and graphics.

In April 2011, the field was named Alfonso Field after alumnus David F. Alfonso. The facility also includes a two-story, 50,000-square-foot (4,600 m^{2}) field house, named for trustee R. Kirk Landon, which includes a 14,000-square-foot (1,300 m^{2}) weight room. The stadium also includes 8,500 square feet (790 m^{2}) of locker rooms, an equipment room, a full-service athletic training facility, a ticket office, a merchandise area, and an FIU Athletics Hall of Fame.

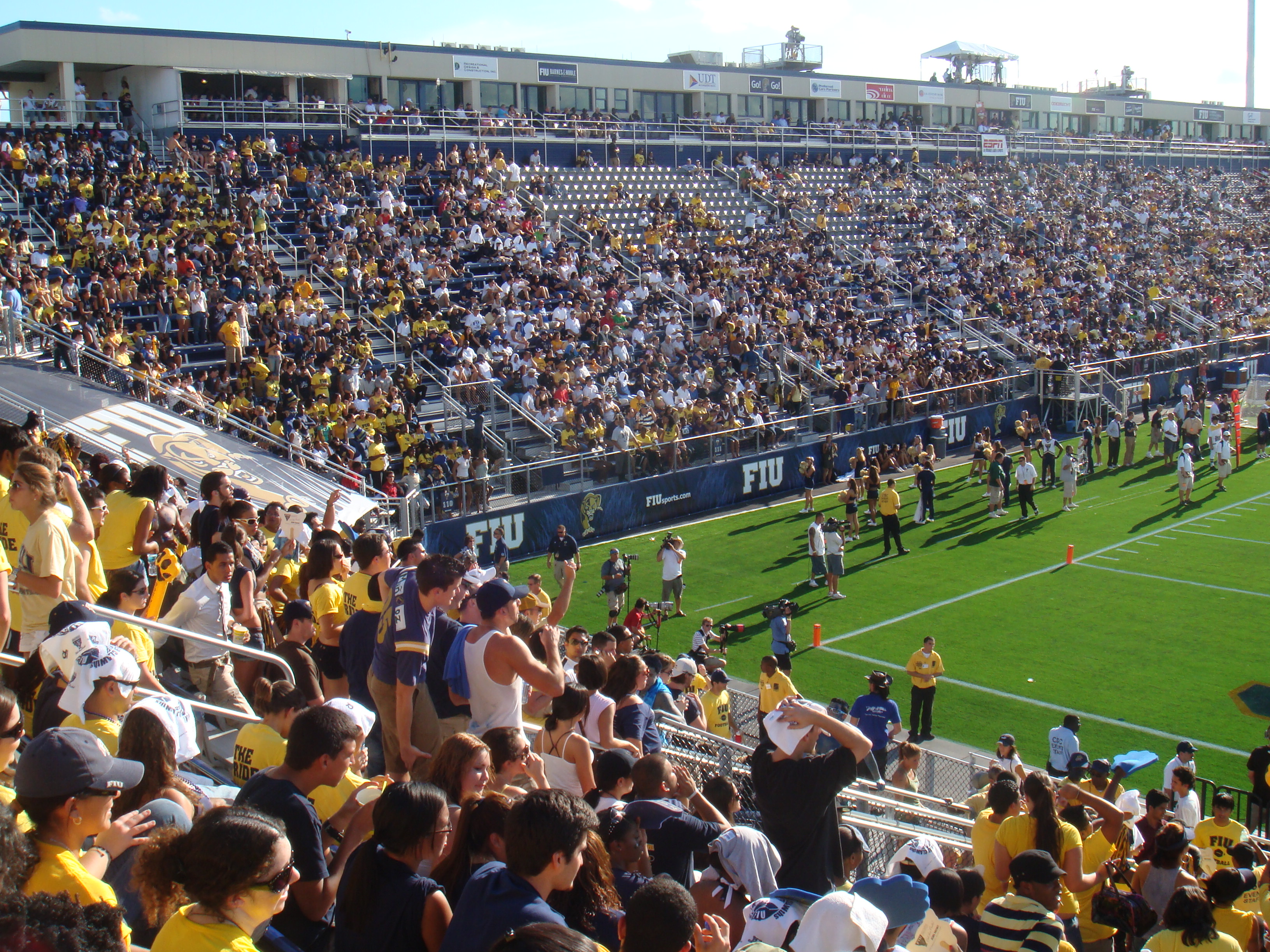
Student section

== Transportation ==
Miami-Dade Transit serves FIU Stadium with Metrobus lines 8, 11, 24, and 71. Bus lines 8, 11, and 24 connect the stadium directly with Downtown Miami and Brickell. For students at the Biscayne Bay Campus, the Golden Panther Express offers direct bus service to FIU Stadium. The stadium has multiple bike racks for fans traveling by bicycle. Parking on game days is free. Tailgate parking areas around the stadium open six hours before kickoff.

== See also ==
- Shula Bowl
- FIU Baseball Stadium
- Ocean Bank Convocation Center
- List of NCAA Division I FBS football stadiums
