= Tyrell Fenroy =

American college football player (born 1987)

No. 32
- Position: Running back

Personal information
- Born: June 3, 1987 (age 39); New Orleans, Louisiana, U.S.
- Listed height: 5 ft 10 in (1.78 m)
- Listed weight: 205 lb (93 kg)

Career information
- High school: St. Charles Catholic (Laplace, Louisiana)
- College: UL Lafayette (2005–2008)

Awards and highlights
- Sun Belt Player of the Year (2008); Sun Belt Freshman of the Year (2005); 3× First-team All-Sun Belt (2006–2008); Second-team All-Sun Belt (2005)

Tyrell Joseph Fenroy (born March 6, 1987) is an American former football running back who played college football for the UL Lafayette Ragin' Cajuns. He was signed by the Chicago Bears as an undrafted free agent in 2009, but never played in any NFL game. He is now a school resource officer (SRO) at Lafayette Renaissance Charter Academy.

== Early life ==
Fenroy attended St. Charles Catholic High School in Laplace, Louisiana prior to attending ULL. He earned Class 3A All-State honors as a senior with 1,580 rushing yards on 166 carries in the regular season a total that ranked 9th in the state among all five classifications. He rushed for 32 touchdowns in the 10-game regular season and had 34 total scores. Tyrell's 206 points in 10 games were second among all state players. Including the playoffs, he rushed for 2,100 yards and scored 44 TDs as a senior and did not fumble once all season.

He was named MVP in District 10-3A each of his last two seasons. Fenroy was named Clarion Herald All-Elite Team/Offensive MVP. Overall, he finished his career with 4,320 yards rushing and 72 touchdowns and had 540 receiving yards and five receiving scores.

On special teams, Tyrell piled up 854 kick return yards and five return touchdowns. Fenroy finished his prep career with 5,714 all-purpose yards and 82 touchdowns.

== College career ==
Fenroy was named to the all Sun Belt Conference team each of his four seasons at Louisiana-Lafayette. He earned Second-team All Conference honors after his 2005 freshman year and First-team All Conference following the 2006, 2007, and 2008 seasons. He was honored with the Conference Player of the Year award in 2008. He ended his career as a Ragin Cajun with 4,646 yards and 48 touchdowns. He ran for a career-high and school record in rushing yards with 297 yards as well as 3 touchdowns on October 4, 2008 against the UL Monroe.

Fenroy holds the all-time rushing record for Louisiana-Lafayette (previously Brian Mitchell), the Sun Belt Conference (previously Patrick Cobbs of North Texas), and the state of Louisiana (previously Kevin Faulk of Louisiana State University.) Fenroy was honored as one of the top running backs in the nation his senior season by becoming one of ten semi-finalists for the 2008 Doak Walker Award.

Fenroy became only the 7th player in NCAA Division I-A history to rush for four consecutive 1,000 yard seasons.

Before the final game of his career, Tyrell had his jersey retired by the university, an honor reserved for players that have finished their career. Tyrell is enrolled back at ULL in order to finish requirements needed to obtain his degree in Criminal Justice. Fenroy is currently a SRO (School Resource Officer) at Lafayette Renaissance Charter High School in Lafayette, LA.

== Professional career ==
=== Pre-draft ===
In preparation for the 2009 NFL draft, Fenroy ran a hand-timed 40 yard dash at 4.46 seconds (fastest time) and an average of 4.51 seconds. He had a 38-inch vertical jump and finished 18 bench press repetitions of 225 pounds.

=== Chicago Bears ===
After going undrafted in the 2009 NFL draft, Fenroy signed with the Chicago Bears as an undrafted free agent on April 27. The Bears waived Fenroy on May 5.

=== Las Vegas Locomotives ===
On June 19, 2009, it was announced that Fenroy agreed to terms with the Calgary Stampeders of the Canadian Football League. However, on the following day, Fenroy informed The Advertiser that he was drafted by the Las Vegas Locomotives of the upstart United Football League. Fenroy said of the situation of being a member of two teams, "I was drafted by the Las Vegas team today, and their running back coach (Charles Shelton, also the team's director of football operations) called me today. So if the CFL doesn't come up with a bigger deal, I'm heading there (to Las Vegas)."

Fenroy decided to go to the UFL over the CFL on June 22, and his signing was announced on August 31.
