= List of Troy Trojans head football coaches =

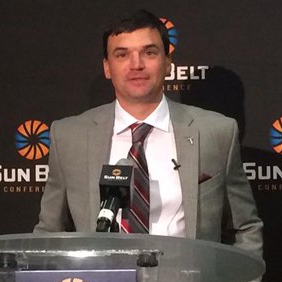
Neal Brown served as the head coach of the Troy Trojans from 2015 to 2018.

The Troy Trojans college football team represents Troy University as a member of the Sun Belt Conference. The Trojans competes as part of the NCAA Division I Football Bowl Subdivision. The program has had 24 head coaches, and two interim head coaches, since it began play during the 1909 season. Since December 2023, Gerad Parker has served as head coach at Troy.

== Key ==
Key to symbols in coaches list
General		Overall		Conference		Postseason (Note: Although the first Rose Bowl Game was played in 1902, it has been continuously played since the 1916 game, and is recognized as the oldest bowl game by the NCAA. "—" indicates any season prior to 1916 when postseason games were not played.)	
No.	Order of coaches (Note: A running total of the number of head coaches, with coaches who served separate tenures being counted only once. Interim head coaches are represented with "Int" and are not counted in the running total. "—" indicates the team played but either without a coach or no coach is on record. "X" indicates an interim year without play.)	GC	Games coached	CW	Conference wins	PW	Postseason wins
DC	Division championships	OW	Overall wins	CL	Conference losses	PL	Postseason losses
CC	Conference championships	OL	Overall losses	CT	Conference ties	PT	Postseason ties
NC	National championships	OT	Overall ties (Note: Overtime rules in college football were introduced in 1996, making ties impossible in the period since.)	C%	Conference winning percentage		
†	Elected to the College Football Hall of Fame	O%	Overall winning percentage (Note: When computing the win–loss percentage, a tie counts as half a win and half a loss.)				

== Coaches ==
List of head football coaches showing season(s) coached, overall records, conference records, postseason records, championships and selected awards (Note: Statistics correct as of the end of the 2025 NCAA Division I FBS football season.)
No.	Name (Note: Troy did not have a head coach for their 1930 season.)	Season(s) (Note: Troy State did not field teams from 1913–1920, 1929, and 1943–1945.)	GC	OW	OL	OT	O%	CW	CL	CT	C%	PW	PL	PT	CC	NC	Awards
1	Virgil McKinley	1909	3	1	0	2	0.667	—	—	—	—	—	—	—	—	0	—
2	Dan Herren	1910	4	1	1	2	0.500	—	—	—	—	—	—	—	—	0	—
3	George Penton	1911–1912	9	7	1	7	0.833	—	—	—	—	—	—	—	—	0	—
4	J. W. Campbell	1921–1923	26	12	13	1	0.481	—	—	—	—	—	—	—	—	0	—
5	Ross V. Ford	1924	7	2	1	4	0.571	—	—	—	—	—	—	—	—	0	—
6	Otis Bynum	1925–1926	17	12	4	1	0.735	—	—	—	—	—	—	—	—	0	—
7	Gladwin Gaumer	1927–1928	14	7	7	0	0.500	—	—	—	—	—	—	—	—	0	—
8	Albert Elmore	1931–1936	53	31	20	2	0.604	—	—	—	—	—	—	—	—	0	—
9	Albert Choate	1937–1942, 1946	63	27	33	3	0.452	15	3	1	0.816	—	—	—	3	0	—
10	Fred McCollum	1947–1950	41	20	18	3	0.524	8	3	3	0.679	—	—	—	1	0	—
11	Jim Grantham	1951–1954	35	11	23	1	0.329	5	7	0	0.417	—	—	—	0	0	—
12	William Clipson	1955–1965	94	26	68	0	0.277	10	23	0	0.303	—	—	—	0	0	—
13	Billy Atkins	1966–1971	62	44	16	2	0.726	18	5	0	0.783	2	0	0	4	1 – 1968	NAIA Coach of the Year (1968)
14	Tom Jones	1972–1973	20	11	7	2	0.600	8	4	1	0.654	0	0	0	1	0	—
15	Byrd Whigham	1974–1975	20	12	8	0	0.600	9	7	0	0.563	0	0	0	0	0	—
16	Charlie Bradshaw	1976–1982	69	40	27	2	0.594	29	18	0	0.617	0	0	0	1	0	—
17	Chan Gailey	1983–1984	24	19	5	0	0.792	11	4	0	0.733	3	0	0	1	1 – 1984	—
18	Rick Rhoades	1985–1987	36	28	7	1	0.792	22	2	0	0.917	3	0	0	2	1 – 1987	—
19	Robert Maddox	1988–1990	30	13	17	0	0.433	10	14	0	0.417	0	0	0	0	0	—
20	Larry Blakeney	1991–2014	292	178	113	1	0.611	77	39	0	0.664	7	10	0	8	0	—
21	Neal Brown	2015–2018	51	35	16	—	0.686	23	9	—	0.719	3	0	—	1	0	—
22	Chip Lindsey	2019–2021	34	15	19	—	0.441	9	13	—	0.409	0	0	—	0	0	—
Int.	Brandon Hall	2021	1	0	1	—	.000	0	1	—	.000	0	0	—	0	0	—
23	Jon Sumrall	2022–2023	27	23	4	—	0.852	14	2	—	0.875	1	0	—	2	0	—
Int.	Greg Gasparato	2023	1	0	1	—	.000	0	0	—	–	0	1	—	0	0	—
24	Gerad Parker	2024–present	26	12	14	—	0.462	9	7	—	0.563	0	1	—	0	0	—
