= Robert W. Smith (musician) =

American composer, arranger, and teacher (1958–2023)

- Born: Robert William Smith; October 24, 1958; Daleville, Alabama, U.S.
- Died: September 21, 2023 (aged 64) Montgomery, Alabama, U.S.
- Occupations: Composer, teacher
- Instrument: Trumpet

Robert William Smith (October 24, 1958 – September 21, 2023) was an American composer, arranger, and teacher.

== Biography ==
Robert William Smith was born in Daleville, Alabama, on October 24, 1958. He attended Troy State University, where he played lead trumpet in the Sound of the South Marching Band. While at Troy, he studied composition with Paul Yoder.

In 1997, Smith became the Director of Bands at Troy State University, where he remained for four years. In 2001, he was hired by Warner Brothers Publications. His position with Warner took him all over the world, acting as guest conductor and clinician with many ensembles. Smith's career with Warner Bros. continued until 2005, when it was bought out by Alfred Music Publishing.

His album Don Quixote was nominated for the 8th Annual Independent Music Awards for Contemporary Classical Album.

Smith was the coordinator of the Music Industry program at Troy University as well as the Vice-President of Product Development for the C. L. Barnhouse Company and Walking Frog Records.

Robert W. Smith died due to complications following heart surgery in Montgomery, Alabama, on September 21, 2023.

== Compositions ==
Smith published over 600 works, including three symphonies.

- Symphony No. 1, The Divine Comedy, inspired by Dante's poem.
- Symphony No. 2, The Odyssey, inspired by Homer’s epic poem.
- Symphony No. 3, Don Quixote, inspired by the Miguel de Cervantes novel.

In 2011, Smith composed Earhart: Sounds of Courage in memory of Mary Jo Leahey which was premiered at the Mary Jo Leahey Symphonic Band Camp at University of Massachusetts Lowell on July 21, 2012. The piece reflected the bravery of Amelia Earhart as she attempted to fly around the world in 1937. It was commissioned by Deb Huber, associate director of bands at UMass Lowell.

Smith also composed two works dedicated to solo instruments–-contemporary concertos for the flute family and the euphonium—entitled Gemeinhardt Suite, and Willson Suite respectively. Smith's piece "Into The Storm" was written to commemorate the powerful 1993 winter storm that brutalized the eastern United States. This piece is often worked into various themes and reset in different ensembles such as a version played by an orchestra, substituting the flute ostinato as a violin part; or otherwise used as a part of a marching band show (See Sandy Creek Marching Band).

Smith was a brother of Kappa Kappa Psi, having been initiated into the Zeta Upsilon chapter at then Troy State University in April 1977. His work "To the Summit" is subtitled "Strive for the Highest". The middle section of "To the Summit" is an arrangement of the Kappa Kappa Psi Fraternity Hymn. Smith was a brother of Phi Mu Alpha Sinfonia, initiated at James Madison University in 1996, and the fraternity commissioned the piece Spirit of Orpheus in 1998.

== Other work ==
In addition to composing for bands, Smith enjoyed success writing for drum and bugle corps. He had been a member of the Charioteers Drum and Bugle Corps in Alabama in the mid-1970s. His first great success came in the mid-1980s while he was writing for the Suncoast Sound, from Clearwater, Florida – a tenure which included Suncoast's 1985 program, "A Florida Suite," the first completely original musical program ever done by a drum corps. He would later go on to write for Magic of Orlando for several years. Until 2007, he wrote for the Glassmen Drum and Bugle Corps, of Toledo, Ohio. From 2011 to 2014 he arranged for the Madison Scouts Drum and Bugle Corps. In 2013, he began writing for the Troopers Drum and Bugle Corps.

Before the beginning of the 2006–2007 school year, Troy University announced the re-hiring of Smith to the position of Coordinator of the Music Industry program. In December 2006, Smith announced his appointment as Director of Product Development for the C. L. Barnhouse Company along with an exclusive publishing arrangement with the firm.
