= Ross Ford (disambiguation) =

Ross Ford (born 1984) is a Scottish rugby union player and coach.

Ross Ford may also refer:

- Ross V. Ford (1900–1955), American football player and coach
- Ross Ford (actor) (1923–1988), American film and television actor
- Ross Ford (politician), American politician, member of the Oklahoma House of Representatives
