= Gemeinhardt Suite =

Symphonic band suite

Gemeinhardt Suite is a symphonic band suite composed by Robert W. Smith, in 1997. It was commissioned by, and dedicated to the Gemeinhardt Company, makers of all types of flutes, and piccolos. It is scored for the typical wind orchestra, as well as an extended flute choir.

The piece is considered a staple in flute repertory, though it has been overshadowed by some of Smith’s other works. This composition is a contemporary concerto, one of two that Smith wrote, the other being the Willson Suite, for the euphonium.

The entire suite is devoted to the flute family. It is divided into three movements: Carousel, Telling Stories to the Sea, and, Ceremony of Flute and Drum.

== Movements ==
=== I. Carousel ===
The first movement relies heavily on the woodwind side of a concert band. Underneath an intricate flute solo, there are clarinets, and saxophones walking to a pleasant beat which sounds uncannily like a carousel. The solo flautist is given the choice of a technically demanding version, or a slightly simplified version. Either option involves long solos performed in free time with no meter. The movement only brings up the brass section two/three times before drawing to a loud close.

=== II. Telling Stories to the Sea ===
The second movement is playing by a moderately-sized extended flute choir. Along with the four-six C Flutes, 1 C piccolo, 1 bass flute, marimbas, bongos, and shakers are needed. The movement unravels quickly, giving a bass flute solo/flute solo/piccolo solo/flute solo before a rhythmically complex closing.

=== III. Ceremony of Flute and Drum ===
The final movement is similar (in formation) to the first, however, relies heavily, this time, on the brass/percussion section. It is a very earthy song dispersed with challenging, rapidly moving flute and other woodwind phrases, winding around blocks of the brass body. This movement is the most demanding of the entire concert-band out of all the movements, and the solo flautist is given quite the work-out, right up until the charged ending.
