= You're a Grand Old Flag =

Song composed by George M. Cohan

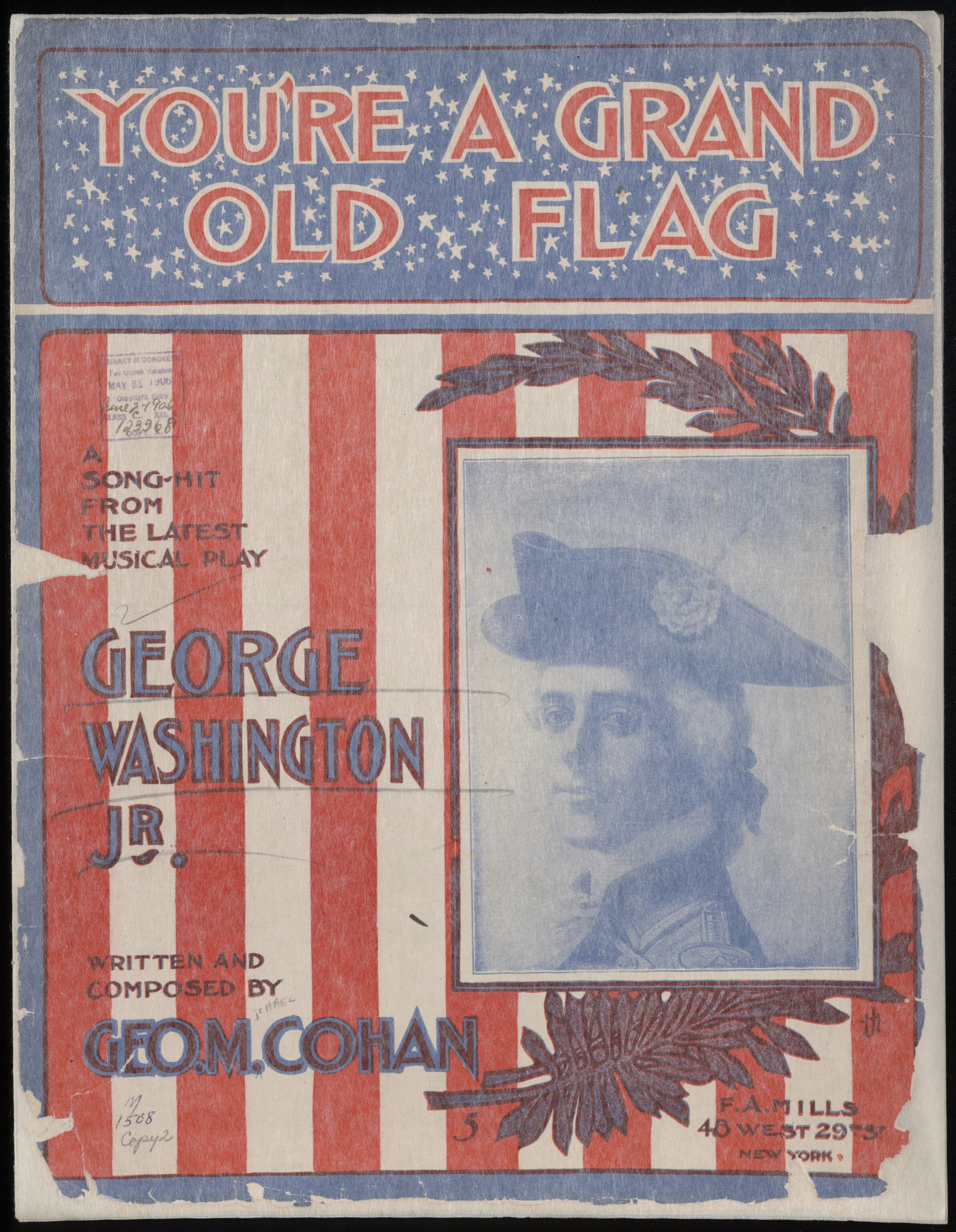
- Cover of 1906 sheet music

Song
- Published: 1906 by F.A. Mills
- Genre: Patriotic; American march
- Songwriter: George M. Cohan
- Paul V. Yoder's arrangement of "You're a Grand Old Flag"'s chorus, as performed by a United States Army band.

"You're a Grand Old Flag" is an American patriotic march. The song, a spirited march written by George M. Cohan, is a tribute to the U.S. flag. In addition to obvious references to the flag, it incorporates snippets of other popular songs, including one of his own. Cohan wrote it in 1906 for his stage musical George Washington, Jr.

== History ==
The song was first publicly performed on February 6, the play's opening night, at Herald Square Theater in New York City. "You're a Grand Old Flag" quickly became the first song from a musical to sell over a million copies of sheet music. The title and first lyric comes from someone Cohan once met; the Library of Congress website notes. "You're a Grand Old Flag" would go on to become one of the most popular U.S. marching-band pieces of all time.

The original lyric for this perennial George M. Cohan favorite came, as Cohan later explained, from an encounter he had with a Civil War veteran who fought at Gettysburg. The two men found themselves next to each other and Cohan noticed the vet held a carefully folded but ragged old flag. The man reportedly then turned to Cohan and said, "She's a grand old rag." Cohan thought it was a great line and originally named his tune "You're a Grand Old Rag". So many groups and individuals objected to calling the flag a "rag," however, that he "gave 'em what they wanted" and switched words, renaming the song "You're a Grand Old Flag".

In the play itself, the scene with the Civil War soldier was replicated. The soldier's comment was the lead-in to this song. Thus, the first version of the chorus began, "You're a grand old rag / You're a high-flying flag". Despite Cohan's efforts to pull that version, some artists such as Billy Murray had recorded it under its original title, "The Grand Old Rag", in advance of the play's opening, and copies under that title still circulate among collectors. Cohan's second attempt at writing the chorus began, "You're a grand old flag / Though you're torn to a rag". The final version, with its redundant rhyme, is as shown below.

Today, many different arrangements of the song exist. In particular, Paul V. Yoder's 1954 arrangement of "You're a Grand Old Flag" is a version commonly used today by the U.S. military in its performances of the song.

== Lyrics ==
Instrumental chorus
U.S. Air Force Band, 1997

1906 recording
Billy Murray

Instrumental chorus
U.S. Marine Corps band performing Paul Yoder's arrangement's chorus during a flag-raising ceremony at MCB Camp Pendleton in February 2012

Verse 1
There's a feeling comes a-stealing,
And it sets my brain a-reeling,
When I'm list'ning to the music of a military band.
Any tune like "Yankee Doodle"
Simply sets me off my noodle,
It's that patriotic something that no one can understand.

"Way down South, in the land of cotton," (Note: Reference to "Dixie".)
Melody untiring,
Ain't that inspiring?

Hurrah! Hurrah! We'll join the jubilee! (Note: Reference to "Marching Through Georgia".)
And that's going some, for the Yankees, by gum! (Note: Line taken directly from the previous year's Cohan hit, "The Yankee Doodle Boy".)
Red, White and Blue, I am for you!
Honest, you're a grand old flag!

Verse 2
I'm no cranky hanky panky,
I'm a dead square, honest Yankee,
And I'm mighty proud of that old flag that flies for Uncle Sam.
Though I don't believe in raving
Ev'ry time I see it waving,
There's a chill runs up my back that makes me glad I'm what I am.

Here's a land with a million soldiers,
That's if we should need 'em,
We'll fight for freedom!

Hurrah! Hurrah! For ev'ry Yankee Tar, (Note: Old fashioned slang for a sailor, a.k.a. "Jack Tar". See tar.)
And old G.A.R., ev'ry stripe, ev'ry star.
Red, White and Blue, hats off to you!
Honest, you're a grand old flag!

Chorus
You're a grand old flag,
You're a high-flying flag,
And forever in peace may you wave.
You're the emblem of the land I love,
The home of the free and the brave. (Note: Reference to "The Star-Spangled Banner".)
Ev'ry heart beats true
'Neath the Red, White and Blue, (Note: Or "Under Red, White and Blue".)
Where there's never a boast or brag.
But should auld acquaintance be forgot, (Note: Reference to "Auld Lang Syne".)
Keep your eye on the grand old flag.

== Uses ==
The song is often performed by marching bands on Flag Day, as the holiday is intended to celebrate the flag of the United States.

A modified version of the song was also used by the Yippies in 1968 for their nomination of Pigasus.

The song with modified lyrics has been modified for use as the fight song of the Melbourne Football Club who play in the Australian Football League, as well as by state league clubs West Perth Football Club in the WAFL, Sturt Football Club and Norwood Football Club in the SANFL, North Hobart Football Club in the TSL, Port Melbourne Football Club and the Casey Demons in the VFL as well as the Mansfield Eagles in the Goulburn Valley Football League.

== See also ==
- "The Stars and Stripes Forever"
- Flag anthem
