= Sound of the South Marching Band =

Marching band of Troy University

Sound of the South
- School: Troy University
- Location: Troy, Alabama, USA
- Conference: Sun Belt Conference
- Founded: 1939
- Director: Dr. Mark J. Walker
- Members: 350
- Fight song: "Trojans One & All"
- Website: www.soundofthesouth.org

The Sound of the South is the official marching band of Troy University. The marching band was established in 1939 and has been referred to by its current name since 1965. The band was named by John M. Long soon after he was hired as band director. The band has enjoyed major success in performing at hundreds of marching band competitions, dozens of different college and professional football venues, and follows the football team to almost every away game. The band's "trademark" piece that is played before every performance of the band is called "The Fanfare" and was written by Long in 1965.

== Early history ==
The Troy University Band has been a part of the university since 1939 when Lawrence Peterson was appointed the first director in the newly formed band at what was then Troy State Teacher's College. A year later the marching band made its first public appearance during the 1940 Homecoming festivities. Peterson held his position for seven years and in 1947 Gilbert Stephenson accepted the position as the school's second director. The following year brought many changes for the band including the first show with marching uniforms, the first guest appearance (by Paul Yoder), and the first spring band festival in 1948. In 1953 the band hired its third director, John P. Graham. Two years following, in 1955, James Patrenos was appointed as fourth director of the then Troy State College band. In 1960 Richard Melvin was selected to replace Patrenos and became the band's fifth director. Carl Vollrath held the position of Interim Director from 1964–1965.

The band as it is known today ("Sound of the South") was founded in 1965 by John M. Long. In addition to building what has become a nationally recognized band program, he has also served in his tenure as the Dean of the College of Arts and Sciences, Dean of the School of Fine Arts and special assistant to Chancellor Dr. Ralph Adams. He was one of the first bandmasters in the Southern United States to be elected as president of the prestigious American Bandmasters Association. In 1996, he was elected to the National Band Association Hall of Fame of Distinguished Band Conductors. It was during the thirty-two year tenure of Johnny Long, as he was commonly referred to, that the band program at Troy University established a prominent national reputation through its many featured appearances at music conventions, concert tours and recordings with the symphony band, as well as several nationally televised appearances with the "Sound of the South" marching band.

== Recent history ==
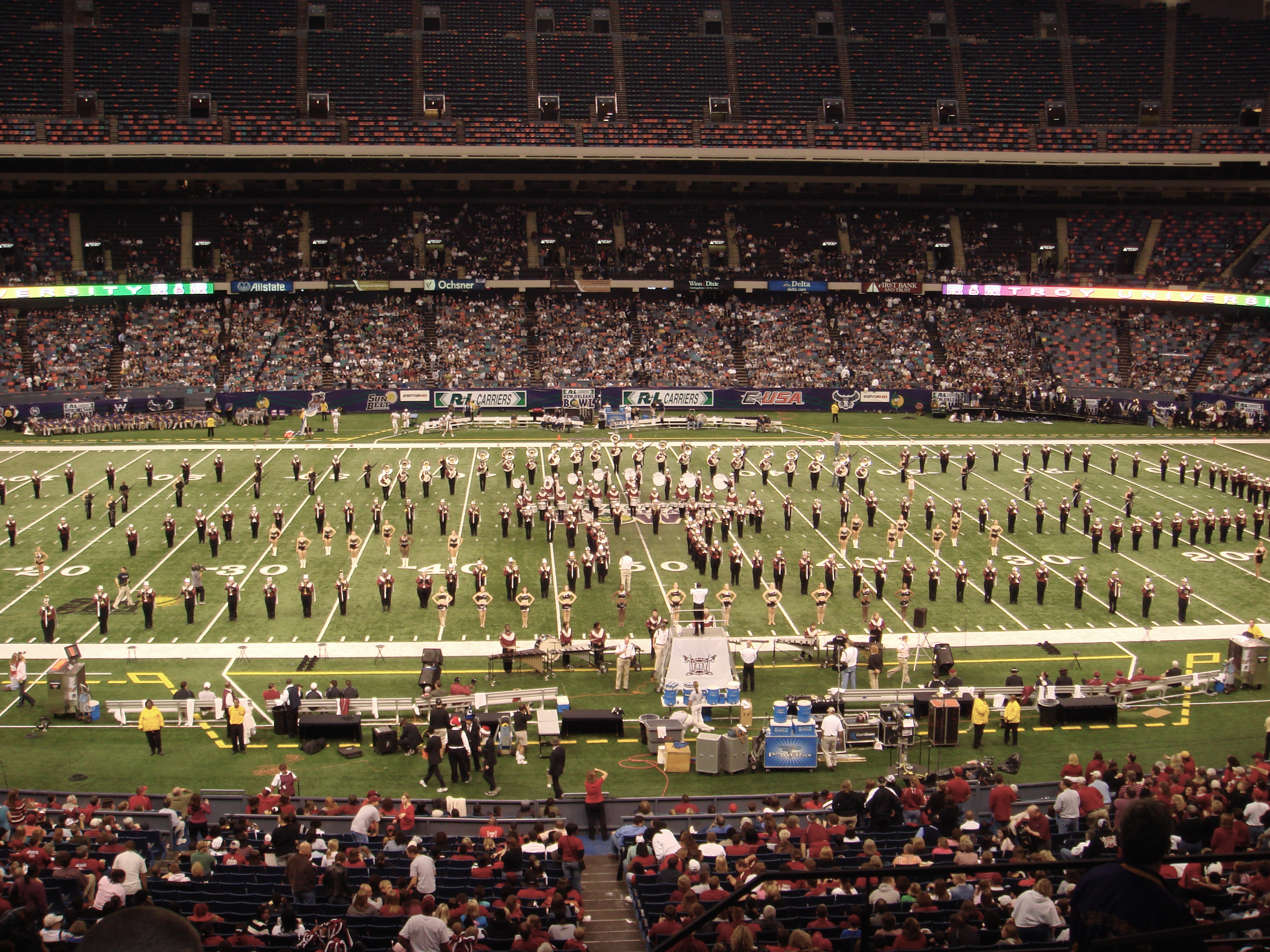
Troy University's Sound of the South performing their halftime show at the 2006 New Orleans Bowl.

The "Sound of the South" plays halftime shows at all Troy home football games and many of the away games; Some recent trips have been to the University of Nebraska–Lincoln, University of Miami, University of Arkansas, Mississippi State University, University of Florida, Louisiana State University, and the University of Georgia. The "Sound" has been featured at numerous bowl games, including the Peach Bowl, the Senior Bowl, the Blue–Gray Football Classic, the R+L Carriers New Orleans Bowl, the Dollar General Bowl, and most recently The Cure Bowl. The band has also been featured in halftime performances for the Atlanta Falcons, Miami Dolphins, New Orleans Saints and Tampa Bay Buccaneers. Over the past few years, the band has performed for over 500,000 fans.

== Directors of the Sound of the South ==
- John M. Long (1965–1996)
- Ralph Ford (interim) (1996–1997)
- Robert W. Smith (1997–2001)
- Ralph Ford (2001–2010)
- Mark J. Walker (2010–present)

== Band program recordings ==
=== Albums ===
- 1967: The Sound of the South: Troy State College Band 1966-67 (LP, Century Custom Records 28128)
- 1968: The Troy State University Collegiate Singers and the Symphonic Band (LP, Tom Britton Productions URS-1059)
- 1972: The Troy State University Symphonic Band (LP, Mark Custom Records 7208)
- 1975: The Sound's in Town: 1975 Football Season (LP, Mark IV)
- 1975: Second Annual Southeastern United States Band Clinic: Troy State University Band (LP)
- 1976: Troy State Collegiate Singers: 1975-1976 Season Highlights (LP, Recorded Publications Company)
- 1976: Third Annual Southeastern United States Band Clinic: Troy State University Band (LP)
- 1977: The Sound is Back in Town: 1977 Football Season (LP, Stith Custom Records MS 122377)
- 1980: Troy State University Symphony Band (LP)
- 1981: Troy State University Band (LP)
- 198?: Heritage of the March, Volume KKKK (LP, Robert Hoe)
- 198?: Heritage of the March, Volume SSS (LP, Robert Hoe)
- 1994: 1994 Troy Symphony Band (CD, American Multimedia)
- 1996: The 1996 Symphony Band (CD)
- 1997: Troy University Symphony Band: Live! (CD)
- 1998: American Celebration! (CD, ZEUP Productions)
- 200?: Salute to Dr. Paul Yoder - 40th Anniversary Album (CD, American Bandmasters Association)
- 2000: The "Sound's" in Town, Volume II (CD)
- 20??: The "Sound's" in Town, Vol. III (CD)
- 200?: Best of the "Sound", Vol. 1 (CD)
- 2006: Troy University Symphony Band: A Wish to the World (CD, Stormworks TDIV407)
- 2008: The Sound's in Town: Coast to Coast (CD, Ilium Records)
- 2011: Troy University Symphony Band: Continuum - The Wind Music of Robert Buckley (CD)
- 2012: Game Day! (CD, Ilium Records)
- 2014: American Bandmasters Convention Presents Troy University Symphony Band (CD, Vestige Audio)

=== Appearances ===
- 1976: Hansen's Concert Band Sampler: Troy State University Summer Band (LP, Hansen Records)

The band has recorded for the Warner Bros. Records Marching Band Promotional Compact Disc since 1998, which is distributed to over 38,000 bands. This is thanks in part to former director of bands Ralph Ford who composed and arranged over 175 pieces of music for symphonic band, concert band, jazz band, and marching band.
