= Troy Trojans football =

American football team representing Troy University (Alabama, USA)

2026 Troy Trojans football team
- First season: 1909; 117 years ago
- Athletic director: Brent Jones
- General manager: Drew Casa
- Head coach: Gerad Parker; 3rd season, 16–18 (.471)
- Location: Troy, Alabama
- Stadium: Veterans Memorial Stadium (capacity: 30,470)
- NCAA division: Division I FBS
- Conference: Sun Belt
- Division: West
- Colors: Cardinal, silver, and black
- All-time record: 587–446–28 (.566)
- Bowl record: 6–4 (.600)

NCAA Division II championships
- 1984, 1987

NAIA national championships
- 1968

Conference championships
- ACC: 1939, 1941, 1942, 1967, 1968, 1969 GSC: 1971, 1973, 1976, 1984, 1986, 1987 Southland: 1996, 1999, 2000 SBC: 2006, 2007, 2008, 2009, 2010, 2017, 2022, 2023

Division championships
- SBC East: 2018 SBC West: 2022, 2023, 2025
- Rivalries: South Alabama (rivalry); Jacksonville State (rivalry); Middle Tennessee (rivalry)

Uniforms
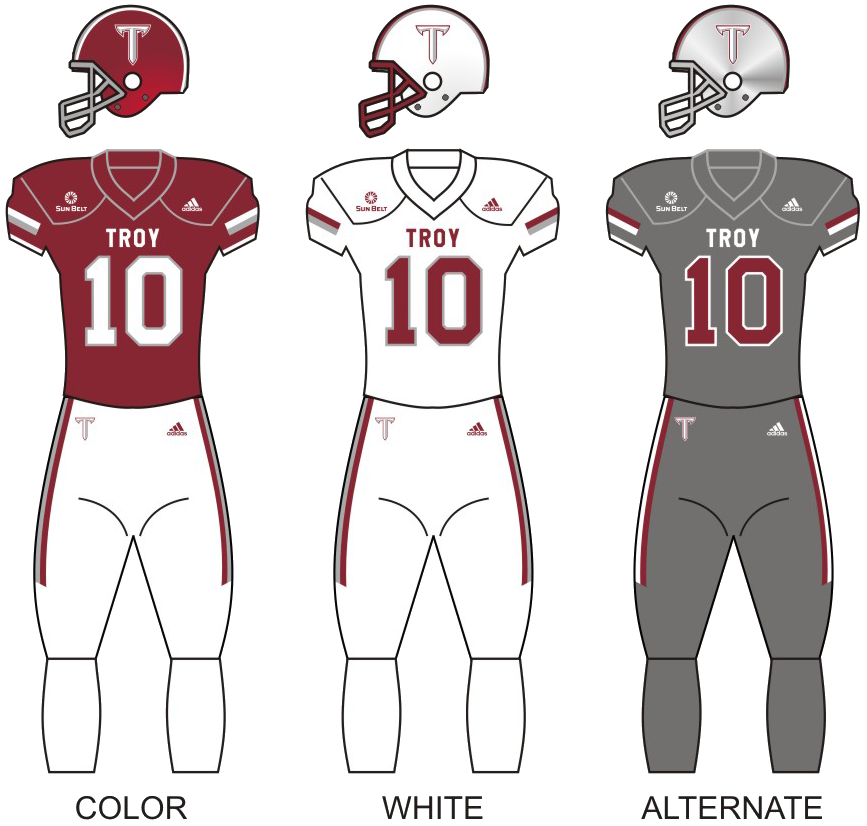
- Fight song: "Trojans One & All"
- Mascot: T-Roy
- Marching band: The Sound of the South
- Outfitter: Adidas
- Website: troytrojans.com

The Troy Trojans football program represents Troy University at the NCAA Division I Football Bowl Subdivision (FBS) level, where it has competed since 2001. The football program joined the Sun Belt Conference in 2004. The current head football coach is Gerad Parker. Troy has won 23 conference championships, with eight in the Sun Belt Conference. The Trojans play home games at Veterans Memorial Stadium in Troy, Alabama.

== History ==
=== Early history (1909–1965) ===
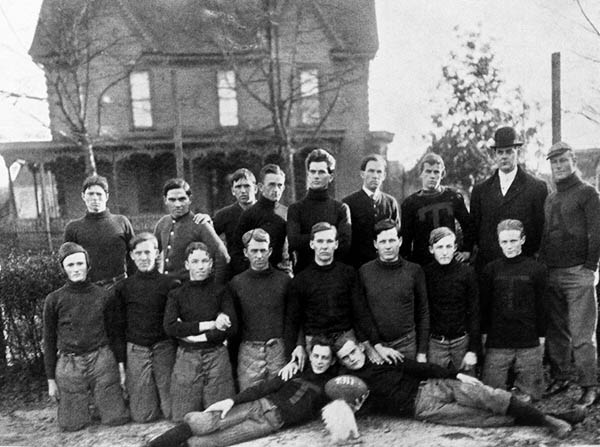
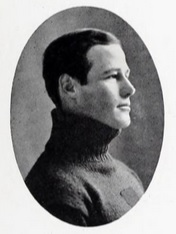
(Left): Portrait of the 1909 Troy Normal School Teachers team, the first fielded by the University; (right): George Penton, team coach in 1911–12

Troy University has fielded a football team continuously since 1946. Prior to that year, the team was fielded with many interruptions from 1909 to 1942. Eight years were skipped from 1913 to 1920 due to lack of participation and later World War I, while the Wall Street Crash of 1929 kept the team from playing that year.

Coach George Penton led the Troy Trojans for two seasons, 1911 and 1912. Under his tutelage, the Trojans completed their only undefeated season, a 3–0 record.

Albert Elmore was the head coach from 1931 to 1937. A University of Alabama alumnus, he is credited with changing the team name to "Red Wave" (a variation of Alabama's "Crimson Tide"). In seven years at Troy State, five of which were winning seasons, Elmore compiled a 35–30–3 record.

In 1947, Fred McCollum took the head coaching position at Troy State. From 1947 to 1950, he compiled an overall record of 20 wins, 18 losses and three ties (20–18–3) with the Red Wave, which included back to back six-win seasons in 1948–1949.

William Clipson was head football coach from 1955 to 1965. His overall record of 20–68 included a 6–3 winning season in 1964. He had previously served as football coach at Troy High School from 1942 to 1951 and head basketball coach at Florida Southern from 1952 to 1955.

=== Billy Atkins era (1966–1971) ===
On January 8, 1966, Billy Atkins was named the head coach of the Troy football team. In 1968, he coached Troy State to the NAIA National Championship and was named the NAIA Coach of the Year. Atkins finished at Troy State with a 44–16–2 record before leaving in 1971. He is the second-winningest coach in Troy history, only behind Larry Blakeney. Atkins was inducted into the Troy University Sports Hall of Fame in 2012.

=== Tom Jones era (1972–1973) ===
Tom Jones was hired as Troy State's head coach in 1972. He served as the head football coach from 1972 to 1973, compiling a record of 11–7–2. In addition to his head coaching duties Jones also served as the Troy University Athletic Director from 1972 to 1974.

=== Byrd Whigham era (1974–1975) ===
Byrd Whigham led the Troy Trojans football program for two seasons and his teams compiled a 12–8 record in his two seasons. Whigham departed after the 1975 season.

=== Charlie Bradshaw era (1976–1982) ===
Former Kentucky head coach Charlie Bradshaw came out of retirement in 1976 to accept the position of head coach for the Trojans, which had become the school's nickname just a short time earlier. Under Bradshaw's tutelage, the Trojans compiled a 41–27–2 record, which included three eight-win seasons and one conference championship. However, a 3–7 campaign in 1981 and a 2–8 season in 1982 ended Bradshaw's tenure at Troy State.

=== Chan Gailey era (1983–1984) ===
In 1983, Chan Gailey took over the head coaching duties at Troy State, where he led the Trojans to a 12–1 record in 1984 en route to the Division II championship. Gailey departed Troy State after two seasons to accept the position of tight ends coach and special teams coordinator with the NFL's Denver Broncos.

=== Rick Rhoades era (1985–1987) ===
Rick Rhoades, previously the Trojans' defensive coordinator, was the head coach at Troy State from 1985 to 1987. In 1987, he led the team to the NCAA Division II Football Championship. Rhoades left Troy State after three seasons.

=== Robert Maddox era (1988–1990) ===
At Troy State, head coach Robert Maddox inherited a team which the previous season had gone 12–1–1, winning the NCAA Division II Football Championship. Despite this, in 1988, Troy State had its first losing season since 1982, going 4–6. The following season, the team showed little improvement, finishing with an identical 4–6 record. In 1990, Troy State improved slightly to 5–5, and Maddox resigned following a season-ending 24–23 win over Nicholls State.

=== Larry Blakeney era (1991–2014) ===
Larry Blakeney became the twentieth head football coach at Troy State University on December 3, 1990. The program was officially still a Division II program, but were already approved to transition to NCAA Division I-AA the following season. He took over a program that won two national championships the previous decade, but were 13–17 the previous 3 years.

The first full year at Division I-AA, the Troy State Trojans made it to the semifinal game and finished 12–1–1, 10–0–1 in the regular season. This marked the first undefeated, regular, full season of Troy State Trojans football and they finished ranked first in the end of season poll by Sports Network. In 1995, the team improved on that record finishing 11–0 in the regular season for the first undefeated and untied season in history. During the eight seasons the team was a member of I-AA football, they made the playoffs seven seasons and won the Southland Conference championship three times and made the playoff semifinals twice.

Troy State transitioned to Division I-A in 2001. During that season they defeated three Division I-A schools, including their first win over a BCS conference school, Mississippi State. The transition makes Blakeney one of two coaches to ever take a football team from Division II to I-A (the other is UCF's Gene McDowell).

In 2004, Troy's first year in the Sun Belt Conference, Blakeney coached his team to one of the biggest victories in the school's and the Sun Belt's history after defeating then No. 17 ranked Missouri 24–14 at home, in front of a national audience on ESPN2. He once again coached his team to a victory over a BCS school in 2007 at home, routing Oklahoma State 41–23 on ESPN2

After losing the 2008 New Orleans Bowl in overtime against Southern Miss and losing the 2010 GMAC Bowl in double-overtime against Central Michigan, Blakeney would get his second bowl victory in the 2010 New Orleans Bowl, defeating Ohio 48–21.

ESPN recognized Blakeney as one of the top 5 non-AQ recruiting closers in 2009.

Troy University football began playing in the NCAA's Division I-A in 2001, became a football only member of the Sun Belt Conference in 2004, and joined that conference for all other sports in 2005. The Trojan football team made its first bowl game appearance in the Silicon Valley Football Classic on December 30, 2004, that same season, but lost to Northern Illinois, 34–21. In 2006, Troy won the Sun Belt Conference for the first time after defeating Middle Tennessee in dramatic fashion in the last game of the 2006 season in a game that is now referred to as "The Miracle in Murfreesboro". As the 2006 Sun Belt Conference champions, Troy played in the New Orleans Bowl on December 22, 2006, against Rice University, routing the Owls of Conference USA by a score of 41–17. The New Orleans Bowl victory was Troy's first bowl victory in history.

Under Blakeney's tutelage, many quarterbacks at Troy University broke school records and some national records. From 2010 to 2013, Corey Robinson broke the school record for career passing yards and is ranked No. 11 in the NCAA for all-time career passing yards with 13,477. One of his more memorable performances came the first game of his senior year when he rallied his team from a 31–17 deficit vs. UAB to a 34–31 OT win, in the process breaking Steve Sarkisian's record for highest completion percentage in a game with a minimum of 30 attempts. Robinson completed 30 of 32 attempts for a new record of 93.8%.

Upon Robinson's graduation, new freshman quarterback Brandon Silvers stepped in and set yet another national record in 2014. During Silvers' freshman campaign, he broke Sam Bradford's 2007 Oklahoma NCAA record for completion percentage by a freshman as he completed 70.5 percent of his passes (191-of-271); whereas Bradford had completed 69.5 percent of his attempts.

Blakeney officially retired at the end of the 2014 season. He led the program to three Southland Football League titles and five straight Sun Belt Conference titles, as well as guided the Trojans to seven FCS playoff appearances and four FBS bowl games. Blakeney finished with an overall record of 178–113–1 as head coach at Troy. Blakeney is the winningest coach in the Troy University history and he is the fifth winningest collegiate coach all-time in the state of Alabama, only behind greats Bear Bryant, Nick Saban, Cleve Abbott, and Ralph Jordan.

=== Neal Brown era (2015–2018) ===
Kentucky offensive coordinator Neal Brown, who had served in the same capacity at Troy from 2008 to 2009, was named the Trojans head coach in November 2014. In 2015, Brown's Trojans posted a 4–8 record. Troy was ranked for the first time in the AP top 25 on November 13, 2016, they became the first team from the Sun Belt Conference to be ranked in the Top 25 and finished the year with a record of 10–3. Troy capped off the 2016 season by defeating Ohio in the Dollar General Bowl in Mobile, Alabama.

In Brown's third season at the helm in 2017, he led Troy to a fast 3–1 start to begin the season. In the fifth game of the season on September 30, Troy faced No. 25-ranked LSU. After leading in the third quarter by a score of 24–7, the LSU Tigers began to mount a comeback in the fourth quarter by scoring 14 unanswered points and trailing just 24–21 with less than 30 seconds left in the game. LSU began to move the ball down-field before having only 8 seconds left on the clock. The very next play wound up being an interception for Troy, which sealed the upset victory. The win over LSU snapped the Tigers' 46-game non-conference home winning streak, which was the longest such streak in the country at the time. Ironically LSU's last non-conference home loss came to another Alabama school UAB 13–10 back in 2000. The Trojans would wind up winning the Sun Belt title after defeating Arkansas State in a thriller, 32–25. Afterward, Troy met North Texas in the New Orleans Bowl, with Troy defeating the Mean Green by a score of 50–30. Troy's 11–2 overall record is the programs best season finish since joining the FBS in 2001.

Following Troy's record season in 2017, Brown would lead Troy to yet another 10+ win season in 2018. The Trojans began the season with a home-opener against No. 22 Boise State, in front of a Veterans Memorial Stadium record crowd of 29,612. The Trojans came up short, losing 20–56 to the Broncos, but would go on a 5-game win streak following the loss. During the 5-game win streak, Troy repeated what they had done the season before, beating another power conference team as they ventured into Lincoln, Nebraska and defeating Nebraska by a score of 24–19. In Troy's sixth game of the season, starting quarterback Kaleb Barker suffered a knee injury that kept him out for the remainder of the season. Brown decided to make Sawyer Smith the new starting quarterback for Troy afterwards. Upon suffering an upset loss to Liberty, Brown led Troy on another 4-game win streak, which included a win over South Alabama to win the Battle for the Belt rivalry trophy. In the last game of the regular season, Troy would play Appalachian State at Kidd Brewer Stadium in what turned out to be the deciding game to see who would win the Sun Belt's East division. Appalachian State would come away with a 21–10 victory over Troy, effectively knocking Troy out of the Sun Belt championship hunt. Troy finished the regular season with a 9–3 overall record, 7–1 in conference play.

Upon receiving an invite to the 2018 Dollar General Bowl, the Trojans were pitted against Mid-American Conference East division champion Buffalo, who was 10–3 on the season and was considered the favorite to win the bowl game. Buffalo featured future NFL Draft Picks in QB Tyree Jackson, WR Anthony Johnson, and LB Khalil Hodge. Despite what the oddsmakers were predicting, Brown was able to lead Troy to victory over Buffalo, 42–32. The win secured Neal Brown's third consecutive 10+ win season, and set a new record in Troy football history as the first time Troy had ever had three successive seasons with ten or more wins. It also marked three straight bowl wins for Troy.

Following the season, West Virginia went on to hire Neal Brown as their new head coach.

=== Chip Lindsey era (2019–2021) ===
On January 10, 2019, it was announced that Chip Lindsey would become Troy's 22nd head coach. He was previously on staff at Kansas as offensive coordinator for less than two months before being hired by Troy to be its head coach. Lindsey came to Troy with additional experience as an offensive coordinator for Auburn, Arizona State, and Southern Miss. Coach Lindsey's time at Troy was seen overall as a disappointment as he was only able to win 5 games each of his three seasons in charge. On November 21, 2021, Troy fired Lindsey with one game remaining in the 2021 season. He posted a record of 15–19 over three years with no bowl appearances.

=== Jon Sumrall era (2022–2023) ===
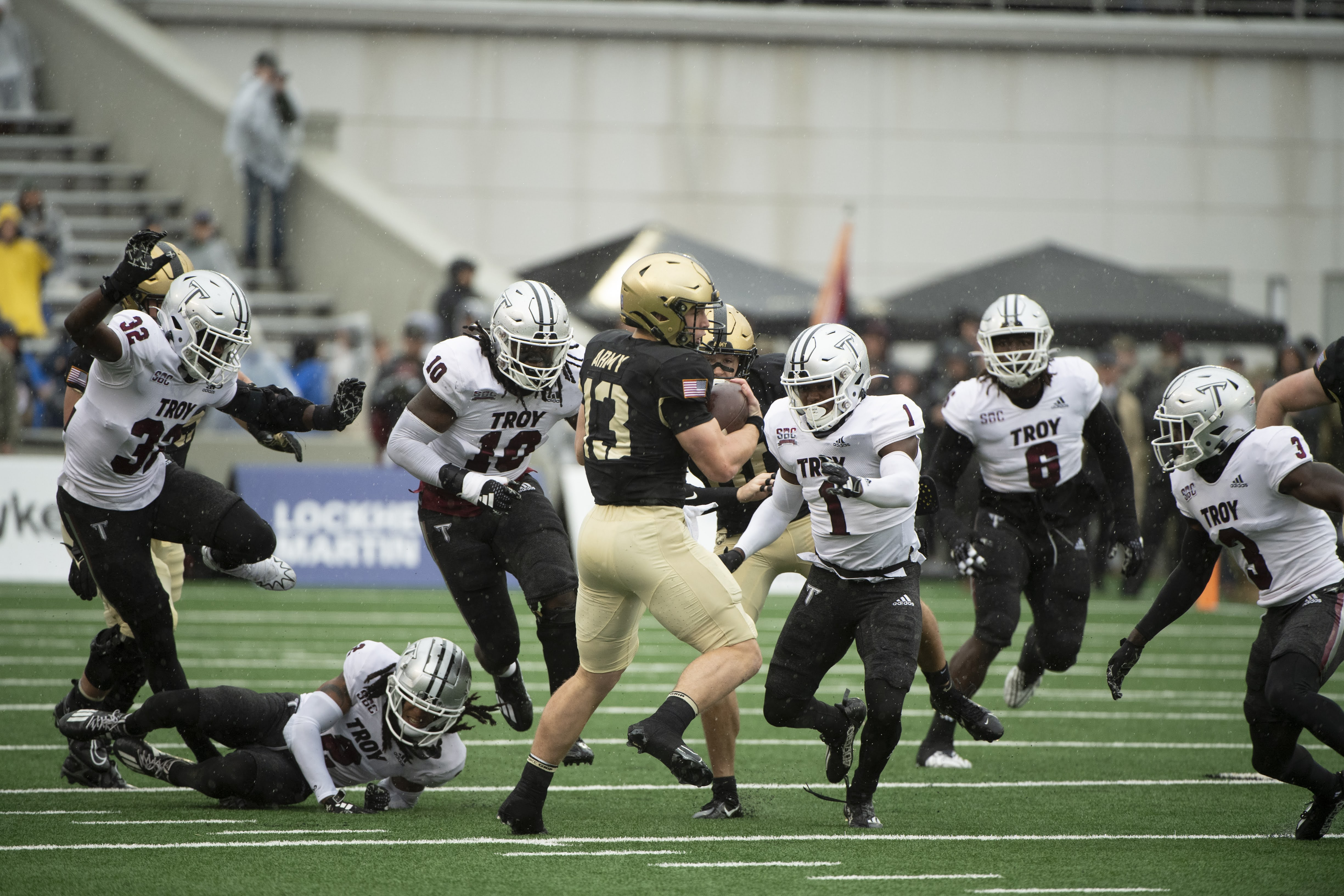
Trojans defenders rush opposing quarterback Bryson Daily during a 2023 win over Army

On December 2, 2021, it was announced that Jon Sumrall would become the 23rd head coach of the program. He previously served as co-defensive coordinator and linebackers coach at Kentucky.

There were modest expectations for Sumrall in 2022 as the Trojans were expected to finish third in the newly expanded Sun Belt Conference's West Division. However Sumrall was able to guide Troy to a record setting season. Troy finished 10–2 (7–1) in the regular season with their only losses being on the road at #21 Ole Miss 28–10 and 32–28 on the road against Appalachian State due to a Hail Mary touchdown. Inspired to avenge the loss Sumrall would lead Troy to 9 straight wins to conclude the regular season and clinch the 2022 Sun Belt West title. The Trojans went on to beat Coastal Carolina 45–26 on December 3, 2022, at Veterans Memorial Stadium in Troy, to win their seventh Sun Belt Conference Football championship. The following day Troy was ranked #24 in the nation by the College Football Playoff Committee. They accepted a bid to play against the #25 UTSA Roadrunners, Conference USA Champions, in the Cure Bowl on December 16, 2022. Troy would end the game victorious by the final score of 18–12. With this win Coach Jon Sumrall was the first coach in Troy history to win 12 games at the FBS level. Sumrall and the Trojans finished ranked #20 in ESPN's Power Poll and #19 in the AP Top 25.

Unlike in 2022 Troy was on everybody's radar coming into the 2023 season and were ranked first in the SBC Preseason Poll for the West Division. Sumrall and Troy had flash backs to 2022 though as they started the season 1–2 with a 42–13 loss in Manhattan, Kansas to #15 Kansas State and the following week when Troy came up short in a tight loss to James Madison 16–14 at home. This would be Sumrall's first and only loss at home during his time as Troy's head coach. However, just as in 2022, Sumrall would lead Troy to win 9 straight games to finish the regular season 10–2 (7–1) and back-to-back SBC West Division Champions. On December 2, 2023, at Veterans Memorial Stadium Sumrall and the Trojans would find revenge from the previous season's loss to Appalachian State with a 49–23 win in the Sun Belt Championship. Sumrall had now led Troy to back-to-back conference championships for the time since Larry Blakeney's historic 2006–2010 run.

Sumrall ended his tenure at Troy when he accepted the same role at Tulane. Sumrall finished as Troy's head coach with a 23–4 overall record, 16–2 in Sun Belt Conference play, 12–0 against the Sun Belt Western Division, and 13–1 at home in Troy.

=== Gerad Parker era (2024-present) ===
On December 18, 2023, it was announced that Gerad Parker would become the 24th head coach of the Troy Trojans. His previous stop was as offensive coordinator and tight ends coach at Notre Dame. He has had other coaching stops at power five conference programs Penn State, West Virginia, Duke, and Purdue.

Troy finished 4-8 (3-5) in Gerad Parker's first season as head coach with wins against Florida A&M, Coastal Carolina, Georgia Southern, and Southern Miss. Troy struggled with inexperience and injuries throughout the season but won 3 of their last 4 games to close out the season.

Troy finished 8-6 (6-2) in Gerad Parker's second season as head coach with wins against Nicholls, Buffalo, South Alabama (in Overtime), Texas State, Louisiana-Monroe, Louisiana, Georgia State, and Southern Miss. For the first time since 2023, they also made the Sun Belt Championship., but they lost against James Madison (who would later make the CFP Playoffs), and they accepted a bowl game against Jacksonville State, which they would later lose.

== Conference membership history ==
- Independent (1909–1937, 1991–1995, 2001–2003)
- Alabama Intercollegiate Conference (1938–1959)
- Alabama Collegiate Conference (1960–1969)
- Gulf South Conference (1970–1990)
- Southland Conference (1996–2000)
- Sun Belt Conference (2004–present)

== Championships ==
=== National championships ===
The program won the 1968 NAIA National Championship against Texas A&I (now Texas A&M-Kingsville). Troy beat North Dakota State in 1984 to win their first Division II national title. They won their second Division II national title in 1987 after defeating Portland State.

Season	Division	Coach	Record	Opponent	Result
1968	NAIA	Billy Atkins	11–1	Texas A&I	W 43–35
1984	NCAA Division II	Chan Gailey	12–1	North Dakota State	W 18–17
1987	NCAA Division II	Rick Rhoades	12–1	Portland State	W 31–17

=== Conference championships ===
Troy has won 23 conference championships, 17 outright and six shared.

Season	Conference	Coach	Overall Record	Conference Record
1939	Alabama Intercollegiate Conference	Albert Choate	7–4	4–0
1941	Alabama Intercollegiate Conference	Albert Choate	5–4	3–0
1942	Alabama Intercollegiate Conference	Albert Choate	4–3	2–0
1967	Alabama Collegiate Conference	Billy Atkins	8–2	3–0
1968	Alabama Collegiate Conference	Billy Atkins	11–1	3–0
1969	Alabama Collegiate Conference	Billy Atkins	8–1–1	3–0
1971†	Gulf South Conference	Billy Atkins	6–3	5–1
1973	Gulf South Conference	Tom Jones	7–2–1	6–2
1976	Gulf South Conference	Charlie Bradshaw	8–1–1	7–1
1984	Gulf South Conference	Chan Gailey	12–1	7–1
1986	Gulf South Conference	Rick Rhoades	10–2	8–0
1987	Gulf South Conference	Rick Rhoades	12–1–1	8–0
1996	Southland Conference	Larry Blakeney	12–2	5–1
1999†	Southland Conference	Larry Blakeney	11–2	6–1
2000	Southland Conference	Larry Blakeney	10–2	7–0
2006†	Sun Belt Conference	Larry Blakeney	8–5	6–1
2007†	Sun Belt Conference	Larry Blakeney	8–4	6–1
2008	Sun Belt Conference	Larry Blakeney	8–5	6–1
2009	Sun Belt Conference	Larry Blakeney	9–4	8–0
2010†	Sun Belt Conference	Larry Blakeney	8–5	6–2
2017†	Sun Belt Conference	Neal Brown	11–2	7–1
2022	Sun Belt Conference	Jon Sumrall	12–2	7–1
2023	Sun Belt Conference	Jon Sumrall	11–2	7–1

† Co-champions

=== Division championships ===
The Sun Belt Conference began divisional play in 2018, with Troy being in the Sun Belt's East Division. Troy has won 2 divisional championship.

Year	Division	Coach	Overall Record	Conference Record	Opponent	CG Result
2018†	Sun Belt East	Neal Brown	10–3	7–1	N/A lost tiebreaker to Appalachian State	
2022	Sun Belt West	Jon Sumrall	12–2	7–1	Coastal Carolina	W 45–26
2023	Sun Belt West	Jon Sumrall	11–2	7–1	Appalachian State	W 49–23
2025	Sun Belt West	Gerad Parker	8–4	6–2	James Madison	L 14–31

† Co-champions

== Postseason results ==
=== Bowl games ===
Season	Coach	Bowl	Opponent	Result
1948	Fred McCollum	Paper Bowl†	Jacksonville State	L 0–19
1968	Billy Atkins	Champion Bowl†	Texas A&I	W 45–35
1984	Chan Gailey	Palm Bowl†	North Dakota State	W 18–17
2004	Larry Blakeney	Silicon Valley Football Classic	Northern Illinois	L 21–34
2006	Larry Blakeney	New Orleans Bowl	Rice	W 41–17
2008	Larry Blakeney	New Orleans Bowl	Southern Miss	L 27–30
2009	Larry Blakeney	GMAC Bowl	No. 25 Central Michigan	L 41–44
2010	Larry Blakeney	New Orleans Bowl	Ohio	W 48–21
2016	Neal Brown	Dollar General Bowl	Ohio	W 28–23
2017	Neal Brown	New Orleans Bowl	North Texas	W 50–30
2018	Neal Brown	Dollar General Bowl	Buffalo	W 42–32
2022	Jon Sumrall	Cure Bowl	No. 22 UTSA	W 18–12
2023	Greg Gasparato*	Birmingham Bowl	Duke	L 10–17
2025	Gerad Parker	Salute to Veterans Bowl	Jacksonville State	L 13–17

*Greg Gasparato as interim head coach

†non-Division I bowl game

=== NCAA Division I-AA/FCS playoffs ===
The Trojans made seven appearances in the NCAA Division I-AA/FCS playoffs from 1993 to 2000. Their combined record was 4–7.

Year	Round	Opponent	Result
1993	First Round; Quarterfinals; Semifinals	Stephen F. Austin; McNeese State; Marshall	W 42–20; W 35–28; L 21–24
1994	First Round	James Madison	L 26–45
1995	First Round	Georgia Southern	L 21–24
1996	Quarterfinals; Semifinals	Murray State; Montana	W 31–3; L 7–70
1998	First Round	Florida A&M	L 17–27
1999	First Round; Quarterfinals	James Madison; Florida A&M	W 27–7; L 10–17
2000	First Round	Appalachian State	L 30–33

=== NCAA Division II playoffs ===
The Trojans have made three appearances in the NCAA Division II playoffs and won the NCAA Division II national championship twice. Their combined record was 7–1.

Year	Round	Opponent	Result
1984	First Round; Semifinals; Championship (Palm Bowl)	Central State; Towson State; North Dakota State	W 31–21; W 45–3; W 18–17
1986	First Round; Semifinals	Virginia Union; South Dakota	W 31–7; L 28–42
1987	First Round; Semifinals; Championship	Winston-Salem State; UCF; Portland State	W 45–14; W 31–10; W 31–17

=== NAIA playoffs ===
The Trojans made one appearances in the NAIA playoffs and won the NAIA national championship. Their combined record was 2–0.

Year	Round	Opponent	Result
1968	Semifinals; Championship (Champion Bowl)	Willamette; Texas A&I	W 63–10; W 45–35

== Head coaches ==
Head coach list from the 2018 Media Guide.

Coach	Years	Tenure	Record	Pct.
Virgil McKinley	1909	1	1–0–2	.667
Dan Herren	1910	1	1–1–2	.500
George Penton	1911-1912	2	7–1–1	.833
J. W. Campbell	1921-1923	3	12–13–1	.481
Ross V. Ford	1924	1	2–1–4	.571
Otis Bynum	1925-1926	2	12–4–1	.735
Gladwin Gaumer	1927-1928	2	7–7	.500
No coach	1930		1–2	.333
Albert Elmore	1931-1937	7	33–25–4	.565
Albert Choate	1938-1942	5	25–26–1	.490
No coach	1943-1945		3–4	.429
Fred McCollum	1947-1950	4	21–17–3	.549
Jim Grantham	1951-1954	4	11–23–1	.329
William Clipson	1955-1965	11	26–68	.277
Billy Atkins	1966-1971	6	44–16–2	.726
Tom Jones	1972-1973	2	11–7–2	.600
Byrd Whigham	1974-1975	2	12–8	.600
Charlie Bradshaw	1976-1982	7	40–27–2	.594
Chan Gailey	1983-1984	2	19–5	.792
Rick Rhoades	1985-1987	3	28–7–1	.792
Robert Maddox	1988-1990	3	13–17	.433
Larry Blakeney	1990-2014	25	178–113–1	.611
Neal Brown	2015-2018	4	35–16	.686
Chip Lindsey	2019-2021	3	15–19	.441
Jon Sumrall	2022–2023	2	23–4	.852
Gerad Parker	2024–present	3	16–20	.444

== Rivalries ==
=== South Alabama ===
Troy has an annual intra-conference rivalry with in-state foe South Alabama, known as the Battle for the Belt. The two schools first met on the gridiron in 2012, and have played every year since. Beginning in 2022, Troy will compete in the Sun Belt's West Division along with South Alabama. The rivalry is in Troy's favor 8–3.

=== UAB ===
Troy and UAB have met a total of 12 times. Both teams met fairly consistently until the shuttering of UAB's football program in 2014. UAB has since resurrected their football program. The teams are scheduled to renew their rivalry in 2028. Troy holds the series lead, 7–5.

=== Middle Tennessee ===
Troy's rivalry with Middle Tennessee, now dormant following Middle Tennessee's 2013 move to Conference USA, is known as the Battle for the Palladium. Troy and Middle Tennessee first played each other in 1936, but it wasn't until 2003 that the schools started playing annually for the Palladium Trophy. Troy and MTSU renewed the rivalry for one season in 2020 when they played an in-season home and home series due to COVID-19.

=== Jacksonville State ===
When Troy was a member of Division I-AA in football, they played Jacksonville State almost annually in the Battle for the Ol' School Bell rivalry. The idea for a school bell trophy stemmed from the two schools' common origins as teachers' colleges from the late 1800s to the 1930s. The last meeting between Troy and Jacksonville State was in 2001, with Troy (then known as Troy State) winning 21–3.

== Facilities ==
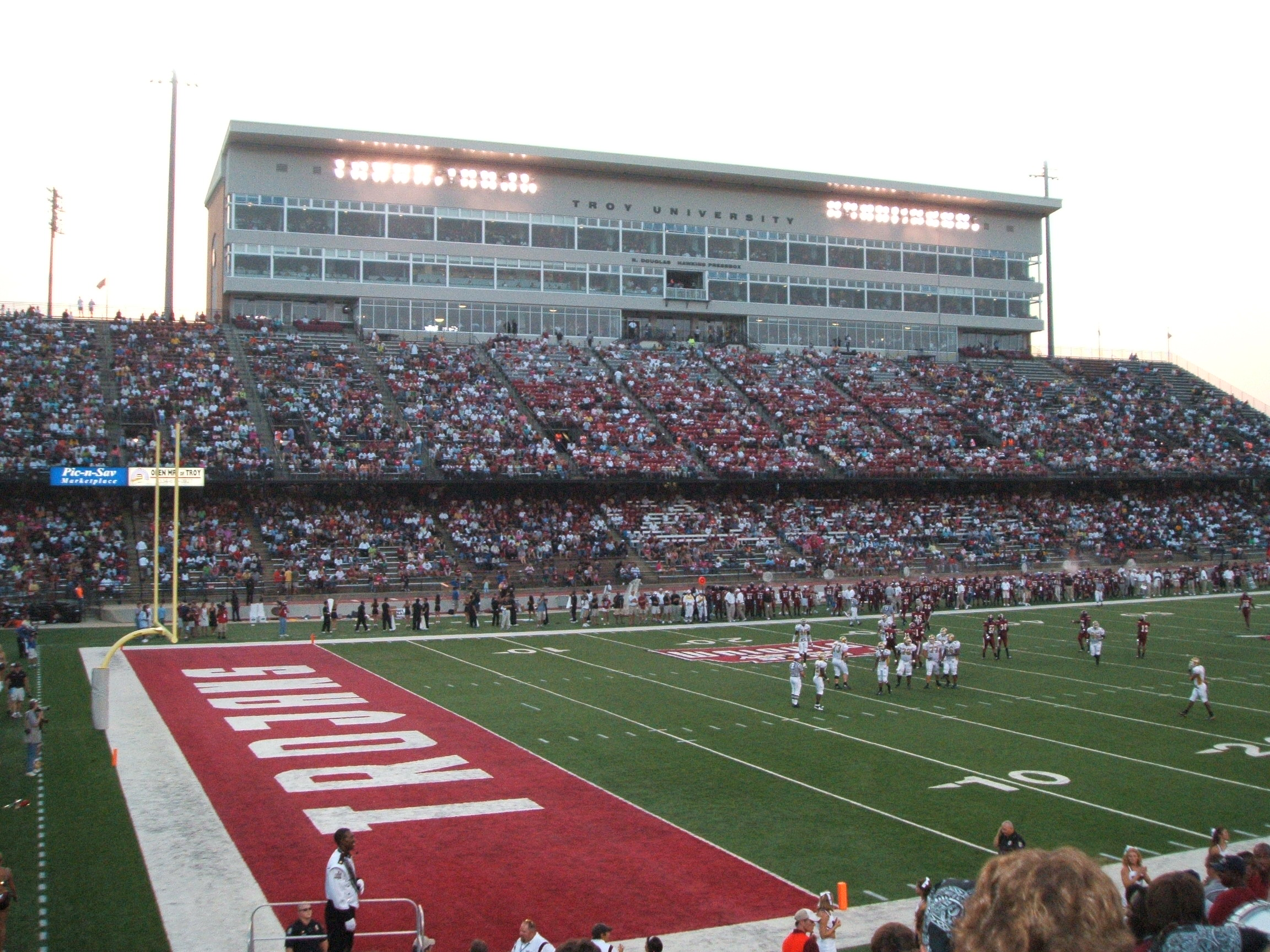
Veterans Memorial Stadium – "The Vet"

Larry Blakeney Field at Veterans Memorial Stadium is nicknamed "The Vet" and has a seating capacity of 30,000. The stadium was originally dedicated to the Troy State Teachers College students and Pike County residents who had died in World War II. The stadium solely consisted of a small, 5,000-seat grandstand on the west side of a running track, and was built into the natural slope of the ground. It was expanded several times, including the addition of upper deck in 1998 that brought capacity up to 17,500, until receiving a large addition of seating in 2003 which expanded the capacity of the stadium to 30,000. After the addition of the north endzone facility in 2018, the capacity once again expanded to 30,402.

The north endzone facility at the stadium is the largest featured end zone facility in the Sun Belt Conference and features a 3,150 sq.ft. Daktronics 15HD video board, which is also the largest in the conference, and the sixth largest among Group of Five schools.

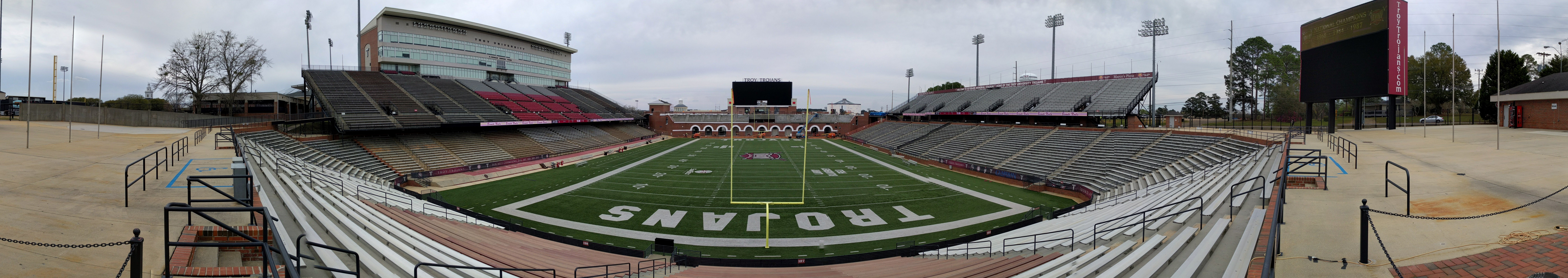
2018 Panorama of Veterans Memorial Stadium at Larry Blakeney Field

== Traditions ==
=== Trojan Walk ===
Before each Troy home football game, hundreds of Troy fans and students line University Avenue on campus to cheer on the team as they march with the Sound of the South band and cheerleaders from the Quad to Tailgate Terrace, surrounded by fans who pat them on the back and shake their hands as they walk toward Veterans Memorial Stadium.

=== Band Show on University ===
Before each home game, the Sound of the South marching band performs a pre-game show on University Avenue in between all of the tailgating areas before the Trojan Walk begins.

=== Trojan Fanfare ===
During the pre-game show at Veterans Memorial Stadium, the Sound of the South will perform what is known as the "Trojan Fanfare." The band will line up around the concourse of the stadium, from the east side, to the south side, to the west side, and begin to play the "Trojan Fanfare". They later run down the steps around the stadium toward the field, and get into formation on the field to begin pregame. It is a favorite among most fans and energizes the fanbase leading up to kickoff.

=== "Havoc!" ===
One of the more popular traditions of gameday, during the pre-game show the band marches onto the field to prepare for the football team to run out of the gates. The band falls silent, and the announcer then recites the phrase from William Shakespeare's Julius Caesar. Fans in the stadium will yell out "Havoc!" in unison along with the announcer before the last line of the phrase:

And so, with mighty warriors clad in strongest armor
and well prepared to receive the lot dealt by fate
the contest is at hand.
And the commander's spirit, ranging for revenge
shall in a monarch's voice cry, 'Havoc!'
and let slip the dogs of war.

The phrase "Havoc!" is also used as a motto or battle cry among Trojan fans.

=== Post-game Celebration & Band Show ===
After Troy wins a home game, the players will go to the corner of the stadium where the Sound of the South marching band is and will sing the fight song, alma mater, and sometimes do chants with them.

There is also a post-game band show after every home football game, where the Sound of the South marching band sets up to perform on the football field in the south endzone, and performs a final show for all remaining fans still in attendance.

=== Trojan Warrior ===
Before every game and after every touchdown, the Trojan Warrior or Trojan Princess would blaze down the football field on a horse named "Big Red." This tradition is no longer used because the football field turf was changed from grass to artificial grass.

== Top 25 finishes ==
=== FBS ===
Year	Record	AP Poll	USA Today Coaches' Poll	CFP Poll
2022	12–2	#19	#20	#24

=== FCS ===
Year	Record	Sports Network Poll	USA Today/ESPN Poll
1993	12–1–1	#1	
1994	8–4	#12	
1995	11–1	#3	
1996	12–2	#4	#12
1998	8–4	#11	#13
1999	11–2	#6	#6
2000	10–2	#9	#3

=== Small college and NCAA Division II ===
Year	Record	Committee Poll	AP Poll	UPI Coaches' Poll
1968	11–1		#11	#7
1969	8–1–1			#11
1976	8–1–1		#6	
1984	12–1	#3		
1986	10–2	#3		
1987	12–1–1	#4		

== Award winners ==
- AFCA Coach of the Year Award

Chan Gailey – 1984
Rick Rhoades – 1987

- Buck Buchanan Award

Al Lucas – 1999

== All-Americans (FBS) ==
- 2002 — Osi Umenyiora — AP Honorable Mention
- 2002 — Thomas Olmsted — Sporting News Freshman
- 2007 — Leodis McKelvin — First-Team — Rivals, Sporting News, Pro Weekly
- 2009 — Bryan Willis — Sporting News Freshman
- 2013 — Jordan Chunn — CFN Freshman Honorable Mention
- 2017 — Marcus Jones — FWAA Freshman, CFN Honorable Mention, ESPN Freshman, Phil Steele Third-Team
- 2018 — Carlton Martial — USA Today Freshman, The Athletic Freshman, FWAA Freshman
- 2019 — Carlton Martial — Pro Football Focus Second-Team
- 2019 — Dell Pettus — Pro Football Focus Freshman
- 2021 — Cameron Kaye — Special Teams U Third-Team
- 2021 — Carlton Martial — Pro Football Network Honorable Mention
- 2021 — Javon Solomon — Pro Football Network Honorable Mention
- 2022 — Carlton Martial — Pro Football Network First-Team
- 2023 — Javon Solomon — The Action Network Second-Team
- 2023 — Kimani Vidal — AP Third-Team

== NFL players ==
Trojans in the NFL
NFL Draft selections
Total selected:	37
1st Round:	2
2nd Round:	2
3rd Round:	3

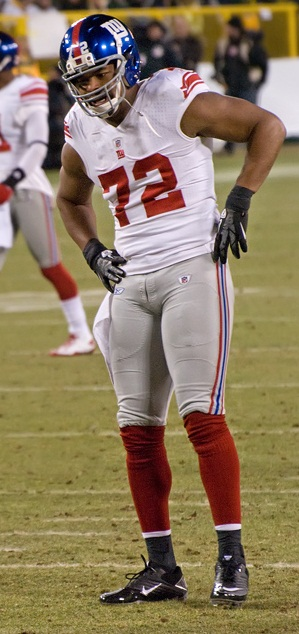
Osi Umenyiora

=== Current players ===
- Marcus Jones
- Jake Andrews
- Javon Solomon
- Kimani Vidal
- Dell Pettus
- Reddy Steward
- Caleb Ransaw
- Tez Johnson
- Matthew Caldwell

=== Former players ===
- Mario Addison
- Jorrick Calvin
- Cameron Sheffield
- Brynden Trawick
- Elbert Mack
- Brandon Burks
- Antonio Garcia
- Leodis McKelvin
- James Brown
- Leonard Wheeler
- Jordan Chunn
- Damion Willis
- Jonathan Massaquoi
- Trevor Ford
- DuJuan Harris
- Sherrod Martin
- Steve McLendon
- Gary Banks
- DeMarcus Ware
- Osi Umenyiora
- Lawrence Tynes
- Bubba Marriott
- Matt Allen
- Kerry Jenkins
- Al Lucas
- Jerrel Jernigan
- Jimmy McClain
- Rayshun Reed
- Shawn Stuckey
- Dion Gales
- Rod Walker
- Pratt Lyons
- Michael Moore
- Jonathan Carter
- Perry Griggs
- Titus Dixon
- Clifford Ivory
- Mareno Philyaw
- Jack Smith
- Davern Williams
- Willie Tullis
- Virgil Seay
- Brannon Condren
- Levi Brown
- Jack Smith
- Anthony Henton
- Derrick Moore
- Jonathan Carter
- Chris Bradwell
- Kanorris Davis
- Boris Lee
- Bear Woods
- Alfred Malone
- Marcus Spriggs
- Corey Robinson
- Chandler Worthy

=== Pro Football Hall of Fame inductees ===
- DeMarcus Ware, DE, Class of 2023

== Future non-conference opponents ==
Announced schedules as of August 25, 2026.

2026	2027	2028	2029	2030	2031	2032	2033	2034	2035	2039
Sam Houston	at Nevada	at Clemson	at NC State	at Central Michigan	at Auburn	UAB	at UAB	at Middle Tennessee	BYU	at Army
Alabama State	Southeastern Louisiana	West Georgia	UAB	at Mississippi State			Middle Tennessee	Army		
at Missouri	at Miami (FL)	Central Michigan	Austin Peay							
at Utah State	Buffalo	at UAB	at Sam Houston							
