= Tom Jones (coach) =

Biographical details
- Born: December 6, 1923
- Died: July 15, 2014 (aged 90); Lowndesboro, Alabama, U.S.

Playing career

Football
- 1947: Troy State

Coaching career (HC unless noted)

Football
- 1949–1954: Hayneville HS (AL)
- 1955–1965: Robert E. Lee HS (AL)
- 1966–1971: Auburn (freshmen)
- 1972–1973: Troy State

Administrative career (AD unless noted)
- 1972–1974: Troy State

Head coaching record
- Overall: 11–7–2 (college)

Accomplishments and honors

Championships
- 1 GSC (1973)

Awards
- Gulf South Coach of The Year (1973)

John Tom Jones (December 6, 1923 – July 14, 2014) was an American football player, coach, and college athletics administrator. He served as the head football coach at Troy State University—now known as Troy University—from 1972 to 1973, compiling a record of 11–7–2. He was also the athletic director at Troy State from 1972 to 1974. Jones was hired at Troy State after coaching the freshman football team at Auburn University for six seasons.

Jones was a native of Tallassee, Alabama. He played high school football for coach J. E. "Hot" O'Brien and was part of the Tallassee Tigers' legendary 57-game unbeaten streak (56 wins, 1 tie).

He died at his home in Lowndesboro, Alabama on July 14, 2014, at the age of 90.

== Head coaching record ==
=== College ===
Year	Team	Overall	Conference	Standing	Bowl/playoffs
Troy State Trojans (Gulf South Conference) (1972–1973)
1972	Troy State	4–5–1	2–3–1	5th	
1973	Troy State	7–2–1	6–1	1st	
Troy State:		11–7–2	8–4–1		
Total:		11–7–2			
National championship Conference title Conference division title or championship game berth
