= Albert Elmore =

Biographical details
- Born: November 19, 1904; Reform, Alabama, U.S.
- Died: July 26, 1998 (aged 93); Troy, Alabama, U.S.

Playing career

Football
- 1929–1930: Alabama
- Position: End

Coaching career (HC unless noted)

Football
- 1931–1936: Troy State
- 1937: VMI (assistant)

Basketball
- 1937–1938: VMI

Administrative career (AD unless noted)
- 1931–1937: Troy State

Head coaching record
- Overall: 31–20–2 (football); 4–11 (basketball)

Accomplishments and honors

Championships
- National (1930)

Albert Bascom Elmore (November 19, 1904 – July 26, 1988) was an American college football coach and player, college basketball coach, and college athletics administrator. A graduate of the University of Alabama, Elmore led Troy State Teachers College (now known as Troy University) from 1931 to 1936, compiling a 31–20–2 record. He also coached basketball at Virginia Military Institute for one season in the late 1930s.

== Coaching career ==
Following his graduation from University of Alabama, Elmore began coaching in 1931 at Troy State Teachers College. He is credited with changing the team nickname to "Red Wave" (this was a variation of Alabama's "Crimson Tide", and the current nickname is "Trojans"). In seven years at Troy State, five of which were winning seasons, Elmore compiled a 35–30–3 record.

Elmore then left for Virginia Military Institute (VMI) in Lexington, Virginia, where he headed the school's freshman football team as well as the basketball team in the 1937–38 season. The Keydets were 4–11 in Elmore's lone season at the institute.

== Personal life ==
Elmore was born on November 19, 1904, in Reform, Alabama, to Silvanus and Ann Elmore. He grew up with eight brothers and two sisters. Elmore died on July 26, 1998, in Troy.

== Head coaching record ==
=== Football ===
Year	Team	Overall	Conference	Standing	Bowl/playoffs
Troy State Red Wave (Independent) (1931–1937)
1931	Troy State	6–4			
1932	Troy State	5–3–2			
1933	Troy State	5–1			
1934	Troy State	7–2			
1935	Troy State	5–5			
1936	Troy State	3–5			
Troy State:		31–20–2			
Total:		31–20–2			

=== Basketball ===
Record table
Season	Team	Overall	Conference	Standing	Postseason
VMI Keydets (Southern Conference) (1937–1938)
1937–38	VMI	4–11	2–7	13th	
VMI:		4–11	2–7		
Total:		4–11			
