= George Penton =

American football player and coach (1882–1969)

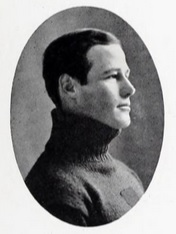
- Penton at Troy, c. 1911

Biographical details
- Born: September 6, 1882; Rockford, Alabama, U.S.
- Died: July 11, 1969 (aged 86); Montgomery, Alabama, U.S.

Playing career
- 1907–1909: Auburn
- Positions: Guard, fullback

Coaching career (HC unless noted)
- 1910: Jacksonville State
- 1911–1912: Troy State
- 1913: Auburn (assistant)
- 1919–1921: Sidney Lanier HS (AL)

Administrative career (AD unless noted)
- 1911–1912: Troy State

Head coaching record
- Overall: 8–4–3 (college)

George Washington "Doc" Penton (September 6, 1882 – July 11, 1969) was an American football player and coach. He served as the head football coach at Jacksonville State Normal School (now Jacksonville State University) in 1910 and at Troy State Normal School (now Troy University) from 1911 to 1912, compiling a career college football coaching record of 8–4–3. Penton played college football at Auburn University as a guard and fullback from 1907 to 1909. He was the brother of fellow football player and coach, John Penton.

== Playing career ==
Penton played football, baseball, basketball, and track at Auburn University. He was a guard and fullback for Mike Donahue's Auburn Tigers football team from 1907 to 1909.

=== 1909 ===
Dick Jemison selected him second-team All-Southern at fullback.

== Coaching career ==
=== 1912 ===
Penton was athletic director at Troy University and led the Troy Trojans to its only perfect season in 1912, a 3–0 record.

=== 1913 ===
Penton was then an assistant under Donahue in 1913. His first year there the team won the Southern Intercollegiate Athletic Association championship.

=== 1919–1921 ===
Penton coached the Sidney Lanier High School Poets from 1919 to 1921.

== Head coaching record ==
=== College ===
Year	Team	Overall	Conference	Standing	Bowl/playoffs
Jacksonville State Eagle Owls (Independent) (1910)
1910	Jacksonville State	1–3–2			
Jacksonville State:		1–3–2			
Troy State Teachers (Independent) (1911–1912)
1911	Troy State	4–1–1			
1912	Troy State	3–0			
Troy State:		7–1–1			
Total:		8–4–3			
