= Dan Herren =

American football player and coach (1888–1956)

Biographical details
- Born: August 6, 1888; Elmore County, Alabama, U.S.
- Died: August 15, 1956 (aged 68); East Tallassee, Alabama, U.S.

Playing career
- 1908–1909: Auburn
- Position: Halfback

Coaching career (HC unless noted)
- 1910: Troy State Normal

Head coaching record
- Overall: 1–1–2

Daniel Herren Sr. (August 6, 1888 – August 15, 1956) was an American college football player and coach. He served as the head football coach at Troy State Normal School—now known as Troy University—in 1910, compiling a record of 1–1–2. Herren played college football at Auburn University, where he was also a civil engineering assistant faculty member from 1909 to 1910.

== Head coaching record ==
Year	Team	Overall	Conference	Standing	Bowl/playoffs
Troy State Teachers (Independent) (1910)
1910	Troy State	1–1–2			
Troy State:		1–1–2			
Total:		1–1–2			
