= Virgil McKinley =

American football coach

Biographical details
- Born: October 2, 1874
- Died: July 3, 1954 (aged 79)
- Education: Alabama; Columbia (1909)

Coaching career (HC unless noted)
- 1909: Troy Normal

Head coaching record
- Overall: 1–0–2

Virgil Parks McKinley (October 2, 1874 – July 3, 1954) was an American college football coach and university faculty member. He began the college football program at Troy State University–then known as Troy Normal School–serving as the school's first head football coach in 1909, compiling a record of 1–0–2.

McKinley was a graduate of the University of Alabama and, later, Columbia University. After his time at Columbia, he returned to Alabama to become in industrial engineering faculty member.

== Head coaching record ==
Year	Team	Overall	Conference	Standing	Bowl/playoffs
Troy State Teachers (Independent) (1909)
1909	Troy State	1–0–2			
Troy State:		1–0–2			
Total:		1–0–2			
