= Ross V. Ford =

American football player and coach (1900–1955)

Biographical details
- Born: March 25, 1900
- Died: March 15, 1955 (aged 54); Birmingham, Alabama, U.S.

Playing career
- 1921–1923: Auburn
- Positions: Tackle, fullback

Coaching career (HC unless noted)
- 1924: Troy State

Head coaching record
- Overall: 2–1–4

Ross V. "Flivver" Ford (March 25, 1900 – March 15, 1955) was an American college football player and coach and educator. He served as the head football coach at Troy University–then known as Troy State College–in 1924, compiling a record of 2–1–4. Ford played football at Auburn University from 1921 to 1923.

Ross was the superintendent of education in Marion County, Alabama from 1935 to 1940. During World War II, he served as a Seabee in the United States Navy. Ross retired to Gurley, Alabama. He died on March 15, 1955, at Veterans Hospital in Birmingham, Alabama, after several months of illness.

== Head coaching record ==
Year	Team	Overall	Conference	Standing	Bowl/playoffs
Troy State Trojans (Independent) (1924)
1924	Troy State	2–1–4			
Troy State:		2–1–4			
Total:		2–1–4			
