= Paul V. Yoder =

American composer (1908–1990)

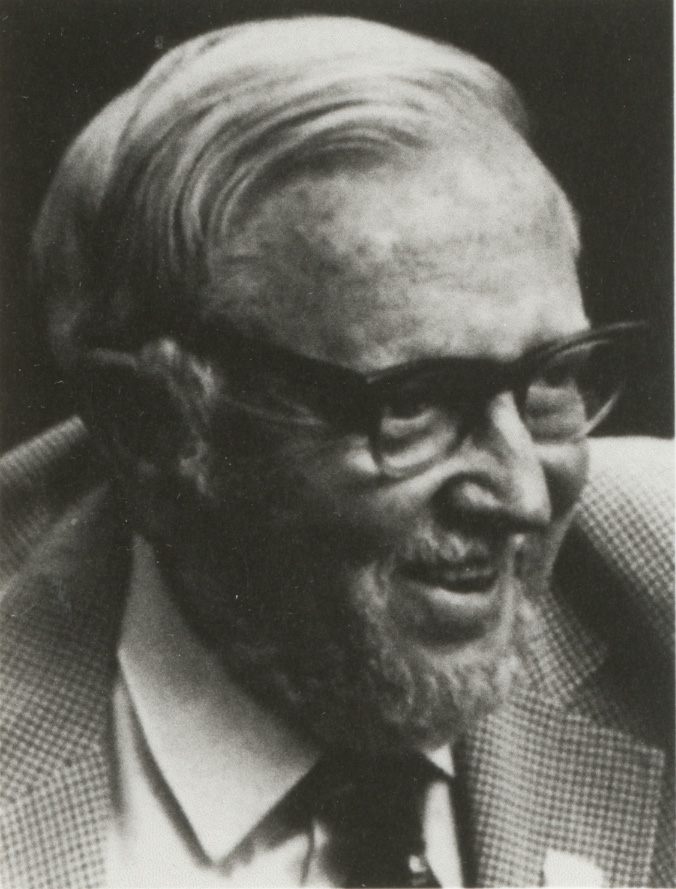
Yoder as the American Bandmasters Association's president in 1963

Paul Van Buskirk Yoder (October 8, 1908 – April 4, 1990) was an American musician, composer, arranger, and band director.

== Life ==
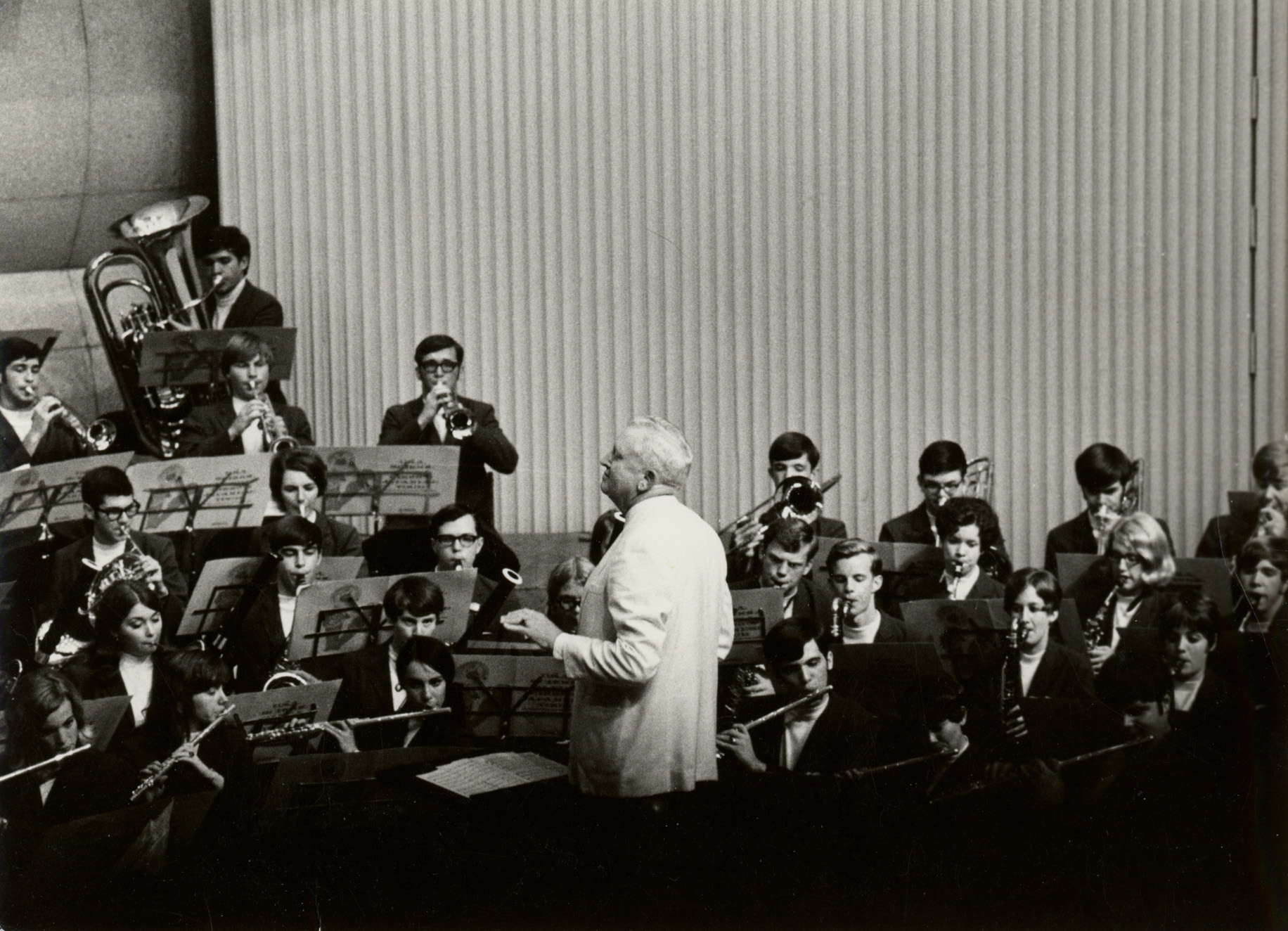
Yoder conducts in 1969

Yoder was born on October 8, 1908, in Tacoma, Washington. He obtained an undergraduate degree from the University of North Dakota, which later conferred an honorary Doctorate upon him and, in 1941, a master's degree from Northwestern University in Illinois. He co-founded the Japanese Band Director's Association, served as president of the American Bandmasters Association, and served on the board of directors of the Midwest International Band and Orchestra Clinic. Following years of vascular ailments, Yoder died April 4, 1990, in Hendersonville, North Carolina.

== Involvement with Japan ==
While investigating where in Japan his music was being played, and generating royalty checks, Yoder met many band directors interested in and performing Western music. Thus began an involvement with music education and concert bands in Japan that would include coordinating performance at the MidWest Clinic by many Japanese bands and being dubbed by contemporary Alfred Reed "an unofficial ambassador of band music between the US and Japan". Today, Yoder's arrangement of "Anchors Aweigh" is often used by bands of the Japan Self-Defense Forces, as well as those of other national militaries.

== Composer and arranger ==
A U.S. Marine Corps band performing Yoder's arrangement of "You're a Grand Old Flag" in 2012.

Yoder's first band composition, "Our Family Band", was published in 1933. He wrote over 1,500 original compositions and arrangements during the course of his career. He composed and arranged with a focus on works for young bands and also produced several instrumental methods. Biographer Steven Kelly stated "his emphasis on ensemble class instruction changed the manner in which bands were taught" and also that a band student between the 1930s and 1970s in the U.S. would be unlikely to be able to go without experiencing a Yoder piece. Yoder published primarily through Neil Kjos publishing, but also nearly 100 other firms worldwide.

Yoder was also the author of charts for over 30 marching band shows.

Yoder also composed Tennessee Tech’s fight song in 1946 and Texas State's Fight song "Go Bobcats!" in 1961.

Yoder's arrangement of "You're a Grand Old Flag" is commonly used today by the U.S. military in its performances of the song.

== Awards and recognition ==
Though recognized for his "warm, humorous personality" and "humble lifestyle", Yoder was an honorary life member of the National Band Association and was awarded, amongst other awards, the Academy of Wind and Percussion Arts, the Distinguished Service to Music Medal, and was inducted into the prestigious National Band Association Hall of Fame of Distinguished Band Conductors. The program notes for the 1969 awarding of the AWAPA award by the National Band Association listed Yoder as "one of the most influential band personalities of the mid 20th century, he was at one time the most popular composer/arranger of band music in America"
